= Deputy governor of Ekiti State =

Second highest-ranking official in the executive branch of Ekiti State in Nigeria

Deputy Governor of Ekiti State
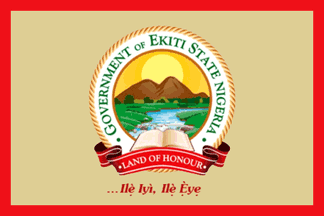
- Flag of Ekiti State
- Incumbent; Monisade Afuye since 16 October 2022
- Executive Branch of the Ekiti State Government
- Style: Deputy Governor (informal); Her Excellency (courtesy)
- Status: Second highest executive branch officer
- Member of: Ekiti State Executive Branch; Ekiti State Cabinet
- Seat: Ado-Ekiti
- Nominator: Gubernatorial candidate
- Appointer: Direct popular election or, if vacant, Governor via House of Assembly confirmation
- Term length: Four years renewable once
- Constituting instrument: Constitution of Nigeria
- Inaugural holder: Paul Alabi (Fourth Republic)
- Succession: First
- Website: ekitistate.gov.ng

The deputy governor of Ekiti State is the second-highest officer in the executive branch of the government of Ekiti State, Nigeria, after the governor of Ekiti State, and ranks first in line of succession. The deputy governor is directly elected together with the governor to a four-year term of office.

Monisade Afuye is the current deputy governor, having assumed office on 16 October 2022.

== Responsibilities ==
The deputy governor assists the governor in exercising primary assignments and is also eligible to replace a dead, impeached, absent or ill Governor as required by the 1999 Constitution of Nigeria.

== List of deputy governors ==
Name	Took office	Left office	Time in office	Party	Elected	Governor
Paul Alabi	29 May 1999	29 May 2003	4 years	Alliance for Democracy	1999	Niyi Adebayo
Abiodun Aluko	29 May 2003	November 2005	2 years, 5 months	Peoples Democratic Party	2003	Ayo Fayose
Abiodun Olujimi (born 1958)	November 2005	16 October 2006	11 months	Peoples Democratic Party		Ayo Fayose
Sikiru Tae Lawal	29 May 2007	17 February 2009	1 year, 8 months	Peoples Democratic Party	2007	Olusegun Oni
Sikiru Tae Lawal	6 May 2009	15 October 2010	1 year, 5 months	Peoples Democratic Party	2009	Olusegun Oni
Funmilayo Olayinka (1960–2013)	16 October 2010	6 April 2013	2 years, 5 months	Action Congress of Nigeria		Kayode Fayemi
Modupe Adelabu	April 2013	16 October 2014	1 year, 6 months	All Progressives Congress		Kayode Fayemi
Kolapo Olushola	16 October 2014	16 October 2018	4 years	Peoples Democratic Party	2014	Ayo Fayose
Bisi Egbeyemi (1944–2023)	16 October 2018	16 October 2022	4 years	All Progressives Congress	2018	Kayode Fayemi
Monisade Afuye (born 1958)	16 October 2022	Incumbent	3 years, 326 days	All Progressives Congress	2022	Biodun Oyebanji

== See also ==
- List of governors of Ekiti State
