= 2022 Ekiti State gubernatorial election =

2022 gubernatorial election in Ekiti State, Nigeria

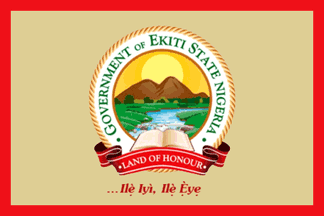
- 18 June 2022
- Turnout: 36.47%
Nominee	Abiodun Oyebanji	Olusegun Oni	Bisi Kolawole
Party	APC	SDP	PDP
Running mate	Monisade Afuye	Ladi Owolabi	Kolapo Kolade
Popular vote	187,057	82,211	67,457
Percentage	53.16%	23.37%	19.17%
- Result by local government area
Governor before election
Kayode Fayemi
APC
Elected Governor
Abiodun Oyebanji
APC

The 2022 Ekiti State gubernatorial election took place on 18 June 2022, to elect the Governor of Ekiti State. Incumbent APC governor Kayode Fayemi was term-limited and could not seek a third term. Former Secretary to the State Government Abiodun Oyebanji held the office for the APC by a 30% margin over first runner-up and SDP nominee—former Governor Olusegun Oni.

The primaries were scheduled for between 4 and 29 January with the All Progressives Congress nominating Oyebanji in a direct primary on 27 January while the People's Democratic Party nominated former Commissioner for Environment Bisi Kolawole in an indirect primary on 26 January. Both primaries were plagued by accusations of candidate imposition and were criticized by activists but both parties accepted the victors as their legitimate nominees. However, Oni, who came second in the PDP primary, rejected the primary results before leaving the party and accepting the nomination of the smaller Social Democratic Party.

The general election was noted by its great logistical organisation and peaceful voting, despite a turbulent campaign period marked by several notable interparty clashes. By the early morning of 19 June, collation completed and INEC declared Oyebanji as the victor. In total, Oyebanji obtained about 187,000 votes and 53% of the vote as runner-up Oni received around 82,000 votes and 23% of the vote while Kolawole came third with over 67,000 votes and 19% of the vote. Electoral analysis focused on the impact of the ruinous divides within the state PDP compared to the state APC's post-primary reconciliation along with the draw of Oni's candidacy. Civil society and election observer groups concentrated on instances of vote-buying along the highly successful election administration by INEC which resulted in smooth voting, direct online transmission of results, and one of the earliest winner declarations in recent Nigerian history as the result was announced on the night of the election.

== Electoral system ==
The Governor of Ekiti State is elected using a modified two-round system. To be elected in the first round, a candidate must receive the plurality of the vote and over 25% of the vote in at least two-thirds of state local government areas. If no candidate passes this threshold, a second round will be held between the top candidate and the next candidate to have received a plurality of votes in the highest number of local government areas.

== Background ==
Ekiti State is a small, Yoruba-majority southwestern state with vast natural areas but facing an underdeveloped yet vital agricultural sector, high unemployment, and rising debt. The state also has to contend with insecurity with abated, but still present, conflict between herders and farmers in the state's rural areas.

Politically, Fayemi's 2018 victory was a forerunner of the state's movement in the 2019 elections with the federal elections being categorized by a massive swing to the APC as its presidential nominee Muhammadu Buhari won the state back after the PDP had won it in 2015. Legislatively the APC also gained ground, winning all two Senate seats, all six House of Representatives seats, and control of the House of Assembly.

Ahead of Fayemi's term, his policy focuses included education, healthcare, infrastructure, mineral resources, and agriculture development. In terms of his performance, Fayemi was commended for taking steps towards fighting climate change and preserving the environment but was criticized for a poor response to the killing of protesting students by his wife's security detail, denying constitutionally-guaranteed local government autonomy, and threatening to illegally dismiss striking health workers.

== Primary elections ==
The primaries, along with any potential challenges to primary results, are scheduled for between 4 and 29 January. According to some candidates and community leaders under the group Ekiti South Agenda Forum, an informal zoning gentlemen's agreement sets the Ekiti South Senatorial District to have the next governor as since the 1999 return of democracy, all Ekiti governors have come from either the Ekiti Central or Ekiti North Senatorial Districts. However, neither major party closed their primaries to non-Southerners or ended up nominating a Southerner.

=== All Progressives Congress ===
Reports from early 2021 indicated that Governor Kayode Fayemi had told members of his Executive Council with plans to run for governor in 2022 to resign, as he wanted his administration to stay on task. These reports were confirmed in early December with Fayemi officially issuing a directive for any appointee planning to run for governor to resign by 18 December. Rivalries within the APC, partially stemming from divisions during the 2018 gubernatorial primary, caused many internal crises between 2018 and 2021 culminating in South West Agenda for Asiwaju (SAWGA), a pro-Tinubu APC faction, suing to stop the 2021 APC ward and local government congresses which were held anyway. Analysts viewed the Ekiti APC as volatile and in need of consensus agreements to bridge internal divides. One of the most major causes for internal strife was the alleged support Fayemi gave to former Secretary to the State Government Abiodun Oyebanji's gubernatorial candidacy.

In November 2021, the APC announced that its expression of interest form would cost ₦2.5 million and the nomination form would cost ₦20 million with a 50% discount for women candidates and candidates with disabilities. Initially, the party set its direct primary date for 22 January 2022 but the timetable was shifted in early January 2022 as the sale of forms was now to end on 15 January while the primary date became 27 January.

Allegations of candidate imposition by Fayemi sowed doubt in the primary's fairness in the days before the election, with reports that Fayemi successfully lobbied for Jigawa State Governor, Mohammed Badaru Abubakar, to be appointed chair of the primary committee and allegedly bribed primary committee members with ₦1.2 billion to guarantee Oyebanji's victory. Such extreme efforts were speculated to be connected to Fayemi's desire to have an ally as his successor to give a boost to his likely presidential candidacy. Further reports with photos of INEC officials dining with Fayemi at the Government House on the night before the primary led a Sahara Reporters APC source to contend that the "primary seems compromised already." The allegations were the catalyst for the withdrawal of all other APC candidates on the primary day as the seven aspirants called for the primary to be postponed due to its 'hijacking in favor of Oyebanji.' However, the primary committee secretary, Victor Olabimtan, said in a statement later on 27 January that the primary would continue as scheduled. When collation completed, Abubakar declared Oyebanji as the APC nominee after announced results showed Oyebanji winning nearly 97% of the votes cast with 59% turnout. In the days after the primary, both Ojo and Adeyeye declared their intention to challenge the results while Abubakar defended the primary's fairness and Oyebanji said his opponents should appeal to the primary appeal panel. Bamidele also said he would challenge the results before backtracking a few weeks later while maintaining the belief that the primary was a sham.

==== Nominated ====
- Abiodun Oyebanji: former Secretary to the State Government, former Commissioner of Budget, Economic Planning and Service Delivery, former Commissioner of Integration and Inter-Governmental Affairs
  - Running mate: Monisade Afuye

==== Withdrew ====
- Adebayo Clement Adeyeye: former Senator for Ekiti South, 2018 PDP gubernatorial candidate, and former Minister of State for Works
- Oluwatoyin Oluwasola Afolabi
- Abiodun Aluko: former Deputy Governor, Mega Party gubernatorial candidate, and 2018 Accord gubernatorial nominee
- Makinde Araoye: Special Adviser on Federal and Intergovernmental Matters to Governor Fayemi
- Michael Opeyemi Bamidele: Senator for Ekiti Central, former House of Representatives member, and former Lagos State cabinet official
- Richard Bamisile: House of Representatives member for Emure/Gbonyin/Ekiti East and 2018 APC gubernatorial candidate
- Reuben Famuyibo: businessman, 2003 Ekiti State gubernatorial candidate, and 1993 SDP presidential candidate (defected prior to the primary to successfully run in the Accord gubernatorial primary)
- Bamidele Faparusi: former Commissioner for Infrastructure and Public Utilities and 2018 APC gubernatorial candidate
- Kayode Ojo: businessman, engineer, and 2018 APC gubernatorial candidate
- Ademola Popoola: aviation consultant

==== Declined ====
- Adeyemi Adaramodu: House of Representatives member for Ekiti South West/Ikere/Ise/Orun
- Diran Adesua: Commissioner for Housing and Urban Development
- Funminiyi Afuye: Speaker of the Ekiti State House of Assembly
- Bolaji Aluko: former Federal University, Otuoke Vice-Chancellor, Coordinator of the Ekiti State COVID-19 Task Force, and Director-General of the Office of Transformation and Service Delivery
- Olawale Fapohunda, state Attorney-General and Commissioner of Justice
- Babafemi Ojudu: former Senator for Ekiti Central and Special Adviser to President Muhammadu Buhari on Political Matters
- Muyiwa Olumilua: Commissioner for Investments, Trade and Industries
- Biodun Omoleye: Chief of Staff to Governor Fayemi
- Paul Omotoso: former Ekiti State APC Chairman
- Mojisola Yaya-Kolade: former Commissioner for Health and Human Services, 2018 APC gubernatorial candidate, and ICPC Commissioner nominee

==== Results ====
Candidates' vote share
1. Abiodun Oyebanji (96.9%)
2. Other candidates (3.12%)

APC primary results
Party	Candidate	Votes	%
APC	Abiodun Oyebanji	101,703	96.88%
APC	Kayode Ojo (withdrawn)	767	0.73%
APC	Michael Opeyemi Bamidele (withdrawn)	760	0.72%
APC	Adebayo Clement Adeyeye (withdrawn)	691	0.66%
APC	Richard Bamisile (withdrawn)	400	0.38%
APC	Bamidele Faparusi (withdrawn)	376	0.36%
APC	Ademola Popoola (withdrawn)	239	0.23%
APC	Oluwatoyin Oluwasola Afolabi (withdrawn)	47	0.04%
Total votes		104,983	100.00
Turnout		107,877	58.77%

===== By local government area =====
LGA	Oyebanji		Ojo		Bamidele		Others		Total votes
LGA	#	%	#	%	#	%	#	%	#
Ado Ekiti	49,380	98.90%	129	0.26%	150	0.30%	271	0.54%	49,930
Efon	3,047	100.00%	0	0.00%	0	0.00%	0	0.00%	3,047
Ekiti East	5,574	98.25%	1	0.02%	62	1.11%	35	0.62%	5,673
Ekiti South-West	5,880	93.14%	149	2.36%	83	1.31%	201	3.18%	6,313
Ekiti West	11,319	97.55%	118	1.02%	120	1.03%	46	0.40%	11,603
Emure	4,018	94.08%	47	1.10%	57	1.33%	149	3.49%	4,271
Gbonyin	5,690	96.21%	50	0.85%	57	0.96%	117	1.98%	5,914
Ido-Osi	5368	97.44%	27	0.49%	46	0.83%	68	1.23%	5509
Ijero Ekiti	6,714	97.23%	35	0.51%	48	0.70%	108	1.56%	6,905
Ikere-Ekiti	5,546	99.48%	17	0.30%	12	0.22%	0	0.00%	5,575
Ikole	9,619	97.77%	55	0.56%	63	0.64%	101	1.03%	9,838
Ilejemeje	3,011	97.47%	20	0.65%	19	0.62%	39	1.26%	3,089
Irepodun/Ifelodun	4,297	98.08%	2	0.05%	66	1.51%	16	0.37%	4381
Ise/Orun	4,048	96.47%	0	0.00%	9	0.21%	139	3.31%	4,196
Moba	8,193	97.92%	38	0.45%	18	0.22%	118	1.41%	8,367
Oye	9,359	95.80%	84	0.86%	39	0.40%	287	2.94%	9,769
Totals	101,703	96.88%	767	0.73%	760	0.72%	1753	1.67%	104,983

=== People's Democratic Party ===
In 2021, the primary race was seen as a proxy battle between former Governor Ayo Fayose (backer of Bisi Kolawole) and Ekiti South Senator Abiodun Olujimi (major candidate), who served as Fayose's Deputy Governor in 2005 and 2006. The primary was tracking be the culmination of a lengthy battle between the two over control of the Ekiti PDP along with being an offshoot of the wider battle between Fayose and incumbent Oyo State Governor Seyi Makinde over control of the southwestern PDP. While the division between Fayose and Olujimi was the main break in the Ekiti PDP, those two groups along with the Oni group (supporting and led by former Governor Olusegun Oni), the Eleka group (supporting and led by Kolapo Olushola), the Aribisala group (supporting and led by Adewale Aribisala), and the Adaramodu group (supporting and led by Kayode Adaramodu) all held significant sway in the state PDP. Prior to the primary in January 2021, Fayose and Olujimi held a series of meetings, reportedly at the behest of newly elected national PDP Chair Iyorchia Ayu, to resolve their dispute. The reconciliation meetings led to speculation that other candidates would be sidelined in favor of an agreement between Fayose and Olujimi.

In early November 2021, the PDP had formed an eight-member screening committee to review all prospective candidates on 8 November at the PDP National Secretariat in Abuja. On 5 January, the PDP rescheduled its primaries from 28 January to 26 January. Upon the 15 January ward congresses to elect delegates for the primary, Olujimi (along with fellow candidates Lateef Ajijola, Adewale Aribisala, Kolapo Olusola, and Olusegun Oni) rejected the results and accused Fayose of hijacking the exercise. To avoid complete crisis, the national PDP annulled the ward congresses two days before the election and stated that the primary will use statutory/automatic delegates lists instead.

Despite the nullification of the ward congresses, on primary day, disputes between different camps led to violence breaking out at the election venue. Later on 26 January, Olujimi withdrew from the primary, decrying the process' unlevel playing field and claiming that the delegate lists had been doctored. When collation completed, head of the primary committee and Akwa Ibom State Governor Udom Emmanuel declared Kolawole as the PDP nominee after announced results showed Kolawole defeating former Governor Olusegun Oni and former Deputy Governor Kolapo Olushola by over 300 votes. The day after the primary, the national PDP set up a primary appeal panel chaired by its national chairman, Iyorchia Ayu which upheld Kolawole's victory after meeting on 28 January. The panel failed to reconcile the candidates with Oni leaving the party on 6 February 2022 while a few days later Olujimi said that she was considering defecting as well. Later that week, the Kolawole campaign formed reconciliation committees in an attempt to prevent further internal party strife and defections.

==== Nominated ====
- Bisi Kolawole: former Ekiti State PDP Chairman, former Commissioner for Environment, and former House of Assembly member
  - Running mate: Kolapo Kolade

==== Eliminated in primary ====
- Kayode Adaramodu: former Deputy Managing Director of the Guarantee Trust Bank
- Adewumi Adesoye: princess of Ado-Ekiti
- Adekemi Adewumi: 2019 PDP House of Representatives candidate and widow of Chief of the Air Staff Ibrahim Mahmud Alfa
- Lateef Ajijola: businessman and 2015 PDP Ekiti Central senatorial candidate
- Titilayo Owolabi Akerele: former House of Assembly member
- Yinka Akerele: 2007 PDP gubernatorial candidate and 2007 ANPP gubernatorial nominee
- Deborah Alo
- Arogundade Oluwatoyin Anike: former Ekiti Central Tutor-General
- Adewale Aribisala: former House of Representatives member and PDP National Treasurer
- Module Asaolu
- Cecilia Ebiesuwa: 2019 PDP House of Assembly candidate
- Deji Ogunsakin: former Ado Ekiti LG Chairman and 2018 PDP deputy gubernatorial nominee
- Olukemi Olubunmi Olumide-Ojo: former House of Assembly member
- Kolapo Olushola: former Deputy Governor and 2018 PDP gubernatorial nominee
- Olusegun Oni: former Governor and 2018 APC gubernatorial candidate (defected after to the primary to successfully run in the SDP gubernatorial primary)
- Titilayo Owolabi Akerele: former House of Assembly member

==== Withdrew ====
- Abiodun Olujimi: Senator for Ekiti South and former Deputy Governor

==== Declined ====
- Dare Bejide: former Ambassador to Canada, former Secretary to Ekiti State Government, 2018 PDP gubernatorial candidate, and 2018 PPN gubernatorial nominee
- Segun Adekola: House of Representatives member for Ekiti South West/Ikere/Ise/Orun
- Sikiru Tae-Lawal: former Deputy Governor

==== Results ====
Candidates' vote share
1. Bisi Kolawole (57.2%)
2. Olusegun Oni (28.2%)
3. Kolapo Olushola (7.94%)
4. Other candidates (6.65%)

PDP primary results
Party	Candidate	Votes	%
PDP	Bisi Kolawole	671	57.25%
PDP	Olusegun Oni	330	28.16%
PDP	Kolapo Olushola	93	7.94%
PDP	Adewale Aribisala	56	4.78%
PDP	Kayode Adaramodu	10	0.85%
PDP	Deji Ogunsakin	6	0.51%
PDP	Abiodun Olujimi (withdrawn)	2	0.17%
PDP	Adekemi Adewumi	1	0.09%
PDP	Lateef Ajijola	1	0.09%
PDP	Deborah Alo	1	0.09%
PDP	Olukemi Olubunmi Olumide-Ojo	1	0.09%
Total votes		1,172	100.0

=== Minor parties ===
==== Nominees ====
- Reuben Famuyibo (Accord)
  - Running mate: Olumide Ezekiel Falana
- Moses Olajide Ajagunigbala (African Action Congress)
  - Running mate: Oludele Oluwabunmi
- Oluwole Oluyede (African Democratic Congress)
  - Running mate: Hidiat Simbo Popoola
- Kemi Josephine Elebute-Halle (Action Democratic Party)
  - Running mate: Idowu Afuye
- Benjamin Olufemi Obidoyin (All Progressives Grand Alliance)
  - Running mate: Oluwafemi Anthony Faeji
- Peter Adegbenro Fagbemi (Allied Peoples Movement)
  - Running mate: Oluwatosin Eunice Akinyeye
- Christiana Modupe Olatawura (Action Peoples Party)
  - Running mate: Ibukun Solomon Owolabi
- Olugbenga Daramola (Labour Party)
  - Running mate: Ibrahim Yusuf Onile
- Oladosu Abiodun Fatomilola (New Nigeria Peoples Party)
  - Running mate: Oluwatoyin Hannah Ade-Ajayi
- Ifedayo Iyaniwura (National Rescue Movement)
  - Running mate: Arowolo Kayode Williams
- Olaniyi Ben Agboola (People's Redemption Party)
  - Running mate: Tolulope Ogidan
- Olusegun Oni (Social Democratic Party)
  - Running mate: Ladi Owolabi
- Adebowale Oluranti Ajayi (Young Progressives Party)
  - Running mate: Nureni Babatunde Olaseni
- Kolade Akinyemi Adeolu (Zenith Labour Party)
  - Running mate: Akintoye Damilola

== Campaign ==
Immediately after the primaries, analysts marked the election as a proxy battle between outgoing governor Kayode Fayemi (APC) and former governor Ayo Fayose (PDP) despite being the first Ekiti gubernatorial election since 1999 in which neither Fayemi nor Fayose are candidates. Kolawole and Oyebanji are both extensively connected to Fayemi and Fayose, respectively, leading to the labeling of the general election as a continuation of the power struggle between the two. However, the emergence of Olusegun Oni, a former Governor who came second in the PDP primary, as the SDP nominee turned the general election into a three-way race according to some political pundits, adding even more uncertainty to the election.

For both major candidates, the early parts of the general election campaign were dominated by attempts to address controversies around their respective primaries and unify their parties. For the PDP's Kolawole, he claimed that his main primary opponent Olujimi had not dropped out due to irregularities, instead that she wanted to "avoid being embarrassed [by losing]." Meanwhile, other PDP figures like Akwa Ibom State Governor Udom Emmanuel asked those defeated in the primary to support Kolawole while Fayose reached out to his rival Oyo State Governor Seyi Makinde to campaign in Ekiti. Similarly in the APC, Oyebanji asked his primary opponents to put aside their differences and work with him during the general election campaign. However, Ekiti APC Publicity Secretary Segun Dipe took a more abrasive tone, disregarding the other candidates’ allegation that Oyebanji supporters were named electoral officers by saying they merely knew Oyebanji and it was his popularity that won the primary, not fraud. For the minor parties like Accord, the crises in the major parties were seen as an opportunity to accrue support and compete in the general election. The major party discord also directly led to the Social Democratic Party gaining Oni as its nominee after Oni claimed to have been cheated out of the PDP nomination.

Pundits noted that regional unity, not just party unity, would also be required for successful campaigns. Candidates from the Ekiti South Senatorial District, which has never produced an elected governor, were passed over for major party nominations as Oyebanji is from Ikogosi while Kolawole is from Efon, both in Ekiti Central Senatorial District. Similarly, Oni is from the Central District, more specifically Ifaki-Ekiti. Thus it was expected that the major candidates would pick running mates from Ekiti South, although groups lobbying for a governor from Ekiti South preemptively compared southern politicians accepting a deputy slot to "Judas Iscariot." Oyebanji and Kolawole followed this expectation in choosing southerners (Monisade Afuye from Ikere-Ekiti and Kolapo Kolade from Emure, respectively) while Oni bucked the trend, picking Ladi Owolabi from the central Ado Ekiti.

In April 2022, as the election neared, campaigning ramped up with Oyebanji announcing a six-point development agenda and Kolawole declaring his plans for a return to Fayose's stomach infrastructure policy along with vowing to combat insecurity. Oni also hit the campaign trail in April with promises of a return to his governorship's policies but his supporters were attacked at a rally on 6 April; the attack compounded with previous politically-motivated attacks in 2021 and 2022 led to fears of more electoral violence.

In May and June, policy debates continued with Oni focusing on healthcare and education; Kolawole aiming for improving agriculture, healthcare, women's rights, and economic development; and Oyebanji basing his plans on continuing the work of the Fayemi administration. The policy discussion culminated in a pact on good governance publicly signed by the major contenders on 6 June and a televised debate on 12 June. However, the fears of electoral violence rang true as at least one person was killed in a APC-SDP clash and the parties in opposition alleged that the APC plotted to harass their voters on election day. To combat the violence, eleven candidates signed a peace accord on 15 June at the behest of the National Peace Committee. Analysis directly before the election confirmed that the race was between Kolawole, Oni, and Oyebanji while noting the high confidence of all three campaigns.

== Conduct ==
=== Electoral timetable ===
In January 2022, the Independent National Electoral Commission released the timetable, setting out key dates and deadlines for the election.

- 3 January 2022 – Publication of Notice of Election
- 4 January 2022 – First day for the conduct of party primaries
- 29 January 2022 – Final day for the conduct of party primaries, including the resolution of disputes arising from them
- 31 January 2022 – First day for submission of nomination forms to INEC via the online portal
- 4 February 2022 – Final day for submission of nomination forms to INEC via the online portal
- 20 March 2022 – Commencement of the official campaign period
- 16 June 2022 – Final day of the official campaign period
- 18 June 2022 – Election Day

=== Pre-election ===
As the election neared, INEC and other authorities started announcing their preparations with the election commission announcing that it would deploy 10,269 staffers to polling units on election day along with 3,346 BVAS machines. For the Nigeria Police Force, a statement on 14 June noted that police would deploy Deputy Inspector-General Johnson Babatunde Kokumo to be coordinator of election security efforts that would include thousands of conventional police officers and soldiers along with special forces, five armored personnel carriers, four helicopters, and drones.

=== Election Day ===
On election day, voting was almost entirely peaceful and logistically well-organized but overshadowed by reports of mass vote buying from party agents of the three main contenders. A joint statement by media organizations with observing journalists at polling units said that party agents were offering voters as much as ₦10,000 for votes and implored voters not to sell their votes. On the other hand, INEC was commended for successful election administration as the vast majority of polling units had early-arriving officials, security operatives, and well-functioning equipment according to preliminary reports from election observers CDD West Africa, Nigeria Civil Society Situation Room, and YIAGA Africa. Through a YIAGA-Channels TV partnership, results uploaded by INEC were able directly broadcast live for the first time.

== General election ==
=== Results ===
Candidates' vote share
1. Abiodun Oyebanji (APC) (53.2%)
2. Olusegun Oni (SDP) (23.4%)
3. Bisi Kolawole (PDP) (19.2%)
4. Other candidates (4.30%)

2022 Ekiti State gubernatorial election
Party	Candidate	Votes	%
APC	Abiodun Oyebanji	187,057	53.16%
SDP	Olusegun Oni	82,211	23.37%
PDP	Bisi Kolawole	67,457	19.17%
ADC	Oluwole Oluyede	5,597	1.59%
ADP	Kemi Josephine Elebute-Halle	3,495	0.99%
APP	Christiana Modupe Olatawura	1,980	0.56%
PRP	Olaniyi Ben Agboola	856	0.24%
YPP	Adebowale Oluranti Ajayi	618	0.18%
New Nigeria Peoples Party	Oladosu Abiodun Fatomilola	529	0.15%
AAC	Moses Olajide Ajagunigbala	409	0.12%
APGA	Benjamin Olufemi Obidoyin	376	0.11%
NRM	Ifedayo Iyaniwura	347	0.10%
APM	Peter Adegbenro Fagbemi	290	0.08%
ZLP	Kolade Akinyemi Adeolu	282	0.08%
LP	Olugbenga Daramola	195	0.05%
A	Reuben Famuyibo	166	0.05%
Total votes		351,865	100.0%
Invalid or blank votes		8,888	N/A
Turnout		360,753	36.47%
APC hold			

==== By local government area ====
The results of the election by local government area.

LGA	Oyebanji APC		Kolawole PDP		Oni SDP		Others		Total votes
LGA	#	%	#	%	#	%	#	%	#
Ado Ekiti	23,831	48.67%	7,575	15.47%	15,214	31.07%	2,344	4.79%	48,964
Efon	4,012	37.01%	6,303	58.15%	339	3.13%	185	1.71%	10,839
Ekiti East	12,099	52.45%	5,230	22.67%	4,982	21.60%	754	3.27%	23,065
Ekiti South-West	9,679	49.79%	4,474	23.01%	4,577	23.54%	711	3.66%	19,441
Ekiti West	15,322	66.13%	3,386	14.62%	3,863	16.67%	597	2.58%	23,168
Emure	7,728	54.43%	2,610	18.38%	3,445	24.27%	414	2.92%	14,197
Gbonyin	11,247	55.61%	3,947	19.87%	4,059	20.43%	614	3.09%	19,867
Ido-Osi	10,321	44.29%	2,871	12.32%	9,489	40.71%	624	2.68%	23,305
Ijero Ekiti	13,754	56.42%	4,897	20.09%	5,006	20.53%	722	2.96%	24,379
Ikere-Ekiti	12,086	54.44%	3,789	17.07%	1,943	8.75%	4,383	19.74%	22,201
Ikole	16,417	55.69%	6,266	21.25%	5,736	19.46%	1,062	3.6%	29,481
Ilejemeje	4,357	52.99%	1,157	14.07%	2,344	28.50%	365	4.44%	8,223
Irepodun/Ifelodun	13,125	55.81%	4,712	20.04%	5,010	21.31%	668	2.84%	23,515
Ise/Orun	8,074	47.00%	2,588	15.06%	5,909	34.40%	608	3.54%	17,179
Moba	11,609	56.95%	3,530	17.32%	4,904	24.06%	341	1.67%	20,384
Oye	13,396	56.61%	4,122	17.42%	5,391	22.78%	757	3.21%	23,666
Totals	187,057	53.16%	67,457	19.17%	82,211	23.37%	15,140	4.30%	351,865

=== Response ===
==== Candidates and parties ====
After the full results were released in the early morning of 19 June, Oyebanji declared victory amid the celebrations of his supporters before thanking his former opponents and the people of Ekiti State. Kolawole accepted the results in a congratulatory letter to Oyebanji and wished him the best in governance; on the other hand, the Segun Oni Campaign Organisation rejected the results due to the reports of vote buying along with further allegations of security force bias. Similarly, Kemi Josephine Elebute-Halle–the ADP nominee who was one of the more prominent minor party nominees–rejected the results on grounds of "vote buying and corruption."

On the national level, President Muhammadu Buhari and APC National Chairman Abdullahi Adamu congratulated Oyebanji and praised the Independent National Electoral Commission and law enforcement agencies.

==== Civil society ====
From civil society, post-results reports again praised INEC along with security forces for the credible and safe election. The nonprofit YIAGA Africa, which monitored the election and ran a parallel vote tabulation, stated that PVT had verified the accuracy of INEC's released results as the released totals for the three major candidates fell well within the ranges estimated by PVT. YIAGA stated that INEC's turnout and rejected ballot numbers were in estimated ranges as well. However, groups like the Nigeria Civil Society Situation Room showcased the vote buying reports and noted that the reports followed a worrying trend in both Ekiti and nationwide elections.

=== Analysis ===
In the days after the election, political analysts noted several post-election takeaways: organizationally, pundits focused on the vote buying reports and the improvement of INEC administration while noting the high number of invalid votes. Political takeaways included the waning electoral influence of former Governor Ayo Fayose (PDP), the Bisi Adeleye-Fayemi and Kayode Fayemi-led APC turnout effort, the divides within the state PDP, and the staying power of Oni along with pointing out that the APC has become the first party ever to win consecutive Ekiti gubernatorial elections. Pundits also noted that the state PDP fell back into its crisis immediately after Kolawole's loss.

== Aftermath ==
=== Litigation ===
On 7 July, Oni challenged the results at the Election Petition Tribunal stating that "I [am] challenging the election result because I believe that I won." The three-member tribunal began sitting on 26 July in Ado Ekiti with judge Wilfred Kpochi with Sa’ad Zadawa and Jacob Atsen as additional judges. On the first day of proceedings, Kpochi called on parties to cooperate with the tribunal before the panel granted Oni's request for access to the election materials for inspection. Similarly, the APC's request for election materials was granted in late August. In their arguments, Oni's team challenged the validity of the APC primary along with claiming irregularities in the general election while Oyebanji's defense centered on a jurisdictional dispute as the APC claimed the tribunal did not have the jurisdiction to settle the contested primary. Pre-hearing formalities ended on 16 September ahead of the full hearing later that month. After the full proceedings, the Tribunal ruled against Oni's challenge on 29 December 2022; Oni immediately vowed to appeal the decision.

=== Transition and inauguration ===
Oyebanji and Afuye received the certificates of return on 23 June in a ceremony at the Ekiti State INEC head office in Ado Ekiti. A few days later, Fayemi created a transition committee headed by SSG Foluso Daramola and an advisory council chaired by Deputy Governor Bisi Egbeyemi; members of the panels were nominated by both the state government and the governor-elect in line with the Ekiti State Transition Law, 2019.

The inauguration was held on 16 October at the Ekiti Parapo Pavilion in Ado Ekiti. Attendees included Governor Fayemi, former Governor Ayo Fayose, several APC governors and the party's presidential nominee Bola Tinubu. Oyebanji was sworn in by the Chief Judge of Ekiti State—Oyewole Adeyeye; Oyebanji then went onto give an inaugural address that outlined his updated six-point agenda.

== See also ==
- 2022 Nigerian elections
- 2022 Nigerian gubernatorial elections
