= State Executive Council (Nigeria) =

Nigerian state cabinets

In the Federal Republic of Nigeria, state executive councils (informally known as "cabinets") are the highest formal governmental body in state governments headed by governors.

== Functions ==
The executive council is responsible for advising and assisting the governor in the performance of their official duties. As all of its members excluding the deputy governor are appointed by the governor, individuals who have been appointed to serve in the council may also be dismissed or reappointed to other posts at the governor's discretion. The entire council may also be dissolved if the governor wishes for a complete reshuffle or a motion of no confidence in the governor is passed.

== General structure ==
It usually (depending on the state) consists of the governor, the Deputy Governor, Secretary to the State Government, Chief of Staff, head of the State Civil Service, commissioners who preside over ministerial departments, along with the special aides and advisers to the governor and their deputies. The Governor designates duties to commissioners, who are in turn assigned portfolios within their areas of responsibility.

== List of executive councils ==
- Executive Council of Abia State
- Executive Council of Adamawa State
- Executive Council of Akwa Ibom State
- Executive Council of Anambra State
- Executive Council of Bauchi State
- Executive Council of Bayelsa State
- Executive Council of Benue State
- Executive Council of Borno State
- Executive Council of Cross River State
- Executive Council of Delta State
- Executive Council of Ebonyi State
- Executive Council of Edo State
- Executive Council of Ekiti State
- Executive Council of Enugu State
- Executive Council of Gombe State
- Executive Council of Imo State
- Executive Council of Jigawa State
- Executive Council of Kaduna State
- Executive Council of Kano State
- Executive Council of Katsina State
- Executive Council of Kebbi State
- Executive Council of Kogi State
- Executive Council of Kwara State
- Executive Council of Lagos State
- Executive Council of Nasarawa State
- Executive Council of Niger State
- Executive Council of Ogun State
- Executive Council of Ondo State
- Executive Council of Osun State
- Executive Council of Oyo State
- Executive Council of Plateau State
- Executive Council of Rivers State
- Executive Council of Sokoto State
- Executive Council of Taraba State
- Executive Council of Yobe State
- Executive Council of Zamfara State

== See also ==
- Executive Council (South Africa)
