= Nigeria Governors' Forum =

Political organisation

- Abbreviation: NGF
- Formation: 29 May 1999; 27 years ago
- Type: Political
- Region served: Nigeria
- Chairman: AbdulRahman AbdulRazaq (APC, Kwara)
- Vice Chairman: Seyi Makinde (PDP, Oyo)
- Affiliations: Progressive Governors Forum (APC); PDP Governors Forum (PDP)

The Nigeria Governors' Forum is a non-partisan association that was created to enhance collaboration among the executive governors of Nigeria. As of 2024, the Chairman of the association is Governor AbdulRahman AbdulRazaq of Kwara State.

== Aims and objectives ==
- Forum for public policy discussions
- Promote inclusive governance
- Promote sustainable development
- Promote collaboration between the governors and society

== List of current state governors ==
Party affiliation of current Nigerian state governors: APC (31 states) APM (2 states) Accord (1 state) APGA (1 state) Labour (1 state)

Governor	State	Elected/Took office	Party
Alex Otti	Abia State	2023	Labour Party
Ahmadu Umaru Fintiri	Adamawa State	2019	All Progressives Congress
Umo Eno	Akwa Ibom State	2023	All Progressives Congress
Charles Soludo	Anambra State	2022	All Progressives Grand Alliance
Bala Muhammed	Bauchi State	2019	Allied Peoples Movement
Douye Diri	Bayelsa State	2020	All Progressives Congress
Hyacinth Alia	Benue State	2023	All Progressives Congress
Babagana Zulum	Borno State	2019	All Progressives Congress
Bassey Otu	Cross River State	2023	All Progressives Congress
Sheriff Oborevwori	Delta State	2023	All Progressives Congress
Francis Nwifuru	Ebonyi State	2023	All Progressives Congress
Monday Okpebholo	Edo State	2024	All Progressives Congress
Biodun Oyebanji	Ekiti State	2022	All Progressives Congress
Peter Mbah	Enugu State	2023	All Progressives Congress
Muhammad Inuwa Yahaya	Gombe State	2019	All Progressives Congress
Hope Uzodinma	Imo State	2020	All Progressives Congress
Umar Namadi	Jigawa State	2023	All Progressives Congress
Uba Sani	Kaduna State	2023	All Progressives Congress
Abba Kabir Yusuf	Kano State	2023	All Progressives Congress
Dikko Umaru Radda	Katsina State	2023	All Progressives Congress
Nasir Idris	Kebbi State	2023	All Progressives Congress
Ahmed Usman Ododo	Kogi State	2024	All Progressives Congress
AbdulRahman AbdulRasaq (Chairman)	Kwara State	2019	All Progressives Congress
Babajide Sanwo-Olu	Lagos State	2019	All Progressives Congress
Abdullahi Sule	Nasarawa State	2019	All Progressives Congress
Mohammed Umar Bago	Niger State	2023	All Progressives Congress
Dapo Abiodun	Ogun State	2019	All Progressives Congress
Lucky Aiyedatiwa	Ondo State	2023	All Progressives Congress
Ademola Adeleke	Osun State	2022	Accord Party
Seyi Makinde (Vice Chairman)	Oyo State	2019	Allied Peoples Movement
Caleb Mutfwang	Plateau State	2023	All Progressives Congress
Siminalayi Fubara	Rivers State	2023	All Progressives Congress
Ahmad Aliyu	Sokoto State	2023	All Progressives Congress
Agbu Kefas	Taraba State	2023	All Progressives Congress
Mai Mala Buni	Yobe State	2019	All Progressives Congress
Dauda Lawal	Zamfara State	2023	All Progressives Congress
