= Progressive Governors Forum =

Political organisation

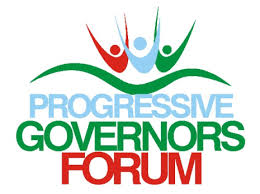
- Chairperson: Hope Uzodinma
- Founded: August 2013; 13 years ago
- Headquarters: Abuja
- Ideology: Social Democratic

Progressive Governors Forum (PGF) is a forum of Nigerian governors elected on the platform of the All Progressives Congress (APC), the mega party which was born of a merger between the Action Congress of Nigeria (ACN), the All Nigeria Peoples Party (ANPP), the Congress for Progressive Change (CPC), and faction of the All Progressives Grand Alliance (APGA). The Forum was formed in the wake of the merger of legacy parties which merged to form the APC and at inception in August 2013, the PGF had 11 member governors comprising Borno, Edo, Ekiti, Imo, Lagos, Nassarawa, Ogun, Osun, Oyo, Yobe, and Zamfara states; this number increased later when five additional governors from the ruling People’s Democratic Party (PDP) defected to the APC after a crisis that gave rise to a faction known as the new-PDP.

Sequel to the new merger with members from the new-PDP, the PGF comprised sixteen governors (Adamawa, Borno, Edo, Ekiti, Imo, Kano, Kwara, Lagos, Nasarawa, Ogun, Oyo, Osun, Rivers, Sokoto, Yobe and Zamfara states), this number, however, reduced to fourteen after Ekiti's Kayode Fayemi lost his re-election bid and Adamawa's Murtala Nyako was impeached, in June and July 2014 respectively.

The APC recorded overwhelming victory in most states and the number of member governors increased to 22 after the 2015 gubernatorial elections. The Forum member governors presently total 31 as at March 2026.

== Aims and Objectives ==
Addressing newsmen in October, 2013, the governors of the All Progressive Congress, APC, described their main goal as organising all APC state governments in order to implement policies which would develop human capital in their respective states and improve the quality of life through job creation, which would, in turn, eradicate poverty. The objectives of the Forum include;

1. Promoting the APC’s social democratic ideals as enshrined in the party’s constitution and manifesto by undertaking policy actions which reflect these in APC-governed states
2. Partnering with other progressive governors in Nigeria, irrespective of whether or not they are members of the APC, in order to promote good governance and deepen the democratic process in the country.
3. Setting a uniform agenda especially with respect to healthcare and education across all APC states, with the aim of establishing and replicating results across board
4. Carrying out initiatives which would make the electioneering process credible and that results truly reflect the wishes of the people
5. To support the party, the APC, in engaging other stakeholders with the aim of strengthening democracy and accountability in government
6. To support the party in its leadership orientation efforts across the country
7. To implement initiatives which would aid the development of the Nigeria Governors Forum (NGF), and enable it take its rightful place as a democratic institution not prone to partisan influences.

== Principles ==
The PGF is founded upon principles which include being social democratic, people-oriented, leading with accountability and being responsive to the needs of the people.

== Structure ==
Members of the PGF meet monthly, with meetings sometimes rotated among states governed by APC Governors while a secretariat in charge of the Forum’s day-to-day activities is run by a Director-General. This secretariat is saddled with the responsibility of implementing the decisions reached by the governors from member states and generating programmes, proposals and recommendations for consideration by the governors.

== The Secretariat ==
The Director-General of the PGF since its inception in August 2013 is Mallam Salihu Lukman, a development economist.

Departments at the PGF include the Finance and Administrative department, the Programs Department – which is further broken into the Governance Program Unit and the Legislative Program Unit, and the Media & Communications Department.

== Members ==
=== Current members ===
The PGF is made up of governors on the platform of the ruling party, APC. There are currently 31 members, they are as follows;

Governor	State	Elected/Took office
Ahmadu Umaru Fintiri	Adamawa State	2019
Umo Eno	Akwa Ibom State	2023
Douye Diri	Bayelsa State	2020
Hyacinth Alia	Benue State	2023
Babagana Zulum	Borno State	2019
Bassey Otu	Cross River State	2023
Sheriff Oborevwori	Delta State	2023
Francis Nwifuru	Ebonyi State	2023
Monday Okpebholo	Edo State	2024
Biodun Oyebanji	Ekiti State	2022
Peter Mbah	Enugu State	2023
Muhammad Inuwa Yahaya	Gombe State	2019
Hope Uzodinma (Chairman)	Imo State	2020
Umar Namadi	Jigawa State	2023
Uba Sani	Kaduna State	2023
Abba Kabir Yusuf	Kano State	2023
Dikko Umaru Radda	Katsina State	2023
Nasir Idris	Kebbi State	2023
Ahmed Usman Ododo	Kogi State	2024
AbdulRahman AbdulRasaq	Kwara State	2019
Babajide Sanwo-Olu	Lagos State	2019
Abdullahi Sule	Nasarawa State	2019
Mohammed Umar Bago	Niger State	2023
Dapo Abiodun	Ogun State	2019
Lucky Aiyedatiwa	Ondo State	2023
Caleb Mutfwang	Plateau State	2023
Siminalayi Fubara	Rivers State	2023
Ahmad Aliyu	Sokoto State	2023
Agbu Kefas	Taraba State	2023
Mai Mala Buni	Yobe State	2019
Dauda Lawal	Zamfara State	2023

== Events and Activities ==
=== First Progressive Governance Lecture ===
On 24 February 2014, the Progressive Governors converged in Ibadan, Oyo State, for the first Progressive Governance Lecture, which was tagged "Unemployment and the Crisis of Governance in Nigeria: The Way Forward". The aim of the lecture was to examine the unemployment crisis in Nigeria in order to proffer solutions which would result in mass job creation.

At the event, the governors stated that they would work on recommendations gathered in order to help direct policy formulation and implementation within APC states.

=== Progressive Governors/Legislators/CSOs Roundtable ===
On Monday, 24 March 2014, the PGF held a roundtable session with legislators within the APC and select Civil Society Organisations. The theme of the roundtable session was ‘Improving governance through transparent budgeting, accountability and effective public financial management'. The event was chaired by the Rivers State governor, Rotimi Amaechi, and some of the issues it was convened to tackle include the lack of transparency and accountability in budget implementation, budget and budget process in the National Assembly, the role of public finance management in good governance, and the 20 billion Dollars reported missing in the Nigerian National Petroleum Commission (NNPC).

A communiqué was issued and some of the recommendations made include establishing a budget timetable in order to ensure that the budgeting process is not dependent upon the Federal Government, strengthening institutions in order to promote accountability in budgeting, designing the budgeting process based on sector plans and not statements of intended expenses (as is currently being done) and making provisions for a closing figure for the previous year before presenting a new budget, among others.

=== Second Progressive Governance Lecture ===
Sequel to the first Progressive Governance Lecture, a second lecture took place in Kano State in May 2014, titled: "Crisis in Nigeria’s Education: Addressing the Connect between Unemployment and Insecurity". At this event, the host, Governor Kwankwaso of Kano State, elucidated on the steps being taken by his administration to reduce the spate of crime by encouraging youths to become educated. This, he said, had been achieved through a free education programme in the state. The Chairman of the PGF, Governor Rochas Okorocha, also asked that politicians work together to combat the scourge of terrorism irrespective of party affiliation.

=== Visit and Donation to Victims of Nyanya Bomb Blast ===
The PGF had, after a terrorist attack in Nyanya, a suburb on the outskirts of Abuja on 14 April 2014, paid visits to victims in the National Hospital, Abuja, and the Asokoro General Hospital and donated a relief fund of N100million.

=== Workshop on Education Policy Design ===
Following deliberations at the first and second Progressive Governance Lectures, this workshop was organised in Port-Harcourt in July 2014 for the purpose of designing policies which would aid educational development in APC states. In attendance were commissioners of education from at least 13 of the 16 APC states and some deputy governors, among other state officials.

=== The APC Governors' Retreat ===
The PGF, before the inauguration of the new administration in May, 2015, organised a retreat for all APC governors (both returning and outgoing) and governors-elect. The aim of the retreat was to design governance strategies which would enable them deliver on the party's campaign promises, and to provide the incoming governors with the necessary knowledge on governance and administrative duties.

== See also ==
- All Progressives Congress
- List of state governors of Nigeria
