= List of state parties of the All Progressives Congress =

This is a list of official state (and FCT) party organizations of the All Progressives Congress.

== State organizations ==
APC majority

State Party	Chair	Elected Executive Offices	Senate Seats	House of Representatives Seats	House of Assembly Seats	Website
National All Progressives Congress	Abdullahi Adamu	2 / 2	66 / 109	224 / 360	598 / 991	
Abia State All Progressives Congress	Kingsley Ononogbu	0 / 2	1 / 3	3 / 8	3 / 24	N/A
Adamawa State All Progressives Congress	Ibrahim Bilal	0 / 2	2 / 3	3 / 8	11 / 25	N/A
Akwa Ibom State All Progressives Congress	Steve Ntukekpo (disputed)	0 / 2	0 / 3	0 / 10	1 / 26	N/A
Anambra State All Progressives Congress	Basil Ejidike	0 / 2	0 / 3	2 / 11	7 / 30	N/A
Bauchi State All Progressives Congress	Babayo Aliyu Misau	0 / 2	3 / 3	8 / 12	16 / 31	N/A
Bayelsa State All Progressives Congress	Dennis Otiotio (disputed)	0 / 2	1 / 3	2 / 5	4 / 20	N/A
Benue State All Progressives Congress	Augustine Agada	0 / 2	0 / 3	3 / 11	5 / 24	N/A
Borno State All Progressives Congress	Ali Bukar Dalori	2 / 2	3 / 3	10 / 10	30 / 30	
Cross River State All Progressives Congress	Alphonsus Eba	2 / 2	0 / 3	4 / 8	18 / 25 (Note: 18 PDP assemblymen defected the APC, but in March 2022 their seats were declared vacant by a court. As appeals are expected to the judgement, the practical situation remains at the status quo.)	N/A
Delta State All Progressives Congress	Omeni Sobotie	0 / 2	2 / 3	1 / 10	2 / 29	N/A
Ebonyi State All Progressives Congress	Stanley Okoro-Emegha	2 / 2	0 / 3	1 / 6	17 / 24 (Note: 17 PDP assemblymen defected the APC in November 2020, but in March 2022 their seats were declared vacant by a court. As appeals are expected to the judgement, the situation remains at the status quo.)	N/A
Edo State All Progressives Congress	David Imuse	0 / 2	1 / 3	4 / 9	1 / 24 (Note: As of December 2021, 14 HOA members (all APC) have not taken office due to a longstanding dispute over their swearing-ins; thus, although the APC number should be 15, the practical number of APC Edo assemblypeople is 1.)	N/A
Ekiti State All Progressives Congress	Paul Omotosho	2 / 2	2 / 3	6 / 6	25 / 26	N/A
Enugu State All Progressives Congress	Agballah faction: Ugochukwu Agballah Orji faction: Joseph Orji Ude faction: Adolphus Ude	0 / 2	0 / 3	0 / 8	0 / 24	N/A
Federal Capital Territory All Progressives Congress	Abdulmalik Usman	N/A (Note: The FCT does not have an elected Governor or Deputy Governor but both of the presidentially-appointed equivalents, the FCT Minister and the FCT Minister of State, are APC members.)	0 / 1	0 / 2	N/A	N/A
Gombe State All Progressives Congress	Nitte Amangal	2 / 2	3 / 3	5 / 6	21 / 24	N/A
Imo State All Progressives Congress	Macdonald Ebere	2 / 2	2 / 3	3 / 10	21 / 27	N/A
Jigawa State All Progressives Congress	Aminu Sani Gumel	2 / 2	3 / 3	11 / 11	30 / 30	N/A
Kaduna State All Progressives Congress	Emmanuel Jekada	2 / 2	2 / 3	11 / 16	20 / 31	N/A
Kano State All Progressives Congress	Abdullahi Abbas	2 / 2	2 / 3	21 / 24	26 / 40	N/A
Katsina State All Progressives Congress	Sani Ali Ahmed	2 / 2	2 / 3	15 / 15	34 / 34	N/A
Kebbi State All Progressives Congress	Abubakar Kana-Zuru	2 / 2	3 / 3	7 / 8	24 / 24	N/A
Kogi State All Progressives Congress	Abdullahi Bello	2 / 2	3 / 3	5 / 9	25 / 25	N/A
Kwara State All Progressives Congress	Sunday Fagbemi	2 / 2	3 / 3	5 / 6	21 / 24	N/A
Lagos State All Progressives Congress	Cornelius Ojelabi	2 / 2	3 / 3	21 / 24	40 / 40	N/A
Nasarawa State All Progressives Congress	John Mamman	2 / 2	3 / 3	4 / 5	20 / 24	N/A
Niger State All Progressives Congress	Haliru Zakari Jikantoro	2 / 2	3 / 3	10 / 10	26 / 27	N/A
Ogun State All Progressives Congress	Yemi Sanusi	2 / 2	3 / 3	7 / 9	25 / 26	N/A
Ondo State All Progressives Congress	Ade Adetimehin	2 / 2	1 / 3	7 / 9	22 / 26	N/A
Osun State All Progressives Congress	Gboyega Famodun	2 / 2	2 / 3	7 / 9	23 / 26	N/A
Oyo State All Progressives Congress	Isaac Omodewu	0 / 2	3 / 3	10 / 14	5 / 32	N/A
Plateau State All Progressives Congress	Rufus Bature	2 / 2	2 / 3	3 / 8	14 / 24	N/A
Rivers State All Progressives Congress	Emeka Bekee	0 / 2	0 / 3	2 / 13	0 / 32	N/A
Sokoto State All Progressives Congress	Isa Sadiq-Achida	0 / 2	3 / 3	7 / 11	13 / 30	N/A
Taraba State All Progressives Congress	Ibrahim Tukur El-Sudi (disputed)	0 / 2	2 / 3	3 / 6	5 / 24	N/A
Yobe State All Progressives Congress	Muhammadu Gadaka	2 / 2	3 / 3	6 / 6	24 / 24	N/A
Zamfara State All Progressives Congress	Tukur Danfulani	2 / 2	2 / 3	6 / 7	21 / 24	N/A
