= Richard Bamisile =

Nigerian politician (born 1965)

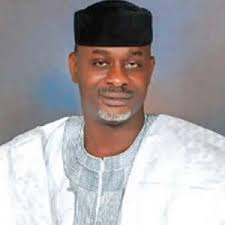

Personal details
- Born: Richard Olufemi Bamisile; September 27, 1965 (age 61) Ibadan, Western State, Nigeria (now in Oyo State, Nigeria)
- Party: All Progressive Congress (APC)
- Education: Government College, Lagos; University of Ado-Ekiti (now Ekiti State University)
- Occupation: Politician, businessman
- Website: www.teambafem.com
- Nickname: BAFEM

Richard Olufemi Bamisile (popularly known as BAFEM; born September 27, 1965) is a Nigerian politician and current member of the Federal House of Representatives for Ekiti South II Constituency. He is also a former Speaker of the Ekiti State House of Assembly (Third Parliament). He was among the candidates for the All Progressive Congress (APC) at the Ekiti State gubernatorial election primaries in 2019.

== Early life ==
Bamisile was born on September 27, 1965, at Ibadan, Oyo State, to the family of Late, Mr. Bamisile who was the Elekota of Kota-Omuo (The traditional leader of Kota-Omuo, now Kota-Ekiti).

== Education ==
Bamisile attended Mayflower School, Ikenne between 1973 and 1978, and later Government College, Eric Moore, Lagos between 1978 and 1983 where he had his West African Senior School Certificate Examination ordinary level and proceeded to the Federal College of Arts and Sciences in Lagos in 1984 for his advance level certificate.

He was a student of Political Science at the then University of Ife (now Obafemi Awolowo University (OAU); Bamisile left (OAU) after the death of his father in 1986 and relocated to the United Kingdom, where he was admitted to Eden College in London where he obtained a Diploma in Networking and Data Processing.

Bamisile was admitted to University of Ado-Ekiti now Ekiti State University Ado, to study Business Administration between 2008 and 2012. He later enrolled at the same Ekiti State University to earn his master's degree (MSc) and he is currently undergoing his Doctorate (PhD) in Public Sector Governance and Administration.

== Political career ==
Bamisile, a grassroots politician is familiar with the political atmosphere of Ekiti state. Bamisile redefined the revenue generation when he was the Special Adviser on Internally Generated Revenue to the chairman of Surulere Local Government, Lagos State, Hon. Hakeem Olaogun Dickson between 2001 and 2002.

In 2003, Niyi Adebayo appointed Bamisile as Liaison Officer of Ekiti House in Lagos; and in the same year (2003) he got involved in democratic process where he contested for the primary ticket of Ekiti State House of Assembly under the Platform of the Alliance for Democracy (AD) which he won.

In 2005, after the death of Hon. Abiodun; He contested as candidate of the National Conscience Party (NCP) for the House of Representatives against Hon. (Mrs) Abiodun Olujimi of the PDP. In 2006, he was appointed as the Ag. Chairman of Ekiti State Sports Commission, and later as Special Assistant (General Duties) to the Governor of Ekiti state.

He contested again for the membership of Ekiti State House of Assembly on April 14, 2007, which he won and eventually emerged the Speaker of the third parliament between 2007 and 2009.

He has Served on different political Strategic Committees which included among several others: Ekiti East Local Government Congress Committee (2003–2014), Ekiti State Gubernatorial Strategy Committee (2007), Ekiti State Transition Committee (2007), PDP National-Lagos State Congress Committee (2007), PDP National-Kwara State Congress Committee (2007), Ekiti State Appointments Committee (2007), Ad-Hoc Governors Strategic Committee (2007), Ekiti State Senatorial Congress Committee (2008), Ekiti State Congress Committee (2008), Ekiti State Local Government Chairmanship Candidates Screening Committee (2008), Ekiti State local Government Elections Committee (2008), Ekiti State Gubernatorial Re-run Elections Committee (2009), Ekiti State Commissioners Selection Committee (2009), Ekiti State Visitation Panel on Local Government activities (2009).

He left the People's Democratic Party (Nigeria) in 2014 before the Gubernatorial Election to support the then Governor Kayode Fayemi and General Muhammadu Buhari Presidential Ambition prior to the 2015 poll which he won.

He was among the candidates for the All Progressive Congress (APC) at the Ekiti State Gubernatorial election for 2018.

== Notes ==
A. The University of Ife is now called Obafemi Awolowo University

B. The University of Ado-Ekiti is now called Ekiti State University, Ado
