= List of governors of Ekiti State =

Governor of Ekiti State
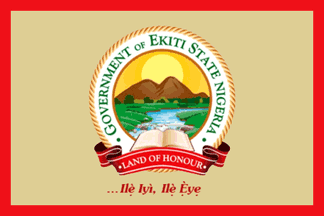
- Flag of Ekiti State
- Incumbent; Biodun Oyebanji since 16 October 2022
- Executive Branch of the Ekiti State Government
- Style: Governor (informal); His Excellency (courtesy)
- Type: Head of state; Head of government
- Member of: Ekiti State Executive Branch; Ekiti State Cabinet
- Residence: Ekiti State Government House
- Seat: Ado-Ekiti
- Appointer: Direct popular election or via succession from deputy governorship
- Term length: Four years renewable once
- Constituting instrument: Constitution of Nigeria
- Inaugural holder: Mohammed Bawa
- Formation: 1 October 1996 (29 years ago)
- Deputy: Deputy Governor of Ekiti State
- Website: ekitistate.gov.ng

The governor of Ekiti State is the head of government of Ekiti State in Nigeria. The governor is the head of the executive branch of the Ekiti State Government. The governor has a duty to enforce state laws and the power to either approve or veto bills passed by the Ekiti State House of Assembly, to convene the legislature and grant pardons.

When Ekiti State was created from Ondo State in 1996, Colonel Mohammed Bawa was appointed its first governor. Kayode Fayemi served the longest term as governor, serving for two non-consecutive terms of 4 years from 2010 to 2014, and from 2018 to 2022.

Since the creation of the state in 1996, 7 people have served as governor, 2 military governors and 5 civilian governors. Two people, Ayo Fayose and Kayode Fayemi served two non-consecutive terms in office. Excluding acting governors, Navy Captain Atanda Yusuf served the shortest term in office of 9 months.

The current governor is Biodun Oyebanji, he was sworn in on 16 October 2022.

== Governors ==
=== Military administrators (1996–1999) ===
Ekiti State was created on 1 October 1996 and General Sani Abacha appointed Mohammed Bawa as military administrator on 7 October 1996.

Administrator			Term of office			Party	Ref.
No.	Portrait	Name (birth–death)	Took office	Left office	Time in office	Party	Ref.
1		Colonel; Mohammed Bawa (1954–2017)	7 October 1996	7 August 1998	1 year, 10 months	Military	
2		Navy Captain; Atanda Yusuf	7 August 1998	29 May 1999	9 months	Military	

=== Fourth Republic (1999–present) ===
Under the 1999 Constitution of the Federal Republic of Nigeria, the governor is both head of state and government. The governor is elected for a four-year term. In the event of a vacancy, the deputy governor would serve as acting governor.

Governor			Term of office			Political party	Elected	Ref.
No.	Portrait	Name (birth–death)	Took office	Left office	Time in office	Political party	Elected	Ref.
3		Otunba Niyi Adebayo (born 1958)	29 May 1999	29 May 2003	4 years	Alliance for Democracy	1999	
4		Ayo Fayose (born 1960)	29 May 2003	16 October 2006	3 years, 140 days	Peoples Democratic Party	2003	
–		Chief Friday Aderemi	16 October 2006	19 October 2006	3 days	Peoples Democratic Party		
–		Brigadier General Tunji Olurin (1944–2021)	19 October 2006	27 April 2007	190 days	Peoples Democratic Party		
–		Tope Ademiluyi (born 1965)	27 April 2007	29 May 2007	32 days	Peoples Democratic Party		
5		Olusegun Oni (born 1954)	29 May 2007	17 February 2009	1 year, 264 days	Peoples Democratic Party	2007	
–		Tunji Odeyemi	17 February 2009	6 May 2009	78 days	Peoples Democratic Party		
5		Olusegun Oni (born 1954)	6 May 2009	15 October 2010	1 year, 162 days	Peoples Democratic Party	2009	
6		Kayode Fayemi (born 1965)	16 October 2010	16 October 2014	4 years	Action Congress of Nigeria		
7		Ayo Fayose (born 1960)	16 October 2014	16 October 2018	4 years	Peoples Democratic Party	2014	
8		Kayode Fayemi (born 1965)	16 October 2018	16 October 2022	4 years	All Progressives Congress	2018	
9		Biodun Oyebanji (born 1967)	16 October 2022	Incumbent	3 years, 326 days	All Progressives Congress	2022	

== See also ==
- States of Nigeria
- List of Nigerian state governors
