= Abasi Ogwime Braimah =

Nigerian politician

Member of the House of Representatives of Nigeria
- In office 5 June 2007 – 6 June 2011
- Constituency: Etsako Federal Constituency, Edo State

Personal details
- Born: September 29, 1969
- Party: Peoples Democratic Party (PDP)
- Other political affiliations: All Progressives Congress (APC)
- Occupation: Politician

Abasi Ogwime Braimah (born 29 September 1969) is a Nigerian politician who served as a member of the House of Representatives of Nigeria in the 6th National Assembly (2007–2011), representing the Etsako federal constituency in Edo State. He was elected on the platform of the Peoples Democratic Party (PDP).

== Early life and background ==
Abasi Ogwime Braimah was born on 29 September 1969. He has a Bachelor's Degree in Chemical Engineering before he entered elective politics.

== Political career ==
Braimah entered national-level elective politics in the 2007 general elections. He was elected to the House of Representatives for the 6th National Assembly, serving from 5 June 2007 to 6 June 2011 and representing the Etsako (Etsako East/West/Central) federal constituency of Edo State. During his term he was a member of the Peoples Democratic Party (PDP). Braimah was involved in post-election court cases following the 2007 elections, as his name appeared in appeal records challenging some of the results. Braimah has also been associated with the All Progressives Congress (APC), after serving as Chief of Staff to the former National Chairman of the APC, Otunba Niyi Adebayo in 2018, involving in federal contract awards and stakeholder activity in APC politics.
