= List of current state governors in Nigeria =

Party affiliation of current Nigerian state governors: APC (31 states) APM (2 states) Accord (1 state) APGA (1 state) Labour (1 state)

Nigeria has 36 states that each elect a governor to serve as chief executive of the state government. The sole federal district, the Federal Capital Territory, is headed by a minister appointed by the president to oversee the administration. In the event of a vacancy, the governor is succeeded by the second-highest-ranking state official; the deputy governor.

As of 14 May 2026, there are 31 states with APC governors, 2 states with APM governors and 1 state each with Accord, APGA, and Labour governors.

The current gubernatorial term ends and new term begins in May for most states, two to three months after their election. Governors are elected for a term of four years (maximum of two terms).

All 36 governors are members of the Nigeria Governors' Forum, a non-partisan organization which represents states in discussions with the federal government. Other organizations for governors include the partisan Progressive Governors Forum and PDP Governors Forum.

== State governors ==
Citizen of Nigeria by birth, at least 35 years of age, is a member of a political party and is sponsored by that political party are eligible for the office of Governor. The constitution limits state governors to only two four-year terms in office.

| State | Governor | Deputy Governor | Party | Took office | Term End | Past Leaders |
|---|---|---|---|---|---|---|
| Abia State | Alex Otti | Ikechukwu Emetu | LP | 2023 | 2027 | List |
| Adamawa State | Ahmadu Umaru Fintiri | Kaletapwa Farauta | APC | 2019 | 2027 | List |
| Akwa Ibom State | Umo Eno | Akon Eyakenyi | APC | 2023 | 2027 | List |
| Anambra State | Charles Soludo | Onyeka Ibezim | APGA | 2022 | 2026 | List |
| Bauchi State | Bala Muhammed | Auwal Jatau | APM | 2019 | 2027 | List |
| Bayelsa State | Douye Diri | Peter Akpe | APC | 2020 (Note: David Lyon of the APC was originally elected Governor; however, a February 2020 Supreme Court judgement disqualified Lyon and awarded the win to the PDP's Douye Diri.) | 2028 | List |
| Benue State | Hyacinth Alia | Samuel Ode | APC | 2023 | 2027 | List |
| Borno State | Babagana Zulum | Umar Usman Kadafur | APC | 2019 | 2027 | List |
| Cross River State | Bassey Otu | Peter Odey | APC | 2023 | 2027 | List |
| Delta State | Sheriff Oborevwori | Monday Onyeme | APC | 2023 | 2027 | List |
| Ebonyi State | Francis Nwifuru | Patricia Obila | APC | 2023 | 2027 | List |
| Edo State | Monday Okpebholo | Dennis Idahosa | APC | 2024 | 2028 | List |
| Ekiti State | Biodun Oyebanji | Monisade Afuye | APC | 2022 | 2026 | List |
| Enugu State | Peter Mbah | Ifeanyi Ossai | APC | 2023 | 2027 | List |
| Gombe State | Muhammad Inuwa Yahaya | Manasseh Daniel Jatau | APC | 2019 | 2027 | List |
| Imo State | Hope Uzodinma | Chinyere Ekomaru | APC | 2020 (Note: Emeka Ihedioha of the PDP was originally elected Governor; however, a January 2020 Supreme Court judgement awarded the win to the APC's Hope Uzodinma after Ihedioha had governed for over seven months.) | 2028 | List |
| Jigawa State | Umar Namadi | Aminu Usman | APC | 2023 | 2027 | List |
| Kaduna State | Uba Sani | Hadiza Balarabe | APC | 2023 | 2027 | List |
| Kano State | Abba Kabir Yusuf | Aminu Abdussalam Gwarzo | APC | 2023 | 2027 | List |
| Katsina State | Dikko Umaru Radda | Faruk Lawal Jobe | APC | 2023 | 2027 | List |
| Kebbi State | Nasir Idris | Abubakar Umar Argungu | APC | 2023 | 2027 | List |
| Kogi State | Ahmed Usman Ododo | Salifu Joel | APC | 2024 | 2028 | List |
| Kwara State | AbdulRahman AbdulRazaq | Kayode Alabi | APC | 2019 | 2027 | List |
| Lagos State | Babajide Sanwo-Olu | Femi Hamzat | APC | 2019 | 2027 | List |
| Nasarawa State | Abdullahi Sule | Emmanuel Akabe | APC | 2019 | 2027 | List |
| Niger State | Mohammed Umar Bago | Yakubu Garba | APC | 2023 | 2027 | List |
| Ogun State | Dapo Abiodun | Noimot Salako-Oyedele | APC | 2019 | 2027 | List |
| Ondo State | Lucky Aiyedatiwa | Olayide Adelami | APC | 2023 (Note: Lucky Aiyedatiwa became Governor on 27 December 2023, following the death of Governor Rotimi Akeredolu.) | 2029 | List |
| Osun State | Ademola Adeleke | Kola Adewusi | A | 2022 | 2026 | List |
| Oyo State | Seyi Makinde | Bayo Lawal | APM | 2019 | 2027 | List |
| Plateau State | Caleb Mutfwang | Josephine Piyo | APC | 2023 | 2027 | List |
| Rivers State | Siminalayi Fubara | Ngozi Odu | APC | 2023 | 2027 | List |
| Sokoto State | Ahmad Aliyu | Idris Muhammad Gobir | APC | 2023 | 2027 | List |
| Taraba State | Agbu Kefas | Aminu Abdullahi Alkali | APC | 2023 | 2027 | List |
| Yobe State | Mai Mala Buni | Idi Barde Gubana | APC | 2019 | 2027 | List |
| Zamfara State | Dauda Lawal | Mani Mallam Mummuni | APC | 2023 | 2027 | List |
| Territory | Minister | Minister of State | Party | Took office | Term End | Past leaders |
| Federal Capital Territory | Nyesom Wike | Mariya Mahmoud Bunkure | APC | 2023 | 2027 | List |

== See also ==
- States in Nigeria
- List of governors of former Nigerian states
- Nigeria Governors' Forum
- Progressive Governors Forum
- PDP Governors Forum
