= Funmilayo =

Funmilayo is a given name. Notable people with the name include:

- Funmilayo Olayinka (1960–2013), Nigerian banker and politician
- Funmilayo Ransome-Kuti (1900–1978), Nigerian educator, suffragist, and women's rights activist
