= 2014 Ekiti State gubernatorial election =

2014 gubernatorial election in Ekiti State, Nigeria

- 21 June 2014
Nominee	Ayo Fayose	Kayode Fayemi
Party	PDP	APC
Running mate	Kolapo Olushola
Popular vote	203,090	120,433
Governor before election
Kayode Fayemi
APC
Elected Governor
Ayo Fayose
PDP

The 2014 Ekiti State gubernatorial election occurred in Nigeria on 21 June 2014, the PDP nominee Ayo Fayose won election, defeating Kayode Fayemi of the APC.

Ayo Fayose emerged PDP gubernatorial candidate after scoring 462 votes and defeating his closest rival, Caleb Olubolade, who received 7 votes, Dayo Adeyeye came third with 3 votes and Modupe Ogundipe had 1 vote. He picked Kolapo Olushola as his running mate. Kayode Fayemi was the APC candidate. 14 candidates contested in the election.

== Electoral system ==
The Governor of Ekiti State is elected using the plurality voting system.

== Primary election ==
=== PDP primary ===
The PDP primary election was held on 22 March 2014. Ayo Fayose won the primary election polling 462 votes against 3 other candidates. His closest rival, Caleb Olubolade, had 7 votes, Dayo Adeyeye came third with 3 votes and Modupe Ogundipe received 1 vote.

=== APC primary ===
The APC primary election was held on 13 April 2014. Kayode Fayemi won the primary election polling 192,767 votes against other candidates who participated.

== Results ==
A total number of 14 candidates registered with the Independent National Electoral Commission to contest in the election.

Candidate	Party	Votes	%
Ayo Fayose	People's Democratic Party	203,090	58.58
Kayode Fayemi	All Progressives Congress	120,433	34.74
Bamidele Michael Opeyemi	Labour Party	18,135	5.23
Progressive Peoples Alliance	1,050	0.30	
Convention People's Party	967	0.28	
People For Democratic Change	921	0.27	
Alliance for Democracy	843	0.24	
National Conscience Party	322	0.09	
Accord	268	0.08	
KOWA Party	222	0.06	
Action Alliance	146	0.04	
MPPP	137	0.04	
United Democratic Party	67	0.02	
Social Democratic Party	65	0.02	
Total		346,666	100.00
Source: Vanguard
