= Olushola =

- Gender: Male
- Language: Yoruba

Origin
- Origin: Nigeria
- Meaning: The prominent one creates wealth.
- Region of origin: South West, Nigeria

Olushola is a Nigerian male given name of Yoruba origin. It means "The prominent one creates wealth". Notable individuals with the name include:

- Olusola Saraki (17 May 1933 – 14 November 2012), a Nigerian politician.
- Nicky Ajose (born 7 October 1991), a professional footballer.
- Kolapo Olushola, a Nigerian academic and politician.
