= PDP Governors Forum =

Political organisation

- Abbreviation: PDPGF
- Formation: 23 February 2013; 13 years ago
- Founder: Goodluck Jonathan
- Type: Political
- Region served: Nigeria
- Chairman: Seyi Makinde
- Parent organization: People's Democratic Party

The PDP Governors Forum or PDPGF is a political and policy think tank consisting of the state governors affiliated with the People's Democratic Party in Nigeria. The Forum was formed on 24 February 2013 when it split away from the Nigeria Governors Forum (NGF). The PDPGF aims to provide a platform for governors to interact and exchange knowledge, ideas and experiences about how to move the party forward as well as to better coordinate programmes and policies in their various states. The sole member of the forum is Seyi Makinde following the defection of Bala Mohammed to Allied Peoples Movement on 2 May 2026.

== List of current PDP governors ==
There is currently 1 PDP state governor:

Governor	State	Elected/Took office
Seyi Makinde	Oyo State	2019

== List of PDPGF chairs ==
Since the organization's inception in 2013, the positions of chair and deputy chair have been chosen by the Forum members from among their number. The following is a list of current and former PDPGF chairs.

Chair	State	Tenure
Governor Godswill Akpabio	Akwa Ibom State	25 February 2013 – 29 May 2015
Governor Olusegun Mimiko	Ondo State	17 June 2015 – 20 January 2017
Governor Ayodele Fayose	Ekiti State	20 January 2017 – 16 October 2018
Governor Ibrahim Hassan Dankwambo	Gombe State	23 October 2018 – 23 May 2019
Governor Seriake Dickson	Bayelsa State	23 May 2019 – 27 January 2020
Governor Aminu Waziri Tambuwal	Sokoto State	27 January 2020 – 29 May 2023
Governor Bala Mohammed	Bauchi State	3 June 2023 – 2 May 2026

== See also ==
- National Working Committee
- Rivers State People's Democratic Party
