= 2009 Ekiti State gubernatorial by-election =

2009 gubernatorial election in Ekiti State, Nigeria

2009 Ekiti State gubernatorial election
- 25 April & 5 May 2009
Nominee	Segun Oni	Kayode Fayemi
Party	PDP	AC
Running mate	Sikiru Tae Lawal
Popular vote	111,140	107,011
Governor before election
Segun Oni
PDP
Elected Governor
Segun Oni
PDP

The 2009 Ekiti State gubernatorial election was held on 25 April 2009. It was, however, not until 5 May 2009, that the exercise was concluded due to electoral violence. Incumbent PDP Governor Segun Oni won re-election in the supplementary election, defeating AC Kayode Fayemi candidate to emerge winner.

Segun Oni emerged winner in the PDP gubernatorial primary election. His running mate was Sikiru Tae Lawal.

== Electoral system ==
The Governor of Ekiti State is elected using the plurality voting system.

== Results ==
The two main contenders registered with the Independent National Electoral Commission to contest in the re-run election were PDP Governor Segun Oni, who won the contest, and ACN's Kayode Fayemi, who follows closely. The election results were later legally contested by the Fayemi in the court.

Candidate	Party	Votes	%
Segun Oni	People's Democratic Party (PDP)	111,140	50.95
Kayode Fayemi	Action Congress of Nigeria (ACN)	107,011	49.05
Others			
Total		218,151	100.00
Source: Vanguard Nigeria
