= Tope Ademiluyi =

Nigerian politician (born 1965)

Acting Governor of Ekiti State
- In office 27 April 2007 – 29 May 2007
- Preceded by: Tunji Olurin
- Succeeded by: Olusegun Oni

Personal details
- Born: Adetope Ademiluyi; 23 August 1965 (age 60)
- Party: All Progressives Congress
- Other political affiliations: Peoples Democratic Party
- Occupation: Politician

Adetope Ademiluyi (born 23 August 1965) is a Nigerian politician and former acting governor of Ekiti State.

== Background and political affiliation ==
Adetope Ademiluyi is from Aramoko-Ekiti in Ekiti West Local Government Area of Ekiti State. He was a member of the Peoples Democratic Party during his time as acting governor of Ekiti State. In 2016, he was among members of the party in Ekiti State reported to be considering a move to the All Progressives Congress.

== Political career ==
He assumed the position of acting governor in Ekiti State on 27 April 2007, and succeeded Tunji Olurin, the previous acting governor. Ademiluyi held that position until 29 May 2007, when Olusegun Oni took office. Adetope Ademiluyi, formerly of the People's Democratic Party (PDP), is now a member of the All Progressives Congress (APC) Party.

== Political activities after leaving office ==
After his tenure as acting governor, Ademiluyi continued to participate in political activities in Ekiti State. In 2016, he was listed among senior members of the Peoples Democratic Party who were preparing to join the All Progressives Congress. In 2018, he attended a political event in Aramoko-Ekiti as a former acting governor, where discussions focused on the future of Ekiti State ahead of the 2018 governorship election. In 2021, he also participated in a public discussion in Ekiti State concerning constitutional and political issues.
