= Feyisetan Fayose =

Philanthropist and human right activist

- Born: 8 January 1964 (age 62); Nigeria
- Occupation: Activist
- Spouse: Ayo Fayose

Feyisetan Fayose is a Nigerian philanthropist, human rights activist, and former first lady of Ekiti State as the wife of Ayo Fayose.

Feyisetan Fayose was born 8 January 1964. She is also the grand patron of Ekiti state chapter of National Union of Female Journalists.

She has also advocated against child marriage and have called on the government to ensure the protection of human rights, she has also advised young people to desist from pre-marital and unprotected sex as to prevent HIV/AIDS.
