= Bisi Egbeyemi =

Nigerian politician (1944–2023)

Otunba Bisi Egbeyemi

Deputy Governor of Ekiti State
- In office 16 October 2018 – 16 October 2022
- Governor: Kayode Fayemi
- Preceded by: Kolapo Olushola
- Succeeded by: Monisade Afuye

Personal details
- Born: 8 May 1944 Ado-Ekiti, Southern Region, British Nigeria (now in Ekiti State, Nigeria)
- Died: 18 March 2023 (aged 78) Ado Ekiti, Nigeria
- Party: All Progressives Congress
- Education: Obafemi Awolowo University
- Occupation: Politician; lawyer

Otunba Bisi Egbeyemi (8 May 1944 – 18 March 2023) was a Nigerian lawyer and politician who served as deputy governor of Ekiti State from 2018 to 2022.

== Education ==
Bisi Egbeyemi attended St. Saviour's Primary School, Ado-Ekiti and Holy Trinity Anglican School Ilawe-Ekiti (1958) and Baptist School, Ado-Ekiti (1959). He later attended Harding Memorial Secondary Modern School where he obtained his Modern School Certificate in 1962.

Egbeyemi studied privately while a laboratory assistant at Ekiti Parapo College, Ido-Ekiti, 1965, and when he was a bursar at Notre Dame Grammar School Usi-Ekiti from 1969 to 1972 during which he passed his West Africa School Certificate Examination as a private student and both G.C.E. 'O'Level and Advanced Level Examinations. He later attended the University of Lagos College of Education where he read Biology and Physical Education and passed with Distinction in Physical Education. He read law at the University of Ife (Now Obafemi Awolowo University) from 1977 to 1980 and was at the Nigerian Law School Victoria Island, Lagos between 1980 and 1981 where he obtained his Barrister at Law Certificate and was called to the Bar in 1981 as a Solicitor and Advocate of the Supreme Court of Nigeria.

== Career ==
Early in his career as a leader, Bisi Egbeyemi was President of the Law Students Association, University of Ife in 1978–1979 session. He was appointed the Commissioner for Justice and Attorney General in Ekiti State (2002–2003) and was President of the Physical Education Students Association of the University of Lagos College of Education, Akoka Lagos (1974–1975). He was the Director of Owena Motels in Ondo State and the Director of Odua Investment Company Limited between 2010 and 2014. He contested alongside Governor Kayode Fayemi in the Ekiti Governor election in 2017 under the All Progressive Congress and they won the election. The decision of Kayode Fayemi to name him as his Deputy was met with criticism as many thought he lobbied for it. He however stated that his party chose him because they feel if his name is mentioned in Ado Ekiti and in Ekiti as a whole that people will support him. On 17 July 2020, he debunked an impeachment rumor after some news agency reported that he was going to be impeached by the Governor. He described the rumor as tissues of lies and wicked falsehood against innocent people.

== Deputy Governor of Ekiti State ==
Kayode Fayemi picked Bisi Egbeyemi as his running mate for the 2018 Ekiti State governorship election under the APC and on Sunday, 15 July 2018, Kayode Fayemi and Bisi Egbeyemi were declared the winner of the Ekiti State Governorship election. They recorded 197,459 votes to win the PDP who got 178,121. He was sworn in as the deputy governor of Ekiti State on 16 October 2018 in Ado-Ekiti, the Ekiti State Capital.
