= Temitope Aluko =

Nigerian politician

Temitope "Tope" Aluko is a Nigerian politician, academic and former secretary of the Ekiti State chapter of the Peoples Democratic Party. He was chairman, Security and Intelligence Committee of Ayodele Fayose Campaign Organisation for the 21 June 2014 gubernatorial election in which Ayodele Fayose emerged as winner in all the sixteen local government in the state.

== Election malpractice ==
On 31 January 2015, in a television interview on Channels TV, he disclosed how the June 2014 Ekiti State gubernatorial election was rigged and claimed to be involved in the election malpractice. He said that military personnel and machinery were used to rig the election. He stated that Goodluck Jonathan, former President of Nigeria, gave a sum of $37m in cash to manipulate the election. He said that the former president gave the sum of $2m to Fayose in March 2015 for the primary election. He said the money was received from the treasury of the Nigerian National Petroleum Corporation. The money was transferred to Abuja before it was finally moved to Ekiti State.

The confession resulted in criticism that Aluko should have raised an alarm before Fayose was confirmed as the executive governor of Ekiti State.

=== Arrest ===
On 3 February 2016, the Chief Magistrate, Soji Adegboye of the Ado Ekiti Magistrate Court, ordered the immediate arrest of Aluko for perjury on a motion Ex parte number MAD/10 cm/2016, filed by the Ekiti State Government against Aluko and the State Commissioner of Police. The motion was made pursuant to Section 117 of the Criminal Code Law, Cap C16, law of Ekiti State 2012, Section 79 of the Ekiti State Administration of Criminal Justice Law 2014 and Section 23 (D) of the Magistrates’ Courts Law 2014.
