= 2007 Ekiti State gubernatorial election =

State election in Nigeria

- 14 April 2007
Nominee	Olusegun Oni	Kayode Fayemi
Party	PDP	ACN
Popular vote	177,689	108,305
Governor before election
Tope Ademiluyi
PDP
Elected Governor
Olusegun Oni
PDP

The 2007 Ekiti State gubernatorial election was the 3rd gubernatorial election of Ekiti State. Held on 14 April 2007, the People's Democratic Party nominee Olusegun Oni won the election, defeating Kayode Fayemi of the Action Congress of Nigeria.

== Results ==
Olusegun Oni from the People's Democratic Party won the election, defeating Kayode Fayemi from the Action Congress of Nigeria. Registered voters was 771,228.

2007 Ekiti State gubernatorial election
Party	Candidate	Votes	%	±%
PDP	Olusegun Oni	177,689	0	
ACN	Kayode Fayemi	108,305	0	
PDP hold				
