= Our People's FM =

- Fajuyi, Ado-Ekiti, Ekiti State; Nigeria
- Frequency: 104.1 MHz

Links
- Website: ourpeoplesfm1041.com.ng

Our People's FM (104.1 MHz) is a Nigerian radio station located in Fajuyi area in Ado-Ekiti, Ekiti State.

== History ==
On 14 February 2019, state counterterrorism police swarmed the station and forcibly shut it down for a time. The given reason for the shutdown was that the building in which the station was housed violated municipal land development regulations for not having an approved plan for the transmission tower. However, it was alleged that the closure had a political dimension, as the station was claimed to be owned by former governor Ayodele Fayose, who claimed the closure was a prelude to rigging of internal elections in the All Progressives Congress party. The building and other Fayose-owned properties had previously been sealed by the Economic and Financial Crimes Commission.
