= Executive Council of Kebbi State =

Executive arm of a state government in Nigeria's Kebbi State

The Kebbi State Executive Council (also known as the Cabinet of Kebbi State) is the highest formal governmental body that plays important roles in the Government of Kebbi State headed by the Governor of Kebbi State. It consists of the Deputy Governor, Secretary to the State Government, Chief of Staff, Commissioners who preside over ministerial departments, and the Governor's special aides.

== Functions ==
The Executive Council exists to advise and direct the Governor. Their appointment as members of the Executive Council gives them the authority to execute power over their fields.

== Current cabinet ==
The current Executive Council is serving under the Abubakar Atiku Bagudu administration.

Office	Incumbent
Governor	Dr. Nasiru Idris
Deputy Governor	Abubakar Tafida
Secretary to the State Government	
Head of Service	
Commissioner for Animal Health	
Commissioner for Basic and Secondary Education	
Commissioner for Budget and Economic Development	
Commissioner for Finance	
Commissioner for Health	
Commissioner for Information and Culture	
Commissioner for Works and Transport	
Commissioner for Information and Culture Commissioner for Information and Communication Technology	
Commissioner for Environment	
