= 2003 Ekiti State gubernatorial election =

2003 gubernatorial election in Ekiti State, Nigeria

- (Nigeria)
- April 19, 2003
Nominee	Ayo Fayose	Niyi Adebayo
Party	PDP	AD
Running mate	Abiodun Aluko
Popular vote	219,906	168,391
Governor before election
Niyi Adebayo
AD
Elected Governor
Ayo Fayose
PDP

The 2003 Ekiti State gubernatorial election occurred on April 19, 2003. PDP's Ayo Fayose won election for a first tenure, defeating Incumbent Governor, AD's Niyi Adebayo and three other candidates.

Ayo Fayose emerged winner in the PDP gubernatorial primary election. His running mate was Abiodun Aluko.

== Electoral system ==
The Governor of Ekiti State is elected using the plurality voting system.

== Results ==
A total of five candidates registered with the Independent National Electoral Commission to contest in the election. PDP candidate Ayo Fayose won election for a first tenure, defeating AD Incumbent Governor, Niyi Adebayo, and three other candidates.

The total number of registered voters in the state was 981,753. However, only 43.47% (i.e. 426,731) of registered voters participated in the exercise.

Candidate	Party	Votes	%
Ayo Fayose	People's Democratic Party (PDP)	219,906	56.63
Niyi Adebayo	Alliance for Democracy (AD)	168,391	43.37
Reuben Famuyibo	All Nigeria Peoples Party (ANPP)		
United Nigeria People's Party (UNPP)			
Femi Falana	National Conscience Party (NCP)		
Total		388,297	100.00
Registered voters/turnout		981,753	–
Source: Gamji, Africa Update, Dawodu
