= Executive Council of Ekiti State =

Executive government body of Nigeria's Ekiti State

The Ekiti State Executive Council (informally, the Cabinet of Ekiti State) is the highest formal governmental body of Ekiti State, Nigeria. It is headed by the Governor of Ekiti State. It consists of the Deputy Governor of Ekiti State, Secretary to the State Government, Chief of Staff, Commissioners who preside over ministerial departments, and the Governor's special aides.

== Functions ==
The Executive Council exists to advise and direct the Governor. Their appointment as members of the Executive Council gives them the authority to execute power over their fields.

== Current cabinet ==
The current Executive Council is serving under the Biodun Oyebanji administration.

Office	Incumbent
Governor	Biodun Oyebanji
Deputy Governor	Monisade Afuye
Secretary to the State Government	Dr. Habibat ADUBIARO
Chief of Staff	Oyeniyi ADEBAYO
Head of Service	Dr. Folake OLOMOJOBI
Attorney-General and Commissioner for Justice	Dayo APATA, SAN
Commissioner for Agriculture and Food Security	Ebenezer BOLUWADE
Commissioner for Arts, Culture & Tourism	Prof. Ojo BAKARE
Commissioner for Budget & Economic Planning	Femi AJAYI
Commissioner for Education, Science, and Technology	Dr. Kofoworola ADERIYE
Commissioner for Environment & Natural Resources	Chief Tosin ALUKO
Commissioner for Finance and Economic Development	Akintunde OYEBODE
Commissioner for Health & Human Services	Dr. Oyebanji FILANI
Commissioner for Information & Values Orientation	
Commissioner for Infrastructural and Public Utilities	
Commissioner for Investment, Trade & Industries	Omotayo ADEOLA
Commissioner for Lands, Housing & Urban Development	
Commissioner for Local Government & Community Development	
Commissioner for Special Duties & Regional Integration	
Commissioner for Works & Transportation	
Commissioner for Youth & Sports Development	
Special Adviser for Investment, Trade and Industry	
Special Adviser and Director General of the Bureau of Public Procurement	
Special Adviser for Agriculture and Food Security	
Special Adviser for Governance, Reforms and Innovations	Oluwaseun FAKUADE
Special Adviser and Director General for Lands and Urban Development	
Special Adviser for Infrastructure and Public Utilities	Prof. Mobolaji ALUKO
Special Adviser for Budget, Economic Planning and Performance	
Special Adviser and Director General of the Bureau of Special Projects	Tope OGUNLEYE
Special Adviser and Director General of the Office of Transformation, Strategy & Delivery	
Special Adviser for Political Matters	Chief Olajide AWE
Special Adviser for Development Partnerships/SDGs	
Special Adviser for Media and Strategy/Chief Press Secretary	Yinka OYEBODE
