= Mohammed Bawa =

Nigerian military governor (1954–2017)

Colonel Mohammed Inua Bawa

Military Governor of Gombe State
- In office August 1998 – 29 May 1999
- Preceded by: Joseph Orji
- Succeeded by: Abubakar Habu Hashidu

Military Governor of Ekiti State
- In office 7 October 1996 – August 1998
- Succeeded by: Atanda Yusuf

Personal details
- Born: 6 April 1954 Yauri, Northern Region, Nigeria
- Died: 26 May 2017 (aged 63) Jos, Plateau State, Nigeria
- Education: Ahmadu Bello University; University of Madras

Military service
- Allegiance: Nigeria
- Branch: Nigerian Army
- Rank: Colonel

Mohammed Inua Bawa (6 April 1954 – 26 May 2017) was appointed the Administrator of Ekiti State, Nigeria during the military regime of General Sani Abacha. He was then appointed Administrator of Gombe State from August 1998 to May 1999, handing over to the elected civilian governor at the start of the Nigerian Fourth Republic.

== Background ==
Bawa was born on 6 April 1954 in Yauri, Kebbi State. He studied at Government Colleges in Keffi and Bida, then attended the Ahmadu Bello University, Zaria after which he studied at the University of Madras, India. Joining the army, he was commissioned as second lieutenant in 1976, full lieutenant in 1980, captain in 1985 and major in 1990.

== Career ==
Bawa was appointed the Administrator of Ekiti State after it was formed in October 1996 from part of Ondo State. After the death of General Sani Abacha, his successor General Abdulsalami Abubakar transferred him to Gombe State during the transition to democracy that was completed in May 1999. As administrator of Gombe State, he initiated joint border patrols with neighboring Chad and Niger to reduce cross border banditry.

He ran unsuccessfully as candidate for Governor of Kebbi State on the Action Congress (AC) platform in the April 2007 elections. Bawa died in hospital in Jos, Nigeria on 26 May 2017 due to complications from surgery. He was 63.
