= Anambra State All Progressives Congress =

State chapter of Nigerian political party

Anambra State All Progressive Congress
- Chairperson: Emeka Ibe
- Spokesperson: Okelo Madukaife
- Headquarters: Glass House Awka, Anambra State
- Ideology: Big tent, Federalism, Social conservatism
- National affiliation: All Progressive Congress

The Anambra State All Progressive Congress is the state chapter of the All Progressive Congress Nigeria in Anambra State, Nigeria. It is currently chaired by Emeka Ibe. Its publicity secretary is Okelo Madukaife. Prominent public figures include Nigeria's Minister of Labour and Employment, Dr. Chris Ngige, and Executive Secretary of the Pension Transitional Arrangement Directorate (PTAD), Barr. Sharon Ikeazor.
