= Executive Council of Nasarawa State =

Executive arm of a state government in Nigeria

The Nasarawa State Executive Council (also known as the Cabinet of Nasarawa State) is the highest formal governmental body that plays important roles in the Government of Nasarawa State headed by the Governor of Nasarawa State. It consists of the Deputy Governor, Secretary to the State Government, Chief of Staff, Commissioners who preside over ministerial departments, and (with the consent of the legislative arm of the government) the Governor's special aides.

== Functions ==
The Executive Council exists to advise and direct the Governor. Their appointment as members of the Executive Council gives them the authority to execute power over their fields.

== Current cabinet ==
The Executive Council was serving under the administration of Governor Abdullahi Sule until it was dissolved by Sule in August 2021, dismissing all appointees.

Office	Incumbent
Governor	Abdullahi Sule
Deputy Governor	Emmanuel Akabe
