= Garba Shehu =

Nigerian journalist and politician

- Born: 27 November 1959 (age 66); Dutse Jigawa, State.
- Education: Barewa College; Bayero University
- Occupation: Journalist
- Known for: Journalism
- Title: Mallam
- Political party: All Progressive Congress

Mallam Garba Shehu (born 12 December 1959) is a Nigerian journalist and politician who served as the Senior Special Assistant, Media and Publicity to former president of Nigeria Muhammadu Buhari. He was the president of Nigerian Guild of Editors and spokesperson of the former vice president of Nigeria, Atiku Abubakar.

== Background ==
Shehu was born in Dutse, Jigawa State, where he grew up with his parents.

== Education ==
Shehu attended Dutse primary school in 1970. He furthered his education at Barewa College in 1975. In 1981, he obtained a bachelor's degree from Bayero University Kano.

== Career ==
Shehu started his career as a correspondent at Nigerian Television Authority, Sokoto, in 1982. He was then an energy correspondent at Network News Lagos in 1984. He became the managing director (MD) of the Triumph, then President of the Guild of Editors.

Former vice president of Nigeria Alhaji Atiku Abubakar appointed him Special Assistant on Media in 2003. Shehu was removed six months later by former president Olusegun Obasanjo, who was empowered by the constitution to appoint and relieve political aides for the vice president. He continued working at the Atiku Media Office (AMO), the media organ of the then-vice president's political movement, after his sack.

In 2015, he was appointed the director of Media and Publicity of the All Progressive Congress for the presidential campaign council. He was appointed as Senior Special Assistant, Media and Publicity by president Muhammadu Buhari and was reappointed after the president won reelection. He currently writes as a columnist in the Nigerian Premium Times.

== Controversy ==
In November 2020, Boko Haram members killed 66 people, mostly farmers and fishermen at Koshobe village near Zabarmari, Jere Local Government Area of Borno State. Shehu was criticized after his interview with BBC where he said the victims did not receive military clearance to farm.

In December 2020, about 333 students were abducted in the town of Kankara, in Katsina state. Shehu came under heavy criticism when he said only 10 students were abducted contrary to the state government and media claims. He would later apologize for misleading the public.

On 23 December 2020, a former presidential spokesperson, Reno Omokri, challenged Garba Shehu, after his claim that President Muhammadu Buhari has made Nigeria safer that it was, to spend a night without security in Koshobe, or Kware, verified by an independent journalist. Reno promised a reward of $20,000. Shehu responded by saying, "If this is the money from the collections made in the name of Leah Sharibu, the unfortunate Christian girl stolen by Boko Haram, I won’t touch it with a long. Please keep 'your USD20000'". He was criticized by some Nigerians who believed his description of Leah Sharibu as "unfortunate Christian girl" was insensitive.
