= Funmilayo Olayinka =

Nigerian politician (1960–2013)

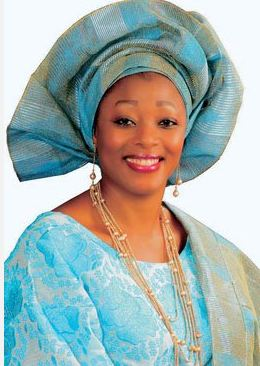

Deputy Governor of Ekiti State
- In office 16 October 2010 – 6 April 2013
- Governor: Kayode Fayemi
- Preceded by: Sikiru Tae Lawal
- Succeeded by: Modupe Adelabu

Personal details
- Born: Olufunmilayo Adunni Famuagun; 20 June 1960 Ado-Ekiti, Western Region, British Nigeria (now in Ekiti State, Nigeria)
- Died: 6 April 2013 (aged 52) Lagos, Nigeria
- Resting place: Ado-Ekiti, Ekiti State, Nigeria
- Party: Action Congress of Nigeria
- Education: Central State University
- Occupation: Politician; banker

Olufunmilayo Adunni Olayinka (née Famuagun; 20 June 1960 – 6 April 2013), was a Nigerian banker and politician who served as the deputy governor of Ekiti State from 2010 until her death in 2013.

== Early life and education ==
Olayinka was born in Ado-Ekiti, Ekiti State. She attended Holy Trinity Grammar School Ibadan, where she obtained her first school leaving certificate with distinction. She subsequently proceeded to Olivet Baptist High School, Oyo State, Nigeria, where she obtained her Higher School Certificate (HSC). She held a master's degree in public administration and a Bachelor of Business Administration marketing from Central State University, Wilberforce, Ohio, United States, in 1981 and 1983 respectively. She was three times winner of the Dean's Honour roll.

== Career ==
Olayinka, a marketing analyst and strategist, started her career in banking with First Bank of Nigeria Plc in 1986. She later worked as relationship manager for corporate accounts in Access Bank, the now defunct Merchant Banking Corporation [MBC] and United Bank for Africa Plc.

In August 2002, she started working in corporate communications and proceeded to head the Corporate Affairs Division, United Bank for Africa. She later became head of brand management and corporate affairs, thereby leading the team responsible for delivering a compelling brand proposition and re-branding of the United Bank for Africa which helped to drive the bank's business strategy and added value to the total image of the brand.

Olayinka was also the second vice president of the Association of Corporate Managers of Banks between 2002 and 2004.

Olayinka played a strategic role during the merger process of the erstwhile United Bank for Africa & Standard Trust Bank, where she co-chaired the Branding Sub-Committee. She also served as a key member of the Media Relations Sub-Committee.

Until her election as the deputy governor of Ekiti State, she was head of corporate services, Ecobank Transatlantic Inc., where she was responsible for communicating the bank's activities to the public, relationship management with the public and providing feedback to management as it relates to the total image of the bank. In addition, she also oversaw the General Internal Services Unit with responsibility for overall co-ordination of administrative services for the entire bank.

== Election ==
Following a disputed election process during the 2007 Gubernatorial elections, the candidate of Nigeria's ruling People's Democratic Party, Segun Oni was declared winner of that election. Whereupon Olayinka in conjunction with Kayode Fayemi headed to court to contest the veracity of the results. On 14 October 2010, after a 3 1/2-year prolonged re-election process and court battle, an Elections Appeal Tribunal sitting in Ilorin, Kwara State, Nigeria sacked former governor Segun Oni of the Peoples Democratic Party (PDP) and declared Dr Kayode Fayemi of the Action Congress of Nigeria (ACN) as the new governor of Ekiti State. Mrs Olufunmilayo Olayinka was subsequently sworn in as the substantive deputy governor of Ekiti State by virtue of her existing role as the running mate of Dr Kayode Fayemi during the 2007 governorship elections. She is only the second woman in the history of Ekiti State to occupy the position of deputy governor of the state. She was a member of the Action Congress of Nigeria.

== Death ==
Olayinka died in the evening of 6 April 2013 after a long battle with cancer and she was laid to rest in Ado-Ekiti.

Olayinka was a devout Christian; she was survived by her aged mother, husband and their three children.
