= Biodun Oyebanji =

Nigerian politician (born 1967)

His Excellency Biodun Oyebanji

Governor of Ekiti State
- Incumbent
- Assumed office 16 October 2022
- Deputy: Monisade Afuye
- Preceded by: Kayode Fayemi

Secretary to the Ekiti State Government
- In office 18 October 2018 – 7 December 2021
- Governor: Kayode Fayemi

Personal details
- Born: Abiodun Abayomi Oyebanji; 21 December 1967 (age 58) Ikogosi, Western State (now in Ekiti State), Nigeria
- Party: All Progressives Congress
- Spouse: Olayemi Oyebanji
- Education: Masters in International Relations & Strategic Studies
- Alma mater: University of Ibadan; Ekiti State University

Abiodun Abayomi Oyebanji // (born 21 December 1967) is a Nigerian politician who has served as the governor of Ekiti State since 2022. He was a former Secretary to the Ekiti State Government and a former Chief of Staff to the Governor of Ekiti State. He was elected governor during the 2022 Ekiti State gubernatorial election, having defeated Olusegun Oni of the Social Democratic Party and Bisi Kolawole of the Peoples Democratic Party.

== Education ==
Oyebanji attended Awo Community High School before transferring to C.A.C Grammar School in Efon-Alaaye, Ekiti State, and then the Federal School of Art and Science in Ondo State and the District Commercial Secondary School in Aramoko, Ekiti State (1979 to 1983).

In 1989, Oyebanji obtained a Bachelor of Science (BSc.) degree in Political Science from the Ondo State University (now Ekiti State University, Ado-Ekiti), and proceeded to the University of Ibadan, Oyo State in 1992 where he bagged his masters' Degree (M.Sc) in Political Science.

== Career ==
Oyebanji has at various points served in public service through appointments or as a member of committees.

In 1994, Oyebanji was appointed Secretary of the committee set up for the creation of Ekiti State, headed by Baba Deji Falegan. He was also the Secretary of the Ekiti State Development Fund.

When Nigeria reverted to democracy in 1999, at 32 years old, he was named one of the top advisers to Otunba Niyi Adebayo, the state's first democratically elected governor. Oyebanji ascended through the ranks to become the state governor's Chief of Staff in 2003.

In 2009, he was appointed chairman of the governing board, Citizenship and Leadership Training centre under the federal ministry of youth and sports development (June 2009 – December 2010).

In 2010, Oyebanji was appointed the commissioner for integration and inter-governmental affairs and later Ekiti’s office of transformation strategy and delivery (OTSD) a year later by the administration of Kayode Fayemi.

In 2018, Oyebanji was appointed secretary to the state government (SSG) by Kayode Fayemi, after being reelected for a second term as Governor of Ekiti State.

=== Politics ===
In 2021, Oyebanji resigned his position as the Secretary to the State Government to pursue his governorship aspirations.

On 8 December 2021, Oyebanji declared his intention to contest the Ekiti State Gubernatorial Election in 2022.

There were speculations of Oyebanji being the favourite of Fayemi, resulting in inferences of an imposition on the State which led to other aspirants withdrawing from the governorship primaries polls alleging that the "election committee was made up of loyalists of Fayemi".

The grievances of the other aspirants were not addressed by the party hierarchy hence, the primary was held, and Oyebanji polled 101,703 votes, unopposed to emerge as the All Progressives Congress governorship flag bearer in the 2022 Ekiti State gubernatorial election.

On 18 June 2022, Oyebanji was elected governor on the APC platform with a 30% margin over second-place finisher and former Governor Olusegun Oni of the Social Democratic Party. He was officially sworn in as governor of Ekiti State on 16 October 2022.

== Personal life ==
Oyebanji is currently married to Prof. (Mrs) Oyebanji, who is an associate professor at the University of Ibadan and also a princess of Ado Ekiti.
