= 1999 Ekiti State gubernatorial election =

1999 gubernatorial election in Ekiti State, Nigeria

- January 9, 1999
Nominee	Niyi Adebayo
Party	AD	PDP
Popular vote	300,118	112,606
Elected Governor
Niyi Adebayo
AD

The 1999 Ekiti State gubernatorial election occurred in Nigeria on January 9, 1999. The AD nominee Niyi Adebayo won the election defeating the PDP candidate.

Niyi Adebayo emerged AD candidate.

== Electoral system ==
The Governor of Ekiti State is elected using the plurality voting system.

== Primary election ==
=== AD primary ===
The AD primary election was won by Niyi Adebayo.

== Results ==
The total number of registered voters in the state was 1,075,278. Total number of votes cast was 504,958, while number of valid votes was 494,963. Rejected votes were 9,995.

Candidate	Party	Votes	%
Niyi Adebayo	Alliance for Democracy	300,118	72.72
People's Democratic Party	112,606	27.28	
Total		412,724	100.00
Valid votes		412,724	97.64
Invalid/blank votes		9,995	2.36
Total votes		422,719	100.00
Registered voters/turnout		1,075,278	39.31
Source: Nigeria World, IFES, Semantics Scholar
