= Joseph Orji =

Administrator of Gombe State
- In office 7 October 1996 – August 1998
- Succeeded by: Mohammed Bawa

Group Captain Joseph Orji NDA Regular course 11 was appointed the first Military Governor of Gombe State, Nigeria after it was formed in October 1996 from part of Bauchi State during the military regime of General Sani Abacha. He held office until August 1998.

When the civilian government of the Nigerian Fourth Republic took control in May 1999, Orji was among the former military Governors who were required to retire. He became a member of the steering committee of the United Nigeria Development Forum (UNDF), a group of former officers.
