= Atanda Yusuf =

Musbau Atanda Yusuf

Administrator of Ekiti State
- In office August 1998 – 29 May 1999
- Preceded by: Mohammed Bawa
- Succeeded by: Niyi Adebayo

Navy Captain (retired) Musbau Atanda Yusuf was appointed the Administrator of Ekiti State, Nigeria during the transitional regime of General Abdulsalami Abubakar, handing over to the elected civilian governor at the start of the Nigerian Fourth Republic on 29 May 1999.

During his tenure he constructed the complex housing the Ekiti State House of Assembly, inaugurated on 1 June 1999, by his elected civilian successor Otunba Niyi Adebayo. He assisted Sikiru Tae Lawal in creating peace in Ikere-Ekiti, which had been racked by communal strife.

Yusuf was required to retire in June 1999, as were all former military administrators.
