= Ayo Fayose =

Nigerian politician (born 1960)

Governor of Ekiti State
- In office 16 October 2014 – 16 October 2018
- Deputy: Kolapo Olushola
- Preceded by: Kayode Fayemi
- Succeeded by: Kayode Fayemi
- In office 29 May 2003 – 16 October 2006
- Deputy: Abiodun Aluko (2003–2005); Abiodun Olujimi (2005–2006)
- Preceded by: Niyi Adebayo
- Succeeded by: Tunji Olurin

Personal details
- Born: Peter Ayodele Fayose; 15 November 1960 (age 65) Afao Ekiti, Western Region (now in Ekiti State), Nigeria
- Party: Peoples Democratic Party
- Spouse: Feyisetan Fayose
- Occupation: Politician

Peter Ayodele Fayose (born 15 November 1960) is a Nigerian politician who served as governor of Ekiti State from 2003 to 2006, and again from 2014 to 2018.

== Early life ==
Fayose grew up in Oyo State where he attended Olivet Baptist High School, Oyo. In 1985, He was admitted to a Higher National Diploma (HND) programme in Biological Sciences/Applied Medical/Biology by The Polytechnic, Ibadan and graduated in 1987. While doing his National Youth Service Corps program at Pepsi Nigeria Limited, Ibadan, he engaged in installation, maintenance and servicing of medical and laboratory equipment.

He is married to Feyisetan. He conducted one of the most sought after medical outreach programmes during his political campaign in 2001.

== Political career ==
Fayose became the second governor of Ekiti on 29 May 2003, after defeating the incumbent Governor, Niyi Adebayo in the gubernatorial elections. He could not complete his tenure as a result of an impeachment on 16 October 2006.

During the 2014 Ekiti State gubernatorial election, Fayose was again the PDP nominee. He won the election and was declared by the Independent National Electoral Commission as the new Governor of Ekiti State, for a second term as a governor. The then incumbent governor, Dr Kayode Fayemi conceded defeat and was one of the earliest to congratulate Mr Fayose for winning the election. Fayose was inaugurated on 16 October 2014. Fayose is now the only Nigerian to defeat an incumbent two times.

Fayose has also publicly declared his intentions to run for president in Nigerian general election, 2019. His party, The Peoples Democratic Party, PDP, admonished him against the ambition to be the party's presidential candidate in 2019. Fayose later dropped his ambition.

=== Allegation of vote rigging ===
An army intelligence officer, Captain Sagir Koli of the Nigerian Army 32nd Artillery Brigade, secretly recorded a vote-rigging plan on 20 June 2014 when he was asked to accompany his then commanding Officer, Brigadier General Aliyu Momoh, to a meeting at Spotless Hotel in Ado-Ekiti, Ekiti State.

The 37-minute audio recording was attended by the eventual "winner" of the election, Governor Ayodele Fayose of Ekiti State; Senator Iyiola Omisore of Osun State; a member of the National Assembly Abdul Kareem; the Minister for Police Affairs Alhaji Jelili Adesiyan; the former Minister for Police Affairs and navy captain Caleb Olubolade; the Minister of State for Defense Senator Musiliu Obanikoro and PDP Anambra chieftain and failed senate candidate Chris Uba, as they bribed army Brigadier General Momoh with a rank promotion for his assistance in carrying out election fraud in Ekiti State.

For exposing the vote-rigging of the Ekiti State governor election of Fayose, Captain Sagir Koli was praised by the military for his "non-partisanship and professional conduct during the election period."

=== Travails with the EFCC ===
The Economic and Financial Crimes Commission froze four Zenith Bank accounts allegedly used by Fayose to launder money for his Ekiti governorship election in 2014 in a lawsuit no. FHC/CS?871/2016 titled "Federal Republic of Nigeria Vs Zenith bank PLC account numbers 1003126654, 9013074033, 1010170969 and 1013835889."

The judge Justice Mohammed Idris had granted the EFCC on 24 June 2016 an order to freeze all the funds in the said accounts in Zenith Bank. Two accounts belong to Governor Ayo Fayose while the third belongs to his hotel Spotless Hotel in Ado Ekiti. The fourth account was operated by one of Fayose's aides, Abiodun Agbele, who is under EFCC custody.

The EFCC had alleged that those accounts possessed funds, said to be about N4.7 billion (US$20mn) stolen from the office of the National Security Adviser, with most of the money secretly retained by Fayose for his personal use after the election. Ayo Fayose was fingered by former Nigerian Minister of State for Defense, Musiliu Obanikoro as one of the beneficiaries of the $2.1billion arms deal scandal, which saw the illegal diversion and theft of funds that was allegedly appropriated to fight the Boko Haram insurgency.

On 16 July 2025, the Federal High Court in Lagos discharged and acquitted Fayose and Spotless Investment Limited on all 11 counts in the EFCC money-laundering case, after upholding a no-case submission. The EFCC said it was studying the judgment and preparing an appeal.

Fayose is alleged to own a radio station, Our People's FM, on 104.1 MHz in Ado Ekiti. The station was forcibly seized for a time in 2019, allegedly due to land use violations, though political considerations were also mentioned.

== Challenged Aisha Buhari To Travel To USA ==
On 22 June 2016, Fayose had claimed that Aisha Buhari, the wife of the Nigerian president Muhammadu Buhari was the same person (who had claimed to be a daughter of General Muhammadu Buhari) indicted by a US Court for transferring $170,000 to indicted US Congressman, Williams Jefferson, in the William J. Jefferson corruption case involving Halliburton and that she was avoiding arrest by US authorities by failing to accompany her husband on his three presidential visits to the United States.

However, when Aisha Buhari travelled to Washington DC on 4 August 2016, Fayose subsequently claimed that her US visit did not invalidate the Haliburton judgement against her, saying "Has traveling to the US invalidated the judgment that said Aisha Buhari transferred $170,000 to Jefferson's account?" and "Has traveling to the US erased the fact that Aisha Buhari transferred $170,000 to Williams Jefferson?"

== See also ==
- Temitope Aluko
- List of Yoruba people
