= Monisade Afuye =

Nigerian politician (born 1958)

Her Excellency Monisade Afuye

Deputy Governor of Ekiti State
- Incumbent
- Assumed office 16 October 2022
- Governor: Biodun Oyebanji
- Preceded by: Bisi Egbeyemi

Personal details
- Born: Monisade Christiana Afuye; 28 September 1958 (age 68) Ikere-Ekiti, Western Region, British Nigeria (now in Ekiti State, Nigeria)
- Party: APC
- Education: Crown Polytechnic
- Occupation: Politician; caterer; public administrator

Chief Monisade Christiana Afuye (born 28 September 1958) is a Nigerian politician who has served as the deputy governor of Ekiti State since 2022.

== Biography ==
Monisade Christiana Afuye was born on 28 September 1958 in Ikere-Ekiti, Ikere local government area. She had her primary education at Saint Joseph CAC Primary School Aramoko, Aramoko Ekiti, and her secondary education at Amoye Grammar school, Ikere-Ekiti. She earned her Ordinary National Diploma and Higher National Diploma in Public Administration from Crown Polytechnic, Ado Ekiti, Ekiti State.
