= Hyacinth Alia =

Nigerian Catholic priest and politician

His Excellency Hyacinth Iormem Alia
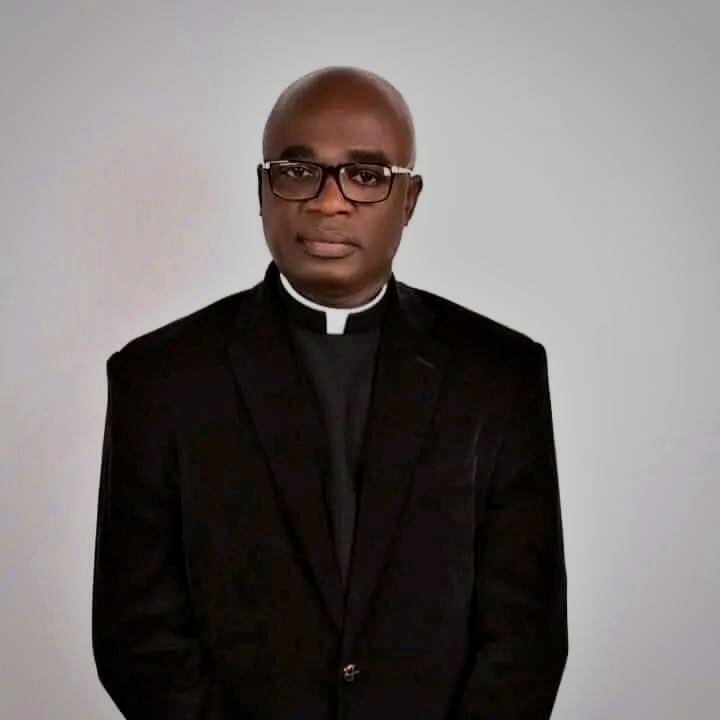

19th Governor of Benue State
- Incumbent
- Assumed office 29 May 2023
- Deputy: Samuel Ode
- Preceded by: Samuel Ortom

Personal details
- Born: 15 May 1966 (age 60) Mbangur, Mbadede, Vandeikya, Benue State, Nigeria
- Party: All Progressives Congress
- Occupation: Politician, Catholic priest

Hyacinth Iormem Alia (born 15 May 1966) is a Nigerian Catholic cleric and politician who has been a serving governor of Benue State since 29 May 2023.

== Early life and education ==
Hyacinth Alia was born on 15 May 1966, in Mbangur, Mbadede, Vandeikya local government area of Benue State. He got his First School Leaving Certificate from St. Francis Primary school, Agidi, Mbatiav in Gboko local government area of the state and in 1983, he enrolled at St. James Minor Seminary, Makurdi. He gained admission to study at St. Augustine's Major Seminary, Jos. He studied for a diploma in Religious studies in 1987 and a Bachelor of Arts in Sacred Theology in 1990. In 1999, he obtained a Master's in Religious Education (Psychology and Counseling) at Fordham University, Bronx, New York City. In 2004, he got an additional master's degree in biomedical ethics from Duquesne University, Pennsylvania. He received a doctorate in the same course at Duquesne in 2005, but his dissertation is not in the library holdings.

== Ordination ==
Hyacinth Alia was ordained a Catholic priest on 7 July 1990, by Bishop Athanasius Atule Usuh of Makurdi Catholic Diocese.

Governorship (2023–Present) Alia was sworn in as the Governor of Benue State on 29 May 2023. Upon assuming office, he prioritized civil service reforms, notably ensuring the regular payment of salaries and pensions, which had been a point of contention under previous administrations.

His administration’s "Strategic Development Plan" focused on infrastructural renewal in Makurdi, the state capital, and the rural electrification of several local government areas. In 2024, Alia launched the Benue State Youth Empowerment Scheme, aimed at reducing unemployment through agricultural subsidies. Despite his administrative focus, his tenure has been dismal regarding internal security and farmer-herder tensions, which remain unresolved.

=== Infrastructure and urban renewal ===
Upon assuming office, Alia initiated an urban renewal campaign, beginning with the simultaneous construction of 16 township roads in Makurdi. By 2025, his administration had expanded this to over 50 road projects across the state, including the construction of major flyovers and underpasses at the High-Level roundabout in Makurdi and Gyado Junction in Gboko to ease traffic congestion.

In late 2025, the administration secured a €25 million intervention fund from the European Investment Bank to construct a 500-kilometer rural road network and 78 culverts and bridges, aimed at facilitating the transport of agricultural produce from rural areas to urban markets.

=== Security and public safety ===
To address Benue's long-standing security challenges, Alia established "Operation Nyan Nyor," a specialized security outfit designed to combat kidnapping and cattle rustling. He also restructured the State Volunteer Guards into the "Civil Protection Guards" to enhance community-led intelligence gathering.

Critics however have called his commitment to the security of persons in his state into question due to allegations that agents of his administration have been involved in sponsoring thugs to harass political opponents.

In 2025, Alia advocated for the establishment of state police to provide a more localized response to farmer-herder conflicts and worked with the Federal Government to upgrade five police stations to full Divisions in flashpoint areas like Yelwata and Jato-Aka. His administration has also overseen the resettlement of thousands of Internally Displaced Persons (IDPs) back to their ancestral homes through a phased security deployment plan.

Awards and recognition Since taking office, Alia has received several accolades for his governance and humanitarian background:

Governor of the Year (Humanitarian Service): Awarded at the 2024 National Awards for Excellence for his focus on IDP (Internally Displaced Persons) welfare.

Leadership Newspaper Award: Named "Governor of the Year" in early 2025 for his fiscal discipline and debt management strategies.

Peace Ambassador Award: Recognized by the Inter-Faith Coalition for maintaining religious harmony within the state.

== Awards and recognition ==
- Leadership Governor of the Year (2023): Awarded by Leadership Newspaper in March 2024 for achievements in infrastructure and civil service reforms.
- North-Central Governor of the Year (Digital Economy): Awarded in 2024 for his efforts in digital transformation and the establishment of the Benue Digital Infrastructure Company (BDIC).
- African Eagle Award (2025): Honored as the Best Governor in Socio-Economic Development Initiative at the Accolade Africa Growth Summit in London.
