= Kolapo Olushola =

Nigerian politician

Kolapo Olusola

Deputy Governor of Ekiti State
- In office 16 October 2014 – 16 October 2018
- Governor: Ayodele Fayose
- Preceded by: Modupe Adelabu
- Succeeded by: Bisi Egbeyemi

Personal details
- Party: Peoples Democratic Party
- Education: Obafemi Awolowo University; University of Lagos
- Profession: Politician; academic

Kolapo Olubunmi Olushola Eleka is a Nigerian academic, professor of building technology and politician who served as the deputy governor of Ekiti State from 2014 to 2018.

== Early life and education ==
Kolapo Olushola started his schooling at St. Matthew's Primary School Ikere-Ekiti between the year 1972 to 1978. He then proceeded to Annunciation Secondary School where he had his Secondary education. He was a student of Obafemi Awolowo University (OAU) where he obtained both his Bsc & PhD. He obtained his Msc in Construction Technology from the University of Lagos in 1993.

== Political career ==
He was a former deputy governor of Ekiti State.
