= Secretary to the State Government =

Official in the state governments of Nigeria

The Secretary to the State Government (SSG) is an official in the state governments of Nigeria's 36 states and second executive official after the Deputy Governor of every State. The individual who holds the office is usually appointed by the State Governor.

== Role ==
The Secretary to the State Government is a high-ranking appointed executive branch official whose main responsibility is to assist the government achieve its vision and objectives through the provision of advice and guidance. In addition, the Secretary to the State Government handles policy-making and oversees the implementation of decisions, policies and programmes as well as the operations of government ministries, agencies and parastatals.

The Secretary to the State Government is in charge of its subsidiaries including the State Executive Council Secretariat, the General Administration Office, the State Directorate of Volunteer Services (DVS), the Speech Writing Unit and the state office of the New Partnership for Africa's Development (NEPAD).

== Current SSGs ==
List of current SSGs by state
SSG	Jurisdiction	Term start	Ref.	SSG	Jurisdiction	Term start	Ref.
Barr. Chris Ezem	Abia State			Abdullahi Baffa Bichi	Kano State		
Awwal D. Tukur	Adamawa State			Abdullahi Faskari	Katsina State		
Emmanuel E. Ekuwem	Akwa Ibom State			Safiyanu Garba Bena	Kebbi State		
Professor Solo Chukwulobelu	Anambra State			Mrs. Folashade Arike Ayoade	Kogi State		
Dr Aminu Hammayo	Bauchi State			Mamman Saba Jibril	Kwara State		
Prof. Nimibofa Ayawei	Bayelsa State			Barr. Abimbola Salu-Hundeyin	Lagos State		
Barr. Aber Serumun Deborah	Benue State			Barr. Labaran Magaji	Nasarawa State		
Malam Bukar Tijani	Borno State			Alhaji Abubakar Usman Gawu	Niger State		
Tina Banku Agbor	Cross River State			Mr. Olatokunbo Joseph Talabi	Ogun State		
Dr. Kingsley Eze Emu	Delta State				Ondo State		
Dr. Kenneth Ugbala	Ebonyi State			Telim Igbalaye	Osun State		
Barr. Musa Umar Ikhilor	Edo State			Prof. Olanike K. Adeyemo	Oyo State		
	Ekiti State			Arch. Samuel Jatau	Plateau State		
	Enugu State				Rivers State		
	Gombe State			Alhaji Bello Sifawa	Sokoto State		
	Imo State			Timothy Kataps	Taraba State		
Malam Bala Ibrahim	Jigawa State			Dr Muhammad Goje	Yobe State		
Abdulkadir Mayere	Kaduna State			Mal. Abubakar M. Nakwada	Zamfara State		
