= Olusegun Oni =

Nigerian politician (born 1954)

Deputy National Chairman of All Progressive Congress (South)
- In office 2014–2020

Governor of Ekiti State
- In office 6 May 2009 – 15 October 2010
- Deputy: Sikiru Tae Lawal
- Preceded by: Tunji Odeyemi (acting)
- Succeeded by: Kayode Fayemi
- In office 29 May 2007 – 17 February 2009
- Deputy: Sikiru Tae Lawal
- Preceded by: Tope Ademiluyi (acting)
- Succeeded by: Tunji Odeyemi (acting)

Personal details
- Born: 5 September 1954 (age 72) Ifaki, Southern Region, British Nigeria (now in Ekiti State, Nigeria)
- Party: Social Democratic Party (since 2022)
- Other political affiliations: Peoples Democratic Party (before 2014); All Progressives Congress (2014–2022)
- Occupation: Politician

Olusegun Oni (born 5 September 1954) is a Nigerian politician who served as governor of Ekiti State from 29 May 2007 to 17 February 2009 and from 6 May 2009 to 15 October 2010. He was a member of the ruling Peoples Democratic Party (PDP). In 2014 he defected from the PDP and joined the newly formed opposition party All Progressive Congress (APC) where He was given the position of Deputy National Chairman South from 2014 to 2020.

== Birth and education ==
Olusegun Oni was born at Ifaki, Ekiti State on 5 September 1954. He attended the Methodist Secondary Modern School, Ifaki Ekiti (1965–1968) and Wesley College, Ibadan (1969–1971). He took a post at the Community Secondary Modern School, Ido Ekiti, from January 1972 to July 1973, then moved to Ayetoro-Iloro High School, Ayetoro/Iloro Ekiti, moving to the University of Ife in September 1974.

Segun became a corporate member, Nigerian Society of Engineers in 1987. In 1988, he became a COREN registered Engineer. He was Treasurer, Lagos State Chapter of the Nigerian Society of Chemical Engineers (1986–1988). Segun Oni was a foundation member of the United Nigeria Congress Party (UNCP) in Ekiti.

== Governor of Ekiti State ==
Olusegun Oni was elected governor of Ekiti State in April 2007 on the PDP platform. He was removed from office on 15 October 2010 following the Judgement of an Appeal Court which ruled against him.

== Election controversy ==
Oni's election as governor has been contentious with his main opponent in the 2007 general election, Dr. Kayode Fayemi challenging his victory at the Election Petition Tribunal in Ekiti State.

Segun Oni was briefly thrown out of office after the court of appeal upturned the decision of a lower court after the April 2007 general election. In Ekiti State, an effort to get a governor at a point during his tenure using the re-run election of 2009 was "marked by violence and intimidation since the man elected back in 2007, Segun Oni, was thrown out of office after massive vote-rigging emerged".

Apart from violence, adding to the controversy was the conduct of the electoral commissioner who initially refused to announce the results of the re-run election. "The electoral commissioner was supposed to announce poll results last week after the initial re-run but refused to do so, alleging fraud, and temporarily went into hiding". The result of the re-run election was also challenged by his arch-rival, Dr. Kayode Fayemi at the Ekiti State re-Constituted Election Petition Tribunal.

In May 2010, Oni won by a split decision (3:2) at the election petition tribunal. "The Election Petition Tribunal sitting in Ado-Ekiti, the Ekiti State capital, upheld the election of incumbent Governor Segun Oni, thereby dismissing the petition filed by the Action Congress (AC) Governorship candidate, Dr. Kayode Fayemi". The "Majority ruling declares Oni winner with 109,000 to Dr. Kayode Fayemi's 106,000 after deductions of unlawful votes were made" ruling opposed this by upholding that "We hold that the Petitioners have duly and dutifully proved their case". Two judges supported the minority judgement while three judges endorsed the majority ruling. He was removed from office on 15 October following the Judgement of the Appeal Court which ruled against him in favour of his opponent Kayode Fayemi.

== Personal life ==
Oni is married to Olukemi Adetola (née Ogunsiji) and they have two children, a girl and a boy.
