= Kayode Fayemi =

Nigerian politician (born 1965)

Kayode Fayemi CON

Governor of Ekiti State
- In office 16 October 2018 – 16 October 2022
- Deputy: Bisi Egbeyemi
- Preceded by: Ayodele Fayose
- Succeeded by: Biodun Oyebanji
- In office 16 October 2010 – 16 October 2014
- Deputy: Funmilayo Olayinka (2010–2013); Modupe Adelabu (2013–2014)
- Preceded by: Olusegun Oni
- Succeeded by: Ayodele Fayose

Minister of Solid Minerals Development
- In office 11 November 2015 – 30 May 2018
- President: Muhammadu Buhari
- Preceded by: Musa Mohammed Sada
- Succeeded by: Abubakar Bwari

Personal details
- Born: John Olukayode Fayemi; 9 February 1965 (age 61) Ibadan, Western Region (now in Oyo State), Nigeria
- Party: All Progressives Congress (since 2013)
- Other political affiliations: Action Congress of Nigeria (before 2013)
- Spouse: Bisi Adeleye (m. 1989)
- Education: Doctorate in War Studies
- Alma mater: University of Lagos; University of Ife; King's College London
- Occupation: Politician

John Olukayode Fayemi CON (born 9 February 1965) is a Nigerian politician who served as governor of Ekiti State from 2018 to 2022. He previously served in office between 2010 and 2014 before losing re-election to Ayodele Fayose. He was also the Minister of Solid Minerals Development in President Muhammadu Buhari's cabinet from 11 November 2015 to 30 May 2018, when he resigned to contest for a second term as Governor of Ekiti State. He is the pioneer president of the Forum of Regions of Africa (FORAF) since 9 September 2022.

== Early life ==
John Olukayode Folorunso Fayemi was born in Ibadan on 9 February 1965 to an Ekiti parentage from Isan-Ekiti in Oye Local Government of Ekiti State.

== Education ==
Fayemi had his primary education at ICC Primary School, Agodi, Ibadan, Oyo State between 1970 and 1975 and attended Christ's School Ado Ekiti from 1975 to 1980. He later went on to receive degrees in history, politics and international relations from the University of Lagos and University of Ife (now Obafemi Awolowo University). From 1989 to 1992, he earned a doctorate in war studies from King's College London, specializing in civil-military relations.

== Career ==
After his first degree in 1984, he proceeded on the mandatory one-year National Youth Service Corps from 1985 to 1986, during which he was a lecturer at the Nigeria-Police Training College in Sokoto. After his service year, he served as a research officer at Development & Management Consultants in Ikeja between 1987 and 1989. When he moved to the United Kingdom to pursue his doctoral studies between 1991 and 1993, he worked as a research officer at the African Research and Information Bureau in London. In 1992, he was a tutorial fellow at the War Studies Department at King's College, London, during his doctoral studies. Later between 1993 and 1995, he was the Strategy Development Adviser of Deptford City Challenge in London and later served as the Secretary General of the Media Empowerment for Africa (The Radio Foundation) in London between 1995 and 1997. He was also a journalist with The Guardian and City Tempo; and the editor of Nigeria-Now, a defunct political monthly magazine. In 1997, Fayemi returned to Nigeria, where he established the Centre for Democracy and Development Centre for Democracy & Development, a research and training institution dedicated to the study and promotion of democratic development, peace-building and human security in Africa, where he served as Director from 1997 to 2006.

Kayode Fayemi has taught in Africa, Europe, the Americas and Asia. He has also served as an adviser on transitional justice, regional integration, constitutionalism, security sector reform and civil-military relations issues to various governments, inter-governmental institutions and development agencies. He was the main technical adviser to Nigeria's The Human Rights Violations Investigation Commission (Oputa Panel), which investigated past abuses and served on the Presidential Implementation Committees on Security Sector Reform, NEPAD and the Millennium Development Goals. He was technical expert to the Economic Community of West African States (ECOWAS) on small arms and light weapons and United Nations Economic Commission for Africa on governance issues. At other times he has served as a consultant to the OECD on Security Sector Reform and chaired the Commonwealth Human Rights Initiative's Committee of Experts on developing guiding principles and mechanisms of constitution making in Commonwealth Africa.

On 9 September 2022, Fayemi emerged as the first elected president of the Forum of Regions of Africa (FORAF), a forum which is organised by United Cities and Local Governments of Africa, UCLG Africa in collaboration with the Association of Moroccan Regions (ARM), the Council of the Oriental Region (CRO) and the Directorate General of Territorial Collectivities (DGCT) of the Ministry of the Interior of the Kingdom of Morocco. This Forum brought together for the first time the Presidents of regions, counties and federal states of more than 20 African countries that have a second level of decentralised territorial government, including Nigeria, South Africa, Burkina Faso, Cameroon, Côte d'Ivoire, Kenya, Madagascar, Mali, Niger, etc.

== Elections ==
In 2006, Fayemi made his entry into partisan politics ahead of the 2007 election during which he contested for Governor of Ekiti State under the defunct Action Congress. After three and a half years fighting through the legal system, on 15 October 2010 the appeal court sitting in Kwara state declared Fayemi the duly elected Governor of Ekiti State, and marked the end of Olusegun Oni's administration as the then Governor of the state. Daily Trust, a national daily, captured the electoral journey in its editorial, published on Friday, 22 October 2010 under the title, Closure to Ekiti 2007 Governorship Saga.

== Governor of Ekiti State ==
In April 2014, Fayemi was endorsed as the governorship candidates of the All Progressives Congress in the state's gubernatorial elections slated for 21 June 2014. The emergence of Fayemi was preceded by congress held before the governor who had no contestant was endorsed as the flag bearers of their state in the governorship elections. Kayode Fayemi was defeated at the polls on 21 June 2014 by previous governor Ayodele Fayose.

Fayemi recontested for second term as Ekiti state governor under the platform of the All Progressive Congress in the 14 July 2018 governorship election after resigning as the Minister of Solid Minerals Development. He was officially declared the winner of the 2018 Ekiti State gubernatorial election by the Independent National Electoral Commission on 15 July 2018. He won by 19,345 votes against the Peoples Democratic Party's Kolapo Olusola Eleka who was second.

In October 2018, Fayemi was sworn in as Ekiti State governor for the second time. Fayemi was elected chairman of the Nigeria Governors' Forum. This announcement was made by the immediate past chairman, Abdulaziz Yari on Wednesday evening. He said Fayemi was unanimously elected by the governors to lead the forum till 2021.

== Controversies ==
=== Anti-corruption petition ===
The Independent Corrupt Practices Commission (ICPC) in 2016 investigated Fayemi's tenure as Governor of Ekiti State from 2010 to 2014, for an alleged misappropriation of over N25 billion infrastructure bond by his government. The outcome of the investigation showed that Fayemi was innocent. In July 2020, he was accused of "financial impropriety" relating to the Ajaokuta Steel Mill during his tenure as Minister of Solid Minerals from 2015 to 2018. All charges were later dropped and he was found innocent.

=== Succession tussle ===
In January 2022, Fayemi was accused of bribery and electoral fraud surrounding the 2022 Ekiti APC gubernatorial primary. Reports that Fayemi had bribed the APC primary committee and INEC officials in the days before the primary led to the withdrawal of all candidates aside from the Fayemi-supported Abiodun Oyebanji. Such extreme efforts were speculated to be connected to Fayemi's desire to have an ally as his successor to give a boost to his likely 2022 presidential candidacy. This allegation was dismissed by Governor Abubakar Badaru of Jigawa State, who chaired the panel that conducted the primary election and maintained that the outcome of the exercise was a reflection of the wishes of supporters of the party in the state. Oyebanji emerged victorious from the primary, receiving nearly 97% of the vote with a margin of over 100,000 votes. The Independent National Electoral Commission also informed the court that the January 27 governorship primary election of the Ekiti All Progressives Congress (APC), which it monitored, was free, fair and credible. In its ruling, the Federal High Court found the allegation of electoral manipulation to be baseless and unfounded, and it threw out the suit filed by a contestant in the 27 January 2022 Ekiti All Progressives Congress (APC) governorship primaries, Kayode Ojo, challenging the victory of the Governor-elect, Biodun Oyebanji.

== End SARS protest ==
In October 2020 during the nationwide #EndSARS protest he joined the protesters at the protest grounds to express his support for their demand but advised on the need for them to have an exit strategy and on the need to create a window of dialogue with the Federal Government on their demands before the protest was hijacked. He narrated his experience as one of the notable faces of the anti-military and protesters that facilitated the current democratic order. He said his group knew when to pause to negotiate with the government and that made them successful. He said this at The Africa Policy Dialogue Series virtual symposium held by the Harvard Kenny Alumni Association of Nigeria with the theme: Harnessing Africa's Demographic Dividend for Peace, Security and Productivity through Investments in Youth. He admitted that the youths, who were actively participating in the #EndSARS protest at the time, had a right to demand for good governance and an end to police brutality, saying the government owes that to them.

== Fellows and membership ==
- Kayode Fayemi is a Fellow of the Centre for Peace and Conflict Studies, University of Ibadan
- Adjunct Professor of Security Studies at the African Centre for Strategic Studies, National Defense University, Fort McNair, Washington, D.C., United States.
- He was also a visiting professor in the African Studies Programme at Northwestern University, Evanston, United States, in 2004.
- Dr Fayemi serves on numerous Boards including the Governing Board of the Open Society Justice Institute, Baobab for Women's Human Rights, African Security Sector Network, and on the Advisory Board of the Global Facilitation Network on Security Sector Reform and on the Management Culture Board of the ECOWAS Secretariat.
- Member, Africa Policy Advisory Panel of the British Government.

== Writings ==
Fayemi has written on governance and democratization, civil-military relations and security sector issues in Africa. Among his recent books are: Deepening the Culture of Constitutionalism: The Role of Regional Institutions in Constitutional Development in Africa (CDD, 2003), Security Sector Governance in Africa: A Handbook (edited with Nicole Ball, CDD, 2004) and Out of the Shadows: Exile and the Struggle for Freedom and Democracy in Nigeria (CDD, 2005).

== Award ==
In October 2022, a Nigerian national honour of Commander of the Order of the Niger (CON) was conferred on him by President Muhammadu Buhari.

== See also ==
- List of governors of Ekiti State
