= Niyi Adebayo =

Nigerian politician and lawyer (born 1958)

Otunba Niyi Adebayo

Minister of Industry, Trade and Investment
- In office 21 August 2019 – 29 May 2023
- President: Muhammadu Buhari
- Preceded by: Okechukwu Enelamah
- Succeeded by: Doris Anite

Governor of Ekiti State
- In office 29 May 1999 – 29 May 2003
- Deputy: Paul Alabi
- Preceded by: Atanda Yusuf
- Succeeded by: Ayo Fayose

Personal details
- Born: 4 February 1958 (age 68)
- Party: All Progressives Congress (2014–present)
- Other political affiliations: Alliance for Democracy (1998–2006); Action Congress of Nigeria (2006–2014)
- Education: University of Lagos (LL.B.)
- Occupation: Politician; lawyer

Otunba Adeniyi Adebayo (born 4 February 1958) is a Nigerian lawyer and politician who served as the Minister of Industry, Trade and Investment of Nigeria from August 2019 to May 2023. He previously served as the first democratically elected governor of Ekiti State from 29 May 1999 to 29 May 2003 on the platform of the Alliance for Democracy (AD).

He is currently a member of the All Progressives Congress, and is a top chieftain in the party. He was appointed minister of trade in August 2019 by President Muhammadu Buhari following the announcement of his second cabinet. Adebayo has extensive experience in a wide range of disputes and legal and advisory work. His more notable achievements have been in the areas of project finance, oil and gas, contract procurement and business facilitation. He is a member of Nigerian Bar Association (NBA) and the International Bar Association (IBA).

== Education ==
He attended University of Lagos where he studied Law and obtained (LL.B Hons).

== Personal life ==
Adebayo is a keen sportsman and plays tennis, squash and football.
