= All Progressives Congress =

Nigerian political party

- Chairperson: Nentawe Yilwatda (PL)
- Secretary: Ajibola Basiru (OS)
- Chair of the Governors Forum: Hope Uzodinma (IM)
- Founders: Tom Ikimi; Annie Okonkwo; Ibrahim Shekarau; Garba Shehu
- Founded: 6 February 2013; 13 years ago
- Merger of: ACN; CPC; ANPP
- Headquarters: 40 Blantyre Street, off Adetokunbo Ademola Street, Wuse II, Abuja, FCT
- Ideology: Big tent; Social conservatism; Factions: Federalism
- Political position: Centre to centre-left
- International affiliation: Socialist International (consultative, formerly)
- Colours: Light blue (customary); Green; White; Red
- Seats in the Senate: 88 / 109 (81%)
- Seats in the House of Representatives: 242 / 360 (67%)
- Governorships: 31 / 36 (86%)
- Seats in state Houses of Assembly: 598 / 991 (60%)

Website
- apc.com.ng

The All Progressives Congress (APC) is one of the major contemporary political parties in Nigeria, along with the African Democratic Congress (ADC), Nigeria Democratic Congress (NDC), Peoples Democratic Party (PDP). Founded on 6 February 2013 through the merger of three major opposition parties, the party came to power following the victory of party candidate Muhammadu Buhari in the 2015 presidential election. This marked the first time in Nigerian history that an opposition party unseated a governing party and power was transferred peacefully.

In 2015, the APC won the majority of seats in the Senate and the House of Representatives, although it fell shy of winning a super-majority to override the ability of PDP to block legislation. During Buhari's first term, waves of defections led the party to lose its federal legislative majorities in 2018, with both Senate President Bukola Saraki and House Speaker Yakubu Dogara among the dozens of lawmakers that defected to the PDP. Nonetheless, Buhari was reelected in the 2019 general election, which also saw the party solidify its majorities in both chambers.

In the 2023 general election, APC candidate Bola Tinubu won the presidential election. He was declared winner by Independent National Electoral Commission (INEC) polling 8,794,726 votes.

== Formation ==
Formed in February 2013, the party is the result of a merger of Nigeria's three largest opposition parties – the Action Congress of Nigeria (ACN), the Congress for Progressive Change (CPC), and the All Nigeria Peoples Party (ANPP) along with a breakaway faction of the All Progressives Grand Alliance (APGA) and the new PDP – a faction of then ruling People's Democratic Party. The resolution was signed by Tom Ikimi, who represented the ACN; Senator Annie Okonkwo on behalf of APGA; Ibrahim Shekarau, the Chairman of ANPP's Merger Committee; and Garba Shehu, the Chairman of CPC's Merger Committee.

The party received approval from the nation's Independent National Electoral Commission (INEC) on 31 July 2013 to become a political party and subsequently withdrew the operating licenses of the three parties that merged (the ACN, CPC and ANPP). In March 2013, it was reported that two other associations – African Peoples Congress and All Patriotic Citizens – also applied for INEC registration, adopting APC as an acronym as well, reportedly "a development interpreted to be a move to thwart the successful coalition of the opposition parties, ahead of the 2015 general elections." It was reported in April 2013 that the party was considering changing its name to the All Progressive Congress of Nigeria (APCN) to avoid further complications. However, the party name remained.

== History ==
=== 2013–2015 ===
In November 2013, five serving Governors from the governing PDP defected to the APC: Rotimi Amaechi of Rivers State, Abdulfatah Ahmed of Kwara State, Rabiu Kwankwaso of Kano State, Murtala Nyako of Adamawa State and Aliyu Wamakko of Sokoto State. It had been previously reported that Governors Mu'azu Babangida Aliyu of Niger State and Sule Lamido of Jigawa State were set to defect from the People's Democratic Party to the APC; however, both ended up remaining with the People's Democratic Party. Amid the governors' defections, nearly 50 federal legislators (including Speaker of the House of Representatives Aminu Tambuwal) joined the party, adding to the 137 legislators in the APC as a result of the prior merger of the smaller opposition parties. These legislative defections initially gave the APC a slim majority of 186 legislators in the Lower House out of a total of 360 legislators; however, subsequent political wrangling and pressure from political factions and interests outside the National Assembly, gave the party only 37 additional legislators thus giving the APC a nominal majority of 172 out of 360 Legislators, as opposed to the PDP's 171 (although some smaller PDP-allied parties held the balance of the other seats). This was further confirmed when the party seated 179 members on 15 January 2015 when the House resumed after a long recess to finally affirm its majority.

Among the party's first electoral tests were a number of off-year gubernatorial elections with the party nominee coming third in Anambra State in 2013 while the next year, the APC incumbent was unseated in Ekiti State but the party's incumbent in Osun State was re-elected. Despite its short history, the party faced infighting in 2014 as several notable members including Okonkwo, Ikimi, and Shekarau resigned from the party and joined the PDP.

=== 2015 elections ===
2015 presidential election results by state

Ahead of the elections, the party presidential primary was held on 10 December 2014 with former military dictator Muhammadu Buhari winning by a significant margin. In the federal elections on 28 and 29 March 2015, Buhari emerged victorious over incumbent Goodluck Jonathan by 2.6 million votes—a margin of nine percentage points. The APC expanded its House of Representatives majority to over 210 seats and gained a majority in the Senate with 60 seats. In state elections (mainly on 11 April), 21 governorships were won by the APC while the party also won the majority of state Houses of Assembly.

=== 2015–2019 ===
At the start of the legislative session in June 2015, the picks of the party leadership and Buhari for legislative leadership—Ahmad Lawan (Yobe North) for President of the Senate and Femi Gbajabiamila (Surulere I) for Speaker of the House of Representatives—lost elections to those offices as dissenting APC members and PDP members voted for different leadership: Bukola Saraki (APC-Kwara Central) for Senate President and Yakubu Dogara (APC-Bogoro/Dass/Tafawa Balewa) for Speaker of the House. Although Gbajabiamila became House Majority Leader in 2015 and Lawan later became Senate Majority Leader in 2017, their defeat for the prime position of each body set up a legislature that often feuded with the Buhari-led executive.

The party did well electorally during Buhari's first term, with a victories both the Edo State and Ondo State gubernatorial elections in 2016 but a loss in the Anambra State gubernatorial election in 2017. The next year, the party gained the Ekiti State governorship and held the Osun State governorship. However, the APC faced larger issues in holding its members together as number of prominent defections (former Vice President Atiku Abubakar, former House of Representatives Speaker and incumbent Governor of Sokoto State Aminu Tambuwal, former Governor of Kano State and Senator Rabiu Kwankwaso, and incumbent Governor of Benue State Samuel Ortom) occurred throughout 2017 and 2018 during an internal crisis that culminated in the defections of Saraki and Dogara along with the loss of the parties' federal legislative majorities.

As an organisation, the party also faced problems during this period as party chairman John Odigie Oyegun, who had served in the role since party foundation, came under intense criticism from various internal factions in 2017 and 2018 despite Buhari's support for Odigie Oyegun. Although Buhari initially pushed for Odigie Oyegun to continue in the position, he eventually agreed with governors in April 2018 to hold party congresses and elect new leadership. After state parties held state congresses in May 2018, the national party held its convention in June and elected former Governor of Edo State Adams Oshiomhole as National Chairman; Mai Mala Buni continued in the National Secretary role while former Senator Lawali Shuaibu became Deputy National Chairman (North) and former Governor of Ekiti State Niyi Adebayo became Deputy National Chairman (South).

=== 2019 elections ===
2019 presidential election results by state

After direct primaries where Buhari was the sole candidate, he advanced to the general election where he defeated Atiku Abubakar of the People's Democratic Party by a margin of 14 percentage points—nearly 4 million votes. For the legislative elections, the APC regained its majorities in both the House of Representatives and the Senate after losing the majorities due to defections in 2018. On the state level, the party lost four governorships and gained two governorships leading to a net loss of two governors' offices while winning a majority of state Houses of Assembly.

=== 2019–2022 ===
At the start of the legislative session in June 2019, the previous picks of the party leadership and Buhari for legislative leadership from 2015—Ahmad Lawan (Yobe North) for President of the Senate and Femi Gbajabiamila (Surulere I) for Speaker of the House of Representatives—successfully won election to those offices as the party avoided large scale internal dissent unlike 2015. The Lawan-led Senate and Gbajabiamila-helmed House of Representatives were much closer to the executive compared to the previous National Assembly, with critics even derisively referring to the assembly as a "rubber stamp".

In off-year elections, results were mixed as the APC incumbent in Ondo State won re-election but the APC-turned-PDP incumbent in Edo State also held his office in 2020. Coupled with the loss of Edo, the party came a distant third in the Anambra State gubernatorial election in 2021 and the APC incumbent was unseated in Osun State the next year; though, the party held the Ekiti State governorship in 2022. As a part of a concerted effort to woo defectors, three governors joined the APC—Ebonyi State's Dave Umahi, Cross River State's Benedict Ayade, and Zamfara State's Bello Muhammad Matawalle—in 2020 and 2021 along with dozens of state and federal lawmakers; however, political moves around party primaries in 2022 erased most of these legislative gains due to members leaving the APC.

However, the APC faced more internal leadership crises as disputes over the leadership of National Chairman Adams Oshiomhole dominated party internal affairs in 2019 and 2020 with Oshiomhole feuding with several APC governors during the 2019 campaign and its aftermath. Tensions rose in November 2019 when the state APC in Edo State—Oshiomhole's home state—suspended his party membership and argued that a suspended member could not serve in a leadership position. Eventually litigation decided the dispute, with a High Court suspending in Oshiomhole as Chairman in March 2020 based on his membership suspension. After the suspension was affirmed during the appeal process, there was a brief June 2020 power struggle between two members of the National Working Committee—Victor Gaidom and Abiola Ajimobi—before the party National Executive Council opted to dissolve the National Working Committee and set up the Caretaker/Extraordinary Convention Planning Committee (CECPC). The CECPC was led by former Party Secretary and incumbent Governor of Yobe State Mai Mala Buni and former Senator John James Akpan Udo-Edehe becoming National Secretary. The caretaker committee was meant to serve for a few months before a national convention was held with elections for permanent leadership but the committee's term was extended until early 2022 despite regular lawsuits and internal attempts to remove the CECPC. Despite continued party infighting that plagued October 2021 state congresses and an attempted "palace coup" to replace Buni with Governor of Niger State Abubakar Sani Bello in while Buni was abroad for medical attention, the national convention was finally held on 26 March 2022. The convention mainly used the contentious "consensus" method of electing officials with allegations that Buhari and governors had imposed candidates on the party; in the convention, Senator Abdullahi Adamu became National Chairman and former Iyiola Omisore became National Secretary while Senator Abubakar Kyari became Deputy National Chairman (North) and Emma Eneukwu became Deputy National Chairman (South).

=== 2023 elections ===
Despite a contentious campaign period rife with allegations of misconduct and vote-buying, the APC presidential primary on 7 and 8 June 2022 was held peacefully with former Governor of Lagos State Bola Tinubu defeating Rotimi Amaechi, Yemi Osinbajo, and eleven other candidates. However, the party ticket became immensely controversial the next month when Tinubu selected Kashim Shettima—a Senator and former Governor of Borno State—as the APC vice presidential nominee; the selection created a Muslim-Muslim ticket, violating an unwritten convention against same religion tickets to ensure representative diversity.

In the 2023 elections, the party retained the presidency as Tinubu defeated Atiku Abubakar of the People's Democratic Party and Peter Obi of the Labour Party, albeit with a significantly reduced vote share compared to 2019. In the legislative elections, the party preserved its majorities in both chambers of the National Assembly, though with notable seat losses amid gains by smaller parties. At the state level, the APC recorded mixed results—losing three governorships while gaining two governorships—ultimately emerging with a slight net decline in the number of states it controlled, even as it maintained a plurality of governorships and state Houses of Assembly nationwide.

=== Off-cycle elections, 2024–2026 ===
In Edo State governorship election held on 21 September 2024, the candidate for APC, Monday Okpebholo, was declared the winner with 291,667 votes. Asue Ighodalo of the Peoples Democratic Party received 247,274 votes, while Olumide Akpata of the Labour Party received 22,763 votes. The PDP disputed the result and announced that it would challenge it.

In the Ondo State governorship election held on 16 November 2024, the incumbent governor and candidate for APC, Lucky Aiyedatiwa, was elected with 366,781 votes. His closest opponent, Agboola Ajayi of the PDP, received 117,845 votes. Aiyedatiwa won all 18 local government areas in the state.

In the Anambra State governorship election held on 8 November 2025, APC governorship candidate Nicholas Ukachukwu received 99,445 votes and finished second. The incumbent governor, Charles Chukwuma Soludo of the All Progressives Grand Alliance was re-elected with 422,664 votes and won all 21 LGAs.

In the Ekiti State governorship election held on 20 June 2026, and the incumbent APC governor, Biodun Oyebanji was re-elected with 319,224 votes. His closest opponent, Oluwole Oluyede of the People’s Democratic Party, received 40,543 votes.

The APC was unsuccessful in the Osun State governorship election held on 15 August 2026. Its governorship candidate, Bola Oyebamiji, received 444,815 votes and finished second. The incumbent governor Ademola Adeleke of the Accord Party was re-elected with 511,067 votes.

=== 2027 elections ===
In May 2025, the All Progressive Congress endorsed President Bola Tinubu for a second term in the 2027 presidential election. Tinubu subsequently secured the party’s presidential nomination in May 2026.

The Independent National Electoral Commission scheduled the 2027 presidential and National Assembly elections for 16 January 2027, followed by the governorship and state House of Assembly elections on 6 February.

Governorship elections are scheduled to take place in 28 states on 6 February 2027. No governorship elections will be held in Anambra, Bayelsa, Edo, Ekiti, Imo, Kogi, Ondo and Osun states because their governorship elections are conducted outside the general election cycle.

== Political ideology ==
=== Economic issues ===
The APC is generally considered to be a party that favours controlled market economic policies, and a strong and active role for government regulation. A substantial number of its political leaders are followers of or politicians who subscribe to the social democratic political philosophy of Obafemi Awolowo and the socialist and anti-class views of Aminu Kano. Moreover, the majority of the APC's base of political support is in southwestern Nigeria and Northern Nigeria, which are dominated by the Yoruba and the Hausa-Fulani, respectively.

In December 2014, the APC was admitted as a consultative member of Socialist International.

The APC rejected accusations of attempting to establish a one-party state under President Bola Tinubu. Party officials stated that recent political defections were voluntary and driven by support for the administration's policies, reaffirming their commitment to Nigeria's multiparty democracy.

=== Social issues ===
The party has taken generally conservative stances on social issues. On matters of ethnic and religious diversity, the party publicly advocates national unity, though critics argue that some of its actions — such as the prevalence of bigotry in APC campaigning and the Muslim–Muslim presidential ticket in 2023 — heighten tensions and undermine intercommunal harmony.

On gender policy, APC lawmakers have comprised the bulk of legislative opposition to proposals to establish gender equality in the 2010s and 2020s citing legal, socio-cultural, and religious grounds. The party nominally endorses increased economic and political opportunities for women, but it has been criticized for rejecting legislation and breaking promises to increase women's representation in legislatures and cabinet.

== Election results ==
=== Presidential elections ===
Year	Party candidate	Running mate	Votes	%	Result
2015	Muhammadu Buhari	Yemi Osinbajo	15,424,921	53.96%	Elected ✓
2019	Muhammadu Buhari	Yemi Osinbajo	15,191,847	55.60%	Elected ✓
2023	Bola Tinubu	Kashim Shettima	8,794,726	36.61%	Elected ✓

=== House of Representatives and Senate elections ===
Election	House of Representatives					Senate				
Election	Votes	%	Seats	+/–	Position	Votes	%	Seats	+/–	Position
2015			212 / 360		▲1st			60 / 109	▲19	▲1st
2019	12,931,229	47.38%	217 / 360	▲7	1st	13,392,474	48.31%	64 / 109	▲4	1st
2023			176 / 360	▼41	1st			59 / 109	▼5	1st

=== Gubernatorial elections ===
Year	Number of states won
2015	26 / 36
2019	20 / 36

== See also ==
- List of state parties of the All Progressives Congress
