= 2022 Nigerian elections =

- House of Representatives elections

3 of the 360 seats
	Majority party	Minority party
Party	APC	PDP
Last election	202	128
Seats up	1	2
- Gubernatorial elections

2 governorships
	Majority party	Minority party	Third party
Party	APC	PDP	APGA
Seats before	22	13	1
Seats after	21	14	1
Seat change	▼1	▲1	0
Popular vote	562,084	470,828	376
Percentage	48.61%	40.72%	0.03%
Seats up	2	0	0
Seats won	1	1	0

Elections were held throughout Nigeria throughout 2022. During the year, the governors of Ekiti and Osun states were elected on 18 June and 16 July, respectively. Additionally, there were also elections to fill vacant seats in the House of Representatives and state houses of assembly along with local elections in Adamawa State, Benue State, Edo State, Enugu State, the Federal Capital Territory, Imo State, Katsina State, and Kebbi State.

== Federal elections ==
=== National Assembly elections ===
==== House of Representatives elections ====
At least three by-elections were held in 2022 to fill vacancies in the House of Representatives:

Constituency	Incumbent		Election	
Constituency	Member	Party	Results	Candidates
Akure North/Akure South	Adedayo Omolafe	PDP	Incumbent died 16 August 2021; New member elected on 26 February; APC gain	✓ Mayokun Lawson-Alade (APC) 51.4%; Olumuyiwa Adu (PDP) 47.1%
Jos North/Bassa	Haruna Maitala	APC	Incumbent died 2 April 2021; New member elected on 26 February; PRP gain after court decision	~~Musa Agah Avia (PDP) 37.7%~~; ✓ Muhammad Adamu Alkali (PRP) 35.3%; Joseph Abbey Aku (APC) 24.4%
Ogoja/Yala	Agom Jarigbe	PDP	Incumbent resigned 22 September 2021; New member elected on 26 February; APC gain	✓ Jude Ngaji (APC) 52.0%; Mike Usibe (PDP) 47.0%

== State elections ==
=== Gubernatorial elections ===
State	Incumbent			Results	
State	Incumbent	Party	First elected	Status	Candidates
Ekiti	Kayode Fayemi	APC	2018 (Note: Fayemi also served as governor from 2010 to 2014)	Incumbent term-limited New governor elected APC hold	Abiodun Oyebanji (APC) 53.16%; Olusegun Oni (SDP) 23.37%; Bisi Kolawole (PDP) 19.17%
Osun	Gboyega Oyetola	APC	2018	Incumbent lost re-election New governor elected PDP gain	Ademola Adeleke (PDP) 50.14%; Gboyega Oyetola (APC) 46.62%

=== House of Assembly elections ===
At least six by-elections will be held in 2022 to fill vacancies in state houses of assembly in at least six different states:

- Cross River State
  - Akpabuyo State Constituency: On 26 October 2021, member for Akpabuyo Adedayo Omolafe (PDP) died from an undisclosed protracted illness. INEC set the by-election date for 26 February alongside five other by-elections. The seat was held for the PDP by Effiom Ekeng Edet who defeated his nearest opponent, the APC's Bassey Effiom, by 503 votes.
- Ekiti State
  - Ekiti East I State Constituency: On January 31, 2021, member for Ekiti East I Juwa Adegbuyi (APC) died from an undisclosed illness. INEC originally set the date for the by-election for 20 March 2021; however, on the by-election date, multiple reports of violence and ballot snatching including the murder of 3 people at a polling station led INEC to suspend and postpone the by-election indefinitely.
- Imo State
  - Ngor Okpala State Constituency: On 26 October 2021, the seat of Ngor Okpala was declared vacant by Speaker Kennedy Ibeh after member Tochi Okere (PDP) did not attend the constitutionally-required amount of legislative meetings. INEC set the by-election date for 26 February alongside five other by-elections.
- Kaduna State
  - Giwa West State Constituency: On 15 December 2021, the member for Giwa West, Rilwanu Aminu Gadagau (APC), was killed in a bandit attack along the Kaduna-Zaria highway.
- Plateau State
  - Pankshin South State Constituency: On 28 November 2021, member for Pankshin South, Henry Longs (APC), died from complications during a leg operation. INEC set the by-election date for 26 February alongside five other by-elections. The seat was held for the APC by Ezra Dakup who defeated his nearest opponent, Peter Da'an Dasat of the PDP, by 113 votes.
- Zamfara State
  - Gusau East State Constituency: On 29 January 2022, the member for Gusau East, Ibrahim Na’iddah, died from a "protracted illness."
  - Shinkafi State Constituency: On 29 June 2021, the member for Shinkafi, Muhammad Ahmad (APC), was killed in a bandit attack along the Sheme-Funtua highway in Katsina State.

== Local elections ==
At least ten statewide local elections were held in 2022:

- Adamawa: The Adamawa State Independent Electoral Commission held local elections on 9 April. The PDP won all 21 chairmanships and 226 councillorship seats.
- Benue: The Benue State Independent Electoral Commission initially called local elections for 7 May; however, the Commission later pushed the elections forward to 30 April. The PDP won all 23 chairmanships and 276 councillorship seats.
- Ebonyi: The Ebonyi State Independent Electoral Commission held local elections on 30 July. The APC won all 13 chairmanships and 171 councillorship seats.
- Edo: The Edo State Independent Electoral Commission initially called local elections for 19 April; however, a court ruled against the conduct of the elections and the EDSIEC postponed the election.
- Enugu: The Enugu State Independent Electoral Commission held local elections on 23 February. The PDP won all 17 chairmanships and 260 councillorship seats.
- Federal Capital Territory: The federal Independent National Electoral Commission held FCT local elections on 12 February. Of the six area council chairmanships, three went to the APC and PDP each while of the 62 councillorships, 44 went to the PDP and 18 were won by the APC.
- Imo: The Imo State Independent Electoral Commission called local elections for 12 March. However, this date was pushed back to 25 March before being suspended indefinitely due to security concerns.
- Katsina: The Katsina State Independent Electoral Commission held local elections on 11 April. Initial results showed the APC won all 31 declared chairmanships and 328 declared councillorship seats but results from three LGA were unavailable.
- Kebbi: The Kebbi State Independent Electoral Commission held local elections on 5 February. The APC won all 21 chairmanship and 225 councillorship seats.
- Osun: The Osun State Independent Electoral Commission called local elections for 15 October.
