= 2022 in Nigeria =

- Decades: 2000s; 2010s; 2020s
- See also: Other events of 2022; Timeline of Nigerian history

Events in the year 2022 in Nigeria.

== Incumbents ==
=== Federal government ===
- President: Muhammadu Buhari (APC)
- Vice President: Yemi Osinbajo (APC)
- Senate President: Ahmed Lawan (APC)
- House Speaker: Femi Gbajabiamila (APC)
- Chief Justice: Ibrahim Tanko Muhammad (Until 27 June); Olukayode Ariwoola (Starting 27 June)

=== Governors ===
- Abia State: Okezie Ikpeazu (PDP)
- Adamawa State: Ahmadu Umaru Fintiri PDP
- Akwa Ibom State: Udom Gabriel Emmanuel PDP
- Anambra State: Willie Obiano (APGA) (Until 17 March); Charles Chukwuma Soludo (APGA) (Starting 17 March)
- Bauchi State: Bala Muhammed PDP
- Bayelsa State: Duoye Diri PDP
- Benue State: Samuel Ortom PDP
- Borno State: BabaGana Umara APC
- Cross River State: Benedict Ayade PDP
- Delta State: Ifeanyi Okowa PDP
- Ebonyi State: Dave Umahi PDP
- Edo State: Godwin Obaseki APC
- Ekiti State: Kayode Fayemi (APC) (Until 16 October); Biodun Oyebanji (APC) (Starting 16 October)
- Enugu State: Ifeanyi Ugwuanyi PDP
- Gombe State: Muhammad Inuwa Yahaya APC
- Imo State: Hope Uzodinma APC
- Jigawa State: Badaru Abubakar APC
- Kaduna State: Nasir Ahmad el-Rufai APC
- Kano State: Abdullahi Umar Ganduje APC
- Katsina State: Aminu Bello Masari APC
- Kebbi State: Abubakar Atiku Bagudu APC
- Kogi State: Yahaya Bello APC
- Kwara State: AbdulRahman AbdulRasaq APC
- Lagos State: Babajide Sanwo-Olu APC
- Nasarawa State: Abdullahi Sule APC
- Niger State: Abubakar Sani Bello APC
- Ogun State: Dapo Abiodun APC
- Ondo State: Oluwarotimi Odunayo Akeredolu APC
- Osun State: Adegboyega Oyetola (APC) (Until 27 November); Ademola Adeleke (PDP) (Starting 27 November)
- Oyo State: Oluwaseyi Makinde PDP
- Plateau State: Simon Lalong APC
- Rivers State: Ezenwo Nyesom Wike PDP
- Sokoto State: Aminu Waziri Tambuwal PDP
- Taraba State: Arch. Darius Ishaku PDP
- Yobe State: Mai Mala Buni APC
- Zamfara State: Bello Matawalle PDP

== Events ==
Ongoing – 2022 Nigeria floods, Boko Haram insurgency, COVID-19 pandemic in Nigeria, Herder-farmer conflicts in Nigeria, Insurgency in Southeastern Nigeria, Nigerian bandit conflict

=== January ===
- 4–6 January – 2022 Zamfara massacres
- 14–15 January – Dankade massacre

=== February ===
- 5 February – 2022 Kebbi State local elections
- 10 February
  - Bandits raid the village of Rogoji, Bakura, Zamfara State, killing five people and causing a mass exodus from the town. The bandits were requested to do so by a woman whose son was killed by vigilantes.
  - Armed robbers raid a bullion van in Ibadan, Oyo State, killing six people, including two policemen.
- 12 February – 2022 Federal Capital Territory local elections
- 23 February – 2022 Enugu State local elections

=== March ===
- 8 March – March 2022 Kebbi massacres
- 12 March – 2022 Imo State local elections
- 28 March – Abuja–Kaduna train attack

=== April ===
- 9 April – 2022 Adamawa State local elections
- 10 April – 2022 Plateau State massacres
- 11 April – 2022 Katsina State local elections
- 19 April – 2022 Edo State local elections
- 22 April – 2022 Imo-Rivers explosion

=== May ===
- 7 May – 2022 Benue State local elections
- 12 May – Lynching of Deborah Yakubu
- 28 May – 2022 Port Harcourt stampede

=== June ===
- 5 June – Owo church attack

=== July ===
- 16 July
  - 2022 Ekiti State gubernatorial election
  - 2022 Osun State gubernatorial election

=== August ===
- 7 August – The world-record holder in the women's 100m hurdles, Tobi Amusan broke a 16-year record in that event at the 2022 Commonwealth Games.
- 31 August – One person is killed and six others are injured after a building collapse in Kano, Kano State.

=== September ===
- 5 September – Six people are killed after a building collapses in Lagos.
- 12 September – Five people are killed during an attack on a senator's convoy in Anambra.
- 21 September – Fulani herdsmen shoot and kill 14 civilians in Logo, Benue State.
- 24 September – Fifteen people are killed and many others are injured after armed bandits attacked a mosque in Zamfara.

=== October ===
- 5 October – Abuja–Kaduna train attack: The Nigerian military says it has secured the release of the last 23 passengers taken hostage in late March.
- 8 October – At least 76 people are killed after a boat carrying people fleeing floodwater capsizes in Anambra State.
- 17 October – The death toll from the ongoing floods across Nigeria, which started in early summer, increases to more than 600.
- 18 October – Multiple people are killed and 10 others are abducted after gunmen storm a hospital in Niger State.

=== November ===
- 8 November – Four people are killed and twelve others are injured by a bombing in Anambra State.
- 11 November – Twelve people are killed when a tank truck explodes in Ofu, Kogi State.

=== December ===
- 7 December – The Central Bank of Nigeria says it will limit individual cash withdrawals to 100,000 Nigerian naira (225 USD) per week to reduce counterfeiting and to discourage ransom payments to kidnappers.
- 20 December – Nigerian bandit conflict: At least 38 people are killed and several houses are torched during two attacks at two villages in Kagoro, Kaduna State.
- 29 December – Fourteen people are killed and 24 more injured after a drunk driver ploughed into crowds at the annual carnival parade in Calabar.

== Culture ==
=== January ===
- 1 January – Chief Daddy 2: Going for Broke released on Netflix

=== May ===
- 8 May – 8th Africa Magic Viewers' Choice Awards

== Deaths ==
- 1 January –
  - Paul Adegboyega Olawoore, Roman Catholic prelate, coadjutor bishop (2018–2019) and bishop (since 2019) of Ilorin.
  - Anthony Obi, 69, politician, military administrator of Osun State (1996–1998).
- 2 January – Saliu Adetunji, 93, traditional ruler, Olubadan of Ibadan (since 2016).
- 3 January – Bashir Tofa, 74, Nigerian politician, MP (1977–1979)
- 11 January – Ernest Shonekan, 9th Head of State.
- 29 January – Ibrahim Naʼiddah, 68, Nigerian politician, MLA from Zamfara State.
- 8 February – Abdulkadir Abubakar Rano, a major figure of the Nigeria Police Force.
- 8 April – Osinachi Nwachukwu, 42, gospel singer (cause undisclosed)
- 14 April – Orlando Julius, 79, Afrobeat saxophonist, singer, bandleader, and songwriter
- 22 April – Alaafin of Oyo, Lamidi Adeyemi III.
- 11 June – Amb Osayomore Joseph, 69, highlife pioneer
- 27 July – Oluwole Adegboro, 73, Nigerian politician from Ondo State.
- 25 November – Sammie Okposo, 51, Nigerian gospel singer
- 15 December – Ademola Rasaq Seriki, 63, Nigerian politician, MP (1998–1999).
- 17 December – Sunday Tuoyo, 84, Nigerian military officer and politician, governor of Ondo State (1978–1979).

== See also ==
- 2022 Nigerian elections
- 2022 Census of Nigeria
- 2022 in West Africa
- List of Nigerian films of 2022
