= Nigerian National Assembly delegation from Plateau =

Plateau State's delegation in Nigeria's National Assembly

The current Nigerian National Assembly delegation from Plateau consists of three Senators representing Plateau North, Plateau Central and Plateau South Senatorial Districts and eight Representatives representing Barkin Ladi/Riyom, Jos North/Bassa, Jos South/Jos East, Langtang North/Langtang South, Mangu/Bokkos, Mikang/Shendam/Qua'an-Pan, Pankshin/Kanke/Kanam and Wase constituencies. Prior to the evolution of the Fourth Nigerian Republic, (based on the 4th republican constitution [1999] as amended) there existed the 1st, 2nd and 3rd Republics.

== First Republic ==
The present-day Plateau State was in the First Nigerian Republic part of a much larger political entity that was an agglomeration of the present-day northern states as part of the entirety of the Northern Region of Nigeria. The Republic was a Federal Parliamentary Republic based on the Westminster system bequeathed Nigeria by Great Britain. Thus including it in this article will make it cumbersome and confusing for the reader. Successive dispensations however adopted a replica of the American federal presidential system where parliament was replaced by a National Assembly starting on 1 October 1963.

== Second Republic ==
=== 2nd Assembly (1979–1983) ===
Unsurprisingly, the Nigerian legislature was still coined parliament in the Second Nigerian Republic despite already being a presidential republic largely due to the then transitional nature of Nigerian democracy. There were 19 states at the time represented by 5 senators each and 449 representatives not evenly distributed amongst the states i.e a minimum of 10 and maximum of 46 represented a state at the time depending on their populations. Plateau had a total of 16 representatives spread across the state with a whopping 13 bearing the flag of the NPP.

Senators during the Second Nigerian Republic from Plateau StateMembers of the House of Representatives during the Second Nigerian Republic from Plateau State
Senator	Elected	Party	Constituency	Term
John Wash Pam (Deputy Senate President)	7 July 1979	NPP	Jos	1 October 1979 – 1 October 1983
Garba Matta	7 July 1979	NPP	Pankshin/Mangu/Kanam	1 October 1979 – 1 October 1983
Thomas Yepwi	7 July 1979	NPP	Keffi/Nassarawa	1 October 1979 – 1 October 1983
George Baba Hoomkwap	7 July 1979	NPN	Shendam	1 October 1979 – 1 October 1983
Muhammadu Musa Agwai	7 July 1979	NPN	Lafia/Akwanga/Awe	1 October 1979 – 1 October 1983
Member	Elected	Party	Constituency	Term
Inuwa Ali	7 July 1979	NPP	Jos North	1 October 1979 – 1 October 1983
M. S. Aliyu	7 July 1979	NPP	Nassarawa	1 October 1979 – 1 October 1983
Morgan Chokwe	7 July 1979	NPP	Bassa	1 October 1979 – 1 October 1983
D. D. Dafuan	7 July 1979	NPP	Shendam West	1 October 1979 – 1 October 1983
S. F. Dalyop	7 July 1979	NPP	Jos South	1 October 1979 – 1 October 1983
P. C. Deme	7 July 1979	NPP	Barkin-Ladi	1 October 1979 – 1 October 1983
Ambrose Gapsuk	7 July 1979	NPP	Shendam East	1 October 1979 – 1 October 1983
Christopher K. Gutus	7 July 1979	NPP	Pankshin	1 October 1979 – 1 October 1983
Yakubu Hussaini	7 July 1979	NPP	Lafia	1 October 1979 – 1 October 1983
Amos Idakula	7 July 1979	NPP	Keffi	1 October 1979 – 1 October 1983
Ioritim Ityo	7 July 1979	NPP	Awe	1 October 1979 – 1 October 1983
John L. Laven	7 July 1979	NPP	Langtang	1 October 1979 – 1 October 1983
J. Yamu Marki	7 July 1979	NPP	Akwanga	1 October 1979 – 1 October 1983
Mohammed D. Shuaibu	7 July 1979	NPP	Kanam	1 October 1979 – 1 October 1983
Felix M. Wetkum	7 July 1979	NPP	Mangu	1 October 1979 – 1 October 1983
Abdulkadir Zakari	7 July 1979	NPP	Wase	1 October 1979 – 1 October 1983

== Third Republic ==
=== 3rd Assembly (1992–1993) ===
In the Third Nigerian Republic, there were the senatorial districts of Plateau North, Plateau East and Plateau West. The House of Representatives constituencies consisted of the individual Local Government Areas of the state qualified at that time as Federal constituencies.

Senators during the Third Nigerian Republic from Plateau StateMembers of the House of Representatives during the Third Nigerian Republic from Plateau State
Image	Senator	Elected	Party	Constituency	Term
	Venmak Kurnap Dangin	4 July 1992	SDP	Plateau East	5 December 1992 – 17 November 1993
	Jacon Adankana Isandu	4 July 1992	SDP	Plateau North	5 December 1992 – 17 November 1993
	Joseph K. Umaru	4 July 1992	SDP	Plateau West	5 December 1992 – 17 November 1993
Image	Member	Elected	Party	Constituency	Term
	Abdullahi Mohammed Kani Wuse	4 July 1992	SDP	Awe	5 December 1992 – 17 November 1993
	Dongs Duncil Tyem	4 July 1992	SDP	Langtang South	5 December 1992 – 17 November 1993
	James Oga Ajason Ajamia	4 July 1992	SDP	Karu	5 December 1992 – 17 November 1993
	Johnson J. Zogore	4 July 1992	SDP	Bassa	5 December 1992 – 17 November 1993
	Yakubu Usman Shehu	4 July 1992	SDP	Kanam	5 December 1992 – 17 November 1993
	Hassan Danladi	4 July 1992	SDP	Keffi	5 December 1992 – 17 November 1993
	Dashe Amos Silas	4 July 1992	SDP	Langtang North	5 December 1992 – 17 November 1993
	Gobum Benka Suwa	4 July 1992	SDP	Pankshin	5 December 1992 – 17 November 1993
	Michael Bukwal	4 July 1992	SDP	Shendam	5 December 1992 – 17 November 1993
	James Fyakfu Bakfur	4 July 1992	SDP	Mangu	5 December 1992 – 17 November 1993
	Ibrahim Idi Waziri	4 July 1992	NRC	Wase	5 December 1992 – 17 November 1993
	Damian Daloeng	4 July 1992	SDP	Qua'an-Pan	5 December 1992 – 17 November 1993
	Musa Sanda	4 July 1992	SDP	Lafia	5 December 1992 – 17 November 1993
	Davou S. B. Gyel	4 July 1992	SDP	Jos South	5 December 1992 – 17 November 1993
	Amina Mohammed Aliyu	4 July 1992	SDP	Akwanga	5 December 1992 – 17 November 1993
James_Vwi_portrait	James Vwi	4 July 1992	SDP	Barkin Ladi	5 December 1992 – 17 November 1993
	Danjuma Alkali	4 July 1992	NRC	Toto	5 December 1992 – 17 November 1993
	Abe A. Usman	4 July 1992	SDP	Obi	5 December 1992 – 17 November 1993
	Alfred Iliya Sagai	4 July 1992	SDP	Bokkos	5 December 1992 – 17 November 1993
	Ogah Alex Ewolo	4 July 1992	SDP	Nassarawa	5 December 1992 – 17 November 1993
	Abims A. Ebyei	4 July 1992	SDP	Nassarawa Eggon	5 December 1992 – 17 November 1993
	Aminu Agwom Zang	4 July 1992	SDP	Jos North	5 December 1992 – 17 November 1993
	Umaru Salihu Ogah	4 July 1992	NRC	Doma	5 December 1992 – 17 November 1993

Following the chaos of the botched IBB–Shonekan transition and the eventual usurping of power by Sani Abacha the Plateau political map was to undergo the following changes on 1 October 1996:

- The creation of Nassarawa State out of Plateau State which will comprise most entities that made up Plateau West Senatorial Constituency.
- The creation of the additional Local Government Areas of Riyom from Barkin Ladi, Jos East from Jos North, Kanke from Pankshin and Mikang in the new Plateau State.

== Fourth Republic ==
=== 4th Assembly (1999–2003) ===
Senators during the Fourth Assembly from Plateau StateMembers of the House of Representatives during the Fourth Assembly from Plateau State
Senator	Elected	Party	Constituency	Term
Davou Zang	20 February 1999	PDP	Plateau North	29 May 1999 – 3 June 2003
Ibrahim Mantu	20 February 1999	PDP	Plateau Central	29 May 1999 – 3 June 2003
Silas Janfa	20 February 1999	PDP	Plateau South	29 May 1999 – 3 June 2003
Member	Elected	Party	Constituency	Term
Song Isa Chungwom	20 February 1999	PDP	Barkin Ladi/Riyom	29 May 1999 – 3 June 2003
Adeh Lumumba Dah	20 February 1999	PDP	Jos North/Bassa	29 May 1999 – 3 June 2003
Daniel Sunday Dung	20 February 1999	PDP	Jos South/Jos East	29 May 1999 – 3 June 2003
Victor Lar	20 February 1999	PDP	Langtang North/Langtang South	29 May 1999 – 3 June 2003
Yilkes Barminas Ali	20 February 1999	PDP	Mangu/Bokkos	29 May 1999 – 3 June 2003
Damulak Jafaru Muhammadu	20 February 1999	PDP	Mikang/Shendam/Qua'an-Pan	29 May 1999 – 3 June 2003
Binuwai Josiah Gobum	20 February 1999	PDP	Pankshin/Kanke/Kanam	29 May 1999 – 3 June 2003
Yero Ibrahim Bello	20 February 1999	PDP	Wase	29 May 1999 – 3 June 2003

=== 5th Assembly (2003–2007) ===
Senators during the Fifth Assembly from Plateau StateMembers of the House of Representatives during the Fifth Assembly from Plateau State
Senator	Elected	Party	Constituency	Term
Timothy Adudu	12 April 2003	ANPP	Plateau North	3 June 2003 – 5 June 2007
Ibrahim Mantu (Deputy Senate President)	12 April 2003	PDP	Plateau Central	3 June 2003 – 5 June 2007
Cosmos Niagwan	12 April 2003	PDP	Plateau South	3 June 2003 – 5 June 2007
Member	Elected	Party	Constituency	Term
Gyang Dalyop Dantong	12 April 2003	ANPP	Barkin Ladi/Riyom	3 June 2003 – 5 June 2007
Hassan Shehu Saleh	12 April 2003	ANPP	Jos North/Bassa	3 June 2003 – 5 June 2007
Gabriel Y. Bwan Fom	12 April 2003	ANPP	Jos South/Jos East	3 June 2003 – 5 June 2007
Victor Lar	12 April 2003	ANPP	Langtang North/Langtang South	3 June 2003 – 5 June 2007
Adamu Lohor	12 April 2003	PDP	Mangu/Bokkos	3 June 2003 – 5 June 2007
Damulak Jafaru Muhammadu	12 April 2003	PDP	Mikang/Shendam/Qua'an-Pan	3 June 2003 – 5 June 2007
Musa Wuyep L.	12 April 2003	PDP	Pankshin/Kanke/Kanam	3 June 2003 – 5 June 2007
Yero Ibrahim Bello	12 April 2003	PDP	Wase	3 June 2003 – 5 June 2007

=== 6th Assembly (2007–2011) ===
Senators during the Sixth Assembly from Plateau StateMembers of the House of Representatives during the Sixth Assembly from Plateau State
Senator	Elected	Party	Constituency	Term
Gyang Dalyop Dantong	21 April 2007	PDP	Plateau North	5 June 2007 – 6 June 2011
Satty Davies Gogwim	21 April 2007	AC	Plateau Central	5 June 2007 – 6 June 2011
John Nanzip Shagaya	21 April 2007	PDP	Plateau South	5 June 2007 – 6 June 2011
Member	Elected	Party	Constituency	Term
Martha H. Bodunrin	21 April 2007	PDP	Barkin Ladi/Riyom	5 June 2007 – 6 June 2011
Samaila A. Mohammed	21 April 2007	ANPP	Jos North/ Bassa	5 June 2007 – 6 June 2011
Bitrus B. Kaze	21 April 2007	PDP	Jos South/Jos East	5 June 2007 – 6 June 2011
Beni Lar	21 April 2007	PDP	Langtang North/Langtang South	5 June 2007 – 6 June 2011
James Yakwen Ayuba	21 April 2007	PDP	Mangu/Bokkos	5 June 2007 – 6 June 2011
George E. Daika	21 April 2007	PDP	Mikang/Shendam/Qua'an-Pan	5 June 2007 – 6 June 2011
Leonard W. W. Dilkon	21 April 2007	PDP	Pankshin/Kanke/Kanam	5 June 2007 – 6 June 2011
Ahmed Idris Wase	21 April 2007	AC	Wase	5 June 2007 – 6 June 2011

=== 7th Assembly (2011–2015) ===
Senators during the Seventh Assembly from Plateau StateMembers of the House of Representatives during the Seventh Assembly from Plateau State
Senator	Elected	Party	Constituency	Term
Gyang Dalyop Dantong† (2011–2012)	9 April 2011	PDP	Plateau North	6 June 2011 – 6 June 2015 (passed in 2012 before completing term)
Gyang Pwajok (2012–2015)	6 October 2012	PDP	Plateau North	completed Dantong's term after 6 October 2012 senatorial by-election
Joshua Dariye	9 April 2011	LP	Plateau Central	6 June 2011 – 6 June 2015
Victor Lar	9 April 2011	PDP	Plateau South	6 June 2011 – 6 June 2015
Member	Elected	Party	Constituency	Term
Simon Mwadkwon	9 April 2011	PDP	Barkin Ladi/Riyom	6 June 2011 – 6 June 2015
Suleiman Yahaya Kwande	9 April 2011	DPP	Jos North/Bassa	6 June 2011 – 6 June 2015
Bitrus B. Kaze	9 April 2011	PDP	Jos South/Jos East	6 June 2011 – 6 June 2015
Beni Lar	9 April 2011	PDP	Langtang North/Langtang South	6 June 2011 – 6 June 2015
Jonathan Aminu	9 April 2011	PDP	Mangu/Bokkos	6 June 2011 – 6 June 2015
Innocent Tirsel	9 April 2011	PDP	Mikang/Shendam/Qua'an-Pan	6 June 2011 – 6 June 2015
Emmanuel Lokji Goar	9 April 2011	PDP	Pankshin/Kanke/Kanam	6 June 2011 – 6 June 2015
Ahmed Idris Wase	9 April 2011	–	Wase	6 June 2011 – 6 June 2015

=== 8th Assembly (2015–2019) ===
Senators during the Eighth Assembly from Plateau StateMembers of the House of Representatives during the Eighth Assembly from Plateau State
Senator	Elected	Party	Constituency	Term
Jonah Jang	28 March 2015	PDP	Plateau North	9 June 2015 – 9 June 2019
Joshua Dariye	28 March 2015	LP	Plateau Central	9 June 2015 – 9 June 2019
Jeremiah Useni	28 March 2015	PDP	Plateau South	9 June 2015 – 9 June 2019
Member	Elected	Party	Constituency	Term
Istifanus Gyang	28 March 2015	PDP	Barkin Ladi/Riyom	9 June 2015 – 9 June 2019
Suleiman Yahaya Kwande	28 March 2015	APC	Jos North/Bassa	9 June 2015 – 9 June 2019
Edward Pwajok	28 March 2015	PDP	Jos South/Jos East	9 June 2015 – 9 June 2019
Beni Lar	28 March 2015	PDP	Langtang North/Langtang South	9 June 2015 – 9 June 2019
Solomon Maren	28 March 2015	PDP	Mangu/Bokkos	9 June 2015 – 9 June 2019
Johnbull Tiemlong Shekarau	28 March 2015	PDP	Mikang/Shendam/Qua'an-Pan	9 June 2015 – 9 June 2019
Timothy Golu	28 March 2015	PDP	Pankshin/Kanke/Kanam	9 June 2015 – 9 June 2019
Ahmed Idris Wase	28 March 2015	APC	Wase	9 June 2015 – 9 June 2019

=== 9th Assembly (2019–2023) ===
Senators during the Ninth Assembly from Plateau StateMembers of the House of Representatives during the Ninth Assembly from Plateau State
Senator	Elected	Party	Constituency	Term
Istifanus Gyang	23 February 2019	PDP	Plateau North	11 June 2019 – 11 June 2023
Hezekiah Ayuba Dimka	23 February 2019	APC	Plateau Central	11 June 2019 – 11 June 2023
Ignatius Datong Longjan†	23 February 2019	APC	Plateau South	11 June 2019 till death (10 February 2020)
Nora Daduut	returned via by-election of 5 December 2020 following Logjan's passing	APC	Plateau South	15 December 2020 – 11 June 2023
Member	Elected	Party	Constituency	Term
Simon Mwadkwon	23 February 2019	PDP	Barkin Ladi/Riyom	11 June 2019 – 11 June 2023
Haruna Maitala†	23 February 2019	APC	Jos North/Bassa	(11 June 2019 – 2 April 2021)
Musa Agah Avia	returned via by election of after Maitala's passing	PDP	Jos North/Bassa	(10 March 2022 – 28 October 2022) election nullified
Muhammad Adamu Alkali	returned by court ruling that voided Avia's election	PRP	Jos North/Bassa	(14 November 2022 – 11 June 2023)
Dachung Musa Bagos	23 February 2019	PDP	Jos South/Jos East	11 June 2019 – 11 June 2023
Beni Lar	23 February 2019	PDP	Langtang North/Langtang South	11 June 2019 – 11 June 2023
Solomon Maren	23 February 2019	PDP	Mangu/Bokkos	11 June 2019 – 11 June 2023
Komsol Longgap	23 February 2019	APC	Mikang/Shendam/Qua'an-Pan	11 June 2019 – 11 June 2023
Yusuf Adamu Gagdi	23 February 2019	APC	Pankshin/Kanke/Kanam	11 June 2019 – 11 June 2023
Ahmed Idris Wase (Deputy Speaker)	23 February 2019	APC	Wase	11 June 2019 – 11 June 2023

=== 10th Assembly (2023–2027) ===
Senators during the Ninth Assembly from Plateau StateMembers of the House of Representatives during the Ninth Assembly from Plateau State
Senator	Elected	Party	Constituency	Term
Simon Davou Mwadkwon	25 February 2023 (served from 13 June until his election was voided by the Court of Appeal on 22 October 2023)	PDP	Plateau North	13 June 2023 – 13 June 2027
Pam Mwadkon Dachungyang	returned via by election of 3 February 2024	ADP	Plateau North	13 June 2023 – 13 June 2027
Diket Plang	25 February 2023	APC	Plateau Central	13 June 2023 – 13 June 2027
Napoleon Bali	25 February 2023	PDP	Plateau South	13 June 2023 – 13 June 2027
Simon Lalong	returned via Appeal Court ruling of 7 November 2023 and assumed office on 20 December 2023	APC	Plateau South	13 June 2023 – 13 June 2027
Member	Elected	Party	Constituency	Term
Peter Gyendeng	25 February 2023	PDP	Barkin Ladi/Riyom	13 June 2023 – 13 June 2027
Musa Agah Avia	25 February 2023	PDP	Jos North/Bassa	13 June 2023 – 13 June 2027
Dachung Musa Bagos	25 February 2023	PDP	Jos South/Jos East	13 June 2023 – 13 June 2027
Beni Lar	25 February 2023	PDP	Langtang North/Langtang South	13 June 2023 – 13 June 2027
Ishaya David Lalu	25 February 2023	PDP	Mangu/Bokkos	13 June 2023 – 13 June 2027
Isaac Kyale Kwalu	25 February 2023	APC	Mikang/Shendam/Qua'an-Pan	13 June 2023 – 13 June 2027
Yusuf Adamu Gagdi	25 February 2023	APC	Pankshin/Kanke/Kanam	13 June 2023 – 13 June 2027
Ahmed Idris Wase	25 February 2023	APC	Wase	13 June 2023 – 13 June 2027
