= 2022 Nigerian state legislative elections =

2022 by-elections in Nigeria to fill legislative vacancies

- Various dates

7 of the 991 seats
	Majority party	Minority party
Party	All Progressives Congress	Peoples Democratic Party
Seats up	5	2

The 2022 Nigerian state legislative elections are called to fill vacant seats in state Houses of Assembly.

== Background ==
The 991 members of the 36 state Houses of Assembly are elected from single-seat constituencies using first-past-the-post voting; when vacancies occur, by-elections (or bye-elections) are called, scheduled, and administered by the Independent National Electoral Commission. New elections are also called if the general election was annulled by a court or election tribunal with these elections being referred to as supplementary elections if the election is only held in certain polling units and as rerun elections if the election held throughout the entire constituency.

== By-elections ==
=== Cross River State ===
==== Akpabuyo State Constituency by-election ====
Candidates' vote share
1. Effiom Ekeng Edet (PDP) (51.9%)
2. Bassey Effiom (APC) (47.4%)
3. Okon Eyo Etim (LP) (0.67%)

On 26 October 2021, member for Akpabuyo Elizabeth Edem Ironbar (PDP) died from an undisclosed protracted illness. In December 2021, INEC stated its intent to use the Bimodal Voter Accreditation System (BVAS) technology for the by-election along with having polling unit workers upload results directly to the INEC results portal on Election Day. In January, INEC set the date for the by-election for 26 February alongside five other by-elections with party primaries taking place between 26 January and 5 February.

The APC nominated Bassey Effiom while Effiom Ekeng Edet was nominated by the PDP. In the days before the election, observers noted a contentious atmosphere as the two major parties traded accusations of planned manipulation and fears of violence rose. Both parties strove to win the election as it (along with the Ogoja/Yala Federal Constituency by-election) was one of the first elections in Cross River State since Governor Benedict Ayade defected to the APC in May 2021 and thus a powerful signal for the path the state is taking ahead of the 2023 elections.

On Election Day, voting was conducted peacefully; later, announced results showed the PDP's Effiom Ekeng Edet winning narrowly over the APC's Bassey Effiom by just over 500 votes. Almost immediately, the APC rejected the declared results and stated its intention to challenge the election.

2022 Akpabuyo State Constituency by-election
Party	Candidate	Votes	%
PDP	Effiom Ekeng Edet	5,866	51.89%
APC	Bassey Effiom	5,363	47.44%
LP	Okon Eyo Etim	76	0.67%
Total votes		11,305	100.0%
Turnout		11,670	20.78%

=== Ekiti State ===
==== Ekiti East I State Constituency by-election ====
On 31 January 2021, member for Ekiti East I Juwa Adegbuyi (APC) died from an undisclosed illness. INEC originally set the date for the by-election for 20 March 2021 with party primaries taking place between 26 February and 3 March. However, on the by-election date, multiple reports of violence and ballot snatching including the murder of 3 people at a polling station in Omuo where Senator Abiodun Olujimi was observing voting led INEC to suspend and postpone the by-election indefinitely. In December 2021, INEC stated its intent to use the Bimodal Voter Accreditation System (BVAS) technology for the by-election along with having polling unit workers upload results directly to the INEC results portal on Election Day. INEC Chairman Mahmud Yakubu also stated that the commission was planning on holding the by-election alongside the Ekiti State gubernatorial election, setting the new date for 18 June 2022.

Candidates' vote share
1. Abraham Fatoba (APC) (61.8%)
2. Akintunde Adeyemi Adeniran (PDP) (36.4%)
3. Other candidates (1.84%)

On Election Day, Abraham Fatoba–the All Progressives Congress' nominee–won with just under 62% of the total vote. Coupled with an APC win in the gubernatorial election, the result was seen as a symbolic victory for the state party. Fatoba was sworn in 28 June, returning the Assembly to full membership for the first time since January 2021.

2022 Ekiti East I State Constituency by-election
Party	Candidate	Votes	%
APC	Abraham Fatoba	5,870	61.81%
PDP	Akintunde Adeyemi Adeniran	3,452	36.35%
YPP	Idowu Ebenezer Alao	108	1.14%
APGA	Ilesanmi Magret	43	0.45%
AA	Olayinka Christiana Oluwayemisi	24	0.25%
Total votes		9,497	100.00%
Invalid or blank votes		244	N/A
Turnout		9,741	39.03%

=== Imo State ===
==== Ngor Okpala State Constituency by-election ====
Candidates' vote share
1. Blyden Amajirionwu (APC) (53.5%)
2. Jeff Emeka Nwachukwu (PDP) (40.9%)
3. Other candidates (5.56%)

On 26 October 2021, the seat of Ngor Okpala was declared vacant by Speaker Kennedy Ibeh after member Tochi Okere (PDP) did not attend the constitutionally-required amount of legislative meetings. In January, INEC set the date for the by-election for 26 February alongside five other by-elections with party primaries taking place between 26 January and 5 February.

Analysts viewed the by-election as a key litmus test before the 2024 gubernatorial election as the PDP, which is seeking to retain the seat as its most major Imo figure and former Governor Emeka Ihedioha used to represent the area in the House of Representatives, and the APC, which is seeking to gain the seat and challenge PDP dominance in the area. It was also noted that APGA also was a major force in the area and wanted to reassert its relevance in Imo State ahead of the 2023 elections. In the days before the by-election, the three parties exchanged jabs while INEC affirmed its readiness to conduct the election.

However, on Election Day, a large number of INEC staff were kidnapped and the election was riddled by vote buying. Despite the incidents, the APC's Blyden Amajirionwu was declared winner as the PDP and civil groups called for the election's nullification.

2022 Ngor Okpala State Constituency by-election
Party	Candidate	Votes	%
APC	Blyden Amajirionwu	9,248	53.52%
PDP	Jeff Emeka Nwachukwu	7,071	40.92%
APGA	Christopher Nwaiwu	501	2.9%
ADC	Chinonso Ihechukwukara Okechukwu	133	0.07%
ADP	Maurice O. Eke	124	0.07%
SDP	Diala O. Damian	107	0.06%
LP	Alvan Ahaoti Opara	43	0.02%
ZLP	Eletu C. Kenneth	18	0.008%
NRM	Joy Udechukwu Nze	15	0.008%
APM	Chidiadi Ezebuchi Nwaiwu	14	0.008%
New Nigeria Peoples Party	Uche Cajetan Osigwe	6	0.003%
Total votes		17,280	100.0%
Turnout		17,280	18.3%

=== Kaduna State ===
==== Giwa West State Constituency by-election ====
On 15 December 2021, the member for Giwa West, Rilwanu Aminu Gadagau (APC), was killed in a bandit attack along the Kaduna-Zaria highway. Later in December 2021, INEC stated its intent to use the Bimodal Voter Accreditation System (BVAS) technology for the by-election along with having polling unit workers upload results directly to the INEC results portal on Election Day.

=== Plateau State ===
==== Pankshin South State Constituency by-election ====
Candidates' vote share
1. Ezra Dakup (APC) (49.5%)
2. Peter Dasat (PDP) (48.6%)
3. Other candidates (1.89%)

On 28 November 2021, member for Pankshin South, Henry Longs (APC), died from complications during a leg operation. In December 2021, INEC stated its intent to use the Bimodal Voter Accreditation System (BVAS) technology for the by-election along with having polling unit workers upload results directly to the INEC results portal on Election Day. In January, INEC set the date for the by-election for 26 February alongside five other by-elections with party primaries taking place between 26 January and 5 February.

In the days before the election, observers noted that both APC nominee Ezra Dakup and PDP nominee Peter Dasat appeared to have a clear chance at victory. When results were tabulated and announced, Dakup emerged the winner as he beat Dasat by just over 100 votes with a turnout of 24.39%. However, the PDP rejected the declared results and stated its intention to challenge the election.

2022 Pankshin South State Constituency by-election
Party	Candidate	Votes	%
APC	Ezra Dakup	6,328	49.50%
PDP	Peter Da'an Dasat	6,215	48.61%
ADP	Data Happiness Biplang Gideon	117	0.92%
YPP	Stanley Futsohot	58	0.45%
APP	Villong Monday Pofi	26	0.20%
New Nigeria Peoples Party	Endang Twamsen Ephraim	19	0.15%
SDP	James Michael Dakshak	15	0.12%
LP	Luhutyit Katshuwar	7	0.05%
Total votes		12,785	100.0%
Turnout		12,934	24.39%

=== Zamfara State ===
==== Gusau East State Constituency by-election ====
On 29 January 2022, the member for Gusau East, Ibrahim Na’iddah, died from a "protracted illness."

==== Shinkafi State Constituency by-election ====
On 29 June 2021, the member for Shinkafi, Muhammad Ahmad (APC), was killed in a bandit attack along the Sheme-Funtua highway in Katsina State. In December 2021, INEC stated its intent to use the Bimodal Voter Accreditation System (BVAS) technology for the by-election along with having polling unit workers upload results directly to the INEC results portal on Election Day.
