= 2022 Nigerian House of Representatives elections =

2022 House of Representatives by-elections in Nigeria to fill legislative vacancies

- Various dates

3 of the 360 seats in the House of Representatives
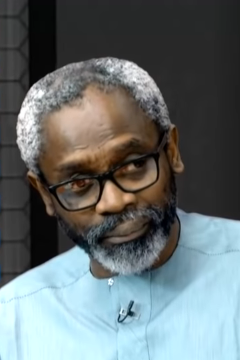
	Majority party	Minority party	Third party
		PRP	PDP
Leader	Femi Gbajabiamila	Falalu Bello	Ndudi Elumelu
Party	All Progressives Congress	PRP	Peoples Democratic Party
Leader's seat	Surulere I	N/A	Aniocha/Oshimili
Last election	203	2	125
Seats up	1	0	2
Seats won	2	1	0
Seat change	▲1	▲1	▼2

The 2022 Nigerian House of Representatives elections are called to fill vacant seats in the House of Representatives.

== Background ==
The 360 members of the House of Representatives are elected from single-seat constituencies using first-past-the-post voting; when vacancies occur, by-elections (or bye-elections) are called, scheduled, and administered by the Independent National Electoral Commission. New elections are also called if the general election was annulled by a court or election tribunal with these elections being referred to as supplementary elections if the election is only held in certain polling units and as rerun elections if the election held throughout the entire constituency.

== Elections ==
=== Summary ===
Constituency	Incumbent		Election	
Constituency	Member	Party	Results	Candidates
Akure North/Akure South	Adedayo Omolafe	PDP	Incumbent died 16 August 2021; New member elected on 26 February; APC gain	✓ Mayokun Lawson-Alade (APC) 51.4%; Olumuyiwa Adu (PDP) 47.1%
Jos North/Bassa	Haruna Maitala	APC	Incumbent died 2 April 2021; New member elected on 26 February; PRP gain after court decision	~~Musa Agah Avia (PDP) 37.7%~~; ✓ Muhammad Adamu Alkali (PRP) 35.3%; Joseph Abbey Aku (APC) 24.4%
Ogoja/Yala	Agom Jarigbe	PDP	Incumbent resigned 22 September 2021; New member elected on 26 February; APC gain	✓ Jude Ngaji (APC) 52.0%; Mike Usibe (PDP) 47.0%

=== Akure North/Akure South Federal Constituency by-election ===
On 16 August 2021, member for Akure North/Akure South Adedayo Omolafe (PDP) died from an undisclosed illness. In December 2021, INEC stated its intent to use the Bimodal Voter Accreditation System (BVAS) technology for the by-election along with having polling unit workers upload results directly to the INEC results portal on Election Day. In January, INEC set the date for the by-election for 26 February alongside five other by-elections, with party primaries taking place between 26 January and 5 February.

==== Primary elections ====
All Progressives Congress

The APC conducted an indirect primary on 1 February to nominate one of eight cleared candidates. Mayokun Lawson-Alade emerged as the nominee with over 43% of the vote, defeating former Ondo State Commissioner for Women Affairs Omowunmi Olatunji-Ohwovoriole and former Ondo State House of Assembly member Ademola Adegoroye.

APC primary results
Party	Candidate	Votes	%
APC	Mayokun Lawson-Alade	305	43.63%
APC	Omowunmi Olatunji-Ohwovoriole	196	28.04%
APC	Ademola Adegoroye	66	9.44%
APC	Ifedayo Abegunde	56	8.01%
APC	Dennis Fadairo	43	6.15%
APC	Abiodun Adesida	16	2.29%
APC	Sunday Olajide	13	1.86%
APC	Emmanuel Owoyemi	4	0.57%
Total votes		699	100.00%

People's Democratic Party

The PDP conducted an indirect primary on 3 February to nominate one of five cleared candidates. Olumuyiwa Adu emerged as the nominee with 42% of the vote, defeating former Ondo State House of Assembly member Kemisola Adesanya.

PDP primary results
Party	Candidate	Votes	%
PDP	Olumuyiwa Adu	98	42.24%
PDP	Kemisola Adesanya	70	30.17%
PDP	Babatunde Faro	40	17.24%
PDP	Dayo Awude	16	6.90%
PDP	Bayo Alarapon	8	3.45%
Total votes		232	100.00%

==== General election ====
Ahead of the by-election, the campaigns of both APC nominee Mayokun Lawson-Alade and PDP nominee Olumuyiwa Adu were optimistic, with Adu hoping to be buoyed by the late Omolafe's popularity in the constituency. Observers noted that despite the areas being a PDP stronghold, the race was shaping up to be competitive and close.

Security-wise, the pre-election situation was described as peacefully normal and that peace continued in most units on election day; however, there was a report of a voter being assaulted in one unit along with a number of vote buying accusations notably including a claim that Ondo State Deputy Governor Lucky Aiyedatiwa (APC) personally went to a unit to organize a vote buying operation. On the other hand, INEC was commended for the timely opening of units and functioning BVAS machines.

After the votes were counted, Lawson-Alade was announced as victor after results showed him defeating Adu by about 2,000 votes, 51% to 47%; the election had 14.41% turnout. Anonymous PDP sources blamed poor campaigning for the loss of the stronghold constituency while Ondo APC Chairman, Ade Adetimehin, cited the party's strategy and governing performance.

Candidates' vote share
1. Mayokun Lawson-Alade (APC) (51.4%)
2. Olumuyiwa Adu (PDP) (47.1%)
3. Other candidates (1.51%)

2022 Akure North/Akure South Federal Constituency by-election
Party	Candidate	Votes	%
APC	Mayokun Lawson-Alade	26,370	51.36%
PDP	Olumuyiwa Adu	24,201	47.13%
ADP	Felicia Oluwawemimo	465	0.91%
APP	Joseph Ajayi	125	0.24%
NRM	Johnson Olawusi	76	0.15%
SDP	Opawole Tajudeen	68	0.13%
A	Olawanle Oyemakinde	41	0.08%
Total votes		51,346	100.00%
Turnout		52,259	14.41%
APC gain from PDP			

=== Jos North/Bassa Federal Constituency by-election ===
On 2 April 2021, member for Jos North/Bassa Haruna Maitala (APC) died in a car crash. In December 2021, INEC stated its intent to use the Bimodal Voter Accreditation System (BVAS) technology for the by-election along with having polling unit workers upload results directly to the INEC results portal on Election Day. In January, INEC set the date for the by-election for 26 February alongside five other by-elections, with party primaries taking place between 26 January and 5 February.

==== Primary elections ====
All Progressives Congress

The APC scheduled its primary for 1 February, however, the process did not begin until the early morning of 2 February to nominate one of four cleared candidates. The primary was marred by mass vote-buying by the surrogates of several candidates. Later on 2 February, the party declared the primary inconclusive after both former Plateau State Commerce Commissioner Joseph Abbey Aku and former member for Jos North/Bassa Suleiman Yahaya Kwande obtained 344 votes. However, both Aku and Yahaya Kwande rejected the announced results and declared victory; the primary election panel consulted with the national party before deciding to hold a rerun primary.

The rerun primary was scheduled for 4 February, however, only Aku participated as Yahaya Kwande petitioned the national APC claiming that he had won the original primary election. The rerun ended with Aku winning overwhelmingly with 809 of 883 votes while Yahaya Kwande received only 74 votes.

APC rerun primary results
Party	Candidate	Votes	%
APC	Joseph Abbey Aku	809	91.62%
APC	Suleiman Yahaya Kwande	74	8.38%
Total votes		883	100.00%

People's Democratic Party

The PDP conducted a primary on 3 February to nominate one of its cleared candidates. Musa Agah, a Plateau State House of Assembly member for Irigwe/Rukuba, emerged as the nominee with 54% of the vote, defeating 2019 PDP nominee Jonathan Dabo.

PDP primary results
Party	Candidate	Votes	%
PDP	Musa Agah	152	54.29%
PDP	Jonathan Dabo	127	45.36%
PDP	David Racha	1	0.36%
Total votes		280	100.00%

==== General election ====
In the days before the election, observers noted that the race was shaping up to have three major candidates: APC nominee Joseph Abbey Aku, PDP nominee Musa Agah Avia, and PRP nominee Muhammad Adamu Alkali. Analysts also observed regional dynamics as providing issues for the major party nominees and an opening for Alkali as both Aku and Agah Avia are Christians from Bassa LGA which could’ve lead to potential vote splitting to the benefit of Alkali, a Muslim from Jos North LGA. Another potential benefit for Alkali were the contentious APC primaries which allowed him to reach out to aggrieved APC members.

On Election Day, INEC was commended for the timely opening of units and functioning BVAS machines but voters noted low turnout of the electorate. When results were tabulated and announced, Agah Avia emerged the winner as he beat first runner-up Alkali by under 3,000 votes with a turnout of 18.07%. Reactions from the PDP claimed the result was a sign of the party's good prospects for 2023 in Plateau while the PRP party agent refused to sign the election final result sheet, alleging that there were irregularities at the Tudun Wada/Kabon collation centre. In the weeks after the election, pundits argued over if the PRP share was simply a protest vote in the wake of contested APC primaries or a sign of wider disdain for the Plateau APC.

On September 2, the Tribunal sacked Avia and declared Alkali the victor after the PRP presented evidence of overvoting. In late October, a Court of Appeal judgment upheld the Tribunal's ruling and ordered Alkali to be seated due to both overvoting in the general election and improprieties in the PDP nomination process. Alkali was sworn in on 14 November 2022.

Candidates' vote share
1. ~~Musa Agah Avia (PDP)~~ (37.7%)
2. Muhammad Adamu Alkali (PRP) (35.3%)
3. Joseph Abbey Aku (APC) (24.4%)
4. Other candidates (2.63%)

2022 Jos North/Bassa South Federal Constituency by-election
Party	Candidate	Votes	%
PDP	~~Musa Agah Avia~~	40,343	37.69%
PRP	Muhammad Adamu Alkali	37,757	35.28%
APC	Joseph Abbey Aku	26,111	24.40%
ADC	Samaila Achigak Ahalu	1,833	1.71%
ADP	Jaafar Bala Sulaiman	571	0.53%
New Nigeria Peoples Party	Salahudeen Uba Ibrahim	136	0.13%
YPP	Francis Sati Agwom	84	0.08%
APP	Fwangmun John Verengkat	55	0.05%
APM	Umar Nasiru	52	0.05%
SDP	Panshak John Verengkat	52	0.05%
LP	Aliyu Umar Salihu	33	0.03%
Total votes		107,026	100.00%
Turnout		108,110	18.07%
PRP gain from APC			

=== Ogoja/Yala Federal Constituency by-election ===
On 22 September 2021, member for Ogoja/Yala Agom Jarigbe (PDP) resigned after being sworn in as Senator for Cross River North. In December 2021, INEC stated its intent to use the Bimodal Voter Accreditation System (BVAS) technology for the by-election along with having polling unit workers upload results directly to the INEC results portal on Election Day. In January, INEC set the date for the by-election for 26 February alongside five other by-elections, with party primaries taking place between 26 January and 5 February.

==== Primary elections ====
All Progressives Congress

The APC conducted a primary on 1 February to pick a nominee. The consensus nominee became Jude Ngaji, a former aide to governors Liyel Imoke and Benedict Ayade, who ran unopposed. Prior to the primary, the party prevented candidates from purchasing nomination forms as it attempted to reach consensus leading to accusations of imposition from candidates.

People's Democratic Party

The PDP conducted a primary on 3 February to nominate one of its cleared candidates. Mike Usibe, a former Cross River State commissioner, emerged as the nominee with nearly 80% of the vote, defeating barrister Godwin Offiono.

PDP primary results
Party	Candidate	Votes	%
PDP	Mike Usibe	184	78.63%
PDP	Godwin Offiono	45	19.23%
PDP	Margaret Odey	5	2.14%
Total votes		234	100.00%

==== General election ====
In the days before the election, observers noted a contentious atmosphere as the two major parties traded accusations of planned manipulation and fears of violence rose. Both parties strove to win the election as it (along with the Akpabuyo State Constituency by-election) was one of the first elections in Cross River State since Governor Benedict Ayade defected to the APC in May 2021 and thus a powerful signal for the path the state is taking ahead of the 2023 elections.

On the day of the election, allegations of manipulation were quickly leveled with Ogoja Local Government Chairman Emmanuel Ishabor (APC) being accused of leading security agents to briefly disrupt voting and personally assaulting a young voter along with a video of Ayade aide Jimmy Bajie supposedly stealing ballot boxes; although he claimed to simply have been helping INEC officials carry the boxes. Feared violence also transpired as the convey of former member, now-Senator, Jarigbe was attacked by gunmen in Ogoja after the attackers had stolen several results sheets; luckily, no one was injured in the attack and INEC officials had already recorded the results on some of the stolen sheets.

Despite the violence and disruptions, INEC announced the full results with Jude Ngaji of the APC winning by about 2,000 votes over Mike Usibe of the PDP; the election's turnout was 23.69%. Almost immediately, the PDP rejected the declared results and stated its intention to challenge the election.

Candidates' vote share
1. Jude Ngaji (APC) (52.0%)
2. Mike Usibe (PDP) (47.0%)
3. Other candidates (1.05%)

2022 Ogoja/Yala Federal Constituency by-election
Party	Candidate	Votes	%
APC	Jude Ngaji	22,778	51.97%
PDP	Mike Usibe	20,590	46.98%
APM	Ongro Rock Ogbeche	135	0.31%
NRM	Christian Chigbe Ilop	84	0.19%
APP	Rapheal Ipuola Okacha	76	0.17%
PRP	Ogonyi Joseph Ugbochi	65	0.15%
YPP	Itegila Igbaji Monkom	50	0.11%
LP	Ebi Dominic Esuo	29	0.07%
SDP	Ogidi Fidelis Odey	21	0.05%
Total votes		43,828	100.00%
Turnout		45,356	23.69%
APC gain from PDP			

== See also ==
- 2022 Nigerian state legislative elections
