= Princess Teju Okuyiga =

Nigerian politician

Member of the Ekiti State House of Assembly
- Incumbent
- Assumed office 6 June 2023
- Constituency: Gboyin I
- In office June 2019 – June 2023

Personal details
- Party: All Progressives Congress
- Education: Obafemi Awolowo University; University of Northampton; The London School of Journalism
- Occupation: Politician

Princess Teju Okuyiga is a Nigerian politician. She is currently a member of Ekiti State House of Assembly representing Gboyin Constituency.

== Early life and education ==
Okuyiga attended tertiary institutions in Nigeria and the United Kingdom. She obtained a Bachelor of Science in International Relations from Obafemi Awolowo University in 1986. She also obtained a diploma in Computer studies from Microheal Software and Hardware Consultant in 1990 and a Diploma in Journalism from the London School of Journalism in 2007. She later obtained a Bachelor of Arts in Criminology from the University of Northampton in the United Kingdom in 2010.

== Political career ==
Okuyiga joined the All Progressives Congress (APC) and became active in politics in Ekiti State. In the 2019 Ekiti State House of Assembly election, she was elected to represent the Aiyekire constituency on the APC platform.

In the 2023 Nigerian elections, Okuyiga was re-elected to the Ekiti State House of Assembly. She began her second term on 6 June 2023 and represents Gboyin I Constituency in the Seventh Assembly.
