= Gboyega Aribisogan =

Nigerian politician

Right Honourable Gboyega Aribisogan

Speaker of the Ekiti State House of Assembly
- In office 15 November 2022 – 21 November 2022
- Deputy: Hakeem Jamiu
- Preceded by: Funminiyi Afuye
- Succeeded by: Bunmi Adelugba

Member of the Ekiti State House of Assembly
- Incumbent
- Assumed office June 2019
- Constituency: Ikole I constituency

Gboyega Aribisogan is a Nigerian politician who served as speaker of the Ekiti State House of Assembly in November 2022. He is a two-term lawmaker representing Ikole I constituency. Aribisogan who hails from Ijesha-Isu in Ikole Local Government Area, in the North senatorial district of Ekiti State was elected on 15 November 2022 as the speaker of the house following the demise of Funminiyi Afuye. He was impeached on 21 November 2022 six days after taking office.

== Political career ==
Gboyega Aribisogan is a Nigerian politician and a member of the Ekiti State House of Assembly representing Ikole Constituency I. He was first elected to the Assembly in 2015 and was re-elected in 2019 on the platform of the All Progressives Congress (APC). During his second term, he served as the Leader of Government Business in the House before his election as Speaker in November 2022.

== Speakership ==
Following the death of Speaker Funminiyi Afuye in October 2022, the Ekiti State House of Assembly commenced the process of electing a new Speaker. On 15 November 2022, Aribisogan was elected Speaker after polling 15 votes to defeat Olubunmi Adelugba, who received 10 votes. He was sworn in immediately after the election by the Clerk of the House, Tola Esan.

In his acceptance speech, Aribisogan thanked members of the House for the confidence reposed in him and pledged to discharge his responsibilities in accordance with the Constitution of the Federal Republic of Nigeria and the Standing Orders of the Ekiti State House of Assembly. He also expressed his commitment to promoting cooperation among members and ensuring the effective discharge of the Assembly's legislative responsibilities.

== Removal from office ==
On 21 November 2022, six days after his election, Aribisogan was removed as Speaker by members of the Ekiti State House of Assembly during a plenary session. Following his removal, Olubunmi Adelugba was elected as the new Speaker, becoming the first woman to occupy the office in the state's history. The leadership change occurred amid disagreements among members of the Assembly over the succession to the office following the death of the former Speaker.

Aribisogan rejected his removal, maintaining that the process did not comply with the rules governing the House. He subsequently instituted legal proceedings challenging his impeachment and petitioned the Inspector-General of Police, alleging threats to his life after the change in leadership.
