= Olagbaju Bolaji =

Nigerian politicians

Olagbaju Bolaji is a Nigerian politician. She served as the Deputy Speaker, representing Ado II, in the 7th Ekiti State House of Assembly. In November 2023, she was elected Chairperson of the Conference of Nigerian Female Parliamentarians (CONFEPA).
