= Akpabuyo =

Coordinates: 5°N 8.4°E

- LGA
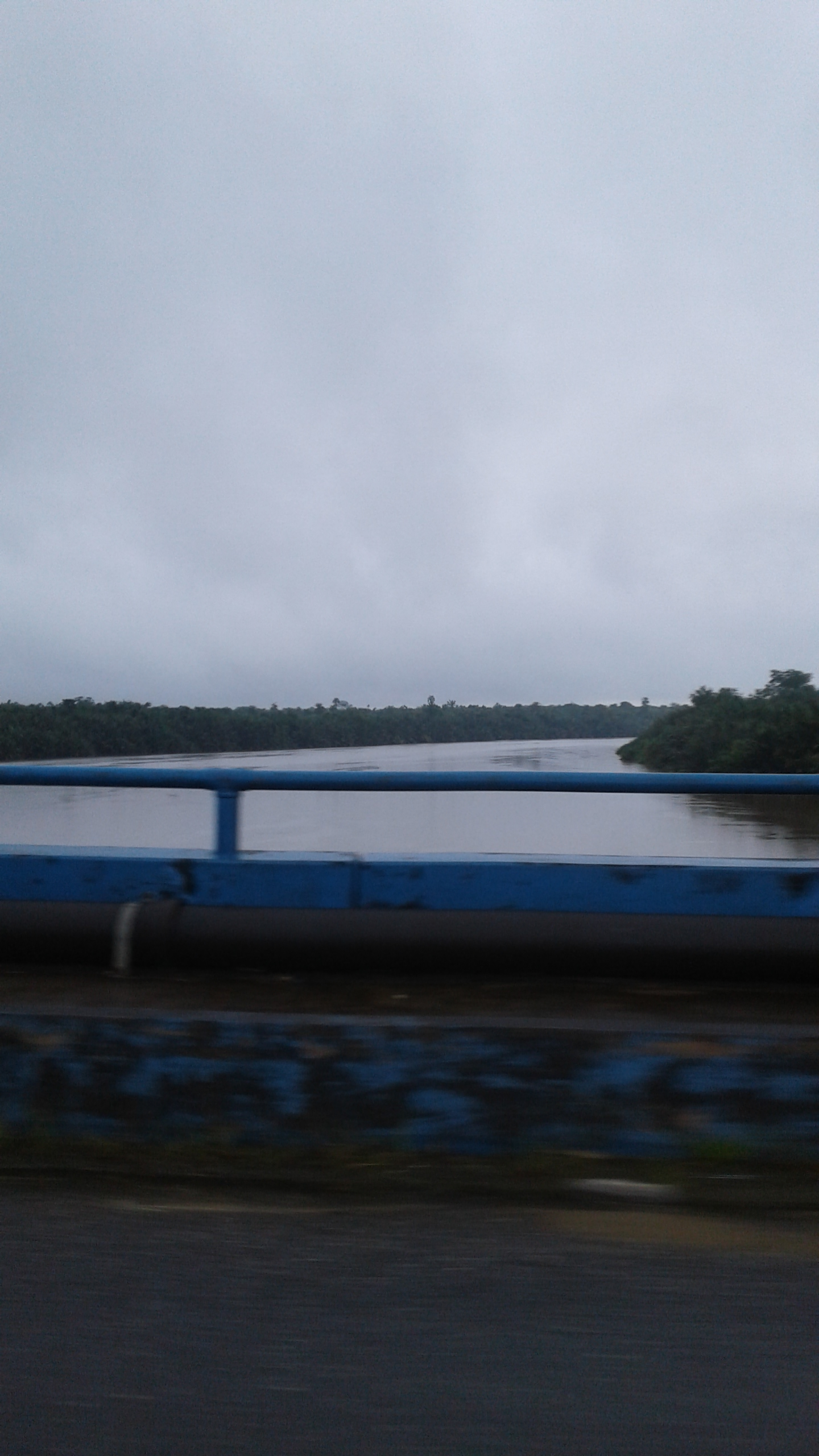
- Interactive map of Akpabuyo
- Country: Nigeria
- State: Cross River State
- Capital: Ikot Nakanda

Government
  - Local Government Chairman: Effiong Bassey Effiong
  - Member of the Cross River State House of Assembly: Effiom Ekeng Edet

Area
  - Total: 1,241 km^{2} (479 sq mi)

Population (2006)
  - Total: 271,395
  - Density: 218.7/km^{2} (566.4/sq mi)
- Time zone: UTC+1 (WAT)
- Postal code: 541
- Website: www.crossriverhub.com.ng/akpabuyo

Akpabuyo is a Local Government Area of Cross River State, Nigeria. Its headquarters are in the town of Ikot Nakanda.

It has an area of 1,241 km^{2} and a population of 271,395 at the 2006 census.

The postal code of the area is 541.

Akpabuyo was established as a separate local government area in 1991.

Elizabeth Edem Ironbar represented the town on Cross River State House of Assembly from 2015 to 2021.

== Geography and economy ==
The Akpabuyo local government area is 1241 square kilometres (479 square miles) in size and has an 88 percent humidity level. Large forest reserves are another feature of the region, which has an average temperature of 26 degrees Celsius (79 degrees Fahrenheit). There are other rivers and tributaries in Akpabuyo LGA as well.

In Akpabuyo LGA, fishing is a major economic activity, but farming is also well-liked, with large-scale cultivation of crops such cassava, cocoyam, coconut, pineapple, kolanut, and oil palm. Minerals like gold, limestone, and crude oil are also abundant in Akpabuyo LGA. With markets like the Akpabuyo main market and the Ikang market offering consumers a range of items, trade also plays a significant role in Akpabuyo's economy.
