= Afuye =

Afuye is a surname. Notable people with the surname include:

- Funminiyi Afuye (1956–2022), Nigerian politician
- Monisade Afuye (born 1958), Nigerian politician
