= 2019 Ekiti State House of Assembly election =

State election in Nigeria

The 2019 Ekiti State House of Assembly election was held on 9 March 2019, to elect members of the Ekiti State House of Assembly in Nigeria. All the 26 seats were up for election in the Ekiti State House of Assembly.

Funminiyi Afuye from APC representing Ikere I constituency was elected Speaker, while Hakeem Jamiu from APC representing Irepodun/Ifelodun II constituency was elected Deputy Speaker.

== Results ==
The result of the election is listed below.

- Lucas Oluwatoyin Felix from APC won Ado I constituency
- Balogun Adekemi Adebambi from APC won Ado II constituency
- Olajide Adegoke Ayobami from APC won Efon constituency
- Ayokunle Yemisi from APC won Ekiti South West I constituency
- Olatunji Joseph from APC won Ekiti South West II constituency
- Akingbolu Tajudeen from APC won Ekiti West I constituency
- Olubunmi Rachael Adelugba from APC won Emure constituency
- Teju Okuyiga from APC won Aiyekire constituency
- Fawekun Abiodun Babatunde from APC won Ido/Osi I constituency
- Akinnoso Emman from APC won Ido/OsI II constituency
- Ojo Martins Ademola from APC won Ijero state constituency
- Funminiyi Afuye from APC won Ikere I constituency
- Babatunde Lawrence Idowu from APC won Ikere II constituency
- Olugboyega Aribisogan Mathew from APC won Ikole I constituency
- Adeoye Stephen Aribasoye from APC won Ikole II constituency
- Ogunleye Olutope from APC won Ilejemeje constituency
- Akindele Femi Olanrewaju from APC won Irepodun/Ifelodun I constituency
- Ayodeji Hakeem Jamiu from APC won Irepodun/Ifelodun II constituency
- Ajayi Ayodeji Moses from APC won Ise/Orun constituency
- Adeyemi Raphael Ajibade from APC won Moba I constituency
- Arubu Michael Kola from APC won Moba II constituency
- Awoyemi Oluwaseun from APC won Oye I constituency
- Reuben and Ogunyemi Olatunji Abraham from APC won Oye II constituency
- Juwa Adegbuyi from APC won Ekiti East I constituency
- Lateef Akanle from APC won Ekiti East II constituency
- Johnson Oyebola Bode-Adeoye from APC won Ekiti West II constituency
