= Census in Nigeria =

The Nigerian census has taken place irregularly since independence. It collects data on various statistics related to population and housing. It is often a controversial process with frequent allegations of data manipulation for political purposes. The 2006 census is the last census to take place in Nigeria.

== History ==
The first census in what is now Nigeria was the 1866 census of the British-controlled Lagos Colony. Beginning in 1871, censuses were taken in Lagos Colony every 10 years (1871, 1881, 1891, and 1901), following British tradition of decennial censuses. Lagos Colony was merged into the Southern Nigeria Protectorate in 1906, and the 1911 census nominally covered that combined area. However, since British colonial control did not effectively extend to all the areas they claimed as part of the Southern Nigeria Protectorate at the time, the 1911 census only covered part of the area it was supposed to. Meanwhile, census taking had also begun taking place in the Northern Nigeria Protectorate at some point. After the two protectorates were merged in 1914, their respective censuses were merged. The 1921 census was thus the first to cover all of Nigeria. Another census took place in 1931, but unrest in the east prevented census taking in some towns and locust swarms in the north resulted in some census staff being diverted to "anti-locust duties" instead. Due to the Second World War, no census took place in Nigeria in 1941.

However, all of these early censuses were really more like population estimates. They were based only on records of people who were paying taxes, and they excluded infants and the elderly.

The last census to take place under British rule was staggered over two years, 1952 and 1953. It was the first to use modern methods, but many people were suspicious of its intentions and did not participate, resulting in significant undercounting. The fact that it was not taken simultaneously in different states also limited its usefulness in comparing between states.

The first census to take place after Nigerian independence was the 1962 census. It was also the first to take place simultaneously across the entire country. However, this census was highly contentious because its results would determine parliamentary representation, revenue allocation, and how many employees the civil service would hire from each state. Since the north was considered dominant in Nigerian politics at the time, the 1962 census was especially heavily publicised by southern politicians. When the results were published, they indicated that "the north had lost its majority share of the country's population". The government ordered a second census to take place in 1963, with the result that "an additional 8.5 million people were discovered in the north". The 1963 census ended up being contested in the Supreme Court, but the court declined to issue a ruling on the matter, saying it "lacked jurisdiction over the administrative functions of the federal government".

Another census was conducted in 1973, but this one was so controversial, and the results seemed so implausible, that the government decided not to publish the results on the grounds that there seemed to have been deliberate fabrication of data for political purposes.

The National Population Commission was formed in 1989, and it conducted the 1991 census of Nigeria. This census was also heavily contested, with over 100 court cases filed against the National Population Commission.

The 2006 census introduced several new features. It was the first census to include a housing component, and it was also the first to use GPS and satellite data as well as machine-readable forms. However, it was also highly politicised and had several shortcomings. For example, it did not provide data below local government levels, and the post-enumeration survey was poorly implemented. A number of census takers also quit in protest of lack of pay, and there was also reportedly some disruption of census taking in the east by the Movement for the Actualization of the Sovereign State of Biafra. Once the preliminary census figures were published in early 2007, several state governments contested the official numbers. For example, in Lagos State, which had conducted its own "parallel" census in 2006 in collaboration with the National Population Commission, the state governor Bola Tinubu called for a recount because the state and national censuses had different results.

The next census was supposed to take place in 2016, but due to lack of funds, it was initially scheduled for 2018 and then rescheduled for 2022 and then in 2022 postponed again so that it would take place in 2023. As of January 2023, it was estimated that almost 800,000 workers would be involved in taking the census, processing its results, and other related roles.

== Statistics measured ==
The 2006 census, for example, collected information on things like age, sex, occupation, literacy, employment, housing, and access to water, electricity, and other household amenities. Among the statistics it did not include were birth and death rates, migration, and disability.

== Political issues ==
The Nigerian census tends to be controversial, and figures are often manipulated for political and economic reasons. Representation in the House of Representatives is based on census results, with each state receiving constituencies based on state population, and each constituency is at least in theory supposed to represent a roughly equal population. Census results also determine how much money is allocated to state and local governments.

== See also ==
- Demographics of Nigeria
- National Population Commission, which is responsible for taking the census
