= Bunmi Adelugba =

Nigerian politician

Right Honourable Bunmi Adelugba

Speaker of the Ekiti State House of Assembly
- Incumbent
- Assumed office 21 November 2022
- Deputy: Hakeem Jamiu
- Preceded by: Gboyega Aribisogan

Member of the Ekiti State House of Assembly
- Constituency: Emure Constituency

Bunmi Adelugba is a Nigerian politician and a lawmaker representing Emure Constituency at the Ekiti State House of Assembly. She is the current speaker and the first female to lead the parliament. She was elected on 21 November 2022 following the impeachment of Gboyega Aribisogan.

== Biography ==
Adelugba has a master's degree in financial management. She has over twenty years experience in auditing, corporate advisory services and financial consultancy. She was a former special adviser of Ekiti State Government on revenue matters.

== Awards and honours ==
She is a member of the Institute of Chartered Accountants of Nigeria (FCA), the Chartered Institute of Taxation of Nigeria (FCTI) and a Chartered Public Finance Accountant (CPFA).
