= Adedayo =

- Gender: Unisex
- Language: Yoruba

Origin
- Origin: Nigerian
- Region of origin: Southwest of Nigeria

Adédayọ̀ audio is both a surname and a given name of Yoruba origin, meaning "the crown or royalty became joyful". Notable people with the name include:

- Adelayo Adedayo (born 1988), British actress
- Adedayo Adebayo (born 1970), Nigerian rugby union player
- Adedayo Clement Adeyeye (born 1957), Nigerian politician
- Adedayo Omolafe (1964–2021), Nigerian politician
