= Funminiyi Afuye =

Nigerian politician (1956–2022)

Right Honourable Funminiyi Afuye

Speaker of the Ekiti State House of Assembly
- In office 6 June 2019 – 19 October 2022
- Deputy: Hakeem Jamiu
- Succeeded by: Gboyega Aribisogan

Ekiti State Commissioner of Information
- In office 2011–2014
- Governor: Kayode Fayemi

Ekiti State Commissioner of Integration and Intergovernmental Affairs
- In office 2011–2014
- Governor: Kayode Fayemi

Member of the Ekiti State House of Assembly
- In office June 2019 – 19 October 2022
- Constituency: Ikere constituency I
- In office June 2007 – June 2011
- Constituency: Ikere constituency I

Personal details
- Born: 11 July 1956 Ikere-Ekiti, Western Region, British Nigeria (now in Ekiti State, Nigeria)
- Died: 19 October 2022 (aged 66)
- Profession: Lawyer; Politician; Educator

Funminiyi Ebenezer Afuye (11 July 1956 – 19 October 2022) was a Nigerian politician and lawyer.

He was the commissioner of Ekiti State Ministry of Information and a two-time member of the Ekiti State Assembly representing Ikere constituency I.

He was elected speaker of the sixth Ekiti State Assembly from June 6, 2019 until his passing in October 2022.

== Political offices ==
Funminiyi Afuye was a member of the third assembly between 2007 and 2011. From 2011 to 2014, he was a Commissioner for two different ministries; Ekiti State Ministry of Information and Ministry of Integration and Intergovernmental Affairs during the era of Governor Kayode Fayemi. He was re elected in the sixth assembly and he became the speaker of the house on 6 June 2019.
