= Solomon Maren =

Nigerian politician

Solomon Maren is a Nigerian politician. He was a member of the Federal House of Representatives, representing Mangu/Bokkos federal constituency of Plateau State. He was succeeded David Ishaya Lalu.
