= Suleiman Yahaya Kwande =

Nigerian politician

Suleiman Yahaya Kwande is a Nigerian politician. He was member of the House of Representatives for the Jos North/Bassa Constituency of Plateau State. He was succeeded by Haruna Ibrahim Maitala.
