= List of Nigerian films of 2022 =

This is a list of Nigerian films released in 2022.

== 2022 ==
=== January–March ===
Opening		Title	Director	Cast	Genre	Notes	Ref.
J A N U A R Y	1	Chief Daddy 2: Going for Broke	John Demps	Funke Akindele-Bello Nkem Owoh Patience Ozokwo Zainab Balogun Shaffy Bello	Comedy	Released on Netflix	
J A N U A R Y	7	Over Her Dead Body	Sola Osofisan	Nse Ikpe Etim Binta Ayo Mogaji Uche Mac-Auley Patrick ‘Rico Swavey’ Fakoya Gregory Ojefua	Comedy drama		
J A N U A R Y	21	Juju Stories	C.J. ObasiAbba Makama Michael Omonua	Paul Utomi Timini Egbuson Adebukola Oladipupo Uzoamaka Aniunoh Michael Ejoor		A three-part anthology film First premiered at the 2021 edition of the Locarno Film Festival	
J A N U A R Y	28	Dinner At My Place	Kevin Apaa	Timini Egbuson Sophie Alakija Bisola Aiyeola	Romantic comedy		
F E B R U A R Y	2	Head Over Bills	Dabby Chimere	Shaffy Bello Bimbo Ademoye Racheal Okonkwo Uzor Arukwe Mofe Duncan	Romantic drama		
M A R C H							

=== April–June ===
Opening		Title	Director	Cast	Genre	Notes	Ref.
A P R I L	8	King of Thieves (Ogundabede)	Adebayo Tijani and Tope Adebayo Salami	Toyin Abraham; Femi Adebayo Salami; Odunlade Adekola; Ibrahim Chatta; Adedimeji Lateef	Drama	Epic about mythical Yoruba character Odu Ogunda Ogbe also known as Ogundabede	
A P R I L	15	The Blood Covenant	Fiyin Gambo	Tobi Bakre; Shawn Faqua; Uzor Arukwe; Erica Nlewedim; Alexx Ekubo		Coproduction between FilmOne and Inkblot Productions	
M A Y							
J U N E							

=== July–September ===
Opening		Title	Director	Cast	Genre	Notes	Ref.
J U L Y	22	Tiger's Tail	Uyoyou Adia	Alexx EkuboNatacha AkideAkintoba Adeoluwa Zubby Michael			
J U L Y	29	Hey You	Uyoyou Adia	Timini EgbusonEfe Irele Rotimi Salami Stan Nze Tope Olowoniyan	Romantic comedy	Produced by Niyi Akinmolayan and Victoria Akujobi	
A U G U S T	5	Sista	Biodun Stephen	Kehinde Bankole Bisola Aiyeola Deyemi Okanlawon			
A U G U S T		The Set Up 2	Naz Onuzo	Adesua EtomiNancy Isime Kehinde Bankole			
S E P T E M B E R							
S E P T E M B E R		Anikulapo	Kunle Afolayan				

=== October–December ===
Opening	Title	Director	Cast	Genre	Notes	Ref.
O C T O B E R						
N O V E M B E R						
D E C E M B E R						

== See also ==
- 2022 in Nigeria
- List of Nigerian films
