= Adeoye Aribasoye =

Speaker of the 7th Ekiti State House of Assembly

Adeoye Aribasoye is a Nigerian politician currently serving as the speaker of the 7th Ekiti State House of Assembly since June 2023 and as vice chairman of the Nigerian Conference of Speakers since September 2023. He is also the current chairman of the Southwest caucus of speakers of state assemblies. He is a member of the All Progressives Congress (APC) representing Ikole Constituency II.

He was nominated for speakership by Femi Akindele a member of the APC representing Irepodun/Ifelodun Constituency 1 and seconded by Lateef Akanle of the APC representing Ekiti East Constituency II. Aribasoye was elected unchallenged.

He was chairman of the House Committee on Media and Publicity and later served as chief whip in the 6th assembly.
