= Juwa Adegbuyi =

Nigerian politician

State Representative
- Constituency: Ekiti East

Personal details
- Born: May 4, 1969
- Died: January 30, 2021 (aged 51)
- Occupation: Politician

Juwa Adegbuyi (born May 4, 1969) was a Nigerian politician. He was a member of the Ekiti State House of Assembly representing Ekiti East Constituency. He died on January 30, 2021.
