= Demographics of Nigeria =

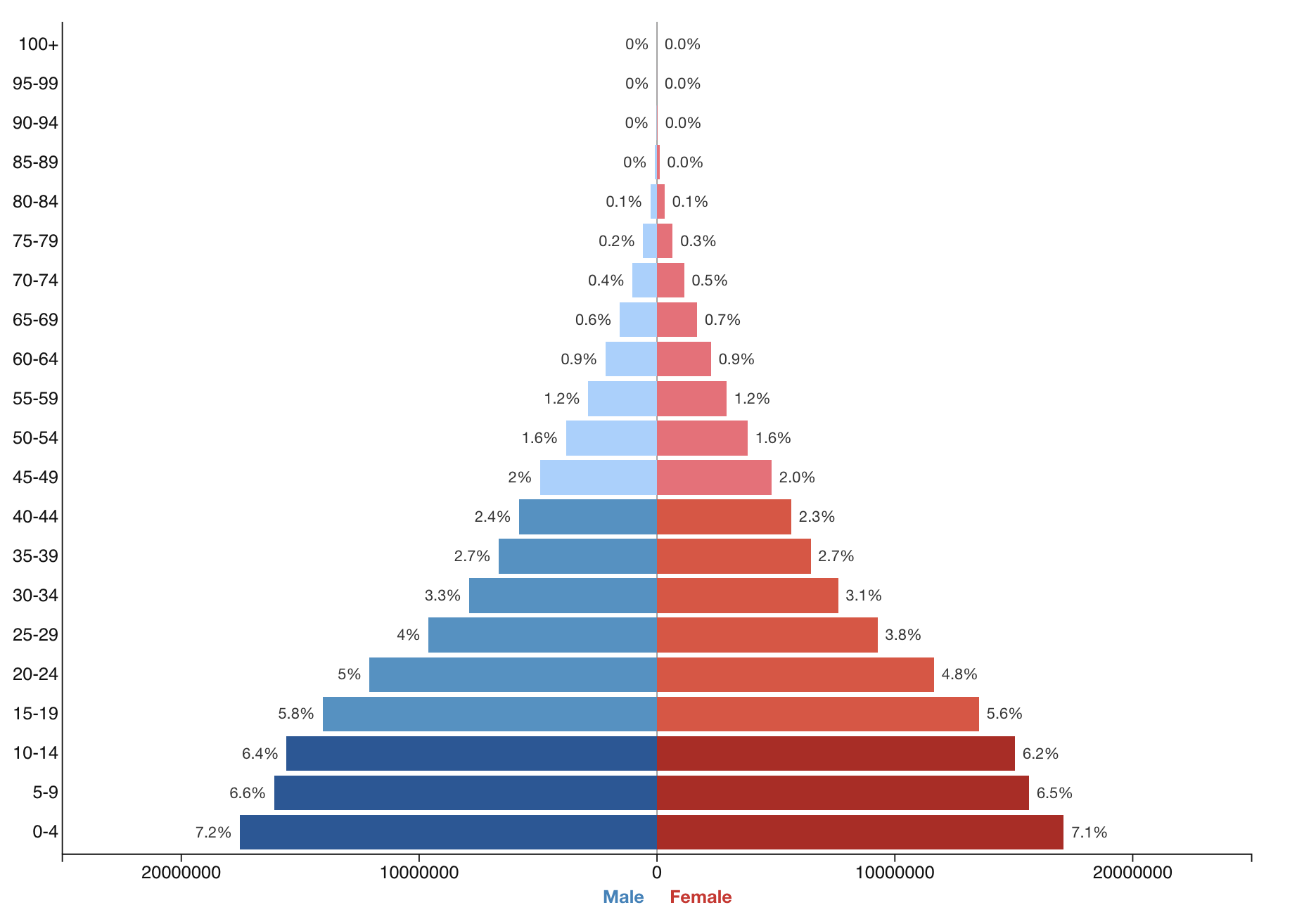
- Population pyramid of Nigeria in 2026
- Population: 237,527,782 (2025 est.)
- Growth rate: +2.1% (2026 est.)
- Birth rate: 32.2 births/1,000 population (2025 est.)
- Death rate: 11.6 deaths/1,000 population (2025 est.)
- Life expectancy: 55.0 years
  - male: 54.6 years
  - female: 53.3 years
- Fertility rate: 4.21 children born/woman (2026 est.)
- Infant mortality: 56.68 deaths/1,000 live births
- Net migration rate: −0.21 migrant(s)/1,000 population (2022 est.)

Age structure
- 0–14 years: 51.7%
- 15–64 years: 45.0%
- 65 and over: 3.3%

Sex ratio
- Total: 1.02 male(s)/female (2022 est.)
- At birth: 1.06 male(s)/female
- Under 15: 1.04 male(s)/female
- 65 and over: 0.77 male(s)/female

Nationality
- Nationality: Nigerian

Language
- Official: English

Historical population of Nigeria

Nigeria is the most populous country in Africa and the sixth most populous in the world. Nigeria is also one of the most densely populated countries in Africa, with approximately 237 million people as of 2025 in an area of 923,768 km^{2} (356,669 sq mi).

54.3% of Nigerians are urban dwellers, with the annual rate of urbanisation being estimated at 3.92%. (Note: compare to Nigeria's overall growth rate 2.53%) Nigeria is home to 250 ethnic groups speaking over 500 languages and the variety of customs and traditions among them gives the country great cultural diversity. The three largest ethnic groups, namely the Hausas, Yorubas, and Igbos constitute more than 60% of the population. The Ijaw, Efik, Ibibio, Annang, Ogoni, Tiv, Urhobo-Isoko, Edo, and Itsekiri are some of the other sizeable ethnic groups. Over 1.2 million people living in Nigeria (0.5% of its total population, or 1 in every 200 people living in Nigeria) are from a continent other than Africa. In particular, 100,000 people are from the United States, 75,000 are from Lebanon, 60,000 are from China, and 16,000 are from the United Kingdom.

Nigeria has a young population overall, with 42.54% of inhabitants between the ages of 0–14. There is also a very high dependency ratio at 88.2 dependents per 100 non-dependents. The three main religious groups are Muslims (estimated to be 53.5% of the total population), Christians (estimated at 45.9%), and adherents of indigenous religions (estimated at 0.6%). The predominantly Christian Igbo are found in the south-east. Roman Catholicism is the largest Christian denomination in Igboland, but Anglicanism is also strong, as are Pentecostalism and other Evangelical denominations.

Persons of different ethnic backgrounds most commonly communicate in English, although knowledge of two or more Nigerian languages is widespread. Hausa, Igbo, and Yoruba are the most widely used Nigerian languages. Nigerian Pidgin is used widely as an unofficial medium of communication, especially in the Nigerian cities of Warri, Sapele, Ughelli, Benin, and Port Harcourt.

== Population ==
Historical population
Year	Pop.	±% p.a.
1000	7,000,000	—
1500	10,000,000	+0.07%
1921	18,720,000	+0.15%
1952	30,403,305	+1.58%
1962	45,920,000	+4.21%
1991	88,992,200	+2.31%
2006	140,431,790	+3.09%
2011	162,471,000	+2.96%
2022	227,830,000	+3.12%

Total population of states in Nigeria, according to the 2006 census.

Nigeria's population has been increasing rapidly for at least the last 5 decades due to very high birth rates, quadrupling its population during this time. Growth was fastest in the 1980s, after child mortality dropped rapidly. It has slowed slightly since then as both the birth rate and total fertility rate have declined marginally since a 1978 peak. According to the 2017 revision of the World Population Prospects the total population was 191 million in 2016, compared to only 38 million in 1950. Fertility rates turned out to be lower than expected in Nigeria, with double-digit decreases.

The proportion of children under the age of 15 in 2010 was 44.0%, 53.2% were between 15 and 65 years of age, while 2.7% were 65 years or older. There is a large degree of population momentum, with 3.2 per cent growth leading to the projected population of 546 million by 2100.

The federal government has not elected to implement the type of controversial family planning programs that have reduced population growth of other developing nations, a result of low political support for these programs and a cultural preference for large families as well as high levels of social instability. Rising educational levels and health care improvements may enable future parents to plan for smaller families.

The former Nigeria's chairman of National Population Commission, Eze Duruiheoma, delivering Nigeria's statement in New York City on sustainable cities, human mobility and international migration in the 51st session of Commission on Population and Development, said that "Nigeria remains the most populous in Africa, the seventh globally with an estimated population of over 198 million. The World Population Prospects predicts that by 2050, Nigeria will become the third most populated country in the world. Over the last 50 years, Nigeria's urban population has grown at an average annual growth rate of more than 6.5% without commensurate increases in social amenities and infrastructure." He also stated that the population "grew substantially from 17.3% in 1967 to 49.4% in 2017."

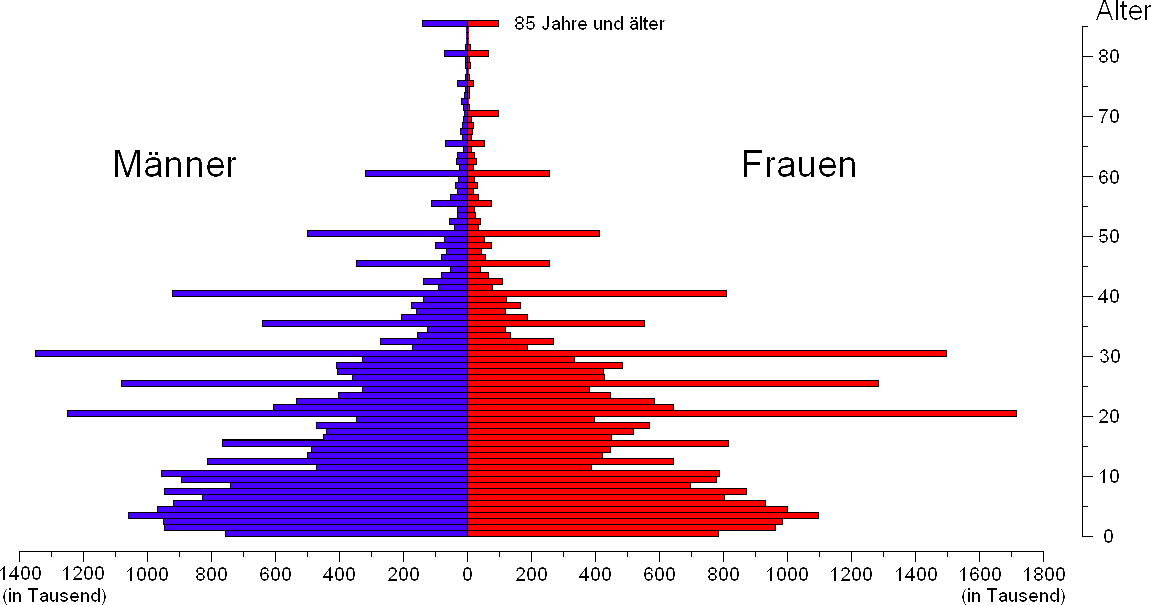
Population pyramid of Nigeria in 1963 (Hausa)

View source data.
View source data.
View source data.

=== Population by sex and age ===
Population by sex and age group (Census 21.III.2006)

Age	Population	Percent
Total	140,431,790	100
0–4	22,594,967	16.09
5–9	20,005,380	14.25
10–14	16,135,950	11.49
15–19	14,899,419	10.61
20–24	13,435,079	9.57
25–29	12,211,426	8.70
30–34	9,467,538	6.74
35–39	7,331,755	5.22
40–44	6,456,470	4.60
45–49	4,591,293	3.27
50–54	4,249,219	3.03
55–59	2,066,247	1.47
60–64	2,450,286	1.74
65–69	1,151,048	0.82
70–74	1,264,937	0.95
75–79	579,838	0.41
80–84	760,053	0.54
85+	715,225	0.51

Age group	Total	Male	Female	%
0–14	58,736,297	30,462,148	28,274,149	41.83
15–64	77,158,732	38,348,799	38,809,933	54.94
65+	4,536,761	2,534,541	2,002,220	3.23

Population by age group (estimates 1.VII.2016) (Data are projections based on the 2006 Population Census.)

Age	Population	Percent
Total	193,392,517	100
0–4	31,116,156	16.09
5–9	27,549,964	14.25
10–14	22,221,265	11.49
15–19	20,518,404	10.61
20–24	18,501,820	9.57
25–29	16,816,694	8.70
30–34	13,038,009	6.74
35–39	10,096,763	5.22
40–44	8,891,384	4.60
45–49	6,322,797	3.27
50–54	5,851,717	3.03
55–59	2,845,486	1.47
60–64	3,374,357	1.74
65–69	1,585,140	0.82
70–74	1,832,402	0.95
75–79	798,511	0.41
80–84	1,046,690	0.54
85+	984,956	0.51
0–14	80,887,385	41.83
15–64	107,242,389	55.45
65+	5,262,743	2.72

Population by age group (estimates 1.VII.2020) (Source: National Population Commission.)

Age	Population	Percent
Total	206,283,338	100
0–4	32,819,289	15.91
5–9	29,231,173	14.17
10–14	25,970,650	12.59
15–19	20,342,647	9.86
20–24	17,871,826	8.66
25–29	14,992,764	7.27
30–34	13,402,007	6.50
35–39	12,505,764	6.06
40–44	10,427,144	5.05
45–49	7,963,484	3.86
50–54	6,383,640	3.09
55–59	5,002,819	2.43
60–64	3,696,336	1.79
65–69	2,447,988	1.19
70–74	1,591,000	0.77
75–79	915,154	0.44
80+	719,653	0.35
0–14	88,021,112	42.67
15–64	112,588,431	54.58
65+	5,673,795	2.75

Household population by age and sex (DHS 2024):

Age group	Male	Female	Total
0–4	16.1	15.0	15.5
5–9	16.5	15.7	16.1
10–14	13.8	13.8	13.8
15–19	9.0	9.3	9.2
20–24	6.4	7.9	7.1
25–29	6.0	7.5	6.8
30–34	5.5	6.4	6.0
35–39	5.5	5.5	5.5
40–44	5.1	4.5	4.8
45–49	4.1	3.3	3.7
50–54	3.1	3.9	3.5
55–59	2.2	2.2	2.2
60–64	2.4	1.8	2.1
65-69	1.6	1.2	1.4
70-74	1.3	0.9	1.1
75-79	0.7	0.5	0.6
80+	0.8	0.7	0.7
Age group	Male	Female	Total
0–14	46.4	44.5	45.4
15–64	49.3	52.3	50.8
65+	4.3	3.2	3.8

=== Population projections ===
The total population in sub-Saharan Africa is projected to increase to almost one billion people, making it the most populated region outside of South-Central Asia. According to the United Nations, the population of Nigeria will reach 375 million by 2050. Nigeria might then be the 3rd most populous country in the world. In 2100, the population of Nigeria may reach 541 million. While the overall population is expected to increase, the growth rate is estimated to decrease from 1.2 per cent per year in 2010 to 0.4 per cent per year in 2050. The birth rate is also projected to decrease from 20.7 to 13.7, while the death rate is projected to increase from 8.5 in 2010 to 9.8 in 2050. By 2050, 69.6% of the population is estimated to be living in urban areas compared to 50.6% in 2010.

== Vital statistics ==
Demographics development according to the United Nations

Registration of vital events in Nigeria is not complete. The Population Department of the United Nations prepared the following estimates (UN World Population Prospects 2022).

Year	Population	Live births per year	Deaths per year	Natural change per year	CBR*	CDR*	NC*	TFR*	IMR*
1950	36 836 000	1,697,000	1,010,000	687,000	45.6	27.1	18.5	6.42	184.0
1951	37 543 000	1,731,000	1,028,000	702,000	45.7	27.1	18.5	6.42	183.2
1952	38 263 000	1,760,000	1,044,000	716,000	45.6	27.0	18.5	6.39	181.6
1953	38 986 000	1,797,000	1,056,000	741,000	45.7	26.8	18.8	6.40	180.4
1954	39 710 000	1,831,000	1,074,000	757 000	45.7	26.8	18.9	6.40	179.0
1955	40 455 000	1,869,000	1,088,000	781,000	45.7	26.6	19.1	6.40	177.9
1956	41 223 000	1,909,000	1,109,000	800,000	45.8	26.6	19.2	6.41	176.9
1957	42 010 000	1,948,000	1,124,000	824,000	45.9	26.5	19.4	6.40	176.0
1958	42 817 000	1,988,000	1,145,000	843,000	46.0	26.5	19.5	6.39	175.1
1959	43 613 000	2,026,000	1,159,000	866,000	46.0	26.3	19.7	6.38	173.8
1960	44 476 000	2,072,000	1,179,000	893,000	46.1	26.2	19.9	6.36	172.4
1961	45 381 000	2,120,000	1,192,000	928,000	46.2	26.0	20.2	6.35	171.0
1962	46 330 000	2,174,000	1,214,000	960,000	46.4	25.9	20.5	6.36	169.6
1963	47 314 000	2,220,000	1,224,000	996,000	46.4	25.6	20.8	6.35	167.2
1964	48 332 000	2,270,000	1,242,000	1,028,000	46.5	25.4	21.0	6.36	165.9
1965	49 381 000	2,320,000	1,258,000	1,061,000	46.5	25.2	21.3	6.37	165.0
1966	50 471 000	2,373,000	1,281,000	1,092,000	46.5	25.1	21.4	6.39	164.2
1967	51 570 000	2,424,000	1,365,000	1,059,000	46.5	26.2	20.3	6.40	165.8
1968	52 643 000	2,478,000	1,349,000	1,129,000	46.6	25.4	21.2	6.42	163.6
1969	53 577 000	2,533,000	1,367,000	1,166,000	46.6	25.2	21.4	6.44	162.6
1970	54 945 000	2,595,000	1,353,000	1,241,000	46.7	24.3	22.3	6.47	160.7
1971	56 194 000	2,671,000	1,348,000	1,323,000	47.0	23.7	23.3	6.53	156.9
1972	57 481 000	2,741,000	1,343,000	1,398,000	47.1	23.1	24.0	6.58	153.0
1973	58 866 000	2,819,000	1,341,000	1,479,000	47.3	22.5	24.8	6.63	149.0
1974	60 344 000	2,922,000	1,340,000	1,583,000	47.8	21.9	25.9	6.70	144.9
1975	61 971 000	3,021,000	1,336,000	1,684,000	48.1	21.3	26.8	6.77	141.0
1976	63 731 000	3,106,000	1,324,000	1,781,000	48.1	20.5	27.6	6.81	137.2
1977	65 585 000	3,203,000	1,323,000	1,880,000	48.1	19.9	28.2	6.86	133.8
1978	67 594 000	3,308,000	1,340,000	1,968,000	48.2	19.5	28.7	6.92	130.7
1979	69 673 000	3,385,000	1,367,000	2,017,000	47.9	19.3	28.5	6.89	128.1
1980	71 828 000	3,460,000	1,397,000	2,063,000	47.5	19.2	28.3	6.85	126.1
1981	74 075 000	3,537,000	1,426,000	2,111,000	47.1	19.0	28.1	6.82	124.4
1982	76 276 000	3,613,000	1,462,000	2,151,000	46.7	18.9	27.8	6.80	123.5
1983	78 500 000	3,704,000	1,494,000	2,210,000	46.5	18.8	27.8	6.78	123.1
1984	80 203 000	3,726,000	1,524,000	2,202,000	45.8	18.7	27.1	6.70	123.2
1985	82 472 000	3,777,000	1,571,000	2,206,000	45.2	18.8	26.4	6.62	123.5
1986	84 698 000	3,824,000	1,624,000	2,200,000	44.6	18.9	25.6	6.56	123.9
1987	86 910 000	3,884,000	1,656,000	2,228,000	44.1	18.8	25.3	6.50	124.3
1988	89 178 000	3,963,000	1,689,000	2,274,000	43.9	18.7	25.2	6.50	124.6
1989	91 525 000	4,080,000	1,723,000	2,357,000	44.0	18.6	25.4	6.49	124.6
1990	93 963 000	4,168,000	1,773,000	2,395,000	43.8	18.6	25.2	6.46	124.5
1991	96 465 000	4,266,000	1,839,000	2,428,000	43.7	18.8	24.9	6.43	124.4
1992	98 906 000	4,373,000	1,884,000	2,489,000	43.7	18.8	24.9	6.39	123.9
1993	101 458 000	4,495,000	1,922,000	2,573,000	43.7	18.7	25.0	6.35	123.4
1994	104 092 000	4,619,000	1,989,000	2,629,000	43.8	18.9	24.9	6.32	122.6
1995	106 820 000	4,732,000	2,040,000	2,692,000	43.7	18.9	24.9	6.27	121.6
1996	109 555 000	4,828,000	2,081,000	2,747,000	43.5	18.8	24.8	6.22	120.3
1997	112 357 000	4,910,000	2,108,000	2,801,000	43.2	18.5	24.6	6.14	118.4
1998	115 225 000	5,002,000	2,134,000	2,868,000	42.9	18.3	24.6	6.07	116.2
1999	118 156 000	5,177,000	2,138,000	3,039,000	43.2	17.9	25.4	6.08	113.7
2000	121 235 000	5,345,000	2,146,000	3,199,000	43.5	17.5	26.0	6.12	110.9
2001	124 468 000	5,496,000	2,165,000	3,331,000	43.6	17.2	26.4	6.14	108.1
2002	127 837 000	5,645,000	2,192,000	3,453,000	43.6	16.9	26.6	6.14	105.2
2003	131 329 000	5,779,000	2,202,000	3,577,000	43.4	16.5	26.9	6.12	102.3
2004	134 910 000	5,902,000	2,225,000	3,676,000	43.2	16.3	26.9	6.09	99.5
2005	138,603,000	6,054,000	2,232,000	3,822,000	43.1	15.9	27.2	6.07	96.6
2006	142,378,000	6,191,000	2,247,000	3,945,000	42.9	15.6	27.3	6.08	94.0
2007	146,281,000	6,337,000	2,273,000	4,064,000	42.7	15.3	27.4	6.08	91.7
2008	150,307,000	6,506,000	2,311,000	4,195,000	42.7	15.2	27.5	6.08	89.6
2009	154,458,000	6,645,000	2,321,000	4,323,000	42.4	14.8	27.6	6.04	87.8
2010	158,733,000	6,776,000	2,355,000	4,421,000	42.1	14.6	27.5	5.98	86.4
2011	163,173,000	6,916,000	2,372,000	4,544,000	41.8	14.3	27.5	5.92	85.1
2012	167,755,000	7,014,000	2,414,000	4,600,000	41.2	14.2	27.0	5.83	84.0
2013	172,397,000	7,095,000	2,447,000	4,648,000	40.6	14.0	26.6	5.74	83.1
2014	177,055,000	7,189,000	2,493,000	4,697,000	40.1	13.9	26.2	5.66	82.4
2015	181,703,000	7,273,000	2,541,000	4,732,000	39.5	13.8	25.7	5.62	81.6
2016	186,289,000	7,384,000	2,574,000	4,810,000	39.1	13.6	25.5	5.58	80.6
2017	191,045,000	7,487,000	2,600,000	4,887,000	38.7	13.4	25.3	5.52	79.4
2018	195,947,000	7,590,000	2,627,000	4,963,000	38.2	13.2	25.0	5.45	77.9
2019	200,828,000	7,698,000	2,642,000	5,056,000	37.8	13.0	24.9	5.38	76.3
2020	205,781,000	7,806,000	2,708,000	5,098,000	37.5	13.0	24.5	5.31	74.7
2021	218,529,000	7,331,000	2,689,000	4,556,000	33.5	12.3	20.9	4.64	73.0
2022	223,151,000	7,407,000	2,667,000	4,688,000	33.2	12.0	21.0	4.55	71.2
2023	227,883,000	7,510,000	2,675,000	4,776,000	33.0	11.7	21.0	4.48	69.5
2024					32.5	11.6	20.9	4.38	
2025					32.2	11.6	20.6	4.30	
2026									
* CBR = crude birth rate (per 1000); CDR = crude death rate (per 1000); NC = natural change (per 1000); IMR = infant mortality rate per 1000 births; TFR = total fertility rate (number of children per woman)

=== Demographic and health surveys ===
Total fertility rate (TFR) (Wanted TFR) and crude birth rate (CBR):

Year	Total		Urban		Rural	
Year	CBR	TFR	CBR	TFR	CBR	TFR
1960	47	6.35				
1965–66	45.9	6.44				
1967–69	46.1	6.42				
1970	46.3	6.47				
1971–73	46.7	6.57				
1975	47.2	6.71				
1978–82	47	6.78				
1978–80	47	6.76				
1981–82	46.68	6.78				
1983–86	45.67	6.7				
1987–90	45.9	6.57				
1990	44.2	6.49 (5.8)	34	5.033 (4.8)	40	6.326 (6.1)
1999	43.2	6.13	35.6	4.50	38.5	5.44
2003	42.8	6.04 (5.3)	36.3	4.9 (4.6)	44.5	6.1 (5.7)
2004–07	42.4	5.97				
2008	41.8	5.9 (5.3)	36.8	4.7 (4.4)	42.5	6.3 (5.8)
2013	40.2	5.5 (4.8)	35	4.7 (4.1)	42	6.2 (5.3)
2014–15	39.5	5.57				
2018	38	5.3 (4.8)	34	4.5 (4.0)	42	5.9 (5.4)
2021		4.8				
2023-24	33	4.8 (4.3)	29	3.9 (3.4)	38	5.6 (5.1)
2025-26	31.2	4.2	26.8	3.6	35	4.9

Year	TFR
1981–1982	6.8
1990	6.4
2003	6.0
2008	5.9
2013	5.7
2018	5.3
2021	4.8
2023-24	4.8

Variable	TFR (Wanted TFR) (2003)	TFR (Wanted TFR) (2008)	TFR (Wanted TFR) (2013)	TFR (Wanted TFR) (2018)	TFR (Wanted TFR) (2023-24)
Nigeria	5.7 (5.3)	5.7 (5.3)	5.5 (4.8)	5.3 (4.8)	4.8 (4.3)
Urban	4.9 (4.6)	4.7 (4.4)	4.7 (4.1)	4.5 (4.0)	3.9 (3.4)
Rural	6.1 (5.7)	6.3 (5.8)	6.2 (5.3)	5.9 (5.4)	5.6 (5.1)
Region – North Central	5.7	5.4	5.3	5.0 (4.7)	4.2 (3.9)
Region – North East	7.0	7.2	6.3	6.1 (5.6)	6.1 (5.2)
Region – North West	6.7	7.3	6.7	6.6 (5.9)	5.9 (5.3)
Region – South East	4.1	4.8	4.7	4.7 (4.3)	4.1 (3.7)
Region – South South	4.6	4.7	4.3	4.0 (3.6)	3.3 (2.9)
Region – South West	4.1	4.5	4.6	3.9 (3.5)	3.4 (3.1)

Fertility data as of 2013 (DHS Program):

State	Total fertility rate	Percentage of women age 15–49 currently pregnant	Mean number of children ever born to women age 40–49
Abuja	3.8	8.3	4.7
Benue	5.2	13.0	6.8
Kogi	4.2	9.4	5.7
Kwara	5.1	7.2	5.2
Nasarawa	5.4	10.8	5.8
Niger	6.1	14.8	5.8
Plateau	5.4	11.2	5.6
Adamawa	5.8	15.6	6.7
Bauchi	8.1	16.9	8.4
Borno	4.7	12.7	5.2
Gombe	7.0	14.3	7.9
Taraba	6.0	10.6	7.1
Yobe	6.6	13.4	7.4
Jigawa	7.6	15.1	7.6
Kaduna	4.1	21.0	5.7
Kano	6.8	12.6	7.7
Katsina	7.4	17.3	8.4
Kebbi	6.7	16.9	8.2
Sokoto	7.0	14.1	7.3
Zamfara	8.4	17.0	8.7
Abia	4.2	7.3	5.0
Anambra	4.2	6.0	4.7
Ebonyi	5.3	9.1	7.1
Enugu	4.8	8.4	5.9
Imo	4.8	8.3	5.0
Akwa Ibom	3.9	5.3	5.4
Bayelsa	4.5	11.3	6.1
Cross River	5.4	9.1	5.5
Delta	4.1	10.6	5.6
Edo	4.4	6.3	5.7
Rivers	3.8	9.5	4.9
Ekiti	4.3	7.0	5.2
Lagos	4.1	7.2	4.3
Ogun	5.4	10.6	4.9
Ondo	5.2	9.1	5.2
Osun	4.1	6.8	4.3
Oyo	4.5	11.9	5.1

Source: Demographic and Health Surveys (DHS)

==== Fertility rate by state ====
Variable	TFR						
Variable	2008	2011*	2013	2016*	2018	2021*	2024
Nigeria	5.7	5.7	5.5	5.8	5.3	4.6	4.8
Urban	4.7	4.7	4.7	4.9	4.5	3.6	3.9
Rural	6.3	6.3	6.2	6.3	5.9	5.4	5.6
Region – North Central	5.4	4.9	5.3	5.3	5.0	4.1	4.2
Abuja (FCT)	4.0	3.8	4.5	4.6	4.3	3.2	3.2
Benue	5.9	4.9	5.2	4.8	4.5	4.3	3.5
Kogi	4.2	3.9	4.2	3.7	4.8	3.3	4.9
Kwara	4.5	5.1	5.1	4.4	5.2	3.7	4.0
Nasarawa	4.7	5.5	5.4	5.7	5.3	4.5	4.3
Niger	7.5	6.1	6.1	6.4	5.8	4.6	4.4
Plateau	5.3	4.5	5.4	5.6	4.7	4.4	4.4
Region – North East	7.2	6.7	6.3	6.4	6.1	5.6	6.1
Adamawa	6.8	5.6	5.8	5.5	6.1	4.2	5.3
Bauchi	8.1	8.6	8.1	6.8	7.2	6.5	6.2
Borno	7.1	6.7	4.7	6.1	5.2	5.9	6.5
Gombe	7.4	5.6	7.0	7.3	6.6	5.3	5.5
Taraba	5.9	5.3	6.0	5.5	5.4	4.9	5.2
Yobe	7.5	7.9	6.6	6.8	5.9	6.1	7.5
Region – North West	7.3	7.2	6.7	7.3	6.6	6.3	5.9
Jigawa	7.1	6.7	7.6	8.5	7.1	7.6	6.9
Kaduna	6.3	7.9	4.1	5.6	5.9	5.7	5.6
Kano	8.1	7.5	6.8	7.7	6.5	6.4	5.8
Katsina	7.2	8.2	7.4	7.5	7.3	7.4	5.7
Kebbi	6.0	7.0	6.7	7.7	6.5	6.6	6.6
Sokoto	8.7	5.2	7.0	7.3	7.0	5.2	5.4
Zamfara	7.5	6.5	8.4	7.3	6.4	5.3	6.3
Region – South East	4.8	5.1	4.7	4.6	4.7	3.5	4.1
Abia	4.4	5.2	4.2	5.1	4.9	4.1	3.7
Anambra	5.0	5.7	4.2	4.3	4.7	3.0	3.7
Ebonyi	5.6	6.1	5.3	5.2	5.4	3.7	4.7
Enugu	4.4	4.3	4.8	3.8	4.1	3.4	3.5
Imo	4.8	4.6	4.8	5.1	4.5	3.6	4.4
Region – South South	4.7	4.9	4.3	4.3	4.0	3.5	3.3
Akwa Ibom	4.0	4.0	3.9	4.5	3.6	3.6	3.3
Bayelsa	5.8	6.7	4.5	4.8	4.4	4.2	3.8
Cross River	5.4	5.8	5.4	4.4	3.7	3.1	3.0
Delta	4.5	5.3	4.1	5.2	4.4	4.0	3.7
Edo	5.3	5.3	4.4	3.8	4.8	3.2	3.3
Rivers	4.3	4.3	3.8	3.3	3.9	3.1	2.9
Region – South West	4.5	5.1	4.6	4.4	3.9	3.7	3.4
Ekiti	5.0	4.8	4.3	4.4	4.6	3.9	3.8
Lagos	4.0	4.7	4.1	4.0	3.4	3.2	3.2
Ogun	5.4	5.6	5.4	4.5	3.8	4.8	4.1
Ondo	4.9	3.9	5.2	4.5	4.1	3.6	3.1
Osun	4.0	4.9	4.1	4.7	3.8	3.5	3.3
Oyo	5.0	6.4	4.5	4.9	4.5	3.7	3.3
	2008	2011*	2013	2016*	2018	2021*	2024

∗ MICS surveys

==== Contraceptive prevalence ====
Year	1982	1990	1994	1999	2003	2007	2008	2011	2012	2013	2016	2017
% of women ages 15–49	6.8%	6.0%	13.4%	15.3%	12.6%	14.7%	14.6%	14.1%	13.5%	15.1%	20.4%	13.4%

∗ UNICEFs state of the worlds children and child info, United Nations population divisions world contraceptive use, household surveys including demographic and health surveys and multiple indicator cluster surveys.

=== Life expectancy at birth ===
Nigeria currently has the lowest life expectancy in the world. Data from 1950 to 2015 (UN World Population Prospects):

Life expectancy in Nigeria since 1950

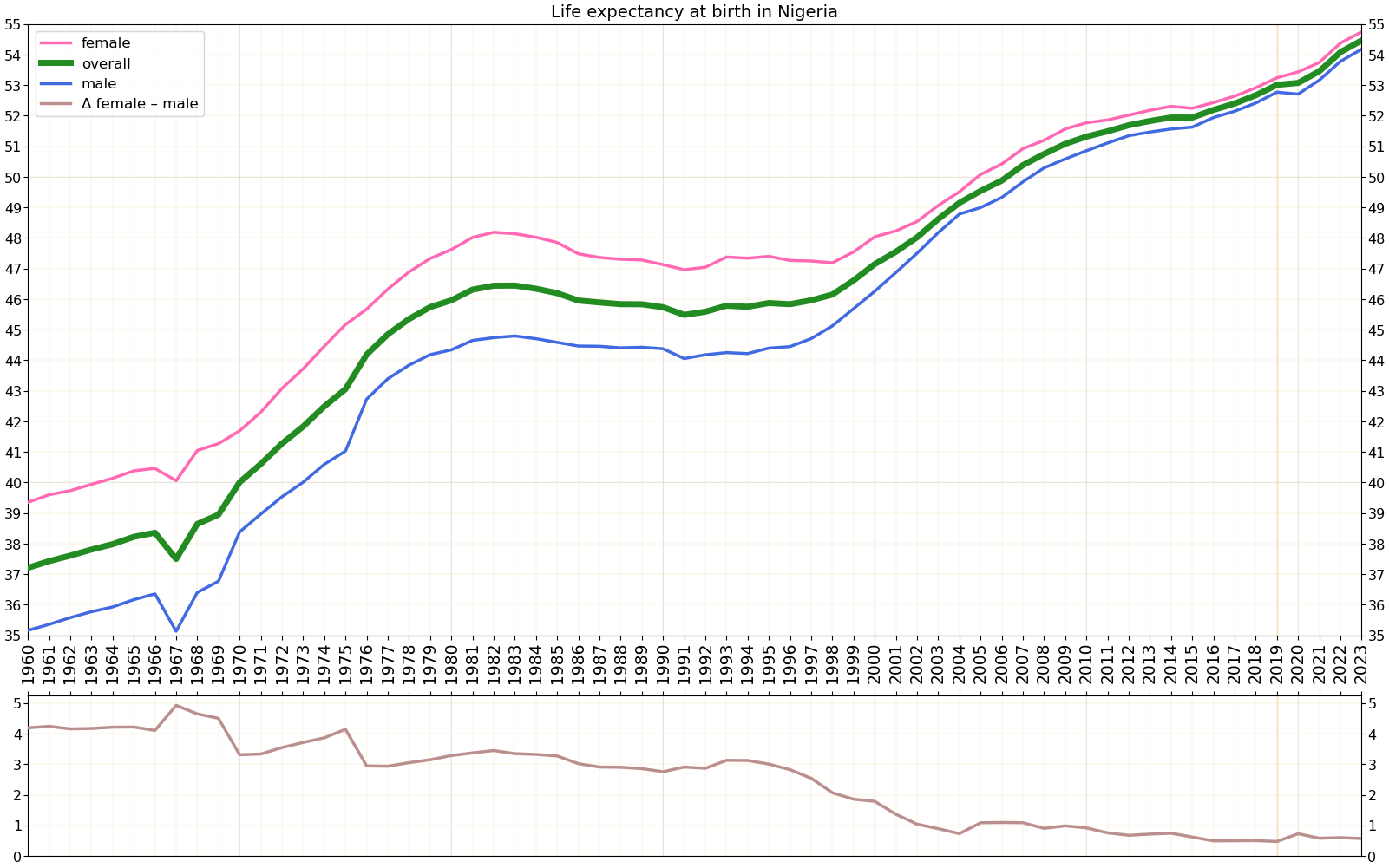
Life expectancy in Nigeria since 1960 by gender

Period	Life expectancy in Years
1950–1955	33.81
1955–1960	▲35.80
1960–1965	▲38.13
1965–1970	▲39.97
1970–1975	▲42.03
1975–1980	▲44.29
1980–1985	▲46.02
1985–1990	▼45.95
1990–1995	▼45.87
1995–2000	▲46.00
2000–2005	▲46.94
2005–2010	▲49.75
2010–2015	▲51.88
2022	▲53.63

== Ethnic groups ==
Ethnic groups of Nigeria (2018 est.)
Ethnic groups	percent
Hausa	30.0%
Yoruba	15.5%
Igbo	15.2%
Fulani	6.0%
Tiv	2.4%
Kanuri	2.4%
Ibibio	1.8%
Ijaw	1.8%
Other	24.7%

== Emigration ==
Today millions of ethnic Nigerians live abroad, the largest communities can be found in the United Kingdom (500,000–3,000,000) and the United States (600,000–1,000,000 Nigerians), other countries that followed closely are South Africa, Gambia, and Canada respectively. There are also large groups in Ireland, Portugal and many other countries. Inspiration for emigration is based heavily on socio-economical issues such as warfare, insecurity, economical instability and civil unrest.

Between 1400 and 1900, of 1.4 million of 2 million emigrants were slaves sent to the Americas with the other 600,000 being sent to other destinations via the trans-Saharan, Red Sea and Indian Ocean routes. This is due to the fact that the land now known as Nigeria was a central point for 4 slave trades during the 19th century. Though bondage represented a great deal, an estimated 30,000 Nigerian inhabitants would relocate to Kano City and Gambia to take advantage of financial opportunities afforded by fertile land and available natural resources. What's more, the presence of gold mines and rail lines along the Gold Coast, present-day Ghana, attracted an estimated 6,500 Nigerian citizens to attain financial gain and opportunity. The population of Nigerians in Ghana rose to roughly 149,000 before the 1969 alien expulsion order would displace nearly the entire population to surrounding countries.

== Religion ==
According to Pew Research Center, the population in 2015 was 50% Muslim, 48.1% Christian and approximately 2% other.

Nigeria is nearly equally divided between Islam and Christianity. The majority of Nigerian Muslims are Sunni and mostly live in the northern, central and south-western states of the country, while Christians dominate in some central states (especially Plateau and Benue states), and the south-east and south-south regions. Other religions practised in Nigeria include African Traditional Religion, Hinduism, Baháʼí Faith, Judaism, The Grail Movement, and the Reformed Ògbóni Fraternity, one of the traditional socio-religious institutions of the Yorùbá people and their Òrìṣà religion known as Ẹ̀sìn Òrìṣà Ìbílẹ̀ in the Yorùbá language.

According to a 2009 Pew survey, 50.4% of Nigeria's population were Muslims. A later Pew study in 2011 calculated that Christians now formed 50.8% of the population. Adherents of other religions made up 1% of the population.

The shift of population balance between Muslims and Christians is a result of northern and southern Nigeria being in different stages of demographic transition. The Muslim-dominated north is in an earlier stage of the demographic transition with much higher fertility rates than the south, whose split Christian/Muslim population is further along in the transition, and whose fertility rates are declining. Decreasing fertility can be linked to more access to education, use of contraceptives, and differing beliefs regarding family planning.

The 1999 introduction of Sharia law in twelve northern Nigerian states led to massive violence and unrest and caused an ethnic and religious rift between Sharia and Non-Sharia states, a divide that has deepened with time.

== See also ==
- 2023 census of Nigeria
- National Bureau of Statistics of Nigeria
