= Diket Plang =

Nigerian politician (born 1972)

Senator for Plateau Central
- Incumbent
- Assumed office 13 June 2023
- Preceded by: Hezekiah Dimka

Personal details
- Born: 12 December 1972 (age 53)
- Party: All Progressive Congress
- Occupation: Politician

Diket Plang (born 12 December 1972) is a Nigerian politician who has served as the senator representing the Plateau Central senatorial district since 2023.
