= Pam Mwadkon Dachungyang =

Nigerian politician (born 1962)

Senator for Plateau North
- Incumbent
- Assumed office 13 February 2024
- Preceded by: Simon Davou Mwadkwon

Personal details
- Born: 14 September 1962 (age 63)
- Party: Action Democratic Party
- Occupation: Politician; journalist

Pam Mwadkon Dachungyang (born 14 September 1962) is a Nigerian journalist and politician who has served as the senator representing the Plateau North senatorial district since 2024.

Dachungyang is from a royal family in Riyom.

On 3 February 2024, Dachungyang was elected senator from Plateau North by receiving 122,442 votes in the 2024 Plateau North senatorial district bye-elections and was eventually declared winner by the Independent National Electoral Commission's returning officer, Professor Nestor Chagok. He was sworn into the Nigerian Senate with two others by Senate president Godswill Akpabio on 13 February 2024.

He was one among dignitaries officially invited by Plateau State Government for the inauguration of twin theater suite at Jos University Teaching Hospital(JUTH) on 3 April 2024.
