= Yero Ibrahim Bello =

Nigerian politician and teacher

Yero Ibrahim Bello is a Nigerian politician, teacher, and lawmaker from Plateau State in Nigeria. Bello was born on 9 February 1962 in Plateau State. He is married.

Bello graduated from Ahmadu Bello University, Zaria.

He is a politician and a teacher. From 1999 to 2003, he represented the Wase constituency in the House of Representatives.
