= Simon Davou Mwadkwon =

Nigerian politician (born 1968)

Distinguished Senator Simon Davou Mwadkwon

Senate Minority Leader
- In office 4 July 2023 – 23 October 2023
- Preceded by: Philips Tanimu Aduda
- Succeeded by: Abba Moro

Senator of the Federal Republic of Nigeria
- In office 13 June 2023 – 23 October 2023
- Preceded by: Istifanus Gyang
- Succeeded by: Pam Mwadkon Dachungyang
- Constituency: Plateau North Senatorial District

Personal details
- Born: 25 July 1968 (age 58)
- Party: APC
- Occupation: Politician; educationist
- Profession: educationist

Simon Davou Mwadkwon (born 25 July 1968) is a Nigerian politician and educationist who served as minority leader of the Nigerian Senate from July to October 2023. He was the senator representing Plateau North senatorial district from June 2023 until he was sacked by an Appeal Court in October 2023.

On 3 February 2024, hours before the rerun election ordered by an appeal court, Mwadkwon and other top leaders of the Peoples Democratic Party (PDP) in Plateau State decided to endorse the Action Democratic Party (ADP) candidate, Prince Pam Mwadkon Dachungyang, for the Plateau North senatorial district rerun after the exclusion of their party from the ballot became public information.
