= David Ishaya Lalu =

Nigerian politician

David Ishaya Lalu is a Nigerian politician. He currently serves as the Federal Representative representing Bokkos/Mangu constituency of Plateau State in the 10th National Assembly.
