= Musa Agah =

Nigerian politician

Musa Agah is a Nigerian politician and a member representing Jos North/Bassa Federal Constituency in Plateau State under the platform of Peoples Democratic Party (PDP).
