= Effiom Ekeng Edet =

Nigerian politician

Member of the Cross River State House of Assembly
- In office 2022–2023
- Constituency: Akpabuyo

Personal details
- Born: Cross River State, Nigeria
- Party: Peoples Democratic Party (PDP)
- Occupation: Politician

Effiom Ekeng Edet is a Nigerian politician from the PDP.

== Political career ==
Effiom Ekeng Edet contested the Akpabuyo State Constituency by-election in 2022 as the candidate of the Peoples Democratic Party (PDP). The election was held on 26 February 2022 to fill the seat left vacant by the death of Elizabeth Edem Ironbar. He won the by-election with 5,866 votes, while the All Progressives Congress (APC) candidate, Bassey Ekpo, received 5,363 votes. He became the member representing Akpabuyo State Constituency in the Cross River State House of Assembly.

== Early life and education ==
Effiom Ekeng Edet was born in 1961 in Cross River State, Nigeria. According to the Independent National Electoral Commission's 2022 election records, his qualifications included the First School Leaving Certificate, General Certificate of Education, Bachelor of Science, Master of Science and Doctor of Philosophy.
