= Next Nigerian census =

National census

Next census of Nigeria
- TBD

General information
- Country: Nigeria
- Topics: Census topics: People and population; Families and living arrangements; Nationality; Education; Economic Characteristics
- Authority: National Population; Commission of Nigeria
- Website: nationalpopulation.gov.ng

The next census of Nigeria will be a detailed enumeration of the Nigerian population that will be the fifth national census in the country since Independence. Censuses in Nigeria have a controversial history and the next census will be the first national census held since 2006. Over 190 Billion Naira (₦) has been allocated for the exercise. The help of the Nigeria Security and Civil Defence Corps (NSCDC) has been requested by the Chairman of the National Population Commission (NPC) in order to provide security. The census will also be notable for being the first digital census in Nigeria's history. The plan is to use GIS technologies such as ArcGIS to aid with the planning process.

Originally scheduled for 2016, the census was repeatedly delayed. In April 2023, the census was postponed indefinitely by the Buhari administration in order to allow the new administration to pick a date. By April 2024, there was still no proposed date, although the 17 new commissioners were sworn in and produced a recommended date for President Tinubu. In July, the National Population Commission proposed a date of November 2024, but are still awaiting President Tinubu's approval. There are concerns surrounding the use and management of the 200 billion Naira allocated for the next census, with the House of Representatives requesting an investigation. Others, are calling for the Census to be delayed to more peaceful times due to the potential tension over population figures due to state revenue figures and representation in the House of Representatives deriving from population numbers.

== See also ==
- Demographics of Nigeria
