= Muhammad Ahmad (Nigerian politician) =

Nigerian politician (died 2021)

Member of the Zamfara State House of Assembly
- Constituency: Shinkafi

Chairman, House Committee on Finance and Appropriation

Personal details
- Died: 29 June 2021 Near Sheme, Katsina State, Nigeria
- Cause of death: Killed in a bandit attack
- Party: All Progressives Congress

Muhammad Ahmad (died 29 June 2021), also known as Walin Jangeru, was a Nigerian politician who represented the Shinkafi constituency in the Zamfara State House of Assembly. He served as Chairman of the House Committee on Finance and Appropriation until his death in 2021.

== Career ==
Before entering politics, Ahmad worked as a lecturer at the College of Education in Sokoto State. He later served as a secretary in local government administration and as Vice Chairman of Shinkafi Local Government.

Ahmad was elected to represent Shinkafi constituency in the Zamfara State House of Assembly, where he served three terms. During his tenure, he chaired the House Committee on Finance and Appropriation.

On 29 June 2021, he attended the reception held in Gusau following Governor Bello Matawalle's defection to the All Progressives Congress.

== Death ==
Ahmad was killed by armed bandits on 29 June 2021 along the Sheme–Funtua Road in Katsina State while travelling from Gusau. His son and driver were abducted during the attack.

His death was confirmed by officials of the Zamfara State House of Assembly.
