= Dachung Musa Bagos =

Nigerian politician

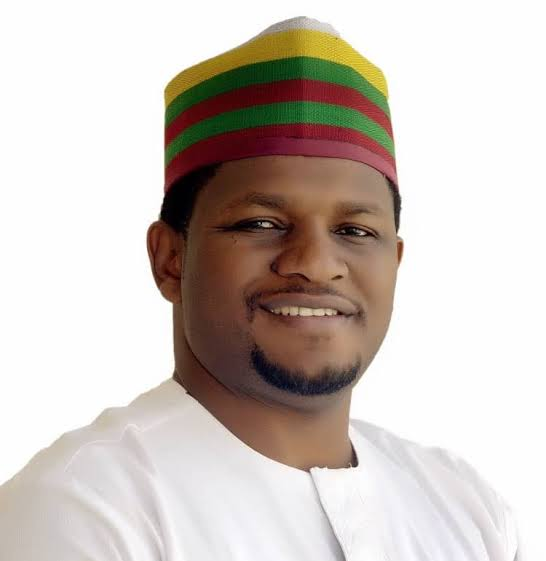

Personal details
- Born: 4 June 1977 (age 49) Apata, Jos, Plateau State
- Party: Peoples Democratic Party
- Education: University of Jos, Jos ECWA Theological Seminary
- Occupation: Politician

Dachung Musa Bagos (born 4 June 1977) is a Nigerian politician who is a member of the Peoples Democratic Party from Plateau State, Nigeria. He is a member of the Nigeria Federal House of Representatives from Jos South/Jos East federal constituency of Plateau State in the 9th National Assembly. He was elected to the House in 2019. Bagos was re-elected into the Federal House of Representatives for the second time in the 2023 general election.

== Education ==
After studying at Ekan Primary School, he obtained his tertiary education at the Jos Development Enterprise Commercial School where he received a Diploma in Secretariat Administration. Dachung proceeded to the University of Jos where he obtained a Diploma in Law and subsequently, the Jos ECWA Theological Seminary to broaden his spectrum of Education and knowledge.

== Personal life and philanthropy ==
To improve the educational quality of his constituency, Honorable Dachung Musa Bagos has commissioned two modern classrooms with office, store and solar power for pupils of Gwandang LEA Primary School, Bukuru-Gyel of Jos South LGA of Plateau State. He has also paid school fees for female students of Government Technical College Bukuru and distributes hundreds of exercise books to the students of the institution. His foundation, Dachung Musa Bagos Foundation has given scholarship to 598 students of Government Secondary School Godong in Jos East LGA, and Government Secondary School Chugwi in Jos South LGA.

== See also ==
- Peoples Democratic Party (Nigeria)
- Plateau State
- National Assembly (Nigeria)
