= 2022 Imo-Rivers explosion =

- Date: 22 April 2022
- Location: Imo State, Rivers State, Nigeria
- Type: explosion and fire
- Deaths: 110
- Injuries: unknown

The Imo-Rivers explosion occurred at the site of an illegal oil refinery in Southern Nigeria on 22 April 2022. It happened late at night on the border between Imo State and Rivers State. Eyewitnesses described a loud noise followed by a huge fire that could be seen burning above the Abaezi forest. The initial death toll was thought to be around 60 people but as the days passed, more bodies were found, with the final estimate suggesting that 110 people died with over 100 more seriously injured. The casualties were predominantly young people who were probably working at the illegal refinery, with many suffering serious burns due to the resultant fire. The explosion and fire caused significant environmental damage.

== Background ==
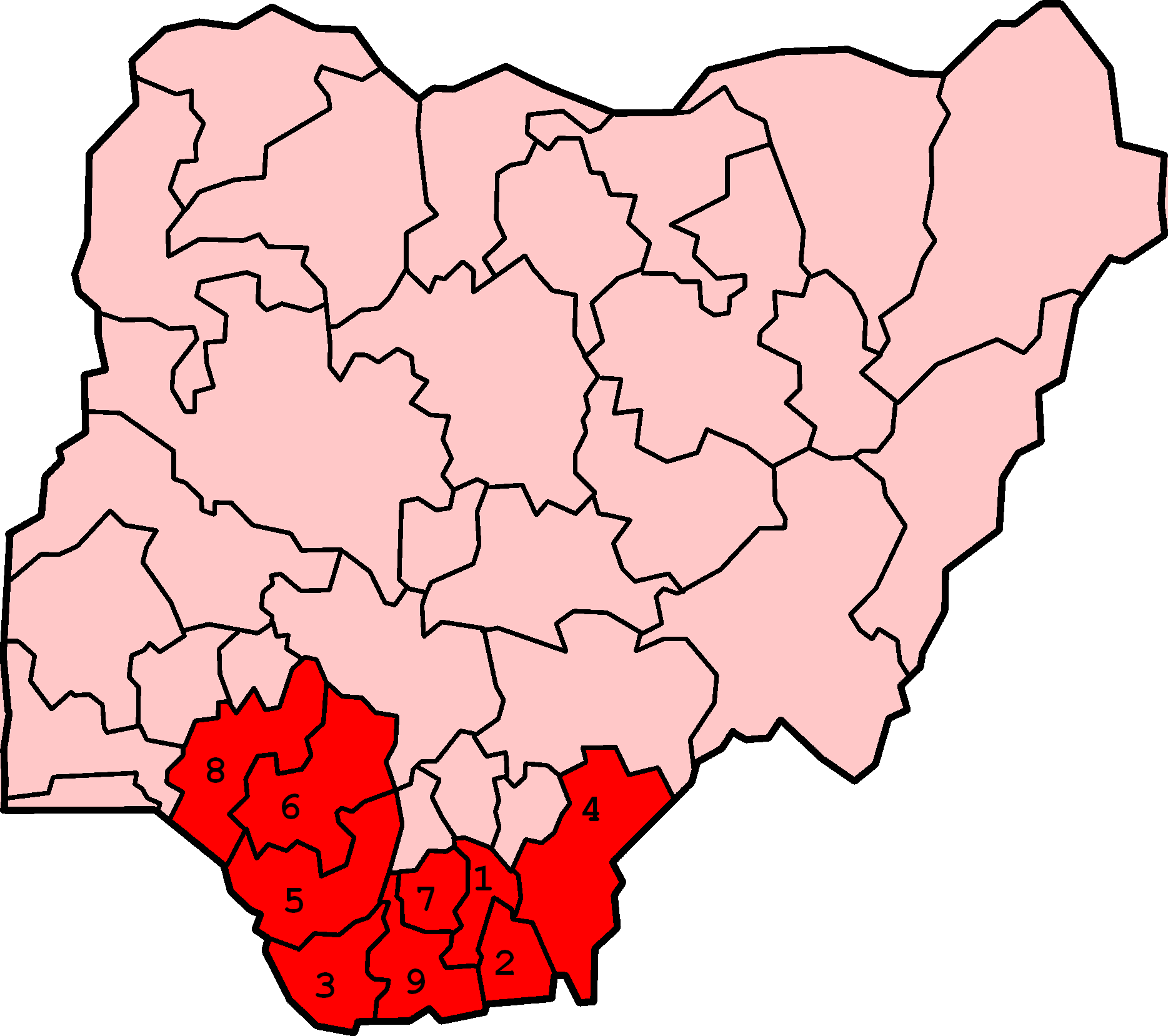
Map of Niger Delta with states numbered 1-9 1. Abia, 2. Akwa Ibom, 3. Bayelsa, 4. Cross River, 5. Delta, 6. Edo, 7.Imo, 8. Ondo, 9. Rivers

The country of Nigeria is responsible for the majority of oil production and export in West Africa with multiple official oil refineries throughout the Niger Delta area. Despite the high revenue generated by the oil refineries, little of that money finds its way into the local economy and unemployment and poverty are high. The official oil refineries do not always work to full capacity, so despite the large amount of oil produced, there are often shortages in the local area, with high prices being charged. The oil industry has been implicated in widespread pollution in the area, which impacts the health and livelihoods of local people.

As a consequence of unemployment and poverty, local people have turned to illegal oil refining or 'bunkering' as a way of obtaining fuel and making money, even though the dangers of this practice are known. Those running the illegal oil refineries drill down into the network of underground oil pipelines that run through this area and siphon off crude oil, storing this oil in containers hidden in the forests. There are frequent spillages that contaminate the ground and rivers, causing environmental damage. To produce the different fuel types such as kerosene and diesel, the crude oil is heated up to different temperatures and then cooled down. This process produces gas which is often burned off, contributing to further pollution. Because the process is unregulated and has few safety guards, accidents can cause explosions and fire, which is what probably happened on this occasion. From a financial perspective, it is estimated that the illegal oil trade is responsible for the loss of £2.4 billion ($3 billion) to the Nigerian economy per year.

Illegal oil refineries were very common in Rivers State, so in February 2022 the Rivers State Government started a clampdown on illegal bunkering sites with some success. This resulted in the activity moving over the border into Imo State where this explosion and fire occurred. Since the disaster, over 150 other bunkering sites have been identified in Imo State and there is some suspicion that law-enforcement agencies may be complicit in the bunkering industry, as the size and extent of the operations would have been difficult to hide.

== Geographical and physical impact ==
The 2022 Imo-Rivers explosion resulted in severe geographical and physical impacts across the boundary region between Imo and Rivers States in southeastern Nigeria. The blast occurred in the Abaezi forest, which spans the border of the Ohaji-Egbema Local Government Area of Imo State and Rivers State.

The explosion and ensuing fire were significant in human and environmental terms. The explosion caused numerous deaths, and additional remains were later discovered but were difficult to identify. Some victims died later in the hospital from severe burns sustained during the incident. Many of the charred bodies were carried away and laid to rest by families early on, while about 50 victims were buried in mass graves near the site due to the extent of the burns and the difficulty of identification. Others who survived sustained serious burn injuries, with many receiving treatment in hospital following the incident.

The explosion burned a substantial portion of the forest, leaving vegetation and surrounding materials with extensive fire damage, including ash, soot, and melted debris. The incident caused lasting effects on the local environment. The immediate area bore heavy physical damage. Burnt palm trees, cars, and vans were scattered around the forest clearing following the weekend explosion, providing evidence of the fire's intensity and the heat it generated. The explosion destroyed the improvised refining facilities and related equipment at the site. A Reuters journalist reported seeing scattered pieces of personal belongings, such as flip-flops, bags, and clothing, dispersed throughout the disaster area. This scattering of debris and destruction of personal property highlighted the physical impact and the scale of the explosion.

The soil and vegetation surrounding the epicentre were heavily contaminated by crude oil, soot, and unburned petroleum residue. Pools of thick black oil and tar-like deposits covered the ground, seeping into the soil and altering its structure. Contaminated runoff flowed into nearby streams, resulting in water pollution and the spread of hydrocarbons into local waterways. The incident further exacerbated the long-standing damage to fishing and farming that had already been caused by years of oil exploitation in the Niger Delta. The contamination of soil and water has reduced agricultural productivity and harmed aquatic life, deepening the environmental crisis faced by local communities that depend on these resources.

Air quality deteriorated sharply during and after the explosion. Dense black smoke containing soot, particulate matter, and volatile hydrocarbons filled the atmosphere, drifting over nearby settlements and creating respiratory hazards. The intense heat and prolonged burning released toxic fumes, leaving lingering smells of petroleum and charred organic material.

Despite periodic crackdowns, illegal refineries still litter the swamps, creeks, and waters of the impoverished Niger Delta, continuing to cause oil spills, fires, and environmental pollution.The 2022 Imo-Rivers explosion has been noted as highlighting the physical devastation and environmental degradation wrought by such secret operations. The once-forested area of Abaezi now bears visible scars of burned vegetation, damaged soils, and abandoned machinery, marking a landscape showing lasting changes resulting from the incident and the operations involved.

== Response ==
The Organization of the Petroleum Exporting Countries (OPEC), an intergovernmental organisation coordinating petroleum policies among member countries, issued a statement of condolences to the Imo State Government following the explosion. The Nigerian Red Cross Society conducted an assessment of the site two days after the incident.

Nigerian President Muhammadu Buhari described the event as a "catastrophe and a national disaster" and pledged that those responsible would be identified and prosecuted. The Imo State Government subsequently declared Okenze Onyenwoke, identified as the owner of the illegal oil refinery, wanted in connection with the explosion in the Abaezi community.

Reports indicated that other operators of illegal refineries expressed their intention to continue the business despite the risks, characterising the explosion as an uncommon rare occurrence among more than 150 bunkering sites. Some suggested that the tragedy may have resulted from errors made by oil buyers. Operators further alleged that such refineries could not function without the involvement of landowners, security personnel, and influential community leaders. One operator dismissed concerns regarding environmental pollution and health risks associated with illegal refining, stating that immediate survival needs outweighed ecological and health considerations.

An anonymous community leader expressed concern that environmental hazards resulting from illegal bunkering activities, including crop damage and water pollution, pose risks to public health, the natural environment, and local livelihoods. According to the leader, the issue has not received adequate coverage in the media.

Local officials and the Health of Mother Earth Foundation (HOMEF), an environmental coalition, attributed the persistence of illegal refineries to lax oversight by security agencies and inadequate protection of oil installations. President Buhari announced plans to intensify efforts to dismantle illegal refineries, a position echoed by Goodluck Opiah, Imo State Commissioner for Petroleum Resources, who emphasised the government's commitment to cracking down on oil bunkering activities. Tunji Oyebanji, chairman of the Lagos Chamber of Commerce and Industry’s Downstream Group, recommended stricter penalties to increase the economic risks for illegal operators and clients, thereby reducing incentives for participation.

HOMEF attributed the prevalence of illegal refining to unemployment and poverty, urging the government to provide alternative employment opportunities for youth. The organisation criticised reliance on military responses, arguing that such conditions make "death by roasting" appear to be a survival strategy for some residents of the Niger Delta. Local youth leader Bright Onyenwoke expressed similar views, noting that despite the dangers, many individuals were compelled to engage in illegal refining due to limited job opportunities.

Two years after the incident, the Nigerian National Petroleum Company Limited, the state-owned oil corporation, reported that 6,800 illegal refineries had been deactivated across Nigeria between 2022 and 2024.

== Short- and longer-term health consequences ==
The explosion caused immediate, life-threatening health impacts. Media and official reports estimated that more than 100 people were killed, many “burnt beyond recognition,” while dozens of survivors sustained severe thermal burns, crush injuries and smoke inhalation. Local clinics were quickly overwhelmed, highlighting existing gaps in emergency and critical-care capacity in this region of Nigeria.

Short-term survivors faced high risk of complications such as airway inflammation, chemical pneumonitis and infection. These conditions are difficult to manage where supplies of oxygen, analgesics and specialised burn-care units are limited. The health system strain observed after the explosion reflects broader inequalities in the Niger Delta, where residents have less access to advanced medical facilities and emergency services compared to other regions.

Long-term health risks arise from both the acute exposure during the fire and the chronic environmental contamination associated with artisanal oil refining. Studies in the Niger Delta have consistently documented elevated concentrations of polycyclic aromatic hydrocarbons (PAHs) and heavy metals in soil, water and air near refining sites—pollutants linked to chronic respiratory illness, dermatological problems and increased lifetime cancer risk. These risks disproportionately affect poorer communities living close to contaminated sites, illustrating how environmental degradation and socioeconomic inequalities shape health outcomes over time.

These long-term vulnerabilities are also reflected in wider assessments of the region. A major Amnesty International investigation found that chronic oil pollution in the Niger Delta contributes to elevated risks of cancer, respiratory illness, reproductive harms and other persistent health challenges, especially among impoverished communities living near contaminated land and waterways. The report further highlights how weak environmental regulation and slow clean-up processes magnify these long-term health burdens.

Psychological and social consequences are also expected. Sudden mass-casualty events are known to increase the risk of PTSD, Depression and anxiety, particularly when survivors experience severe burns, disfigurement or loss of family members. In the Niger Delta, where mental-health services are limited, such conditions may go undetected or untreated. The explosion therefore illustrates how weak Health systems, environmental hazards and socioeconomic inequalities interact to magnify health vulnerabilities. While the disaster prompted short-term attention, there is no publicly reported long-term health monitoring or environmental remediation programme, leaving affected communities at risk of sustained and poorly measured health impacts.

== Lessons learned ==
The Imo-Rivers Explosion shows that illegal oil refining poses a safety hazard, and observers have urged the government to take decisive action to resolve this issue. Illegal refining is attractive in parts of the Niger Delta, where oil resources are abundant. Despite measures taken by the authorities to curb them, such practices are still relatively easy to conduct. Official reports state that Nigeria, which is the largest producer and exporter of oil in Africa, loses about 200,000 barrels of oil every day. This loss, which is more than 10% of its total production, is mainly due to people stealing oil or damaging pipelines illegally. This means that oil and gas companies are commonly obligated to invoke force majeure regarding their export operations. This indicates that despite stricter regulatory measures from the government, the underlying problem continues to persist.

The incident has prompted the responsible authorities to exercise greater vigilance. Reports emphasise that greater awareness among both the public and the government is necessary due to the severity of the risks. According to reports, more than one hundred people died, and many cars and other property were destroyed. The scale of the illegal refinery operation suggests that it could not have functioned without the implicit consent of relevant individuals and departments. In fact, some of the vehicles were reportedly destroyed while waiting to purchase illegal fuel, which means that the facility was a well-known and active business within the community. It also reflects the general public's potential lack of awareness regarding its hazards, or alternatively, their inability

Furthermore, the local medical services were shown to lack the capacity to handle a casualty count of this magnitude. A witness said people with severe burns were rushed to the village health centre for treatment. But he said many victims were turned away by the health centre. The incident revealed shortcomings in the management and coordination of the local health system, which led to delays in treatment for some of the injured. In addition, the event highlights the importance of improving the local health system's capacity to respond to emergencies to enhance public health and safety.

The disaster also revealed the social and economic challenges in the Niger Delta region. The damage to fishing and farming caused by the oil industry over the decades and the failure to share the oil wealth has led some to lose the opportunity to make money. This situation has led some people to seek alternative sources of income. According to another report, illegal refining has become a major source of employment in the Niger Delta over the past decade, at the same time as unemployment rates have soared nationally. As the local oil industry has developed, local youth have lacked opportunities to make a living, which has led them to enter the industry even in the face of danger. The situation indicates that solutions focusing solely on illegal activities may not address the underlying conditions. Combined with the public acceptance of illegal oil mentioned above, observers can infer that local economic development may be the culprit of these illegal activities. The incident shows that sustainable solutions could include economic development plans for the communities involved.
