= Timothy Golu =

Nigerian politician

Federal Representative
- In office 2011–2015
- Constituency: Pankshin/Kanam/Kanke

Personal details
- Education: University of Jos

Timothy Golu is a Nigerian Politician and Journalist. He was a former member of the National Assembly who represented Pankshin/Kanam/Kanke Federal Constituency of Plateau State in the 8th National Assembly.

== Early life and career ==
Timothy Golu was born in Sokoto State, Nigeria. He graduated with a degree in Political Science from the University of Jos in 1996 and later completed a Master’s degree in International Relations and Strategic Studies at the same university in 2007.

Golu began his journalism career in 2001 with Plateau Publishing Company Ltd. He later worked with Daily Times of Nigeria, National Interest, and Leadership Group of Newspapers, where he served as an editor at the State House, Aso Rock Villa.

In 2010, Golu resigned from journalism to run for the Plateau State House of Assembly, where he was elected to represent Kanke Constituency and served as Chief Whip from 2011 to 2015. He was later elected to the National Assembly to represent Pankshin, Kanke, and Kanam federal constituency, where he was appointed Chairman of the Committee on Legislative Budget and Research.

In 2024, Golu was appointed Special Adviser on Strategic Communications to Governor Caleb Mutfwang of Plateau State.
