= Ibrahim Naʼiddah =

Nigerian politician (1953–2022)

State Representative
- Constituency: Gusau East

Personal details
- Born: 1953
- Died: 29 January 2022 (aged 68–69)
- Occupation: Politician

Ibrahim Naʼiddah (1953 – 29 January 2022) was a Nigerian politician who represented Gusau East on the Zamfara State House of Assembly until his death.
