= Jude Ngaji =

Nigerian politician (born 1974)

Jude Ngaji is a Nigerian politician. He is a member representing Ogoja/Yala Federal Constituency in the House of Representatives.

== Early life and political career ==
Jude Ngajile was born in 1974 and hails from Cross River State. In 2022, he won the bye-election as a member representing Ogoja/Yala Federal Constituency under the platform of the All Progressive Congress (APC), after defeating his opponent Mike Usibe of the Peoples Democratic Party (PDP).
