= 2022 Edo State local elections =

Local elections in Nigeria

Local elections in Edo State will be held on 19 April 2022.
