= 2022 Katsina State local elections =

Local elections in Nigeria

Local elections in Katsina State, Nigeria was held on 11 April 2022. By Ogalah Ibrahim

The Katsina State Independent Electoral Commission (KTSIEC) has declared the All Progressive Congress APC, winner for all the chairmanship and councillorship seat in the 31 local governments so far announced for the April 11 local government election held in the state.
