= 2022 Kebbi State local elections =

State election in Nigeria

Local elections in Kebbi State were held on 5 February 2022. All 22 councils in the state were up for election.
