= 2022 Federal Capital Territory (Nigeria) local elections =

Local elections in the Federal Capital Territory of Nigeria were held on 12 February 2022. The three-year tenure of the Six Chairmen and 62 Councillors is set to expire in May 2022. The FCT is the only part of the country where the Independent National Electoral Commission is responsible for the conduct of Local Government election.
