= 2022 Imo State local elections =

Local Election in Nigeria

Local elections in Imo State in Nigeria were held on 12 March 2022. Elections were held across the 27 local government areas and 305 INEC wards across the state to elect local Government Councils and chairmen.

== Background ==
In 2021, Governor Hope Uzodinma announced his intention to hold local elections in accordance with the State Independent Electoral Commission.

== Results ==
All seats were won by the All Progressives Congress.
