= Elizabeth Edem Ironbar =

Nigerian politician (died 2021)

Lady Elizabeth Edem Ironbar

Member of the Cross River State House of Assembly
- In office 2015 – 26 October 2021
- Constituency: Akpabuyo

Personal details
- Died: 26 October 2021
- Party: PDP
- Occupation: Politician

Lady Elizabeth Edem Ironbar (died 26 October 2021) was a Nigerian politician from Cross River State. She was a member of the PDP and represented Akpabuyo on the Cross River State House of Assembly from 2015 until her death.

== Early life and education ==
Ironbar was from Akpabuyo Local Government Area of Cross River State, Nigeria.

== Political career ==
Ironbar was a Nigerian politician and a member of the People's Democratic Party (PDP). She represented the Akpabuyo constituency in the Cross River State House of Assembly from 2015 until her death in 2021.

== Death ==
Ironbar died on 26 October 2021 while serving as a member of the Cross River State House of Assembly.
