= Henry Longs =

Nigerian politician

State Representative
- Constituency: Pankshin South

Personal details
- Died: 28 November 2021
- Party: All Progressives Congress (APC)
- Occupation: Politician

Henry Longs (died 28 November 2021) was a Nigerian politician from the All Progressives Congress. He represented Pankshin South in the Plateau State House of Assembly.

In 2021 he died in Jos from complications during a leg operation.
