= 2022 Adamawa State local elections =

Elections in Nigeria

Local elections in Adamawa State, Nigeria, were held on 10 April 2022.

== Results ==
All 22 seats were won by the People's Democratic Party.
