= 2022 Enugu State local elections =

State election in Nigeria

Local elections in Enugu State were held on 23 February 2022. The Peoples Democratic Party won control of all 17 councils in the state.
