= Haruna Maitala =

Nigerian politician (died 2021)

Haruna Maitala (died 2 April 2021) was a Nigerian politician. He was member of the House of Representatives for the Jos North/Bassa Constituency, as a member of the All Progressives Congress.

In 2021, he was killed in a car accident on his way from Abuja to Jos. He died alongside his son and two others. He was replaced in a by-election by Musa Agah Avia.

== See also ==
- List of members of the House of Representatives of Nigeria, 2019–2023
