= 2022 Benue State local elections =

Local elections in Nigeria

Local elections in Benue State were held on 7 May 2022.
