= Adedayo Omolafe =

Nigerian politician (1964-2021)

- Born: 18 April 1964; Akure, Nigeria
- Died: 16 August 2021 (aged 57); Owo, Ondo State, Nigeria
- Occupation: Politician

Adedayo Isaac Omolafe (18 April 1964 – 16 August 2021) was a Nigerian politician and legislator of the Nigerian National Assembly. He represented Akure North/South federal constituency in the Nigerian House of Representatives. He hailed from Akure in the southwestern part of Nigeria. He was a member of the Peoples Democratic Party and was also known by the moniker, Expensive.

== Political career ==
He served as the councillor Representing Ward 2 (Ijomu/Obanla), Akure Local Government between 1995 and 1996 and as the supervisory councillor for health in Akure South Local Government in 2000.

In 2009, he served as the chairman of Akure South Local Government under the governorship of Olusegun Agagu.

He was elected into the 9th session of the Nigerian Federal House of Representatives to represent Akure North/South constituency.

Omolafe was referred to as a philanthropist for his programmes geared towards community empowerment. He was honored for his contributions to society by the Nigerian society for engineers.

== Death ==
He died on Monday 16 August 2021 at Federal Medical Centre Owo.
