= Hakeem Jamiu =

Nigerian politician

Hakeem Jamiu is a Nigerian politician. He currently serves as the State Representative for the Irepodun/Ifelodun II constituency in Ekiti State's legislature.
