= Ekiti State House of Assembly =

Legislative arm of the government of Ekiti State of Nigeria

- 6th Assembly

Type
- Type: Unicameral
- Term limits: 4 years

Leadership
- Speaker: Hon. Adeoye Stephen Aribasoye, All Progressives Congress

Structure
- Seats: 26
- Political groups: All Progressives Congress (25)

Elections
- Last election: 18 March 2023
- Next election: February 2027

Website
- https://www.ekitistate.gov.ng/executive-council/legislature

The Ekiti State House of Assembly is the legislative arm of the government of Ekiti State of Nigeria. It is a unicameral legislature with 26 members elected from the 16 local government areas (State Constituencies) of the state. Local government areas with considerable larger population are delineated into two constituencies to give equal representation. This makes the number of legislators in the Ekiti State House of Assembly 26.

The fundamental functions of the Assembly are to enact new laws, amend or repeal existing laws and oversight of the executive. Members of the assembly are elected for a term of four years concurrent with federal legislators (Senate and House of Representatives). The state assembly convenes three different days a week (Tuesdays, Wednesdays and Thursdays) for plenary sessions in the assembly complex within the state capital, Ado-Ekiti.

The current speaker of the 6th Ekiti State House of Assembly is Hon. Adeoye Stephen Aribasoye, who succeeded Bunmi Adelugba
