= 2023 Nigerian Senate elections in Ekiti State =

2023 Senate elections in Ekiti

2019 Nigerian Senate elections in Ekiti State
- 25 February 2023

All 3 Ekiti State seats in the Senate of Nigeria
| | Majority party | Minority party |
|---|---|---|
| Party | APC | PDP |
| Last election | 2 (Note: For the 2019 election for Ekiti South, Adebayo Clement Adeyeye of the APC was originally elected Senator and was sworn in alongside other senators in June of that year. However, a September 2019 National Assembly Election Petition Tribunal ruling and a subsequent Court of Appeal decision awarded the win to runner-up Abiodun Olujimi (PDP); she took office in November 2019.) | 1 |
| Seats before | 2 | 1 |
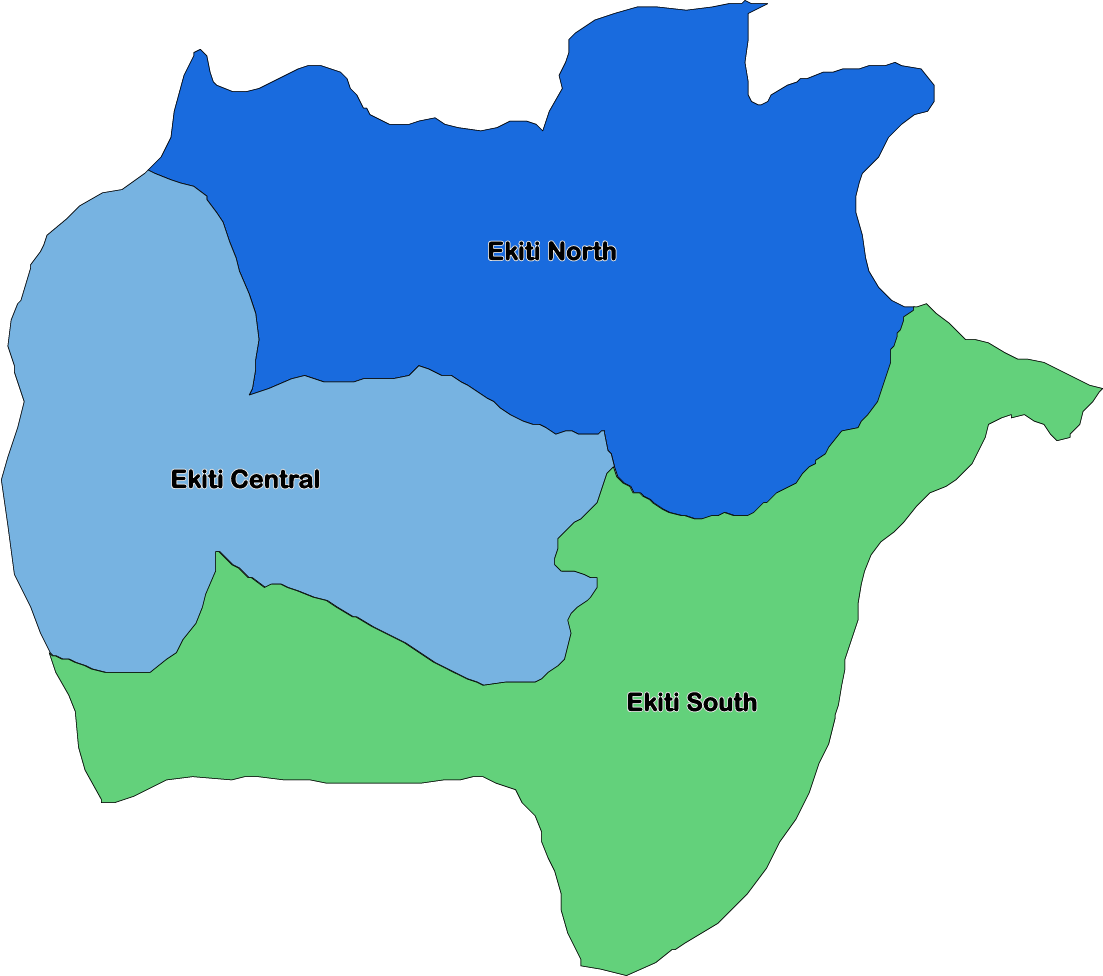
- APC incumbent retiring APC incumbent running for re-election PDP incumbent running for re-election

The 2023 Nigerian Senate elections in Ekiti State will be held on 25 February 2023, to elect the 3 federal Senators from Ekiti State, one from each of the state's three senatorial districts. The elections will coincide with the 2023 presidential election, as well as other elections to the Senate and elections to the House of Representatives; with state elections being held two weeks later. Primaries were held between 4 April and 9 June 2022.

== Background ==
In terms of the previous Senate elections, only one senator was returned: in the South district, Abiodun Olujimi (PDP) was re-elected after a court decision but Central Senator Fatimat Raji-Rasaki (PDP-turned-APC) lost renomination and North Senator Duro Faseyi (PDP) was unseated in the general election. In the Central district, Michael Opeyemi Bamidele held the seat for the APC with 65% of the vote and Olubunmi Ayodeji Adetunmbi (APC) defeated Faseyi with 55% in the North district; however, the South district's original results had Adebayo Clement Adeyeye winning but later court ruling awarded the win to Olujimi. These results were a part of a large swing to the Ekiti APC as every House of Representatives seat was gained by the party, it won a majority in the House of Assembly, and Buhari won the state in the presidential election.

During the 2019–2023 term, Olujimi and Bamidele both unsuccessfully ran for governor in 2022 with both withdrawing from their respective party primaries in protest of the primary conduct.

== Overview ==
| Affiliation | Party | | Total |
| Affiliation | APC | PDP | Total |
|---|---|---|---|
| Previous Election | 2 | 1 | 3 |
| Before Election | 1 | 2 | 3 |
| After Election | 3 | 0 | 3 |

== Summary ==
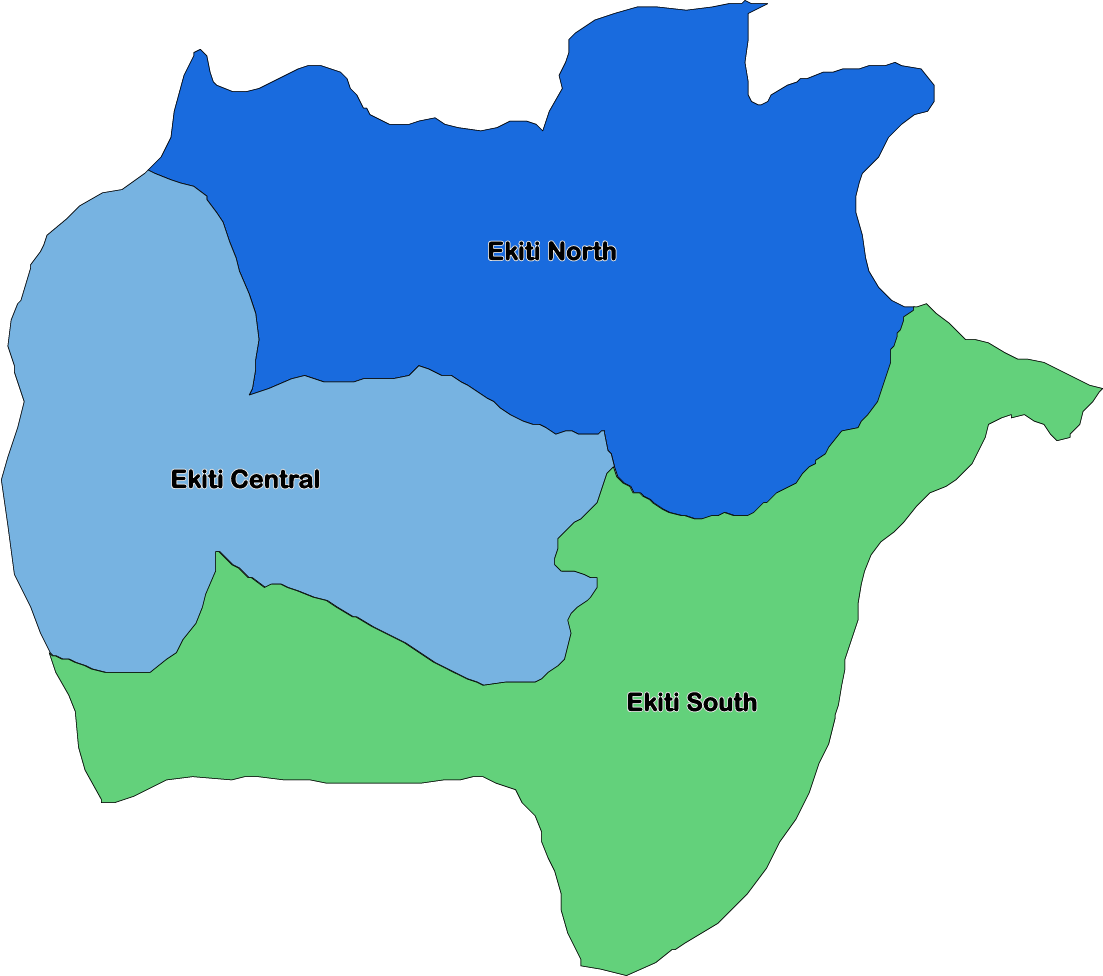
APC incumbent retiring APC incumbent running PDP incumbent running

| District | Incumbent | | Results | |
| District | Incumbent | Party | Status | Candidates |
|---|---|---|---|---|
| Ekiti Central | Michael Opeyemi Bamidele | APC | Incumbent re-elected | ▌ ✓ Michael Opeyemi Bamidele (APC); ▌Lateef Ajijola (PDP) |
| Ekiti North | Olubunmi Ayodeji Adetunmbi | APC | Incumbent lost renomination New member elected APC hold | ▌ ✓ Cyril Fasuyi (APC); ▌Funso Ayeni (PDP) |
| Ekiti South | Abiodun Olujimi | PDP | Incumbent lost re-election New member elected APC gain | ▌ ✓ Raphael Adeyemi Adaramodu (APC); ▌Abiodun Olujimi (PDP) |

== Ekiti Central ==
2023 Ekiti Central Senatorial District election
- 25 February 2023
| Nominee | Michael Opeyemi Bamidele | Lateef Ajijola |
| Party | APC | PDP |
Senator before election
Michael Opeyemi Bamidele
APC
Elected Senator
To be determined
To be determined

The Ekiti Central Senatorial District covers the local government areas of Ado Ekiti, Efon, Ekiti West, Ijero Ekiti, and Irepodun/Ifelodun. Incumbent Michael Opeyemi Bamidele (APC), who was elected with 65.4% of the vote in 2019, is seeking re-election.

=== Primary elections ===
==== All Progressives Congress ====
On 20 April 2022, the APC National Executive Committee announced the party's schedule for senatorial primaries, setting its expression of interest form price at ₦3 million and nomination form price at ₦17 million with a 50% discount for candidates younger than 40 while women and candidates with disabilities get free nomination forms. Forms were to be sold from 26 April to 6 May until the deadline was later extended to 10 May then 12 May. After the submission of nomination forms by 13 May, candidates were screened by a party committee on 14 and 15 May while 18 May was the date for the screening appeal process. Ward congresses and LGA congresses were set for 16 and 17 May to elect delegates for the primary. Candidates approved by the screening process advanced to a primary set for 27 May, in concurrence with other APC senatorial primaries; challenges to the result could be made on 28 May.

Before the primary, Bamidele initially faced a challenger, former Chief of Staff to Governor Kayode Fayemi Biodun Omoleye, but Omoleye later withdrew from the race. The primary in Aramoko-Ekiti in Ekiti West LGA resulted in Bamidele being renominated unopposed. After the primary, Bamidele thanked delegates along with then-Governor Kayode Fayemi, minister Niyi Adebayo, and other party leaders before vowing to help the development of the district.

==== People's Democratic Party ====
On 16 March 2022, the national PDP announced its senatorial primary timetable, setting its expression of interest form price at ₦1 million and the nomination form price at ₦20 million with a 50% discount for candidates between 25 and 30. Forms were to be sold until 1 April but the party later extended the deadline four times before reaching a final deadline of 22 April. After the submission of nomination forms by 25 April, candidates were screened by a party committee on 27 April while 2 May was the rescheduled date for the screening appeal process. Ward congresses were set for 29 April and LGA congresses were rescheduled for 10 May to elect delegates for the primary. Candidates approved by the screening process advanced to a primary set for 23 May, in concurrence with other PDP senatorial primaries but due to often violently enforced Monday stay-at-home orders by separatists, southeastern state parties held their primaries on 24 May; challenges to the result could be made on 25 May.

On the primary date, Lateef Ajijola—the 2015 PDP nominee for the seat—was nominated over Henry Kayode Ojo; reports from before and after the primary stated that former Governor Ayo Fayose backed Ajijola in an attempt to reconcile the state PDP after the two politicians had previously feuded.

=== General election ===
==== Results ====
2023 Ekiti Central Senatorial District election
| Party | Candidate | Votes | % |
|---|---|---|---|
| ADC | Feyisayo Omotunde Fajuyi | | |
| APC | Michael Opeyemi Bamidele | | |
| New Nigeria Peoples Party | Omotunde Fajuyi | | |
| PDP | Lateef Ajijola | | |
| SDP | David Olusesan Arowolo | | |
| ZLP | Olusola Akintola Osuntokun | | |
| Total votes | | | 100.00% |
| Invalid or blank votes | | | N/A |
| Turnout | | | |

== Ekiti North ==
2023 Ekiti North Senatorial District election
- 25 February 2023
| Nominee | Cyril Fasuyi | Funso Ayeni |
| Party | APC | PDP |
Senator before election
Olubunmi Ayodeji Adetunmbi
APC
Elected Senator
To be determined
To be determined

The Ekiti North Senatorial District covers the local government areas of Ido-Osi, Ikole, Ilejemeje, Moba, and Oye. Incumbent Olubunmi Ayodeji Adetunmbi (APC), who was elected with 54.7% of the vote in 2019, sought re-election but failed to be renomination by his party.

=== Primary elections ===
==== All Progressives Congress ====
On 20 April 2022, the APC National Executive Committee announced the party's schedule for senatorial primaries, setting its expression of interest form price at ₦3 million and nomination form price at ₦17 million with a 50% discount for candidates younger than 40 while women and candidates with disabilities get free nomination forms. Forms were to be sold from 26 April to 6 May until the deadline was later extended to 10 May then 12 May. After the submission of nomination forms by 13 May, candidates were screened by a party committee on 14 and 15 May while 18 May was the date for the screening appeal process. Ward congresses and LGA congresses were set for 16 and 17 May to elect delegates for the primary. Candidates approved by the screening process advanced to a primary set for 27 May, in concurrence with other APC senatorial primaries; challenges to the result could be made on 28 May.

On the primary date, controversy arose over a state party directive that barred journalists from covering the primary. The primary, held in Ifaki-Ekiti in Ido-Osi LGA, was called into question by reporters due to the gag order but carried on and resulted in Adetunmbi losing to Cyril Fasuyi—a businessman who was the Director-General of the Biodun Oyebanji gubernatorial campaign organization at the time of the primary.

APC primary results
| Party | Candidate | Votes | % |
|---|---|---|---|
| APC | Cyril Fasuyi | 111 | 43.36% |
| APC | Olubunmi Ayodeji Adetunmbi | 85 | 33.20% |
| APC | Oluomo Osinkolu | 47 | 18.36% |
| APC | Segun Ajibulu | 13 | 5.08% |
| Total votes | | 256 | 100.00% |
| Invalid or blank votes | | 14 | N/A |
| Turnout | | 270 | 96.43% |

==== People's Democratic Party ====
On 16 March 2022, the national PDP announced its senatorial primary timetable, setting its expression of interest form price at ₦1 million and the nomination form price at ₦20 million with a 50% discount for candidates between 25 and 30. Forms were to be sold until 1 April but the party later extended the deadline four times before reaching a final deadline of 22 April. After the submission of nomination forms by 25 April, candidates were screened by a party committee on 27 April while 2 May was the rescheduled date for the screening appeal process. Ward congresses were set for 29 April and LGA congresses were rescheduled for 10 May to elect delegates for the primary. Candidates approved by the screening process advanced to a primary set for 23 May, in concurrence with other PDP senatorial primaries but due to often violently enforced Monday stay-at-home orders by separatists, southeastern state parties held their primaries on 24 May; challenges to the result could be made on 25 May.

On the primary date, Funso Ayeni was nominated over former MHR Kehinde Agboola.

=== General election ===
==== Results ====
2023 Ekiti North Senatorial District election
| Party | Candidate | Votes | % |
|---|---|---|---|
| ADC | Kehinde Bamidele Orimolade | | |
| APC | Cyril Fasuyi | | |
| New Nigeria Peoples Party | Edward Adelusi Ayeni | | |
| PRP | John Olusegun Adeleye | | |
| PDP | Funso Ayeni | | |
| SDP | Akinloye Oladele Aiyegbusi | | |
| YPP | Kehinde Adebanke Daramola | | |
| ZLP | Kolade Ayodele Ipinlaye | | |
| Total votes | | | 100.00% |
| Invalid or blank votes | | | N/A |
| Turnout | | | |

== Ekiti South ==
2023 Ekiti South Senatorial District election
- 25 February 2023
| Nominee | Raphael Adeyemi Adaramodu | Abiodun Olujimi |
| Party | APC | PDP |
Senator before election
Abiodun Olujimi
PDP
Elected Senator
To be determined
To be determined

The Ekiti South Senatorial District covers the local government areas of Ekiti East, Ekiti South-West, Emure, Gbonyin, Ikere-Ekiti, and Ise/Orun. In the 2019 election, Adebayo Clement Adeyeye (APC) initially won and was sworn in as senator in June; however, his election was overturned in September and the victory awarded to Abiodun Olujimi (PDP). Olujimi is seeking re-election.

=== Primary elections ===
==== All Progressives Congress ====
On 20 April 2022, the APC National Executive Committee announced the party's schedule for senatorial primaries, setting its expression of interest form price at ₦3 million and nomination form price at ₦17 million with a 50% discount for candidates younger than 40 while women and candidates with disabilities get free nomination forms. Forms were to be sold from 26 April to 6 May until the deadline was later extended to 10 May then 12 May. After the submission of nomination forms by 13 May, candidates were screened by a party committee on 14 and 15 May while 18 May was the date for the screening appeal process. Ward congresses and LGA congresses were set for 16 and 17 May to elect delegates for the primary. Candidates approved by the screening process advanced to a primary set for 27 May, in concurrence with other APC senatorial primaries; challenges to the result could be made on 28 May.

The primary in Ikere-Ekiti resulted in Raphael Adeyemi Adaramodu—member of the House of Representatives for Ekiti South West/Ikere/Ise/Orun—being nominated unopposed; prior to the primary, reports stated that Adaramodu could be backed by Governor Kayode Fayemi.

==== People's Democratic Party ====
On 16 March 2022, the national PDP announced its senatorial primary timetable, setting its expression of interest form price at ₦1 million and the nomination form price at ₦20 million with a 50% discount for candidates between 25 and 30. Forms were to be sold until 1 April but the party later extended the deadline four times before reaching a final deadline of 22 April. After the submission of nomination forms by 25 April, candidates were screened by a party committee on 27 April while 2 May was the rescheduled date for the screening appeal process. Ward congresses were set for 29 April and LGA congresses were rescheduled for 10 May to elect delegates for the primary. Candidates approved by the screening process advanced to a primary set for 23 May, in concurrence with other PDP senatorial primaries but due to often violently enforced Monday stay-at-home orders by separatists, southeastern state parties held their primaries on 24 May; challenges to the result could be made on 25 May.

Before the primaries, the rift between Olujimi and former Governor Ayo Fayose (who was in effective control of the Ekiti PDP) was noted as a potential threat to Olujimi's renomination bid as several known Fayose allies had announced their candidacies. Although the Fayose-backed initially looked to be manifesting as he publicly endorsed his longtime ally—former Deputy Governor Kolapo Olushola in April 2022, the plan fell apart by the next month when Olushola accused Fayose of deceitful manipulation and withdrew from the primary. In the primary at the Bamidele Olumilua University of Education, Science and Technology in Ikere-Ekiti, the other challenger to Olujimi—another Fayose ally, former member of the House of Representatives for Ekiti South West/Ikere/Ise/Orun Segun Adekola—also withdrew so the exercise renominated Olujimi unopposed. Later reporting suggested that the withdrawal was a part of reconciliation moves between Fayose and Olujimi.

=== Campaign ===
Infighting within the state PDP greatly impacted the election campaign, especially in January 2023 when former Governor Ayo Fayose (PDP) reportedly directed his supporters to vote for Adaramodu instead of his intraparty rival Olujimi. In response, Olujimi condemned Fayose as self-centered and disrespectful. As campaign season continued into February, Fayose made his endorsement of Adaramodu public and implored local PDP members to back the APC in the senatorial race. However, pundits noted the purported support Olujimi gave to APC gubernatorial nominee Biodun Oyebanji in the 2022 Ekiti State gubernatorial election, surmising that the state APC may not fully support Adaramodu against her. Geographic factors were also noted as while Adaramodu represents the local government areas of Ekiti South-West, Ikere-Ekiti, and Ise/Orun in the House, Olujimi had a formidable base in the rest of the district along with vote-rich Ikere-Ekiti).

=== General election ===
==== Results ====
2023 Ekiti South Senatorial District election
| Party | Candidate | Votes | % |
|---|---|---|---|
| ADC | Ayokunle Olusegun Ayodele | | |
| APC | Raphael Adeyemi Adaramodu | | |
| New Nigeria Peoples Party | Ayodele Samuel Olafin | | |
| PDP | Abiodun Olujimi | | |
| SDP | Fasakin Isaac Abiodun | | |
| ZLP | Kehinde Tope Abayomi | | |
| Total votes | | | 100.00% |
| Invalid or blank votes | | | N/A |
| Turnout | | | |

== See also ==
- 2023 Nigerian Senate election
- 2023 Nigerian elections
