= 2023 Nigerian presidential election in Ekiti State =

- 25 February 2023
- Registered: 987,647
- Turnout: 31.84%
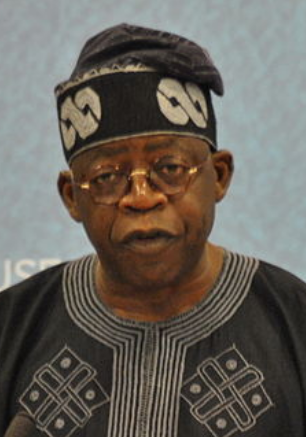

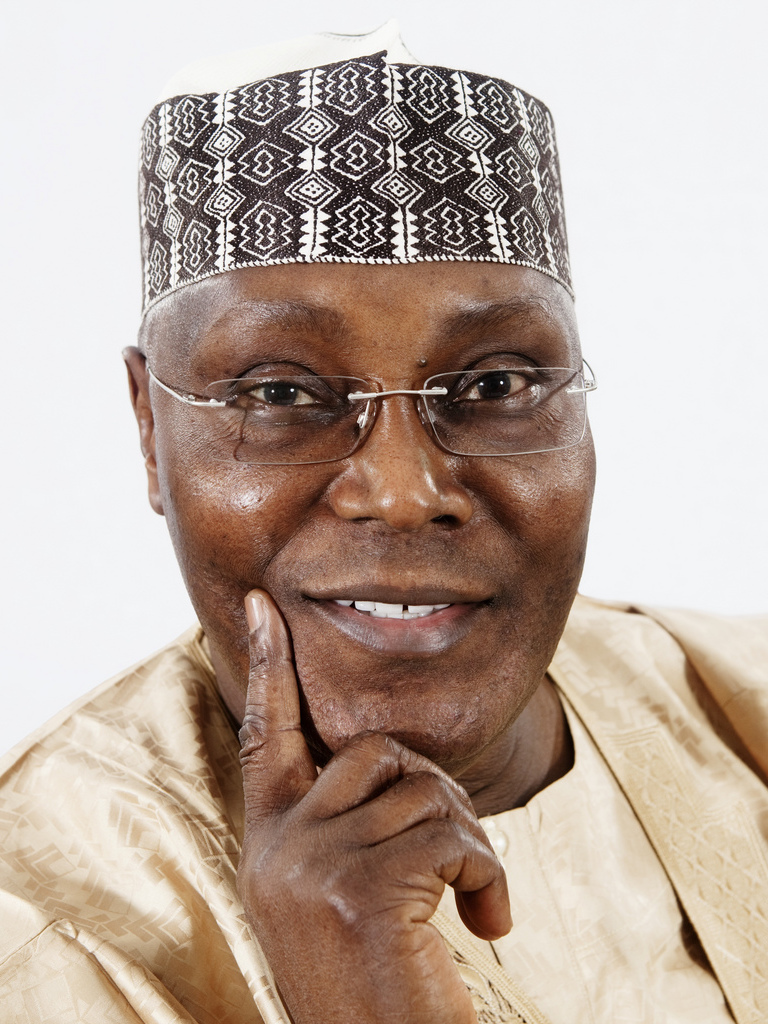

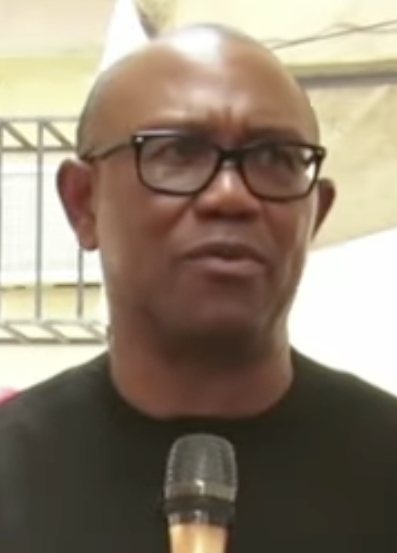
Nominee	Bola Tinubu	Atiku Abubakar	Peter Obi
Party	APC	PDP	LP
Home state	Lagos	Adamawa	Anambra
Running mate	Kashim Shettima	Ifeanyi Okowa	Yusuf Datti Baba-Ahmed
Popular vote	201,486	89,554	11,397
Percentage	65.38%	29.06%	3.70%
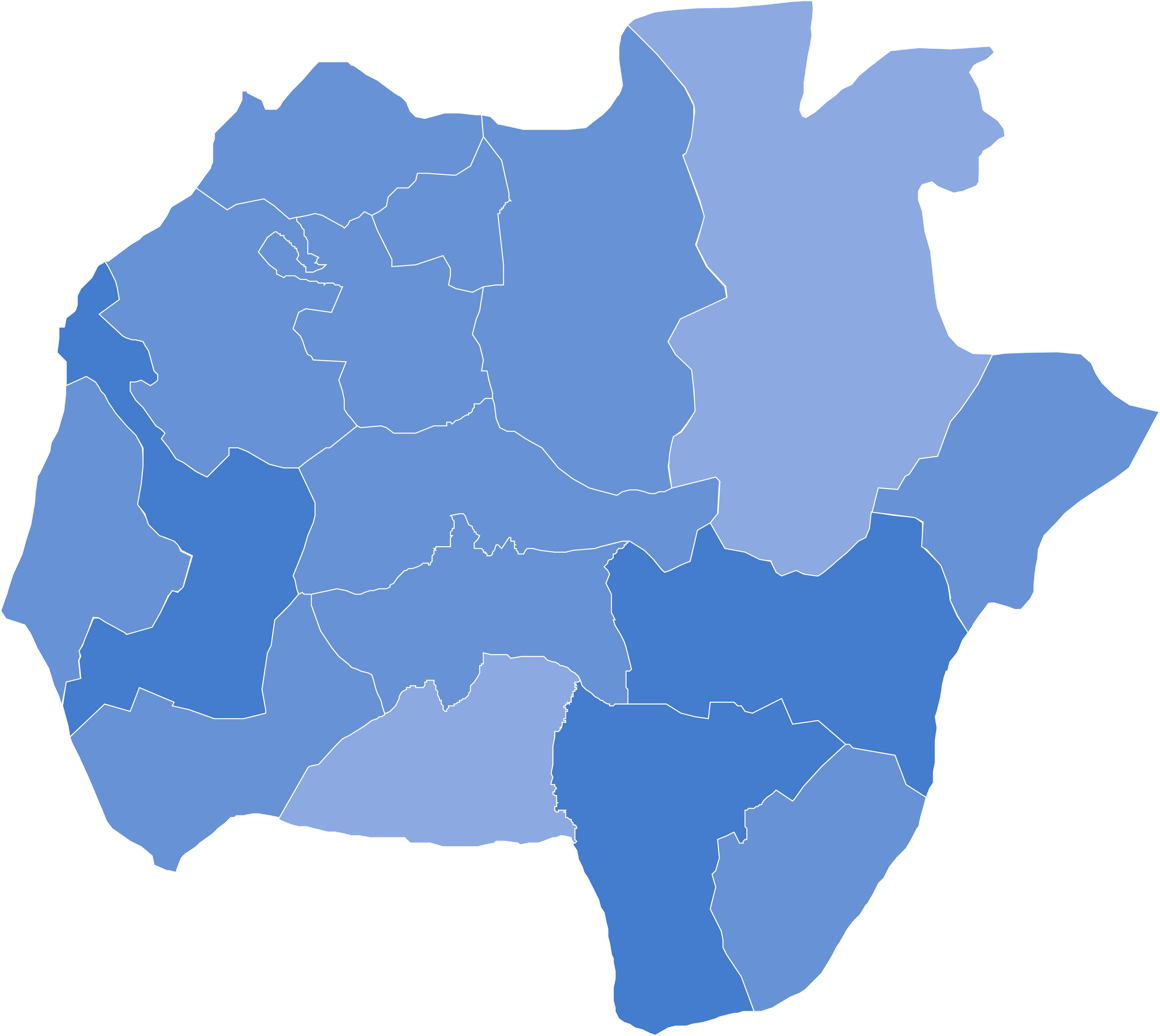
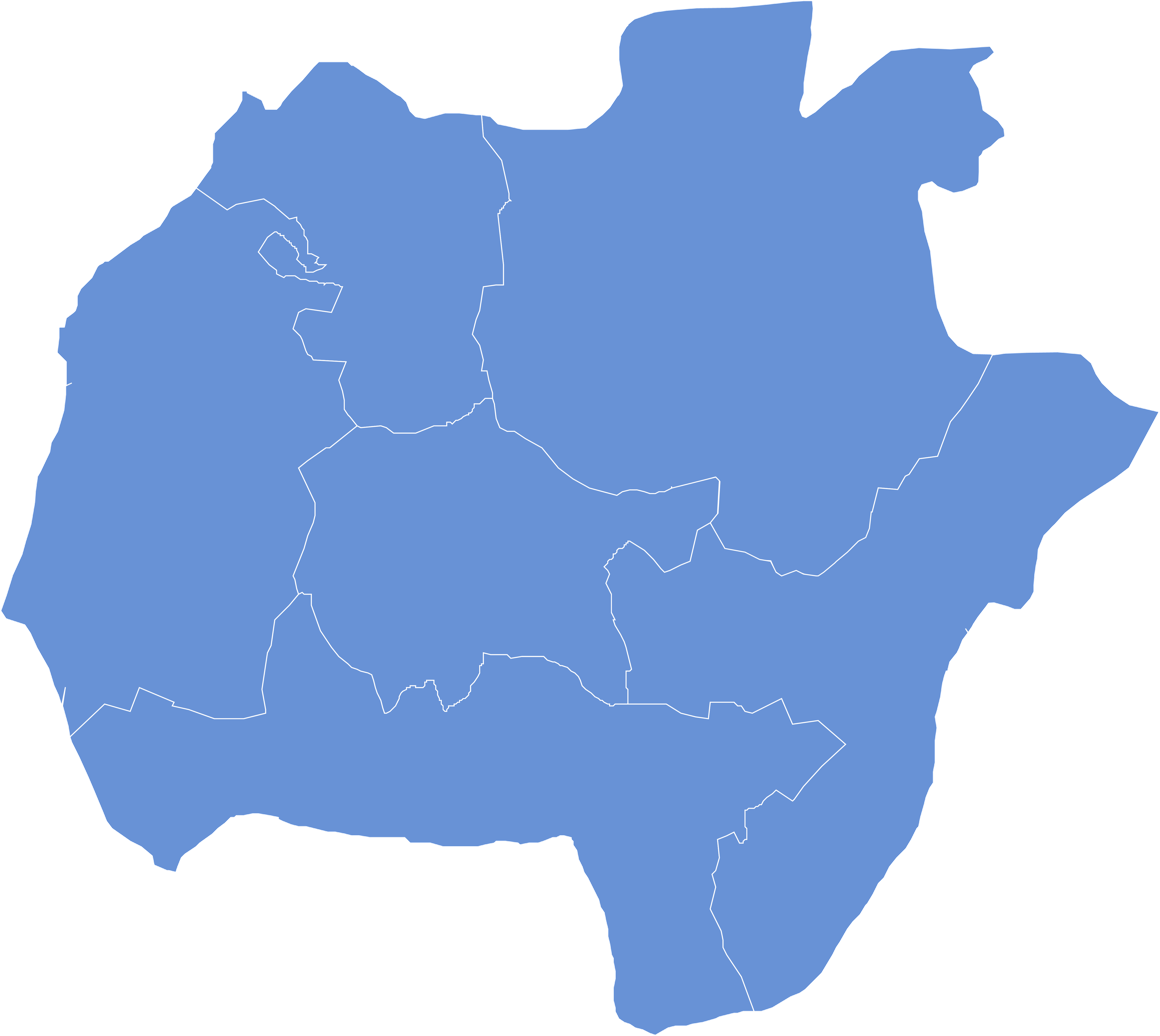
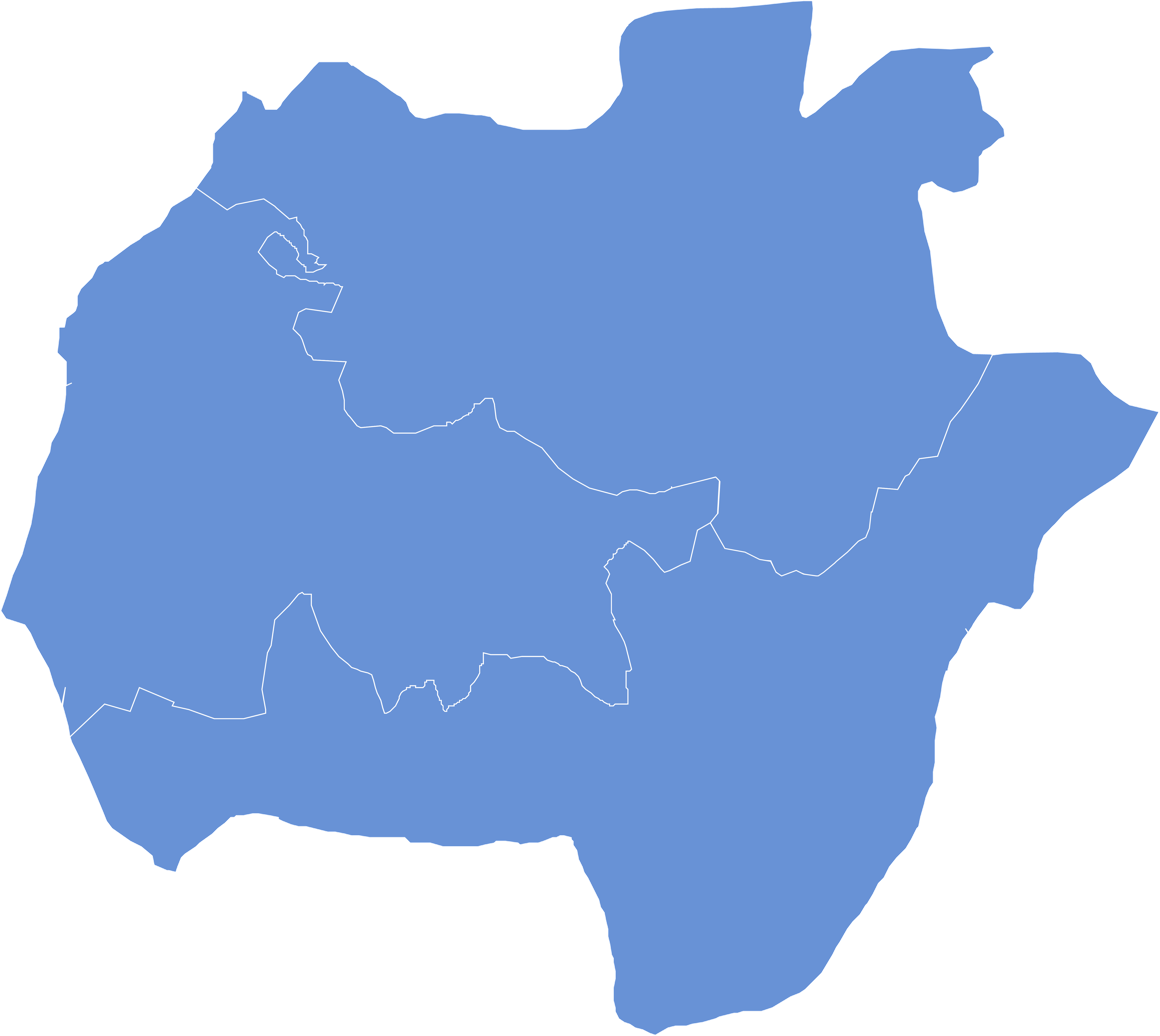
- Results; Tinubu: 50–60% 60–70% 70–80%
President before election
Muhammadu Buhari
APC
Elected President
TBD

The 2023 Nigerian presidential election in Ekiti State was held on 25 February 2023 as part of the nationwide 2023 Nigerian presidential election to elect the president and vice president of Nigeria. Other federal elections, including elections to the House of Representatives and the Senate, were also held on the same date while state elections were held two weeks afterward on 11 March.

Bola Tinubu—the nominee of the All Progressives Congress—ultimately won the state by over 110,000 votes, a 36% margin, over runner-up Atiku Abubakar of the Peoples Democratic Party. The other two major contenders, Peter Obi (Labour Party) and Rabiu Kwankwaso (New Nigeria Peoples Party), trailed with just 3.7% and 0.09%, respectively.

== Background ==
Ekiti State is a small, Yoruba-majority southwestern state with vast natural areas but facing an underdeveloped yet vital agricultural sector, high unemployment, and rising debt. The state also has to contend with insecurity with abated, but still present, conflict between herders and farmers in the state's rural areas.

The state's 2019 elections categorized by a massive swing to the APC as its presidential nominee Muhammadu Buhari won the state back after the PDP had won it in 2015. Legislatively the APC also gained ground, winning all two Senate seats, all six House of Representatives seats, and control of the House of Assembly. Two years later, Abiodun Oyebanji retained the gubernatorial office for the APC, winning with 53% of the vote.

== Polling ==
Polling organisation/client	Fieldwork date	Sample size					Others	Undecided	Undisclosed	Not voting
Polling organisation/client	Fieldwork date	Sample size	Tinubu APC	Obi LP	Kwankwaso NNPP	Abubakar PDP	Others	Undecided	Undisclosed	Not voting
BantuPage	January 2023	N/A	31%	14%	0%	5%	–	36%	8%	6%
Nextier (Ekiti crosstabs of national poll)	27 January 2023	N/A	22.4%	36.2%	6.9%	34.5%	–	–	–	–
SBM Intelligence for EiE (Ekiti crosstabs of national poll)	22 January-6 February 2023	N/A	56%	9%	3%	15%	1%	15%	–	–

== Projections ==
Source	Projection		As of
Africa Elects (Note: AfricaElects projections predict the likelihood of a candidate winning a state by categorizing a state as "Safe" for exceedingly likely, "Likely" for somewhat likely, and "Lean" for least likely. If no clear determination could be made, states are categorized as "tossups".)	Safe Tinubu		24 February 2023
Dataphyte (Note: Dataphyte projections predict candidates' projected votal shares in each state.)
Dataphyte	Tinubu:	38.33%	11 February 2023
Dataphyte	Obi:	33.52%	11 February 2023
Dataphyte	Abubakar:	15.47%	11 February 2023
Dataphyte	Others:	12.62%	11 February 2023
Enough is Enough- SBM Intelligence (Note: EiE-SBM projections predict which candidates will win states.)	Tinubu		17 February 2023
SBM Intelligence (Note: SBM projections predict which candidates will win states or, if no determination could be made, categorizes states as "Too close to call" (TCC).)	Tinubu		15 December 2022
ThisDay (Note: ThisDay projections predict candidates' projected votal shares in each state.)
ThisDay	Tinubu:	45%	27 December 2022
ThisDay	Obi:	10%	27 December 2022
ThisDay	Kwankwaso:	–	27 December 2022
ThisDay	Abubakar:	20%	27 December 2022
ThisDay	Others/Undecided:	20%	27 December 2022
The Nation (Note: The Nation projections predict which candidates will win states or, if no determination could be made, categorizes states as "Battlegrounds.")	Tinubu		12-19 February 2023

== General election ==
=== Results ===
Candidates' vote share
1. Bola Tinubu (APC) (65.4%)
2. Atiku Abubakar (PDP) (29.1%)
3. Peter Obi (LP) (3.70%)
4. Rabiu Kwankwaso (NNPP) (0.09%)
5. Other candidates (1.77%)

2023 Nigerian presidential election in Ekiti State
Party	Candidate	Votes	%
APC	Bola Tinubu	201,486	65.38%
PDP	Atiku Abubakar	89,554	29.06%
LP	Peter Obi	11,397	3.70%
SDP	Adewole Adebayo	2,011	0.65%
ADC	Dumebi Kachikwu	1,337	0.43%
ADP	Yabagi Sani	737	0.24%
ZLP	Dan Nwanyanwu	460	0.15%
APGA	Peter Umeadi	268	0.09%
New Nigeria Peoples Party	Rabiu Kwankwaso	264	0.09%
NRM	Felix Johnson Osakwe	131	0.04%
AAC	Omoyele Sowore	108	0.04%
APP	Osita Nnadi	91	0.03%
YPP	Malik Ado-Ibrahim	81	0.03%
A	Christopher Imumolen	69	0.02%
PRP	Kola Abiola	48	0.02%
APM	Princess Chichi Ojei	46	0.01%
BP	Sunday Adenuga	46	0.01%
AA	Hamza al-Mustapha	29	0.01%
Total votes		308,171	100.00%
Invalid or blank votes		6,301	N/A
Turnout		314,472	31.84%

==== By senatorial district ====
The results of the election by senatorial district.

Senatorial district	Bola Tinubu APC		Atiku Abubakar PDP		Peter Obi LP		Rabiu Kwankwaso NNPP		Others		Total valid votes
Senatorial district	Votes	%	Votes	%	Votes	%	Votes	%	Votes	%	Total valid votes
Ekiti Central Senatorial District (Note: Comprising the local government areas of Ado Ekiti, Efon, Ekiti West, Ijero Ekiti, and Irepodun/Ifelodun.)	76,033	68.36%	26,254	23.61%	5,918	5.32%	128	0.12%	2,886	2.59%	111,219
Ekiti North Senatorial District (Note: Comprising the local government areas of Ido-Osi, Ikole, Ilejemeje, Moba, and Oye.)	58,499	61.07%	33,326	34.79%	2,547	2.66%	59	0.06%	1,355	1.41%	95,786
Ekiti South Senatorial District (Note: Comprising the local government areas of Ekiti East, Ekiti South-West, Emure, Gbonyin, Ikere-Ekiti, and Ise/Orun.)	58,795	65.83%	26,939	30.16%	2,467	2.76%	61	0.07%	1,046	1.17%	89,308
Totals	201,486	65.38%	89,554	29.06%	11,397	3.70%	264	0.09%	5470	1.77%	308,171

==== By federal constituency ====
The results of the election by federal constituency.

Federal constituency	Bola Tinubu APC		Atiku Abubakar PDP		Peter Obi LP		Rabiu Kwankwaso NNPP		Others		Total valid votes
Federal constituency	Votes	%	Votes	%	Votes	%	Votes	%	Votes	%	Total valid votes
Ado Ekiti/Irepodun-Ifelodun Federal Constituency (Note: Comprising the local government areas of Ado Ekiti and Irepodun/Ifelodun.)	43,016	67.75%	13,684	21.55%	5,029	7.92%	111	0.17%	1,650	2.60%	63,490
Ekiti South West/Ikere/Ise/Orun Federal Constituency (Note: Comprising the local government areas of Ekiti South-West, Ikere-Ekiti, and Ise/Orun.)	34,408	66.24%	14,979	28.84%	1,847	3.56%	43	0.08%	668	1.29%	51,945
Emure/Gbonyin/Ekiti East Federal Constituency (Note: Comprising the local government areas of Ekiti East, Emure, and Gbonyin.)	32,546	66.12%	14,995	30.46%	1,085	2.20%	32	0.07%	8,877	1.14%	49,221
Ido/Osi, Moba/Ilejemeje Federal Constituency (Note: Comprising the local government areas of Ido-Osi, Ilejemeje, and Moba.)	28,562	61.98%	15,985	34.69%	1,125	2.44%	28	0.06%	382	0.83%	46,082
Ijero/Ekiti West/Efon Federal Constituency (Note: Comprising the local government areas of Efon, Ekiti West, and Ijero Ekiti.)	33,017	69.18%	12,570	26.34%	889	1.86%	17	0.04%	1,236	2.59%	47,729
Ikole/Oye Federal Constituency (Note: Comprising the local government areas of Ikole and Oye.)	29,937	60.23%	17,341	34.89%	1,422	2.86%	31	0.06%	973	1.96%	49,704
Totals	201,486	65.38%	89,554	29.06%	11,397	3.70%	264	0.09%	5470	1.77%	308,171

==== By local government area ====
The results of the election by local government area.

Local government area	Bola Tinubu APC		Atiku Abubakar PDP		Peter Obi LP		Rabiu Kwankwaso NNPP		Others		Total valid votes	Turnout (%)
Local government area	Votes	%	Votes	%	Votes	%	Votes	%	Votes	%	Total valid votes	Turnout (%)
Ado Ekiti (Note: Ado Ekiti: Results were voided in one polling unit due to "BVAS bypass.")	28,751	67.22%	8,168	19.1%	4,485	10.49%	87	0.20%	1,282	3.00%	42,773	24.49%
Efon	5,873	67.84%	2,521	29.12%	125	1.44%	3	0.04%	135	1.56%	8,657	30.00%
Ekiti East (Note: Ekiti East: Results were voided in two polling units due to overvoting.)	12,426	59.82%	7,782	37.46%	375	1.81%	7	0.03%	182	0.88%	20,772	34.37%
Ekiti South-West	11,334	66.50%	5,047	29.61%	440	2.58%	9	0.05%	215	1.26%	17,045	32.50%
Ekiti West	14,516	73.47%	4,318	21.85%	391	1.98%	8	0.04%	525	2.66%	19,758	34.13%
Emure	8,159	68.81%	3,035	25.59%	465	3.92%	14	0.12%	185	1.56%	11,858	32.44%
Gbonyin	11,961	72.09%	4,178	25.18%	245	1.48%	11	0.07%	196	1.18%	16,591	31.41%
Ido-Osi	11,917	58.32%	7,476	36.58%	782	3.83%	14	0.07%	246	1.20%	20,435	36.11%
Ijero Ekiti	12,628	65.38%	5,731	29.68%	373	1.93%	6	0.03%	576	2.98%	19,314	31.19%
Ikere-Ekiti	11,659	58.17%	7,198	35.91%	910	4.54%	24	0.12%	253	1.26%	20,044	31.28%
Ikole	15,465	57.36%	10,198	37.82%	779	2.89%	11	0.04%	509	1.89%	26,962	38.27%
Ilejemeje	4,599	62.05%	2,662	35.91%	97	1.31%	3	0.04%	51	0.69%	7,412	40.03%
Irepodun/Ifelodun	14,265	68.86%	5,516	26.63%	544	2.63%	24	0.12%	368	1.78%	20,717	30.10%
Ise/Orun	11,415	76.84%	2,734	18.40%	497	3.34%	10	0.07%	200	1.35%	14,856	32.47%
Moba	12,046	66.06%	5,847	32.06%	246	1.35%	11	0.06%	85	0.47%	18,235	34.53%
Oye	14,472	63.64%	7,143	31.41%	643	2.83%	20	0.09%	464	2.04%	22,742	35.49%
Totals	201,486	65.38%	89,554	29.06%	11,397	3.70%	264	0.09%	5470	1.77%	308,171	31.84%

== See also ==
- 2023 Nigerian elections
- 2023 Nigerian presidential election
