= 2018 Ekiti State gubernatorial election =

2018 gubernatorial election in Ekiti State, Nigeria

- 14 July 2018
Nominee	Kayode Fayemi	Kolapo Olushola
Party	APC	PDP
Running mate	Bisi Egbeyemi	Deji Ogunsakin
Popular vote	197,462	177,927
Governor before election
Ayo Fayose
PDP
Elected Governor
Kayode Fayemi
APC

The 2018 Ekiti State gubernatorial election occurred in Nigeria on 14 July 2018. APC Governor Kayode Fayemi who ruled from 2010 to 2014 won re-election for a second term, defeating Kolapo Olushola of the PDP.

Kayode Fayemi emerged APC gubernatorial candidate after scoring 941 votes and defeating his closest rival, Segun Oni, who received 481 votes. He picked Bisi Egbeyemi as his running mate. Kolapo Olushola was the PDP candidate with Deji Ogunsakin as his running mate. 35 candidates contested in the election.

== Electoral system ==
The Governor of Ekiti State is elected using the plurality voting system.

== Primary election ==
=== APC primary ===
The APC primary election was held on 12 May 2018. Kayode Fayemi won the primary election polling 941 votes against 33 other candidates. His closest rival was Segun Oni, a former governor of the state, who came second with 481 votes, Kayode Ojo came third with 281 votes.

=== PDP primary ===
The PDP primary election was held on 8 May 2018. Kolapo Olushola emerged as a consensus candidate, with Adebayo Clement Adeyeye as his running mate.

== Results ==
A total number of 35 candidates registered with the Independent National Electoral Commission to contest in the election.

The total number of registered voters in the state was 909,585, while 405,861 voters were accredited. Total number of votes cast was 403,451, while number of valid votes was 384,594. Rejected votes were 18,857.

Candidate	Party	Votes	%
Kayode Fayemi	All Progressives Congress	197,462	51.34
Kolapo Olushola	People's Democratic Party	177,927	46.26
Other candidates		9,205	2.39
Total		384,594	100.00
Valid votes		384,594	95.33
Invalid/blank votes		18,857	4.67
Total votes		403,451	100.00
Registered voters/turnout		909,585	44.36
Source: ThisDay

=== By local government area ===
Here are the results of the election by local government area for the two major parties. The total valid votes of 384,594 represents the 35 political parties that participated in the election. Blue represents LGAs won by Kayode Fayemi. Green represents LGAs won by Kolapo Olushola.

LGA	Kayode Fayemi APC		Kolapo Olushola PDP		Total votes
LGA	#	%	#	%	#
Ilejemeje	4,156		3,937		
Irepodun/Ifelodun	13,869		11,456		
Ido-Osi	12,342		11,145		
Oye	14,995		11,071		
Efon	5,028		5,192		
Moba	11,837		8,520		
Ijero	14,192		11,077		
Gbonyin	11,498		8,027		
Emure	7,048		7,121		
Ikere	17,183		11,515		
Ekiti West	12,648		10,137		
Ikole	14,522		13,961		
Ise/Orun	11,908		6,297		
Ekiti East	12,778		11,564		
Ekiti South-West	11,015		8,423		
Ado	32,810		28,111		
Totals	197,462		177,927		384,594
