= Ogunlola Olubunmi =

Nigerian politician

- Succeeded by: Biodun Omoleye

Former Member of the House of Representatives of Nigeria
- Constituency: Ijero/Ekiti West/Efon Federal Constituency

Personal details
- Born: 19 July 1965 (age 60)
- Party: APC
- Profession: Politician

Ogunlola Omowumi Olubunmi is a Nigerian politician from Ekiti State, Nigeria. She was born on 19 July 1965. She represented Ijero/Ekiti West/Efon Federal Constituency in the House of Representatives.
