= 2026 Ekiti State gubernatorial election =

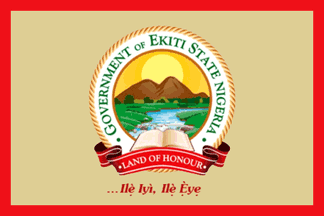
- 20 June 2026
Party	APC	PDP	ADC
Popular vote	319,224	40,543	12,872
Governor before election
Biodun Oyebanji
APC
Elected Governor
Biodun Oyebanji
APC

The 2026 Ekiti State gubernatorial election took place on 20 June 2026, to elect the Governor of Ekiti State. The Incumbent APC Governor, Biodun Oyebanji, is in his first term and will be running against other candidates to seek re-election for a second term. The election primaries took place last year between 20 October and 10 November 2025.

For the 2026 Ekiti Governorship election, the Independent National Electoral Commission, INEC, declared Biodun Oyebanji winner after he polled 319,224 votes in Saturday's election held on June 20, 2026 in the state.

== Electoral system ==
The Governor of Ekiti State is elected using a modified two-round system. To be elected in the first round, a candidate must receive the plurality of the vote and over 25% of the vote in at least two-thirds of state local government areas. If no candidate passes this threshold, a second round will be held between the top candidate and the next candidate to have received a plurality of votes in the highest number of local government areas.

== Primary elections ==
The election primaries took place between 20 October and 10 November 2025. According to some candidates and community leaders under the group, Ekiti South Agenda Forum, an informal zoning gentlemen's agreement entitles the Ekiti South Senatorial District to produce the next governor, since all Ekiti Governors have come from either Ekiti central or Ekiti North Senatorial District since the return of Democracy in 1999. However, no major party has yet closed the primaries to non-southerners.

=== APC ===
In October 2025, the APC affirmed Oyebanji as its candidate through a consensus arrangement, with 885 delegates from the state's 177 wards affirming his candidacy unopposed at the Ekiti Parapo Pavilion in Ado-Ekiti.

==== Declared ====
- Richard Bamisile, Emure/Gbonyin/Ekiti East Representative and 2022 APC gubernatorial candidate
- Biodun Oyebanji, Incumbent Governor

==== Potential ====
- Babafemi Ojudu, former Ekiti Central Senator and Special Adviser to President Muhammadu Buhari on Political Matters
- Olawale Fapohunda, Ekiti Attorney-General and Commissioner of Justice
- Biodun Omoleye, Chief of Staff to Governor Fayemi
- Abiodun Oyebanji, Secretary to the State Government
- Makinde Araoye, Special Adviser on Federal and Intergovernmental Matters to Governor Fayemi
- Bamidele Faparusi, Commissioner for Infrastructure and Public Utilities and 2018 APC gubernatorial candidate
- Muyiwa Olumilua, Commissioner for Investments, Trade and Industries
- Diran Adesua, Commissioner for Housing and Urban Development
- Adeyemi Adaramodu, Ekiti South West/Ikere/Ise/Orun Representative
- Mojisola Yaya-Kolade, Commissioner for Health
- Bolaji Aluko, former Federal University, Otuoke Vice-Chancellor, Coordinator of the Ekiti State COVID-19 Task Force, and Director-General of the Office of Transformation and Service Delivery
- Funminiyi Afuye, Speaker of the Ekiti State House of Assembly
- Adebayo Clement Adeyeye, former Ekiti South Senator, 2018 PDP gubernatorial candidate, and former Minister of State for Works
- Paul Omotoso, Ekiti APC Caretaker Chairman
- Kayode Ojo, businessman and 2018 APC gubernatorial candidate
- Otunba Ademola Popoola, aviation consultant

=== PDP ===
==== Purchased nomination forms ====
The PDP nominated Wole Oluyede, a physician, as its candidate on 9 November 2025, after he won the party primary with 279 votes against closest rival Funso Ayeni's 239. His running mate was Deji Ogunsakin. INEC's initial candidate list excluded Oluyede following a Federal High Court ruling in Ado-Ekiti that nullified the PDP primary; a subsequent Federal High Court ruling in Abuja ordered INEC to recognize his candidacy, a decision upheld on appeal in March 2026, after which INEC published his name and PDP's logo on the final ballot.

- Kayode Adaramodu, former Deputy Managing Director of the Guarantee Trust Bank
- Adewumi Adesoye
- Adekemi Adewumi, 2019 PDP House of Representatives candidate and widow of Chief of the Air Staff Ibrahim Mahmud Alfa

==== Declared ====
- Sikiru Tae-Lawal, former Deputy Governor

==== Potential ====
- Dare Bejide, former Ambassador to Canada, former Secretary to Ekiti State Government, 2018 PDP gubernatorial candidate, and 2018 PPN gubernatorial nominee
- Segun Adekola, Ekiti South West/Ikere/Ise/Orun Representative

== Controversies ==
- Social Democratic Party candidate Peter Obafemi alleged that the election was marred by intimidation and vote-buying. In an interview with Channels Television he said he witnessed an individual with bagloads of money at his polling unit and alleged that the person was associated with a major political party and protected by police officers. Obafemi also accused INEC and the police of being very compromised and called for stronger measures against vote-buying ahead of the 2027 general election.
