= Biodun Omoleye =

Nigerian politician

Federal Representative
- Preceded by: Ogunlola Olubunmi
- Constituency: Ijero/Ekiti West/Efon

Personal details
- Party: All Progressive Congress (APC)
- Occupation: Politician

Biodun Omoleye Francis is a Nigerian politician. He currently serves as a first-term Member of the House of Representatives in the 10th National Assembly. He represents Ijero/ Ekiti West/ Efon Constituency of Ekiti State on the platform of the All Progressive Congress (APC).
