= Ifelodun =

Ifelodun may refer to the following places in Nigeria :

- Ifelodun, Kwara State, a Local Government Area in Nigeria
- Ifelodun, Osun State, a Local Government Area in Nigeria
- Irepodun/Ifelodun, a Local Government Area of Ekiti State, Nigeria
