= Adeyeye =

Adéyẹyè is a name of Yoruba origin meaning "the crown or royalty befits chieftaincy". Many Yoruba people of royal lineage and nobility bear Adéyẹyè as their surname and forename. Notable people with the surname include:

- Olusola Adeyeye, Nigerian biologist and politician
- Prince Adedayo Clement Adeyeye, Nigerian politician
- Festus Adeyeye
- Modupe Adeyeye, English actress
- HIM, Oba, Dr. Adeyeye Enitan Ogunwusi, Ooni of Ife
