= Iyabo Fakunle-Okieimen =

Nigerian politician

Iyabo Fakunle-Okieimen is a Nigerian politician. She currently represent Ilejemeje Constituency in the Ekiti State House of Assembly.
