= Irepodun =

Irepodun may refer to:

- Irepodun, Kwara, a Local Government Area in Kwara, Nigeria
- Irepodun, Osun, a Local Government Area in Osun State, Nigeria
- Irepodun/Ifelodun, a Local Government Area of Ekiti State, Nigeria
