= Odebunmi Idowu Sunday =

Nigerian politician

Odebunmi Idowu is a Nigerian politician. He currently serves as the State Representatives representing Oye II constituency of Ekiti State at the State Legislature.
