= Olukismet FC =

Olukismet Football Club, commonly known as Olukismet FC, is a Nigerian football club based in Ikere-Ekiti, Ekiti State. The club competes in the Nigeria Nationwide League (NLO), the third tier of football in Nigeria. Olukismet FC is recognized for its role in grassroots football development in Ekiti State and for owning one of the first privately built football stadiums in the state.

The club is owned by Prince Olumide Adegboye Festus, a Nigerian entrepreneur and sports investor who founded the club as part of a broader initiative to promote youth development and sports infrastructure in Ekiti State.

== Stadium ==
Olukismet FC plays its home matches at the Olukismet Stadium. The stadium has a seating capacity of approximately 1,500 and is regarded as the first privately built football stadium in Ekiti State. It was inaugurated in 2023 by Nigeria's Minister of Solid Minerals Development, Dr. Dele Alake.
