= Efon-Alaaye =

Efon-Alaaye Efon
- City
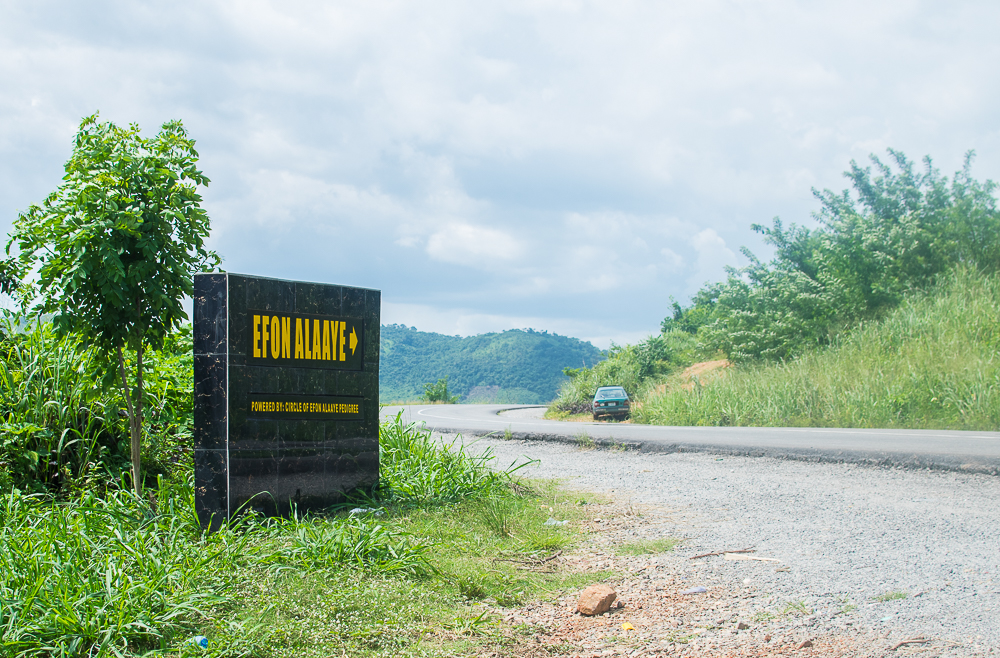

- Location in Nigeria
- Coordinates: 7°40′48″N 4°48′54″E
- Country: Nigeria
- State: Ekiti State
- LGA: Efon

Government
  - Type: Efon local government
  - Density: 232/km^{2} (600/sq mi)

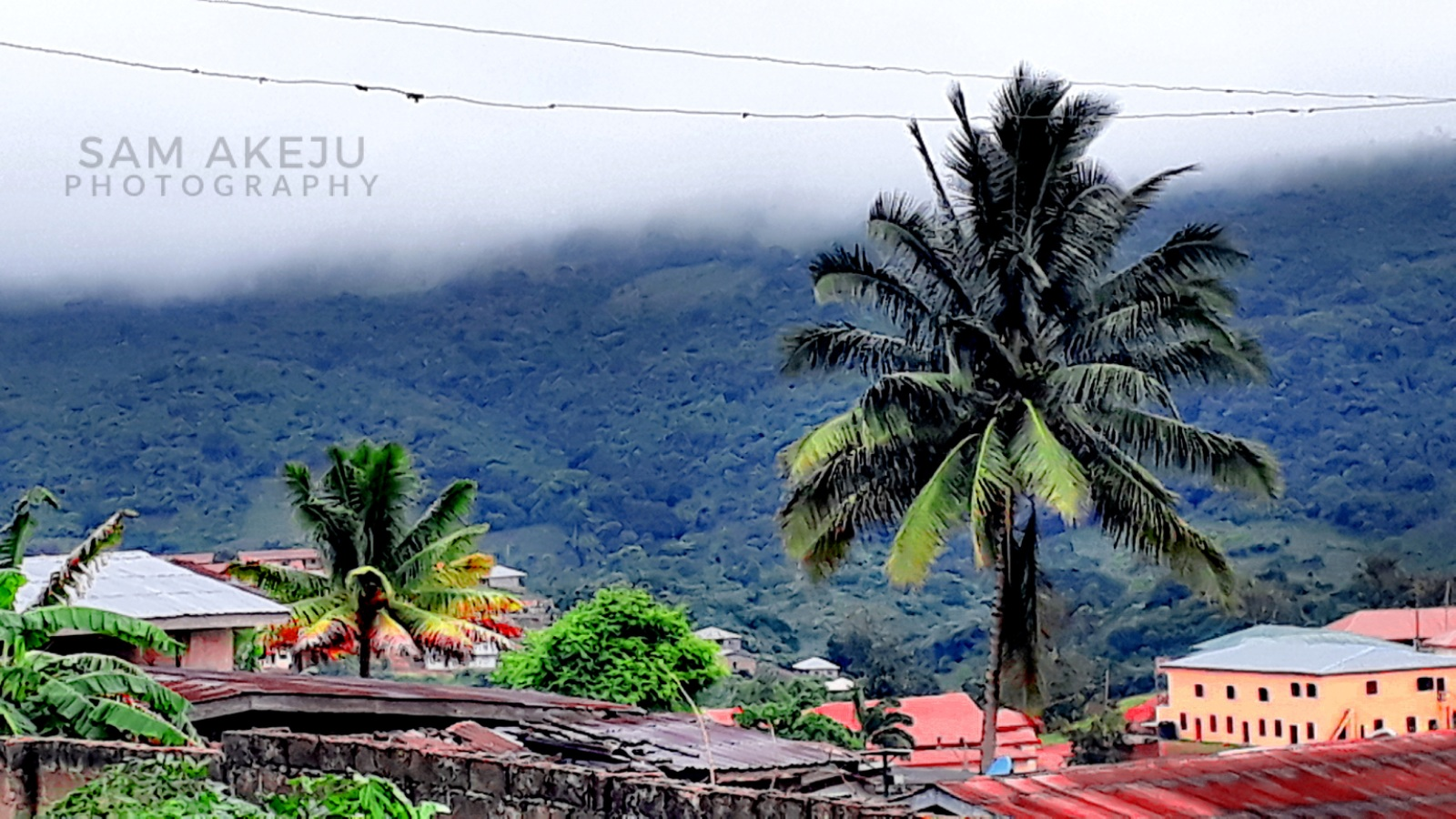
Mountain and palm tree

Ẹfọ̀n-Alààyè is a town in the Ekiti State of southwestern Nigeria, inhabited by the Yoruba people. The population in 1983 was over 100,000. It belongs to Efon Local Government, one of the largest local governments in Ekiti State.

== Demographics ==
Efon Alaaye people are predominantly farmers, they grow cash crops like kolanuts, cocoa, and palm trees; they are also known to be a major producers of yam, rice, cassava, maize, and many fruits.

The people of Efon Alaaye are subject to their king the Alaaye of Efon assisted by the six high chiefs of six major districts called "the iwara mefa"

People in Efon Alaaye are predominantly Christian, and by the 1930s, there had been a widespread acceptance of Jesus Christ, resulting in a revolution that left the town with several cathedrals. The major denominational groups are Catholics, Anglicans, and Christ Apostolic Church, and very recently the Pentecostals have gained ground, including the Seventh-day Adventist Church, which has been established to make its presence felt among these very religious people.

== History ==
Efon Alaaye dates back to 1200 A.D. In accordance with the historical facts, the founder and the first Alaaye (the title of Efon Alaaye Kings) of Efon Alaaye was Obalufon Alaayemore who was the third king or Ooni (title of Ile Ife kings) of Ile Ife, the cradle of Yoruba race. His father was the founder and father of the Yorubas and is known as Oduduwa or Odua. Obalufon Alaayemore installed his son Adudu Oranku to reign after him when he departed Efon Alaaye to go and ascend the throne in Ile Ife.

The founder of Efon Alaaye was about the only known king who reigned over two kingdoms with one of the kingdoms twice in his lifetime. He first ruled as the third Ooni of Ile- Ife having succeeded his father Obalufon Ogbogbodirin but vacated the throne on the advice of the Ile- Ife king makers for his uncle the Ife war hero, Oranmiyan who became the fourth Ooni of Ife. Obalufon Alayemore thereafter went and founded the kingdom of Efon Alaaye after vacating the Ile-Ife throne. He was called back to Ile- Ife by the king makers to become the fifth Ooni after the death of Oranmiyan. He thereafter left the throne of Efon Alaaye to his son whose lineage reigns in Efon Alaaye till today.

There are three ruling houses in Efon Alaaye that produces the Oba/King rotation. The ruling houses and the order of rotation are: - Ogbenuote, Obologun and Asemojo respectively. The reigning king on the throne is His Royal Highness Oba (Dr.) Emmanuel Aladejare Agunsoye II; he is the 46th Alaaye of Efon Alaaye. He holds a masters degree from University of Manchester, and a PhD from University of Sheffield and a former lecturer of the Obafemi Awolowo University. He comes from the Ogbenuote ruling house. And there are six high Chiefs who are heads of six Quarters that constituted the town. The six Heads are:-

- High Chief Obanla of Aaye Quarter
- High Chief Obaloja of Obalu Quarter
- High Chief Peteko of Isaja Quarter
- High Chief Oisajigan of Ejigan Quarter
- High Chief Alaayo of Emo Quarter
- High Chief Ojubu of Ikagbe Quarter

The town has a President General called the Aare of Efon Alaye who currently is Chief Dr Kunle Olajide from the Olajide Family of Asemojo Ruling House.

Topography

Efon Alaaye is a town full of hills, it has a relatively rough terrain.
