= Erinmope Ekiti =

Town in Ekiti State, Nigeria

Erinmope
- City
- Ekiti
- Interactive map of Erinmope
- Country: Nigeria
- State: Ekiti State
- Time zone: UTC+1 (WAT)

Erinmope Ekiti is an ancient town in Ekiti State, Nigeria. It is located in Moba Local Government Area. The genealogical history of Erinmope can be linked to Oraufe dynasty in Ile-Ife, through the birth of Ayetise, progenitor of Lajamisan and the emergence of Obaleo from the Lajamisan dynasty. The role of Ifa oracle in guiding the people from Ile-Ife to her current day location cannot be over emphasized. ERINMOPE came from the idea of history linked by the phrase - ERIN NI MO PE meaning “I taught it was an elephant”.
