= 2019 Nigerian Senate elections in Ekiti State =

The 2019 Nigerian Senate election in Ekiti State held on February 23, 2019, to elect members of the Nigerian Senate to represent Ekiti State. Michael Opeyemi Bamidele representing Ekiti Central, Adetumbi Olubunmi representing Ekiti North and Adebayo Clement Adeyeye representing Ekiti South all won on the platform of All Progressives Congress; however, Adeyeye's win was later overturned, and the seat awarded to PDP incumbent Abiodun Olujimi.

== Overview ==
Affiliation	Party		Total
Affiliation	APC	PDP	Total
Before Election	1	2	3
After Election	2	1	3

== Summary ==
District	Incumbent	Party	Elected Senator	Party
Ekiti Central	Fatimat Olufunke Raji-Rasaki	APC	Michael Opeyemi Bamidele	APC
Ekiti North	Duro Faseyi	PDP	Adetumbi Olubunmi	APC
Ekiti South	Abiodun Olujumi	PDP	Abiodun Olujimi	PDP

== Results ==
=== Ekiti Central ===
A total of 10 candidates registered with the Independent National Electoral Commission to contest in the election. APC candidate Michael Bamidele won the election, defeating PDP candidate Obafemi Adewale and 8 other party candidates. Michael Bamidele received 65.36% of the votes, while Obafemi Adewale received 33.76%.

2019 Nigerian Senate election in Ekiti State
Party	Candidate	Votes	%
APC	Michael Bamidele	94,279	65.36%
PDP	Obafemi Adewale	48,707	33.76%
Others		1,267	0.88%
Total votes		144,253	100%
APC hold			

=== Ekiti North ===
A total of 8 candidates registered with the Independent National Electoral Commission to contest in the election. APC candidate Adetumbi Olubunmi won the election, defeating PDP candidate Duro Faseyi and 6 other party candidates. Adetumbi Olubunmi received 54.67% of the votes, while Duro Faseyi received 44.33%.

2019 Nigerian Senate election in Ekiti State
Party	Candidate	Votes	%
APC	Adetumbi Olubunmi	60,689	54.67%
PDP	Duro Faseyi	49,209	44.33%
Others		1,294	1.17%
Total votes		111,012	100%
APC gain from PDP			

=== Ekiti South ===
A total of 9 candidates registered with the Independent National Electoral Commission to contest in the election. APC candidate Adebayo Clement Adeyeye won the election, defeating PDP candidate Abiodun Olujumi and 7 other party candidates. Adebayo Clement Adeyeye received 58.78% of the votes, while Abiodun Olujumi received 40.69%.

2019 Nigerian Senate election in Ekiti State
Party	Candidate	Votes	%
APC	Adebayo Clement Adeyeye	77,261	58.78%
PDP	Abiodun Olujimi	53,741	40.69%
Others		1,062	0.80%
Total votes		132,064	100%
PDP hold			

== Tribunal ==
The National Assembly Election Petition Tribunal sitting in Ado Ekiti nullified the election of Senator Dayo Adeyeye, and declared Senator Abiodun Olujimi winner of the Ekiti South, February 2019 senatorial elections.
