= Ilawe Ekiti =

Town in Ekiti state

- Town
- Location in Nigeria
- Coordinates: 7°36′0″N 5°6′0″E
- Country: Nigeria
- State: Ekiti State
- LGA: Ekiti South-West

Ilawe Ekiti (also Ilawe or Ilawe-Ekiti) is a town in Ekiti State, Nigeria. In 1995, the population was around 179,900. Its geographic coordinates are 7° 35' 60 N and 5° 5' 60 E.

== Locality ==
Ilawe Ekiti is divided into 8 different Quarters: Okebedo, Okeemo, Irorin, Aaye, Okepa, Okeloye, Iro, and Adin.

== Ruling Monarch ==
The current King of Ilawe is His Royal Majesty Oba Adebanji Ajibade Alabi (Afuntande 1). He ascended to the throne on 21 April 2012, taking over from Oba Joseph Ademileka.

== Emergence of Christianity in Ilawe ==
As far back as 1890, Missionaries has been founding their way into Yoruba Land which was the Western Part then. Back then, Ilawe people believed strongly in their traditional gods of the Yoruba religion. Sacrifices and obeisance were made to Ikereje, Ogun, Orunmila, Orinlase & other deities. The First contact with Christian Missionaries in Ilawe came through one Mr. Samuel Dada and Mr. Ajila both from the Okebedo Quarter in early 1903. Dada and Ajila, an Ilawean per excellence, came in contact with one Mr. Asefon who was then a Christian. Both Ilawe men was said to have been fascinated by Asefon's translation of some portions of the bible and they (Dada and Ajila) made a decision to learn how to write and how to read the bible. (Remember, there was no school in Ilawe as at this time.)

A Catechist of Church Missionary Society (CMS) at Ado Ekiti then (Rev. Sowumi) got wind of the interest of some people in Ilawe to know about Christianity, he then immediately sent another missionary to go and teach Auru & Ajila the scripture. Soon, there were more adherents, some of the pioneer adherents of the Church Missionary Society (Now known as Anglican Communion) were from various quarters of the town. From Oke Emo were Ajakaye, Oguntoye and John Afolalu; from Adin were Emmanuel Adegbolata; Afelumo came from Aaye and Apata came from Iro. Samuel Dada and Kolapo came from Okebedo Quarter.

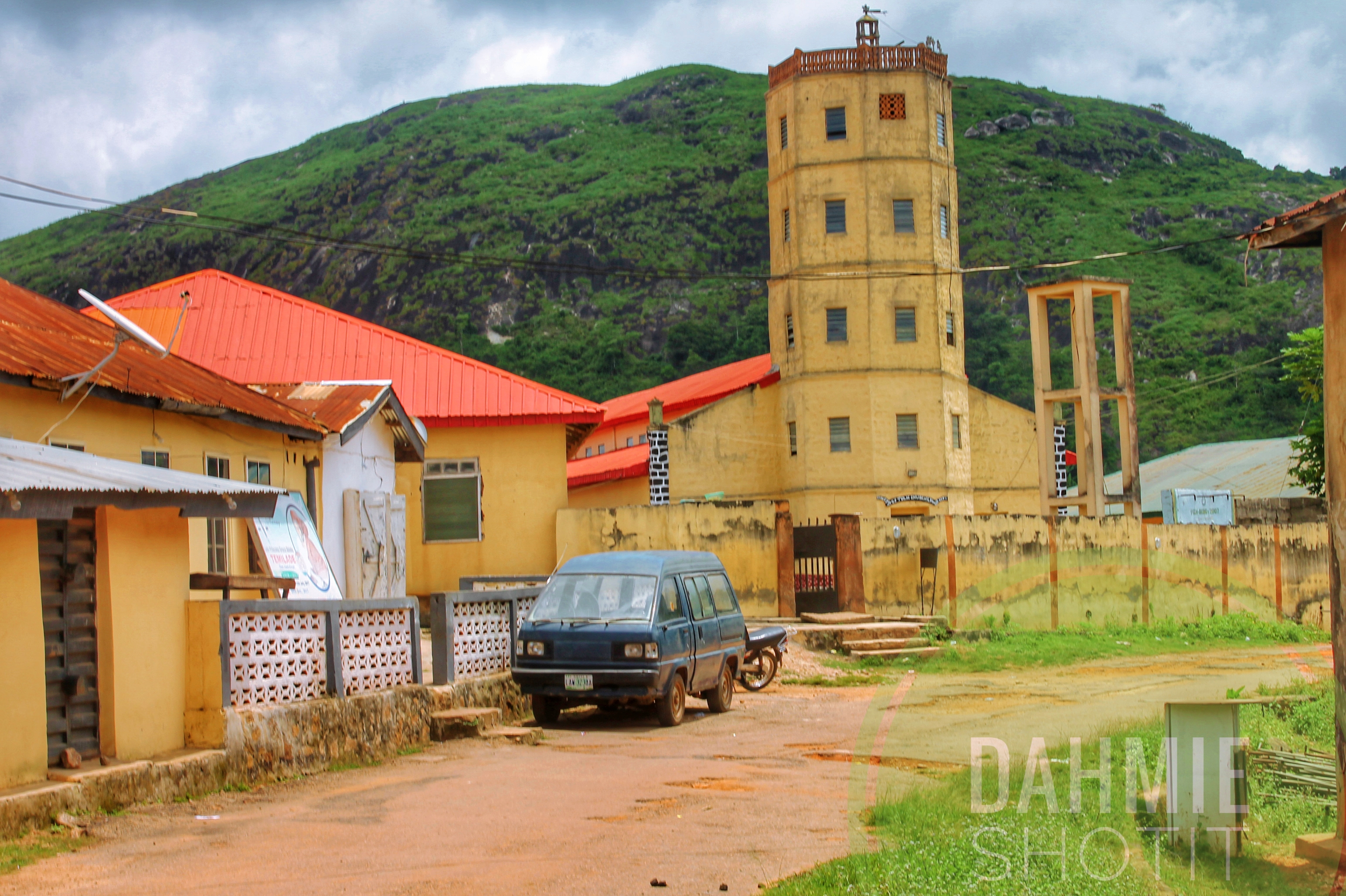
First CAC church in Ilawe Ekiti, Ekiti state

The then Alawe, Oba Afinbiokin Ademileka granted and leased out a parcel of land in Okeloye Quarter to the Church Missionary Society (CMS) to build a church which is the present location of Holy Trinity Anglican Church.

For twelve years, the CMS (Anglican Communion) was the only Christian Church in Ilawe. By 1913, the church had been well established and between 1913 and 1915, a Catechist (Rev. Aladekomo) was resident in Ilawe while Dada become the First Lay Leader (Baba Ẹgbẹ) of the Church and remained so between 1915 and 1953.

Dada, who influenced Christianity to Ilawe, was later very influential with the Colonial Missionaries & Administrator. He ensured that Christianity became a free and legal religion in Ilawe in 1904. He was very popular with the White Missionaries who controlled the CMS in Ekiti. In fact, he later became the Lay President of the whole Ekiti State.

Years Later, the Catholic Church also found its way to Ilawe Ekiti championed by Jacob Bello. Christ Apostolic Church followed suit, championed by Joseph Ojo Ajofoyinbo. With time and coupled with acceptance of Christianity in Ilawe, many other Pentecostal Churches started coming to Ilawe.

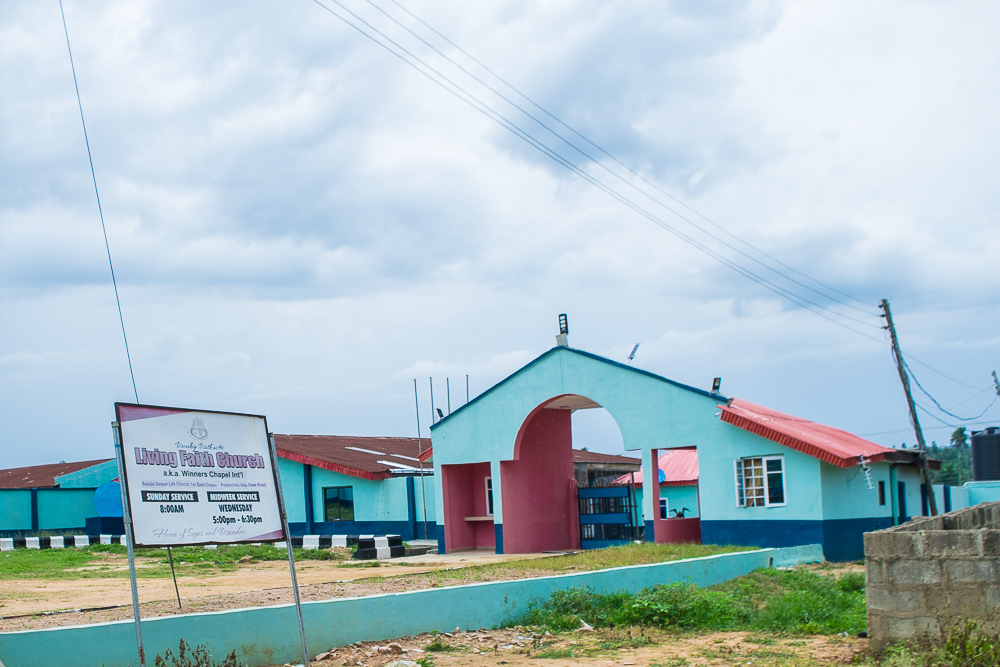
Crown International School, Ilawe Road, Odo, Ado Ekiti

== Education ==
Ilawe-Ekiti is the location of Corpus Christi College secondary school. Along with 100 other secondary schools in Ekiti State, the college was scheduled for renovation in 2012.
