= Yemi Adaramodu =

Nigerian politician and senator

Senator for Ekiti South
- Incumbent
- Assumed office 13 June 2023
- Preceded by: Abiodun Olujimi

Spokesperson, Senate of Nigeria
- Incumbent
- Assumed office 2023

Chairman, Senate Committee on Youth Development
- Incumbent
- Assumed office 2023

Member, Federal House of Representatives
- Constituency: Ekiti South

Chairman, Ekiti South West Local Government

Personal details
- Born: Adeyemi Raphael Adaramodu
- Party: All Progressives Congress
- Website: yemiadaramodu.com

Adeyemi Raphael Adaramodu , commonly known as Yemi Adaramodu, is a Nigerian politician currently serving as the Senator representing Ekiti South Senatorial District in the 10th National Assembly, on the platform of the All Progressives Congress (APC). He also holds the traditional chieftaincy title of Oluomo of Ilawe-Ekiti.

== Political career ==
=== Local government ===
Adaramodu began his political career in local government administration, becoming the Chairman of Ekiti South West Local Government Area at the age of 29. His tenure was marked by a focus on grassroots development and community engagement.

=== Chief of Staff, Ekiti State ===
He subsequently served as Chief of Staff to the Governor of Ekiti State, where he coordinated government operations and supported policy implementation at the state executive level.

=== Federal House of Representatives ===
Adaramodu was later elected to the Federal House of Representatives, where he served as Chairman of the House Committee on Youth Development, focusing on legislation and policy affecting Nigerian youth.

=== Senate (2023–present) ===
In 2023, Adaramodu was elected Senator for Ekiti South Senatorial District, succeeding Abiodun Olujimi and taking his seat in the 10th National Assembly on 13 June 2023. In the Senate, he serves as the official Spokesperson of the Senate and as Chairman of the Senate Committee on Youth Development.

Since assuming office he has overseen a range of constituency projects across the six local government areas of Ekiti South, including road construction and rehabilitation, solar-powered boreholes, community hall renovations, palace reconstruction, distribution of educational materials to secondary schools, agricultural input supply to farmers, skills acquisition and empowerment programmes for youth and women, and free medical outreach.

== Traditional title ==
Adaramodu holds the traditional chieftaincy title of Oluomo of Ilawe-Ekiti, a recognition of his standing within the Ilawe-Ekiti community in Ekiti South West Local Government Area.
