= Abiodun Olujimi =

Nigerian politician (born 1958)

Biodun Olujimi

Senator for Ekiti South
- In office 9 June 2015 – 11 June 2023
- Preceded by: Anthony Adeniyi
- Succeeded by: Yemi Adaramodu

Deputy Governor of Ekiti State
- In office November 2005 – 16 October 2006
- Governor: Ayodele Fayose
- Preceded by: Abiodun Aluko
- Succeeded by: Sikiru Tae Lawal

Personal details
- Born: 25 December 1958 (age 67) Omuo, British Nigeria
- Party: Peoples Democratic Party
- Education: University of Abuja
- Occupation: Politician

Abiodun Christine Olujimi (born 25 December 1958) is a Nigerian politician, who served as senator representing Ekiti South senatorial district from 2015 to 2023 and was minority leader of the Nigerian Senate. She was a board member of Nigerian Communications Commission. She previously served as deputy governor of Ekiti State from November 2005 until her impeachment in October 2006.

== Early life and education ==
Abiodun Christine Olujimi was born in Omuo Ekiti, Ekiti state, Her education started in Our Lady of Apostles in Ibadan, Oyo State and then proceeded to Nigerian Institute of Journalism to obtain a Diploma in 1976. Biodun Olujimi also bagged degrees in Political science and a Postgraduate degree in Public Relations and Marketing from the University of Abuja.

== Career ==
Biodun's started her career as broadcaster and journalist. During her career as a journalist, she worked with the Nigerian Tribune, Nigerian Posts and Telecommunication, Nigerian Television Authority, the Delta Steel Company, Ovwian Aladja, Reflex Concept, DBN Television and was the Manager of DBN TV from 1993 to 1997.

== Politics ==
She joined her husband in politics in 1997 as the National Publicity Secretary of the extinct NCPN, she moved to All Progressive Congress (APC) after the extinction of her former party, and still became the National Publicity Secretary in APC.

In 2002, she joined Peoples Democratic Party (PDP) and this was the beginning of her great achievements in politics. 2003 was the year she was appointed the Special Assistant to the Executive Governor of Ekiti State, from there she was elected to the Federal House of Assembly. She became the Deputy Governor of Ekiti State with Governor Ayo Fayose in 2005. Olujimi attained other great heights in politics; from being the Commissioner for Works and Infrastructure in her state to a Director of Women Affairs. In 2015, she contested for a Senatorial seat and won, and became a senator representing the Ekiti South constituency in the National Assembly under the Peoples Democratic Party.

The Peoples Democratic Party, Ekiti State chapter appointed her as the state party leader in November 2018 to strengthen the state party in preparation for the 2019 elections.

In the 2019 General Elections, she initially lost her seat for representing Ekiti South to the APC candidate Prince Adedayo Clement Adeyeye However, the State Assembly Election Tribunal and the Appeal Court later declared her winner of the Ekiti South Senatorial District. Consequently, she was sworn into the Nigerian Senate by the Senate President on 14 November 2019. In 2020, Olujimi was involved in a verbal war with the former Governor of Ekiti state Ayodele Fayose, where she accused him of manipulating the electoral process at the Ekiti state PDP ward congress.

On 22 March 2021 senator Abiodun Olujimi narrated how she escaped being shot at during the violence that erupted at the House of Assembly bye-election for Ekiti East Constituency 1. The bye-election was to fill in the vacant position of Juwa Adegbuyi, a representative of the constituency who died in February.
