= Gbonyin =

- LGA
- Interactive map of Gbonyin
- Country: Nigeria
- State: Ekiti State
- Capital: Ode-Ekiti

Government
  - Type: Democracy
  - Local Government Chairwoman and the Head of the Local Government Council: Funke Odunlade
  - Local Government Secretary: Omoniyi Ebenezer

Area
  - Total: 391 km^{2} (151 sq mi)

Population (2006)
  - Total: 147,999
  - Density: 379/km^{2} (980/sq mi)
- Time zone: UTC+1 (WAT)
- Postal code: 370

Aiyekire (or Gbonyin) is a Local Government Area of Ekiti State, Nigeria.

The Geographical entity known as Gbonyin Local Government was created on October 1, 1996, out of Ekiti East Local Government having High Chief Zacheaus Adebowale Ofi as the pioneer chairman. Upon the creation of Ekiti State on October 1, 1996, Gbonyin Local Government (officially named Ayekire in the 1999 Constitution of the Federal Republic of Nigeria) is one of the sixteen Local Governments created with the headquarters at Ode Ekiti.

The Local Government is predominantly a homogeneous society and carefully populated by Yoruba speaking people of the South West Zone of Nigeria. The Religions are mainly Christian and Islamic while a percentage of the people are Traditional religion worshipers.

The Local Government is made up of 8 major towns and several villages. All the towns have recognized traditional rulers (Obas).

== Landscape ==
The Local Government Council Area is located in the North Eastern part of Ekiti State and covers about 391 kilometer squares. The local government shares territorial boundaries with seven local government viz; Ise/Emure, Ekiti East, Ikole, Irepodun/Ifelodun and Ado Ekiti Local government in Ekiti State, and Akoko-North/West Local government of Ondo State.

The local government council secretariat is located in the East of Ode Ekiti via the Egbe-Isinbode road.

== Geography/Climate ==
The area of Gbonyin LGA is 391 square kilometres or 151 square miles, and its average annual temperature is 28 degrees Celsius or 82 degrees Fahrenheit. 1,950 mm (77 in) of rainfall per year is estimated to be the area's total annual precipitation. Gbonyin LGA experiences an 11 km/h (6.8 mph) average wind speed, and a 60 percent average humidity level.

== Population ==
According to the 2006 National Population Census figure, the total population of the local government was 147,999; Male: 75,459; Female: 72,734.

== Localities ==
Town in Gbonyin local Government Area.

- Ode Ekiti
- Agbado Ekiti
- Imesi Ekiti
- Aisegba Ekiti
- Egbe Ekiti
- Ijan Ekiti
- Iluomoba Ekiti
- Iro Ekiti.
- Iro Ayetẹju Ekiti

== Villages ==
- Aba Baale
- Aba Jioba
- Ugboeku
- Oke Afa
- Onibedo Camp
- Alarierin
- Surulere Camp
- Aba Oka
- Oguniyi
- Aba Oka
- Isarun Better Life Road
- Ilupeju
- Imoru Mayegun
- The Apostolic Church, Alarudu
- Ologoji Farm Settlement
- Momo Farm Settlement
- Iro Ayeteju; Ijege/Oke Agbani
- Iro-Ayeteju/Egbe; Aponyinbo
- Odi-Olowo
- Apomo
- Ese
- Sakunmi
- Olorunda
- Ipole
- Awara
- and more

== Commerce & Industries ==
The thriving industries in the local government include Timber/Saw mills, rice processing, Garri processing, Palm oil, Kernel processing, Block making, Bakeries, Furnitures, Petrol Stations, Hotels, Printing Press and Banking.

Furthermore, the youths in the local government area are engaged in motor cycle repair, carpentry, fashion designing, hair dressing, small farm holds and petty trading, commercial motorcycle transportation called Okada etc.

In Gbonyin LGA, a range of crops are farmed, including rice, cassava, and oil palm. Numerous businesses, hotels, financial institutions, and educational institutions are located nearby. Trade abounds in the region as well, with the LGA holding a number of markets where a wide range of goods are bought and sold

=== Places of Interest ===
- Little Ose/Egbe Dam
- Oloke Rock at Ode
- Forest Reserve at Egbe
- Apariko Dam at Aisegba
- Omi Agbahan at Iluomoba
- Orisa Gbamo at Agbado
- Ujilogun at Ijan

== Education ==
There are 46 public primary schools, 18 private nursery and primary schools, 12 public secondary schools, 13 private secondary schools in the local government.

=== Public primary schools ===
- Lower Holy Trinity, Aisegba Ekiti
- Upper Holy Trinity, Aisegba Ekiti
- St. James Primary School, Imesi Ekiti
- St. Paul's Primary School, Ijan Ekiti
- Methodist Primary School, Egbe Ekiti
- St. Mary's Primary School, Ode Ekiti
- St. James Primary School, Ijan Ekiti
- Methodist Primary School, Ode Ekiti
- Lower Emmanuel Primary School, Agbado Ekiti
- St. Luke Primary School, Iro Ekiti
- St. Cyprian Primary School, Aisegba Ekiti
- St. John Primary School, Ode Ekiti
- St. Michael Primary School, Iluomoba Ekiti
- St. Paul's Primary School, Agbado Ekiti
- St. Peter's Primary School, Iluomoba
- Upper Emmanuel Primary School, Agbado Ekiti
- L. A. Odiolowo, Imesi Ekiti
- St. Saviour Primary School, iro Ayeteju Ekiti
- Community primary School, Bolorunduro, Aisegba Ekiti
- Community Primary School, Ilupeju, Ijan
- A.U.D. Primary School Agbado ekiti
- A.U.D. Primary School, Ode Ekiti
- CAC Primary School, Ausegba Ekiti
- Community Primary School, Ajebamidele, Iluomoba
- Community Primary School, Olorunda, Imesi Ekiti
- St. Francis Primary School, Imesi Ekiti
- Community Primary School, Iploe Agbado ekiti
- CAC Primary School, Imesi Ekiti
- St. Silas Primary School, Ijan Ekiti
- AUD Primary School, Aisegba Ekiti
- CAC Primary School, Egbe Ekiti
- Community Primary School, Agbonkoji, Egbe Ekiti
- Muslim Primary School, Ijan Ekiti
- St. John Primary School, Iluomoba Ekiti
- St. Victor Primary School, Aisegba Ekiti
- St Michael Primary School Ode Ekiti
- Community Primary School, Surulere Ode Ekiti
- Community Primary School, Aponu, Imesi Ekiti
- CAC Primary School, Iluomoba Ekiti
- C&S Primary School, Aisegba Ekiti
- C&S Primary School Agbado ekiti
- St. Ang. Primary School, Ijan Ekiti
- CAC Primary School, Iro Ekiti
- Community Primary School, Abajioba, Ode Ekiti
- Celestial Primary School, Aisegba Ekiti
- CAC Ijan Ekiti

=== Private Primary Schools ===
- Sterling Nursery and Primary School, Ode Ekiti
- United Nursery and Primary School, Ode Ekiti
- Gofamint Nursery and Primary School, Ode Ekiti
- Christ Majesty Nursery and Primary School, Ode Ekiti
- God's Grace Nursery and Primary School, Aisegba Ekiti
- Jobabeg Primary School, Aisegba Ekiti
- Ife Oluwa Nursery and Primary School, Aisegba Ekiti
- Excellent Gateway Nursery and Primary School, Aisegba Ekiti
- Oluwafunmilayo Nursery and Primary School, Imesi Ekiti
- Toluwa Nursery and Primary School, Imesi Ekiti
- Emmanuel Nursery and Primary School, Agbado Ekiti
- Titilola Nursery and Primary School, Agbado Ekiti
- Bosotos Nursery and Primary School, Agbado Ekiti
- Scyro Nursery and Primary School, Agbado Ekiti
- Life Nursery and Primary School, Agbado Ekiti
- Oluwaseyi Nursery and Primary School, Egbe Ekiti
- Omotola Nursery and Primary School, Iluomoba Ekiti
- Ranti Nursery and Primary School, Iluomoba Ekiti
- Over To God Nursery and Primary School, Egbe-Ekiti

=== Public Secondary Schools ===
- Ode High School, Ode Ekiti
- Aisegba Community Grammar School, Aisegba Ekiti
- Ojugbaye Comprehensive High School, Imesi Ekiti
- Ijanmodu Comprehensive High School, Ijan Ekiti
- Ileowuro High School, Agbado Ekiti
- Community Grammar School, Iulomoba Ekiti\
- Methodist High School, Egbe Ekiti
- Comprehensive High School, Aisegba Ekiti
- Sola Babalola Memorial High School, Iro Ekiti
- Ayeteju Comprehensive High School, Iro Ekiti
- Ayo Daramola Grammar School, Ijan Ekiti
- New Era College, Ode Ekiti

=== Private Secondary Schools ===
- Faith and Love College, Ode Ekiti
- Tasco Secondary School, Ode Ekiti
- Amazing Grace Secondary School, Ode Ekiti
- Christ the Answer College, Aisegba Ekiti
- JOBABEC Secondary School, Aisegba Ekiti
- God Grace Secondary School, Aisegba Ekiti
- Christ International College, Agbado Ekiti
- Royal Academic College, Agbado Ekiti

== Health Care ==
=== Health Facilities ===
1. Comprehensive Health Centre, Ode Ekiti
2. Comprehensive Health Centre, Agbado Ekiti
3. Comprehensive Health Centre, Aisegba Ekiti
4. Comprehensive Health Centre, Imesi Ekiti
5. Comprehensive Health Centre, Ijan Ekiti
6. Basic Health Centre, Ode Ekiti
7. Basic Health Centre, Agbado Ekiti
8. Basic Health Centre, Ipole
9. Basic Health Centre, Aisegba Ekiti
10. Basic Health Centre, Bolorunduro
11. Basic Health Centre, Iluomoba Ekiti
12. Basic Health Centre, Ajebamidele
13. Basic Health Centre, Ijan Ekiti II
14. Basic Health Centre, Ilupeju
15. Basic Health Centre, Egbe Ekiti
16. Basic Health Centre, Iro Ekiti
17. Basic Health Centre, Iro Ayeteju
18. Staff Clinic
19. Model Health Centre, Ode Ekiti

=== Private Hospitals ===
1. Opeyemi Clinic and Maternity, Agbado-Ekiti
2. Biotom Medical Clinic and Maternity, Aisegba Ekiti
3. Evangelic Church of West Africa (ECWA) Hospital, Egbe Ekiti
4. Biotom Medical Clinic and Maternity, Ijan Ekiti
5. Oluseyi Clinic and Maternity, Iluomoba Ekiti
6. Ile Olaolu Clinic, Imesi Ekiti
