= Moba, Nigeria =

Moba
- LGA
- Interactive map of Moba
- Country: Nigeria
- State: Ekiti State
- Headquarter: Otun Ekiti

Government
  - Local Government Chairman and the Head of the Local Government Council: Hon Ibunkun Adeoye Oriyomi
  - Local Government Secretary: Hon Fadugba

Area
  - Total: 199 km^{2} (77 sq mi)

Population (2006)
  - Total: 146,496
  - Density: 736/km^{2} (1,910/sq mi)
- Time zone: UTC+1 (WAT)
- Postal code: 372

Moba is a local government area of Ekiti State, Nigeria. Its headquarters are in the town of Otun.

It has an area of 199 km^{2} and a population of 146,496 at the 2006 census.

The postal code of the area is 372.

== Notable towns ==
Moba consists of the following notable towns:

1. Otun Ekiti
2. Igogo Ekiti
3. Ikun Ekiti
4. Osun Ekiti
5. Erinmope Ekiti
6. Osan Ekiti
7. Aaye-Oja Ekiti
8. Ikosu Ekiti
9. Isaoye Ekiti
10. Epe Ekiti
11. Iro Ekiti
12. Ira Ekiti
13. Irare Ekiti

== Tourism ==
There are several places of interests in the local government that could attract tourists and they include Ero Dam, Ikun; Oore Monumental Palace, Otun; Eyemojo Grave, Osan; Eegun Regalia Costumes, Ikun; and Egi Hill, Igogo.

There are several co-operative societies in the Local Government and also thriving industries which include Timber/Saw mills and Dairy Farms e.g. Ikun Dairy Farm.

== Education ==
There are 19 public primary schools, 15 private nursery/primary schools, 11 junior secondary schools, 11 senior secondary schools and 8 private secondary schools in the local government area.

=== Senior Secondary Schools ===
- Moba Grammar School, Otun Ekiti
- Erinmope Senior High School, Erinmope Ekiti
- Igogo Commercial Senior High School, Igogo Ekiti
- Ifelodun compressive high school igogo ekiti
- Saliu adeoti memorial Comp. Senior High School, Otun Ekiti
- Eyemojo Comp. Senior High School, Osan Ekiti
- Osun Grammar School, Osun Ekiti
- Amure Senior Grammar School Ikun Ekiti
- Aaye-Oja Senior High School, Aaye-Oja Ekiti
- Ikosu Senior High School, Ikosu Ekiti
- Epe Comp. Senior High School, Epe Ekiti

=== Private Secondary Schools ===
- Amazing Grace College, Otun Ekiti
- Adventist High School, Otun Ekiti
- Holy Michael Champions College, Otun Ekiti
- Christ Royal Master College, Otun ekiti
- AUD Islamic High School, Otun Ekiti
- St. Andrew Catholic College, Otun Ekiti
- Ave Maria International Osun Ekiti
- St. Lumen christi Secondary, Otun Ekiti
- Fullnest sccondary school, Otun Ekiti

== Health Care ==
The public hospitals and health/medical centres in the Local Government Area are:

- B. H. C. Aaye-Oja Ekiti
- B. H. C. Irare Ekiti
- B. H. C. Erinmope Ekiti
- C. H. C. Igogo Ekiti
- B. H. C. Isaoye Ekiti
- B. H. C. Ikun Ekiti
- B. H. C. Ikosu Ekiti
- B. H. C. Ogo-Oluwa, Ikun Ekiti
- B. H. C. Osun Ekiti
- B. H. C. Ira Ekiti
- B. H. C. Osan Ekiti
- B. H. C. Epe Ekiti
- B. H. C. Iro Ekiti
- Health Post Orisumibare
- C. H. C. Otun Ekiti
- General Hospital, Otun Ekiti
- Model Hospital, Otun Ekiti

The private hospitals and medical/health centres in the Local Government Area are:

- Adebayo Hospital, Otun-Ekiti
- Ibironke Hospital, Otun-Ekiti
- Emiloju Hospital, Otun-Ekiti
