= Emure =

Emure Ekiti Emure Ule Ewa Emure Ijaloke
- LGA and town
- Nickname: Ule Ewa
- Motto: Peace And Unity
- Interactive map of Emure Ekiti
- Emure Ekiti
- Coordinates: 7°27′N 5°28′E
- Country: Nigeria
- State: Ekiti State

Government
  - Local Government Chairman and the Head of the Local Government Council: Oluwatosin Adedigbo Adedayo
  - The King: Oba Emmanuel Adebowale Adebayo
- Time zone: UTC+1 (WAT)

Emure is a town in the Ekiti State of Nigeria. It is also called Emure Ekiti. It became much better known after the king of Emure's grandson Adewale Ogunleye made it into the NFL for the Chicago Bears.

Emure Ekiti is one of the more prosperous towns in Ekiti. Emure consists of four ancient quarters named Oke Emure, Odo Emure, Idamudu and Ogbontioro.

== Geography ==
Emure LGA has a tropical climate and has the dry and rainy seasons as its two main seasons. Emure LGA's average temperature is 28 degrees Celsius or 82 degrees Fahrenheit, while the humidity level there is around 60%.

=== Climate ===
In Emure, the dry season is hot, muggy, and partially cloudy whereas the wet season is warm, oppressive, and overcast. The average annual temperature ranges from 18 to 32 degrees Celsius (64 to 90 degrees Fahrenheit), rarely falling below 14 °C (58 °F) or rising over 35 °C (95 °F).

From January 22 to April 1, the hot season, with an average daily high temperature exceeding 88 °F, lasts for 2.3 months. Emure, experiences its warmest month of the year in March, with an average high of 89 °F and low of 72 °F.

From June 15 to October 15 (a period known as the "cool season"), there are 4.0 months with an average daily high temperature below 82 °F. In Emure August is the coldest month of the year, with an average low of 69 °F and high of 81 °F.

== Economy ==
Cowpea, cocoa, pepper, and plantains are just a few of the abundant agricultural products produced in Emure. Bead production, fabric weaving, and commerce are some of the area's other significant economic pursuits. There are various markets in Emure LGA where locals can go to buy and sell a variety of goods.

== Education system ==
Education is taken very important. Emure Ekiti has some public secondary schools:

- Ijaloke Grammar School
- Akeju Business College
- Orija High School
- Ekiti State Government Science College Emure
- Emure Model High School
- Eporo High School
- Anaye Community Grammar School

And numerous private secondary schools such as

- Apostolic Faith Secondary School, which is one of the most standard school in Emure Ekiti and her environs.
- Progressive Group of Schools
- St. Paul Grammar School
- God's own comprehensive College
- Christ Our Foundation
- Christ Victory College

== Rulers of Emure Kingdom ==
The Emure Kingdom traces its royal lineage to Oduduwa, the legendary progenitor of the Yoruba people. The ruling dynasty of Emure stems from Oduduwa's son Okanbi, whose son Oranmiyan is a central figure in the foundation of several Yoruba kingdoms, including Ife, Oyo, and Benin.

The founder of the Emure Kingdom was Fagbamila Obadudu, a descendant of Oranmiyan through his son Obele. Fagbamila Obadudu established Emure as a royal center and one of the sixteen crowned kingdoms of Ekiti. His two sons, Abenimota and Adumori, became the progenitors of the two royal houses of Emure. Since the late twentieth century, the kingship of Emure (styled "Elemure") has alternated between these two lineages.

=== Lineage of the Emure Kings ===
Below is a chronological list of the rulers of Emure Kingdom:

Position	Name	Reign
—	Oduduwa	Progenitor of the Yoruba people
—	Okanbi	—
—	Oranmiyan	—
—	Obele	—
—	Fagbamila Obadudu	Founder of old Emure at Igbo Owa
-	Okutuagbonkoji	—
1st Elemure	Abenimota Odunlebiojo	Founder at present site
2nd Elemure	Adumori	—
3rd Elemure	Kango Aladeloye	—
4th Elemure	Ati-Iku Opolo	—
5th Elemure	Ogunragaboja	—
6th Elemure	Atobiloye I	? - 1867
7th Elemure	Aminmin I	1867 - 1870
8th Elemure	Ajirotutu	1870 – 1874
9th Elemure	Famutimi	1876 – 1882
8th contd	Ajirotutu (continued)	1882 – 1896
9th Elemure	Owoso	1896 – 1906
10th Elemure	Atobatele	1907 – 1924
11th Elemure	Arosoye	1924 – 1931
12th Elemure	Odundun Ogunleye I	1932 – 1952
13th Elemure	Aminmin II	1953 – 1963
14th Elemure	Ogunleye II	1965 – 1974
15th Elemure	Oba Adigun Oshin Omiyomade I (Atobiloye II)*	1983 – 2006 (following a 9-year interregnum from 1974 to 1983)
16th Elemure	Oba Emmanuel Adebayo Atayerobiagogo/ Aminmin III	2007 – 2024

=== Cultural Significance ===
The Emure Kingdom continues to play an important role in the cultural and spiritual identity of the Yoruba people in Ekiti State and beyond. The institution of the monarchy, with its alternating succession system, reflects a unique governance structure that preserves both familial heritage and political balance.

=== Proof ===
This article is based on traditional Yoruba oral history and archival documentation from Emure royal records. Additional sources may be cited upon future verification through academic and historical research.
