= Ekiti East =

Ekiti East Omuo Ekiti
- LGA
- Interactive map of Ekiti East
- Country: Nigeria
- State: Ekiti State
- Headquarters: Omuo Ekiti

Government
  - Local Government Chairman and the Head of the Local Government Council: Faleye Tuloko
  - Local Government Secretary: Olorunsogan Ayo Ozone

Area
  - Total: 1,072 km^{2} (414 sq mi)

Population (2006)
  - Total: 137,955
  - Density: 128.7/km^{2} (333.3/sq mi)
- Time zone: UTC+1 (WAT)
- Postal code: 370

Ekiti East is a Local Government Area of Ekiti State, Nigeria. Its headquarters are in the town of Omuo Ekiti. Ekiti East Local Government Area falls within the Southern Senatorial zone of Ekiti State otherwise known as Ekiti South Senatorial District alongside Ekiti South-West, Ikere, Emure, Ise/Orun and Gbonyin local government areas. Ekiti East Local Government Area also forms a Federal Constituency alongside Emure and Gbonyin Local Government Areas.

It has an area of 1,072 km^{2} and a population of 137,955 at the 2006 census. The local government area is bounded to the north by Kogi State, to the east by Ondo State, to the south by Gbonyin local government area, and to the west by Ikole Ekiti local government area.

The postal code of the area is 370.

== See also ==
- Omuo
