= Ido-Osi =

Ido-Osi Osi-Ekiti
- LGA
- Interactive map of Ido-Osi
- Country: Nigeria
- State: Ekiti State
- Headquarter: Ido Ekiti

Government
  - Local Government Chairman and the Head of the Local Government Council: Ayodeji Odutola
  - Local Government Secretary: Akinyemi Ojo
- Time zone: UTC+1 (WAT)

Ido-Osi is a LGA located in Ekiti State, Nigeria.

The local government is full of rural towns and villages and is one of the local government districts of Ekiti State. It is very close to other local districts, including Moba, Ijero, Ilejemeje and Ado. The local government headquarters is hosted by Ido with the secretariat sited in between Ido town and Usi.

== Geography ==
Ido osi LGA experiences two different seasons: the dry season and the rainy season, both of which are classified as tropical. In the LGA, the average temperature is 28 degrees Celsius or 82 degrees Fahrenheit, and the relative humidity is 60 percent.

== Economy ==
Ido osi LGA is a farming area for a number of different crops, including rice, cassava, and cocoa. Additionally, the area has a thriving commercial sector, with marketplaces like the Ido osi modern market where locals of the LGA go to buy and sell a wide variety of things available in the area. Hunting, handicrafts, and the preparation and selling of medicinal roots and herbs are some of the other significant economic activities in the Ido Osi LGA.
