= Ekiti South-West =

- LGA
- Interactive map of Ekiti South-West
- Country: Nigeria
- State: Ekiti State
- Capital: Ilawe Ekiti

Government
  - Local Government Chairman and the Head of the Local Government Council: Kola AmireKolade
  - Local Government Secretary: Dapo Osunniyi

Area
  - Total: 346 km^{2} (134 sq mi)

Population (2006)
  - Total: 165,277
  - Density: 478/km^{2} (1,240/sq mi)
- Time zone: UTC+1 (WAT)
- Postal code: 362

Ekiti South-West is a Local Government Area (LGA) of Ekiti State, Nigeria. Its headquarters are in the town of Ilawe Ekiti. It has an area of 346 km^{2} and a population of 165,277 at the 2006 census. There are 3 towns under Ekiti South-West LGA (Ilawe as the headquarter, Ogotun, and Igbara-Odo).

The postal code of the area is 362.

== History ==
Ekiti Southwest LGA was created in the year 1976.

== Geography/Climate ==
Ekiti Southwest LGA is located in the tropical zone and has a total area of 346 square kilometres. The LGA's average temperature is 28°C/82°F, and the region experiences two distinct seasons: the dry and the wet. Ekiti Southwest LGA experiences 12 km/h (7.5 mph) winds on average.

== Economy ==
With commodities like bananas and plantains being grown nearby, farming is a significant economic activity in the Ekiti Southwest LGA. The region is also home to a thriving trade industry and a number of markets, including the Obada market, where residents of the LGA buy and sell a range of commodities.
