= Ise/Orun =

- LGA
- Interactive map of Ise/Orun
- Country: Nigeria
- State: Ekiti State
- Headquarters: Ise Ekiti

Government
  - Coordinating Director and the Head of the Local Government Council: L.S Oladunjoye

Area
  - Total: 432 km^{2} (167 sq mi)

Population (2006)
  - Total: 113,754
  - Density: 263/km^{2} (682/sq mi)
- Time zone: UTC+1 (WAT)
- Postal code: 361

Ise/Orun is a Local Government Area of Ekiti State, Nigeria. Its headquarters are in the town of Ise Ekiti.

Ise/Orun Local Government Area, one of Ekiti State's 16 operational LGAs, is located in Ise Ekiti Town and houses its administrative headquarters. It is included in the state's Ekiti South senatorial district along with the local government areas of Ekiti South-West, Ikere, Emure, Ekiti East, and Gbonyin (Aiyekire).

The ten wards operating under the area council are represented by the 11 elected councilors of this local government region. The local government council is in charge of the LGA's public administration.

It has an area of 432 km^{2} and a population of 113,754 at the 2006 census.

The postal code of the area is 361.

== Economy ==
Ise/Orun LGA is known for its farming, with a range of crops like maize, cassava, and pepper cultivated there. Additionally, the region is home to a variety of markets where residents of the LGA can buy and sell a wide range of goods. The LGA also has significant blacksmithing, textile weaving, cocoa, timber and hunting industries.

== Geography/Climate ==
In Ise-Ekiti, the dry season is hot, muggy, and partially cloudy whereas the wet season is warm, unpleasant, and overcast. The temperature rarely falls below 58 °F or rises over 95 °F throughout the year, usually fluctuating between 64 °F and 90 °F.

With an average daily high temperature of 88 °F, the hot season lasts for 2.3 months, from January 22 to April 1. With an average high of 89 °F and low of 72 °F, March is the hottest month of the year in Ise-Ekiti.

With an average daily maximum temperature below 82 °F, the chilly season lasts for 4.0 months, from June 16 to October 15. With an average low of 69 °F and a high of 81 °F, August is the coolest month of the year in Ise-Ekiti.

With a total area of 432 square kilometres (167 sq mi) and an average temperature of 27 °C (81 °F), Ise/orun LGA is quite large. In the LGA, the average humidity is 64% and the average wind speed is 11 km/h (6.8 mph).
