= Ikole =

Ikole Egbeoba
- LGA and town
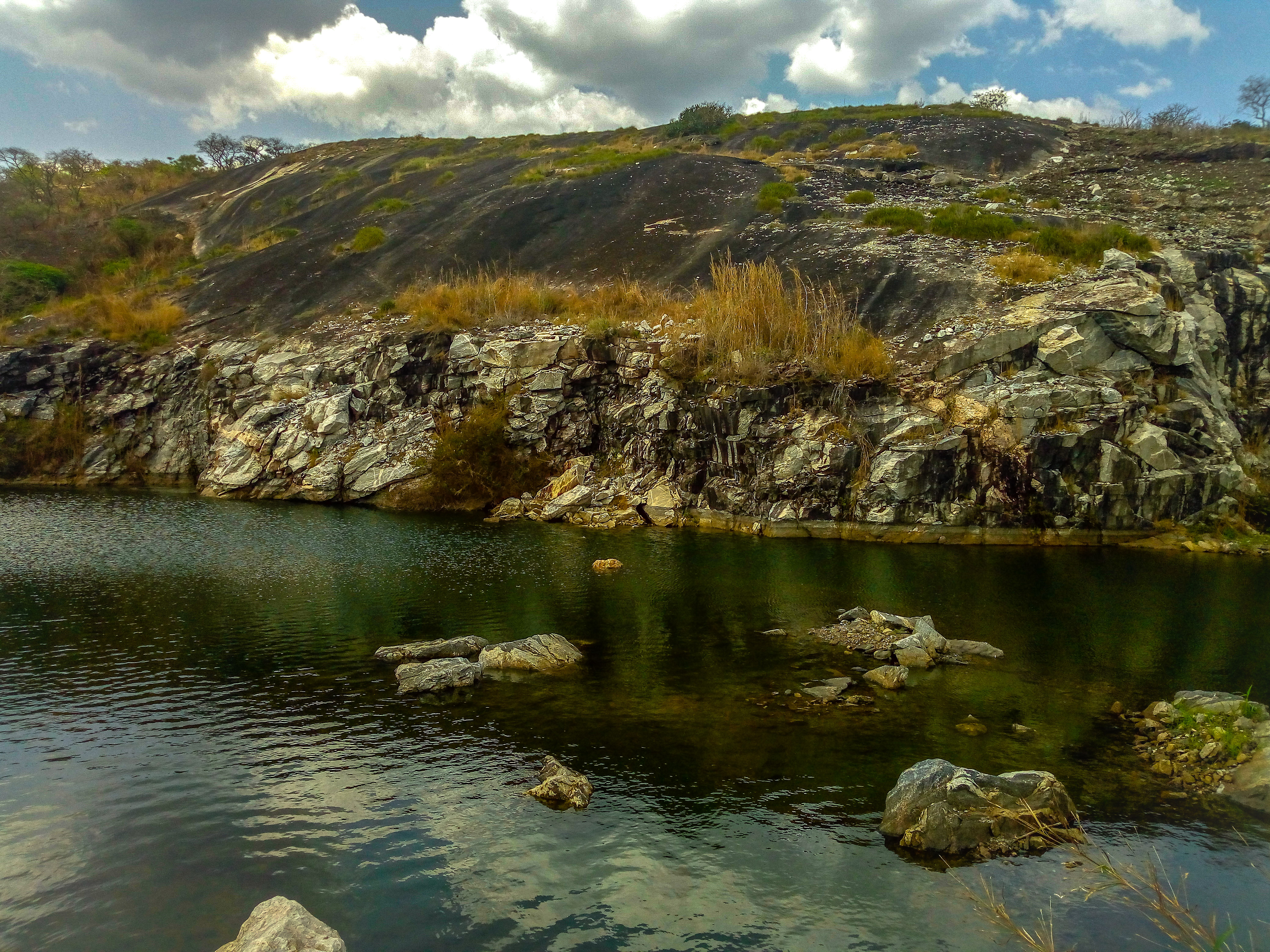
- Waterside Hill of Ikole Town.
- Interactive map of Ikole
- Location in Nigeria
- Coordinates: 7°47′0″N 5°31′0″E
- Country: Nigeria
- State: Ekiti State

Government
  - Local Government Chairman and the Head of the Local Government Council: Olominu Sola Ebenezer
  - Local Government Secretary: Ogungbemi Oluwadare Michael

Area
  - Total: 321 km^{2} (124 sq mi)

Population (2006)
  - Total: 168,436
  - Density: 525/km^{2} (1,360/sq mi)
- Time zone: UTC+1 (WAT)
- Postal code: 370

Ikole is a town and Local Government Area of Ekiti State, Nigeria. The current Chairman of the Local Government is Prince Olominu Sola Ebenezer, who polled a total of 21,228 votes to defeat other candidates in the 2019 local government election in Ekiti State, Nigeria that was organised by the state Independent Electoral Commission (SIEC). He was sworn in alongside other newly elected chairpersons and vice chairpersons for the 16 Local Government Area of Ekiti State, Nigeria by Dr. Kayode Fayemi, governor of the state on 31 December 2019. The Local Government Chairman is the Head of the Local Government Council, as well as the approving officer for funds disbursement and the Chief Security Officer for the Ikole Local Government Area. Prince Olominu Sola administration has prioritised infrastructural development in the area of boreholes rehabilitation, electricity reconnection of Ara Ekiti, construction of blocks of locks up shops, as well as investment in basic education and grassroots sports development, and urban renewal policies for improved trade and commerce.

It has an area of 321 km^{2} (124 sq mi) and a population of 168,436 at the 2006 census.

The postal code of the area is 370.

== People ==
The Local Government is predominantly a homogenous society and carefully populated by Ekiti speaking people of the South West Zone of Nigeria. The religion of the people are mainly Christian and Islamic religious while a percentage of the people are Traditional religion worshippers.

Ikole LGA is named after the principal town of the area, Ikole Ekiti. The traditional ruler Ikole town is the Elekole of Ikole, who also doubles as the paramount ruler of Egbeoba (Literally meaning, Confederation of Obas) Kingdom alluding to Ikole LGA's make up of several other constituent towns with their own traditional rulers and Chiefs. There are 24 state level recognised Obas in Ikole LGA alone, a unique feature of this area contrasted with other areas of Ekiti. Each of these Obas are independent. History holds that between 1900 and 1920, active migration of far flung villages and towns deep in the forest were encouraged towards a new conurbation under the umbrella of Egbeoba leading up to the formation of modern Egbeoba Kingdom under the then Elekole Adeleye I, a retired school teacher. According to JET Babatola, "This community and others around Ikole resettled along the Ikole-Kabba road due to the influence of the late Elekole (an ex-policeman) who asked them to settle nearby to influence their trade and economic potentials prior to the 1920 Oke Eniju revolt and its consequences".

== Towns and Villages ==
The LGA comprises twenty-five towns and villages. Towns in the LGA are

- Ikole
- Ijesha Isu
- Oke Ayedun
- Ootunja
- Odo-Oro
- Ipao
- Itapaji
- Ara
- Isaba
- Usin
- Orin Odo
- Odo Ayedun
- Ayebode
- Oke Ako
- Irele
- Iyemero
- Ikosi
- Igbona
- Asin
- Esun
- Temidire
- Ikunri
- Ijebu-Agege
- Ilamo
- Ikoyi

Among the villages in the LGA are

- Aba Dam
- Ita Gbangba
- Aba Audu
- Aba Fatunla
- Arinta
- Aba Ebira, Ayedun
- Aba oko Ijebu
- Iwetin
- Aba Oke Oko, Igbona

== Economy ==
The thriving industries in the local government are Agriculture and Lumbering which include Timber/Saw mills which include Olo Sawmill, Okejebu, Eleyero Sawmill, Ilamo and Ara Sawmill, Ara; Pharmacies which include Chuks Pharmacy and Okoli Pharmacy both located at Ikole. Ikole's land are one of the most fertile, and with high degree of accessibility to water bodies. Itapaji dam with enormous mini-hydroelectric power potential, as well as water supply opportunities for irrigation and townships is located in Ikole. Even as Oye river nearby flows into River Ele and provides substantial alluvial deposits in the Ikole plains for year-round agriculture. Ero dam in Moba is also nearby. The first major cattle ranch in Nigeria, the Oke Ako Cattle Ranch established by the then Western Region Government is located in Ikole, as is the Agriculture Development Project of the state government.

The place in the Ikole Local Government that attracts tourists from all over is the Itapaji Water Dam, Itapaji-Ekiti. Ikole is also home to several educational institutions including a campus of the Federal University, Oye and a Federal Government College.

== Notable people ==
- Orlando Julius, Nigerian afrobeat, musician born in Ikole in 1943
- Goldie, artist
