= Adedayo Clement Adeyeye =

Nigerian journalist and politician

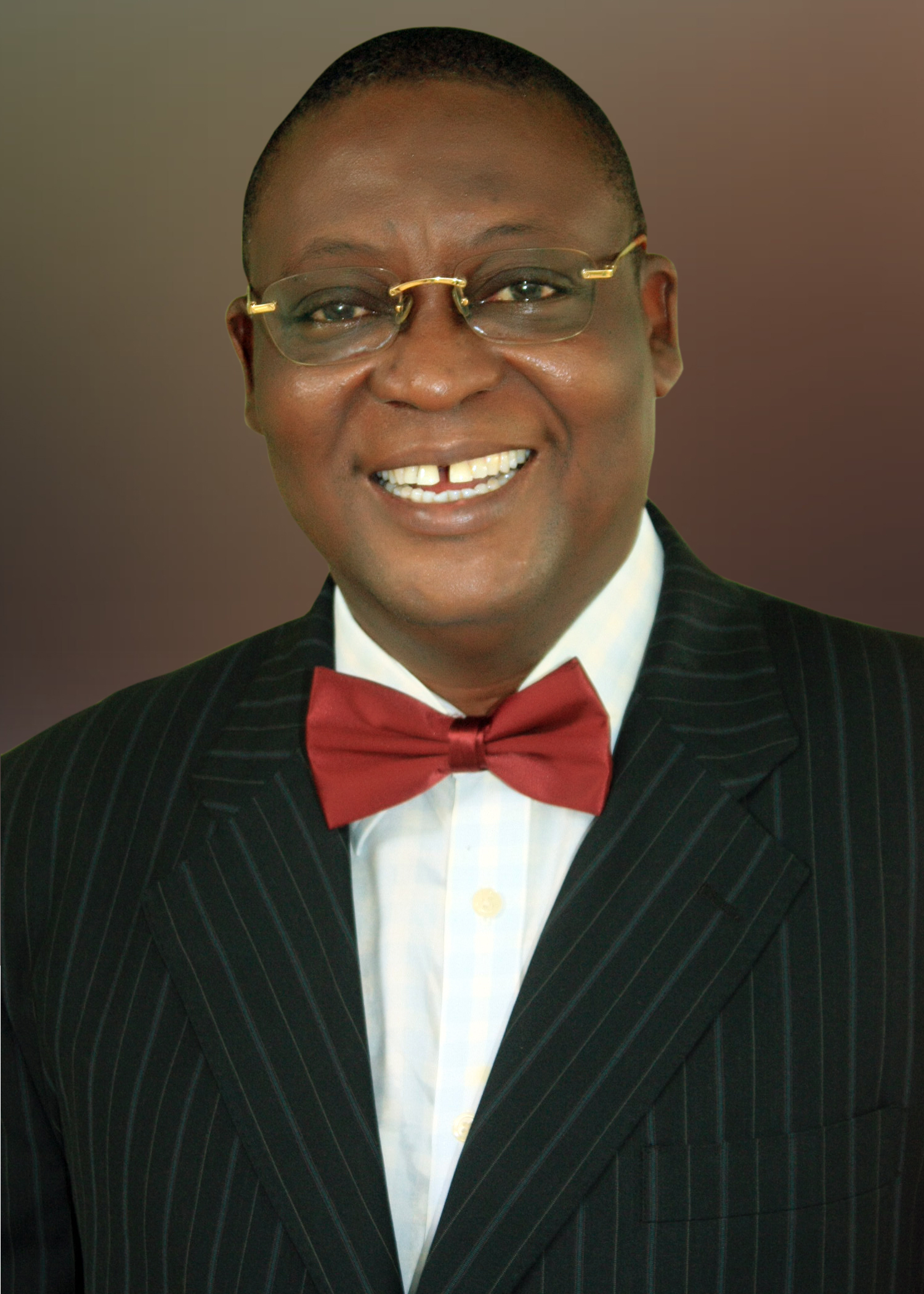
- Prince Adeyeye

Chairman, Nigerian Ports Authority

Personal details
- Born: 4 April 1957 (age 69) Ikere-Ekiti, British Nigeria (present-day Nigeria)
- Party: All Progressives Congress Nigeria
- Other party: National Democratic Coalition; Alliance for Democracy
- Education: St. John's Primary School; Christ's School Ado Ekiti
- Alma mater: University of Ibadan; University of Lagos
- Awards: Universal Basic Education Commission (UBEC) award

Adedayo Clement Adeyeye (//; born 4 April 1957) is a Nigerian politician, journalist, and lawyer. He is a member of the All Progressives Congress and has served as a Senator for Ekiti South Senatorial District and as Minister of State for Works. He has held roles as a spokesperson for the Alliance for Democracy and as National Publicity Secretary of Afenifere, a Pan-Yoruba socio-political group. He was appointed Chairman of the Nigerian Ports Authority in July 2024. Earlier in his career, Adeyeye worked as a journalist at the Federal Radio Corporation of Nigeria and as an editor at The Punch newspaper.

== Background ==
Adeyeye was born on 4 April 1957 in Ise-Ekiti to the royal family of Oba David Opeyemi Adeyeye, Agunsoye II, the Arinjale of Ise Ekiti (who reigned between 1932 and 1976), and Olori Mary Ojulege Adeyeye, a princess of Are, Ikere-Ekiti.

His grandfather was Oba Aweloye I, Arinjale of Ise Ekiti (1887–1919).

== Education ==
Between 1964 and 1968, Adeyeye attended St. John's Primary School in Ikere-Ekiti for his primary education. He attended Annunciation school (1969–1973), and then Christ's School Ado Ekiti (1973–1975).

Adeyeye holds a bachelor's degree in political science from the University of Ibadan (1978) and a master's degree in political science (international relations) from the University of Lagos (1981). He also obtained a law degree from the University of Lagos in 1986 and was called to the Nigerian Bar Association in 1987.

== Professional career ==
Adeyeye is the Chairman of the Nigerian Ports Authority, as of 2024. He was appointed to this position on 13 July 2024 by President Bola Ahmed Tinubu.

Adeyeye was a teacher at Isuikwuato High School, Isuikwuato, Imo State during his National Youth service (1978–1979) and proceeded to teach at Mary Immaculate Grammar School, Ado-Ekiti (1980). Adeyeye made the switch to journalism in 1981 and was Editor II at the Federal Radio Corporation of Nigeria (FRCN), Ikoyi, between 1981 and 1982. He had a brief stint at Rank Xerox Limited in 1983 where he was a Senior Sales Executive. Between 1983 and 1987, he held various editorial positions at The Punch newspapers. During his active years in legal practice, Adeyeye was the Principal Partner at the law firm of Dayo Adeyeye & Co. between 1990 and 2000.

=== Politics ===
Adeyeye was a member of the National Democratic Coalition (NADECO) who was involved in the national struggles to end military rule and facilitate a return to democracy in Nigeria.

He was Director of Publicity, Falae for President Campaign Organisation (1990–1992), Adviser on policy and Press Matters, M.K.O. Abiola for President Campaign Organisation (1993), spokesperson for the Alliance for Democracy (AD), and a member of the South-West Delegation to the Nigerian leaders of Thought Conference, Abuja. Adeyeye was the youngest of the 21 leaders who represented the South Western zone of Nigeria at the Conference (2001).

Adeyeye was also the National Publicity secretary of the Pan Yoruba Socio-political group called Afenifere between 2001 and 2004 as well as the spokesperson of the AD between 2004 and 2006.

In 2006, Adeyeye was an Ekiti State governorship aspirant under AD, which later metamorphosed into the Action Congress of Nigeria, and was runner-up to Governor Kayode Fayemi in the primary elections, after which 13 of the 16 aspirants defected from the Action Congress of Nigeria to the People's Democratic Party (PDP). Adeyeye was among those who defected.

After the 2007 election, Adeyeye was nominated for a ministerial position under President Umaru Musa Yar'Adua, but his final appointment was reported to have been opposed due to his past roles as spokesperson for the opposition party and National Publicity Secretary of Afenifere.

Adeyeye was subsequently appointed Executive Chairman of the Ekiti State Universal Basic Education Board (SUBEB) under Governor Segun Oni. During his tenure, the board received the Universal Basic Education Commission (UBEC) award for the South-West region in 2008 and 2009, with the 2008 award including a ₦70 million cash prize used for regional school infrastructure. He was also named the most innovative SUBEB chairman by the Presidential Committee on Schools' debate in 2009.

In 2014, Adeyeye was nominated by President Goodluck Jonathan as a Minister of the Federal Republic of Nigeria. His nomination was approved by the Nigerian Senate and he was sworn in by President Goodluck Jonathan on 9 July 2014 as Minister of State for Works. He served as Minister until the end of President Goodluck Jonathan's administration on 29 May 2015.

Adeyeye was appointed by the Ekiti State Government as Pro Chancellor of the Ekiti State University in June 2015 and he is the current chairman of the university's Governing Council.

In 2018, Adeyeye declared interest in the race for Ekiti Governorship seat and ran for the ticket of the Peoples Democratic Party (PDP) but lost to Kolapo Olusola-Eleka, who was supported by the sitting Governor, Peter Ayodele Fayose. This led him and his supporters to defect to the All Progressives Congress (APC) ahead of the election, which was won by the APC candidate. Adeyeye is the Chairman of Southwest Agenda'23 (SWAGA), which has a presence across multiple states in Nigeria.

=== National Caretaker Committee ===
Following the inauguration of the National Caretaker Committee of the PDP on 7 June 2016, Adeyeye was nominated as the representative of the South-Western Region of Nigeria. He was subsequently appointed as the National Publicity Secretary of the party under the leadership of Senator Ahmed Makarfi on 9 June 2016 and currently serves the party in that capacity. Adeyeye stopped acting in that capacity after the administration of party's executive committee headed by Prince Uche Secondus. He later contested the 8 May 2018 Governorship Primaries of his party in Ekiti State, but he lost.

== Campaign for Ekiti State Governorship ==
Adeyeye was an aspirant for the Ekiti State 2018 gubernatorial elections under the platform of the PDP.

In an interview with the Leadership newspaper, Adeyeye outlined an eleven-point campaign platform focusing on agriculture, education, employment, health, and social welfare.

== Senatorial aspirations ==
Adeyeye declared for Senate on Thursday 6 September 2018 at Ise Ekiti during the Senatorial meeting of the party held in his home and attended by party leaders and aspirants from the zone.

Adeyeye defeated Senator Biodun Olujimi of PDP in Ekiti South Senatorial District in the National Assembly election conducted on Saturday, 23 February 2019. The Returning Officer for Ekiti South Senatorial District, Professor Laide Lawal, returned Prince Adeyeye, elected having scored 77,621 votes to defeat his closest rival, Olujimi, who polled 53,741 votes. During the 2019 election tribunal, his closest rival, Olujimi was declared winner after the result was recalculated.
