= Oye Ekiti =

- LGA and town
- Interactive map of Oye Ekiti
- Location in Nigeria
- Coordinates: 7°47′58″N 5°19′42″E
- Country: Nigeria
- State: Ekiti State

Government
  - Local Government Chairman and the Head of the Local Government Council: Oluwole Paul
  - Local Government Secretary: Ayodeji Omowaye

Population (2006)
  - Total: 134,210
- Time zone: UTC+1 (WAT)
- Website: http://ekitistate.gov.ng/administration/local-govt/oye-lga/

Oye is a town and local government area in Ekiti State, Nigeria. Oye Local Government Area was carved out from the defunct Ekiti North Local Government on 17 May 1989.

Oye Local Government is bounded by Ilejemeje Local Government to the North, Irepodun/Ifelodun to the South, Ikole local Government to the East and Ido/Osi Local Government to the West.

It comprises the following towns and villages: Oye Ekiti, Ilupeju Ekiti, Ayegbaju Ekiti, Ire Ekiti, Itapa Ekiti, Osin Ekiti, Ayede Ekiti, Itaji Ekiti, Imojo Ekiti, Ilafon Ekiti, Isan Ekiti, Ilemeso Ekiti, Omu Ekiti, Ijelu Ekiti, Oloje Ekiti and a host of others.

The people of the Oye local government are members of the Ekiti subethnic group, and they speak the Ekiti dialect.

== Economy ==
In Oye LGA, trade is a significant economic activity. The region is home to several markets, including the Menara market, where a wide variety of goods are bought and sold. The residents of Oye LGA also engage in major economic activities such farming, food processing, craftsmaking, textile weaving, and wood carving.

== Climate ==
The dry season in Oye-Ekiti is hot, muggy, and partially cloudy whereas the wet season is warm, oppressive, and overcast. The temperature rarely falls below 13 °C (56 °F) or rises over 35 °C (95 °F) throughout the year, often ranging from 17 °C (62 °F) to 32 °C (90 °F).

With an average daily high temperature of 31 °C (88 °F), the hot season lasts for 2.6 months, from January 23 to April 9. With an average high of 32 °C (89 °F) and low of 21 °C (70 °F), March is the warmest month of the year in Oye-Ekiti.

With an average daily maximum temperature below 27 °C (81 °F), the chilly season lasts for 3.9 months, from June 19 to October 16. With an average low of 19 °C (66 °F) and high of 26 °C (79 °F), August is the coldest month of the year in Oye-Ekiti.
