= Ilejemeje =

- LGA
- Interactive map of Ilejemeje
- Location within Nigeria
- Country: Nigeria
- State: Ekiti State
- Headquarter: Iye Ekiti

Government
  - Type: Local Government
  - Local Government Secretary: Ayegbusi Ayomide David oluwatimileyin iyanu

Area
  - Total: 95 km^{2} (37 sq mi)

Population (2006)
  - Total: 43,530
  - Density: 460/km^{2} (1,200/sq mi)
- Time zone: UTC+1 (WAT)
- Postal code: 372

Ilejemeje is a Local Government Area of Ekiti State, Nigeria, consisting of seven towns. Its present headquarters are in the town of Iye Ekiti.

It has an area of 95 km^{2}, and had a population of 43,530 at the 2006 census. Its postal code is 372.

== Geography ==
Ilejemeje LGA has a total size of 95 square kilometres or 37 square miles with an average temperature of 28 °C (82 °F). The LGA's average wind speed is 10 km/h (6.2 mph), while the area's average humidity is 63%.

Geographical coordinates are 7.958367 and 5.23734.

== Economy ==
With a variety of crops farmed in the Ilejemeje LGA, including pepper, coconut, cassava, and cocoa, farming is a significant economic activity for the locals. With various marketplaces in the LGA where a diverse range of goods are bought and sold, trade is also thriving there. Pottery, hunting, and wood carving are among of the other significant economic pursuits of the residents of Ilejemeje LGA.
