= Ikere-Ekiti =

- City and LGA
- Interactive map of Ikere-Ekiti
- Location in Nigeria
- Coordinates: 7°30′N 5°14′E
- Country: Nigeria
- State: Ekiti State

Government
  - Local Government Chairman and the Head of the Local Government Council: Hon (Sqn Ldr) Olu Adamolekun
  - Asiwaju of Ikere-Land: Chief Wole Olanipekun, SAN.

Population (2006)
  - Total: 147,255
- Time zone: UTC+1 (WAT)

Ikere-Ekiti, also known as Ikere or Ikerre, is a city in Ekiti State of Nigeria. It is an agricultural and mine centre. According to the 1963 and 1991 census, the population was 114,780 and 60,257 respectively, but the 2006 census recorded it to be 147,355.

== Geography ==
Ikere LGA has a total size of 202 square kilometres and is distinguished by several hills, including the Orole and Olosunta hills. The area's average annual temperature is 27 degrees Celsius or 81 degrees Fahrenheit, and its total annual precipitation is estimated to be 1,850 mm (73 in).

=== Climate ===
In Ikere-Ekiti, the dry season is hot, muggy, and partly cloudy whereas the wet season is warm, oppressive, and overcast. The temperature rarely drops below 14 °C (58 °F) or rises over 35 °C (95 °F) throughout the year, usually fluctuating between 18 °C (64 °F) and 32 °C (90 °F).

From January 22 to March 30, the hot season, with an average daily high temperature exceeding 31 °C (88 °F), lasts for 2.2 months. Ikere-Ekiti experiences its hottest month of the year in March, with an average high of 31 °C (88 °F) and low of 22 °C (72 °F).

From June 15 to October 12, the chilly season, which has an average daily high temperature below 28 °C (82 °F), lasts for 3.9 months. In Ikere-Ekiti, August is the coldest month of the year, with average lows of 21 °C (69 °F) and highs of 27 °C (81 °F).

== Economy ==
Ikere LGA is an agricultural area notable for the cultivation of a variety of crops including maize, okro, oil palm, yam, and cassava. The LGA also has a number of markets that offer venues for the trade of a variety of goods and services. Tailoring, blacksmithing, and the care and raising of domestic animals are additional significant economic activity in the Ikere LGA.
