= Irepodun/Ifelodun =

Coordinates: 7°37′16″N 5°13′17″E

- LGA
- Interactive map of Irepodun/Ifelodun
- Country: Nigeria
- State: Ekiti State
- Headquarters: Igede Ekiti

Government
  - Local Government Chairman and the Head of the Local Government Council: Pastor Olowoyo Sunday
  - Local Government Secretary: Adebola Adeyeye

Area
  - Total: 356 km^{2} (137 sq mi)

Population (2006)
  - Total: 129,149
  - Density: 363/km^{2} (940/sq mi)
- Time zone: UTC+1 (WAT)
- Postal code: 362

Irepodun/Ifelodun is a Local Government Area of Ekiti State, Nigeria. Irepodun/Ifelodun is predominantly a homogeneous society and carefully populated by Yoruba speaking people of the South West of Nigeria. It has an area of 356 km^{2} and a population of 129,149 at the 2006 census. The major religions of the people are Christianity and Islam while a percentage of the people are traditional religion worshippers.

The thriving industries in the local government include timber and saw mills which include Mighty Sawmill at Igede-Ekiti, Ilamoye Sawmill at Igede-Ekiti, Olorunde Sawmill at Iyin-Ekiti, Igbemo Rice at Igbemo Ekit, ROMACO Company at Igbemo Ekit, Okeorun Sawmill at Orun-Ekiti, Osalade Sawmil at Orun-Ekiti, Oke Uba Sawmill at Awo-Ekiti and Iyedi Sawmill at Igbemo-Ekiti; photo studios; and Hotels, some of which include Corner Stone Hotel, God's Health Hotel, Liberty Hotel and many more.

The places in the Irepodun Local Government that attract tourists from all over are the Osun Tourist Center and Elemi Tourist Center, both located at Igede-Ekiti.

The postal code of the area is 362.

== Geography ==
The Irepodun/Ifelodun LGA covers an area of 356 km^{2} (137 sq mi) and experiences average temperatures of 27 °C (81 °F). Esu Hills are one of the numerous hills in the region. The Osun, Orunro, Ogbese and Elemi rivers are among the many rivers and tributaries that flow through the Irepodun/Ifelodun LGA, where the average humidity is 69 percent. Esu Hills is one of the numerous hills in the region. Irepodun/Ifelodun LGA was created on the 11th day of June, 1989 from Ekiti central LGA.

== Towns & Villages ==
The major towns in Irepodun/Ifelodun are:

- Igede-Ekiti
- Iyin-Ekiti
- Orun-Ekiti
- Awo-Ekiti
- Iropora-Ekiti
- Eyio-Ekiti
- Esure-Ekiti
- Iworoko-Ekiti
- Are-Ekiti
- Afao-Ekiti
- Araromi Obo-Ekiti
- Igbemo-Ekiti
- Ikogosi-Ekiti
- Aramoko-Ekiti
- Erijiyan Ekiti

Irepodun/Ifelodun also comprises villages and farmsteads which include:

- Odo Uro
- Ejiko
- Okoro
- Amadin
- Itaasae
- Aba Olorunda
- Aroto
- Tungba
- Ita Ake
- Olusegun Camp
- Oriokuta Camp
- Aba Osun
- Asa Oloro
- Abuja Camp
- Surulere
- Oriokuta Camp
- Kajola Camp
- Ajebamidele I
- Araromi Oke Aro
- Ajayi Oke
- Ajayi Odo
- Temidire Camp
- Orisumibare Camp
- Ajebamidele II
- Kosubu Town
- Ita Oko Aba Camp
- Igbo Eku Camp

== Gallery ==
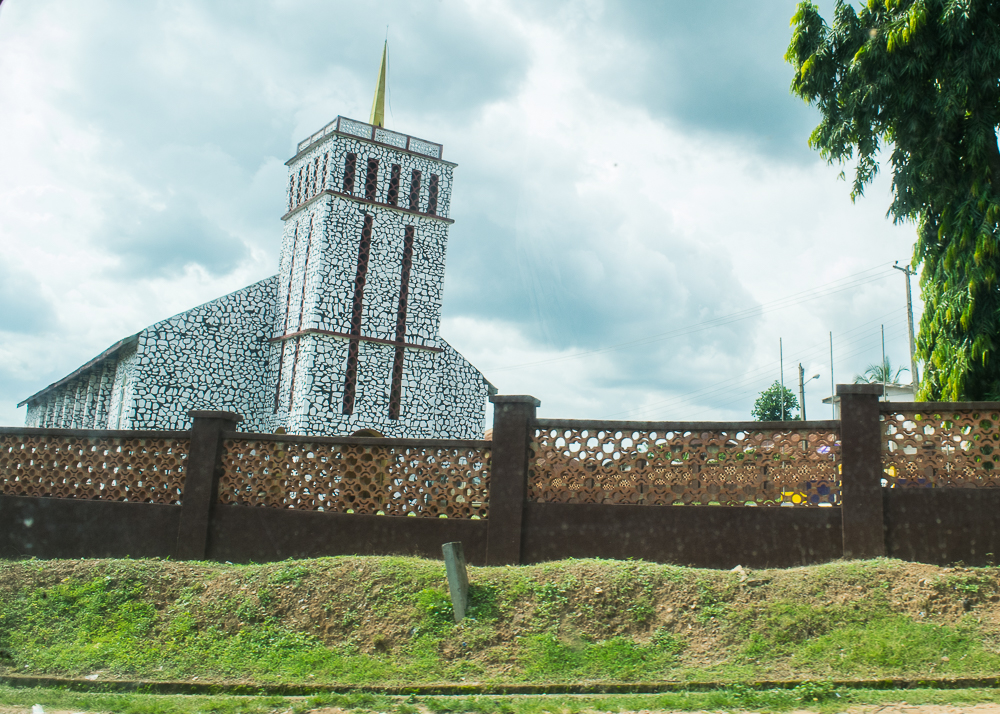
Anglican church, Igede-Ekiti
