= Efon =

- LGA
- Interactive map of Efon
- Location within Nigeria
- Coordinates: 7°22′0″N 3°38′0″E
- Country: Nigeria
- State: Ekiti State
- Headquarter: Efon-Alaaye

Government
  - Local Government Chairman and the Head of the Local Government Council: Segun Afolabi
  - Local Government Secretary: J.S Afolayan

Area
  - Total: 232 km^{2} (90 sq mi)

Population (2006)
  - Total: 86,941
  - Density: 375/km^{2} (971/sq mi)
- Time zone: UTC+1 (WAT)
- Postal code: 362

Efon is a Local Government Area of Ekiti State, Nigeria. Its headquarters are in the town of Efon-Alaaye.

This local government area was established primarily to bring the local population into the federal government's awareness and to open up opportunities for equitable development.

It has an area of 232 km^{2} and a population of 86,941 at the 2006 census.

The postal code of the area is 362.

== History ==
Before Nigeria gained independence, the local government that is today known as Efon Local Government saw a number of transformations. This is demonstrated by the fact that Efon Alaaye served as the administrative center for the previous Ekiti West District Council, which was established in 1955. After 18 years, the District headquarters was shifted to Ijero, Ekiti, in 1973 for what could only be described as administrative convenience.

Ekiti West Local Government was established in 1976 as a follow-up to the establishment of Local Governments, with its administrative center in Aramoko, Ekiti. The Local Government was the home of Efon Alaaye. When Efon Alaaye received Efon Native Authority in 1981 as a result of its search for a local government, history was once more made.

On December 4, 1996, a reprieve finally materialized when Efon Local Government was established, its headquarters being located in Efon Alaaye. The Local Government has borders with Osun State's Ijebu-Ijesa in the west, Erio Ekiti in the east, Esa-Oke in the north, and Ogotun Ekiti in the south.

== Geography ==
The Efon local government area has a total size of 232 square kilometres or 90 square miles, and its terrain is made up of a number of hills of various heights. According to estimates, the LGA's average temperature is 29 degrees Celsius or 84 degrees Fahrenheit, and its average humidity is 60 percent.

=== Climate ===
The average annual temperature ranges from 17 to 32 degrees Celsius (63 to 89 degrees Fahrenheit), with lows and highs of 14 °C (57 °F) and 34 °C (94 °F), respectively.

== Economy ==
The primary economic activity of the residents of the Efon local government area is agriculture. Kolanuts, cocoa, and maize are among the numerous crops that are grown there. The trade sector of the Efon local government area is also a vital component of the local economy. The LGA is home to various markets, including the Oka Modern market, where a wide variety of goods are bought and sold.
