= Ijero Ekiti =

Town in Oyo state, Nigeria

Ijero Ekiti Ajoro ni a n pe ni Ijero
- Town and LGA
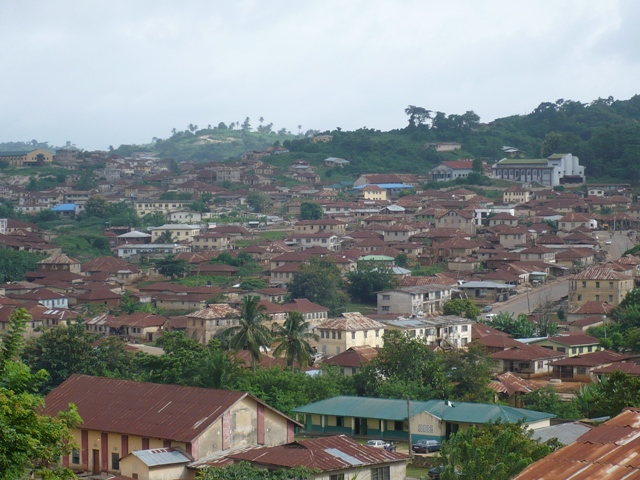
- Interactive map of Ijero Ekiti
- Location within Nigeria
- Coordinates: 7°49′N 5°5′E
- Country: Nigeria
- State: Ekiti State

Government
  - Local Government Chairman and the Head of the Local Government Council: Abayomi Folowosele

Population (2006)
  - Total: 165,099
- Time zone: UTC+1 (WAT)
- Postal code: 372109

Ijero Ekiti is a town and LGA in Ekiti State of Nigeria in West Africa. Ijero Ekiti is situated in the northwestern part of Ekiti State. Ijero Ekiti is the Local Government Headquarters of Ijero. The main language spoken by the indigenes of Ijero Ekiti is Ekiti dialect and the Yoruba language.

Ijero Ekiti is about seven hours drive to Abuja, The Federal Capital Territory of Nigeria, also about five hours drive to Lagos City Metropolis and about one hour drive to Ado Ekiti, the Capital of Ekiti State.

== Population and economy ==
Ijero Ekiti has a population of 165,099, according to the 2006 population census. The Ijero people are agrarian society producing food crops such as yam, cocoyam, cassava, pepper, tomatoes, and banana.

Ijero Ekiti has the presence of both federal and state in the town such as schools (primary and secondary), Federal Road Safety Corps and Primary Health Care, etc.

== Climate condition ==
March is Ijero-Ekiti's hottest month of the year, with an average temperature of 32 °C (89 °F) and a low of 22 °C (71 °F). The cool season goes on for 3.9 months, from June 17 to October 13, with a typical everyday high temperature underneath 28 °C (82 °F). The coldest month of the year in Ijero-Ekiti is August, with a typical low of 20 °C (68 °F) and high of 27 °C (80 °F).

The state generally has two distinct seasons thanks to its tropical climate. These are the blustery season (April–October) and the dry season (November–March). Temperature ranges somewhere in the range of 21 and 28 °C (70 and 82 °F) high.

=== Simulated historical climate & weather data for Ijero-Ekiti ===
The "mean day to day greatest" (strong red line) shows the most extreme temperature of a typical day for each month for Ijero-Ekiti. Similarly, the average minimum temperature is depicted by the "mean daily minimum" (solid blue line). Hot days and cold evenings (ran red and blue lines) show the normal of the most smoking day and coldest evening of every long stretch of the most recent 30 years. When planning your vacation, you can anticipate the average temperatures and be ready for warmer and colder days.
