= Ekiti West =

- LGA
- Interactive map of Ekiti West
- Country: Nigeria
- State: Ekiti State
- Capital: Aramoko

Area
  - Total: 366 km^{2} (141 sq mi)

Population (2006)
  - Total: 179,892
  - Density: 492/km^{2} (1,270/sq mi)
- Time zone: UTC+1 (WAT)
- Postal code: 362

Ekiti West is a Local Government Area of Ekiti State, Nigeria. Its headquarters is in the town of Aramoko.

It has an area of 366 km^{2} and a population of 179,892 at the 2006 census.

The postal code of the area is 362.

The Ekiti west LGA is home to a sizable Yoruba-speaking population, and Christianity is a widely practiced religion there.

== Economy ==
The Ekiti west LGA is primarily an agricultural area, where crops like cocoa, plantains, and pepper are cultivated. With the several markets in the LGA serving as platforms for the buying and selling of a wide range of commodities, the area also boasts a thriving trading sector. Blacksmithing, tetile weaving, and dyeing are some of the other significant economic activities in the Ekiti west LGA.

== Geography/Climate ==
There are two different seasons in the tropical climate that the State enjoys. These are the dry season — November to March — and the wet season — April to October. High humidity and temperature range from 21 to 28 degrees Celsius or 69 to 82 degrees Fahrenheit. The rainy and dry (Harmattan) seasons are characterized by the blowing of the south-westerly and north-easterly trade winds, respectively.

== Localities ==
Town and Villages under Ekiti West:

- Ido Ajinare (now Ido Ile)
- Ikogosi
- Ipole Iloro
- Aramoko
- Erinijiyan
- Okemesi
- Isokowa
- Egede
- Orokuta
- Osemo
- Kajola
