= List of Nigerians =

This is a list of notable Nigerian people. It includes some but not all notable Nigerians.

== Administrators and civil servants ==
- Charles Abani – resident coordinator of the United Nations
- Yarima Ibrahim Abdullahi – Nigerian administrator, served as the Nigerian high commissioner to Malaysia and Brunei
- Sarki Auwalu – director general of the Department of Petroleum Resources
- Adamu Abdu-Kafarati – former chief judge of the Federal High Court of Nigeria
- Suleiman Kassim – aviation secretary for the Ministry of Transportation
- Bamidele Solomon – former director general and CEO of NABDA

== Politicians ==
=== A–M ===
- Abba Kyari – late chief of staff to President Muhammadu Buhari
- Abdulkadir Kure
- Abdullahi Aliyu Sumaila
- AbdulRahman AbdulRazaq
- Abdulsalami Abubakar
- Abiola Ajimobi
- Abubakar Momoh
- Abubakar Tafawa Balewa – prime minister of Nigeria
- Adebayo Alao-Akala
- Adedeji Adeleke
- Adelere Adeyemi Oriolowo
- Adebayo Adepoju
- Adebayo Alao-Akala
- Adebayo Johnson Bankole
- Adeoye Aribasoye
- Adewale Egbedun
- Adolphus Wabara
- Ahmadu Bello
- Ahmed Marafa
- Ahmed Musa Dangiwa
- Ajibola Basiru
- Akanu Ibiam
- Akinwunmi Ambode
- Akinwumi Adesina
- Alex Ekwueme
- Alaba Omolaye-Ajileye - Nigerian jurist
- Alhaji Idi Farouk
- Ali Isa
- Aliyu Sabi Abdullahi
- Alvan Ikoku
- Aminu Tambuwal
- Anamero Sunday Dekeri
- Anyim Pius Anyim
- Atiku Abubakar
- Augustine Ukattah
- Ayo Fayose
- Azuka Okwuosa
- Babajide Sanwo-Olu
- Babajimi Adegoke Benson
- Babalola Borishade
- Babatunde Fashola
- Benjamin Anyene
- Benjamin Kalu
- Bisayo Busari-Akinnadeju
- Blessing Agbebaku
- Bola Tinubu
- Patrick Ekpotu
- Bonaventure Enemali
- Bukola Saraki
- Bunmi Dipo Salami
- Busari Adelakun
- Bashir Abubakar
- Chike Obi
- Chimaroke Nnamani
- Chris Ekiyor
- Christopher Okojie
- Christopher Pere Ajuwa
- Chuba Okadigbo
- Chukwuemeka Odumegwu Ojukwu
- Cornelius Adebayo
- Dele Belgore
- Dangiwa Umar
- Dapo Folorunsho Asaju
- Dipo Dina
- David Umahi
- David Dafinone
- David Edevbie
- David Mark
- Dennis Osadebay
- Desmond Elliot
- Dimeji Bankole
- Dora Akunyili
- Edwin Clark
- Effiong Okon Eyo
- Emem Usoro
- Emomotimi Agama
- Ernest Shonekan
- Evan Enwerem
- Elvert Ayambem
- Enitan Badru
- Fadjimata Maman Dioula Sidibé
- Fela Kuti
- Festus Okotie-Eboh
- Florence Ita Giwa
- Franca Afegbua
- Gbenga Daniel
- Ghali Umar Na'Abba
- Godwin Obaseki
- Goodluck Jonathan
- Gordian Ezekwe
- Hadiza Bala Usman
- Hadiza Seyni Zarmakoye
- Hajiya Nàja'atu Mohammed
- Herbert Macaulay
- Ibrahim Abdullahi Danbaba
- Ibrahim Babangida
- Ike Ekweremadu
- Imaan Sulaiman-Ibrahim
- Isa Mohammed Bagudu
- Issoufou Assoumane
- Iyorchia Ayu
- Jaja Wachuku
- Janet Akinrinade
- Jibrin Ndagi Baba
- Joe Acha
- John Bonzena
- Johnson Aguiyi-Ironsi
- Joseph Wayas
- Joy Emodi
- Julius Abure
- K. O. Mbadiwe
- Kande Balarabe
- Kayode Ajulo
- Kayode Fayemi
- Ken Erics
- Ladoke Akintola
- Lateef Adegbite
- Lola Abiola-Edewor
- Love Ezema
- Khalil Halilu
- Ken Nnamani
- Malik Ado-Ibrahim
- Margaret Ekpo
- Michael Ajegbo
- Michael Okpara
- Michael Opeyemi Bamidele
- Mohammed Bello-Koko
- Mohammed Barkindo
- Mohammed Hassan Abdullahi
- Mohammed Mustapha Namadi
- Moshood Abiola
- Muhammadu Buhari
- Murtala Muhammed
- Musa Babayo

=== N–Z ===
- Namadi Sambo
- Nasir Adhama
- Ngozi Okonjo-Iweala
- Nnamdi Azikiwe – first president of Nigeria
- Nwafor Orizu – Nigeria's second head of state (1965–1966)
- Nyesom Wike
- Obafemi Awolowo
- Ogbonnaya Onu
- Okechukwu Enelamah
- Oladipo Diya
- Oloye Akin Alabi
- Oludaisi Elemide
- Olusegun Obasanjo
- Olusola Saraki
- O. C. Adesina – professor of history at the University of Ibadan and Global Professor of History at the University of Manchester
- Owoidighe Ekpoatai
- Patricia Etteh
- Patrick Asadu
- Patrick Obahiagbon
- Paul Ururuka
- Peter Obi
- Peter Odili
- Philip Agbese
- Philip Effiong
- Philip Ikeazor
- Princess Pat Ajudua
- Remi Babalola
- Reno Omokri
- Richard Bamisile
- Rochas Okorocha
- Rotimi Amaechi
- Rukayya Dawayya
- S. A. Ajayi
- Saidu Musa Abdullahi
- Saleh Mamman
- Salihu Yakubu-Danladi
- Sam Obi
- Samuel Adesina
- Sani Abdullahi Shinkafi
- Sanusi Ado Bayero
- Segun "Aeroland" Adewale
- Shehu Shagari
- Shuaib Oba Abdulraheem
- Soji Adejumo
- Stephen Adewale
- Stephen Makoji Achema
- Sullivan Chime
- Tajudeen Adeyemi Adefisoye
- Tele Ikuru
- Timi Alaibe
- Tonto Dikeh
- Tony Ene Asuquo
- Tayo Alasoadura
- Temitope Aluko
- Tijani Adetoyese Olusi
- Tunde Eso
- Tunde Idiagbon
- Umaru Musa Yar'Adua
- Usman Mamman Durkwa
- Uzoma Emenike
- William Nwankwo Alo
- Wilson Sabiya
- Yahaya Madawaki
- Yakubu Gowon
- Yul Edochie
- Yusuf Datti Baba-Ahmed
- Zainab Abubakar Alman

== Military ==
- Adekunle Fajuyi
- Akinloye Akinyemi
- Alexander Ogomudia
- Aliyu Mohammed Gusau
- Alwali Kazir
- Benjamin Adekunle (Black scorpion)
- Buba Marwa
- C. Odumegwu Ojukwu
- Chris Alli
- Chukwuma Kaduna Nzeogwu
- Dangiwa Umar
- Halilu Akilu
- Hamza al-Mustapha
- Ibrahim Badamosi Babangida
- Idris Alkali
- Idris Garba
- Ike Nwachukwu
- Jamila Abubakar Sadiq Malafa
- John Nmadu Yisa-Doko – first indigenous chief of air staff
- Johnson Aguiyi-Ironsi
- Mamman Vatsa
- Martin Luther Agwai
- M. I. Wushishi
- M. Ndatsu Umaru
- Mohammed Sani Sami
- Muhammadu Buhari
- Muhammed Shuwa
- Murtala Mohammed
- Oladipo Diya
- Olusegun Obasanjo
- Owoye Andrew Azazi
- Paul Omu
- Salihu Ibrahim
- Sani Abacha
- Sani Bello
- Theophilus Danjuma
- Tunde Idiagbon
- Victor Malu
- Yahaya Abubakar
- Yakubu Gowon

== Media ==
- Ifeoma Aggrey-Fynn (died 2015) – radio and television personality
- Sam Amuka-Pemu – founder of the Vanguard newspaper, co-founder of The Punch
- Nicole Asinugo screenwriter and presenter
- Nenny B media personality
- Lekan Fatodu publisher of Checkout magazine
- Dul Johnson (born 1953) filmmaker and author
- Babatunde Jose (1925–2008) – journalist and newspaper editor; considered the "grandfather of Nigerian journalism"
- Farooq Kperogi – author, columnist, journalism professor at Kennesaw State University
- Dele Momodu – publisher, writer/journalist; entrepreneur, CEO of Ovation International magazine
- George Noah (born 1957) – journalist and former state official
- Benneth Nwankwo (born 1995) – photographer, film director, talk show host
- Cornelia O'Dwyer – talk show host
- Femi Oke – journalist and television presenter; former CNN International television anchor
- Bobby Ologun – television personality in Japan and martial artist
- Adenike Oyetunde (born 1986) – Nigerian lawyer turned radio host and amputee advocate
- Tunde Rahman – journalist, editor, and media advisor to president of Nigeria
- Aisha Salaudeen (born 2017) – Nigerian journalist and feminist
- Ikechi Uko – publisher, Akwaaba African Travel Market, ATQnews.com; author; travel and tourism media consultant

== Educators ==
- Abubakar Surajo Imam
- Joseph Agbakoba – professor of practical philosophy
- Atinuke Olusola Adebanji – professor of statistics and public
- Claude Ake – professor of political economy
- Cletus Nzebunwa Aguwa – professor of clinical pharmacy
- Dennis Chima Ugwuegbu (born 1942) – professor of psychology
- Etannibi Alemika
- Emenike Ejiogu – professor of electrical and electronics engineering
- Jude Rabo – vice-chancellor of Federal University, Wukari
- Olutayo Charles Adesina (born 1964) – professor of History
- Tessy Okoli
- Kate Omenugha (born 1965) – educator and politician
- Thomas Adesanya Ige Grillo (1927–1998) – professor of anatomy

== Lawyers ==
- Kayode Ajulo
- Richard Ayodele Akintunde
- Shaibu Atadoga
- Segun Jegede
- Helen Ogunwumiju
- Christopher Sapara Williams (1855–1915) first indigenous Nigerian Lawyer

== Writers ==
- Chinua Achebe
- Chimamanda Ngozi Adichie
- Lesley Nneka Arimah
- Seinde Arogbofa
- Adaeze Atuegwu
- Ogaga Ifowodo
- Nnamani Grace Odi
- Wole Soyinka
- Mamman Jiya Vatsa

== Business people ==
- Sowemimo Abiodun – founder/CEO of CapitalMetriQ Swift Bank
- Taofik Adegbite – CEO of Marine Platforms
- Bolaji Akinboro Nigerian entrepreneur
- Daere Akobo
- Obi Asika
- Aliko Dangote
- Halima Dangote
- Theophilus Adebayo Doherty (1895–1974) Founding of the Nigerian Stock Exchange & the National Bank of Nigeria. Businessman, Politician & Lawyer.
- Alhaji Habu Adamu Jajere – former president of Independent Petroleum Marketers Association of Nigeria (IPMAN) and winner of the Dr. Kwame Nkurumah African Leadership Award in Ghana.
- Ben Murray-Bruce – politician and Chairman of Silverbird Group
- Johnel Nnamani — co-founder of Nnamani Music Group
- Mary Nzimiro (1898–1993) – businesswoman, politician and women's activist
- Louis Odumegwu Ojukwu (1909–1966) Nigerian business tycoon
- Segun Ogunsanya – CEO of Airtel Nigeria
- Femi Otedola – Nigerian businessman
- Candido Da Rocha (1860–1959) – Nigerian businessman
- Adaoha Ugo-Ngadi – Nigerian businesswoman
- Akintola Williams (1919–2023) First Nigerian to qualify as a chartered accountant. Founding of the Nigerian Stock Exchange.

== Religion ==
- Wande Abimbola – academician; Ifá priest
- Abubakar Gumi (1924–1992) – Islamic scholar
- Enoch Adeboye – pastor; general overseer, Redeemed Christian Church of God
- Sheikh Abu-Abdullah Adelabu – academician;
- Asi Archibong-Arikpo – president of the Presbyterian Women's Guild in Nigeria, 1975–1982
- Benson Idahosa – Charismatic Pentecostal preacher; founder, Church of God Mission International
- Bimbo Odukoya – pastor; televangelist; founder, Fountain of Life Church
- Chris Okotie
- Chris Oyakhilome – televangelist; founding president of Christ Embassy
- Blessed Cyprian Michael Iwene Tansi – beatified by Pope John Paul II
- David Obadiah Lot – pastor, Church of Christ
- Bishop David Oyedepo – preacher; writer; founder and presiding bishop, Winners' Chapel (also known as Living Faith Church Worldwide); chancellor, Covenant University
- Deborah Omale – pastor, Divine Hand of God Prophetic Ministry
- Dominic Ekandem
- Emmanuel Omale – founder, Divine Hand of God Prophetic Ministry
- Francis Arinze – Catholic cardinal
- John Onaiyekan – Catholic cardinal
- Ibrahim Zakzaky outspoken Shi'a leader
- Joseph Ayo Babalola – founder, Christ Apostolic Church
- Joshua Selman – apostle, founder, Eternity Network International ENI, Koinonia Global
- Matthew Ashimolowo – senior pastor, Kingsway International Christian Centre (London, England)
- Peter Akinola – Anglican emeritus primate, Church of Nigeria
- Samuel Ajayi Crowther
- Sheikh Dahiru Usman – Islamic scholar, Dariqat Tijjaniya Movement
- T. B. Joshua – Christian minister; televangelist and faith healer; founder, Synagogue, Church of All Nations; founder, Christian television station Emmanuel TV
- Taiwo Odukoya – senior pastor, The Fountain of Life Church
- William Kumuyi – pastor, televangelist; writer; founder and general superintendent, Deeper Life Bible Church
- Joshua Iyemifokhae pastor and author

== Human-rights activists ==
- Aminu Kano
- Ayodele Awojobi
- Beko Ransome-Kuti
- Bisi Adeleye-Fayemi
- Dele Giwa
- Fela Kuti
- Funke Abimbola
- Funmilayo Ransome-Kuti
- Gani Fawehinmi
- Kayode Ajulo
- Kiki Mordi
- Olikoye Ransome-Kuti
- Olisa Agbakoba
- Omoyele Sowore
- Segun Awosanya
- Sonny Okosun
- Festus Keyamo
- Ken Saro-Wiwa

== Bloggers ==
- Kemi Adetiba
- Uche Pedro

== International models ==
- Agbani Darego – winner, Miss World 2001
- Ibife Alufohai – winner, Miss Valentine International 2010 and founder of Miss Polo International
- Mary Timms – face of Next Generation Entertainment Awards 2017
- Nelson Enwerem – model, television personality and winner of Mr Nigeria 2018
- Oluchi Onweagba – winner, M-Net Face of Africa competition 1998
- Omowunmi Akinnifesi

== Science ==
=== Engineers ===
- Sulyman Age Abdulkareem – academic and chemical engineer
- Esther Titilayo Akinlabi – professor of mechanical engineering
- Sarki Auwalu – chemical engineer
- Ayodele Awojobi – polymath and mechanical engineer
- Olufemi Bamiro – professor of mechanical engineering
- Philip Emeagwali – 1989 Gordon Bell Prize winner
- Ozak Esu – electrical engineer
- Gordian Ezekwe – mechanical engineer notable for supervising the construction of the Biafran rocket during the Nigerian Civil War
- Akii Ibhadode – mechanical engineer
- Tele Ikuru – mechanical engineer
- Ekei Essien Oku – first Nigerian woman chief librarian
- Gbenga Sesan – Nigeria's first Information Technology Youth Ambassador
- Bamidele Solomon – Chemical engineer prominent in Nigeria's biotechnology industry
- Rhoda Gumus – professor of Chemical Engineering and National Electoral Commissioner of INEC

=== Mathematicians ===
- Chike Obi – mathematician

=== Medical practitioners ===
- Adeoye Lambo – psychiatrist
- Abayomi Ajayi – obstetrician
- Ameyo Adadevoh – credited with having restricted the spread of Ebola virus in Nigeria
- Bennet Omalu – forensic pathologist
- Eyitayo Lambo – health economist and technocrat
- Olufunmilayo Olopade – oncologist
- Olumbe Bassir – biochemist and nutritionist
- Philomena Obiageliuwa Uyanwah – obstetrician and gynecologist
- Uchenna Okoye – cosmetic dentist and media personality
- Ayibatonye Owei – obstetrician and gynecologist

=== Scientists ===
- Anthony Adegbulugbe – energy planning and management specialist
- Nenibarini Zabbey – environmental scientist and professor of Hydrobiology

== Aviators ==
- Adeola Ogunmola Showemimo
- Blessing Liman
- Chinyere Kalu
- Lola Odujinrin

== See also ==
- List of Nigerian Americans
- List of Nigerian Britons
