= Omale =

Name List

- Gender: Masculine
- Language: Idoma

Origin
- Language: Idoma
- Origin: Nigeria
- Meaning: "A renowned scribe"; "man of wisdom"
- Region of origin: North Central Nigeria

Omale is an Idoma masculine given name meaning "A renowned scribe" or "man of wisdom" and a surname of Nigerian origin.

== Notable people with the name ==
- Emmanuel Omale Nigerian charismatic pastor and televangelist.
- Deborah Omale (born 29 September 1981), Nigerian pastor and televangelist.
- Hassan Omale Nigerian politician
