= Hajiya =

Hajiya is a name. Notable people with this name include:

- Hajiya Haidzatu Ahmed (1966–2021), Nigerian traditional ruler
- Hajiya Ma'daki (1907– c. 1990), Nigerian noblewoman
- Hajiya Maryam Abacha (born 1947), first lady of Nigeria
- Hajiya Nàja'atu Mohammed (born 1956), Nigerian politician
- Hajiya Sa'adatu Ahmad (1948–2013), Hausa singer
- Hajiya Zainab Maina (born 1948), Minister of Women Affairs and Social Development of Nigeria
