= Pelumi =

Yoruba name

- Gender: Unisex
- Language(s): Yoruba

Origin
- Word/name: Nigeria
- Meaning: with me

listen

Pelumi is a Yoruba name. It means "with me".

== Notable people ==
Pelumi Olajengbesi, Lawyer and human rights activist

Pelumi Onifade, Nigerian reporter
