= Bunmi =

Bunmi may refer to:

== Name ==
- Bunmi Banjo, technology leadership and future of work speaker and adviser
- Bunmi Dipo Salami (born 1967), Nigerian feminist
- Bunmi Kayode (born 1985), Nigerian footballer
- Bunmi Makinwa (born 1955), Chief Executive Officer of AUNIQUEI
- Bunmi Mojekwu (born 1989), English actress
- Bunmi Olatunji (born 1977), American psychologist
- Bunmi Rotimi (born 1995), American football player
