= Nigerian (disambiguation) =

Nigerian may refer to:

- Something of, from, or related to Nigeria, located in West Africa
  - Nigerians, people from Nigeria
  - Nigerian cuisine
  - There is no language called "Nigerian". For the most widely spoken languages in Nigeria, see Languages of Nigeria.

== See also ==
- Culture of Nigeria
- Demographics of Nigeria
- List of Nigerians
