= Sarki (name) =

Nigerian given name

- Gender: Male
- Language: Hausa/Yoruba

Origin
- Origin: Nigerian
- Meaning: king, ruler
- Region of origin: Northern, Nigeria

Sarki is a Nigerian name and surname of Hausa origin which means "king, ruler". Sarki is predominantly a masculine name, used for boys. Sarki in Yoruba is a form of greetings to hail a king, queen, prince or princess. Sarki holds cultural significance in Hausa and Yoruba communities, representing a legacy of kingship and historical importance.

== Notable people with the name ==
- Sarki Auwalu (born 1965), Nigerian chemical engineer.
- Emmanuel Sarki (born 1987), Nigerian professional footballer.
- Abdullahi Sarki Mukhtar (born 1949), Nigerian army general.
- Usman Sarki, CFR (1920 - 1984), Nigerian minister.
