= Adegbite =

Adégbìtẹ́ is both a surname and a given name of Yoruba (a language and culture in Nigeria) "Ade" translates to "crown" in Yoruba and "gbite" refer to "blessing". meaning "the crown or royalty receives a nest or throne". Notable people with the surname include:

- Damilola Adegbite (born 1985), Nigerian actress, model and television personality
- Lateef Adegbite (1933–2012), Nigerian lawyer and politician
- Razaq Adegbite (born 1992), Nigerian footballer
- Taofik Adegbite, Nigerian businessman
