= Alaba Omolaye-Ajileye =

- Education: University of Lagos (LL.B, 1984); Ph.D. in Law
- Occupations: Jurist, judge, academic
- Known for: Authority on electronic evidence in Nigeria

Alaba Omolaye-Ajileye is a Nigerian jurist, legal scholar, and authority on electronic evidence. He served as a Judge of the High Court of Kogi State from 2005 until his retirement in 2023. Following his judicial career, he transitioned into academia and is currently a visiting professor at the National Open University of Nigeria (NOUN), among other professional engagements.

== Early life and education ==
Omolaye-Ajileye studied law at the University of Lagos, where he obtained a Bachelor of Laws (LL.B) degree. He was called to the Nigerian Bar in 1984. He later obtained a Doctor of Philosophy (Ph.D.) in Law.

== Judicial career ==
In 2005, Omolaye-Ajileye was appointed a Judge of the High Court of Kogi State, a position he held until 15 February 2023. From 2008 until his retirement, he presided over corruption-related cases filed by the Economic and Financial Crimes Commission (EFCC) and the Independent Corrupt Practices and Other Related Offences Commission (ICPC) in Kogi State.

He also served as chairman and member of various election petition tribunals across Nigeria. His time on the bench was noted for integrity, impartiality, and commitment to judicial independence. Some observers described him as an "anti-government judge" due to his rulings that were occasionally contrary to government interests.

== Academic contributions ==
Omolaye-Ajileye is regarded as a leading expert in electronic evidence in Nigeria. He has authored several influential works, including:

- Electronic Evidence in Nigeria: The Journey So Far (2010)
- A Guide to Admissibility of Electronic Evidence (2016)
- Electronic Evidence (with Cybercrimes Act, 2018), Revised Edition (2019)
- A Compendium of Cases on Electronic Evidence (2020)

He has also written more than 80 academic and seminar papers, many of which have been presented at national and international conferences.

== Post-judicial career ==
After his retirement, Omolaye-Ajileye continued his involvement in academia and legal consultancy. He is a visiting professor at the National Open University of Nigeria (NOUN), a faculty member at the Digital Evidence & Cyber Forensic Institute, and has links with Baze University, Abuja.

He has served as a resource person for institutions including the National Judicial Institute (NJI).
