= Pelumi Olajengbesi =

Nigerian lawyer and rights activist

Pelumi Jacob Olajengbesi
- Born: 12 August 1986 (age 40)
- Education: LL.B; LL.M
- Alma mater: University of Abuja
- Occupation: Lawyer
- Known for: Advocacy

Pelumi Jacob Olajengbesi is an Abuja-based Nigerian lawyer and columnist. He is the current Convener of the Coalition of Public Interests Lawyers and Advocates (COPA) in Nigeria and also a Senior Partner at an Abuja-based law firm, Law Corridor.

== Early life ==
Born in Zaria, Kaduna State, Olajengbesi attended Manuwa Memorial Grammar School Iju Odo, and Holy Flocks of Christ Secondary School, Ondo State. He proceeded to College of Education in Ikere, Ekiti State where he earned National Certificate in Education before proceeding to the University of Abuja where he obtained a Bachelor's Degree in Law and served as the President of the Student Union Government. In 2016, he was called to the Nigerian Bar as a Barrister and Solicitor of the Supreme Court of the Federal Republic of Nigeria after completing his law school program in the Lagos Law School Campus, Nigeria. He co-founded LAW Corridor in 2017, where he continues his legal practice with focus on Public Interests law.

== Career ==
Olajengbesi began his legal career under the mentorship of renowned lawyer, Dr. Kayode Ajulo of Kayode Ajulo Castle of Law. In 2016, he founded a private practice, Pelumi Olajengbesi & Co., and later Co-founder Law Corridor and sits on the board and trusteeship of several civil society organizations. In 2018, he contested to represent Oriade/Obokun Federal Constituency at the House of Representatives under the Peoples' Democratic Party (PDP) before stepping down for the party's consensus candidate. He was also the candidate of the party at the State House of Assembly and remained active in the political scene as a public commentator and columnist. He is currently the Accord Party Candidate for Oriade/Obokun Federal constituency for 2027 House of Representatives election.

Pelumi Olajengbesi is known as a human rights activist. In 2021, he was counsel to the Yoruba Nation Activists and its Leader Chief Sunday Adeyemo (Sunday Igboho) against the Nigeria Department of State Services and secured the release of all activists arrested and detained by the Federal Government of Nigeria on their trial for terrorism. He also involved in several right issues including gender based violence and loan shark debts.
