= Fadjimata Maman Dioula Sidibé =

Minister of National Education
- In office April 2010 – 21 April 2011
- President: Salou Djibo
- Prime Minister: Mahamadou Danda
- Preceded by: Ousmane Samba Mamadou
- Succeeded by: Ali Mariama Elhadj Ibrahim
Diplomatic posts
Ambassador of Niger to Togo
In office
12 February 2014 – 1 February 2022
Ambassador of Niger to Cuba
In office
31 July 2013 – 12 February 2014
Ambassador of Niger to Canada
In office
15 February 2012 – 31 July 2013

Personal details
- Born: 23 October 1955 Bilma, Niger, French West Africa
- Education: Abdou Moumouni University
- Occupation: Diplomat; Politician; Educator
- Known for: Minister of National Education, Ambassador of Niger to Canada, Cuba, and Togo

Fadjimata Maman Dioula Sidibé (born October 23, 1955, in Bilma) is a Nigerien politician.

== Biography ==
Fadjimata Sidibé was born on October 23, 1955, in Bilma. She completed her secondary school diploma in Diffa and then studied at the Kassaï High School in Niamey, where she obtained a bachelor's degree in the C1 series. In 1976, she obtained a university diploma in scientific studies from Abdou-Moumouni University in Niamey. Later, at the same university, she earned a certificate in atomic and nuclear physics in 1979 and a bachelor's degree in physical sciences in the same year. From 1980 to 1982, she studied at the École Normale Supérieure in Bamako, where she obtained a master's degree in physical sciences. She then obtained her Certificate of Aptitude for Secondary Education Teaching at the National University of Benin in 1994.

From 1982 to 1986, she taught physics at a high school in Mali. From 1986 to 1992, she worked as a teaching assistant at the Franco-Arabic High School and the Kassaï High School in Niamey. From 1992 to 1994, she worked in Porto-Novo while pursuing her studies, and then became a physics teacher at Kassaï High School in 1996.

She became a specialized pedagogical inspector in physics, graduating in 2003. She worked in this capacity at Abdou-Moumouni University, then at the national level from 2003 to 2009, and as Director of Secondary and Middle School Education at the Ministry of Secondary and Higher Education from February 2009. She authored several high school textbooks.

In April 2010, she was appointed Minister of National Education and held that position until 21 April 2011.

On February 15, 2012, she was appointed Ambassador of Niger to Canada. She was still in office in January 2013.

On July 31, 2013, she was appointed Ambassador of Niger to Cuba.

On February 12, 2014, she was appointed Extraordinary and Plenipotentiary Ambassador of Niger to Togo. She left this position on February 1, 2022.
