= Zainab Abubakar Alman =

Nigerian politician (born 1965)

- Born: January 14, 1965 (age 61); Kaltungo, Gombe State, Nigeria
- Education: Kaduna Polytechnic
- Political party: All Progressives Congress (APC)

Zainab Abubakar Alman is a former member of Gombe State House of Assembly and the Director General, Women and Social Development (ARC-P), under the Muhammad Inuwa Yahaya administration.

== Early life and education ==
Alman was born on January 14, 1965, in Kaltungo Local Government, Gombe State. She attended Kaduna Polytechnic, where she obtained Ordinary National Diploma (OND) in Community Development in 1991.

== Career ==
Alman worked with the Gombe State Civil Service Commission as a Community Development Officer, Inspector, and Sectional Head between 1987 and 2000.

In 2000, she was an elected Councilor of Kaltungo Local Government Council. Between 2000 and 2007, she was elected as a member of Gombe State House of Assembly where she served as the Deputy Whip and Chairman of Women Affairs/Youth Development Committee.

In 2021, she was appointed as Director General, Women and Social Development (ARC-P) by governor Muhammad Inuwa Yahaya administration.

In March 2022, she was elected as the Zonal Women's leader for North East in the All Progressive Congress (APC) party.
