= Philomena Obiageliuwa Uyanwah =

Nigerian doctor (1938–2019)

- Born: March 28, 1938; Enugu
- Died: October 23, 2019 (aged 81); Baker Street
- Other names: Doctor Philomena
- Education: University of Aberdeen, Manchester University
- Occupation: doctor
- Known for: Chief Medical Officer for Biafra
- Children: a son

Philomena Obiageliuwa Uyanwah // known as Doctor Philomena (March 28, 1938 – October 23, 2019) was a Nigerian doctor who was Chief Medical Officer in Biafra during the civil war within Nigeria. She was a fellow of the Royal College of Obstetricians and Gynaecologists and an adviser to the World Health Organization.

== Life ==
Uyanwah was born in Enugu in 1938. Her parents were Martha Nnonye and Patrick Uyanwah. She was the only child of her parents to survive. She went to school in Nigeria before studying at the University of Aberdeen, graduating in 1964. In the late 1960s the civil war within Nigeria started with an area of Nigeria called Biafra trying to create their own country. The people of Biafra were primarily the Igbo people. The war ended in a siege and mass starvation. Uyanwah's sense of duty took her back to Nigeria and Biafra where she served as the Chief Medical Officer. She and her son were able to return to Scotland in 1969 thanks to a Red Cross Passport.

She gained her doctorate (MD) at the University of Manchester under Prof FA Langley.

In 1977 the University of Aberdeen published her work, The ABH Isoantigens in Cervical Malignancy. In 1978 she was meant to collect a doctorate from the University of Aberdeen but she was not able to do that.

She became a fellow of the Royal College of Obstetricians and Gynaecologists and an adviser to the World Health Organization on cervical cancer.

In 1992 she was working in Abu Dhabi. She also worked around this time at the King Faisal Military Hospital in Saudi Arabia, in Qatar, and finally in Muscat in Oman.

Uyanwah died at her home in Baker Street in London following a stroke over 23 years before at Sultan Qaboos Hospital Salalah in Oman. She was doing her ward rounds when it took place and she was sent back to the UK where she spent nine months in convalescence at the Royal Devonshire Hospital. After that, she was still unfit for work and she began 23 years of Independence at her home.
