= Hadiza Seyni Zarmakoye =

Nigerien politician

Member, Nigerien National Assembly
- Incumbent
- Assumed office 2020
- Constituency: Dosso Region

Personal details
- Party: ANDP
- Occupation: Politician

Hadiza Seyni Zarmakoye is a Nigerien politician, elected as a member of parliament of the Nigerien National Assembly following the legislative elections of 27 December 2020 in Niger. She is one of 50 female members of parliament of this legislature. She represents the Dosso Region and was elected on the list of the ANDP party. Hadiza Seyni is the second vice president of the national assembly. On 21 May 2021, she was elected as the honorary president of female parliamentarians in Niger.
