= Benjamin Anyene =

Nigerian doctor and politician (b. 1951, d. 2019)

Commissioner for Health Anambra State
- In office 2000–2003

Personal details
- Born: 8 June 1951 Eastern Region, Nigeria
- Died: 29 December 2019 (aged 68) New York (State), U.S.
- Spouse: Lady Ngozi Ayene
- Children: 4
- Occupation: Physician; microbiologist; politician; public health reformer

Benjamin Chukwudum Nnamdi Anyene (8 June 1951 – 29 December 2019) was a Nigerian physician, microbiologist, politician and public health reformer. He served as the Commissioner for Health in Anambra State from 2000 to 2003.

He was influential in ensuring that the Nigerian National Health Bill was signed into law and was at the forefront in demanding its full implementation.

== Personal life ==
Dr. Anyene was married to Lady Ngozi K. Anyene. They have four children.

== Positions and committees ==
Dr. Anyene was a health activist, reformer, visionary, and advocate for Nigeria's health sector. He was the Chairman of the National Immunization Financing Task Force Team (NIFT) and was the Chairman of the Health Sector Reform Coalition (HSRC).

He was a board member and Chairman Board Technical Committee, National Primary Health Care Development Agency between 2001 and 2015. He led the development and advocacy for the passage of the National Health Bill by the National Assembly and its executive assent by Former President Goodluck Jonathan in 2014.

Between 2008 and 2014, Dr. Anyene served as the National Policy/Immunization Advisor, a DFID and Norwegian Government program for Revitalizing Routine Immunization and Maternal Newborn and Child Health in Northern Nigeria.

He also served as the Vice Chairman of the White Ribbon Alliance Nigeria for Safe Motherhood, and was a member of the Nigeria Academy of Science Vaccines and Immunization Committee.

He fulfilled the duties of a member of the Iwuanyanwu committee that raised funds for Nigeria's first participation in the 1994 USA FIFA Football world cup tournament.
