= Love Ezema =

Nigerian politician

Politician

Love Ezema is a female Nigerian politician and public servant. She has served as Principal Secretary at Government House in Umuahia, Abia State Polytechnic (ASPOLY) doubled as the Social/Welfare Secretary, Alumni Association of the National Institute (AANI), and contested for the Nigerian House of Representatives seat for the Arochukwu/Ohafia Federal Constituency in the 2023 general elections, losing in the primaries.

Ezema holds positions on several Governing Boards in Abia State Polytechnic (ASPOLY), including at Gregory University, Uturu, (GUU) Abia State, the Institute Of Agricultural Research (IAR) in Zamaru, Zaria, and the Administrative Staff College of Nigeria, (ASCON) in Badagry, Lagos State.

She is a fellow of the Chartered Institute of Personnel Management in Nigeria and a member of the National Institute of Policy and Strategic Studies, Kuru in Jos.
