= Chris Ekiyor =

Nigerian dental surgeon

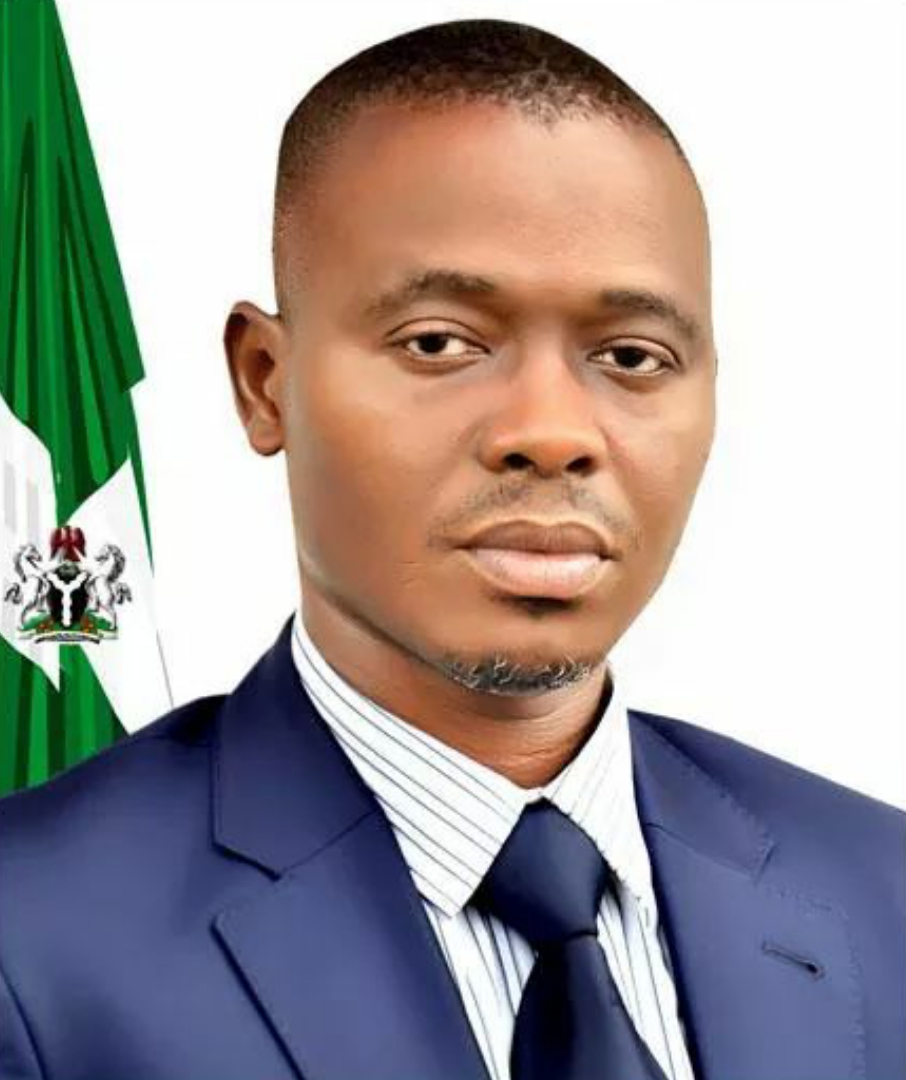
- Born: Chris; 17 March 1972 (age 54); Delta State, Nigeria
- Occupation: Dental surgeon
- Spouse: Gloria Ekiyor
- Children: 5

Chris Ekiyor (born 17 March 1972) is a Nigerian dental surgeon and the president emeritus of the Ijaw Youth Council. He is the founder of RAHI Medical Outreach.

== Early life and education ==
Ekiyor was born on 17 March 1972 in Delta State, Nigeria. He is a Dental Surgeon with an MBA, MPH and PhD. He lost his wife, Mrs. Gloria Ememerurai Ekiyor(nee Okagbare) in 2024. She was 42 years old and a mother of 5.

== Career ==
Ekiyor is the founder of RAHI Medical Outreach. It is a Non-Governmental Organization (NGO) that provides medical care for communities that have hospitals and a senator at Junior Chamber International (JCI) and the convener of the Integration Summit Group, Nigeria.

In 2008, Ekiyor was awarded a nonviolence stage 3 trainer, from the center for Nonviolence, University of Rhode Island, USA. He is also a recipient of the Nigerian Ambassador for Peace Award, BERN Switzerland. Youth Federation for World Peace Award (Geneva); Nonviolence Compliance Award from King-Lituli Transformation Centre, South Africa; and Social Recognition Award from the University of East London Alumni Association (2016).

== Boards and committees ==
Ekiyor is a member of the governing board of Delta State University Teaching Hospital Oghara and secretary, Delta State Government Advocacy Committee against Oil Facility Vandalism.

== Political career ==
He was the transition committee chairman, Patani Local Government Area, and also the past commissioner for commerce and industry, Delta State. He was the president of Ijaw Youth Council between 2007 and 2010.

In 2023, Dr. Ekiyor dumped the Peoples Democratic Party (PDP) and joined the All Progressives Congress (APC). It was said that Ekiyor moved to All Progressive Party with APC over 5000 of his followers across the State. In his speech, he stated, “Today I have decided to come back home with my followers from Patani, Bomadi, Burutu, Isoko South, Isoko North, Ughelli North, Ughelli South, Aniocha North, Warri South, Warri South-West ,Warri North Council Areas of the State to join the APC to take over the State in 2023 for a more Developed and better Delta State.”

In another development, Dr. Ekiyor enjoined the youths "to jointly adopt a political party and mobilize to produce the next President in 2023, all state governors, National Assembly and State Houses of Assembly, having made their point clear with the #EndSARS protests." At the primary election of the APC for the Bomadi/Patani Federal House of Representatives election ahead of the 2027 general elections, Dr. Ekiyor stepped down for Mr. Ganagana who polled 14,650 votes to win the election.

== Awards and honours ==
Ekiyor was honored by The Association of Resident Doctors, Delta State University Teaching Hospital, DELSUTH, Oghara for his outstanding contributions at the 11th Scientific Conference of the association. He was the guest speaker at the event, and spoke on the topic, "Political Will: A pivotal knot in quality Health care delivery."

== Publications ==
Haematological Parameters of Albino Rats Exposed to Lead Metal: Alleviating Effect of Cocos nucifera l. Water and Pisum sativum Extract.

Malaria care-seeking behaviour among HIV-infected patients receiving antiretroviral treatment in South-Eastern Nigeria: A cross-sectional study.

SOCIAL STRUCTURE AND SOCIAL JUSTICE AS BASIS FOR DEVELOPMENT IN NIGERIA. A paper presented at the INTERNATIONAL CONFERENCE ON INNOVATIVE RESEARCH AND SUSTAINABLE DEVELOPMENT CONFERENCE with the THEME: The African Economy and Sustainable Development: Issues, Challenges and Strategies.
