= Tunde Rahman =

Tunde Sarafadeen Rahman
- Education: MBA, Leicester University School of Business (2022); M.Sc. Communication Studies, Lagos State University
- Occupations: Journalist, editor, media advisor
- Years active: 1989–present
- Employer: Presidency of Nigeria
- Organizations: Nigeria Union of Journalists (NUJ); Investigative Reporters and Editors, USA; Nigeria Guild of Editors
- Known for: Senior Special Assistant to the President (Media)
- Title: Senior Special Assistant, Media
- Term: 2023–present

Tunde Sarafadeen Rahman is a Nigerian journalist, editor, and media advisor. He has worked for several major Nigerian newspapers, including Punch, THISDAY, and Daily Times. He later served as a media advisor to Asiwaju Bola Tinubu (2016–2023) in Lagos and as a presidential media aide from June 2023 in Abuja.

== Early life and education ==
He completed an MBA at the Leicester University School of Business, Leicester, United Kingdom, in 2022. He also has a master’s degree in communication studies from Lagos State University (LASU) School of Communication, Ojuelegba Campus, Lagos.

== Career ==
=== Journalism career ===
He was the managing editor/founder of Western Post Newspaper (2014 – 2016), editor THISDAY Newspaper (November 2004 – May 2014), Group News Editor of Punch Nigeria Limited, Ikeja (May 2000 – November 2004), Political Editor and Political Correspondent 0f Daily Times of Nigeria (1991 – 2000), Nigerian Correspondent, Tehran Times International (1990 – 1991) Political Correspondent, Lagos Horizon Newspaper (1989 – 1990 ). He is a member of the Nigeria Union of Journalists (NUJ), Investigative Reporters and Editors Incorporated, USA., and the Nigeria Guild of Editors.

=== Government appointments ===
- Media advisor to Asiwaju Bola Tinubu (2016-2023) in Lagos
- Senior Special Assistant to Media to the President from June 2023 in Abuja.
