= Yarima Ibrahim Abdullahi =

Nigerian administrator

Yarima Ibrahim Abdullahi (born 1 October 1939) is a Nigerian administrator, banker and former minister for Housing, as well as Education and Works. He is a graduate of Manchester University, Britain. He has also served as the Nigerian High Commissioner to Malaysia and Brunei.

== Early life and education ==
Yarima Ibrahim was born on 1 October 1939, in Gombe state. He had his primary education at the Hassan Central Primary School, Gombe.
