= Adaoha Ugo-Ngadi =

Nigerian businessperson

- Born: Adaoha Ugo-Ngadi; Nigeria
- Other name: Ada Ugo-Ngadi
- Occupations: Former Managing Director of Ontario Oil & Gas Nigeria Limited
- Known for: Alleged to have obtained N1,959,377,542.63 from the Petroleum Support Fund for a purported importation of 39.2 million litres of Premium Motor Spirit.
- Status: Discharged and Acquitted

Adaoha Ugo-Ngadi // (also known as Ada Udo-Ngadi) is the Nigerian managing director of Ontario Oil & Gas Nigeria Limited. She was a former employee of First Bank of Nigeria and Access Bank plc.

== Subsidy fraud ==
Udo-Ngadi was arraigned at the Ikeja High Court on 1 August 2013 alongside Walter Wagbatsoma, Mr. Babafemi Fakuade and their company Ontario Oil and Gas Limited by the Economic and Financial Crimes Commission. Adaoha Ugo-Ngadi, Walter Wagbatsoma, Fakuade Babafemi Ebenezer and Ontario Oil and Gas Nigeria Limited were alleged to have fraudulently obtained the sum of N1,959,377,542.63 from the Petroleum Support Fund for a purported importation of 39.2 million litres of Premium Motor Spirit.

According to the prosecution, the defendants defrauded the Federal Government of Nigeria of N340 million in the third quarter of 2010 and N414 million in the fourth quarter of 2010 and did not remit an excess of N754 million.

The conviction of Mrs. Ugo-Ngadi is arguably wrong. Justice Okunnu convicted Mrs Ugo-Ngadi on the basis that she is the Managing Director of Ontario Oil and Gas Ltd, and therefore, she is the 'operating mind' and alter ego of the company. The Judge found that "The transactions were with respect to what has been described as the Third Quarter and Fourth Quarter 'allocations' of that year, the year 2010, under the said Petroleum Support Fund (PSF) scheme". However, there was no evidence to show that Mrs. Ugo-Ngadi was the managing director ('operating mind' and alter ego) of Ontario and Gas Ltd at the relevant time in 2010. It was reported that one Mr. Bawo Etikeretse was the Managing Director ('the operating mind' and alter ego) of Ontario Oil and Gas Ltd in the Third Quarter [July] of 2010 and Fourth Quarter [November] of 2010. Mrs. Ugo-Ngadi became the Executive Director of Ontario and Gas Ltd in December 2010 after the transaction has been completed. The News Newspaper reported Mr Etikeretse as saying that "as at 13th of December 2010 when Ugo-Ngadi Adaoha was appointed Executive Director Finance and Strategy, and Walter Wagbatsoma was Executive Vice Chairman, he [Mr. Bawo Etikeretse] was the managing Director of the company [Ontario Oil and Gas Ltd]".

== Court sentencing ==
Udo-Ngadi was, on Thursday, 26 January 2017, sentenced to 10 years in prison by a Lagos-based High Court sitting in Ikeja for fuel subsidy fraud alongside the chairman of Ontario Oil & Gas Nigeria Limited, Walter Wagbatsoma. In addition to the jail sentence, Ngadi was ordered to refund N754 million to the Federal Government of Nigeria being the amount she defrauded. Justice Okunnu while reading the judgment noted that the convicts defrauded the Federal Government of Nigeria N754million in oil subsidy transactions totaling N1.9billion. Ugo-Ngadi filed an appeal at the Court of Appeal challenging her conviction and sentence.

== Acquittal ==
On February 8, 2018, an Appeal Court sitting in Lagos upturned the 10-year jail term passed on Udo-Ngadi. In the appeal marked CA/L/348C/17, and dated February 9, 2017, the appellant had urged the upper court to discharge her of the conviction on the ground that she cannot be sentenced in the absence of her co-accused.

Delivering lead judgment, Justice M. L. Garba ruled thus: “Upon reading the record of appeal and respective briefs of argument filed on behalf of both parties, It is ordered that for being a nullity the proceedings by High court, in the Court of Appeal trial of the appellant and others appellants in appeal CA/L/348c/17, and CA/L/389c/17, including the judgment delivered on January 13, 2017, convicting them of the offences they were tried for and the sentenced passed on them on January 26, 2017, in the absence of appellant in CA/L/348c/17, are hereby set aside. “That in consequence, the conviction and sentence of the appellant in the said judgment are quashed and the appellant discharged and acquitted accordingly”.

Other members of the panel which included Justice J. S. Ikjegh and Justice Y. Nimper agreed with the lead judgment.
