= Thomas Adesanya Ige Grillo =

Nigerian academic

Thomas Adesanya Ige Grillo (January 29, 1927 in Lagos, Nigeria – October 21, 1998), was a son of J. Aina Osaoba and V. Adenike Omolara (Serrano) Grill. He was the First professor of Anatomy in Nigeria.

== Education ==
He studied at Baptist Academy, Lagos and Hope Waddell Training Institution, Calabar for his primary and secondary Educations respectively. He continued his studies at City College Norforlk, England. He was then admitted to Royal College of Surgeons of Ireland, St. Stephen Green, Dublin, Ireland. He subsequently got his Master of Arts and Doctor of Philosophy, at St. John's College, Cambridge, England, 1960. Doctor of Science, Trinity College, Dublin, 1972. Doctor of Medicine, University College, Dublin, 1993.

== Career ==
Supervisor St. John's College, Cambridge, England, 1955-1960. Assistant professor Stanford University, California, 1960-1961. Professor University of Ibadan (Nigeria), 1966-1972. Professor, dean foundation University Ife (Nigeria), 1972-1990. Prf., principal College Medicine, Sierra Leone, 1988-1992. Fellow Churchill College, Cambridge, England, 1992-1994. Professor Emeritus Obafemi Awolowo University, Ile-Ife, Nigeria. Consultant Pathologist Ife University Teaching Hospital, Nigeria, 1975-1984. Consultant World Health Organization, Africa, 1973-1986

== Publications and articles ==
1. Book The Evolution of Pancreatic Islets (Proceedings of a Symposium held at Leningrad 1975)
2. Editor: Journal University Ibadan, 1962–1972
3. Evolution of the Pancreatic Islet, 1976.

== Membership ==
- Chieftain Bashegun of Ilesha (Nigeria), 1981.
- Fellow Science Association Nigeria (editor journal. 1966-1972)
- Nigerian Academy of Sciences (editor journal.1972-1985).
- Member Royal College Surgeons (Ireland, licensed, Visiting Professor 1995, French-O'Carroll Medal 1953)
- Royal College Physicians (licensed, Ireland),
- Anatomical Society Brittany and Ireland
- Endocrinology Society Nigeria (President), Oxford and Cambridge University Club.
