= Rhoda Gumus =

Nigerian Electoral Commissioner

- Born: July 21, 1953 (age 73); Koroama, Bayelsa State
- Citizenship: Nigerian
- Education: Rivers State University of Science and Technology (M.Sc.); Loughborough University (Ph.D.)
- Occupation: Electoral commissioner
- Years active: 2023-date
- Organization: National Electoral Commission
- Website: inecnigeria.org

Rhoda Gumus is a Nigerian professor of chemical engineering. She is a Commissioner of the Independent National Electoral Commission of Nigeria. She was appointed by President Muhammadu Buhari and confirmed by the Nigerian Senate on 2 February 2022.

== Education ==
Gumus was born on 21 July 1953 in Koroama town of Bayelsa State. She studied for a Higher National Diploma from the College of Science and Technology, Rivers State and a Master of Technology in Chemical Engineering from the Rivers State University of Science and Technology. She further obtained a PhD in Chemical Engineering from Loughborough University, UK.

== Controversy ==
Gumus's appointment as a National Electoral commissioner by President Buhari became controversial in 2022 due to allegations that she was a member of the All Progressives Congress. A purported "party membership card" was widely reported and copiously reproduced by newspapers across Nigeria as belonging to Gumus. The main opposition party in Nigeria, the People's Democratic Party rejected her appointment and confirmation by the Senate. Citizens wrote several petitions against her nomination and the senate was criticised for not publicly addressing those petitions before her confirmation. Gumus denied membership of any political party. She threatened legal action against the Concerned Nigerians Group (CNG) a civil rights group and other news sources who had carried the news and demanded a retraction. The CNG however replied that they were willing to meet in court over the allegations.

During the Edo State Governorship election which took place on 21 September 2024, Gumus was reported as saying "I am in charge, I wont take bribes...nobody will try me". The election is keenly contested between All Progressives Congress, the People's Democratic Party and the Labour Party and Gumus' statement comes against the backdrop of perceptions that Nigeria's partisan elections are heavily influenced by corruption.
