= Asi Archibong-Arikpo =

Nigerian midwife and designer (1919–2005)

- Hon. Elder (Chief) Mrs. Asi Archibong-Arikpo
- Born: Asi Archibong; 12 November 1919; Calabar
- Died: 22 November 2005 (aged 86)
- Education: Dublin, Ireland
- Occupations: midwife, politician, and fashion designer
- Title: Hon. Elder
- Spouse: Okoi Arikpo
- Children: 1

Asi Archibong-Arikpo (12 November 1919 – 22 November 2005) was a Nigerian midwife, politician, and fashion designer.

== Early life ==
Asi Archibong was born in Calabar, the daughter of William Archibong Young and Umo Archibong Young, parents of the Efik ethnic group. She attended Duke Town Presbyterian School in Calabar, and trained in Dublin, Ireland as a midwife.

== Career ==
Archibong-Arikpo was the head of a maternity hospital in Ugep, Nigeria, for two years. Archibong-Arikpo also pursued a career in fashion design. In 1963, she said she was working on a national bridal dress for Nigeria. Her gowns were often blue and gold, colors she associated with the Presbyterian Church. She sold her dresses to raise funds for church mission activities.

In 1969, she was ordained as a ruling elder in the Presbyterian Church of Nigeria. In 1975, she was elected president of the Presbyterian Women's Guild in Nigeria, a role she filled until 1982. As a politician, she was elected to the Calabar Municipal Council in 1977, and served in the Cross River State legislature from 1979 to 1983.

She visited the United States with her husband in 1963 and spoke to reporters about her own work as an midwife and designer. She went to North America again in 1969, with her husband, who was addressing the United Nations.

For her lifetime of diverse achievements, she was honored with a chieftaincy in 1975, and named "National Grandmother" by the Christian Girls in Training in 1990.

== Personal life and death ==
Asi Archibong met Okoi Arikpo in London when he was a doctoral student; they married in London in 1950. They had a daughter, Itam. Asi Archibong-Arikpo was widowed when her husband died in 1995.

She died ten years later, at age 86.
