= Busari Adelakun =

Nigerian politician

Commissioner for Local Government and Chieftaincy Affairs, Oyo State
- In office 1979–1981
- Governor: Bola Ige

Commissioner for Health, Oyo State
- In office 1981–1983
- Governor: Bola Ige

Personal details
- Born: Ejioku, Ibadan, Oyo State, Nigeria
- Died: 1984 Lagos University Teaching Hospital, Lagos, Nigeria
- Occupation: Politician, farmer

Busari Adelakun was a Nigerian politician from Ejioku area of Ibadan, Oyo State. He was affiliated with the Action Group and Unity Party of Nigeria (UPN) during the First and Second Republic respectively. As a member of UPN and a later NPN in Ibadan during the second republic, Adelakun was an important figure in the turbulent politics of the city.

Adelakun's father was a cocoa farmer from Ibadan and he inherited his father's farm upon the death of the latter. When he began his first political activities, it was to represent his father during meetings of the Ibadan Peoples Party. From there Adelakun joined the Action Group, it was an arduous task for the party to gain support in Ibadan due to the popularity of a single man, Adegoke Adelabu, even after Adelabu's death AG did not gain much support in Ibadan and violence that sprung out after the death of Adelabu targeted many of the party's members. A schism in AG between the regional Premier, Akintola and former premier, Awolowo emerged in 1962. Adelakun sided the Awolowo faction. Thereafter, Adelakun's faction was weakened in Ibadan during a chaotic period in the Western region. After a military coup dissolved the democratic republic, Adelakun returned to farming and also joined a farmer's union, becoming its president.

In 1976, he won the local government elections in Ibadan after a few setbacks which included an initial disqualification. After he was initially disqualified from contesting the election, Adelakun's supporters boycotted the election, while he went to court to declare the election null and void. The court accepted his plea and after the new election was conducted, Adelakun was declared winner. In 1979, Adelakun teamed up with another party leader, Archdeacon Emmanuel Alayande to help UPN clinch majority of votes in Ibadan, it was one of the few times an Awolowo led party was able to win majority votes in the city. In 1979, he was appointed commissioner of local government in Oyo State, two years after, he was redeployed to the Health ministry.

In 1983, Adelakun joined a faction that was opposed to the candidacy of Bola Ige as UPN governor. Adelakun and another member of the faction, Sunday Afolabi later joined the opposition party, NPN.

Adelakun was jailed in 1984 by a new military regine headed by Major-General Muhammadu Buhari.

== Death ==
He died in 1984 at Lagos University Teaching Hospital as a result of ill health while still being imprisoned.
