= Suleiman Kassim =

Nigerian politician

Suleiman Khassim has served as an aviation secretary for the Ministry of Transportation in Nigeria.
