= Tijani Adetoyese Olusi =

Nigerian politician

Honorable Tijani Adetoyese Olusi
- In office July 25, 2017 – July 25, 2025
- Succeeded by: Prince Taiwo Ajibade Oyekan

Personal details
- Born: Tijani Adetoyese Oluyole Olusi; 29 October 1969 (age 56) Lagos Island, Lagos State, Nigeria
- Party: All Progressives Congress
- Spouse: Ameenat Olusi

Tijani Adetoyese Olusi is a Nigerian politician and former Executive Chairman of Lagos Island Local Government. He served as chairman from July 2017 until July 2025 under the platform of the All Progressives Congress (APC).

Before becoming chairman, Olusi was the Executive Secretary of Lagos Island Local Government from January 10, 2015 to June 6, 2016, and earlier served as Vice-Chairman/Supervisor for Education between 2008 and 2014.

In the July 2017 local government elections, he contested for the office of Chairman on the APC platform and won with a margin of over 13,000 votes, succeeding Hon. Wasiu Eshinlokun Sanni, whose tenure ended in 2014. His victory came after internal party debates, as there was reported rivalry with his brother, Adesola Olusi, over who should contest that year.

Olusi’s tenure as chairman ended in July 2025.

== Early and personal life ==
Tijani Adetoyese Olusi is of Yoruba origin from Oke-Arin, Lagos Island. He is of the royal family of Alhaji Tajudeen Oluyole Olusi and Alhaja Iyabo Olusi as the first child of the family. He is a Prince and the grandson of Oba Sanusi Olusi (The Late Eleko).

He attended Kuramo Primary School, Victoria Island and Government College, Victoria Island for his secondary school education. Adetoyese later proceeded to Kwara state polytechnic for his OND and HND degrees in Banking and Finance. He obtained a certification in Cooperate Administration from the Nigeria Institute of Corporate Administration (NICA).

Olusi had his first working experience as a Nigerian youth corper where he served as an administrative trainee officer at Federal Ministry of Internal Affairs in Oyo state. After his National Youth Service Corps (NYSC), he went ahead to work for Lagos State Building Investment & Co. (LBIC) as their Supervisor/Banking Officer. Adetoyese also worked with Inland Bank Nigeria Plc. as a Supervisor/Clearing Officer.

He is married with three children.

== Political career ==
Olusi's political career began when he was appointed as Public-Private Partnership (P.P.P) ward party Chairman Ward A3. He got other appointments as the Assistant Secretary (A.D) and L.G.A Ex Officio (A.C.N) Lagos State Chapter.

Olusi also served in Lagos Island Local Government in various capacities, including:

- Supervisor for health under Mrs Aderinola Disu Administration.
- Vice Chairman/ Supervisor for Education under Wasiu Eshinlokun Sanni (2008 -2014).
- Executive Secretary from 2015 to 2016.
- Executive Chairman from 2017
