= National Judicial Institute =

Training and evaluation institution

The National Judicial Institute (NJI) is the institution in charge of training and evaluation of judicial officers in Nigeria.

Official website for the National Judicial Institute Nigeria is nji.gov.ng

== Establishment ==
The National Judicial Institute Act (1991 No. 28. Section 2), states the functions of the National Judicial Institute as thus:

- "conduct courses for all categories of judicial officers and their supporting staff with a view to expanding and improving their overall knowledge and performance in their different sections of service;"
- "provide continuing education for all categories of judicial officers by undertaking, organizing, conducting and facilitating study courses, lectures, seminars, workshops, conferences and other programmes related to judicial education."
