= George Noah =

Nigerian journalist

George Kayode Noah
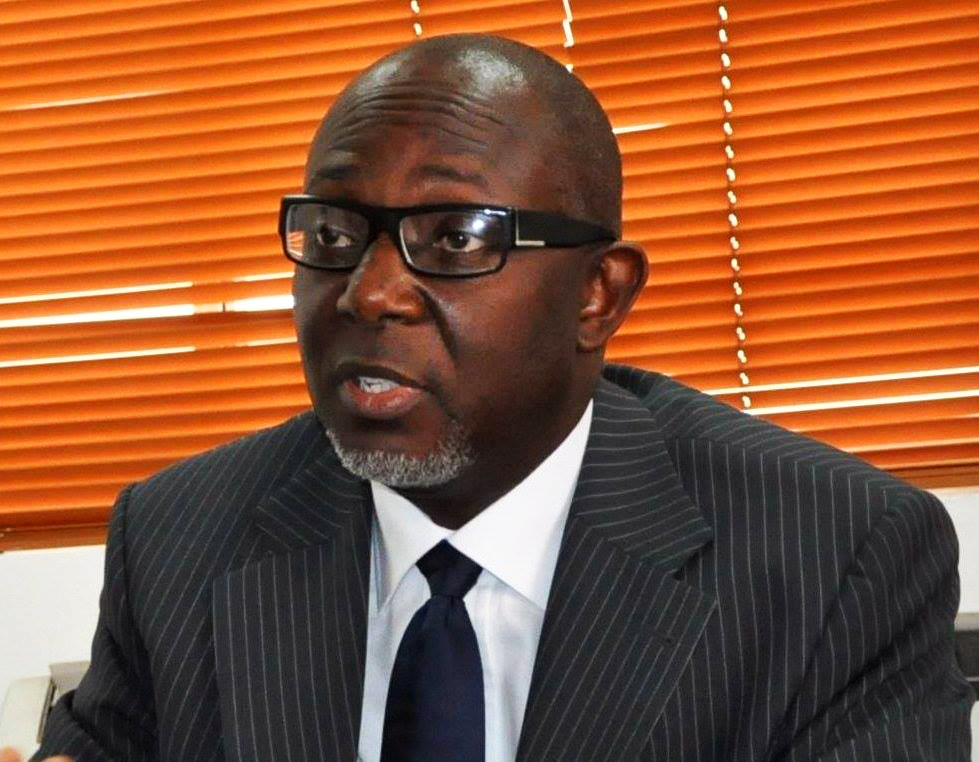

Former Managing Director, Lagos State Signage & Advertisement Agency
- In office 2011–2015
- Preceded by: Tunji Bello
- Succeeded by: Mobolaji Sanusi

Personal details
- Born: 1957 (age 68–69) Lagos, Nigeria
- Education: University of Ibadan
- Profession: Media consultant
- Website: http://georgekayodenoah.com/

George Kayode Noah (born October 1957) is a Nigerian journalist and former state official. Noah served as the managing director of the Lagos State Signage & Advertisement Agency between 2011 and 2015. This agency, part of the Lagos State Government, is responsible for regulating and controlling outdoor advertising and signage displays in the state.

== Political activism ==
Noah was elected House Secretary of the University of Ibadan Students Union in 1979, in a landslide victory.

He was a founding member of Radio Kudirat (named after Kudirat Abiola), an anti-military rule radio station that was based in Norway. It was done under the auspices of Media Empowerment for Africa. Radio Kudirat was backed by the American, British, Swedish, Danish, and Norwegian governments in their quest to end the brutal military dictatorship in Nigeria.

Some of the founding members were Chief Anthony Enahoro, Professor Wole Soyinka, Asiwaju Bola Tinubu, Kayode Fayemi, Dr. Olaokun Soyinka, Ilemakin Soyinka, Hon. Olawale Osun, Lemi Gbolahan and Richmond Dayo Johnson. The radio station had contributors that included Senator Tokunbo Afikuyomi, Professor Gbadegesin, Professor Bolaji Aluko, Senator Sola Adeyeye, former Edo State Governor John Odigie Oyegun and his then deputy and Rev. Peter Obadan. Radio Kudirat was in operation for three years between 1996 and 1999.

== Career ==
Noah later moved to the UK. In 1984, he joined the Greater London Council as a public relations officer.

In August 2011, Lagos State Governor Babatunde Fashola nominated him as the managing director of the Lagos State Signage and Advertisement Agency (LASAA), a position he held from 2011 to 2015.

During Noah's tenure at LASAA, it became the first institution in the country to introduce Skype as a customer service platform, implementing Africa's first water projection advertising in Lagos, as well as part of the implementation of directional street signs and the house numbering project. LASAA also hosted three editions of the Lagos Countdown.

Noah has served on the Lagos Economic Summit, (Ehingbeti) the state’s Revenue Think Tank and the committee for the regeneration of Ijora Badiya and Obalende, Lagos.

== Awards ==
In June 2014, he was awarded the honorary title "Lagos State Man of the Year".
