= Idi Farouk =

Nigerian politician (born 1949)

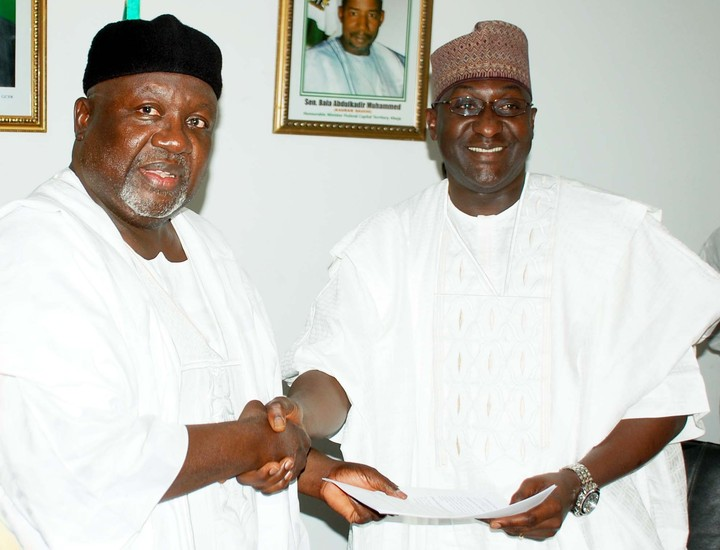
- Born: 14 March 1949 (age 77)
- Education: C.M.S, Lagos
- Occupation: Politician
- Organization: National Orientation Agency (NOA)

Idi Farouk (born 14 March 1949) is a Nigerian politician and former Director-General of National Orientation Agency (NOA).

== Background and education ==
Idi Farouk was born in Kano in early 1949. He is native of Dako Kaduna North Local Government Area of Kaduna State. Farouk received his early education at CMS Primary School from 1955 to 1961 before enrolling at St. Paul's College Wusasa, Zaria for his secondary education.

== Career ==
After his secondary education, Farouk was employed at BP Supergas as a district Clerk and later transferred his service to Kingsway Stores Kaduna as a clerk and storekeeper. In 1958, he enlisted in the Nigerian Air Force as an airman and remained in the service until 1974 when left the service and joined News-Lab Advertising Agency and Public Relations Consultant as a director.

== Political appointment ==
Farouk was appointed Permanent Secretary Liaison by the Kaduna State Government in 1983. He served until 1986 when he was appointed Chairman/Administrator of Kaduna Local Government Council, a position he held for a year (1986–1987) before being appointed Permanent Secretary in the Ministry of Information, Kaduna State.

Farouk served as the chairman of the Kaduna State Constitutional Conference Forum in 1994, where he drafted the constitution for the Northern Emirs and Chiefs. He was appointed commissioner for information in Kaduna State in 1994. In 1999, Farouk was appointed chief of staff to the governor of Kaduna State. Farouk served in this position until 2003 when he was appointed director general of the National Orientation Agency; concurrently, he as a member of the Joint Intelligence Board, office of the National Security Adviser. Farouk was Deputy Director-General, Obasanjo/Atiku Presidential Campaign Organization for their 2003 re-election campaign. In 2015, he chaired the Kaduna State APC Governorship Campaign Council. Farouk serves as Chairman Board of Directors of New Telegram Newspapers.
