= Chike Obi =

Nigerian politician and mathematician

- Born: April 17, 1921; Anambra State, Nigeria
- Died: March 13, 2008 (aged 86)
- Citizenship: Nigerian
- Occupation: Mathematician
- Spouse: Belinda (w. 2009)
- Children: 4
- Writing career
- Notable awards: Sigvard Eklund Prize

Chike Obi // (April 17, 1921 – March 13, 2008) was a Nigerian politician, mathematician and professor.

Chike Obi was the first Nigerian to hold a doctorate degree in mathematics. Obi's early research dealt mainly with the question of the existence of periodic solutions of non-linear ordinary differential equations. He successfully used the perturbation technique, and several of his publications greatly helped to stimulate research interest in this subject throughout the world and have become classics in the literature.

Obi is the author of several books and journals on mathematics and Nigerian politics.

== Early life and education ==
Obi was educated in various parts of Nigeria before reading mathematics as an external student of the University of London. Immediately after his first degree, he won a scholarship to do research study at Pembroke College, Cambridge, followed by doctoral studies at Massachusetts Institute of Technology.in Cambridge, Massachusetts, United States, becoming in 1950, the first Nigerian to receive a PhD in mathematics.

== Career as mathematician ==
Obi returned to lecture at the premier Nigerian University of Ibadan. He was soon diverted from this by political activities. After the war, he returned to lecture in 1970 at the University of Lagos where he quickly rose to the senior academic role of a professor.

He left Lagos to return to his root in the city of Onitsha, establishing the Nanna Institute for Scientific Studies.

Obi had won the Sigvard Eklund Prize for original work in differential equation from the International Centre for Theoretical Physics. He was a university teacher until his retirement as an Emeritus Professor in 1985.

In 1997, Obi claimed to be the third person to solve Fermat’s Last Theorem after Andrew Wiles and Richard Taylor in 1994. He also claimed to have found an elementary proof to Fermat’s Last Theorem. This work was carried out at his Nanna Institute for Scientific Studies in Onitsha, Eastern Nigeria and published in Algebras, Groups and Geometries. However, a review of this proof published in Mathematical Reviews indicates that it was a false proof.

== Career in politics and activism ==
In Ibadan, Obi began to give lectures about his political philosophy, Kemalism and how best he felt the country should be managed. He helped form the Dynamic Party of Nigeria, of which he served as its first secretary-general. Through the party, he stood in as a candidate in a parliamentary election in Ibadan in 1951 but lost.

The party later entered into alliances with the larger National Council of Nigerian and Cameroon and also the Action Group. Obi was elected as part of the Nigerian delegation that negotiated the country’s path to self-rule at two London conferences in 1957 and 1958.

After Nigeria's independence from Britain in 1960, Obi was elected a legislator in the Eastern House of Assembly in 1960, he refused to vacate his seat in the national legislature in Lagos, the Speaker of the regional house ordered that Obi be physically removed by security agents. This order was obeyed and Obi decided to commit himself to regional affairs.

In 1962, Obi was arrested and charged with treason in a closed trial organized by the then national civilian government, who accused him and others, including the main opposition leader at the time, Obafemi Awolowo, of plotting to overthrow the government. He was later released for "want of evidence."

When the Nigerian Civil War broke out in 1967, Obi sided with Biafra, working for the rebel leader Chukwuemeka Odumegwu Ojukwu. For a brief period in the 1970s when he served in the National Revenue Mobilization Commission.

Obi derided religion and ethnic extremism, and the culture of corruption pervading the Nigerian political class. He was a national newspaper columnist in the 1980s, writing under the title, "I speak For the People."

== Awards ==
A visiting professor to the University of Rhode Island, USA, the University of Jos, Nigeria, and the Chinese Academy of Sciences, Obi was a recipient of the national honour of Commander of the Order of the Niger (CON) and a Fellow of the Nigerian Academy of Science.

== Personal life ==
When Obi died in 2008, he was survived by his wife until 2010. Obi's wife Belinda died in early 2010 a nurse and they are survived by their four children.
