= Dul Johnson =

Nigerian filmmaker and author (born 1953)

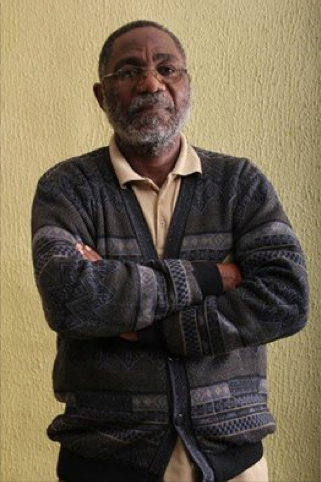
- Dul, September 2014
- Born: September 16, 1953 (age 72); Zamlaka, Nigeria
- Occupations: Filmmaker; Author

Dul Johnson (born September 16, 1953) is a Nigerian filmmaker and author. He began his career as a drama director with the Nigerian Television Authority, Jos, and worked for many years before retiring into independent filmmaking and teaching. His best-known films include There is Nothing Wrong with my Uncle (a cultural documentary), The Widow's Might (a feature film), Against the Grain, Wasting for the West, and Basket of Water.

== Early life and education ==
Johnson was born in 1953 in the small village of Zamlaka in the present-day Langtang North Local Government Area of Plateau State. He was born into a polygamous family, the fourth of Kongdak's 10 children. The family moved when Johnson was five years old from Zamlaka in the north to Gina in the south of Langtang, where he learned shepherding and blacksmithing. However, Johnson moved back to the north to attend primary school from 1961 to 1965. He was returned home in 1965 due to sickness, missing one academic year.

When he returned to school in 1967, his father sent him to his maternal grandmother at the foot of the mountains at Timwat, a period of his life Johnson later described in his short story, "Living with Shadows".

Johnson was inspired to start writing about his own life while in Form Two of secondary school, when he read The African Child by Camara Laye, who like Johnson was the son of a blacksmith, and wrote of topics he could relate

to. In secondary school Johnson also began acting on the stage, participating in the production of one of Ngugi's early plays and Shakespeare’s The Merchant of Venice. This interest increased when he entered university, where he also began writing and directing stage plays.

== Career ==
In 2010, Johnson won a writing fellowship to Brown University in the United States, where he wrote most of his first novel, Deeper into the Night. At Brown, Johnson was able to meet notable writers including George Lamming, Chinua Achebe, John Edgar Wideman, Ama Ata Aidoo and the writer and director of the INP. He also staged a small Nigerian festival as part of which he contributed his works of fiction and a film in progress.

He later took a residency at Ebedi in Oyo State, Nigeria, visited Goa for the International Film Festival of India in 2012, and went to Edinburgh, Scotland, in 2013 where his film There is Nothing Wrong with my Uncle was in a festival.

== Works ==
Johnson has published five major works: Shadows and Ashes, Why Women Won't make it to Heaven (short story collections), Ugba Uye: The Living Legend (a biography), Deeper into the Night (a novel) and Melancholia (a play). The last two were presented to the public on 28 October 2014.

As well as writing plays, Johnson has also produced poetry, journalistic writing and short stories. In the 1970s he wrote plays for radio (Rima Radio, Sokoto) and for the stage, some of which were produced while he was an undergraduate. One of his productions received such a scathing review from one of his lecturers that he hid himself in his room for two days and refused to attend the lecturer's classes for a week. None of his early plays from this period survive. As a student, Johnson also wrote for the campus gossip magazine known as The Spark, working as a production manager.

== Legacy and honours ==
While working with the NTA, Johnson won several awards with his TV dramas. His independent movie The Widow's Might also won an award at the 2002 Pyongyang International Film Festival, while his documentary There is Nothing Wrong with my Uncle was nominated for best documentary at some international film festivals, including the 8th Africa Movie Academy Awards. Johnson was awarded the 2017 Association of Nigerian Authors prose fiction prize for his novel Across The Gulf. Melancholia was nominated for the 2018 Nigeria Prize for Literature.

Johnson holds a PhD in Literature, a certificate in Drama Direction from the BBC Training School, and a certificate in Advanced Drama Directing from the NTA Television College. He is a member of the Association of Nigerian Authors (ANA), Nigerian Popular Theatre Alliance (NPTA), and Independent Television Producers' Association of Nigeria (ITPAN), and sits on the Board of Trustees of the Motion Picture Practitioners' Association of Nigeria (MOPPAN).

== Filmography ==
- The Future: A documentary series on the activities of TETFUND
- There is Nothing Wrong With my Uncle; a feature Documentary Film on Tarok beliefs and ancestor worship, 2012. Was nominated for Best Documentary Award I AMAA 2012. Now being distributed by the Royal Anthropological Institute of Great Britain.
- The Commission: A Season's Serial Drama Production sponsored by the Code of Conduct Bureau, 2008. (Writer/Director)
- The Widow's Might: A 94-minute personal feature film on the problems of widows in our society – writer, producer and director. This film was given an international award at the Pyongyang Film Festival in 2002.
- Of Rocks and Jos: A documentary on the fascinating rock formations on the Jos Plateau; for the Nigerian Film Corporation, Jos, December ’99. (Writer, Producer/Director)
- For the Good of All: A half-hour celluloid documentary film on vision 2010; for the Nigerian Film Corporation, Jos, 1997. (Writer/Producer/Director)
- Basket of Water: An NTA Jos Drama entry for TELEFEST ’96. (Writer, Producer/Director)
- Painted Mirror: A commissioned half-hour television drama designed for mass literacy, for Dangana Educational Theatre, Minna, 1995. (Producer/Director)
- Wasting for the West: An NTA Jos Drama entry for TELEFEST ’93. (Producer/Director)
- Against the Grain: An NTA Jos Drama entry for TELEFEST ’92. (Producer/Director)
- Population Explosion: A half-hour special N.T.A Festival Production focusing on the dangers of lack of family planning. (Writer/Producer/Director)
- NIPSS: The Foundation Years: A Documentary on ten years of the National Institute for Policy and Strategic Studies, Kuru, and the strides the institute had taken in its ten years of existence (1979–89). (Producer/Director)
- Several independent documentaries and productions for individuals and corporate organizations.

== Publications ==
=== Books ===
- Across The Gulf, Benue, Nigeria: Savhage Books, 2017 ISBN 978-978-537-99-5-2
- Deeper into the Night, Benue, Nigeria: Savhage Books, 2014, ISBN 978-978-525-95-4-4
- Melancholia, Benue, Nigeria: Savehage Books, 2014
- Ugba Uye: The Living Legend, Jos, Nigeria: Kraftbooks, 2012
- Shadows and Ashes, Jos : Arrowhead Publications, 1998, ISBN 978-978-525-95-9-9, Kraftbooks, 2012
- Why Women Won't Make it to Heaven, Jos: Topshots Productions, 2002; Ibadan: Kraftbooks, 2011 ISBN 978-978-047-93-7-4

=== Chapters contributed to books ===
- "Political Commitment in the African Novel: Ngugi wa Thiong’o’s Militant Perspective", in Mala Pandurang (ed). Ngugi wa Thiong’o: An Anthology of Recent Criticism, New Delhi: Pencraft International, 2007, pp. 41–62.
- "The Unexploited Power of Film: Contemporary Nigerian Society and the Mass Media", in M. J. Sokomba and Edward Ossai (eds). Beyond the Screen: A Journal of the National Film Institute, Vol. 1, No. 1, 2006, Jos: National Film Institute, 2006, pp. 148–161.
- "The Gaze is Veiled: The Portrayal of Women in Hausa Films", in Abdullahi Uba Adamu (et al.) (eds), Hausa Home Videos: Technology, Economy and Society, Kano: Center for Hausa Cultural Studies, 2004, pp. 187–193.
- "Poetry as the Expression of Anger: A study of Tanure Ojaide’s Fate of Vultures and other poems" in Okome, Onookome (ed). Writing the Homeland: The poetry and politics of Tanure Ojaide, Bayereuth: African Studies series No. 62, 2002, pp. 209–221.
- "Art and Culture in Hausa Video Films" in Haynes, Jonathan (ed). Nigerian Video Films, Ohio: Ohio University Center for international Studies, 2002, pp. 200–208.
- "Art for National Unity: A Reading of Emman Usman Shehu’s 'Questions for Big Brother'" in Azuike, Macpherson (ed). Studies in Language and Literature, Jos: Department of English, University of Jos, 2001, pp. 188–197.
