= Emem Usoro =

Nigerian banker

Deputy Governor for operations of the Central Bank of Nigeria
- Incumbent
- Assumed office 26 September 2023

Personal details
- Born: Nigeria
- Education: MBA from Obafemi Awolowo University
- Occupation: Banker

Emem Nnana Usoro is a Nigerian banker who serves as the Deputy Governor for Operations at the Central Bank of Nigeria. She was appointed in 2023 by President Ahmed Bola Tinubu and confirmed by the Nigerian Senate on 26 September 2023.

== Early life and education ==
Usoro holds a bachelor's degree in biochemistry from the University of Uyo and an MBA from Obafemi Awolowo University. She is an alumnus of the Lagos Business School and had also attended Harvard Business School.

== Career ==
Usoro has worked in the commercial banking and financial services sector for over 20 years. She joined the United Bank for Africa in 2011 and rose to the post of Executive Director. She is a fellow of the Chartered Institute of Bankers of Nigeria.

During her career at the United Bank for Africa (UBA), Usoro worked to reach the unbanked in the north and to improve financial literacy. In 2019, she was featured in UBA's Superwoman magazine as a role model for women.
