= Patrick Asadu =

Nigerian politician and Medical Practitioner

Member of the House of Representatives of Nigeria for Enugu State
- In office 2007–2023
- Preceded by: Hon Charles Ugwu
- Constituency: Nsukka/Igbo-Eze South

Personal details
- Born: Patrick Oziokoja Asadu; 23 August 1964 (age 62) Ovoko, Enugu State, Nigeria
- Party: Nigeria Democratic Congress (2026–present)
- Other political affiliations: People's Democratic Party; All Progressives Congress
- Profession: Medical practitioner, politician

Patrick Oziokoja Asadu (born 23 August 1964) is a Nigerian politician and a medical practitioner who hails from Ovoko in Igbo-eze South local government area of Enugu State. He represented the Nsukka/Igbo-eze South Federal Constituency at the Federal House of Representatives for four consecutive terms beginning in 2007. He was appointed an Honourable Commissioner of Enugu State in 2000 after joining the Peoples Democratic Party (PDP).

After leaving the PDP, Asadu became a member of the All Progressive Congress (APC). In May 2026, he left the APC and joined the Nigeria Democratic Congress (NDC). He is the NDC candidate for Enugu North Senatorial District in the 2027 Nigerian general election.

== Early life ==
Asadu was born to the family of Pa David Ezenwa Asadu and the matriarch of the family, Mary Oriefi Asadu (nee Eze-Okwechi), both deceased. He attended Boy's Secondary School, Ovoko, and in 1982 he passed the West African Examination Council (WASC) with distinctions. Asadu studied medicine and surgery at the University of Nigeria, Nsukka and graduated with an MBBS in 1988. He also obtained a Master's of Public Health from the University of Nigeria, Nsukka. Asadu worked as a medical practitioner in the public and private sectors. Asadu is married.

== Political appointments ==
Asadu has held several political offices, which include:

- Hon. Commissioner for Sciecnce & Technology, Enugu State – 2001
- Hon. Commissioner for Land and Housing, Enugu State 2000–2001
- Hon. Commissioner for Health Enugu state 2001–2002
- Chairman Transition Committee, Igbo-Eze South LGA 2002–2003
- Hon. Commissioner for Agriculture Enugu State 2003–2005
- Hon. Commissioner for Environment Enugu State 2005–2006
