= Mohammed Mustapha Namadi =

Personal details
- Born: March 25, 1959 (age 67) Kano State, Nigeria
- Party: All Progressives Congress (APC)
- Education: Bayero University Kano, Florida State University
- Profession: Medical sociologist

Mohammed Mustapha Namadi is a professor and the dean of Faculty of Social Sciences, Federal University of Kashere, Gombe State, Nigeria. He previously served as Commissioner for Higher Education and Commissioner for Agriculture and Natural Resources in Kano State, Nigeria. In May 2021, Namadi was appointed to the Governing Body of the National Senior Citizens Centre by President Muhammadu Buhari.
