= Nasir Adhama =

Nigerian politician (born 1977)

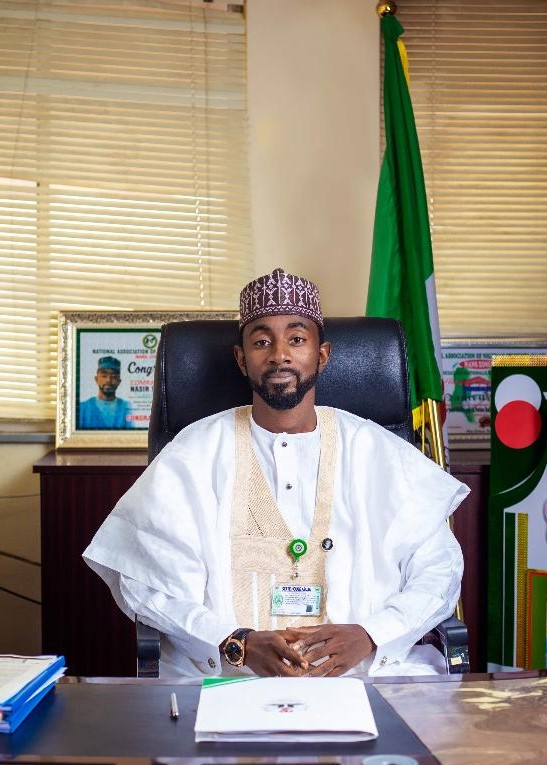
- Born: Kano State
- Occupations: Politician, entrepreneur, youth activist
- Years active: 2003-present
- Term: 2015 to 2023

Nasir Adhama (born in Kano, Nigeria, is a Nigerian politician and youth activist who served as a Senior Special Assistant to Nigeria's President Muhammadu Buhari on Youth and Student affairs.

== Education ==
Upon the victory of Muhammadu Buhari in the presidential election in the 2015, Adhama was appointed Special Assistant on Youth and Student to the President. In 2016, as part of Nigeria government's effort at addressing the issue of unemployment, he developed a partnership with Huawei Technologies to train 1000 youth in Information Communication Technology across Nigeria.

In 2020, Adhama led the Nigerian Youth Task Force complementing the work of the Presidential Task Force on COVID-19 by deploying its army of volunteers which includes trained medical personnel with vivid knowledge of the pandemic.

Adhama was listed as one of the 100 most influential youth in Nigeria by Avance Media.
