= O. C. Adesina =

Nigerian professor of history

Prof Olutayo Charles Adesina FNAL
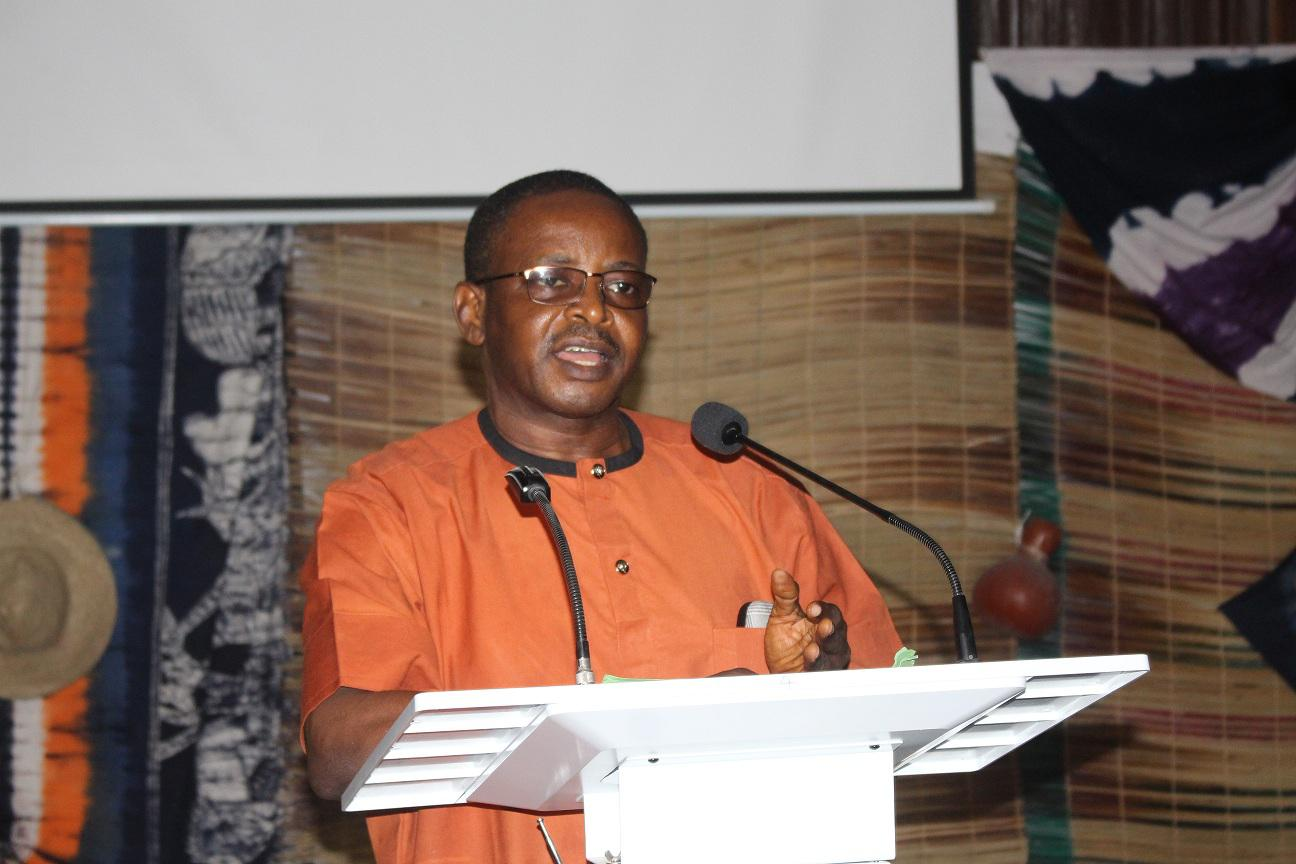
- Born: January 27, 1964; Ipetumodu, Osun State, Nigeria
- Education: University of Ife; Obafemi Awolowo University
- Occupations: Historian and university professor
- Employer: University of Ibadan
- Known for: Historiography in Africa
- Notable work: Globalization and Transnational Migrations: Africa and Africans in the Contemporary Global System. Marginality and Crisis: Globalization and Identity in Contemporary Africa. Nigeria in the Twentieth Century: History, Governance and Society.
- Spouse: Dr. Oluwakemi Abiodun Adesina (m.1997)
- Children: Aanuoluwapo Adesina; Olajumoke Adesina; Ebunoluwa Adesina; Ireoluwa Adesina
- Parent(s): Mr. John Oyebade Adesina; Mrs. Olajumoke Ruphina Adesina (née Ogunnaiya)
- Relatives: Prof. Foluke Ogunleye (née Adesina) (sister)
- Awards: 2023-2024 British Academy Global Professorship. Fellow of the Atlantic History, Charles Warren Center, Harvard University. African Visiting Fellow, Rhodes Chair of Race Relations, St. Antony’s College, Oxford University. Fellow, Institute of Advanced Studies, Jawaharlal Nehru University, New Delhi, India.
- Website: www.facultyofartsui.org/staff/academic-staff/professor-adesina-c.%20olutayo/

Olutayo Charles Adesina is a professor of history at the University of Ibadan. His research interests are in the fields of economic history of West Africa, history of development, and Nigerian history. Adesina is a Fellow of the Nigerian Academy of Letters. He has at different times served as the Head of the History Department at the University of Ibadan.

== Education and career ==
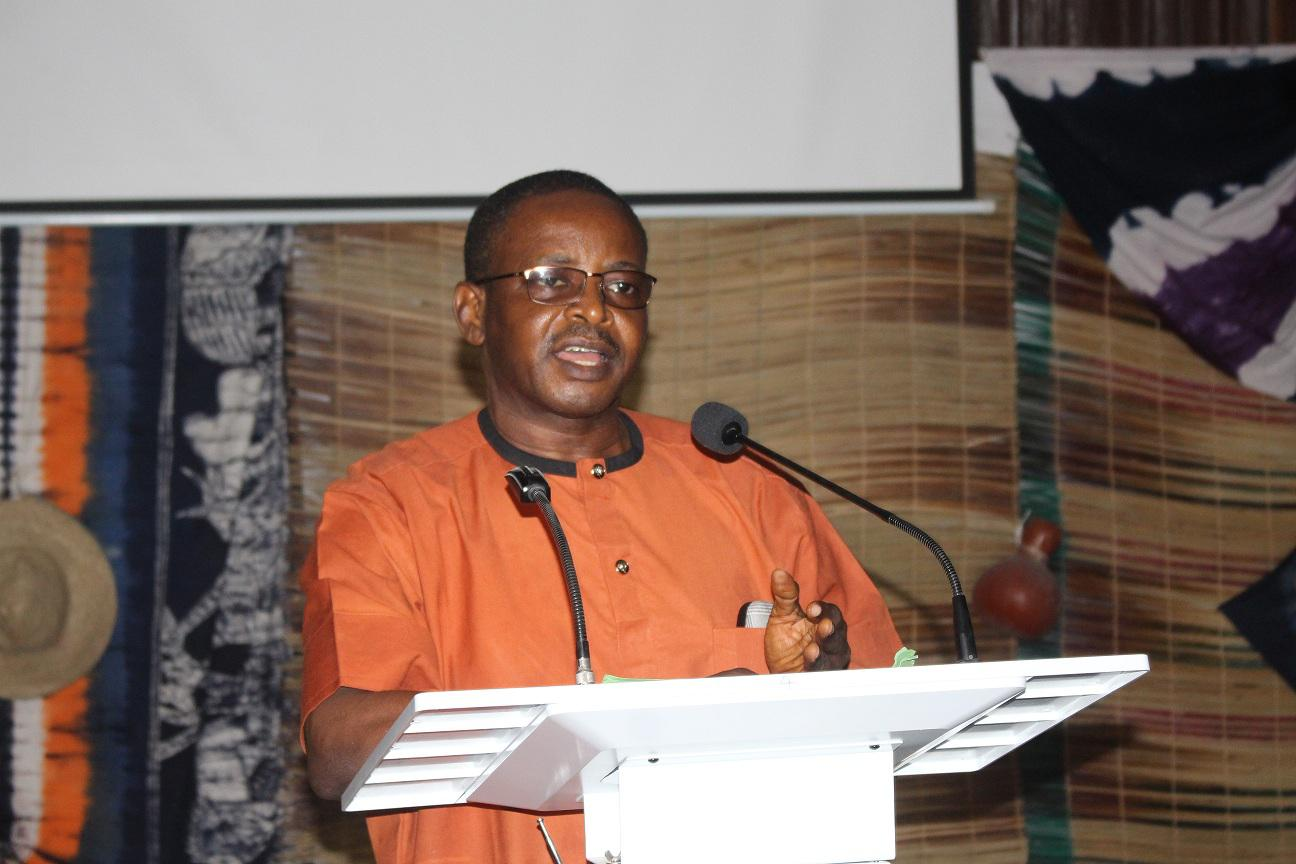
Adesina giving a Lecture at the Centre for Black Culture and International Understanding (CBCIU), Osogbo

Adesina was educated at the Obafemi Awolowo University (OAU, formerly University of Ife), where he earned his bachelors (in 1985), masters (in 1989), and his doctorate degrees (in 1994) all in history. From 1989 through 1991, Adesina was engaged as a teaching assistant at the Obafemi Awolowo University, Ile-Ife (1989–91), and a Lecturer Grade III at the Adeyemi College of Education, Ondo, Nigeria from 1991 to 1993. He joined the faculty of the Department of History, University of Ibadan, in 1993, rising to the rank of full professor in 2007. Over time, Adesina has served as the departmental head three times (2001–2003, 2006–2008 and 2019–2021), and as the Director of the university's Centre for General Studies.

In 1994, Adesina was a Grantee of the United States Information Agency at the Boston College, Massachusetts. He has also received several distinguished visiting fellowship awards, including the Fellowship of Salzburg Seminar, Austria (2001); Fellow of the Atlantic History, Charles Warren Center, Harvard University (1998); the African Visiting Fellow, Rhodes Chair of Race Relations, St Antony's College, Oxford (2004/2005); and, Fellow of the Institute of Advanced Studies, Jawaharlal Nehru University, New Delhi (2009).

In 2004 and 2014, Adesina was a visiting professor at Kennesaw State University, Georgia, US. In October 2019, he was the Distinguished Visiting Guest Lecturer at the Centre for African Studies, Shanghai Normal University, Shanghai, China.

Adesina is a current Editor of Africa Review. In May 2017, Adesina was elected as president of the Society of Nigerian Archivists, taking over from Gabriel Alegbeleye. In 2018, he was inducted as a Fellow of the Nigerian Academy of Letters.

In April 2024, the British Academy awarded Adesina the prestigious Global Professorship. As of April 2024, he is one of only two Nigerians to have received the award since it began in 2018. The Global Professorship program is supported by the Department for Science, Innovation and Technology. For this award, Adesina received the equivalent of $1,000,000.

== Selected publications ==
- Adesina, Olutayo Charles, ed. Nigeria in the Twentieth Century: History, Governance and Society. Connel Publications, 2017.
- Adesina, Olutayo Charles (2017-11-27), "Soccer victory authorized by the gods", Global Perspectives on Sports and Christianity, Routledge, pp. 80–95, doi:10.4324/9781315738352-6, ISBN 9781315738352
- Adesina, Olutayo C. (2020-07-14). ""A Terrain…Angels Would Fear to Tread": Biographies and History in Nigeria". Journal for Contemporary History. 45 (1). doi:10.18820/24150509/sjch45.v1.2. ISSN 0258-2422. S2CID 225643431.
- Adesina, Olutayo C. (2006). "Teaching History in Twentieth Century Nigeria: The Challenges of Change". History in Africa. 33: 17–37. doi:10.1353/hia.2006.0002. ISSN 0361-5413. S2CID 161497947.
- Adesina, Olutayo C. "Globalization and the Unending Frontier: An Overview." Journal of Global Initiatives: Policy, Pedagogy, Perspective 3, no. 2 (2010): 107–110.
- Adesina, Olutayo C. "Nigerian Political Leadership and Yoruba-Hausa/Fulani Relations: A Historical Synthesis." International Journal of Humanistic Studies 4 (2005): 17–33.
- Adebayo, Akanmu G.; Adesina, Olutayo C., eds. (2009-03-26). Globalization and Transnational Migrations: Africa and Africans in the Contemporary Global System. Cambridge Scholars Publishing. ISBN 978-1-4438-0804-0.
