= Bolaji Akinboro =

Nigerian entrepreneur

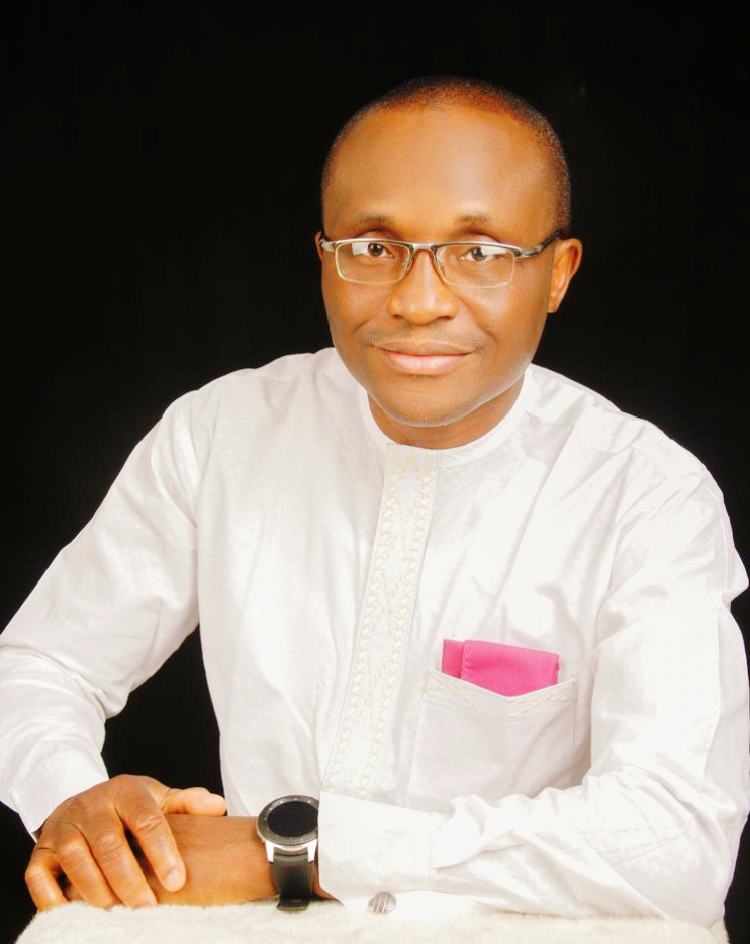
- Citizenship: Nigeria
- Education: Heriot-Watt University (Business Management), University of Oxford (Business Economics), Harvard University (Executive programmes)
- Occupations: Entrepreneur, technology executive
- Website: https://bolakiakinboro.com

Bolaji Akinboro is a Nigerian entrepreneur and technology executive, known for co-founding Cellulant, a pan-African fintech company. He has been involved in agritech, blockchain, and financial technology initiatives across Africa, and has held leadership roles in both the private and public sectors.

== Career ==
Akinboro co-founded Cellulant Corporation alongside Ken Njoroge in 2004, where he served as the co-chief executive officer of Cellulant Nigeria. Under his leadership, the company expanded to provide payment and mobile banking services across multiple African countries.

He played a leading role in the development of Nigeria's Growth Enhancement Support Scheme (GESS), which introduced an electronic wallet system for distributing farm inputs. Between 2012 and 2016, the program delivered fertilizer and seeds worth over US$1 billion to more than seven million rural farmers.

Akinboro is credited with creating the AgriKore platform, a blockchain-based e-wallet system connecting farmers with suppliers, markets, and financial services. The system has been adopted in other countries, including Liberia, Togo, and Afghanistan. His work spans fintech, agritech, sustainable innovation, and blockchain.

He later co-founded Tórónet Chain, a blockchain protocol focused on decentralized economic systems, and VorianCorelli, a marketplace for agricultural small and medium-sized enterprises (SMEs). On his success, he attributes it to being a visionary who conquered the global stage by remaining committed to his African roots.

== Legal issues ==
In 2022, Akinboro and a former subsidiary of Cellulant faced allegations of financial misconduct. He was forced to resign, and 48 employees were dismissed. The case was later resolved through an out-of-court agreement, and he was cleared of wrongdoing.

== Education ==
Akinboro obtained a postgraduate qualification in Business Management from Heriot-Watt University in 2005 and later studied Business Economics at University of Oxford's Said Business School. He also completed executive education programmes at Harvard Business School and Endeavor Global.

== Recognition ==
He has been recognized as an Endeavor Entrepreneur for his role in building high-impact ventures in Africa.

== See also ==
- Agriculture in Nigeria
