= Emomotimi Agama =

Nigerian Securities Regulator

Director-General Emomotimi Agama
- Citizenship: Nigerian
- Education: University of Benin (M.Sc.); Rivers State University of Science and Technology (Ph.D.)
- Occupations: Securities and Exchange Regulation
- Organization(s): Securities and Exchange Commission, Nigeria
- Website: https://sec.gov.ng/

Emomotimi Agama is a Nigerian securities and exchange regulator. He is the Director General of the Securities and Exchange Commission (SEC) of Nigeria. He was appointed by President Ahmed Bola Tinubu in April 2024 and was confirmed by the Nigerian Senate in June 2024.

== Education ==
Agama attended the Rivers State University of Science and Technology, graduating in 1991 with a Bachelors in Accounting and subsequently proceeded to the University of Benin, obtaining an MSc in Banking and Finance in 1997 and a second MSc in Economics in 2000. He proceeded to the Nile University, Abuja and successfully obtained a PhD in 2022 with a research focus on "Impact of Cryptocurrency Operations on Macroeconomic Variables in Nigeria". He also holds a postgraduate certificate in capital markets from George Washington University School of Business.

== Career ==
Prior to his appointment as Director General of Securities and Exchange Commission, Agama had served as the Managing Director of the Nigerian Capital Market Institute, a subsidiary of the SEC. He was also seconded to the US Securities and Exchange Commission in 2018.

Agama began his career at the University of Benin where he worked as Accountant and part-time lecturer between 1993 and 2002. He then moved to the National Centre for Women Development, serving as Personal Assistant to the Director General between 2002 and 2003. He subsequently joined the SEC in February 2004 as a Senior Financial Analyst and Special Assistant to the Executive Commissioner (Operations). He rose to become the Deputy Head of Exchanges in 2018, and subsequently the Managing Director of the Capital Market Institute before his appointment as Director General of SEC.

=== Tenure as Director General ===
Since assumption of office, Agama's role at SEC has mainly focused on regulating the digital assets industry, licensing crypto exchanges, tackling identity management issues in the industry, stimulating innovative instruments in the capital market and providing an enabling environment that fosters investor confidence in Nigeria.
