= Philip Agbese =

Nigerian politician

Member of House of Representatives for Ado/Okpokwu/Ogbadibo Federal Constituency
- Incumbent
- Assumed office 27 May 2023
- Preceded by: Francis Ottah Agbo

Philip Agbese is a Nigerian politician who has been serving as the member of the House of Representatives representing Ado/Okpokwu/Ogbadibo Federal Constituencies since May 2023.

== Early life and career ==
Agbese attended University of Ilorin and later graduated with an LL.B after furthering his education at Middlesex University where he acquired his masters in Human Rights Laws.

On 27 February 2023, he emerged victorious to represent Ado/Okpokwu/Ogbadibo federal constituencies at the 10th House of Representatives.
