= Adeola Ogunmola Showemimo =

Nigerian aircraft pilot

Adeola Sowemimo is a Nigerian aircraft pilot.

== Career ==
She started her aviation career at the US-based Sunrise Aviation Academy where she graduated in 2011.

=== Achievements ===
In 2019, she became the first Nigerian female pilot to work for Qatar Airways in the Middle East, a region which is challenging for women hoping to become pilot.

She is also the first female Nigerian to fly the Boeing 787 Dreamliner for Qatar Airways.

She is the first Nigerian female pilot to fly the Boeing 767 Aircraft across the Atlantic Ocean, being in the same league with Kenya's Captain Irene Koki, and Ethiopia's Captain Amsale Gulau.
