= Adamu Abdu-Kafarati =

Nigerian jurist (1954–2021)

Chief Judge, Federal High Court of Nigeria

Justice
- Former
- In office 2018–2019
- Succeeded by: Justice John Tsoho

Adamu Abdu-Kafarati (1954–2021) was a Nigerian jurist. He was the chief judge of the Federal High Court of Nigeria.

== Early life and education ==
Kafarati was born in 1954 in Kwami, a local government area of Gombe State. He attended Kafarati Primary School between January 1962 and December 1968. He attended Government Secondary School, Gombe, between 1969 and 1973. He also attended the Northeast College of Arts & Science (NECAS), Maiduguri, between October 1973 and June 1975. He studied law at Ahmadu Bello University, Zaria, from October 1975 to June 1978, and he graduated from the Nigerian Law School, Lagos, in 1979.

== Career ==
Kafarati began his career after his National Youth Service Corps (NYSC) programme as a State Counsel II at the Bauchi State Ministry of Justice. He became the principal state counsel in 1987 and served as assistant administrator-general before he was appointed a judge of the Federal High Court on October 31, 1991. He was inaugurated as the acting chief judge of the Federal High Court on September 16, 2017, and eventually became the chief judge of the court on June 7, 2018. Adam Abdu-Kafarati retired 13 months later, clocking the mandatory retirement age of 65 on July 25, 2019.

== Death ==
Adamu Abdu Kafarati died on February 25, 2021, around 7:30 pm, after his usual evening Maghrib prayer in Abuja.
