= Abubakar Surajo Imam =

Nigerian professor

Academic background
- Education: Bayero University Kano; Newcastle University

Academic work
- Discipline: Mechatronics and Robotics
- Institutions: Nigeria Defence Academy

Abubakar Surajo Imam is the Nigerian first army professor. He specialises in mechatronics and robotics and he is the current Head of the Department of Mechatronics Engineering at the Nigerian Defence Academy.

== Early life and education ==
Imam is a native of Kankia in Katsina State. He obtained his first degree from Bayero University Kano in Mechanical Engineering in 2001. He bagged his Msc and Phd in Mechatronics and Robotics from Newcastle University, United Kingdom in 2009 and 2014 respectively.

== Career ==
Imam started his career as a member of short-service combatant course 32 and was attached to the electrical and mechanical engineering department. He later became a regular commission and conducted his researches and teachings in different units and universities such as Air Force Institute of Technology in Kaduna; Ahmadu Bello University in Zaria; Aliko Dangote University of Science and Technology in Kano State; and Defence Industries Corporation of Nigeria.

== Publications ==
- Mechatronics for Beginners: 21 Projects for PIC Microcontrollers (2012).
- Design and construction of a small-scale rotorcraft uav system. (2014).
- Quadrotor model predictive flight control system. (2014).
