= Adebayo Adepoju =

Nigerian politician and businessman

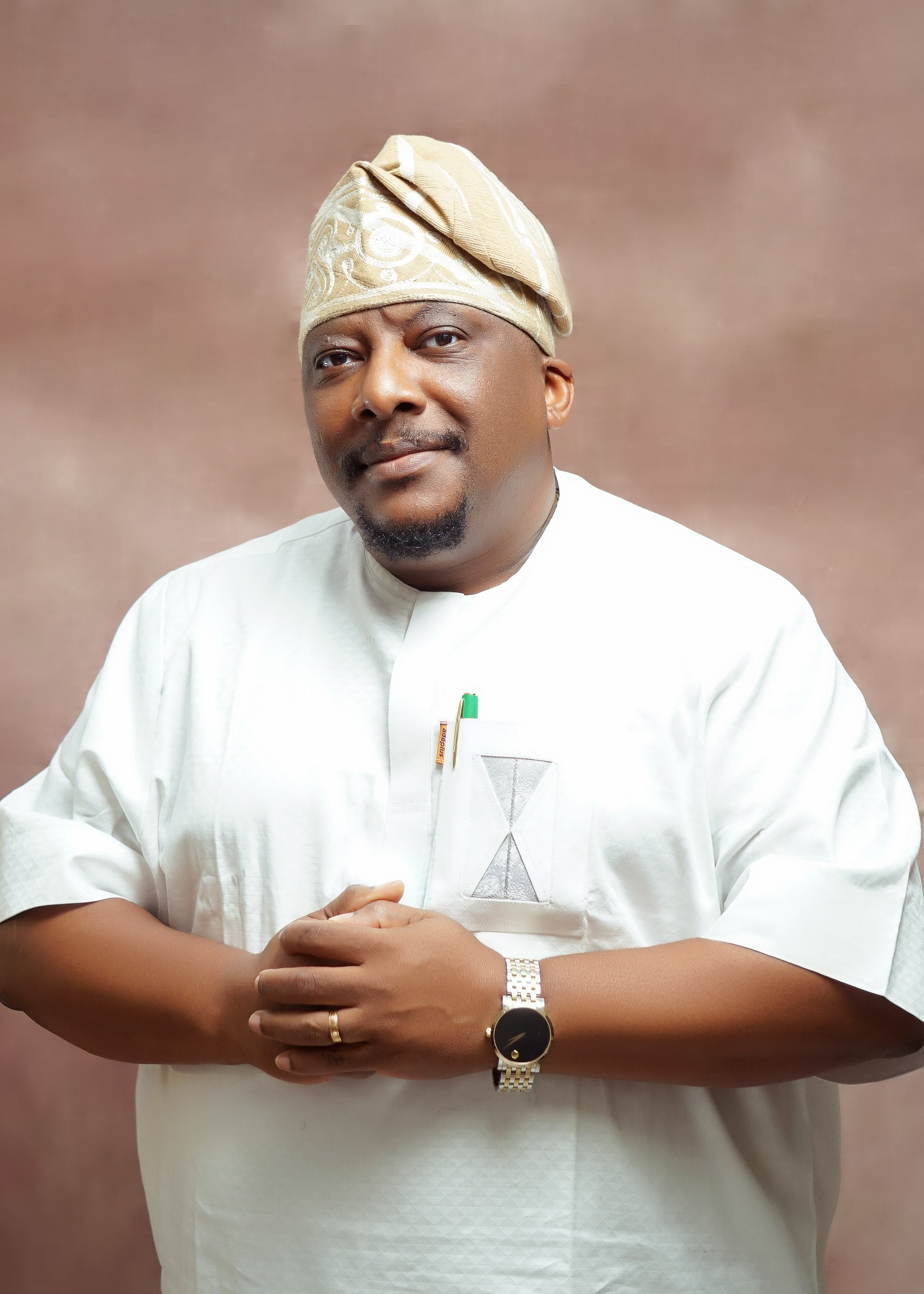
- Born: Anthony Adebayo Adepoju
- Website: Official website

Anthony Adebayo Adepoju is a Nigerian politician, businessman and philanthropist who is representing Ibarapa Central and Ibarapa North Federal Constituency of Oyo State in the 10th Assembly and doubles as the Deputy Chairman of the House Committee on Federal Character Commission since 2023. He previously served as the Chairman of Water Corporation of Oyo State. He is a member of the Peoples Democratic Party (PDP).

On Monday, June 17, 2024, the Ibarapa region of Oyo State achieved a historic milestone by producing the first-ever One-Day House of Representatives Member in Nigeria. This unique initiative, a product of the Ibarapa Central and Ibarapa North Federal Constituency, was spearheaded by Hon. (Dr.) Adebayo Adepoju, a member representing the Ibarapa Central and Ibarapa North Federal Constituency.

The programme allows a young person, typically a student, to spend a day in the House of Representatives, observing and learning about the legislative process. The initiative aims to inspire young people to take an interest in governance and leadership.

Oladosu Peace Oluwaseyi, a native of Idere in Ibarapa Central Local Government Area of Oyo State who is a senior secondary school student of Favourland College, Igboora, won the keenly contested intellectual competition on Monday, June 17, 2024, and was declared the "One Day Rep." and will have the opportunity to travel by flight with her parents to Abuja, spend a day in the House of Representatives, meet with the Speaker, attend a plenary session when lawmakers are back from Sallah Break, a day of decision-making for the constituency, and learn about the legislative process.

Finalists were evaluated on presentation (oratory skills), essay writing (writing proficiency), and spelling bees (spelling and pronunciation accuracy).

Hon. (Dr.) Adepoju had announced his readiness to have a one-day House of Representatives Member Initiative incorporated while releasing his 100-day account of stewardship in September 2023. The first-of-its kind programme aims to engage young minds, foster future legislators from the federal constituency, inspire children to succeed regardless of their socio-economic background, and incorporate youth-driven initiatives previously overlooked. The programme also seeks to develop intellectually minded young leaders for the constituency's progress. Hon. (Dr.) Adepoju's initiative is a commendable effort to engage young minds and promote youth in governance.

== Early life and education ==
Adepoju was born in Igboora, Oyo State, Nigeria. He received his doctorate in business management from J. Mack Robinson College of Business at Georgia State University. He also holds an MBA, an MSc in management with a focus on project management, a BSc in accounting, a PGD in financial management, and HND and OND degrees in accounting.

== Career ==
Adepoju has worked as a business manager and project management professional.

Adepoju has been a vocal proponent of protecting Nigerians from discrimination and workplace violations committed by foreign companies and foreigners. He has raised a Motion in the 10th House of Representatives calling for the protection of Nigerians. The resolution has since been referred to the House Committee on Human Rights for investigation.
