= Shaibu Atadoga =

President of Kogi State Customary Court of Appeal

The Honourable Shaibu Atadoga

President of Kogi State Customary Court of Appeal
- Preceded by: Samuel Otta
- Succeeded by: Bayo Olusegun

Personal details
- Born: Ibrahim Shaibu Atadoga
- Died: 21 June 2020
- Profession: Lawyer

Ibrahim Shaibu Atadoga (Born on December 31, 1958) was a Nigerian lawyer who served as the president of Kogi State Customary Court of Appeal.

== Early life and career ==
Shaibu Atadoga was from Omala, Kogi State, Nigeria. He was called to the Nigerian bar in 1986. He became the president of Kogi State Customary Court of Appeal after Samuel Otta retired. On 8 July 2020, Bayo Olusegun replaced Atadoga as the president of Kogi State Customary Court of Appeal, but in acting capacity.

== Death ==
Atadoga died on 21 June 2020.
