= Wilson Sabiya =

Nigerian politician

Governor of Adamawa State
- In office 27 August 1991 - January 1992

Personal details
- Born: 12 January 1938
- Died: 30 March 2004 (aged 66)

Wilson Sabiya (January 12, 1938 – March 30, 2004) was Governor of Adamawa State, Nigeria from 27 August 1991 to January 1992. He was also the first governor of the state.
