= Cletus Nzebunwa Aguwa =

Nigerian academic and first Professor of Clinical Pharmacy in Africa

- Education: Howard University
- Occupation: Clinical Pharmacist

Cletus Nzebunwa Aguwa was the first academic clinical pharmacist to be employed in Nigeria. He was also the first Professor of Clinical Pharmacy in Africa.

== Early life and education ==
He studied at St. Joseph's School, Eke Nguru (Now Central School, Eke Nguru) in Aboh Mbaise, Imo State for his primary education. He also studied at Holy Ghost College, Owerri, through the Eastern Nigerian Regional Scholarship (1960–1964). Thereafter, he proceeded to Trinity High School, Oguta for two years higher programme (1965–1966). He studied Pharmacy at Howard University College of Pharmacy, Washington D.C., USA and achieved a Bachelor of Science in Pharmacy. In 1987, he became the first Professor of Clinical Science in Black Africa.

== Appointments ==
After his studies at Howard University, he was offered employment as Assistant Professor of Clinical Pharmacy at Howard for four years (1974–1978). He was then employed by the Faculty of Pharmaceutical Sciences, University of Nigeria, Nsukka.

== Fellowships ==
He was a fellow at Pharmaceutical Society of Nigeria (FPSN) and the West African Postgraduate College of Pharmacists (FPCPharm).
