= Cornelia O'Dwyer =

Talk Show Host

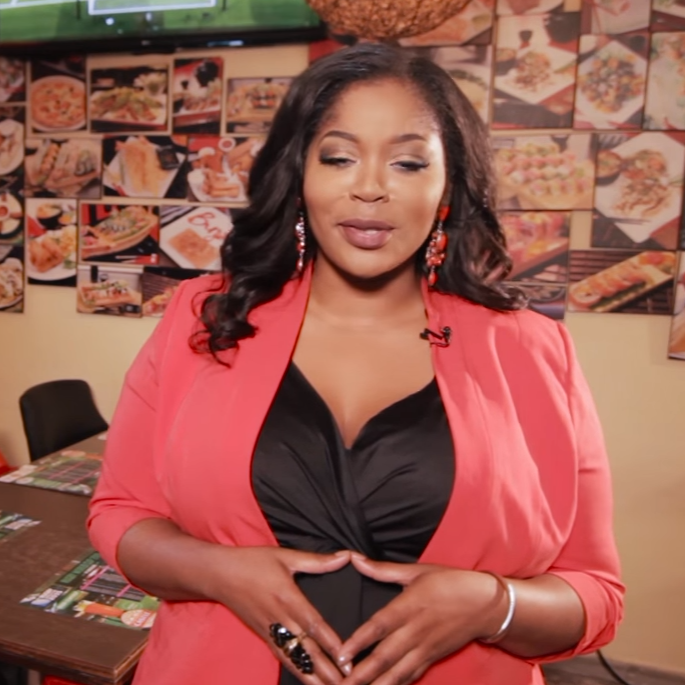
- Cornelia O'Dwyer talks about Ageism on NdaniTV in August 2015
- Born: Cornelia O'Dwyer; 1984 (age 41–42); San Francisco
- Education: University of the West of England, Bristol,
- Occupations: Talk show host, writer, executive producer, video content creator
- Website: corneliaodwyer.com

Cornelia O’Dwyer (born 1984) is a talk show host, writer, executive producer, and video content creator based out of Lagos, Nigeria, and New York City. She was the host of Ndani TV’s talk show titled Ndani Real Talk and a former co-host on Smooth 98.1 FM's entertainment breakfast show called Grapevine 981. She was also a columnist for Today's Woman Magazine (TW). Cornelia is the Host and Executive Producer of Talk Show Chick Chat Live on Fox Life Africa airing on DSTV, Startimes, and Kwese TV across sub-Saharan Africa. She is also the Creative Director of Carmarcon Media.

== Early life and education ==
Cornelia was born in San Francisco and raised in Nigeria. In 1998, she left Nigeria for England at the age of 14 after her mother died in a gas explosion. In 2005, she obtained a Bachelor of Arts (BA) in Film, Culture and Media Studies from the University of the West of England in Bristol. At the age of 21, she moved to New York City, where she worked for about seven years before returning to Nigeria in 2011.

== Career ==
Cornelia was an executive assistant with Morgan Stanley, in greater New York City area in 2005 till 2008. She moved to AIG, New York City in 2008 as an executive assistant/risk analyst, where she managed aspects of AIG's risk/insurance programs. Then, she moved to Citi brand, New York City as the cash management specialist, through 2011. Cornelia returned to Nigeria and joined Bestman Games as business development manager/executive assistant to the chief executive officer (CEO), in November 2012. While in this position, she became the campaign manager for TRACE in September 2014. Cornelia's roles as business development manager and campaign manager expired in September 2015 and November 2015 respectively. In 2015 she became the host of Ndani TV’s "Real Talk".

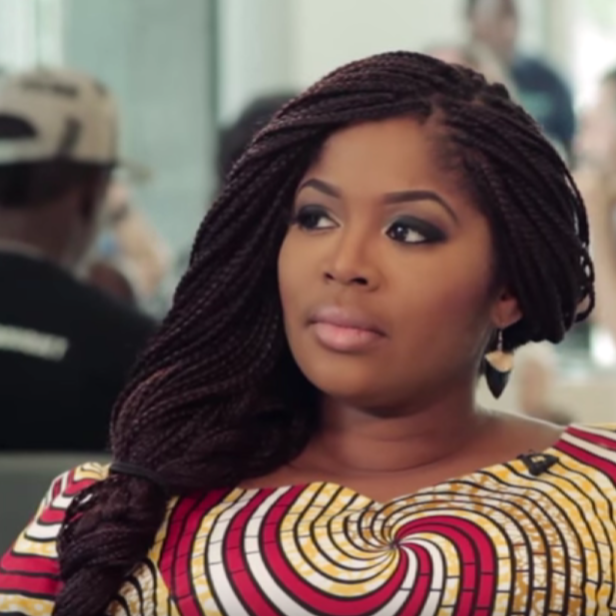
#NDANIREALTALK-S1E7-WHAT MEN WANT

In 2017, she launched the Chick Chat Live TV Show in partnership with DZRPT TV and 5ive Music group. The show was distributed by Fox Africa.
