= Taofik Adegbite =

Nigerian businessman

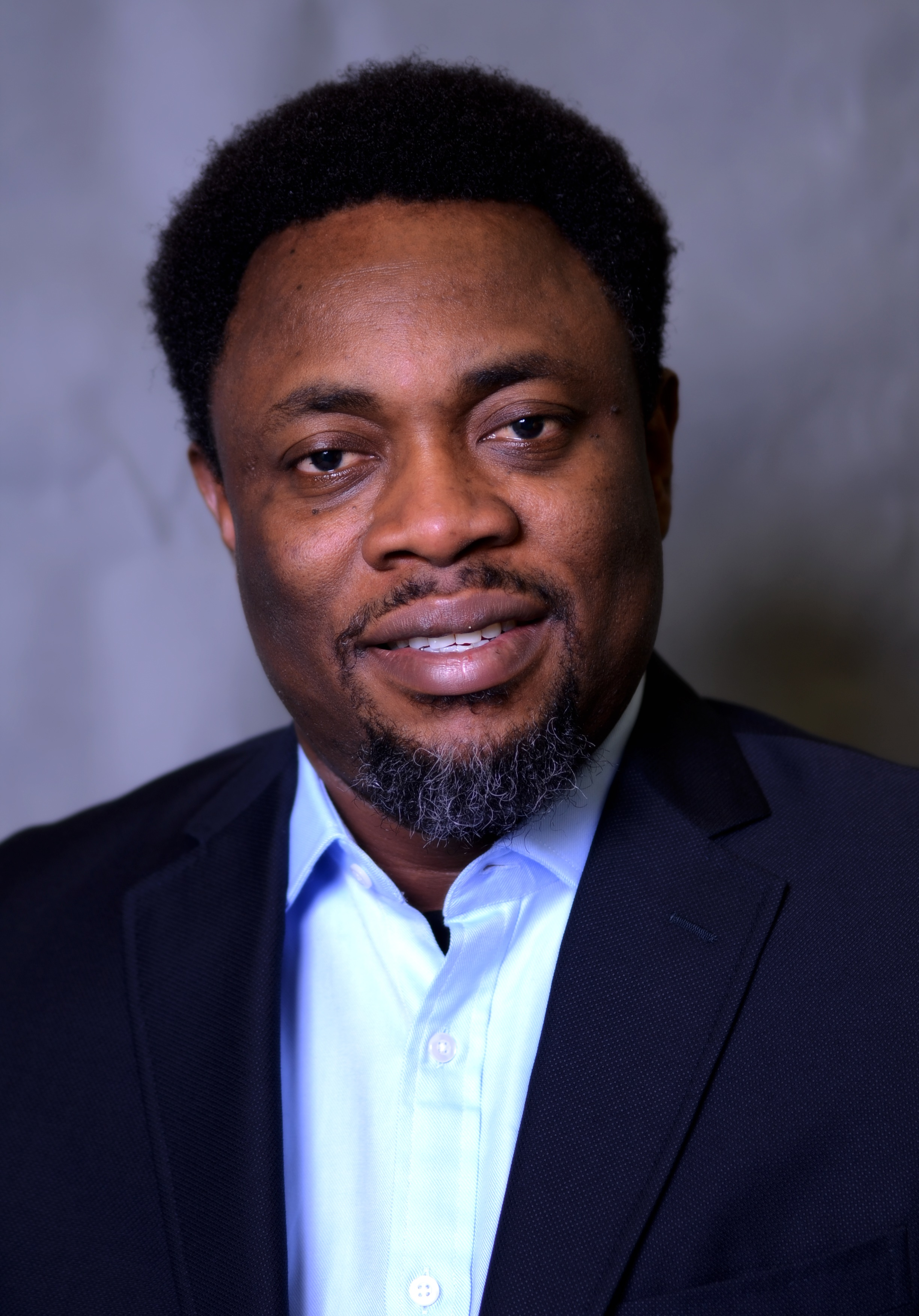
- Occupation: Businessman

Taofik Adegbite is a Nigerian businessman. He is the founder and chief executive officer of Marine Platforms Limited and the Norwegian Consul General in Nigeria. Adegbite is the first Nigerian to deliver an offshore subsea construction vessel for the oil and gas sector in Nigeria which is named African Inspiration by the Norwegian government through the first ever shipbuilding contract between a Nigerian company and a Norwegian shipyard.

== Education ==
Adegbite holds a BSc in computer science from the University of Ibadan. He later attended the London School of Economics for a certificate course in strategy and organization management; as well as Harvard Business School OPM 44.

== Career ==
Adegbite started his career with Agricultural Project Monitoring & Evaluation Unit, (World Bank Project).

He moved to the United Kingdom where he worked as a security guard and with Britain's National Health Service as an information technology engineer at Hammersmith Hospital.

Adegbite founded Marine Platforms in 2001 and assumed the role of director of strategy and business development, later becoming the CEO.

== Diplomacy ==
Adegbite was appointed as the Honorary Consul General for Norway, to promote business partnership between Nigeria and Norway, as well as bring the advantages of Norway into Nigeria in key areas such as energy, aquaculture and maritime.

== Personal life ==
Adegbite is married with three children.
