= Hajiya Nàja'atu Mohammed =

Nigerian politician

Hajiya Nàja’atu Mohammed
- Born: 1956 (age 69–70)
- Citizenship: Nigerian
- Education: Bachelor's degree in history
- Alma mater: Ahmadu Bello University, Zaria
- Occupation: Politician
- Known for: Political activism
- Political party: People's Democracy
- Other political affiliations: Action Congress of Nigeria
- Spouse: Bala Mohammed Bauchi
- Father: Ali Abdullahi

Hajiya Nàja’atu Mohammed, also known as Naja'atu Bala Muhammad (born 1956), is a Nigerian politician and activist. Her father was an associate of Aminu Kano.

She was Action Congress of Nigeria (ACN) Nominee for Kano Central District Senator in 2007 Nigerian General Election She is also one of the first women to have served as president of the National Students Union Nigeria in the prestigious Ahmadu Bello University, Zaria (ABU) and also the first female Vice - President of the National Association of Nigerian Students (NANS). She claimed to have brought President of Nigeria, Muhammadu Buhari, into politics.

== Early life and education ==
She was born in 1956, in the Central City of Kano into the family of Alhaji Ali Abdullahi, a socialist and one of Mallam Aminu Kano's contemporaries in the Northern Elements Progressive Union (NEPU). Muhammad attended primary school at St. Louis Private School, Kano, and went to WTC Secondary School in Kano. She obtained a bachelor's degree in history from Ahmadu Bello University, Zaria.

== Personal ==
Hajiya Nàja’atu is the widow of Bala Muhammed (or Mohammed), also known as Bala Mohammed Bauchi, a political adviser to Second Republic Governor Abubakar Rimi. Bauchi was assassinated on 10 July 1981 during Rimi's administration. Rimi was at odds with the powerful emir of Kano, Alhaji Ado Bayero, and, on 1 April 1981, created four new emirs who were declared to be co-equal with the emir of Kano – those of Auyo, Dutse, Gaya and Rano. Rimi sought to contain emir of Kano's outsized influence. Bauchi was reportedly writing the White paper that would have carried out these directives at the time of his assassination. Hajiya Nàja’atu stated, "My husband, [the] late Bala Muhammad was chopped into pieces and burnt alive for his opposition and what he was saying."

== Achievements ==
Hajiya Nàja’atu gave women's politics in Nigeria a new dimension as a political activist. As a nominee and a member of the committee responsible for fostering reconciliations between the Boko Haram Sect and Nigerian Government. She saw it as a window to nation-building and peace enhancement in the nation. Asked whether she would withdraw from the committee, she said "I vowed not to ever pull out of the committee, and as a Muslim and by the permission of Allah, I will try my best in carrying out my duties." She held the position of director Civil Society Liaison in the All Progressives Congress APC Presidential Campaign Council PCC, and was also given the position of a Commissioner at the Police Service Commission PSC in 2018 .

== Political career ==
Hajiya Nàja’atu, the Director Civil Society Liaison in the APC, PCC resigned from her office. In her letter, she wrote that the "challenges that Nigeria faces today require me to continue championing the struggle for a better country with a clear conscience as I remain absolutely loyal to Nigeria".
