= Sarki Auwalu =

Nigerian chemical engineer

Director general of the Department of Petroleum Resources (DPR)

Personal details
- Education: Ahmadu Bello University and Bayero University Kano
- Occupation: Government official
- Profession: Chemical Engineer

Sarki Auwalu (born 1965) is a Nigerian chemical engineer. He is the last director general and Chief Executive Officer of the Department of Petroleum Resources (DPR) before enactment of the Petroleum Industry Act in 2021 which created two new agencies out of the DPR. The new agencies include the Nigerian Upstream Petroleum Regulatory Commission (NUPRC) and the Nigerian Midstream and Downstream Petroleum Regulatory Agency (NMDPRA)

== Early life and education ==
Sarki was born in 1965 in Kano Nigeria. He obtained a bachelor's in Chemical Engineering from Ahmadu Bello University, Zaria. Masters in postgraduate diploma in management (1993) Bayero University Kano.

== Career ==
He worked as an environmental engineer at Kano State environmental and protection agency in 1992–1998.
