= Bunmi Dipo Salami =

Nigeria-born feminist

Bunmi Dipo-Salami
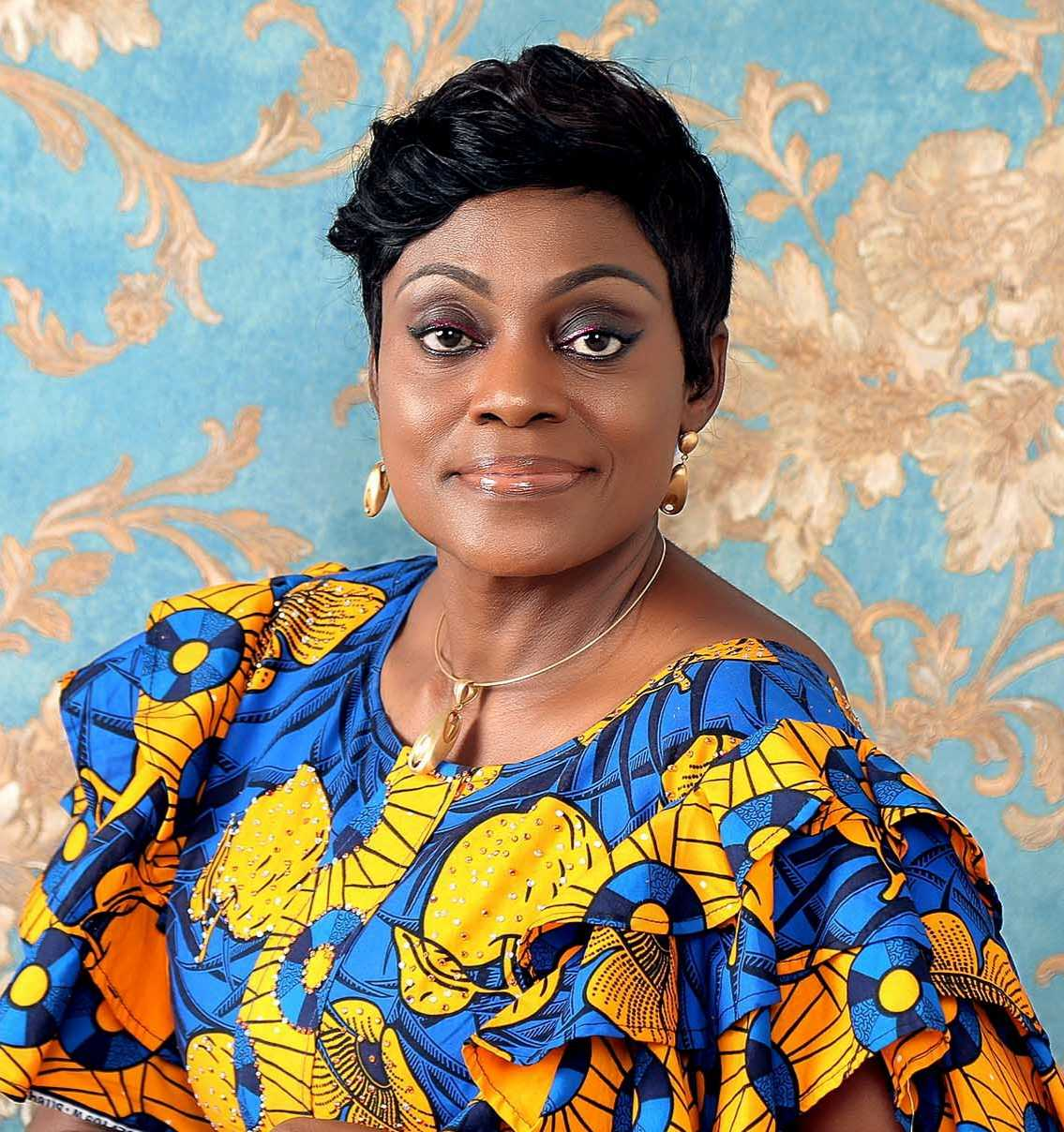
- Bunmi Dipo-Salami, JP

Personal details
- Born: August 17, 1967 (age 59)
- Spouse: Prof. Oladipo Salami
- Children: Yeside (b.1993); Dolapo (b.1995); Temisan (b.1997)
- Education: Obafemi Awolowo University; Erasmus University Rotterdam; University College London
- Occupation: Development strategist human rights activist founder pleg consulting and resources

Bunmi Dipo-Salami (born August 17, 1967) is a Nigeria-born feminist, development strategist and social entrepreneur. She is the Chief Executive at PLEG Centre, a company that helps to enhance the capacity of leaders in Nigeria and across Africa. She is the Nigeria Country Coordinator for Townhall Radio.

== Early life and education ==
Prior to working in the field of development, Bunmi trained as a teacher. She has a National Certificate in Education (NCE) with majors in English and French from the College of Education, Ikere-Ekiti (1988), and holds a bachelor's degree in education, with majors in French Language & Literature from the prestigious Obafemi Awolowo University, Ile-Ife, Nigeria (1992). When she stepped aside from teaching and moved into the area of development in 1998, she equipped herself with a [Master of Arts degree] in Development Studies, specializing in Women, Gender, Development from the International Institute of Social Studies (ISS), (now the Erasmus International Institute of Social Studies), The Hague (1992). She also possesses a Postgraduate certificate in Gender, Social Justice, and Citizenship from the Development Planning Unit (DPU) at the University College London (2007). In addition, she has a post-graduate certificate in Governance, Democratisation and Public Policy from the Erasmus International Institute of Social Studies, The Hague (2015).

== Career ==
Bunmi has served in the public, private, and non-profit sectors of the economy. She was in the education sector as a high school teacher of the French language at Moremi High School, Ile-Ife (1993–1995), and a lecturer of the French Language and Literature at tertiary institutions – Osun State College of Education (1995–1998), and Obafemi Awolowo University, Ile-Ife (1995 to 1997).

She also worked in the non-profit sector in Nigeria as a Programme Officer at the Centre for Human Development, Ile-Ife (1998–2000). She joined Baobab for Women's Human Rights, Lagos as a Programme Officer in 2000 and rose to the position of Programme Director in 2006. Similarly, was Senior Trainer and Co-Coordinator of the International Women's Democracy Network (IWDN) at the Women's Learning Partnership for Rights and Development, in the United States between 2007 and 2008. She launched LaRen Consulting in 2009 and was the Principal Consultant/CEO until she was invited to serve in the government of her home state, Ekiti in 2010. As a public servant, she functioned at different times as Commissioner as well as Special Adviser to the Governor, with responsibilities for Planning, MDGs & Multilateral Relations; Integration and Intergovernmental Affairs; and MDGs & Development Relations until 2014.

Bunmi founded PLEG Consulting and Resources, a firm involved in the provision of consultancy and contractual services in different areas – leadership and human resources management; negotiations and agreements; real estate; construction; digital media outreach; event management, among others. She is currently executive director at BAOBAB for Women's Human Rights, a nonprofit organisation committed to enhancing the status of women and girls through interventions in the following areas: Women's Rights in the World of Work; Women's Leadership Development; Gender and Accountable Governance; Young Women's Empowerment; and Strengthening Women's Organisations.

She was the Foundation Chair of the board of trustees for Brave Heart Initiative (BHI) and currently chairs the Board of Trustees of Widening Scope for Rights and Development (WISCORD) and the Centre for Gender Economics Africa (CGE-Africa). She also sits on the boards of many organisations in the non-profit and the private sectors.

A researcher and writer, Bunmi has produced five (5) academic research papers and undertaken numerous action research projects over the years. In addition, she has more than thirty (30) articles and essays to her credit and has also contributed to about ten (10) books.

== Personal life ==
Bunmi is married to professor Dipo Salami and they have three children – Yeside (1993), Dolapo (1995) and Temisan (1997). She loves to dance and travel.

== Awards and recognitions ==
- Joint Japan/World Bank Graduate Scholarship (World Bank 2001–2002)
- Chevening Fellowship (UK FCO, 2007)
- Justice of the Peace (Federal Government of Nigeria, 2012)
- Certificate of Recognition (Ministry of Gender and Development, Liberia 2012)
- Best Development and Initiative Award (Life Changers Foundation UK, 2013)
