= Deborah Omale =

Nigerian pastor and businesswoman

- Born: 29 September 1981 (age 44); Kaduna State, Nigeria
- Occupations: Pastor; televangelist
- Spouse: Emmanuel Omale (m. 2013)
- Children: 2

Deborah Omale (born 29 September 1981), is a Nigerian pastor and televangelist. She is the head pastor of Divine Hand of God Prophetic Ministry, a Christian church that runs the Divine Hand Television station from Abuja. She is the founder of Beauty Secrets.

== Life and career ==
Omale was born in Kaduna State, Nigeria. She graduated from University of Jos with a degree in mass communication. Omale is the head pastor and convener of Divine Women in God's Service, DWINGS at Divine Hand of God Prophetic Ministry.

=== Beauty Secrets ===
On 4 December 2015 in Abuja, Nigeria, Omale opened Beauty Secrets, a skincare and SPA centre. According to her, she followed in the footsteps of her mother who also had a beauty salon and sold different hair products when she was growing up, prompting her to open a salon while still an undergraduate in the university. In August 2020, Monalisa Chinda became the ambassador of the beauty centre.

== Awards and recognition ==
On 1 October 2020, Beauty Secrets won Skincare Brand of The Year at the 2020 La Mode Green October Event and received a special recognition award as the nominee brand with "the highest overall vote count" for the 2020 La Mode awards.

== Personal life ==
Omale is the wife of Emmanuel Omale, the leader and founder of Divine Hand of God Prophetic Ministry. She married Omale in 2013 and they have two children. Omale's father is a soldier from Oyo State and her mother is a businesswoman from Kogi State. She speaks fluent English, Hausa, Yoruba and Igala. While growing up, her family moved around more often, because of her father's status as a major in the army.
