= Emmanuel Omale =

Nigerian Christian leader

- Born: 31 December 1970 (age 55); Anyigba, Kogi State, Nigeria
- Occupations: Charismatic; pastor; televangelist
- Spouse: Deborah Omale (m. 2013)
- Children: 2
- Website: divinehandofgod.org

Emmanuel Omale, is a Nigerian charismatic pastor and televangelist. He is the leader and founder of Divine Hand of God Prophetic Ministry, a Christian church that runs the Divine Hand Television station from Abuja.

== Early life and education ==
Omale was born in Anyigba, Kogi State, Nigeria. He graduated from University of Abuja with a degree in sociology. In 2007, he was awarded an honorary doctorate degree in divinity from a foreign university.

== Ministry ==
Omale is the leader and founder of Divine Hand of God Prophetic Ministry. He started his church in Anyigba, Kogi State and spread to Kogi State University, before moving permanently to Abuja. The church has branches in the UK and South Africa. Omale has through his church assisted the less privileged, including women, children and homeless people.

== Controversy ==
On 12 July 2020, during the arrest and questioning of former acting chairman of Economic and Financial Crimes Commission, Ibrahim Magu by presidential probe panel in Nigeria, Omale's name was mentioned through an investigative report on EFCC's activities by the Nigerian Financial Intelligence Unit, NFIU. According to the report, it was alleged that Omale through his bank, First City Monument Bank bought a landed property in 2016 worth 573 million naira in Dubai, United Arab Emirates on Magu's behalf. Omale denied the allegations through his lawyer and went ahead to sue the News Agency of Nigeria for the story in a 1 billion naira lawsuit. Between 10 August to 12 August 2020, the presidential probe panel invited Omale, his wife, Deborah Omale and the managing director and chief executive officer of First City Monument Bank, Adam Nuru to testify before it. During the testimony, Nuru said that Omale never had such cash but a system error on 16 January 2016 credited him and 27 others with 573 million naira each, noting the bank only discovered the error upon invitation to appear before the panel. On 5 September 2020, Omale sued First City Monument Bank in a 5 billion naira lawsuit, citing that the bank falsely reported to the Nigerian Financial Intelligence Unit that 573 million naira was paid into his church account. On 27 September 2020, the bank publicly apologized to Omale, noting they regretted the error that led to the transfer of the money to his account.

== Personal life ==
Omale is an Igala man from Kogi State. He married Deborah Omale in 2013 and they have two children.
