= Kayode Ajulo =

Nigerian lawyer and politician

OON SAN Kayode Ajulo
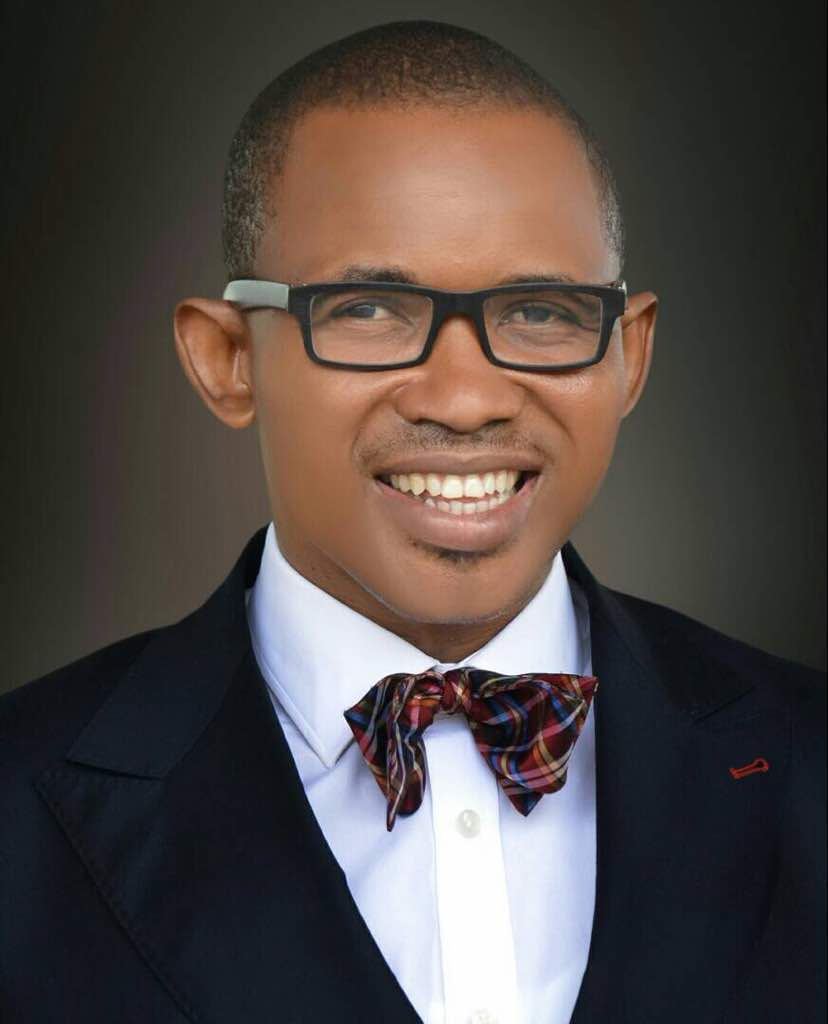
- Born: Olukayode Abraham Ajulo; Ibadan, Oyo State, Nigeria.
- Education: Nigerian Law School
- Occupations: Lawyer; arbitrator; lecturer; civil rights activist
- Website: www.castleoflaw.com

Olukayode "Kayode" Abraham Ajulo, OON, is a Senior Advocate of Nigeria, an arbitrator, tutor, orator and civil rights activist. He is a Fellow of the Chartered Institute of Arbitrators. and the Diocesan Registrar of the Anglican Communion, Church of Nigeria. He is the Attorney General and Commissioner of Justice of Ondo State.

== Early life and education ==
Ajulo was born to Solomon and Christiana Monisola O. Ajulo. He earned a bachelor's degree in law from the University of Jos in 1999. In 2001, after graduating from the Nigerian Law school in 2000, he was called to the Nigerian Bar. He obtained a Master of Laws degree in 2006 from the University of Jos.

Ajulo is also an adjunct lecturer at Adekunle Ajasin University, Akungba-Akoko, Ondo State and Egalitarian Basic Studies Institute, Kumasi, Ghana. In 2013, he was appointed the chairman of the board of Radiovision Corporation by the Governor of Ondo State.

== Career ==
Ajulo was conferred with the rank of Senior Advocate of Nigeria (equivalent to King Counsel in United Kingdom) by the Chief Justice of Nigeria in 2023.

He is the Attorney General and Commissioner for Justice of Ondo State.

Previously, Ajulo was a Labour Party candidate for the FCT senate seat held on 9 April 2011.

On 7 April 2011, it was reported that Ajulo had been abducted by armed men. This caused the Abuja workers led by the Nigeria Labour Congress to boycott the election. In a statement by the leadership of the Nigeria Labour Congress (NLC) Abuja council, all workers and affiliates across the territory were directed to boycott the National Assembly election 16 hours before the election across the country over the abduction of Kayode Ajulo.

Before the 2015 Nigeria general elections, Ajulo was National Secretary of the Labour Party, and in 2019 was confirmed as the Mayegun Aare Onakakanfo of Yorubaland by the Iba Gani Adams

In 2020, Ajulo was appointed as member for the Edo State Governorship Primary Election Appeal Committee in 2020. He is the Diocesan Registrar of the Anglican Communion, Church of Nigeria.

== Personal life ==
Ajulo is married with children.
