= Tunde Alabi-Hundeyin =

Nigerian television and film producer, director and screenwriter (born 1953)

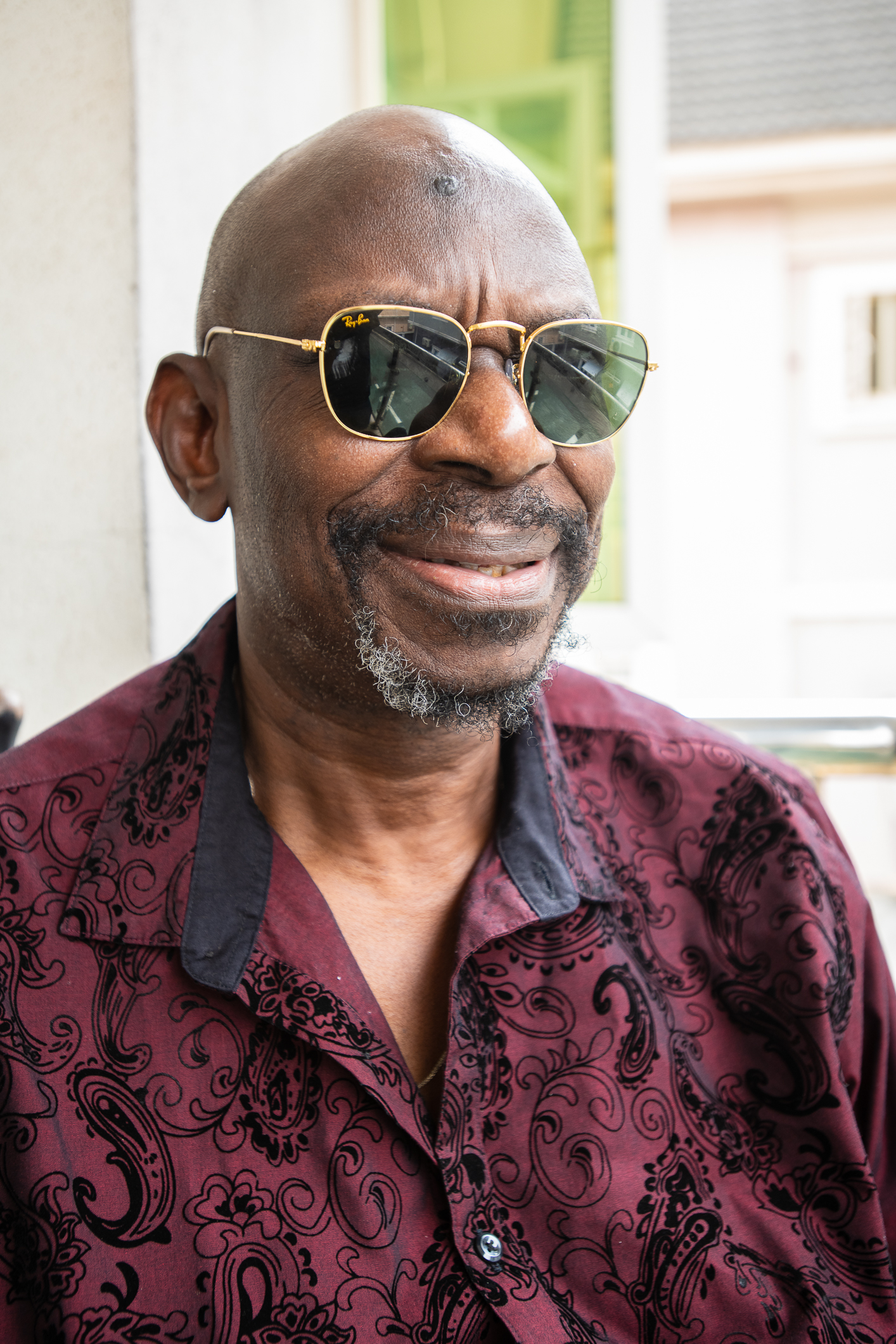
- Born: 6 June 1953 (age 73)
- Other name: Dudu
- Education: Regent University, USA; University of Ibadan, Nigeria
- Occupations: Television and film producer, director and screenwriter
- Notable work: Ireke Onibudo; Iyawo Alhaji

Tunde Alabi-Hundeyin (aka Dudu; born 6 June 1953) is a Nigerian television and film producer, director and screenwriter. He is the founder/CEO of Dudu Productions, the television production company which produced the first commercial music video in Nigeria. He has since produced a number of Nigerian music acts, including Sir Shina Peters, Sonny Okosun, Majek Fashek, Onyeka Onwenu and K1 De Ultimate. He produced and directed box office hits like Iyawo Alhaji and Ami Orun, and Ireke Onibudo, which predates Nigeria's Nollywood.

== Early life ==
Alabi-Hundeyin was born in Abeokuta to Julius Alabi Hundeyin and Anike Erinoso. He attended Comprehensive High School, Aiyetoro.} He studied political science at the University of Ibadan though he took electives from theatre arts, where he spent most of his time. He also studied for a degree in advanced television techniques at CBN University in Virginia Beach, USA (now Regent University) in 1986.

On how he got his nickname, Dudu (meaning Black), Alabi-Hundeyin noted that during a Theatre Arts lesson, Professor Abiola Irele challenged the class to become Afrocentric and a unique version of themselves.

"So, after we left, I felt like somebody just hit my head with a hammer. It was from that day that I decided that I would be Dudu. That I will be myself. I will interpret life in my own way and do things that make sense to me."

He thereafter changed from wearing suits to wearing 'adire' attires. This encounter will later transcend into his craft and approach to filmmaking.

== Career ==
Alabi-Hundeyin began acting in 1974. He played the role of Agbako in Langbodo written by Chief Wale Ogunyemi.} The role earned him fame among friends and lecturers including, professor Dapo Adelugba, Kole Omotosho and Sumbo Marinho. During his mandatory National Youth Service in Rivers State, he led the state's musical department to the Second World Black and African Festival of Arts and Culture (FESTAC 77) in Lagos. He played the role of Agbako again in the National Troupe's performance of Langbodo during the festival.

=== Television ===
After graduation from University of Ibadan, Alabi-Hundeyin was employed as one of the seven pioneer staff at Ogun State Television (OGTV) in 1981, having been transferred from the state Ministry of Information as a cultural officer, where he was part of the team that drafted Nigeria's cultural policy in the late 1970s. He rose to become the controller of programmes, produced and directed several dramas under OGTV's Telly Drama weekly episodes, including Ireke Onibudo (1983), written by D. O. Fagunwa on 35-mm film. In 1989, he resigned to start Dudu Productions.

=== Music videos ===
He produced his first music video for Terra Kota, the pioneer reggae artist in Nigeria, in 1987. In 1989, he was approached by Dean Disi, a PR manager, to produce a music video for CBS Records, which later became Sony Music. He produced Sir Shina Peters' Ace album, regarded as the first commercial music video in Nigeria.

- Sir Shina Peters (Ace, Shinamania, Dancing Time, and Experience)
- Majek Fashek (I & I Experience)
- Mike Okri (Concert Fever and Rhumba Dance)
- Funmi Adams (All We Need is Love)
- Adewale Ayuba (Mr Johnson Play for Me, Buggle D, and Acceleration).

Alabi-Hundeyin later produced for Polygram Records/Premier Music and EMI/Ivory Music. Other artistes he worked with include Ras Kimono, Orits Wiliki, Evi Edna Ogholi, Christy Essien Igbokwe, Sonny Okosun, The Mandators, K1 De Ultimate, Sikiru Ayinde Barrister, Onyeka Onwenu, Alex O, Peterside Ottong and Blackky. His work influenced the iconography of an entire generation of reggae, pop, jùjú and fuji music in the 1990s entertainment industry in Nigeria.

=== Film ===
In 1983, at the age of 30, he directed Ireke Onibudo produced by Bayo Aderohunmu's Benton Films and starring Akin Ogungbe, a veteran actor, making him one of the youngest Nigerians to have filmed on celluloid. In this period of the Nigerian film industry, only three directors had made celluloid films (Ola Balogun - Ajani Ogun; Ija Ominira; Orun Mooru; and Aiye, Hubert Ogunde and Freddie Goode - Jaiyesimi & Aropin N'Tenia).

It was reported that the best scene he ever filmed was in Ireke Onibudo. Charles Olumo (Agbako) who played Olodumare (the Voice of Wisdom) in Ireke Onibudo, had climbed a very steep hill in a jungle for a low angle silhouette shot, while Tunde Kelani, the cinematographer, and Alabi-Hundeyin had set up the camera by 5 am at the foot of the hill. By sunrise, the actor, wearing a long white robe with a dropping white beard, spread out his arms in the air while off-camera the production manager, Segun Akpata, and the art director, Pat Nebo, threw up white doves behind him. The doves rose up behind Olodumare, all flying around and away until one flew around his head and descended on his outstretched hand. The scene was so heavenly that it elicited a standing ovation every time at the cinemas.

"Benton's celluloid rehash of Ireke Onibudo, under the direction of Tunde Alabi-Hundeyin, was a huge success and indeed a further pointer to the possibilities of locally produced films," argues Tunde Adegbola, a scholar. Jonathan Haynes, professor of English at Long Island University in Brooklyn says, "Tunde Alabi-Hundeyin's direction has flair…. He uses the full gamut of cinematic techniques and uses them expressively…."

In 1994, he produced Iyawo Alhaji which starred Jide Kosoko, Toun Oni, Alade Aromire and K1 De Ultimate), which was a box office hit at the cinemas between 1994 and 1996 when it was released into the home video market. During public holidays, it attracted large crowds of people who thronged, pushed and attacked one another just to see the film on the big screen. It was the first Nigerian film to gross one million naira in ticket sales at the National Arts Theatre, the largest and most prestigious cinema in Nigeria at the time. Iyawo Alhaji was the first commercial video film to be censored by the newly established Nigerian Film and Video Censors Board (NFVCB) in 1994. It was a regular practice for Alabi-Hundeyin's films, including his next, Ami Orun (1996) (starring Sola Fosudo, Clarion Chukwura-Abiola), to have extended days at the film theatre as crowds could not get tickets to watch during the initially advertised dates. He directed Abiona (1996), produced by Rolake Odetoyinbo, and Lagbondoko (1997), produced by Kayode Soyinka and starring Dele Odule.

== Politics ==
In 2000, Alabi-Hundeyin made a foray into politics, joining the Alliance for Democracy, and won an election as the chairman of Badagry local government in 2002.

== Family ==
Alabi-Hundeyin is married with five sons (Tunde II, Lekan, Tope, Sola, and Bolu) and a daughter (Sessi).

== Awards ==
- Best Music Video (Mike Okri's "Rhumba Dance") - Nigerian Music Awards (NMA) 1991
- Best Music Video (Orits Wiliki's "Heart of Stone") - Nigerian Music Awards (NMA) 1992
- Sony Music Awards, 1996
- Fame Music Awards (FMA); 1996, 1997
- The Movie Awards (THEMA), 1997
- Music Video of the Year (Sonny Okosun's "Save Our Souls"), 1999
- Distinguished Veteran Award, Nollywood at 20 Award, 2013
