= Rymzo =

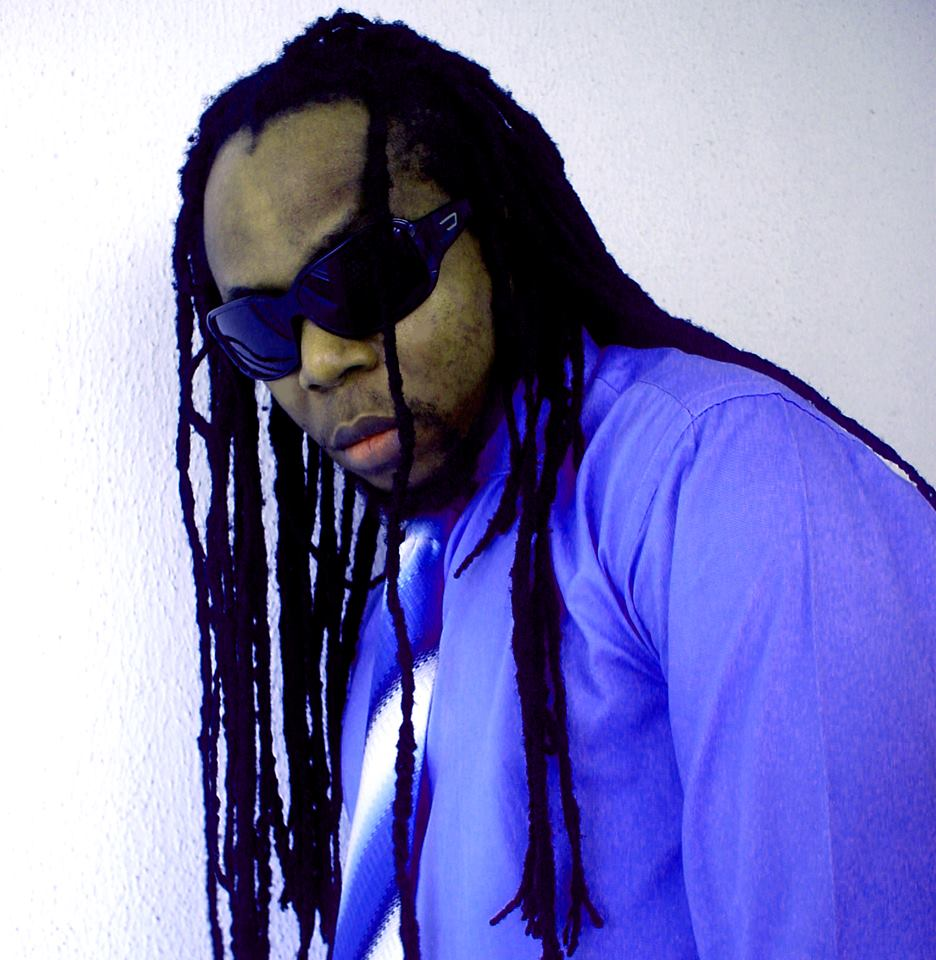

Background information
- Also known as: The Roaring Lion
- Born: Churchill Sosa De Gusto; Churchill Sosa De Gusto. April 23, 1974 (age 52)
- Origin: Lagos, Nigeria
- Genres: Reggae, Soul Reggae, Dancehall
- Occupations: Singer, songwriter, record producer, entrepreneur
- Instruments: Vocals, keyboard, guitar, drums, bass guitar.
- Years active: 1999–present
- Label: Dubplate Inc
- Formerly of: The Vintage Band
- Website: http://www.rymzo.com

Churchill Sosa De Gusto (born April 23, 1974 in Lagos State), known professionally as Rymzo, is a Nigerian recording artist and music producer. His music is influenced by artists including Fela Anikulapo-Kuti, Jimi Hendrix, U-Roy, I-Roy, Bob Marley, Naughty by Nature, Kool Moe Dee, Shabba Ranks, Tiger, Cocoa Tea, Capleton, and Joe Higgs.

== Music career ==
Rymzo first gained recognition performing at live music cafes as a lead vocalist of The Vintage Band, a rock and reggae band in Nigeria's Niger-Delta region in the early 1990s. The band metamorphosed from The Difference Jazz Band. They won the maiden edition of the Benson and Hedges regional "Grab the Mic" contest in Benin City, with Rymzo, then known as "Coolrymes" as lead singer and band leader.

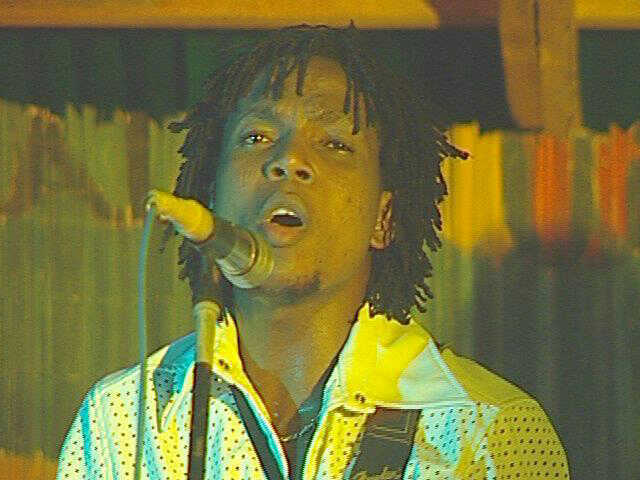
Rymzo performing at a music café in 1999.

Rymzo produced his first album Take Mediocre Off The Stage in 2005. It included the hit single "Rock n Roll" which had nationwide chart success in 2004 prior to the album release. His second album Mysterious was released in 2006.

As a producer, Rymzo has worked or performed in various musical projects, radio commercials for individuals and companies, media station IDs and has also worked in collaboration or as a producer with several Nigerian music artists such as Tunde and Wunmi Obe, Segun Obe, Kefee, Goldie, Sunny Neji, Muma Gee, Sammy Okposo, Charly Boy, Sound Sultan, Lady D, Orits Wiliki, Ras Kimono, Felix Duke, Oritshe Femi and Da grin, Ruggedman, Nomoreloss, Mr Kool, 2face Idibia, Omotola Jalade Ekeinde, Freestyle, Da tribe, Francis Goldman, and Modele.

Rymzo tours with his eight-man band, The 12 Tribes, and has performed on the same stage as reggae artiste including Steel Pulse, Anthony B, Capleton, 2face Idibia, P Square, Morgan Heritage, Victor Essiet (The Mandators), Majek Fashek, General Levy, Alpha Blondy, Maxi Priest, and Shaggy.

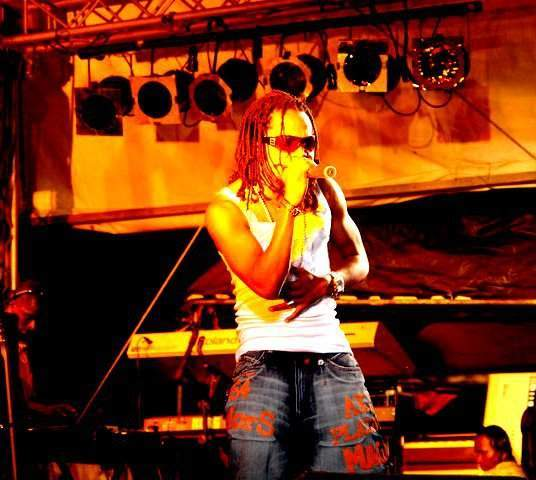
Rymzo in a Live performance in 2010

Rhymzo's album Take Mediocre Off The Stage helped sustain the reggae genre in Nigeria following the decline of reggae musicians of the 1980s and 1990s, such as Majek Fashek.
