= Nigerian reggae =

Music genre

== Background ==
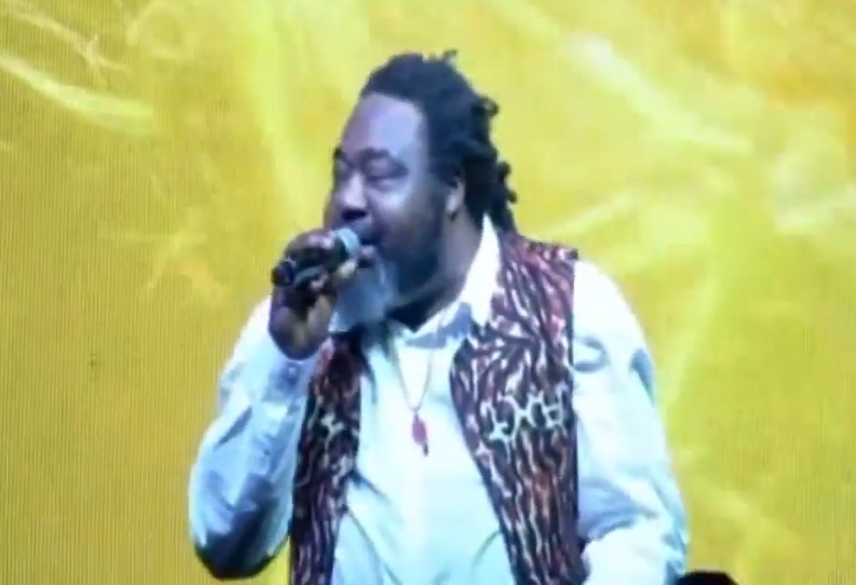
Veteran Nigerian Reggae artist Ras Kimono

Nigerian reggae is a style of raggae-fusion that evolved in the late 1960s, and later became a major part of the music of Nigeria, especially after the rise of singer Majek Fashek. Fashek was a member of the long-running band Jah Stix, along with Ras Kimono and Amos McRoy.

One of the notable musicians from this genre is Daniel Wilson (AKA Mr. Ragamuffinwik) who introduced his brand of ragamuffin music to Nigeria. Daniel Wilson dazzled the Nigerian music scene with hits like "Mr.Ragamuffin" and "Original Bad Boy". Other musicians include Jerri Jheto, Daddy Showkey, Ras Kimono, Rymzo, De king, the high school band of Victor Essiet and Peggy Umanna, The Mandators, and the London-based MC Afrikan Simba. These pioneers of reggae music include big names like Orits Williki, Peterside Ottong, Andy Shoreman, Alex Zitto, Evelyn Ogoli, Wale Man, and Isaac Black, among others, who paved the way for the new generation of homegrown reggae artists.

== Nigerian reggae music in the '80s ==
Reggae music was propelled into the mainstream Nigerians in the mid-eighties. During this period, radio stations were a viable medium for many recording artists and record label executives. In print and electronic media, the artists promoted a different kind of music to Nigerian demography. Some of these stations included Radio Nigeria 1 Ikoyi, Lagos, Radio Nigeria 2 Lagos on Martin Street, Lagos Island, and Radio Nigeria 3 Ikoyi, Lagos, in 1987. They began and frequently hit the airwaves with this new music genre that took Nigerians by storm.

Jah Stix disbanded in 1987, Fashek, rebranded from Raji Canal to Majek Fashek and was signed to Tabansi Records, where he began a solo career with the release of his debut album, Prisoner of Conscience and quickly became Nigeria’s top reggae artiste after the song "Send Down The Rain" became the most popular song of the year, and in 1989 he won six Performing Musicians Association of Nigeria awards for Song of the Year, Album of the Year, and Reggae Artist of the Year among others.

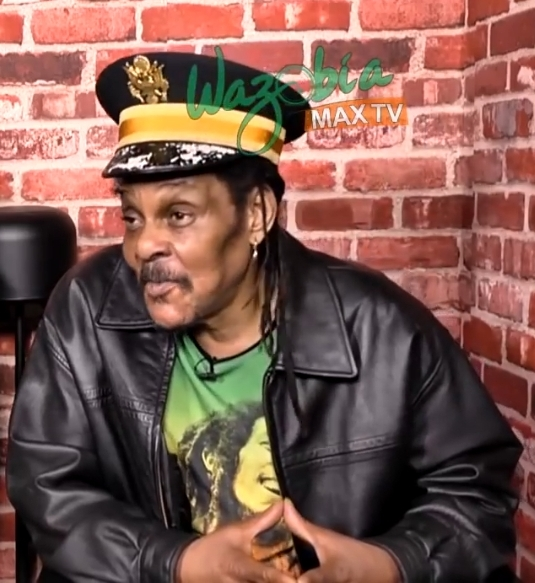
Majek Fashek sporting a Bob Marley t-shirt

== Nigerian reggae music in the 2000s ==
As the years have progressed, so has the face of reggae music in Nigeria. Contemporary artists are fusing styles like hip hop, R&B, and dance hall with reggae. Blending styles that borrow influences from reggae traditions; artists such as Buju Banton, Winning Jah and Benny Paladin expanded the definition of Nigerian-born reggae artists, maintaining the trends of reggae music. Global Nigerian artist Burna Boy's music has been influenced by reggae music. In 2019, he released the song, "Different" (featuring Damian Marley and Angelique Kidjo) on the album African Giant.

== Connection to Jamaican roots ==
Similar to the political underpinnings of other popular Nigerian artists making music in the 1980's such as Fela Kuti, the Nigerian reggae music scene was also political. Majek Fashek's music was highly political. Reggae music has its roots in spirituality, social, economic and political empowerment, Afrocentrism, and anti-colonial critique. Victor Essiet and The Mandators' music also discussed political topics in songs such as "Inflation", "Dem Belly Full (But We Hungry)", "Things Fall Apart", and "Politicians I and II". The Mandators' 1994 album Power of the People: Nigerian Reggae is composed entirely of songs with political underpinnings.

The trend of socially conscious music has been continued by artists such as Daddy Showkey, who vocally criticized the Nigerian government in his song “Fire Fire”. The song became something close to a national anthem at the time. He has continued to be an activist for social reform and a loud voice in organising anti-government protests. Burna Boy's music also tackles the symptoms of Nigeria’s dysfunction such as the embezzlement by the political class and police brutality.
