= Olu Aboderin =

Nigerian journalist

- Born: James Olubunmi Aboderin; 3 September 1934 (age 91); Ibadan, Oyo State, Nigeria
- Citizenship: Nigeria
- Occupation: Journalist
- Years active: 1961 - 1984
- Known for: The Punch

Olu Aboderin (3 September 1934 – 28 February 1984) was a Nigerian newspaper publisher who was a co-founder of The Punch of Nigeria and was the president of the Newspaper Proprietors’ Association of Nigeria until his death in 1984. He was also a trained accountant who left the National Bank of Nigeria as its chief accountant. The Punch newspaper is the most widely read newspaper in Nigeria. He established The Punch with the founder of Vanguard newspaper, Sam Amuka-Pemu, on 1 November 1976.

He was a lover of arts and a patron of the Performing Musicians Association of Nigeria.

== Life ==
Aboderin was born to the family of James Oyebode and Janet Aboderin in Ibadan. From 1941 to 1944, he attended a Native Authority primary school in Oranyan, Ibadan before proceeding to Ibadan Grammar School. At grammar school, he enjoyed playing soccer, a passion that continued after secondary school. He finished his secondary education studies by passing the A-level. In the mid-1950s, he traveled to London and studied history at Northwestern Polytechnic. While in the city, he took the Institute of Chartered Accountants exam and was admitted into the institute in May 1964. During this period, he worked as a clerk with a firm in Brighton, Sussex, and from 1963 to 1964, he worked with the firm of Bradley, Lytton & Co, an accounting firm in Moorgate, London. He returned to Nigeria in 1964 and gained employment with the firm of Pannell Fitzpatrick & Co, chartered accountants. He joined the National Bank of Nigeria in 1967 and was an accountant with the bank during the Nigerian Civil War. During this period, the bank operated in many liberated towns and established an offshore branch. He also served on the boards of a few regional government owned parastatals such as West African Pictures, Nigeria Spinning Company, and General Insurance. He resigned as Chief Accountant of the bank in 1971 and went into private business.

He started a few business ventures, including a travel agency and Feedwell Nigeria Ltd. In 1976, he established The Punch newspaper. Originally starting it as a Sunday newspaper, he brought new ideas of operations to the firm. The Punch expanded into the Daily Punch, Sunday Punch, Happyhome magazine, and Top Life magazine.

== Death ==
He died in the Princess Grace Hospital, in London. Before his death, he issued a press statement defending Haroun Adamu, a jailed journalist as the head of the newspaper proprietors association in Nigeria. Right towards the end of 1983, his newspaper was very critical of the administration of Shehu Shagari.

He held the traditional Ibadan title of Ashipa Parakoyi of Ibadan.
