= Onwenu =

Onwenu is a surname. Notable people with the surname include:

- D. K. Onwenu (died 1956), Nigerian teacher and politician
- Michael Onwenu (born 1997), American football player
- Onyeka Onwenu (1952–2024), Nigerian singer/songwriter, actress, and activist
