= Lemmy Jackson =

Nigerian music producer

Otu Udofa, professionally known as Lemmy Jackson, is a Nigerian music producer who produced songs for many prominent Nigerians artists of the 1980s. He produced "Wait for Me" a duet by Onyeka Onwenu and King Sunny Adé. He also worked with Alex O, the Mandators, Tera Kota and Ras Kimono.

== Life ==
Jackson was educated at QIC Primary School, Eket and at the Etinan Institute. He later studied metallurgy in Russia before moving to England. In London, Jackson worked as a session musician, an encounter with Laolu Akins and his band BLO led to him playing as a keyboardist for BLO. His career took off in 1981 after he was hired as an in-house producer by Pail Aifuwa, a businessman who had founded the record label, Time Communications in Lagos. At Time Communications, he produced Oby Onyioha's record I Want To Feel Your Love and also Tonight, Jackson's debut album. In addition, Jackson performed production duties on Christy Essien-Igbokwe's Ever Liked My Person. Both his record and Onyioha's were recorded at Haruna Isbola's Phondisk Studio in Ijebu-Ode and as was common at the time, were sent to London for mixing.

Jackson later joined EMI and began producing reggae records. He was a session musician and producer on Ras Kimono's What's Gwan? and produced Tera Kota's Lamentation of Sodom in 1984. He also contributed to the production of the Mandators' third album Rebel and also produced Majek Fashek's "Send Down the Rain".
