= Angela Emuwa =

Nigerian media executive

- Olufunmilayo
- Status: Active
- Other names: Olufunmilayo
- Citizenship: Nigerian
- Education: ESUT Business School
- Occupations: Media executive, Journalist
- Organization: Punch Media Foundation
- Predecessor: Gbadebowale Aboderin
- Father: Chief Olu Aboderin

Angela Olufunmilayo Emuwa is a Nigerian media executive and journalist. She is the chair of Punch Media Foundation, appointed by the Board of Punch Nigeria Limited in June 2018 after the death of her brother, Gbadebowale Wayne Aboderin, on May 30, 2018. Before her appointment as the chair, she joined the board in 1994 and functioned as a non-executive director of the company.

== Biography ==
Emuwa is a Nigerian journalist. She is the daughter of Olu Aboderin. Before her journey in Punch Media Foundation, Emuwa had vast experience in the media space as she held various positions at the Newswatch Communications Limited between 1986 and 1995 and was also the advertising sales director at Africa Today, 1995-1999 and Head of Operations at News Africa 2000–2003. Emuwa is an advocate for children living with disabilities and the President of Autism Parents Association International, APAI, formerly known as Parents Against Autism Initiative, PAAI. She is also an advocate against climate change. She is the collaborator of The Dawn Project through which she has led efforts to combat the impact of climate change in Nigeria and led the planting of over 250 trees in Lagos.

== Awards ==
In 2019, Angela Emuwa was honoured with awards at the Great Place To Work (GPTW) Annual Awards Ceremony & Dinner and Maiden Edition of the Women Leaders Awards. She was recognised as one of the Distinguished Women Leaders.
