= Christy Essien-Igbokwe =

Nigerian actress and musician (1960–2011)

Chief Christy Essien-Igbokwe MFR FICA
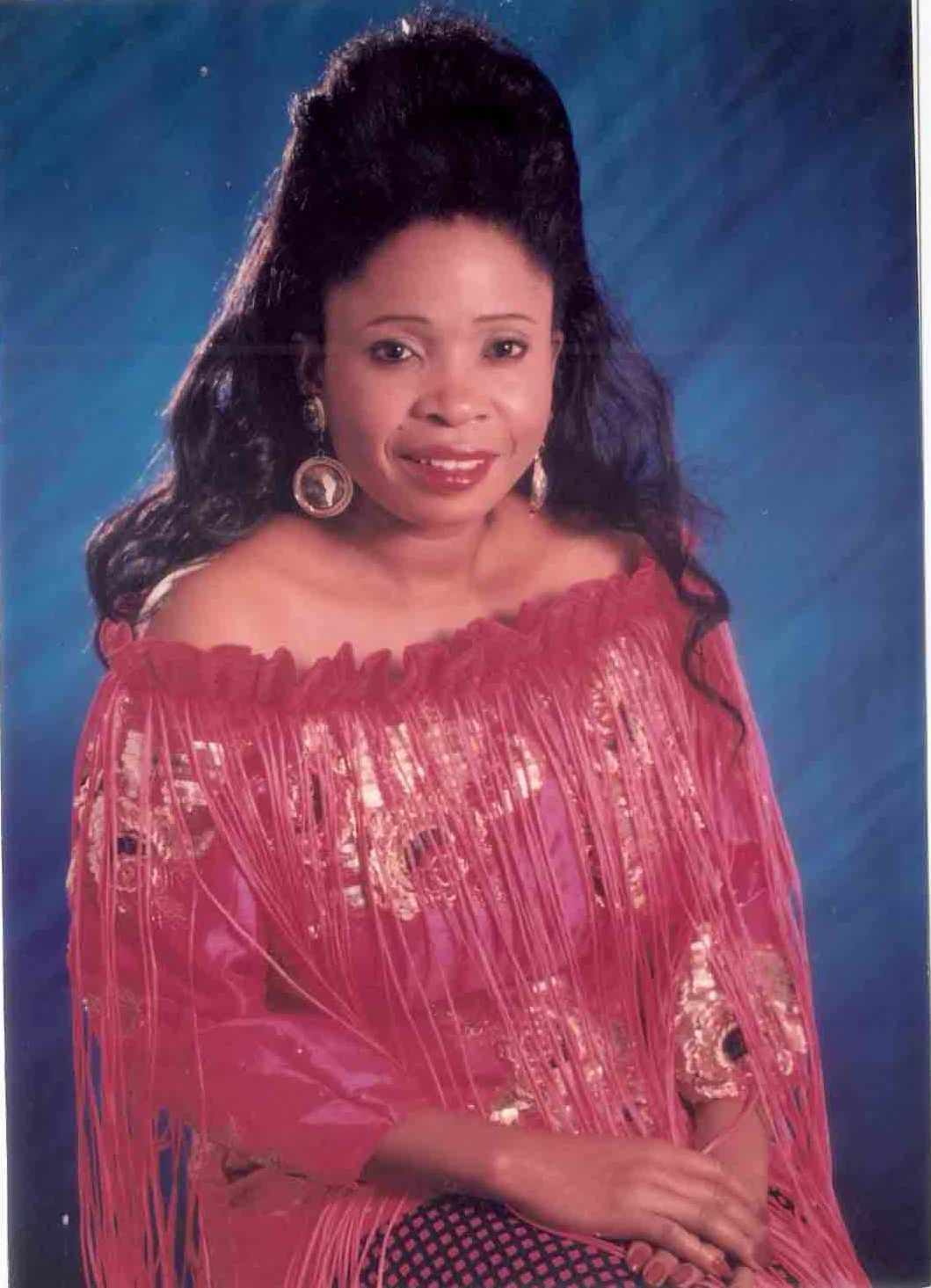

Background information
- Also known as: Nigeria's Lady of Songs; Akpenu; Mummy Seun Rere; Adiaha Onna; Akwa Ikwo Eket; Aha Nwanyi Ejiagamba 1
- Born: Christiana Uduak Essien; 11 November 1960; Akwa Ibom State, Nigeria
- Died: 30 June 2011 (aged 50) Lagos, Nigeria
- Genres: R&B; soul; highlife
- Occupations: Singer-songwriter; actress
- Instrument: Vocals
- Years active: 1970–2011
- Labels: Apex; Soultrain
- Formerly of: Onyeka Onwenu; Fela Kuti; Sonny Okosun; Sunny Ade
- Website: Website

Christiana Uduak Essien-Igbokwe, MFR (11 November 1960 – 30 June 2011) was a Nigerian musician and actress. Dubbed "Nigeria's Lady of Songs," she was known for her the hit tracks "Seun Rere", "Tete Nu Na Ula", "Ife", "Hear the Call", and "Give Me a Chance". She was the first female president of the Performing Musicians Association of Nigeria (PMAN) and the chairperson and managing director of Soul Train Entertainment.

Essien-Igbokwe sang in Igbo, Ibibio, Efik, Hausa, Yoruba, and English. Her native language is Ibibio.

== Early life ==
Christy was born in Okat, Onna, Akwa Ibom State. Her mother died when she was 12; she then lived in Aba, Abia, with a friend of her mother, who encouraged her singing career and bought her a second-hand cassette player to record her songs.

== Career ==
Christy began her musical career in secondary school, singing at clubs such as Unikoko in Aba. She appeared as a regular on the NTA Aba variety shows Now Sound and Ukaonu's Club. In 1976, she joined the cast of The New Masquerade as Akpenor, the wife of the cantankerous character Jegede Sokoya (Claude Eke). She released her debut album (Freedom) the following year. Essien's most successful album was 1981's Ever Liked My Person? (produced by Lemmy Jackson).

Christy is known for her feminist activism, as she appeared in early Nollywood films such as Flesh and Blood (co-starring with Richard Mofe-Damijo, Ameze Imarhiagbe, and Ekpeyong Bassey Inyang; directed by Chico Ejiro) and Scars of Womanhood (co-starring Kate Henshaw, Sam Loco Efe, Justus Esiri, and Francis Duru), both of which addressed child abuse and female circumcision.

Essien initiated the first meeting, which formed the Performing Musicians Association of Nigeria (PMAN) in 1981. The association was founded a year later, with King Sunny Adé as president, Sonny Okosun as vice-president, and Essien as treasurer. From 1996 to 1999, she was the PMAN's first female president. Essien has appeared in many national and international shows, and she has composed and performed Akwa Ibom State's informal anthem, "Akwa Ibom Mmi (My Akwa Ibom)", in 1987. Christy Essien Igbokwe released 10 albums between 1977 and 1992, with the eleventh still unreleased after her death until 2013.

In her later years, she performed with her second son, Chinwuba Kenechukwu Kaka, at the January 2009 Inspire Africa benefit concert and participated in the MTN Musical Festival later that year. Chinwuba Kenechukwu Kaka is a hip-hop artist and producer and the father of her granddaughter Christiana Chizaramekpeleamaka Ijeoma. Essien's album, Ever Liked My Person?, was certified platinum in Nigeria. A biography titled "The Will of God" was produced and sponsored by Exxon Mobil in the 90s to show her life and career so far at the time. Her granddaughter remixes the song "Seun Rere".

== Death ==
Essien-Igbokwe died of gastrointestinal disease on 30 June 2011 at age 50 at Lagos State University Teaching Hospital. Former Lagos State Governor Babatunde Fashola, Onyeka Owenu, Bisi Olatilo (Veteran Broadcaster), Soni Irabor, Oritz Wiliki, Remi Tinubu, Goodluck Ebele Jonathan, Aliko Dangote, and Victor Uwaifo attended her funeral, amongst others. To celebrate the remembrance of the late music icon on 30 June 2020, the granddaughter of Christy Essien Igbokwe, "Christiana Chizaramekpeleamaka Ijeoma" covered "You're Welcome" from Disney's "Moana".

== Awards and honours ==
=== International awards ===
1. "Silver Prize" Winner at 6th Seoul Songs Festival, South Korea – 1983
2. "Grand Prix " Winner at Neewollah Music Festival at Independence, Kansas, U.S. – 1983
3. "International Special Achievement" Award of MUSEXPO, Acapulco, Mexico, 1983
4. "Certificate of Merit" Award for Song writing and composing at the 10th Annual American
5. Songs Festival, Los Angeles, U.S. – 1983
6. "Audience Favourite" Award of International Music Festival at Baker University, U.S. – 1983
7. "Silver Prize" Winner at Second International Music Festival of Oklahoma University, U.S. – 1983
8. "Outstanding Performance" Award at the World Song Festival, L.A. Arts Academy, U.S. – 1984
9. "Distant Accord" Award at the FIDOF Festival in Hollywood, L.A., U.S. – 1990
10. Honorary Doctorate Degree (Honoris Causa) Award in Business Management by
11. Cornerstone University & Theological Seminary, Jerusalem, Israel – 2010
12. Honorary Doctorate Degree (Honoris Causa) Award in Literature-in-Africa the by University of
13. Berkley, Chicago, Illinois, U.S. – 2010

=== National awards ===
1. "Lady of Songs" by Nigerian Entertainment Writers – 1980
2. "Star Performer" Award of Nigerian Television Authority (NTA) – 1983
3. "Best Actress Runner-Up" Award for Excellence by silver Jubilee Committee of the Nigerian Television Organization of Nigeria (NTA) – 1984
4. "African Music Mother" Award by Music Extravaganza'84 in collaboration with African Music Development, New York, U.S.
5. "Adaha Onna" (Pillar of Onna LGA)
6. Akwa Ikwo Eket (The Greatest Singer from Eket Community) by Eket LGA Authority
7. Aha Nwanyi Ejiagamba 1 of Oru Ahiazu, Mbaise, Imo State
8. "Golden Voice of Africa" Award by music Students Association, Obafemi Awolowo University, Ile-Ife
9. "Gold Award" of 25 Nigerian Celebrities – 1988
10. "Certificate of Honour" by the Nigerian Union of Journalists, Anambra State Council – 1990
11. "Certificate of Recognition" by National Film Festival – 1992
12. "Service to the Music Profession" Award by PMAN the on platform of NIGERIAN MUSIC AWARD (to Christy Essien Igbokwe/Edwin Igbokwe) for their efforts in forming and creating PMAN – 1988
13. Special Musical Patents Decoration Award – 1994
14. "Merit Award for Excellence in the Field of Music Therapy" by Medical Association of Nigeria
15. "Award of Honour" by Nigeria Institute of Journalism Student's Union, Ibadan Campus
16. "Certificate of Honour" in recognition of her role as a woman of substance and her excellent performance in musical entertainment by the National Association of Akwa Ibom Students, University of Ibadan chapter.
17. "Grand Fellow of Nigerian Youths" by the Nigerian Youth Organization
18. "Queen of Music International" Award by the Association of Nigerian Theatre Arts Practitioners, Lagos State, and Degbola International Promotions – 1996
19. "Outstanding Achievements Uplifting Female" Award by Youth Re-Orientation Movement – 1996
20. "Merit Award in Honour of Care for the Nigerian Child" by Broadway International School – 2000
21. "Award of Excellence and Outstanding Leadership Qualities" as PMAN first Female President – 1998
22. "The Best Dressed Female Musician" Award in the Patriotic Dress category at the Nigeria Fashion Show – 1997
23. "Member of the Greatest Performers" Award in recognition of her immense contribution to the development and reformation of the world youths – 1996
24. "Award of Excellence" as Matron of the Great Eni-Njoku Hall (University of Lagos chapter) – 2000
25. "Pacesetter Award" in recognition of her vision, initiator and organizer of the First ECOWAS Cultural and Musical Festival & the Entertainment Award – 1997
26. "Lover of Children" Award in recognition of her contribution towards child social and welfare development in society – by legendary Page Boys Club (Socio-Cultural & Humanitarian Club)
27. "Member of the Order of the Federal Republic (MFR) by Federal Government of Nigeria – 1999
28. "Defender of Children" Award by Interclassic Youth Forum (a non-governmental organization)
29. "Outstanding Achievement in Entertainment Industry" Award by Top Celebrities Magazine – 2010
30. "Merit Award for African Heritage" by The Gong African News Magazine – 2010
31. "Honorary Fellowship Award" by Institute of Corporate & Business Affairs Management, Nigeria.
32. "Nigerian Woman of Valor" Award by National Centre for Women Development, Abuja – 2010.

=== Extra positions and awards ===
1. Matron; Eni-Njoku Hall, University of Lagos
2. Matron; Akwa Ibom Journalists Forum, Kaduna
3. Matron; National Association of Akwa Ibom Students, University of Port Harcourt
4. Matron; Nigerian Youth Tourist Organization
5. Matron; National Association of Akwa Ibom Students, University of Lagos
6. Matron; Association of Beauty Therapy & Cosmetology of Nigeria, Lagos
7. Matron; Worldwide Twins and Multiple Foundation
8. Deputy Vice President/Vice Chairman, Governing Council of Institute of Corporate and Business Affairs Management, Nigeria.
9. Entertainment Icon" by West African Women in Leadership Conference (in Ghana) – 2011
10. "Excellence in Outstanding Performance & Hard Work" by National Association of Akwa Ibom State Students (NAAKISS) – University of Lagos Chapter – 2011
11. NOPA 2012 for outstanding contribution to the entertainment industry
12. Essien-Igbokwe was known as "Lady of Songs". On 11 November 2018, what would have been her 58th birthday, Google commemorated her life with a doodle.
13. "Award of Excellence" by Ibom Talent Development Center 11 June 2021

== Discography ==
- Freedom (1977)
- Patience (1978)
- Time Waits For No One (1978)
- One Understanding (1979)
- Give Me A Chance (1980)
- Ever Liked My Person? (1981)
- It's Time (1982)
- Taking My Time (1986)
- Hear The Call (1990)
- Mysteries of Life (1992)
- All of a Sudden (2013)
