= Mohammed Idris Malagi =

Nigerian publisher and politician (born 1966)

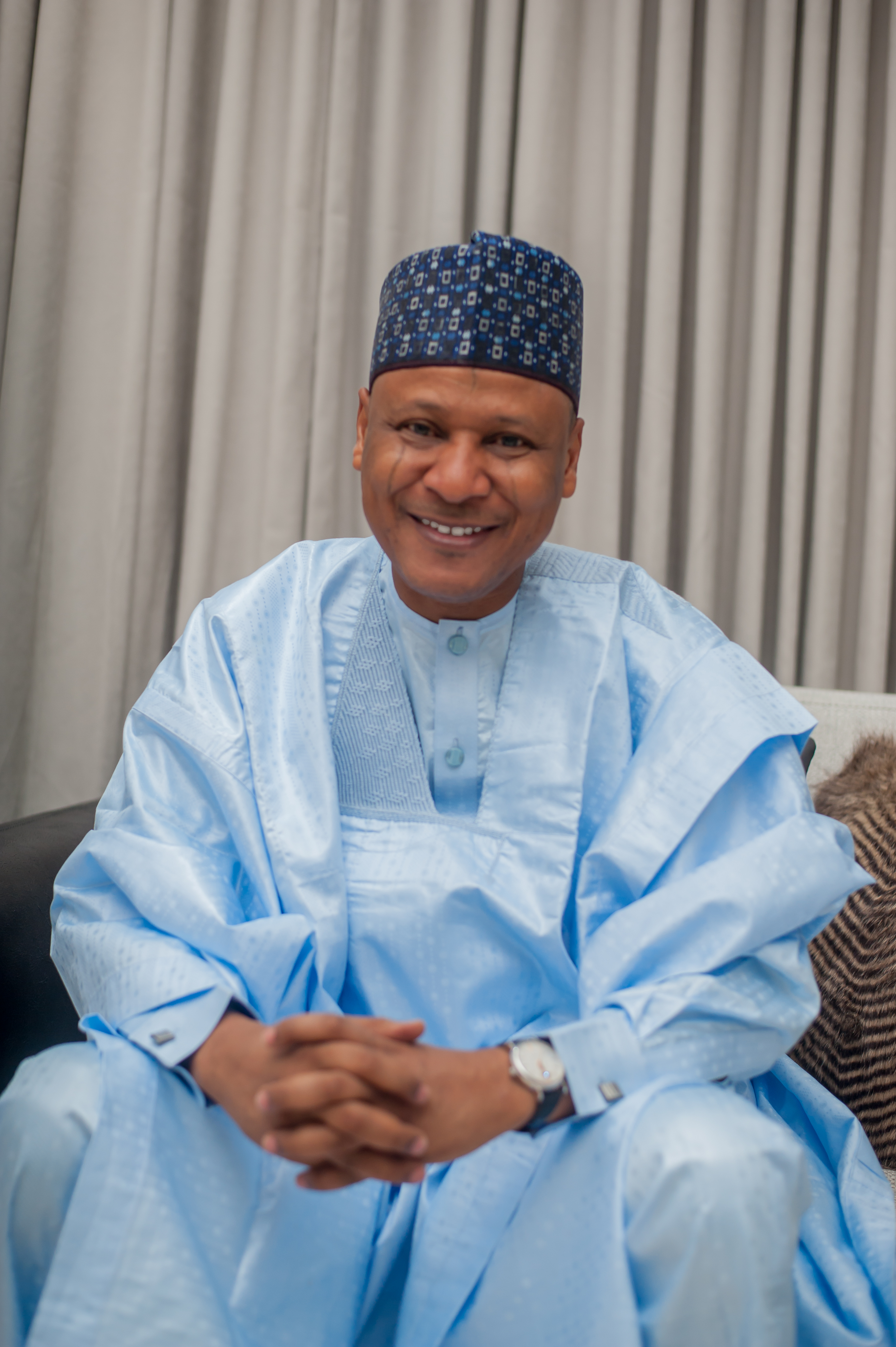

Minister of Information and National Orientation
- Incumbent
- Assumed office 21 August 2023
- President: Bola Tinubu
- Preceded by: Lai Mohammed

Personal details
- Born: Mohammed Idris; 2 May 1966 (age 60) Gbako, Northern Region (now in Niger State), Nigeria
- Party: All Progressives Congress
- Education: Usmanu Danfodiyo University; Bayero University Kano
- Occupation: Newspaper publisher; politician
- Known for: Founder/chairman and publisher of Blueprint

Mohammed Idris popularly known as Malagi (born 2 May 1966) is a Nigerian publisher, philanthropist, entrepreneur, public relations professional and politician who is the Minister of Information and National Orientation of Nigeria. He was appointed by President Bola Tinubu in August 2023. He is the founder/chairman and publisher of Blueprint. He is also the chairman of Abuja based Kings Broadcasting Limited, owners of WE 106.5 FM Abuja, Nigeria. He was the general secretary of Newspaper Proprietors' Association of Nigeria. Additionally, he held the position of Director of Strategic Communications for the All Progressives Congress Tinubu-Shettima Presidential Campaign Council.

== Early life and education ==
Mohammed Idris was born on 2 May 1966 in Gbako local government area of Niger State. He had his primary education in Kontagora between 1971 and 1977. He then proceeded to GSS Rijau in 1977 and graduated in 1982. In 1983 he was admitted to study English studies at the Usmanu Danfodiyo University, Sokoto, where he graduated in 1987. He had his master's degree in the same discipline from Bayero University Kano in 1995.

== Career ==
In May 2011, Idris Malagi founded the Blueprint, a newspaper that publishes weekly and daily in English and Hausa language called the Manhaja. Malagis has been the chairman and chief executive officer since its inception. He is also the founder and chairman of Bifocal Group. In December 2020, he was elected general secretary of Newspaper Proprietors' Association of Nigeria. On 27 November, 2019, he took over ownership of Kings Broadcasting Network, owners of WE 106.5 FM Abuja.

== Political career ==
Mohammed Idris Malagi, as a member of the All Progressives Congress was a governorship aspirant in Niger State for the 2023 Nigerian general election. He polled 154 votes and lost to a member of the House of Representatives, Umar Bago who polled 386 votes. He was appointed the Director of Strategic Communications for the Asiwaju Bola Ahmed Tinubu Presidential Campaign Council (PCC).

== Awards and recognitions ==
Alhaji Mohammed Idris Malagi holds the traditional title of Kakaaki Nupe, a title bestowed on him by Yahaya Abubakar, the Etsu Nupe. The title recognized his philanthropy and personal accomplishments in the media and public relations space. On 8 December 2022, he was awarded the Milestone Recognition Media Icons in Nigeria award by the Nigeria Union of Journalists.
