= Felix Lebarty =

Nigerian pop musician, singer, songwriter, and producer

- Also known as: Lover Boy
- Born: Edo State, Nigeria
- Occupations: Singer, musician, pastor
- Instruments: Vocals, guitar
- Labels: Tabansi, EMI Nigeria

Felix Aigbe Libarty, professionally known as Felix Lebarty also known as Lover Boy, is a Nigerian singer/songwriter and record producer, best known for the 1989 single "Ifeoma" from the One Life To Live album. He has since reinvented himself as a pastor, and currently runs his own Christian ministry.

== Music ==
Lebarty initially gained music experience with his older brother, highlife musician Aigbe Lebarty, performing as guitarist with the band Aigbe Lebarty & the Sex Bombers, and on Kris Okotie's album before embarking on his own solo career. His first release was the album Girls For Sale, but achieved his breakthrough with 1982's Lover Boy, with the title track becoming his showbiz moniker. Lebarty's music was well received in Eastern Nigeria, particularly within the Igbo community, and some of his songs were odes to Igbo women, including "Ego", "Chi-Chi", "Ada", "Uchenna", Ngozi, and "Nneka".

In 1989, a decade into his career as a recording artiste, Lebarty released the album One Life to Live which featured what would become his signature song, "Ifeoma". It would later be heard during the nightclub scene in the 2021 film Swallow despite the 1985 setting, as One Life to Live was released four years later. Following the release of his final album as a secular artist, 1992's 419, Lebarty relocated to the United States where he established a taxi firm, returning to Nigeria five years later.

== Ministry ==
Born into an African traditionalist family, Lebarty converted to Islam at the height of his fame but became a Christian in the late 90s. With the support of fellow 80s singer-turned-preacher Chris Okotie, Lebarty attended bible school in America and is now the pastor of his own ministry.

== Controversy ==
In 1987, Lebarty announced plans to undergo plastic surgery in America to remodel his face after former First Lady Maryam Babangida, claiming "In the United States, I found out that there was more to music than record making...I decided to model my face after Maryam Babangida's because her face is special. When you look at her, you see luck written all over her face." However, Lebarty abandoned the idea after his mother disapproved, and the money reserved for the procedure was used to pursue his passion as a car enthusiast.

In an interview with Vintage People, Lebarty described how then-PMAN president Tony Okoroji by persuading Lebarty's former record company EMI Nigeria to re-release his previous album Don’t Take My Girl while Lover Boy was still in circulation, causing confusion among his fans and a feud between both men. Okoroji, who denied the accusation, was also accused of ruining Dizzy K's career by failing to secure the latter a lucrative record contract. Lebarty questioned Okoroji's credibility in the music industry, stating "Tell him to bring out his guitar and I'll bring out mine. We'll play on Network television [and] find out who's better."

== Personal life ==
Lebarty, whose father died when he was 3, is the father of 19 children by seven different women. He is now legally married to Rosemary, the mother of his first four children including fashion designer/singer Ivie - the couple initially split following Lebarty's numerous affairs with other women, but reunited after he discovered Christianity. Lebarty has since expressed regret over his former lifestyle, and now preaches against polygamy and secular music.

== Discography ==
- Girls For Sale - 1979
- Don't Take My Girl (as "Felix Lebarty and the Gang") - 1979
- Felix Lebarty & Dynamite Rock (as "Felix Lebarty & Dynamite Rock") - 1979
- Lover Boy - 1982
- Lover Boy '83 (Sequel album) - 1983
- Bobo - 1984
- African Boy - 1986
- One Life To Live - 1989
- Better Be Sure - 1991
- 419 (Final secular album) - 1992
