= Jide Obi =

Nigerian music star of the 1980s (born 1962)

== Early life ==
Jide Obi Ibo (born 1962) is a Nigerian musician from the early 1980s.

Jide Obi was born in England to a Nigerian barrister of England's Lincoln Inn, and a teacher.

== Education ==
In the late 1970s he studied law at Enugu campus of the University of Nigeria, where he became friends with fellow student Chris Okotie.

== Career ==
Following Okotie's success, in the early 1980s he released his debut album "Front Page News" under the Tabansi Records label. Other hits included Kill Me With Love, and Front Page News. He made numerous performances on Nigerian radio and television.

In November 1981, his record label, Tabansi Records, gave him his first gold disc award at the National Theatre, Surulere. Two years later, he toured Eastern Nigeria with Sierra Leone's Bunny Mack, backed mostly by the Comrades of Enugu, Nigeria.

He has had several bands backing him, including Guyanese musician Eddy Grant's Coach House Band, the Dukes of Freetown Sierra Leone, and the Apostles of Aba. His albums Front Page News and Kill Me With Love were both produced by Barbados native Bill Campbell. Ex-Osibisa and Funkees guitarist Jake Solo performed on both recordings. In 1984, Obi composed the theme tune to the NTA children's show Tales By Moonlight.

With Dizzy K Falola, Chris Okotie, and Felix Lebarty he stimulated the emerging music industry of Nigeria. He sang modern pop gospel, also described as pop/blues. He was seen as part of a movement devoted to change and opposing inequality in Nigeria.

Jide Obi is known to give press interviews critical of aspects of religion. The most notable instance occurred in 1989 and 1990, when he declared religion as frequently a victimising factor. The story made the cover of Nigerian billionaire M. K. O. Abiola's National Concord magazine.

In recent years, Jide Obi has been seen living in both Britain and the United States, though he is a recluse seldom seen in public.

== Achievements ==
He made numerous performances on Nigerian radio and television. In November 1981, his record label, Tabansi Records, gave him his first gold disc award at the National Theatre, Surulere. Two years later, he toured Eastern Nigeria with Sierra Leone's Bunny Mack, backed mostly by the Comrades of Enugu, Nigeria.

== Discography ==
- Front Page News
- Kill Me With Love
- I Love This Place I Found
- Give It Everything You Have Got
- At The Disco
- Wild War
- Paperback Superstar
- No One Can Stop Us Right Now
- Everybody In The World Needs Someone
- Living In The Shadows
- Happy Day
- Too Young
- I'm Leaving Tonight
- Star Of Your Life
- Star Of My Life
- Change Your Life
- Making Friends
- Save The Children
