= Tunde and Wunmi Obe =

Nigerian musical duo

- Born: Babatunde Edward Obe, Omowunmi Valerie Aboderin
- Origin: Ondo & Ibadan - Nigeria
- Years active: 1988 till date
- Labels: Zmirage (1997); Alec Music; KopyKats Entertainment
- Website: www.tundeandwunmiobe.com

Tunde and Wunmi Obe, professionally known as T.W.O, are a Nigerian show business couple, entertainers, television personalities, and entrepreneurs. They met and began their music career as undergraduates in the 90s.

Tunde and Wunmi Obe first made an entry into the Nigerian Entertainment scene as regulars on The Charly Boy Show, a television programme in the 90s, after which they released their debut album Sealed in 1999, which was followed by T.W.O in 2003, T.W.O 4 real in 2007, T.W.O Legit in 2010 and T.W.O PLUS in 2015.

== Career ==
=== Formation and debut album ===
Wunmi Aboderin met Tunde Obe while an undergraduate at the University of Lagos (UNILAG) in 1988 where she was pursuing a degree in Philosophy. Tunde, an undergraduate of Lagos State University (LASU) was pursuing a degree in History Education. Wunmi met him when she officially joined the UNILAG band Turning Point in which Tunde was already lead singer. The two became friends. The band separated when its members graduated but Tunde and Wunmi stayed together.

They first sang as a duet in Sealed. It was a success and they decided to work on an album. T.W.O got their first recording contract from Zmirage in 1997 and their debut Album Sealed was released in 1998. The album was produced by Albert Kalu. It contained the songs "Tomorrow", "The Way", and "Jafunmi", a remake of King Sunny Adé's song.

Before Sealed was released, T.W.O had featured on The Charly Boy Show for about six years while Tunde had featured in a few Nigerian movies. At this time, they were trying to rebrand themselves as singers rather than actors.

=== 2002: T.W.O ===
After a four-year break, T.W.O released their self-titled album T.W.O; the album was their official announcement to the public that they have rebranded after their union was formalized. This was the first album they recorded as a married couple. They released the album in 2002. The album was produced by Omololu Ogunleye and released under their label KopyKats Entertainment.

The album contained the tracks "Show Luv", "Voice Mail", "Ope Mi", and a remix of Fela Kuti's song "Palava". The album had few marketing hiccups. T.W.O was released at a period when there were no structured record labels or companies in Nigeria.

=== 2006: T.W.O 4 Real ===
After four years, T.W.O released a new album under Alec's Music record label. With their last album came criticism from people who did not like the idea of the remakes of popular hit tracks. Their plan was to honor their mentors in the industry by remaking their hit track in each of their album, but the public were not aware of their decision. The critics saw T.W.O as not being creative enough to write their songs.

T.W.O 4 Real had multiple producers: Rymzo produced the tracks "Adupe", "Like a Fool", "Let me be the one", "Tribute 2 Jay" (dedicated to the loving memory of Wunmi’s younger brother Jaiyejeje Aboderin), "I Need Someone", and "What You Give". Pufffy T produced the tracks "Mo Gbo Mo Ya" and "It’s About Us". Charles Duke produced the "Mo Gbo Mo Ya" remix; and Olaitan Adebowale produced "I Need Someone".

The album has some collaboration with other artistes which included Rymzo, Segun Obe, Mode 9, Ruggedman and Freestyle.T.W.O 4 Real was one of their highest-selling albums, with sales figures grossing millions. The album is still in demand.

=== 2010: T.W.O Legit ===
About the time of T.W.O Legit, there were rumours of the couple retiring from music and going back to television, hence the album title. In 2010, T.W.O began recording. T.W.O Legit was produced by several people, including ID Cabasa, Puffy Tee, Rymzo, and Foster Zeeno. Tracks included "Fine Bara", "Atewo", "Zombie", "T.W.O Legit", "Hit the Dance Floor", and "Get This Party Started", among others.

T.W.O had mapped out a business plan for the sale and distribution of the album before its release. The album came in jewel boxes of 20,000 copies taken to strategic outlets targeted at specific audience. Some consumers could not understand the strategy behind the distribution. In the first three months of its release, it appeared like T.W.O had made a wrong decision because the paper pack version was not available at that time. The decision paid off in the long run because the paper pack version sold out as soon as it hit the market. Over 18,000 jewel box copies were sold, with some were given out as corporate gifts.

Alec Music was the sole marketer of the paper pack album. T.W.O also gave Alec Music reproduction rights.

=== 2014: T.W.O PLUS ===
After the release of any album, T.W.O, as a matter of policy conduct research to feel the pulse of the public before recording another album. The outcome of the research conducted by their team revealed that the public are yearning to see T.W.O collaborate with other artiste; especially the younger ones. With that in mind, a couple of names were put together and the process started. T.W.O was open minded about working with artiste who would love to collaborate with them.

In 2014, T.W.O hit the studio again to record T.W.O PLUS. As the name implies, it is a collaboration with other artistes. It features artists 2face Idibia; 9ice; Dammy Krane; and Segun Obe. T.W.O also showed their support for upcoming acts by featuring them in the album, including Teniim; Brace; and Mazi Floss. T.W.O PLUS had multiple producers.

Four singles off the album were released: "Green White Green", featuring 2face Idibia; "Wedding Day", featuring Teniim; "Bianu", featuring Mazi Floss; and "Omonsa".

== Other ventures ==
Apart from music, T.W.O have displayed their artistry and creativity in other ventures. In February 2007, T.W.O premiered their first annual Valentine show, titled Cupid Ball with T.W.O. The first edition of Cupid's Ball first held at Eko Hotel and suites in February 2007, while the second edition held at Lagoon restaurant, Ozumba Mbadiwe, Victoria Island. It was designed to give lovers an unforgettable Valentine experience in a cozy environment with the best in entertainment. It was held for four years before they took a break from it to give attention to other ventures.

T.W.O own and run their music label KopyKats Entertainment alongside other business.

=== Television ===
In the 90s just before the release of their debut album, T.W.O were encouraged to go on air. They took the suggestion and approached Charly Boy to give them a slot in The Charly Boy Show that was already running. Charly Boy accepted and brought them on board. Wunmi presented the "Woman to Woman" segment and featured alongside Tunde in the "Mr. & Mrs." segment.

Wunmi also co-starred in the late Amaka Igwe TV soap opera Tempest - A Tale of 2 Women. Tunde has featured in several Nigerian movies, including The Gardener, in which he played the title character; Daybreak; The Testament; and Goodbye Tomorrow. He once co-hosted the interview programme ZOOM TIME alongside Charly Boy. ZOOM TIME was a Charly Boy Show political spinoff which featured prominent politicians and occasionally entertainers. It was a popular programme that ran for years.

=== Jay Search ===
On December 3, 2004, Wunmi lost her younger brother Jaiyejeje Aboderin, who was only 33 years old. He slumped and died after a game of basketball leaving behind a wife (actress Stella Damasus) and two daughters, Angelica and Isabel. While alive, Jaiye Aboderin supported and encouraged young and upcoming music acts. In 2009, the family launched Jay Search, a talent competition in his memory.

The first Jay Search was held on December 3, 2009. 23-year-old undergraduate OluwaSunbo Olundegun (also known as Big Ma) emerged the winner walked home with a cash prize of N150,000 and a record deal of a single with T.W.O's Kopykats Entertainment record label. Today, she is an on-air personality with a popular lifestyle radio in Nigeria and also runs her PR outfit.

Due to the fact that it was solely sponsored by the family, it took another two years for the second edition of the competition to hold. The winner is offered a recording contract; for one single with KopyKats Entertainment, a cash prize, a photo shoot, a video, and some publicity. The non-profit making competition is designed to make them visible and create a stepping stone for them because they are not bound by any contract. The contestants are taken through two stages of the competition; they perform their composition and another song. They are not restricted to any music genre. The basis of choosing a winner was not about who could sing the best but who had the most marketable song and personality.

The last set of judges were El-Dee of Trybes Record, Segun Demuren of EME, Segun Obe, and Wale Aboderin, Chairman of Punch. In 2011, Daniel Oramali, also known as Chuck Dee, emerged the winner of the second edition while other contestants went home with consolation prizes. The video of his single "Take Control" was unveiled to the public at Federal Palace Hotel on December 13, 2014, at the 10th year memorial of Jaiye Aboderin. Chuck Dee also got the prizes promised as the winner.

=== Personal life ===
T.W.O have been married since 1998, and have three children, Modesayo, Ricardo and Andre. When they are not in the studio recording or rehearsing with their band, they spend quality time with their children and attend to their businesses. They are not a regular in the social scene because they only socialize when necessary. They love the quiet and private lifestyle.

== Discography ==
=== Studio albums ===
1999: Sealed

- "Tomorrow"
- "The Way"
- "Jafunmi"

2002: T.W.O

- "Show Luv"
- "Voice Mail"
- "Ope Mi"
- "Palava"

2006: T.W.O 4 Real

- "Adupe"
- "Like a Fool"
- "Let Me Be the One"
- "Tribute 2 Jay"
- "I Need Someone"
- "And What U Give"
- "Mo Gbo Mo Ya"
- "It's About Us"

2010: T.W.O Legit

- "Fine Bara"
- "Atewo"
- "Zombie"
- "T.W.O Legit"
- "Hit the Dance Floor"
- "Get This Party Started"

2014: T.W.O PLUS

== Awards and nominations ==
Year	Recipient	Award	Result
2014	T.W.O	Best use of Costume (NMVA)	Won
