= Charly Boy =

Nigerian musical artist (born 1950)

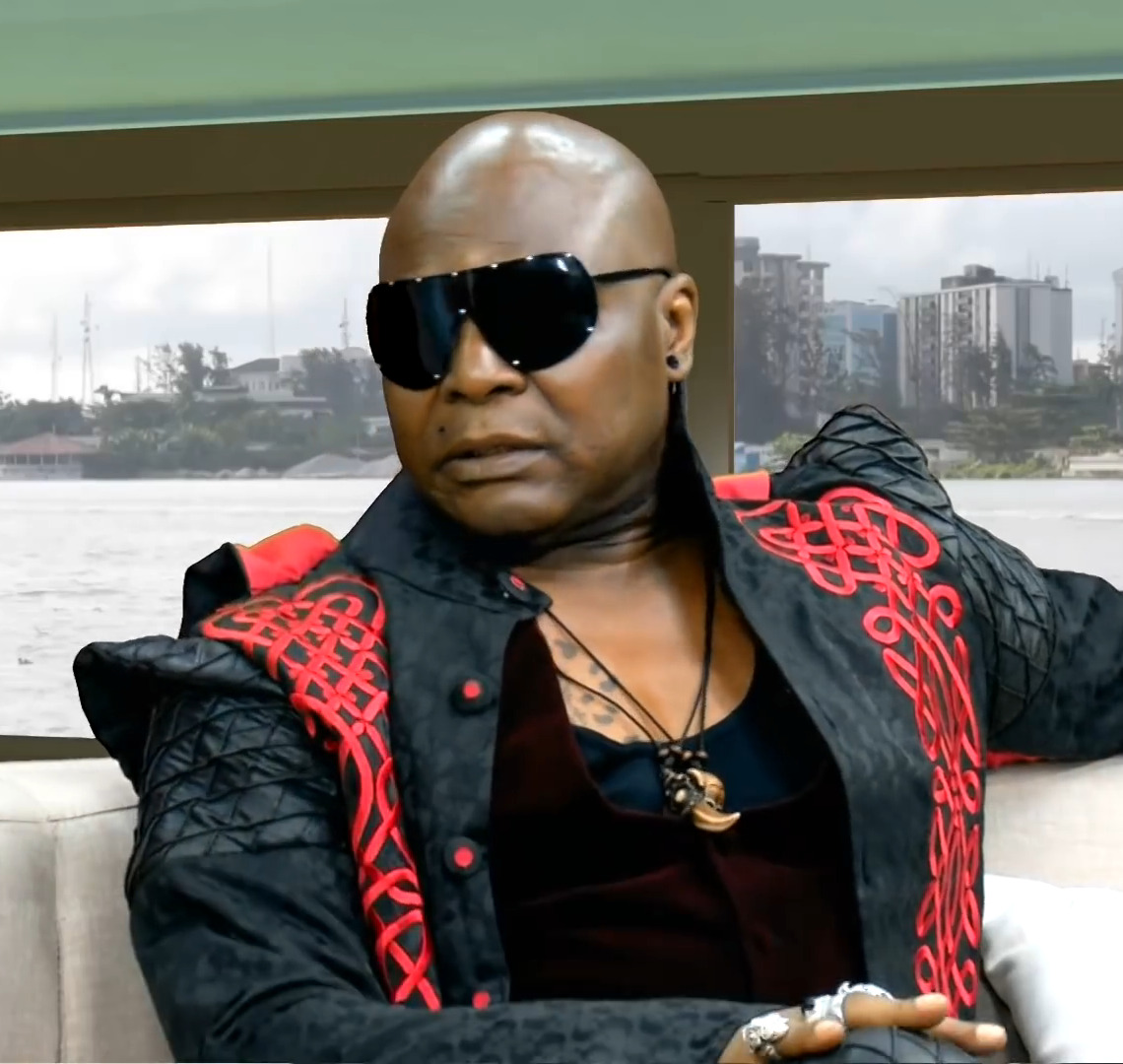

Background information
- Also known as: CB; His Royal Punkness; Area Fada
- Born: Charles Chukwuemeka Oputa; 19 June 1950 (age 76); Port Harcourt, Rivers State, Nigeria
- Genres: Afro pop, Afrobeat, highlife
- Occupations: Singer-songwriter, television presenter, internet personality
- Years active: 1982–present

Charles Chukwuemeka Oputa (born 19 June 1950), popularly known as Charly Boy is a Nigerian singer-songwriter, television presenter, actor, and producer. He is known for his alternative lifestyle, political views, and media productions. Charly Boy is the host of The Charly Boy Show, 2011 judge for Nigerian Idol, and served as president of the Performing Musicians Association of Nigeria.

== Early life ==
The second son of former Supreme Court Justice Chukwudifu Oputa, Oguta-native Oputa was born into a Catholic household, and is the cousin of Swedish musician Dr. Alban. As he often refused to reveal his date of birth in interviews, his age remained unknown until 2011 when he celebrated his sixtieth birthday, however, in his usual enigmatic character, he announced his 63rd birthday on 19 June 2013, making his age a contentious one.

Although he describes his parents as liberals who encouraged their children to express themselves freely, Oputa has also spoken of their conservative nature. He initially aspired to become a priest, but left seminary school after a year. In his late teens he moved to America where he attended college, graduating with a degree in Communications.

== Music ==
=== 1982-1985: Nwata Miss ===
Oputa ventured into the music industry in 1982, and in 1984 independently released the highlife single Obodo GiriGiri. In 1985 was nearly denied a record deal with Polygram Nigeria due to his unconventional appearance until he was introduced to the label's managing director Ton Seysener who signed him, and Nwata Miss was released.

=== 1988-1990: 1990 ===
Towards the late 80s, Oputa with the help of stylist and fellow singer/songwriter Tyna Onwudiwe, created a new punk persona consisting of leather jackets and boots, power bikes, mohawks, and a new direction in music, combining African pop and Afrobeat. A pioneer in Nigeria's short-lived punk movement, he soon earned the unofficial title His Royal Punkness, and renamed his Lagos residence The Punk Palace.

Oputa's most popular album, 1990, was released in 1988, with the title referring to the year Nigeria's corrupt military government was expected to hand over power to civilians in that year, although this did not commence until 1999. 1990 earned Oputa mixed reviews due to its political nature and caused national controversy, and several radio stations refused to play the title track. Despite this, 1990 was one of Nigeria's best-selling albums of 1988, and Oputa was credited with using his music to stand up to his government, a lá Fela Kuti. Oputa would also collaborate with Seysener to establish the annual beach concert Lekki Sunsplash.

The album 1990 included the song "Big Bottom", a tribute to the female derriere. In most Nigerian states it was denied airplay on radio due to its somewhat raunchy lyrics. The accompanying video, deemed ahead of its time, features Charly Boy's wife Diane as a woman with a generous posterior who is a guest at Charly Boy's wedding; as she bends over during the ceremony, the groom turns around to stare at her rear, to the annoyance of his bride. Other features of the video include members of the public unaware that their buttocks are on camera. The "Big Bottom" video was subsequently banned by the Nigeria Broadcasting Commission on grounds of obscenity.

In recent years, Oputa has worked on several collaborations with his cousin Dr. Alban, most notably on the song "Carolina" which sampled an earlier hit of Dr. Alban's – "Guess Who's Coming To Dinner" – and had originally featured singer Michael Rose. The re-worked version was sung in Nigerian Pidgin and was a hit in Nigeria. The pair also recorded the songs "Work Work Africa" and "Commercial Waste".

2021

Odudubariba is a song inspired by his role he played in King of Boys: The Return of the King

== Television ==
=== The Charly Boy Show ===
Charly Boy's most popular television series was The Charly Boy Show – a weekly sketch/variety show with political undertones, and featured music, comedy, and celebrity appearances. Key segments included This Is Not The News (A satirical news bulletin lampooning celebrities), Mama and Papa Nothing Spoil (A bickering elderly couple who provided comical answers to viewer's questions) and Candid Camera. It launched on NTA 2 Channel 5 Lagos in 1991, and was syndicated across other stations across the country. It later moved to AIT until its cancellation in 2001. Among the cast were Charly Boy's wife Diane Oputa, actresses Stella Damasus and Mercy Oyebo, singing duo Tunde and Wunmi Obe, and actor Patrick Doyle. Charly Boy's alter-ego Madam Zigizigi (a drag character) and monologues which condemned the country's dictatorship were also popular features.

The Charly Boy Show was widely criticised for being overtly sexual – Charly Boy's dancers (known as "Charly's Angels") were often shown clothed in S&M outfits and brandishing whips. His political views on the show also came under fire – he would slate Nigeria's military rulers who were accused of corrupting the system.

Despite its popularity, The Charly Boy Show struggled with consistent sponsorship; Charly Boy would recruit celebrity friends to appeal for sponsors on-camera, albeit without much success, and the show was cancelled in 2001 after ten years. In 2022, Charly Boy announced the show's return.

=== The Charly Boy Kiddies Show ===
The Charly Boy Kiddies Show was a short-lived spin-off of the original series aimed at children. Although the show's creator made regular appearances, the main cast consisted of children, and included segments from the original show including Candid Camera, albeit performed by child actors.

Like its predecessor, The Charly Boy Kiddies Show failed to gain sponsors, and was subsequently cancelled. However, in 2010, Charly Boy established The Charly Boy Kiddies Affair in Abuja, which aimed to boost the potential of Nigerian children.

=== Zoom Time ===
Zoom Time was a The Charly Boy Show politics spin-off co-presented by Charly Boy and Tunde Obe (the latter was also a cast member of The Charly Boy Show) which featured prominent politicians and military men. Among those interviewed were former Nigerian president Ibrahim Babangida; this interview was among the most memorable in the history of the show. Occasionally entertainers were interviewed. The show was also famous for its gag which saw politicians pretend to ride an imaginary motorbike while imitating the sound of its exhaust pipe ("Zoom, zoom, zoom!").

=== Nigerian Idol ===
In 2011, Charly Boy replaced Audu Maikori as a judge on Nigerian Idol. Although his stint was a ratings success, viewers disapproved of his antics which included bringing his pet python to the judging table during the audition and a human skull to the live shows. After one season, Charly Boy left the show.

== Advocacy ==
Charly Boy is known as an advocate of the masses as he has fought for the rights of the average Nigerian. He has on several occasions been tortured by the Nigerian police and the military for standing up to his country's government. However he is also, on occasion, regarded as an ally depending on the sensibility of those in power. An inspirational writer, Charly Boy focuses on various subjects in several newspapers including The Daily Post and his own publication Charly Boy Magazine, and has been known to write slogans on rocks in Abuja where he currently resides. An avid supporter of Okada riders in Nigeria - an organization that has been frowned on by government as they have been regarded as a menace and unsafe transportation - he has fought for the rights of Okada users - most of whom are poor individuals who earn their living by using the Okada for commercial purposes; he also stated that operators play a prominent role in government as most politicians engage their services during campaigns. His efforts earned him the name Area Fada.

In the mid-nineties Charly Boy fought for the rights of military pensioners during the Abacha-led military dispensation by marching to Defence headquarters in Abuja to demand payment of their pension arrears. He has also fronted campaigns for Nigerian Widows, and was founder of the Save Nigeria from Nigeria campaign during the last presidential election. During the Fuel Subsidy protest in 2012, he was arrested alongside six other activists for civil disobedience.

He was one of the celebrities who organised fundraisers to support his old friend Tyna Onwudiwe who would later die of lung cancer.

In 2017, Charly Boy started Our Mumu Don Do movement, and participated in a daily sit out protest alongside Deji Adeyanju calling on President Muhammadu Buhari to resume office or resign after the President had spent over 60 days outside the country on a health visit to the UK.

== Acting ==
In 1996, Oputa starred in the Nollywood movie Backstab in which he played a gangster. In 2021 he appeared in King of Boys and Money Miss Road the following year.

== Other ventures ==
Charly Boy is the founder of New Waves Productions and publisher of The Charly Boy Magazine which he launched in 2010 and wrote for regularly. In 1991, he wrote the column Nuts and Screws for defunct women's publication Poise. As a music video producer/director, Charly Boy has worked with numerous music artists including Onyeka Onwenu ("Dancing in the Sun"), Alex O ("She's So Pretty"), Floxy Bee ("Eko"), and Femi Kuti ("No Cause For Alarm?").

In 1990, Charly Boy was among the Nigerian singers who supported Yvonne Chaka Chaka – then the face of Pepsi in Africa – in a series of concerts and featured in a commercial for the brand with Femi Kuti. He was also in a number of Target cigarettes print commercials with his wife Diane.

== Image ==
Charly Boy is known for his change of image which started with androgyny at the start of his music career. His preference for make-up, relaxed and braided hairstyles, and "women's clothing" caused controversy among conservative Nigerians. He would later be nicknamed "Nigeria's Boy George" by entertainment journalists, but claimed that he had started this persona long before his British counterpart became famous.

In the late nineties, Charly Boy began to wear his hair in dreadlocks and adopted a goth image, acquiring piercings and tattoos which were frowned on by society who viewed his modification as Satanic and occultist. In 2012, he introduced his fans to Linda, his female alter ego. Charly Boy continues to sport the goth look, and in 2014 he shaved off his dreadlocks due to a thinning hairline.

In 2010, Charly Boy was interviewed by the magazine E 24-7 alongside equally maverick Channel O presenter Denrele. The article, captioned "Caught In The Act - Yes, I Love Denrele" featured photographs of the pair in suggestive poses including a mouth-to-mouth kiss. As homosexuality is illegal in Nigeria, the pictures sparked rumours that they were a gay couple, a claim they continue to deny, stating that the pictures were for publicity.

In 2012, Charly Boy threatened to take legal action against two national newspapers (The Saturday Mirror and the Daily Independent) after it was reported that he was gay and a member of The Illuminati; he allegedly disclosed this in an interview with entertainment writer Ed Jatto. Later, in another interview with the Nigerian Vanguard, he stated "'I’m not concerned about name calling, but the way and manner in which we apply professionalism in whatever we are doing. If I'm gay, I will fight for the right of homosexuals. I am not gay and I am not part of any organisation called [The Illuminati] in any way, shape or form. I have never had problems with whatever the press writes about me. But these publications have gone beyond the boundaries."

== Personal life ==
Charly Boy has a son with Linda, whom he met in Owerri during secondary school in 1973. His first marriage in 1974 was to Stella Adigwe, but the couple divorced after their son Tony was born. In 1978, Charly Boy married Leslie Meredith, whom he had met at the University of Massachusetts but the union, which he described as a "marriage of convenience", ended after their daughter, Margaret, was born. His 1981 marriage to Yvonne Shablee, produced a son, Sly.

Charly Boy has been married to singer and former fashion designer Diane since 1984. The couple have three children together - Charles, Adaeze, and Dewy.
