= Kola Muslim Animasaun =

Nigerian journalist and columnist

- Born: 5 July 1939
- Died: 30 May 2019 (aged 79)
- Citizenship: Nigerian
- Occupation: Journalism
- Years active: 1961 – present
- Known for: Vanguard

Chief Kola Muslim Animasaun (born 5 July 1939) is a Nigerian journalist, columnist and former chairman of the editorial board of The Vanguard, Nigeria's leading newspaper. His book, From 1939 to the Vanguard of Modern Journalism, was launched at the Nigerian Institute of International Affairs, Lagos in July 2012 and the occasion was attended by Chief Bola Tinubu, the national leader of the All Progressives Congress, and Abiola Ajimobi, the governor of Oyo State, southwestern Nigeria.

== Journalism career ==
He began his career in journalism in July 1961 when he joined The Express through the late Olabisi Onabanjo, the former governor of Ogun State who was then the Editorial Director of the Daily Express. On 25 August 1961 Muslim left The Express for London where he obtained a diploma certificate in Journalism from London School of Journalism. After he completed the diploma programme, he worked briefly with Cecil Dennis, the founder and publisher of the Liberian Listener. Before he returned to Nigeria to join the Nigerian Tribune. He later joined the Vanguard, founded by Chief Sam Amuka Pemu as a chief sub-editor before he rose to the position of chairman of the editorial board of the newspaper.
