= Falola =

- Gender: Male
- Language: Yoruba

Origin
- Origin: Nigerian
- Region of origin: South-West Nigeria

Falola is a Yoruba surname. Notable people with the surname include:

- Dizzy K Falola, Nigerian singer
- Toyin Falola (born 1953), Nigerian historian
