= Newspaper Proprietors' Association of Nigeria =

Nigerian advocacy group on journalism

The Newspaper Proprietors' Association of Nigeria or NPAN is a professional body concerned with the regulation of journalism in Nigeria. The President of the Association is Maiden Alex Ibru, publisher of The Guardian (Nigeria), one of Nigeria's national Newspaper. The patron of the Association is Chief Sam Amuka-Pemu, a Nigerian journalist, columnist and founder of the Vanguard , Nigeria's leading newspaper, and co-founder of The Punch, most widely read newspaper in Nigeria. The general secretary is Angela Emuwa, chairman of The Punch.

== Roles ==
One of its major functions, is to investigate complaints against the press from the public and also to investigate complaints from the press about the conduct of people or organizations towards the press. NPAN acts as a buffer between the press and the public.

== History ==
Attempts to establish this self regulatory body for the Nigerian Press started as far back as two decades ago with the establishment of the Ekineh Commission. The Commission, which was set up by a distinguished Nigerian attorney and sponsored by the General Yakubu Gowon government, was intended to study the future of the Nigerian media.

However, this Commission never made its findings public, which defeated the purpose. Another attempt was made through the establishment of the Nigerian Media Council Decree No 59 of 1988. However, this attempt failed, largely because journalists were apprehensive concerning the seemingly undemocratic powers conferred upon the council.
