= Minister of Information and National Orientation =

Cabinet position in Nigeria

- Incumbent; Mohammed Idris Malagi since 21 August 2023
- Federal Ministries of Nigeria
- Style: The Honourable Minister
- Status: Active
- Member of: Cabinet of Nigeria
- Reports to: President of Nigeria
- Residence: Federal Capital Territory
- Seat: Federal Secretariat Complex
- Appointer: President of Nigeria; After screening by the Senate of Nigeria
- Formation: 1957; 69 years ago
- First holder: Kola Balogun

The Minister of Information and National Orientation is the head of the Ministry of Information and National Orientation along with serving as a member of the Federal Executive Council. As the head of the ministry, the minister leads the department and acts as a key spokesperson for the executive branch of the Nigerian federal government. The minister also leads a number of agencies and parastatals involved with affairs related to the press along with promoting culture and tourism.

The position is appointed by the president, with the advice and consent of the Senate of Nigeria. As stipulated by the Revenue Mobilisation Allocation and Fiscal Commission formula for ministerial salaries, the annual basic salary of the minister is ₦2,026,400 with ₦5,775,240 received in regular allowances for a total of ₦7,801,640 as the annual regular salary. Along with the regular salary, other allowances can raise the total payment to over ₦25 million.

The position is currently held by Mohammed Idris Malagi, who was sworn in as minister on 21 August 2023 following his confirmation by the Senate.
