= Reddington Hospital =

Private hospital in Lagos, Nigeria

Geography
- Location: Lagos, Nigeria
- Coordinates: 6.433136°N 3.420371°E

Organisation
- Type: General
- Affiliated university: Cromwell Hospital in London

Services
- Emergency department: Yes

Helipads
- Helipad: No

History
- Founded: 2006

Links
- Website: www.reddingtonhospital.com
- Lists: Hospitals in Nigeria

Reddington Hospital is a private hospital in Lagos, Nigeria.

== Establishment ==
Reddington commenced operations as a health care provider in 2001 with the establishment of the Cardiac Centre, in Victoria Island which was affiliated with Cromwell Hospital in London. The Lagos hospital was established in 2006. It has another facility in Ikeja.

== Milestone ==
Reddington pioneered Nigeria's first Digital Cardiac Catherization and Angiography suite, a specialty in heart care. It is reputed to be the death location of Onyeka Onwenu.

== Services ==
The hospital provides the following services:

- renal dialysis
- obstetrics and gynaecology
- paediatrics
- surgery (endoscopy and day-care)
- ophthalmology
- ENT (Ear, Nose and Throat) surgery
- radiology
- Gastroenterology (digestive diseases)
- psychiatry
