= Dizzy K Falola =

Dizzy K Falola (born Kunle Falola) is a London-based Nigerian singer, currently performing as a gospel artiste, but is perhaps best known as a former 1980s pop star, famed for the hit "Baby Kilode".

== Early life and pop career ==
Falola, whose parents died when he was young, was raised in Nigeria, where he displayed an early talent for music, and studied at the University of Ife.

He met Tony Okoroji, who became his mentor, in the early 1980s and soon began working with him. His album Baby Kilode, and its title track, became instant hits. Other albums included Sweet Music and Excuse Me Baby. Along with Chris Okotie, Felix Lebarty and Jide Obi Falola stimulated Nigeria's emerging music industry with a unique brand of pop music. His last secular hit was African Jamboree, produced by Bisade Ologunde.

== Gospel music ministry ==
As a famous singer, Falola lived life in the fastlane until he became a born-again Christian in 1989. Encouraged by singer Ebenezer Obey who himself had rediscovered Christianity, Falola turned down a recording contract with EMI to relocate to the United Kingdom and concentrate on gospel music. His first Christian recording was in 1994; since then he has toured with ministries through Europe and America where his albums My Joy, Power in the Blood, The Healing Songs, I'm Blessed, and Marvellous have sold alongside Canada, Sweden, and numerous African countries. In 2001, after many years abroad, he paid a short visit to his homeland, and in 2002 performed at the official African launch of the Dizzy K Gospel Music Ministries and the Centre of my Joy album.

Now married with four children, Falola continues to reside in London, and runs a studio that publicises youth problems.
