= Sam Amuka-Pemu =

Nigerian journalist

- Born: 13 June 1935 (age 91); Sapele, Delta State, Nigeria
- Citizenship: Nigerian
- Occupations: Journalist, columnist and publisher
- Years active: 1971–present
- Known for: Founder of Vanguard newspaper

Prince Sam Amuka-Pemu (born 13 June 1935) is a Nigerian journalist, columnist and publisher, who founded the Vanguard, Nigeria's leading newspaper, and was co-founder of The Punch, one of the most widely read newspapers in Nigeria. He was born in Sapele, a city in Delta State, southern Nigeria, into the family of Pa Amuka-Pemu and Madam Teshoma Amuka-Pemu.

== Journalism career ==
He was a Daily Times of Nigeria editor and the first editor of the Sunday Punch before he established The Punch with his friend, the late Olu Aboderin, in 1971. He later established Vanguard Newspaper in 1983 with three other Nigerian columnists. Amuka was described as a "Gentleman of the Press" by President Muhammadu Buhari on his 80th birthday. He was described as an icon and a leading light in Nigerian journalism by Nduka Obaigbena, a former president of the Newspaper Proprietors’ Association of Nigeria. Amuka-Pemu is the oldest practising media professional in Nigeria today who had been cited by peers. A book entitled From 1939 to the Vanguard of Modern Journalism written by Kola Muslim Animasaun, who also trained under him, acknowledged his immense contributions to journalism in Nigeria.
