= Blueprint (newspaper) =

Nigerian national daily newspaper

- Type: Daily newspaper
- Format: Tabloid
- Owner: Blueprint Newspapers Limited
- Founder(s): Mohammed Idris Malagi, Salisu Umar, Zainab Suleiman Okino, and Ibrahim Sheme
- Editor: Abdulrahman Abdulrauf
- Managing editor: Clem Oluwole
- Founded: 2011; 15 years ago
- Language: English
- Headquarters: Abuja
- Country: Nigeria
- Website: http://www.blueprint.ng/

Blueprint is a Nigerian daily newspaper based in Abuja. The newspaper started as a weekly publication in May 2011, then switched to a daily paper in September 2011. The paper has four editions - the daily edition, the weekend edition, the Hausa language weekly edition called Manhaja, and the online edition which updates as events unfold.
