= Spirit of Love (Majek Fashek album) =

Studio album by Majek Fashek
- Released: 1991
- Label: Interscope
- Producer: Little Steven, Majek Fashek

Majek Fashek chronology
I & I Experience (1989)	Spirit of Love (1991)	Rainmaker (1997)

Spirit of Love is an album by the Nigerian musician Majek Fashek. It was released in 1991. Fashek was credited with the Prisoners of Conscience.

"Send Down the Rain" had been a major hit in Nigeria. Fashek supported the album by touring with Tracy Chapman.

== Production ==
The album was produced by Little Steven, who also played guitar; Little Steven became interested after seeing Fashek perform at the Apollo Theater. It was recorded in Los Angeles and New York, with the Prisoners of Conscience numbering 12 members. Spirit of Love mixed reggae styles with jùjú music, employing talking drums on many tracks. "Majek Fashek in a New York" incorporated elements of dancehall.

== Critical reception ==
Professional ratings
Review scores
Source	Rating
AllMusic	4.5/5 stars
Chicago Tribune	3.5/4 stars
Los Angeles Daily News	4/4 stars
Los Angeles Times	2.5/4 stars
MusicHound World: The Essential Album Guide	4.5/5 stars

The Chicago Tribune called the album "reggae with a more lively and sophisticated rhythmic sensibility." The Milwaukee Sentinel noted that Fashek "often resembles the young Bob Marley sometimes too closely," but praised his "charisma and spiritual fervor, supported by his band's African/reggae sound"; it listed the album as one of the 10 best of 1991. The Houston Chronicle also listed it as one of the best albums of the year.

The Boston Globe deemed the album "a joyous compilation of talking drums, maracas, horns and guitars." The Los Angeles Times concluded that Fashek "writes with character, depth and fire, but fails to stake out his own territory." The Virginian-Pilot stated that he "mixes tunes about suffering and politics with ones about longing and love, all the while blending reggae with rock, soul and the rhythms of Africa."

AllMusic wrote: "Seamlessly blending elements of juju with reggae, Fashek turns from imitator to innovator in a disc with so much clear-eyed enthusiasm and vision you'd think reggae was his personal invention."

== Track listing ==
No.	Title	Length
1.	"Majek Beware"
2.	"So Long"
3.	"Majek Fashek in a New York"
4.	"Spirit of Love"
5.	"Jah People"
6.	"Religion Is Politics"
7.	"Holy Spirit"
8.	"Send Down the Rain"
9.	"I'm Not Tired"
10.	"I Come from de Ghetto"
