= Ibrahim Sheme =

Nigerian writer and journalist

Dr. Ibrahim Sheme
- Born: Katsina, Katsina State
- Education: University of Wales, Cardiff (M.A); Bayero University (B.A)
- Writing career
- Language: Hausa and English
- Website: ibrahimsheme.net

Ibrahim Sheme is a bilingual Nigerian writer, journalist, filmmaker, and publisher. He worked as editor and correspondent of many Nigerian newspapers, including Leadership, The Tide, New Nigerian, The Reporter, and Hotline Magazine. He also authored the official biography of the number two man in the military government of General Olusegun Obasanjo, the late Major-General Shehu Musa Yar’Adua, and the official biography of the leading Hausa musician and singer, the late Mamman Shata. He was the pioneer editor of Blueprint Newspaper and later its editor-in-chief. Sheme has been the Director of Media and Publicity at the National Open University of Nigeria since 2016.

== Early life and education ==
Sheme was born in Faskari Local Government Area, Katsina State, in 1968 (though he uses 1966 in official documents). He attended Maigamji Primary School and Ruwan-Godiya Primary School, both in Funtua Local Government Area in the old Kaduna State (now in Katsina State) between 1973–1979, and finished his secondary school education at Government College, Kaduna, in 1984. He received his undergraduate degree in Mass Communication from Bayero University, Kano (BUK), in 1989. In the university, he was among the leading literary activists and served as both the editor-in-chief of The Parakeet, a literary journal, and editor of the Bayero Beacon, the official campus newspaper. He also served as secretary-general of the Katsina State Students Association. On graduation, he was awarded two coveted prizes, one as the Best Graduating Student in his department and the other as the overall best graduating student in the university.

In 1993, after working as a journalist in Port Harcourt, Rivers State, and Kaduna, Sheme proceeded to the University of Wales in Cardiff, United Kingdom, where he received Master of Arts in Communication Studies in 1994. Sheme served as national publicity secretary of the Association of Nigerian Authors.

== Literary activities ==
Sheme is one of the leading authors and literary critics in northern Nigeria. His first novel, "Kifin Rijiya" (The Ignoramus), which he wrote while still a student in Bayero University and was published in 1991, won second position in the Northern Languages Novel Writing Competition organised by the Kaduna State government.

His second novel, "'Yartsana" (The Doll), won the first place prize in the maiden Bashir Karaye Prize for Hausa Writing. His other works include "The Malam's Potion"_(a collection of short stories), a travelogue on his tour of Israel and the Palestinian territories titled "Ilmi Mabudin Tafiya", a biography of the late Major-General Shehu Musa Yar'Adua, and a biography of the late Alhaji Mamman Shata titled "Shata Ikon Allah!" He also edited an anthology of short stories for the Association of Nigerian Authors titled "Cramped Rooms and Open Spaces".

Sheme was a central figure in the debate over Hausa romance fiction which raged in several newspapers and magazines in northern Nigeria between 1991 and 1999. The highly popular discourse, called "The Great Soyayya Debate", pitched writers, academics and literary critics such as Ibrahim Malumfashi, Abdalla Uba Adamu, Yusuf M. Adamu, Ado Ahmad Gidan Dabino, and others on the efficacy and need for the romance novels known as "soyayya books". Sheme initiated the debate as acting editor cum literary editor of Nasiha, the Hausa weekly newspaper being published by Nationhouse Press (publishers of The Reporter newspaper) in Kaduna. He took the debate to other media houses where he subsequently worked as editor or literary editor: Hotline and Rana magazines, New Nigerian, Weekly Trust, and Leadership newspaper. The debate attracted the attention of Nigerian and foreign scholars such as Professor Graham Furniss of the School of Oriental and African Studies (SOAS), University of London, who documented it.

In the mid-'90s, Sheme served as the national publicity secretary of Association of Nigerian Authors (ANA). He was also the pioneer secretary-general of ANA in Kaduna State.

== Filmmaking activities ==
Ibrahim Sheme has been linked to the robust filmmaking industry in northern Nigeria known as Kannywood. He wrote the script for many Hausa movies and even produced some. His movies include Gagarabadau (Unbeatable), Daren Farko (The First Night), and Fargaba (Fear). Sheme also wrote songs for several singers in Kannywood.

His most notable activity in Kannywood, however, has been the publication of the two leading news magazines, Fim and Bidiyo. Fim (meaning Film) was set up by Sheme and some friends of his in March 1999, with Sheme as the publisher. He took over the monthly magazine as sole owner in 2002 and has been publishing it without fail since then. The magazine publishes news, interviews, gossip, etc., about stakeholders in the industry, but it later expanded its coverage to Hausa culture in general, with a section on traditional music, creative writing, and craft. The section was actually created after the death of Bahaushiya, a quarterly magazine founded by Sheme in 2006 to fill a void. The magazine Bidiyo (Video), which Sheme founded with a focus solely on the art of filmmaking, was rested after 10 editions due to low patronage because the readers preferred the scintillating gossip and lifestyle news Fim magazine provides. But Fim has suffered low sales in recent years due to the pervasive encroachment of social media in journalism generally. From over 10,000 copies monthly sale, it has come down to a few hundred. However, there has been a marked shift by the magazine to operate its news-selling business online – in its website and social media handles.

== Selected works ==
- Cramped Rooms and Open Spaces: An Anthology of New Short Fiction (for ANA): 1999.
- The Malam's Potion and Other Stories: Informart Publishers, 1999.
- 'Yartsana: (in Hausa) Informart Publishers, 2003.
- Ilmi Mabud̳in Tafiya.. (Travelogue on Israel in Hausa), Informart Publishers, 2005.
- Shata Ikon Allah! (Biography of late Hausa Musician, Mamman Shata): Informart Publishers, 2006
- Kifin Rijiya (lit. The Ignoramus: in Hausa), Nationhouse Press, 1991
- Bango Ya Tsage (a Hausa translation of Chinua Achebe's Things Fall Apart), Unpublished
