= Alex O =

- Born: Alex Okoroigwe; Imo State, Nigeria
- Occupations: Singer, musician
- Instrument: Singer
- Years active: 1988–present
- Labels: PolyGram, Quiet Storm Records

Alex Okoroigwe, professionally known as Alex O, is a Nigerian pop musician, singer, songwriter and music producer.

== Biography ==
Alex O was born in Imo State, where he started his music career. Uncle Steve Rhodes as he was known, joined the Lemmy Jackson music company as a production assistant and songwriter. Alex was signed to PolyGram Records, Premier Music of Nigeria in 1988.

Alex O married Oby Edozie, a Nigerian film actress and producer.
