= Deji Adeyanju =

Nigerian human rights activist and lawyer

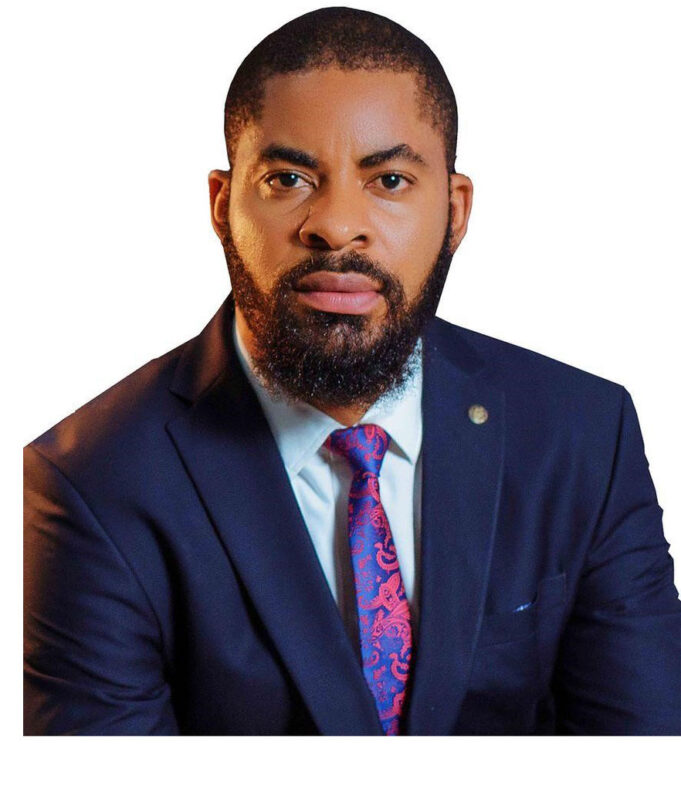
- Deji Adeyanju
- Born: Charles Deji Adeyanju; 9 December 1979 (age 46); Kabba, Kogi State, Nigeria
- Citizenship: Nigerian
- Education: Bayero University, Kano; Baze University (LL.B); Nigerian Law School; Baze University (LL.M)
- Occupations: Lawyer; Human rights activist; Civil rights leader
- Years active: c. 1995–present
- Employer(s): Deji Adeyanju & Partners (Founding Partner)
- Organization(s): Concerned Nigerians; Centre for Liberty
- Known for: Founder of Concerned Nigerians; Chair of Centre for Liberty; advocacy against police brutality and executive overreach in Nigeria
- Spouse: Nana Bello (m. December 2023)
- Awards: Most Courageous Activist of the Year (2019) – DAAR Communications
- Website: dejiadeyanjuandpartners.com

Deji Adeyanju (born 9 December 1979) is a Nigerian lawyer and activist. He founded the pro-democracy group Concerned Nigerians, which he later led as convener, and is a founding partner of the law firm Deji Adeyanju & Partners in Abuja. His activism has focused on issues including police brutality and civil liberties.

Adeyanju, a former student union leader, started his activism under the military government of Sani Abacha, and has faced repeated arrests over the years for organising protests against state authorities. He previously served as Head of New Media for the Peoples Democratic Party (PDP), before leaving to pursue full-time activism in 2017. He received a Bachelor of Laws with First Class Honours from Baze University in 2022 and was called to the Nigerian Bar shortly after.

== Early life and education ==
Adeyanju was born in Kabba, in the Kabba-Bunu Local Government Area of Kogi State, north-central Nigeria. He is a native of Ayere, a town in Ijumu Local Government Area, and is a member of the Okun people. He was raised in an extended family in Kabba.

He obtained his primary school leaving certificate from Kojola Primary School in Kabba (1986–1991), and subsequently completed his secondary education at Kaduna Capital School in Kaduna (1993–1999), obtaining the Senior Secondary Certificate Examination (SSCE).

He enrolled at Bayero University, Kano in 2001 to study Mass Communication, but did not complete the degree after facing legal proceedings during his student years. In 2019, he enrolled at Baze University in Abuja to study law, and was awarded a Bachelor of Laws with First Class Honours in 2022. He then attended the Nigerian Law School in Abuja and was called to the Nigerian Bar. He later completed a Master of Laws (LL.M) at Baze University in 2025.

== Early activism ==
Adeyanju has dated the start of his activism to around age 16. He has described himself as a former student union leader whose first confrontations with state authority came under the military government of Sani Abacha.

The bulk of his documented student activism is associated with his time at Bayero University, Kano, where he was involved in student union activities before being arrested and prosecuted on a murder allegation he has characterised as politically motivated. He was acquitted and the case was resolved in 2009; the same allegation was later revived by the state in 2018 before being dismissed again on grounds of double jeopardy.

== Political career ==
Prior to full-time activism, Adeyanju served as the Head of New Media for the Peoples Democratic Party (PDP). He left the role in 2017 to focus full-time on activism.

== Concerned Nigerians ==
Adeyanju is the founder and former convener of Concerned Nigerians for the Protection of Human Rights and the Rule of Law, a Nigeria-registered civil society organisation.

Under Adeyanju's leadership, Concerned Nigerians organised protests and demonstrations at Unity Fountain in Abuja — the Federal Capital Territory's designated public protest ground — and issued formal letters and petitions to government institutions, including the National Assembly.

In February 2025, Adeyanju stepped down as convener of Concerned Nigerians to focus on his law career, handing over leadership to pro-democracy activist Adebayo Raphael.

== Activism ==
=== Free Sheikh el-Zakzaky campaign ===
Among his longest-running campaigns was the push for the release of Sheikh Ibrahim el-Zakzaky, leader of the Islamic Movement in Nigeria (IMN), who was detained by the Buhari administration following the December 2015 Zaria killings. Adeyanju and Concerned Nigerians organised a prolonged daily sit-out at Unity Fountain in Abuja calling for el-Zakzaky's release. During the campaign, he was arrested by police, including an incident in which the FCT Police Commissioner personally led officers who dispersed protesters with tear gas and detained Adeyanju for several hours without charge or formal prosecution.

=== Free Nnamdi Kanu protest ===
In April 2017, Adeyanju was arrested in Abuja while participating in a protest calling for the release of Nnamdi Kanu, leader of the Indigenous People of Biafra (IPOB), who had been detained by the Buhari administration. He was held alongside other activists and subsequently released.

=== Arrests and detentions under the Buhari administration (2018–2019) ===
By 2018, Adeyanju was a vocal critic of President Muhammadu Buhari's administration. He had been arrested multiple times for leading protests against the administration.

==== November 2018 arrest ====
On 28 November 2018, he was arrested in Abuja while leading a protest titled "Police Are Not Politicians, Save Our Democracy", which demanded the neutrality of the police ahead of the 2019 general elections. Three mobile phones were seized. He was arraigned the same day at a Chief Magistrate's Court in Karshi, Abuja, granted bail, but was unable to meet the conditions and was transferred to Keffi Prison, where he remained until 6 December 2018.

==== December 2018 re-arrest and murder charge ====
On 13 December 2018, he was re-arrested by the Inspector-General of Police Monitoring Unit, with police citing the 2005 murder case as grounds, despite its resolution in 2009. Senate President Bukola Saraki and others described the re-arrest as more political than judicial.

He was transferred from Abuja to Kano on 18 December 2018, and arraigned on 21 December before a Chief Magistrate's Court in Kano, which found that it lacked jurisdiction to try murder cases and remanded him pending referral to a higher court. The National Human Rights Commission of Nigeria issued a press release condemning what it called "the process of constant harassment and intimidation" of Adeyanju, while the Nigerian Senate ordered its joint committee on police and judiciary to investigate his re-arrest.

==== Release and acquittal ====
In February 2019, the Kano State High Court granted him bail, and on 1 March 2019 he was released from Kano Central Prison after more than two months in detention. On 1 November 2019, the Kano State High Court discharged and acquitted him of the murder charge, holding that he had already been acquitted in 2009 and that retrying him violated the constitutional prohibition against double jeopardy.

=== Attack during #FreeSowore protest ===
On 23 December 2019, Adeyanju was leading a protest at the headquarters of the National Human Rights Commission in Abuja demanding the release of journalist and activist Omoyele Sowore, who had been re-arrested by the Department of State Services (DSS) despite two court orders directing his release. A group of counter-protesters attacked the demonstrators; Adeyanju was beaten and sustained injuries, and was subsequently flown to Dubai, United Arab Emirates for medical treatment. Nigerian media reported that he was in critical condition. Adeyanju subsequently alleged that the DSS had orchestrated the attack in retaliation for his activism.

=== #EndSARS protests ===
In October 2020, Adeyanju was among the activists who led the #EndSARS protests in Abuja, alongside Omoyele Sowore and others. Adeyanju has said he and Sowore were among the early organisers of the #EndSARS movement, having organised earlier protests against police brutality by SARS before the mass protests of October 2020. He also used his legal capacity to challenge a private prosecution suit filed against 50 individuals — including himself, singer Davido, and activist Aisha Yesufu — for their involvement in the protests. The FCT High Court struck out the suit and upheld injunctive orders restraining the prosecution.

=== #EndBadGovernance protests ===
In August 2024, Adeyanju served as legal counsel to protesters during the #EndBadGovernance protests across Nigeria. He spoke to CNN about counter-demonstrations by pro-government groups during the protests. He secured the release of 26 protesters and journalists detained by the police and DSS in Abuja following the protests. He subsequently represented 124 protesters — including minors aged 14 to 17 — charged with treason (see Legal career).

== Legal career and notable cases ==
After his call to the Nigerian Bar, Adeyanju co-founded the Abuja-based law firm Deji Adeyanju & Partners, with a practice focused primarily on human rights and criminal law.

Adeyanju and his firm have represented several clients in politically sensitive cases. He advocated for the release of journalist and activist Omoyele Sowore during his detentions by the DSS in 2019. He served as legal counsel to social media activist Martins Vincent Otse (VeryDarkMan) across multiple arrests from 2024 to 2025, including Otse's detention by the Economic and Financial Crimes Commission (EFCC) in May 2025 following a visit to a Guaranty Trust Bank branch in Abuja. He was part of the legal team that secured the release of rapper Darlington Achakpo (Speed Darlington), who was arrested twice in 2024–2025 following a petition by fellow musician Burna Boy. In 2024, he represented 124 protesters, including minors aged 14 to 17, who were arrested and charged with treason following the #EndBadGovernance protests; he told Human Rights Watch that detained children appeared malnourished and were denied access to counsel prior to arraignment.

=== Third-party motor insurance enforcement case ===
In 2025, Adeyanju filed a suit (FHC/ABJ/CS/291/2025) at the Federal High Court in Abuja against the Inspector-General of Police, the Attorney-General of the Federation, and the Federal Road Safety Corps (FRSC), seeking judicial clarification on the enforcement of third-party motor vehicle insurance laws in Nigeria.

Adeyanju argued that while law enforcement agencies have the authority to check compliance with insurance requirements, they lack the legal power to impose fines on motorists without judicial approval. In April 2026, the court, presided over by Justice Hauwa Yilwa, ruled in his favour, holding that the Nigeria Police Force and the FRSC may enforce compliance but cannot impose fines on motorists without a court order. The court held that only a court of competent jurisdiction may impose such penalties, distinguishing between enforcement and sanctioning powers, and restrained the agencies from collecting fines during roadside checks.

=== DSS detainee releases ===
In November 2026, Adeyanju said his law firm had secured the release of four men held by the Department of State Services (DSS) for more than four years. The men, Emele Uduma Ibe, Berefgagha Appah, Ondokeyilemi Aggry and Oyeinmokebebeton Aggry, were arrested in May 2022 in Bayelsa State over alleged links to the Indigenous People of Biafra (IPOB). The DSS later cleared them, and each was reportedly paid ₦5 million in compensation.

Adeyanju said the release came after months of talks with the DSS, and thanked its Director-General for reviewing long-running detention cases. He added that the firm was handling similar cases, including detainees held at Wawa Barracks in Minna.

== Civil society roles ==
=== Centre for Liberty ===
Adeyanju serves as the chair of the Centre for Liberty, a pro-democracy organisation focused on civil liberties and electoral reform advocacy.

=== Africans Rising ===
Adeyanju served as Co-Chair of Africans Rising from July 2021 to 2023 (also referred to as African Rising), a pan-African movement working for unity, justice, peace, and dignity, headquartered in The Gambia. He was elected to the Co-Chair role in July 2021 during a governance meeting of the movement's Coordinating Collective in Arusha, Tanzania, alongside Co-Chair Prof. Wangui wa Goro (Kenya/UK), serving until 2023. In that capacity, he participated in solidarity interventions in Guinea, the Democratic Republic of Congo, Cameroon, and other countries to support the restoration of democratic governance.

== Controversies ==
=== Fallout with Charly Boy and Our Mumu Don Do ===
Adeyanju was a prominent member of the Our Mumu Don Do movement, a civil society coalition led by entertainer Charles Oputa (known as Charly Boy), which organised protests against the Buhari government between 2016 and 2019. On 13 March 2019, shortly after his release from Kano Central Prison, Adeyanju publicly resigned from the movement, accusing Charly Boy of betraying the cause while he was detained. He alleged that Charly Boy had received money from the government and used it to produce campaign material against opposition presidential candidate Atiku Abubakar, and to cease attacks on the Buhari administration.

Charly Boy responded through the Our Mumu Don Do movement, acknowledging the resignation and stating the organisation would review evidence before responding to the allegations. He subsequently alleged that Adeyanju had sought a share of the money he received, which Adeyanju denied.

=== DSS bribery allegation ===
Following the attack on him during the #FreeSowore protest in December 2019, Adeyanju publicly alleged that the Department of State Services (DSS) had offered him ₦1 million to withdraw from the protest and suspend his advocacy for Sowore's release. He stated that he rejected the offer, and alleged that a subsequent assault on him was organised by the DSS in retaliation for his refusal and for publicly exposing the bribery attempt. The DSS did not publicly respond to the allegation, which has not been independently verified.

=== PDP defamation apology ===
In late 2024, Adeyanju appeared on a podcast and alleged that the PDP National Chairman Umar Damagun and National Secretary Samuel Anyanwu were operating as moles of President Bola Tinubu within the opposition party. Both officials threatened civil and criminal litigation for defamation through their counsel. On 6 December 2024, Adeyanju's law firm issued a formal letter of apology signed by senior associate Zainab Otega, withdrawing the statements and expressing regret for any perceived defamation.

=== Peter Obi bribery allegation ===
In August 2025, Adeyanju alleged in a live interview on Channels Television that Peter Obi, the Labour Party presidential candidate in the 2023 Nigerian presidential election, had offered him an envelope of cash during a private meeting in the build-up to the election, which he said he refused. Adeyanju said he had initially expressed positive views about Obi's candidacy but became critical following the meeting.

Obi's legal team threatened to sue Adeyanju for defamation, describing his statements as false and malicious. A journalist who said he was present at the meeting, Ike Abonyi, publicly denied that any money was offered, stating that the envelope was a customary gesture to cover transport costs and not an inducement.

== Personal life ==
Adeyanju is married. He is based in Abuja.

He is an active member of the Nigerian Bar Association, Bwari Branch, and serves on the NBA Citizens' Liberties Committee.

== Recognition ==
Adeyanju has participated as a panellist and discussant at Nigerian Bar Association events, including sessions held by its Public Interest and Development Law section (NBA-SPIDEL).

In January 2019, he was named Most Courageous Activist of the Year by DAAR Communications PLC, operators of AIT and RayPower FM.

== Board membership ==
In May 2026, Adeyanju was appointed to the board of the Katutu Civil Rights Center, a New York-based civil rights organisation.
