= Orits Williki =

Nigerian reggae musician

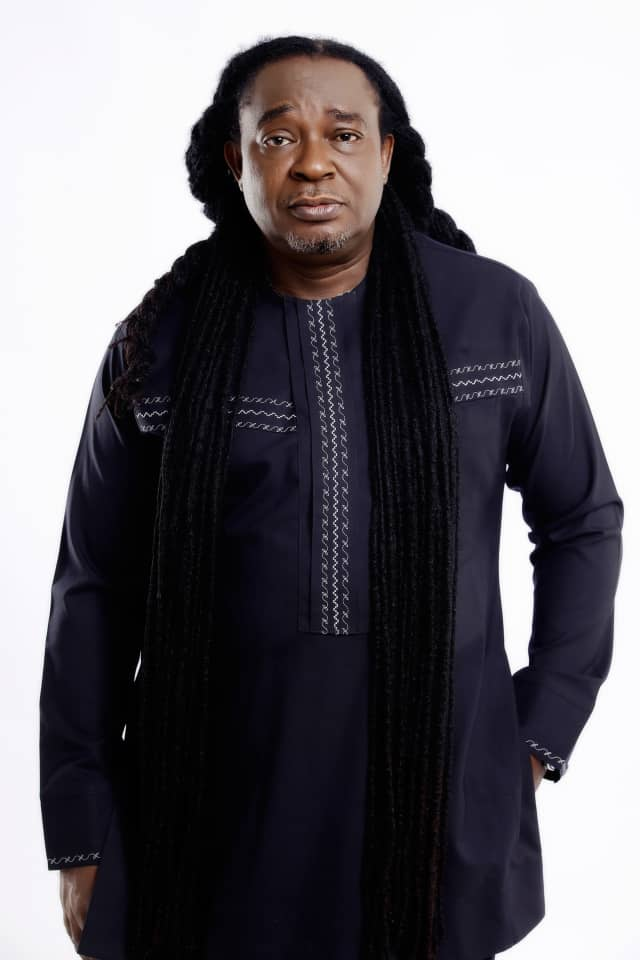
Orits Williki

Orits Wiliki is a Nigerian reggae musician who gained recognition with the success of his 1989 album Tribulation, produced in part by Lemmy Jackson. This was followed by Conqueror in 1990, and in 1991, he released the less successful LP Wha Dis Wha Dat. The album included the single "Heart of Stone", which featured an Islamic chant, added by Wiliki, a Christian, to promote religious tolerance. Religion was a significant influence in some of his songs, as was his disenchantment with the Nigerian society.

Wiliki is a member of the Music Copyright Society of Nigeria, a rival association to the Copyright Society of Nigeria.

== Discography ==
- Tribulation (1989) – Polydor Records
- Conqueror (1990) – Polydor Records
- Wha Dis Wha Dat (1991) – Premier Music.
