= D. K. Onwenu =

Nigerian politician

Dickson Kanu Onwenu was a Nigerian teacher and politician who represented Port Harcourt at the Federal House of Representatives from 1954 until his death in 1956. He is the father of singer Onyeka Onwenu.

Onwenu was acting principal of Enitonia High School, Port Harcourt. He was a member of Igbo State Union and was secretary of the Port Harcourt branch of the union. An NCNC party member and later town councillor, he was an appointed member of the Port Harcourt Caretaker Committee in 1954, after dissolution of the Port Harcourt Town Council.
