= Wale Aboderin =

Nigerian journalist

- Born: Gbadebowale Aboderin; 1958
- Died: 30 May 2018 (aged 60); Ikoyi, Lagos
- Occupations: Journalist; entrepreneur; editor; chairman of Punch Nigeria Limited
- Known for: Chairman of Punch Nigeria Limited

Gbadebowale Aboderin (1958 – 30 May 2018) was a Nigerian journalist, businessman and sports administrator, who was until his death the chairman of Punch Nigeria Limited, a publishing house founded by his father.

== Life ==
Described by Vanguard as a pillar of journalism, he schooled at Government College, Ibadan and Clifton College, before undergoing aviation training at Burnside-Ott Flying School. In sports, he was chairman of, the Lagos State Basketball Association and vice-president of the Nigeria Basketball Supporters Club. Aboderin died after a heart surgery in Lagos. President of Nigeria, Muhammadu Buhari, Governor of Lagos, Akinwunmi Ambode were among those that commiserated with his family.

In 1997, he established Nigeria's first private female basketball club, Dolphins.

== Death ==
Wale Aboderin died on 30 May 2018 at Ikoyi, Lagos, at the age of 60.
