= The Punch =

Nigerian newspaper

- Type: Daily
- Format: Broadsheet
- Owner: Family
- Publisher: Wale Aboderin
- Founded: 1970
- Language: English
- City: Lagos
- Country: Nigeria
- Circulation: 80,000
- Website: www.punchng.com

The Punch is a Nigerian daily newspaper founded on August 8, 1970. The newspaper's aim is said to be to "inform, educate and entertain Nigerians and the world at large".

== History ==
The Punch was founded by James Aboderin, an accountant, and Sam Amuka, a columnist and editor at the Daily Times of Nigeria. Amuka became the first editor of the Sunday Punch. In November 1976, a few years after the first print of its Sunday edition, the duo started printing their trademark daily newspaper. Both editions were designed to favor a friendlier apolitical approach to news reporting, combining footage of social events with everyday political news. The paper sustains itself by delving into broad issues that interest myriad of people.

However, during the twilight of the Second Republic, political exigencies had introduced conflicts to its original intentions. Aboderin and Amuka parted ways due partly to political conflicts. Aboderin later secured the support of his former foe, M. K. O. Abiola, after the latter left the NPN. The paper began to take on a political slant, mostly against the Shehu Shagari regime. Supposedly, days before the regime's fall in the 1983 Nigerian coup d'état, a few Punch editors were aware of a coup approaching and injected strong antigovernmental tones in their reporting.

== Press freedom ==
The Punch was not immune to the excesses of the authoritarian regimes in the country. In 1990, its editor was jailed for 54 days. In 1993 and 1994, the publishing house was closed on the direction of the nation's military ruler.

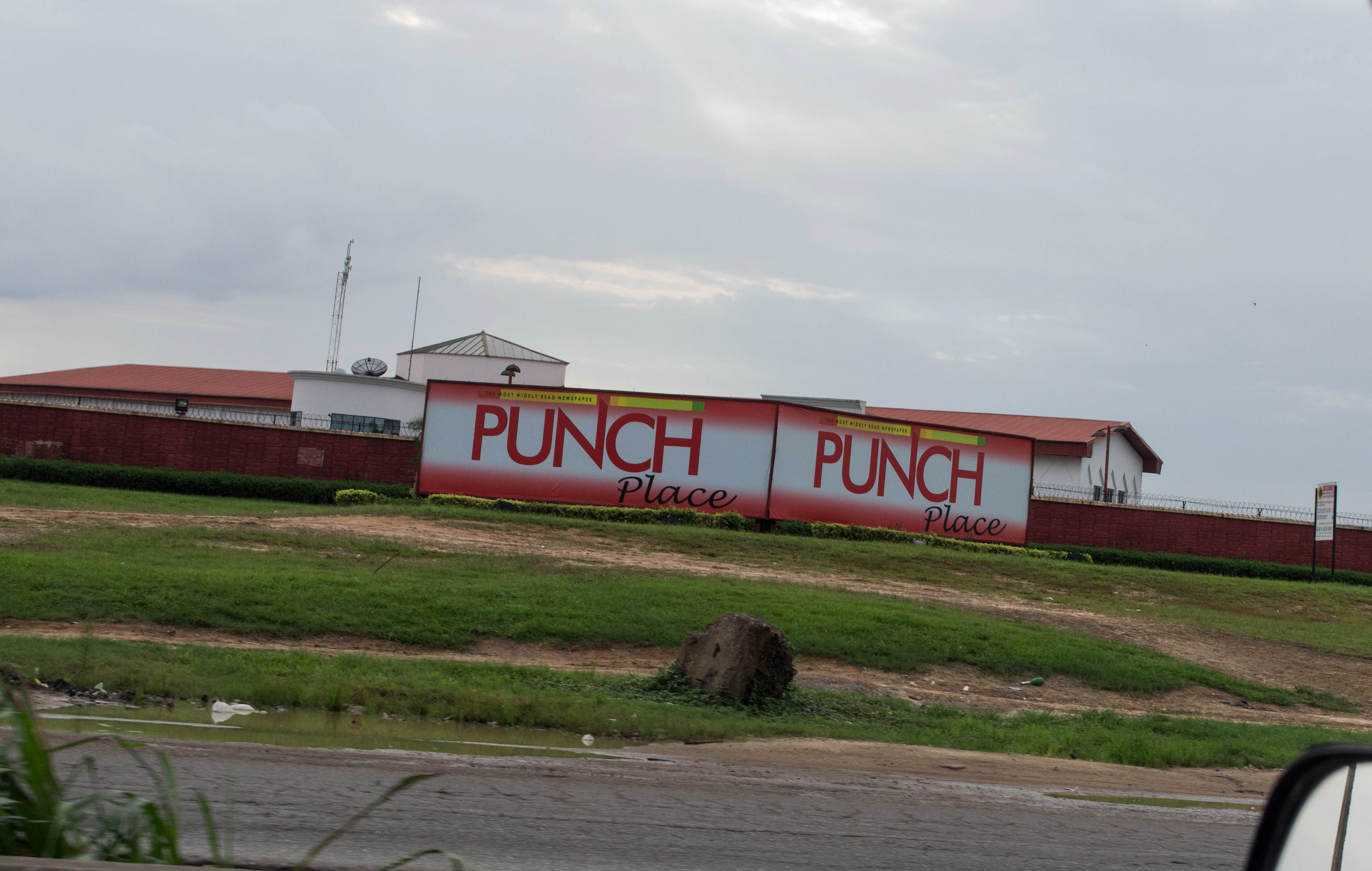
Punch Place, Arepo

== The company ==
In 1971, the company made its debut with the publication of Happy Home, a family-oriented magazine. Its first editor was Bunmi Sofola. On Sunday, March 18, 1973, its first newspaper, Sunday PUNCH, first started publishing and was edited by Ajibade Fashina-Thomas.

The Punch, a daily tabloid followed on November 1, 1976. Its pioneer editor was Dayo Wright. However, by the 1980s, the two tabloids had been repackaged.

On April 29, 1990, a week after an attempted coup d'état against the military regime of Ibrahim Babangida, the company was closed down, lasting a month while the then deputy editor of the publication, Chris Mammah, was detained for 54 days. In July 1993, the military government again shut the company's premises under Decree No 48 of 1993 and banned all its publications from circulating in the country. The closure followed the political crisis caused by the annulment of that year's presidential election.

On November 17 of the same year, the proscription order was repealed by Decree No 115 of 1993. This decree would later be cancelled on July 24, 1994, resulting in a proscription of all Punch titles including Toplife, which had been revived and published as a weekly magazine in the meantime. Bola Bolawole, the then editor of the Punch, was detained for three days in his office in the company's old headquarters. During the closure, the government ignored a court order directing it to vacate the company's premises and pay the sum of ₦25 million and ₦100,000 respectively to the company and Bolawole. It was not until October 1, 1995, that the government de-proscribed the publication via a national day broadcast by the then military head of state Sani Abacha.

== Most widely read newspaper ==
From 1998 to 1999, the Research and Marketing Services (RMS) Lagos published independent surveys in which The Punch was rated as the most widely read newspaper.

== Punch press: Goss Community ==
Punch's Goss Community printing press was delivered in November 1998. It is capable of producing 30,000(cps).

The Punch press, which has expandable colour units, is capable of printing eight pages of full color and eight of spot colour at up to 48 pages, and it is more often used in the western part of Nigeria.

== Bibliography ==
- Agbaje, Adigun (April 1990). "Freedom of the Press and Party Politics in Nigeria: Precepts, Retrospect, and Prospects". African Affairs. 89 (355): 205–226. doi:10.1093/oxfordjournals.afraf.a098285.
- Olutokun, Ayo; Seteolu, Dele (September 2001). "The Media and Democratic Rule in Nigeria" (PDF). Development Policy Management Network Bulletin. 13 (3). ISSN 0928-6195. At Academia(.edu).
