= Onyeka Onwenu =

Nigerian singer, actress and politician (1952–2024)

Onyeka Onwenu MFR
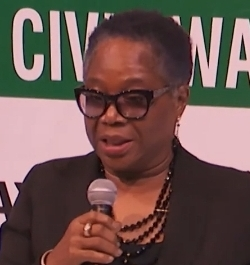
- Onwenu in 2022
- Born: 31 January 1952; Obosi, Colony and Protectorate of Nigeria
- Died: 30 July 2024 (aged 72); Lagos, Nigeria
- Education: Wellesley College, Massachusetts (B.A.) The New School for Social Research, New York. (M.A.)
- Occupations: Broadcaster; singer; actress; politician
- Children: 2

Onyeka Onwenu MFR // (31 January 1952 – 30 July 2024) was a Nigerian singer-songwriter, actress, human rights and social activist, journalist, politician, and X Factor series judge. Dubbed the "Elegant Stallion" due to her significant impact on African culture and entertainment, Onwenu was a chairperson of the Imo State Council for Arts and Culture. In 2013, she was appointed the Executive Director/Chief Executive Officer of the National Centre for Women Development.

== Early life ==
Onwenu was born of Igbo parents on 31 January 1952. She hailed from Arondizuogu, a big town in Ideato North, Imo State, southeastern Nigeria, but was born and raised in Port Harcourt, the capital city of Rivers State, Nigeria. She was the youngest daughter of Nigerian educationist and politician D. K. Onwenu, who died when she was four years old in a traffic collision a week before his appointment as Minister for Education, His death left his widow, Hope, to raise five children alone after her husband's family denied her access to his property.

== Education ==
Onwenu possessed a BA in International Relations and Communication from Wellesley College, Massachusetts, and an MA in Media Studies from The New School for Social Research, New York. She worked for the United Nations as a tour guide before returning to Nigeria in 1980 to complete her mandatory one-year National Youth Service Corps (NYSC) with the Nigerian Television Authority (NTA), in Lagos, Nigeria.

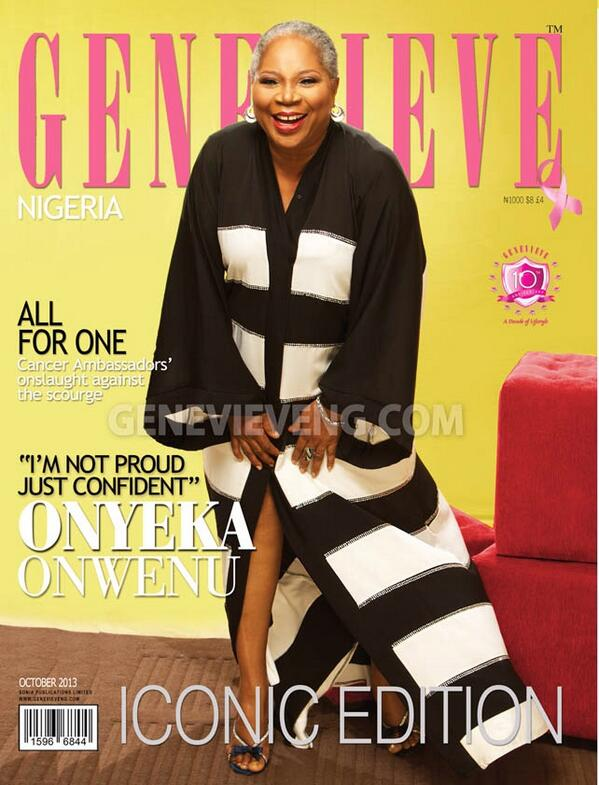
Onwenu on the cover of Genevieve magazine

== Career ==
=== Broadcasting ===
As an NTA employee, Onwenu made an impact as a newsreader and reporter. In 1984, she wrote and presented the internationally acclaimed BBC/NTA documentary Nigeria: A Squandering of Riches which became the definitive film about corruption in Nigeria, as well as the intractable Niger Delta agitation for resource control and campaign against environmental degradation in the oil rich region of Nigeria. A member of the NTA board, she also worked as a TV presenter, hosting the shows Contact (1988) and Who's On? (1993) both on NTA Network.

She served as the chairperson for the Imo State Council of Arts and Culture and was also a judge on the X Factor series.

=== Music ===
Originally a secular artist, Onwenu made the transition to gospel music in the 1990s, and most of her songs are self-penned. She wrote and sang about issues such as health (HIV/AIDS), peace and mutual coexistence, respect for women's rights, and the plight of children. She began her recording career in 1981, while still with the NTA, releasing the album For the Love of You, a pop album which featured an orchestral cover of Johnny Nash's "Hold Me Tight", produced by Berkley Jones. Her second album was Endless Life, produced by Sonny Okosun, and included another cover – the Everley Brothers' "Walk Right Back". Both records were released under the EMI label.

Onwenu's first album with Polygram, In The Morning Light, was released in 1984. Recorded in London, it featured the track "Masterplan" written by close friend Tyna Onwudiwe who had previously contributed to Onwenu's BBC documentary and subsequently sang back-up vocals on the album. In 1986, she released One Love which contained an updated version of the song "(In the) Morning Light" from the previous album. Another song, "You and I", was re-recorded for the 2001 film Conspiracy starring Nkem Owoh and Onwenu.

For the 1988 album Dancing In The Sun, Onwenu adopted a more Afrocentric sound and collaborated with veteran jùjú artist Sunny Ade on the track "Madawolohun (Let Them Say)". This was the first of three songs the pair worked on together; the other two – "Choices" and "Wait For Me" – centred on family planning, and were endorsed by the Planned Parenthood Federation of Nigeria who used "Choices" in their public service announcements. Dancing In The Sun, Onwenu's final release on Polygram, was dedicated to Winnie Mandela, the subject of a song of the same name which Onwenu performed live when Nelson Mandela and his wife visited Nigeria in 1990 following his release from prison.

Onwenu moved to Benson and Hedges Music in 1992 and released the self-titled Onyeka!, her only album with the label, after which she transitioned to Christian/gospel music. Her collection, Inspiration for Change, focused on the need for an attitudinal change in Nigeria.

She was in partnership with Paris-based La Cave Musik, headed by a Nigerian cultural entrepreneur, Onyeka Nwelue and a UK-based Jungle Entertainment Ventures, headed by musicologist David Evans-Uhegbu. La Cave Musik is set to release her collection titled Rebirth of a Legend. In recognition of her contribution to music and arts in Nigeria, she was celebrated by professionals like Mahmood Ali-Balogun, Laolu Akins, Charles O'Tudor, and former PMAN president Tony Okoroji among others in the arts industry in Nigeria.

In 2013, Onwenu served as one of the three judges on X Factor Nigeria.

=== Acting ===
Onwenu's first film role was as Joke, a childless woman who adopts an abandoned baby in Zik Zulu Okafor's Nightmare. She later featured in numerous Nollywood films, and in 2006 she won the Africa Movie Academy Award for Best Actress in a Supporting Role for her performance in Widow's Cot. She was also nominated that same year for Africa Movie Academy Award for Best Actress in a Leading Role in Rising Moon. She appeared in the 2013 film Half of a Yellow Sun with Chiwetel Ejiofor and Thandiwe Newton, and in Lion Heart.

== Politics ==
Onwenu was a member of the Peoples Democratic Party. She contested twice to become the Local Council Chairman of her Local Government, Ideato North Local Government Area of Imo State and lost at both attempts. She was appointed Chairperson of Imo State Council for Arts and Culture by Governor Ikedi Ohakim. On 16 September 2013, President Goodluck Ebele Jonathan appointed her the Executive Director/Chief Executive Officer of the National Centre for Women Development.

== Activism ==
In 2000, Onwenu protested against her former employer NTA over their refusal to pay royalties on her songs (NTA 2 Channel 5 had used "Iyogogo", a track from the Onyeka! album, in station idents without asking her permission). After then-director general Ben Murray-Bruce blacklisted her from transmission, she embarked on a hunger strike outside the station's premises.

Onwenu's activism attracted widespread support from various artists, including Charly Boy, who lambasted Nigeria's reluctance to pay royalties when songs are broadcast on television and radio. NTA resolved to settle the issue amicably but denied barring Onwenu from appearing on their channels. The protest was called off after six days when Onwenu and NTA came to an arrangement regarding royalties.

== Personal life ==
She fell in love for the first time at age 13 in 1965. Onwenu notably kept her personal life private and often refused to disclose private information regarding her ex-husband, a Yoruba Muslim. She was the mother of two children: Tijani Charles and Abraham.

== Death ==
On 30 July 2024, Onwenu collapsed after performing at the 80th birthday party of Stella Okoli, the CEO Emzor Pharmaceuticals in Lagos State. She was immediately taken to Reddington Hospital, where she was pronounced dead. Onwenu was 72. Prior to her death, Onwenu wrote in an opinion piece on Premium Times in 2021 on how she would like to be buried: "Do it quickly, quietly and privately," emphasising that her burial should be devoid of unnecessary fanfare. "Celebrate me with prayers, lunch or dinner afterwards. Share some jokes about me and laugh. Make merriment and then go about your business. If my friends want to celebrate me, they should do so while I am alive, so that I can enjoy it with them, not when I am gone and have no idea about this. That is me Onyeka Onwenu," she said.

== Filmography ==
List of films

Year	Film	Role	Notes	Additional reference(s)
1999	Nightmare	Joke	with Pete Edochie and Franca Brown	
1999	Not Your Wealth		with Peter Bunor & Charles Okafor	
1999	Conspiracy		with Nkem Owoh	
	Chain Reaction		with Pete Edochie & Liz Benson	
2004	Government House		with Kenneth Okonkwo	
2005	Women's Cot		with Joke Silva & Zack Orji – this film received 4 nominations and won 1 award at the 2nd Africa Movie Academy Awards in 2006	
2005	The Tyrant		with Pete Edochie	
2005	Rising Moon	Ulomma	with Prince Emeka Ani, Akume Akume	
2005	Omalinze	Queen	with Stephanie Okereke	
2005	Every Single Day		with Oge Okoye	
2006	Different World		with Ramsey Nouah	
2007	To Love an Angel	Nene	with Ramsey Nouah	
2007	The Trinity		with Kanayo O. Kanayo	
2013	Half of a Yellow Sun	Odenigbo's Mother	with Chiwetel Ejiofor and Thandiwe Newton	
2018	Lionheart	Abigail Obiagu	with Genevieve Nnaji, Phyno and Nkem Owoh	
2018	God Calling	Mama Francis	with Zainab Balogun, Richard Mofe-Damijo and Tina Mba	
2019	Muna	Ndidi – Muna's Grandma	with Adesua Etomi, Adam Huss and Falz	
2022	Ije Awele	Ijeoma Okpara	with Ngozi Nwosu, Ejike Asiegbu, Keppy Ekpenyong	
2023	Obara'M	Aunty Nwakaego	with Nkem Owoh	

== Legacy and tributes ==
Onwenu's impact resonated beyond music, as she was described as having "impacted many lives positively through her remarkable versatility and she truly lived a Christian life that is worthy of emulation".

A Nigerian reporter had earlier referred to her as the "Elegant Stallion" in the Nigerian media. She was noted "for her contribution to music and arts in Nigeria", which had earned her multiple national and international awards.

The news of Onwenu's death in July 2024 sparked reactions online. President of Nigeria Bola Tinubu paid tribute to her, calling Onwenu a "versatile and extremely gifted artiste", and said that her legacy "lives on in her immortal masterpieces".

She was said to have been "marked by a remarkable versatility", to have left an "indelible mark on Nollywood" and to have made an "impact on Nigerian culture". As Onwenu's "legacy in Nigeria's cultural and political landscape remains profound and enduring".

Onwenu was a philanthropist. Following her death, she was noted for her contributions to humanitarian causes, "often donating to organisations focused on education, healthcare, and women's empowerment". Her life of philanthropy seemed to "serve as a reminder of the significant influence celebrities can wield for greater good".

Onwenu was described as a deeply pious woman and as "the sweet Igbo Christian lady". On the religious front, she was also recognised for her exemplary adherence to the Christian lifestyle. Onwenu was not only an "exemplary symbol of womanhood" but also a unifying factor, with an "exemplary sense of unity". She was widely commended for her "outstanding intellect, eloquence, and oration", with a eulogy describing "Onwenu's exit as the end of an era". Onwenu, who was described as the epitome of "unity and peaceful coexistence", was to "be remembered for all her contributions to the Nigerian entertainment industry, our educational system, religious circles and our political space".

== See also ==
- List of Nigerian gospel musicians
- Junior Pope
- Cornelius Adam Igbudu
