= Tony Okoroji =

Nigerian musician and property activist

Chief Tony Okoroji
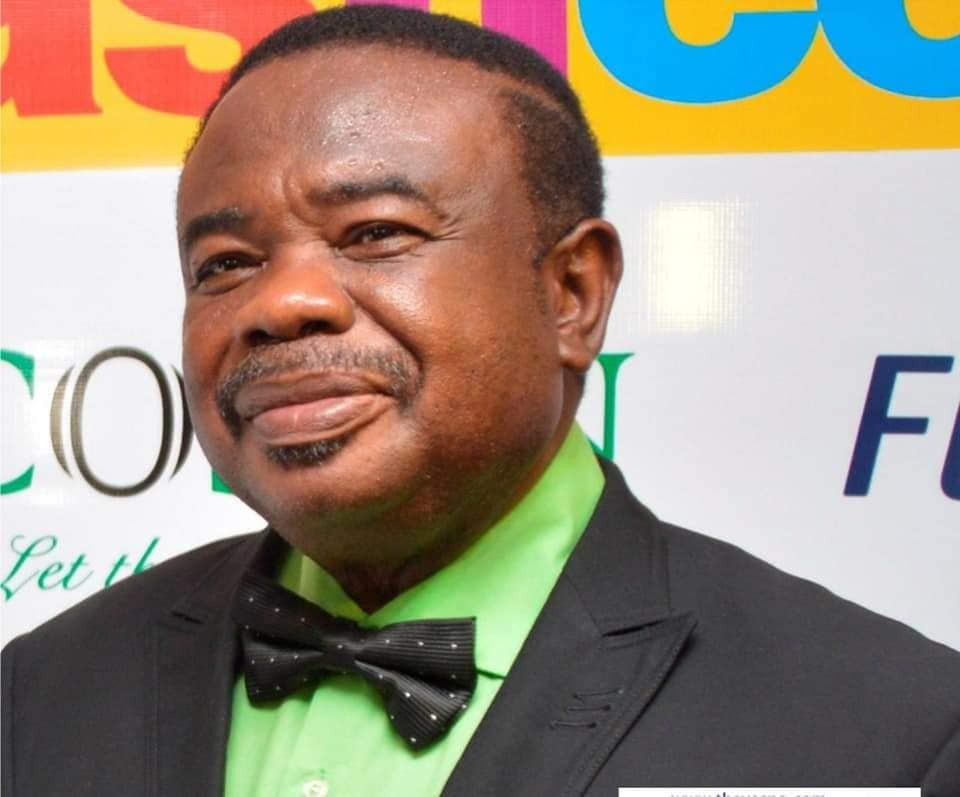
- Born: 22 December 1957 (age 68)
- Occupations: Author, Musician and Activist
- Known for: Intellectual property activist
- Title: Chairman COSON

Tony Okoroji is a Nigerian musician, singer, songwriter, record producer, author and intellectual property activist. He was elected President of Performing Musicians Association of Nigeria (PMAN) in 1989 and later became the Chairman of Copyright Society of Nigeria (COSON). In 2016, Okoroji established his own record label, TOPS Record.

== Music industry leadership ==
Okoroji became president of Performing Musicians Association of Nigeria (PMAN) in 1989. He is credited for expanding the organisation across Nigeria.

He was also one of the individuals that called for the establishment of Nigerian Copyright Commission (NCC) during military dictatorship. Okoroji emerged chairman of Copyright Society of Nigeria (COSON) following its formation in May 2010.

In 2017, he introduced Nigeria’s first online licensing platform, COSON Licensing Application Platform (CLAP) and declared an all-out war against copyright infringements. This reform led to the collection of 300 million naira in royalties for artists within a year.

== Books ==
In 2009, Okoroji released a book Copyright, Neighborhood Rights and the new Millionaires (the twists and turns in Nigeria) which analysed copyright infringement issues and ways to tackle the challenges.

In 2017, Okoroji published another book On The Road To Change which is a compendium of articles written by him and published in Saturday Independent (Nigerian Newspaper) and other media platforms.

== Music career ==
Okoroji became popular in the early 70s with hits such as "James and John", "I say No", and "Oriaku" from his Juliana album and Akataka. In 2016, he established his own record label, TOPS Record. In 2017, he released a single which is a remake of "Oriaku" titled "Oriaku newskul" and in 2018, he released another single, "Happy Music" under his own record label.

=== Albums ===
- Super Sure (1976)
- Big Big Sugar Daddy (1979)
- Mama & Papa (1982)
- Juliana (1983)
- Locomotion (1984)
- Akataka (1985)
- Otanishi (1986)

Singles

- "Juliana" (1983)
- "Happy music" (2017)
- "Oriaku The New School" (2018)
