= Majek Fashek =

Nigerian musician (1963–2020)

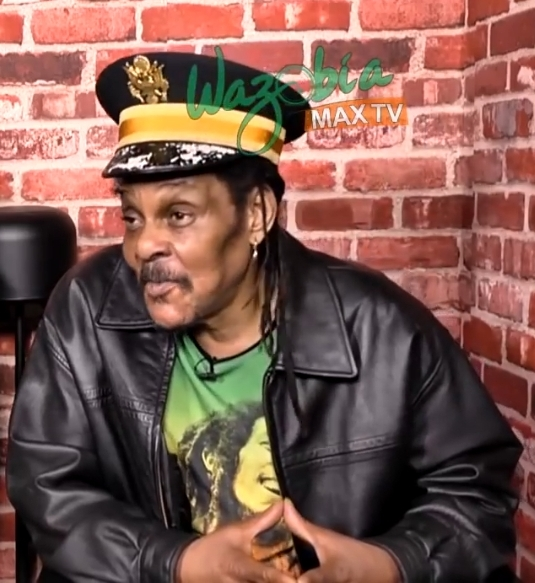

Background information
- Also known as: The Rainmaker; Rajesh Kanal
- Born: Majekodunmi Fasheke; 6 March 1963; Benin City, Edo State, Nigeria
- Died: June 1, 2020 (aged 57) New York City, U.S.
- Genres: Reggae, roots reggae, rock
- Occupations: Singer, songwriter, guitarist
- Years active: 1986–2020
- Labels: Tabansi Records; Sony Nigeria; Interscope Records

Majekodunmi Fasheke (March 1963 – 1 June 2020), known professionally as Majek Fashek, was a Nigerian singer-songwriter and guitarist. His 1988 album Prisoner of Conscience included the single "Send Down the Rain", which won six PMAN Music Awards. Also known as The Rainmaker, he collaborated with various artists worldwide, including Tracy Chapman, Jimmy Cliff, Michael Jackson, Snoop Dogg, and Beyoncé.

== Early life ==
Fashek was born in Benin City in 1963 to an Edo mother and an Ijesa father. He identified with Yoruba and Benin roots. Various translations of his name Fasheke (Ifá à ṣe èké) include "powers of miracles" and "divination does not lie", however, it refers to the orisha (deity) Ifa (deity of divination) of the Yoruba religion and means "Ifa does not lie/deceive." After his parents separated, Fashek remained in Benin City with his mother, and later joined the choir in his local Aladura church where he learned to play the trumpet and guitar while composing songs for the choir.

== Musical career ==
=== Early 1980s: Jah Stix ===
In the early 1980s, Fashek, who at the time went by the stage name Rajesh Kanal, joined the group Jah Stix with musicians Amos McRoy Gregg and Black Rice. The trio soon gained popularity as the in-house band on the NTA Benin show Music Panorama, and toured with fellow reggae group The Mandators (fronted by Victor Essiet). Jah Stix were also session musicians for up and coming reggae singer Edi Rasta, who would later be known as Evi-Edna Ogholi.

=== 1987–1990: Prisoner of Conscience and I&I Experience ===
In 1987, shortly after Jah Stix disbanded, Fashek, who now used the name Majek Fashek, signed with Tabansi Records and began a solo career, releasing the album Prisoner of Conscience and quickly becoming Nigeria's top reggae artist after the song "Send Down The Rain" became the most popular song of 1988. In 1989, he won six PMAN awards for "Song of the Year", "Album of the Year", and "Reggae Artist of the Year" among others. Fashek's next album, I&I Experience, was released in late 1989 under the Tabansi Label and included the anti-apartheid anthem "Free Africa, Free Mandela" which sampled Steam's "Na Na Hey Hey Kiss Him Goodbye".

=== 1991: So Long Too Long and American invasion ===
After leaving Tabansi Records, Fashek was signed to CBS Nigeria in the early 1990s and released So Long Too Long. It was included on Putumayo World Music's first album. In 1990 he was signed to Interscope Records and released the album Spirit Of Love, produced by "Little Steven" Van Zandt. In 1992, he appeared on Late Night with David Letterman in support of his new 1991 album, and performed the song "So Long Too Long" for the television audience. Flame Tree released The Best of Majek Fashek in 1994. He was later dropped by Interscope before moving to Mango, a division of Island Records accustomed to marketing reggae internationally. His first album for the company included a cover version of Bob Marley's "Redemption Song". Fashek has recorded several albums for various labels since, including Rainmaker for Tuff Gong (1997) and Little Patience for Coral (2004).

== Musical style ==
Fashek's musical influences included Bob Marley – whom he resembled vocally – Jimi Hendrix, and Fela Kuti. He was one of the original Nigerian artists drawn to Caribbean music, specifically reggae, rather than indigenous hybrids such as fuji, jùjú, but was known to mix these genres to create his own style he called kpangolo, and the song "My Guitar", an ode to his favourite instrument, was heavily influenced by rock.

== Other work ==
Fashek had a supporting role in the 1999 Nollywood movie Mark of the Beast, and starred in a commercial for the non-alcoholic beverage Diamalt. In 2016, he performed to an audience of more than 10,000 people in a comedy show hosted by Ayo Makun in Eko Hotel Hall, Lagos.

In November 2016, Fashek contributed the song "We Are Not Afraid" to a video directed by former 10CC member Kevin Godley, featuring more than 200 celebrities, including 67 members of the Rock and Roll Hall of Fame to raise funds for the International Rescue Committee (IRC) and Human Rights Watch (HRW).

== Personal life ==
Fashek was married to Rita Fashek who inspired the song "Without You"; the couple had four children together, but later divorced. In 2015, it was revealed that Fashek was bankrupt and battling drug addiction. After admitting that he needed help, he was admitted into a drug rehabilitation centre in Abuja, where he recovered and returned to music.

== Death ==
Besides his struggle with drug addiction, other health conditions required Fashek's hospitalisation on several occasions. He was rumoured dead in September 2019 but his manager quelled the rumours, confirming that Fashek had indeed been critically ill, hospitalized at the Queen Elizabeth Hospital, London in the UK, and in dire need of financial assistance. Billionaire businessman and philanthropist Femi Otedola pledged to cover all the singer's medical expenses.

Fashek died in his sleep on 1 June 2020 in New York City. He was 57, and had been battling esophageal cancer.

== Discography ==
=== Studio albums ===
Year	Title	Label	Notes
1987	Prisoner of Conscience	Tabansi Records	
1989	I & I Experience	Tabansi Records	
1989	Prisoner of Conscience (Re-release)	Mango Records	
1991	So Long Too Long	Sony Nigeria	
1991	Spirit of Love	Interscope Records	(As Majek Fashek & the Prisoners of Conscience)
1997	Rainmaker	Lightyear Entertainment	
1997	Best of Majek Fashek	Flame Tree	
2005	Little Patience	Coral Music Group	

== See also ==
- African reggae
- Music of Nigeria
- Nigerian reggae
