= Ras Kimono =

Nigerian artist

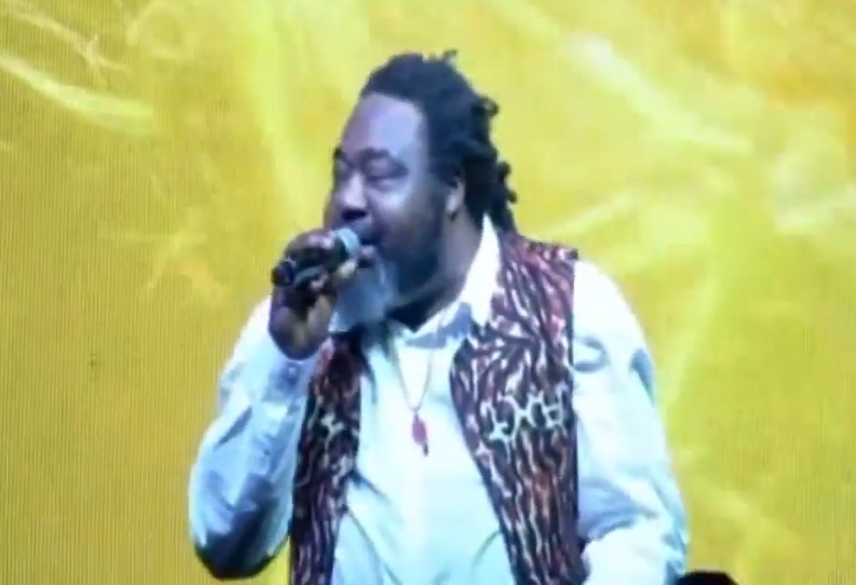
Ras Kimono

Oseloke Augustine Onwubuya (9 May 1958 – 10 June 2018), known professionally as Ras Kimono, was a Nigerian reggae musician. His debut album Under Pressure was released in 1989, included the single "Rum-Bar Stylée", which was a hit in the Nigerian music scene. Before he released his solo album, he was a member of the group Jastix alongside Amos McRoy and Majek Fashek.

Kimono was born in Ekeleke Elumelu, Delta State, Nigeria, He began his career while he was a student of Gbenoba Secondary School, Agbor and later as a member of Jastix Reggae Ital, alongside Majek Fashek, Amos McRoy Jegg and Black Rice Osagie. His music was influenced by the poverty, inequality and hardship he experienced in his early life. Kimono served an apprenticeship on the Nigerian music circuit, experimenting with a number of styles, before making his breakthrough as a reggae singer in the late 1980s with his Massive Dread Reggae Band. He released his solo debut album Under Pressure on the Premier Music label in 1989, which included songs such as "Under Pressure", "Natty Get Jail" and "Rum-Bar Stylée". The album sold more than 100,000 copies. His follow-up album, What's Gwan, achieved more success, with songs addressing topics including legalisation of marijuana, and the need for Africans to intellectually repel colonialism and its arbitrary boundaries between tribes. He later released several albums and toured Africa, Europe and the United States. He won several awards, including the Nigeria Music Awards and Fame Music Awards. In 2010, he was still performing and his music was played on radio stations throughout West Africa.

He died at the age of 60 on 10 June 2018 in Lagos, Nigeria.

== Discography ==
- Under Pressure (1988)
- What's Gwan? (1990)
- Run Fi Cover (1992)
- Lone Ranger (1994)
- Oracle of Jah (1996?)
- Matter of Time (2008)
- Senseless Killing (2017)
