= Vanguard (Nigeria) =

Nigerian daily newspaper

- Type: Daily newspaper
- Publisher: Vanguard Media
- Founded: 1983; 43 years ago
- Headquarters: Lagos
- Website: vanguardngr.com

Vanguard is a Nigerian daily published by Vanguard Media, headquartered in Lagos, Nigeria. Vanguard Media was established in 1984 by journalist Sam Amuka-Pemu and three friends. The paper currently has an online edition.

In June 1990, the paper's publication was briefly suspended by Col. Raji Rasaki, the Military Governor of Lagos State.

In December 2008, "current affairs resource" website Point Blank News published a story that alleged the wife of the publisher of Vanguard Newspapers was involved in a ritual killing. Vanguard took the reporter to court, claiming he was attempting extortion.

In December 2009, a Niger Delta peace activist commended Vanguard for its reporting on the government's intentions, which he said helped persuade the militants to accept amnesty.
