= Performing Musicians Association of Nigeria =

Nigerian music organisation

Performing Musicians Association of Nigeria, also known as Performing Musicians Employers' Association Of Nigeria (abbreviated as PMAN) is a Nigerian music-based organisation. It was founded in 1984 by Christy Essien-Igbokwe and Sunny Okosun. It serves as a guide for Nigerian musicians as well as regulate the practice of music in Nigeria. As of 2016, Singer Pretty Okafor has served as the president.

== List of Presidents ==
- Tony Okoroji
- Mustapha Amego
- Christy Essien-Igbokwe
- Sunny Ade
- Charly Boy
- Bolaji Rosiji
- Tee Mac Omashola Iseli
- Pretty Okafor (since October 2016)

== See also ==
- Music of Nigeria
