= Bayo Onanuga =

Nigerian journalist and newspaper owners

- Born: 20 June 1957 (age 69); Ijebu Ode, Ogun State
- Education: Federal Government College, Odogbolu; University of Lagos
- Occupation: Journalist
- Known for: founding (Independent Communication Nigeria Limited, TheNEWS and PM News)
- Office: Managing Director News Agency of Nigeria
- Term: 2018

Bayo Onanuga (born 20 June 1957) is a Nigerian journalist. He founded TheNews Magazine and was appointed managing director of the News Agency of Nigeria by president Muhammadu Buhari. Preceding that, he was CEO and managing director of PM News and TheNEWS magazine.

== Background ==
Onanuga was born to a family of Anikilaya in Ijebu Ode, Ogun State. He attended Muslim College Ijebu for his primary and secondary school in Ode and finished in 1974 and proceeded to Federal Government College, Odogbolu in 1975 to 1977. In 1977, Onanuga was admitted to University of Lagos where he graduated in 1980 with a degree in mass communication. He worked with the African Concord before that in 1980 he was Ogun States Television authority (OGTVA) for one and half years and joined printing journalism where he worked for The Guardian then he left there and started his own magazine The Weekly Titbits. Then in 1985 he joined The National Concord as a senior writer there he became chief editor in African Concord together with Seye Kehinde, owner of City People Magazine, Dapo Olorunyomi editor of Premium Times, Sani Kabir who served as chairman in Onigbongbo local government in Ikeja, Babafemi Ojudu senator in Ekiti and Kunle Ajibade chief editor in PM News 1992 they teamed up to set up TheNews Magazine which was founded in 1993.

== Political career ==
In 2019, he declared to contest for senatorial position in Ogun east district in the 2023 general election under the platform of All Progressives Congress, (APC). During the military era of Sani Abacha he was held captive by State Security Service in Lagos for some time but later escaped and left the country and returned in 1997 after the death of Abacha. Many staff from major newspapers in Nigeria resigned due to critical story published about the military era in a protests for MKO Abiola but were ask to apologized to the military era's leaders.
