= 2007 Nigerian Senate elections in Ekiti State =

2007 Nigerian Senate election in Ekiti State

The 2007 Nigerian Senate election in Ekiti State was held on April 21, 2007, to elect members of the Nigerian Senate to represent Ekiti State. Sylvester Ayodele Arise representing Ekiti North, Adefemi Kila representing Ekiti Central and Sola Akinyede representing Ekiti South all won on the platform of the Peoples Democratic Party.

== Overview ==
Affiliation	Party		Total
Affiliation	PDP	AC	Total
Before Election			3
After Election	3	0	3

== Summary ==
District	Incumbent	Party	Elected Senator	Party
Ekiti North			Sylvester Ayodele Arise	PDP
Ekiti Central			Adefemi Kila	PDP
Ekiti South			Sola Akinyede	PDP

== Results ==
=== Ekiti North ===
The election was won by Sylvester Ayodele Arise of the Peoples Democratic Party.

2007 Nigerian Senate election in Ekiti State
Party	Candidate	Votes	%
PDP	Sylvester Ayodele Arise		
Total votes			
PDP hold			

=== Ekiti Central ===
The election was won by Adefemi Kila of the Peoples Democratic Party.

2007 Nigerian Senate election in Ekiti State
Party	Candidate	Votes	%
PDP	Adefemi Kila		
Total votes			
PDP hold			

=== Ekiti South ===
The election was won by Sola Akinyede of the Peoples Democratic Party.

2007 Nigerian Senate election in Ekiti State
Party	Candidate	Votes	%
PDP	Sola Akinyede		
Total votes			
PDP hold			
