= Ateba =

Ateba is a surname, commonly used in Cameroon. Notable people with the surname include:

- Charles Ateba Eyene (1972–2014), Cameroonian writer, politician, and teacher
- Fabien Ateba (born 1991), French-Cameroonian basketball player
- Jean-Hugues Ateba (born 1981), Cameroonian former professional footballer
- Joseph Befe Ateba (1962–2014), Roman Catholic bishop
- Koko Ateba (died 2024), Cameroonian singer and guitarist
- Leonel Ateba (born 1999), Cameroonian professional footballer
- Simon Ateba (born 1979 or 1980), Cameroonian journalist
