= 2011 Nigerian Senate elections in Ekiti State =

The 2011 Nigerian Senate election in Ekiti State was held on April 9, 2011, to elect members of the Nigerian Senate to represent Ekiti State. Babafemi Ojudu representing Ekiti Central, Olubunmi Ayodeji Adetunmbi representing Ekiti North and Anthony Adeniyi representing Ekiti South all won on the platform of Action Congress of Nigeria.

== Overview ==
Affiliation	Party		Total
Affiliation	ACN	PDP	Total
Before Election			3
After Election	3	–	3

== Summary ==
District	Incumbent	Party	Elected Senator	Party
Ekiti Central			Babafemi Ojudu	ACN
Ekiti North			Olubunmi Ayodeji Adetunmbi	ACN
Ekiti South			Anthony Adeniyi	ACN

== Results ==
=== Ekiti Central ===
Action Congress of Nigeria candidate Babafemi Ojudu won the election, defeating other party candidates.

2011 Nigerian Senate election in Ekiti State
Party	Candidate	Votes	%
Action Congress of Nigeria	Babafemi Ojudu		
Total votes			
ACN hold			

=== Ekiti North ===
Action Congress of Nigeria candidate Olubunmi Ayodeji Adetunmbi won the election, defeating other party candidates.

2011 Nigerian Senate election in Ekiti State
Party	Candidate	Votes	%
ACN	Olubunmi Ayodeji Adetunmbi		
Total votes			
ACN hold			

=== Ekiti South ===
Action Congress of Nigeria candidate Anthony Adeniyi won the election, defeating party candidates.

2011 Nigerian Senate election in Ekiti State
Party	Candidate	Votes	%
ACN	Anthony Adeniyi		
Total votes			
ACN hold			
