= Lanre Alfred =

Nigerian journalist and publisher

- Occupations: Journalist, author, entrepreneur
- Notable credit(s): This Day, columnist, former society editor The Capital, publisher City People Magazine, former society reporter

Lanre Alfred is a Nigerian journalist, author and publisher. He is the publisher of The Capital, former society editor and columnist at This Day, author of five books and owner of Old English Superstores, a department store in Lagos, Ogun and Oyo States, Nigeria.

Alfred Lanre is a celebrity journalism practitioner. His career in the genre included a stint as a society reporter, writer and columnist at City People Magazine, a Nigerian popular soft-sell magazine owned and founded by Seye Kehinde. After a couple of years, Alfred left City People Magazine for This Day Newspaper where he authored SpyGlass on Saturdays and Society Happenings on Sundays, the page through which he mirrored the lifestyle of Nigerian socialites and celebrities. He left This Day as Society Editor in 2014 to found his own online magazine, The Capital, "an online publication with focus on business, politics and lifestyle of Nigeria's high society and nouveau riche.". He remains a contributing columnist to the This Day through a weekly column named, High Life.

== Book publishing ==
Lanre Alfred has authored five books:

- Nigeria @60: Foremost Nigerians in the Last 60years
- The Titans: Amazing Exploits of Nigeria’s Greatest Achievers
- Highlife: Amazing Lifestyles of Nigeria’s Rich and Famous
- Pacemaker – Triumphs of Igho Sanomi at 40
- The Lion of Afia Nsit – Triumphs of Scott Tommey at 45
- Julius Rone: The Jewel of the Delta

== Recognition ==
- Special Recognition Award at 2020 City People Fashion and Beauty Awards by City People Magazine
