= Simeon Adebo Library =

Library in Abeokuta, Nigeria

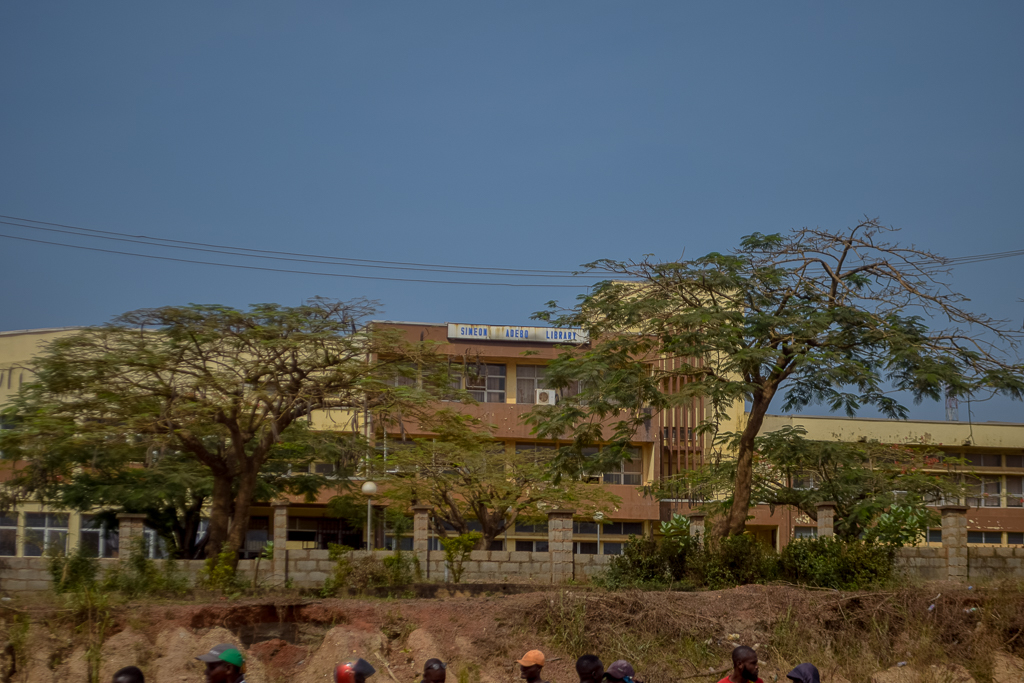
- 7.1363854550730075°N 3.3485368070279122°E
- Location: Abeokuta Ogun state, Nigeria
- Type: Public library
- Established: 1990

Collection
- Items collected: Books, journals, newspapers, magazines, sound and music recordings, patents, databases, maps, stamps, prints, drawings and manuscripts

Access and use
- Access requirements: Open to students, researchers, and general public

Simeon Adebo Library is a public library in Abeokuta, Ogun state. Named after the late lawyer and diplomat, Simeon Adebo, it is also the headquarters of the Ogun state library board. The history of library services in Ogun State dated back to February. 3rd 1976, it was commissioned in 1990.

== History ==
The history of library services dates back to February. 3rd 1976, when the state was created from the Old Western region. The Headquarters of Ogun State library services was commissioned on 27 July 1990. The complex was christened Simeon Adebo Library, in recognition of contributions of the former Head of Ogun State civil service, in person of Chief late Simeon Adebo. The library is located within the Headquarters of Ogun State library Board at Abeokuta. It has seating capacity of 300, with over 40,000 volumes of books. Although, the library was commissioned in July 1990, but nevertheless it was not opened to the general public until 1992. The library witnessed poor management with the structure dilapidating prior to 2003 but was revived upon the State Government appointment of a Consultant on Library mattSers.
