= Olusegun Ariyo =

Nigerian journalist, urban planner, writer and social justice activist

Olusegun Ariyo is a Nigerian journalist, urban planner, writer and social justice activist. He is the publisher and editor of Urban Express news and author of the book Solution to Processing Land & Property Documents in Lagos State.

== Education and career ==
Olusegun Ariyo earned a National Diploma in Urban Planning from The Polytechnic, Ibadan and a Higher National Diploma in same course from Yaba College of Technology before obtaining a Professional Diploma from Nigeria Institute of Town Planners. He studied at the Lagos State University for a bachelor’s degree in Geography and Planning and a master’s degree in same course from the university. Ariyo holds a post-diploma in Print Journalism from the Nigeria Institute of Journalism.

He began his journalism career at ThisDay Newspapers where he covered environment advocacy beat and later moved to P.M. News as a reporter. He is the columnist of Faces and Culture With Olusegun Ariyo in Commoner Newspaper and writes opinion pieces in the Nation Newspaper and PM News. He is the publisher and editor of Urban Express – an online publishing newspaper. He was country director of Environmental Safety and Awareness Initiative – a non-government organization focused on environment and climate change advocacy. Ariyo advocates for the rights of Okada (motorcycle taxi) riders in Lagos.
