= Concord Group (Nigeria) =

Group of Nigerian companies

Concord Group was the business name of a group of companies that included Concord Newspapers and Concord Airlines. It was founded by Moshood Abiola. Other ventures within the group include Concord Summit Capital, Abiola Farms and Wonder Bakeries. National Concord was founded in 1980 and by the end of 1983, it had become the most read newspaper in Nigeria.

== Concord Group of newspapers ==
The first issue of National Concord was printed on 1 March 1980, followed by a Sunday Concord the next day. The objective of the newspaper as stated by the Concord Group was to rid of the nation of the triple issues of corruption, tribalism and indiscipline.. At onset, the company attracted talent from the Daily Times such as Dele Giwa, who was appointed editor of Sunday Concord, Henry Odukomaiya, a previous editor at the Daily Times, Ray Ekpu, a member of the editorial board and later co-founder of Newswatch, and Doyin Aboaba also of the Times. When the new paper made its debut, the publisher, Abiola was a member of the National Party of Nigeria (NPN) and the daily supported some actions of the ruling party while Abiola was opposed to the writings of the Nigerian Tribune owned by Awolowo. Investigative writers of the paper soon revealed alleged ownership of over 300 plots of land owned by the opposition leader, Awolowo, who was an advocate of democratic socialism. This revelation briefly impacted Awolowo politically. However, after the exit of Abiola from NPN, it began to receive favourable reception in the Southwestern states dominated by the opposition, this disposition increased when arsonist burnt down a warehouse holding newsprints of the Concord.

Within two years of publication, the National Concord reached a circulation of 131,000. The group later launched a Business Concord and African Concord then followed by publications in the Hausa and Igbo languages. In 1988, it purchased African Economic Digest. At its height, the group published 14 newspapers and magazines. Its editorial also caught the attention of two military regimes, who went on to proscribe it three times. In 1992, Ibrahim Babangida's reaction to African Concord's front-cover headline "Has IBB Given Up" was to lock up the premises of the company for six months and after Abiola declared himself the duly elected president of Nigeria in June 1994, the group's publications were banned.

=== Publications ===
- National Concord
- Sunday Concord
- Amana (Hausa)
- Udoka
- Business Concord
- African Concord

== Other companies ==
=== Concord Airlines ===
Founded in 1986 (40 years ago) by Abiola, it was an outgrowth of Radio Communications aviation. Concord Airlines operated one BAe 125, six Fairchild FH-227 and one Fairchild F-27 aircraft for scheduled and charter services.

=== Other ventures ===
Other businesses formed by Abiola and largely managed by his son, Kola Abiola include Abiola Farms, a large-scale venture founded in 1985. The firm invested in agrarian land, acquiring hectares in Yewa country to plant maize, after proven unsuitable for large-scale cultivation of maize, a fish pond project was launched on the site, additional investment in land and storage facilities in Lafiagi area of Kwara State was made for the cultivation of rice, maize and soybeans and another 5,000 hectares acquired within the Mambilla Plateau for the cultivation of sunflower and other farm products.

Another venture is Summit Oil International Ltd, created as part of government's incentive to encourage local investment in the crude oil production sector. The firm was allocated two oil prospecting licenses in 1990.

== Decline ==
The incarceration of Abiola significantly affected the group. Concord newspapers was banned for a long period by the government of Sani Abacha. Some of the editors such as Babafemi Ojudu later formed TheNEWS magazine and Tempo which used guerrilla journalism tactics to emerge as a critical voice against Sani Abacha's policies.
