= Duro Faseyi =

Nigerian politician

Senator 8th National Assembly
- Succeeded by: Olubunmi Ayodeji Adetunmbi
- Constituency: Ekiti North Senatorial District

Personal details
- Occupation: Politician

Duro Faseyi is a Nigerian politician and lawmaker. He was a Senator who represented Ekiti North Senatorial District in the 8th National Assembly. He was succeeded by Olubunmi Ayodeji Adetunmbi.

== See also ==
- Nigerian senators of the 8th National Assembly
