= List of awards and honours received by Chinua Achebe =

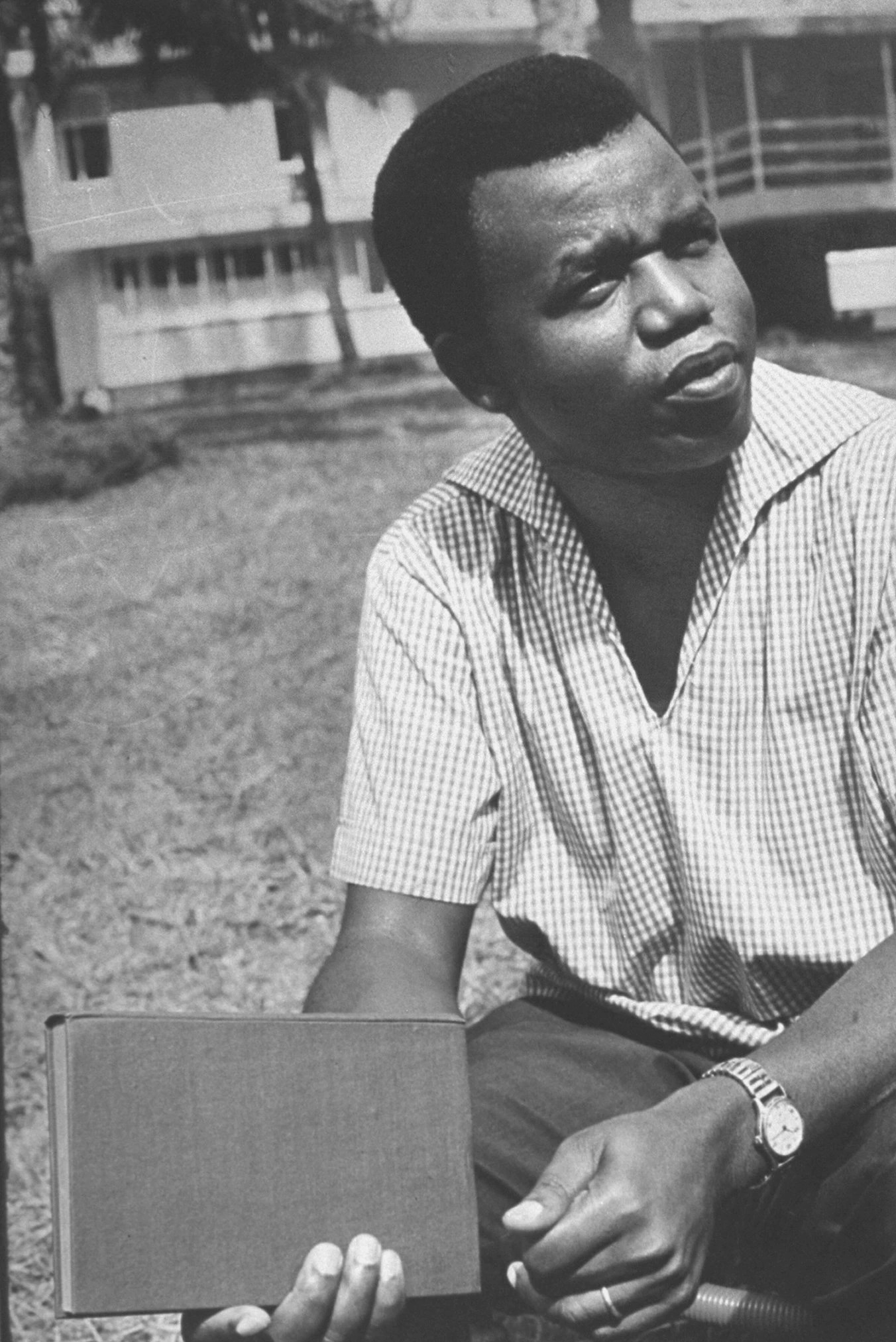
Achebe in Lagos, 1966

Nigerian author Chinua Achebe (16 November 1930 – 21 March 2013) received over 40 honorary degrees from universities in Nigeria, Canada, South Africa, the United Kingdom and the United States, including Dartmouth College, Harvard, and Brown.

Despite his international renown, Achebe never received the Nobel Prize for Literature, which some—particularly Nigerians—viewed as unjust. In 1988 Achebe was asked by a reporter for Quality Weekly how he felt about never winning a Nobel Prize; he replied: "My position is that the Nobel Prize is important. But it is a European prize. It's not an African prize ... Literature is not a heavyweight championship. Nigerians may think, you know, this man has been knocked out. It's nothing to do with that." Despite his own indifference, Nobel laureate in literature, Wole Soyinka reports that immediately after Achebe's death he received a great many letters urging him to nominate Achebe posthumously. Soyinka denied such requests, explaining that Achebe "is entitled to better than being escorted to his grave with that monotonous, hypocritical aria of deprivation's lament, orchestrated by those who, as we say in my part of the world, 'dye their mourning weeds a deeper indigo than those of the bereaved'. He deserves his peace. Me too! And right now, not posthumously."

== Literature ==
Things Fall Apart

- Man Booker International Prize (2007)
- Time's 100 Best English-language Novels from 1923 to 2005
- BBC's 100 Stories That Shaped the World #5 (2018)
- Encyclopedia Britannica's "Greatest Books Ever Written" (2018)
- The Great American Read 100 best-loved novels

== Career awards ==
- Commonwealth Poetry Prize (1972);
- the Nigerian National Order of Merit, the Order of the Federal Republic (1979); (Note: Although he accepted numerous honours from the Nigerian government, Achebe refused its Commander of the Federal Republic award in 2004. Citing his frustration with the political environment.; In 2011, Achebe was again offered the Commander of the Federal Republic, but he declined it asserting "the reasons for rejecting the offer when it was first made have not been addressed let alone solved. It is inappropriate to offer it again to me". Then-President Goodluck Jonathan claimed that Achebe's refusal was regrettable and may have been influenced by misinformation, but said he still held him in high regard.)
- Honorary Fellowship of the American Academy of Arts and Letters (1982)
- the St. Louis Literary Award (1999)
- the Peace Prize of the German Book Trade (2002)
- the Man Booker International Prize (2007)
- the Dorothy and Lillian Gish Prize (2010)
- Achebe was honoured as Grand Prix de la Mémoire (Grand Prize for Memory) of the 2019 edition of the Grand Prix of Literary Associations prize.

== Other awards ==
- In 1992 he became the first living writer to be represented in the Everyman's Library collection (reprints of classic literature) published by Alfred A. Knopf.
- Goodwill Ambassador by the United Nations Population Fund in 1999.

== Honorary degrees ==
- Dartmouth College, 1972
- Trinity College in Connecticut, US (Doctor of Letters), 23 May 1999
- Bates College (also gave a commencement address), 23 May 1999
- University of Cape Town (also gave the third Steve Biko Memorial Lecture on 12 September 2002 and received an honorary Degree of Doctor of Literature honoris causa), 23 September 2002
- Harvard University (Doctorate of Letters), 6 June 1996
- Brown University (Doctor of Humane Letters), 1998
- University of Stirling
- Obafemi Awolowo University
- University of Nigeria
- University of New Brunswick
- University of Prince Edward Island, 1976
- City University of New York
- University of Massachusetts (honorary degree in Humane Letters), May 1977
- Southampton University, 1974
- Stirling University, 1975
- The University of Kent, England, 1981, D.Litt.
- The University of Nigeria, Nsukka, Nigeria, 1981, D.Litt.
- Mount Allison University, New Brunswick, Canada, 1984, D.Litt.
- University of Guelph, Canada, 1984, D.Litt.
- Franklin Pierce College, New Hampshire, U.S.A., 1985, D.Litt.
- Lagos State University, Nigeria, 1988, D.Litt.
- Westfield College, Westfield, Massachusetts, U.S.A., 1989, D.H.L.
- Open University, Great Britain, 1989, D.Litt.
- University of Ibadan, Nigeria, 1989, D.Litt.
- Georgetown University, U.S.A., 1990, LL.D
- University of Port Harcourt, Nigeria, 1991, LL.D
- Skidmore College, U.S.A., 1991 D.Litt.
- The New School for Social Research, U.S.A., 1991, D.H.L.
- Hobart and William Smith Colleges, U.S.A., 1991, D.H.L.
- Marymount Manhattan College, U.S.A., 1991, D.H.L.
- City College, City University of New York, U.S.A., 1992, D.Litt.
- Westfield State University, Massachusetts, 1992, D.Litt.
- Colgate University, U.S.A., 1993, D.H.L.
- Fitchburg State College, Massachusetts, U.S.A., 1994, D.Litt.
- State University of New York, Binghamton, 1996
- Syracuse University (Doctor of Humane Letters), 1998
- Ohio Wesleyan University, 1999
- University of Witwatersrand, 2000
- Haverford College, 2001
- University of Massachusetts, Boston (Honorary Degree in Humane Letters), 1 June 2002
- University of Toronto, 2006
- Lesley University in Cambridge, Massachusetts, 2010

== Sources ==
- Asoya, Sylvester (30 May 2021). "Chinua Achebe... A writer's writer". TheNEWS magazine. Archived from the original on 30 May 2021.
- Ezenwa-Ohaeto (1997). Chinua Achebe: A Biography. Bloomington: Indiana University Press. ISBN 978-0-253-33342-1. Archived from the original on 9 May 2021.
- Flood, Alison (14 November 2011). "Chinua Achebe refuses Nigerian national honour". The Guardian. Archived from the original on 28 June 2021.
- Flood, Alison (20 May 2013). "Calls for Chinua Achebe Nobel prize 'obscene', says Wole Soyinka". The Guardian. Archived from the original on 25 August 2021.
- Lynn, Thomas Jay (2017). Chinua Achebe and the Politics of Narration: Envisioning Language. London: Palgrave Macmillan. ISBN 978-3-319-51330-0.
- "Chinua Achebe Named Goodwill Ambassador for United Nations Population Fund". United Nations Population Fund. 7 January 1999. Archived from the original on 25 August 2021.
- "Nigerian Writer Wins German Peace Prize". Deutsche Welle. 13 October 2002. Archived from the original on 21 September 2016.
- "Achebe Wins Booker Prize for Fiction". The New York Times. Associated Press. 13 June 2007. Archived from the original on 2 June 2021.
- "Chinua Achebe nabs $300,000 Gish prize". CBC News. Associated Press. 25 September 2010. Archived from the original on 25 August 2021.
- "Current Members". American Academy of Arts and Letters. Archived from the original on 24 June 2016.
