= Dapo Olorunyomi =

Nigerian journalist

Dapo Olorunyomi, OON
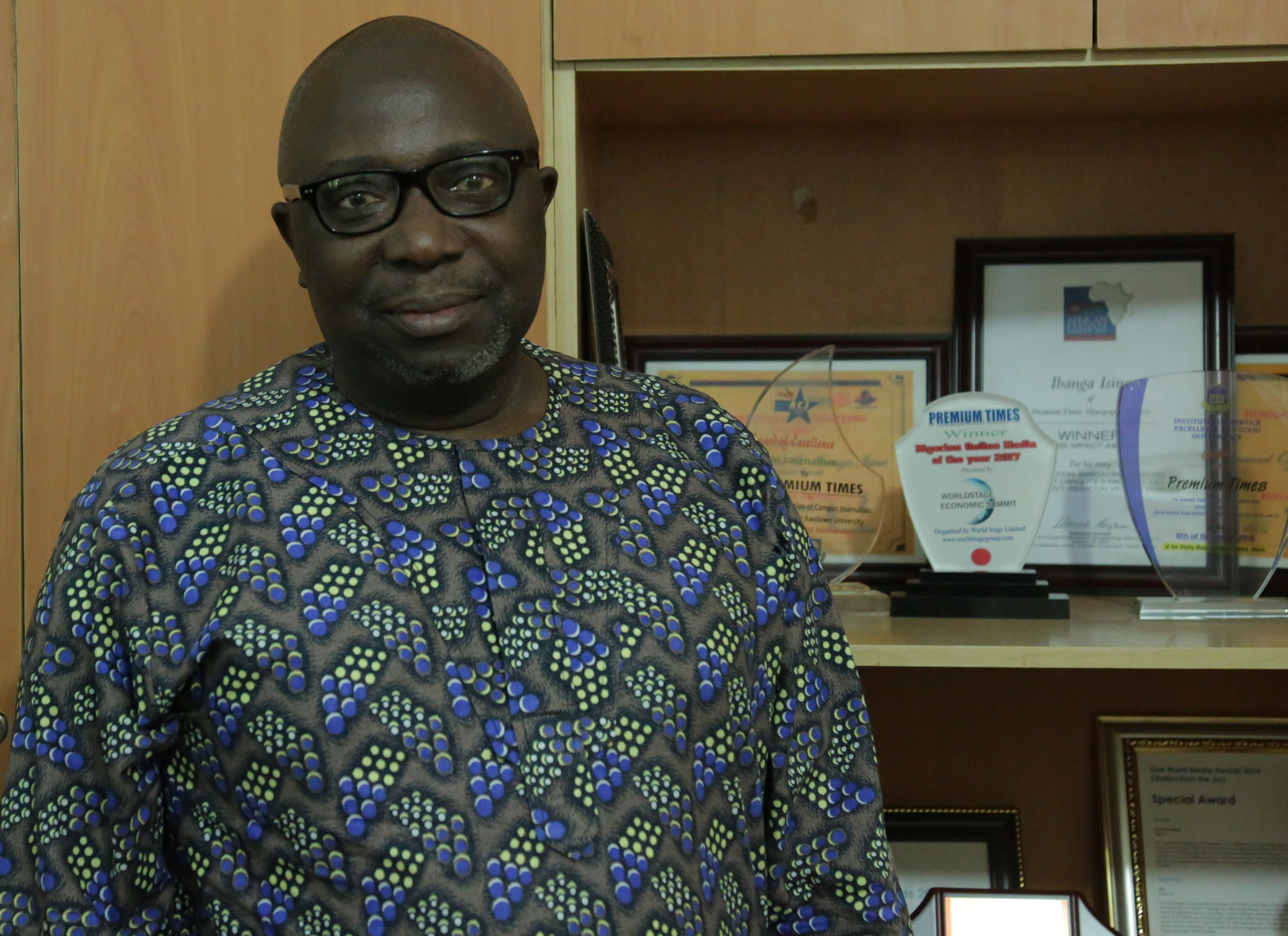

Publisher of Premium Times newspaper

Officer of the Order of the Niger (OON)
- In office June 2011 – To date

Chief Executive Officer of [Centre for Journalism Innovation & Development (CJID)]
- In office 2014 – To date

Personal details
- Born: Oladapo Oyekunle Olorunyomi; 8 November 1957 (age 68) Kano, Kano State, Nigeria
- Education: Obafemi Awolowo University, Ile-Ife, Osun State; University of Oxford and American University, Washington College of Law
- Profession: Journalist
- Nickname: Dapsy

Oyedapo Oyekunle "Dapo" Olorunyomi (born 8 November 1957) OON, is a Nigerian journalist. He is the publisher and editor-in-chief of Premium Times, an online Nigerian newspaper. He is also the chief executive officer of the Centre for Journalism Innovation and Development (CJID). He was the policy director and chief of staff to the executive chairman of the Economic and Financial Crimes Commission (EFCC).

== Early life and education ==
Olorunyomi was born in Kano, to Samuel Akinbayo Olorunyomi (who retired from the Army and then from the civil service as an Administrator) and Mary Olorunyomi. He attended St. Bartholomew's Primary School, Wusasa, Zaria, and Esie-Iludun Anglican Grammar School, Esie-Iludun and the Government Secondary School, Ilorin.

He earned a Bachelor of Art in English Studies in 1981, and an M.A. in Literature in 1985, from Obafemi Awolowo University, Ile-Ife. He holds a Certificate in Natural Resource Management from the Blavatnik School of Government, University of Oxford 2017 and a 2006 Certificate in Human Rights and Humanitarian Law from American University, Washington College of Law. He is the third of six siblings, including Sola Olorunyomi, who is the author of Afrobeat: Fela and the Imagined Continent, an acclaimed publication on Afrobeat pioneer, Fela Kuti.

== Career ==
He worked as an editor at Radio Nigeria and The African Guardian. He was the enterprise editor and head of the Investigative Reporting Team for Timbuktu Media Limited (publishers of 234Next), and founding editor of The News, PM News and Tempo Magazine. In 2004, when Olorunyomi returned to Nigeria after his exile, he worked as the Project Director of Freedom House. He later became the policy director and the chief of staff to the executive chairman of the Economic and Financial Crimes Commission, where he led the Commission's crimes prevention and education policy development initiatives on corruption.

He sits on the boards of many organisations, including the Norbert Zongo Cell for Investigative Journalism (an initiative of the UNODC), and the transnational investigative body for West Africa, headquartered in Burkina Faso, CENOZO. Between 1999 and 2001, Olorunyomi served on the International Jury for the International Consortium of Investigative Journalists [ICIJ] Award. In 2004, he was the West Africa Analyst for the Global Survey of Media Independence. He is the chief judge for the Zimeo Award of the African Media Initiative (AMI).

He founded the Wole Soyinka Investigative Reporting Award (WSIRA) in 2005. In 2008, this was renamed the Wole Soyinka Centre for Investigative Journalism (WSCIJ), a nonprofit organisation engaged in social justice and investigative journalism with the goal of exposing corruption, regulatory failures and human rights abuses. The nonprofit hands out annual awards to journalists engaged in investigative journalism.

In 2011, he founded Premium Times, a Nigeria-based multimedia news platform devoted to politics, health, investigative reporting and development journalism. Alongside Musikilu Mojeed in 2014, he co-founded the Premium Times Centre for Investigative Journalism (PTCIJ), a journalism innovation organisation to promote democratic accountability for inclusive and sustainable development. The platform formally changed its name to the Centre for Journalism Innovation & Development (CJID) to reflect its vision as a leader in investigative journalism, innovation, open data, verification, promotion of the welfare and safety of journalists, elections, the freedom of information and expression in several African countries, including Nigeria, Ghana, Sierra Leone, Liberia, and The Gambia.

On June 12, 2025, he was conferred with the national honour of Officer of the Order of the Niger (OON) by President Bola Tinubu for his contributions towards the fight for the country's democracy.

== Activism ==
In June 1995 under General Sani Abacha’s military government, four journalists - Kunle Ajibade of The News, Chris Anyanwu of The Sunday Magazine, George M'Bah of Tell Magazine and Ben Charles-Obi of Classique Magazine - were jailed for reporting an alleged plot to topple the Abacha government. These journalists were secretly tried, charged as "accessories after the fact of treason" by a Special Military Tribunal, convicted and jailed for life. Olorunyomi declared wanted by the Abacha administration on account of his work with The News magazine, was forced into exile in the United States. Ladi Olorunyomi, a journalist, women's right activist and wife to Dapo was detained for 68 days without charges. While in exile in the U.S., Olorunyomi spoke on Abacha's media crackdown at the April Committee to Protect Journalists roundtable and Ladi Olorunyomi was released. The four jailed journalists were released by General Abdulsalami Abubakar and Dapo Olorunyomi later returned to Nigeria.

In 2021, Olorunyomi was arrested for publishing a libelous and defamatory publications against the Chief of Army staff, Tukur Yusuf Buratai as reported by Vanguard.

== Awards and recognitions ==
• Officer of the Order of the Niger (OON) (2025)

- International Editor of the Year Award by the World Press Review (1995)
- PEN Center (West) Freedom to Write Award (1996)
- Press Freedom Award of the National Association of Black Journalists (NABJ) New York, U.S.A (1996)
- Hellman Hemmett grant of the Human Rights Watch (1996)
- Diamond Award for Media Excellence's Lifetime Achievement Award by Diamond Publications (2017)
- CPJ International Press Freedom Awards (2021)
