= Enanga Kebbi =

Cameroonian journalist (1960–2022)

Juliana Enanga Kebbi
- Born: 1960
- Died: 13 September 2022 (aged 62); Tunisia
- Occupations: Journalist; communicator; politician

Juliana Enanga Kebbi (1960 – 13 September 2022) was a Cameroonian journalist, communicator, and politician. She was widely known as Enanga Kebbi.

== Biography ==
=== Career in journalism and communications ===
Kebbi, a graduate of the University of Yaoundé, was a pioneer of CRTV (Cameroon Radio and Television) when it was known as CTV. She began her career as a Speakerine before transitioning into journalism. Over the years, she rose to prominence within the company, holding various positions including Head of the Reserved Affairs Reporting Unit.

Kebbi was often regarded as the English voice of the First Lady, spending nearly two decades covering and promoting her initiatives. Through reports, interviews, and documentaries, she informed the public about events such as New Year's wishes ceremonies for Chantal Biya and activities of associated organizations including African Synergies, the Circle of Friends of Cameroon, CHRACERH (Hospital Center for Research and Application in Endoscopic Surgery and Human Reproduction) in Yaoundé, the Chantal Biya International Reference Center for research on HIV/AIDS prevention and management, and the Chantal Biya Foundation.

=== Political career ===
Kebbi was actively involved in politics for almost 30 years, primarily within the RDPC (Rassemblement Démocratique du Peuple Camerounais). She became known as a key figure in the South-West region, her area of origin. Due to her dedication and dynamism, she rose within the party's leadership alongside figures such as Christophe Mien Zok, Charles Ateba Eyene, and Simon Meyanga. In 2008, she was appointed a mission leader within the secretariat of the Central Committee by Paul Biya, the National President of the party. Additionally, she joined the National Office of the OFRDPC.

=== Death ===
Kebbi died on 13 September 2022, in Tunisia, leaving behind her two boys, sisters, brother and several others she cared for.
