= Adefemi =

Adefemi is both a given name and surname. Notable people with the name include:

== Given name ==
- Adefemi Kila (born 1945), Nigerian politician

== Surname ==
- Lukman Adefemi (born 1994), Nigerian footballer
- Olubayo Adefemi (1985–2011), Nigerian footballer
