= Oluseye =

Nigerian given name

- Gender: Male
- Language: Yoruba

Origin
- Origin: Nigeria
- Meaning: Lord of Honor, God celebrates
- Region of origin: South-west Nigeria

Other names
- Short form: Seye Olu

Oluseye audio is a Yoruba name of Nigerian origin. It combines "Olu" meaning "Lord" or "Master" and "Seye" derived from "seyi" meaning "honour," "dignity," or "celebration." Thus, Oluseye translates to "Lord of Honour/master of Dignity" or "God Celebrates". It is a name that originated from Southwest, Nigeria. It's diminutive version includes "Olu", "Seye" e.t.c. It is a male given name.

== Notable people with the name ==
- Ajayi Oluseye, Nigerian association football player
- Spinall (Sodamola Oluseye Desmond), Nigerian disc jockey and record producer
- Oluseye Olympio, Nigerian cricketer
- Oluseye Olugbemiga Kehinde, Nigerian journalist
