= Fisayo =

Fisayo is a Nigerian given name. Notable people with the name include:

- Fisayo Adarabioyo (born 1995), English footballer
- Fisayo Ajisola, Nigerian television and film actress, model, and singer
- Fisayo Dele-Bashiru (born 2001), English footballer
- Fisayo Soyombo, Nigerian journalist
