= Simon Ateba =

Cameroonian journalist

- Born: 1979 (age 46–47); Cameroon
- Citizenship: Cameroon
- Occupation: Journalist

Simon Ateba (born 1979 or 1980) is a Cameroonian journalist. He is the owner and sole employee of the website Today News Africa, for which he was a White House correspondent. Following Ateba's repeated interruptions of press briefings, where he shouted at press secretary Karine Jean-Pierre and complained about not being called on, the press office tightened rules governing the issuance of hard passes for journalists. After Ateba was excluded from the White House Correspondents' Association (WHCA) dinner, he tweeted out the private phone number of WHCA president Tamara Keith.

Before coming to the United States in 2017, Ateba was a journalist in Nigeria, working for P.M. News and The NEWS magazine. He investigated the link between religion and money in Nigeria and was detained briefly in Cameroon where he was accused of spying for Boko Haram.

== Early life ==
Ateba was born in Cameroon in 1979 or 1980. His father worked as a fish trader.

== Career ==
=== Nigeria ===
Ateba moved to Nigeria, where he worked at P.M. News and for nine years at The NEWS magazine. In 2011, he appeared in the documentary Nigeria's Millionaire Preachers about religion becoming a big business in Nigeria. By then, he had investigated the link between religion and money in Nigeria for about five years and had been assaulted at least once during those investigations. He was attacked by a mob in 2009 while working on an assignment at a church in Lagos.

On August 28, 2015, Ateba was arrested by Cameroonian authorities and accused of spying for Boko Haram as he investigated the living conditions of Nigerian refugees camped in the country's north. Ateba was based in Lagos and had travelled to Cameroon after receiving a grant from the International Centre for Investigative Reporting in Abuja to investigate the ordeals and suffering of Nigerians who had fled to Cameroon following Boko Haram attacks on their communities. He was released after being detained for four days. Ateba's arrest and detention were condemned by the Cameroon Journalism Trade Union.

In January 2023, Ateba said that he had been "attacked by pirates on the Gulf of Guinea with an AK47 to my head, kidnapped in Nigeria, dumped in the woods & left for dead, arrested in Cameroon during investigation & kept in dark cell only to be sidelined at the White House..." The Washington Post was able to verify that he had been arrested and held for four days in Cameroon, but were unable to verify his other claims.

=== United States ===
Ateba moved to Washington, D.C. in 2017 to report on Africa–United States relations, which he told The New York Times was motivated by an interest in the subject and the desire to leave West Africa due to dangers he experienced working as a journalist.

In September 2023, Ateba shared a fake video allegedly of Ukrainian president Volodymyr Zelenskyy performing a belly dance. The video had been digitally altered to superimpose Zelenskyy's face onto the body of Argentine belly dancer Pablo Acosta.

In February 2024, Ateba claimed that Russia had prevented a Ukrainian assassination attempt on Tucker Carlson. Voice of America traced the source of the claim to a YouTube video that was cited by The Intel Drop, a website that BBC journalist Shayan Sardarizadeh characterized as "a notorious pro-Kremlin disinformation website with a long history of fabricating stories aimed to disparage Ukraine."

In April 2024, Ateba was included as one of the defendants in a defamation lawsuit by a man who was falsely identified as the perpetrator of the 2023 Allen, Texas mall shooting, alongside others such as Fox News, Newsmax and InfoWars personality Owen Shroyer. The man alleged the defendants had "recklessly disregarded basic journalistic safeguards and published the photo of an innocent man, branding him as a neo-Nazi murderer to his local community and the nation at large." In the same month, Ateba posted a video of President Joe Biden that had been altered to include audio of people shouting expletives; Ateba subsequently deleted the tweet.

==== White House correspondent ====
During Ateba's time as a White House correspondent, he became known for interrupting press briefings, being out of process, and complaining about not being called on to ask questions. He accused White House officials of discrimination. In December 2021, Ateba questioned Jen Psaki about the Omicron-linked travel ban President Biden imposed on eight African nations. In December 2022, Ateba had a tense exchange with Karine Jean-Pierre at the White House, in which he accused her of discrimination.

On March 20, 2023, Ateba shouted at Karine Jean-Pierre during a press conference that included the cast of the comedy series Ted Lasso. Ateba said that Jean-Pierre had discriminated against him by not calling on him during her seven-month tenure as White House Press Secretary. In response to Ateba's behaviour, the White House press office sought to tighten rules governing the issuance of hard passes, which allow reporters like Ateba to enter White House grounds without prior permission.

In April 2023, Ateba falsely claimed he was banned from the White House Correspondents' Association (WHCA) dinner. Only news organizations that employ WHCA members are allowed to buy tickets to the dinner. Ateba was unable to provide evidence he was employed by a legitimate news organization; he is the owner and sole staffer of the website Today News Africa, for which he is the White House correspondent. Since Ateba's application to join the association was rejected, he cannot buy tickets to the event; however, another outlet could invite him as a guest. Ateba tweeted out the phone number of WHCA president Tamara Keith, who had complained about his behavior; he later deleted the tweets.

In June 2023, following another heated exchange between Ateba and Karine Jean-Pierre, the White House's published official video coverage of the presser omitted the portion of the event that included the exchange. White House officials blamed a technical "glitch" for the edit, and it was later restored. In July 2023, the White House warned Ateba that he would risk losing access to briefings if he continued to disrupt and prevent other reporters from asking questions when called. After the new policy on White House hard passes took effect on July 31, 2023, Ateba filed a lawsuit against Karine Jean-Pierre, contending that his inability to obtain press credentials amounted to discrimination. His case was dismissed in district court.
