= Federal Government College, Odogbolu =

- Odogbolu, Ogun State; Nigeria

Information
- Type: boarding day
- Motto: Pro Unitate (For Unity)
- Established: January 1973 (53 years ago)
- Founder: Federal Government of Nigeria
- Status: Open
- Principal: Akinpelu Amos
- Gender: Mixed
- Campus type: Urban
- Colour: Green
- Website: fgcodogbolu.sch.ng

Federal Government College, Odogbolu is a state-owned secondary school located in Odogbolu town in Ogun State. The school was founded in January 1973 as one of the unity schools by the federal government. It has facilities for both day and boarding students. It is unique for its sporting houses to which all students belong. The houses are named for important water bodies in Nigeria such as Lake Chad, Cross River, Niger River, and the Osun River.

== Former students ==
- Fisayo Ajisola, television and film actress, model and singer
- Rotimi Babatunde, writer and playwright
- Olurotimi Badero, physician
- Emamode Edosio, film maker and film director
- Ufuoma McDermott, film-maker, actor and former model
- Blessing Nwagba, politician
- Bayo Onanuga, Director-General, News Agency of Nigeria
- Adewale Tinubu, businessperson
- Patrick Chuka, Artist and Entrepreneur
- Abubakar Liman, military officer and commandant AFCSC, jaji.
