= Aruwa Gyunka =

Nigerian politician

Senator 8th National Assembly
- Succeeded by: Godiya Akwashiki
- Constituency: Nasarawa North Senatorial District

Personal details
- Occupation: Politician

Philip Aruwa Gyunka is a Nigerian politician. He was a Senator who represented the Nasarawa North Senatorial District in the 8th National Assembly. He was succeeded by Godiya Akwashiki.

== See also ==
- Nigerian senators of the 8th National Assembly
