= Abubakar Liman =

Air Vice Marshal Abubakar Sadick Liman
- Born: 1 January 1964 (age 62); Lapai, Nigeria
- Allegiance: Nigeria
- Branch: Nigerian Air Force
- Service years: 1989
- Rank: Air Vice Marshal
- Commands: Armed Forces Resettlement Center Lagos (2017-2019); Armed Forces Command and Staff College, Jaji (2019-present- 2021)
- Education: Federal Government College Ikorodu

Abubakar Sadiq Liman (born 1 January 1964) is a military officer in the Nigerian Air force. In November 2019, he was appointed commandant of Armed Forces Command and Staff College, Jaji to March 2021. He is presently appointed as the Deputy chief of Defence Intelligence Agency (Nigeria) (DIA).

== Biography ==
He was born in Lapai, Niger State. He started his early education in Central Primary School Lapai and he obtained his high certificate at Federal Government College Odogbolu, Ogun. He was member of the 37 Regular Course in helicopter engineer at Nigerian Defence Academy. He holds B.Sc. in Physics and Diploma in Public Administration.

He had an Engineering Training course 320 Air Force Institute of Technology, Hughes 300C helicopter at 115 Special operations group Port Harcourt and Mil Mi-34c helicopter in Russia, and later as a junior rank he obtained a Senior Staff Courses at Armed Forces Command and Staff College Jaji.

Courses he obtained includes:

- Exclusive Economic Zone Management Course in Ghana Armed Forces Command and Staff College.
- Defence Management Course at Ghana Armed Forces Command and Staff College.
- Policy and Strategy Management Course at National Institute for Policy and Strategic Studies Kuru.

Before his appointment, he was deputy defence adviser of the high commission of Nigeria in South Africa and commandant Base service group 455 in Kano State and last post held was commandant of Armed Forces Resettlement Centre, Lagos state.
