= King's College, Lagos =

King's College
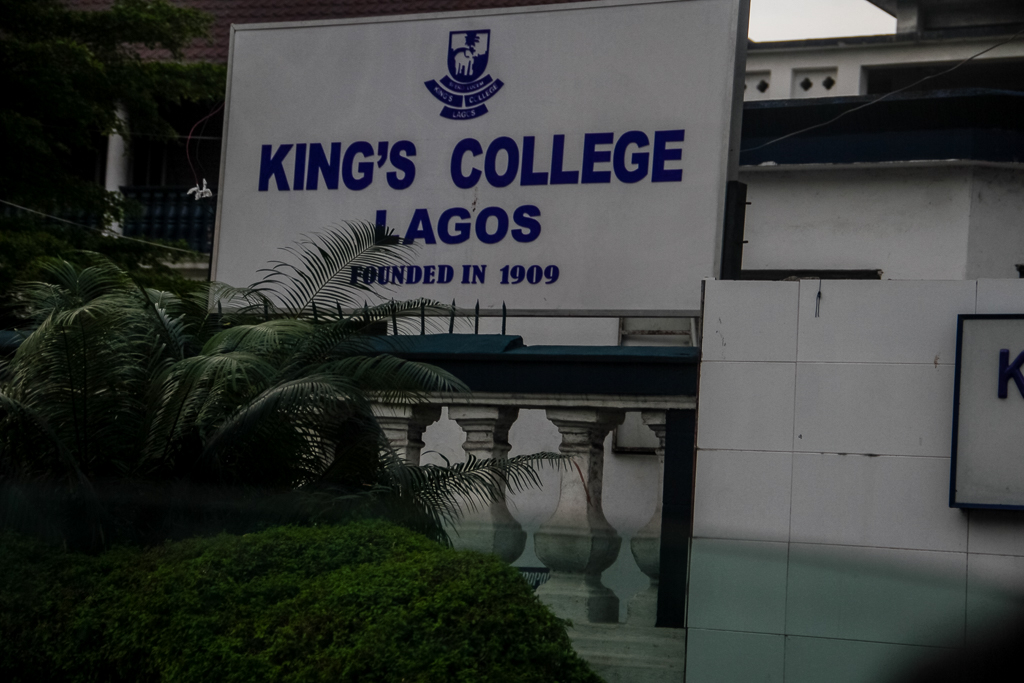
- King's College, Lagos

Location
- 3, Catholic Mission Street; Lagos, Lagos State; Nigeria; 6°26′59″N 3°23′57″E

Information
- Type: State secondary school
- Motto: spero lucem
- Established: 20 September 1909; 116 years ago
- Sister school: Queen's College
- Principal: Mogaji Zakaria
- Grades: JSS1–SSS3
- Gender: Boys
- Website: kingscollegelagos.sch.ng

King's College, Lagos (KCL) is a secondary school in Lagos, Lagos State, Nigeria. It was founded on 20 September 1909 with 10 students at Lagos Island, adjacent to Tafawa Balewa Square. The school admits only boys as pupils, although prior to the establishment of Queen's College Lagos it also admitted some female students.

== History ==
In 1908, the Nigerian Acting Director of Education in Lagos, Henry Rawlingson Carr, proposed to Governor Walter Egerton a detailed scheme of education for Lagos. Carr's suggestions and proposals were the basis for the formation of King's College. The local Yoruba King, Oba Esugbayi (Eleko of Eko/Oba of Lagos) agreed to provide land for the project with a goal to strengthen access to education for the Yorubas in Lagos. Carr convinced the London Board of Education that King's College's education mission would not overlap but supplement the education initiatives of missionary societies. As a result, some authors regard Henry Carr as the "architect of King's College".

King's School (as it was then called) came into being on 20 September 1909. The pioneer students included J.C. Vaughan, Isaac Ladipo Oluwole, Frank Macaulay, Daniel Adeniyi Onojobi, Herbert Mills (from the Gold Coast), O.A. Omololu, and Moses King. Oluwole was the first senior prefect. Constructing and furnishing the school building had a cost of £10,001 (About £1,048,661.20 in 2026)

The philosophy of King's School was

"to provide for the youth of the colony a higher general education than that supplied by the existing Schools, to prepare them for Matriculation Examination of the University of London and to give a useful course of Study to those who intend to qualify for Professional life or to enter Government or Mercantile service."

The average number of students in 1910 was 16, rising to 67 by 1914.

King's College is now one of 104 unity schools in Nigeria managed by the federal government to bring together children from different geographic, ethnic, and socio-economic backgrounds to build Nigeria's future, especially in the aftermath of the Nigerian Civil War.

== Campuses ==
The school was divided into two campuses, with the junior school moving into the premises of the former Federal School for Arts and Sciences (F.S.A.S) on Victoria Island. The school administration was still under the control of one principal and ultimately under the control of the Federal Ministry of Education.

The seniors are split as follows: SS1 to SS3 boys are found in the Main Campus (Tafawa Balewa Square), while JSS1 to JSS3 boys are found in the annex campus (Victoria Island).

== Principals ==
The first principal of the school was a Mr Lomax, while the first African principal was Rex Akpofure. The current principal of the school is Ali Andrew Agada. Some other principals were:

- Lomax (1909–1910)
- Henry Hyde-Johnson (1910)
- Frank Sutherland Scruby (1911–1914)
- Charles McKee Wright (1914-1917)
- J.A. de Gaye (1917–1919)
- D.L. Kerr (1919)
- H.A.A.F. Harman (1919–1925)
- W.M. Peacock (1926–1931)
- J.N. Panes (1931–1936)
- A.H. Clift (1936–1947)
- H.H. Jeffers (Acting Principal, 1941–1942)
- A.D. Porter (1947)
- G.P. Savage (1948)
- J.R. Bunting (1949–1954)
- P. H. Davis (1957 to 1964)
- Rex Akpofure (1964–1968)(first indigenous principal)
- R. S. G. Agiobu-Kemmer (1968–1975)
- M.O. Imana (1975–1978)
- Augustine A. Ibegbulam (1978–1985)
- S. O. Agun (1985–1992)
- S. A. Akinruli (1992–1994)
- S. I. Balogun
- Sylvester M. Onoja
- Yetunde Awofuwa (first female principal)
- Akintoye A. Ojemuyiwa
- Otunba Oladele Olapeju
- Anthony Thomas
- Ibezim Elizabeth
- Agada Ali Andrew
- Magaji Zachariah (2025 till date)

== Notable alumni ==
- Adedamola Richard Kasunmu, Politician, Legislator, Deputy Majority Leader, Lagos State House of Assembly
- Simeon Adebo, Administrator, lawyer, and diplomat
- Lateef Adegbite, Secretary-General of the Nigerian Supreme Council for Islamic Affairs
- Wale Adenuga, film producer
- Adetokunbo Ademola, former Chief Justice of the Federal Republic of Nigeria
- Claude Ake, Professor of Political Economy, International scholar and Social Crusader
- Sam Akpabot, music composer
- Ephraim Akpata, Justice of the Supreme Court of Nigeria
- Rotimi Alakija, Nigerian disc jockey, record producer and recording artist.
- Sola Akinyede, federal Senator 2007–2011
- Cobhams Asuquo, African music producer
- Hakeem Bello-Osagie, CEO Etisalat Nigeria
- Russel Dikko, physician and former Federal Commissioner for Mines and Power
- Alex Ekwueme, former Vice President of Nigeria
- Arnold Ekpe, banker
- Chief Anthony Enahoro, journalist and democracy advocate
- Ibrahim Gambari, United Nations representative
- Akanu Ibiam, Governor of the Eastern Region and Medical doctor
- Asue Ighodalo, lawyer and partner at Banwo and Ighodalo
- Oladipo Jadesimi, businessman
- Lateef Jakande, former Governor of Lagos State and former Federal Minister of Works & Housing
- Adetokunbo Lucas, physician and international expert on tropical diseases
- Vincent I. Maduka, president of the Nigerian Society of Engineers (1992–1993)
- Audu Maikori, lawyer, entrepreneur, activist, and youth leader, CEO Chocolate City Music
- Samuel Manuwa, surgeon and administrator
- Babagana Monguno, Nigerian National Security Adviser
- Gogo Chu Nzeribe, Nigerian trade unionist and a leader of the nation's communist movement
- Audu Ogbeh, former PDP Chairman and Minister of Agriculture
- Adebayo Ogunlesi, current chairman and managing partner of Global Infrastructure Partners
- Emeka Ojukwu, Governor of the Eastern Region of Nigeria & Head of State of the defunct Republic of Biafra
- Lateef Olufemi Okunnu, lawyer and University Administrator
- Kole Omotosho, author and academic
- Victor Ovie Whisky, chairman of the Federal Electoral Commission (FEDECO)
- Adeyinka Oyekan, Oba of Lagos from 1965 to 2003
- Atedo Peterside, banker, entrepreneur and the founder of Stanbic IBTC Bank Plc
- Christopher Oluwole Rotimi, retired Nigerian Army Brigadier General, diplomat and politician.
- Sanusi Lamido Sanusi, Emir of Kano, and former managing director of First Bank Nigeria and former Governor of the Central Bank of Nigeria
- Bukola Saraki, former President of the Senate of Nigeria, and former Governor of Kwara State
- Fela Sowande, musicologist and composer
- Udoma Udo Udoma, federal Senator (1999–2007) and Chairman of UAC of Nig. Plc
- Shamsudeen Usman, former Finance Minister of Nigeria
- Olumide Akpata, president Nigerian Bar Association
- James Churchill Vaughan, co-founder and first president of the Lagos Youth Movement in 1934

== Photo gallery ==
King's College, Lagos

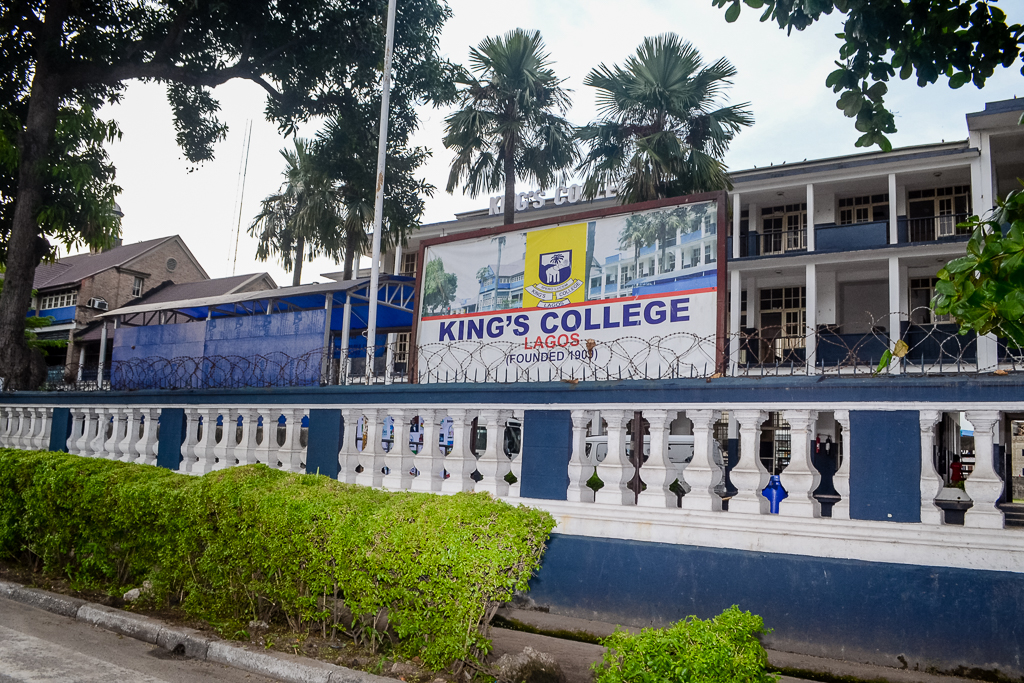
Kings College, Lagos

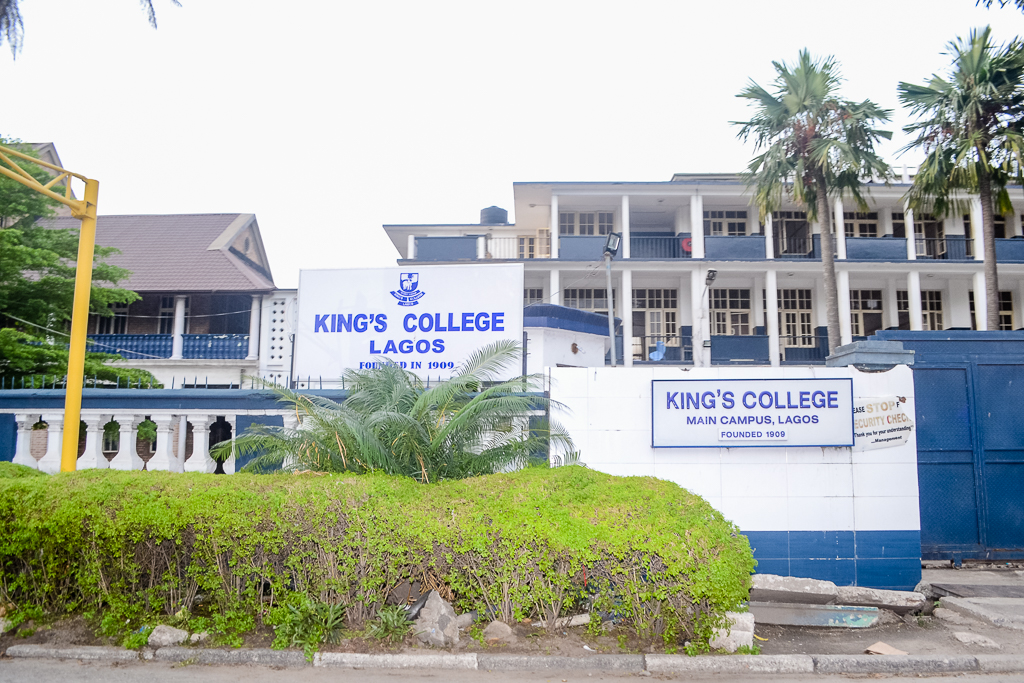
Kings College, Lagos

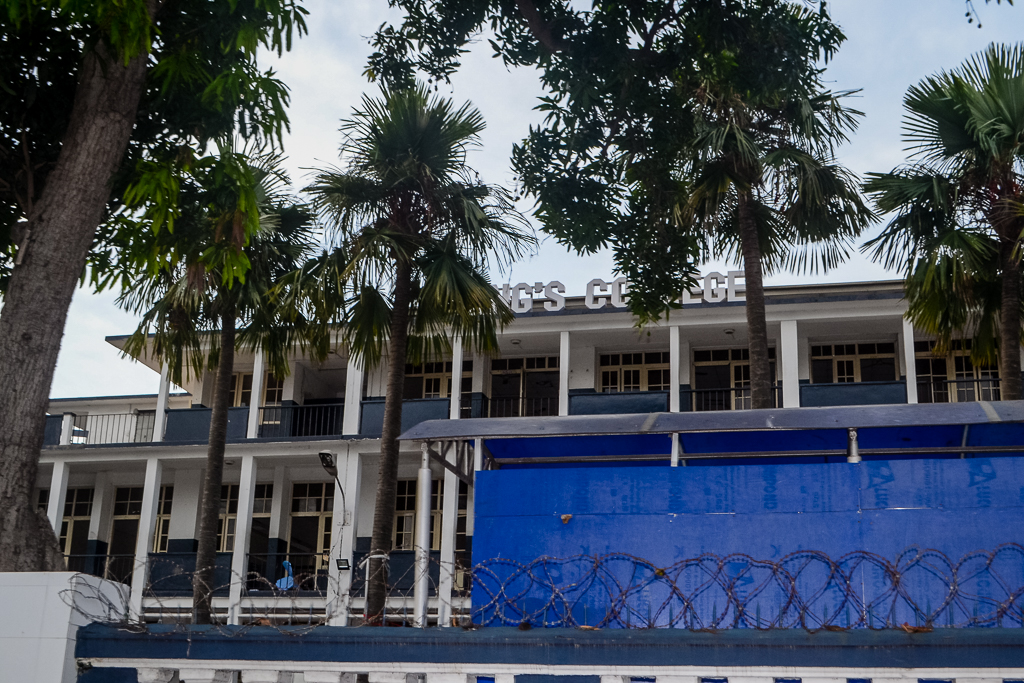
Kings College, Lagos
