= Festus Olabode Ola =

Nigerian politician (born 1956)

Senator for Ekiti Central
- In office 30 June 2009 – May 2011
- Preceded by: Clement Awoyelu
- Succeeded by: Babafemi Ojudu

Personal details
- Born: 12 November 1956 (age 68); Ekiti State, Nigeria

Festus Olabode Ola (born 12 November 1956) was elected Senator for Ekiti Central constituency of Ekiti State, Nigeria, taking office on 30 June 2009. He is a member of the Action Congress (AC) party.

Ola obtained a Higher National Diploma in Accountancy in 1982. He was employed in the Foreign Service (1983–2004). In the 2007 elections Adefemi Kila of the People's Democratic Party (PDP) was declared the winner for Ekiti Central. However, on 30 June 2009, the Court of Appeal quashed Kila's election and declared Bode Ola the lawful winner of the April 2007 poll. A deciding factor was that 19,000 of the ballots cast for Chief Kila had the same serial number.
