= Kunle Ajibade =

Nigerian journalist, editor and author

- Born: 28 May 1958
- Education: Obafemi Awolowo University
- Occupations: Journalist, editor, writer

Kunle Ajibade (born 28 May 1958) is a Nigerian journalist, editor and author. In 1995, along with General Olusegun Obasanjo, and three other journalists, was jailed for life on charges of treason. In 1998/1999, he was a Feuchtwanger fellow at the Villa Aurora in Los Angeles.

== Education and early career ==
Ajibade holds a Bachelor's in English Studies and a Masters in Literature-In-English from the Obafemi Awolowo University. He has worked as Senior Correspondent at The African Concord, Assistant Editor at The African Guardian, and as Executive Editor of TheNEWS and P.M. News.

== Arrest, imprisonment, and release ==
In 1995, the military administration of Sani Abacha announced the arrest of a number of Nigerians on suspicion of participating in a coup attempt. The list included former head of state Olusegun Obasanjo, his deputy Shehu Musa Yar'Adua, among others.

During the trial of the coup plotters, TheNews, one of Nigeria's prominent investigative and combative news magazines published a story titled "Not Guilty - Army Panel Clears Coup Suspects." And though he was no longer the editor of the paper as he was earlier in the year, because his name appeared on the mast head, Ajibade was targeted for arrest.

He was charged for 'publishing materials which could obstruct the work of the coup plotters tribunal' and for 'misleading the public'. The crime was being "'as an accessary after the fact of treason" and the punishment was life in prison. It was the first time journalists would be tried (and convicted) with coup plotters in the country.

Other journalists arrested at the same time were George Mbah of Tell Magazine, Chris Anyanwu of The Sunday Magazine, and Ben Obi of the Weekend Classique.

They were all convicted and sentenced to life in jail, while Yar'adua was sentenced to death. Ajibade was taken to Makurdi prison, according to him, "to die incrementally".

There was international outcry and the sentence for Ajibade was reduced to 15 years.

On 8 June 1998, General Abacha died in office. Ajibade was released on 18 July of that year by General Abdulsalami Abubakar.

== Personal life ==
Ajibade is married, with 2 sons.

== Books ==
- Kunle Ajibade (2003). Jailed for Life: A Reporter's Prison Notes. HEBN Publishers. p. 228. ISBN 9789781295591.
- Kunle Ajibade (2008). What a Country!. Bookcraft. p. 176. ISBN 9789788135296.
