= Samuel Manuwa =

Nigerian doctor (1903–1976)

Oloye Sir Samuel Ayodeji Manuwa
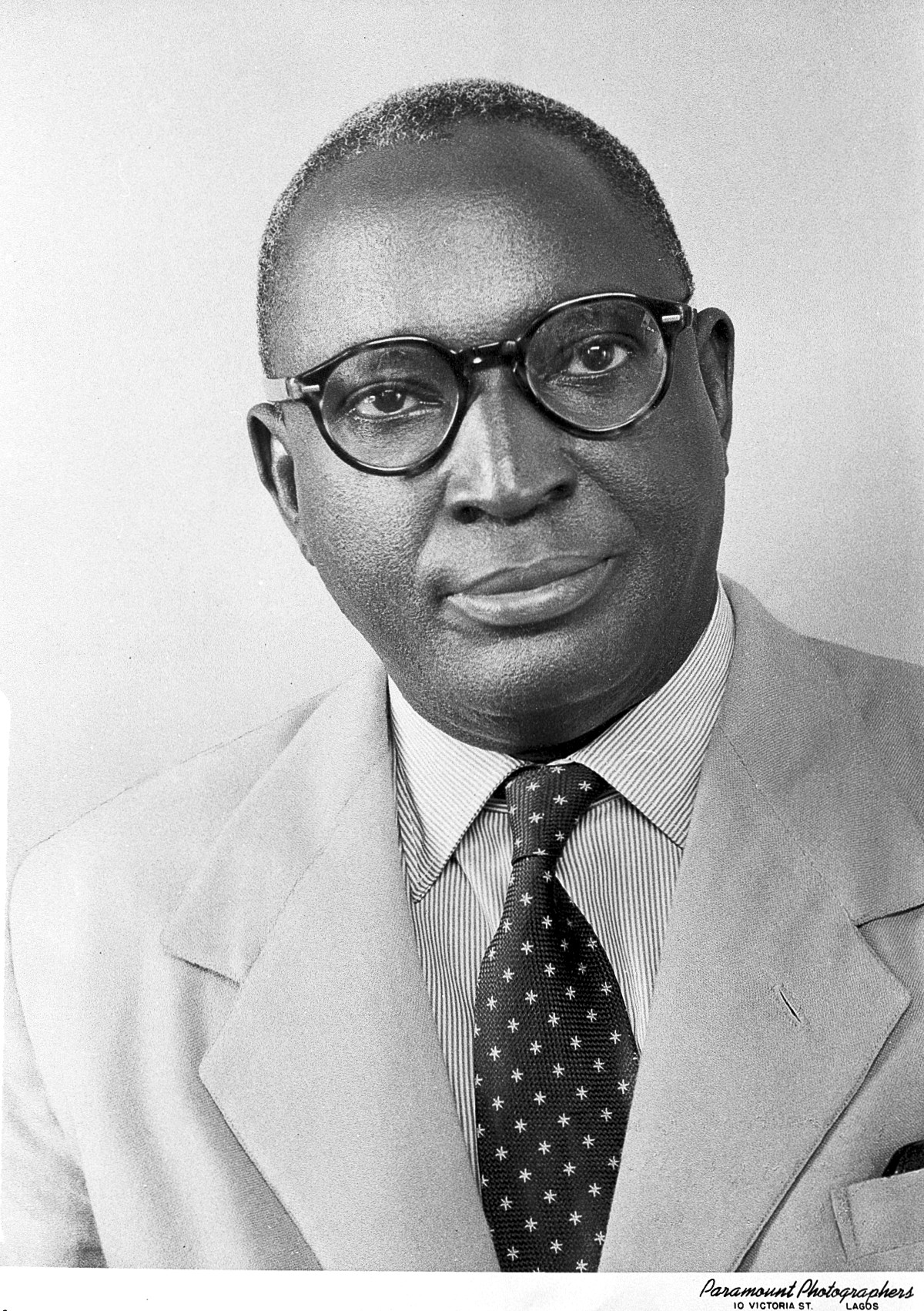
- Born: 1903; Ogun State, Nigeria
- Died: 1976 (aged 72–73); Lagos, Nigeria
- Education: University of Edinburgh
- Known for: Tropical Medicine
- Awards: Robert Wilson Memorial Prize in Chemistry, Welcome Prize in Medicine
- Scientific career
- Workplaces: Colonial Medical Service, Lagos

Oloye Sir Samuel Layinka Ayodeji Manuwa, CMG, OBE (1903–1976) was a Nigerian surgeon, Inspector General of Medical Services and former Chief Medical Adviser to the Federal Government of Nigeria. He was the first Nigerian to pass the FRCS and he was awarded the degree of Doctor of Medicine (MD) by the University of Edinburgh in 1934. In 1966, he was elected president of the World Federation for Mental Health.

During his lifetime he served as a Nigerian aristocrat, holding the chieftaincy titles of the Obadugba of Ondoland, the Olowa Luwagboye of Ijebuland and the Iyasere of Itebu - Manuwa, all of the south-western region of the country.

As Inspector General of Medical Services, he contributed immensely to the establishment of the University College Hospital (UCH), Ibadan, the first medical school in Nigeria. He later became a pro-chancellor and chairman of the governing council at the University of Ibadan. Throughout his career, he sought and worked for the improvement of basic health services in the rural areas of Nigeria.

== Birth and education ==
Oloye Sir Samuel Manuwa was born to the family of the Reverend Benjamin Manuwa, a Christian minister who was himself the son of Oba Kuheyin, the king of Itebu - Manuwa. His mother was Mrs. Matilda Aderinsola Manuwa, who hailed from the Thomas family of Ondo Town.

He attended the Church Missionary School, Lagos, and King's College, Lagos, for secondary education, completing his studies in 1921. He then proceeded to study at the University of Edinburgh, where he received a bachelor's degree in Chemistry and Medicine in 1926. He graduated with several awards, winning every prize available in the medical school, including the Robert Wilson Memorial Prize in Chemistry and, in 1924, the Wellcome Prize in the History of Medicine for his essay on “The history of the development of our knowledge regarding internal secretion”. He later went to study in Liverpool, and completed a course on Tropical Medicine. He became a medical doctor in 1926.

== Career ==
He returned to Nigeria in 1927 after finishing his studies on tropical medicine and joined the colonial medical services as a medical officer. He subsequently became a surgeon specialist and senior specialist in the service, where he gained acclaim as a skilled surgeon. Though he received various offers for administrative positions early on, he continued his surgical work for more than 18 years. While practising as a surgeon, he invented an excision knife to treat tropical ulcers.

In 1948, he lifted his embargo on administrative positions when he became the deputy director of medical services. In 1951, he was made the first Nigerian director of medical services and subsequently the Inspector General of medical services. In 1954, he became fully involved with the Nigerian public service when he was appointed the Chief Medical Adviser to the federal government of Nigeria. He later went on to become a member of the Privy Council of the Federation of Nigeria, President of the Association of Surgeons and Physicians in West Africa and the first Nigerian Commissioner of the Federal Public Service Commission.

As Inspector General of Medical Services, he worked assiduously for the establishment of a University Teaching Hospital in the country. The result was the creation of UCH, Ibadan.

== Notable family ==
Sir Samuel was twice married and had six children, all of whom are now distinguished in various professions including medicine, law, nursing, education and the public service both of Nigeria and the UK.

He had several grandchildren who work in professions as varied as medicine, information technology, education, law, publishing, the dramatic arts, sports, economics, banking and finance. One of them, Jimi Manuwa, is a retired UFC fighter who was based in the UK.
