= Vincent I. Maduka =

Nigerian engineer and broadcaster

Vincent I. Maduka, OFR (born October 5, 1935) is a Nigerian engineer, broadcaster and the first director general of the Nigerian Television Authority (NTA). He holds the Nigerian national honour of the Officer of the Order of the Federal Republic of Nigeria, OFR (2003). He was between 2008 and 2016 a senior fellow at the Pan-Atlantic University, Lagos, Nigeria.

== Early life and background ==
Maduka was born on October 5, 1935, in Epetedo area of Lagos state, Nigeria, to Albert Uzediuno Maduka and Cecilia Amuamuziam Maduka, who hailed from Illah in Oshimili North Local Government Area of Delta State. At the traditional christening, he was named Ifeanyichukwu, however, his father’s friend and neighbour gave the name Bamidele and that (Dele) quickly became the neighbourhood preference. He was baptised at the Holy Cross Cathedral three months after he was born, with the name Vincent.

He had his primary education at Lagos Government (Primary) School, Sandgrouse and was later admitted on scholarship into King’s College in 1949. He was granted a Western Regional Government Scholarship and admission into Leeds University in England in 1956, where he graduated B.Sc Hons (Electrical Engineering) in 1959. Maduka started work at Marconi, at Chelmsford. From there, he was recruited by Western Nigerian Television (WNTV) Ibadan, owned by the Western Nigerian Government Broadcasting Corporation (WNBC) in 1961. Maduka left WNTV for University College Dublin in 1967 for an MEng.Sc degree. He married Olu in North Wales on 17 December 1968.

== Career ==
After few months at the Irish public radio and television organisation Telefís Éireann, Maduka returned to WNTV in 1968 under Teju Oyeleye who retired in 1973 and whom he succeeded as chief executive officer of WNTV-WNBS. Under his tenure as chief executive officer WNTV-WNBS Ibadan became a show-piece in programming and commercial viability. Four years later, in 1977, the military administration of General Olusugun Obasanjo appointed Vincent Maduka pioneer Director-General of the new federal television monopoly, the NTA.

The civilian administration of President Shehu Shagari in 1979 did not accept the non-partisan posture NTA was adopting under Maduka and in 1983 he, was summarily removed from NTA and assigned him to the Ministry of Communication as a technical adviser.

Maduka was reinstated to his post as DG NTA by the General Muhammadu Buhari-led military government which overthrew President Shagari’s government. He retired voluntarily at the age of 50 to set up a management and engineering consultancy under the name Macrocon Systems Limited. A major project handled by Macrocon Systems was the deregulation of Nigerian Telecommunications and the establishment of the regulator, the Nigerian Communications Commission, NCC, in 1992.

Maduka is currently a facilitator at the School of Media and Communication (SMC), Pan-Atlantic University. He teaches Creativity and Innovation as a course to the Masters' students.

== Corporate and public appointments ==
Maduka has served as President of the Nigerian Society of Engineers (1992–1993) and President, Nigerian Academy of Engineering (2004–2005). He was vice-chairman of the pastoral council, St. Charles Borromeo Catholic Church, Victoria Island, Lagos. He was president of Lions Club of Victoria Island and he was for several years, the foundation president of Ugo Club, Illah.

=== Positions held ===
- Chairman, board of Bendel Broadcasting Service (BBS)
- Chairman, board of LTC Advertising (JWT Nigeria)
- Chairman, board of Magnum Trust Bank
- Chairman, board of NITEL
- Chairman, board of Radix Capital Partners Limited
- Chairman, Development Alternatives and Resource Center (DARC)
- Director, LTC Advertising
- Fellow, Nigerian Society of Engineers
- Foundation Fellow, Nigerian Academy of Engineering
