= Patrick Chuka =

Nigerian artist

- Born: 17 March 2000 (age 25); Victoria Island, Lagos State, Nigeria
- Years active: 2015–present
- Known for: Drawing
- Movement: Hyperrealism
- Website: artistchuka.com

Patrick Chuka (born 17 March 2000), professionally known as Chu, is a Nigerian artist who primarily works with charcoal and ballpoint pen. He also paints with oil, pastel and acrylic, largely focusing his art on realism and some aspect of hyperrealism.

== Early life and education ==
Chuka was born in Victoria Island, Lagos State in a family of four, where he is the first child. He is from Abba, Nwangele, Imo State, Nigeria. Due to family crises while growing up, his family relocated a lot, forcing him to change from one secondary school to another. From 2010 to 2011, he went to Federal Government College, Odogbolu, Ogun State, Nigeria for his secondary school education, he moved to Top Highflyer College, Isolo, Lagos State, from 2012 to 2014, before moving again to Weenoble International School, Ejigbo, Lagos State, where he finally finished in 2015. He started making art at 15, immediately after graduating from secondary school. Chuka later moved to the United States with his family in 2018. He is currently a student of Berkeley City College, Berkeley, California, USA, where he is studying Biology.

== Style and philosophy ==
Chuka works primarily with charcoal and ballpoint pen. He paints with oil, pastel, acrylic and also sculpt. He has drawn attention to trending topics such as feminism, marriage rights for minorities, LGBTQ rights and gender equality with his art.

In 2018, he explained why he gets angry when reading the Bible. He criticized Solomon for asking God for Wisdom.

== Features ==
On 16 January 2018, Chuka had a drawing of his included in Brittle Paper in "14: An Anthology of Queer Art, Vol. 2: The Inward Gaze."

On 30 October, Patrick was featured on BBC.
