= Rotimi Babatunde =

Nigerian writer and playwright

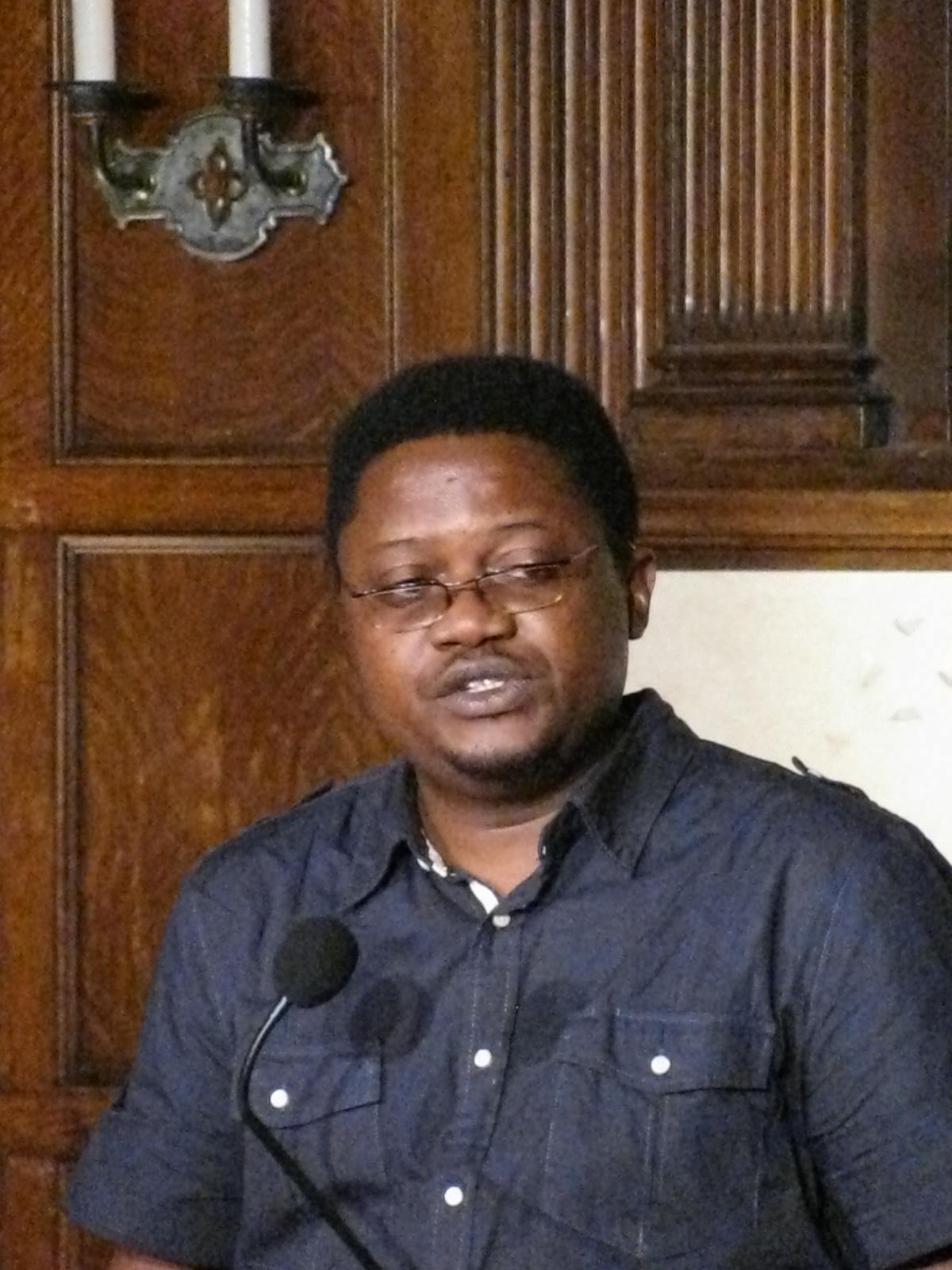
- Babatunde (2013); Photo by Slowking
- Citizenship: Nigerian
- Writing career
- Notable awards: 2012 Caine Prize

Rotimi Babatunde is a Nigerian writer and playwright.

== Biography and education ==
Rotimi Babatunde was born in Ado-Ekiti, Ekiti State, Nigeria, where he attended St. Joseph's Nursery and Primary School before going on to secondary education at the Federal Government College, Odogbolu, and subsequently to Obafemi Awolowo University, Ile-Ife.

Rotimi Babatunde lives in Ibadan, Oyo State, Nigeria.

== Works ==
His published work includes poems and stories in anthologies, including Little Drops, A Volcano of Voices and Die Aussenseite des Elementes. Babatunde's plays have been presented at institutions such as London's Institute of Contemporary Arts, the Swedish National Touring Theatre and the Halcyon Theatre, Chicago, as well as being broadcast on the BBC World Service. His other works includes:

- An Infidel In The Upper Room, Royal Court Theatre Downstairs, London (reading), 2006.
- The Bonfire of the Innocents (Elddopet), Riksteatern, Stockholm, 2008.
- A Shroud For Lazarus, Halcyon Theatre, Chicago, 2009.
- Feast, Young Vic Theatre, 25 January 2013.

== Award and Prizes ==
Babatunde won the Meridian Tragic Love Story Competition (hosted and organized by the BBC World Service). He is also a winner of the AWF Cyprian Ekwensi Prize for Short Stories.

His next work is a novel on choice, migration and love. His short story "The Collected Tricks of Houdini" was longlisted for the 2015 Sunday Times EFG Private Bank Short Story Award, the richest prize in the world for a single short story.

In 2012, Babatunde won the Caine Prize for African Writing for "Bombay's Republic", a short story about a Nigerian soldier who is enlisted to fight as an allied soldier in Burma during the Second World War. Chosen from five shortlisted options, the story was described by chair judge Bernardine Evaristo as

...ambitious, darkly humorous and in soaring, scorching prose exposes the exploitative nature of the colonial project and the psychology of independence.

In April 2014 Babatunde was named in the Hay Festival's Africa39 project as one of the 39 Sub-Saharan African writers under the age of 40 with the potential and the talent to define the trends of the region.
