= Simeon Adebo =

Nigerian administrator, lawyer and diplomat

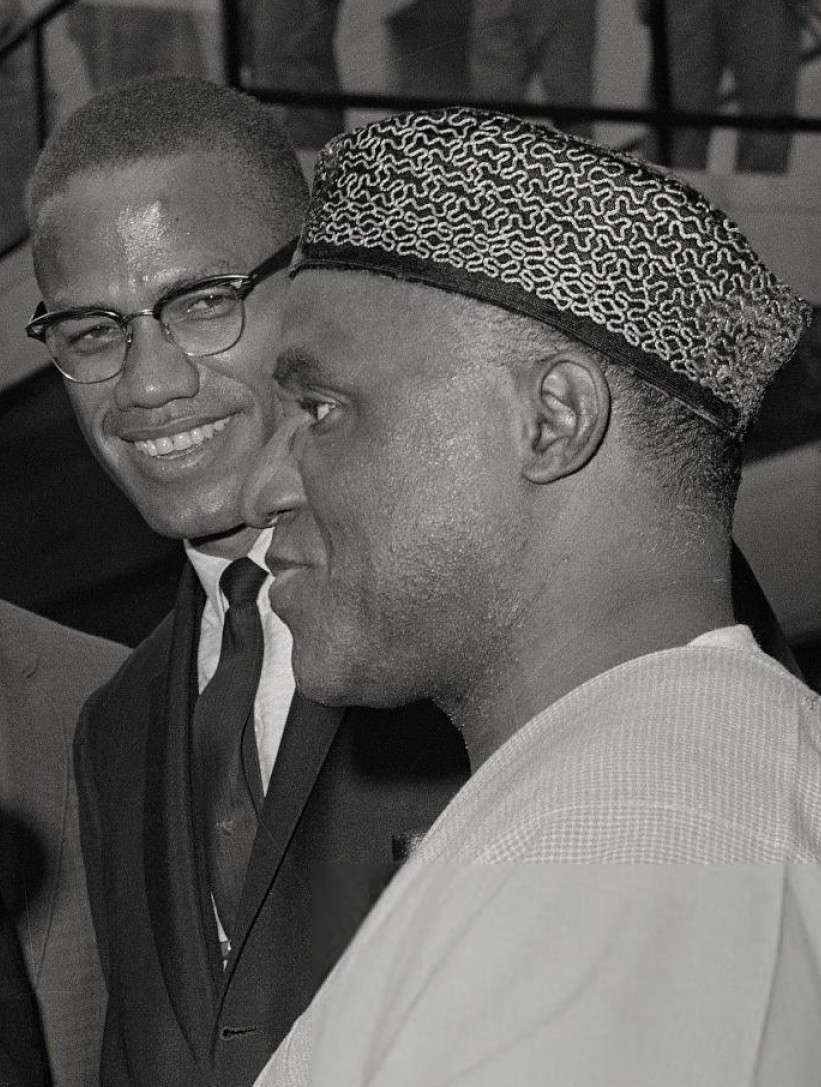
- Adebo (right) and Malcolm X in 1964

Okanlawon of Egbaland

Personal details
- Born: 4 October 1913
- Died: 30 August 1994
- Citizenship: Nigerian

Chief Simeon Olaosebikan Adebo (4 October 1913 - 30 September 1994) was a Nigerian administrator, lawyer and diplomat who served as a United Nations Under-Secretary General. He was the former head of the civil service in Nigeria's old Western Region. As a chieftain of the Yoruba people residing in the historic mountain stronghold of Abeokuta, he held the title of the Okanlomo of Egbaland.

== Education ==
He finished his secondary education at King's College, Lagos in 1932 and studied law at London School of Economics, where upon graduation he was admitted to the bar.

== Career ==
Adebo worked at the Federal Ministry of Finance and in 1961 became head of the Civil Service and Chief Secretary to the Government of then Western Region. He was appointed Nigeria's Permanent Representative at the United Nations from 1962 to 1967 and as United Nations Under Secretary General and Executive General of the United Nations Institute for Training and Research until 1972.

After the end of the Nigerian Civil War, Nigerian Head of State General Yakubu Gowon instituted a commission to review wages and salaries of Nigerian workers and to look into means of ameliorating the economic conditions of workers, the importance of the commission was due to the rise in cost of living as a result of uncontrollable inflation during the civil war. Simeon Adebo was called to head the commission which later became known as the Adebo commission. Workers who had demanded wage increases were happy for the choice of Adebo, he was seen as an apolitical administrator who could look thoroughly into workers plight and investigate the concerns of workers in the civil and private sector. An earlier government review of wages, which called for wage increases in 1964 had been followed by the private sector.

In its first report, the commission under Adebo, recommended a COLA or Cost of Living Award for all workers, ranging from $10 increases to $24. However, the commission desired to work within the administrative structure of the 1960s and only focused on how to review and adjust technical problems of the structure instead of a total overhaul of the wage and salary system of the Federal Government or in totality that of Nigeria.

He was also the chairman of a sub-committee that reached a compromise on the intractable and explosive sharia debates of the 1977 constitutional assembly in Nigeria.

He retired as Chancellor of the University of Lagos in 1992.
