= Seye Kehinde =

Nigerian journalist

Olusaye Kehinde
- Born: Oluseye Olugbmina; 21 April 1965 (age 61); Ogun State, Nigeria
- Education: Obafemi Awolowo University
- Occupation: Journalist
- Known for: founding (People Media Limited)

Oluseye Olugbemiga Kehinde (21 April 1965) is a Nigerian journalist who was the founder of City People Group Limited.

== Early life ==
Kehinde was born is Ishara Ogun State, Nigeria although his parents were both civil servant. He had his diploma of journalism and holds a bachelor of arts in history and political science at Obafemi Awolowo University and also acquire his certificate of NYSC in Kwara State Polytechnic.

== Career ==
He began working as a journalist there he was a reporter in Newswatch, holding the position of library assistant in 1986 and also works with following newspaper; Herald in 1988, the insider Confidential newsletter as a senior correspondent in 1989, head in International Desk in 1990, senior writer in Tribune in 1991 and works with the African Concord as a staff writer from 1991 to his retirement in 1992 when president Ibrahim Babangida recreate the African Concord Press and was invited to African Guardian as an assistant editor there he served from 1992 to 1994, he also works with the TheNEWS magazine as senior editor and chief editor in Tempo magazine before in 1995 he began setting up The City People Magazine.

He was also among the founding team of PM News.
