= Fisayo Ajisola =

Nigerian actress

- Born: Oluwafisayo Ajibola Ajisola; Lagos, Lagos State, Nigeria
- Other name: Freezon
- Citizenship: Nigeria
- Education: Federal University of Agriculture, Abeokuta
- Occupations: Actress, Singer, Model
- Years active: 2011 – present
- Known for: her role in Jenifa's Diary
- Notable work: This Life
- Website: www.jef.org.ng

Fisayo Ajisola, also known as Freezon, is a Nigerian television and film actress, model and singer, best known for her role in the Nigerian sitcom Jenifa's Diary, alongside Funke Akindele. She is also known for her roles in the television series; This Life, Nectar, Shadows, Burning Spear, Circle of Interest and The Story of Us. She is a graduate of Biochemistry from the Federal University of Agriculture, Abeokuta (FUNAAB), Ogun State.

== Early life ==
Fisayo was born in Lagos, Nigeria and is the last of four children of her parents. She is of Yoruba descent and hails from Ayedun in Ekiti state, southwest Nigeria. Ajisola began taking part in plays and drama skits, while in high school at the Federal Government College (FGC) Odogbolu, Ogun State. In July 2010, she enrolled at Wale Adenuga's PEFTI School for Acting in Lagos, Nigeria, where she studied Acting. Her first notable performance, was at the Nnena and Friends Show, on October 1, 2010, where she presented a musical performance. While at University, Ajisola founded the non-governmental organization (NGO), Jewel Empowerment Foundation with the mission to stem the tide of societal menace by focusing on the empowerment of the youth and the mentoring of children.

== Career ==
Fisayo began her acting career in 2011, with feature roles in the Nigerian television series, Tinsel, Burning Spear and Circle of Interest. She took a break from acting in September 2011 when she gained admission into the University. Ajisola launched her film-making career in 2016, with the production of the feature film Road to Ruin, in collaboration with her foundation, the Jewel Empowerment Foundation (JEF), with the intention of soliciting the government to take action in the provision of jobs for underprivileged Nigerian youths. Actor Raphael Niyi Stephen, who stars in the film, said: "The movie is a way of making people know what is happening to kids and also to lend our voices to what the government is doing about hawking, letting people know hawking isn’t the last option."

== Filmography ==
=== Television ===
Year	Title	Role	Producer/Director	Notes
2011	Tinsel	Co-star	Tope Oshin Ogun	Mnet TV series
2011	Burning Spear	Lead	Akin Akindele	TV Drama Series
2011	Circle of Interest	Co-star	Kalu Anya	TV series
2012	Shadows	Lead	Tunde Olaoye	TV series
2014	Nectar	Co-star	Sola Sobowale	TV series
2015	This Life	Supporting role	Wale Adenuga	TV series
2016	Jenifa's Diary	Co-star	Funke Akindele	Sitcom

== See also ==
- List of Yoruba people
- List of Nigerian Actresses
