= Olubunmi Ayodeji Adetunmbi =

Nigerian politician (born 1955)

Nigerian Senator from Ekiti North
- In office 11 June 2019 – 11 June 2023
- Preceded by: Duro Faseyi
- Succeeded by: Cyril Fasuyi

Personal details
- Born: Olubunmi Ayodeji Adetunmbi; 22 August 1955 (age 71) Ido-Ekiti, Western Region, British Nigeria (now in Ekiti State, Nigeria)
- Party: All Progressives Congress
- Education: Ifaki Grammar School, Ifaki Ekiti; Ekitiparapo college, Ido-Ekiti; Polytechnic Ibadan
- Alma mater: University of Ibadan

Olubunmi Ayodeji Adetumbi File(born 22 August 1955) is a Nigerian politician and a Senator of the 9th National Assembly where he represented Ekiti North Senatorial District under the flag of The All Progressive Congress.

== Political life ==
Adetunmbi was elected on February 23, 2019, as the Senator representing Ekiti North against the incumbent, Senator Duro Faseyi, with Adetunmbi gaining a total of 60,689 votes and Faseyi's votes numbering 49,209.

He was also a former member of the Senate in the 7th Assembly which spanned 2011–2015 where he won an award of best 7th Senator of the year.

== Personal life ==
Adetumbi was born on August 22, 1955. He attended the University of Ibadan. He has a BSc in Agricultural Economics and also an MSc in Agricultural Economics.

== Awards and honours ==
- Senate Media Corps Awards for Legislative Intellectualism (2014)
