= News Agency of Nigeria =

Government media agency

News Agency of Nigeria (NAN)
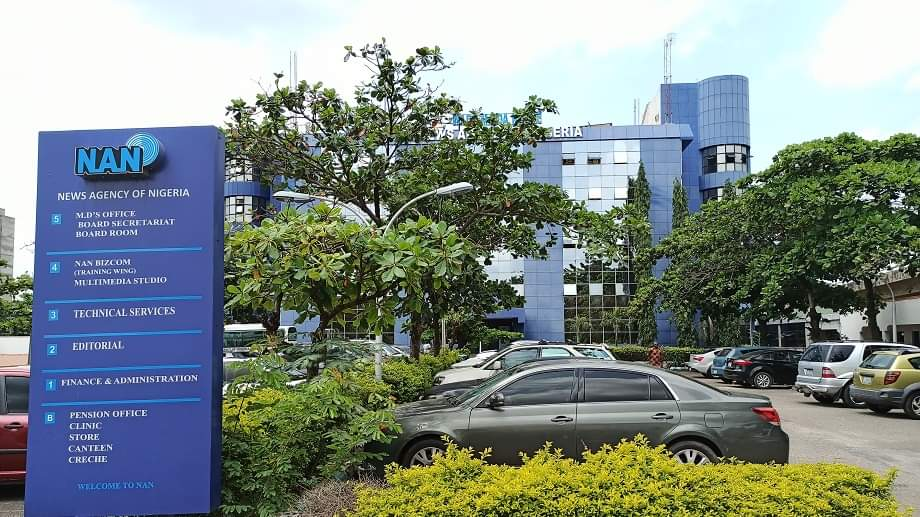
- Type: Federal State Unitary Enterprise
- Industry: State news agency
- Founded: 10 May 1976; 50 years ago
- Headquarters: Abuja, Nigeria
- Area served: Worldwide
- Key people: Buki Ponle
- Products: News media
- Owner: Wholly owned by federal government (as federal unitary enterprise)
- Website: www.nannews.ng

The News Agency of Nigeria (NAN) is a news reporting agency owned and run by the Federal Government of Nigeria just like Nigerian Television Authority. NAN was formed in part to disseminate news easily across the country and to the international community and also as a means to counter negative stories about Nigeria.

== History ==
On 10 May 1976, a decree establishing the agency was promulgated into law but its operations began two years after. In March 1978, a board of directors was inaugurated while on 2 October 1978 pilot news operations began.

NAN provides General News Service to subscribers in three bulletins published daily. The agency's website was launched on 8 August 2016, to offer news to the worldwide audience interested in news primarily about Nigeria.

In 2019, NAN signed a content-sharing agreement with Xinhua News Agency.

The agency has a network of reporters covering all the states of the federation proving to be a valuable source of news reports published by regional and national newspapers who lack a country wide coverage.

== Managing Director ==
NAN's Managing Director has been:

- Bayo Onanuga (2016–2020)
- Buki Ponle (2020–2023)
- Ali Mohammed Ali (2023–present)
