= Premium Times =

Nigerian online newspaper

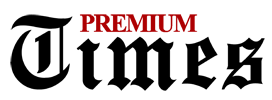
- Premium Times logo
- Type: Online newspaper
- Publisher: Dapo Olorunyomi
- Editor-in-chief: Musikilu Mojeed
- Managing editor: Idris Akinbajo
- Founded: 2011; 15 years ago
- Language: English; Hausa
- Headquarters: Abuja, Nigeria
- Website: premiumtimesng.com

Premium Times is a Nigerian online newspaper based in Abuja, the capital of Nigeria. The newspaper was launched in 2011. The online medium is notable for investigative journalism and reports, among other fields.

== Recognition ==
- Nominated for the "Website/blog of the year" award at the Nigerian Broadcasters Merit Award (2013)
- Pulitzer Prize for participating in the international consortium that investigated the Panama Papers, revealing corruption and offshore tax havens used by highly placed people (2017).
- Global Shining Light Award for the investigative work on the extrajudicial killings in Nigeria's South-East and how the Onitsha Massacre of pro-Biafra supporters was coordinated (2017).
- Lagos state governor's award and commendation for gender-sensitive reportage (2023).

== See also ==
- List of Nigerian newspapers
