= Sola Akinyede =

Nigerian politician

Sola Steven Akinyede

Senator for Ekiti South
- In office 29 May 2007 – 29 May 2011
- Preceded by: Bode Olowoporoku
- Succeeded by: Abiodun Christine Olujimi

Personal details
- Born: 24 January 1954 (age 72) Ekiti State, Nigeria

Sola Steven Akinyede (born 24 February 1954) was elected Senator for the Ekiti South constituency of Ekiti State, Nigeria, taking office on 29 May 2007 and served till May 2011. He is a member of the People's Democratic Party (PDP).

Akinyede attended King's College Lagos, earned a Bachelor of Law degree, barrister at law and master's degree in law and became a legal practitioner. He was appointed pro-chancellor of the Michael Okpara University of Agriculture, Umudike. He was a member of the Constituent Assembly (1998) and of the National Political Reform Conference (2005). After taking his seat in the Senate, he was appointed to committees on Judiciary, Human Rights & Legal Matters, Federal Capital Territory and Drugs Narcotics Anti Corruption.

In a mid-term evaluation of Senators in May 2009, ThisDay noted that he had sponsored bills to amend the laws governing the Economic and Financial Crimes Commission, the Independent Corrupt Practices and Other Related Offences Commission and the National Drug Law Enforcement Agency. He had sponsored and co-sponsored several motions and had contributed to debates in plenary. In November 2009 Akinyede called for declaration of a state of emergency to tackle the problem of corruption in Nigeria.
