= Sylvester Ayodele Arise =

Nigerian senator

National Senator
- In office 2007–2011
- Constituency: Ekiti North

Personal details
- Born: 5 October 1956 (age 69) Oye Ekiti
- Party: People's Democratic Party (PDP)
- Spouse: Adebisi Arise
- Children: Moyo Seye and Bowo
- Profession: Entrepreneur, Politician

Sylvester Ayodele Arise is a Nigerian senator who represents the People's Democratic Party (PDP) in Ekiti State. He became a member of the Nigerian Senate in 2007.

== Background ==
Ayodele Arise was born on 5 October 1956. His father was a judge. He was Assistant General Secretary of the Students Union at Ibadan Polytechnic (1976–1977). He obtained an M.Sc Urban & Regional Planning from Alabama A&M University, Normal, Alabama USA in 1984. and is an A+ Certified Computer Engineer, Microsoft Certified Professional.

After teaching mathematics and then working as a town planner, he entered into business in 1981 buying and selling video players and tapes in Nigeria. In the United States, he established a Computer Training Institute. In 2000 he launched Cards Technology Limited, a company that built the first Third Party Processing Facility in Sub-Saharan Africa for MasterCard International. This paved the way for the issuance of MasterCard by banks in Nigeria to their customers thereby opening up the opportunity for Nigerians to participate in ecommerce as we know it today. He also launched Fortune Games Limited for SMS Lottery.

== Senate career ==
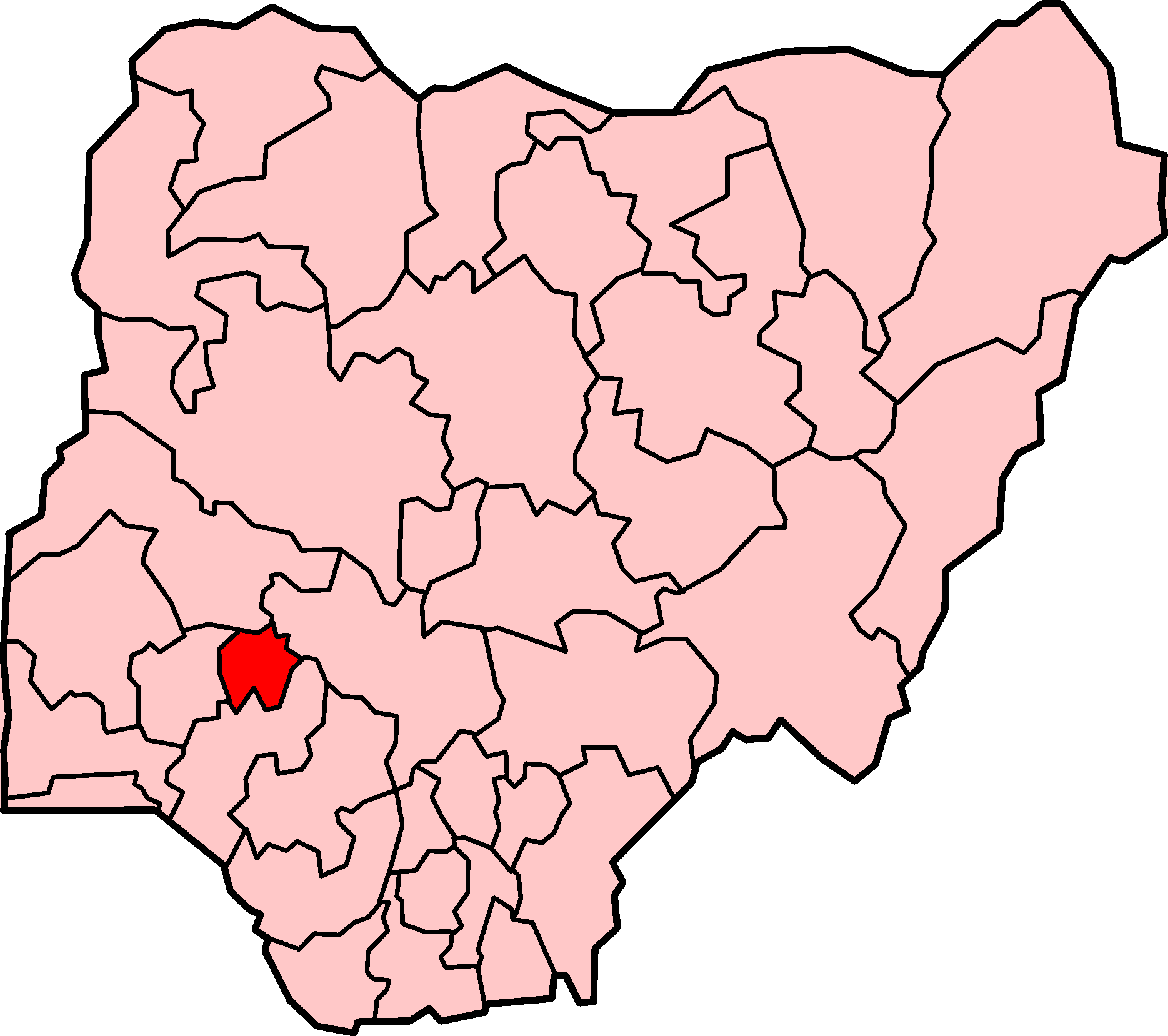
Ekiti State in Nigeria

Ayodele Arise was elected to the National Senate for the Ekiti North constituency in 2007 and was appointed as the Chairman Senate Committee on Privatization and member of other committees including Local and Foreign Debts, Water, Banking, Insurance & Other Financial Institutions.

In July 2009 a court upheld the verdict of the Ekiti State Election Petitions Tribunal, which voided Arise's election after a petition had been filed by the Action Congress candidate, Mr. Olubunmi Adetunmbi, who alleged substantial non-compliance with the Electoral Act 2006.
