= Nigerian senators of the 8th National Assembly =

Senators of the 8th National Assembly of Nigeria

The table below lists the Nigerian senators of the 8th National Assembly. The Senate included three senators from each of the 36 states, plus one senator for the Federal Capital Territory. The Senate president was Sen. Bukola Saraki of the All Progressives Congress and the deputy Senate president was Ike Ekweremadu. The Senate president and his deputy were assisted by the principal officers including the majority leader, deputy majority leader, minority leader, deputy minority leader, chief whip, deputy chief whip, minority whip and deputy minority whip.

== See also ==
- Nigerian Senate
