= Adefemi Kila =

Nigerian politician and engineer

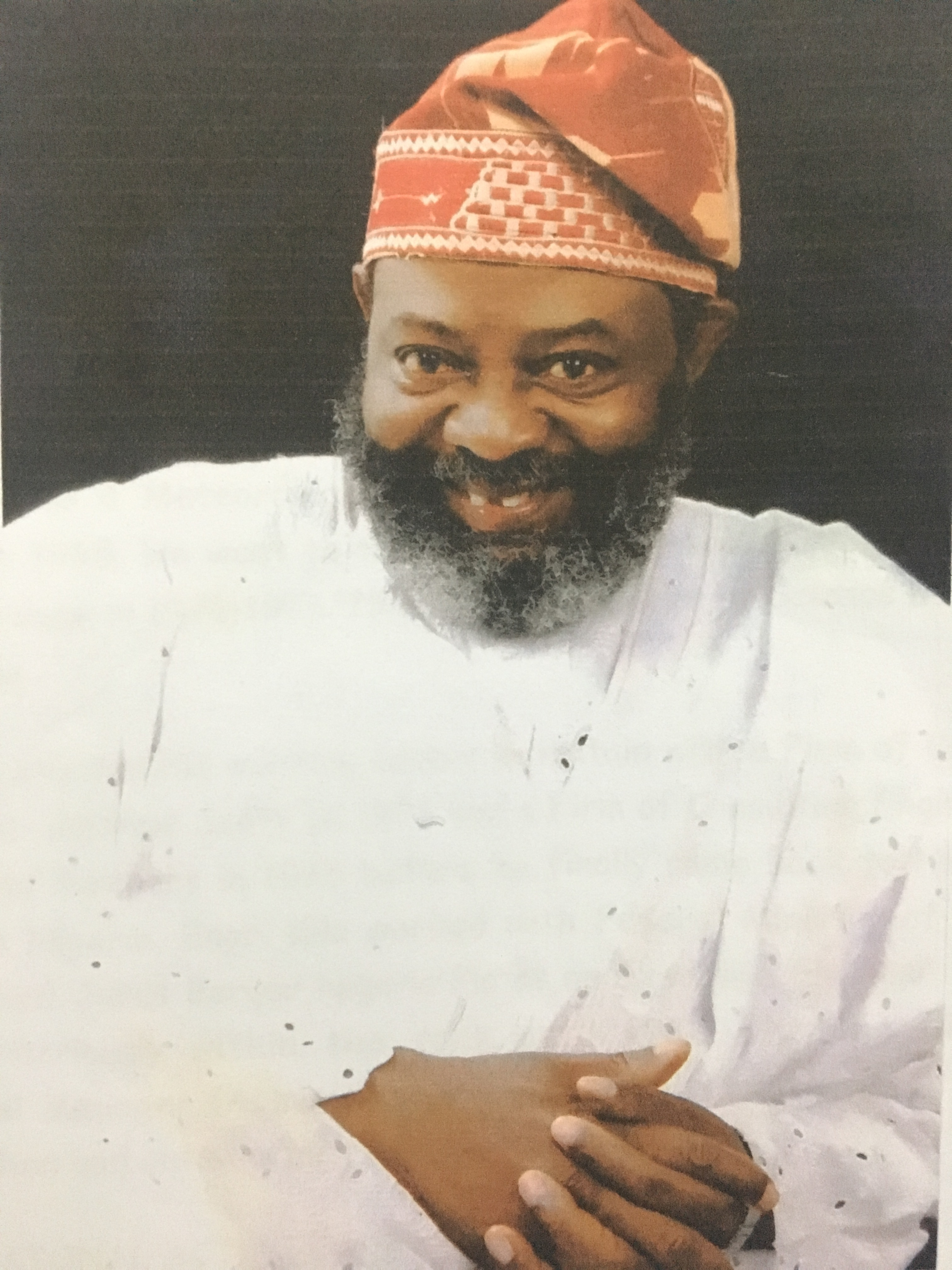
- Senator Adefemi Kila

Nigerian Senate
- In office 2007–2009
- Preceded by: Clement Awoyelu
- Succeeded by: Festus Olabode Ola
- Constituency: Ekiti Central

Personal details
- Born: 14 December 1945 (age 80) Efon Alaaye, Ekiti State
- Party: People's Democratic Party (PDP)
- Education: University of Wales Institute of Science and Technology(now Cardiff University)
- Profession: Politician & Engineer

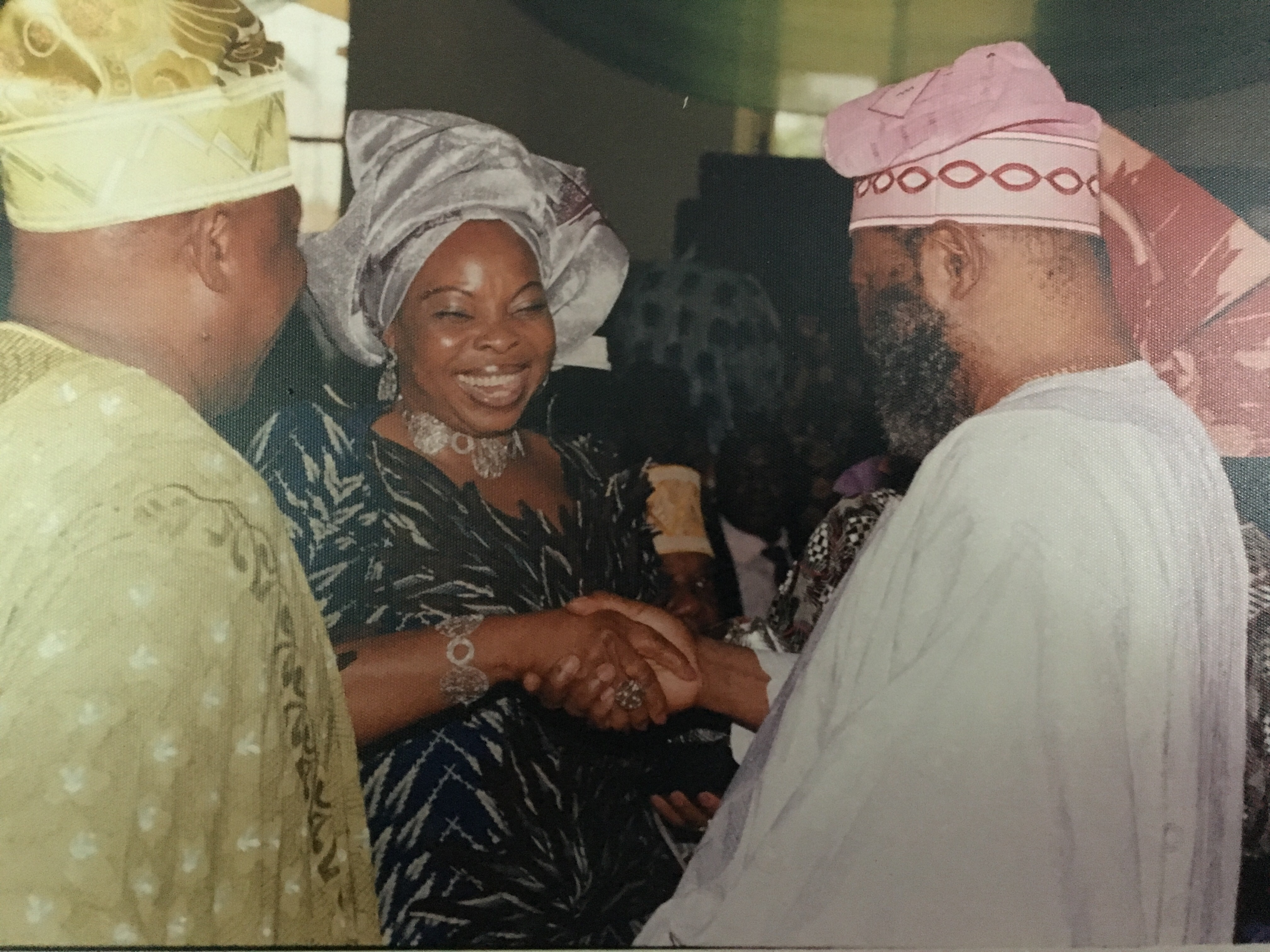
Sen Adefemi Kila & Sen Fatimat Olufunke Raji-Rasaki

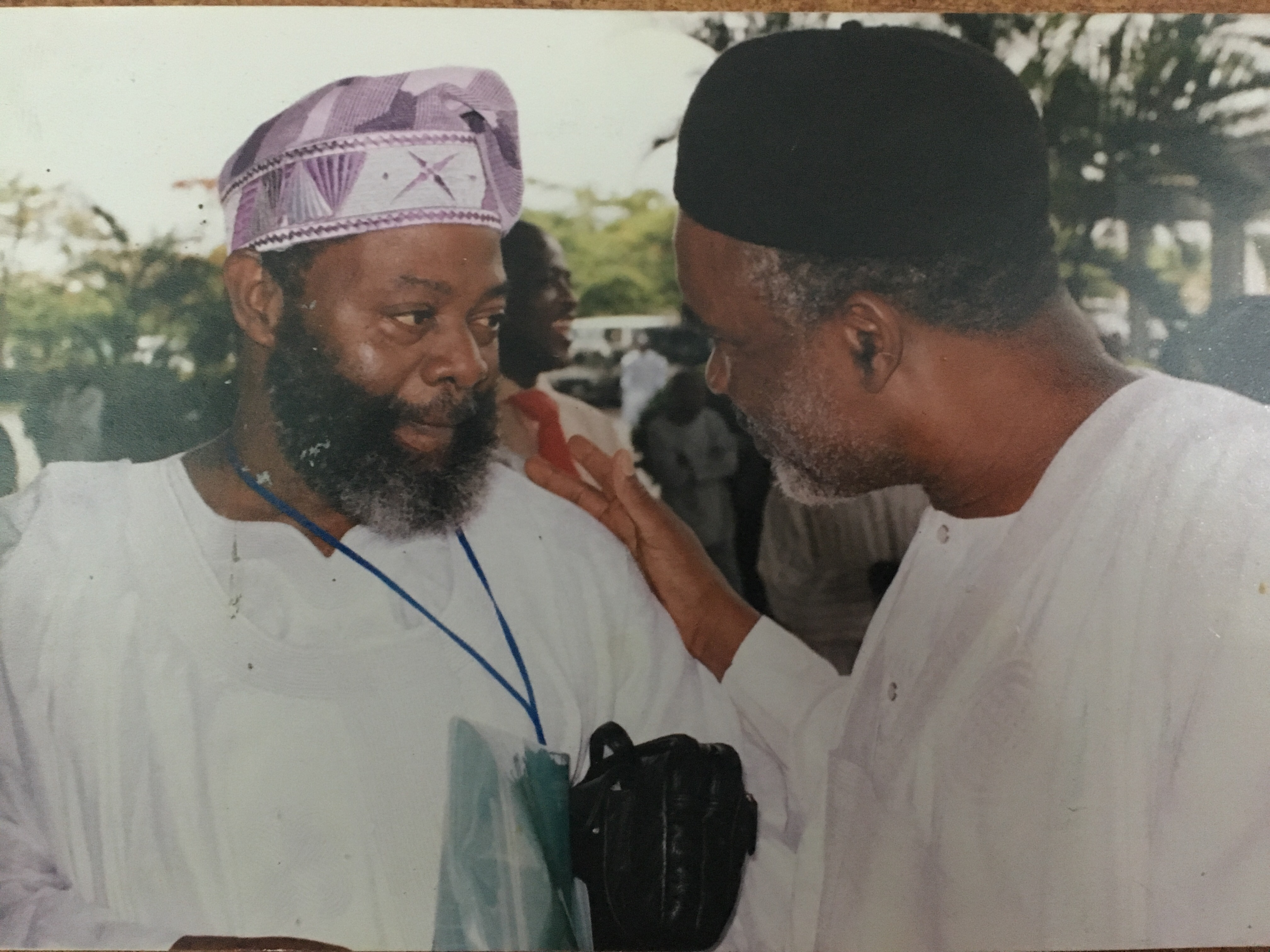
Sen Adefemi Kila and former governor of Adamawa, Murtala Nyako at a function in Ekiti State

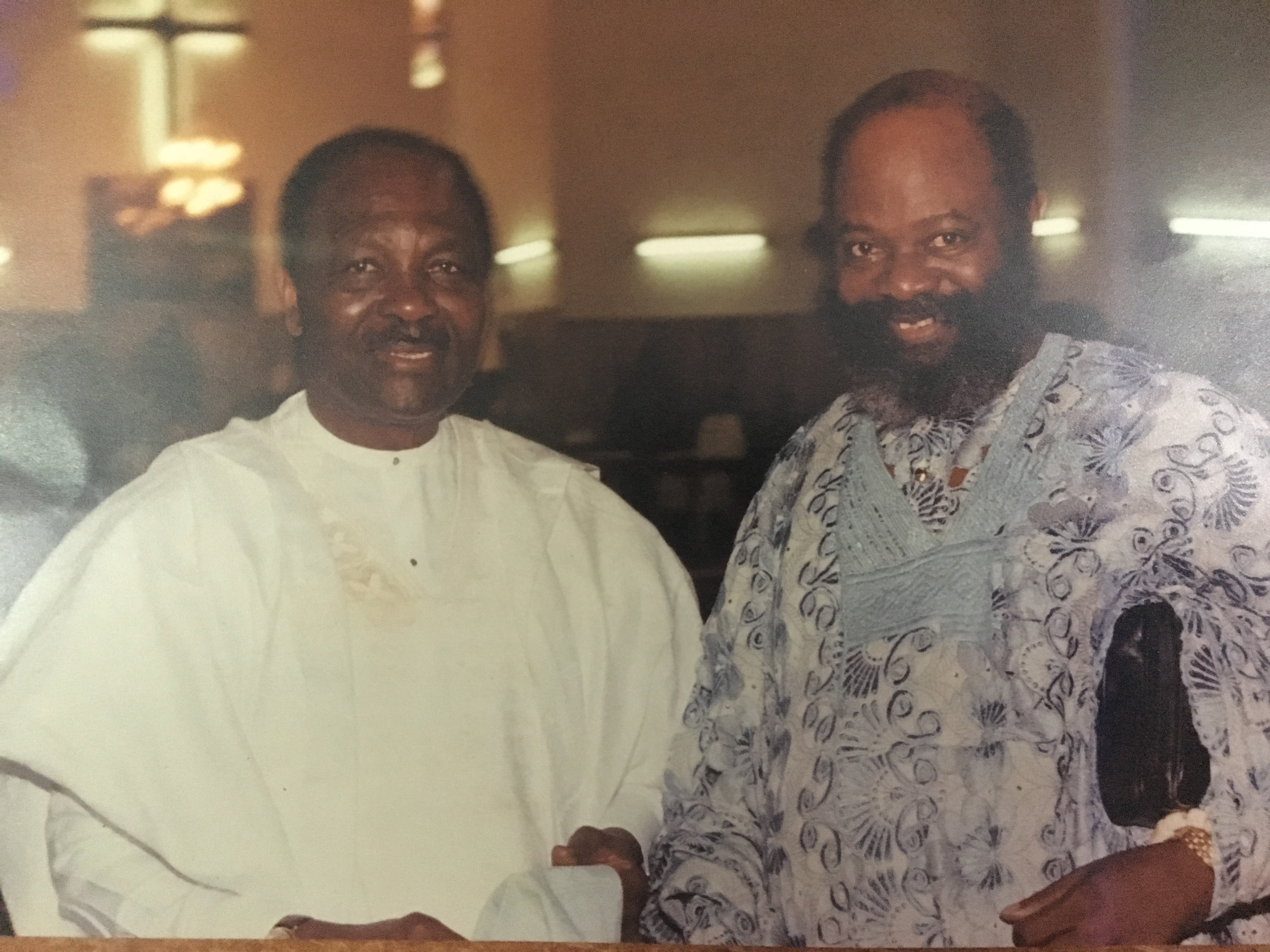
Former president Yakubu Gowon and Senator Adefemi Kila at a church function in Jos

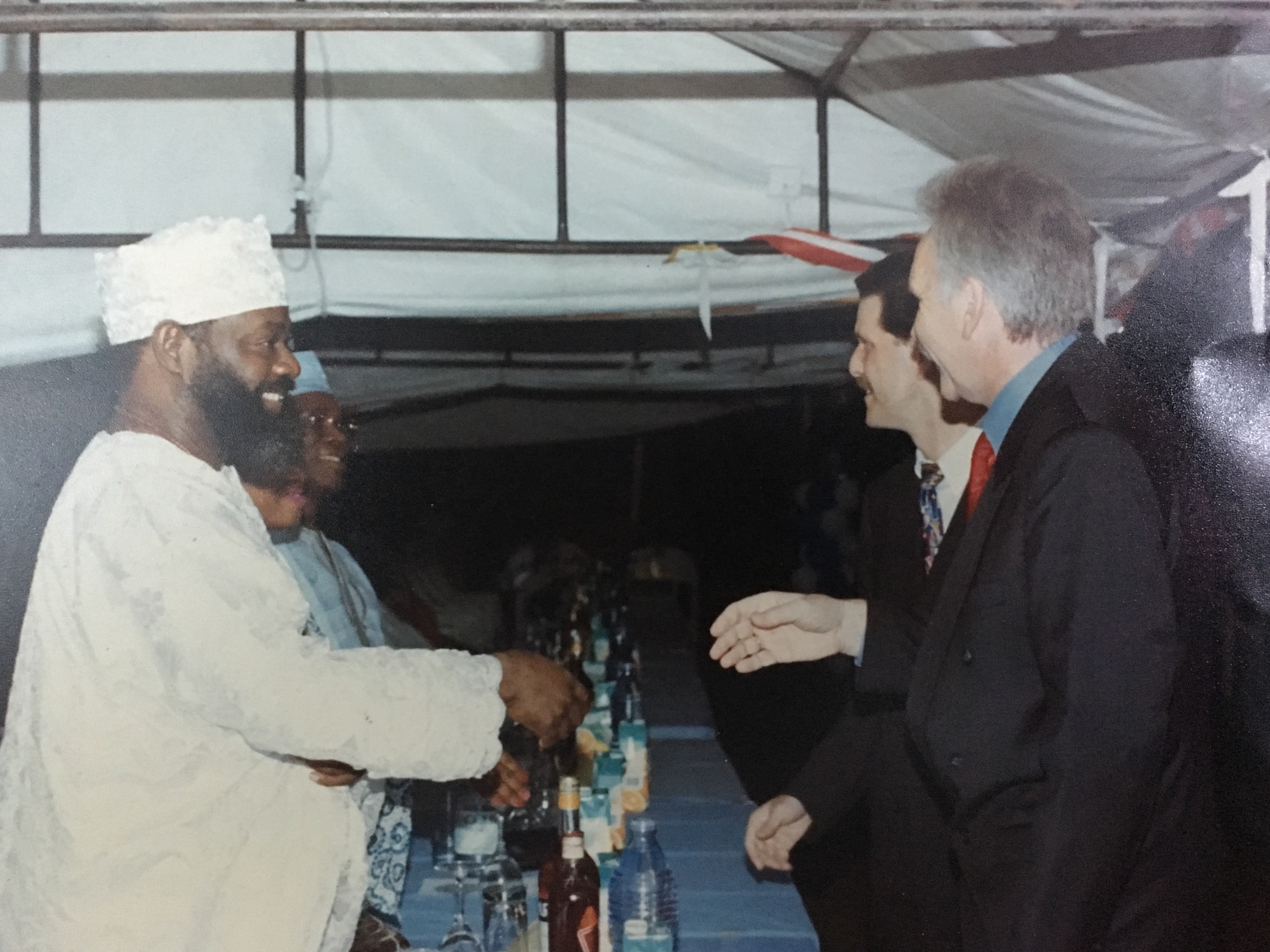
Engr Adefemi Kila with former Julius Berger (company) MD Mr Mark at the company's end of the year party

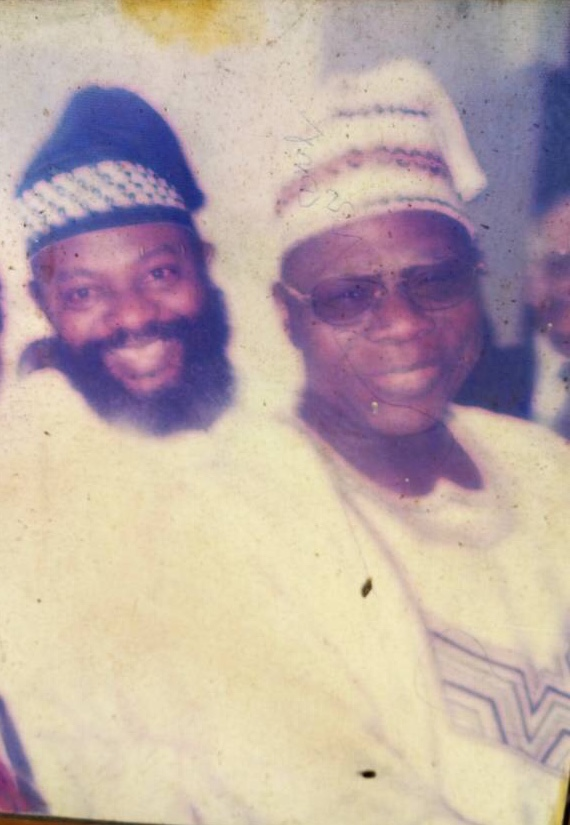
President Olusegun Obasanjo with Senator Kila

Adefemi Kila (born 14 December 1945) is a Nigerian politician and engineer who served in the Senate, representing Ekiti Central in April 2007 just after working for Julius Berger Nigerian Plc for 30 years as a civil engineer and as a technical manager (administration) for 18 years. He is currently a council member of Standards Organisation of Nigeria SON. He is a devoted Christian of the Anglican church of Nigeria.

== Biography ==
He attended the University of Wales Institute of Science and Technology (now Cardiff University) in 1970, and received a Bachelor of Science degree in civil engineering and was also awarded an honorary doctorate degree (PhD in business administration) of Bradley University, Lacey, Washington, D.C., US, April 2002.

He started his engineering career with a firm of construction engineers – Andrew Scott in 1974 and a firm of consulting engineers – LH. Dobbie and partners in 1975 before joining Julius Berger Nigeria Plc in 1976 to 2007 and was promoted to the rank of a technical manager in 1986, a post he held for 18 years before retirement.

He became a board member of the National Directorate of Employment (NDE) in 1987. He is an executive council member of Nigerian Society of Engineers (NSE); He represented NSE at the 2014 CONFAB. He later became the director, National Road Federation (NRF) and also an executive board of directors of International Road Federation (IRF), Washington, D.C., US, representing Nigerian Road Federation (NRF) and the Federal Government of Nigeria. He is also a member of the board of trustees of the Nigerian-American Foundation, Miami, Florida, US.

He was the president of the Federation of Construction Industry (FOCI) http://www.foci.org.ng/about/, (formerly Federation of Building and Civil Engineering Contractors in Nigeria. (FOBACEC) May 1996 – 2001. He also became the vice-president of COREN (Council for Regulation of Engineering in Nigeria http://www.coren.gov.ng/). He was pioneer President General, Senior Staff Consultative Association of Nigeria (SESCAN) now Trade Union Congress (TUC). He is currently a Council Member of Save Democracy Africa (SDA).

== Senate career ==
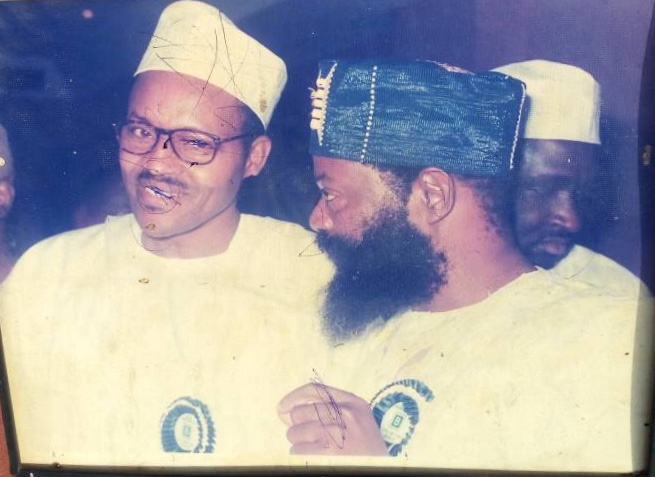
Chief Kila with president Muhammadu Buhari (then the executive chairman of Petroleum Trust Fund)

Adefemi Kila was elected senator for Ekiti Central senatorial district and was an active member of key committees during which he made landmark achievements as the vice chairman of Senate Committee on Works; at this time he helped in facilitating the completion of Sango Ota bridge that was long abandoned; also the ita-awure efon iwaraja road hitherto has been abandoned for over 30 years. He was also involved in normalisation of many land disputes in the Federal Capital Territory during his tenure as a member of Senate Committee on Works. He also was chairman of the sub-committee for projects in the North-Central and South-West regions.

=== Senate appointments ===
- Vice Chairman Senate committee of works. Consequently, chairman sub committee on Federal Roads Maintenance Agency (FERMA)
- Member, Senate Committee on State and Local Government.
- Member Senate Committee on Solid Mineral
- Member Senate Committee on FCT
- Member Senate Committee on Upstream Petroleum
- Member Senate Committee on Drugs, Narcotics and anti-corruption
- Member Senate Committee on Privatisation
- Member Senate Committee on ID card and National Population
- Member Senate Committee on Constitutional Review

==== Activities on the floor of the Senate ====
- Senate Committee for the investigation of FCT Land Allocation and petitions 1999–2007.
- Senate Committee for the screening of EFCC chairperson.
- Senate Committee for the screening of Chief E.F Shonekan and 6 other members of the Infrastructural Accessioning Regulatory Commission (ICRC)
- Senate Delegation to Bakassi peninsula before eventual handover to Cameroon.
- Member, Joint Committee on the Review of 1999 constitution

=== Recognition Award received while in the Senate ===
Some of the awards earned in recognition of his contribution to national development while in the senate includes but are not limited to:

- AMA Award for Transparent Leadership 2008
- AMA Award for role models 2008
- Ekiti State Best Senator of the year 2008
- Igede Youth patrons award
- Africa youth Intl. Excellence in leadership award.

== Professional activities ==
On the professional scene, Kila is a fellow of various institutions, including:

- Fellow, Nigerian Society of Engineering (FNSE)
- Fellow, Nigerian Institute of Building (FNIOB)
- Fellow, Institute of Corporate Administration (FICA)
- Fellow, Nigerian Institute of Civil Engineers (FNICE)
- Pioneering president, Nigerian Institute of Civil Engineers
- Registered member, Council for Regulation of Engineering in Nigeria (COREN)
- Registered member, Council of Registered Builders of Nigeria (CORBON)
- Member, Nigerian Road Federation (NRF)

== General work responsibilities ==
Kila started his Nigerian engineering career in Julius Berger Nigeria Plc in 1976 at the Design Office, designing water-retaining structures, heavy foundations, principally for Apapa Wharf Extension and bridge works. In 1977, Kila was moved to the Lagos Inner Ring Road and was later posted to Marina Bridge, where he was in charge of the construction from the northern foreshore to the end of Apongbon, Lagos. However, at the end of the project he was promoted to full civil engineer.

In 1979, he was moved to Carter Bridge and placed in charge of all precast units and the pedestrian bridge of the Carter Bridge. At the end of the project, he was promoted to senior engineer.

In 1980–1982, Kila was in charge of sign bridges for the Inner Ring Road and was also in charge of some industrial buildings and roads within Lagos Municipality. At the successful completion of the projects, he was promoted to chief engineer.

In continuation of his work in 1982, Kila was put in charge of construction of industrial buildings nationwide. Due to his performances on the job and coupled with his administrative ability, he was promoted to the post of technical manager (administration) in 1986. He was subsequently moved to the headquarters, taking full responsibility for general administration works, which includes among others, human resources development, training of staff, and corporate representation of the company at all levels of government, private sector, professional and international bodies.

== Trade union activities ==
Kila is a trade unionist and has led several successful trade union negotiations during his career.

He was the chairman of Julius Berger Nigeria Plc. Senior Staff Association for 7 years, 1979–1986.

He later became the national president of Construction and Civil Engineering Senior Staff Association, 1982–1990, and was in the forefront of the crusade for the implementation of the Federal Government's National Construction Policy.

Kila was President-General, Senior Staff Consultative Association of Nigeria (SESCAN) (now Trade Union Congress (TUC), 1985–1991).

== Management ==
Kila is an astute manager of men, money and materials, and has earned him several appointments such as:

- Council Member Standard Organisation of Nigeria (SON)
- Member of the executive board of Nigerian Society of Engineers (NSE)
- Council Member of the Nigerian Society of Engineers (NSE) and represented NSE at the 2014 CONFAB
- Board member of the National Directorate of Employment (NDE) in 1987–1988
- Director, Nigerian Road Federation (NRF)
- President, Federation of Construction Industry (FOCI), (formerly Federation of Building and Civil Engineering Contractors in Nigeria (FOBACEC) May 1996 – 2001
- Vice- President of COREN (Council for Regulation of Engineering in Nigeria)
- Pioneer President General, Senior Staff Consultative Association of Nigeria (SESCAN) now Trade Union Congress (TUC)
- Member, Executive board of directors of International Road Federation (IRF), Washington DC, USA., representing Nigerian Road Federation (NRF) and the Federal Government of Nigeria. April 1994.
- Member, Board of trustees, Nigerian-American Foundation, Miami, Fl. USA.

== Religion ==
Senator Kila is an active member of Anglican Church of Nigeria. He is a member of St. Matthew's Anglican Church Maitama, Abuja where he served as the chairman of the fund raising committee in building a church in Mabuchi. He was a member of Saint Paul's Church Ishagatedo Lagos and was a

member of FOH39Ng a society in the church. His activities in the Church made the Bishop (ADEBIYI) gave him an award of

excellence for his immense activities in the church. He is a member of Saint Mathews Church Maitama, Abuja where is performance

also earned him an award of excellence. He is a member of Saint Paul's Church Efon Alaaye, where his long-term continuous

immense activities rewarded him as the 'baba ijo' of the church- being his home town Church.

== Controversies ==
In October 2008 he defended the Federal Roads Maintenance Agency in Benue State, blaming problems on poor funding. In May 2008, he was among four senators on the screening committee who appeared to be delaying the assumption of office by the nominated chairman of the Economic and Financial Crimes Commission (EFCC), Mrs. Farida Mzamber Waziri. He later lost his seat in the senate at the court of appeal to Festus Olabode Ola in 2009 after previously winning the case at the Tribunal.
