= Charles Ateba Eyene =

Cameroonian writer, politician and teacher (1972–2014)

Charles Sylvestre Ateba Eyene
- Born: 15 January 1972; Bikoka, Cameroon
- Died: 21 February 2014; Yaoundé, Cameroon
- Occupations: Writer, Politician, Teacher

Charles Sylvestre Ateba Eyene (15 January 1972 – 21 February 2014) was a Cameroonian writer, politician, and teacher.

== Biography ==
Charles Ateba Eyene was born on 15 January 1972, in Bikoka, in the Ocean department (South Region) of Cameroon. In his memoirs, he recounts being marked by the expulsion of his family from their home to accommodate two French soldiers (including Pierre Messmer), forcing them to sleep in the garden. He describes the frequent raids and searches by the military, who confiscated wool blankets, poultry, goats, sheep, and pigs to feed the soldiers.

A prolific essayist, he was an alternate member of the central committee of the Cameroon People's Democratic Movement (RDPC) and a teacher at the International Relations Institute of Cameroon (IRIC).

He held a PhD from the UNESCO Chair. His thesis, titled "Media Expression of Sociopolitical Forces and the Challenge of Preserving Social Peace in Cameroon: A Socio-Communicational Approach to Four Titles of the Francophone Cameroonian Press, 1990-1997 (Le Messager, La Nouvelle Expression, Le Patriote, Cameroon-Tribune)," was supervised by Professors Michel Tjade Eone and Zambo Belinga, and awarded with the distinction "very honorable." Eyene was known for his critical and sometimes controversial public statements against the ruling political system. He was also a sought-after media figure, participating in televised debates.

Shortly before his death, he was recruited as a teacher at the International Relations Institute of Cameroon (IRIC).

He died at the age of 42 on 21 February 2014, in Yaoundé. His funeral was held on 29 March in Bikoka.

== Publications ==
- Paul Biya et l'intégration socio-politique des jeunes (in French). Yaoundé. 1997. p. 139.
- La jeunesse camerounaise et l'éthique de responsabilité (in French). Yaoundé: Édition Sphinx. 1998. p. 108.
- Charles Assale m'avait dit. Hommage à un patriarche (in French). Yaoundé: Africa multimedia. 1999.
- Cameroun : comment l'ancien palais présidentiel a été pillé (in French). Yaoundé: Africa multimedia. 2000.
- Comprendre l'éthique. Du discours à la pratique (in French). Yaoundé: Africa multimedia. 2001.
- Le Général Pierre Semengue: toute une vie dans les armées (in French). Yaoundé: éditions CLE. 2002. p. 274.
- RDPC : le guide de la militante et du militant d'après les textes de base en vigueur (in French). 2003. p. 112.
- Affaire Dikoum: entretiens avec les accusés (in French). Yaoundé: Africa multimedia. 2004. p. 170.
- Le RDPC hier, aujourd'hui et demain: le temps d'un regard militant et citoyen (in French). Yaoundé. 2005. p. 155.
- Recueil de propositions militantes pour revitaliser le RDPC (in French). Yaoundé: Africa multimedia. 2006.
- Stratégies de corruption et de détournement des fonds publics comme logique de coup d'État: remèdes (in French). Yaoundé: Éditions Saint-Paul. 2006. p. 144.
- Destruction du RDPC à la base: analyse des stratégies des uns et des autres (in French). 2007. p. 48.
- Marketing et communication politiques: clé du succès pour les élections, la vie publique et la promotion de la démocratie (in French). Yaoundé: Éditions Saint-Paul. 2007. p. 128.
- Les paradoxes du pays organisateurs. Élites productrices ou prédatrices. Le cas de la province du Sud à l'ère Biya, 1982-2007 (in French). Yaoundé: Éditions Saint-Paul. 2008.
- RDPC, la reprise en main du parti par le président national: les faits et gestes qui le prouvent (in French). Yaoundé: Éditions Saint-Paul. 2010. p. 119.
- Le management de l'opacité et les drames de la société camerounaise: l'insolite et la complaisance au détriment du mérite et de la compétence (in French). Yaoundé: Éditions Saint-Paul. 2010. p. 316.
- Le mouvement sportif camerounais pris en otage par des braconniers: l'urgence de la mise en œuvre des réformes : une analyse historico-économique et politico-diplomatique du sport (in French). Yaoundé: Éditions Saint-Paul. 2011. p. 290.
- La pénétration de la Chine en Afrique et les espoirs de la rupture du pacte colonial avec l'occident: pour une coopération sino-camerounaise en béton (in French). Éditions Saint-Paul. 2010. p. 149.
- Émergence du Cameroun à l'horizon 2035: l'apport de la Chine : la coopération de développement, ses succès et ses craintes (in French). Yaoundé: Éditions Saint-Paul. 2012. p. 188.
- Charles Ateba Eyene; Ch Pascal Messanga Nyamding; André-Marie Yinda Yinda (2012). Le Cameroun sous la dictature des Loges, des sectes, du magico-anal et des réseaux mafieux: de véritables freins contre l'émergence en 2035 (in French). Yaoundé: Éditions Saint-Paul. p. 381.
- Crimes rituels, loges, sectes, pouvoirs, drogues et alcools au Cameroun: les réponses citoyennes et les armes du combat (in French). Yaoundé: Éditions Saint-Paul. 2013. p. 228.

== See also ==
- Martinez Zogo
