= City People Magazine =

Magazine in Nigeria

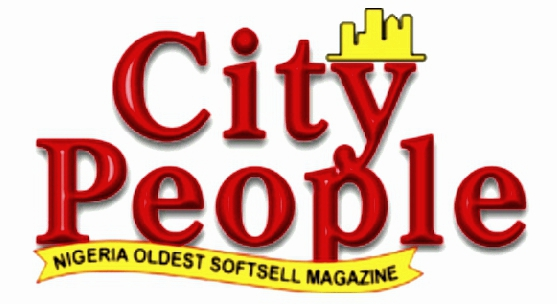
- Editor: Bola Ade
- Categories: Newspaper and event award
- Publisher: City People Group
- Founder: Seye Kehinde
- Founded: 1996
- Company: City People Media Group
- Country: Nigeria
- Language: English
- Website: citypeopleonline.com

The City People Magazine is a Nigerian soft-sell, entertainments magazine and newspaper awarding political people artists, actors and newspapers in publication of City People Media Group.

== About magazine ==
The magazine was founded by City People Media Group in 1996 circulating all Nigerian regions, with the annual awarding event came to exist in 2005 together with City People Entertainment and was also launched in Ghana in 2009 by the high commissioner of Nigeria to Ghana, before the City People Group Media, it was published under Media Techniques Limited.

The City People Group Media was founded by Oluseye Olugbemiga Kehinde, a journalist who was publisher in African Confidential and once editor in Herald newspaper, African Concord and Tempo magazine. It also awards Islamic artists which began existing in 2018. In 2012 City People Magazine awarded Airtel for the "Best Telecoms Company Of The Year 2012".
