= The African Guardian =

Defunct Nigerian newspaper

- Type: Periodical
- Format: Broadsheet
- Publisher: Guardian Magazines Limited
- Founded: 1986
- Political alignment: Pro-democracy
- Language: English
- Ceased publication: 1995; 30 years ago
- Headquarters: Oshodi
- City: Lagos
- Country: Nigeria
- ISSN: 0794-2788
- OCLC number: 14628298

The African Guardian was a Nigerian newspaper that began its publication in 1985. It went defunct in 1995 during the military junta of Sani Abacha.
