= Babafemi Ojudu =

Nigerian journalist

Senator for Ekiti Central
- In office 6 June 2011 – 6 June 2015
- Preceded by: Festus Olabode Ola
- Succeeded by: Fatimat Raji-Rasaki

Personal details
- Born: 27 March 1961 (age 65) Ado-Ekiti, Ekiti State
- Party: All Progressives Congress (APC)
- Occupation: Politician, journalist
- Profession: Journalist
- Website: senatorbabafemiojudu.com/home

Babafemi Ojudu (born 27 March 1961) is a Nigerian journalist who was elected Senator for the Ekiti Central constituency of Ekiti State, Nigeria, in the April 2011 national elections. He ran on the Action Congress of Nigeria (ACN) platform.

== Early life and education ==
Babafemi Ojudu was born on 27 March 1961 at Ado-Ekiti in Ekiti State. He attended Ado Grammar School in Ado-Ekiti (1973–77). In 1976, he won a scholarship jointly sponsored by activist lawyer Gani Fawehinmi and Jùjú musician King Sunny Adé for indigent students of the state, the start of a long-term friendship with Fawehinmi.

In 1980, Ojudu was admitted to the University of Ife, Ile-Ife to study English. He took an interest in journalism while at university, joining the Association of Campus Journalists and reporting for COBRA, a campus journal. He and two friends founded a journal called The Parrot, which he edited until graduating in 1984. On completing his National Youth Service, Ojudu worked as a reporter for The Guardian while attending the University of Lagos (1985–86), where he studied for a master's degree in political science.

He is married to his wife Mrs Omotola Olajumoke Ojudu who works with the National Open University Of Nigeria (NOUN) in the Media and Publicity Directorate and they're blessed with kids.

== Journalism ==
In 1987, Ojudu started writing for African Concord magazine, initially as a staff writer and moving up to become assistant editor. The job involved extensive travel in Nigeria and to other African countries. In 1992 he resigned in protest at a request by M.K.O. Abiola, the publisher, to apologise to President Ibrahim Babangida over an article critical of the military regime. In 1993 Ojudu and other former workers from African Concord established TheNEWS magazine, with Ojudu as its first managing editor. Gani Fawehinmi assisted in founding the newspaper with a contribution of ₦25,000. However, when Ojudu much later refused to support Fawehinmi in his campaign against Bola Tinubu, elected Lagos State Governor in 1999, Fawehinmi demanded a refund of this money. The first version of TheNEWS did not last long before it was banned by Babangida in 1993.

Years later, when Babangida said he was in interested in running for president in the 2011 democratic elections, Ojudu said that the second coming of Babangida to rule the nation should be resisted by every Nigerian who wanted progress for the country. He said "He does not have anything good to offer us. We have suffered enough in his hands... He is a trickster. Look at how many journalists were killed during his time. Look at what he did to our colleagues (journalists)... Look at what happened to our institutions when he was around. He destroyed the system and he is now seeking to come back."

Ojudu was arrested, tortured and detained several times during the Sani Abacha regime (1993–1998). Ojudu was arrested and detained for three days at the notorious Shagisha prison in the outskirts of Lagos on 11 August 1996. The cause was an article in The News about Oil Minister Dan Etete which alleged that Etete was giving government contracts on behalf of the Nigerian State Oil Company to his family and friends. Later in 1996 Ojudu went to the US for six months as a fellow at the School of Communications, Howard University, Washington, D.C.. On his return in June 1997 he was appointed Group Managing Editor of Independent Communications Network Ltd, publishers of TheNEWS magazine, P.M. News and Tempo. He was arrested on 17 November 1997 after returning from a conference in Kenya. In July 1998 (after the death of Abacha) it was reported that he was suffering from typhoid fever and jaundice, both life-threatening, caused by the unsanitary conditions in which he was detained and denial of access to medication.

In addition to his managing editor work, both before and after the return to democracy, Ojudu has been a member or chairman of several organizations and committees involved in media and human rights. In total, Ojudu spent 26 years in media practice before entering politics in 2010.

== Political career ==
Ojudu formally declared that he would run for the Senate in August 2010. He left his post as Group Managing Editor of Independent Communications Network to run for office. The 10 January 2011 primaries for ACN candidate for the Ekiti Central Senatorial seat were held in three of the five local government areas (LGAs) that make up the Senatorial district, and Ojudu won in all three. The primaries for the other two LGAs were rescheduled, but were ultimately not held. The ACN submitted Ojudu's name to the Independent National Electoral Commission (INEC) as their candidate for Ekiti Central. However, on 17 March 2011 a Federal High Court in Abuja issued a judgment that recognized the incumbent Senator Festus Bode-Ola as the Action Congress of Nigeria (ACN) candidate for Ekiti Central. The Chairman of the Ekiti State ACN, Chief Jide Awe, accused Bode Ola of forgery in the papers he had filed saying the INEC had recognized him as candidate. On 31 March 2011 the Federal High Court in Abuja set aside its 17 March judgment.

In the April 2011 election for the Ekiti Central Senatorial seat, Ojudu polled 67,747 running on the ACN platform. Labour Party (LP) candidate and former Ekiti State Governor Ayo Fayose received 29,773 votes. Kayode Alufa of the People's Democratic Party (PDP) received 29,488 votes. After conceding defeat, Alufa congratulated Ojudu, saying: "Our God in his wisdom has chosen you with your experience and good credentials, which I am sure you will deploy for the service and improvement of our impoverished area."

On 7 January 2016 Ojudu was named Special Adviser Political Matters by President Muhammadu Buhari.
