= P.M. News =

Nigerian daily English newspaper

- Type: Daily newspaper
- Publisher: Independent Communications Network Limited
- Editor: Kazeem Ugbodaga
- Founded: 1994; 32 years ago
- Language: English
- Headquarters: Lagos
- Website: http://pmnewsnigeria.com

P.M. News is a daily newspaper published in Lagos, Nigeria, by the Independent Communications Network Limited (ICNL). The company also publishes the weekly TheNEWS magazine and Tempo, a tabloid.

The News was founded in 1993 by Bayo Onanuga, Babafemi Ojudu and other former staff from the African Concord who had resigned in protest over a request by M. K. O. Abiola, the publisher, to apologise to President Ibrahim Babangida over a critical story about the military regime. Ojudu was the first Managing Editor. After harassment by the Babangida regime, there was a brief period of press freedom under General Sani Abacha during which P.M. News was launched in August 1994 as a breezy afternoon paper strongly oriented towards news but also covering fashions, sports and entertainment.

In the years that followed, P.M. News and TheNews were known for "guerrilla journalism". They were subject to constant interference by the authorities, arrests and closures. For example, in August 1996 Amnesty International reported that Editor-in-chief Bayo Onanuga was thought to be held by the State Security Service at their Lagos headquarters, and may have been ill-treated in custody. Babafemi Ojudu had been released on 13 August 1996 and had required hospital treatment as a result of ill-treatment. The two men may have been arrested due to publishing articles critical to the government. Onanuga fled from Nigeria in 1997 after hiding from state security forces for months. He returned home to resume work at ICNL in 1998, after the sudden death of Abacha and the start of the transition to democracy.
