= TheNEWS Magazine =

Nigerian news magazine

- Publisher: Independent Communications Network Limited
- Founded: February 1993
- Country: Nigeria
- Website: https://thenewsnigeria.com.ng

TheNEWS Magazine is a daily news magazine published in Nigeria by the Independent Communications Network Limited (ICNL). It was founded in February 1993 by Bayo Onanuga and Babafemi Ojudu.
