= Newspapers published in Nigeria =

Newspapers published in Nigeria has a strong tradition of the principle of "publish and be damned" that dates back to the colonial era when founding fathers of the Nigerian press such as Nnamdi Azikiwe, Ernest Ikoli, Obafemi Awolowo and Lateef Jakande used their papers to fight for independence. This tradition firmly established newspapers as a means to advocate for political reform and accountability, roles they continue to fulfill in Nigeria today.

Until the 1990s, most publications were government-owned, but private papers such as the Daily Trust, Next, Nigerian Tribune, The Punch, Vanguard and the Guardian continued to expose public and private scandals despite government attempts at suppression. These privately owned outlets were instrumental in holding leaders to account, often operating under significant pressure, including censorship and harassment during periods of military rule.

Laws related to the media, including newspapers, are scattered across various pieces of legislation. There are few good sources of discussion and analysis of these laws. The introduction of the Freedom of Information Act in 2011 marked a significant step toward transparency, granting citizens and journalists access to public records. However, enforcement has been uneven, and many media organizations still struggle to obtain crucial information from authorities.

Some Newspapers depend heavily on advertisements that may be placed by companies owned by powerful people. In some cases, this makes the papers cautious in reporting details of crimes or suspected crimes, and sometimes they carry articles that paint clearly corrupt individuals in a favourable light. The widespread practice of giving journalists "brown envelopes"—cash payments for favorable coverage—has compounded ethical challenges in Nigerian journalism. Many reporters and editors operate in environments where such practices are normalized, often blurring the lines between journalism and public relations. Although earnings have declined since the late 1980s the number of publications has steadily grown. This expansion reflects Nigerians’ continued demand for diverse sources of information, despite economic challenges affecting the industry.

An analysis of newspapers shows a strong bias towards coverage of males, reflecting prevalent cultural biases. Few articles discuss women and there are few photographs of women outside the fashion sections.

As of 2008 there were over 100 national, regional or local newspapers.

Online newspapers have become popular since the rise of internet accessibility in Nigeria; more than ten percent of the top fifty websites in the country are devoted to online newspapers. Due to improved mobile penetration and the growth of smartphones, Nigerians have begun to rely on the internet for news. Online newspapers have also been able to bypass government restrictions because content can be shared without the need for any physical infrastructure. The result has been a disruption of the traditional sources of news which have dominated the media industry. Recent online newspapers include Sahara Reporters, Naija News, Ripples Nigeria, and Premium Times. These platforms have gained prominence for their investigative journalism and ability to publish stories quickly, particularly on sensitive issues that traditional media may avoid.

== List of newspapers ==
This is a list of newspapers in Nigeria. The list includes print and online newspapers currently published in Nigeria that have national circulation or that are major local newspapers.

Newspaper	Location	First issues	Publisher
News Agency of Nigeria	Abuja	1978	Ali Mohammed Ali (2023–present)
News9ja	Lagos	2012	News9ja Global Limited
Naija News	Lagos	2016	Polance Media Limited
NewsOnline	Lagos	2020	Winner's Media Concept
TheNiche	Lagos	2014	Acclaim Communications Limited
Newswatch	Lagos	1985	Global Media Mirror Limited
P.M. News	Lagos	1994	Independent Communications Network Limited
AkwaIbom Times	Uyo	2025	AkwaIbom Times Media and Communication Ltd
ThisDay	Lagos	1995	Leaders and Company
The Herald	Kwara	1973	Leaders and Company
Complete Sports	Lagos	1995	Sunny Obazu-Ojeagbase
Daily Trust	Abuja	1998	Media Trust Ltd
The Sun	Lagos	2001	The Sun Publishing Ltd
Independent Nigeria	Lagos	2001	Independent Newspaper Limited
National Network	Port Harcourt	2004	Network Printing and Publishing Company
Next	Lagos	2004	Timbuktu Media group
Leadership	Abuja	2004	Leadership Group Ltd
Business Day	Lagos	2005	Frank Aigbogun
Sahara Reporters	New York City	2006	Omoyele Sowore
National Mirror		2006	Global Media Mirror Limited
The Whistler	Abuja	2014	The Whistler Communications Limited
The Nation	Lagos	2006	Vintage Press Limited
Uhuru Times	Ogun	2007	Journal Communication Limited
Peoples Daily	Abuja	2008	Peoples Media Ltd
Newsdiary online	Abuja	2009	NewsDiary Communication Limited
Netng	Lagos	2009	Adekunle Ayeni
West Africa News Agency	Abuja	2024	West Africa News Agency LTD
TheCable	Lagos	2011	Cable Newspaper Ltd.
Premium Times	Abuja	2011	Premium Times Services Limited
Blueprint	Abuja	2011	Mohammed Idris
Daylight	Lagos	2014	Azuh Amatus
New Telegraph	Lagos	2014	The Telegraph Publishing Company
The Authority	Abuja	2015	The Authority Media & Publications Limited
Prime 9ja Online	Edo	2016	Prime 9ja Online Media
Ripples Nigeria	Lagos	2015	Richmond Hill Media Limited
Stears Business	Lagos	2015	Stears News Limited
Politics Nigeria	Lagos	2016	Dumebi Emmanuel
Daily Nigerian	Abuja	2016	Penlight Media Limited
Daily Champion	Lagos	2011	Emmanuel Iwuanyanwu
Daily Post	Lagos	2011	Daily Post Media Limited
Nigeria CommunicationsWeek	Lagos	2007	Ken Nwogbo
Nigerian Compass	Ogun State	2008	Gbenga Daniel
Urhobo Vanguard	Delta State	2012	Urhobo Vanguard Publishing Ltd
Thinkers Newspaper	Abuja	2015	Thinkers Communications Limited
Stears Business	Lagos	2015	Stears News Limited
Vanguard	Lagos	1983	Vanguard Media Limited
The Punch	Lagos	1971	Wale Aboderin
The Guardian	Lagos	1983	Guardian Newspapers Limited
Nigerian Tribune	Ibadan	1949	African Newspapers of Nigeria Ltd
Peoples Gazette	Abuja	2020	Peoples Gazette Limited
The Will	Lagos	2009	Austyn Ogannah
Triumph	Kano	1980	Triumph Publishing Company Limited
Nigerian Observer	Benin City	1968	Bendel Newspapers Company Limited
The Tide	Port Harcourt	1971	Rivers State Newspaper Corporation
Nigeria Standard	Jos	1972	Benue-Plateau Printing Publication Cooperation
Legit.ng	Lagos	2012	Naij.com Media Limited
Obaland	Edo	2009	Obaland Magazine and Multichoice Media House
Osun Defender	Osogbo	2006	Moremi Publishing House Limited
Lagos Daily News	Lagos	1925	Herbert Macaulay
Federal Character	Maryland	2019	Etcetera Ejikeme
Daily Intel Newspaper	Fct Abuja	2022	Tony Christian
Daily Times	Lagos	1925	Folio Communications
Alaroye	Lagos	1985	World Information Agents
Nigerian Daily Sketch	Ibadan	1964	Spark Communications Limited
Tmy News (online newspaper)	Lagos	2013	Tmy Empire
The Informant247	Ilorin	2017	The Informant247 Limited
Nairametrics	Lagos	2015	Obi-Chukwu Ugodre
Justice Watch Magazine	Abuja	2002	Geoffrey Uwadiegwu Oputa

== See also ==
- Brown envelope journalism
- Elite advertisement in Nigeria
- List of radio stations in Nigeria
- List of television stations in Nigeria
- Media of Nigeria
- Telecommunications in Nigeria
- Actual list of newspapers in Nigeria
