= Brown envelope journalism =

Bribed journalism practice

In media ethics, brown envelope journalism (BEJ), or simply envelope journalism, is the practice of journalists accepting monetary or other incentives in exchange for favourable news coverage or the suppression of negative information. The name is derived from cash inducements hidden in brown envelopes and given to journalists during press briefings.

The phenomenon undermines journalistic integrity and media independence, and leads to biased reporting influenced by external interests. The practice has been observed in Tanzania, Nigeria, and in Ghana where it is called soli and in Cameroon where it is known as gombo, and is also reported in Gulf countries including Kuwait.

BEJ is often justified by journalists due to low salaries and inadequate compensation for work-related expenses.

== By country or region ==
=== Asia ===
Envelope journalism (also envelopmental journalism, red envelope journalism, white envelope journalism, Ch'ongi, wartawan amplop) is a colloquial term for the practice of bribing corrupt journalists for favorable media coverage. While the term brown envelope journalism is common in English-speaking countries and African countries, other envelope colors are more commonly used in Asia, the Philippines, China, Korea, India, and Indonesia.

The term arose from the envelopes used to hold cash bribes, given ostensibly as tokens of appreciation for attending a press conference.

More recently, the term ATM journalism has arisen, to indicate the change to electronic transfer of bribes to journalists' bank accounts.

=== Congo ===
In the Republic of the Congo, it is just known as envelope journalism.

=== Nigeria ===
Brown envelope journalism is regarded as a common practice in Nigeria. Prior to the 1990s, most news publications were government owned. The Babangida regime (1985–1993) saw a rise of media activism, opposing militarised democratization and struggle for independence. One of the effects is that the Nigerian media has become a thriving arena for sponsored stories. Some journalists in Nigeria consider brown envelope journalism to be unethical, and media regulatory bodies such as the Nigeria Union of Journalists apply a code of ethics to discourage this practice.

=== Tanzania ===
In Tanzania, a significant proportion of journalists work on a freelance basis, earning less than the national average salary and making them more vulnerable to such unethical practices. Payments are sometimes disguised as allowances for attending events with the expectation of positive coverage. The studies conducted in Tanzania, indicate a considerable incidence of journalists admitting to accepting such bribes.

=== Kuwait ===
Brown envelope journalism is prevalent in Kuwait. A 2021study examined the practice of brown envelope journalism in Kuwait. The study revealed that the situation in Kuwait has largely remained unchanged. The conceptualization of ethics among journalists in Kuwait has shown little evolution over the years. The journalists continue to face the same ethical dilemmas, indicating a persistent challenge in adhering to journalistic integrity. Additionally, the employment of part-time journalists, who may be more susceptible to engaging in brown envelope journalism due to financial pressures, is still a prevalent practice in the country. This highlights a systemic issue within the media industry in Kuwait, where part-time journalists are potentially more exposed to ethical compromises.

The study also found a lack of proactive measures by editors and media supervisors in Kuwait to combat this form of journalism. There is an absence of strict policies or disciplinary actions against reporters who engage in such practices. This lack of enforcement contributes to the ongoing presence of brown envelope journalism in the Kuwaiti media landscape. Moreover, many journalists in Kuwait view the acceptance or rejection of these unethical incentives as a personal choice, rather than a professional ethical breach. This perspective underscores a broader issue of individual responsibility versus institutional accountability in the field of journalism in Kuwait.

== Forms ==
Brown envelope journalism is sometimes described by practitioners in Nigeria as public relations, which involves paying in advance for news coverage. Journalists may be given monetary inducements in exchange for undue favor under the guise that the benefactors appreciate the time and mileage they spent to cover stories. The practice of offering bribes to unethical journalists is referred to as kola.

== Causes ==
Brown envelope journalism may be the result of the poor remuneration of journalists. Many journalists' salaries are not paid on time, and bosses sometimes justify this non-payment by telling their employees to use the media platform to earn money. There are instances where magazines owe employees six months' salary; even when paid, many journalists still earn less than $3 per day, and graduate journalists earn as little as $200 monthly. It may be difficult for journalists to live on their salaries alone without takeing brown envelopes. In 2015, the Nigeria Union of Journalists demonstrated against This Day newspapers after salary payments were delayed for nine months. A 2013 survey study of journalists' perception on the causes of Brown Envelope Syndrome (BES) practices in Nigeria indicate that 6% of journalists interview associate poor remuneration as a cause of BES, while 2% indicated delays in salary payments.

Another cause may be the influence of advertisers on the financial performance of media houses. Due to the revenues accrued by media firms through advertisements, the media houses consider the interests of advertisers in the presentation of sensitive news. Dele Olojede's Next newspapers stopped printing because of a drop in revenues from advertisers. Next's crusading stance on political issues and probe into the oil sector hurt its ad sales and paid salutatory praises on politicians. In some broadcast television stations, sponsored news programs can reach close to 50% of news stories.

== Criticism ==
BEJ is universally condemned by media ethicists and watchdog organizations despite its widespread nature. Critics argue that BEJ undermines journalistic integrity and the independence of the media. Despite these criticisms, the practice persists, influenced by broader economic and societal factors.

== See also ==
- Fake news
- Journalism ethics and standards
- Journalistic scandal
- Media bias
- Next (Nigeria)
- Payola
