= EdoMan =

Nigerian singer-songwriter and record executive

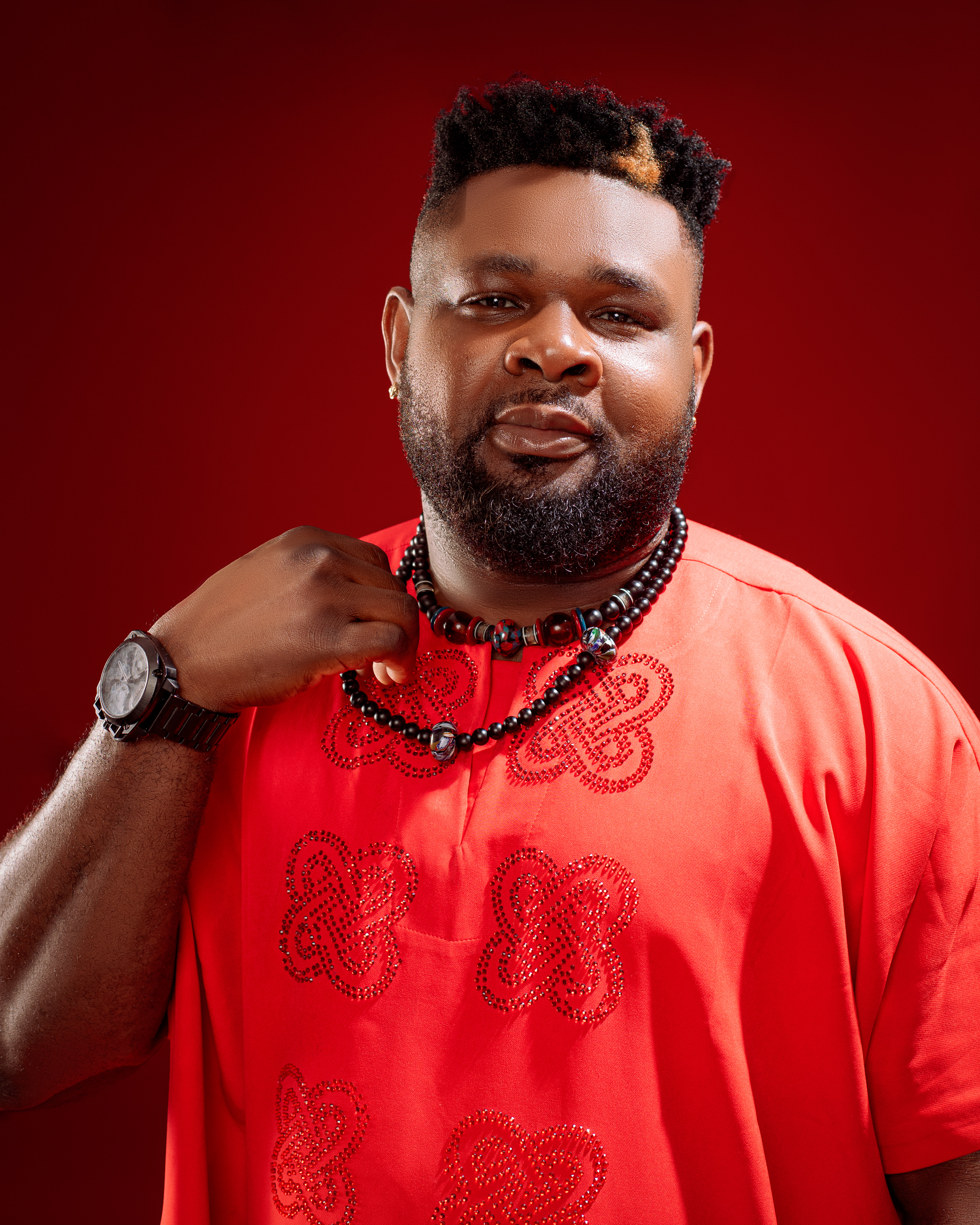

Background information
- Also known as: Gmoney Imadiyi
- Born: George Imadiyi Benin City, Edo State, Nigeria
- Genres: Afrobeats; Afropop
- Occupations: Record producer; record executive; singer-songwriter
- Years active: 2018–present
- Label: Keymaker Records

George Imadiyi known professionally as EdoMan formerly Gmoney Imadiyi, is a Nigerian singer-songwriter and record executive.

== Early life and education ==
EdoMan was born in Benin City, Edo State. He graduated from Ambrose Alli University in 2008 with a bachelor's degree in Mechanical Engineering and after serving in his National Youth Service Corps, moved to Europe in 2009.

== Career ==
In 2019, EdoMan released his debut album Born a Winner which featured singles such as "Igho", "Set me free" and "Shake am" which were released the previous year. The album was praised for his "unique blend of melodic ingenuity and thought-provoking lyrics". This was followed by Edo to the World which was lauded by Bioluwatife Akinyemi of Nigerian Tribune as "a cultural phenomenon that showcases the nature of Edo State through captivating melodies and insightful lyrics". In 2018, Gmoney Imadiyi founded Keymaker Records, a record label.
