= Mass media in Nigeria =

Mass media in Nigeria has an interesting and long history.

== Media culture ==
Historically, Nigeria has boasted the most free and outspoken press of any African country, but also one which has consistently been the target of harassment by the past military dictatorships. Many agents of Nigeria press have been imprisoned, exiled, tortured, or murdered as a result, among them being Ogoni activist and television producer Ken Saro-Wiwa, who was executed for treason by order of the Sani Abacha dictatorship in 1995 (resulting in the expulsion of Nigeria from the Commonwealth of Nations and sanctions from abroad).

Even under the somewhat less-oppressive current civilian government, journalists have continued to come under fire, be it from the government (as with the June 2006 arrest of Gbenga Aruleba and Rotimi Durojaiye of African Independent Television under charges of sedition) or from other popular establishments (such as the self-imposed exile of this day's Isioma Daniel following the riots in Northern Nigeria over "sensitive comments" which she had made in an article regarding Muhammad and the 2002 Miss World pageant.

A fatwa calling for her beheading was issued by the mullahs of northern Nigeria, but was declared null and void by the relevant religious authorities in Saudi Arabia, and the Obasanjo faced an international public relations smearing (especially within journalistic circles) in the aftermath, which was not helped by the Amina Lawal controversy which had occurred prior to the riots, which had seen over 200 dead). However, as with most other countries, blogging has increasingly become a much safer, and much easier, conduit for Nigeria's growing Internet-enabled minority to express their dissatisfactions with the current state of affairs in Nigeria.

=== Media corruption ===
Brown envelope journalism in Nigeria is a practice whereby monetary inducement is given to journalists to make them write a positive story or kill a negative story. The name is derived from cash inducements hidden in brown envelopes and given to journalists during press briefings. It is a common practice in Nigeria and many journalists do know that it is unethical. One of the effects is that the Nigerian media has become a hotbed for sponsored stories.

== Mediums ==
=== Newspapers ===
Until the 1990s most publications were government-owned, but private papers such as the Nigerian Tribune, The Punch, Vanguard, and the Guardian continued to expose public and private scandals. Laws related to the media, including newspapers, are scattered across various pieces of legislature. There are few good sources of discussion and analysis of these laws.

An analysis of newspapers shows a strong bias towards coverage of males, reflecting prevalent cultural biases. Few articles discuss women and there are few photographs of women outside the fashion sections. Although earnings have declined since the late 1980s the number of publications has steadily grown. As of 2008 there were over 100 national, regional or local newspapers.

=== Radio and television ===
While newspapers (and, most recently, blogging) have long thrived in Nigeria, radio and television has not received as much recognition, due to limited resources and press restrictions which beset the establishment of radio or television services in Nigeria. However, such limitations have since been improved in order to reach larger audiences both within and without Nigeria, such as with the growth of satellite television. The BBC World Service as well as the Voice of America and the German broadcasting organization Deutsche Welle (DW) also provide shortwave radio in the Hausa language. Furthermore, advent of Online Media challenged Old Media existence. Online Media Practitioners Association of Nigeria (OMPAN) were also another set of people to revolutionarize media in Nigeria.

=== Most viewed channels ===
Position	Channel	Share of total viewing (%)
1	AM Family	10.4
2	AIT	6.5
3	AM Showcase	6.0
4	Silverbird TV	5.4
5	TVC Entertainment	5.0
6	M-Net	4.9
7	Galaxy TV	3.3
8	AM Yoruba	1.9
9	WAP TV	1.4
10	KAFTAN TV	1.0

=== Internet sites ===
Virtually all Nigerian newspapers have an internet presence; in addition, there are several websites which are dedicated to allowing Nigerians to air their opinions on a variety of topics.

== See also ==
- Elite advertisement in Nigeria
- List of Nigerian newspapers
- Telecommunications in Nigeria
- Cinema of Nigeria

== Sources ==
- Mwalimu, Charles (2005). The Nigerian legal system. Peter Lang. ISBN 0-8204-7126-7.
- Poindexter, Paula Maurie; Meraz, Sharon (2008). Women, men, and news: divided and disconnected in the news media landscape. Taylor & Francis. ISBN 978-0-8058-6102-0.
- Sriramesh, Krishnamurthy; Verčič, Dejan (2009). The global public relations handbook: theory, research, and practice. Taylor & Francis. ISBN 978-0-415-99514-6.

== Bibliography ==
- Segun Oduko (1987). "From Indigenous Communication to Modern Television: A Reflection of political Development in Nigeria". Africa Media Review. 1 (3). Archived from the original on 21 November 2020 – via Michigan State University Libraries, African e-Journals Project.
- Olumuyiwa Ayodele (1988). "Objectivity, Sycophancy and the Media Reality in Nigeria". Africa Media Review. 3 (1). Archived from the original on 21 November 2020 – via Michigan State University Libraries, African e-Journals Project.
- Philip G. Altbach; Edith S. Hoshino, eds. (1995). "Nigeria". International Book Publishing: An Encyclopedia. Garland. ISBN 9781134261260.
- "Nigeria: Directory: Broadcasting and Communications". Africa South of the Sahara 2003. Regional Surveys of the World. Europa Publications. 2003. p. 804. ISSN 0065-3896.
- Jonathon Green; Nicholas J. Karolides (2005). "Nigeria". Encyclopedia of Censorship. Facts on File, Inc. ISBN 978-1-4381-1001-1.
- Toyin Falola; Ann Genova (2009). Historical Dictionary of Nigeria. Scarecrow Press. ISBN 978-0-8108-6316-3. (Includes information about newspapers, radio, TV, etc.)
- "Nigeria", Freedom of the Press, USA: Freedom House, 2016, OCLC 57509361
