= Reuben Muoka =

Nigeria Journalist

Reuben Muoka is a former Communication Editor of Vanguard Newspaper, an ex-deputy general manager of Nigeria First Mobile Telephone Operator (MTS First Wireless) and currently the director of public affairs of Nigerian Communications Commission.

== Education ==
Muoka obtained his first degree in Performing Arts from University of Ilorin. He moved to University of Lagos for his master's degree in Mass Communication where he specialises in Public Relations and Advertising.

== Career in NCC ==
Muoka became part of the Nigerian Communication Commission in 2007 as a Principal Manager and was assigned to a Public Affairs Department where he was the head of Media and Public Relations Unit. In 2010, he became as assistant director and in 2015, he became a deputy director assigned to head the re-engineered Public Relations Unit of PAD. In 2017, he was moved to the department of Policy, Competition and Economic Analysis in order to head the Economic Analysis unit of department. In 2021, he was appointed as the head of the Special Duties Department, which includes the International Relations Unit; Emergency Communication Centres Unit; the Public-Private Partnership Unit; and the Security Services Unit of the commission.

== Memberships ==
Muoka is a member of the following communication bodies; Nigeria Union of Journalists, Nigeria Institute of Public Relations and Associate Member of the Registered Practitioners of Advertising.
