= Business Day =

Business Day may refer to:

- Business day, a period of the week
- BusinessDay, a website of Fairfax Media (Australia, New Zealand)
- Business Day (Nigeria), a business/finance newspaper
- Business Day (South Africa), a business/finance newspaper
- BusinessWorld, a Filipino newspaper originally published as Business Day
