= Philip Begho =

Nigerian writer

- Born: 11 January 1956 (age 70)
- Citizenship: Nigeria
- Occupations: Writer, Lawyer, Songwriter, Children's writer, Screenwriter

Philip Begho (born 11 January 1956) is a Nigerian writer (dramatist, children's writer, novelist, short story writer, and poet), the author of more than forty books. Born in Warri, Delta State, of an Itsekiri father and a mother of mixed race, he received his secondary school education at King's College, Lagos, and obtained an LLB. from the University of Lagos and an LL.M. from the University of London (London School of Economics). Though he currently works as a full-time writer, he has worked as a journalist, a banker, a businessman, a legal practitioner and a university lecturer. He has also engaged in film and theatrical production. His dramatic writing cuts across film, television, radio and the stage, and several of his stage plays have won awards. He also writes songs and non-fiction works, and his law book Company Formation: Precedents on Objects of Incorporation has gone into several editions.

== Biography ==
=== Early life ===
Part of Philip Begho's elementary education was received at Grange School, Ikeja, Lagos, but when his father, who had been a chief magistrate at Ikeja, was transferred to Benin City and subsequently appointed a judge in the newly created Mid-Western Region, he continued his elementary education there at Emotan Private School. In 1967 he was admitted to King's College, Lagos and began writing at the age of eleven for the two school publications – The Searchlight and The Mermaid.

He was highly adventurous during his middle-school years, and at the age of thirteen he got lost while exploring a path in the bush and claimed to have seen very strange things, which might have contributed to the cast of mind that spawned his children fantasies in later years. He represented his school and Lagos State in athletic competitions, excelling in the high jump and pole vault events, and was appointed vice-school captain in his final year.

Finishing school, he worked as a reporter for the Nigerian Observer before commencing undergraduate studies in law in 1974 at the University of Lagos. In 1975 he won a scholarship for academic performance and was on the Dean's List in 1976, before graduating with honours in 1977. He was admitted to the Nigerian Law School in Lagos and was called to the bar in 1978.

=== Early career ===
A few months after his call to the bar in 1978, Philip Begho was drafted into the National Youth Service Corps and posted to Jos in Plateau State, where his primary assignment was as a researcher in the Police Staff College at Bukuru. During the one-year programme, he started to have serious doubts about pursuing a career in a profession he was beginning to find creatively restrictive. But if not law, what?

His dilemma grew, and he decided to write a poem about it. As he finished and held the poem in his hand, it struck him that he was holding the "what?" Of course you couldn't make a career of poetry, not unless you were a known master lyricist, but you could make one of creative writing as a novelist, so a novelist he decided to be.

But the imperatives of earning a living meant he first had to take up a job, so when in 1979 he was invited to join the law firm of a former lecturer of his, he readily agreed. While working there, he moonlighted as a businessman in the hope that he would make enough money to obtain the freedom to do what he really desired. But not finding such good fortune, he accepted a place in 1980 to study at the London School of Economics, University of London, for an LL.M.

He had worked only a year at the law firm in Lagos, but his time there was so successful that he received an offer to return to the firm as a junior partner. But when he received his master's degree in 1981, he took up a job with Citibank N.A. and was sent to Glyfada, Greece as a trainee manager. The job was very lucrative, but the time to write a novel, which he hadn't found at LSE, he still couldn't find at Citibank. Nor did he find it when he returned to Nigeria in 1982 and assumed a lectureship at the University of Benin.

In 1983 he quit the teaching appointment and, living on saved funds, he began to write. He completed three novels before his money ran out, and two of them – Alero: of Dreams... and The Lecturer’s Dilemma – were accepted for publication by African Universities Press. But they never got published and the reason given was that the startling berserk trend the economy had taken couldn't sustain books other than text books.

Out of funds, he thought it prudent to return to law, and so to Lagos he went to set up his own law firm. He practised law from 1984 until he relocated temporarily in 1987 to the UK But before he left he had written and published the first edition of Company Formation: Precedents on Objects of Incorporation. This was in 1986.

=== Writing career ===
From the moment he set foot in London in July 1987, the lawyer in Philip Begho disappeared. In its place was a new person, one who saw that if the dream of writing, which had died in many, was not to die in him, he would have to sacrifice his academic and professional qualifications and sustain himself doing menial jobs that would free him to write. So, engaging in cleaning jobs that lasted only a few hours in the evenings, he toiled away in the afternoons in libraries, training for a writing career.

Late in 1988, not having been able to write a play before, he was moved to begin the play Esther. The research and plotting took him two years, and it was not until the beginning of 1991 that he was ready to start the dialogue. The ability to write in verse, long desired, miraculously came upon him he claims, and he was able to write the dialogue in verse that has been described as sure-footed and graceful in tone. Esther was completed in December 1991 and by 15 March 1992 Philip Begho had returned to Nigeria.

Riding the tiger-back of the power outages and social unrest that characterised Lagos in 1993, he started and completed Daniel, another verse play. Esther and Daniel were entered in manuscript form for the coveted Association of Nigerian Authors (ANA) Drama Prize in 1994, and Esther won while Daniel came second. But it was Daniel, rather than Esther, which was first produced, being replete with themes that gave voice to the people's struggle in the Abacha years. It was staged to critical acclaim at the University of Lagos and at Nigeria's prestigious MUSON Centre in December 1994.

The cast featured such leading lights of the Nigerian stage as Joke Silva, Ayo Lijadu and Ihria Enakimio, and since then there have been several re-runs. Daniel (aka Power of Lions) was published in 2001 and Esther followed in 2002. Also published in 2002 was Philip Begho's third play, Job's Wife, another verse play. Job's Wife won the 2002 Association of Nigerian Authors (ANA) Drama Prize.

But Philip Begho does not only write stage plays. He has written for television, radio and film, and is writing more novels these days. His novel Songbird worn the 2003 Isidore Okpewho Prose Prize and was short-listed for the 2004 Nigeria Prize for Literature. His children's book Aunty Felicia won the 2003 ANA/Matatu Prize for Children's Literature, while Aunty Felicia Returns won the 2005 ANA/Atiku Abubakar Children's Literature Prize.

=== Themes and style ===
Philip Begho's awareness of the profound influence the literary and dramatic arts have in shaping societal values is evident in his work, and his fiction, whether for adults or for children, is thematically preoccupied with such virtues as truth, righteousness and justice and their place in combating societal ills. One critic has in fact gone as far as saying that he uses creative literature to bring people closer to God.

As for style, Philip Begho, embraces drama and mixes prose with poetry.

=== Life outside writing ===
Philip Begho is an Evangelical Christian who claims to have had an encounter with Christ Jesus that turned his life around in 1986. He is quick to attribute the direction of his work and its volume to divine guidance and help. When not writing he engages in Christian counselling and career coaching and makes time to run play-and-learn groups for children. He enjoys the theatre, movies, music, dancing, walking, tennis, badminton and swimming.

== Bibliography ==
=== Drama ===
1. Daniel (aka Power of Lions; Lagos: Monarch Books, 2001)
2. Esther (Lagos: Monarch Books, 2002)
3. Job's Wife (Lagos: Monarch Books, 2002)
4. Titi Rella (Lagos: Monarch Books, 2004)
5. Jephthah’s Daughter (Lagos: Monarch Books, 2006)
6. Leopard Woman (Lagos: Monarch Books, 2010)
7. Traffic Jam Kids (Lagos: Monarch Books, 2010)
8. Solomon (Lagos: Monarch Books, 2010)
9. Joseph (Lagos: Monarch Books, 2010)
10. Nebuchadnezzar (Lagos: Monarch Books, 2010)
11. Jael (Lagos: Monarch Books, 2010)
12. Born King (Lagos: Monarch Books, 2010)
13. Predator (Lagos: Monarch Books, 2010)
14. Smallie (Lagos: Monarch Books, 2010)
15. Smallie 2: When Should I Marry? (Lagos: Monarch Books, 2010)
16. Smallie 3: The Rubbishians (Lagos: Monarch Books, 2010)
17. Smallie 4: The Marriage Seminar (Lagos: Monarch Books, 2010)
18. Smallie 5: The Beggar (Lagos: Monarch Books, 2010)
19. Smallie 6: The Sandwich (Lagos: Monarch Books, 2010)
20. Smallie 7: Five Storybooks (Lagos: Monarch Books, 2010)
21. Smallie 8: Two-Way Street (Lagos: Monarch Books, 2010)
22. Smallie 9: World Peace Day (Lagos: Monarch Books, 2010)
23. Smallie 10: School Daze (Lagos: Monarch Books, 2010)
24. Smallie 11: The NEPA Statue (Lagos: Monarch Books, 2010)
25. Smallie 12: True Democracy (Lagos: Monarch Books, 2010)

=== Prose ===
1. Songbird (Lagos: Monarch Books, 2002)
2. Strange World (A collection of short stories; Lagos: Monarch Books, 2004)
3. Jelly Baby (Lagos: Monarch Books, 2004)
4. Aunty Felicia (Lagos: Monarch Books, 2003)
5. Aunty Felicia Returns (Lagos: Monarch Books, 2005)
6. Aunty Felicia Goes to Yankari (Lagos: Monarch Books, 2010)
7. Aunty Felicia Goes to School (Lagos: Monarch Books, 2010)
8. Aunty Felicia in the Evil Forest (Lagos: Monarch Books, 2010)
9. Aunty Felicia Goes to Church (Lagos: Monarch Books, 2010)
10. King Omatosan (Lagos: Monarch Books, 2010)
11. Chuma the Terror (Lagos: Monarch Books, 2010)
12. Crab Story (Lagos: Monarch Books, 2010)

=== Poetry ===
- Tulip of the Nile (Lagos: Monarch Books, 2003)

=== Non-fiction ===
1. Company Formation: Precedents on Objects of Incorporation (1986; Lagos: Monarch Books, 1993, 2003, 2009)
2. Tongues Aflame (Lagos: Monarch Books, 2003)

== Awards and prizes ==
1. Association of Nigerian Authors (ANA) Drama Prize 1994
2. Lire en Fête Short Story 1st Prize 2001
3. ANA/NDDC JP Clark-Bekederemo Prize for Drama 2002
4. ANA/Matatu Prize for Children's Literature 2003
5. Isidore Okpewho Prose Prize 2003
6. ANA/Atiku Abubakar Prize for Children's Literature 2005

== See also ==
- List of African writers
- List of African poets
