= Global Information Network (disambiguation) =

Global Information Network could refer to:

- Global Information Network, a non-profit news agency with a focus on Africa
- Global Information Network Architecture
- A multi-level marketing scheme run by Kevin Trudeau
