= Sahara Reporters =

Nigerian News Website

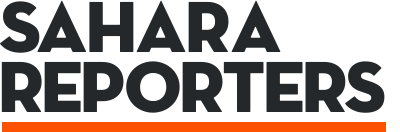
- Company type: News media
- Founded: 2006
- Founder: Omoyele Sowore
- Owners: Omoyele Sowore
- Website: saharareporters.com

Sahara Reporters is a news website based in New York City that focuses on promoting citizen journalism by encouraging everyday people to report stories about corruption, human rights abuses and other political misconduct in Africa, with special focus on Nigeria. Sahara Reporters specializes in exposing corruption and government malfeasance.

== History ==
The old Sahara Reporters logo

Based in New York City, Sahara Reporters was founded in 2006 by Omoyele Sowore. It employs staff members in Nigeria and the United States. The site's publication of leaked, often unfiltered information has disrupted Nigeria's traditional media scene.

By basing his operation in New York, Sowore for years had a degree of protection from the consequences of publishing often scandalous information about Nigeria's most powerful people. He shuttled between his family home in New Jersey and Nigeria, where he is a citizen, without much interference.

After launching an open presence in Lagos, Nigeria, in 2017, Sahara Reporters has come under a series of attacks, as reported by the Committee to Protect Journalists (CPJ), among others. On December 10, 2019, Sahara Reporters staff told CPJ that their Nigerian bank account was frozen without advance notice in October. Their website was separately disabled twice due to allegations of copyright infringement, and staff report cyberattacks and increased surveillance outside their Lagos office, according to Sahara Reporters staff who spoke to CPJ.

"Sahara Reporters must be permitted to keep the Nigerian public informed without intimidation", said Angela Quintal, CPJ's Africa program coordinator. "Surveillance, cyberattacks, and copyright notices against Sahara Reporters mark a concerning pattern of interference and harassment of an investigative news outlet."

In December 2009, Sahara Reporters drew worldwide attention by being the first news source to identify and publish the photo of Umar Farouk Abdulmutallab, known more commonly as the "underwear bomber", who is a suspected terrorist accused of attempting to blow-up Northwest Airlines Flight 253 on Christmas Day by detonating a plastic bomb that exploded in his underwear.

Sahara Reporters has gained a large following both in Nigeria and amongst Nigerians abroad, and reaches over fifteen million people across its social media platforms. Although Sahara Reporters reports from New York are protected by the First Amendment, both Sowore and the organization have received threats from individuals whose illegal activities have been exposed on the Sahara Reporters website, as well as the Nigerian government.

== Funding ==
Sahara Reporters reaches a global audience, with sizable diaspora reach. It is supported through online advertisements, direct advertising and multinational campaigns.

Sahara Reporters was traditionally supported by grants donated by international foundations and non-governmental organizations. It has received support from the Ford Foundation, which donated $175,000 to the organization in the past, and from the Global Information Network. Sahara Reporters has also received a $450,000 grant from the Omidyar Foundation.

Sahara Reporters Media Foundation was awarded $1,300,000 between 2016 and 2019 by MacArthur Foundation.

Since 2006, Sahara Reporters has published over 5,000 reports.

== Recent events ==
The founder and former publisher of Sahara Reporters, Omoyele Sowore was detained by the Nigerian government led by President Muhammadu Buhari ostensibly for planning a mass demonstration against the ills of the government. The demonstration was characterized by the Nigerian government as an attempt to overthrow it, which was denounced by the Robert F. Kennedy Human Rights commission, along with many international bodies.

Department of State Services (DSS) agents arrested Sahara Reporters founder Omoyele Sowore on August 3, 2019. He was charged with treason, cybercrime, and money laundering, including for transfers allegedly made to Sahara Reporters' Nigerian bank account, according to a U.S.-based legal team's submission to the U.N. working group on arbitrary detention. Sowore has been jailed ever since, aside from one overnight release on bail in early December, according to La Keisha Landrum Pierre and media reports.

CPJ has documented Nigerian security forces repeatedly attacking journalists, including those reporting on the August demonstrations or related protests against Sowore's detention. Following the reelection of President Muhammadu Buhari in February, journalists told CPJ they worried that his government would feel less restrained in curbing press freedom.

According to Robert F. Kennedy Human Rights, "Over the course of the last 5 months, the Nigerian authorities have subjected journalist and human rights defender, Omoyele Sowore, to unlawful arrests, arbitrary detention and malicious prosecution due to his attempts to exercise his fundamental rights to freedom of expression and freedom of peaceful assembly. The Nigerian authorities, in particular the DSS, have repeatedly violated Mr. Sowore's due process rights and have proceeded to charge him with a number of serious crimes, including cyberstalking, treason and money laundering -- none of which have any basis in law or in fact. As a result, Mr. Sowore is now threatened with a sentence of life in prison. To date, the government has failed to produce a single shred of evidence of any wrongdoing for these extremely serious charges, instead the authorities solely rely on Mr. Sowore's lawful public statements and actions in their attempt to justify his prolonged arbitrary detention and specious prosecution." Mr. Sowore is set to stand trial for these baseless charges on February 11, 2020.

Sowore is a U.S. permanent resident and resides in Haworth, New Jersey, with his wife Opeyemi Sowore and two children who are all U.S. citizens.

== See also ==
- Corruption in Nigeria
- Media in Nigeria
