= Lagos: Supernatural City =

2022 book by Tim Cocks

- Author: Tim Cocks
- Language: English
- Published: April 2024
- Publisher: Hurst Publishers
- Publication place: United Kingdom
- Pages: 324
- ISBN: 9781911723257

Lagos: Supernatural City is a 2022 book by British author and journalist Tim Cocks.

== Reception ==
Athekame kenneth of BusinessDay praised the book's plot and characters, writing that "it is an immersive and thrilling journey....a testament to the power of storytelling, transporting readers to a world both familiar and fantastical".
