= Richard Akinnola =

Nigerian journalist and human rights activist

- Born: Akure, Ondo State
- Occupations: Nigerian journalist, author, lawyer, and activist.
- Notable work: He was the editor of the Vanguard Newspaper and is an executive director of the Centre for Free Speech organisation.He is a member of the Nigerian Union of Journalists and Civil Liberties Organisation.

Richard Akinnola is a Nigerian journalist, author, lawyer, and activist. He was the editor of the Vanguard Newspaper and is an executive director of the Centre for Free Speech organisation. He has contributed articles to media organisations and is the author of several books.

== Career ==
For many years, Akinnola covered the judicial beat and became the editor of the Vanguard Newspapers in Nigeria. He has researched and published several books on media, law, and national development. He is a member of the Nigerian Union of Journalists and Civil Liberties Organisation.

== Writings ==
=== Newspaper articles ===
- Did I betray Richard Akinnola?
- A Plea to the Protesters
- Oshiomhole's Deceptive Apology

=== Books ===
- Abiola, Democracy, and Rule of Law OCLC Number 41712844
- History of Coup D'etats in Nigeria OCLC Number 44812276
- Nigerian Media and Legal Constraints OCLC Number 48014783
