= Daily Intel Newspaper =

Nigerian online newspaper

- Type: Online newspaper
- Format: Digital
- Publisher: Tony Christian
- Founded: 2022
- Language: English
- Headquarters: Abuja, Nigeria
- Website: www.dailyintelnewspaper.com

Daily Intel Newspaper is a Nigerian online newspaper based in Abuja, Nigeria. Founded in 2022, the publication reports on Nigerian current affairs and publishes news, features and investigative reports.

== History ==
Daily Intel Newspaper was launched in Abuja as an online news platform by the publishers of SubNews Magazine. The launch was publicly announced in May 2024 at a press conference in Abuja. Leadership reported that the newspaper was introduced by the publishers of SubNews Magazine as part of an expansion into digital media.

The Sun Nigeria also reported the unveiling of Daily Intel Newspaper, stating that the publication would provide news updates on contemporary issues and cover areas including the economy, education, entertainment, health and sports.

The News Agency of Nigeria (NAN) also reported the launch of the newspaper in Abuja.

== Ownership and management ==
Tony Christian is identified by Nigerian media reports as the publisher of Daily Intel Newspaper. He is also associated with SubNews Magazine.

In February 2025, Vanguard reported that Christian alleged that he had been assaulted and unlawfully detained during an official engagement. His legal representatives subsequently sought an apology and compensation in connection with the incident.

== Editorial focus ==
Daily Intel Newspaper publishes reports on Nigerian politics, governance, public policy, economic and social issues, crime and other current affairs. The publication also produces investigative reports.

During its 2024 launch, the publication stated that its coverage would include the economy, education, entertainment, health, sports and other areas of national life.

== Recognition and awards ==
In 2025, Daily Intel Newspaper received the Investigative Magazine of the Year award at the National Union of Journalists (NUJ) Media Excellence Awards. The award recognised Daily Intel's investigative report titled Behind the Walls: Tracking Corruption in Nigeria’s Criminal Justice System—A Case Study of Kuje Medium Security Custodial Centre. The report examined alleged corruption and institutional problems at the Kuje Medium Security Custodial Centre.

== See also ==
- List of newspapers in Nigeria
- Mass media in Nigeria
- Journalism in Nigeria
