= Throwback =

Throwback may refer to:

- Atavism, or evolutionary throwback, a reversion to an ancestral type
- Throwback (drink), a 2009 brand of soft drink

== Arts and entertainment ==
- Throwback uniform, a sports uniform which mimics an older uniform of the team
- Throwback, a series of sculptures by American artist Tony Smith
  - Throwback (1/3)
  - Throwback (3/3)
- The Throwback (novel), a 1978 satirical novel written by Tom Sharpe
- Tecmo Bowl Throwback, a 2010 football video game

=== Film ===
- The Throwback (unfinished film), an unfinished 1920 film
- The Throwback (1935 film), an American Western
- Throwback (2014 film), an Australian action horror
- The Throwback (2023 film), an American comedy film

=== Music ===
- Throwback, Vol. 1, a 2004 album by Boyz II Men
- "Throwback" (song), by Usher, 2004
- "Throw Back", a song by Royce da 5'9" from Death Is Certain
- Throwbacks (album), a 2013 soundtrack album for The Naked Brothers Band
- Throwback R&B, a radio format

== Organizations ==
- Throwback players, a University of Melbourne theater club
- Chicago Throwbacks, a team of the Premier Basketball League
- Throwback Entertainment, a Canadian video game developer

== See also ==
- Throwback Thursday, a social media trend
- Retro style
- Retrospective
