= Telecommunications in Nigeria =

Nigeria is Africa's largest ICT market, accounting for 82% of the continent's telecoms subscribers and 29% of internet usage. Globally, Nigeria ranks 11th in the absolute number of internet users and 7th in the absolute number of mobile phones.

Economically, the ICT sector has contributed over 10% to Nigeria's gross national product for over 10 years.

Telecommunications in Nigeria include radio, television, fixed and mobile telephones, and the Internet.

== Radio and television ==
Nigeria's media scene is one of the most vibrant in Africa. Television and radio remain the most important medium of mass communication and information, with Social media rapidly emerging as the next big medium. International broadcasters, including the BBC, are popular.

There are nearly 70 federal government-controlled national and regional TV stations. All 36 states operate TV stations. Roughly 40 state government-owned radio stations typically carry their own programs except for news broadcasts.

Several private TV stations are operational. Cable and satellite TV subscription services are available. Nigeria has about 20 private radio stations; transmissions of international broadcasters are available. Digital broadcasting migration process has been completed in three states in 2018.

=== Government-owned stations ===
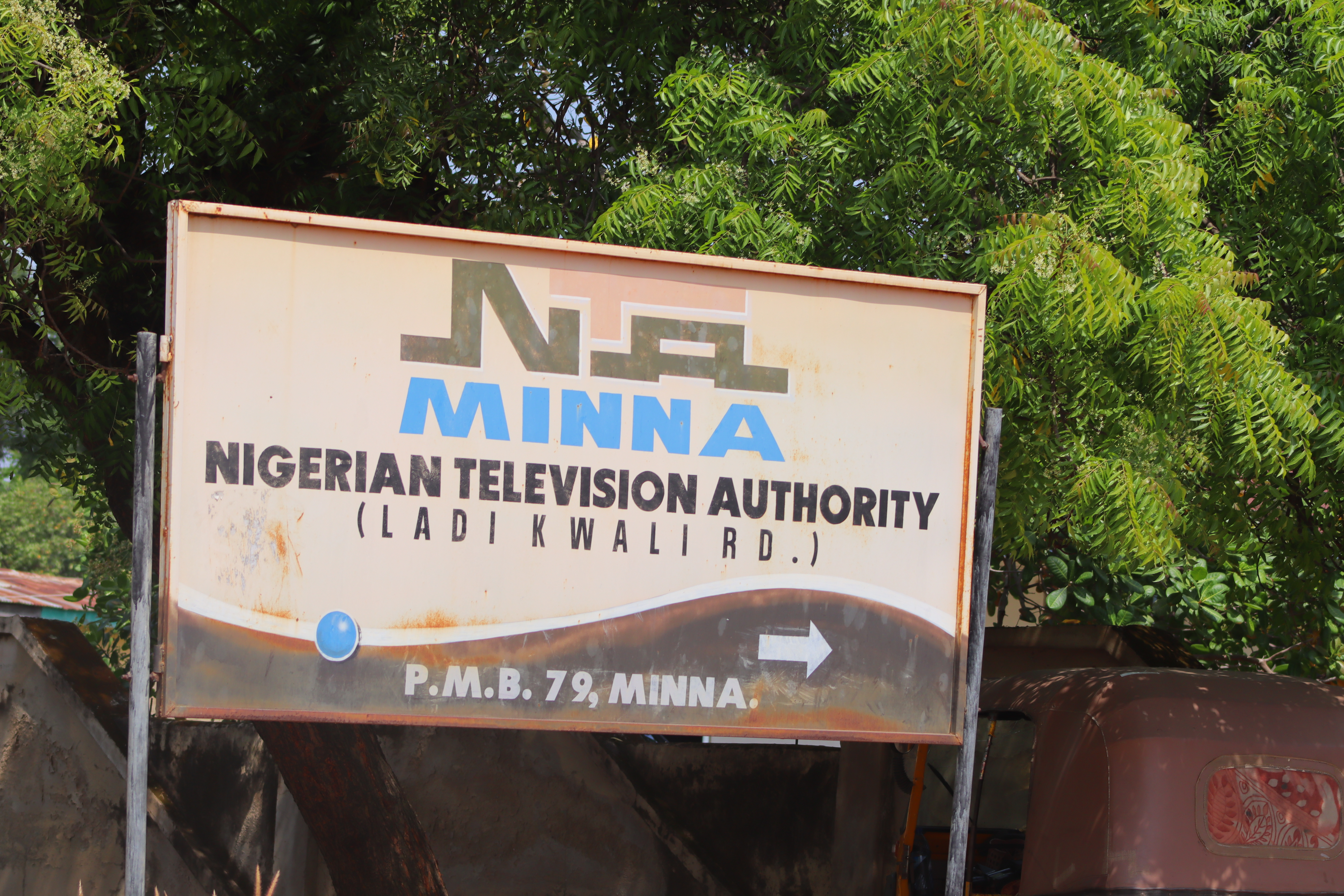
A signpost of Nigeria Television Authority in Minna

The largest broadcasting companies are the government-owned Federal Radio Corporation of Nigeria (FRCN) and the Nigerian Television Authority (NTA). The NTA has two television services, one is NTA 1, which is distributed among NTA's six television zones. The other is NTA 2, which is distributed nationwide and is funded mostly by advertising. NITEL owns a majority of the transmitters that broadcast FRCN and NTA programming.

Each state also has a broadcasting company that broadcasts one or two locally operated terrestrial stations. This means that there are about 50 government owned, but partly independent television stations.

=== Commercial stations ===
Private players in the Nigerian television scene include: Silverbird Television (STV), Africa Independent Television (AIT), Channels Television, Superscreen Television, and several others. Most of their programming is aimed for the African and global markets and is broadcast globally from Lagos, Abuja, and Port Harcourt centres with affiliated TV stations in other cities in Nigeria and several African countries. African Independent Television (AIT) is a high-profile satellite television station broadcasting globally from its Lagos and Abuja centres. Other direct satellite television stations with international reach operating in Nigeria are Murhi International Television, ON Television, Galaxy TV, TV Continental, etc. all in Lagos.

There is general access to cable television like GOtv, DSTV, HiTV, DaarSat, StarTimes and Infinity TV and other cable TVs in Nigeria.

=== Statistical data ===
Radio stations:

- network of federal government-owned national, regional, and state radio stations; roughly 40 state government-owned radio stations typically carry their own programs except for news broadcasts; about 20 private radio stations; transmissions of international broadcasters are available (2007);
- 83 AM, 36 FM, and 11 shortwave stations (2001).

Radios: 23.5 million (1997).

Television stations: nearly 70 federal government-owned national and regional TV stations; all 36 states operate TV stations; several private TV stations operational; cable and satellite TV subscription services are available (2007).

Television sets: 56.9 million (2007).

=== Media control and press freedom ===
Although the government censors the electronic media through the National Broadcasting Commission (NBC), which is responsible for monitoring and regulating broadcast media, there's no established proof towards Government's control of the media. Radio stations remain susceptible to attacks by political groups. For example, in January 2012 some media figures alleged the NBC warned radio stations not to broadcast stories about fuel subsidy protests.

Libel is a civil offense and requires defendants to prove the truth of opinion or value judgment contained in news reports or commentaries, or pay penalties. However, the media is allowed to broadcast "fair comment on matters of public interest". Penalties for defamation of character include two years' imprisonment and possible fines.

The law requires local television stations to limit programming from other countries to 40 percent and restricts foreign content of satellite broadcasting to 20 percent. The NBC's 2004 prohibition of live broadcasts of foreign news and programs remains in force, but does not apply to international cable or satellite services.

On numerous occasions in the past, especially, during military regime, security forces and police have arrested and detained journalists who criticized the government. Reporting on matters such as political corruption and security issues are particularly sensitive. Politicians and political parties harass journalists perceived as reporting on them or their interests in a negative manner. During local and state elections, journalists have been intimidated for covering certain election-related events. The militant group Boko Haram threatens media outlets and has killed members of the press. On 20 January 2012, unknown gunmen killed Channels TV reporter Enenche Akogwu while he was reporting on the Boko Haram attacks and bombings in Kano that day. Journalists practice self-censorship.

== Telephones ==
The number of fixed-line connections is insignificant and also in sharp decline (2016: 349,000, 2020: 107,000).

Mobile services, on the other hand, are growing rapidly, partly in response to fixed-line inadequacies; several mobile operators operate across the country, with subscribers at 92 per 100 people (2019). This ranks Nigeria 8th in the world.

Deregulation of the mobile phone market has led to the introduction of Global System for Mobile Communication (GSM) network providers operating on the 900/1800MHz spectrum, MTN Nigeria, Airtel Nigeria, Globacom, and 9mobile (Etisalat). Use of cell-phones has soared, and has mostly replaced the unreliable fixed line services of Nigerian Telecommunications Limited (NITEL).

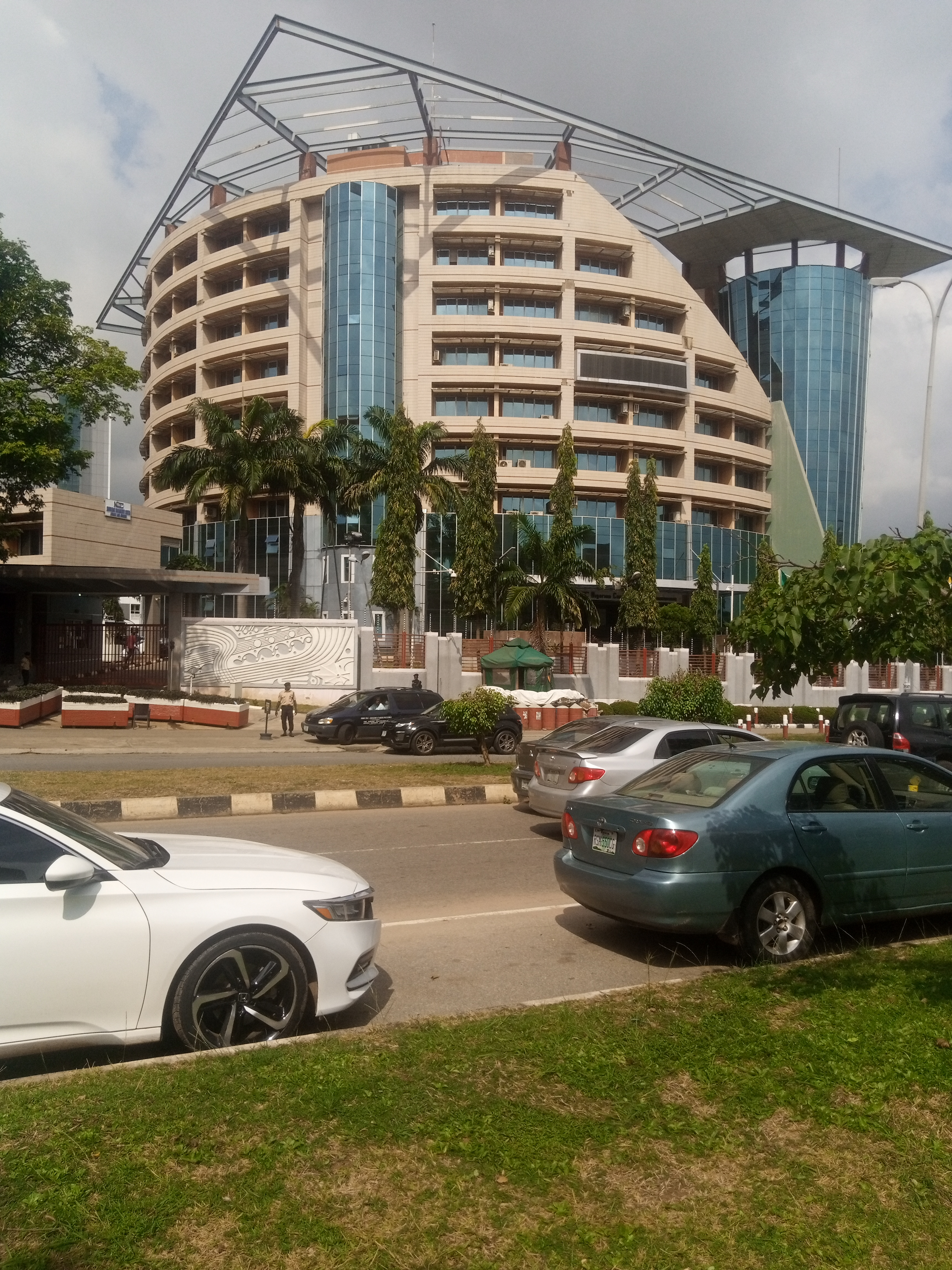
The Nigeria Communication Commission building in Abuja

With the expiration of the exclusivity period of the main GSM network providers, Nigeria's telecom regulator, the Nigerian Communications Commission (NCC), introduced the Unified Licensing Regime. It was hoped that telecoms with unified licences would be able to provide fixed and mobile telephony and Internet access as well as any other communications service they choose to offer. In March 2011 the NCC started registering SIM cards. The exercise was expected to last until 28 September 2011.

In 2015 the NTC fined MTN Nigeria a record $5.2 billion for issuing 5.2 million unregistered and pre-registered subscriber Identification Module Cards (SIMs). In 2017 the NTC sett up a 12-member task force in response to renewed proliferation of Unregistered and pre-registered SIM cards. The unregistered cards are considered a threat to Nigerian national security.

After a decade of failed privatization attempts, the incumbent national telecom NITEL and its mobile arm have been sold to NATCOM and now rebranded as Ntel.

Nigeria concluded its first 5G spectrum auction in 2021 and granted licences to two firms: MTN Nigeria and Mafab Communications. MTN Nigeria and Airtel Nigeria are the only mobile network operators that have launched 5G services in Nigeria. The companies have rolled out 5G in these 8 states - Lagos, Abuja, Port Harcourt, Ibadan, Ogun, Kano, Owerri, and Maiduguri, and plan to expand 5G coverage to other states in the future.

In Q1 2024, the telecommunications sector in Nigeria experienced a growth rate of 15.70%, up from 14.10% in Q4 2023. According to the National Bureau of Statistics (NBS), this growth was driven by increased mobile phone penetration, higher internet usage, and the rollout of 4G and 5G networks. The sector contributed 8.90% to Nigeria's GDP during this period.

=== Statistical data ===
Calling code: +234

International call prefix: 009

Connected lines:

- 348,933 fixed wired/wireless lines (July 2016).
- 222,440,207 mobile cellular (GSM) lines (July 2016).
- 3,611,926 mobile (CDMA) lines (July 2016).
- 226,426,215 total connected lines

Active lines:

- 164,114 fixed wired/wireless lines (July 2016).
- 149,708,077 Mobile cellular (GSM) lines (July 2016).
- 371,613 mobile (CDMA) lines (July 2016).
- 150,262,066 total active lines

Installed capacity:

- 11,384,677 fixed wired/wireless lines (June 2013).
- 204,242,114 mobile (GSM) lines (June 2013).
- 18,400,000 mobile (CDMA) lines (June 2013).
- 234,026,791 total lines

Teledensity:

- ~86 combined fixed and mobile lines per 100 persons (June 2013).
- ~1 fixed line per 100 persons (2010).
- ~60 mobile lines per 100 persons (2010).

Satellite earth stations: 3 Intelsat (2 Atlantic Ocean and 1 Indian Ocean) (2010);

Submarine cables:

- SAT-3/WASC/SAFE links countries along the west coast of Africa to each other and on to Europe and Asia,
- ACE links countries along the west coast of Africa to each other and on to France,
- GLO-1 links countries along the west coast of Africa to each other and on to the United Kingdom,
- Main One links countries along the west coast of Africa to each other and on to Portugal.

== Internet ==
Nigeria is one of the larger telecom markets in Africa subject to sporadic access to electricity. Most Internet connections are via mobile networks. The government is committed to expanding broadband penetration. The operators deploy fiber optic cable in six geopolitical zones and Lagos and invest in base stations to deplete network congestion.

A submarine cable break in 2020 slowed speeds and interrupted connectivity.

=== Statistical data ===
Top-level domain: .ng

Internet users:

- 129.0 Million Internet Users (Feb 2025)
- 159.0 Million Internet users (Jan 2024);
- 159.5 million users, 6th in the world (May 2023);
- 122 million users, 7th in the world (2019);
- 67.0 million users, 8th in the world (2015);
- 55.9 million users, 8th in the world; 32.9% of the population, 128th in the world (2012);
- 44.0 million users, 9th in the world (2009);
- 5.0 million users, 40th in the world (2005).

Fixed broadband: 15,311 subscriptions, 136th in the world; less than 0.05% of the population, 185th in the world (2012).

Wireless broadband: 17.3 million subscriptions, 18th in the world; 10.2% of the population, 91st in the world (2012).

Internet hosts:

- 1,234 hosts, 169th in the world (2012);
- 1,549 hosts, 134th in the world (2006).

IPv4: 1.0 million addresses allocated, 75th in the world, less than 0.05% of the world total, 5.9 addresses per 1000 people (2012).

Internet service providers:

- 108 ISPs (2023);
- 100 ISPs (2018);
- 400 ISPs (2010);
- 11 ISPs (2000).

=== Internet censorship and surveillance ===
The OpenNet Initiative listed Nigeria as showing no evidence of Internet filtering in all four areas that it tested (political, social, conflict/security, and Internet tools) in October 2009.

There are few government restrictions on access to the Internet or credible reports that the government monitors e-mail or Internet chat rooms. Although the constitution and law provide for freedom of speech, including for members of the press, the government sometimes restricts these rights in practice. Libel is a civil offense and requires defendants to prove the truth of opinion or value judgment contained in news reports or commentaries. Penalties include two years' imprisonment and possible fines. Militant groups such as Boko Haram threaten, attack, and kill journalists in connection with their reporting of the sect's activities. Journalists practice self-censorship.

Reporting on political corruption and security issues has proved to be particularly sensitive. On 24 October 2012 police in Bauchi State arraigned civil servant Abbas Ahmed Faggo before a court for allegedly defaming the character of Governor Isa Yuguda after he posted messages on his Facebook account accusing the governor of spending public funds on his son's wedding. On 4 November, the court discharged Faggo, but media reported the state government fired him later that month.

During 2012 several Internet news sites critical of the government experienced server problems, which site owners attributed to government interference. Such disruptions usually lasted a few hours.

In 2008 two journalists were arrested for publishing online articles and photos critical of the government.

On 4 June 2021, the Minister of Information and Culture announced that the federal government would "suspend" all operations of Twitter in the country for performing actions that "[undermine] Nigeria’s corporate existence", and that the federal government would order the National Broadcasting Commission to "immediately commence the process of licensing all OTT and social media operations" in the country. This came after Twitter deleted posts by and suspended the account of President Muhammadu Buhari for violating its abuse policy, for making threats against the separatist group Indigenous People of Biafra which had invoked the Nigerian Civil War as a theme. Buhari criticised the actions for infringing his freedom of speech. Pursuant to this action, Twitter has been blocked in Nigeria as of 5 June, and use of the service was made a prosecutable offence. On 13 January 2022, Nigerian government revoked the ban on Twitter after the company agreed to set up a subsidiary in Nigeria for judicial compliance.

== See also ==
- Nigerian weather and communications satellites
- Media in Nigeria
- Terrestrial fibre optic cable projects in Nigeria
- Digital divide in Nigeria
- satellite internet
- satellite internet constellation
- rural internet
