= Politics Nigeria =

Independent daily newspaper

- Current logo for the newspaper
- Type: Daily newspaper
- Format: Broadsheet
- Owner: Family
- Founded: 2016
- Language: English
- Headquarters: Lagos
- Country: Nigeria
- Website: politicsnigeria.com

Politics Nigeria is an independent daily and digital newspaper headquartered in Lagos, Nigeria launched in August 2016

== History ==
Politics Nigeria was launched in August 2016. The paper is published in two formats: daily broadsheet print edition issued and distributed across newsstands in Nigeria and the online version which is continuously updated. The website of the online version of Politics Nigeria went live on 22 August 2016. In 2019, Alexa listed the paper's website among top 300 websites in Nigeria. The paper came to limelight following its report on an alleged scandal involving two Indian nationals and a Nigerian billionaire Femi Otedola. Politics Nigeria runs polls on candidates running for election on its website. In 2018, the paper conducted a poll on popularity of president Muhammadu Buhari for re-election for a second term in office. The result of the poll showed 70 per cent of respondents voted against the president's re-election.

== Content ==
The mission of Politics Nigeria Newspaper is delivering unbiased and investigative reports to Nigerians. Its editorial piece and cover story often tagged ‘analysis’ published weekly focuses on critical issues of governance and accountability. The paper features a broad mix of news, and carries mainly Nigeria-focused coverage of politics, economy and business, corruption radar, factchecks and opinion articles.
