= Complete Sports =

Nigerian sports newspaper

- Type: Daily newspaper
- Format: Broadsheet
- Founder: Sunny Obazu-Ojeagbase
- Publisher: Complete Communications Limited
- Editor-in-chief: Sunny Obazu-Ojeagbase
- Editor: Mumuni Alao; Dare Esan; Kazeem Tijani
- Deputy editor: Oladimejo Loko
- General manager: Lydia Oyekanmi
- Launched: December 1995; 30 years ago
- Language: English
- Headquarters: Isolo, Lagos
- Country: Nigeria
- Circulation: 124,000
- Readership: 13–55 years
- Sister newspapers: SuccessDigest Extra
- Website: completesports.com

Complete Sports is a Nigerian daily national sports newspaper and has its headquarters in Isolo, a local government area in Lagos State. It was first published in 1995 as the flagship newspaper of Complete Communications Limited and has gone on to become one of the most widely read newspaper in Nigeria. The newspaper focuses primarily on Nigerian sports personalities particularly Nigerian footballers.

Complete Sports is circulated around Nigeria and some parts of Benin and Cameroon thus making it one of the most circulated newspaper in West Africa.

== See also ==
- List of Nigerian newspapers
