= Sunny Obazu-Ojeagbase =

Nigerian business coach (1950–2022)

- Born: 31 December 1950; Osogbo, Osun State, Nigeria
- Died: 26 February 2022 (aged 71); Atlanta, Georgia, U.S.
- Education: University of Lagos
- Occupations: Author; business mogul; pastor
- Years active: 1976–2022
- Known for: Founder of Complete Sports

Sunny Obazu-Ojeagbase (31 December 1950 – 26 February 2022) was the first person to publish sport news in Nigeria and he started publishing with Sports Souvenir weekly newspaper in 1984. He was a business coach, author, pastor and a publisher. He is the founder of Complete Communications Limited, a company that houses Complete Sports newspaper and he also started two other magazines, now defunct, Climax Magazine and International Soccer Review.

== Early life and education ==
Obazu-Ojeagbase was born to Edo State parents in Osogbo, a local government area in Osun State where he completed his basic education at St. James' Primary School, Osogbo in 1962. He proceeded to be enlisted into the Nigerian Army after working as a printer trainee. He also held a Diploma in Mass Communication from the University of Lagos.

== Career ==
Obazu-Ojeagbase worked as a sports reporter for several media houses including Herald Newspaper, Daily Times, Concord Group of Newspapers and The Guardian. In 1983, he started publishing a weekly sports newspaper called Sports Souvenir after he quit his job as a reporter for The Guardian newspaper and he went on to publish Complete Football with the former becoming the first Nigerian sports newspaper while the latter became the first Nigerian all-colour monthly football magazine.

In 1995, he published Complete Sports, a daily sports newspaper and Success Digest Magazine a business establishment guide which has gone on to become one of the most widely read newspapers and magazines in Nigeria.

== Personal life and death ==
Obazu-Ojeagbase died in Atlanta, Georgia, on 26 February 2022, at the age of 71.

== Publications ==
Some of Sunny Obazu-Ojeagbase published works include:

- How to Make It in Nigeria – Building Your Wealth from Ground Floor Up
- How to Bullet Proof Yourself from Poverty, Ideas – The Starting Point of All True Riches
