= National Network (newspaper) =

Nigerian newspaper

- Type: Weekly newspaper
- Format: Tabloid
- Owner: Jerry Needam
- Publisher: Network Printing and Publishing Company
- Editor-in-chief: Chris Konkwo
- Associate editor: G. K. Girigiri
- Founded: 25 November 2004
- Language: English
- Headquarters: No 6 Udi Street, Diobu, Rivers State
- City: Port Harcourt
- Country: Nigeria
- Website: nationalnetworkonline.com

The National Network is an English language Nigerian weekly newspaper founded 25 November 2004. It is published by Network Printing and Publishing Company and has its headquarters in the Diobu area of Port Harcourt, Rivers State. Topics the newspaper covers include local and national main news, sports, business, political events and personalities.

In January 2005, Jerry Needam, owner of the paper was arrested at his office for allegedly fabricating a news report aimed at tarnishing Rivers State Police commissioner Sylvester Araba's image and reputation.

In 2011, National Network celebrated the "seventh" anniversary of its foundation. The ceremony which took place at the Silverbird Hall, Port Harcourt, was the most attended of its kind in the state's history. Individual awards were also presented to prominent citizens deemed to have excelled to the highest degree in their chosen fields.

== See also ==
- List of Nigerian newspapers
