= Salihu Ayatullahi =

Nigerian investigative journalist

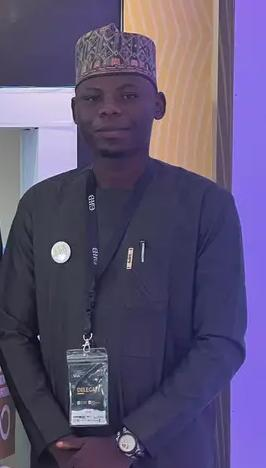
- Born: December 24; Ilorin, Kwara State, Nigeria
- Citizenship: Nigerian
- Education: University of Ilorin
- Occupation: Investigative journalist
- Years active: 2017-present

Salihu Ayatullahi, born in Ilorin, Kwara State, Nigeria, is a Nigerian investigative journalist currently serving as the Editor-in-Chief of The Informant247. He was part of the founding team of the news organization.

With a strong focus on investigative reporting, Ayatullahi has led the North-Central based newspaper in delivering critical coverage on government policies, corruption and human rights abuses in Nigeria.

== Background and career ==
He completed his primary and secondary education in his hometown of Ilorin, Kwara State, Nigeria. He later proceeded to the University of Ilorin for his tertiary education.

He has worked in various newsrooms as both a reporter and an editor before assuming the role of Editor-in-Chief at The Informant247.

At The Informant247, he has overseen the production of several investigative reports as head of the editorial board, many of which have had significant impacts. He also supervises FactCheck247, an independent fact-checking organization.

In 2023, Ayatullahi represented his news organization when it was selected for the International Center for Journalists (ICFJ) Elevate program, a transformative global initiative aimed at empowering 18 C-level journalists from across the world.

During the program, he earned a business certificate from Babson College in Massachusetts, United States.

== Critical reporting ==
In 2023, the Nigerian journalist published an exposé uncovering an illegal border route in the Baruteen Local Government Area of Kwara State, where smugglers collaborated with security operatives to smuggle contraband into Nigeria from Benin Republic.

Later that year, he uncovered a site where lithium is illegal mined in Nigeria, with no oversight. His investigation traced and identified how a powerful Chinese-owned company that had been evading taxes and underreporting its activities is behind the operation. This report was cross-published by six different media outlets.

Following its publication, authorities and security agencies intervened and conducted a raid on the Kankafu village, where the illegal mining was taking place.

In 2024, he released a two-month-long investigation into how the electoral body in Kwara State suppressed voters and manipulated election results to favour the ruling All Progressives Congress (APC). He gathered evidence of several ‘electoral manipulations’ and documented discrepancies in the election results, as well as widespread disenfranchisement caused by shortages of electoral materials, despite billions of naira released for the election. The investigation also included exclusive footage showing officials tampering with thumb-printed ballot papers.

After the report was published, the opposition Peoples Democratic Party (PDP), citing the videos and documentary evidence from the investigation, held a press conference to reject the election results and vowed to challenge them in court. The chairman of the electoral body was also dragged to the Economic and Financial Crimes Commission (EFCC) by an independent organization to account for the N1.5 billion the report revealed he had spent.

== Legal challenges ==
In the wake of several investigative reports exposing corruption at the state-owned Kwara State Polytechnic, Ayatullahi, along with one of his reporters, was arrested by the Nigerian Police. They were later released following pressure from various international and local organizations, such as the Committee to Protect Journalists (CPJ), International Press Institute (IPI), Media Foundation for West Africa (MFWA), Coalition for Whistleblowers Protection and Press Freedom (CWPPF), and Socio-Economic Rights and Accountability Project (SERAP), among several others, who condemned the arrest.

The case was eventually brought before a court. The prosecutor however, failed to present evidence to support the defamation case, and the charges were dismissed.

Meanwhile, several individuals at the Polytechnic were subsequently either demoted or dismissed as a result of the findings.

== Membership ==
In 2023, he joined the France-based Forbidden Stories’s SafeBox Network, a platform where some of the world’s most threatened journalists are securing their sensitive information.

He is also a member of the Association of Kwara Online Media Practitioners, a body for journalists based in Nigeria’s North Central Kwara State.
