= Obaland Magazine =

Newspaper and magazine in Nigeria

- Editor: Edwin Odeh
- Categories: Newspaper, internet television and podcast
- Format: Newspaper
- Publisher: Obaland Magazine
- Founder: Lucky Omosigho
- Founded: 2009
- Company: Obaland Magazine and multichoice media house
- Country: Nigeria
- Language: English
- Website: obalandmagazine.com

The Obaland Magazine is a Nigerian daily national newspaper and a weekly Magazine, "Obaland" means (Land of the King) in Edo language was established in memory of Oba Ewuare published by Obaland Magazine and multichoice media house, on its website obalandmagazine.com and papers. In 2009, the magazine was founded by Obaland Magazine and multichoice media house in Nigeria, to be launched also in Turin by Davido. and distributed around the Nigerian regions and in Piedmont region in Italy. The magazine was successful selling 25,000 magazine printed copies at the launch ceremony. The Obaland Magazine and multichoice media house was founded by a Journalist, Mr Lucky Omosigho, who previously worked as a correspondent reporter in Nigerian Observer and RAI. In 2018, Obaland Magazine investigative journalist Lucky Omosigho, wrote an article about African international human traffickers, that lead to the arrest of 300 suspected perpetrators from Italy, Nigeria and Ghana by Italian interpol. During a press conference held in Ghana related to the arrests, Lucky Omosigho was honored as Gentleman of the Press by Jerry Rawlings in Ghana. On June 20, 2021, Obaland Magazine's chief editor Lucky Omosigho was arrested by armed men from Department of State Services (DSS) in Edo state, because he wrote and published a news article against Nigeria president Muhammadu Buhari's bad governance on Democracy day, the article was further deleted by DSS officers. On June 21, 2021, Mr Lucky re-gained freedom from Department of State Services (DSS), after offering them a huge sum of money to save his dear life.

== Crisis ==
In 2021, Obaland Magazine went experiencing financial crisis, after the media company's account was confiscated by Supreme Court of Cassation (Italy) for tax evasion crime. The company loosed reporters and went on their official website to announce job opportunities for young journalists in Nigeria to report from rural areas in the northern part of Nigeria.
