= Job's Wife =

Play by Philip Begho

Job's Wife is a play by Philip Begho, written in verse. It was the winner of the Association of Nigerian Authors (ANA) Drama Prize in 2002. It is an interpretation of the biblical Book of Job.

== Plot ==
Job himself never appears onstage, the crucial character being his wife who is hardly mentioned in the Bible except for her spurious advice to Job. We meet her packing to leave him and dissociate herself from his misfortunes. It is evident that she believes he suffers for his sins and has become separated from God, so she is free to start a new life on her own. Her maid Reibah tries to stop her with the only means she can come up with – the lie that a powerful healer is coming, only for her conscience to trouble her afterwards. She is soothed by Nali, who promises to do her own bit to delay Job's wife; Nali has a vague belief that Reibah's lie has a kernel of truth, that in one way or another, time will bring healing.

Thus Nali works at cross-purposes rather than helping her mistress in the way she wants to be helped, as well as her ridiculous speech about how she will accompany her.

When the mysterious Healer actually does appear, the supernatural is dramatically tamed by Job's wife's indignation that he wasn't announced by a servant, and that he should have knocked; she naturally presumes he is the one Reibah spoke of. The Healer eases Job's suffering offstage, but his real business is with the wife's hypocrisy, brought out as he questions the reason for her behaviour.

What he gradually teaches her and the audience is balanced with the mutual incomprehension and comic exchanges between mistress and Nali, who can't see the Healer, and yet speaks the truth about him even as the woman concludes the girl is mad. When the Healer condemns the harm Job's friends have done, she defends them, showing that their error is also hers, in weakening Job and depleting his moral courage and faith. He explains to her that suffering is purposeful and meant to teach, but not necessarily the sufferer, who sometimes far from being guilty, is sometimes one “found worthy to bear the suffering that instructs his fellows and for this service his reward is sure.”

The Healer gets the wife to turn her attention to what Job's suffering has taught her about herself, for rather than deepening in compassion and love, she became a hypocrite, deceiving herself about her real motives, which have more to do with the loss of Job's prosperity. What she must learn is introduced in bits, for Job's wife has a positive self-image and resists seeing her guilt and Job's innocence.

== See also ==
- Philip Begho
