= Naija News =

Nigerian online newspaper

- Type: Daily newspaper
- Founder: Opemipo Olawale Adeniyi
- Publisher: Polance Media Ltd
- Editor: George Ogbolu
- Deputy editor: Oladipo Abiola
- Associate editor: Enioluwa Adeniyi
- Founded: 2016
- Language: English
- Headquarters: Lagos, Nigeria
- Website: www.naijanews.com

Naija News is a Nigerian newspaper published by Polance Media Ltd., based in Lagos. It covers local and national news, politics, metro, business, entertainment, sports and opinions.

The site emphasizes independent coverage of Nigerian politics, economy, security, entertainment, sports, and global events affecting Africa, positioning itself as a go-to source for readers seeking updates beyond traditional print media. It has sustained operations through digital-native strategies, marking milestones like its fifth anniversary in 2021 amid a competitive landscape of online journalism in Nigeria.

== History ==
Naija News was established in 2016 and by Polance Media Limited. In 2021, the newspaper moved its operations to Ikoyi in Lagos. From inception, Naija News differentiated itself through 24/7 updates and a focus on investigative reporting, quickly gaining traction as a go-to resource for Nigerians seeking timely, unfiltered information. Operating from Lagos under Polance Media Limited, the platform's early growth reflected Adeniyi's vision of filling gaps in accessible, boundary-breaking journalism during a period of rising digital media consumption in Nigeria.

== Growth and development ==
In January 2017, Naija News launched the EcoWatch project, a dedicated initiative to disseminate information on climate change risks, impacts, and mitigation strategies tailored to Nigerian audiences. To broaden its reach among northern Nigerian and West African communities, the outlet introduced a Hausa-language news section in June 2019, expanding beyond English-only content to address linguistic diversity in news consumption. By July 2021, Naija News underwent a rebranding and relocated its headquarters to 103 Awolowo Road, Ikoyi, Lagos, reflecting operational scaling and improved infrastructure to support growing editorial demands. The platform has since enhanced its digital footprint, including mobile app development, with reported averages of over 2,000 monthly downloads for its news applications as of recent analyses. This aligns with the broader surge in Nigeria's digital news sector, where platforms collectively drew 1.6 billion visits in 2023 amid rising internet penetration and smartphone adoption.
