= Jerry Needam =

Jerry Needam (born 2 March 1966) is a journalist, newspaper publisher and politician from Rivers State, a reverend and diocesan media communicator of the Christ Army Church of Nigeria (CACN), former editor of the Ogoni Star newspaper, and owner of the Nigerian weekly tabloid National Network. He is Special Adviser on Media and Publicity to Felix A. Obuah, the Rivers State People's Democratic Party chairman. He is also a former Spokesperson of the Action Congress of Rivers State.

== See also ==
- National Network (newspaper)
- List of people from Rivers State
- Movement for the Survival of the Ogoni People
