= NewsOnline =

Nigerian online newspaper

NewsOnline Nigeria
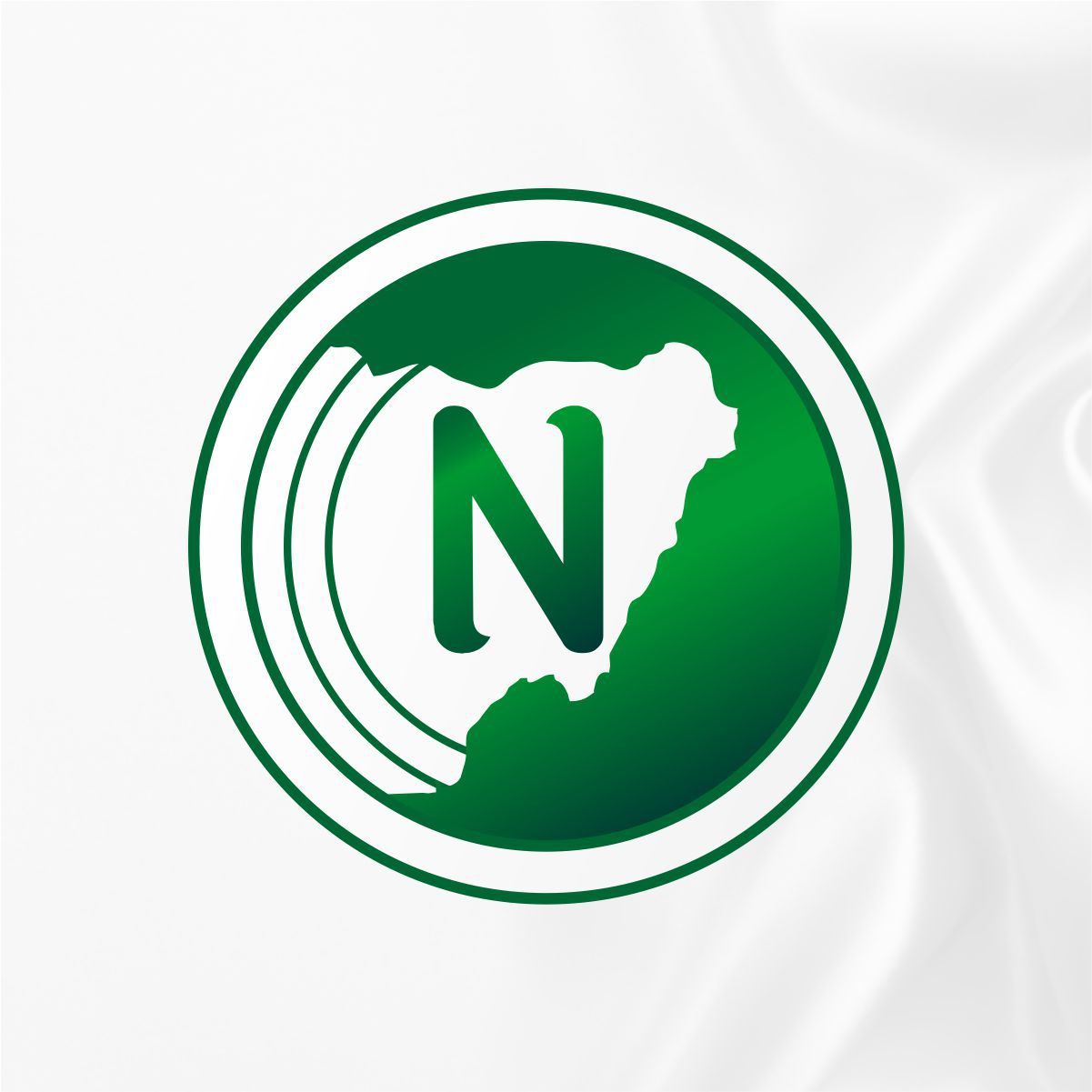
- Website type: News, Entertainment, Politics
- Available in: English, Hausa
- Founded: 2020; 6 years ago
- Headquarters: Lagos, Nigeria
- Area served: Nigeria
- Founder: Mmadubugwu Nonso Justice
- Website: www.newsonlineng.com
- Registration: None
- Launched: 2020
- Current status: Active
- Written in: HTML, CSS, JavaScript

NewsOnline Nigeria is an independent online newspaper based in Nigeria. It was founded by Mr Mmadubugwu Nonso Justice, who serves as chairman and editor-in-chief of the NewsOnline Nigeria.

== History ==
The newspaper, published by Winner’s Media Concept was established in 2020. In 2021, the newspaper moved its operations to Lagos.

== Project ==
Newsonline Nigeria partnered with Rotary for PAD A GIRL 2.0 Campaign project held in Ntezi, Ebonyi State, Nigeria.

== Awards ==
The founder and editor-in-chief of NewsOnline Nigeria was selected among the 30 Anambra under 35 CEOs for special recognition in the celebration of Anambra at 30.
