= Uhuru Times =

Nigerian online newspaper

Uhuru Times (RC. 601620).
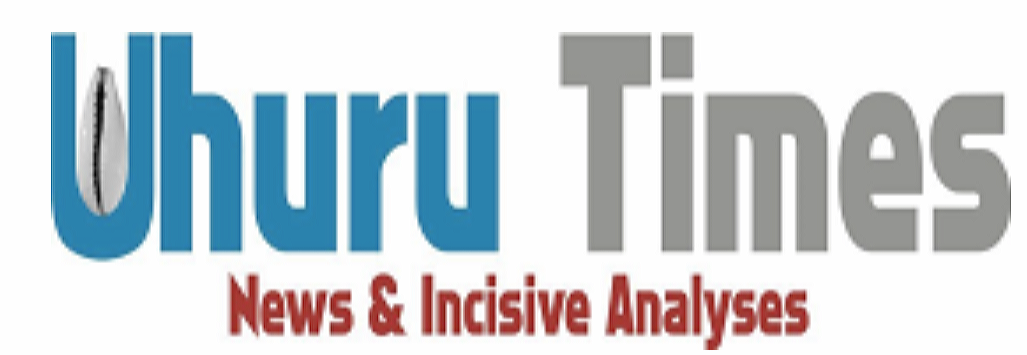
- Type: Daily newspaper
- Format: Tabloid
- Owner: Journal Communications Limited
- Founder: Wale Adedayo
- Publisher: Journal Communications Limited
- Editor: Wale Adedayo
- Founded: 2007
- Ceased publication: 2010
- Relaunched: 2015
- Language: English
- Headquarters: Ogun State
- ISSN: 1597-7862
- Website: uhurutimes.com

The Uhuru Times is an online Nigerian newspaper and published monthly printed paper in publication of Journal Communication Limited.

The newspaper was founded in 2007 by Wale Adebayo who was editor in The Punch newspaper with the head office in Ogun State. The newspaper is a full monthly colour publication like the New York Times and the print edition stop in 2015 due financial situation and return as daily online newspaper. The newspaper was a vision foundation that relies on Chief Obafemi Awolowo political philosophy about man place in society and how the political leaders behave or their best doing in leadership. The Newsline holds a yearly event awards on political leaders in how they use their leadership position.
