= Online Media Practitioners Association of Nigeria =

- Abbreviation: OMPAN
- Formation: March 2018
- Type: Professional association
- Headquarters: Akwa Ibom, Nigeria
- National President: James Emeh Anyalekwa (Igbere TV founder)
- Website: https://ompan-org.blogspot.com/?m=1

The Online Media Practitioners Association of Nigeria (OMPAN) is a Nigerian association of digital news practitioners founded in March 2018 to bring together bloggers, online publishers and other digital media practitioners.

The association promotes professional ethics, responsible online publishing and cooperation among practitioners.

In 30–31 March 2018, the new media association held its first national convention in Owerri, Imo State where National Executive Council were appointed through all geopolitical zones to oversee its affairs.

== #Owerri2018 ==
During the formation phase and preparation of the National convention, the event planners used the hashtag "#Owerri2018" to promote and create awareness for the event on social media platforms. The strategic publicity gave room for more attendance of media practitioners across the country.The convention later took place at Imo State Trade and Investment Center, Owerri. Fidelis Kene Chiekezie of Throwback Times Nigeria was part of the conveners.

After the National convention, the media Association begin to establish state chapters, although the chapter establishment began immediately in the convention auditorium.

The association's pivotal aim is to defend publisher's right to freedom of expression, share helpful knowledge among others. Its structure differed from older professional media organisations because it was created specifically around online publishing and related digital practices.
