= Throwback (1/3) =

Sculpture by Tony Smith

- Artist: Tony Smith
- Year: 1976–1979
- Type: Aluminum, painted black
- Dimensions: 202.26 cm × 493.4 cm × 267.97 cm (79.63 in × 194.3 in × 105.50 in)
- Location: New York City; 40°45′23.65″N 73°58′53.84″W

Throwback (1/3) is a public artwork by American artist Tony Smith, located in the Marsh & McLennan Companies (MMC) Plaza at 1166 Avenue of the Americas in Midtown Manhattan, New York City, New York.

== Description ==
The sculpture was constructed by welding sheets of aluminum together at precise angles to form a geometric, four-sided, hollow ring. The sculpture is coated with a flat-black industrial exterior paint, either called Retardo or polyurethane. Currently sited in a brick-lined fountain basin, the sculpture rests on three points.

Smith named the sculpture while in a retrospective mood. He explains, “In a certain sense the piece is unique. I did not have the prospect or opportunity of making a large architectural sculpture so I decided to do something more conventional. I made an object that recalls an earlier period.”

== Historical information ==
According to modern art historian Sam Hunter, “his major piece, Throwback, is based on the regular geometric solids of this familiar combination of tetrahedrons and octahedrons, the basic space frame for all his ambitious, conjoined sculpture. Although it is less eccentric or fanciful in its spatial sprawl than some of his complex monumental sculpture its shifting silhouettes and planar configurations can still dazzle the eye of the circulating spectator.” The catalogue text continues to support this, stating that “Throwback shows all the hallmarks of Smith’s ponderous yet graceful and versatile formal constellations.”

Smith created Throwback in an edition of three; this one is the first, while the San Francisco Museum of Modern Art owns the second in its collection (Throwback (2/3)). The Hirshhorn Museum and Sculpture Garden owns Throwback (3/3), which is on view. All three were created between 1976-1979 and are aluminum painted black and equal in size.

=== Location history ===
The public space where the first edition of Tony Smith’s Throwback series was originally built in 1972. Historically, the space, now called MMC plaza, has functioned as one of the most popular public places in the New York City. It was renovated in 1981 by Skidmore, Owings and Merrill LLP (SOM) in cooperation with Sasaki Associates as International Paper Plaza. After that, the plaza was renovated again in 1989 by R.M. Kliment & Frances Halsband Architects. Originally, there were a square brick water fountain and water cascades on which Throwback was placed, which made the sculpture look floating on the water. Also, there was a little grove which had functioned as a trademark of the plaza, symbolizing the features of its host, the International Paper Company.

Now, Marsh & McLennan, whose business includes risk and insurance services, investment management and consulting, owns a 70 percent share in the building and the public space, known as MMC plaza. The most recent redesign of the plaza was completed in 2001 by Pasanella, Klein, Stolzman, Berg, Architects (PKSB). After the recent renovation, The water cascades along with the rectangular brick fountain were removed, keeping its centerpiece sculpture Throwback.

=== Acquisition ===
The sculpture was made between 1976 and 1979 and is one of an edition of three. It was originally owned by International Paper Company until 1987. The company, which was located at 77 West 45th Street until 1987, was responsible for purchasing and installing the sculpture. The property is now jointly owned by New York Telephone and Marsh & McLennan Company, and is administered by Cushman & Wakefield.

== Condition ==
The first edition of Tony Smith’s Throwback series was surveyed in April 1993 and conservators assessed that the sculpture had been “well maintained.”

== See also ==
- List of Tony Smith sculptures
- The Tony Smith Artist Research Project in Wikipedia
