= Throwback (3/3) =

- Artist: Tony Smith
- Year: 1976–1979
- Type: Aluminum, painted black
- Dimensions: 206.4 cm × 395.9 cm × 242.9 cm (81 1/4 in × 155 7/8 in × 95 5/8 in)
- Location: Hirshhorn Museum and Sculpture Garden; Washington, D.C., United States; 38°53′17.34″N 77°1′20.48″W
- Owner: Smithsonian Institution

Throwback is a public artwork by American artist Tony Smith, located at the Hirshhorn Museum and Sculpture Garden in Washington, D.C., United States. This version is the third of an edition of three in the series with one artist's proof.

== Description ==
The artwork is constructed sheets of aluminum that have been welded together to form a geometric, four-sided, hollow, elongated ring. The sculpture is coated with a flat-black industrial fluoropolymer exterior paint applied to achieve a matte finish. Sited on a patch of turf in the Sculpture Garden of the Hirshhorn, the sculpture is supported by three subterranean plates with brackets at three points.

== Historical information ==
In the early to mid-sixties, Smith experimented with tetrahedral and octahedral forms in sculptures such as Willy and Amaryllis. Over a decade later, Smith returned to these earlier geometries with Throwback. Thus the title of the work alludes to this act of looking back. Smith elaborated on this point, "In a certain sense the piece is unique. I did not have the prospect or opportunity of making a large architectural sculpture so I decided to do something more conventional. I made an object that recalls an earlier period."

The International Paper Company was the first to purchase the first sculpture of the edition and originally displayed it at the company's New York headquarters. It is public property of the city of New York and on display at 1166 Avenue of the Americas.

The second version was purchased for the San Francisco Museum of Modern Art and placed on display no later than 2010. The artists proof has not been fabricated.

Several other versions of the work exist. In 1976, a smaller (62 × 150 inches) version of the work was installed at Grove Isle, Coconut Grove, Florida. A full-scale plywood model, painted black, was created for exhibition at the Pace Gallery in 1979. A cardboard maquette (measuring 13 1/2 × 32 1/2 × 16 inches) was intended to serve as the model of an edition of 9 bronzes. However, the maquette was ultimately produced in a numbered edition of 6.

=== Acquisition ===
While the work is dated from 1976–1977, the Hirshhorn's edition of the work was acquired from the Pace Gallery in 1980. Lippincott, Inc fabricated the sculpture in North Haven, Connecticut, in the same year.

== See also ==
- List of public art in Washington, D.C., Ward 2
- List of Tony Smith sculptures
- The Tony Smith Artist Research Project in Wikipedia
