= Ripples Nigeria =

Nigerian online English newspaper

- Type: Online newspaper
- Publisher: Richmond Hill Media Limited
- Editor-in-chief: Samuel Ibemere
- Managing editor: Edirin Etaghene, Chidi Chinedu
- Founded: May 2015
- Language: English
- Headquarters: Lagos, Nigeria
- Website: www.ripplesnigeria.com

Ripples Nigeria is a Nigerian online newspaper based in Lagos. It was launched in 2015. It is an independent, pro-investigation multi-media online news platform focused primarily on politics, policy and economy.

== Awards and nominations ==
In October 2017, Ripples Nigeria correspondent Obakeye Akin emerged finalist in the Business and Economy category of the PwC Media Excellence Awards. He was announced third place winner.

In December 2017, Ebere Ndukwu of Ripples Nigeria was among ten Nigerian journalists celebrated at the 12th Wole Soyinka Investigative awards. He got a commendation in the online category.

In February 2018, Kelechukwu Iruoma of Ripples Nigeria, participated in the International Center for Journalists (ICFJ) and United Nations Foundation Program that produced more than 50 stories on topics such as migration linked to conflict, flooding and desertification, and the resulting impact on health and economic security. He emerged third place winner.

In July 2021, Ripples Nigeria won Google News Initiative Innovation Challenge for Middle East, Turkey and Africa. Its pitch, Eco-Nai+, a geo-data and geo-journalism project, that will lead to the creation of Nigeria's first interactive digital geo-journalism platform, was selected for funding.

== Ripples Centre for Data and Investigative Journalism ==
Ripples Centre for Data and Investigative Journalism (RCDIJ) is a non-profit organization founded by Ripples Nigeria to support quality multimedia-based projects in investigative and data journalism, training, public advocacy and other social projects in vital areas of public interest in Nigeria.

In 2018, the organization launched an annual forum called Ripples Nigeria Dialogue, to encourage debate on the current state of the country.

Nobel laureate, professor Wole Soyinka gave the keynote address for the maiden edition entitled "Rebuilding trust in a divided Nigeria". His speech was titled Miyetti to Haiti; Notes from a Solidarity Visit. Other notable speakers were former Anambra state governor, Peter Obi, Abiola Akiyode-Afolabi and Pat Utomi. The event was moderated by Reuben Abati former special adviser on media and publicity to former president Goodluck Jonathan.
