= Osun Defender =

Nigerian tabloid newspaper

- Type: Daily newspaper
- Format: Tabloid
- Publisher: Moremi Publishing House Ltd.
- Editor: Ismaeel Uthman
- Headquarters: Osogbo, Osun State
- Website: Official website

The Osun Defender founded in 2006, is a privately owned tabloid newspaper that publishes news about Osun State, Nigeria, as well as national and other news. It is published by Moremi Publishing House Ltd, of Osogbo, Osun State. Kola Olabisi is the managing editor. The Osun Defender claims to have the sixth most visited newspaper website in Nigeria. The newspaper has traditionally been the voice of the Action Congress of Nigeria (ACN) political party.

During the April 2007 elections, an attempt was made to assassinate Rauf Adesoji Aregbesola, the ACN candidate for governor. Kola Olabisi, editor of the Osun Defender, almost died when a bullet passed through his dress without harming him. On 14 May 2007 the newspaper published a story with title "Osun Police Arrest 764 Over Election Protest", discussing a news conference by activist Amitolu Shittu where he discussed the trial of demonstrators protesting what they said was rigging of the 14 April presidential election. Shittu accused the Judge of releasing demonstrators in return for bribes. The judge promptly issued arrest warrants for Shittu, the reporter who wrote the article and managing editor Kola Olabisi, all of whom went into hiding.
