= Frank Aigbogun =

Nigerian journalist

- Born: 1 November 1956 (age 69)
- Education: Institute of Management and Technology, Enugu
- Occupation: Journalist

Frank Aigbogun (born 1 November 1956) is a Nigerian journalist, publisher, and media executive. He is the co‑founder and publisher of BusinessDay.

Aigbogun studied mass communication at the Institute of Management and Technology. He began his journalism career in 1982 at The Guardian in Lagos. He went on to work as a Lagos correspondent for the Associated Press, and later joined Vanguard newspaper, where he served as deputy editor and subsequently editor of the newspaper.

He was a president of the Lagos Business School Alumni Association. In January 2025, Aigbogun was appointed chairman of the Impact Investors Foundation (IIF), also joining its advisory board (NABII) as vice‑chair. In April 2025, he was elected chairman of the Board of Trustees of the Institute of Management and Technology (IMT) Alumni Association (FAA‑IMT) during an election held in Enugu.
