= Prime 9ja Online =

Nigerian online daily newspaper

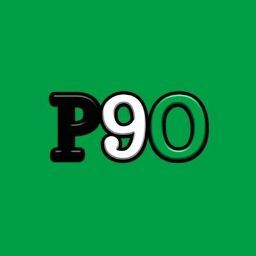
- Type: Online newspaper
- Owner: Prime 9ja Online Media
- Founder: Chima Joseph Ugo
- Publisher: Prime 9ja Online Media
- Editor-in-chief: Chima Joseph Ugo
- News editor: Oshobukola Precious
- Founded: 11 March 2016; 10 years ago
- Language: English, Nigerian pidgin
- Headquarters: Edo State, Nigeria
- Circulation: 120,930 daily (as of 7 April 2023)
- Sister newspapers: Prime 9ja Online Pidgin
- Website: www.prime9ja.com.ng

Prime 9ja Online is a Nigerian online newspaper published by Prime 9ja Online Media based in Edo State, Nigeria that provides news and analysis on politics, business, entertainment, sports, and more. The website was launched in 2016 by Chima Joseph Ugo with the aim of providing Nigerians and Africans with accurate and reliable news and information.

== History ==
Prime 9ja Online is an online news and media website founded by Chima Joseph Ugo in 2016 with its headquarters in Okada Edo, Nigeria.

In June 2022, Stamp Nigeria ranked Prime 9ja Online among the 19 fastest-growing newspaper startups in Nigeria.

In March 2023, they launched a news section in Pidgin language.

== Pidgin version ==
In addition to their standard English version, Prime 9ja Online recently launched a Pidgin version of their website, Prime 9ja Online Pidgin. The aim is to reach out to more Nigerians who may understand Pidgin English better than Standard English. This move ensures that they bring the news to the grassroots and give more people access to correct and reliable news and information.
