= Etcetera Ejikeme =

Nigerian musician

- Also known as: Etcetera
- Born: Paschal Uche Ejikeme; 14 December 1975 (age 50); Warri, Delta State, Nigeria
- Genre: Alternative Music
- Occupations: Singer; songwriter; radio personality; columnist; social activist
- Years active: 2004–present
- Label: X3M Music

Paschal Uche Ejikeme (/ˈʊtʃeɪ/ /ˈeɪdʒikɛmɛ/;born December 14, 1975), better known by his stage name Etcetera Ejikeme, is a Nigerian singer, songwriter, social activist, columnist and radio personality.

In 2004, Etcetera Ejikeme met OJB Jezreel and Joekaynie to record his first studio song Michelle, which gained nationwide airplay. That same year, he recorded two more songs, Love Should Last and Life For You. In 2007, he met Steve Babaeko through a friend and signed to X3M Music on a three-year and two albums contract that expired in 2010.

== Early life and education ==
Etcetera Ejikeme was born in Warri, Delta State in south-southern Nigeria and is the seventh of nine children of David and Cecilia Ejikeme. His father was a prison warden and his mother was a petty trader. He is of Igbo descent and hails from Amiyi in Njaba Local Government Area of Imo State, southeastern Nigeria. He had his primary education at Dogho Primary School Warri, Delta State, Nigeria from 1981 to 1984 and Central Primary School Kirikiri Town Apapa, Lagos State, Nigeria from 1984 to 1987 respectively. His secondary education was at Dr. Lucas Memorial High School, Kirikiri Town Apapa, Lagos State, Nigeria from 1988 to 1994. He moved to Baltimore, Maryland United States of America in 2016.

== Controversy ==
Etcetera Ejikeme took his social activism to his column Etcetera live in The Punch. He often called out the government of President Muhammadu Buhari over his fight against corruption and his style of government. This resulted in the alleged threat to his life. It was said that the alleged threat to his life was due to his constant criticism of the Nigerian government over the level of corruption and insecurity in the country as a columnist for The Punch. This led to his emigration to the United States in 2016. Etcetera Ejikeme also stated in one of his articles that Nigerian gospel songs are not uplifting enough. Even former President Goodluck Jonathan was not spared by the social critic. He extensively criticised the former Nigerian president for spending public funds on Nigerian entertainers as opposed to the millions of hungry citizens of the country. Etcetera Ejikeme described the attitude of Ohanaeze Ndigbo, an apex Igbo socio-cultural group in Nigeria in the 2015 Nigerian general elections as a betrayal of their mandate to Ndigbo.

== Feuds ==
Etcetera Ejikeme has engaged in online altercations with several celebrities, like M.I Abaga Tiwa Savage, Wizkid, Daddy Freeze Olisa Adibua Yomi Black.

== Career ==
Etcetera Ejikeme's musical journey started in 1988 as a member of St. Joseph Catholic Church Kirikiri Town, Apapa Lagos, Youth Organisation Band. It was during this time he learnt how to play the piano and decided to pursue a career in music. In 2000, the adventure led him to study music professionally at the Muson Centre for 2 years. He was signed to X3M Music on a 3-year 2-album contract from 2007 to 2010. It was during this time he released his first 2 albums. The self titled album Etcetera in 2007 which includes the hit track Michelle produced by himself and OJB Jezreel and Yes I am, in 2010. He Parted ways with X3M Music at the expiration of his contract. In 2011 he became a radio personality with Top Radio 90.9 FM, Nigeria. He extended his radio show Etcetera live to a column in The Punch in 2012. In 2014 after being away from music for 4 years he collaborated with Nigerian rapper Vector (rapper) on a single titled P&G. His column in The Punch and radio show on Top Radio 90.9 FM, Nigeria kept him away from music until 2016 when he emigrated to the United States of America. Etcetera Ejikeme has been of the opinion that there is no Music industry in Nigeria but rather just a bunch of individuals making a way for themselves in music.

While in the United States, in 2018 he released 2 singles titled “No Virgin in America” and “Free Your Mind and Your Feet Will Follow”. The songs are an extension of his usual criticism and how he is part of a campaign to rid Baltimore, the state where he is based in the United States, of crime and hard drugs. He is currently working on his third studio album, which is yet to be titled.

In 2019, Etcetera founded Federal Character, an online newspaper, which reports on politics, business, sports and entertainment, as well as promotes good governance and development.

Etcetera stated that he has started works on his third album which will be released in 2021. He has also announced plans to release his first book in 2020. A book he says is about "new-era of colonisation; the repackaged form of Slave trade, how the slave masters revolutionized their act to get the world's approval".

== Discography ==
=== Studio albums ===
- Etcetera (2007)
- Yes I am (2010)

== Federal Character ==
Federal Character
- Type: Online newspaper
- Founded: 2019
- Founder: Etcetera Ejikeme
- Headquarters: Maryland, USA
- Website: federalcharacter.com

Federal Character is an online newspaper based in Maryland in the United States of America. It was founded in 2019 by Etcetera Ejikeme. Federal Character focuses on promoting good governance, development and egalitarianism, whilst reporting extensively on politics, business, sports and entertainment.

=== History ===
Based in Maryland, Federal Character was founded in 2019 by Etcetera Ejikeme. A Nigerian journalist and musician, who previously ran a newspaper column in Nigerian daily newspaper, The Punch, titled Etcetera Live, where he addressed issues in governance in Nigeria, including insecurity and corruption. The newspaper has a team of writers based both in the United States and Nigeria.

In March 2023, Federal Character moved into its permanent office in the Towson area of Maryland. It was reported in April 2023, that Federal Character had hit over one million visitors to its website.

=== Legal issues ===
In December 2022, it was reported that Federal Character had been denied registration by the Corporate Affairs Commission (CAC) of Nigeria, citing the unavailability of the name, Federal Character. The newspaper had argued that it had registered and trademarked the name in the United States of America, and as such, it should be considered for registration in Nigeria.

In January 2023, afrobeats singer, Stella D'lyte, threatened to sue the newspaper publication for leaking the release dates for her album. Noting that the leak had a negative impact on her marketing strategy.
