= The Whistler (newspaper) =

Nigerian online newspaper

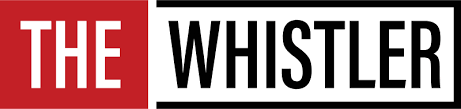
- The Whistler logo
- Type: Media publication
- Format: Daily Newspaper
- Publisher: James Ume
- Editor: Ifeanyi Onuba
- Deputy editor: Tayo Olu
- Managing editor: Tajudeen Suleiman
- General manager: Young Ozogwu
- News editor: Isuma Mark
- Founded: 2014; 12 years ago
- Language: English
- Headquarters: Abuja, Nigeria
- Website: www.thewhistler.ng

The Whistler is a Nigerian newspaper that belongs to the Guild of Corporate Online Publishers (GOCOP).

== History ==
The Whistler was established in 2014 by The Whistler Communications Limited. Headquartered in Abuja, it publishes news, investigative reporting, and analysis across politics, business, and social issues.

== Coverage ==
In May 2024, The Whistler reported that former Abia State Governor Okezie Ikpeazu allegedly misappropriated N10 billion for a non-existent airport project, paid to Ferotex Construction Company, based on a forensic audit by KPMG Advisory Services commissioned by Governor Alex Otti, prompting calls for EFCC investigations.

In February 2024, its journalist Kasarachi Aniagolu was arrested by the Nigerian Police Force while covering a raid on bureau de change operators in Wuse Zone 4, Abuja, and was released after eight hours in detention, prompting The Whistler to demand a police investigation and apology for press freedom violations.

The incident was condemned by the Coalition for Whistleblower Protection and Press Freedom as a violation of press freedom.

== Initiatives ==
In 2020, The Whistler Communications Limited partnered with Derasoft Consulting to organise a six-week online bootcamp, #CodeCamp for Youths.

== Awards and recognition ==
The founder and publisher of The Whistler received the Gani Fawehinmi Impact and Integrity Awards (GFIIA) from the Human and Environmental Development Agenda (HEDA) Resource Centre and the God’s Mission Ambassadors Award from the Presbyterian Church of Nigeria, Ketu Parish, Lagos, in 2023.

In 2023, The Whistler hosted its annual awards event in Abuja, presenting the Transparency and Innovation Award to the Nigerian National Petroleum Company Ltd. (NNPC Ltd.), accepted by former Group Chief Executive Officer Mele Kyari from Abia State Governor Alex Otti.
