= Nigerian Compass =

Nigerian daily English newspaper

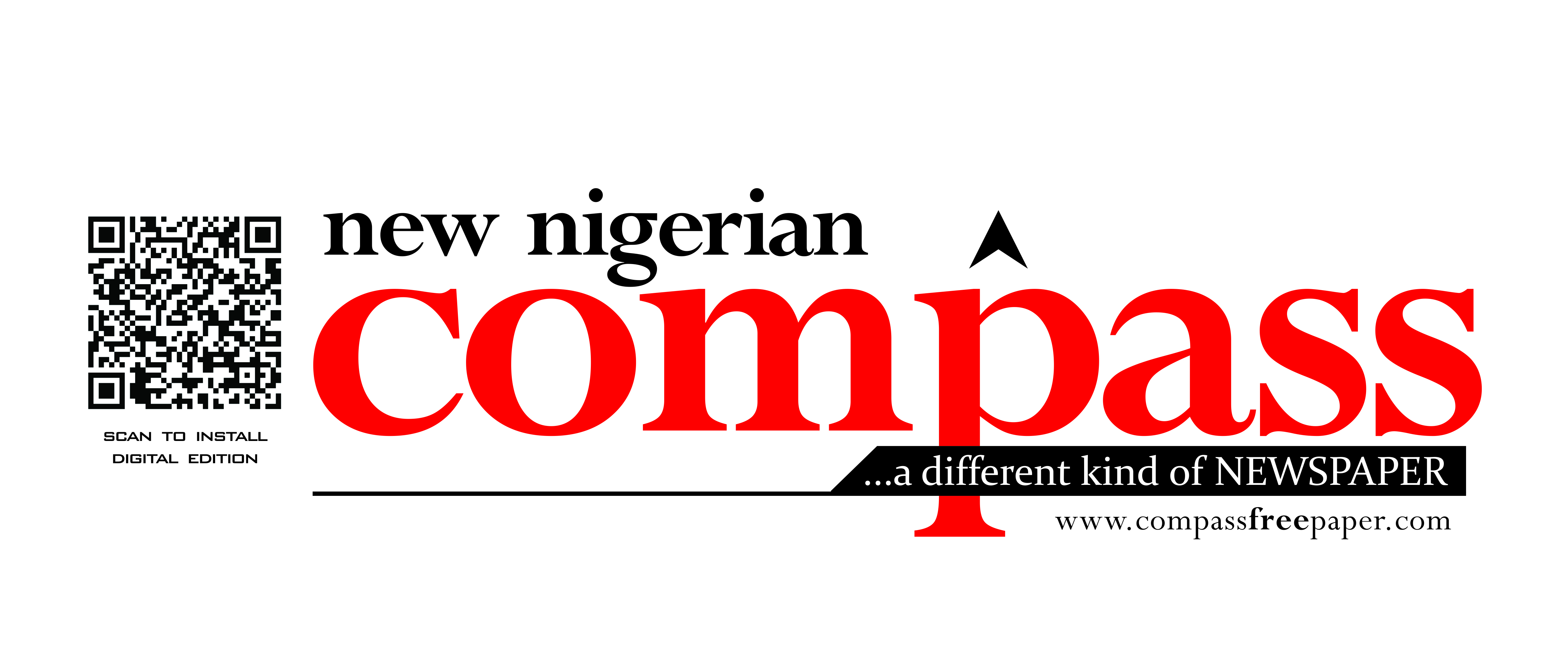
- Type: Daily newspaper
- Founded: 2008
- Language: English
- Website: compassnewspaper.com.ng

The Nigerian Compass is a daily newspaper with National circulation in Nigeria, covering news, business, politics and sports. The paper has weekday and weekend editions.

The Compass is owned by Gbenga Daniel, Governor of Ogun State from May 2003 to May 2011. In June 2009 the newspaper named Daniel the most outstanding governor in education in the country. The award to the paper's owner drew both criticism and ridicule. In July 2009 the paper published a photograph of Wale Alausa, a member of the Ogun State House of Assembly, taking an oath of loyalty while naked. Conflicting explanations were given about the event and the publication of the picture, which seemed to have political motivations. In December 2010 Femi Shodunke, the deputy editor of the Nigerian Compass, was waylaid by four gunmen in Abeokuta, the Ogun State capital. He narrowly escaped with his life.

In February 2011 Chief Akintola Adeniyi (SAN), an Ibadan-based lawyer, launched a N50 billion libel suit against several individuals as well as the Nigerian Compass and the paper's Daily Editor, Mr Gabriel Akinadewo. The suit said the newspaper had reproduced libelous remarks made by the main target of the suit, Otunba Sunday Ojo Williams. After TheNews published a highly critical story on Daniel's eight-year governorship, Daniel responded angrily. He accused the weekly news magazine of having collaborated with Bola Ahmed Tinubu on the story. In their riposte on 17 March 2011, TheNews asserted the independence of their newspaper, saying "... we can only be bemused by the unfounded claims that our stories are being teleguided externally. The governor apparently does that with his Nigerian Compass. We concede that right to him".

In January 2014, the Nigerian Compass announced the acquisition of its publication right by Segun Oyebolu who had earlier made an offer of N1 Billion to Mr Daniel in 2012. The newspaper subsequently is published as a free national newspaper in Nigeria by the newly registered Compass FreePaper Limited owned by Segun Oyebolu.
