= Urhobo Vanguard =

Nigerian newspaper

- Type: Weekly newspaper
- Format: Broadsheet
- Publisher: Urhobo Vanguard Publications Ltd
- Founded: 2012
- Headquarters: Warri & Abuja
- Circulation: 5,000 Daily
- Website: http://www.urhobovanguard.com

Urhobo Vanguard is a Nigerian newspaper. It is the flagship newspaper of Urhobo Vanguard Publishing Ltd and was first published on 21 January 2012. It has its headquarters in Warri, Delta, and Abuja.

As of 2013, it has a circulation of 5,000 copies, a wide reach in Delta State for the print version, and a worldwide reach for the online version. It has a printing plant, in Warri. The paper is noted in Delta State for its color printing, which makes the paper stand out amongst other regional papers.
