= The Nigeria Standard =

Nigerian newspaper in Plateau State

- Truth Exalts a Nation
- Type: Daily newspaper
- Owner: Plateau State government
- Publisher: Plateau Publishing Corporation
- Editor-in-chief: Jonathan Ishiaku
- Editor: Paul Jatau
- Founded: 1972; 54 years ago
- Ceased publication: 1986
- Relaunched: 1992
- Language: English
- Headquarters: Jos, Plateau State
- Country: Nigeria
- Circulation: 6,000
- OCLC number: 29252979
- Website: thenigeriastandard.news

The Nigeria Standard is a daily Nigerian newspaper owned by the Plateau State government and published by Plateau Publishing Corporation, with headquarters at Jos.

== Profile ==
The newspaper was established in 1972 by the Benue-Plateau State government and ceased publication in 1986. Later, in 1992, it was re-established.

The newspaper is one among the oldest news lines in Nigeria, with more than 40 years of being established. The two states—Benue and Plateau—carried out plan to re-establish the newspaper, with more than 400 million naira spent for its renovation and the acquisition of printing machines, vehicles, and the building of other branch office in Abuja, Kaduna State.
