= The Informant247 =

Nigerian digital news platform

- Website type: News, entertainment, politics
- Available in: English
- Founded: 2017; 9 years ago
- Headquarters: Ilorin, Kwara State, Nigeria
- Area served: Nigeria
- Founder: Salihu Shola Taofeek
- Editor: Salihu Ayatullahi (Editor-in-Chief)
- Website: theinformant247.com
- Registration: None
- Launched: 2017
- Current status: Active
- Written in: HTML, CSS, JavaScript

The Informant247 is an independent online newspaper based in Kwara State, Nigeria. Launched in August 2017. The Informant247 newspaper is characterised by covering political news across Nigeria.

== Offerings ==
In January 2022, the medium launched its foundation, The Informant247 Foundation, aimed to enable undergraduate students with passion for journalism develop their skills and improve their performance in the field of communication and media industry.

The medium organises an essay competition to test the creative writing abilities of undergraduates and encourage campus journalism in Nigeria. In a campaign to combat the increasing spread of fake news in the country, the Kwara-based online newspaper launched a fact-checking platform.
