= Dele Olojede =

Nigerian journalist (born 1961)

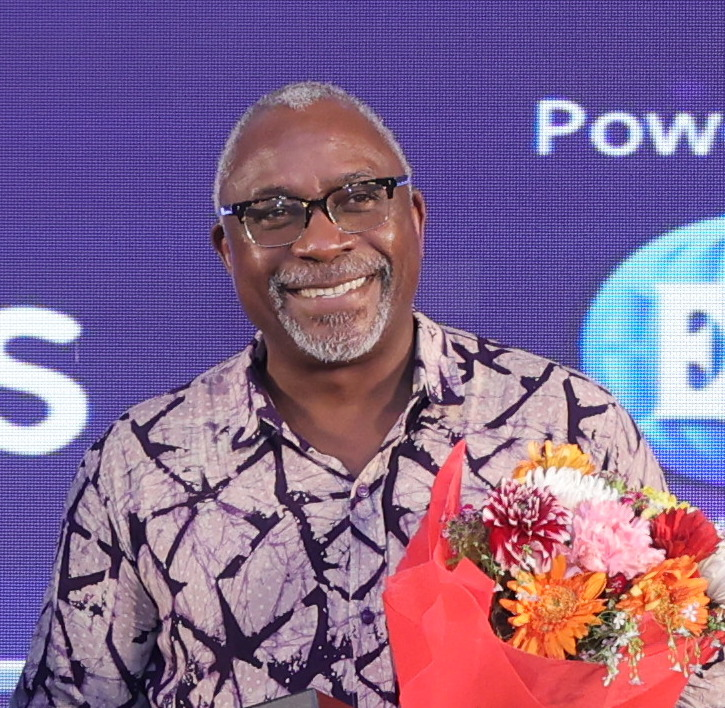
- Born: 1961 (age 64–65); Modakeke, Nigeria
- Education: University of Lagos; Columbia University (MA)
- Occupations: Journalist and former foreign editor for Newsday
- Writing career
- Language: English
- Notable awards: Pulitzer Prize

Dele Olojede (born 1961) is a Nigerian journalist and former foreign editor for Newsday. He is the first African-born winner of the Pulitzer Prize in International Journalism for his work covering the aftermath of the Rwandan genocide. He serves on the board of EARTH University, in Costa Rica, and of The Markup, the New York-based investigative journalism organization focused on the impact of large tech platforms and their potential for human manipulation. He is the founder and host of Africa In the World, a hearts and minds festival held annually in Stellenbosch, in the Cape winelands of South Africa. He was a patron of the Etisalat Prize for Literature.

== Biography ==
Olojede was born in January 1961 in Modakeke, Nigeria. He was the 12th of 28 children. In 1982, he began his journalism career at the National Concord in Lagos, a newspaper owned by aspiring political figure Moshood Abiola. Olojede left the paper in 1984 after he became concerned that Abiola was using the paper to advance his personal political ambitions.

Olojede enrolled at the University of Lagos, where he studied journalism, and became a leader of the students' union movement. As a student, he was particularly influenced by Nigerian literary luminaries such as Chinua Achebe, Wole Soyinka and Cyprian Ekwensi, and other African writers including Ngũgĩ wa Thiong'o. Olojede also acted in Shakespeare plays in grade school and dabbled in poetry in Yoruba and English.

Olojede became one of the founding staff writers of a Nigerian news magazine called Newswatch in 1984. The magazine was edited by Dele Giwa, a well-known Nigerian journalist, who was killed by a mail bomb on 19 October 1986. Olojede publicly accused Nigeria's military leader Ibrahim Babangida of being responsible for the murder. In 2001, eight years after leaving power, Babangida refused to testify before a human rights court about the murder.

A 1986 investigative report by Olojede on the imprisonment of the popular Nigerian musician Fela Kuti led to Kuti's release and the dismissal of the judge who imprisoned him. In 1987, Olojede's efforts earned him a US$26,000 Ford Foundation Scholars grant, which he used to get a master's degree at Columbia University. At Columbia, he won the Henry N. Taylor Award for outstanding foreign student. Olojede eventually became a US-Nigeria dual citizen.

== Newsday ==
On 6 June 1988, Olojede joined Newsday, the Long Island-based newspaper, first as a summer intern and later as a reporter covering local news, including a stint in the Hamptons, on the East End of Long Island. He eventually became United Nations Correspondent, a perch from which he began to cover Africa, making several extended trips to the continent. He was subsequently named Africa Correspondent, based in Johannesburg, South Africa, following the release of Nelson Mandela from prison.

Olojede later worked as a correspondent in China from 1996 to 1999, after being named Asia Bureau Chief, based in Beijing. His reporting took him to all but a handful of Asia countries. Following his assignment in Asia, he returned to Long Island, where he became foreign editor of Newsday. In January 2004, Olojede took an opportunity to return to Africa as a correspondent to write about the 1994 Rwandan genocide, ten years later.

In April 1994, when the genocide broke out in Rwanda, Olojede had been covering the South African general elections, the first free elections at the end of apartheid. He has said that, while the South Africa story was important, he has often wondered whether he could have helped the situation in Rwanda had he gone there instead.

Olojede's 2004 series on the aftermath of the Rwandan genocide was well received. One story that drew particular attention was "Genocide's Child", about a mother who was raising a son conceived during a gang rape during the war.

In 2005, Olojede won the Pulitzer Prize for International Reporting for his "fresh, haunting look at Rwanda a decade after rape and genocidal slaughter had ravaged the Tutsi tribe". The series was viewed as a major accomplishment for black journalists. Olojede was assisted by African-American photographer J. Conrad Williams, and much of the series was edited by Lonnie Isabel, another African-American journalist, who was the assistant managing editor for national and foreign coverage.

By the time Olojede won the Pulitzer, he had already left Newsday. The Tribune Company had purchased Newsday from its previous owners in 2000, and by 2004 were trying to trim costs. At the end of 2004, Newsday offered a round of buyouts. On 10 December 2004, Olojede took the buyout and moved to Johannesburg, where he was living when he learned he had won the Pulitzer Prize.

== Back to Africa ==
As of 2006, Olojede was living in Johannesburg with his wife and two daughters. In November 2006, the East African Standard reported that Olojede was hoping to launch a daily newspaper that would be distributed across the entire African continent.

=== NEXT ===
Returning to Nigeria, Olojede launched NEXT in 2008, first on Twitter and then online and in print. Hiring 80 new journalists fresh out of college and working out of a diesel-powered 24-hour newsroom, NEXT worked to expose government corruption in the face of much resistance. Most famously, NEXT published the story that the president Umaru Yar'Adua was brain dead and not "returning soon from a Saudi hospital" as promised.

In 2011, Dele Olojede won the John P. McNulty Prize, which was established by Fellows of the Aspen Institute to reward the most innovative projects driving social change. The prize was awarded for Olojede's vision and efforts in creating NEXT in Nigeria.

Under Olojede, NEXT paid its journalists a living wage, opposing the usual local practice of politicians paying journalists and expecting only favourable coverage in return. It scooped many stories of public interest, but found that advertisers would no longer support it. When it collapsed in 2011, it owed its staff more than five months' wages.

== Awards ==
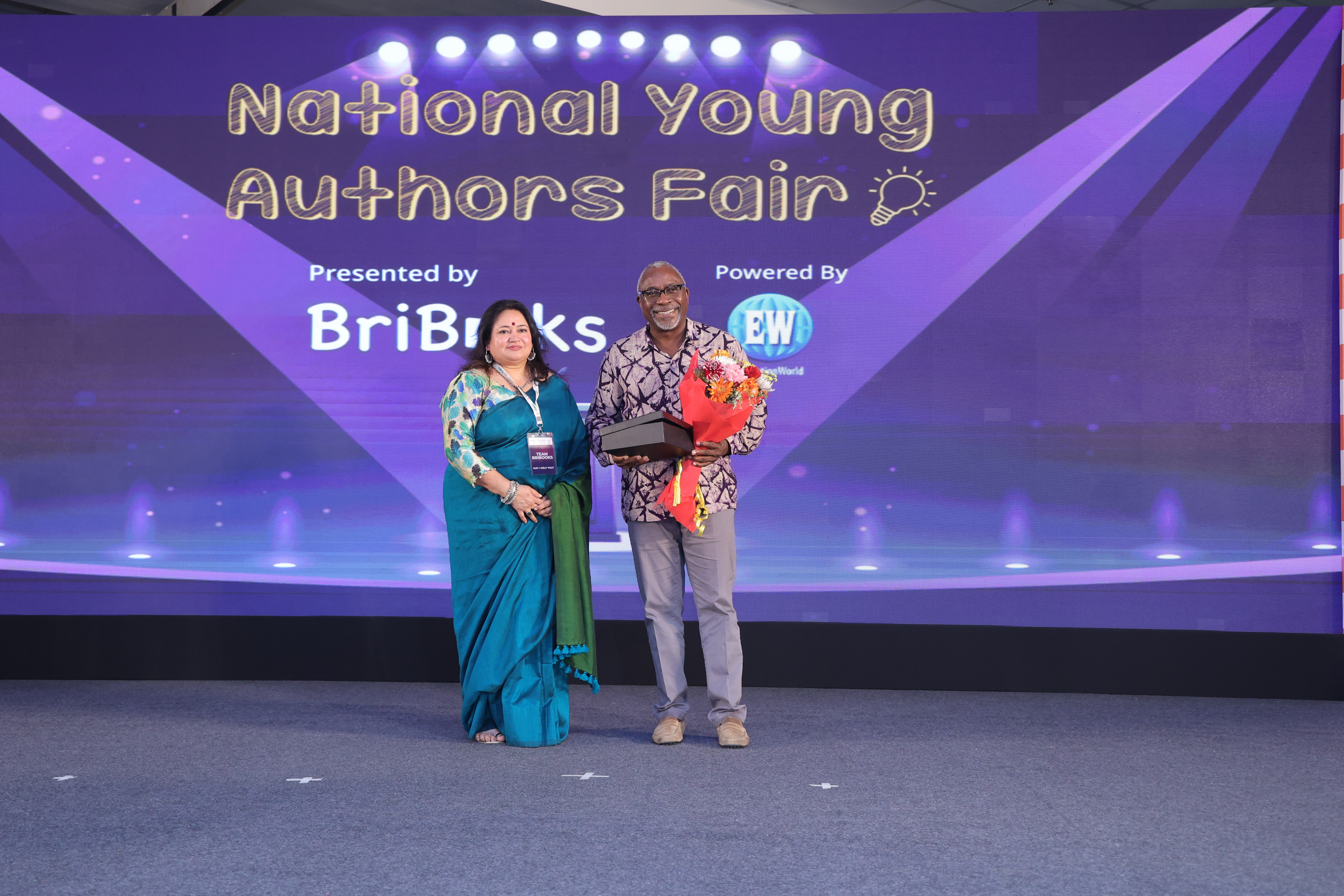
Dele Olojede as Guest of Honor at the National Young Authors fair

In addition to the Pulitzer Prize, Olojede has won several journalism awards.

- 2011: McNulty Prize
- 2010: Prize for Ethical Leadership, World Forum for Ethics in Business
- 2010: 100 Most Creative People, Fast Company
- 2009: Distinguished Alumni Prize, Columbia University in the City of New York
- 1992: Unity Award from Lincoln University
- 1992: Media Award from the Press Club of Long Island
- 1995: Publisher's Award from Newsday
- 1995: Educational Press of America Distinguished Achievement Award for Excellence in Educational Journalism
