= The Will (newspaper) =

Nigerian newspaper

- Expanding the National Conversation
- Type: Weekly newspaper
- Format: Print, digital
- Editor-in-chief: Austyn Ogannah
- Editor: Olaolu Olusina
- Deputy editor: Amos Esele
- Photo editor: Peace Udugba
- Founded: October 2009; 16 years ago
- Political alignment: Centre-left
- Language: English
- Headquarters: San Francisco, California; Lagos
- Country: Nigeria
- ISSN: 2756-5610
- Website: Official Website

The Will is a Nigerian weekly newspaper. It was founded in October 2009 by Austyn Ogannah. It was first published in San Francisco, California before expanding operations into Nigeria. The newspaper, a Nigerian-focused publication, covers general news, politics, business, arts, sports, interviews and current affairs. The Will is published by The Will News Media.

== Content and editorial stance ==
The Will's mission is to improve good governance and advocate for social justice, equity and gender rights. The editorial stance of The Will is centre-left. Its editorial piece and cover story, published weekly, focuses on critical issues around governance and accountability. The paper features a broad mix of news and carries mainly Nigeria-focused coverage of politics, society and entertainment; sports; tributes; business; opinion; special publications (state of the state); features and editorial. The newspaper is published in two formats: printed as a weekly and an online version which is continuously updated.

== Magazine ==
The Will Downtown magazine was established in 2021 and is a sister publication of The Will newspaper. It is a weekly lifestyle- and culture-focused insert magazine with interviews and articles about fashion, lifestyle, beauty and wellness. Downtown articles tend to be dominated by pictures and images rather than long-form journalism, unlike its parent newspaper, The Will. Downtown magazine has studios in Lagos, Nigeria and Beverly Hills, California.
