= Ntel (company) =

ntel
- Formerly: Nitel
- Type: Public
- Traded as: ntel
- Industry: Telecommunications
- Founded: 2016; 10 years ago
- Headquarters: Lagos, Nigeria
- Area served: Nigeria
- Key people: Theophilus Danjuma (Non-Executive chairman); Soji Maurice-Diya (CEO)
- Products: GSM-related products Internet services
- Website: www.ntel.com.ng

NatCom Development and Investment Limited, trading as ntel, is a Nigerian multinational telecommunications company founded in 2016, following its acquisition of the core telecommunications assets of the former Nigerian Telecommunications Limited (NITEL) and its mobile subsidiary, Mobile Telecommunications Limited (MTEL).

== History ==
In 2015, NatCom Development and Investment Limited, acquired the core telecommunications assets of the Nigerian Telecommunications Limited (NITEL). On 8 April 2016, NatCom commenced operations under the ntel brand in Lagos and Abuja, providing fourth-generation Long-Term Evolution (4G LTE) telecommunications services. The company expanded its operations to Port Harcourt on 1 December 2016.

Prior to ntel’s official launch, Kamar Abass joined the board of NatCom in 2015 and was subsequently appointed chief executive officer of ntel. He served in the position until 2017, when Abhulime Ehiagwina succeeded him as acting chief executive officer and managing director in 2017.

In 2018, Ernest Akinola was appointed chief executive officer, a position he held until 2023. Upon his return to Nigeria, Adrian Wood was appointed chief executive officer on 18 June 2024.

On 27 October 2025, Soji Maurice-Diya was appointed managing director and chief executive officer of ntel. He subsequently announced plans for the company to re-enter Nigeria’s telecommunications market during the first quarter of 2026.

=== 2025 – present: Restructuring and relaunch ===
In 2026, the Asset Management Corporation of Nigeria (AMCON) announced that it had commenced a structured divestment process for its interests in ntel and its parent company, NatCom. AMCON stated that the company had undergone a three-part restructuring programme intended to improve its operational competitiveness, long-term sustainability and attractiveness to strategic investors. The proposed sale formed part of AMCON’s broader strategy to recover value from distressed assets and transfer the telecommunications company to new investors.

In July 2026, ntel unveiled The Next Frontier, a restructuring strategy under which its operations were organized into three business entities: Beam Digital, focused on telecommunications connectivity and digital services; Titan InfraCo, established to manage and commercialise the company’s telecommunications infrastructure, including fibre-optic networks, towers and power assets; and Eden Real Estate, responsible for managing and developing its property portfolio. Collectively known as the BET Agenda, the restructuring marked ntel’s transition from a conventional mobile network operator into an integrated connectivity, digital infrastructure and real-estate enterprise.
