= NITEL (Nigerian company) =

Nigerian telecommunication company

- Formerly: Nitel
- Headquarters: Abuja, FCT, Nigeria
- Key people: Abubakar Nahuce (Director General)

Nigerian Telecommunications Limited (NITEL), was a monopoly telephone service provider in Nigeria until 1992 when the Nigerian government enacted the Nigerian Communications Commission act allowing new entrants into the telecommunications sector. During and after its years of monopoly, the performance of the firm was sub-par, a behavior similar to other state owned enterprises such as NEPA and government-owned water corporations. The firm was formed in 1985 as the welding together of two government entities, the telecoms arm of the Post and Telecommunications (P&T) department under the Ministry of Communications and the Nigerian External Communications (NET).

A February 2008 report by the BBC revealed that the Nigerian government assumed the transnational corporation did not improve performance of NITEL and therefore stopped privatization in favour of Transcorp. In 2015, the government eventually finalized a transaction that saw NITEL and Mtel's assets handed over to NATCOM. The deal was valued at $252 million.

In 2015, NITEL formally ceased operations, with its assets and telecommunications business subsequently taken over by Ntel.

== History ==
=== Post and Telecommunications Department (P&T) ===
During colonial rule and until 1985, the Post and Telecommunications department provided mailing and internal telecommunication services between Nigerian cities while NET provided telecommunications services between selected Nigerian cities and foreign countries. Due to resource constraints, provision of services were planned in phases with expansion more pronounced between the 1950s and 1970s.

Telegraph services began in the 1880s and was initially managed by the Public Works Department until 1907 when those services were transferred to P & T. In 1908, a manual telephone exchange with a magneto switchboard of 100 lines was introduced in Lagos and by 1920 the estimate of telephone lines in the country was 920, at 920. A year later, a multiple switchboard was introduced with a capacity for 800 lines and in 1941 a point to point connection with a teleprinter was introduced. In the 1950s, planned investments were launched that included expanding automatic telephone exchanges and trunk circuits, launching a Lagos to Port Harcourt microwave radio transmission route and introducing V.H.F. multi-channel radio transmission to more cities and towns. In 1961, they were more than 32,000 telephones line and 120 telephone exchanges. Investments in telecommunications moved the subscriber base to over 100,000 by 1973 and up to 400,000 by 1990.

=== Nigerian External Telecommunications ===
The history of NET can be traced to colonial rule towards the end of the nineteenth century. In 1886, a telegraph service between Lagos and London was provided by African Direct Telegraph Company, this company later became Imperial and International Communications after a merger and then Cable and Wireless. Upon independence, the government of Nigerian decided to go into a partnership with Cable and Wireless, acquiring interest in the Nigerian arm of Cable and Wireless, and renaming the company Nigerian External Telecommunications. The new firm provided international telephone, telex and telegraph services, high speed data transmission and transmission and reception of real time television but those services were mainly restricted to Lagos and major cities of Nigeria such as Ibadan, Enugu, Kaduna, and Port-Harcourt. The firm's major investment was in building a HF transmission and receiving station.

The firm began providing automatic telex service in 1971 and in 1980, NET introduced international Direct Dialing and faster telex services between Nigeria and select Western countries. NET also offered private leased telegraph services with annual subscription fees to companies and managed television events transmitted or received via satellite such as FESTAC 77 and sporting events. For much of its existence, NET's facilities were inadequate compared to the needs of the business and wider population, man times the lines were congested as available lines on the telephone trunks could not keep up with the traffic.

=== NITEL ===
Nigerian Telecommunications Limited was formed in 1985 as the combination of the telecommunications division of Post and Telecommunications and NET. The new company was formed to improve coordination of telecommunication services within the country, to make internal communications more commercial in objective and to reduce duplication of budgetary allocations and investments. NITEL inherited mostly analogue infrastructure from its predecessors and had to fund new investments in digital infrastructures. It introduced mobile telephony in 1992, through MTS, a partnership with Digital Communications Limited, an Atlanta-based firm. However, operationally, it was still inefficient, the lines were congested, the billing system was inefficient and the call completion rate for long-distance calls was below 50%. When new private telephone services emerged in Lagos during the 1990s, many of them depended on an unreliable NITEL for inter-connectivity services. In addition, demand for services in some cities was much higher than the capacity of NITEL while many NITEL lines were inoperative due to lack of maintenance of infrastructure or inadequate supporting cable network infrastructure.

In 2002, MTEL which had acquired the assets of MTS, obtained a GSM license.

Beginning in 2001, the company went through a period of botched sales and divestment, the first was the proposed sale of 51% stake to a group of investors under the trading name of Investors International London limited, the sale was cancelled after the investors failed to make the final bid price. Subsequently, the government stopped capital investment in the firm and approved a management turnaround contract with a firm called Pentascope in 2003. The contract was cancelled in 2005 after it became clear Pentascope did not have the adequate resources to run NITEL. Another failed divestment to Orascom in 2005 followed before the firm was sold to a subsidiary of Transcorp in 2007, but that sale was revoked in 2009. In 2014, the firm was sold to NATCOM, a group of investors led by Tunde Ayeni.

=== nTel ===
nTel
- Type: Subsidiary
- Industry: Telecommunications
- Predecessor: NITEL
- Area served: Nigeria
- Products: Mobile telephony; Broadband; Internet services
- Parent: NATCOM
- Website: ntel.com.ng

On 8 April 2016, NATCOM (trademarked as nTel), began operation in Lagos and Abuja, offering the fourth-generation Long Term Evolution (4G LTE) network service. On 1 December 2016, Ntel began operation in Port Harcourt. Before the official launch of nTel, Kamar Abass joinned the company as board member of NatCom in 2015, and was appointed CEO of nTel, till 2017.

Abhulime Ehiagwina took over as acting CEO and managing director in 2017. In 2018, Ernest Akinola, took over as CEO, till 2023.

On 18 June 2024, Adrian Wood was appointed CEO upon his return to Nigeria. On 27 October 2025, Soji Maurice-Diya, took over and was appointed managing director and chief executive officer of nTel. Soji shares plans for the first quarter of 2026, to re-enter the nation’s telecoms market.
