= Nigeria Union of Journalists =

- Formation: 15 March 1955
- Headquarters: Lagos, Nigeria
- President: Chris Isiguzo
- Website: https://nuj.ng/

Nigeria Union of Journalists (NUJ) is a network of media professionals established to advance the safety and welfare of Nigerian journalists. It is an independent trade organization with no political leaning or ideological disposition. NUJ is founded in the underlying belief that speaking with one voice as a professional body it can push for the interest of its members particularly in the areas of working conditions and rights: freedom of expression, safety, job security and fair remuneration, gender equality, freedom of association, copyright protection and fight against all forms of discrimination and suppression. NUJ organizes and supports campaigns aimed at protecting journalists' rights and strengthening collective agreements.

NUJ was founded on 15 March 1955 in Lagos during Nigeria's struggle for independence from British rule. It is affiliated to the Nigeria Labour Congress. Its membership grew from 3,950 in 1988 to 35,000 in 2005.

== Past presidents ==
- Chris Isiguzo

Another media association established in Nigeria is the Online Media Practitioners Association of Nigeria (OMPAN), a professional organisation of online media practitioners with members spanning across the 36 states and FCT Abuja
