= Next (Nigeria) =

Nigerian English newspaper

- Type: Daily newspaper
- Publisher: Timbuktu Media group
- Founded: 2009
- Sister newspapers: Elan (a fashion glossy), X2 and the website 234NEXT.com.
- Website: 234next.com

Next is a newspaper in Nigeria that was founded by Pulitzer Prize–winning writer Dele Olojede in 2004, covering news, opinion, arts & culture, business and entertainment.

Next is published by Timbuktu Media group, which is based in Lagos, Nigeria, and South Africa and is involved in publishing, printing and broadcasting. Other Timbuktu Media publications are NEXT on Sunday, Elan (a fashion glossy), X2 and the website 234NEXT.com. Olojede is a former staffer on New York's Newsday who won a Pulitzer prize for a report on the Rwandan genocide. He was a co-founder of the Nigerian Newswatch magazine in the mid-1980s.

In an unusual sequence, Next first appeared as a "tweet" on Twitter in December 2008. Two weeks later the website went live, and the print edition first appeared on 4 January 2009. A welcome message from Olojede in the first edition said: "NEXT is launched now to provide news and informed opinion fairly and accurately to the Nigerian public in any land, based on the best judgment of the editors, and in a way that serves the public purpose and is compatible with the demands of an open and democratic society." It went on to say the newspaper would be delivered through a variety of media including print, internet, Twitter, YouTube, Facebook and so on.

In 2011, Dele Olojede was awarded the John P. McNulty Prize for founding NEXT. The McNulty Prize is available to Fellows of the Aspen Institute who have created a project to solve pressing social problems using innovative entrepreneurial techniques.

Next ceased publication in September 2011.
