= Nigerian Daily Sketch =

Nigerian newspaper

Nigerian Daily Sketch is a newspaper published in Ibadan, South West Nigeria with a circulation of 60,000 throughout the country.
