= The Nigerian Observer =

Nigerian daily English newspaper

- ...that the people may know
- Type: Daily newspaper
- Publisher: Bendel Newspapers Company Limited
- Founded: 29 May 1968; 58 years ago
- Language: English
- Headquarters: Benin City, Nigeria
- ISSN: 0331-2674
- Website: nigerianobservernews.com

The Nigerian Observer is a daily newspaper published in Benin City, Edo State, Nigeria. It has been published since 29 May 1968. The publisher, Bendel Newspapers Company Limited, is owned by the Edo State Government.

In 1973, a correspondent for The Nigerian Observer wrote an article about an impending teacher's strike in Rivers State, which was published on Governor Alfred Diete-Spiff's birthday. Taking this as a deliberate insult, Diete-Spiff's aide Ralph Iwowari had the reporter's head publicly shaved and had him beaten with 24 lashes of a cane. At that time, The Nigerian Observer was owned by Bendel State, the predecessor of Edo State. The Rivers State newspaper The Tide did not mention the conflict with the teachers.

During the administration of President Shehu Shagari (1979–83), the newspaper was subject to harassment by the police, with staff being detained and the premises shut, as were other papers belonging to state governments controlled by opposition parties. Early in 1989, worsening economic conditions forced the paper to close for some time. On 22 July 1993, the administration of General Ibrahim Babangida banned The Nigerian Observer, as well as the National Concord, The Punch and the Daily Sketch.

An analysis of The Nigerian Observer and other Nigerian papers published in 1999 noted that it had a relatively small circulation, with only 15% of column inches taken up by advertisements, compared to 50% in a typical North American paper. Many of the ads were government bulletins; low revenue coupled with shortage of newsprint limited coverage of events, and in particular limited investigative reporting.
