= Global Information Network =

Non-profit news organization

Global Information Network

Global Information Network, Ltd. or GIN, incorporated in 1986, is an independent, New York domestic non-profit news organization with an office in New York City that gathers and disseminates news from reporters in the field in Africa. It supplies news, analysis, and features over 300 ethnic and minority newsweeklies nationwide. Its stories have appeared in print, broadcast and web media in the U.S.

Its executive director is Lisa Vives. The mission of the GIN news service is to give information on global issues that are overlooked or under-reported by mainstream media.

The Inter Press Service (IPS), an international newswire made up of journalists, academics, communications experts and specialists in international cooperation, that spotlights the developing world, is a news partner of GIN.

The agency's World Service covers over 150 countries and is produced in English and Spanish, with selected stories translated into eleven languages. The daily output is around 112,000 words. In addition to the news service, it provides a radio service and a columnist service, with columns written by statesmen/women, officials, opposition leaders and opinion-makers. Columnists have included Kofi Annan, the Dalai Lama, Bill Clinton, Mikhail Gorbachev and others. The trustees of the IPS include Boutros Boutros-Ghali (former UN Secretary General), Martti Ahtisaari (former President of Finland), I.K. Gujral (former Prime Minister of India) and Mário Soares (former President of Portugal).

Stories written for GIN have been picked up by IPS, and have been featured as lead articles on the IPS home page (www.ipsnews.net) and been distributed across the world in United Nations journals, radio stations in Latin America, Africa and Asia, and hundreds of international publications.

In addition to its role as news distributor, it produces a weekly Africa News Briefs bulletin and is a monthly host of African roundtable conferences that present human rights journalists honored by organizations such as the Committee to Protect Journalists, PEN, the international writers' organization and The UN Human Rights Committee.
