= Nigerian Tribune =

English-language daily newspaper in Nigeria

- Type: Daily newspaper
- Format: Tabloid
- Publisher: African Newspapers of Nigeria PLC
- Editor-in-chief: Edward Dickson
- Founded: 1949
- Language: English
- Headquarters: Ibadan, Nigeria
- Website: tribuneonlineng.com

The Nigerian Tribune is an English-language newspaper published in Ibadan, Nigeria. Established in 1949 by Chief Obafemi Awolowo, it is the oldest privately owned Nigerian newspaper still in circulation.

During the colonial period, the Nigerian Tribune served as a platform for promoting Obafemi Awolowo’s welfare programs and represented the interests of the Yoruba community during a time of ethnic competition. After Nigeria gained independence in the 1960s, while many publications were under government control, privately owned newspapers such as the Nigerian Tribune, The Punch, Vanguard, and The Guardian continued to report on corruption in public and private sectors despite government censorship.

Former military leader Ibrahim Babangida reportedly regarded the Nigerian Tribune as the only newspaper whose editorial columns he considered seriously. The publication was also featured in Leadership Failure and Nigeria's Fading Hopes by Femi Okurounmu, a book that included excerpts from a weekly column published in the Nigerian Tribune between 2004 and 2009. The author reflected on issues such as corruption and leadership challenges that have affected Nigeria’s development.

In December 2008, the Nigerian Tribune experienced a leadership transition when Managing Director and Editor-in-Chief Segun Olatunji, along with Editor Rauf Abiodun, resigned. Mrs. HID Awolowo, Chairperson of African Newspapers of Nigeria Ltd., appointed Sam Adesua as the new Managing Director and Editor-in-Chief, marking an effort to modernize the newspaper and expand its readership beyond its traditional audience.

Further changes were announced in September 2012, with Edward Dickson appointed as Managing Director and Editor-in-Chief, Debo Abdulai as Editor of the Nigerian Tribune, Sina Oladeinde as Editor of the Sunday Tribune, and Lasisi Olagunju as Editor of the Saturday Tribune. The Nigerian Tribune is published by African Newspapers of Nigeria PLC, with Tribune Online serving as its digital edition.
