= Elite advertisement in Nigeria =

Elite advertisements in Nigeria are various forms of personal-leaning print, audio and visual advertisements sponsored by Nigerian social elites to celebrate the achievements of a deceased acquaintance or to congratulate a colleague, family or friend.

== Composition ==
The advertisements are readily seen in the pages of Nigerian dailies, with some ads consuming more than ten pages filled with congratulatory messages to a prominent Nigerian on his birthday, wedding or recent honorary award.

Usually, the obituaries of deceased business people tend to consume the most space. Opinions of this form of ads range from Ken Saro-Wiwa's view that the obituary ads were obnoxious to some readers' view that the ads are merely a form of communication. However, the ads raise questions about the influence in popular opinion and culture of excessive and dominating imagery and text made up of an individual's self-definition of his social and communal achievement and the elite's influence within and beyond their circles. The ads are sometimes seen as an indirect way for elites to augment their status in society. Also it challenges the notion of social responsibility in the Nigerian press

However, there are ethno-regional variations in opinion and disposition towards the social marketing of elites in the country.

== Background ==
In many African countries, a few elites, notably politicians, tend to be prominent actors in the everyday drama that plays out in many Nigerian talk shops, group gatherings, and in front pages of the media; further crowding out space for discussions about practical non-elite involved issues that influence the common man. Sometimes not only do they make the news, they own the media and they are also the news.

The elites within a heterogeneous and stratified Nigerian society then use different mediums to convey traditional solidarity, maintain their social and political influence peddling and socially market themselves as cultural symbols of status, men of influence within their community and reference for power brokering.

== Beginning ==
The roots of the newspaper business in Nigeria can be traced to the middle of the nineteenth century. The primary goal of newspapers then was to influence the literacy rate of the population. Foreign owned newspapers quickly emerged as an avenue for readers to educate themselves and also as a tool for the mercantile traders to read about trade-related ads or to advertise their goods. The success of the early newspapers was linked to the competence of its writers and editors, political appeal, patronage by local administrators and the financial purse of the owners. However, fluctuating subscriber revenues by the 1920s led to a greater dependency on advertisement, with about 50–70% of pages devoted to ads but most of it was related to merchandise goods. By 1943, a strategy to increase revenues led to the introduction of classified ads mostly covering one page. It wasn't until the establishment of two politically inspired newspapers, the West African Pilot in 1937 and the Nigerian Tribune in 1949, did newspapers began to devote more space to personality profiles.

In the 1950s, the Nigerian government established a number of newspapers, television and radio outlets. But access to government patronage in later years and increase in political activity led to an emerging space consuming conspicuous politically-motivated ads in many of the government owned newspapers. By the mid 1980s, a bust in government revenues arose following an oil boom sparked by large increases in the price of oil in the 1970s, the revenues accrued by the government began to precipitate downwards leading to cuts in budgetary subvention to many government owned outlets. The revenue shortfall is believed to have created the impetus for many media operators to court and promote congratulatory and obituaries advertisement in their T.V or radio stations.

In the 1980s, solicitation was sometimes done through field agents who receive a commission of about 5–15% of the paid advert. Rivalry between field agents led to discounts in group messages or ceremonial ads celebrating the crowning of a new communal chief, and some discounts were also extended to paid birthdays or welcoming messages for a new president. In 1989, the Nigerian Daily Times, a government owned newspaper, published an average of seven obituaries daily, with the majority of it devoted to ads taking one quarter of a page. During the same period, the Nigerian Daily Sketch on the other hand, published about two pages of obituary ads.

== Obituary ads ==
The obituary ads are usually of two different kinds. There are ads similar to notices pasted on electric poles about an upcoming event while the other one is the In Memoriam ad which celebrates the life and death of an individual a few months or years after her or his death. The in Memoriam ads focus on acknowledging sources of support during the funeral and life of the deceased, and adds a few genealogical link of kin of the deceased. It also offers a personal view of the communal achievements of the deceased, with a few links to prominent personalities in the career trajectory of the elite.

== Congratulatory ads ==
Congratulatory ads are messages celebrating the birthday of someone of economic or political power. At times, it deals with events on the conferment of an honorary degree or a chieftaincy title and the opening of a new business center. The focal point of the ad is on a certain individual who controls scare resources and the beneficial use of the social or economic capital accrued as a result. It is sometimes dominated by praise or flattering texts about the subject and also it can be a way to advance one's status in the elite community by buying ad space and linking one's name or business with the celebrant on the ad.

== See also ==
- Advertising Regulatory Council of Nigeria
