= BusinessDay (Nigeria) =

Nigerian business newspaper

- Type: Daily newspaper
- Publisher: Frank Aigbogun
- Editor: Tayo Fagbule
- Founded: 2001; 25 years ago
- Language: English
- Headquarters: Lagos, Lagos State, Nigeria
- Website: businessday.ng

BusinessDay, established in 2001, is a daily business newspaper based in Lagos, Nigeria. It is the only Nigerian newspaper with a bureau in Accra, Ghana. It has both daily, Saturday and Sunday titles. It circulates in Nigeria and Ghana.

== Publisher ==
The publisher of BusinessDay, Frank Aigbogun, is a former editor of the Vanguard newspaper. The editor of the daily paper is Tayo Fagbule. Lolade Akinmurele is the deputy editor, supported by several assistant editors. Temi Bamgbose is the online editor, while the editor of the Sunday title is Zebulon Agomuo.

Anthony Osae-Brown, a former editor, was a finalist for Best Business News Story in May 2011, a Diageo Africa Business Reporting Award. Godwin Nnanna, a former assistant editor, has won several international journalism awards including gold and silver medals in UN Foundation Prize for humanitarian and development reporting, and the Elizabeth Neuffer Memorial Prize for written media.

The newspaper worked with PricewaterhouseCoopers on the "Most Respected Company and CEO" survey in 2006. Survey results showed the opinions of Nigerian CEOs. Awards based on the survey were presented in a ceremony in Lagos.
