= List of Nigerian films of 2003 =

This is a list of Nigerian films released in 2003.

== Films ==
Title	Director	Cast	Genre	Notes	Ref
2003
2 Rats	Andy Chukwu	Osita Iheme Chinedu Ikedieze Patience Ozokwor Amaechi Muonagor	Comedy		
Above Death: In God We Trust	Simi Opeoluwa	Pete Edochie Kate Henshaw-Nuttal Genevieve Nnaji Ramsey Nouah Zack Orji	Drama		
Abuja Connection	Adim Williams	Eucharia Anunobi Prince Emeka Ani Chidi Mokeme Clarion Chukwura-Abiola	Action / drama / thriller		
Baby Police	Amayo Uzo Philips	Ijeoma Angel Boniface Okey Billy Boniface Osita Iheme Camilla Mberekpe Okechukwu Obioha Francis Odega Chinwe Owoh	Comedy / drama		
Emotional Crack	Lancelot Imasuen	Ramsey Nouah Dakore Egbuson Stephanie Okereke Emma Ayalogu	Romance	Shot in English Language Released by Remmy Jes Productions Company	
Kasalama: The Slave Merchant	Kenneth Egbuna	Sam Loco Efe Chiwetalu Agu Tom Njemanze Emeka Ani		Shot in English Language Released on VCD by A.J. Films/World Movies Production	
Mission To Africa	Joy Dickson	Olu Jacobs Segun Arinze Gloria Anozie Bruno Jnr	Thriller / drama		
Oil Money	Neville Ossai	Clem Ohameze Chidi Mokeme Chijioke Abagwe Maureen Solomon		Produced by Okwuosa-Hand of God Production	
Osuofia in London	Kingsley Ogoro	Nkem Owoh Francis Odega Mara Ashton Cynthia Okereke || Comedy / Drama			

== See also ==
- List of Nigerian films
