= Adim =

Adim may refer to:

- Adim (mythology), king of Egypt in medieval Islamic mythological tradition
- Adim Williams, Nigerian film director
- Ma'adim Vallis, an outflow channel on Mars
- Ibn al-Adim, a biographer and historian from Aleppo
- A diminished chord, a type of musical triad with root A
