= Chioma Okoye =

Nigerian actress, writer and producer (born 1983)

- Born: 3 July 1983 (age 42); Kaduna, Nigeria
- Citizenship: Nigeria
- Education: History and Strategic Studies, University of Lagos
- Alma mater: University of Lagos
- Occupation: Actress
- Years active: 2002–present
- Parents: Joseph Okoye (father); Okoye Naomi. O (mother)
- Relatives: Pete Edochie (uncle)
- Awards: African Youth Awards, 2007
- Website: www.purpleribbonentertainment.com

Chioma Okoye (born 3 July 1983) is a Nigerian actress, writer and producer from Aguleri-Otu in Anambra East local government area of Anambra State, a state in the southeastern part of Nigeria. Since her Nollywood film debut in 2002, she has appeared in over 100 films. She is the CEO of Purple Ribbon Entertainment.

== Early life ==
Okoye was born in Kaduna where she grew up with her parents and brothers and sisters; Godwin, Sam, Gloria, Christian, and Victoria Okoye. Her mother Okoye Naomi. O and father Joseph Okoye died on 30 April 2013.

== Education ==
Okoye attended Faith Nursery and Primary school, Kaduna state, northwest Nigeria and Christ the King Seminary, Nnobi, Anambra State. She attended the University of Lagos where she studied History and Strategic Studies.

== Career ==
Okoye was introduced to acting by veteran actor Pete Edochie who is her uncle. It all happened when she joined her uncle at a location. She first played a role on No Shaking which she played along with Victor Osuagwu, Sam Loco Efe, and Nothing Spoil with Chinedu Ikedieze, Osita Iheme, and Uche Ogbuagu. She hit the market with her first movie she produced, which is Aso-Ebi Girls. Okoye became more well known after Abuja Connection released in 2003.

== Personal life ==
Chioma's Postpartum struggles left her feeling overwhelmed and isolated. Her Husband's return from Big Brother's show births a turning point.

== Filmography ==
Year	Title	Role	Notes
2003	Slow Poison (Agala)		Drama
2003	Drummer Boy		Directed by Amayo Uzo Philips
2003	No Shaking	Ijeoma	with Chiwetalu Agu, Joy Abuchi
2004	Abuja Connection	Agnes	with Eucharia Anunobi, Prince Emeka Ani
2004	True Romance	Ego	Directed by Chico Ejiro
2005	Too Late		with Ini Edo, Ben Nwosu
2007	Passage of Kings	Nkem	Drama
2007	The Prof and Den-Gun	Biggie	Comedy / Drama
2013	Aso-ebi girl		
2013	The World Richest Family		

== Awards ==
Year	Award	Category	Film	Result
2007	African Youth Awards	Best English/ Best actress		Won
2004	City People awards for Excellence	Best Actress		Won
