= Emeka Nwabueze =

Emeritus Professor of Theatre and Film Studies of University of Nigeria, Nsukka

Emeritus Professor Emeka Nwabueze
- Born: Emeka Patrick Nwabueze; September 23, 1949 (age 77); Umubele village, Awka South LGA, Anambra State
- Occupations: Researcher; Academic; Playwright
- Spouse: Dorothy Chinyere Nwabueze (née Mbonu)
- Children: 5
- Parent(s): Chief John Nweke Nwabueze and Josephine Nwabueze

Academic background
- Education: University of Nigeria, Nsukka; University of Jos; Eastern Michigan University; Bowling Green State University

Academic work
- Institutions: Kano State Institute for Higher Education, Edward Waters College; University of Nigeria, Nsukka

Emeka Patrick Nwabueze is the first Emeritus Professor of Theatre and Film Studies of the University of Nigeria, Nsukka in Enugu State, southeastern part of Nigeria. He is also a former dean of Faculty of Arts and ex- director of African studies of the institution.

== Early life and education ==
Emeka was born on September 23, 1949, into the family of Chief John Nweke Nwabueze and Josephine Nwabueze from Umubele village in Awka South Local Government Area of Anambra State, southeastern region of Nigeria. He attended St. Patrick's School, Awka from (1958–65). He proceeded to Zik's College, Onitsha from (1966–1971) and he got admission into the University of Nigeria, Nsukka in 1971. He graduated in 1975 from the Department of English, with Dramatic Arts as his focus area. In 1977, he obtained a postgraduate diploma in Educational Administration and Planning from the University of Jos. Then, he proceeded to Eastern Michigan University and Bowling Green State University where he earned his master's degree and Doctorate degree respectively.

== Career ==
Emeka started his career in 1978 as a lecturer during his National Youth Service Corps (NYSC) at Kano State Institute for Higher Education, northern Nigeria. During his stay in the United States in late 1983 he was appointed Associate Professor and Chairman of Humanities at Edward Waters College, a four-year tertiary institution in Jacksonville, Florida, U.S.A. Following invitation from his Alma mater, he returned to Nigeria in 1983 and was employed as Lecturer II, promoted Lecturer I in 1985, and Senior Lecturer in 1987 promoted to Professor in 1996 and emeritus professor in 2023.

On June 30, 2000, he delivered his inaugural lecture titled "In the Spirit of Thespis: The Theatre Arts and National Integration" which traces the various origins of theatre both in Eester scholarship and the traditional societies, the evolution of theatre as an academic discipline in Nigerian universities, its continuous development, the theories of theatrical evolution, and finally postulating the role of theatre in national integration in a multi-ethnic society like Nigeria.

He was a visiting professor at the University of Swaziland (now Eswatini), and between 1999/2000, he was invited to Randolph-Macon College as Quillian Visiting International Professor. In 2008, he was invited by the University of Trinidad and Tobago as Founding Professor of Theatre; a post he held for three years. He was also a visiting professor at Imo State University in Owerri (the capital city of Imo State), Alex Ekwueme Federal University and Ndufu Alike, Ikwo.

Also, there have been three Ferstrichts written on him; Theatre and New Horizons: The Theatre of Emeka Nwabueze edited by Uche Nwaozuzu in 2011. The second is The Lion on the Ijele Dance: The plays of Emeka Nwabueze, a collection of more than forty essays edited by Ngozi Anyachonkeya in 2015. The last is titled In Our Own Words: The Colossal Strides of Emeka Nwabueze, with more than forty two essays, edited by Uche Nwaozuzu, Canice Nwosu and Emeka Aniagor in 2021 with a public presentation by the Vice-Chancellor of the University of Nigeria, Nsukka, Prof. Charles Igwe, during the 50th Convocation ceremony of the university where he made the following remarks;

Your avalanche of contributions to humanity's development is well-recognized and highly regarded. You are the beacons of excellence and human advancement in our time.

— Prof. Charles Igwe, Nwabueze emerges UNN's first Emeritus Professor of Theatre Arts, Vanguard (Nigeria)

== Research contributions ==
Nwabueze researched deeply on masquerade drama. From his naming it as the quintessence of ritual drama, through his significant work on Igbo masquerade drama and the origins of Theatre where he sees significant commonalities and his conception of the Igbo masquerader as transcendent hero, to his conclusion that the masquerade performances fulfills the required accoutrements of theatre, there is that pungent analyses that traces the performance aesthetics of the masquerade drama through the application of the traditional dramatic elements. While researcher believed that the masquerade performance is bereft of narrative, Nwabueze was the first researcher to introduce conventional narrative propensities in the masquerade drama and demonstrated it through an in-depth application of the Awka Agaba performance. His research on the masquerade drama had been variously cited by scholars in the area and constitute the standpoint on which masquerade drama is evaluated.

Also, in his critical analysis of African fiction, Nwabueze made a significant incursion into the subject of critical dualism. In his much publicized essay, "Theoretical Construction and Constructive Theorising on the Execution of Ikemefuna in Achebe's Things Fall Apart: A Study in Critical Dualism" published in the American-based journal, Research in African Literatures, Nwabueze lays bare his contention that from an available analysis look of authorial voice Okonkwo's killing of Ikemefuna should be seen not as an intentional act but a combination of his paternal imago and an ordination by the gods. He contends that all Okonkwo's efforts to avoid the act even by withdrawing the rear, Ikemefuna escaped the executioner's blow and those of other elders and found himself in the rear where Okonkwo had withdrawn to, there was no other course open to Okonkwo than to commit the act. This research has provided scholars with another way of examining the novel.

== Film career ==
Nwabueze's incursion into Nollywood started with behind-the-camera activities like script editing. His ideas were eventually published for the benefit of film makers. An interview he granted entitled, "A good Script is the first step to a good Film" was a welcome material to film makers. In the interview, he said:

The main relationship is that a film is the transformation of the written word into practical reality, an avenue for the transformation of a blueprint into a living image. If you believe in histrionics, the idea of standing out, distributing roles, delivering lines extemporaneously, it may not work effectively unless the person is well trained in the art. We should know that without an adequate script, there would not be an adequate film. A good script is the first step to a good film.

He later detoured into acting to lead by example. His first major acting experience was in the film, My Father's Love produced by Andy Best Electronics and directed by Obi Okoli. He played the role of Elder and acted along with Kenneth Okonkwo, Eucharia Anunobi and Nkiru Sylvanus. In 2005, Nwabueze acted in No More War along with Pete Edochie, Muna Obiekwe and Chiwetalu Agu. His other two major features was in Rising Moon (a 2005 Nigerian drama film directed by Andy Nwakalor) where he played the major role of Igwe with Onyeka Onwenu, Justus Esiri Emeka Ike, before featuring in The Niger Mission with Professor Lazarus Ekwueme, Chiwetalu Agu and other renowned artists to depict the arrival of the CMS mission in Nigeria. Another film worth mentioning is his participation in the filming of his own play, Spokesman for the Oracle which featured Clem Ohameze, Chiwetalu Agu, Rita Edochie and Amaechi Muonagor. In all these films, he emphasized character interpretation, appropriate roleplay and interaction.

== Membership and fellowship ==
In 1993, he was a member of the National Formative Evaluation of Federal Universities Sector Projects by the National Universities Commission and also member of the World Health Organisation team on the use of Drama to curb maternal mortality and Adolescent Pregnancy, in collaboration with the Nigerian Society for Gynaecology and Obstetrics. In 1994, he was given the honour of Honorary Fellow in Writing by University of Iowa International Writing Program. He is also a fellow of the Society for Nigerian Theatre Artists (FSONTA); Association of Nigerian Authors; African Studies Association, USA; National Association of African American Studies.

== Personal life ==
Nwabueze is married to Dorothy Chinyere Nwabueze (née Mbonu) from Osina, Ideato North, Director of Finance at the Bursar Department of the University of Nigeria. They have five children: Bebe and Lulu (twins), Bobby, Mmutaka (married to Ikenna Njoku), and Njideka (married to Tony Oluoha).

== Selected publications ==
=== Selected dramatic works ===
- Guardian of the Cosmos (1990)
- A Dance of the Dead (1991)
- Echoes of Madness (2001)
- A Parliament of Vultures (2003)
- When the arrow rebounds:(a dramatized recreation of Chinua Achebe's Arrow of God) in 2005
- The Dragon's Funeral (2005)
- Lachrymose (2014)
- Rainstorm in the Desert (2018)

=== Selected critical works ===
- Studies in Dramatic Literature
- The Polemics of the Dramatic Text
- A Critical Study of Modern African Drama

== Relevant literature ==
- Ezenwamadu, Nkechi Judith, and Chinyere Theodora Ojiakor. "Proverbs and Postproverbial Stance in Selected Plays of Emeka Nwabueze and Zulu Sofola." Matatu 51, no. 2 (2020): 432–447.
