= Hollywood cinema in the 21st century =

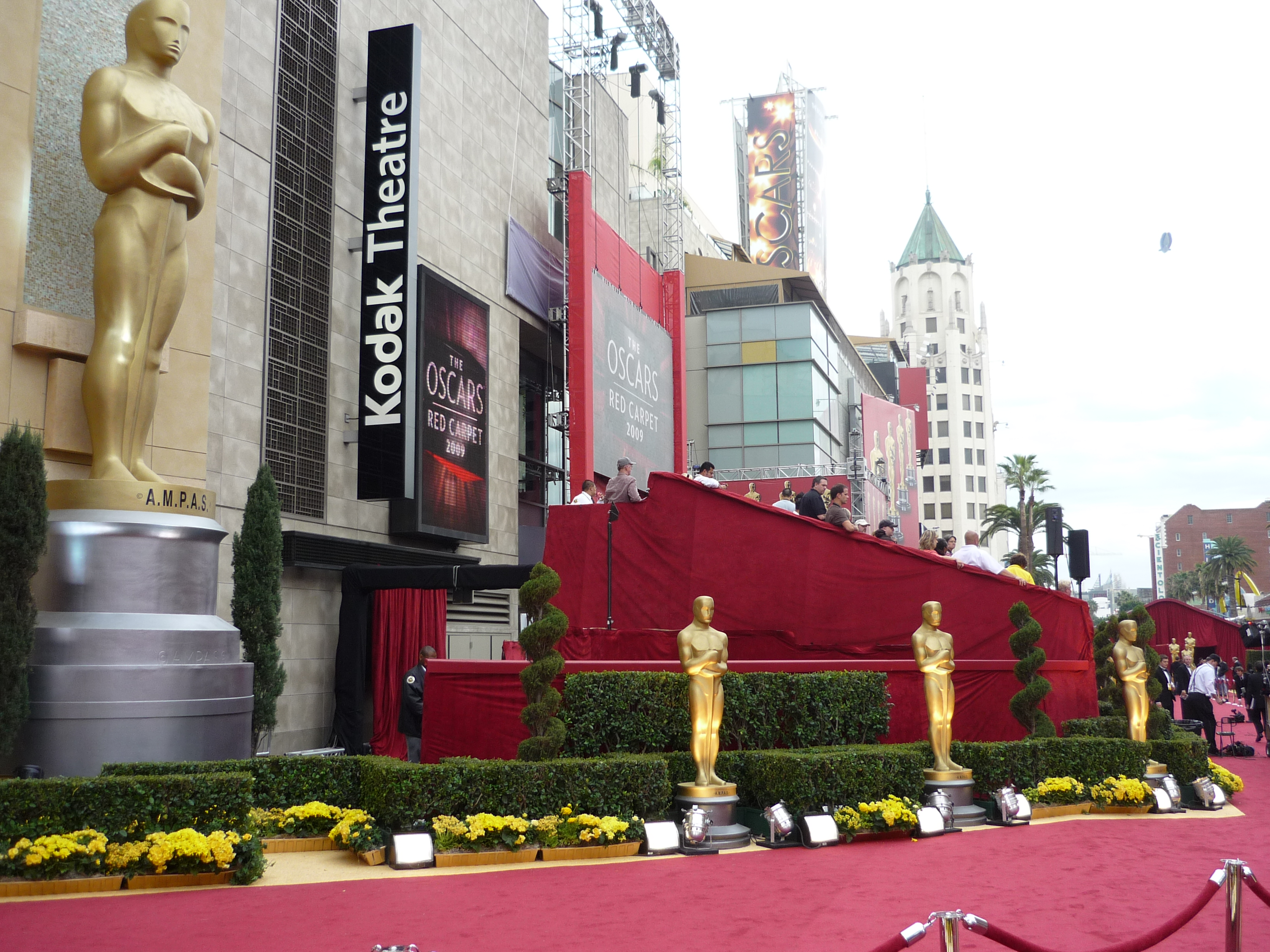
Red carpet at 81st Academy Awards

Hollywood movies refer to the cinema of United States of America. The Hollywood film industry plays a significant role among global movie-making studios and is the third-largest film market in the world.

In the 21st century, Hollywood films are sometimes referred to as "New Hollywood." Beginning in the 2000s, American movies gained a larger international audience and had a greater impact on total box office revenue. Science fiction, fantasy, and animated films have played a crucial role in shaping the global movie industry. Research indicates that, compared to the 20th century, the financial value of films has approximately doubled.

International advertising has been a key factor in the expansion of "New Hollywood" compared to the previous century. A significant portion of box office revenue now comes from overseas audiences.

== Academy Award for Best Picture ==
The Academy Awards are widely regarded as the most prestigious honors in American cinema. Among the Best Picture winners, the highest-grossing film is The Lord of the Rings: The Return of the King (2003), which earned $1.12 billion worldwide.

List of Academy Award for Best Picture films of 21st century by Hollywood
Film	Year
Gladiator	2000
A Beautiful Mind	2001
Chicago	2002
The Lord of the Rings: The Return of the King	2003
Million Dollar Baby	2004
Crash	2005
The Departed	2006
No Country For Old Men	2007
The Hurt Locker	2009
Argo	2012
12 Years a Slave	2013
Birdman	2014
Spotlight	2015
Moonlight	2016
The Shape of Water	2017
Green Book	2018
Parasite	2019
Nomadland	2020
CODA	2021
Everything Everywhere All At Once	2022
Oppenheimer	2023
Anora	2024

== Adventure genre ==
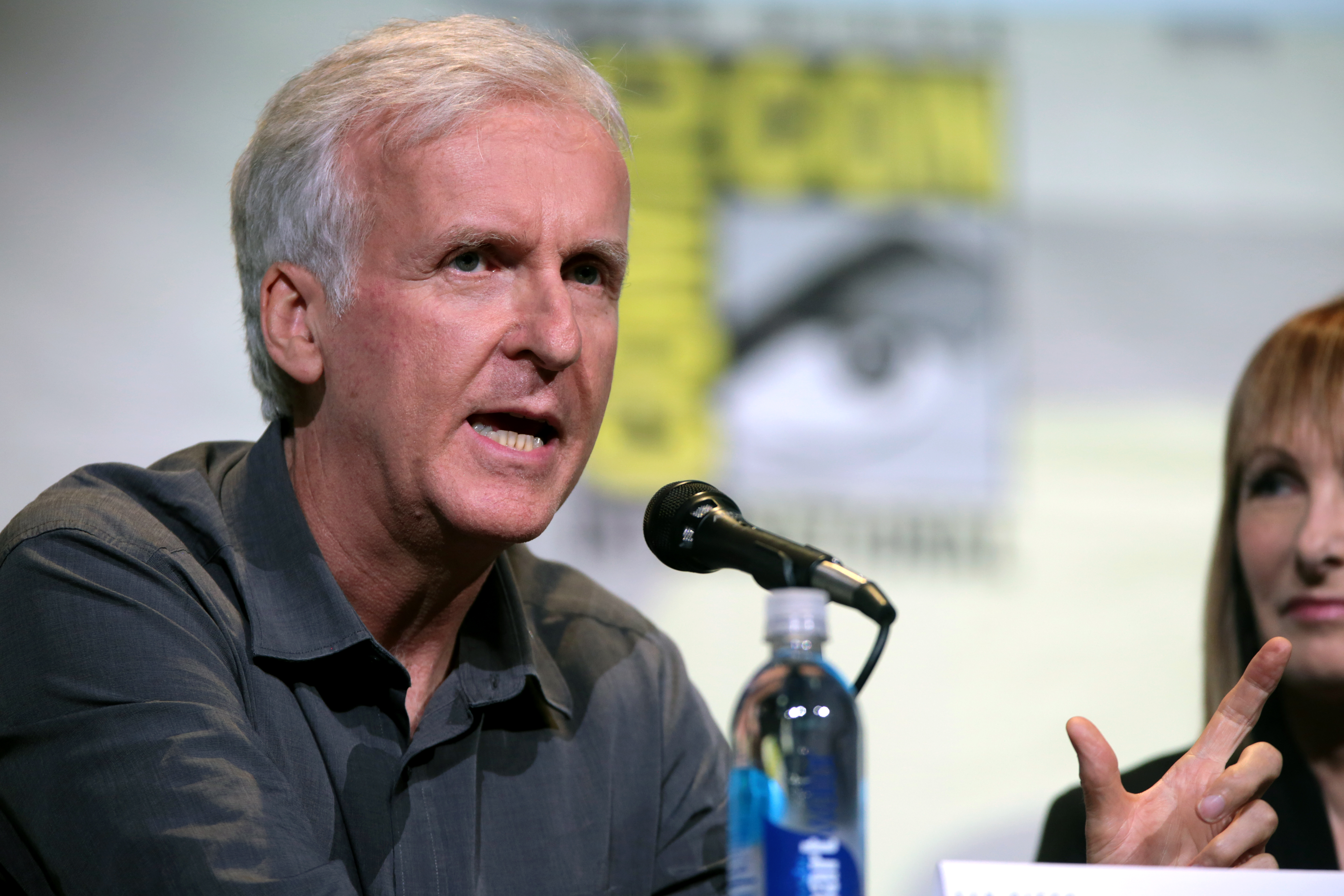
The highest-grossing film of 21st century has been written and directed by James Cameron

Adventure films are among the most commercially successful genres in terms of box office revenue. Since 2009, Avatar has been the highest-grossing film of all time, earning $2.9 billion at the global box office, with 73.1% of its revenue coming from international markets and 26.9% from domestic audiences. The film, directed by James Cameron, was produced by Fox Filmed Entertainment. It had a production budget of $237 million and took 10 years to complete. Avatar won a total of 88 awards, including three Academy Awards for Best Achievement in Cinematography, Best Achievement in Visual Effects, and Best Achievement in Art Direction.

Star Wars: The Force Awakens, an adventure film, is the fifth-highest-grossing movie of all time. It is also the highest-grossing film in the Star Wars franchise, which was created by George Lucas and directed by J. J. Abrams. Released in 2015, The Force Awakens is the seventh episode in the Star Wars saga and the first installment of the sequel trilogy. The franchise is currently owned by LucasFilm, Ltd. and The Walt Disney Company. The film had a production budget of $253 million and grossed approximately $2 billion worldwide, with 45.3% of its revenue coming from domestic box offices and 53.7% from international markets. It won a total of 62 awards, including five Academy Award nominations.

One of the most awarded film series in the adventure genre is J. R. R. Tolkien's The Lord of the Rings (film series). The trilogy received a total of 17 Academy Awards: four for The Lord of the Rings: The Fellowship of the Ring, two for The Lord of the Rings: The Two Towers, and 11 for The Lord of the Rings: The Return of the King. The trilogy had a production budget of $281 million and grossed approximately $2.9 billion worldwide at the box office.

J. K. Rowling`s Wizarding World series is considered the third-highest-grossing film series in the adventure genre, with $8.537 billion in box office revenue (with Harry Potter and the Deathly Hallows – Part 2 being the highest-grossing film in the series). However, the series has never received an Academy Award.

In recent years, animated feature films have become major box office successes, with several surpassing $1 billion worldwide. The most successful animated film is Inside Out 2, produced by The Walt Disney Company, which grossed $1.698 billion globally.

== The other genres ==
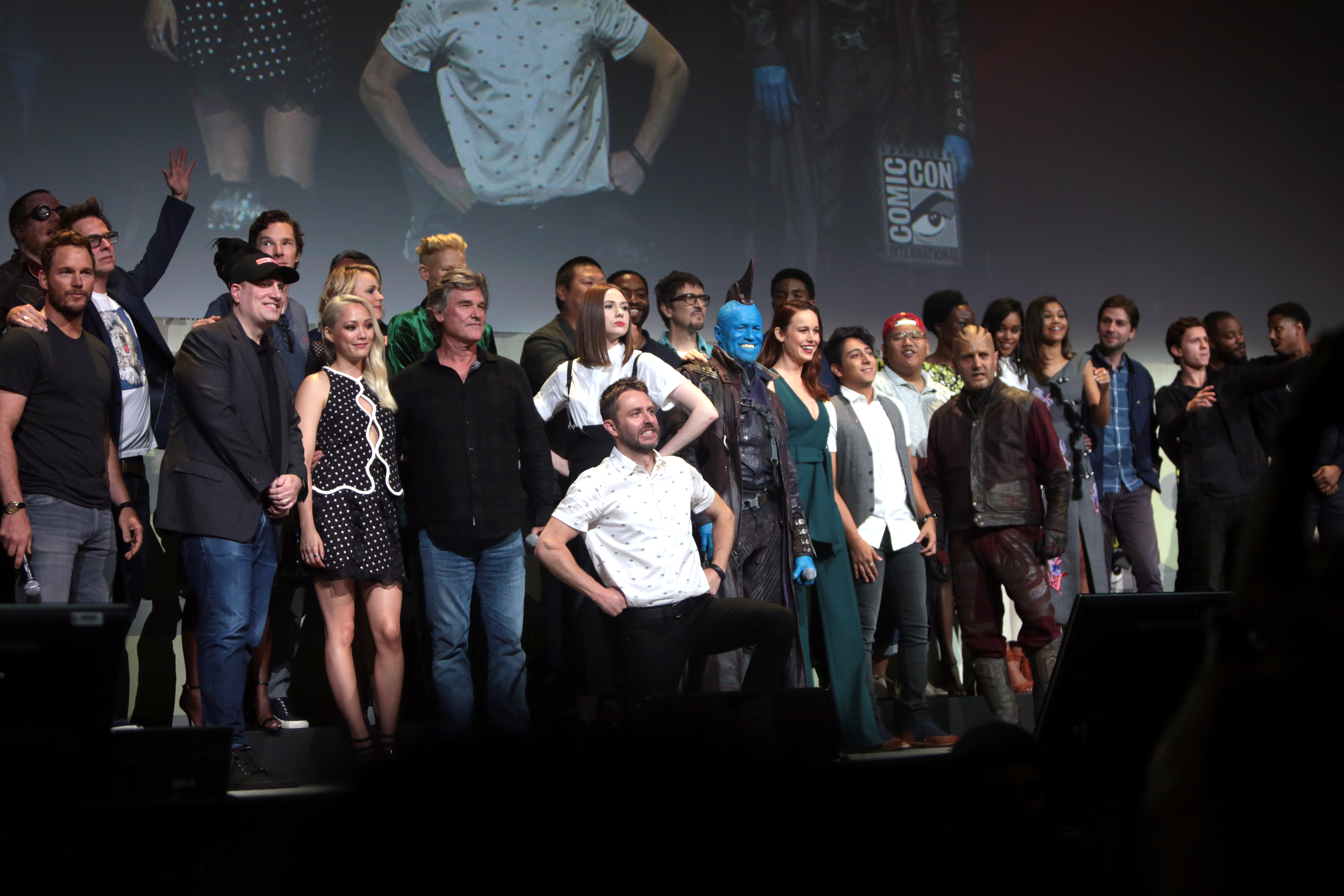
Marvel Studios panelists at the 2016 San Diego Comic-Con

Action movies are the second-most-popular genre in North America in the current century. The Marvel Cinematic Universe (MCU) holds a prominent place within this genre. A total of 35 films have been released, starting with Iron Man (2008 film) and continuing through Captain America: Brave New World. The MCU has earned over $30 billion at the box office.

Avengers: Endgame (2019) is the highest-grossing film in the Marvel Cinematic Universe (MCU) and the second-highest-grossing film of all time, surpassing Avengers: Infinity War. The film earned approximately $2.79 billion worldwide, with $858 million coming from domestic viewers and $1.94 billion from international markets. Avengers: Endgame concluded the Infinity Saga, and it was widely praised for its emotional depth and visual effects.

Comedy is the fourth-highest-grossing genre of the current century. In this genre, The Hangover Part II is considered the highest-grossing comedy film of the 21st century. The film had a production budget of $80 million and grossed $586.5 million worldwide.

The following genre is thriller. Inception (2010), directed by Christopher Nolan, is the most successful Hollywood thriller in terms of worldwide box office revenue, earning $832.4 million. It also won four Academy Awards: Best Achievement in Cinematography, Best Achievement in Sound Mixing, Best Achievement in Sound Editing, and Best Achievement in Visual Effects.

Overall, 57 films have grossed over $1 billion worldwide, with 54 of them produced in the 21st century by the cinema of the United States. Wizarding World films (produced by Warner Bros. Pictures) and Middle-earth films (produced by New Line Cinema and Warner Bros. Pictures) are considered British-American co-productions.

Highest-grossing movies by American Cinema
All-time International Rank	Released in	Movie	Worldwide Box Office	Domestic Box Office	International Box Office
1	2009	Avatar	$2,923,710,708	$785,221,649	$2,138,489,059
2	2019	Avengers: Endgame	$2,799,439,100	$858,373,000	$1,941,066,100
3	2022	Avatar: The Way of Water	$2,320,250,281	$684,075,767	$1,636,174,514
5	2015	Star Wars Ep. VII: The Force Awakens	$2,053,311,220	$936,662,225	$1,116,648,995
6	2018	Avengers: Infinity War	$2,008,425,124	$678,815,482	$1,329,609,642
7	2021	Spider-Man: No Way Home	$1,952,732,181	$814,866,759	$1,137,865,422
9	2024	Inside Out 2	$1,698,863,816	$652,980,194	$1,045,883,622
10	2015	Jurassic World	$1,671,537,444	$653,406,625	$1,018,130,819
11	2019	The Lion King	$1,662,020,819	$543,638,043	$1,118,382,776
12	2012	The Avengers	$1,520,538,536	$623,357,910	$897,180,626
13	2015	Furious 7	$1,515,342,457	$353,007,020	$1,162,335,437
14	2022	Top Gun: Maverick	$1,495,696,292	$718,732,821	$776,963,471
15	2019	Frozen II	$1,453,683,476	$477,373,578	$976,309,898
16	2023	Barbie	$1,447,038,421	$636,238,421	$810,800,000
17	2015	Avengers: Age of Ultron	$1,405,018,048	$459,005,868	$946,012,180
18	2023	The Super Mario Bros. Movie	$1,360,847,665	$574,934,330	$785,913,335
19	2017	Beauty and the Beast	$1,356,081,801	$504,481,165	$851,600,636
20	2018	Black Panther	$1,349,926,083	$700,426,566	$649,499,517
21	2011	Harry Potter and the Deathly Hallows: Part II (British-American)	$1,342,499,744	$381,447,587	$961,052,157
22	2024	Deadpool & Wolverine	$1,338,073,645	$636,745,858	$701,327,787
23	2017	Star Wars The Last Jedi	$1,334,407,706	$620,181,382	$714,226,324
24	2018	Jurassic World: Fallen Kingdom	$1,310,469,037	$417,719,760	$892,749,277
25	2013	Frozen	$1,306,450,154	$400,953,009	$905,497,145
26	2013	Iron Man 3	$1,266,152,644	$409,013,994	$857,138,650
27	2018	Incredibles 2	$1,243,225,667	$608,581,744	$634,643,923
28	2017	The Fate of the Furious	$1,236,009,236	$226,008,385	$1,010,000,851
29	2015	Minions	$1,159,457,503	$336,045,770	$823,411,733
30	2016	Captain America: Civil War	$1,155,046,416	$408,084,349	$746,962,067
31	2018	Aquaman	$1,152,028,393	$335,104,314	$816,924,079
32	2003	The Lord of the Rings: The Return of the King (British-American)	$1,138,283,522	$381,878,219	$756,405,303
33	2019	Spider-Man: Far from Home	$1,132,705,055	$391,283,774	$741,421,281
34	2019	Captain Marvel	$1,131,416,446	$426,829,839	$704,586,607
35	2011	Transformers: Dark of the Moon	$1,123,794,079	$352,390,543	$771,403,536
36	2012	The Dark Knight Rises	$1,114,976,407	$448,149,584	$666,826,823
37	2012	Skyfall	$1,108,594,137	$304,360,277	$804,233,860
38	2014	Transformers: Age of Extinction	$1,104,039,076	$245,439,076	$858,600,000
40	2019	Aladdin	$1,097,831,681	$355,559,216	$742,272,465
41	2019	Joker	$1,078,958,629	$335,477,657	$743,480,972
42	2019	Star Wars: Episode IX - The Rise of Skywalker	$1,077,022,372	$515,202,542	$561,819,830
43	2019	Toy Story 4	$1,073,841,394	$434,038,008	$639,803,386
44	2010	Toy Story 3	$1,067,316,101	$415,004,880	$652,311,221
45	2006	Pirates of the Caribbean: Dead Man's Chest	$1,066,179,747	$423,315,812	$642,863,935
46	2024	Moana 2	$1,059,209,985	$460,351,407	$598,858,578
47	2016	Rogue One: A Star Wars Story	$1,058,684,742	$533,539,991	$525,144,751
48	2011	Pirates of the Caribbean: On Stranger Tides	$1,046,721,266	$241,071,802	$805,649,464
50	2017	Despicable Me 3	$1,034,800,131	$264,624,300	$770,175,831
51	2016	Finding Dory	$1,021,350,883	$486,295,561	$535,055,322
52	2001	Harry Potter and the Sorcerer's Stone (British-American)	$1,026,428,854	$318,886,962	$707,541,892
53	2016	Zootopia	$1,025,521,689	$341,268,248	$684,253,441
54	2010	Alice in Wonderland	$1,025,468,216	$334,191,110	$691,277,106
55	2012	The Hobbit: An Unexpected Journey (British-American)	$1,017,107,150	$303,030,651	$714,076,499
56	2008	The Dark Knight	$1,001,620,618	$533,345,358	$468,275,260
57	2022	Jurassic World: Dominion	$1,001,978,080	$376,851,080	$625,127,000
