= Abuja Connection =

2003 Nigerian thriller film

- Directed by: Michael Ezeanyaeche
- Written by: Michael Ezeanyaeche
- Produced by: Ojiofor Ezeanyaeche
- Starring: Clarion Chukwura-Abiola
- Distributed by: O. J. Productions
- Release date: 2003
- Country: Nigeria
- Language: English

Abuja Connection is a 2003 Nollywood action film thriller directed by Michael Ezeanyaeche and starring Clarion Chukwura-Abiola. There were two other parts, Abuja Connection 2 and Abuja Connection 3, both directed by Adim Williams.

== Plot ==
The film reflects on the struggle for power, money and how having influential connections in Abuja, Nigeria, can bridge the line between poverty and wealth. Jennifer and Sophia are rivals in this game. They happen to belong to the same clan and have inside information of each other's mission. However, Jennifer is far ahead of the game. She always defeats Sophia. Fed up with the humiliation, Sophia decides to stop the rivalry and look for money and power elsewhere. Will she succeed? Or has Jennifer finally won the battle?

== Cast ==
- Emeka Ani as Peter
- Clarion Chukwura-Abiola as Jennifer
- Sandra Ejikeme as Eno
- Eucharia Anunobi as Sophia
- Enebeli Elebuwa as Senator
- Ngozi Ezeonu as Princess
- Chidi Mokeme as Maxwell
- Chioma Okoye as Agnes
- Nneka Onyekwulujeikem as Joan
- Tony Umole as Victor
- Alex Lopez as Doris
- Florence Ogeleka as Rita
- Jude Ezenwa as Olivier
- Miracle Bob-Ekechukwu as Kate
- Tony Goodman as Segun
- Eliel Otote as Reuben
- Oby Edozieh as Carol

== See also ==
- List of Nigerian films of 2003
