= Rising Moon =

- Directed by: Andy Nwakalor
- Starring: Onyeka Onwenu; Justus Esiri; Emeka Nwabueze Akume Akume; Arthur Brooks; Maureen Solomon
- Release date: 2005 (Nigeria)
- Country: Nigeria

Rising Moon is a 2005 Nigerian drama film directed by Andy Nwakalor and starring Onyeka Onwenu. The film received 12 nominations and won 6 awards at the Africa Movie Academy Awards in 2006, including the awards for Best Picture, Best Visual Effects and Best Editing.

== Plot ==
Ulomma is married to Obasi . Having been unable to bear children for a long time, Ulomma faces ridicule and taunts, which prompt the family to bring in a new wife for Obasi. Amidst this family drama, the village's chief priest dies. Seeking spiritual guidance, Ulomma turns to a white Catholic priest and prays for a child, vowing that the child will serve Jesus if her prayer is answered. Meanwhile, Obasi visits the village's traditional shrine and pledges his child's devotion to that deity if his prayer is granted. Eventually, Ulomma becomes pregnant and gives birth to a son, leading to a conflict between the parents who have pledged their child's devotion to different gods.

== Cast ==
- Onyeka Onwenu as Ulomma
- Justus Esiri as Obasi
- Emeka Nwabueze as Igwe
- Akume Akume as Big Ifenna
- Arthur Brooks as Father Benjamin
- Maureen Solomon
- Loveth Ezeanowi as Ugboaku
- Amaka Ife as Chika
- Prince Emeka Ani as Agwuturumbe
- Oninyi Joseph as Obi
- Nzubechi Anele as Catechist 2
- Ezea Iloete Byron as Uche
- Emeka Onah Feddy as Edochia
- Enebeli Hyacinth Ijomah as Ekekwe
- Onunkwo Ikechukwu as Nwaka
- Joy L. Torty as Ukamaka
- Victor Ugwonwu as Catechist 1

== See also ==
- List of Nigerian films of 2005
