= Alex Lopez (actress) =

Brazilian-Nigerian actress and former model

- Born: Alexandra López; 1980 (age 45–46); Jos, Nigeria
- Occupation: Actress
- Years active: 1996–present

Alexandra López, // commonly known as Alex Lopez is a Brazilian-Nigerian actress and former model, who is best known for her controversial starring role as a lesbian in Zeb Ejiro’s 1999 movie Domitila II. In 1993, she was second runner-up in the popular beauty pageant, Most Beautiful Girl in Nigeria.

== Early life ==
López, of Afro-Brazilian, and Nigerian (Igbo) descent, was born in Jos and was trained at Obosi, Anambra state in southeastern Nigeria. She is the second child from a family of five girls and a boy.

== Career ==
López starred in Faruk Lasaki's Changing Faces where she played Franca, the caring Nigerian wife of Dale and a successful white architect. She has also played lead and supporting roles in Nollywood movies like Domitilla, Karishika, Love, Sex & Marriage, Dangerous Girls, Abuja Connection 2&3, Emotional Hazard, The One I Love, Akata, Catastrophe, Jungle Justice, Moving Train, Remarkable Pains, Scout, Sisters On the Run, Six Problem Girls, The Good The Bad And The Terrible and Walls Have Ears. She played a lesbian in Zeb Ejiro's movie Domitilla.

Due to her mixed ethnicity, she is often referred to as "the half-caste Nollywood actress".

== Personal life ==
As of 2011, Lopez was unmarried and had a son. In July 2013, it was reported that López and Slim Burna, the Port Harcourt-based Nigerian singer, were dating. Both responded that they were just friends.

== Filmography ==
Year	Film	Role	Notes
1996	Domitilla		Action / Thriller film Directed by Zeb Ejiro
1998	Karishika		Horror film Also starring Bob-Manuel Udokwu
2001	The Luck of the Irish		
2003	Six Problem Girls		
2003	Moving Train		with Kanayo O. Kanayo
2003	Abuja Connection 2	Doris	
2004	Scout		with Uche Jombo
2004	Abuja Connection 3	Doris	Action / Drama / Thriller film Also starring Eucharia Anunobi Ekwu
2007	Letters to a Stranger	Secretary	
2008	Changing Faces	Franca	Mystery Directed by Faruk Lasaki
