= Film series =

Collection of related films in succession

A film series or movie series is a collection of related films in succession that share the same fictional universe, or are marketed as a series. It is a type of series fiction.

This article explains what film series are and gives brief examples of movie series. The body shows a list of the most popular film series and franchises in the United States and Canada.

== Description ==
Sometimes the work is conceived from the beginning as a multiple-film work—for example, the Three Colours series—but in most cases the success of the original film (or an original series in the case of the Skywalker Saga) inspires further films to be made. Individual sequels are relatively common but are not always successful enough to spawn further installments.

As of 2025, the 37 films of the Marvel Cinematic Universe form the highest-grossing film series even when adjusted for inflation, surpassing J. K. Rowling's Wizarding World (11 films), Star Wars (12 films), Ian Fleming's James Bond (27 films), and J. R. R. Tolkien's Middle-earth (8 films) series.

== Box office ==
† Background shading indicates that at least one film in the series is playing in the week commencing 20 March 2026 in theaters around the world.

Highest-grossing franchises and film series^{[§]}(The films in each franchise can be viewed by selecting "show".)

Rank	Series	Total worldwide gross	No. of films	Average of films	Highest-grossing film

1
Marvel Cinematic Universe^{S}
$32,487,068,924
37
$878,028,890
Avengers: Endgame ($2,797,501,328)

The Infinity Saga	$22,589,262,908	23	$982,141,866	Avengers: Endgame ($2,797,501,328)
/ Phase Three / $13,506,562,880 / 11 / $1,227,869,353 / Avengers: Endgame ($2,797,501,328); 1 / Avengers: Endgame (2019) / $2,797,501,328; 2 / Avengers: Infinity War (2018) / $2,048,359,754; 3 / Black Panther (2018) / $1,347,280,838; 4 / Captain America: Civil War (2016) / $1,153,337,496; 5 / Spider-Man: Far From Home (2019) / $1,132,679,685; 6 / Captain Marvel (2019) / $1,128,274,794; 7 / Spider-Man: Homecoming (2017) / $880,918,840; 8 / Guardians of the Galaxy Vol. 2 (2017) / $863,756,051; 9 / Thor: Ragnarok (2017) / $853,983,879; 10 / Doctor Strange (2016) / $677,796,076; 11 / Ant-Man and the Wasp (2018) / $622,674,139
/ Phase Two / $5,269,487,547 / 6 / $878,247,925 / Avengers: Age of Ultron ($1,402,809,540); 1 / Avengers: Age of Ultron (2015) / $1,402,809,540; 2 / Iron Man 3 (2013) / $1,214,811,252; 3 / Guardians of the Galaxy (2014) / $773,350,147; 4 / Captain America: The Winter Soldier (2014) / $714,421,503; 5 / Thor: The Dark World (2013) / $644,783,140; 6 / Ant-Man (2015) / $519,311,965
/ Phase One / $3,813,212,481 / 6 / $635,535,414 / The Avengers ($1,518,815,515); 1 / The Avengers (2012) / $1,518,815,515; 2 / Iron Man 2 (2010) / $623,933,331; 3 / Iron Man (2008) / $585,796,247; 4 / Thor (2011) / $449,326,618; 5 / Captain America: The First Avenger (2011) / $370,569,774; 6 / The Incredible Hulk (2008) / $264,770,996

The Multiverse Saga	$9,897,806,016	14	$706,986,144	Spider-Man: No Way Home ($1,922,598,800)
/ Phase Four / $5,712,571,367 / 7 / $816,081,624 / Spider-Man: No Way Home ($1,922,598,800); 1 / Spider-Man: No Way Home (2021) / $1,922,598,800; 2 / Doctor Strange in the Multiverse of Madness (2022) / $955,775,804; 3 / Black Panther: Wakanda Forever (2022) / $859,208,836; 4 / Thor: Love and Thunder (2022) / $760,928,081; 5 / Shang-Chi and the Legend of the Ten Rings (2021) / $432,243,292; 6 / Eternals (2021) / $402,064,899; 7 / Black Widow (2021) / $379,751,655
/ Phase Five / $3,663,375,921 / 6 / $610,562,654 / Deadpool & Wolverine ($1,338,073,645); 1 / Deadpool & Wolverine (2024) / $1,338,073,645; 2 / Guardians of the Galaxy Vol. 3 (2023) / $845,555,777; 3 / Ant-Man and the Wasp: Quantumania (2023) / $476,071,180; 4 / Captain America: Brave New World (2025) / $415,101,577; 5 / Thunderbolts* (2025) / $382,436,917; 6 / The Marvels (2023) / $206,136,825
/ Phase Six / $521,858,728 / 1 / $521,858,728 / The Fantastic Four: First Steps ($521,858,728); 1 / The Fantastic Four: First Steps (2025) / $521,858,728

2	Spider-Man	$11,154,092,078	16	$697,130,755	No Way Home ($1,922,598,800)
/ Marvel Cinematic Universe / $3,936,197,325 / 3 / $1,312,065,775 / No Way Home ($1,922,598,800); 1 / No Way Home (2021) / $1,922,598,800; 2 / Far From Home (2019) / $1,132,679,685; 3 / Homecoming (2017) / $880,918,840
/ Raimi series / $2,511,239,929 / 3 / $837,079,976 / Spider-Man 3 ($895,735,062); 1 / Spider-Man 3 (2007) / $895,735,062; 2 / Spider-Man (2002) / $825,776,725; 3 / Spider-Man 2 (2004) / $789,728,142
/ Sony's Spider-Man Universe / $2,171,872,891 / 6 / $361,978,815 / Venom ($856,085,151); 1 / Venom (2018) / $856,085,151; 2 / Venom: Let There Be Carnage (2021) / $506,813,864; 3 / Venom: The Last Dance (2024) / $478,937,618; 4 / Morbius (2022) / $167,460,961; 5 / Madame Web (2024) / $100,498,764; 6 / Kraven the Hunter (2024) / $62,076,533
/ Webb series / $1,468,416,364 / 2 / $734,208,182 / The Amazing Spider-Man ($758,682,352); 1 / The Amazing Spider-Man (2012) / $758,682,352; 2 / The Amazing Spider-Man 2 (2014) / $709,734,012
/ Spider-Verse / $1,066,365,569 / 2 / $533,182,785 / Across the Spider-Verse ($690,824,738); 1 / Across the Spider-Verse (2023) / $690,824,738; 2 / Into the Spider-Verse (2018) / $375,540,831

3	Star Wars	$10,402,926,458	12	$866,910,538	The Force Awakens ($2,068,223,624)
Skywalker Saga / $8,884,298,420 / 9 / $987,144,269 / The Force Awakens ($2,068,223,624); / Sequel trilogy / $4,474,907,761 / 3 / $1,491,635,920 / The Force Awakens ($2,068,223,624); 1 / VII – The Force Awakens (2015) / $2,068,223,624; 2 / VIII – The Last Jedi (2017) / $1,332,539,889; 3 / IX – The Rise of Skywalker (2019) / $1,074,144,248 / Prequel trilogy / $2,601,509,684 / 3 / $867,169,895 / The Phantom Menace ($1,046,515,409); 1 / I – The Phantom Menace (1999) / $1,046,515,409; 2 / III – Revenge of the Sith (2005) / $905,595,947; 3 / II – Attack of the Clones (2002) / $649,398,328 / Original trilogy / $1,807,880,975 / 3 / $602,626,992 / A New Hope ($775,398,507); 1 / IV – A New Hope (1977) / $775,398,507; 2 / V – The Empire Strikes Back (1980) / $550,016,086; 3 / VI – Return of the Jedi (1983) / $482,466,382
/ Standalone films / $1,450,345,194 / 2 / $725,172,597 / Rogue One ($1,057,420,387); 1 / Rogue One (2016) / $1,057,420,387; 2 / Solo (2018) / $392,924,807
The Clone Wars (2008) / $68,282,844

4
Wizarding World
$9,656,055,269
11
$877,823,206
Harry Potter and the Deathly Hallows – Part 2 ($1,342,139,727)

	Harry Potter series	$7,780,010,016	8	$972,501,252	Deathly Hallows – Part 2 ($1,342,139,727)
1	Deathly Hallows – Part 2 (2011)	$1,342,139,727			
2	Philosopher's Stone (2001)	$1,009,046,830			
3	Deathly Hallows – Part 1 (2010)	$977,070,383			
4	Order of the Phoenix (2007)	$942,201,710			
5	Half-Blood Prince (2009)	$934,483,039			
6	Goblet of Fire (2005)	$896,815,106			
7	Chamber of Secrets (2002)	$880,684,614			
8	Prisoner of Azkaban (2004)	$797,568,607			

	Fantastic Beasts series	$1,876,045,253	3	$625,348,418	Fantastic Beasts and Where to Find Them ($814,038,508)
1	Fantastic Beasts and Where to Find Them (2016)	$814,038,508			
2	The Crimes of Grindelwald (2018)	$654,855,901			
3	The Secrets of Dumbledore (2022)	$407,150,844			

5	James Bond	$7,836,510,562	27	$290,241,132	Skyfall ($1,108,594,137)
Eon series / $7,634,765,844 / 25 / $305,390,634 / Skyfall ($1,108,594,137); / Daniel Craig series / $3,969,538,100 / 5 / $793,907,620 / Skyfall ($1,108,594,137); 1 / Skyfall (2012) / $1,108,594,137; 2 / Spectre (2015) / $880,705,312; 3 / No Time to Die (2021) / $774,153,007; 4 / Casino Royale (2006) / $616,505,162; 5 / Quantum of Solace (2008) / $589,580,482 / Pierce Brosnan series / $1,479,008,618 / 4 / $369,752,155 / Die Another Day ($431,971,116); 1 / Die Another Day (2002) / $431,971,116; 2 / The World Is Not Enough (1999) / $361,832,400; 3 / GoldenEye (1995) / $352,194,034; 4 / Tomorrow Never Dies (1997) / $333,011,068 / Roger Moore series / $1,151,600,000 / 7 / $164,514,286 / Moonraker ($210,300,000); 1 / Moonraker (1979) / $210,300,000; 2 / For Your Eyes Only (1981) / $194,900,000; 3 / The Spy Who Loved Me (1977) / $185,400,000; 4 / Octopussy (1983) / $183,700,000; 5 / A View to a Kill (1985) / $152,400,000; 6 / Live and Let Die (1973) / $126,400,000; 7 / The Man with the Golden Gun (1974) / $98,500,000 / Sean Connery series / $621,500,000 / 6 / $103,583,333 / Thunderball ($141,200,000); 1 / Thunderball (1965) / $141,200,000; 2 / Goldfinger (1964) / $124,900,000; 3 / Diamonds Are Forever (1971) / $116,000,000; 4 / You Only Live Twice (1967) / $101,000,000; 5 / From Russia with Love (1963) / $78,900,000; 6 / Dr. No (1962) / $59,500,000 / Timothy Dalton series / $347,400,000 / 2 / $173,700,000 / The Living Daylights ($191,200,000); 1 / The Living Daylights (1987) / $191,200,000; 2 / Licence to Kill (1989) / $156,200,000 / George Lazenby series / $64,600,000 / 1 / $64,600,000 / On Her Majesty's Secret Service ($64,600,000); 1 / On Her Majesty's Secret Service (1969) / $64,600,000
Never Say Never Again (1983) / $160,000,000
Casino Royale (1967) / $41,744,718

6	Avengers	$7,767,486,137	4	$1,941,871,534	Endgame ($2,797,501,328)
1	Endgame (2019)	$2,797,501,328			
2	Infinity War (2018)	$2,048,359,754			
3	The Avengers (2012)	$1,518,815,515			
4	Age of Ultron (2015)	$1,402,809,540			

7	X-Men	$7,422,190,386	14	$530,156,456	Deadpool & Wolverine ($1,338,073,645)
/ Main series / $3,059,525,837 / 7 / $437,075,120 / Days of Future Past ($746,045,700); 1 / Days of Future Past (2014) / $746,045,700; 2 / Apocalypse (2016) / $543,934,105; 3 / The Last Stand (2006) / $460,435,291; 4 / X2 (2003) / $407,711,549; 5 / First Class (2011) / $352,616,690; 6 / X-Men (2000) / $296,339,528; 7 / Dark Phoenix (2019) / $252,442,974
/ Deadpool series / $2,906,582,409 / 3 / $968,860,803 / Deadpool & Wolverine ($1,338,073,645); 1 / Deadpool & Wolverine (2024) / $1,338,073,645; 2 / Deadpool 2 (2018) / $785,896,609; 3 / Deadpool (2016) / $782,612,155
/ Wolverine series / $1,406,912,546 / 3 / $468,970,849 / Logan ($619,021,436); 1 / Logan (2017) / $619,021,436; 2 / The Wolverine (2013) / $414,828,246; 3 / Origins: Wolverine (2009) / $373,062,864
The New Mutants (2020) / $49,169,594

8
Fast & Furious
$7,333,461,998
11
$666,678,363
Furious 7 ($1,515,341,399)

	The Fast Saga	$6,572,729,072	10	$657,272,907	Furious 7 ($1,515,341,399)
1	Furious 7 (2015)	$1,515,341,399			
2	The Fate of the Furious (2017)^{F8}	$1,238,764,765			
3	Fast & Furious 6 (2013)	$788,680,968			
4	F9 (2021)	$726,229,501			
5	Fast X (2023)	$714,375,114			
6	Fast Five (2011)	$626,137,675			
7	Fast & Furious (2009)	$360,366,870			
8	2 Fast 2 Furious (2003)	$236,350,661			
9	The Fast and the Furious (2001)	$207,517,509			
10	Tokyo Drift (2006)	$158,964,610			

Hobbs & Shaw (2019)	$760,732,926

9	DC Extended Universe^{S}	$7,196,680,912	15	$479,778,727	Aquaman ($1,148,528,393)
1	Aquaman (2018)	$1,148,528,393			
2	Batman v Superman: Dawn of Justice (2016)	$873,637,528			
3	Wonder Woman (2017)	$822,854,286			
4	Suicide Squad (2016)	$746,846,894			
5	Man of Steel (2013)	$668,045,518			
6	Justice League (2017)	$657,926,987			
7	Aquaman and the Lost Kingdom (2023)	$439,381,226			
8	Black Adam (2022)	$393,452,111			
9	Shazam! (2019)	$365,971,656			
10	The Flash (2023)	$271,433,313			
11	Birds of Prey (2020)	$205,358,461			
12	Wonder Woman 1984 (2020)	$169,601,036			
13	The Suicide Squad (2021)	$168,717,425			
14	Shazam! Fury of the Gods (2023)	$134,138,006			
15	Blue Beetle (2023)	$130,788,072			

10	Batman	$7,053,037,410	19	$371,212,495	The Dark Knight Rises ($1,081,169,825)
/ The Dark Knight trilogy / $2,463,137,450 / 3 / $821,045,817 / The Dark Knight Rises ($1,081,169,825); 1 / The Dark Knight Rises (2012) / $1,081,169,825; 2 / The Dark Knight (2008) / $1,008,294,632; 3 / Batman Begins (2005) / $373,672,993
/ Joker series / $1,281,958,569 / 2 / $640,979,285 / Joker ($1,074,458,282); 1 / Joker (2019) / $1,074,458,282; 2 / Folie à Deux (2024) / $207,500,287
/ Burton/Schumacher series / $1,253,192,682 / 4 / $313,298,171 / Batman ($411,556,825); 1 / Batman (1989) / $411,556,825; 2 / Batman Forever (1995) / $336,567,531; 3 / Batman Returns (1992) / $266,832,411; 4 / Batman & Robin (1997) / $238,235,915
Batman v Superman: Dawn of Justice (2016) / $873,637,528
The Batman (2022) / $772,319,315
The Lego Batman Movie (2017) / $311,950,384
Catwoman (2004) / $82,102,379
Mask of the Phantasm (1993) / $5,617,391
/ DC Universe Animated Original Movies / $4,501,125 / 2 / $2,250,563 / The Killing Joke ($4,462,034); 1 / The Killing Joke (2016) / $4,462,034; 2 / Batman and Harley Quinn (2017) / $39,091
/ 1960s TV series / $3,957,343 / 2 / $1,978,672 / Batman: The Movie ($3,900,000); 1 / Batman: The Movie (1966)^{*}^{R} / $3,900,000; 2 / Return of the Caped Crusaders (2016) / $57,343
Aztec Batman: Clash of Empires (2025) / $663,244

11
Jurassic Park
$6,878,119,429
7
$982,588,490
Jurassic World ($1,671,537,444)

	Jurassic World series	$4,853,164,391	4	$1,213,291,098	Jurassic World ($1,671,537,444)
1	Jurassic World (2015)	$1,671,537,444			
2	Fallen Kingdom (2018)	$1,308,476,166			
3	Dominion (2022)	$1,004,004,592			
4	Rebirth (2025)	$869,146,189			

	Jurassic Park trilogy	$2,024,955,038	3	$674,985,013	Jurassic Park ($1,037,535,230)
1	Jurassic Park (1993)	$1,037,535,230			
2	The Lost World (1997)	$618,638,999			
3	Jurassic Park III (2001)	$368,780,809			

12	Avatar †	$6,743,466,133	3	$2,247,822,044	Avatar ($2,923,710,708)
1	Avatar (2009)	$2,923,710,708			
2	The Way of Water (2022)	$2,334,484,620			
3	Fire and Ash (2025) †	$1,485,270,805			

13	Middle-earth	$5,978,900,075	8	$747,362,509	The Lord of the Rings: The Return of the King ($1,147,997,407)
Jackson series $5,927,770,083 6 $987,961,681 The Lord of the Rings: The Return of the King ($1,147,997,407): / The Lord of the Rings / $2,995,691,652 / 3 / $998,563,884 / The Return of the King ($1,147,997,407); 1 / The Return of the King (2003) / $1,147,997,407; 2 / The Two Towers (2002) / $948,945,489; 3 / The Fellowship of the Ring (2001) / $898,748,756; / The Hobbit / $2,932,078,431 / 3 / $977,359,477 / An Unexpected Journey ($1,017,030,651); 1 / An Unexpected Journey (2012) / $1,017,030,651; 2 / The Desolation of Smaug (2013) / $959,027,992; 3 / The Battle of the Five Armies (2014) / $956,019,788
The Lord of the Rings (1978) / $30,471,420
The War of the Rohirrim (2024) / $20,658,572

14
Despicable Me
$5,621,741,736
6
$936,956,956
Minions ($1,159,444,662)

	Main series	$3,521,814,379	4	$880,453,595	Despicable Me 3 ($1,034,800,131)
1	Despicable Me 3 (2017)	$1,034,800,131			
2	Despicable Me 4 (2024)	$972,964,428			
3	Despicable Me 2 (2013)	$970,766,005			
4	Despicable Me (2010)	$543,283,815			

	Minions series	$2,099,927,357	2	$1,049,963,679	Minions ($1,159,444,662)
1	Minions (2015)	$1,159,444,662			
2	The Rise of Gru (2022)	$940,482,695			

15
Transformers
$5,424,201,969
9
$602,689,108
Dark of the Moon ($1,123,794,079)

	Main series	$5,418,341,368	8	$677,292,671	Dark of the Moon ($1,123,794,079)
1	Dark of the Moon (2011)	$1,123,794,079			
2	Age of Extinction (2014)	$1,104,054,072			
3	Revenge of the Fallen (2009)	$836,303,693			
4	Transformers (2007)	$709,709,780			
5	The Last Knight (2017)	$605,425,157			
6	Bumblebee (2018)	$467,989,645			
7	Rise of the Beasts (2023)	$441,656,550			
8	One (2024)	$129,408,392			

The Transformers: The Movie (1986)	$5,860,601

16	Mission: Impossible	$4,741,543,902	8	$592,692,988	Fallout ($791,657,398)
1	Fallout (2018)	$791,657,398			
2	Ghost Protocol (2011)	$694,713,380			
3	Rogue Nation (2015)	$682,716,636			
4	The Final Reckoning (2025)	$598,767,057			
5	Dead Reckoning (2023)	$571,125,435			
6	Mission: Impossible 2 (2000)	$546,388,108			
7	Mission: Impossible (1996)	$457,696,391			
8	Mission: Impossible III (2006)	$398,479,497			

17	Pirates of the Caribbean	$4,522,015,850	5	$904,403,170	Dead Man's Chest ($1,066,179,747)
1	Dead Man's Chest (2006)	$1,066,179,747			
2	On Stranger Tides (2011)	$1,045,713,802			
3	At World's End (2007)	$960,996,492			
4	Dead Men Tell No Tales (2017)	$794,861,794			
5	The Curse of the Black Pearl (2003)	$654,264,015			

18
Shrek
$4,023,161,781
6
$670,526,964
Shrek 2 ($932,542,462)

	Main series	$2,982,919,927	4	$745,729,982	Shrek 2 ($932,542,462)
1	Shrek 2 (2004)	$932,542,462			
2	Shrek the Third (2007)	$813,367,380			
3	Shrek Forever After (2010)	$752,600,867			
4	Shrek (2001)	$484,409,218			

	Puss in Boots series	$1,040,241,854	2	$520,120,927	Puss in Boots ($554,987,477)
1	Puss in Boots (2011)	$554,987,477			
2	The Last Wish (2022)	$485,254,377			

19	The Twilight Saga	$3,365,550,566	5	$673,110,113	Breaking Dawn – Part 2 ($830,567,437)
1	Breaking Dawn – Part 2 (2012)	$830,567,437			
2	Breaking Dawn – Part 1 (2011)	$712,716,420			
3	New Moon (2009)	$712,135,229			
4	Eclipse (2010)	$698,822,132			
5	Twilight (2008)	$411,309,348			

20
The Lion King
$3,350,523,252
4
$837,630,813
The Lion King (2019) ($1,656,943,394)

	CGI animated series	$2,379,575,150	2	$1,189,787,575	The Lion King (2019) ($1,656,943,394)
1	The Lion King (2019)	$1,656,943,394			
2	Mufasa (2024)	$722,631,756			

	Traditionally animated series	$970,948,102	2	$485,474,051	The Lion King (1994) ($970,946,637)
1	The Lion King (1994)	$970,946,637			
2	The Lion King 1½ (2004)	$1,465			

^{S}Shared universes for which some properties also have their own entries.

^{*}Canada and U.S. gross only.

^{R}Distributor rental.

== See also ==
- Lists of feature film series
- Highest-grossing franchises and film series
- List of highest-grossing media franchises

== Works cited ==
- Galbraith IV, Stuart (1996). The Japanese Filmography: 1900 through 1994. McFarland. ISBN 0786400323.
- Ryfle, Steve; Godziszewski, Ed (2017). Ishiro Honda: A Life in Film, from Godzilla to Kurosawa. Wesleyan University Press. ISBN 9780819570871.
- Solomon, Charles (2014). Once Upon a Dream: From Perrault's Sleeping Beauty to Disney's Maleficent. Disney Editions. ISBN 9781423199021.
