= Osuofia in London =

2003 Nigerian comedy film

- Directed by: Kingsley Ogoro
- Written by: Kola Munis, Emeka Obiakonwa, Kingsley Ogoro
- Produced by: Kingsley Ogoro, Kola Munis
- Starring: Nkem Owoh; Mara Derwent
- Cinematography: John Ishemeke
- Music by: Kingsley Ogoro
- Distributed by: Kingsley Ogoro Production
- Release date: 2003
- Running time: 105 minutes
- Country: Nigeria
- Languages: English, Igbo

Osuofia in London is a 2003 Nigerian comedy film produced and directed by Kingsley Ogoro, starring Nkem Owoh. The film is arguably one of the highest selling Nollywood films in history. It was followed by 2004 sequel titled Osuofia in London 2.

== Plot summary ==
Osuofia (played by Nkem Owoh) is a foolish villager living in Nigeria. He receives word of the demise of his brother, Donatus (played by Francis Odega) in London. However, in his will, Donatus has left Osuofia with his huge estate as the sole beneficiary. Osuofia makes his way to London only to find out that his late brother's English fiancée, Samantha (played by Mara Derwent) is not quite sure herself, about the Nigerian tradition (i.e., Osuofia being a benefactor of his brother's properties). Cultural misunderstandings result in a comedy of errors.

== Cast ==
- Nkem Owoh - Osuofia
- Mara Derwent - Samantha
- Charles Angiama - Mr. Charles
- Cynthia Okereke - Uremma
- Francis Odega - Obiekwe
- Sebastian Hall - Jeeves
- Sabina Mole - Ijeoma
- Oluchi Agunwa - Uloaku
- Chiwendu Onaga - Adaku
- Blessing Onolleka - NKechi
- Paul Udonsi - Teacher Charles
- Rosa Nicholson-Ellis
- Lucie Bond
- Alessandro Sanguinetti
- Ester Lauren

== See also ==
- List of Nigerian films of 2003
