= List of Nigerian films of 2005 =

This is a list of Nigerian films released in 2005.

== Films ==
| Title | Director | Cast | Genre | Notes |
|---|---|---|---|---|
2005
| Rising Moon | Andy Nwakolor | Akume Akume, Arthur Brooks, Justus Esiri, Onyeka Onwenu | Drama | This film received 12 nominations and won six awards at the 2nd Africa Movie Academy Awards in 2006, including Best Picture, Best Visual Effects and Best Editing. |

== See also ==
- List of Nigerian films
