= Middle-earth in motion pictures =

J. R. R. Tolkien interpretations

J. R. R. Tolkien's novels The Hobbit (1937) and The Lord of the Rings (1954–55), set in his fictional world of Middle-earth, have been the subject of numerous motion picture adaptations across film and television.

Tolkien was skeptical of the prospects of an adaptation. The rights to adapt his works passed through the hands of several studios, having been briefly leased to Rembrandt Films before being sold perpetually to United Artists, who then passed them in part to Saul Zaentz who operated the rights under Middle-earth Enterprises. During this time, filmmakers who attempted to adapt Tolkien's works include William Snyder, Peter Shaffer, John Boorman, Ralph Bakshi, Peter Jackson, and Guillermo del Toro. Other filmmakers who were interested in an adaptation included Walt Disney, Al Brodax, Forrest J Ackerman, Samuel Gelfman, Denis O'Dell, and Heinz Edelmann.

The first commercial adaptation of Tolkien's works was the Rankin/Bass animated television special The Hobbit (1977). The first theatrical adaptation was Ralph Bakshi's animated film The Lord of the Rings (1978). This was followed by the Rankin/Bass animated television film The Return of the King (1980). The first live-action adaptations were European television productions, mostly unlicensed, made in the 1970s and early 1990s. New Line Cinema produced the Lord of the Rings film trilogy (2001–2003) directed by Jackson, and later returned to produce his Hobbit film trilogy (2012–2014). The New Line franchise has received a record 37 Academy Award nominations, winning 17, and a record three special awards. To prevent New Line from losing the film adaptation rights, an anime prequel film was put into production. Subtitled The War of the Rohirrim, it was released in 2024. After Middle-earth Enterprises was acquired by Embracer Group, a new deal was struck with New Line to make two new films. The first was The Hunt for Gollum and is scheduled for release in 2027. In 2017, Amazon Prime Video bought the right to make a television series, separate from the New Line films. Titled The Lord of the Rings: The Rings of Power, the first season was released in 2022 and the second in 2024. Three more seasons are planned. Some well-received fan films based on Tolkien's novels have been made; The Hunt for Gollum and Born of Hope were both uploaded to YouTube in 2009.

== Unproduced early attempts ==
Tolkien watched films, but always mistrusted the medium and his books' suitability for dramatization. He had received fanmail on the matter, some proposing to adapt the works to film and some urging him to refuse such proposals. Tolkien and his publishers, Allen and Unwin, were willing to play along with film proposals, on condition of having a veto on creative decisions or in return for a sufficient sum of money. (Note: Materials pertaining to the treatments of Ackerman, Boorman and Bakshi are stored in the Tolkien papers collection of Marquette University.)

=== Walt Disney ===
In 1938, Walt Disney considered adapting The Hobbit to animation. One of Disney's animators sent a memo suggesting that elements of The Hobbit and Richard Wagner's Ring cycle could be incorporated into Fantasia which was then in the making. According to the animator Wolfgang Reitherman, Walt Disney wanted to make a Lord of the Rings feature film in the 1950s, but his storyboard artists deemed it too complex, too lengthy, and too scary for the company. In 1972, the storyboard artist Vance Gerry pitched an animated adaptation of The Hobbit. He illustrated Bilbo, and produced a synopsis, stating that the Disney studios had "never done a cartoon with this much story", admitting that "there are far more incidents in the story than we could ever use" and that "many sections are too frightening for our purposes."

=== Al Brodax ===
In June 1956, the animator Al Brodax proposed an animated film adaptation to Tolkien's publishers. The final volume of The Lord of the Rings had only just been published in the US, and had not yet achieved the commercial success it reached later. Tolkien, nearing retirement and yet to see a substantial return from his writings, was cautiously interested, saying he would "welcome the idea" of a film, "quite apart from the glint of money", but nothing came out of it.

=== Forrest J. Ackerman ===
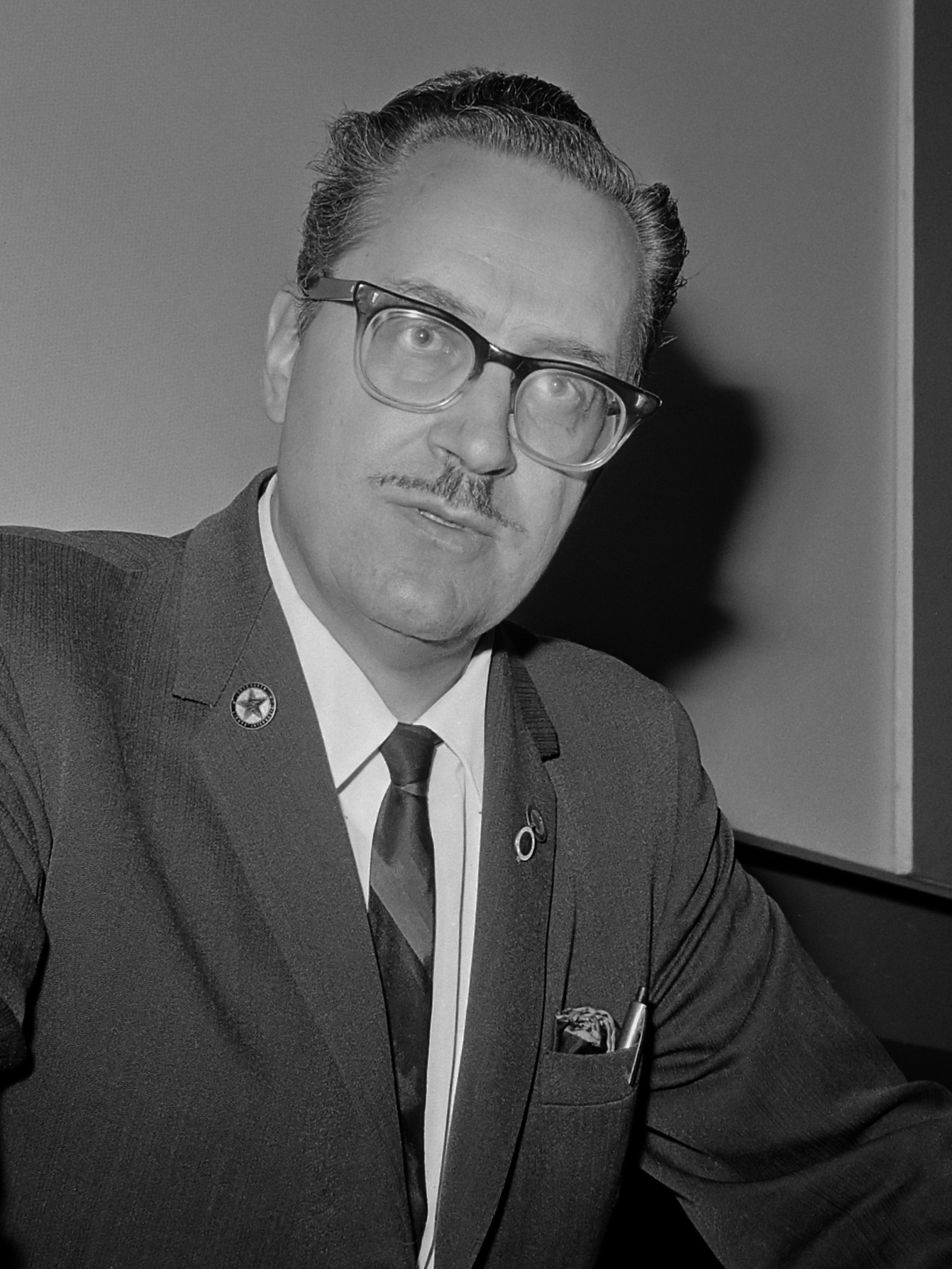
Forrest J. Ackerman approached Tolkien about an animated film of Lord of the Rings.

In 1956, Tolkien was approached by the American agent Forrest J. Ackerman about producing an animated film based on Tolkien's work for the amateur screenwriter Morton Grady Zimmerman. Ackerman showed Tolkien artwork by Ron Cobb and pitched Zimmerman's synopsis, which proposed a three-hour film with two intermissions. Tolkien said it was described to him as an animated film, but he professed to being ignorant of the process, and it is possible that Ackerman wished to make a primarily live-action film, using animation, stop-motion and miniature photography. Cobb scouted locations around California, impressing Tolkien with pictures of mountains and deserts.

Tolkien already had objections – Lothlórien was described to him as a fairy-castle, and he did not like the condensed story – but he liked the concept art, which he thought akin to Arthur Rackham as opposed to Walt Disney, whom he loathed. While Tolkien noted that a film "would be pleasant", he delayed in reviewing the synopsis until urged by Unwin. When he delivered his initial notes to Ackerman, the agent was granted a six-month option if he could find a producer to finance the project. He intended to make the film with American International Pictures, but its president James Nicholson declined, as did other studio heads.

Tolkien was sent a 55-page treatment by Zimmerman, which he greatly disliked. Keeping his own and his publisher's financial interests in mind, Tolkien was polite but largely critical of the script. He complained of divergence from not only the tone of the book (such as cutting elements "upon which [its] characteristic and peculiar tone principally depends") but also the character representation (such as Sam's leaving Frodo to Shelob and going on to Mount Doom alone). He took issue with dialogue changes as regards the "style and sentiment" of characters, and with intercutting between the storylines of Frodo and Aragorn, instead of the interlacing in the book. He suggested eliminating the battle of Helm's Deep to better emphasize the defence of Minas Tirith, and cutting characters instead of diminishing their roles. Tolkien protested against added "incantations, blue lights, and some irrelevant magic" and "a preference for fights".

Nevertheless, Tolkien did not wish to kill the project, saying "I think [it] promised well on the pictorial side." Ackerman filed to extend his lease to a year, but he was unable to pay for the extension, and negotiations ended. The treatment was criticised by Ian Nathan, Tom Shippey and others; Kristin Thompson noted the amateur nature of the enterprise, saying that it never represented a serious attempt at a commercial film. Zimmerman, who avoided filmmaking after this ordeal, donated his script to the Tolkien collection.

=== Robert Gutwillig ===
In 1959, Tolkien entered brief negotiations with Robert Gutwillig to adapt The Lord of the Rings. Tolkien told Gutwillig he had "given a considerable amount of time and thought" to a film adaptation, noting "some ideas concerning what I think would be desirable" as well as the "difficulties" involved. Tolkien spoke with Gutwillig's agent and producer, Samuel W. Gelfman. Their discussion was apparently amicable; Tolkien found Gelfman intelligent and reasonable, and Gelfman later recalled that they talked about the details of an adaptation, but nothing came of it.

Tolkien later received a suggestion in fan-mail to have The Hobbit adapted to a serial in four intervals, declined by his publisher Rayner Unwin for its potential to "incarcerate us in the local odeons for nine or ten hours."

=== BBC ===
Tolkien negotiated television rights separately. Carole Ward suggested adapting The Lord of the Rings for television in 1964, to air on the newly launched BBC2. ITV launched a competing offer, according to which the book would be adapted via puppetry, which Tolkien found contemptuous. Another attempt at purchasing the television rights was made in 1968.

=== United Artists ===
Live-action fantasy became fashionable in the early 1960s with the success of Ray Harryhausen's stop-motion productions. By 1967, Gelfman established Katzka-Bernie productions with Gabriel Katzka and entered negotiations with Tolkien to adapt The Lord of the Rings for United Artists, "with an option for The Hobbit." As with Snyder, the emerging contracts would provide United Artists with complete creative freedom over the works, and offered them first bidding at the television rights, which were negotiated separately but never sold to them.

Meanwhile, a couple of American teenagers unsuccessfully attempted to obtain the rights to The Hobbit. Joy Hill, Tolkien's secretary who worked for Allen & Unwin, was said to have contacted Disney for the rights at the time, perhaps to place United Artists in a competitive position. MGM were said to have been interested in the rights at that time.

United Artists were the studio behind several of the lucrative widescreen epics of the decade. In the 1960s, long widescreen epics (presented as a roadshow with an intermission) still proved successful, but few sequels were made in that genre, and therefore Katzka-Bernie commissioned Sir Peter Shaffer to write a treatment for a single, three-hour film adaptation of The Lord of the Rings. This was deemed "elegant", with The Hobbit in mind as a potential prequel. Merchandising was of little concern at the time, but the rights for such products were included in the contract. Negotiations extended until 1969, when the rights were sold off for $250,000 and 7.5% of gross receipts, minus expenses, to be paid to Tolkien. Shaffer's script never got off the ground, but the rights were sold to United Artists in perpetuity, including the option to pass the rights to another studio. The singer Arlo Guthrie pitched an animated feature to the studio, but UA were adamant they wanted the film to be live-action, although the contract options an animated film.

Stanley Unwin suggested that Tolkien's inexperience in dealing with movie producers led to the generous conditions of the contract. Now elderly, Tolkien's desire to set up a trust fund for his grandchildren could indicate that he might not have expected to live and see the resulting film, and wanted to use the profits to take care of his ailing wife. The increase in income tax rates at the time decreased Tolkien's profits from book sales, and he expected a fall-off in the sales in years to come. In 1968, Tolkien expressed skepticism about film adaptation of his works, saying "it's easier to film the Odyssey".

==== Apple Films ====
The Beatles were on a three-picture deal with United Artists. Their previous two features, A Hard Day's Night and Help!, directed by Richard Lester, were successful. When it became clear that the animated Yellow Submarine would not count as part of this deal, Denis O'Dell (head of the Beatles' Apple Films) entered negotiations for their third film. He came up with the idea of a Lord of the Rings "multimedia musical extravaganza", starring the Beatles as the four Hobbits. He learned that United Artists were in negotiations for the rights. In conversation with studio heads David and Arnold Picker, it was decided that a "star director" was required. O'Dell shortlisted David Lean, Stanley Kubrick, and Michelangelo Antonioni. Lean declined. O'Dell left to India to visit the Beatles, with the books in his suitcase. At the behest of Donovan, the band examined the books and began to think "seriously" about the idea. According to O'Dell, John Lennon fancied the role of Gandalf, but George Harrison recalled that Lennon then wanted to swap for Frodo. Ringo Starr wanted to play Sam, while Paul McCartney coveted Frodo. Lennon would have been Gollum, Ringo Sam, and Harrison Gandalf. Donovan was keen on Merry, and they wanted Twiggy for Galadriel.

Kubrick declined, telling O'Dell the books were excellent, but "unfilmable". Kubrick had worked on genre films and had pioneered special effects in 2001: A Space Odyssey, but it proved complex to produce, and he had difficulty depicting the aliens onscreen, which would have made him wary of the prospect of rendering fantasy creatures. He was still promoting that film and it was not making the box-office returns that he had hoped for. Chris Conkling and Peter Jackson later said that making it live-action at the time was inconceivable; Ralph Bakshi said it could have been made, but would have been "very tacky."

Heinz Edelmann, a fan of the book and art director on Yellow Submarine, pitched his own idea for an adaptation to United Artists. Thinking that a "straight" adaptation of the story was impossible, he wanted to do an animated film in the style of Fantasia or "rock opera" with a Kurosawa-like aesthetic. He considered the Rolling Stones to star, but then latched onto the Beatles; however, United Artists wanted a live-action film.

O'Dell talked to Antonioni, who is said to have been keener, but the project never started. The group argued over their desired parts, and Harrison and McCartney were skeptical. McCartney remembers that Tolkien had reservations. There were false rumours that the Beatles and Kubrick talked about an adaptation in 1965. After the rights were secured and John Boorman made his script, the idea of casting the Beatles (as the four Hobbits) was brought back to the table by David Picker, until the band's separation became publicly known in 1970. In retrospect, O'Dell is skeptical of the whole venture. Others involved had since described the project as "inspired showmanship."

According to Peter Jackson, Tolkien disliked "the idea of a pop group doing his story" and thus "nixed" the project.

==== John Boorman ====
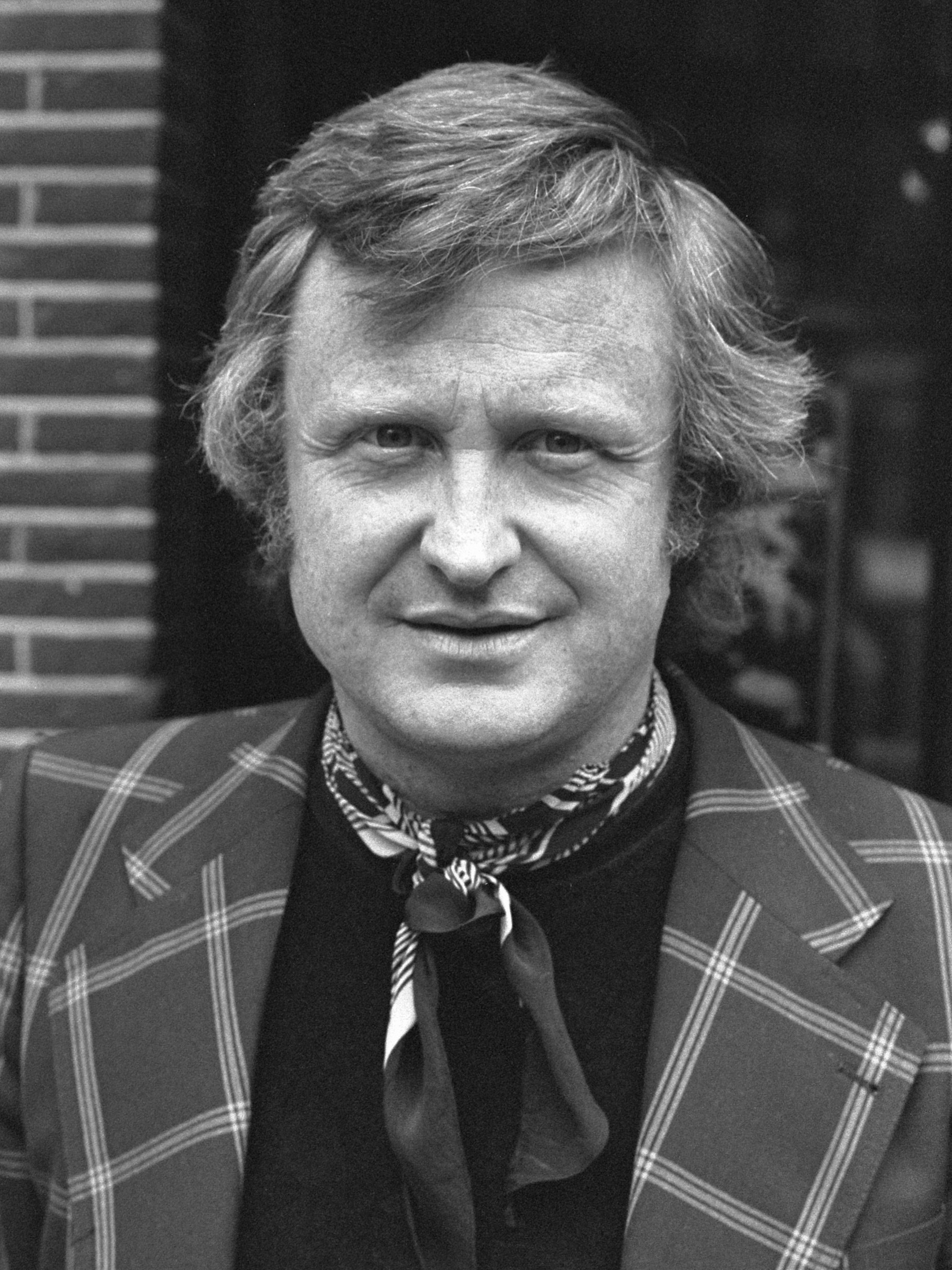
John Boorman worked on a script for a single three-hour film of The Lord of the Rings, which he thought unworkable.

In 1969, John Boorman approached David Picker about an Arthurian epic; Picker instead commissioned him to do The Lord of the Rings as a single, three-hour film. Boorman thought it impossible, but allowed himself to be persuaded. The project was announced in 1970, to be co-produced by Gabriel Katzka.

Boorman had wanted Tolkien to have a cameo in his film, and corresponded with Tolkien about the project, telling him he intended to make it with small people playing the Hobbits and in live-action, which Tolkien preferred. He considered having children dressed with facial hair, dubbed by adult actors. Al Pacino was considered for Frodo, and Sauron is described in the script as looking like Mick Jagger. In retrospect, Boorman recognized that it "might have been" a disaster, saying that a trilogy was a wiser choice. Pallenberg was sorry that they never got to revise the script, which exists only as a rough draft; Boorman has described it as "almost unmakeable." Bakshi later exaggerated it as a 700-page screenplay, but at 178 pages, Boorman and Pallenberg wanted to reduce it to around 150.

The script added many new elements and modified others. It downplayed the Catholic aspects of the work in favour of a Jungian, surrealistic, counter-culture interpretation, with carnal elements. Gimli is put in a hole and beaten so he can retrieve the password to Moria from his ancestral memory; Frodo and Galadriel have sexual intercourse; Arwen is a teenaged spiritual guide, while her role as Aragorn's love interest is transferred to Éowyn; Aragorn's healing of Éowyn takes place on the battlefield and has sexual overtones; the Orcs turn good with Sauron's defeat. To cut costs, all flying steeds were removed. As in Boorman's other genre films, he let his earlier concept of Merlin influence his writing of Gandalf, while Galadriel's emergence from the lake recalls his Arthurian Lady of the Lake.

By the time Boorman returned to head of production, Mike Medavoy, the studio had suffered a series of commercial failures. David and Arnold Picker were replaced by Arthur B. Krim and Robert Benjamin, who had not read Tolkien's books. They were intrigued, but the script called for more expensive optical effects than was originally conceived, and the executives were unsure the audience would be sufficient, thinking the genre mostly appealed to children, and the project stalled. Boorman tried shopping the project at other studios. Disney were interested, but balked at the violence; no other studio was interested in making a widescreen epic. Boorman remembers that as late as 1975, "all I got was embarrassed smiles". In the early 1990s, Boorman again contacted Medavoy about The Lord of the Rings using new special effects technologies, but the project fell apart when Zaentz wanted more money, demanding merchandising rights for himself.

==== Other attempts and influence ====
Zaentz rejected many proposals for film adaptations in years to come, including from Mark Ordesky and John Boorman. Universal once contacted him for the rights, to no avail. In 1993, European producers commissioned a treatment for two or three live-action films, but terminated the project when it became apparent that Zaentz would not extend the rights to them. In 1997, Alan Lee was sent a script for a twelve-part TV adaptation by ITV Granada, for which they "couldn't get the approval" from Zaentz. Franco Zeffirelli, Jake Kasdan, Sir Ridley Scott, Steven Spielberg and George Lucas were rumoured to have had an interest in the rights in the 1980s and/or 1990s. The Hobbit was an influence on George Lucas's Star Wars, and he later entered a lucrative partnership with Spielberg in producing and writing the stories for his Indiana Jones films. It was supposedly Lucas' inability to acquire the rights to The Hobbit (which would have been split between Zaentz and UA, anyway) that led to the creation of An Ewok Adventure and Willow, both heavily indebted to The Hobbit. Willow was eventually directed by Ron Howard, financed by Lucasfilm and distributed by MGM, and its inability to make substantial profits ended the high-fantasy productions of the 1980s. Nevertheless, Spielberg's DreamWorks Pictures reportedly tried for the rights in the early 1990s.

== First animated productions ==
=== Rembrandt Films (1967) ===
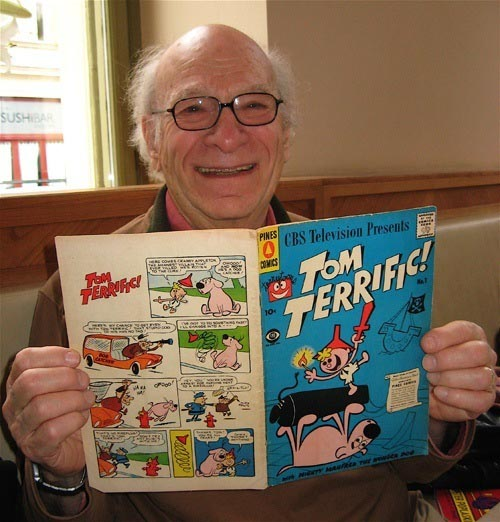
The cartoonist Gene Deitch (pictured) drew the images for a 12-minute short. It was the first onscreen version of any of Tolkien's works.

In 1961, William L. Snyder negotiated the rights to adapt The Hobbit to animation for his Oscar-winning company, Rembrandt films. He leased The Hobbit for five years. Due to a mishap in the publishing of the first edition, the book was public domain in the US; Snyder renegotiated the lease to give Tolkien and Unwin only a $15,000 advance. Tolkien thought Snyder was "sure to perpetrate [...] many objectionable things" but leased the rights to the producer in 1962. Snyder commissioned cartoonist Gene Deitch to write a script for a feature-length Hobbit cartoon; this took liberties with the text, inserting a princess of Dale who undertakes the Quest and ends up married to Bilbo. Deitch was unaware of The Lord of the Rings until later, when he incorporated the concept of the Ring of Power into the Gollum (or Goloom, as he is called in the piece) episode later in the writing, making The Lord of the Rings sequel possible.

When a deal with 20th Century Fox fell through and the rights were due to expire, Snyder commissioned Deitch to quickly make a condensed film to fulfil the requirements of the contract. The deal was for an animated, colour film but did not specify length; Deitch was told to compress the story into an animated short, screened in New York in 1967 to prolong Snyder's now-valuable lease on the rights.

Deitch's film was the first onscreen depiction of any of Tolkien's works, but it was little more than a narrated picture-book; a narrator tells the 12-minute short story over a series of animation stills. It was exhibited only once, in a projection room at New York to around twelve spectators pulled from the street and provided the admission money by the exhibitors, so that they could sign a document stating that they paid to see a colour film based on The Hobbit.

Deitch stated that the extended lease included the rights to The Lord of the Rings, and that the rights to both novels were sold back to Tolkien for a higher price. However, the publisher Stanley Unwin maintains that Snyder continued to hold only the rights to The Hobbit, which were sold directly to United Artists when they secured the rights to The Lord of the Rings.

=== Rankin/Bass's The Hobbit TV special (1977) ===
In 1972, the animators Rankin and Bass decided to adapt Tolkien's works to animation as part of their series of television specials. Rankin thought adapting the whole of Lord of the Rings was impossible, and that the audience "wouldn't sit still for it." He decided that The Hobbit would be manageable, although portions of The Lord of the Rings were optioned as a sequel given pressure from the network. At $2 million to produce, the special would prove the costliest made up to that time; it starred John Huston, a fan of the book, as Gandalf.

They contacted the Tolkien Estate, who declined, but Rankin pointed out that the books were public domain in the US. The Estate, along with Saul Zaentz who had purchased the film rights, tried to stop the production through a lawsuit, but it instead "became authorized through a series of settlement agreements" which allowed the special to air in Canada, where the books were not public domain.

The making of the special was announced in April 1973 by Tomorrow Entertainment. The designs were done by Rankin, Bass and several Japanese animators working in the United States. Lester Abrams sent Rankin 20 character designs after Rankin and Bass liked his work on an excerpt of Tolkien for Children's Digest. He was brought on board again later in the production to help illustrate the Dwarves – basing Thorin on concept art for Disney's Grumpy. He drew Gollum as a corrupted Hobbit, but Rankin insisted that he be made more ferocious. Romeo Muller was employed to write the teleplay. His first draft tried to encompass the whole of the story, plus a setup for The Lord of the Rings at the end. Rankin had him pare it down, and at one point wanted to cut out the spiders, but was talked out of it by Lester. Beorn was "sacrificed" to keep the Spiders.

The television special received mixed reactions. In 1978, Muller won a Peabody Award for the teleplay. The film was nominated for the Hugo Award for Best Dramatic Presentation, but lost to Star Wars. Douglas A. Anderson, a Tolkien scholar, called the adaptation "execrable" in his introduction to the Annotated Hobbit. Ian Nathan considers it "regrettable" and "twee."

=== Ralph Bakshi's The Lord of the Rings (1978) ===
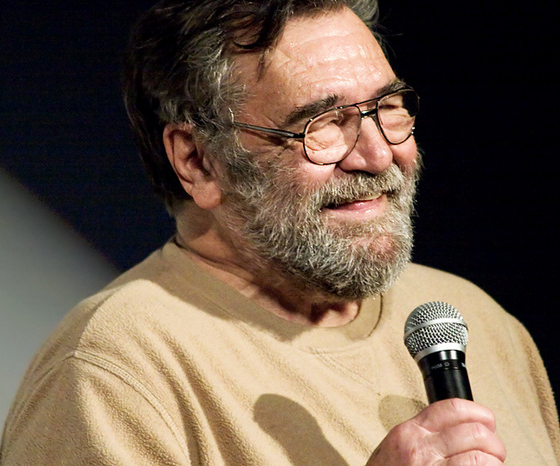
Ralph Bakshi made an animated film of roughly the first half of The Lord of the Rings.

In 1957, Ralph Bakshi sought the rights for an animated version, aiming to make a Tolkienesque fantasy film "in the American idiom"; this led to the 1977 animation Wizards. After Tolkien's death in 1973, Bakshi started an "annual trip" to Medavoy, proposing that United Artists produce The Lord of the Rings as two or three animated films, with a Hobbit prequel. Medavoy offered him Boorman's script, which Bakshi refused, saying that Boorman "didn't understand it" and that his script would have made for a cheap product like "a Roger Corman film". He later called the Rankin-Bass TV special an "awful, sell-out version of The Hobbit." Medavoy did not want to produce Bakshi's film, but allowed him to shop it around to other studios.

In 1976, Bakshi and Dan Melnick, then-president of Metro-Goldwyn-Mayer, purchased the film rights from United Artists for $3 million, and Bakshi started pre-production and writing; he enlisted Chris Conkling to research the script. With $200,000 spent, Melnick was fired from MGM. Bakshi persuaded Saul Zaentz to produce The Lord of the Rings. Zaentz had recently produced the Academy Award-winning adaptation of One Flew Over the Cuckoo's Nest, distributed by United Artists, and agreed to buy the project. UA stayed as the distributors. Zaentz was only able to offer a humble budget of $8 million. Since Bakshi was primarily interested in Tolkien's more adult-oriented novel, Zaentz's Fantasy Films procured the rights to The Lord of the Rings as well as the rights for The Hobbit. The rights to distribute the prequel remained with United Artists. Bakshi later clarified that he thought the film could "make some money" to save his studio after the commercial failure of his previous film, Coonskin.

With Conkling, Bakshi considered how to divide the story. They contemplated a three-film structure, but "we didn't know how that middle film would work". Conkling started writing a single three-and-a-half hour feature of the entire work, but eventually settled on two two-and-a-half hour films. At one point, the story was to be told in flashback by Merry and Pippin to Treebeard as a setup for the second film, tentatively set to be released in 1980. Early drafts by Conkling included Farmer Maggot, Tom Bombadil, the Old Forest, Glorfindel, Arwen, and several songs. Conkling's work was deemed unsatisfactory by Bakshi and Zaentz, who brought in Peter S. Beagle to do rewrites. He insisted on a complete overhaul, and wrote a version which began at Bilbo's Farewell Party, continuing until Saruman's death, while Frodo and Sam left Cirith Ungol. This was abbreviated in later revisions to create a two-and-a-half hour film. The final revisions overlapped with the voice recording in London, accounting for inconsistencies like the spelling of "Saruman" (originally changed to Aruman to avoid confusion with Sauron) in the film. Bakshi constantly revised the story at the behest of anxious fans.

Bakshi was approached by Mick Jagger and David Carradine for roles in the film. Carradine even suggested that Bakshi do it in live-action, but Bakshi said it could not be done and that he had "always seen it as animation."

Bakshi went to England to recruit a voice cast from the BBC Drama Repertory Company, including Christopher Guard, William Squire, Michael Scholes, Anthony Daniels, and John Hurt. Bakshi then shot character actors playing to the recording in empty soundstages, rotoscoping the performances. Bakshi later regretted his use of rotoscoping, stating that he made a mistake by tracing the source footage rather than using it as a guide. Live-action footage for crowd scenes was shot in Death Valley and in Spain. To cut costs, cinematographer Timothy Galfas suggested solarizing the crowd scenes rather than fully rotoscoping them, to create a pseudo-animated look. The film was animated in the United States by Bakshi's studio. Bakshi had only four weeks to edit the film, of which little was reportedly left on the cutting room floor. The whole project from pitch to release lasted about two years.

Arthur Krim was replaced at United Artists by Andy Albeck, who objected to marketing the film as the first of two parts. After test screenings, it was decided to switch the last two sequences, so that the film would not end on the cliffhanger of Frodo and Sam being led into a trap by Gollum. The film was released without any indication that a second part would follow, over Bakshi's objections. Rated PG, it was the longest animated film made at the time, and cost $8–12 million to produce; it grossed $30.5 million at the box office. However, the sum did not tempt the studio into making a sequel, and merchandise and VHS sales were not promising. The film won the Golden Gryphon at the 1980 Giffoni Film Festival, but critical reaction was mixed; Roger Ebert called Bakshi's effort a "mixed blessing" and "an entirely respectable, occasionally impressive job ... [which] still falls far short of the charm and sweep of the original story." Peter Jackson described the film's second half as "incoherent" and confusing.

Work began on a sequel, and Bakshi and Zaentz tried to stop Rankin and Bass from airing the Lord of the Rings television special to avoid overlap with their film, but fearing a fall-off in revenue from the sequel, the studio would only sign-off on a budget half that of the first film, which led the already disheartened Bakshi to argue with Zaentz and quit. In 2000, Bakshi was still toying with making part two with Zaentz.

The BBC's 1981 radio adaptation recruited veterans of Bakshi's voice cast, Michael Graham Cox and Peter Woodthorpe, to reprise their roles (Boromir and Gollum, respectively) from the film. Sir Ian Holm voiced Frodo.

=== Rankin/Bass's Return of the King TV special (1980) ===
In 1980, Rankin/Bass more or less completed what Bakshi had started with their own animated adaptation of The Return of the King, based on the concepts previously applied to their The Hobbit. Contrary to reports that the film was made following the failure of Bakshi's film, it was already in pre-production before Rankin/Bass released The Hobbit. Zaentz and Bakshi sued Rankin and Bass to prevent the television special from airing, but were unsuccessful. Rankin/Bass first titled the film Frodo: The Hobbit II, but as part of their settlement with Tolkien's estate, it was renamed The Return of the King, with the subtitle "A Story of Hobbits". In retrospect, Rankin expressed regret over the unsuccessful television special, saying "we shouldn't have made it."

== European live-action television productions ==
The first live-action adaptations of Tolkien were European television productions made in the 1970s and early 1990s, mostly unlicensed. In 1971, the Swedish broadcaster Sveriges Television aired Sagan om Ringen, a short broadcast in two parts, consisting of live-action actors against animated backgrounds. It was based on The Fellowship of the Ring, and directed by Bo Hansson, who had previously made a music album based on The Lord of the Rings, under license from the Tolkien Estate.

In 1985, the Soviet Union aired The Fabulous Journey of Mr. Bilbo Baggins the Hobbit (Russian: Сказочное путешествие мистера Бильбо Беггинса Хоббита), a television special based on the events of The Hobbit. Shot in 1984 as a teleplay and produced in the framework of the children's television series Tale after Tale (Russian: Сказка за сказкой), it featured actors such as Zinovy Gerdt as Narrator (Tolkien), Mikhail Danilov as Bilbo Baggins, Anatoly Ravikovich as Thorin and Igor Dmitriev as Gollum. Work on a combined animated/stop motion Hobbit cartoon, titled Treasures Under the Mountain, started in 1991, but the production stopped at an early stage, and only a six-minute intro is known to exist.

The long-lost 1991 Russian adaptation, Khraniteli, in a scene of "The House of Tom Bombadil", showing Goldberry and Tom Bombadil, with the four Hobbits drastically scaled down in a "ludicrous" green-screen effect

A live-action adaptation of The Fellowship of the Ring, Khraniteli ("Keepers" or "Guardians" [of the Ring]) was aired once in the Soviet Union in 1991, and was thought lost, but was rediscovered and republished on the Web. It includes plot elements such as Tom Bombadil and the Barrow-wight omitted from Jackson's version, but has basic sets and "ludicrous" green-screen effects.

In 1993, the Finnish broadcaster Yle produced a licensed nine-episode live-action miniseries called Hobitit ("The Hobbits"). Despite the name it was based on The Lord of the Rings rather than The Hobbit; but it included only the parts of the story that the hobbits had witnessed themselves. The series was written and directed by Timo Torikka; Toni Edelmann composed the soundtrack. This is the only film adaptation which includes "The Scouring of the Shire", and, until the recovery of the Soviet movie, the only one known to include Tom Bombadil and the Barrow-wight. It aired again in 1998, but then the rights to broadcast it were revoked.

== Warner Bros. and New Line Cinema ==
The director Peter Jackson brought Middle-earth to the big screen in six live-action feature films released by Warner Bros. Jackson pitched the idea of adapting The Lord of the Rings and The Hobbit to Miramax Films in 1995. He had seen Bakshi's Lord of the Rings in 1978, enjoyed it, and "wanted to know more", reading a tie-in version of the book and listening to the 1981 BBC radio adaptation. Assuming that it would be made into a live-action film, he read about previous attempts to adapt the work – by Boorman, Kubrick and Lean – but did not know what was myth and what was not at the time. He watched and enjoyed the fantasy films and space operas of the 1980s. He later read Tolkien's letters and learned that Forrest Ackerman, who appeared in Jackson's Bad Taste, had tried to make a film in the 1950s.

While he was aware that "three films would obviously be the more natural way to do" The Lord of the Rings, and that The Hobbit would better be split across two films, he made a more modest offer of a trilogy: one film based on The Hobbit which, if successful, would be followed by two Lord of the Rings instalments, released six months apart. Although Jackson and his partner Fran Walsh re-read The Hobbit and commissioned their workshop at WETA for some concept art, the rights to The Hobbit proved difficult because they were split between Zaentz and Metro-Goldwyn-Mayer's United Artists. The Weinsteins tried to purchase the rights from UA, but were unsuccessful.

Jackson, Walsh and Miramax decided to move ahead with The Lord of the Rings, leaving The Hobbit as a possible prequel. Jackson insisted on making two films; the Weinsteins "blanched" but agreed. While filming, Jackson told Elijah Wood he was not interested in directing The Hobbit, but during post-production on The Two Towers, spoke more enthusiastically of it with the composer Howard Shore. Jackson also later made remarks about potential spinoff films and even half-joking remarks about television spin-off shows.

=== The Lord of the Rings film trilogy (2001–2003) ===
Eventually, it became clear that the scope of the project was beyond Miramax Films' ability to finance. An appeal to its parent company, Disney, for additional funding was denied: the CEO Michael Eisner later claimed this was because Weinstein refused to show Eisner the scripts, but his decision to split the percentage evenly with the Weinsteins may speak to a more fundamental mistrust in the project. Miramax looked to co-operate with other studios such as DreamWorks Pictures and Lucasfilm Ltd., but was unsuccessful.

The Weinsteins suggested reducing the project to a single, two-hour film. Jackson was willing to consider this, if the film was to be around four hours in length, but Miramax Films limited it to two hours, and offered suggestions in order to achieve this, namely amalgamating Gondor and Rohan. They contacted Hossein Amini to rewrite and threatened to get John Madden or Quentin Tarantino to direct. Jackson believes this was an empty threat to get him to do the one-film version. He refused, but his agent Ken Kamins convinced Weinstein that getting another filmmaker to work on the project would result in further delays and costs, at which point Weinstein allowed Jackson to find another studio to take over.

Robert Zemeckis/ImageMovers, Universal, and DreamWorks Pictures declined. Fox were interested, but unwilling to enter a project involving Saul Zaentz, and Sony and Centropolis did not find the scripts to their liking. Weinstein limited the turnaround to three weeks, hoping that Jackson would have to come back to him and direct the one-film version.

In 1998, New Line Cinema assumed production and distribution responsibility while the Weinsteins retained on-screen credits as executive producers. The three films were shot simultaneously. They featured extensive computer-generated imagery, including major battle scenes utilizing the "Massive" software program. The first film, subtitled The Fellowship of the Ring, was released on 19 December 2001; the second, subtitled The Two Towers, on 18 December 2002; and the third, subtitled The Return of the King, worldwide on 17 December 2003. All three won the Hugo Award for Best (Long-form) Dramatic Presentation in their respective years.

The films were met with both critical and commercial success. With 30 nominations, the trilogy became the most-nominated in the Academy's history, surpassing the Godfather series' 28 (with the release of The Hobbit, the series currently has 36 nominations total). Of these, Jackson's adaptations garnered seventeen Oscar statuettes and three Scientific and Technical awards: four for The Fellowship of the Ring, two for The Two Towers, eleven for The Return of the King plus two Scientific and Technical Awards, and one such award for An Unexpected Journey, "for the development of the Tissue Physically–Based Character Simulation Framework."

The Return of the King won all the eleven awards for which it was nominated, including Best Picture; as well as a Technical Achievement Award and the Scientific and Engineering Award. Titanic six years earlier and the 1959 version of Ben-Hur each won eleven awards overall, an industry record until the release of The Return of the King. The film also broke the previous "sweep" record, beating Gigi and The Last Emperor, which each took 9 out of 9. The Return of the King became the highest-grossing film opening on a Wednesday, and was the second film after Titanic to earn over US$1 billion worldwide. The Lord of the Rings film trilogy became the highest grossing motion picture trilogy worldwide of all time, evidenced by its earning close to $3-billion (US). Critics have hailed the trilogy as "the greatest films of our era," and "the trilogy will not soon, if ever, find its equal."

The series drew acclaim from within the industry, including from people formerly interested in adapting Tolkien: Ackerman, who appeared on Jackson's Bad Taste said his pitch "could never have been given the grand treatment that Peter Jackson afforded it." Deitch thought the films were "serious and great." McCartney said he loved the films, and watched them each Christmas with his family. Boorman was happy about his film's cancellation, as it resulted in Jackson's films. On the other hand, Edelmann said he thought it was "badly directed", and that "Tolkein [sic] wasn't such a great storyteller." Bakshi felt that the film was derivative of his own without due acknowledgment, and that Jackson "didn't really get it." However, he did praise the effects of "thousands of men in armies attacks each other." Bakshi's writer, Peter Beagle, said Jackson has done it the only way possible, by making three different movies" and one of Bakshi's animators, Michael Ploog, said the trilogy was "brilliantly handled."

=== The Hobbit film trilogy (2012–2014) ===
Jackson was unsure if he should direct The Hobbit, so as to not compete with himself, but he did want to produce and write an adaptation of the book. He considered helming a Hobbit film and a Lord of the Rings prequel film in 2006, before deciding to produce two films based on The Hobbit for a director of his choosing. New Line suggested Sam Raimi to direct, but in 2008, Guillermo Del Toro was chosen to direct a two-film adaptation, produced by Jackson and co-written with Walsh, Philippa Boyens, and Del Toro. Time constraints caused Del Toro to bow out, and Jackson stepped in to direct. Other directors said to have been considered are Neill Blomkamp, David Yates, David Dobkin and Brett Ratner.

During principal photography, Jackson looked at assembled footage and decided to split the piece into three instalments, released between 2012 and 2014. The three films are subtitled An Unexpected Journey, The Desolation of Smaug and The Battle of the Five Armies. As with The Lord of the Rings trilogy, the prequel movies were filmed back to back in New Zealand; principal photography began on 21 March 2011.

The films star Martin Freeman as Bilbo Baggins, Richard Armitage as Thorin Oakenshield and Benedict Cumberbatch as Smaug. Several actors from The Lord of the Rings reprised their roles, including Ian McKellen, Andy Serkis, Hugo Weaving, Cate Blanchett, Christopher Lee, Ian Holm, Elijah Wood and Orlando Bloom.

Also returning were the heads of almost all departments in the production: the only major changes in the staff were of the role of the gaffer (after Brian Bansgrove died) and with stunt co-ordinator Glen Boswall replacing George Marshall Ruge. Editor Jabez Olssen, who worked on the editing of the Rings trilogy, edited all three Hobbit films.

=== Franchise expansion (2024–present) ===
In June 2021, New Line announced an anime prequel about Helm Hammerhand, a legendary King of Rohan, set around 200 years before the events of The Lord of the Rings. Kenji Kamiyama was directing the film, titled The Lord of the Rings: The War of the Rohirrim. The film is produced by Boyens and written by her daughter, Phoebe Gittins, as well as Gittens's writing partner Arty Papageorgiou. The film was put into production to prevent Warner Bros. and New Line from losing the film adaptation rights for the novels, but Zaentz was not convinced that the studios were meeting their obligations. In October 2024, Boyens said the producers had an idea for a second anime The Lord of the Rings film, but they were waiting to see how well The War of the Rohirrim was received. The film was released in December 2024.

After Middle-earth Enterprises was acquired by Embracer Group, Warner Bros. and New Line signed a new deal with them to make more The Lord of the Rings live-action films. In May 2024, the studios announced that two new films were in development with Jackson, Walsh, and Boyens producing. The first new film was The Hunt for Gollum, with Serkis directing from a screenplay by Walsh, Boyens, Gittins, and Papageorgiou. In October 2024, Boyens stated, "we've begun to work, conceptually, on two different live-action films. The first being The Hunt For Gollum, the second one still to be confirmed." She added that the ideas for both of the films included the character of Gandalf. In February 2025, Serkis said filming would take place in 2026. RNZ reported that Wellington, New Zealand would serve as the production hub for the new Lord of the Rings films. In June 2024, Sir Ian McKellen said he was open to playing the role of Gandalf again in future projects. At a fan event in August 2025, McKellen said that "There's a character in the movie called Frodo, and there's a character in the movie called Gandalf", though he did not specify whether he or Elijah Wood, who was also present at the event, would be reprising their roles. The Hunt for Gollum is scheduled to be released on 17 December 2027. On 15 June, it was announced that Anya Taylor-Joy joined the cast as Seren, a Sindar Elf from the Woodland Realm.

In March 2026, Peter Jackson announced that Stephen Colbert was co-writing the script for a new Lord of the Rings movie in collaboration with his son Peter McGee and Philippa Boyens. The project is being developed under the working title The Lord of the Rings: Shadow of the Past. The plot is said to chronologically be set decades after The Return of the King, but detail events from a number of chapters in The Fellowship of the Ring which were not depicted in its adaptation.

In May 2026, at Cannes Film Festival, Jackson announced that he was in the early stages of developing an adaptation of Tolkien's other writings into films, which would include The Silmarillion and Unfinished Tales of Númenor and Middle-earth as source material. Acknowledging that though Christopher Tolkien had previously been against the idea, the filmmaker detailed that since his passing in 2020 he has been collaborating with the family's estate.

== Amazon Studios ==
Amazon bought the television rights for The Lord of the Rings for US$250 million in November 2017, making a five-season production commitment worth at least US$1 billion. This would make it the most expensive television series ever made. The series is primarily based on the appendices of The Lord of the Rings, which include discussion of the Second Age, and it features a large cast from around the world. For legal reasons, it is not a direct continuation of Jackson's The Lord of the Rings and The Hobbit film trilogies, but the production is intended to evoke the films with similar production design and younger versions of the same incarnations of characters who appear in them. The first season premiered on Prime Video on 2 September 2022. The second season premiered on Prime Video on 29 August 2024.

== Fan films ==
The Hunt for Gollum, a fan film based on elements of the appendices to The Lord of the Rings, was released on the internet in May 2009. It is set between the events of The Hobbit and The Fellowship of the Ring, and depicts Aragorn's quest to find Gollum. The film's visual style is based on that of the Jackson films. Although unofficial, it has received coverage in major media and praise for its production quality.

Another fan made feature film, Born of Hope, produced and directed by Kate Madison, was released online on 1 December 2009 on Dailymotion and later on YouTube. It is set before the events of The Hobbit. The film can be streamed freely on its main website. Like The Hunt for Gollum, this film triggered reviews in various media.

Commercial and legal pressures on would-be fan film producers are substantial; at least one such project, the 2013–14 Storm over Gondolin, was forced to close by the Tolkien Estate. There are pressures, too, from other fans; some projects have been abandoned when their trailers were inundated by fan criticism.

== Reception ==
=== Box office performance ===
Motion picture	Release date	Box office gross (rounded)			Budget	Refs
Motion picture	Release date	Worldwide	North America	Other territories	Budget	Refs
The Lord of the Rings	15 November 1978	$31m	$30m	$5m	$6m	
The Lord of the Rings: The Fellowship of the Ring	19 December 2001	$887m	$315m	$556m	$93m	
The Lord of the Rings: The Two Towers	18 December 2002	$938m	$342m	$583m	$94m	
The Lord of the Rings: The Return of the King	17 December 2003	$1,138m	$378m	$742m	$94m	
The Hobbit: An Unexpected Journey	14 December 2012	$1,017m	$303m	$714m	$200m	
The Hobbit: The Desolation of Smaug	13 December 2013	$959m	$258m	$702m	$225m	
The Hobbit: The Battle of the Five Armies	17 December 2014	$962m	$255m	$707m	$250m	
The Lord of the Rings: The War of the Rohirrim	13 December 2024	$20m	$9m	$11m	$30m	
Rounded totals		$5,932m	$1,883m	$4,003m	$962m	

=== Critical and audience response ===
Director	Film	Rotten Tomatoes	Metacritic	CinemaScore
Rankin/Bass	The Hobbit (animated)	71% (17 reviews)		
Ralph Bakshi	The Lord of the Rings (animated)	48% (46 reviews)		
Rankin/Bass	The Return of the King (animated)	67% (15 reviews)		
Peter Jackson	The Lord of the Rings: The Fellowship of the Ring	92% (236 reviews)	92 (34 reviews)	A−
Peter Jackson	The Lord of the Rings: The Two Towers	95% (258 reviews)	87 (39 reviews)	A
Peter Jackson	The Lord of the Rings: The Return of the King	94% (280 reviews)	94 (41 reviews)	A+
Peter Jackson	The Hobbit: An Unexpected Journey	64% (302 reviews)	58 (40 reviews)	A
Peter Jackson	The Hobbit: The Desolation of Smaug	74% (251 reviews)	66 (44 reviews)	A−
Peter Jackson	The Hobbit: The Battle of the Five Armies	59% (265 reviews)	59 (46 reviews)	A−
Kenji Kamiyama	The Lord of the Rings: The War of the Rohirrim (animated)	49% (149 reviews)	54 (32 reviews)	B

== See also ==
- Adaptations of The Hobbit
- Adaptations of The Lord of the Rings
