= Adim (mythology) =

King of Egypt in medieval Islamic mythological traditions about Egypt

Adim is a son of Budasheer and a king of Egypt, according to the medieval Islamic mythology about Egypt. It is attested in the works of al-Maqrizi.

== Story ==
After the Great Flood, Adim consulted with his father's ghost, who told him how to distill drinking water from the salt water in a deep cave. He built the first installation for distilling fresh water from sea water in a deep vast cave.
