= Maureen Solomon =

Nigerian actress (born 1983)

- Born: Maureen Solomon; 23 December 1983 (age 42); Abia State
- Occupation: Actress
- Years active: 2001-2011
- Spouse: Mr. Okereke
- Children: 3

Maureen Solomon // (born 23 December 1983) is a Nigerian actress who during her active years in the Nigerian movie industry featured in over 80 Nigerian movies.

== Early life and education ==
Solomon was born in Abia state, Nigeria in Isuochi town where she acquired both primary and secondary school education and obtained both her First School Leaving Certificate and West African Senior School Certificate from Isuochi Primary and Secondary school in Abia State.

== Career ==
Solomon revealed in an interview that she started performing on stage while she was in elementary school and had always hoped to become a well-known actor. At the age of 17, Solomon made her acting debut in the Nigerian film business. with the movie titled Alternative which was directed by Lancelot Oduwa Imasuen. Solomon described her first movie audition which was for the movie Alternative as a mistake on the part of Nigerian movie director Lancelot Oduwa Imasuen who mistook her for one of the registered auditionees and gave her a script to memorize and later perform/render. Solomon revealed that in actuality she coincidentally just happened to be at audition venue at the time. Solomon received a call back the following day and was assigned a role of which she was paid ₦2000 for ($20, per 2001 exchange rate) Solomon quit the Nigerian movie industry in 2011.

== Personal life ==
Solomon in 2005 married Mr. Okereke, a medical doctor and they have two children together.

== Selected filmography ==
- Journey To Love (2026)
- Beauty in the Slum (2024) as Ifeoma
- Pressure (2023)
- What Love Means to a Man and a Woman (2022)
- Heart Of Stone (2010)
- Kiss The Dust (2008) as Sophia James
- Angel Of My Life (2007)
- Careless Soul (2007)
- Final War (2007) as Tina
- Help Me Out (2007)
- Men On Hard Way (2007) as Linda
- Total War (2007) as Tina
- Leap Of Faith (2006)
- The Lost Son (2006)
- The Snake Girl (2006) as Ekenma
- Tomorrow Lives Again (2006)
- Without Apology (2006)
- Baby Girl (2005)
- Blood Battle (2005)
- C.I.D (2005)
- Desperate Love (2005)
- Diamond Forever (2005)
- Forgiveness (2005)
- Love Is A Game (2005)
- Home Apart (2005)
- Marry Me (2005)
- My School Mother (2005)
- Red Light (2005)
- Rising Moon (2005)
- Songs of Sorrow (2005)
- Suicide Lovers (2005)
- Test Of Manhood (2005)
- Expensive Game (2005) as Maggie
- Coronation (2005)
- Police Woman (2004)
- Hope of Glory (2004) as Judith
- Super Love (2003) as Akudo
- Butterfly (2003)
- Not with My Daughter (2002) as Ada
- Dangerous Mood (2001)
