= Cynthia Okereke =

Nigerian actress and producer (1960–2023)

- Born: April 20, 1960
- Died: July 11, 2023 (aged 63)
- Occupation: Actress
- Years active: 1990–2023

Cynthia Okereke (April 20, 1960 – July 11, 2023) was a Nigerian actress and film producer who starred in Katakata (2021), Osuofia in London (2003), and Idemili (2014). She died on July 11, 2023.

== Career ==
Okereke began her acting career in the late 1990s and gained prominence with her role in the television series Ripples. She went on to appear in Nollywood films, often portraying motherly characters and matriarchal figures. Some of her notable films include Reggae Boys, Osuofia in London, and Second Burial, Nwando, A Fool At 40 and Katakata.

She was a member of the Actors Guild of Nigeria (AGN), Enugu Chapter, and was respected as one of the veteran actresses contributing to the growth of Nollywood.

== Kidnap incident ==
In July 2022, Okereke and fellow actor Clemson Cornel were kidnapped in Enugu State while returning from a movie location. The kidnappers reportedly demanded a ransom of $100,000. Both actors were released unharmed a few days later, after what the Actors Guild of Nigeria described as “efforts by security forces and support from the film community”.

== Death ==
Okereke died on 11 July 2023. Her death was confirmed by the Actors Guild of Nigeria, which noted that she died while sleeping. The president of the AGN, Emeka Rollas, mourned her death and described her as a "dedicated, committed, and hardworking actress".

== Filmography ==
=== Film ===
Year	Title	Role	Notes
1999	Oganigwe	Chioma	Main role
2001	Issakaba	Odogwu's Wife	Recurring role
2001	Mothering Sunday	Village Woman	Recurring role
2002	Evil-Doers	Cy Okere	Recurring role
2003	Total Regret		Recurring role
2003	Osuofia in London	Uremma	Main role
2003	Naomi	Adaugo	Main role
2003	Sister Mary	Uloaku	Recurring role
2003	Lion Finger	Agatha	Main role
2003	Lion Finger 2	Agatha	Recurring role
2003	Informant		Recurring role
2003	Price of the wicked	Ugodi	Main role
2003	Lagos Girls		Recurring role
2004	Osuofia in London2	Uremma	Main role
2004	Annabel	Nneoma	Main role
2004	Coronation		Recurring role
2004	Coronation 2		Recurring role
2004	Force Headquarters	Barrister Kate	Recurring role
2005	Eagle's Bride	Igwe Ojukwu's Lolo	Recurring role
2005	I Found You		Recurring role
2005	I Found You 2		Recurring role
2005	Reggae Boys		Recurring role
2005	Reggae Boys 2		Recurring role

== Awards and nominations ==
Year	Award	Category	Result	Ref.
2004	AMAA (African Movie Academy Award)	Best Supporting Actress.	Nominated	
2004	Africa Magic Viewers Choice Awards	Best Supporting Actress.	Won	
