= Clarion Chukwura =

Nigerian actress and humanitarian (born 1964)

Clarion Chukwurah-Abiola
- Born: Clara Nneka Oluwatoyin Folashade Chukwurah; 24 July 1964 (age 62); Lagos, Nigeria
- Education: Obafemi Awolowo University
- Occupation: Actress
- Years active: 1979–present
- Spouse: Anthony Boyd
- Children: Clarence Peters

Chief Clarion Chukwurah // (born Clara Nneka Oluwatoyin Folashade Chukwurah; 24 July 1964) is a Nigerian actress and humanitarian.

== Early life and education ==
Chukwurah was born as the only daughter in a family of four on 24 July 1964. She is from Anambra State. She attended nursery and primary school in Lagos before pursuing secondary education at Queen of the Rosary College, Onitsha. She later studied acting and speech at the Department of Dramatic Arts, Obafemi Awolowo University.

== Career ==
She began her career in acting in 1980 but became popular when she featured in the soap opera Mirror in the Sun. She was the first Nigerian to win the Best Actress category at the 1982 FESPACO film festival in Burkina Faso. She was recognised as a United Nations peace ambassador for her charity work across Africa.

== Personal life ==
Chukwura is the mother of music video director Clarence Peters, whom she had with Juju musician Sir Shina Peters. In 2016, Chukwura married Anthony Boyd, her third husband, and converted to her new husband's Jehovah's Witnesses faith. She has previously been married twice, to Tunde Abiola(MKO Abiola's younger brother) and Femi Odeneye.

== Television ==
- Bello's Way (1984)
- Mirror in the Sun (1984)
- Ripples (1989)
- Super Story (2001)
- Delilah (2016) as Sylvia Ambrose

== Filmography ==
Year	Title	Role
1979	Farewell to Babylon	
1984	Money Power	
1986	Fiery Force	
	Yemoja	
1994	Glamour Girls 2	Vera
	Remarkable night	
	Caught in the act	
2000	Lagidigba	Olori Parakoyi
2002	Valentino	Josy
2003	Abuja Connection	Jennifer
2003	Egg of Life	Priestess
2003	Emergency Wedding	Stella
2004	Danger Signal	Mrs. U.K. Morgan
2005	Days of Bondage	Issabela
2005	Ladies World	Angela
2005	Nothing for Nothing	Mama Nnukwu
2006	Abuja Top Ladies	Grace Benson
2006	In the Closet	Faye
2006	Desperate Women	Emilia
2007	Dry Scorpion	Agatha
2008	Chest to Chest	Agatha
2009	Darkest Day	Edna
2010	High Blood Pressure	
2014	Apaye	Yepayeye
2014	Igbotic love	
2014	Forbidden choice	Angela
2020	Efunsetan Aniwura	
2021	Amina	Zumbura
2021	Drastic Measures	Evelyn
2022	Beautiful People	
2022	Covenant	Jane
2022	Ozioma	Monica
2022	Nneoma	Nneoma
2023	Osariemen	

== Recognition ==
- The traditional title of Ada Eji Eje Mba I of Onitsha, Anambra State
- Legends of Nollywood award at the Nollywood at 20 Celebration
- 1982 Best Actress of the Year at All Africa Film Festival, Ougadagodou, Burkina Faso (won)
- 1997 Afro-Hollywood Best Actress Award for Glamour Girls (won)
- 2001 THEMA Best Supporting Actress (yoruba) award (won)
- 2001 Lebatino Film Festival, Mexico, award for best actress (won)
- 2001 THEMA Best supporting actress (won)
- 2004 Reel Award for Best Actress (won)
- 2014 Africa Movie Academy Awards for Best Actress in a Leading Role
- 2015 Golden Icons Academy Movie Awards - Lifetime Achievement Award
- 2019 Gathering of Africa's Best Awards (GAB Awards) - Special Recognition Award in the Arts
