= Kingsley Ogoro =

Nigerian film director (born 1965)

- Born: Kingsley Ogoro; August 29, 1965 (age 60)
- Years active: 1990–present

Kingsley Eloho Ogoro (born August 29, 1965), is a Nigerian film director, screenwriter, music producer and former dancer. He is best known for the 2003 film Osuofia in London starring Nkem Owoh, and has since worked mainly as a producer and director in the Nollywood film industry.

== Early life ==
Ogoro attended the University of Sokoto where he studied Banking & Finance, graduating in 1988, but remained interested in music despite his parents' disapproval. Prior to his university education, he reached the John Player Disco Dancing Championships finals, after which he began focusing on a music career as a producer.

== Personal life ==
Ogoro was previously married to former pop singer Esse Agesse. The pair have three children. Their eldest daughter, Ewoma Ogoro, was Miss Nigeria Ireland in 2012 and is now an engineer. Their second daughter, Mamobo Ogoro is a social entrepreneur in Ireland, she is the founder of GORM and presenter on NewstalkFM. Their youngest son Sean Ogoro is working and living in Ireland.

== Filmography ==
=== As producer ===
- The Widow (2005)
- Across the Niger (2004)
- Osuofia in London 2 (2004)
- Veno (2004)
- Dangerous Babe (2003)
- Osuofia in London (2003)

=== As director ===
- The Widow (2005)
- Osuofia in London 2 (2004)
- Veno (2004)
- Osuofia in London (2003)
- The Return (2003)

=== As screenwriter ===
- The Widow (2005)
- Osuofia in London 2 (2004)
- Osuofia in London (2003)

== See also ==
- List of Nigerian film producers
