= Andy Nwakalor =

- Citizenship: Nigerian
- Occupations: Film director; Screenwriter
- Known for: Rising Moon; Sins of Rachael
- Notable work: Rising Moon; Greatness; Final War; Total War; My Only Girl; Not with My Daughter
- Awards: Africa Movie Academy Award for Best Director (2006)

Andy Nwakalor is a Nollywood film director and screenwriter.

== Life ==
Nwakalor was the director of Rising Moon (2005). The movie won several Africa Movie Academy Awards, and Nwakalor won the Award for Best Director.

Nwakalor was also screenwriter for Emeka H. Umeasor's 2008 movie "Sins of Rachael". In 2010, he was among the Nigerian music and movie artistes declaring their support for Goodluck Jonathan in the 2011 Nigerian presidential election. He is the supervising director of The Unveiled Truth, a Christian soap opera which started in 2017.

== Filmography ==
- Greatness (2007)
- Final War (2007)
- Total War (2007)
- Sweet Sound (2006)
- My Only Girl (2006)
- Rising Moon (2005)
- Not with My Daughter (2002)
