= Samuel Gelfman =

American film producer (1931–2019)

- Born: May 30, 1931; Brooklyn, New York City, U.S.
- Died: August 15, 2019 (aged 88); Los Angeles, California, U.S.
- Education: Princeton University
- Occupation: Film producer
- Spouse: Jane Rosenberg Gelfman (divorced)
- Children: 3

Samuel Gelfman (May 30, 1931 – August 15, 2019) was an American film producer. He began his career by working for talent agent Candida Donadio, and he later worked for Cy Feuer and Ernest Martin. By the early 1970s, he had joined United Artists as vice president, where he worked on promoting films directed by Woody Allen and Sidney Lumet. He co-produced Caged Heat and Cockfighter with Roger Corman in 1974, and he produced Cannonball in 1976.
