= Eucharia Anunobi =

Nigerian actress, producer, and pastor (born 1965)

- Born: 27 May 1965 (age 61); Owerri, Nigeria
- Education: University of Nigeria; Institute of Management Technology, Enugu
- Occupation: Actress
- Years active: 1995-present

Eucharia Anunobi (//; born 27 May 1965) is a Nigerian actress, producer, and pastor. She is best known for her role in Abuja Connection (2003). She was a nominee of the Africa Magic Viewers' Choice Awards for Best Supporting Actress in a Movie or TV Series in 2020.

== Education ==
Anunobi hails from Owerri, Imo State, Southeast Nigeria, but was born in Victoria Island, Lagos, Nigeria. She completed her primary and secondary school education at St. George's Boys & Girls School Falomo Ikoyi and Dodan Barracks, respectively, before proceeding to the Institute of Management Technology, Enugu, where she graduated with a National Diploma in Mass Communication. She also holds a Bachelor of Arts degree after studying English Language at the University of Nigeria, Nsukka.

== Career ==
Anunobi came into the limelight for her role in the movie series Glamour Girls II in 1996 and has gone on to star in over 90 movies, including Abuja Connection and Letters to a Stranger. She is currently serving as an evangelist at a church in Egbeda, Lagos State. Anunobi lost the joy of an only son, Raymond Ekwu, whom she described as her best friend to complications arising from sickle cell anemia on 22 August 2017. He was aged 15. She is of the view that sex before marriage is important.

== Personal life ==
Eucharia Anunobi married Charles Ekwu in 2000 and had a son, Raymond Ekwu. They divorced after six years of marriage. Raymond died from sickle cell complications in 2017, aged 15. Following Anunobi's divorce from Charles, the actress filed a 100 million-naira lawsuit against him in 2010.

In 2015, Anunobi's father Felix died after a brief illness.

== Ministry ==
Eucharia Anunobi was ordained in the year 2012 by Pastor Psalm Okpe. She was ordained at Fresh Oil Ministry International, Egbeda, Lagos.

== Filmography ==
- The Way We Were (2024) as Mrs. Davies
- The Golden Child (2023) as Anna
- Bleeding Butterfly (2023) as Grace
- The Woman of Faith (2022) as Esther
- Man of God (2022) as Rev. Mrs. Gift Asuquo
- Obiye the Comforter (2022) as Akoche
- Foreigner's God (2022) as Nnebugo the Undying
- Elina (2021)
- Fulfilled (2021) as Ugodiya
- Ikemefuna (2021) as Mama J
- Small Chops (2020) as Mama B
- Our Jesus Story (2020)
- For Old Time Sake (2019) as Mrs. Omalu
- Code Wilo (2019)
- Jumbled (2019) as Mrs. Ezenwa
- The Foreigner's God (2018)
- Breaking Heart (2009) as Mrs. Gladys
- Heavy Storm (2009)
- Desire (2008) as Juliet's Mother
- Final Tussle (2008)
- My Darling Princess (2008) as Ijeoma
- Black Night in South America (2007) as Sussie
- Area Mama (2007)
- Big Hit (2007)
- Bird Flu (2007) as Paulina
- Confidential Romance (2007) as Lady B.
- Cover Up (2007) as Helen
- Desperate Sister (2007) as Edna
- Drug Baron (2007)
- Fine Things (2007)
- Letters to a Stranger (2007) as Mrs. Bankole
- Sacred Heart (2007)
- Short of Time (2007) as Evelyn
- Sister’s Heart (2007)
- Spiritual Challenge (2007)
- The Trinity (2007)
- Titanic Tussle (2007) as Stainless
- When You are Mine (2007) as Lady B.
- Women at Large (2007) as Vera
- 19 Macaulay Street (2006)
- Emotional Blunder (2006) as Jane
- Evil Desire (2006)
- Heritage of Sorrow (2006)
- Joy of a Mother (2006) as Amaka
- My Only Girl (2006) as Freddy
- Occultic Wedding (2006)
- Thanksgiving (2006) as Cynthia
- The Dreamer (2006)
- Unbreakable Affair (2006)
- 100% Husband (2005)
- Dangerous Blind Man (2005) as Gloria
- Dorathy My Love (2005) as Ify
- Extra Time (2005)
- Family Battle (2005)
- Heavy Storm (2005)
- Home Apart (2005)
- No Way Out (2005)
- Rings of Fire (2005)
- Second Adam (2005)
- Secret Affairs (2005)
- Shadows of Tears (2005)
- Sins of My Mother (2005)
- The Bank Manager (2005) as Nneka
- To Love a Stranger (2005)
- Torn Apart (2005)
- Total Disgrace (2005) as Sen. Julia
- Tricks of Women (2005) as Jacklyn
- Unexpected Mission (2005)
- War for War (2005)
- Deadly Kiss (2004) as Nancy Williams
- Deep Loss (2004)
- Diamond Lady 2: The Business Woman (2004)
- Expensive Game (2004) as Sophie
- Falling Apart (2004)
- For Real (2004) as Divine
- Home Sickness (2004) as Victoria
- Last Decision (2004)
- Love & Marriage (2004)
- Miss Nigeria (2004) as Mrs. Williams
- My Own Share (2004)
- Never Say Ever (2004) as Dr. Helen
- Not By Power (2004) as Ugonma
- Official Romance (2004)
- Price of Hatred (2004)
- The Maid (2004) Mrs. Williams
- Abuja Connection (2004) as Sophia
- Armageddon King (2003)
- Computer Girls (2003) as Madam Stainless
- Emotional Pain (2003) as Maureen
- Expensive Error (2003) as Nnenna
- Handsome (2003)
- Hot Lover (2003)
- Lagos Babes (2003)
- Mother’s Help (2003)
- Reckless Babes (2003)
- Show Bobo: The American Boys (2003) as Chikaodili
- Sister Mary (2003) as Nene
- Society Lady (2003)
- The Only Hope (2003)
- The Storm is Over (2003)
- What Women Want (2003)
- Evil-Doers (2002) as Justina
- Not with my Daughter (2002) as Oby
- Orange Girl (2002)
- Death Warrant (2001)
- Desperadoes (2001)
- August Meeting (2001)
- The Last Burial (2000) as Susan
- Benita 2 (1999)
- Heartless 2 (1999) as Rose
- Benita (1998)
- Heartless (1998) as Rose
- Died Wretched (1998) as Sarah
- Glamour Girls II (1996) as Anita
- Battle of Musanga (1996)
- Backstab (1995)
- Nneka the Pretty Serpent 2 (1995)
- Nneka the Pretty Serpent (1994)
