= Adim Williams =

Nigerian film director

- Born: Adim C. Williams; 1964 (age 61–62); Lagos, Nigeria
- Years active: 1994–
- Known for: Film directing
- Notable work: Desperate sister (2007); Too Late to Claim (2006); Royal Battle (2005); Millionaire's Daughter (2004); Women in Power (2005); Sharon Stone (2002); Temple of Justice (2008); Crisis in London (2020)

ADIM WILLIAMS is a prominent Nigerian film director recognized for his involvement in notable Nollywood productions such as Abuja Connection 2 and Abuja Connection 3.

He worked extensively in the Nollywood film industry since 2002, directing some 28 pictures by the end of 2006.

His film Joshua was the first Nollywood production ever to be introduced into the American DVD market, released in December 2005. He's among the notable movie actors featured in the movie "The Interview".

Adim Williams is a director and writer, known for Mr. Ibu in London (2004), Crying Angel (2005), and Valentino (2002).

Some of his movies

MR IBU IN LONDON

A poorly paid security guard who is always mocked hides inside a cargo container and finds himself homeless in the streets of London until surprisingly an old friend comes to his aid. Cast and crew include Charles Okocha, Mr Ibu, Rita Johnson, John Okafor, Nkiru Ughanze, Remy Ohanjiyan, Ishola Oshun and more.

== Filmography ==
As director

- Desperate sister (2007)
- Too Late to Claim (2006)
- Royal Battle (2005)
- Millionaire's Daughter (2004)
- Women in Power (2005)
- Sharon Stone (2002)
- Temple of Justice (2008)
- Crisis in London (2020)

As actor

- Broken Intentions (2021) as George
- Jealous Lovers (2003) as Uche
- Emergency Wedding (2003) as Barrister Williams
- Sharon Stone (2002) as Registrar
