= Emeka Ani =

Nigerian actor

- Born: 13 February 1956 (age 70)
- Occupations: Actor, director, producer
- Years active: 1989–present

Emeka Ani is a Nigerian actor, producer, and director.

== Personal life ==
In 2021, he solicited funds and support to pay for hospital bills and continuing health care following a stroke. He received six million naira from the religious leader Jeremiah Fufeyin.

== Filmography ==
- Witches(1998) as Malibe
- Karishika II (1999) as cult leader
- Issakaba (2000)
- The Last Burial (2000)
- Abuja Connection (2003) as Peter
- Desperate Billionaire (2005) as Spiritualist
- Kissing the Wind (2006)
- My American Nurse (2006) as Obasanjo
- Snake Girl (2006) as Ogbakaja
- The Snake Girl II (2006) as Ogbakaja
- Serpent in Paradise (2006)
- Serpent in Paradise II (2006)
- No More Love II (2007) as Great One
- 666 (Beware the End Is at Hand) 1 & 2 (2007) as Lucifer
- Church on Fire 1 & 2 (2008)
- Okoto the Messenger (2011) as Mr. Okorie
- Family Mistake
- Sometime in July (2018) as Lt. Col. Odogwu
- Ogbo Nke Ajuala (2020) as Ajuala
