= 2023 Plateau State gubernatorial election =

2023 gubernatorial election in Plateau State, Nigeria

- 18 March 2023
- Registered: 2,789,528
Nominee	Caleb Mutfwang	Nentawe Yilwatda	Patrick Dakum
Party	PDP	APC	LP
Running mate	Josephine Piyo	Pam Bot-mang	Edward Gyang Pwajok
Popular vote	525,299	481,400	60,310
Percentage	48.62%	44.55%	5.58%
Governor before election
Simon Lalong
APC
Elected Governor
Caleb Mutfwang
PDP

The 2023 Plateau State gubernatorial election was held on 18 March 2023, to elect the Governor of Plateau State, concurrent with elections to the Plateau State House of Assembly as well as twenty-seven other gubernatorial elections and elections to all other state houses of assembly. The election — which was postponed from its original 11 March date — will be held three weeks after the presidential election and National Assembly elections. Incumbent APC Governor Simon Lalong was term-limited and could not seek re-election to a third term. Caleb Mutfwang, a former Mangu Local Government Chairman, gained the office for the PDP by a margin of ~4% over APC nominee Nentawe Yilwatda.

Party primaries were scheduled for between 4 April and 9 June 2022 with the Peoples Democratic Party nominating Mutfwang on 25 May while the All Progressives Congress nominated Nentawe Yilwatda on 26 May. In August, former commissioner in Plateau State, Patrick Dakum — a withdrawn aspirant in the APC primary — won the nomination of the Labour Party in a rerun primary.

In the afternoon of 20 March, Mutfwang was declared the winner by INEC after results showed him winning about 525,000 votes (~49% of the vote) compared to Yilwatda's total of about 481,000 votes (~45% of the vote) while Dakum came a distant third place with roughly 60,000 votes (~6% of the vote). However, Yilwatda rejected the results and commenced a legal battle that initially succeeded as a Court of Appeal judgement in November overturned the result and declared Yilwatda as the rightful winner. However, the Supreme Court upheld the election of Mutfwang in a January 2024 ruling. Much like the election period, the post-election legal battles led to tensions across the state with sporadic protests and unrest.

== Electoral system ==
The Governor of Plateau State is elected using a modified two-round system. To be elected in the first round, a candidate must receive the plurality of the vote and over 25% of the vote in at least two-thirds of state local government areas. If no candidate passes this threshold, a second round will be held between the top candidate and the next candidate to have received a plurality of votes in the highest number of local government areas.

== Background ==
Plateau State is a diverse, agriculture-based state in the North Central; although it has vast natural resources, Plateau has faced issues in security as inter-ethnic violence and conflict between herders and farmers heavily affect the state. The overproliferation of weaponry and increased pressure for land along with failures in governance led to the worsening of these clashes in the years ahead of the election.

Politically, Plateau's 2019 elections were a mixed bag for both major parties. On the federal level, PDP nominee Atiku Abubakar narrowly won the state but it swung slightly towards Buhari; legislatively, the parties fairly evenly split the Senate seats and won House of Representatives seats. Statewise, Lalong won re-election by about 4% of the vote and the APC won a majority in the House of Assembly.

At the beginning of Lalong's second term, he announced that the administration would center its policy on infrastructure development, peace and community security, and sustainable economic growth. In terms of his performance, Lalong was commended for infrastructural development while being criticized for a poor response to increasingly deadly interethnic violence and denying opposition politicians access to government-owned media.

== Primary elections ==
The primaries, along with any potential challenges to primary results, were to take place between 4 April and 3 June 2022 but the deadline was extended to 9 June. An informal zoning gentlemen's agreement sets the Plateau Central Senatorial District may have the next governor as Plateau Central has not held the governorship since 2007. While the PDP has zoned its nomination to the central district, the APC did not zone its nomination; both parties' nominees came from the Central district.

=== All Progressives Congress ===
On 20 April 2022, the APC National Executive Committee announced the party's schedule for gubernatorial primaries, setting its expression of interest form price at ₦10 million and nomination form price at ₦40 million with a 50% nomination form discount for candidates younger than 40 while women and candidates with disabilities get free nomination forms. Forms were to be sold from 26 April to 6 May until the deadline was later extended to 10 May then 12 May. After the submission of nomination forms by 13 May, candidates were screened by a party committee on 14 and 15 May while 16 May was the date for the screening appeal process. Ward congresses and LGA congresses were set for between 7 and 9 May to elect delegates for the primary. Candidates approved by the screening process advanced to a primary set for 26 May, in concurrence with other APC gubernatorial primaries; challenges to the result could be made the next day.

Ahead of the primary in May 2022, accusations of imposition divided the state APC as eighteen of nineteen gubernatorial candidates accused incumbent Governor Simon Lalong and his inner circle of unduly supporting the nineteenth candidate, former INEC official Nentawe Yilwatda. The protesting aspirants released a statement threatening to collectively leave the APC if the state party leadership allows Lalong "to subjugate the collective will of members of APC by imposing a candidate on members of the party." After that month's ward congresses, further accusations were tabled against Lalong as a group said he hijacked the congresses to get favourable delegates for the state primary. In the days before the primary, most candidates dropped out in protest of the alleged imposition of Yilwatda resulting in a primary with only four candidates. During the primary, even the remaining opponents to Yilwatda staged a walkout as the votes were cast; Yilwatda won with nearly 90% of the delegates' votes. As opposition to his nomination continued, Yilwatda commenced his general election campaign and selected Pam Bot-mang—the Commissioner of Works and son of former Deputy Governor Michael Bot-mang—as his running mate. By July, Yilwatda's internal party opponents sued to disqualify his candidacy.

==== Nominated ====
- Nentawe Yilwatda: former INEC Resident Electoral Commissioner for Benue State
  - Running mate—Pam Bot-mang: Commissioner of Works and son of former Deputy Governor Michael Bot-mang

==== Eliminated in primary ====
- David Victor Dimka: former civil servant
- Garba Pwul: a barrister and Senior Advocate of Nigeria
- Sonni Gwanle Tyoden: Deputy Governor (2015–present) and former Vice Chancellor of the University of Jos (2006–2011)

==== Withdrew ====
- Pukat Shehu Barde: former civil servant
- Sunday Biggs: civil servant
- Fitka Bilshakka: surveyor
- Dakas Clement Dakas: barrister
- Patrick Dakum: doctor, CEO of the Institute of Human Virology Nigeria, and former Commissioner for Information
- Shem Yaute Damisa: former state Accountant General
- Hezekiah Ayuba Dimka: Senator for Plateau Central (2019–present)
- Amos Gizo: former House of Representatives member for Kanke/Pankshin/Kanam
- Kizito Dankat Gukas: former civil servant
- Danlami Lenkop: medical doctor
- Yohana Margif: businessman (defected prior to the primary to successfully run in the LP gubernatorial primary)
- Johnson Podar: businessman
- Danyaro Dakon Sarpiya: federal government staffer
- Sipak Shase’et: veterinarian
- Geoffrey Yilleng: former Kanke Local Government Deputy Chairman

==== Declined ====
- Manji Gontori: 2019 APC Plateau Central senatorial candidate
- Danlami Lenkwot: a doctor and former Kanke Local Government Chairman

==== Results ====
Candidates' vote share
1. Nentawe Yilwatda (87.4%)
2. Patrick Dakum (7.62%)
3. Other candidates (5.01%)

APC primary results
Party	Candidate	Votes	%
APC	Nentawe Yilwatda	803	87.38%
APC	Patrick Dakum (withdrawn)	70	7.62%
APC	Sonni Gwanle Tyoden	25	2.72%
APC	David Victor Dimka	7	0.76%
APC	Hezekiah Ayuba Dimka (withdrawn)	6	0.65%
APC	Danyaro Dakon Sarpiya (withdrawn)	4	0.43%
APC	Fitka Bilshakka (withdrawn)	2	0.22%
APC	Garba Pwul	2	0.22%
APC	Sunday Biggs (withdrawn)	0	0.00%
Total votes		919	100.00%

=== People's Democratic Party ===
In April 2022, Plateau PDP State Executive Committee announced that the party had zoned their gubernatorial nomination to Plateau Central Senatorial District.

On 16 March 2022, the national PDP announced its gubernatorial primaries' schedule, setting its expression of interest form price at ₦1 million and the nomination form price at ₦20 million with a 50% discount for candidates between 25 and 30. Forms were to be sold until 1 April but the party later extended the deadline four times before reaching a final deadline of 22 April. After the submission of nomination forms by 25 April, candidates were screened by a party committee on 28 April while 2 May was the rescheduled date for the screening appeal process. Ward congresses were set for 29 April and LGA congresses were rescheduled for 10 May to elect delegates for the primary. Candidates approved by the screening process advanced to a primary set for 25 May, in concurrence with all other PDP gubernatorial primaries; challenges to the result could be made in the following days.

On the primary date, four candidates withdrew while the other fourteen candidates continued to an indirect primary at the Langfield Event Centre in Jos that continued into the early morning of 26 May. It resulted in Caleb Mutfwang emerging as nominee after announced results showed Mutfwang winning with over 42% of the delegates' votes. In the weeks after the primary, Mutfwang held reconciliatory meetings with his former opponents with the intent of ensuring party unity. On 21 June, Mutfwang announced Josephine Chundung Piyo—a fellow former Local Government Chairperson—as his running mate at the State Party Secretariat in Jos.

==== Nominated ====
- Caleb Mutfwang: former Mangu Local Government Chairman
  - Running mate—Josephine Chundung Piyo: former Riyom Local Government Chairwoman and former House of Assembly member

==== Eliminated in primary ====
- Jonathan Sunday Akuno
- Jonathan Aminu: former House of Representatives member for Bokkos/Mangu
- Mazadu Dader Bako: geoscientist
- Chief Kefas Wungak Ropshik
- Shedrack Best: 2019 PDP gubernatorial candidate
- Alfred Dapal: geologist
- Dauda Wuritka Gotring: economist
- Jerry Gushop: agriculturalist
- Bagudu Hirse: 2015 LP gubernatorial nominee and former Minister of State for Foreign Affairs
- Satu Jatau: economist
- Alex Ladan: 2019 ANN gubernatorial nominee
- Timothy Nantong
- David Shikfu Parradang: former Nigeria Immigration Service Comptroller-General and 2019 PDP Plateau Central senatorial nominee
- Dipak Shawarapshaka
- John Sunday Sura: retired Army brigadier general

==== Withdrew ====
- Latep Dabang: former state APC Chairman
- Timothy Golu: former House of Representatives member for Pankshin/Kanke/Kanam (2011–2019) and former House of Assembly member for Kanke
- Vincent Nanle: pastor
- Jack Yakubu Pam

==== Results ====
Candidates' vote share
1. Caleb Mutfwang (42.5%)
2. Chief Kefas Wungak Ropshik (19.1%)
3. Alfred Dapal (15.5%)
4. Dauda Wuritka Gotring (14.8%)
5. Other candidates (8.10%)

PDP primary results
Party	Candidate	Votes	%
PDP	Caleb Mutfwang	252	42.50%
PDP	Kefas Ropshik	113	19.05%
PDP	Alfred Dapal	92	15.51%
PDP	Dauda Wuritka Gotring	88	14.84%
PDP	Jonathan Sunday Akuno	16	2.70%
PDP	Satu Jatau	9	1.52%
PDP	Jerry Gushop	6	1.01%
PDP	Shedrack Best	4	0.67%
PDP	David Shikfu Parradang	4	0.67%
PDP	Mazadu Dader Bako	3	0.51%
PDP	John Sunday Sura	3	0.51%
PDP	Alex Ladan	2	0.34%
PDP	Bagudu Hirse	1	0.17%
PDP	Ephraim Lenka Dewa	0	0.00%
Total votes		593	100.00%
Invalid or blank votes		8	N/A
Turnout		601	Unknown

=== Minor parties ===
- Ankara Michael Umaru (Accord)
  - Running mate: Samuel Nandom
- Yibaikas Amos Adamu (Action Alliance)
  - Running mate: James Pam Dauda
- Sani Dawop (Action Democratic Party)
  - Running mate: Isaac Rwang Dalyop
- Aminu Muhammad Hadi (Action Peoples Party)
  - Running mate: Esther Kachallom Dung
- George Duwa Dimka (African Action Congress)
  - Running mate: Lucas Emmanuel Nshem
- Solomon Nandy Chendan (African Democratic Congress)
  - Running mate: Gyang Pam Chollom
- Mohammad Abdullahi Dan Baba (Allied Peoples Movement)
  - Running mate: Zulaikha Abdullahi Aliyu
- Samuel Abashe (All Progressives Grand Alliance)
  - Running mate: Rovina Richard Ajiya
- Ibrahim Abdullahi (Boot Party)
  - Running mate: David Salome
- Patrick Dakum (Labour Party)
  - Running mate: Edward Gyang Pwajok
- Alfred Dabwam (New Nigeria Peoples Party)
  - Running mate: Abdullahi G. Ango
- Francis Kwapdimma Ritshak (National Rescue Movement)
  - Running mate: Daniel David Fom
- Luka Panpe Yakubu (People's Redemption Party)
  - Running mate: Samson Pam
- Ponyah Ibrahim Binchak (Social Democratic Party)
  - Running mate: Job Jack Bot
- Butdangman Gontori (Young Progressives Party)
  - Running mate: Ishaya Chuwang Pam
- Samuel Langen Kompial (Zenith Labour Party)
  - Running mate: Moses Simi

== Campaign ==
The major parties' nominees spent the months of June and July 2022 focusing on the aftermath of party primaries. While Mutfwang held reconciliatory meetings with his former primary opponents and claimed to have unified the state PDP, the alleged imposition of Yilwatda by Lalong precluded reconciliation efforts within the state APC as losing primary candidates formed a factional forum with other aggrieved party members in late July 'to protest the injustice meted out to them during the party primaries.' As the focus shifted the general election campaign itself, analysts noted potential dynamics including the APC infighting along with the experience of both Mutfwang and Yilwatda in addition to the more prominent minor party nominees—Sani Dawop (ADP), Samuel Abashe (APGA), Patrick Dakum (LP), and Luka Panpe Yakubu (PRP). However, August brought reports of internal crisis in the PDP as rival blocs supportive of either former Governor Jonah Jang or former Senator Jeremiah Useni ratcheted up their dispute amid the national PDP Atiku Abubakar vs. Ezenwo Nyesom Wike crisis.

By November, analysis focused on the power of the APC's incumbency while also noting ethnic and regional dynamics. The next month, pundits noted continued criticism of Yilwatda due to his alleged primary imposition by Lalong along with allegations that Mutfwang did not pay civil servant salaries during his tenure as local government chairman. In the new year, reporting labeled Dakum as a major candidate due to the rise of the state LP and the conclusion of the legal dispute over the LP nomination. With the election's new framing as a three-way contest, punditry focused on each candidate's strengths and weaknesses: for Dakum, the popularity of Peter Obi—the LP presidential nominee—greatly helped his campaign viability but the party still lacks a substantial overarching structure in the state; for Mutfwang, his grassroots network was reportedly strong but the PDP crises had greatly hurt his campaign; and for Yilwatda, his personality and APC incumbency were categorized as boosts but the party crisis and APC unpopularity worked against him.

Much of the last stretch of campaigning was dominated by attention on the presidential election on 25 February. In the election, Plateau State voted for Peter Obi (LP); Obi won the state with 42.9% of the vote, beating Bola Tinubu (APC) at 28.2% and Atiku Abubakar (PDP) at 22.4%. With Obi's performance boosting his chances and a favorable Supreme Court ruling that affirmed his candidacy, Dakum gained momentum in the final weeks of campaigning. At the same time, reports noted the competitiveness of the election and the LP's downballot weakness along with Lalong's own senatorial loss.

== Projections ==
Source	Projection	As of
Africa Elects (Note: AfricaElects projections predict the likelihood of a candidate winning a state by categorizing a state as "Safe" for exceedingly likely, "Likely" for somewhat likely, and "Lean" for least likely. If no clear determination could be made, states are categorized as "tossups".)	Tossup	17 March 2023
Enough is Enough- SBM Intelligence (Note: EiE-SBM projections predict which candidates will win states.)	Mutfwang	2 March 2023

== Conduct ==
=== Electoral timetable ===
On 26 February 2022, the Independent National Electoral Commission released the timetable, setting out key dates and deadlines for the election. Months later on 27 May 2022, INEC made a slight revision to the timetable, allowing parties extra time to conduct primaries.

- 28 February 2022 – Publication of Notice of Election
- 4 April 2022 – First day for the conduct of party primaries
- 9 June 2022 (Note: The original deadline was 3 June; however, INEC pushed it back to 9 June at the behest of parties.) – Final day for the conduct of party primaries, including the resolution of disputes arising from them
- 1 July 2022 – First day for submission of nomination forms to INEC via the online portal
- 15 July 2022 – Final day for submission of nomination forms to INEC via the online portal
- 12 October 2022 – Commencement of the official campaign period
- 16 March 2023 (Note: The original deadline was 9 March; however, INEC pushed it back to 16 March.) – Final day of the official campaign period

== General election ==
=== Results ===
2023 Plateau State gubernatorial election
Party	Candidate	Votes	%
A	Ankara Michael Umaru		
AA	Yibaikas Amos Adamu		
ADP	Sani Dawop		
APP	Aminu Muhammad Hadi		
AAC	George Duwa Dimka		
ADC	Solomon Nandy Chendan		
APM	Mohammad Abdullahi Dan Baba		
APC	Nentanwe Yilwatda Goshwe		
APGA	Samuel Abashe		
BP	Ibrahim Abdullahi		
LP	Patrick Dakum		
New Nigeria Peoples Party	Alfred Dabwam		
NRM	Francis Kwapdimma Ritshak		
PDP	Caleb Mutfwang		
PRP	Luka Panpe Yakubu		
SDP	Ponyah Ibrahim Binchak		
YPP	Butdangman Gontori		
ZLP	Samuel Langen Kompial		
Total votes			100.00%
Invalid or blank votes			N/A
Turnout			

==== By senatorial district ====
The results of the election by senatorial district.

Senatorial District	Nentawe Yilwatda APC		Caleb Mutfwang PDP		Others		Total Valid Votes
Senatorial District	Votes	Percentage	Votes	Percentage	Votes	Percentage	Total Valid Votes
Plateau Central Senatorial District (Note: Comprising the local government areas of Bokkos, Mangu, Pankshin, Kanke, and Kanam.)	TBD	%	TBD	%	TBD	%	TBD
Plateau North Senatorial District (Note: Comprising the local government areas of Barkin Ladi, Bassa, Jos East, Jos North, Jos South, and Riyom.)	TBD	%	TBD	%	TBD	%	TBD
Plateau South Senatorial District (Note: Comprising the local government areas of Langtang North, Langtang South, Mikang, Qua'an Pan, Shendam, and Wase.)	TBD	%	TBD	%	TBD	%	TBD
Totals	TBD	%	TBD	%	TBD	%	TBD

==== By federal constituency ====
The results of the election by federal constituency.

Federal Constituency	Nentawe Yilwatda APC		Caleb Mutfwang PDP		Others		Total Valid Votes
Federal Constituency	Votes	Percentage	Votes	Percentage	Votes	Percentage	Total Valid Votes
Barkin Ladi/Riyom Federal Constituency (Note: Comprising the local government areas of Barkin Ladi and Riyom.)	TBD	%	TBD	%	TBD	%	TBD
Bokkos/Mangu Federal Constituency (Note: Comprising the local government areas of Bokkos and Mangu.)	TBD	%	TBD	%	TBD	%	TBD
Jos North/Bassa Federal Constituency (Note: Comprising the local government areas of Bassa and Jos North.)	TBD	%	TBD	%	TBD	%	TBD
Jos South/Jos East Federal Constituency (Note: Comprising the local government areas of Jos East and Jos South.)	TBD	%	TBD	%	TBD	%	TBD
Kanke/Pankshin/Kanam Federal Constituency (Note: Comprising the local government areas of Kanam, Kanke, and Pankshin.)	TBD	%	TBD	%	TBD	%	TBD
Langtang North/Langtang South Federal Constituency (Note: Comprising the local government areas of Langtang North and Langtang South.)	TBD	%	TBD	%	TBD	%	TBD
Mikang/Qua'an/Pan/Shendam Federal Constituency (Note: Comprising the local government areas of Mikang, Qua'an Pan, and Shendam.)	TBD	%	TBD	%	TBD	%	TBD
Wase Federal Constituency (Note: Comprising the local government areas of Wase.)	TBD	%	TBD	%	TBD	%	TBD
Totals	TBD	%	TBD	%	TBD	%	TBD

==== By local government area ====
The results of the election by local government area.

LGA	Nentawe Yilwatda APC		Caleb Mutfwang PDP		Others		Total Valid Votes	Turnout Percentage
LGA	Votes	Percentage	Votes	Percentage	Votes	Percentage	Total Valid Votes	Turnout Percentage
Barkin Ladi	TBD	%	TBD	%	TBD	%	TBD	%
Bassa	TBD	%	TBD	%	TBD	%	TBD	%
Bokkos	TBD	%	TBD	%	TBD	%	TBD	%
Jos East	TBD	%	TBD	%	TBD	%	TBD	%
Jos North	TBD	%	TBD	%	TBD	%	TBD	%
Jos South	TBD	%	TBD	%	TBD	%	TBD	%
Kanam	TBD	%	TBD	%	TBD	%	TBD	%
Kanke	TBD	%	TBD	%	TBD	%	TBD	%
Langtang North	TBD	%	TBD	%	TBD	%	TBD	%
Langtang South	TBD	%	TBD	%	TBD	%	TBD	%
Mangu	TBD	%	TBD	%	TBD	%	TBD	%
Mikang	TBD	%	TBD	%	TBD	%	TBD	%
Pankshin	TBD	%	TBD	%	TBD	%	TBD	%
Qua'an Pan	TBD	%	TBD	%	TBD	%	TBD	%
Riyom	TBD	%	TBD	%	TBD	%	TBD	%
Shendam	TBD	%	TBD	%	TBD	%	TBD	%
Wase	TBD	%	TBD	%	TBD	%	TBD	%
Totals	TBD	%	TBD	%	TBD	%	TBD	%

== See also ==
- 2023 Nigerian elections
- 2023 Nigerian gubernatorial elections
