= 2023 Nigerian Senate elections in Plateau State =

2023 Senate elections in Plateau

- 25 February 2023

All 3 Plateau State seats in the Senate of Nigeria
	Majority party	Minority party
Party	APC	PDP
Last election	2	1
Seats before	2	1
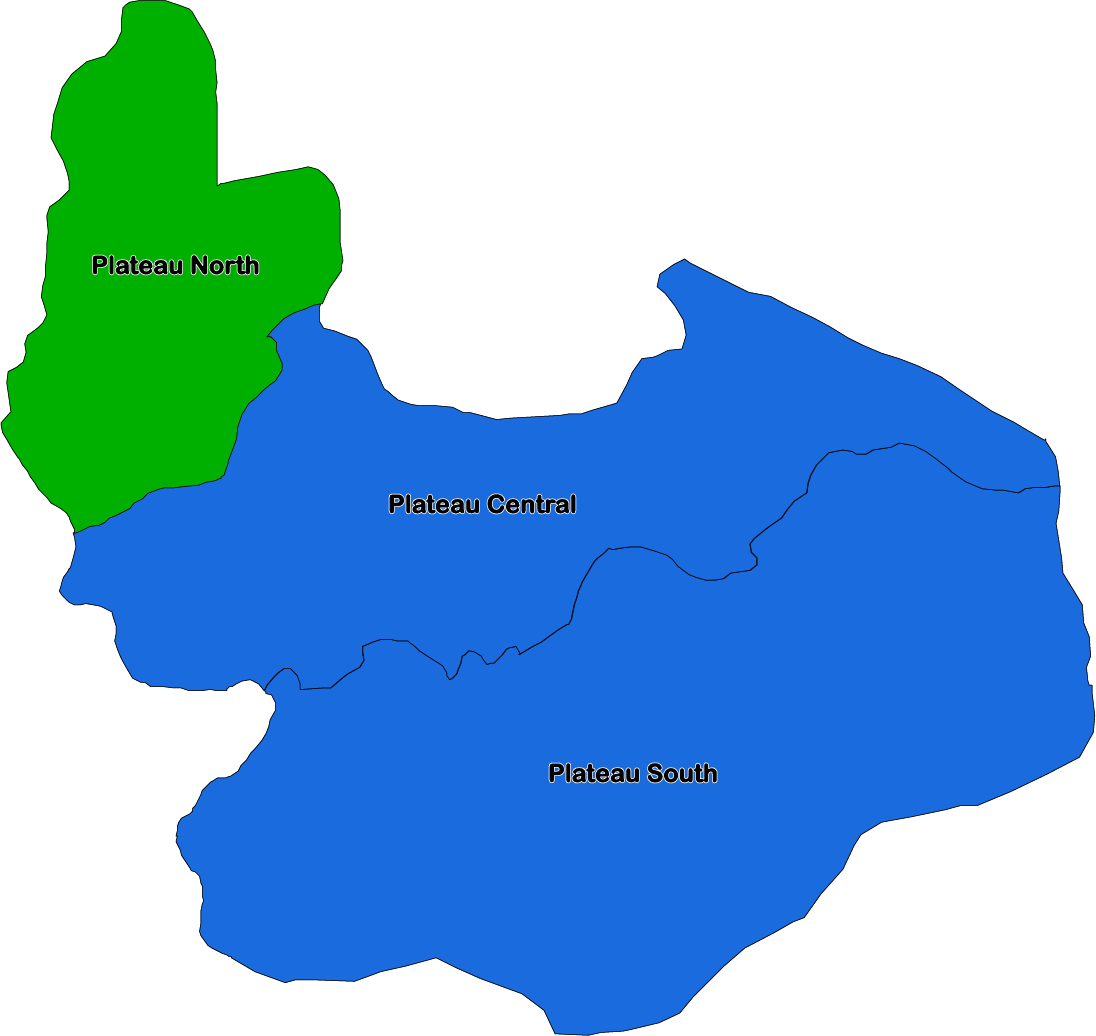
- APC incumbent retiring or withdrew from primary PDP incumbent lost renomination

The 2023 Nigerian Senate elections in Plateau State will be held on 25 February 2023, to elect the 3 federal Senators from Plateau State, one from each of the state's three senatorial districts. The elections will coincide with the 2023 presidential election, as well as other elections to the Senate and elections to the House of Representatives; with state elections being held two weeks later. Primaries were held between 4 April and 9 June 2022.

== Background ==
In the previous Senate elections, none of the three incumbent senators were reelected as all three retired from the Senate. In the Central district, Hezekiah Ayuba Dimka held the seat for the APC with 48% of the vote while Ignatius Datong Longjan gained the South district for the APC with 51%. In the North district, Istifanus Gyang held the seat for the PDP with 58% of the vote. The senatorial results were an example of slight APC gains in the state as the party also claimed a House of Representatives seat. Additionally, the APC won a majority in the House of Assembly and incumbent Governor Simon Lalong won re-election in the gubernatorial election. However, Abubakar narrowly won the state in the presidential election.

== Overview ==
Affiliation	Party		Total
Affiliation	APC	PDP	Total
Previous Election	2	1	3
Before Election	2	1	3
After Election	TBD	TBD	3

== Summary ==
District	Incumbent		Results	
District	Incumbent	Party	Status	Candidates
Plateau Central	Hezekiah Ayuba Dimka	APC	Incumbent retired New member elected APC hold	▌ ✓ Diket Plang (APC); ▌G. Y. Gotom (PDP)
Plateau North	Istifanus Gyang	PDP	Incumbent lost renomination New member elected PDP hold	▌Chris Giwa (APC); ▌ ✓ Simon Mwadkwon (PDP)
Plateau South	Nora Daduut	APC	Incumbent withdrew from primary New member elected PDP gain	▌Simon Lalong (APC); ▌ ✓ Napoleon Bali (PDP)

== Plateau Central ==
2023 Plateau Central Senatorial District election
- 25 February 2023
Nominee	Diket Plang	G. Y. Gotom
Party	APC	PDP
Senator before election
Hezekiah Ayuba Dimka
APC
Elected Senator
TBD

The Plateau Central Senatorial District covers the local government areas of Bokkos, Mangu, Pankshin, Kanke, and Kanam. Incumbent Hezekiah Ayuba Dimka (APC), who was elected with 48.4% of the vote in 2019, is seeking re-election. In March 2022, Dimka announced that he would run for governor of Plateau State instead of seeking re-election; he eventually withdrew from the APC gubernatorial primary.

=== General election ===
==== Results ====
2023 Plateau Central Senatorial District election
Party	Candidate	Votes	%
ADP	Katnanka John Kanzum		
ADC	Manasseh Damulak		
APC	Diket Plang		
LP	Garba Pwul		
NRM	Tangtu Ayuba Mwansat		
New Nigeria Peoples Party	Emmanuel Jonah Yilluk		
PDP	G. Y. Gotom		
SDP	Leonard Dilkon		
ZLP	Longgagal Isaac		
Total votes			100.00%
Invalid or blank votes			N/A
Turnout			

== Plateau North ==
2023 Plateau North Senatorial District election
- 25 February 2023
Nominee	Chris Giwa	Simon Mwadkwon
Party	APC	PDP
Senator before election
Istifanus Gyang
PDP
Elected Senator
TBD

The Plateau North Senatorial District covers the local government areas of Barkin Ladi, Bassa, Jos East, Jos North, Jos South, and Riyom. Incumbent Istifanus Gyang (PDP), who was elected with 58.1% of the vote in 2019, sought re-election but lost renomination.

=== General election ===
==== Results ====
2023 Plateau North Senatorial District election
Party	Candidate	Votes	%
AA	Mohammed Abdullahi Mohammed		
ADP	Pam Mwadkon Dachungyang		
ADC	Samuel Pam Gyang		
APC	Chris Giwa		
APM	Abdulhadi Nasiru Hamisu		
LP	Yaya Zi Gyang		
NRM	Kumusu Eleazar Ahoro		
New Nigeria Peoples Party	Yakub Muhammad Shafiu		
PRP	Suleiman Yahaya-Kwande		
PDP	Simon Mwadkwon		
SDP	Uba Mammn Ibrahim		
ZLP	Paul Francis		
Total votes			100.00%
Invalid or blank votes			N/A
Turnout			

== Plateau South ==
2023 Plateau South Senatorial District election
- 25 February 2023
Nominee	Simon Lalong	Napoleon Bali
Party	APC	PDP
Senator before election
Nora Daduut
APC
Elected Senator
TBD

The Plateau South Senatorial District covers the local government areas of Langtang North, Langtang South, Mikang, Qua'an Pan, Shendam, and Wase. In 2019, Ignatius Datong Longjan (APC) was elected to the seat with 51.2% of the vote but he died in February 2020. In the ensuing December 2020 by-election, Nora Daduut (APC) was elected with 53.4% of the vote; she initially opted to seek re-election before withdrawing from the APC primary.

=== Campaign ===
Reporting on the campaign noted that Lalong spent a significant part of the campaign season traveling nationwide with for Tinubu presidential campaign; thus he had not spent much of the campaign period in the district.

=== General election ===
==== Results ====
2023 Plateau South Senatorial District election
Party	Candidate	Votes	%
AA	Boniface Nietlong		
AAC	Bartho Donglong Nyelong		
ADC	Zira Manasseh Paul		
APC	Simon Lalong		
LP	Tobias Nda		
New Nigeria Peoples Party	Napgan Timlok Fyenda		
PRP	Abdulkarim Nimlang		
PDP	Napoleon Bali		
SDP	Ponfa Emmanuel Ogah		
Total votes			100.00%
Invalid or blank votes			N/A
Turnout			

== See also ==
- 2023 Nigerian Senate election
- 2023 Nigerian elections
- 2023 Plateau State elections
