= 2023 Nigerian presidential election in Plateau State =

- 25 February 2023
- Registered: 2,789,528
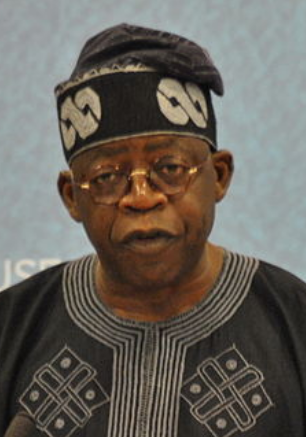

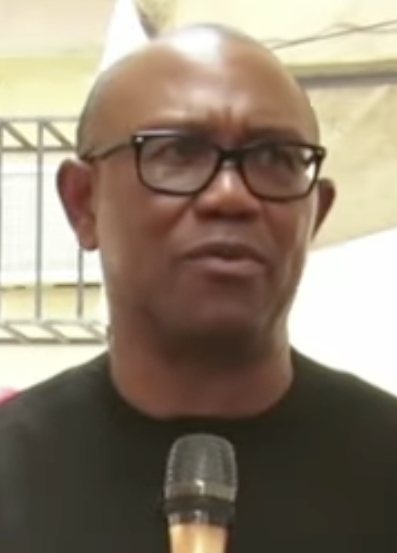

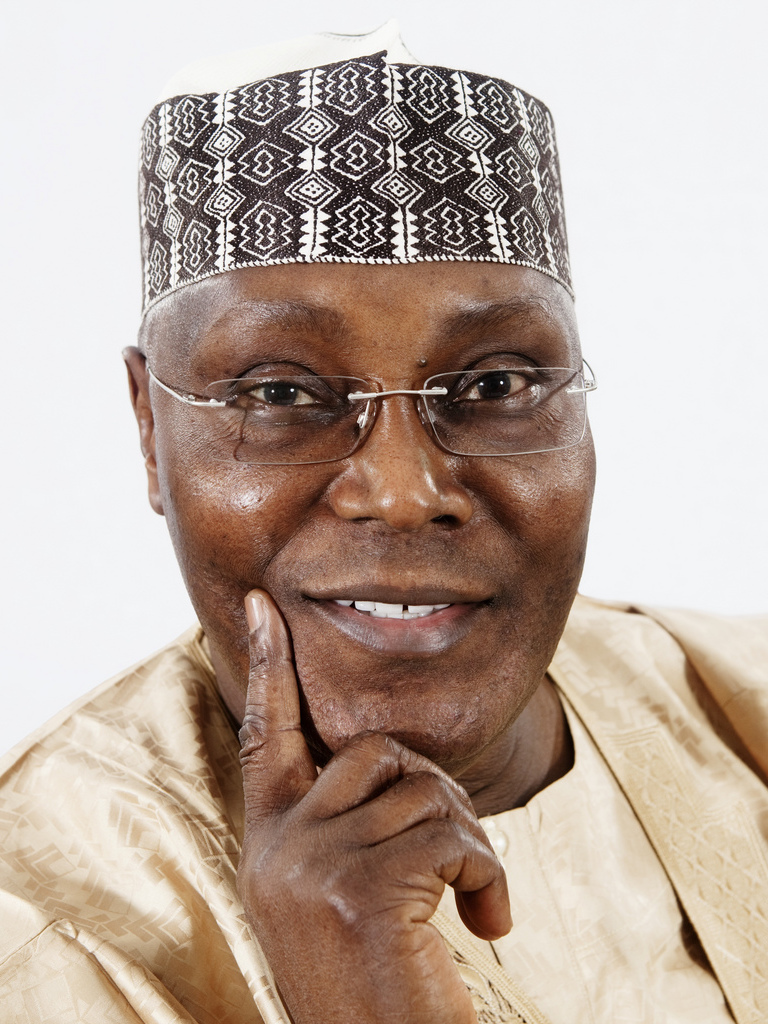
Nominee	Bola Tinubu	Peter Obi
Party	APC	LP
Home state	Lagos	Anambra
Running mate	Kashim Shettima	Yusuf Datti Baba-Ahmed
Nominee	Rabiu Kwankwaso	Atiku Abubakar
Party	New Nigeria Peoples Party	PDP
Home state	Kano	Adamawa
Running mate	Isaac Idahosa	Ifeanyi Okowa
President before election
Muhammadu Buhari
APC
Elected President
TBD

The 2023 Nigerian presidential election in Plateau State will be held on 25 February 2023 as part of the nationwide 2023 Nigerian presidential election to elect the president and vice president of Nigeria. Other federal elections, including elections to the House of Representatives and the Senate, will also be held on the same date while state elections will be held two weeks afterward on 11 March.

== Background ==
Plateau State is a diverse, agriculture-based state in the North Central; although it has vast natural resources, Plateau has faced issues in security as inter-ethnic violence and conflict between herders and farmers heavily affect the state. The overproliferation of weaponry and increased pressure for land along with failures in governance led to the worsening of these clashes in the years ahead of the election.

The 2019 Plateau elections were mixed for both major parties. On the federal level, PDP nominee Atiku Abubakar won the state by 8% but it swung slightly towards Buhari; legislatively, the parties fairly evenly split the Senate seats and House of Representatives seats. Statewise, incumbent APC Governor Simon Lalong won re-election by about 4% of the vote and the APC won a majority in the House of Assembly.

== Polling ==
Polling organisation/client	Fieldwork date	Sample size					Others	Undecided	Undisclosed	Not voting
Polling organisation/client	Fieldwork date	Sample size	Tinubu APC	Obi LP	Kwankwaso NNPP	Abubakar PDP	Others	Undecided	Undisclosed	Not voting
Nextier (Plateau crosstabs of national poll)	27 January 2023	N/A	8.7%	39.1%	–	46.4%	–	5.8%	–	–
SBM Intelligence for EiE (Plateau crosstabs of national poll)	22 January-6 February 2023	N/A	8%	69%	1%	14%	1%	7%	–	–

== Projections ==
Source	Projection		As of
Africa Elects (Note: Africa Elects projections predict the likelihood of a candidate winning a state by categorizing a state as "Safe" for exceedingly likely, "Likely" for somewhat likely, and "Lean" for least likely. If no clear determination could be made, states are categorized as "tossups".)	Lean Obi		24 February 2023
Dataphyte (Note: Dataphyte projections predict candidates' projected votal shares in each state.)
Dataphyte	Tinubu:	33.02%	11 February 2023
Dataphyte	Obi:	29.97%	11 February 2023
Dataphyte	Abubakar:	20.12%	11 February 2023
Dataphyte	Others:	16.89%	11 February 2023
Enough is Enough- SBM Intelligence (Note: EiE-SBM projections predict which candidates will win states.)	Obi		17 February 2023
SBM Intelligence (Note: SBM projections predict which candidates will win states or, if no determination could be made, categorizes states as "Too close to call" (TCC).)	Obi		15 December 2022
ThisDay (Note: ThisDay projections predict candidates' projected votal shares in each state.)
ThisDay	Tinubu:	10%	27 December 2022
ThisDay	Obi:	35%	27 December 2022
ThisDay	Kwankwaso:	5%	27 December 2022
ThisDay	Abubakar:	35%	27 December 2022
ThisDay	Others/Undecided:	40%	27 December 2022
The Nation (Note: The Nation projections predict which candidates will win states or, if no determination could be made, categorizes states as "Battlegrounds.")	Battleground		12-19 February 2023

== General election ==
=== Results ===
2023 Nigerian presidential election in Plateau State
Party	Candidate	Votes	%
A	Christopher Imumolen		
AA	Hamza al-Mustapha		
ADP	Yabagi Sani		
APP	Osita Nnadi		
AAC	Omoyele Sowore		
ADC	Dumebi Kachikwu		
APC	Bola Tinubu		
APGA	Peter Umeadi		
APM	Princess Chichi Ojei		
BP	Sunday Adenuga		
LP	Peter Obi		
NRM	Felix Johnson Osakwe		
New Nigeria Peoples Party	Rabiu Kwankwaso		
PRP	Kola Abiola		
PDP	Atiku Abubakar		
SDP	Adewole Adebayo		
YPP	Malik Ado-Ibrahim		
ZLP	Dan Nwanyanwu		
Total votes			100.00%
Invalid or blank votes			N/A
Turnout			

==== By senatorial district ====
The results of the election by senatorial district.

Senatorial District	Bola Tinubu APC		Atiku Abubakar PDP		Peter Obi LP		Rabiu Kwankwaso NNPP		Others		Total valid votes
Senatorial District	Votes	%	Votes	%	Votes	%	Votes	%	Votes	%	Total valid votes
Plateau Central Senatorial District (Note: Comprising the local government areas of Bokkos, Mangu, Pankshin, Kanke, and Kanam.)	TBD	%	TBD	%	TBD	%	TBD	%	TBD	%	TBD
Plateau North Senatorial District (Note: Comprising the local government areas of Barkin Ladi, Bassa, Jos East, Jos North, Jos South, and Riyom.)	TBD	%	TBD	%	TBD	%	TBD	%	TBD	%	TBD
Plateau South Senatorial District (Note: Comprising the local government areas of Langtang North, Langtang South, Mikang, Qua'an Pan, Shendam, and Wase.)	TBD	%	TBD	%	TBD	%	TBD	%	TBD	%	TBD
Totals	TBD	%	TBD	%	TBD	%	TBD	%	TBD	%	TBD

==== By federal constituency ====
The results of the election by federal constituency.

Federal Constituency	Bola Tinubu APC		Atiku Abubakar PDP		Peter Obi LP		Rabiu Kwankwaso NNPP		Others		Total valid votes
Federal Constituency	Votes	%	Votes	%	Votes	%	Votes	%	Votes	%	Total valid votes
Barkin Ladi/Riyom Federal Constituency (Note: Comprising the local government areas of Barkin Ladi and Riyom.)	TBD	%	TBD	%	TBD	%	TBD	%	TBD	%	TBD
Bokkos/Mangu Federal Constituency (Note: Comprising the local government areas of Bokkos and Mangu.)	TBD	%	TBD	%	TBD	%	TBD	%	TBD	%	TBD
Jos North/Bassa Federal Constituency (Note: Comprising the local government areas of Bassa and Jos North.)	TBD	%	TBD	%	TBD	%	TBD	%	TBD	%	TBD
Jos South/Jos East Federal Constituency (Note: Comprising the local government areas of Jos East and Jos South.)	TBD	%	TBD	%	TBD	%	TBD	%	TBD	%	TBD
Kanke/Pankshin/Kanam Federal Constituency (Note: Comprising the local government areas of Kanam, Kanke, and Pankshin.)	TBD	%	TBD	%	TBD	%	TBD	%	TBD	%	TBD
Langtang North/Langtang South Federal Constituency (Note: Comprising the local government areas of Langtang North and Langtang South.)	TBD	%	TBD	%	TBD	%	TBD	%	TBD	%	TBD
Mikang/Qua'an/Pan/Shendam Federal Constituency (Note: Comprising the local government areas of Mikang, Qua'an Pan, and Shendam.)	TBD	%	TBD	%	TBD	%	TBD	%	TBD	%	TBD
Wase Federal Constituency (Note: Comprising the local government areas of Wase.)	TBD	%	TBD	%	TBD	%	TBD	%	TBD	%	TBD
Totals	TBD	%	TBD	%	TBD	%	TBD	%	TBD	%	TBD

==== By local government area ====
The results of the election by local government area.

Local government area	Bola Tinubu APC		Atiku Abubakar PDP		Peter Obi LP		Rabiu Kwankwaso NNPP		Others		Total valid votes	Turnout (%)
Local government area	Votes	%	Votes	%	Votes	%	Votes	%	Votes	%	Total valid votes	Turnout (%)
Barkin Ladi	TBD	%	TBD	%	TBD	%	TBD	%	TBD	%	TBD	%
Bassa	TBD	%	TBD	%	TBD	%	TBD	%	TBD	%	TBD	%
Bokkos	TBD	%	TBD	%	TBD	%	TBD	%	TBD	%	TBD	%
Jos East	TBD	%	TBD	%	TBD	%	TBD	%	TBD	%	TBD	%
Jos North	TBD	%	TBD	%	TBD	%	TBD	%	TBD	%	TBD	%
Jos South	TBD	%	TBD	%	TBD	%	TBD	%	TBD	%	TBD	%
Kanam	TBD	%	TBD	%	TBD	%	TBD	%	TBD	%	TBD	%
Kanke	TBD	%	TBD	%	TBD	%	TBD	%	TBD	%	TBD	%
Langtang North	TBD	%	TBD	%	TBD	%	TBD	%	TBD	%	TBD	%
Langtang South	TBD	%	TBD	%	TBD	%	TBD	%	TBD	%	TBD	%
Mangu	TBD	%	TBD	%	TBD	%	TBD	%	TBD	%	TBD	%
Mikang	TBD	%	TBD	%	TBD	%	TBD	%	TBD	%	TBD	%
Pankshin	TBD	%	TBD	%	TBD	%	TBD	%	TBD	%	TBD	%
Qua'an Pan	TBD	%	TBD	%	TBD	%	TBD	%	TBD	%	TBD	%
Riyom	TBD	%	TBD	%	TBD	%	TBD	%	TBD	%	TBD	%
Shendam	TBD	%	TBD	%	TBD	%	TBD	%	TBD	%	TBD	%
Wase	TBD	%	TBD	%	TBD	%	TBD	%	TBD	%	TBD	%
Totals	TBD	%	TBD	%	TBD	%	TBD	%	TBD	%	TBD	%

== See also ==
- 2023 Plateau State elections
- 2023 Nigerian presidential election
