= List of villages in Plateau State =

Villages in Plateau State

This is a list of villages and settlements in Plateau State, Nigeria, organised within a local government area (LGA) or district (with postal codes also given).

== By postal code ==
LGA	District / Area	Postal code	Villages
Barkin Ladi	Fan	931104	Dafiyona; Ndina Gura; Ndina Rankassa; Nding; Nwok; Rafan; Rite; Tafan
Barkin Ladi	Foron	931105	Fo; Kamang; Kapwen; Kapwis; Ket; Newo; Nofok; Rarung; Rung; Sho; Zabot
Barkin Ladi	Gashish	931102	Exland; Gindan-Akwati; Kakuruk; Kurra-Falls; Kuzen; Ruku; Tenti Baba; Zakerek
Barkin Ladi	Heipang	931103	Ban; Chit; Kpang; Pomol; Tagbam; Tapo; Tatu
Bokkos	Bokkos	932112	Batun; Bokkos; Bot; Butura; Forof; Kop Mandarken; Kuba/Maiyanga; Mangar; Mangor; Mbar; Tangur; Tanti; Tarongol
Bokkos	Daffo	932110	Gada-Biyu; Hottom
Bokkos	Kamwai	932116	Amban; Kangil; Tukyeh
Bokkos	Manguna	932111	Chakfem; Gwashesh; Manguna
Bokkos	Mushere	932113	Horop; Kaban; Kawel; Manger; Mushere
Bokkos	Richa	932109	Barkul; Maboh; Richa
Bokkos	Sha	932114	Mista-Kuku; Mundat
Bokkos	Toff	932115	Ambul; Toff
Jos East	Federe	930110	Damsun; Dorong Babba; Fardo; Febas; Fekolibing; Fredk; Gandi Bappa; Gandi Shom; Jarawa; Keben; Kogi; Lamingel Tsafi; Nabas; Nakwang; Risen/Geri; S. Layi; Yelwa Dorong; Zandi; Zazzi; Zigam
Jos East	Fobur	930106	Adabok; Awari; Faraka; Farin Yashi; Foda Fobur; Fogom; Fulani; Kerker; Kwang 'A; Laminga; Nabatong; Rizak; Sabon Gari; Woda; Zarrazong
Jos East	Fursum	930107	Doss; Fadan Fursum; Foro Jarawa; Fulanin Kabba; Fusan Jarawa; Gingin Karra; Hardo Bello; Hardp Rusa; Hausawan Fusaa; Hausawan Gora; Kwanga; Mai Ido Taro; Maijuju; Nakwon foron; Naton Doss; Niji; Nitseng; Tere; Ungwan Awang
Jos East	Maigemu	930109	Angwara; Ardo Adamu; Ardo Halilu; Danehe; Dankurma; Duze; Fadamdabo; Federe Tudu; Fefur; Feram; Fries; Gurgu; Gwadong; Gwaji; Jail; Kasuwan Dada; Lamingle; Layarda; Mu,un; Nashanana; Nuku; Pa; Rando; Seradang Isafi; Sjibiri; Tudun Baro; Zangam
Jos East	Shere	930108	Chele; Dabo; Dayong; Fefur; Fesumuijng; Fesumuing; Fulani; Gwashe; Lurbi; Sako; Yelwa; Zakin
Jos North	Gwong	930105	Babale; Dong; Fudawa; Furaka; Gwafan; Gwash; Jos Jarawa; Kabong; Larantos; Nabgar; Nabor; Nagohom; Naraguta; Nassarawa A; Nupkis; Rigiza; Rusau; T/Wada; Targwong; Zakaliyo; Zangam; Zangan
Jos South	Du	930101	Anguldi; Bek; Challang; Cham; Chuel; Dadop; Dadura; Dahwol; Dahwol N'tong; Dahwol Vvorok; Dahwol-Dangwong; Dati; Dayah; Diye-Du; Dogo Na-Hauwa; Dorowa Gindin Dutse; Fwapwa; Giring; Got; Hwolshe; Kabong; Kazong; Kufang; Kugiya; Kwang; Kwata; Madu; Mazaram; Rabin Rahol; Rahwol Kanag; Rashonong; Rawarak; Rogatak; Sabwak; Shen; T/Wada; Timtim; Viafyang; Vyara; Wawan; Zawan; Zek; Zok
Jos South	Gyel	930104	Cafeng; Gero; Got; Gura-Lando; Gura-Riyom; Kaxong; Nyango; Rafin Bauna; Ran Gyel; Rankyeng; Ranta; Rasot; S/Gidan Ramar; Tahel; Takum; Tanchol; Yelwa
Jos South	Kuru	930102	Bakuanvwei; Conservation; Dahwul-Wat; Daken; Dancho-Kosho; Danchol; Dankarang; Dawol; Dazek; Gakok (H. Jenta); Gatsen; Hwak; Kanadap; Kazong; Kumbuna; Kuntei; Kushe; Ohol; Police Staff College; Sabon Pegi; School; Shwan; Vwei; Wat; Zankong Soil
Jos South	Vwang	930103	Barikin Turu; Changwi Tawo; Chugwi; Dagai; Daggshet; Danchugwi; Dandyes; Fwil Vwang Kogot; Gott; Hwen; Kaduna Vom; Kogom; Lo Ngeng; Lo-Kun; Rawuk; Tunu Gozok; Tura Chwe; Turu Gweh; Turu Lah
Kanam	Dengi	942101	Bagyar; Bandiri; Bankilong; Basson; Bwalangyip; Dangi Town; Gar-Duam; Gumshir; Guzuk; Gwomgwom; Jahun; Kagyyal; Kass; Kunkyam; Kwalkai; Kyankurum; Mabr; Namaran; Nan-Gar; Yipmong; Yugur
Kanam	Garga	942103	Bayar; Dadda; Garga Mban; Garga-Kufai; Gyangyang-Garga; Kukawa; Kyansar; Kyaram; Munbutbo; Yalwa
Kanam	Kanam	942102	Dal; Dugub; Gagdi; Gidgid; Gilong; Gwarong; Gyangyang; Kam; Mbat; Mun; Mun-Galamkya; Sallaman Kanam; Zakkam
Kanam	Kantana	942104	Bawas; Bribyang; Ganjuwa; Jarmai; Jarmai Hausawa; Jom; Kantana; Takwar; Takzul; Tukur; Tunga; Wakkat-Mulas; Yanla (Wan)
Kanke	Ampang East	933109	Ampang; Dungung; Goktok; Kadang; Kuwang Kaler; Langshi; Lerpye; Leshim Mwel; Munok; Shaktu; Sharam
Kanke	Amper	933110	Amper; Chika; Goltan; Gwamlar; Jewang Jwat; Jimi; Kalin; Lawatang Gugur; Lepgel; Leptar; Lepter Gugur; Nefur Mep; Neran; Pibwir; Rong; Sebri; Shiwer; Tor; Warang; Wekkop Leng; Zangsan
Kanke	Garram	933107	Chiroma; Galadima Tollong; Garram; Goilong Lapiek; Gollong Dangkem; Gollong Forkong; Golong Tollong; Gontingkal; Kangmun; Madaki Dangkem; Madaki Nyayik
Kanke	Kabwir	933108	Bolkon; Dawaki; Gamadaji; Gyangyang; Kabwir; Kudus; Lur; Pada; Rang; Tasha; Teng; Tuwan
Kanke	Pai	933111	Dok; Ewer
Kanke	Tal	933112	Basunsunwang; Chiroma-Kwabzak; Dambi; Galdima-Kwabzak; Killing; Longwap; Madakin Kwabzak; Mungue; Mungyim; Puyam; Tangle
Langtang North	Bwarat	941112	Bangkur; Biller; Chikwak; Dabur; Dangre; Fillap; Kankur; Kensong; Kpadiar; Kumkwam; Kwampe; Laka; Limum; Lohmak; Luwki; Miyam-Shiko; Myam; Nachang; Nyapkai; Pagwam; Pakuk; Pang-myer; Reak; Sabon - Layi; Shiyik; Tippang; Tiuam; Tunkun; Wacha; Zambau-Bwarat; Zambau-Diyan
Langtang North	Gazum	941102	Ang. Chiroma; Ang. Galadima; Dabgyil; Danbur; Dibbar; Fujul; Funyallany; Gabong; Gantang; Igbar; Jwakber; Kukwar; Kullok; Kumkaka; Kumkwar; Kwallak; Langan; Langbap; Pang; Panmyam; Wallyat; Waroh; Warrang; Zambaraki
Langtang North	Langtang (Rural)	941101	Ang. Pada; Bali; Bankun; Bapkwai; Batkilang; Danga; Danglong; Dingjor; Durgu; Gazaam; Gian - Gazadima; Gwandamung; Ibim; Jidadi; Kalapi; Kandim; Kangtang; Kongnkog; Kuffen; Kukwar; Kuyim; Lazhan; Lifir; Lipchok; Lop; Mabe; Mankot; Mantamtam; Mban; Mindim; Nassarawa; Ndinzhan; Ngura; Ngwak; Nowar; Nwur; Ntorok; Nyattang; Nyer; Nyer - Jarak; Nyer - Ponzhi; Padur; Pajat; Pangna; Pock; Pyar; Pyache; Pyayil; Rimi; Sabon - Layi; Shiber; Shifor; Shikal; Shishiri; Tabat; Tahfa; Talbul; Tarok; Tongtong; Wallang; Yal; Zambur; Zamchan; Zamko; Zamkumkum; Zanzat; Zhantani
Langtang North	Pil	941103	Angwan - gani; Angwan Marafa; Angwan Yari; Binding; Dangyil; Ganjglang; Gindim; Gunnunu; Kaplak; Kurgwan; Kynjit; Laka; Lawur; Mai Bangyel; Pil; Pishe; Yakot; Zamadede; Zamgwar
Langtang South	Dadin Kowa	941107	Lamdwal; Walnim; Wubang; Zambang
Langtang South	Fajul	941111	Faya; Nakiwasw
Langtang South	Gamakai	941110	Dinshan; Takakafia; Timman
Langtang South	Lashel	941104	Kamkum; Taigwang; Timfam
Langtang South	Resettlement Area	941109	Dandinkowa; Dorawa; Fajul; Faya; Gamakai; Gamin; Gbaldung; Gida Bua; Kamkun; Karkashi; Mabudi; Magama Mangwam; Maiyanga; Milfoar; Nassarawa; Ndushim; Soban Gida nagani; Takalafiya; Taldun; Talgwang; Timbol; Timshak; Turaki; Zamya
Langtang South	Sabon Gida	941106	Gamin; Koko; Kwaikon; Mailfour
Langtang South	Timbol	941105	Barracks; Bolya; Karkashi; Long-Goemai; Magama; Nassawa; Timshat
Langtang South	Turaki	941108	Daruwa; Kanana; Mahanga; Nassarawa
Mangu	Gindiri	932103	Chanso; Cinbun; Janaret; Kasuwan Ali
Mangu	Jipal	932108	Kaper; Katual; Kundun; Zuwahai
Mangu	Kerang	932107	Ampang; Sabon Kerang
Mangu	Kumbul	932105	Bwai; Dari; Kumbul
Mangu	Langai	932102	Babban Rinji; Kadunun; Langai
Mangu	Mangu	932101	Bunga; Chakfem; Jipal; Kantoma; Mairana; Mangu; Mangu Halle; Sabon Gari
Mangu	Panyam	932104	Daika; Kombili; Kopal; Nyes, Panyam
Mangu	Vodni	932106	Bwonpe; Garkun; Kambring; Kopshir; Puka; Pushit; Telengpat; Vodni
Mikang	Garkawa	940108	Gingim; Jimakwi; Killa; Kongnati; Lahil; Longgkrom; Poensong; Rotha; Swoshal; Tundun Wada; Yakoep
Mikang	Koeneom	940105	Lifidi; Lun-Niyu (Lifin); Nwoop; Pangshot; Pangsot; Zomo
Mikang	Montol	940107	Baltep; Betkang; Dinmuanpus; Laham; Lalin; Pockot; Pocyuum; Swakan; Talme; Tunkus
Mikang	Paipung	940106	Gotlong; Koetes; Longbis; Pangjiem; Piaber; Piapung; Poekot; Tangguk; Zamkoekop
Pankshin	Chip	933103	Angwan-Hausawa; Bakwar; Bongmut; Chip; Daboshu; Dimwai; Dungwu; Jepmidiyel; Jepmijit; Jikon; Kangmum; Karam; Khipil; Kwalah; Longkamt; Mingkohot; Minting; Mudung; Pabower; Pikongship; Tanglant
Pankshin	Fier	933105	Gwabi Nyelleng; Kadyis; Mier; Mile; Mudel; Nyelleng; Takkas
Pankshin	Kadung	933106	Chiroma; Chrus; Galadima; Jivir; Kadung; Pada; Panzam; Saikn-Gurrup; Sarkin Burum
Pankshin	Lankan	933104	Akong; Amnat; Adeng; Asa;Chinkat; Changgash; Dyis/Abwor; Genye; Ghibang, Gutong; Ghuza Jiblik; Jak; Jing; Kagu; Kap; Labyom; Lander; Lankan; Lungchan; Mosan; Ninkut; Nungwus, Parkat; Permangous; Sihin; Tangfom; Tinkum; Zundun
Pankshin	Pankshin (Rural)	933101	Ballang Lep; Ballang-Shippang; Barche; Beinin; Berek; Bumning; Bwarak; Chigwong; Chikan; Ciroma-Shippang; Dene; Dereng; Duk; Dungyle; Galadima Lep; Gromamep; Gun; Hikumuran; Jang; Kanyi; Kapang; Katke (Tanglat); Kazuk; Kobi; Kop; Koploki; Kor; Kudol; Kulukning; Kuwang-Fung; Labwor; Lagor; Landan; Lishan; Ma Aji Vel; Magyil; Manget; Miller; Ngolong; Pangpel; Pankshin; Pankshin (Ner); Shippang; Sum; Tambes; Taying; Tubong; Tukung; Tulwar; Wulmi; Wuseli
Pankshin	Wokkos	933102	Buttal; Dakup; Dang; Dikkal; Fwenzuk; Gille; Iskep; Jimat; Kwalla; Lepbwai; Mantom; Tazuk
Qua'an Pan	Bwall	940112	Bwal Goechim; Bwal Goepil; Bwal Nakum
Qua'an Pan	Doemak	940109	Bong; Dang toe geom.; Dimmuk; Geobout; Geochim; Kangwe; Kangyl; Katoon; Latok
Qua'an Pan	Dokan Kasuwa	940114	Dungnocgoch; Komkwas; Kopgoewam; Kwanoeng; Lagurut; Yilpia
Qua'an Pan	Kwal (Koffar)	940113	Boglong; Koffiar; Kongde; Lardang; Lumuat; Miket
Qua'an Pan	Kwalla	940111	Chim; Goeba'an; Goepin; Kofogom; Kopboetpang; Kopwarmak; Kwaggar; Muda; Shangful'up; Yadin; Yitlas'ar
Qua'an Pan	Kwande	940115	Ampap; Bakin Ciyawa; Giddan Dabat; Kurgwi; Kwande; Turniang
Qua'an Pan	Kwang	940110	Fujing; Kwang; Kwang Dala; La'ar
Qua'an Pan	Namu	940116	Janta; Kayarda; Kwari; Lankaku; Namu; Njak; Pandam; Shindai
Riyom	Jal	931108	Bum; Danto; Dantse; Danwal; Fangroi; Gura; Koroda; Kwakhwi
Riyom	Riyom	931107	Gol; Jol; Kwi; Ra-Hoss; Rim; Ta-Hoss
Shendam	Dakan Tofa	940107	Katai; Kirgagan; Met; Nanes; Ngaj; Tak Doka; Tengnadung
Shendam	Derpeng	940103	Bunoegwang; Dualak; Duankwan; Dung-Goeshing; Gaklang; Hambiaka; Jayu; Kendeng; Lurka; Nyak; Tsa kani; Tunwanghem
Shendam	Dorok	940104	Biembiem; Demshim; Goesm; Gonvel; Haambangkalong; Kuka; Makera; Moekat; Namass; Nda-yak; Ngwazam; Pape; Shimankar; Ungwan Dadi; Ungwan Rina
Shendam	Shendam	940101	Ajikamai; Bakin Kogi; Derlit; Dungba; Garas; Gidan-Adamu; Ilalong; Kato; Kuru wat; Kuruh Lagai; Kwaphur; Kwapkuwa; Lakushi; Lavaba; Lon goebou; Longvel; Naburuk; Nball; Nbet; Nder; Nshar; Ntuer; Pangshom; Peoshie; Poediel; Rajiyam Giwa; Shanlang; Shendam; Shepwan; Shunkwan; Sohlut; Soklut; Tangzeb; Tinhan; Tsovo; Tukum; Tumbi; Turdung Doruwa; Yamini; Yelwa
Wase	Bashar	942108	Bashar; Gaji Bashar; Gingir; Gudu; Kanpani; Madaci; Nyalun; Sabon-Layi; Safiyo; Yuli; Zurak
Wase	Kadarko	942107	Bakin-Rijiya; Danshanya; Dogon-Ruwa; Garga; Gimbi; Glakwai; Gwuman-Kogi; Jauri; Jigawan-Audu; Kadarko; Kumboug; Mavo; Pinou; Ruwan Goggo; Team; Tsamiya
Wase	Lamba	942106	Anguwan-Clar; Damau; Gumshar; Kuka; Lamba; Nakibulala; Nassarawa; Pako; Salawai; Talafiya; Wase Tofa
Wase	Wase Town	942105	Ang. Garkuwa; Ang. Kuyambana; Ang. Makaki; Ang. Sayawa; Angwan; Rugan Jodi; Zamburun

== By electoral ward ==
Below is a list of polling units, including villages and schools, organised by electoral ward.

LGA	Ward	Polling Unit Name
Barikin Ladi	Barakin Ladi	Katako; St. Marks Prim. Sch. I; Gangare; Gangare Tasha I; Kampani I; Kampani II; Takwok/Kwok; Angwan Sarki; Sabon Layi I; Sabon Layi II; Kafi Abu; Kashangwol; St. Marks Prim. Sch. II; Gangare Tasha II; Kampani II1
Barikin Ladi	Gassa/Sho	Gassa Ekan School; Jal Village; Sho Village; Bel Village; Rehoot; Raring; Rakung Village; Rahwol Village; Nding Gassa; Lea Prim. School
Barikin Ladi	Gindin Akwati	Rantis Village; Ruku Village; Tanti Baba I; Tanti Baba II; Maiyanga Town; Kyarang Village; Exlands L. S. B; Exlands I; Nga’Ar Village; Yelwa Gindi; Exlands II
Barikin Ladi	Heipang	Fwomol Prim. School; Ban Village; Dan Mangu; Tokang I; Tagbam I; Tagbam II; Kobang; Chit Village; Tatu Village; Tokang II
Barikin Ladi	Kapwis	Kapwen Village; Zaron Village I; Zaron Village II; Bak Village; Zakupang; Dorong; Rebet; Bakin Kogi Prim. School I; Ket Village; Patiko Village I; Vat Njong; Kakpwis Loh; Pandadi I; Bakin Kogi Prim. School II; Patiko Village II; Pandadi II
Barikin Ladi	Kurra Falls	St. Matthews Kurra Falls; St. Patrick's Kurra Falls; Zakarek Village; Kaching Village; Kakuruk Village; Gashishkuk/Makoli; Gyo Dogo Village; Kwabiduk; Kuzen Prim. Schol; Gashish Kuk/Makoli; Kura Birom Village
Barikin Ladi	Lobiring	Lobiring Village; Gafat Village; Wereh Village; Dorowa Babuje I; Rapwomol; Jok Village; Lohala; Bwom; Bet Village; Dorowa Babuje II; Dorowa Babuje III
Barikin Ladi	Marit/Mazat	Ganandaji Town; Mazat; Gana Ropp Town I; Marit Town I; Marit Town II; Tudun Mazat Village; Manjohota Town; Buka Bakwai Town; Gana Ropp Town II; Marit Town III
Barikin Ladi	Rafan	Rite Razek; Rafan Raku Rabwak; Rawuru Prim. School; Nding Susut; Rashwei; Nafan Dredge / Hyelong; Barakin Joji; Kangasho Village; Nding Pri. Sch; Nyarwa
Barikin Ladi	Tafan	Dorowa Tsoho; Bawan Dodo; Shallum Rabwak; Nfabon I; Bedurum; Batabasir I; Batabasir II; Jankop Nziring; Gara Kugot; Shamashok/Tusung; Tapwang Fan Loh
Barikin Ladi	Zabot	Zabot Village; Newo Village; Foron Ekan; Kamang Village; Zargun Village; Rung Ratsat; Sabon Gidan Foron; Mai Idon Taro I; Mai Idon Taro II; Roh Rarung; Bisichi Town; Ude; Rat Village; Bwara Foh; Dalo Memorial; Bisichi Town II
Bokkos	Bokkos	Shukur I; Takai I; Ung. Hausawa; Pry. School, Bot; Prim. School, Mandarke; Prim. School, Matol; Prim. School, Ruwi; Ung. Sarki I; Dakanung; Shukur II; Takai II; Ung. Sarki II
Bokkos	Butura	Prim. School. Butura Gida; Prim. School Maiyanga; Prim. Sch. Maikatako; Prim. School, Kunet; Primary School., Vet; Prim. School, Butura Kampani; Saf Kuba; Ung. Kwano; But; Ngashi; Mabel
Bokkos	Daffo	Prim. School, Daffo; Prim. School, Ganda; Dispensary Goro; Prim. School, Maiduna; Prim. School, Josho; Old Town; Prim. School, Hottom; Sabon Barki
Bokkos	Kamwai	Prim. School, Kamwai; Prim. School, Amban; Prim. School, Dimak (Wanze); Kamwal; Kangil; Pry Sch Tukey(Wanze)
Bokkos	Kwatas	Saf Forof; Marish; Prim. School, Kwatas; Prim. School, Mbwele; Prim. School, Sabon Barki; Prim. School, Wumat; Tarangol; Gamajigo; Sabon Barki; Chenget
Bokkos	Mangor	Prim. School, Gawarza; Ung. Sarki; Ramtisho; Cirang; Prim. School, Mangor
Bokkos	Mbar/Mangar	Prim. School, Magi; Prim. School, Mbar; Prim. School, Yalwa Nono; Prim. School, Gada Biyu; Pry Sch Mangar I; Pry Sch Mangar II; Kundar; Prim. School, Horom; Mokotong
Bokkos	Manguna	Prim. School, Manguna; Taddai; Prim. School, Hurti; Prim. School, Karfa; Dishau; Pry Sch Gwande I; Pry Sch Gwande II; Mahurumbade; Mahurum; Taggai
Bokkos	Mushere Central	Pry Sch Mushere I; Pri. School, Kawel; Kopdil; Rom; Kanger; Hokk; Garah; Sat; Suwa; Pry Sch Mushere II; Prim. School, Kawel
Bokkos	Mushere West	Prim. School, Horop; Prim. School, Kopmur; Mbor I; Mbor II; Prim. Schol, Kaban; Kadim Kassa; Primary School, Margif; Nvala Kadim
Bokkos	Richa	Prim. School, Richa; Prim. School, Digot; Primary School, Maiduna; Prim. School, Barkul; Prim. School, Maboh; Marin Richa; Prim. School, Richa
Bokkos	Sha	Prim. School, Sha; Pry. School, Mundat; Wullam; Mastakuku; Pry. School, Sha
Bokkos	Tangur	Pry. School, Tangur; Pry. School, Manduk; Pry Sch Pyakmalu I; Pry Sch Pyakmalu II; Pry. School, Mushu; Ndun; Mper; Pry. School, Mandung
Bokkos	Toff	Toff Tabui; Pry. School, Kwarka; Pry. School, Passakai; Tamoso I; Tamoso II; Pry. School, Ambul; Siken; Kunduk
Jos East	Federe	Federe/Clinic; Federe / Market; Keben; Febas/D/Kurmi; Nabar; Kudedu
Jos East	Fobur 'A'	Fadan Fobur; Fobur Ekan; Fadan Dabo; Hardo Adamu; Boda; New Fobur/Primary Sc Hool; New Fobur/P. H. C; Furaka; Farin Yashi; Wada Farin Yashi; Afozi; Kunyitser; Fegom; Nukes
Jos East	Fobur 'B'	Kwanga; Zarazon; Laminga; Sabon Gari; Rizek/Pry. School; Rizek Phc; Nabatong; Kerker; Kuron; Iwarze; Kanu Ribakok; Zott Sabo
Jos East	Fursum	Naton Fusa; Fusa Jarawa; Fadan Fursum; Gora; Mai Idon Taro; Fewit
Jos East	Jarawan Kogi	Gurgu Village; Angware (Phc); Saradang; Lamingel; Nuku/Fadan Dabo; Zangam; Nashaning; Tudun Boro; Lange-Lange
Jos East	Mai Gemu	Gada Village; Gada Prim. School; Duguza; Maigemu; Godong; Danche; Kayarda; Gwashina
Jos East	Maijuju	Nitseng; Tere; Niji; Doss; Maijuju; Filibot; Ang Rogo (Nitsaap)
Jos East	Shere East	Zakim; Fezumung; Dayong; Shere Isha; Fulani; Shere Dabo; Rabin Shere; Kashidung
Jos East	Shere West	Durbi; Gwisti; Gwash; Fefor; Yelwa; Sako; Zuben/Durbi
Jos East	Zandi	Zandi; Damshun; Zigam I; Zigam II; Gora Sabon Layi; Rise Zazi; Nakwang I; Nakwang II; Gandi; Dorong; Yelwa; Nabar; Nakwang Ung Sarki
Jos North	Abba Na Shehu	Bauchi Road I; Bauchi Road II; Yan Doka Turaki I; Yan Doka Turaki II; Lawan Na Rogo; School Lane I; School Lane II; Audun Kenken I; Mamman Borno I; Mamman Borno II; Abba Na Shehu I; Abba Na Shehu II; Abba Na Shehu III; Kofar Sarkin Kubi; Garba Jibiya; Idi Mai Borkono; Mass Jumma'A Street; Audu Lane; Turaki Lane; Mango Street; Yan Reke; Inuwa Kano; Bakano Lane; School Lane III; Mamman Borno III; Massalaci Jumma’A Str. I; Audu Kenken II; Bauchi Road III; Massalaci Jumma’A Str. II
Jos North	Ali Kazaure	Abdulsalami St. I; New Market; Kofar Mai Ungwa I; Kofar Mai Ungwa II; Alh. Umar Lane I; Alh. Umar Lane II; Sarki Mangu Street; Lambert Street; Ung. Dalyop Junction I; Idi Mai Borkono; Emenike Street; Ung. Dalyop Junction II; Haruna Hadeja; Lasisi Makanjuola; Amingo Junction I; Kofar Mai Ungwa III; Monedo Street; Ali Kazaure; Lged School; Mallam Kure St.; Asibitin Kutare; Moses Anyansi St.; New Market I; Community Centre; Haliru Street; Abdulsalami St. II; Ishaku Gwamna St.; Kofar Yahai Maitaya; Fed. Hotel Junction; Relevant Tech; Nurudeen Township Sch.; Mudi Na Garba; Yan Kaji; Ali Kazaure St.; Osumenyi Street; New Market II; Amingo Junction II
Jos North	Garba Daho	Sarki Street; Galadima Street; Alh. Fadi Street I; Cole Street; Pump Street; Bauchi Road; Ndu Street; Kasuwa Dare I; Kasuwa Dare II; Ayeni Street I; Ayeni Street II; Butcher Lane; Sani Street; Yan Taya; Yan Tinka; Mega Street; Yan Doya; Kasuwa Dare Junction; Yan Taya Junction; Galadima St. Junction; Dilimi Street (Behind Cardinal Road); Alh. Fadi Street II; Cole Street Junction; Massalaci Dilimi Street; Yan Katifa Dilimi
Jos North	Gangare	Gss Gangare I; Gss Gangare; Kofar Mai Saje I; Kofar Mai Saje II; Parentin Itache; K/Alh. Gambo; Yan Kashi I; Yan Kashi II; K/Mal. Musa; Richard Way; Post Office; Railway Station; Murtala Way; Kofar Magaji; Dakin Mitin; K/Sarkin Dogarai; Kofar Shehu; Kofar Yaya; Kofar Katagum; Gss Gangare II
Jos North	Ibrahim Katsina	Adebayo Street; Kolo Street; Bauchi Road I; Drovers Lane; Behind Dilimi; Ndu Street; Cole Street; Sarki Street I; Sarki Street II; Buzu Street I; Buzu Street II; Bauchi Road II; Dan Maraya; Sabuwar Unguwa I; Butcher Lane; Dilimi; Labour Office; Lungun Makafi; Farin Wata; Zololo Junction; Dogon Agogo; Bauchi Road III; Labour Office Junction; Sabuwar Ungwa II
Jos North	Jenta Adamu	Plateau Hospital Junction; Hill Station Junction I; Ung. Markeri Junction; Presidonia J/Adamu I; Nta Qtrs J/Adamu I; Polo Ground; Jenta Kassa; St. Lukes Pry. School I; Warders Club I; Hausa Road; Plateau Hospital I; Noad Road; Old Bukuru Road; Jenta Mangoro; Ung. Jenta Makeri; Riyom Drive; Jenta Tudun J/Adamu; Plateau Hotel Junction; Presidonia J/Adamu II; St. Lukes Pry. School II; Warders Club II; Plateau Hospital II; Hill Station Junction II; Nta Quarters J/Adamu II
Jos North	Jenta Apata	Apata I; Apata II; Unity Junction I; Unity Junction II; Maichibi Street; Afodume Street; Ojukwu Street; Okporido Street; Lambu Valley I; Lambu Valley II; Laranto Loop; Rafin Pa I; Sda Pry. School; Laranto Market I; Laranto Market II; Gss Laranto; Katako Bridge; Rafin Pa II; Apata III; Jenta Miango; Busa Buji Street I; Danja Street; Adetutu Street; Zakariya Dimkat Street; Base Supreme Junction; Tempest Pry. School; Yan Timba Lane I; People's Hotel Junction; Salama Private School; Apata IV; Busa Buji Street II; S. D. A Primary School; Yan Timber Lane II
Jos North	Jos Jarawa	Itsitsa; Ung. Kazeazi; Jos Jarawa; Ung. Chiroma; Ung. Manu Azi I; Ung. Manu Azi II; Lged Rikkos; Baptist Layout; Ung. Azi Itse; Liberty Layout; Dutse Uku; Kwanga 'B'; Baptist Gwafan; Nupis; Furaka Village; Ung. Wakili I; Ung. Wakili II; Katon Rikkos; Dncr; Ung. Kaze; Ung. Nyam Baka; Rigung Gwash; Yan Trailer; Another Life Village; Ung. Uban Doma; Lamingo Junction; Lea Lamingo; Ung. Agidi Rikkos; Rikkos Centre; Phc Gwafan I; Phc Gwafan II; Gwash Village; Baptist Pry. School; Ung. Wakili III; Rokkos Centre
Jos North	Naraguta 'A'	Gadan Bako; Kasuwan Dare I; Kasuwan Dare II; Gadan Sogai I; Gadan Sogai II; Gadan Alasarin; Yan Alibo; Ung. U. N. A I; Yamset Clinic; Yan Shanu I; Yan Shanu II; Ung. Azi (Filin Ball); Ung. Madaki I; Ung. Madaki II; Yan Shanu III; Yan Shanu IV; Yan Alibo I; Ung. Madaki III; Baptist Pry. School; Ung. U. N. A II; Ung. U. N. A III; U. N. An Area I; U. N. An Area II; Nepa Junction; Premier Hotel Junction I; Yan Alibo II; Filin Ball; Congo Junction; Ung. Azi; Premier Hotel Junction II
Jos North	Naraguta 'B'	Konan Soja; Gtc Jos; Ubyel I; Ubyel II; Ung. Rimi I; Ung. Rimi II; Ung. Rimi III; Kunga I; Mazah Tarshi; Gwong; Behwol Pry. School; Mazah Liba; Mazah Nagohom; F. R. C. Zaria Road; Ung. Rogo Pry. Schol; Behin Unijos I; Behin Unijos II; Mallam Chai; Gadan Bauchi I; Unijos. Pry. School I; Ung. Rogo Pry. School I; Ung. Rogo Pry. School II; Ung. Ujah I; Ung. Ujah II; Da Dusu Square; Mishkaham Office; Da Kalma Square; Ung. Da Mamman Dang; Chweln Yap I; Ung. Da Adamu Zang; Univ. Pry. School II; Univ. Pry. School III; Govt. Staff Quarters; Student Village; Sabon Layi; Naraguta Hostel; G. S. S. Jos; Gidan Sarki Fudawa; Fudawa; Nabor Fudawa; Legislator's Quarters; Dogon Dutse; Mac. Williams Junction; Al-Imam Pry. School; Ung. Rogo Pry. School III; G. S. S. Babale I; Targwong; Rafin Jaki; Rigiza Lea I; Rigiza Lea II; Zololo Village; Zangam; Yelwa; Ungwa. Keke; Ung. Rukuba I; Ung. Rukuba II; Ung. Rukuba III; Area Court; Rusai Village; P. H. C Ung. Rogo; Tajir; Rusai Village I; Mazah Yaham; Rusai Village II; Marah Ginzi; Legislator's Quarters Junction; Asibitin Dauda A/Rogo I; Asibitin Dauda A/Rogo II; Mall. Chai Street; Ung. Rimi IV; Senior Staff Quarters; Rizah; Ukadum Kunga; Ayuma Upana; Mazah Ugitin; Yaruje; Hwol Tithalan; Water Works; Rhikum Village; Mazah Junction; Rishari Rhakubu; Ecwa Seminary; Konan Mumbut; Chweln Yap Lgedi; Chweln Yap Lgedi II; Yan Trailer; Great Commission; Ubyal Goroh; Ung. Mallam. Chai; Ung. Ujah; Markus Ishaya Loop; Sani Santi Bread A/Rogo; Duala Hotel Junction; Kofar Musa Santana A/Rogo; A. A. Adam Ung. Rogo; Kofar Mal. Musa U/Rogo; Nepa Village Zaria Road; Snr. Staff Quarters; Gadan Bauchi II; Ung. Rogo Pry. School IV; Ung. Rukuba IV
Jos North	Sarkin Arab	Mohammed Wada Street; Afodume Street; New Market; Yusuf Street; Haliru Street; Atili Street; Moonshine H. Junction; Sarkin Arab Street; Potatoes Market; Dodo Street I; Dodo Street II; William Street; Mallam Audu Street; Cemetery Street; Ajayi Street; Enugu Street; Old Railway
Jos North	Tafawa Balewa	Kashim Ibrahim; Pankshin Street; Gombe Avenue; Zik Avenue I; Tafawa Balewa; Township School; Eyamba Street; Ndagi Farouk; Niger Avenue; Prestige Hotel Junction; Zik Avenue II
Jos North	Tudun Wada - Kabong	Kabong South; Alheri Central; Alheri South I; Alheri South II; Utan Central; St. Murumba Zaria Rd I; Ung. Abuja T/Wada I; Ung. Lagos T/Wada I; Ung. Lagos T/Wada II; Ung. Gada T/Wada; Ung. Miango T/Wada I; Ung. Miango T/Wada II; Ung. Bauda T/Wada I; Ung. Bauda T/Wada II; Ung. Bauda T/Wada III; St. Murumba Zaria Rd II; Ung. Wali Gada Biyu I; Ung. Wali Gada Biyu II; Ung. Soya I; Ung. Soya II; Lea Pr. Sch. T/Wada; Fed. Secretariat I; Ung. Hausawa T/Wada I; Apolo Crescent; Ung. Yashi T/Wada I; Ung. Yashi T/Wada II; Ung. Abuja T/Wada II; Ung. Abuja T/Wada III; Dong Village; Ung. Chiroma Rukuba Rd; Wild Life Park; Kabong Central I; Kabong Central II; Kabong Rcm; Utan North; Utan South; Ung. Sarki T/Wada; Sabon Gari Mado Tudunwada; Mado Tourism Gate T/Wada; Albarkans Pri. Pry. Sch. T/Wada; Area Court T/Wada; Bright Way Rukuba Road; Ung. Rimi Rukuba Road; Ung. Chai Kabong; Bauda Kabong; Alama Junction Rukuba Rd; Ung. Chawai Kabong; Utan Phc; Ung. Sale Lane U/Soya; Ung. Mata Kabong; Ung. Juma’A Road; Rock Haven Zaria Rd; J. M. D. B Quarters, T/Wada; Post Office, Zaria Road; Mallam Fari Junction, Zaria Rd; Gboko Road, T/Wada; Dong Village (Ung. Chiroma); Nepa Close T/Wada; Ung. Kowa Rukuba Road; Behind St. Murumba Z/Road; Utan Lane Rukuba Rd I; Ung. Lagos T/Wada III; Fed. Secretariat II; Ung. Hausawa T/Wada II; Utan Lane Rukuba Rd II
Jos North	Vanderpuye	Panyam Street I; Church Street; Shendam Street I; St. Pauls Township; Yelwa Street; Panyam Street II; Rwang Pam Street; Langtang Street; St. Theresa Boys School; Doherty Street; Shendam Street II
Jos South	Bukuru	Baptist Primary School; Yelwa; Steel Rolling Mill Quarters; Corona; Islamiya I; St. Jarlarths Pry. School I; Nesco; Kugiya I; Motor Park; Mall. Idi Street; Bwandang; Zang Sec. School; Kajola Street I; New Layout; Mugambus; Kerana Lea School I; Kirana Village; Sabon Layi; Gero Road; Behind Diamond Bank; St. Peters Pry. School I; Guralando; Wolbi; Bah; C. T. M. Stadium; Post Office I; Alkali Street I; Farida; Zango Street; Ogbomosho Street; Madaki Street; Warram Street; Dr. Isiri Street; Audu Street; Opposite Potato Market; S. I. M Street; Post Office II; Amale Street; Yandoka Street; Baptist Street.; Jos Road Co-Perative Office; Islamiya II; St. Jarlarths Pry. School II; Kajola Street II; Kerana Lea Pry School, II; St. Peters Pry. School, II; Alkali Street II; Kugiya II
Jos South	Du	Du Ekan Pry. School; Ladura I; Kagayan; Ropang; Latyi-Du I; Old Govt. House I; St. Georges Pry. School I; Latya; Doi; Fwavwai; Kwang I; Rahwol Kanang I; T. C. N. N; Fwaty; Dura; Lohwol-Chom; Ladura II; Old Government House II; St. Georges Pry. School II; Dilimi/Kwang II; Rahwol Kanang II; Latyi-Du II; Old Govt. House II1; Du Ekan Pry. School II
Jos South	Giring	Staff Training Centre I; Staff Training Centre II; National Directorate Of Employment; Coomex; Hwolshe Pry. School I; Kirana; Gigiring; Hwolshe/Giring; Mountain View; Danyere; Abbattoir Road Rcm I; Cormrin Road; Fototek I; Abbattoir Market; Rigip; Ji-Giring; Airforce Pry. School; Namua; Yingi; Dahwol; State Secretariat; Danchom; Gold & Base; Shaka; Dogon Karfe I; Video Mars; Hill Crest; Jeka Kadima I; Hwolshe Pry. School, II; Abbattoir Road I; Fototek II; Dogon Karfe II; Jeka Kadima II; Hwolshe Clinic; Abbattoir Magistrate Court; Dogon Karfe II1
Jos South	Gyel 'A'	Sabon G/Kanar; Gura Riyom; Lea Sabon G/Kanar; Sot Gyel; Rasot Gyel I; Gafang; Yamma; Ganye I; Rankyeng I; Lea Gyel; Loh Dabaran; Gangare; Gangare II; Tanchol; Dabwan; Tahei; Takum; Gero; Lwelen; Gazon; Rasot Gyel II; Ganye II; Rankyeng II; Ganye II1
Jos South	Gyel 'B'	Sabon Barki; Chwel; Vwo; Nyango; State Lowcost I; State Low Cost II; Rakun Beleng; Bukuru Lowcost I; Bukuru Lowcost II; Barkin Acha I; Rafin Bauna; Building Material Market; State Lowcost II1; Bukuru Lowcost II1; Barkin Acha II
Jos South	Kuru 'A'	Dakan; Chol; Dahwol; Kanadap I; Dabwak; Dazek; Vwei; Kuru Jantar II1; Shwan; Kunte; Kavitex; Danchol; Kanadap II; G. S. S. Kuru
Jos South	Kuru 'B'	Sabon Pegi I; Gtc Bukuru; Kumbuna; Dakyen; Police Staff College; Guchon; Wat; Maternity I; Maternity II; Nipss; Fed. Soil Conservation School; Dahwak; Sabon Pegi II; Sabon Pegi II1; Dahwak II; Dahwak II1; Gss Hwak
Jos South	Shen	Kazong Shen I; Ji-Shen; Rapwarak; San; Fwapwa; Doi; Tim-Tim; Kazong Shen II; Dogo Na Hauwa; Zot Shen
Jos South	Turu	Turu I; Lah; Bwandang I; Dakun Pyam; Turu Loh; Dakunji; Gazok; Danyuruk I; Danye II; Rouchungun I; Farin Lamba; Kuru Babba; Turu Hahak Rahei; Dahwol-Bot; Ropyal; Domp; N. V. Ri K/Vom; Turu II; Danyuruk II; Rouchungun II; Rouchungun II1; N. V. Ri K/Vom II; Bwandang II
Jos South	Vwang	Lokun I; Dangashet; Dalloh; Loniyeng I; Chuni; Sot; Rawuk; Kogom Rak; Kogom Tak; Fwil; Darangi I; Chaha; Hwon; Heita; Dandyes; Dalyoho; Choll; Daros; Dabwang; Vwang Kogot; Kwit; Chakarum; Lokun II; Loniyeng II; Darangi II
Jos South	Zawan 'A'	Anguldi; Lodung; Benjii; Zek; Govt. College, Zawan; Dorowa; School Of Health Zawan; Zawan; Kwata; Dadiyeng; Rogotak; Darana; Sabon Layi I; Govt. College, Zawan II; Sabon Layi II
Jos South	Zawan 'B'	R. C. M Dadin Kowa; Dadin Kowa; Dadin Kowa Market II; F. D. A Road I; F. D. A Road II; Dashik I; Chindi; Fed. Low Cost I; Anglo- Jos; Dashonong; Kambel; New Life; Channel 7; Kufang I; Kufang Road I; Zarmaganda; Diye-Diye; Barkin Akawu; Barkin Akawu Road; Mazaram; Bida-Bidi; Unity Lane I; Rcm Dadin Kowa II; Dashik II; Fed. Low Cost II; Kufang II; Kufang Road II; Kufang Road II1; Dadin Kowa Market II; Unity Lane II
Kanam	Birbyang	Birbyang Pry. School; Tunga Primary School; Ganjuwa Pry. School; Paplan Gyangas
Kanam	Dengi	Gss Dengi; Central Pry. School; Ung. Marafa Pry. School; Kasuwa I; Kasuwa II; Ung. Goje Pry. School I; Ung. Goje Pry. School II; Motor Park; Near Emir's Palace; Donkai; Bagyar Pry. School; Bagyar; Maimun-Runji Pry. School; Ung. Sarki Gar; Gar Pry. School; Duwam; Gar Pada; Pishei; Central Pry. School, Dengi
Kanam	Dugub	Dugub Pry. School I; Munkal Pry. School; Wawus Dutse; Mbas Pry. School; Yam Pry School; Mundu; Dugub Pry. School II; Wallang
Kanam	Gagdi	Gadgid Pry. School; Gyorang; Takbin; Nasarawa Pry. School; Mbat Ung. Hakimi Pry. Schol; Kam Ung. Hakimi Pry. School; Ung. Hakimi Pry. School; Gidgid Pry . School; Takyili Pry. School I; Takyili Pry. School II; Gyangian \A\" Pry. School"""; Mbat Dapshi Pry. School; Bungudu Pry. School; Kunwur Pry. Schol; Zak'Am Pada; Gwarlak; Gyangyang `A` Pry. Sch
Kanam	Garga	Garga Central Pry. School; G. S. S Garga I; Lugur Pry. School; Gyangyang Garga Pry. School; G. S. S Garga II; Kukawa Pry. School; Tattumi Kyaram; Gyambau; Yelwa; Gss Garga
Kanam	Gumsher	Gumsher Pry. School; Fiel; Kinpigom/Vondot; Mabar; Yugur; Bankilong Pry. Sch. I; Bankilong Pry. Sch. II; Nyongnyong; Gomgom; Wum
Kanam	Gwamlar	Gwamlar I; Gwamlar II; Yamini Pry. School; Bannak U/Sarkin Yaki; Tunkushi; Guzuk; Gyambar; Kakyam; Basson A; Basson B; Zungum
Kanam	Jarmai	Jarmai Central Pry. School; Jarmai Pry. School; Ung. Hausawa Pry. School; Guruntung; Mulas Sabon Gida I; Mulas Sabon Gida II
Kanam	Jom	Jom Pry. School; Gangar; Ung. Sarkin Yamma; S'Abon Layi
Kanam	Kanam	Kwalmiya Pry. Sch. I; Kwalmiya Pry. Sch. II; Mashiyaw Dinya Pry. Sch. I; Tudun Wada; Gilong; Takyirok Pry. School; Kunsha'Am Pry. School; Galamkya Pry. Sch. I; Galamkya Pry. Sch. II; Pidum Pry. School I; Pidum Pry.. School II; Mashiyaw Dinya Pry. Sch. II; Pidum Pry. School III
Kanam	Kantana	Kantana Pry. School; Furyam Primary School; Paplan Dadin Kowa; Takwar Pry. School; Yanla; Dogon Ruwa; Zallang; Tukur Pry. School; Takpasar
Kanam	Kunkyam	Tutung Pry. School; Ung. Jahun; Zongo; Dibang Ung. Yargam; Kagyal Pry. School; Kagyal Tsohon Pada; Yipmong Pry. School A; Yipmong Pry. School B; Bwalangyip; Bus'Ari; Kyankurum
Kanam	Munbutbo	Munbutbo Pry. School; Garga Kufai; Zalli Pry. School I; Zalli Pry. School II; Kyansar Pry. School I; Kyansar Pry. School II; Tsamiya; Gangar; Dandak
Kanam	Namaran	Namaran Pry. School I; Namaran Pry. School II; Kass; Dutse Kura Pry. School; Kafel Arewa; Dutsen Kura Pry. Sch.; Gobro Pry. School; Biruwa
Kanke	Ampang-East	Dungung I; Kagar; Kuwang; Kopging; Kagu; Wuye; Sharam; Mwel I; Mwel II; Dungung II
Kanke	Amper Chika 'A'	Luwarang I; Luwarang II; Lampwai; Kalashi; Chika I; Lerpye/Dibir; Amnet; Chika Ll
Kanke	Amper Chika 'B'	Gugur; Dangkang; Mimyak; Belbu; Nyinnang; Mban; Jangjwat; Lamba
Kanke	Amper Seri	Ngolong Seri; Golbong; Gunji; Kurrum; Zong Shiwer; Kalin; Golkung; Leptar; Kaler
Kanke	Garram	Tollong; Nyayit; Kurrum; Leplek; Dung; Dung Popit; Dangkem; Piri-Tiplik
Kanke	Kabwir Pada	Kabwir R. C. M; Kabwir Pada; Leptar; Myelche; Tuwan I; Tu Wan II; Chikan; Lur I; Rong; Lur II
Kanke	Kabwir/Gyangyang	Gyangyang I; Somji I; Garyang; Gomadaji; Bolkon; Longa; Gyangyang II; Somji II; Bolkon II
Kanke	Langshi	Langshi I; Langshi II; Munok; Goktok; Kaler
Kanke	Nemel	Nemel; Nekong; Lerpye; Leplek; Kalin
Langtang North	Funyalang	Funyalang (Primary School); Igbar; Funyalang/Zam
Langtang North	Jat	Lohmak Pry. School; Lohmak; Zambau/Diyan; Biller; Tippan/Budda; Sabon Layi; Kumkwam
Langtang North	Keller	Yakot Pry. School; Zamdam; Somung/Sabon Gida; Bombori; Laka/Gunung; Binding/Bobo; Keller Pry. School; Zamgwar Pry. School; Tunkun/Kurgwan; Kaplak / Gindim; Wunko/Tipsim; Binding/Bobo/Ndem
Langtang North	Kuffen	Kuffen South; Kuffen Ndong I; Kuffen Ndong II; Kuffen East I; Kuffen North; Mankot/Lazhan; Zanzat; Kangtang; Pangna/Kuyin; Bapkwai/Pyache/Kittim I; Bunkun/Nyattang; Takfa; Gwandamung; Bululu/Gbaltuk; Kuffen Ndong III; Kuffen East II; Bapkwai/Pyache/Kittim II
Langtang North	Kwallak	Kwallak Pry. School; Longbap
Langtang North	Kwanpe	Yabit/Myam Shiko; Kwanpe Pry. School; Pagwam; Tunkun/Tillam/Nyapkai; Pakuk; Kwanpe/Pagwam
Langtang North	Lipchok	Dinjor; Mantam Tam; Bali; Jal, Galadima Kumbwang; Lipchok
Langtang North	Mban/Zamko	Zambirim; Zamko Central I; Zamko Central II; Mban South; Zamko Kauye; Batkilang; Zamko North; Nwore/Pyap/Prim Nwore; Zamko Central
Langtang North	Nyer	Jidadi North; Jidadi South; Talbut/Shikal; Nyer North; Nyer Jarak; Ngwak; Danga/Shiko; Nwur
Langtang North	Pajat	Chuwam Central, Ndapfang, Wallang/Lifir; Tabat Dugu (Opp. Lgc School); Tabat Dugu; Shishiri I; Shishiri Kumbwang I; Youth Centre; Pajat I; Pajat II; Taroh/Mabe; Shishiri II; Shishiri Kumbwang II
Langtang North	Pil Gani	Pil-Gani; Pil - Gani Hausa I; Zamgwar; Pil-Dispensary; Pil-Taroh; Pil Hausa II
Langtang North	Pishe/Yashi	Ganglang; Gongani; Pishe; Zamadede; Yashi I; Yashi II
Langtang North	Reak	Reak/Nachang; Dadur Naki; Dadur Pry. School; Kensong Pry. School; Limun Pry. School; Fillap Pry. School; Vongbap; Gangtang; Zambau; Laka / Wacha; Dangre; Zamgwar
Langtang North	Waroh	Warok/Kongleb; Dibbar/Luktuk; Jwakbar/Lagan; Gabong; Gantang; Kullok; Gantang I; Gantang II
Langtang South	Fajul	Tahchang Primary School; Fajul Viewing Centre; Faya Primary School; Fatim; Pendong Primary School
Langtang South	Gamakai	Gamakai Viewing Center; Gamakai Central Viewing Center II; Gamakai Pry. School; Takalafiya Primary School; Dinshan Primary School; Timmen Primary School; Gamakai Primary School
Langtang South	Lashel	Lashel Viewing Center; Shilur Primary School; Zambang Primary School; Wubang Primary School; Shiber
Langtang South	Mabudi	Mabudi South West; Mabudi Central; Mabudi Viewing Center I; Mabudi Viewing Center II; Nagane Viewing Centre; Lokang Primary Health Center; Timchang Town Square; Mabudi Central Primary School
Langtang South	Magama	Magama Central Viewing Center; Magama Pry. School; Bolgang Primary School; Karkashi Primary School; Gidan Bua Primary School; Timjul Jigawa Town Square; Ruwan Doka Primary School
Langtang South	Sabon Gida	Sabon Gida Primary School; Sabon Gida Viewing Center; Tahdum Primary School; Nahuta District Office; Nahuta Village; Gangnim Primary School; Kwaikong Primary School; Nahuta Viewing Center
Langtang South	Talgwang	Talgwang Viewing Center; Talgwang Primary School; Mangwang Primary School; Timfin Primary School; Kamkun Central Market Square; Kamkun Pry. School
Langtang South	Timbol	Timbol Viewing Center; Timbol Pri. Sch; Tongchin Market Square; Bolya Central Field; Kayarda Primary School; Jemkur Primary School; Gidan Abada Primary School; Jigawa -Timbol Central Square
Langtang South	Turaki	Turaki Central Market Square; Turaki Pri. Sch; Nasarawa Primary School; Dorowa Primary School; Mahanga Primary School; Mile Four Primary School; Kanana Primary School; Timshat Primary School; Turaki West
Mangu	Ampang West	Ampang I; Ampang II; Pushik I; Pushik II; Perka; Bwonpe; B/Tim; Npat; Kubwat; Kopji; Amkwe; Kopshu; Bidol; Fwam; Perka II; Kopji II; Kopshu II; Ampang
Mangu	Chanso	Ang. Sarki I; Ang. Sarki II; Pyemgiji I; Badni Pada; Badni Pry. School; Dukli I; Dukli II; Shangal; Vokti; Dukli Sabon Layi; Pyemgiji II
Mangu	Gindiri I	Kasuwa Ali I; Kasuwa Ali II; Nagwak I; Nagwak II; Ang. Mission I; Ang. Mission II; Ang. Mission II1; Kasuwa Ali III
Mangu	Gindiri II	Bauda I; Bauda II; Bauda II1; Dalang; Babarinji; Kotu I; Kotu II; Kasuwa I; Kasuwa II; Kasuwa II1; Sabon Layi
Mangu	Jannaret	Jannaret; Pyemgiji; Ang. Baraya Mission I; Sabon Gari; Ang. Baraya Mission II
Mangu	Jipal/Chakfem	Kaper I; Bul/Kwa; Male/Z; Mishkaham; Madaki Wambai; Kabum; Rundum; Mwar; Narohos; Wubel/C; Kabung Manja I; Kabuk; Manden; Tim; Kabung Manja II
Mangu	Kadunu	Kasuwa; Ramani; Doss/Febas/Kassa I; Doss/Febas/Kassa II; Abdullahi; Kwanga; Gwomgada; Gwomjang
Mangu	Kerang	Madaki Tim; Miss Kerang/Kwahas; Lea Primary School Kerang Ntulu; Dikibin; Fomulam; Fwangkwak; Jing; Kerang Baraya; T/Kerang/Mish II; T/Kerang/Mish II1; Kon; Tim Gule; Kerang Town; Funguya; Konven; Mish Kerang/Kwahas; Fwang Jing
Mangu	Kombun	Kombun I; Ang Galadima; Perka; Wushi; Duru; Madaki I; Madaki II; Hiktup; Sulwa Pry. School; Ruvwang; Millet; Bwai; Gindiri; Chisu; Fungzai; Murish; Ruff; Duhur
Mangu	Langai	Langai I; Langai II; Langai II1; Sauri Baya; Kongong; Galadima; Furshi Tiddy; Furshi Haika; Langai IV; Konggong
Mangu	Mangu I	Ang. Kasuwa I; Ang. Kasuwa II; Ang. Kasuwa II1; Ang. Kasuwa IV; Alohom; Ang. Madaki I; Ang. Hausawa I; Ang. Hausawa II; Rampia I; Rampia II; Ang. Madaki II; Ang. Madaki III; Ntam; Ang. Hausawa III; Ang. Hausawa IV; Ang. Madaki Ekan I; Ang. Madaki Ekan II
Mangu	Mangu II	Gate I Mangu Township Stadium Sabon Layi Road (Ang. Sarki I( Mrm Islamic Nurs. & Pry Sch Jibwis Man; Gate II Mangu Township Stadium Gindiri Road (Ang. Sarki II( Mrm Islamic Nurs. & Pry Sch Jibwis Mang; Near State Agric Office, Mangu (Ang. Sarki III( Mrm Islamic Nurs. & Pry Sch Jibwis Mangu)); Ncha; Jwakkom; Leprosy Centre; Tyop; Ang. Madaki I; Ang. Madaki II; Ang. Sarki IV; Ang. Madaki III
Mangu	Mangun	Ang. Madaki/Gidan Mai; Tochar/Ang. Hausawa; Tsohon Kotu I; Bikwang/Karyam; Gulang; Yilpia; Yemdung; Dyis/Lamshet; Langkang/Kopnanle; Kining/Paint, Long; Dankong/Patjwar; Gung / De; Tsohon Kotu II
Mangu	Mangu Halle	Mangu Halle Kasuwa I; Mangu Halle; Sabon Gari; Kinat I; Kinat II; Gyambwas; Farinkasa; Mairana; Dutsen Lamba; Kwahas Lalek; Tudun Sardauna; Maitumbi I; Maitum Bi II; Kantoma; Mangu Halle Kasuwa II
Mangu	Pan Yam	Angwan Sarki I; Ang. Sarki II; Ang. Sarki II1; Ang. Madaki I; Ang. Madaki II; Kwa; Mading; Jwak; Kwahas; Daika I; Daika II; Ajing; Larkas I; Larkas II; Kombili; Changal; Washna; Niyes; Leet; Kogul; Kopal I; Bwor; Depuri; Kopal II
Mangu	Pushit	Ang. Sarki I; Ang. Sarki II; Mararaba I; Mararaba II; Tilengpat; Ten; Jwakji I; Mil; Pukah; Vodni; Komtul; Gwet; Aper I; Aper II; Jwakji II; Kopna; Lawet; Larka'At
Mikang	Baltep	Kongwan; Pangoetip; Din L. E. A Pry. School; Talme; Baltep; Din. L. E. A. School
Mikang	Garkawa Central	Longkrom; Anguwan Hausawa; Gimgim S/Ang. Jukun; Unguwan Galadima
Mikang	Garkawa North	Pitop N. R. C. M. School; Gimgim North Ekan School; Shoshal; Government College
Mikang	Garkawa North East	Kila North Rhota; Jimakwi; Kongnati; Wai/Gwar; Lanil Rhota; Pensong
Mikang	Koenoem 'A'	Liifidi Clinic; Zomo Pry. School; Nwoop; Zomo (P. H. C.)
Mikang	Koenoem 'B'	Pangshot; Kongya Pry. School; Kongbozuk; Tingzam
Mikang	Lalin	Baltei; Kongung; Kongung (Mdega'Am); Kopgwan; Lalin Pry. Sch. I; Puyun; Betkang; Gabiet; Muanpus; Lakai; Lalin Pry. Sch. II
Mikang	Piapung 'A'	Gwotkat; Peokat; Gotlong; Koetes Pry. School
Mikang	Piapung 'B'	Moelai; Soemdok; Fiaber (P. H. C); Mboer; Zamkoe Op; Anguwan Hausawa I; Anguwan Hausawa II; Fiaber (G. S. S.)
Mikang	Tunkus	Tunkus Pry. School; Tunkus R. C. M School; Tunkus Market Square; Ka'Anlong Pry. School; Shankop; Luham Pry. School; Tenglit; Labi Pry. School; Tunkus (Bakin Rijiya)
Pankshin	Chip	Khiduhun; Kapil I; Kapil II; Pyabor; Jepmidyel; Kwalla; Bakwar; Longkat; Nadu; Mungkohot; Buzuk; Jibam; Kwarmut; Dimmai; Kopshakap
Pankshin	Dok-Pai	Ngolong Dok; Bwer; Kamchik; Nyong; Ngolong Ban; Tangol; Kwassam
Pankshin	Fier	Tanache I; Tanache II; Golong Takkas; Mel Takwas; Koromlu; Purtuk; Bumnan; Nyelleng; Kadyin; Mudel; Gwabi Pada; Mier
Pankshin	Jiblik	Jiblik; Amnat; Guza; Kustim; Tingkum; Dyis; Abwor; Angwan Galadima; Gibang; Pangwan; Kagu; Dangmet; Tellengdyes; Gutong; Laplek
Pankshin	Kadung	Kumbul I; Kumbul II; Kadung Pada; Gilling; Jivir; Gurrup; Mwel
Pankshin	Kangshu	Jannaret; Kwandari; Wuya; Wushima; Tinjim; Kwanka
Pankshin	Lankan	Jak; Kapil; R. C. M Lankan; Asa; Ningkut; Tongfom I; Tongfom II; Lunchan; Genyer; Jing; Rafin Sanyi; Zong; Kajing; Kumurum; Akong; Nungwus; Jwakkaat
Pankshin	Pankshin Central	Nefur I; School Of Health & Technology I; Angwan Galadima I; Kururuwanka Banza I; Ner; Dilla; Vel I; Duk; Wulmi; New Layout I; Gss Pankshin I; Gss Pankshin II; Bwarak; Fed. College Of Education; Tambes I; Nefur II; School Of Health & Technology II; Angwan Galadima II; Kururuwanka Banza II; Vel II; New Layout II; Tambes II
Pankshin	Pankshin Chigwong	Chigwong; Kangyi; Wuseli; Balang Shipang; Balang Mudat; Balang Kalep I; Balang Kalep II; Ventul; Kubang
Pankshin	Pankshin South (Belning)	Kor; Tayin; Gung; Manget; Dungye; Dungkolom; Langkung; Kullukning
Pankshin	Wokkos	Iskep/Butal; Jimin; Dang; Dikkal; Tazuk I; Tazuk II; Gille; Kwalla; Mantom; Lepshit
Qua'An Pan	Bwall	Bwall Central/Tanba; Geopil; Nkum A; Nkum B; Nakum Ung. Ishaya 'A'; Nakum Ung. Ishaya 'B'
Qua'An Pan	Doemak-Goechim	Kopdangloe; Funglet; Koe Lagan I; Koe Lagan II; Gyerdo'Op; Latok I; Latok II; Bong
Qua'An Pan	Doemak-Koplong	Gares Ang. Dashe Along Kwa Road; Koplong/Ang. Hausawa; Kopar; Kopdana'An; Ba'Al; Dungdep; Ba'Ap-G. S. S. Doemak; Dungdaniang
Qua'An Pan	Dokan Kasuwa	Ung. Hausawa I; Ung. Hausawa II; Lo'Otleet; Kwanoeng; Kop Guwam; Espat; Yilpia
Qua'An Pan	Kurgwi	Angwa. Ankwai; Ampia I; Ampia II; Kurgwi North I; Kurgwi North II; Poeyak; Gidan Bube; Namu Road; Ang. Galadima I; Ang. Galadima II; Ang. Loko I; Ang. Loko II; Ang. Dorowa I; Dorowa Kudu I; Dorowa Kudu II; Ang. Dorowa II; Kurgwi Central I; Kurgwi Central II; Ung. Wakili I; Ung. Wakili II; Ung. Wakili; Hamfu'Ul
Qua'An Pan	Kwalla Moeda	Ekan Pry. School Kwalla - Lang; Nadu; Wayil/Kaiko; R. C. M Pry. School Kwalla Town I; R. C. M Pry. School, Kwalla Town II; Pangnaan; Panglit; Namess; Moendoeshik; Kopwarmak; Pry. School Kopboetpang; Kopdakum; Geopin; Ung. Musa Dayil Kadaura Biyi; Kopdu/Parina'An
Qua'An Pan	Kwalla Yitla'Ar	Pry. School Chim Koplong; Lopmoejar; Pry. School, Kopfogom; Ung. Hausawa Yitlaar; Goe'Es; Kopman Tung Ung. Dadoen; Loegoet
Qua'An Pan	Kwande	Ung. Hausawa I; Ung. Hausawa II; Gidan Dabat; Ung. Madaki I; Ung. Madaki II; Ung. Magajingari; Baban Fadama; Ung. Suman I; Ung. Suman II; Ung. Galadima T. I; Ung. Galadima T. II; Ung. Tofa; Ung. Babawul; Ung. Dakokol; Ung. Damen; Npap; Paplat; Sabon Gida; Jirim; Longku Gamji I; Longku Gamji II; Ung. Hausawa B/Ciyawa I; Ung. Hausawa B/Ciyawa II; Ung. Bature I; Ung. Bature II; Ung. Likita Turniang; Ung. Kwando; Ung. Kundum A & B; Janyaro I; Janyaro II; Jepluk; Nwum/Pang South; Ampia
Qua'An Pan	Kwang	Koplong; Tatoeng; Dardang; Varam; Fujing/Fuyang; Goedugun; Poekongloejer
Qua'An Pan	Namu	Ung. Yashi Namu I; Ung. Yashi Namu II; Motor Park Namu I; Motor Park Namu II; Kofar Danbaba; Gindin Rimi I; Gindin Rimi II; Kofar Simon Dama; Kofar Uban Doma; Kofar Adamu I; Kofar Adamu II; Kofar Sakari; Kofar Sangari I; Kofar Sangari II; Primary School, Pandam; Koprume; Primary School Aningo; Kopdogo; Hancin Kare; Janta; Kwari I; Kwari II; Ung. Janta I; Ung. Janta II; Loot-Leet; Dajagar; Dakup; Ung. Ishaya Dune; Ung. Goewam; Ung. Haliku; Gungsunas; Langkaku; Ung. Bot; Nkum; Shindai; Kadaura; Koplong Namu; Kayarda; Njak; Dadin Kowa; Ntoeroem
Riyom	Attakar	Attakar Pry. School; Nomadic Sch. Tinariya; Uchan; Toro
Riyom	Bum	Fangroi Pry. School Bum; Dantan Kpwak School; Koyongtang Bum; Koroda; Datapwang; Dochai; Danwal L. G. E. A Pryl School; Korotsol; Bum Ex-School I; Bum Ex-School II
Riyom	Danto	Danto Pry. School Ganawuri; Korokwallam Ganawuri; Goneroi; Dantra Ekan Pry. Sch. I; Kwakwi Pry School; Koroncho Pry. School; Kwakwi Railway Station; Nkun I; Nkun II; Gura Pry. School; Danto Pry. School; Dantra Ekan Pry . Sch. II; Dantra Ekan Pry . Sch. III
Riyom	Jol/Kwi	Jol Primary School; Jol Pry. School ( Ranjol); Tanjol Pry. School; Rafin Accah Pry. School; Daku Pry. School; Kwi Pry. School; Chiroma Abdullahi; Noro 'Kwi'; Tashek 'Jol'; Darin 'Davwak'; Tanjol Pry. Sch. (Tara/Lomwash)
Riyom	Ra-Hoss	Ra-Hoss Pry. School; Ra-Hoss Daji; Mere Pry. School; Makera Market; Gol-Hoss Pry. School
Riyom	Rim	Ekan Pry. School, Rim; Wereng Rim Pry. School; Dalo/Chiroma; Torok Wereng; Janda Sharu; Diyan/Gako Pry. School; Ekan Primary School Rim
Riyom	Riyom	L. G. E. A. Pry. Sch Riyom; Riyom Community Hall; School Of Home Economics (Agric); Dabwam Bye I; Wereng Kerana I; Wereng Kerana II; Wereng R. C. M. (Baten); Lotyeng Clinic; Wereng Camp; Kuru Station; L. G. E. A Riyom (Old Dispensary)
Riyom	Sharubutu	Sharubutu Pry. School, Bachi; Sharubutu (Kyeng); Fang Bachi; Shonong Bachi Pri Sch(Shonong Bachi); Shonong Bachi Pri. Sch(Shonong Jekko); Lwa Pry. School; Shong Pry. School I; Banga I; Banga II; Shonong 'Bachi
Riyom	Sopp	Ekan Pry. Sch. Sopp I; Dajak Pry. School; Tom-Gangare I; Kak; Ekan Pry. Sch . Sopp II; Tom Gangare
Riyom	Ta-Hoss	Ta-Hoss Pry. Sch. I; Ta-Hoss Daji; Kwama; Jebbu Pry. School; Ta-Hoss Pry. Sch . II
Shendam	Derteng	Duan Kwan I; Hambiak; Gaklang; Durka; Jayu; Ringlong; Duankwan II
Shendam	Kalong	Demshin Pry. School; Demshin Ung. Hata; Ungwan Rina; Ungwan Walong; Longteng Bante; Kalong East I; Dungram; Kalong I; Jimdu'Ut; Luwou; Kalong Ung Dadi; Shargang; Gongvel; Goesa Gongvel; Goesa Ung. Zam; Ungwan Dungkul; Wali; Kalong II; Kalong East II
Shendam	Kurungbau (A)	Kwapjur I; Pukot; Kurungbou “A”; Nyuun; Tumbi; Shiankwam; Tukung; Longvel I; Longvel II; Kwapjur II; Longvel III
Shendam	Kurungbau (B)	Dolori; Ajikamai; Ung. Burmawa; Lukushi Central; Gomodaji; Sabon Layi; Lakushi; Gongvel; Yamini Ung / Hausawa I; Lawur; Yamini T. Dorowa; Ungwan Mutum; Yamini Central I; Rijiyan Giwa; Yamini Central II; Yamini Ung/ Hausawa II
Shendam	Moekat	Company Unit; Kuka Ung. Ali; Kuka Ung. Galadima I; Kuka Pry. School; Kuka Baptist; Nzam Kuka; Kuka Market; Pape; Moekat Town I; Moekat Npoll I; Moekat Pry. Sch. I; Moekat Pry. Sch. II; Kuka Ung. Galadima II; Moekat Town II; Moekat Npoll II
Shendam	Pangshom	Pangshoom; Kwapkuwa; Sokluut Luwa; Sokluut Lukawap; Fa'Anji; Ngaras; Poediel I; Tengzet; Gung; Njak I; Njak II; Zarkat; Toenadung; Gidan Adamu; Dokan Tofa; Poediel II
Shendam	Poeship	Ntuer I; Ntiamham; Shanlang; Shepwan; Nbaal Padama; Nder; Zamlong; Bakin Kogi Pry. Sch I; Kurwat; Tsoro; Bakin Kogi Pry. Sch II; Ntuer II
Shendam	Shendam Central (A)	Derjot I; Congo; Pangtumu; Luwokur North; Old L. G. C. Secretariat; Long Goemai Palance; Old Motor Park; Ung. Hausawa North; Shinkwan; G. S. S. Shendam; Kurung Lazai; Kurunag Namodu; Kopgalwa; Kurung L. Nakwan; Mai. Ung. Longkat; Kwapkoshe; Kwansan; Kulung; Derjot II; Long Goemai Palace
Shendam	Shendam Central (B)	Luwokur South I; Ajikamai I; Kalong Road 'A' I; Dorok Street South I; Garkawa Street 'A'; Yargam Street; Ung. Hausawa South; G. R. A; Ungwan Wambai; L. E. A Pry. School I; Federal Lowcost; Kulung; Yargam South (B); Luwokur South II; Ajikamai II; Dorok Street South II; Garkawa Street 'B'; Ung. Hausawa Street; L. E. A Pry. School II
Shendam	Shimankar	Biembiem I; Shimankar I; Makera Pry. School; Biembiem Hambang I; Ung. Zuru; Biembiem Dam; Ndayak I; Yitpia; Poeteng; Manggap; New Market; Kawan; Biembiem II; Ndayak II; Manggap II; Shimankar II; Biembiem Hambang II
Wase	Bashar	Area Court; Ung. Galadima I; Ung. Galadima II; Janbalde; Murai 'Gwaram'; Pry. School Madaci; Pry. School Gaji; Takalafiya; Sabon Layi; Pry. School Safiyo; Dogon Ruwa; Tapgan Dorina
Wase	Danbiram	Central Pry. Sch. Wase I; Central Pry. Sch. Wase II; Ung. Marafa; G. S. S/Kauran Sarki East; Kauran Sarki West I; Ung. Galadima; Cottage Hospital; Ung. Zongo; Ung. Sayawa Lowcost; Kauran Sarki West II
Wase	Gudus	Ung. Chiroma; Ung. Galadima; Pry. School Kunkyam; Kungurmi; Lop Burum; Ung Madaki Yuli I; Ung Madaki Yuli II; Pry. Sch. Yuli Galadi; Pry. School Ginyir; Jarmai Gamu; Ung. Madaki Gudus
Wase	Kumbong	Ung. Bala; Ung. Chiroma
Wase	Kumbur	Pry. School Kumbur; Chiwi (Timshat); Jigawan Audu; Timuat/Sherma; Pry. School Singha; Pry School G.(Kogi) I; Pry School G.(Kogi) II; Pry. School Gamji; Pry. Sch. Chapkwai I; Pry. Sch. Chapkwai II; Pry. School, Yal; Ung. Ubandoma; Mahanga Zhir; Pry. Sch. Wadatan Kasuwa I; Pry. Sch. Wadatan Kasuwa II; Farin Ruwa; Kawo Tiv; Jawuri Fulani; Pry. School, Wadatan Arewa; Lagan Ubandoma
Wase	Kuyambana	Ung. Gobirawa; Ung. Burmawa; Area Court/Ung. Matsinta; Ung. Karofi; Pry. School, U/Kuyambana; V. R. T. B/Ruganjodi; Ung. Chiroma; Pry. School, U/Mallam Adama; Ung. Madaki
Wase	Mavo	Ung. Sarkin Yaki; Ung. Danbiram; G. S. S. Mavo; Ung. Tsakuwa; Kanwa; Pry. School, Tsamiya; Nyingiling; Tenam; Sabon Gida Mavo; Bakin Rijiya
Wase	Nyalum/Kampani	Nyalum Pry Sch; U/Madaki Nyalum; Bunyun; Zak; Sabon Gari; Pry. Sch. Kampani I; Pry. Sch. Kampani II; Bangalala; Aduwa; Ung. Galadima; Zurak Galadima
Wase	Saluwe	Ung. Galadima(Turaki); Namaram; Pry. School, Takalafiya; Pry. School, Kuka; Pry. School, Gyambar
Wase	Wase Tofa	Wase Tofa; Ung. Gar. Pry. School; Pako; Pry. School, Zango/Gbak; Gandu; Pry. School, Kogin Kasa; Wandai
Wase	Yola Wakat	Pry. School Yola Wakat; Gumshar; Damna Laka; Pry. School, Nassarawa; Kinkas; Pry. School, Lamba/Kulwa; Dangyam; Yiplak; Dem
