= 2019 Plateau State gubernatorial election =

2019 gubernatorial election in Plateau State, Nigeria

- March 9, 2019
Nominee	Simon Lalong	Jeremiah Useni
Party	APC	PDP
Running mate	Sonni Gwanle Tyoden	Ben Shignugul
Popular vote	595,582	546,813
Governor before election
Simon Lalong
APC
Elected Governor
Simon Lalong
APC

The 2019 Plateau State gubernatorial election in Nigeria occurred on March 9, 2019. Incumbent APC Governor Simon Lalong won re-election for a second term, defeating PDP Jerry Useni and several minor party candidates.

Simon Lalong emerged APC gubernatorial candidate after he was returned as the sole candidate. He picked Sonni Gwanle Tyoden as his running mate. Jeremiah Useni was the PDP candidate with Ben Shignugul as his running mate. 24 candidates contested in the election.

== Electoral system ==
The Governor of Plateau is elected using the plurality voting system.

== Primary election ==
=== APC primary ===
The APC primary election was held on September 30, 2018. Simon Lalong won the primary election after he was returned as the sole candidate. He picked Sonni Gwanle Tyoden as his running mate.

=== PDP primary ===
The PDP primary election was held on September 30, 2018. Jerry Useni won the primary election polling 1,018 votes against 12 other candidates. His closest rival was Johnbull Shekarau, who came second with 340 votes. He picked Ben Shignugul as his running mate.

== Results ==
A total number of 24 candidates registered with the Independent National Electoral Commission to contest in the election.

The total number of registered voters in the state was 2,480,455, while 1,157,025 voters were accredited. Total number of votes cast was 1,176,142, while number of valid votes was 1,159,954. Rejected votes were 16,188.

Candidate	Party	Votes	%
Simon Lalong	All Progressives Congress	595,582	51.35
Jerry Useni	People's Democratic Party	546,813	47.14
Other candidates		17,559	1.51
Total		1,159,954	100.00
Valid votes		1,159,954	98.62
Invalid/blank votes		16,188	1.38
Total votes		1,176,142	100.00
Registered voters/turnout		2,480,455	47.42
Source: Daily Trust, This Day

=== By local government area ===
Here are the results of the election by local government area for the two major parties. The total valid votes of 1,159,954 represents the 24 political parties that participated in the election. Blue represents LGAs won by Simon Lalong. Green represents LGAs won by Jeremiah Useni.

LGA	Simon Lalong APC		Jeremiah Useni PDP		Total votes
LGA	#	%	#	%	#
Jos East	18,602		7,994		
Kanke	23,360		22,831		
Langtang North	18,979		40,519		
Barkin Ladi	17,080		44,529		
Bokkos	27,561		26,700		
Bassa	30,441		33,192		
Langtang South	14,470		18,868		
Pankshin	36,215		24,939		
Mikang	15,150		11,703		
Kanam	55,338		22,432		
Jos South	33,475		91,846		
Jos North	109,161		14,290		
Wase	37,593		27,485		
Mangu	51,895		43,555		
Riyom	12,720		24,017		
Qua'an Pan	31,962		20,939		
Shendam	61,798		17,115		
Totals	595,582		546,813		1,159,954
