= Yusuf Adamu Gagdi =

Nigerian politician (born 1980)

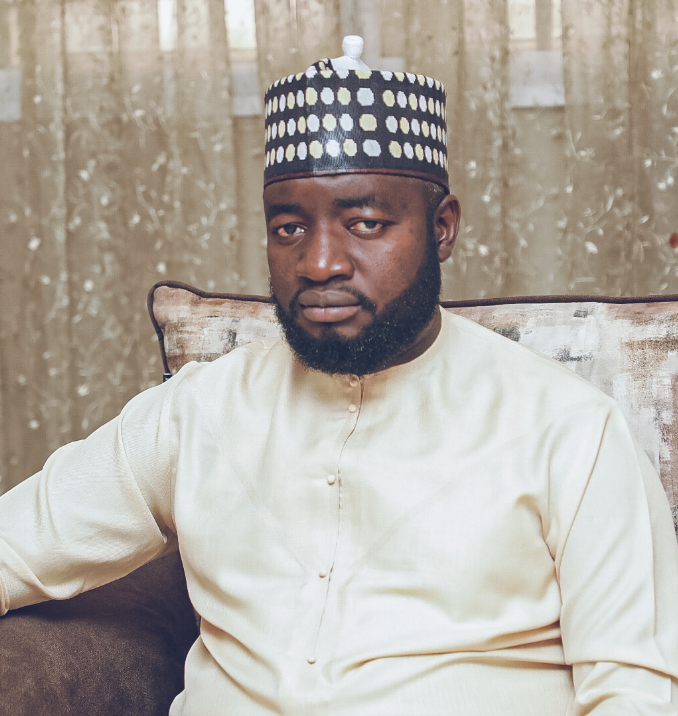
Yusuf Gagdi

Yusuf Adamu Gagdi (born 5 November 1980) is a politician of the All Progressives Congress from Plateau State, Nigeria. He is a member of the House of Representatives of Nigeria from Pankshin/Kanam/Kanke federal constituency of Plateau State in the 9th Nigeria National Assembly.

== Biography ==
He was born on 5 November 1980 in Gum-Gagdi Village, Kanam, Nigeria to Mallam Adamu Gagdi and Mallama Hauwa’u Gagdi. He went to the University of Jos. He was elected to the house on 11 June 2019, He is currently Chair of the House Navy Committee. He was reelected for a second term in 2023.

== Personal life ==
He is married to Maryam Salem Hassan (m. 2010) with whom he has 7 children, Jemimah (m. ~2020), and Laylah (m. ~2023)
