= Plateau North senatorial district =

Senatorial district in Nigeria

Plateau North senatorial district in Plateau State covers six local government areas, namely Barkin-Ladi, Bassa, Jos East, Jos North, Jos South, and Riyom. Plateau North is currently represented in the Senate by Pam Mwadkon Dachungyang of the Action Democratic Party, ADP.

== List of senators representing Plateau North ==
Senator	Party	Year	Assembly	Electoral history
Davou Zang	Peoples Democratic Party	3 June 1999 – 3 June 2003	4th	
Timothy Adudu	All Nigeria Peoples Party	3 June 2003 – 5 June 2007	5th	
Gyang Dantong	Peoples Democratic Party	5 June 2007 – 8 July 2012	6th 7th	Died in office
Gyang Pwajok	Peoples Democratic Party	16 October 2012 – 6 June 2015	7th	Elected to complete Dantong's term
Jonah Jang	Peoples Democratic Party	9 June 2015 – 9 June 2019	8th	
Istifanus Gyang	Peoples Democratic Party	11 June 2019 – 11 June 2023	9th	
Simon Mwadkwon	Peoples Democratic Party	13 June 2023 – 23 October 2023	10th	Sacked by an Appeal Court
Pam Dachungyang	Action Democratic Party	13 February 2024 – present	10th	
