= Plateau South senatorial district =

Plateau South senatorial district covers six local governments namely, Langtang North, Langtang South, Mikang, Qua’anpan, Shendam, and Wase.

== List of senators representing Plateau South ==
Senator	Party	Year	Assembly	Electoral history
Silas Janfa	Peoples Democratic Party	3 June 1999 – 3 June 2003	4th	
Cosmas Niagwan	Peoples Democratic Party	3 June 2003 – 5 June 2007	5th	
John Shagaya	Peoples Democratic Party	5 June 2007 – 6 June 2011	6th	
Victor Lar	Peoples Democratic Party	6 June 2011 – 6 June 2015	7th	
Jeremiah Useni	Peoples Democratic Party	9 June 2015 – 9 June 2019	8th	
Ignatius Datong Longjan	All Progressives Congress	11 June 2019 – 10 February 2020	9th	
Nora Daduut	All Progressives Congress	5 December 2020 – 11 June 2023	9th	Bye Election
Napoleon Bali	Peoples Democratic Party	13 June 2023 – 7 November 2023	10th	Sacked by an Appeal Court
Simon Lalong	All Progressives Congress	20 December 2023 – present	10th	
