= Plateau Central senatorial district =

Senatorial district in Nigeria

Plateau Central senatorial district in Plateau State in Nigeria covers five local government areas which consists Bokkos, Mangu, Pankshin, Kanke and Kanam. The headquarters (collation centre) of this senate district is Panskhin. Plateau Central is currently represented in the Senate by Diket Plang of the All Progressives Congress, APC.

Musician, producer, blogger and social media influencer Makut Alfred Mashat hails from Bokkos local Government in Plateau central senatorial district.

== List of senators representing Plateau Central ==
Senator	Party	Year	Assembly	Electoral history
Ibrahim Mantu	Peoples Democratic Party	3 June 1999 – 5 June 2007	4th 5th	Deputy president of the Senate
Satty Davies Gogwim	Action Congress of Nigeria	5 June 2007 – 6 June 2011	6th	
Joshua Dariye	Labour Party	6 June 2011 – 9 June 2019	7th 8th	
Hezekiah Dimka	All Progressives Congress	11 June 2019 – 11 June 2023	9th	
Diket Plang	All Progressives Congress	13 June 2023 – present	10th	
