= 2019 Nigerian House of Representatives elections in Plateau State =

The 2019 Nigerian House of Representatives elections in Plateau State was held on February 23, 2019, to elect members of the House of Representatives to represent Plateau State, Nigeria.

== Overview ==
Affiliation	Party		Total
Affiliation	APC	PDP	Total
Before Election	2	6	8
After Election	4	4	8

== Summary ==
District	Incumbent	Party	Elected Rep	Party
Barkin Ladi/Riyom	Istifanus Gyang	PDP	Simon Mwadkwon	PDP
Bokkos/Mangu	Solomon Maren	PDP	Solomon Maren	PDP
Jos North/Bassa	Suleiman Kwande	APC	Haruna Maitala	APC
Jos South/Jos East	Gyang Pwajok	PDP	Dachung Musa Bagos	PDP
Kanke/Pankshin/Kanam	Timothy Golu	PDP	Gagdi Adamu Yusuf	APC
Langtang North/Langtang South	Beni Butmaklar	PDP	Beni Lar	PDP
Mikang/Qua’an/Pan/Shedam	Johnbull Shekarau	PDP	Komsol Longgap	APC
Wase	Ahmed Idris Wase	APC	Ahmed Idris	APC

== Results ==
=== Barkin Ladi/Riyom ===
A total of 6 candidates registered with the Independent National Electoral Commission to contest in the election. PDP candidate Simon Mwadkwon won the election, defeating APC Bitrus Dangwel Tawal and 4 other party candidates. Mwadkwon received 72.06% of the votes, while Tawal received 27.79%.

2019 Nigerian House of Representatives election in Plateau State
Party	Candidate	Votes	%
PDP	Simon Mwadkwon	64,291	72.06%
APC	Bitrus Dangwel Tawal	24,796	27.79%
Others		129	0.14%
Total votes		89,216	100%
PDP hold			

=== Bokkos/Mangu ===
A total of 8 candidates registered with the Independent National Electoral Commission to contest in the election. PDP candidate Solomon Maren won the election, defeating APC Haruna Danjuma. Maren received 49.97% of the votes, while Danjuma received 40.98%.

2019 Nigerian House of Representatives election in Plateau State
Party	Candidate	Votes	%
PDP	Solomon Maren	71,903	49.97%
APC	Haruna Danjuma	58,964	40.98%
Others		13,022	9.05%
Total votes		143,889	100%
PDP hold			

=== Jos North/Bassa ===
A total of 15 candidates registered with the Independent National Electoral Commission to contest in the election. APC candidate Haruna Maitala won the election, defeating PDP Jonathan Dabo and 13 other party candidates. Maitala received 48.52% of the votes, while Dabo received 47.87%.

2019 Nigerian House of Representatives election in Plateau State
Party	Candidate	Votes	%
APC	Haruna Maitala	118,774	48.52%
PDP	Jonathan Dabo	117,175	47.87%
Others		8,839	3.61%
Total votes		244,788	100%
APC hold			

=== Jos South/Jos East ===
A total of 12 candidates registered with the Independent National Electoral Commission to contest in the election. PDP candidate Dachung Musa Bagos won the election, defeating APC Pam Dongs and 10 other candidates. Bagos received 75.01% of the votes, while Dongs received 24.09%.

2019 Nigerian House of Representatives election in Plateau State
Party	Candidate	Votes	%
PDP	Dachung Musa Bagos	117,114	75.01%
APC	Pam Dongs	37,617	24.09%
Others		1,395	0.89%
Total votes		156,126	100%
PDP hold			

=== Kanke/Pankshin/Kanam ===
A total of 10 candidates registered with the Independent National Electoral Commission to contest in the election. APC candidate Gagdi Adamu Yusuf won the election, defeating PDP Timothy Golu and 8 other candidates. Yusuf received 49.84% of the votes, while Golu received 48.98%.

2019 Nigerian House of Representatives election in Plateau State
Party	Candidate	Votes	%
APC	Gagdi Adamu Yusuf	80,373	49.84%
PDP	Timothy Golu	78,987	48.98%
Others		1,891	1.17%
Total votes		161,251	100%
APC hold			

=== Langtang North/Langtang South ===
A total of 4 candidates registered with the Independent National Electoral Commission to contest in the election. PDP candidate Beni Lar won the election, defeating APC Nandang Bako and 2 other party candidates. Lar received 65.76% of the votes, while Bako received 33.48%.

2019 Nigerian House of Representatives election in Plateau State
Party	Candidate	Votes	%
PDP	Beni Lar	53,726	65.76%
APC	Nandang Bako	27,353	33.48%
Others		615	0.75%
Total votes		81,694	100%
PDP hold			

=== Mikang/Qua’an/Pan/Shedam ===
A total of 8 candidates registered with the Independent National Electoral Commission to contest in the election. APC candidate Komsol Longgap won the election, defeating PDP Johnbull Shekarau and 6 other party candidates. Longgap received 56.14% of the votes, while Shekarau received 43.04%.

2019 Nigerian House of Representatives election in Plateau State
Party	Candidate	Votes	%
APC	Komsol Longgap	69,546	56.14%
PDP	Johnbull Shekarau	53,321	43.04%
Others		1,013	0.82%
Total votes		123,880	100%
APC hold			

=== Wase ===
A total of 8 candidates registered with the Independent National Electoral Commission to contest in the election. APC candidate Ahmed Idris won the election, defeating PDP Suleiman Umar and 6 other party candidates. Idris received 54.94% of the votes, while Umar received 44.59%.

2019 Nigerian House of Representatives election in Plateau State
Party	Candidate	Votes	%
APC	Ahmed Idris	32,445	54.94%
PDP	Suleiman Umar	26,335	44.59%
Others		278	0.47%
Total votes		59,058	100%
APC hold			
