= 2019 Nigerian Senate elections in Plateau State =

2019 Nigerian Senate election in Plateau State

The 2019 Nigerian Senate election in Plateau State was held on February 23, 2019, to elect members of the Nigerian Senate to represent Plateau State. Ignatius Datong Longjan representing Plateau South and Hezekiah Ayuba Dimka representing Plateau Central all won on the platform of All Progressives Congress while Istifanus Gyang representing Plateau North won on the platform of Peoples Democratic Party.

== Overview ==
Affiliation	Party		Total
Affiliation	PDP	APC	Total
Before Election	2	1	3
After Election	1	2	3

== Summary ==
District	Incumbent	Party	Elected Senator	Party
Plateau South	Jeremiah Useni	PDP	Ignatius Datong Longjan	APC
Plateau Central	Joshua Dariye	APC	Hezekiah Ayuba Dimka	APC
Plateau North	Jonah Jang	PDP	Istifanus Gyang	PDP

== Results ==
=== Plateau South ===
A total of 12 candidates registered with the Independent National Electoral Commission to contest in the election. APC candidate Ignatius Datong Longjan won the election, defeating PDP candidate, Kefas Peter Dandam and 10 other party candidates. Datong scored 140,918 votes, while PDP candidate Dansam scored 132,441 votes.

2019 Nigerian Senate election in Plateau State
Party	Candidate	Votes	%
APC	Ignatius Datong Longjan	140,918	
PDP	Kefas Peter Dandam	132,441	
Others			
Total votes		275,383	100%
APC hold			

=== Plateau Central ===
A total of 14 candidates registered with the Independent National Electoral Commission to contest in the election. APC candidate Hezekiah Ayuba Dimka won the election, defeating PDP candidate David Shikfu Parradang and 12 other party candidates. Dimka pulled 149,457 votes, while PDP candidate Parradang scored 145,048 votes.

2019 Nigerian Senate election in Plateau State
Party	Candidate	Votes	%
APC	Hezekiah Ayuba Dimka	149,457	
PDP	David Shikfu Parradang	145,048	
Others			
Total votes		309,094	100%
APC hold			

=== Plateau North ===
A total of 14 candidates registered with the Independent National Electoral Commission to contest in the election. PDP candidate Istifanus Gyang won the election, defeating APC candidate, Rufus Bature and 12 other party candidates. Gyang pulled 269,555 votes to defeat the APC Candidate, Bature who scored 171,233 votes.

2019 Nigerian Senate election in Plateau State
Party	Candidate	Votes	%
APC	Istifanus Gyang	269,555	
PDP	Rufus Bature	171,233	
Others			
Total votes		463,904	100%
PDP hold			
