= Istifanus Gyang =

Nigerian politician

Personal details
- Born: 1964 (age 61–62)
- Education: Government Secondary School
- Alma mater: Ahmadu Bello University; University of Jos
- Occupation: Senator

Istifanus Gyang (born 1964) was a Nigerian senator who represented Plateau North Senatorial District in the 9th National Assembly. He is an indigene of Plateau state.

== Background ==
Gyang attended Government Secondary School, Riyom where he obtained his West African School Certificate (WASC) in 1981. He furthered his education at the Ahmadu Bello University, Zaria where he was awarded a bachelor's degree in International Studies in 1986. He also attended the University of Jos finishing with a second degree in law in 2004. He was called to the Nigerian bar in 2007.

== Political career ==
In 2015, Gyang contested for a seat in the House of Representatives for the Barkin Ladi/Riyom constituency. He was declared winner under the banner of the PDP (Peoples Democratic Party). In 2019, he contested for a seat in the Senate under the Peoples Democratic Party (PDP) representing Plateau North senatorial district and he currently serves as a senator in the 9th National Assembly.

During the 2022 Armed Forces Remembrance Day, Gyang has saluted fallen heroes and serving gallants on Armed forces of Nigeria.
