= Hezekiah Dimka =

Nigerian politician (born 1952)

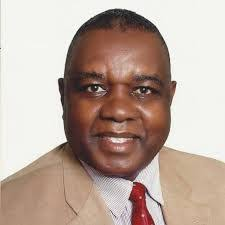

Senator for Plateau Central
- In office 11 June 2019 – 11 June 2023
- Preceded by: Joshua Dariye
- Succeeded by: Diket Plang

Personal details
- Born: Hezekiah Ayuba Dimka; March 1952 (age 74)
- Party: All Progressive Congress
- Occupation: Politician

Hezekiah Ayuba Dimka (born March 1952) is a Nigerian politician who served as the senator representing the Plateau Central senatorial district from 2019 to 2023. He previously served as a board member TETFUND, North Central Nigeria in the year 2018, and was the chairman of the Senate drugs and narcotics committee from 2019 to 2023.

== Early life and education ==
Hezekiah Ayuba Dimka was born in March 1952 in Kabwir, Kanke Local Government Area, Plateau State, Nigeria. He attended the Nigerian Police College and later joined the Nigeria Police Force. He rose to the rank of Commissioner of Police.

== Police career ==
Dimka served in the Nigeria Police Force and worked in different parts of the country, including Imo State and Delta State. He retired from the police in 2008 as a Commissioner of Police.

== Political career ==
In 2018, Dimka was appointed to the board of the Tertiary Education Trust Fund (TETFund). He contested the 2019 Nigerian Senate election for Plateau Central senatorial district on the platform of the All Progressives Congress (APC). The Independent National Electoral Commission recorded 149,457 votes for Dimka, and he was declared elected. He served as the senator representing Plateau Central from 11 June 2019 to 11 June 2023. During the 9th National Assembly, he chaired the Senate Committee on Drugs and Narcotics.
