= Action Democratic Party (Nigeria) =

Political party in Nigeria

Action Democratic Party (ADP)
- Abbreviation: ADP
- Chairman: Eng. Yabagi Yusuf Sani
- General Secretary: Victor Fingesi
- Founded: June 2017
- Legalized: December 2017
- Headquarters: Plot 3379A/3379B, Mungo Park Close, Off Jesse Jackson/Gimbya Street, Asokoro/Garki Area 11, Abuja.
- Membership: 95,512
- Ideology: Third way
- Colours: Red, Sky-blue and Navy-blue
- Slogan: One Destiny

Website
- https://adp.ng/

Action Democratic Party (ADP) is a political party in Nigeria. It was founded in June 2017 by some politically concerned Nigerians who feel there should be a third force to counter the APC and PDP. The current National Chairman of the party is Eng. Yabagi Yusuf Sani. The party got officially registered and announced by the Independent National Electoral Commission (INEC) as a full-fledged political party in June 2017.
