= Mikang =

- LGA
- Motto(s): land of pride and action
- Interactive map of Mikang
- Location in Nigeria
- Coordinates: 9°00′N 9°35′E
- Country: Nigeria
- State: Plateau State
- Headquarters: Tunkus

Government
  - Local Government Chairman: Dr Bernard Seopding Alkali
  - Long-Tel II (head of mikang traditional council of Chiefs): Barr. Donald D. Untel

Area
  - Total: 739 km^{2} (285 sq mi)

Population (2006 census)
  - Total: 97,411
  - Density: 132/km^{2} (341/sq mi)
- Time zone: UTC+1 (WAT)
- 3-digit postal code prefix: 940
- ISO 3166 code: NG.PL.MI

Mikang is a Local Government Area in Plateau State, Nigeria. Its headquarters are in the town of Tunkus.

It has an area of 739 km^{2} and a population of 97,411 at the 2006 census.

The postal code of the area is 940.

== Climate/Geography ==
Mikang LGA has an average temperature of 29 degrees Celsius or 84 degrees Fahrenheit and a total area of 739 square kilometres or 285 square miles. There are two distinct seasons in the LGA: the rainy and the dry seasons. The total amount of precipitation in the LGA is estimated to be 1,450 mm (57 in) annually.

== Languages ==
West Chadic languages of Mikang LGA:

- Koenoem language
- Tehl language
- Piapung language
- Youm
