= Jos North =

Government area in Nigeria

Jos North Jos Metropolis (Jos and Bukuru Metropolis)
- LGA
- Nickname: J-Town
- Interactive map of Jos North
- Location in Nigeria
- Coordinates: 9°55′N 8°54′E
- Country: Nigeria
- State: Plateau State
- Headquarters: Jos

Government
  - Local government chairman: John kyoro Christopher
  - Ujah Anaguta Jos North (Head of Jos north Traditional Council of chiefs): Johnson Jauro Magaji

Area
  - Total: 291 km^{2} (112 sq mi)

Population (2006 census)
  - Total: 970,000
  - Density: 3,300/km^{2} (8,600/sq mi)
- Time zone: UTC+1 (WAT)
- 3-digit postal code prefix: 930
- ISO 3166 code: NG.PL.JN

Jos North is a local government area in Plateau State, Nigeria. Its headquarters are in the city center of Jos. The postal code of the area is 930.

It has an area of 291 km^{2} and a population of 729,300 at the 2006 census. The ethnic group found in this area includes Anaguta. Jos North is the commercial nerve centre of the state, as it houses the state's branch of Nigeria's Central Bank; the headquarters of many commercial banks are also located here, as well as the currency exchanges along Ahmadu Bello way. All basic and essential services can be found in Jos North from the Jos Main market (terminus) to Kabong or Rukuba Road satellite market; however, due to recent communal clashes, many commercial activities are shifting to Jos South. The Gbong Gwom Jos palace and office is located in an area in Jos North called "Jishe" in Berom language. In 1956, Her Majesty Queen Elizabeth II together with her consort Prince Philip had a stopover during the weekend to rest at Jishe known then as Tudun Wada cottage during her Nigeria tour.Jos North has a significant slum. Jos North is the location of the University of Jos and its teaching hospital at Laminga & the National Commission for Museums and Monuments. The Nigerian Film Institute is also located in Jos-North at British America junction along Murtala Mohammed way. Both the Evangelical Church of West Africa (ECWA) and the Church of Christ in Nations (COCIN) are headquartered in this part of the metropolis.

== Climate ==
The Jos North LGA has an average annual temperature of 28 degrees Celsius or 82.4 degrees Fahrenheit and a total area of 291 square kilometres or 112 square miles. The region experiences two distinct seasons, known as the dry and the wet seasons, with an annual total of 1,750 millimetres (69 in) of precipitation. In Jos North LGA, the average wind speed is 11 kilometres per hour (6.8 mph).
