= Langtang South =

- LGA
- Interactive map of Langtang South
- Location in Nigeria
- Coordinates: 8°38′N 9°48′E
- Country: Nigeria
- State: Plateau State
- Headquarters: Mabudi

Area
  - Total: 838 km^{2} (324 sq mi)
- Elevation: 0 m (0 ft)

Population (2006 census)
  - Total: 106,305
  - Density: 127/km^{2} (329/sq mi)
- Time zone: UTC+1 (WAT)
- 3-digit postal code prefix: 941
- ISO 3166 code: NG.PL.LS

Langtang South is a Local Government Area in Plateau State, Nigeria. Its headquarters are in the town of Mabudi.

It has an area of 838 km^{2} and a population of 106,305 at the 2006 census.

The postal code of the area is 941.

Langtang North and Langtang South are represented in the House of Representatives by Vincent Venman Bulus. Hon Nanfa Nbin was sworn in as the Executive Chairman of Langtang South on 10 October 2024. The Local Government has a Chief Magistrate Court located in Mabudi and 3 Area Courts located in Sabon Gida, Dadin Kowa and Magama.

== Climate/Geography ==
Langtang, which is 0 metres/feet above sea level, has a tropical wet and dry climate, often known as a savanna climate (Classification: Aw). The district experiences an annual temperature of 26.91 °C (80.44 °F), which is -2.55% colder than the average for Nigeria. Approximately 147.33 millimetres (5.8 inches) of precipitation and 172.0 wet days (47.12% of the total) are experienced annually in Langtang.

Langtang experiences a whole year of intense heat waves, partially cloudy dry seasons, and terrible wet season. It rarely drops below 59 °F or rises over 104 °F throughout the year, with average temperatures fluctuating between 64 °F and 100 °F. The average daily maximum temperature during the 2.5-month hot season, which runs from 31 January to 15 April, is above 96 °F. At 99 °F on average for highs and 74 °F on average for lows, March is the hottest month of the year in Langtang.

With an average daily maximum temperature below 86 °F, the chilly season spans 3.8 months, from 24 June to 17 October. With an average low temperature of 71 °F and high temperature of 83 °F, August is the coldest month of the year in Langtang South.

An average of 27 degrees Celsius or 81 degrees Fahrenheit is experienced in Langtang South LGA, which spans an area of 838 square kilometres or 324 square miles. Two separate seasons—the dry and the rainy—are experienced in the area. Langtang North LGA receives an estimated 1,900 millimetres (75 in) of precipitation annually in total.

== See also ==
- Langtang, town
- Langtang North Local Government Area
