= Langtang North =

- LGA and Town
- Interactive map of Langtang North
- Location in Nigeria
- Coordinates: 9°08′N 9°47′E
- Country: Nigeria
- State: Plateau State
- Headquarters: Langtang

Government
  - Local Government Chairman: Nanmwa Kumzhi

Area
  - Total: 1,188 km^{2} (459 sq mi)

Population (2006 census)
  - Total: 140,643
  - Density: 118.4/km^{2} (306.6/sq mi)
- Time zone: UTC+1 (WAT)
- 3-digit postal code prefix: 941
- ISO 3166 code: NG.PL.LN

Langtang North is a Local Government Area in Plateau State, Nigeria. Its headquarters are in the town of Langtang. Its geographical coordinates are 9°08′00″N 9°47′00″E.

It has an area of 1,188 km^{2} and a population of 140,643 at the 2006 census.

The postal code of the area is 941.

== Climate ==
The average yearly temperature of Langtang North LGA is 27 degrees Celsius or 80 degrees Fahrenheit, and it covers an area of 1188 square kilometres or 459 square miles. Two separate seasons—the dry and the rainy—are experienced in the area. Langtang North LGA receives an estimated 1,900 mm (75 in) of precipitation annually in total.

== History ==
In July 2014, "at least 11 persons have been feared killed at Zamadede of Pil-Gani district of Langtang North Local Government Area of Plateau State." House of Representatives member Hon. Beni Lar, who represents Langtang North and South constituency, "described the Zama Dede community as peace loving and hard working farmers," who are good in produce large/quantity of crops. "She wondered why some people would be so cruel to take the lives of innocent citizens, particularly at the time the federal government, through the national conference, was trying to find a lasting solution to clashes between farmers and herdsmen," and "appealed to the people of her constituents to remain law abiding."
