= Kanke, Nigeria =

- LGA
- Interactive map of Kanke, Nigeria
- Country: Nigeria
- State: Plateau State
- Headquarters: Kwal

Area
  - Total: 926 km^{2} (358 sq mi)

Population (2006)
  - Total: 121,424
  - Density: 131/km^{2} (340/sq mi)
- Time zone: UTC+1 (WAT)
- Postal code: 933

Kanke is a Local Government Area in Plateau State, Nigeria. Its headquarters is in the town of Kwal.

It has an area of 926 km^{2} and a population of 121,424 at the 2006 census. The majority of the population are Angas - 95% - with the remaining 5% being Taroh, Borghum, and Siyawa. Nigeria's former president, Yakubu Gowon, is from the Kanke LGA.

The postal code of the area is 933.
