= Jos East =

Jos East Iben Izere Gwash East
- LGA
- Nickname: Iben Izere'
- Interactive map of Jos East
- Location in Nigeria
- Coordinates: 9°55′N 9°06′E
- Local Government: Nigeria
- State: Plateau State
- Headquarters: Angware

Government
  - Local government chairman: Markus Useini Nyam
  - Agwom Izere Jos East (Head of Jos Esat Traditional Council of chiefs): Rev Isaac Wakili

Area
  - Total: 1,020 km^{2} (390 sq mi)

Population (2006 census)
  - Total: 85,602
  - Density: 83.9/km^{2} (217/sq mi)
- Time zone: UTC+1 (WAT)
- 3-digit postal code prefix: 930
- ISO 3166 code: NG.PL.JE

Jos East is a Local Government Area in Plateau State, Nigeria. Its headquarters are in the town of Angware. its predominant tribe is the Afizere, also known as the Jarawa. The Asharwa international dance group is major dance group of the Afizere people, they represent Nigeria in countries like UK, US, South Africa, Kenya, Ukraine

It has an area of 1,020 km^{2} and a population of 85,602 at the 2006 census.

The postal code of the area is 930.

== Climate/Geography ==
Jos East LGA has an average temperature of 28 degrees Celsius or 82.4 degrees Fahrenheit and a total area of 1020 square kilometres or 390 square miles. The region experiences two distinct seasons, known as the dry and the wet seasons, with an annual total of 1,750 millimetres (69 in) of precipitation. In Jos East LGA, the average wind speed is 11 kilometres per hour (6.8 mph; 10 ft/s).
