= Pankshin =

- LGA and town
- Interactive map of Pankshin
- Country: Nigeria
- State: Plateau State

Government
  - Local Government Chairman: Samuel Go'ar
  - Ngolong Ngas (Head of Pankshin and Kanke Traditional Council of chiefs): Nde Jika Golit

Area
  - Total: 1,524 km^{2} (588 sq mi)

Population (2006)
  - Total: 191,685
  - Density: 125.7/km^{2} (326/sq mi)
- Time zone: UTC+1 (WAT)
- Postcode: 933

Pankshin is a town and Local Government Area in Plateau State, Nigeria.

It has an area of 1,524 km^{2} and a population of 191,685 at the 2006 census. However, some of the native inhabitants are widely found in neighboring localities where they migrated over a hundred years in search of better agricultural land: Shendam, Gindiri, Mangu, Bokkos and a number of states such as Bauchi, Taraba and Nasarawa due to the quest for arable agricultural land and family expansion.

Pankshin is popularly known for its trade hub as most of the people are farmers growing a vast range of food crops such as millet, guinea corn, maize, tomatoes, rice, onions, cabbage, carrot and collections of fruits. Pankshin is well known also due to the consumption of dog meat by the natives and the annual Cultural festival of the Ngas nation known as Pusdung. Mondays in Pankshin are specifically for trading – buying and selling, hence the name "Monday market" as traders, merchants and people in the environs and as far as away as Bauchi come to buy and sell.

The postal code of the area is 933.

== Language and tribes ==
Situated amidst people with diverse cultures, Pankshin inhabitants speak a number of languages including Ngas, Mupun, Miship, Fier, Tal, Kadung, Pal and Bijim.They are lovable people with high regard for people irrespective of colour, gender or tribe. Predominantly populated by Ngas and Mupun.Other tribes are the Miship, Fier, Tal, Kadung, Pal, and Bijim. The Hausas, Igbos, Yorubas and the Idomas are scarcely represented.

== Religion ==
Pankshin inhabitants are mostly Christians with few Traditional Religionists, and few Muslims The predominantly populated church is the Roman Catholic church. Other churches include the Church of Christ in nations, Baptist, Evangelical Church Winning All, Anglican church, Deeper Life Bible Church, Foursquare Gospel Church, Assemblies of God, The Redeemed Christian church of God, Living faith, Christ Apostolic Church, Christ Embassy etc.

== Financial institutions ==
There are four banks currently in Pankshin: UBA opposite NCCF family house, Unity bank, Bank of Agriculture and Union bank of Nigeria. With the increase in number of students in the institutions, Pankshin will need more banks.

== Climate ==
In Pankshin, the wet season is muggy and overcast, the dry season is partially cloudy, and it is warm year round. Over the course of the year, the temperature normally swings between 12 °C (54 °F) to 32 °C (90 °F) and is rarely below 9 °C (49 °F) or above 35 °C (95 °F).

=== Temperature ===
With an average daily high temperature above 31 °C (87 °F), the 2.5-month hot season runs from February 5 to April 22. March is the hottest month of the year in Pankshin, with an average high temperature of 32 °C (90 °F) and low temperature of 18 °C (64 °F). With an average daily high temperature below 25 °C (77 °F), the cool season spans 3.5 months, from June 30 to October 14. With an average low temperature of 17 °C (62 °F) and high temperature of 23 °C (74 °F), August is the coldest month of the year in Pankshin.

== Educational institutions ==
Pankshin accommodates two great institutions:

- Federal university of Education, Pankshin.
- College of Health Technology, Pankshin.
