= Kanam, Nigeria =

- LGA
- Interactive map of Kanam, Nigeria
- Country: Nigeria
- State: Plateau State
- Headquarters: Dengi

Area
  - Total: 2,600 km^{2} (1,000 sq mi)

Population (2006)
  - Total: 165,898
  - Density: 64/km^{2} (170/sq mi)
- Time zone: UTC+1 (WAT)
- Postal code: 940

Kanam is a Local Government Area in Plateau State, Nigeria. Its headquarters are in the town of Dengi.

It has an area of 2,600 km^{2} and a population of 165,898 at the 2006 census.

The postal code of the area is 940.

The Boghom language and Jarawa language are spoken in the LGA. Hausa language is spoken as a lingua franca of Northern Nigeria.

== Climate/Geography ==
The overall area of Kanam LGA is 2,600 square kilometres or a thousand square miles, with an average temperature of 28 °C (82 °F). The dry and rainy seasons are the two main seasons of the LGA. Kanam LGA has an average humidity level of 62 percent and an average wind speed of 11 km/h or 6.8 mph.
