= Deputy governor of Plateau State =

Second highest-ranking official in the executive branch of Plateau State in Nigeria

Deputy Governor of Plateau State
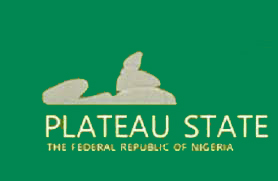
- Flag of Plateau State
- Incumbent; Josephine Piyo since 29 May 2023
- Executive Branch of the Plateau State Government
- Style: Deputy Governor (informal); Her Excellency (courtesy)
- Status: Second highest executive branch officer
- Member of: Plateau State Executive Branch; Plateau State Cabinet
- Seat: Jos
- Nominator: Gubernatorial candidate
- Appointer: Direct popular election or, if vacant, Governor via House of Assembly confirmation
- Term length: Four years renewable once
- Constituting instrument: Constitution of Nigeria
- Inaugural holder: Michael Botmang (Fourth Republic)
- Succession: First
- Website: plateaustate.gov.ng

The deputy governor of Plateau State is the second-highest officer in the executive branch of the government of Plateau State, Nigeria, after the governor of Plateau State, and ranks first in line of succession. The deputy governor is directly elected together with the governor to a four-year term of office.

Josephine Piyo is the current deputy governor, having assumed office on 29 May 2023.

== Qualifications ==
As in the case of the governor, in order to be qualified to be elected as deputy governor, a person must:

- be at least thirty-five (35) years of age;
- be a Nigerian citizen by birth;
- be a member of a political party with endorsement by that political party;
- have School Certificate or its equivalent.

== Responsibilities ==
The deputy governor assists the governor in exercising primary assignments and is also eligible to replace a dead, impeached, absent or ill Governor as required by the 1999 Constitution of Nigeria.

== List of deputy governors ==
| Name | Took office | Left office | Time in office | Party | Elected | Governor |
|---|---|---|---|---|---|---|
| Michael Botmang (1938–2014) | 29 May 1999 | 18 May 2004 | 4 years, 355 days | Peoples Democratic Party | 1999; 2003 | Joshua Dariye |
| Michael Botmang (1938–2014) | 18 November 2004 | 13 November 2006 | 1 year, 360 days | Peoples Democratic Party | | Joshua Dariye |
| Jethro Akun (1945–2021) | 13 November 2006 | 27 April 2007 | 165 days | Peoples Democratic Party | | Michael Botmang |
| Michael Botmang (1938–2014) | 27 April 2007 | 29 May 2007 | 32 days | Peoples Democratic Party | | Joshua Dariye |
| Pauline Tallen (born 1959) | 29 May 2007 | 29 May 2011 | 4 years | Peoples Democratic Party | 2007 | Jonah David Jang |
| Ignatius Datong Longjan (1944–2020) | 29 May 2011 | 29 May 2015 | 4 years | Peoples Democratic Party | 2011 | Jonah David Jang |
| Sonni Gwanle Tyoden (1950–2025) | 29 May 2015 | 29 May 2023 | 8 years | All Progressives Congress | 2015; 2019 | Simon Lalong |
| Josephine Piyo (born 1957) | 29 May 2023 | Incumbent | 3 years, 101 days | Peoples Democratic Party | 2023 | Caleb Mutfwang |

== See also ==
- List of governors of Plateau State
