= 2015 Plateau State gubernatorial election =

2015 gubernatorial election in Plateau State, Nigeria

- (Nigeria)
- April 11, 2015
- Turnout: 0.72%
Nominee	Simon Bako Lalong	Gyang Pwajok
Party	APC	PDP
Running mate	Sonni Gwanle Tyoden	Yilji Gomwalk
Popular vote	564,913	520,627
Percentage	51.83%	47.76%
Governor before election
Jonah David Jang
PDP
Elected Governor
Simon Lalong
APC

The 2015 Plateau State gubernatorial election occurred on April 11, 2015. APC's Simon Lalong won election for a first term, defeating Gyang Pwajok of the PDP and four minor party candidates. Lalong won in 11 LGAs, receiving 51.83% of the vote, while Pwajok won the remaining six of the 17 LGAs of the state, receiving 47.76% of the total votes, trailing behind Lalong with 44,386 votes margin.

Simon Lalong defeated four other aspirants in the APC gubernatorial primary to emerge as the party's candidate. He picked Yilji Gomwalk as his running mate.

Gyang Pwajok was the PDP candidate with Sonni Tyoden as his running mate.

== Electoral system ==
The Governor of Plateau State is elected using the plurality voting system.

== Primary election ==
=== APC primary ===
The APC primary election began at 08:30 pm Thursday 4 December 2014, ending in the early hours of Friday 5 December 2014. Former Speaker, Plateau State House of Assembly, Barr. Simon Lalong, won the primary election polling 2,222 votes against other candidates. Emmanuel Garba polled 304 votes; Solomon Dalung, 293 votes; Elijah Miner, 50 votes; and Vemark Dangin, zero vote. There were 2,964 delegates from across the 17 LGAs of the state.

=== Candidates ===
- Party nominee: Simon Lalong.
- Running mate: Sonni Gwanle Tyoden.
- Emmanuel Garba
- Solomon Dalung
- Elijah Miner
- Vemark Dangin

=== PDP primary ===
The PDP primary election was held on December 8, 2014. (A court earlier restrained the election from taking place on this date.) A total of 818 delegates from across the state were accredited. Incumbent senator representing Plateau North Senatorial District, Gyang Pwajok, emerged the winner after polling as announced, 435 votes. Ignatius Longjan was closest contestant with 163 votes. Sen. Victor Lar, 109 votes; Kemi Nicholas Nshe, 31 votes; Dr. Haruna Dabin polled 16 votes; Bitrus Nabasu, 10 votes; John Clark Dabwan, seven votes; Prof. Sonni Tyoden, seven votes; Chris Bature, five votes; Godfrey Miri, four votes; Arc. John Alkali, three votes; Joseph Golwa, two votes; Fidelis Tapgun, one vote; Nandom Pyenap, one vote; Jimmy Cheto, zero vote; and Prof. Longmas Wapmuk, zero vote. 12 of these 16 aspirants later called for the cancellation of the results.

=== Candidates ===
- Party nominee: Gyang Pwajok.
- Running mate: Sonni Tyoden.
- Ignatius Longjan: Incumbent deputy governor
- Victor Lar
- Kemi Nshe
- Haruna Dabin
- Bitrus Nabasu
- John Clark Dabwan
- Chris Bature
- Godfrey Miri
- John Alkali
- Joseph Golwa
- Fidelis Tapgun
- Nandom Pyenap
- Jimmy Cheto
- Longmas Wapmuk

== Results ==
A total of six candidates registered with the Independent National Electoral Commission to contest in the election. APC candidate Simon Lalong won the election for a first term, defeating PDP Gyang Pwajok and several minor party candidates. Lalong received 51.83% of the votes, while Pwajok received 47.76%. There were 1,508,585 registered voters from across the state.

Candidate	Party	Votes	%
Simon Lalong	All Progressives Congress (APC)	564,913	51.83
Gyang Pwajok	People's Democratic Party (PDP)	520,627	47.76
Bagudu Hirse	Labour Party (LP)	1,770	0.16
Samson Adamu	All Progressives Grand Alliance (APGA)	1,408	0.13
Elizabeth Yirse	Mega Progressive Peoples Party (MPPP)	1,035	0.09
Anuma Agudu	Social Democratic Party (SDP)	260	0.02
Total		1,090,013	100.00
Registered voters/turnout		1,508,585	–
Source: PM NEWS, ProShareNg

=== By local government area ===
Here are the results of the election by local government area for the two major parties. Blue represents LGAs won by Lalong. Green represents LGAs won by Pwajok.

County	Simon Lalong APC		Gyang Pwajok PDP		Total votes
County	#	%	#	%	#
Barkin-Ladi	13,151		56,933		
Bassa	28,770		34,341		
Bokkos	35,689		16,111		
Jos East	15,356		7,752		
Jos North	117,443		61,391		
Jos South	31,760		93,962		
Kanam	41,512		30,466		
Kanke	18,458		23,118		
Langtang North	25,202		23,045		
Langtang South	13,663		19,061		
Mangu	74,981		28,509		
Mikang	12,512		11,522		
Pankshin	33,364		23,493		
Qua'an Pan	27,472		19,965		
Riyom	7,253		37,793		
Shendam	40,464		14,476		
Wase	27,844		18,634		
Totals	564,913		520,627		1,085,540
