= 2003 Plateau State gubernatorial election =

2003 gubernatorial election in Plateau State, Nigeria

- (Nigeria)
- April 19, 2003
| Nominee | Joshua Dariye | Jonah David Jang |
| Party | PDP | ANPP |
| Running mate | Michael Botmang |
| Popular vote | 364,903 |
Governor before election
Joshua Dariye
PDP
Elected Governor
Joshua Dariye
PDP

The 2003 Plateau State gubernatorial election occurred on April 19, 2003. Incumbent Governor PDP's Joshua Dariye won election for a second term, defeating ANPP's Jonah David Jang and AD's Damishi Sango.

Joshua Dariye emerged winner in the PDP gubernatorial primary election. His running mate was Michael Botmang.

== Electoral system ==
The Governor of Plateau State is elected using the plurality voting system.

== Results ==
A total of three candidates registered with the Independent National Electoral Commission to contest in the election. PDP Governor Joshua Dariye won re-election for a second term, defeating ANPP's Jonah David Jang and AD's Damishi Sango.

The total number of registered voters in the state was 1,391,594. However, only 76.66% (i.e. 1,066,795) of registered voters participated in the excerise.

| Candidate | Party | Votes | % |
|---|---|---|---|
| Joshua Dariye | People's Democratic Party (PDP) | 364,903 | 100.00 |
| Jonah David Jang | All Nigeria Peoples Party (ANPP) | | |
| Damishi Sango | Alliance for Democracy (AD) | | |
| Total | | 364,903 | 100.00 |
| Registered voters/turnout | | 1,391,594 | – |
Source: Gamji, Africa Update
