= 2015 Nigerian Senate elections in Plateau State =

2015 Nigerian Senate election in Plateau State

The 2015 Nigerian Senate election in Plateau State was held on March 28, 2015, to elect members of the Nigerian Senate to represent Plateau State. Jeremiah Useni representing Plateau South, Joshua Dariye representing Plateau Central and Jonah David Jang representing Plateau North all won on the platform of Peoples Democratic Party.

== Overview ==
Affiliation	Party		Total
Affiliation	PDP	APC	Total
Before Election			3
After Election	3	–	3

== Summary ==
District	Incumbent	Party	Elected Senator	Party
Plateau South			Jeremiah Useni	PDP
Plateau Central			Joshua Dariye	PDP
Plateau North			Jonah David Jang	PDP

== Results ==
=== Plateau South ===
Peoples Democratic Party candidate Jeremiah Useni won the election, defeating All Progressives Congress candidate John Nanzip Shagaya and other party candidates.

2015 Nigerian Senate election in Plateau State
Party	Candidate	Votes	%
PDP	Jeremiah Useni		
APC	John Nanzip Shagaya		
Total votes			
PDP hold			

=== Plateau Central ===
Peoples Democratic Party candidate Joshua Dariye won the election, defeating All Progressives Congress candidate Satzilang Pilit and other party candidates.

2015 Nigerian Senate election in Plateau State
Party	Candidate	Votes	%
PDP	Joshua Dariye		
APC	Satzilang Pilit		
Total votes			
PDP hold			

=== Plateau North ===
Peoples Democratic Party candidate Jonah David Jang won the election, defeating All Progressives Congress candidate Eunice Ayisa and other party candidates.

2015 Nigerian Senate election in Plateau State
Party	Candidate	Votes	%
PDP	Jonah David Jang		
APC	Eunice Ayisa		
Total votes			
PDP hold			
