= Nannim Langyi =

Nigerian politician

Nannim Joseph Langyi

Member of the Plateau State House of Assembly
- Constituency: Langtang North Constituency

Personal details
- Born: Plateau State, Nigeria
- Occupation: Politician

Nannim Joseph Langyi is a Nigerian politician. He currently serves as the State Representatives representing Langtang North constituency at the 10th Plateau State House of Assembly.
