= 2007 Plateau State gubernatorial election =

State election in Nigeria

- April 14, 2007
Nominee	Jonah David Jang	Pam Dung Gyang
Party	PDP	ACN
Popular vote	465,364	269,273
Governor before election
Joshua Dariye
PDP
Elected Governor
Jonah David Jang
PDP

The 2007 Plateau State gubernatorial election was the 6th gubernatorial election of Plateau State. Held on April 14, 2007, the People's Democratic Party nominee Jonah David Jang won the election, defeating Pam Dung Gyang of the Action Congress of Nigeria.

== Results ==
Jonah David Jang from the People's Democratic Party won the election, defeating Pam Dung Gyang from the Action Congress of Nigeria. Registered voters was 1,602,550.

2007 Plateau State gubernatorial election
Party	Candidate	Votes	%	±%
PDP	Jonah David Jang	465,364	0	
ACN	Pam Dung Gyang	269,273	0	
PDP hold				
