= Josephine Piyo =

Nigerian politician (born 1957)

Her Excellency Josephine Piyo

Deputy Governor of Plateau State
- Incumbent
- Assumed office 29 May 2023
- Governor: Caleb Mutfwang
- Preceded by: Sonni Gwanle Tyoden

Personal details
- Born: 13 September 1957 (age 69)
- Party: All Progressive Congress
- Occupation: Politician

Josephine Chundung Piyo (born 13 September 1957) is a Nigerian politician who has served as deputy governor of Plateau State since 2023. She previously served as a member of the Plateau State House of Assembly.

== Background ==
Josephine Chundung was born in 1957. She is from Plateau State, Barkin Ladi.

== Career ==
Piyo has worked as a nurse and teacher before entering politics. In 1999, she was elected to the Plateau State House of Assembly. Josephine then took the role of special advisor to the governor of Plateau State from 2008 to 2011. Then in 2018, she became the Chairman of Riyom, a local government area of Plateau State. She is an advocate for the female voice and always emphasizes on the importance of female
