= Shedrack Best =

Nigerian academic and politician

Professor Shedrack Gaya Best
- Citizenship: Nigerian
- Education: B.Sc; Masters in Political Science and a Ph.D in Peace and Conflict Studies
- Alma mater: Ahmadu Bello University, Zaria; University of Jos and University of Bradford, United Kingdom.
- Occupation: Academic
- Employer: Plateau State Government
- Known for: Academic and politics
- Notable work: Religion and Party Politics in Northern Nigeria up to 1966; Violent Conflict and its Aftermath in Jos and Kano, Nigeria: What is the Role of Religion?; Conflict and Peace Building in Plateau State.(2007).
- Predecessor: Prof. Bernard Matur
- Political party: Peoples Democratic Party (PDP)

Shedrack Best is a Nigerian professor of International Relations and Peace Building and the vice chancellor of the Plateau state University, Bokkos. He was appointed into office on 8 February 2024.

== Early life and education ==
Best was a First Class graduate of International Studies from the Ahmadu Bello University, Zaria with B.Sc. He has Masters in Political Science from the University of Jos and a Ph.D. in Peace and Conflict Studies from the University of Bradford, United Kingdom.

== Career ==
Best was appointed as the new Vice Chancellor of Plateau state University located at the Bokkos Local Government Area, by Plateau State Governor, Caleb Mutfwang, His appointment came almost immediately the former Vice Chacellor, Prof. Bernard Matur and four other heads of the state-owned tertiary institutions were dismissed by the Governor. He was the Director of Centre for Conflict Resolution and Peace Studies of University of Jos.

Delivering an speech on the books donated by Book Aid International, the VC stated, "the materials, which span various disciplines and were shipped to the University at no cost, would greatly contribute to knowledge sharing and academic development within the University community, We are thankful for this kind gesture and will ensure that the University Library remains secure and functional." The VC was at the 4th public lecture in commemoration of the 10th anniversary of the Western Delta University in Oghara, Delta State. While making a speech on "Private Universities and the Challenge of Educational Development In Nigeria,' where he stated "the owners of such institutions were building the future of Nigeria; hence they should be commended and celebrated, while the government must show its interest and support."

Best paid a courtesy visit with his management Team to the Commissioner for Local Government and Chieftaincy Affairs, Hon. Euphriam Usman, in his office in Plateau state. He stated the challenges of the university which included: borehole for water supply, lack of developed staff housing, lack of on-campus students' housing as 95% of the students live off-campus and are exposed to danger and transport services. He also stated that "17 local governments of the state are co-owners of the university." He delivered a Keynote Speech keynote speech at the annual national conference of Directors and Chief Road Traffic Officers (VIOs) of the Federation in Jos on October 27, 2025. He urged them to use technology and modern systems to improve road safety and national security.

=== Career as a politician ===
Best was formerly the secretary to the State Governor, when Governor Jonah Kang was ruling Plateau State. As Plateau state is one of the core states that benefited from over N100 billion by the New Nigeria Development Company (NNDC), Prof Shedrack Best received the dividend of the N40 million on behalf of the government. He enjoined the youth of the state to "take advantage of the development and seek the opportunity to get employment."

Later, he declared his interest in contesting the 2019 Governorship of Plateau State under the platform of the Peoples Democratic Party (PDP). It was said that he "completed a tour of Plateau Southern Senatorial Zone met party Executives and critical stakeholders to intimate them of his intention to contest for the Governorship of the state, and to seek their support during the Party's Primary Elections coming up shortly in the month of May 2022." He became a PDP gubernatorial aspirant for Governor of Plateau State.

== Publications ==
Violent Conflict and its Aftermath in Jos and Kano, Nigeria: What is the Role of Religion? By Shedrack G Best (2011), Religions and Development Working Paper 69. This document is an output from a project funded by UK Aid from the UK Department for International Development (DFID) for the benefit of developing countries.

Religion and Party Politics in Northern Nigeria up to 1966. By Shedrack G Best (2011). Benin Journal of Historical Studies, 3 (1–2), 50–74.

Conflict and Peace Building in Plateau State. By Shedrack Gaya Best (2007). Spectrum Books Limited, 277pages. ISBN 9780298037, 9789780298036.
