= Nora Daduut =

Nigerian academic and politician (born 1953)

Sen. Nora Daduut

Senator for Plateau South
- In office 5 December 2020 – 11 June 2023
- Preceded by: Ignatius Datong Longjan
- Succeeded by: Napoleon Bali

Personal details
- Born: 10 May 1953 (age 73) Jos, Northern Region, British Nigeria (now in Plateau State, Nigeria)
- Party: All Progressives Congress
- Occupation: Politician, professor, academic

Nora Ladi Daduut (Note: Also spelled Dadu'ut.) (born 10 May 1953) is a Nigerian academic and politician who served as the senator representing the Plateau South senatorial district from 2020 to 2023.

She was elevated to the position of professor in 2018 by the University of Jos. She is the first female senator from Plateau State.

== Career ==
Daduut is a professor of French and resigned as the head of the department of French at the University of Jos, Plateau State.

== Political career ==
In the 2020 Plateau South Senatorial District bye election, she represented the All Progressives Congress at the election where she polled 83,151 votes, while her closest rival at the polls Hon. George Daika, representing the Peoples Democratic Party (PDP), polled 70,838 votes. She was sworn into the senate on 15 December 2020.
