= 1991 Plateau State gubernatorial election =

1991 gubernatorial election in Plateau State, Nigeria

Plateau gubernatorial election
- December 14, 1991
| Nominee | Fidelis Tapgun |
| Party | SDP |
Elected Governor
Fidelis Tapgun
SDP

The 1991 Plateau State gubernatorial election occurred on December 14, 1991. SDP candidate Fidelis Tapgun won the election.

== Conduct ==
The gubernatorial election was conducted using an open ballot system. Primaries for the two parties to select their flag bearers were conducted on October 19, 1991.

The election occurred on December 14, 1991. SDP candidate Fidelis Tapgun won the election.
