= 1999 Plateau State gubernatorial election =

1999 gubernatorial election in Plateau State, Nigeria

- January 9, 1999
Nominee	Joshua Dariye
Party	PDP	All People's Party (Nigeria)
Popular vote	484,280	200,016
Governor before election
Fidelis Tapgun
SDP
Elected Governor
Joshua Dariye
PDP

The 1999 Plateau State gubernatorial election occurred in Nigeria on January 9, 1999. The PDP nominee Joshua Dariye won the election, defeating the APP candidate.

Joshua Dariye emerged PDP candidate.

== Electoral system ==
The Governor of Plateau State is elected using the plurality voting system.

== Primary election ==
=== PDP primary ===
The PDP primary election was won by Joshua Dariye.

== Results ==
The total number of registered voters in the state was 1,313,603. Total number of votes cast was 753,717, while number of valid votes was 734,741. Rejected votes were 18,976.

Candidate	Party	Votes	%
Joshua Dariye	People's Democratic Party	484,280	70.77
All People's Party	200,016	29.23	
Total		684,296	100.00
Valid votes		684,296	97.30
Invalid/blank votes		18,976	2.70
Total votes		703,272	100.00
Registered voters/turnout		1,313,603	53.54
Source: Nigeria World, IFES, Semantics Scholar
