= Abok Izam =

Nigerian politician

Speaker of the Plateau State House of Assembly
- In office 10 June 2019 – 28 October 2021
- Preceded by: Joshua Madaki
- Succeeded by: Yakubu Yakson Sanda

Member of the Plateau State House of Assembly
- Incumbent
- Assumed office 2019
- Constituency: Jos East

Personal details
- Party: All Progressives Congress (APC)
- Occupation: Politician

Abok Izam is a Nigerian politician. He was the lawmaker representing Jos East constituency and former Speaker of the Plateau State House of Assembly under the platform of the All Progressives Congress (APC) political party.

== Early life and education ==
Izam was born in Jos East Local Government Area of Plateau State, Nigeria. He attended schools in Plateau State before studying law at the University of Jos. While serving in the Plateau State House of Assembly, he continued his legal studies at the university.

== Political career ==
Izam is a Nigerian politician and a member of the All Progressives Congress (APC). He was elected to represent the Jos East constituency in the Plateau State House of Assembly in the 2019 general election. On 10 June 2019, he was elected Speaker of the 9th Plateau State House of Assembly. During his time as Speaker, Izam led the sittings of the Plateau State House of Assembly. On 28 October 2021, members of the Assembly removed him from office.
