= Yakubu Yackson Sanda =

Nigerian politician (born 1965)

Yakubu Yakson Sanda
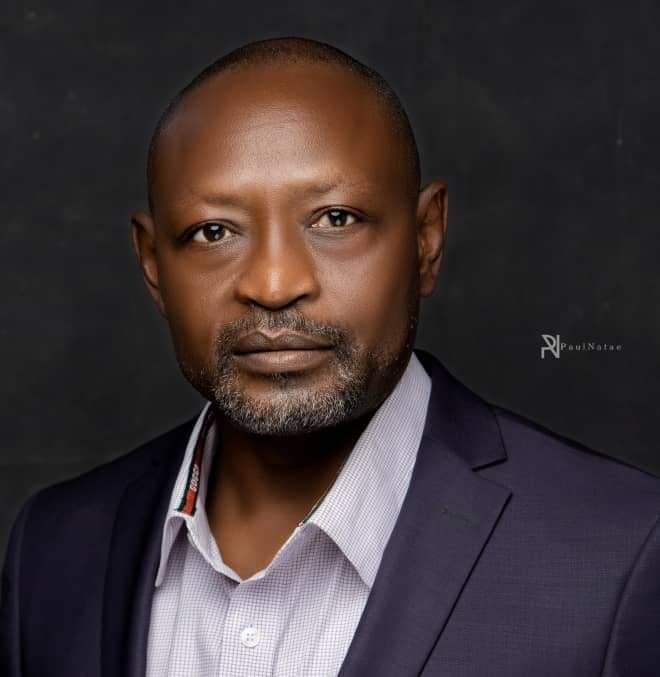

Speaker of the Plateau State House of Assembly
- Incumbent
- Assumed office 28 October 2021
- Governor: Simon Lalong
- Deputy: Saleh Shehu Yipmong
- Preceded by: Abok Ayuba
- Constituency: Pengana

Personal details
- Born: 28 February 1965 (age 61)
- Party: All Progressives Congress (APC)

Yakubu Yakson Sanda (born 1965) is a Nigerian politician from Bicizà Buji District of Pengana Chiefdom, Bassa Local Government Area, who was elected speaker of the 9th Plateau State House of Assembly in 2021. Sanda is a first-time member of the Assembly elected from Pengana Constituency on the platform of All Progressives Congress in 2019. He was elected by members of the house as speaker after the impeachment of Rt. Hon. Abok Nuhu Ayuba .

== Education and early career ==
Yakubu Yackson Sanda attended and obtained his First Leaving School Certificate at UNA Primary School in Jos, after which he completed his Secondary School education at Metropolitan College, Jos.

He studied economics at the University of Jos in Plateau State. He then worked with the Plateau State Sports Council as an accountant. Yakubu Sanda rose through the ranks to become a Director of Finance and Supply in the Plateau State Civil Service in the Plateau State Ministry of Sport.

He previously worked as an accountant at Plateau HighLand Football Club and the Team Manager of Plateau United FC.

== Politics ==
He started his political career when he was elected to lead the Buji Youth Development Association as its National President.

After which he contested in the 2003, 2007, 2011 Plateau State House of Assembly elections to represent Pengana constituency, which he lost.

He was finally elected to the House of Assembly in the 2019 election, and was elected as Speaker after the former Speaker was impeached.

== Personal life ==
Yakubu Yakson Sanda is a Christian. He is married to Nancy Yakubu Sanda and they have three children.
