= Lawrence Onoja =

Nigerian politician and general

Major General Lawrence Anebi Onoja

Governor of Plateau State
- In office 1986 – July 1988
- Preceded by: Chris Alli
- Succeeded by: Aliyu Kama

Governor of Katsina State
- In office July 1988 – December 1989
- Preceded by: Abdullahi Sarki Mukhtar
- Succeeded by: John Jahaya Madaki

Personal details
- Born: 10 August 1948 (age 77) Ohimini LGA, Benue State, Colonial Nigeria

Military service
- Allegiance: Nigeria
- Branch/service: Nigerian Army
- Rank: Major General

Lawrence Anebi Onoja (born 10 August 1948) was the military governor of Plateau State, Nigeria from 1986 to July 1988 and then of Katsina State until December 1989 during the military regime of General Ibrahim Babangida. He later became Principal Staff Officer to General Sani Abacha, before being arrested for alleged involvement in a coup attempt. He retired from the army in 1998, and after the return to democracy in May 1999 with the Nigerian Fourth Republic entered into politics.

== Background ==
Onoja was born on 10 August 1948 at Idekpa Okpiko, Ohimini local government in Benue State of Idoma origins. He attended St. Francis College, Otukpo and then Government College in Lafia, Nasarawa State (1962–1966). He joined the army in 1966 as a cadet officer.

Onoja attended the Nigerian Defence Academy, Kaduna and the Mons Officer Cadet School, Aldershot, England. Onoja was commissioned into the Nigerian Army in October 1968. While in the army, Onoja attended Cameron University, Oklahoma and Oklahoma State University, earning a degree in political science. He later obtained an M.Sc. in political science from the University of Jos, and a PhD in International Law and Diplomacy from the University of Jos.

Onoja held various appointments including Defence Adviser at the Nigerian Embassy in Cairo, Egypt. Onoja was Principal Staff Officer to General Ibrahim Babangida before being appointed military governor of Plateau State in July 1988.

== Military Governor ==
As Plateau State governor, in an effort to defuse tension between Christians and Moslems, Onoja (a Christian) announced that all public places of worship would be destroyed. In April 1988 he was forced to shut down the University of Jos following student disturbances.

As military governor in Katsina State Onoja was noted for his honesty. In March 1989 he announced that a US$20 million loan from Saudi Arabia was being negotiated for the Zobe Dam agricultural irrigation project.

== Later career ==
After leaving office as governor of Katsina, Onoja was appointed director of the Faculty of Joint Studies in the Command and Staff College, Jaji, and then in 1991 became principal officer to the Chief of Defence Staff and Minister of Defence. He was then appointed General Officer Commanding 3rd Armoured Division of the Nigerian Army, Jos, and General Staff Officer in the Presidency of General Sani Abacha. In 1998 he was arrested for allegedly being involved in a plot to depose Abacha, but was set free when no charges were brought against him.

Onoja retired from the army in 1998 as a Major General. In 2003 he was a board member of the Federal Airports Authority of Nigeria. Onoja was a Governorship aspirant in the 2003 Benue State elections on the United Nigeria Peoples Party (UNPP) platform. He competed against incumbent David Mark in the People's Democratic Party (PDP) primaries to be candidate for Senator in Benue South in December 2006. In the bitter fight, Onoja went as far as signing an advertorial in a national newspaper that support former Benue governor George Akume. The contest was close, with Mark gaining 1,719 votes and Onoja 1,605. Although Mark did not gain the 2/3 majority required by the PDP, Onoja accepted the result.

In April 2009, President Umaru Yar'Adua named Onoja as Chairman of the National Institute for Sports. In 2009, the Idekpa Community of Ohimini local government area in Benue State honored Onoja with the chieftaincy title of Ooyame K’Idekpa, or "Achiever Par Excellence". They also urged him to run for Senate in 2011.

== Bibliography ==
- Lawrence Anebi Onoja (1996). Peace-keeping and international security in a changing world. Mono Expressions. ISBN 978-32052-5-0.

== See also ==
- List of governors of Plateau State
