= 2011 Plateau State gubernatorial election =

State election in Nigeria

- April 26, 2011
Nominee	Jonah David Jang	Pauline Tallen
Party	PDP	LP
Popular vote	823,536	494,975
Governor before election
Jonah David Jang
PDP
Elected Governor
Jonah David Jang
PDP

The 2011 Plateau State gubernatorial election was the 7th gubernatorial election of Plateau State. Held on April 26, 2011, the People's Democratic Party nominee Jonah David Jang won the election, defeating Pauline Tallen of the Labour Party.

== Results ==
A total of 9 candidates contested in the election. Jonah David Jang from the People's Democratic Party won the election, defeating Pauline Tallen from the Labour Party. Valid votes was 1,399,418.

2011 Plateau State gubernatorial election
Party	Candidate	Votes	%	±%
PDP	Jonah David Jang	823,536		
LP	Pauline Tallen	494,975		
PDP hold				
