= Eric Piangat Dakogol =

Nigerian politician

Member plateau State house of assembly
- Constituency: Qua’an Pan North

Personal details
- Died: November 2022
- Occupation: Politician

Eric Piangat Dakogol was a Nigerian politician. Born on 3 November 1967. He was a two time member of the Plateau State House of Assembly representing Qua’an Pan North State Constituency in the Assembly from 2015 to 2022 . He died in November 2022 after a brief illness.
