= Government of Plateau State =

Overview of the government of Nigeria's state of Plateau

Plateau State Government is the government of Plateau State, concerned with the administration of the state ministries.

The government consists of the executive, legislative and Plateau State Judiciary.

The government is headed by the Plateau State Governor who is the policy-maker and often assisted by the commissioners and other civil servants of the state.

== Office of the Governor ==
The Office of the Governor was created along with the creation of the state in 1976. It is currently headed by Caleb Manasseh Mutfwang. This office is responsible for the effective coordination of all government activities for the good of the people of the State.

== Judiciary ==
The Judiciary is one of the three co-equal arms of the Plateau State Government. It is concerned with the interpretation of the laws of Plateau State government.

It is currently headed by Justice Peter Mann.

== Legislature ==
The legislature or state house assembly is one of the three co-equal arms of the State Government concerned with lawmaking. The legislature consists of elected members from each constituency of the state. The head of the legislature, Plateau State House of Assembly is the Speaker, Yakubu Yakson Sanda who is elected by the house.

== Executive ==
The executive branch is one of the three co-equal arms of the State Government, concerned with policy making and implementation of bills. Members of the executive include the Governor, Deputy governor, and commissioners. There are also other top officials of the state, such as the head of service. The executives overseas the ministries. Each ministry is headed and coordinated by a commissioner, assisted by a permanent secretary.
