= Samuel Atukum =

Nigerian politician and navy officer

Rear Admiral Samuel Bitrus Atukum

Governor of Plateau State
- In office January 1984 – August 1985
- Preceded by: Solomon Lar
- Succeeded by: Chris Alli

Personal details
- Born: 1940 (age 85–86) Plateau

Military service
- Branch/service: Nigerian Navy
- Rank: Rear Admiral

Samuel Bitrus Atukum (born 1940) was the military governor of Plateau State, Nigeria from January 1984 to August 1985 during the military regime of General Muhammadu Buhari.

== Plateau State Governor ==
As governor, Navy Captain Atukum had to handle many challenges with a severely limited budget. He reintroduced community and cattle tax. In July 1984, while launching a statewide tree-planting program, he noted that 70,000 hectares of valuable farmland had been lost to mining activities, and called for Federal assistance in conservation and reclamation of eroded land. He sold off all Mercedes-Benz and Peugeot 505 official cars, replacing them with Peugeot 504s, and also banned after-hours use of government cars. In August 1985 he proposed that the unions should accept a 20% cut in the salary of state civil servants in view of the state's financial difficulties.

Atukum said politics "has adversely affected the lives of the citizens instead of being an instrument for institutional development". He expressed concern over use of the terms "non-indigenes" and "indigenes", which he felt would cause disharmony among people in the state. In 1985 he declared that anybody who harboured illegal immigrants after the 10 May departure deadline would be treated as a saboteur. In December 1984 he launched a program to vaccinate all children against killer diseases, urging parents to take advantage. He merged Plateau Television (PTV) and Plateau Broadcasting Corporation (PBC) into the Plateau Radio Television Corporation.

== Later career ==
After retirement, Atukum was appointed the chief executive of the Nigerian Unity Line (NUL), a new state-owned company established after the liquidation of the Nigerian National Shipping Line in 1995. The company was privatised in 2001. In February 2002 the company's only vessel, MV Abuja, was stuck in Sri Lanka needing repairs, while the shipyard was insisting on a down payment for the work and the crew's salaries were unpaid. The ship was finally released in February 2003 after a bank guarantee of US$500,000 had been provided. A few weeks later, NUL put the 10,000 deadweight container ship up for sale and plans to float the company on the stock market were dropped.
