= Ignatius Datong Longjan =

Nigerian diplomat and politician (1944–2020)

Senator for Plateau South
- In office 11 June 2019 – 10 February 2020
- Preceded by: Jeremiah Useni
- Succeeded by: Nora Daduut

Deputy Governor of Plateau State
- In office 29 May 2011 – 29 May 2015
- Governor: Jonah David Jang
- Preceded by: Pauline Tallen
- Succeeded by: Sonni Gwanle Tyoden

Chief of Staff to the Governor of Plateau State
- In office 29 May 2007 – 29 May 2011
- Governor: Jonah David Jang
- Succeeded by: Gyang Pwajok

Personal details
- Born: 19 May 1944
- Died: 10 February 2020 (aged 75) Abuja, Nigeria
- Party: All Progressives Congress
- Occupation: Diplomat; politician

Ignatius Datong Longjan (19 May 1944 – 10 February 2020) was a Nigerian diplomat and politician who served as the senator representing the Plateau South senatorial district from 2019 until his death in 2020. He previously served as the deputy governor of Plateau State from 2011 to 2015.

== Early life and education ==
Longjan was born in Kwa, Quanpaan Local government area of the present day Plateau State. He attended the Kwa Junior/Senior Primary School and St. Joseph's College, Vom. He then attended the Ahmadu Bello University Zaria for his university education, where he obtained a Diploma in Law, and also attended the City University of New York, where he obtained a bachelor's degree in public administration.

== Diplomatic career ==
Most of his working life was spent in the Nigerian foreign service in Nigerian missions abroad including Hamburg in Germany, The Hague in Holland, Conakry in Guinea, New York in the USA and Moscow in Russia.

== Political career ==
Longjan was the chief of staff to the Plateau State governor between 2007 and 2011. He subsequently became the deputy governor of the state between 2011 and 2015. In 2019, he contested the election to represent the Plateau Southern senatorial seat in the Nigerian National Assembly. At his party's primary selection, he scored 972 votes to beat the other contestants for the party's ticket. In the 25 February 2019 general election, he polled 140,918 votes to win the election.

== Death ==
On 10 February 2020, Longjan died at a hospital in Abuja, Nigeria.
