= Abok Ayuba =

Speaker of the Plateau State House of Assembly, Nigeria

Speaker of the Plateau State House of Assembly
- In office 10 June 2019 – October 28, 2021
- Governor: Simon Lalong
- Deputy: Saleh Shehu Yipmong
- Preceded by: Joshua Madaki
- Succeeded by: Yakubu Yakson Sanda
- Constituency: Jos East

Personal details
- Born: 1986 (age 39–40)
- Party: All Progressives Congress (APC)

Abok Ayuba (born 1986) is a Nigerian politician who was elected speaker of the 9th Plateau State House of Assembly in 2019.

Ayuba was a first-time member of the Assembly elected from Jos East Constituency on the platform of All Progressives Congress in 2019. He was a 500 level law student at the University of Jos when he was elected. He was controversially impeached by members of the house of Assembly on the 28 October 2021.

His election as the speaker of the house at the age of 33 was hailed nationwide as the representative of the youth. Ayuba was nominated for the speakership election by Ibrahim Baba Hassan (a former Deputy Speaker of the House) from Jos North and was seconded by a first-time member of the house, Esther Dusu representing Jos Northwest. A ranking member of the assembly who had been in the house since 1999 was widely rumoured to emerge speaker but members of the house unanimously waved all speakership electoral requirements to allow the election of Ayuba.
