= Ochapa Onazi =

Nigerian academic (1936–2024)

Ochapa C. Onazi (20 November 1936 – 1 August 2024) was a Professor of Agricultural Education and former Vice-Chancellor of the University of Jos, Nigeria. Ochapa Onazi was educated at the Boys’ Secondary School, Gindiri, and the Nigerian College of Arts, Science and Technology, Zaria. He graduated with a Bachelor of Science (BSc) and Master of Science (MSc) from the University of London and a Diploma from Imperial College (DIC) London. Ochapa Onazi graduated with a Doctor of Philosophy (Ph.D.) in Agricultural Education from Kansas State University, United States of America (USA), where he was supervised by Professor Robert Johnson.

Ochapa Onazi was a Member of the Entomological Society of Nigeria; Trustee of the Agricultural Extension Association of Nigeria; Member of the Agricultural Society of Nigeria; Life Member and Past President of the Nigeria Association for Agricultural Education; former Member of the Kansas Entomological Society; former Fellow of the Royal Entomological Society; and former Member of the Adult Education Association, USA.

In 2003, Ochapa Onazi was a recipient of the National Honour of Officer of the Order of Niger (OON) in recognition of services to Nigeria's educational sector. In 2014, he was a recipient of the National Universities Distinguished Professor Award, also in recognition of his services to education in Nigeria and for scholarship in the field of biological sciences. He was president of the Gindiri Old Students Association.

Ochapa Onazi died on 1 August 2024, at the age of 87. He is survived by his wife, Ruth Mikiya and children: Eru, Oche, Agbenu and Adadu. His beloved daughter, Ori, died in 2019.

== Academia ==
Ochapa Onazi was former Vice-Chancellor of the University of Jos (1985–1989), former Pro-Chancellor and Chairman of the Governing Council of Bayero University, Kano (2000–2004), former Pro-Chancellor and Chairman of the Governing Council of Benue State University, Makurdi (1996–2004) and former Pro-Chancellor and Chairman of the Governing Council of Plateau State University, Bokkos (2006–2007). Until his death, he was the Pro-Chancellor and Chairman of the Governing Council of the Karl Kumm University, Vom.

Professor Onazi was a recipient of several fellowships, including the FAO/UNDP Desert Locust Project, Tehran (1966), the FAO/UNDP Desert Locust Project, London, Morocco and Senegal (1966), the UK Technical Assistance Fellowship for the M.Sc. programme at Imperial College, London (1966–1967), the USAID Fellowship from Kansas State University for the Ph.D. Programme (1971–1973) and the British Council Visitorship to various agricultural institutions in the UK (1975 and 1984). Ochapa Onazi was also the General Editor of the 'Macmillan Intermediate Agriculture Series', London and Basingstoke: Macmillan Publishers Limited and Co-Editor (with Anthony Youdeowei and Fred Ezedinma) of the Introduction to Tropical Agriculture, London: Longman Publishing Group, 1986.

== Career ==
Ochapa Onazi was a foundational member of staff of the National Agricultural Extension Research Liaison Services (NAERLS), Ahmadu Bello University, Zaria. With late Alhaji Imrana Yazidu, Professor Ango Abdullahi and others, they established the Extension Research Liaison Services (ERLS), which later metamorphosed into the NAERLS. After serving as an extension entomologist at the NAERLS, Onazi became the Deputy Director and substantive Director of the Division of Agricultural Colleges (DAC) in 1973 and 1974 respectively. He held that position for ten years until his appointment as the Provost of the Makurdi Campus of the University of Jos in Benue State following the merger of the defunct Federal University of Technology, Makurdi in 1984 with the University of Jos by the Federal Government. In a career that spans over 40 years, Onazi carried out several important national and international assignments. He was Member of the Board of National Electric Power Authority (1976–1980); Co-ordinator of Memorandum of Understanding with Kansas State University on the graduate training of mature students from the Ministries of Agriculture in the Northern States of Nigeria (1973–1984); Chairman of the Task Force on the Establishment of Vocational Training Centres in Benue State (1978–1980); Editorial Advisor to Popular Technology Magazine, Published by WENCA Co. Ltd., London; Chairman of the World Bank Agricultural Education Project, Federal Ministry of Education, Lagos (1986–1988); Leader of the Presidential Monitoring Team on Final Comprehensive Inspection (FCI) of Landing Jetties constructed by DFRRI in Rivers State (July–August 1990), FAO Consultant in Agricultural Extension Training, Republic of Uganda (November–December 1990); Leader of the Presidential Monitoring Team on FCI of Rural Feeder Roads Phase II constructed by DFRRI in Rivers State (February–March 1991); FAO Consultant in Agricultural Extension, Republic of Uganda (January–March 1991); Technical Advisor FGN/UNDP Project in on-farm crop storage, crop storage unit Federal Ministry of Agriculture, Moor Plantation, Ibadan (1993–1997); and Chairman of the Advisory Committee on the establishment of Nasarawa State University, appointed by the Governor of Nasarawa State (May 2000).
