= Aliyu Kama =

Nigerian politician and general

Brigadier General Aliyu Adu Umar Kama

Governor of Plateau State
- In office July 1988 – August 1990
- Preceded by: Lawrence Onoja
- Succeeded by: Joshua Madaki

Personal details
- Born: 15 June 1949 (age 76) Pella in Hong LGA, Adamawa State, Nigeria

Military service
- Allegiance: Nigeria
- Branch/service: Nigerian Army
- Rank: Brigadier General

Aliyu Adu Umar Kama (born 15 June 1949) was the military governor of Plateau State, Nigeria from July 1988 to August 1990 during the military regime of General Ibrahim Babangida.

Kama was born in Hong local government, Adamawa State of Kilba origins. He attended Government Secondary School, Yola (1963–1968), the Nigerian Defense Academy, Kaduna (1969–1972) and the Army school of supply and transport, Ibadan (1972).

Kama was an aspirant to be the People's Democratic Party (PDP) candidate for governor of Adamawa State in the 2007 elections. In 2009, he was one of the promoters of a new Amana State to be carved out of Adamawa. In June 2009 he was chairman of the board of Federal Superphosphate Fertilizer Company, Kaduna.
