= Chris Alli =

Nigerian soldier and army chief (1944–2023)

Major General Mohammed Chris Alli

Chief of Army Staff
- In office November 1993 – August 1994
- Preceded by: Aliyu Mohammed Gusau
- Succeeded by: Alwali Kazir

Governor of Plateau State
- In office 18 May 2004 – 18 November 2004 as Administrator of Plateau State
- Preceded by: Joshua Dariye (as governor)
- Succeeded by: Joshua Dariye (as governor)
- In office August 1985 – 1986
- Preceded by: Samuel Atukum
- Succeeded by: Lawrence Onoja

Personal details
- Born: 25 December 1944 Koton-Karfe, Northern Region, British Nigeria (now in Kogi State, Nigeria)
- Died: 19 November 2023 (aged 78) Lagos, Nigeria

Military service
- Allegiance: Nigeria
- Branch/service: Nigerian Army
- Years of service: 1967–1994
- Rank: Major General
- Commands: Commander, 3rd Infantry Brigade, Kano

Mohammed Chris Alli (25 December 1944 – 19 November 2023) was a Nigerian Army major general who served as Chief of Army Staff from 1993 to 1994 under General Sani Abacha's regime and was military governor of Plateau State Nigeria from August 1985 to 1986 during the military regime of General Ibrahim Babangida. Many years later, he was appointed interim administrator of the state during a 2004 crisis in the state following ethno-religious killings in Shendam, Yelwa Local Government.

== Military career ==
On 13 February 1976, army coup plotters assassinated the then head of state, General Murtala Mohammed. Alli was investigated for involvement in the coup attempt, but was exonerated. General Ibrahim Babangida appointed Alli military governor of Plateau State from August 1985 to 1986. During the attempted coup against General Ibrahim Babangida by Major Gideon Orkar on 22 April 1990, Colonel Alli was commander of the 3rd Infantry Brigade in Kano. He instructed several army commanders to make counter-broadcasts, as he did himself. The attempted coup failed. After the coup in November 1993, when President Ernest Shonekan was ousted by General Sani Abacha, Alli was appointed Chief of the Army Staff. Abacha dismissed him from this post in August 1994.

== Later career ==
In May 2004, Plateau state erupted in sectarian violence, which spilled over to Kano State. It was reported that over 50,000 people had died. President Olusegun Obasanjo declared emergency rule in the state and suspended Governor Joshua Dariye and the state assembly, appointing Alli as administrator. Alli quickly developed the Plateau Peace Program, involving dialog between religious, ethnic and community leaders, and a statewide peace conference. He also gave an amnesty to holders of weapons and a reward for their turning in their arms. Alli's measures were successful in calming the situation, and he handed back to civilian rule in November 2004.

== Death ==
On 19 November 2023, Alli died at the Military Hospital located in Lagos State. He was 78. The government identified the cause of death was as a result of a brief illness.

== Bibliography ==
- M. Chris Alli (2001). The Federal Republic of Nigerian Army: the siege of a nation. Malthouse Press. ISBN 978-023-127-7.

== See also ==
- List of governors of Plateau State
