= Dewan Gabriel =

Nigerian politician

Rt. Hon. Dewan Gabriel

Member of the Plateau State House of Assembly Legislature from the district

Speaker
- Incumbent
- Assumed office 21 November 2023
- Preceded by: Moses Sule
- Constituency: Pankshin North Constituency

Personal details
- Born: 22 April 1993 (age 33)
- Party: Young Progressives Party
- Education: Plateau State University

Dewan Kudangbena Gabriel (born 22 April 1993) is a Nigerian politician. He currently serves as the representative representing Pankshin North constituency in the 10th Plateau State House of Assembly. He is also serving as the Speaker. He is the youngest to assume the position of House speaker.

== Background ==
Dewan is from the Ngas tribe in Plateau State.

== Education ==
He is a graduate from Plateau State University, Bokkos.

== Plateau State House of Assembly Leadership ==
Under the leadership of Dewan, important bills such as the Plateau State Electricity Bill, Plateau State Minimum Wage were passed and signed into law by the Executive.

Amidst heightened political tension regarding the swearing-in of 16 opposition lawmakers affirmed by the Court of Appeal, Dewan inaugurated 9 lawmakers stating that the rest didn't meet requirements to be inaugurated.

== Empowerment ==
Dewan has gained popularity in his constituency and beyond for giving out donations to student's groups, indigent constituents. While it can be disputed, a narrative emanating from his political adversaries has emerged interpreting his donations as an attempt to warm his way into the hearts of the electorates ahead of future elections.
