= Michael Botmang =

Nigerian politician (1938–2014)

Chief Michael Botmang

Governor of Plateau State
- In office 13 November 2006 – 27 April 2007
- Deputy: Jethro Akun
- Preceded by: Joshua Dariye
- Succeeded by: Joshua Dariye

Deputy Governor of Plateau State
- In office 27 April 2007 – 29 May 2007
- Governor: Joshua Dariye
- Preceded by: Jethro Akun
- Succeeded by: Pauline Tallen
- In office 18 November 2004 – 13 November 2006
- Governor: Joshua Dariye
- Succeeded by: Jethro Akun
- In office 29 May 1999 – 18 May 2004
- Governor: Joshua Dariye

Personal details
- Born: 1938 Za'ang, Northern Region, British Nigeria (now in Plateau State, Nigeria)
- Died: 18 January 2014 (aged 75–76) Za'ang, Plateau State, Nigeria
- Party: Peoples Democratic Party
- Occupation: Politician; teacher; salesman

Chief Michael Botmang (1938 – 18 January 2014) was a Nigerian politician who served as the governor of Plateau State from 2006 to 2007, following the impeachment of Joshua Dariye. He served as deputy governor of Plateau State from 1999 to 2004; 2004 to 2006; and from April to May 2007 under Dariye.

On 9 September 2001, there were riots in Jos between Christians and Muslims. As acting governor, Botmang drafted both the police and the army to help return the state capital to order.

On 13 November 2006, Botmang was sworn in as governor of Plateau State following the impeachment of Joshua Dariye. He held that position until 27 April 2007, when the Supreme Court ordered the reinstatement of Dariye with immediate effect. Upon assuming office, he became the first governor of Plateau State of Berom origin.

In July 2008, the Economic and Financial Crimes Commission arraigned Botmang on a 31-count charge of fraud, alleging he had pocketed ₦1.5 billion during his tenure as Plateau State governor. He was released on bail a month later and his travel documents were returned so he could travel to the United Kingdom for medical treatment.

The fraud charges were later dropped by the EFCC on 12 June 2013, stating that there is evidence that the money borrowed from Intercontinental Bank when Botmang was governor was used to pay workers’ salaries and other government activities.

Botmang died on 18 January 2014, of kidney disease. He was 76.
