= Moses Sule =

Moses Sule is a Nigerian politician who is member representing Mikang Constituency and a speaker of the Plateau State House of Assembly. He was a former vice chairman of Mikang Local Government Area (LGA) in the state who was elected Speaker of the 10th Assembly on 13 June 2023.
