= Uju Kennedy-Ohanenye =

Nigerian lawyer and politician (born 1973)

- Born: 23 December 1973 (age 52); Nigeria
- Occupations: Lawyer, entrepreneur, politician, film producer
- Known for: First woman to run for the presidency in Nigeria under the All Progressives Congress (APC)
- Political party: All Progressives Congress

Uju Kennedy-Ohanenye (born 23 December 1973) is a Nigerian lawyer, entrepreneur, politician, and film producer. She was the first female candidate to contest the Nigerian presidency under the All Progressives Congress (APC) but later stepped down for Bola Tinubu. On 21 August 2023, President Bola Tinubu appointed her as Minister of Women Affairs and Social Development, a position she held until 23 October 2024.

== Early life and education ==
Uju Kennedy-Ohanenye was born in Nigeria on 23 December 1973. She earned her Bachelor of Laws degree from the University of Nigeria, Nsukka, in 1996 and was admitted to the Nigerian Bar in 1997. She holds a Master of Laws degree from the University of Abuja, obtained in 2002.

== Career ==
Kennedy-Ohanenye practices law and is a member of the Nigerian Bar Association. She is also involved in real estate and the education sector. As the CEO of Uju Kennedy-Ohanenye & Co, she provides legal services to individuals and corporations. She also serves as the founder and head of Uju Kennedy-Ohanenye Academy, a private educational institution.

She is actively engaged in the Nollywood film industry as a producer, with a portfolio that includes titles such as Mama Onboard, The Senator, The Governor, and The President. She is also the president of the Association of Nollywood Producers (ANP).

== Political involvement ==
Kennedy-Ohanenye became a member of the All Progressives Congress (APC) in 2015. She declared her candidacy for the Nigerian presidency during the 2023 general elections, making history as the first woman to do so under the APC. Her campaign emphasized women's empowerment, economic development, security, and anti-corruption. She opted to step down from the presidential race and publicly endorsed Bola Tinubu, the former governor of Lagos State.

On 21 August 2023, she was appointed as the Minister of Women Affairs by President Bola Tinubu, succeeding Pauline Tallen, who resigned for health reasons. The presidential swearing-in ceremony took place at the Presidential Villa in Abuja. Kennedy-Ohanenye became the third woman to hold this position after Aisha Alhassan and Pauline Tallen.

As the Minister of Women Affairs, Kennedy-Ohanenye pledged to focus on eradicating gender-based violence (GBV) and enhancing women's economic empowerment (WEE) in Nigeria. She also advocated for increased female representation in leadership roles and the implementation of the National Gender Policy.

== Personal life ==
Uju Kennedy-Ohanenye is married to Kennedy Ohanenye, a businessman and philanthropist. The couple has four children together.
