= Pauline Tallen =

Nigerian politician (born 1959)

Pauline Tallen OFR
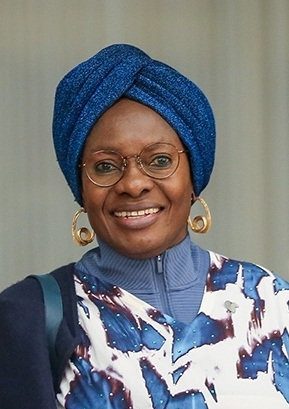
- Tallen in 2023

Minister of Women Affairs and Social Development
- In office 21 August 2019 – 29 May 2023
- President: Muhammadu Buhari
- Preceded by: Aisha Abubakar
- Succeeded by: Uju Kennedy-Ohanenye

Deputy Governor of Plateau State
- In office 29 May 2007 – 29 May 2011
- Governor: Jonah David Jang
- Preceded by: Michael Botmang
- Succeeded by: Ignatius Datong Longjan

Minister of State for Science and Technology
- In office 1999–2003
- President: Olusegun Obasanjo
- Preceded by: Bartholomew Nnaji
- Succeeded by: Isoun Turner

Personal details
- Born: 8 January 1959 (age 67) Shendam, Northern Region, British Nigeria (now in Plateau State, Nigeria)
- Party: All Progressives Congress (2014–present)
- Other political affiliations: Peoples Democratic Party (1998–2010; 2012–2014); Labour Party (2010–2012)
- Spouse: John Tallen (died 2017)
- Children: 5
- Education: University of Jos
- Occupation: Politician

Pauline Tallen OFR (born 8 January 1959) is a Nigerian politician who served as the Minister for Women Affairs and Social Development from 2019 to 2023. She was appointed in 2019 by President Muhammadu Buhari after turning down an ambassadorial nomination in 2015 on the grounds that she was not consulted prior to the announcement of the appointment and that she would not accept the offer for equal distribution of power among the three senatorial districts of her native state of plateau because she is from same local government as Governor Simon Lalong.

In 1999, she was appointed Minister of State for Science and Technology to the cabinet of former president, Olusegun Obasanjo. In 2007, she became the deputy governor of Plateau State and the first woman to be a deputy governor in northern Nigeria. She also contested to be governor of the state in 2011, but lost to Jonah David Jang. She is presently a member, board of trustees of the All Progressive Congress, and was honoured as woman of the year for her contribution to Nigeria at the 10th African Icon of Our Generation Award. She is a board member of National Agency for Control of Aids (NACA).

== Early life and education ==
Tallen is a native of Shendam, the daughter of father Nda Paul Kattiems. She earned a degree in sociology at the University of Jos in 1982.

== Political career ==
Tallen's political career started in 1976, when she was the clerical officer at Shendam local government council, then later ministry of local government affairs.

In 2011, she joined Labour Party, then contested in the gubernatorial election of the state. By 1994, she was made a councillor in Plateau State. She was made commissioner in the state by the military government between 1994 and 1999.

In 1999, she was appointed Minister of State for Science and Technology, becoming the first woman to be appointed as a minister in that capacity by former president, Olusegun Obasanjo.

Before the 2015 general elections, she decamped from the People's Democratic Party, PDP to the All Progressives Congress, APC, a move she believed angered some people in her state. However, she described the move as a calling from God, with no regrets. In 2015, she rejected an ambassadorial nomination by President Buhari, citing federal character and zoning in her state as reasons. In an interview with Leadership, she explained that as deputy governor she contested against the governor for the betterment of the state and because the governor didn't have the interest of the people at heart. She stated that the victory of President Buhari at the 2015 general elections was divinely orchestrated.

== Personal life ==
She was married to John Tallen, a chieftain of the People's Democratic Party, PDP who died in 2017. She has five children.

In 2013, Tallen's son took her to court for disrupting his freedom of expression and movement. She responded a few days later by having her son charged to court for burglary and theft of her jewelries for which her son was remanded in prison custody.

== Awards ==
- Merit Award by the National body of the National Council of Women Societies Abuja, for Outstanding contribution to the Development of Women in Nigeria – 1996
- Merit Award by the National Association of Plateau State Students Bauchi Federal Polytechnic for contributions towards the development of Education and Health Care in the State – 1996
- National Merit Award Honours in Science and Technology by the Executive Council of the Nigerian Engineering Scientific Forum – 1 July 2002.
- Merit Award in recognition on contributions to the development of womanhood in our great Nation, Nigeria and also in appreciation of her support for the sustenance of NCWS activities nationwide – 14 July 2001
- Plateau State Youth Council Merit Award in recognition of contribution to the growth and development of Youths in Plateau State Nigeria – 8 December 2002.
- Intra-Continental Media Network, ECOWAS DISTINGUISHED CORPORATE AWARD achievers Gold Award for unparalleled and imperishable contributions to the overall development of Nigeria and the Sub-region in both areas of economy and business. Having left an indelible legacy worthy of emulation by all and sundry.
- Award as Ambassador of National Assignment by the National Unity, Peace and Patriotic Ambassadors Foundation (NUPPAF).
- Award by the Nigerian Community in the US for her Tremendous contribution towards the development of Science and Technology in Nigeria – May 2002
- NBRRI Award in appreciation and recognition of service rendered towards the growth and development of Science and Technology in general and Nigerian Building and Road Research Institute in particular- 24 March 2004.
- Award of Excellence by the National Association of Zumunta USA Inc. Washington D.C – January 2000.
- Award as Model of Peace – Presented by Maryann Music Word Ministries Jos -2007
- Crime Fighter Award 2006/2007-The People Police Award of The Nigerian Police Force
- Award of Excellence as Pride of Mothers by Catholic Women Organisation, CWO of Nigeria, Abuja- 23 August 2014.
- African Icon of Our Generation Award 2015 (Woman of the Year Award) presented by International Center for Comparative Leadership for Africans and Blacks in Diaspora and Accolade Communications Limited
- Being the International Human Rights Day. Award of Ambassador of "My Body, My Right" (Cervical Cancer Campaign)
- (NCWS) Nigeria in Collaboration with (1 Ykow Global Foundation) Certificate of Merit National Award of Excellence on Service to Humanity. 22 November 2016.
- 20 January 2017 by Nigerian Role Models (A Compendium of distinguished Nigeria) Merit Award. The Most Valuable Quintessential Ambassador of the Year Award in our 9th African Leader Par Excellence Award 2016, which was held on 15 December 2016 at Excellence Hotel, Ogba Lagos.
- By Commonwealth Youth Council (CYC) Feb. 2017. Nelson Mandela's Africa Patriots Award, as African Patriotic Leader.
- Lifetime Achievement Award By UNDP, 2023.
