= Gyang Pwajok =

Nigerian politician (1966-2015)

Gyang Nyam Shom (GNS) Pwajok

Senator of the Federal Republic of Nigeria
- In office 2012–2015
- Preceded by: Gyang Dantong
- Succeeded by: Jonah David Jang
- Constituency: Plateau North Senatorial District

Chief of staff to Governor Jonah David Jang
- In office 2011–2012
- Preceded by: Ignatius Longjan
- Succeeded by: Francis Bot

Personal details
- Born: March 15, 1966
- Died: October 28, 2015 (aged 49)

Gyang Nyam Shom (GNS) Pwajok (March 15, 1966 – October 28, 2015) was a Nigerian politician and a member of the People's Democratic Party (PDP). Pwajok was the youngest national Senator during the upper chamber's 7th Assembly, which was in session from 2011 to 2015. He was the 2015 PDP candidate for Governor of Plateau State, but narrowly lost the Plateau gubernatorial election to Simon Lalong of the All Progressives Congress on April 11, 2015.

Pwajok was born on March 15, 1966. He was an academic and lecturer at the Plateau State Polytechnic and the University of Jos before entering politics. He served as the Director of Research and planning during the administration of former Plateau State Governor Jonah Jang from 2007 to 2012.

In 2012, Senator Gyang Dantong died while attending a mass funeral for victims of an unrest in Barkin-ladi. Gyang Pwajok won the 2012 Senatorial election to succeed Dantong in the Plateau North Senatorial zone. He was the youngest member of the Nigerian Senate, the upper house of the National Assembly, during the 7th Assembly, which met from 2012 to 2015.

Pwajok became the 2015 PDP nominee for Governor of Plateau State, defeating 15 other candidates in the PDP gubernatorial primary election. He narrowly lost the Plateau gubernatorial election to Simon Lalong of the All Progressives Congress on April 11, 2015.

Pwajok became ill on May 29, 2015, and left the country to seek medical treatment. He died from hepatocellular carcinoma, a form of liver cancer, at a hospital in India on October 28, 2015, at the age of 48. He was survived by his wife, Bridget Gyang Pwajok. His funeral was held at the Church of Christ In Nations (COCIN) in Du Jos South on November 13, 2015.
