= Sonni Gwanle Tyoden =

Nigerian academic and politician (1950–2025)

Deputy Governor of Plateau State
- In office 29 May 2015 – 29 May 2023
- Governor: Simon Lalong
- Preceded by: Ignatius Datong Longjan
- Succeeded by: Josephine Piyo

Vice Chancellor of the University of Jos
- In office 12 June 2006 – 11 June 2011
- Succeeded by: Hayward Mafuyai

Personal details
- Born: 22 September 1950
- Died: 4 May 2025 (aged 74)
- Party: All Progressives Congress
- Education: Lancaster University

Sonni Gwanle Tyoden (22 September 1950 – 4 May 2025) was a Nigerian professor of political science, educational administrator and politician who served as the deputy governor of Plateau State from 2015 to 2023. He was Vice Chancellor of the University of Jos from 2006 to 2011.

== Background ==
Tyoden was born on 22 September 1950. He attended Boys' Secondary School, Gindiri in Plateau State, Northern Nigeria, where he obtained the West Africa Senior School Certificate. He later proceeded to the University of Ibadan where he obtained a Bachelor of Science (B.Sc) Degree in Political Science. He obtained a Master of Science (M.Sc) and a Doctorate (Ph.D) Degree in International Relations and Political Economy from the University of Lancaster in the United Kingdom.

Tyoden died on 4 May 2025, at the age of 74.

== Career ==
Tyoden began his career in 1978, as an Assistant Secretary to Plateau State Government Ministry of Establishment. He later became a member of academic staff at the University of Jos, where he became a full Professor in 1990. After Tyoden became a Professor in 1990, he was appointed Head of the Department of Political Science, University of Abuja. He returned to his alma mater, the University of Jos in 2000, and became Dean of the Faculty of Social Sciences in 2001, a position he held till 2005. He was appointed Vice Chancellor of the University of Jos on 12 July 2006, a position he held until 11 June 2011. He contributed significantly to the development of the University. He was elected as Deputy Governor of Plateau State in 2015 under the platform of the APC.

== Awards and fellowships ==
- Certificate of Merit awarded by the Academic Staff Union of Universities (ASUU), University of Jos branch
- The Distinguished Academic Leadership award by the Rotary Club Naraguta, Jos, Plateau state,
- The Nigerian Institute of International Affairs in 2013
- The Social Science Academy of Nigeria in December 2014.

== Selected publications ==
- Inter and intra-party relations: towards a more stable party system in Nigeria.
- The Kaduna Mafia. Jos: Jos University Press. TakuyaThe Kaduna Mafia1987.
- The middle belt in Nigerian politics. AHA.
- Of Citizens and Citizens: The Dilemma of Citizenship in Nigeria.
- Tyoden, S. G. (1994). The Place of the Middle Belt in Nigeria's Power Equation. In Commission paper for the National Conference on" The Equity Question in Nigeria", Centre for Development Studies, University of Jos, 6–7 May.
- The Kaduna Mafia. Jos University Press.
- Nigeria: Youth agenda for the 21st century. Sibon Books.
- The Domestic Socio-Political Situation This includes, the nature of the political system, and the nature and conduct of the politics and government In other words, in a political system where the political. Towards the Survival of the Third Republic, 203.
- Vice Chancellor's Speech: Presented at the 24th Convocation Ceremony of the University of Jos.
- Towards a Progressive Nigeria. Triumph Publishing Company.

== See also ==
- List of vice-chancellors of Nigerian universities
- University of Jos
