= Napoleon Bali =

Nigerian politician and air force officer

Napoleon Binkap Bali

Senator for Plateau South
- In office 13 June 2023 – 2 November 2023
- Preceded by: Nora Dadu'ut
- Succeeded by: Simon Bako Lalong

Personal details
- Born: November 28, 1963 (age 62) Plateau State, Nigeria
- Education: Nigerian Defence Academy
- Occupation: Politician
- Profession: Military officer

Military service
- Allegiance: Nigeria
- Branch/service: Nigerian Air Force
- Rank: Air Vice Marshal

Napoleon Binkap Bali (born 28 November 1963) is a Nigerian retired Air Vice Marshal (AVM) and politician, Bali Served in the Nigerian Air forces for about 3 decades, during that time he held several senior appointments. He held the position of the Chief and Policy and Plans. After he retiring from military he went into politics as a member of the People's Democratic Party (PDP). Bali was elected into the Nigerian Senate to represent the Plateau South Senatorial District, in the 2023 general elections though the election was later cancelled following court precedings.

== Early life and background ==
Bali was born on 28 November 1963 to the family of Hassan Bali Tabut and Yinkat Bali in the village of Langtang, Langtang North Local Government of Plateau State, Nigeria. He attended Boys Secondary School, Gindiri from 1977 to 1982 before he went to the Nigerian Defense Academy as a member of the Regular Course and was commissioned into the Nigerian Air Force as a Pilot Officer in 1986. He later went to complete his flight and instructions training in 303 Flying Training School (FTS), Kano from 1990 to 1992. He was also trained as an Instructor Pilot (IP) on jet aircraft between 1998 and 1999 in the same Institution. He also went to the Joint Air Warfare Course in Hyderabad, India, graduating where he graduated with distinctions.

== Military career ==
Bali worked for the Nigerian Air Force for approximately 35 years, during his military career several appointments including Command, instructional, and staff appointments. He served as the Air Officer commanding mobility command and also as Chief of Policy and Plans at Air Force Headquarters before he retired as an Air Vice Marshal. During his military career he supported research and development initiatives aimed at improving aircraft maintenance and operational capability

== Political career ==
After his retirement from the Air Force, Bali went into politics. He joined the People's Democratic Party (PDP) and contested for the Senate seat in the Plateau south senatorial district in the Nigerian 2023 general elections. He was declared the winner of the election by the Independent National Electoral Commission (INEC) and was sworn in as the senator representing plateau south senatorial district in June 2023. His election was nullified by the National and State Assembly Election Petition Tribunal in September 2023. The Court of Appeal later upheld the tribunal's ruling, resulting in Simon Bako Lalong being declared the duly elected senator. During his stay in the Senate Bali contributed to and supported the discussions on national and regional affairs. In August 2023 he held a public argument against military intervention in politics related crises in the Republic of Niger mentioning economic and security concerns.
