= Zobe Dam =

- Interactive map of Zobe Dam
- Location: Katsina State, Nigeria
- Coordinates: 12°23′18″N 7°28′29″E
- Construction began: 1972
- Opening date: 1983

Dam and spillways
- Impounds: Karaduwa River
- Height: 48 m (157 ft)
- Length: 360 m (1,180 ft)
- Width (base): 2,750 m (9,020 ft)
- Spillway capacity: 2,083 m^{3}/s

Reservoir
- Creates: Zobe lake
- Total capacity: 179 Mca

Power Station
- Hydraulic head: 19 m

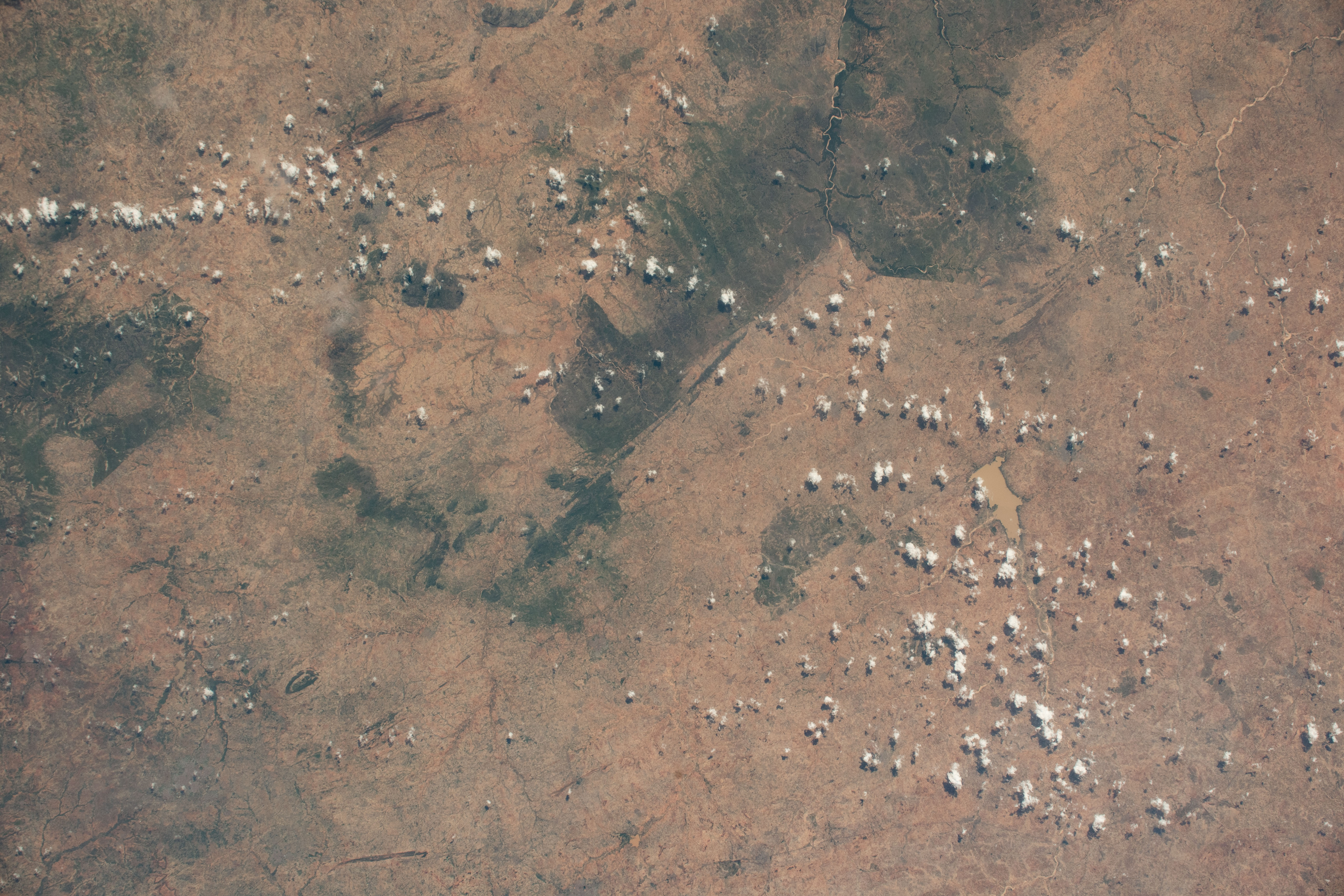
View of Nigeria taken during ISS Expedition 67, including the Zobe dam

The Zobe Dam is in Dutsin-Ma local government area of Katsina State in the north of Nigeria. It is an earth-fill structure with a height of 19 m and a total length of 2,750 m. The dam has a storage capacity of 179 Mca and irrigation potential of 8,000 hectares. Although the dam was completed in 1983, as of 2010, it was still not being used for water supply to Katsina city, for local irrigation or for power generation.

== Dam ==
Zobe Dam was conceived in the late 1970s during the administration of General Olusegun Obasanjo and was planned to supply 50% of drinking water for Katsina state while also supporting irrigation farming in the Dutsinma area. The dam was a Federal Urban Water Project built by the Shehu Shagari administration and completed in 1983. The water supply project was planned to be completed in 1995, but the US$122,000,000 project was abandoned due to non-funding. A 2004 safety review reported that, although the dam appeared stable, it had experienced seepage problems in the past, should be monitored closely, and should be modified to intercept the foundation seepage.

== Agricultural use ==
In September 1999, heavy rains caused the Zobe Dam to overflow, resulting in heavy crop losses. The flood washed away millet, groundnuts, guinea corn and beans. The farmers, who were inadequately compensated when the dam site was acquired, were destitute with the rainy season nearing its end and their corps destroyed.

In 2003, the water of the dam was stagnant and muddy, and evaporation and leakages were gradually emptying the dam. The authorities in charge of the dam had been forced to sink relief wells to ventilate the reservoir. The Sokoto-Rima River Basin had not yet cleared the land or released water for irrigation farming. The villagers could no longer use the water to water their crops, and the new lake was almost empty of fish. In August 2003, a past director of Katsina State Water Board said lack of focus and direction were the main obstacles to completion of Zobe Dam. He said that Zobe, one of the largest bodies of water in Nigeria, commissioned since 1982 and with huge irrigation potential, was lying wasted. In December 2005, farmers were demanding release of water from the dam.

== Hydro-electric supply ==
In June 2009, the Katsina State Government announced plans to set up a hydropower station at the unused dam to boost power supplies to the area and support mineral processing at the site. Engineer Musa Nashuni said the first step would be to investigate producing insulators for the electrification works, and after that the government would look into establishing plant to generate power for irrigation, water generation and local industries.

== Water supply project ==
The water supply project was intended to deliver 65,000 cubic metres (2,300,000 cu ft) of potable water to Katsina metropolis daily. In January 2003, the water treatment plant 2.5 km from the reservoir was half completed but had been abandoned. Booster stations and water tanks were in various stages of completion along the route to the city. The only pipe that had been laid of 111 kilometres (69 mi) required was the 2.1-kilometre stretch from the reservoir to the treatment plant. The water supply project needed #13 billion to be completed. President Olusegun Obasanjo approved the funding, and the next month paid a visit to the dam.

In August 2003, Governor Umaru Musa Yar'Adua said the state government had allocated #317 million in funding for a 16-kilometre supply of water from Zobe Dam to Dutsing town, due to be completed in September that year. He also warned of increased water tariffs in the state, since current rates were not enough to cover costs. In December 2004, Katsina Central Senator Umaru Tsauri said that the federal government had allocated #1 billion for completion of the project.

In November 2009, the state Commissioner for Water Resources said the Zobe Water work was almost 80% complete. He said, the project when completed would supply about 80 million litres of treated water per day. In December 2009, the Minister of Information and Communications, Dora Akunyili, discussed revised estimates for the Zobe Water Supply project. She said council had approved the revised consultancy fee from #123 million to #299 million. In March 2010, the Katsina State Commissioner for Water Resources, Alhaji Nasiru Danmusa, said Zobe Dam and others would soon be completed in due course. That month, the Federal government set up a Projects Assessment Committee to probe incomplete projects where the contractors had received large payments but the work was incomplete, including the Zobe dam project.
