= Plateau State University =

University In Diram, Bokkos, Nigeria

- Motto: Knowledge, Diligence and Integrity
- Established: 2005
- Vice-Chancellor: Professor Shedrack Best
- Administrative staff: 540
- Location: PMB 2012, Bokkos, Plateau State, Nigeria
- Nickname: PLASU
- Website: Plateau State University Official Website

Plateau State University is a university in Bokkos, Plateau State, Nigeria. It was established in 2005. It was granted recognition by the National Universities Commission (NUC) on April 29, 2005, as the 66th university in Nigeria and the 24th state-owned university in the country.

The Law Establishing the university is cited as Law No. 4 of 2005 (March 7, 2005) as contained in Plateau State of Nigeria Gazette No. 3, Vol. 11 of May 24, 2006. It is located in Diram Village along the Butura-Tarangol axis in Bokkos Local Government Area, about 70 kilometres away from Jos, the Plateau State capital.

Although academic activities started in May 2007 with a total of 480 students, such activities were suspended on September 10 of the same year and the students were transferred to the University of Jos. The university was, however, re-opened in October 2010 during the 2010/2011 academic session with lectures commencing in January 2011.

In March 2016, the National Universities Commission gave accreditation to the first 17 programmes in the university. This gave the university a "full university" status.Presently, more faculties have been introduced and running undergraduate programs, and also school of Post Graduate Programs.

== Facilities ==
1. Faculty of Arts.

2. Faculty of Social Sciences.

3. Faculty of Natural and Applied Sciences

4. Faculty of Law.

5. Faculty of Health Sciences.

6. Faculty of Education.

7. Faculty of Agricultural Sciences.

8. Faculty of Building Engineering
