= Caleb Mutfwang =

Nigerian lawyer and politician (born 1965)

His Excellency Caleb Mutfwang
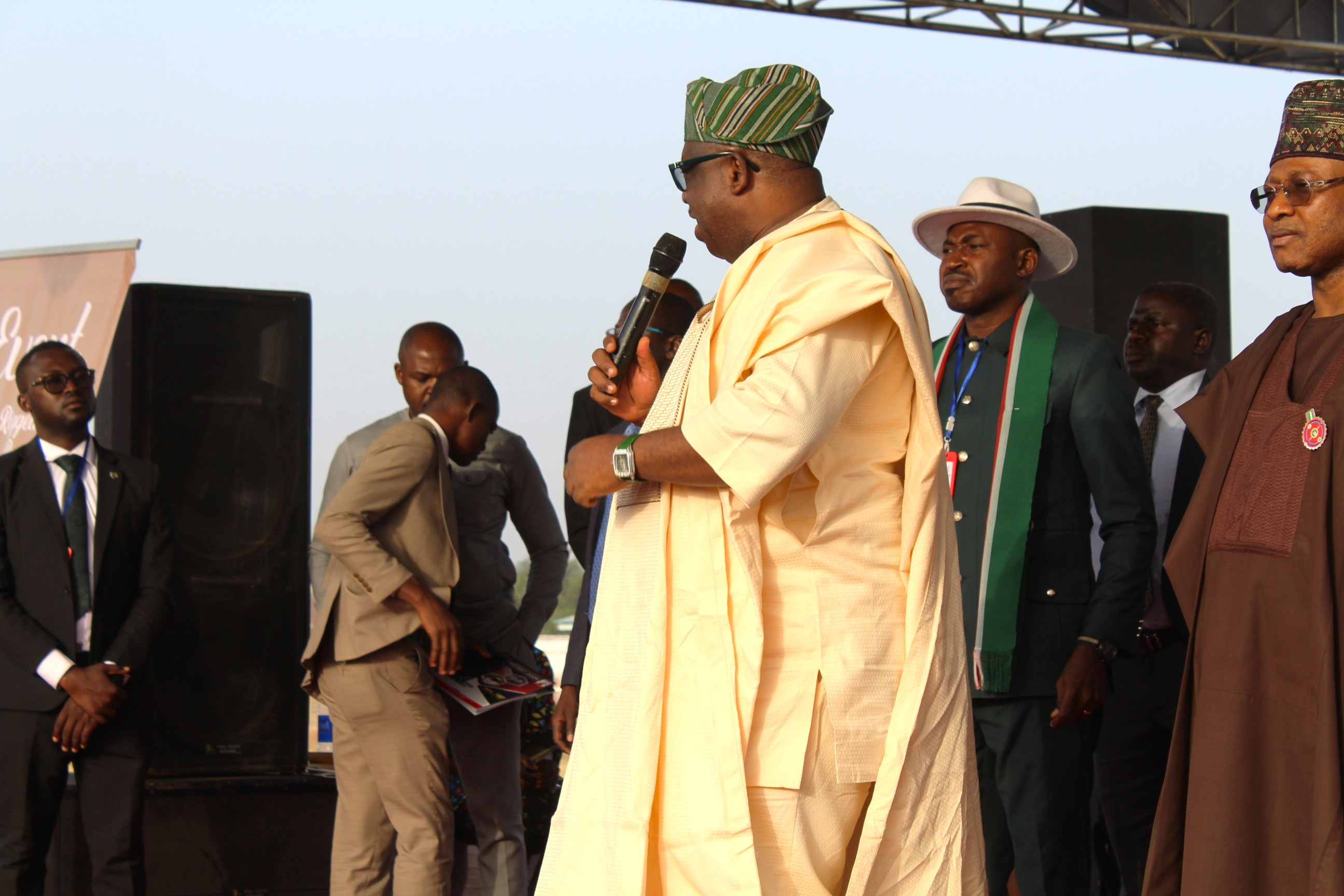
- Mutfwang in December 2024

Governor of Plateau State
- Incumbent
- Assumed office 29 May 2023
- Deputy: Josephine Piyo
- Preceded by: Simon Lalong

Personal details
- Born: Caleb Manasseh Mutfwang; 12 March 1965 (age 61)
- Party: All Progressive Congress
- Spouse: Helen Caleb Mutfwang
- Children: 3
- Education: School of Preliminary Studies
- Alma mater: University of Jos; Nigerian Law School
- Occupation: Politician; lawyer
- Website: https://calebmutfwang.org/

Caleb Manasseh Mutfwang (born 12 March 1965) is a Nigerian lawyer and politician who is the current governor of Plateau State since 2023. He is a former Chairman of Mangu Local Government Area of Plateau State. Mutfwang was sworn in as governor on 29 May 2023.

== Early life and education ==
Caleb Mutfwang born on 12 March 1965 in Wussasa, Zaria. He had his primary education at LEA Primary School Ampang-West, Mangu LGA from 1973 to 1977 and went to Boys Secondary School, Gindiri graduating in 1982.

Mutfwang worked briefly with the then Federal Office of Statistics and the defunct Nigerian Bank for Commerce of Industry (NBCI) before continuing his educational pursuit at the School of Preliminary Studies, Keffi from 1983 to 1984.

He attended the University of Jos between 1984 and 1988 and the Nigerian Law School from 1988 which qualified him to be called to the Nigerian Bar as a solicitor and advocate of the Supreme Court on 14 December 1989.

Mutfwang served the mandatory National Youth Service Corps (NYSC) programme in Kaduna State during which he was elected by his colleagues as the President of the Nigerian Christian Corpers' Fellowship in Kaduna State.

== Personal life ==
Mutfwang is married to Helen Caleb Mutfwang and they have three children; Timothy, Nanbam, and Enoch. He is a Christian and attends Church of Christ in Nations.
