= Fidelis Tapgun =

Nigerian politician

Fidelis Naanmiap Tapgun

Governor of Plateau State
- In office January 1992 – 23 October 1993
- Preceded by: Joshua Madaki
- Succeeded by: Samuel Adewole Adejumo

Federal Minister of Industry
- In office 7 July 2005 – 10 January 2007
- Succeeded by: Aliyu Modibbo Umar

Personal details
- Party: People's Democratic Party (PDP)

Fidelis Naanmiap Tapgun was born on 1 November 1945 in Shendamm Town, plateau state. He was elected governor of Plateau State during the Nigerian Third Republic. Later he was Nigerian Ambassador to Kenya. He was appointed Federal Minister of Industry by President Olusegun Obasanjo.

== Early career ==
Tapgun a graduate of Political Science (1974) Ahmadu Bello University, Zaria was in the same class with Abdullahi Aliyu Sumaila. Tapgun worked with the civil service for 27 years...He ran successfully for Governor of Plateau State on the Social Democratic Party platform, taking office in January 1992. However, the National elections the next year were aborted by a military coup that led to General Sani Abacha taking power.

After the return to democracy in 1999, he was appointed Ambassador to Kenya in 2000. In February 2001, as Permanent Representative of the Nigerian Permanent Mission to the United Nations Environment Programme, he attended a Commonwealth Consultative Group on Environment in Nairobi. Tapgun was Director-General of the Obasanjo-Atiku Campaign Organisation between 2002 and 2003, helping ensure that Obasanjo was reelected in the April 2003 elections. On 14 August 2003, he formally said farewell to Kenyan President Mwai Kibaki at State House, Nairobi.

President Olusegun Obasanjo declared a six-month state of emergency in Plateau State on 18 May 2004. Tapgun was among elders who argued that the state of emergency should last longer, to give time to restore lasting peace.

== Minister of Industry ==
Tapgun was confirmed as Federal Minister of Industry on 7 July 2005. In August 2005, he said that the issue of the competitiveness of local products was one of the Federal Government's major challenges. He announced formation of two new standardization bodies to help improve quality, In September 2005, speaking at the launch of a N5.6 billion all steel radial truck factory built by Dunlop Plc, Nigeria, he claimed that growth in capacity utilization in the steel industry showed that recent reforms had made Nigeria a more business-friendly environment. The chairman of Dunlop did not agree, but said there was future promise. In December 2005, Tapgun emphasized the importance of the private sector in developing the country, and said the government would continue to support private-sector initiatives.

In July 2006, with soaring cement prices due to lack of supply, Tapgun was head of an inter-ministerial committee to assess the investors in the industry. Tapgun visited the site of a closed cement factory in Ebonyi State, stalled due to a dispute between the state government and company management. Despite reassurances that the plant would soon reopen, it was still closed as of November 2009. In January 2007, Tapgun became a Minister of State in the newly combined Ministry of Commerce and Industry.

== Later career ==
In April 2009, former president Obasanjo unsuccessfully attempted to have Tapgun appointed as secretary of the PDP.

In 2009, he visited China as a member of the National Organisation Committee of the first Nigeria - China Trade and Investment Forum, accompanied by Governor Olagunsoye Oyinlola of Osun State and other senior Nigerian officials. The two governments agreed to partner on trade and investment.

In February 2010, Tapgun was appointed co-chairman of a 15-member committee set up to find an enduring solution to the constant crises in the North Central Nigerian city of Jos, Plateau state.
