= Joshua Dariye =

Nigerian accountant and politician (born 1957)

Senator for Plateau Central
- In office 6 June 2011 – 9 June 2019
- Preceded by: Satty Davies Gogwim
- Succeeded by: Hezekiah Dimka

Governor of Plateau State
- In office 27 April 2007 – 29 May 2007
- Deputy: Michael Botmang
- Preceded by: Michael Botmang
- Succeeded by: Jonah David Jang
- In office 18 November 2004 – 13 November 2006
- Deputy: Michael Botmang
- Preceded by: Chris Alli
- Succeeded by: Michael Botmang
- In office 29 May 1999 – 18 May 2004
- Deputy: Michael Botmang
- Preceded by: Musa Shehu
- Succeeded by: Chris Alli

Personal details
- Born: Joshua Chibi Dariye; 27 July 1957 (age 69) Bokkos, Northern Region, British Nigeria (now in Plateau State, Nigeria)
- Party: All Progressives Congress
- Other political affiliations: Peoples Democratic Party; Labour Party
- Spouse: Valentina Dariye
- Children: Nanle; Joy; Ebenezer; Ruth
- Occupation: Politician; accountant

Joshua Chibi Dariye (born 27 July 1957) is a Nigerian politician who served as the senator representing the Plateau Central senatorial district from 2011 to 2019. He previously served as the governor of Plateau State from 1999 to 2006 when he was impeached. He was later re-instated by the Supreme Court of Nigeria in the same year and he continued his tenure until May 2007.

== Background ==
Dariye was born on 27 July 1957 in Mushere, Bokkos in Plateau State, Nigeria, Dariye was a businessman before venturing into politics. He was also a strong mobilizer for Olusegun Obasanjo's presidential re-election in the Peoples Democratic Party primaries in 1999 as well as election proper in 2003.

== Political career ==
=== Governor of Plateau State ===
As governor, Dariye was arrested in London, England on 20 January 2004. Because Nigerian governors are protected by immunity during their tenure, the Economic and Financial Crimes Commission (EFCC) arrested him in 2007 when his tenure ended, charging him of money laundering of about 9 million dollars.

=== Impeachment ===
In early October 2006, eight of the twenty-four state assembly members issued an impeachment notice against Dariye. In his defence, he stated that the notice was invalid as the eight did not form a quorum of the assembly as required by the law. A crowd of Dariye's supporters tried to prevent the assembly members from entering the state assembly building. Riot police then fired into the crowd, killing two protestors.

Dariye was impeached on 13 November 2006. His deputy, Michael Botmang, replaced him as the governor. On 10 March 2007, after a Court of Appeal ordered Dariye reinstated as governor, the state government announced its intention to appeal to the Supreme Court of Nigeria. On 27 April 2007, the Supreme Court rejected the state government's petition and clarified the further reinstation of Dariye.

Following his reinstatement, Dariye's term of office as Governor of Plateau State concluded on 29 May 2007.

=== Senator ===
In April 2011, Dariye was elected Senator for Plateau Central Senatorial District under the Labour Party. He received 189,140 votes, defeating Dawuda Gowon of the PDP, younger brother of former head of state, Yakubu Gowon, who received 160,106 votes. On 28 March 2015, he was re-elected after having 189,150 votes.

== Criminal trial ==
Nigeria's anti-corruption agency, the Economic and Financial Crimes Commission (EFCC), in 2007, filed 23 counts of money laundering charges involving alleged diversion of about N1.126 billion Plateau State Government's ecological funds, against Dariye.

He pleaded not guilty to the charges following which the trial judge, Justice Adebukola Banjoko, fixed 13 November 2007 for the commencement of trial.

But before that date, Dariye filed an application, challenging the competence of the charges and the jurisdiction of the court. He argued that he ought to be tried before a Plateau State High Court and not the FCT High Court.

On 13 December 2007, the trial judge heard and dismissed Dariye's application for lacking in merit. Dariye appealed against the ruling of the court. But the Abuja Division of the Court of Appeal affirmed the decision of Justice Banjoko. Dariye subsequently appealed to the Supreme Court.

But the apex court, on 27 February 2015 dismissed Dariye's appeal and ordered him to submit himself for trial.

=== Trial resumes ===
The Supreme Court's judgment delivered on 27 February 2015, the former Plateau State Governor's trial resumed after about nine years of delay on 26 January 2016. The EFCC called its first prosecution witness, Musa Sunday, who is a detective with the anti-graft agency and who was involved in the investigation of Dariye for the alleged crime. Sunday, during his testimony before Justice Banjoko gave a breakdown of his team's report of investigation revealing how the ecological funds obtained by Dariye, as then governor of Plateau State, was allegedly diverted.

=== Conviction ===
The High Court of the Federal Capital Territory, Gudu, Abuja, on Tuesday 12 June 2018 sentenced Dariye to 14 years' imprisonment on the charges of criminal breach of trust and misappropriation of funds (1.6 billion naira) while he was the Governor of Plateau state. The sentence was then appealed and eventually, the Supreme Court gave a final verdict of a 10 years sentence for the offence committed.

=== Reduction of jail term ===
The Court of Appeal sitting in Abuja on Friday 16 November 2018 reduced the 14-year sentence against Dariye to 10 years. The presiding judge of the court, Justice Stephen Adah, reduced the charges in the counts to 10 years, while the terms with two years are reduced to one year each. The sentences are to run concurrently.

=== Pardon and release from prison ===
On 14 April 2022, the federal government of Nigeria granted presidential pardons to Joshua Dariye and Jolly Nyame, both former governors of Plateau and Taraba, respectively. The action was widely criticised by civil society organisations and the general public.

== See also ==
- List of governors of Plateau State
