= Jonah David Jang =

Nigerian politician and military officer (born 1944)

His Excellency Jonah David Jang CON

Senator for Plateau North
- In office 9 June 2015 – 9 June 2019
- Preceded by: Gyang Pwajok
- Succeeded by: Istifanus Gyang

Chairman of the Nigeria Governors' Forum
- In office 25 May 2013 – 29 May 2015
- Preceded by: Rotimi Amaechi
- Succeeded by: Abdul'aziz Abubakar Yari

Governor of Plateau State
- In office 29 May 2007 – 29 May 2015
- Deputy: Pauline Tallen (2007–2011); Ignatius Datong Longjan (2011–2015)
- Preceded by: Joshua Dariye
- Succeeded by: Simon Lalong

Military Governor of Gongola State
- In office August 1986 – December 1987
- Preceded by: Yohanna Madaki
- Succeeded by: Isa Mohammed

Military Governor of Benue State
- In office August 1985 – August 1986
- Preceded by: John Atom Kpera
- Succeeded by: Yohanna Madaki

Personal details
- Born: 13 March 1944 (age 82) Du, Northern Region, British Nigeria (now in Plateau State, Nigeria)
- Party: Peoples Democratic Party
- Spouse: Ngo Talatu Jang
- Education: Nigerian Defence Academy
- Occupation: Politician; military officer

Military service
- Allegiance: Nigeria
- Branch/service: Nigerian Airforce
- Years of service: 1965–1990
- Rank: Air Commodore

Jonah David Jang CON (born 13 March 1944) is a former Nigerian military officer and politician who served as the senator representing the Plateau North senatorial district from 2015 to 2019. He previously served as the governor of Plateau State from 2007 to 2015, and as military governor of Benue and Gongola States.

In 2015, Jang ran and won the Plateau North senatorial district seat as his term as governor drew to a close. In 2018, Jang declared his senate seat vacant and said it was time for the people of Plateau North to decide who would represent them at the red chamber. Jang was at the time making nocturnal political consultations to run for the presidential ticket of the main opposition, Peoples Democratic Party (PDP) for the 2019 presidential election.

== Early life ==
Jonah David Jang was born on 13 March 1944 in Du, Jos South local government area of Plateau State. In 1965, he enlisted as an Air Force Officer Cadet at the Military Training School in Kaduna. He was given flight training at Uetersen in West Germany (1965–1966) and further training at the Nigerian Defence Academy, Kaduna. He was commissioned 2nd Lieutenant in 1969 and promoted to lieutenant in 1970. He attended a course on Supply Operations Training (Logistics) in Denver, Colorado, United States and was promoted to the rank of captain in 1972, major in 1975 and wing commander in 1978, serving in most of the Nigerian air formations during this period.

During the military regime of General Ibrahim Babangida he served as Military Governor of Benue State from August 1985 to August 1986, then as Military Governor of Gongola State from August 1986 to December 1987.

He voluntarily retired from the Nigeria Air Force in 1990. Jonah Jang took a Bachelor of Divinity Degree at the Theological College of Northern Nigeria (2000–2002). In 2007, he successfully contested the governorship election in Plateau State on the platform of the People's Democratic Party (PDP). He ran successfully for reelection on 26 April 2011.

== Adventure into politics ==
Jang was a founding member of the Peoples Democratic Party in the days that preceded the second military to civilian transfer of power in 1999 ushering the Nigerian Fourth Republic.

In the new millennium democratic dispensation for which Jang had so much fought to wrest power from the military, he made an unsuccessful run for the governorship of Plateau State in an election which was marred by alleged forms of irregularities and malpractices on the platform of the All Nigeria Peoples Party. Initially, he had sought the PDP governorship nomination prior in 1999 but lost after which he decamped to the opposition ANPP to make yet another run for governorship again that was to prove futile. According to an ally, James Vwi, Jang was already considering and making a series of consultations on running for the Nigerian Senate to represent Plateau North senatorial district shortly before his opportune moment came. He was able to craft an alliance with a number of political bigwigs while mobilising an incredible amount of funds and put up a fight in the Plateau PDP gubernatorial primary election of 2006 which he won.

Jang is a native Berom and is a proponent of massive infrastructural development. During his tenure as Governor of Plateau State, some of his achievements included: road construction through the length and breadth of the state, rehabilitation of public water supply, agricultural partnership program between the state and Israeli experts (ASTC) and in environmental sanitation to mention a few. As Governor, Jang embarked on a thorough purge of the Plateau State Civil Service ridding it of unwanted corrupt elements mostly in the form of ghost workers. He is regarded by many as having recorded achievements comparable only to those of the first Governor of the state, Police Commissioner Joseph Gomwalk. He has a lot of experience in military and security matters which owes to his prudent management of the Tiv/Jukun crisis during his tenure as Military Governor of the old Gongola State.

== Corruption trial ==
On 16 May 2018, Jang was arraigned at a Plateau State High Court by the EFCC, over allegations of fraud to the tune of 6.3 billion naira belonging to Plateau State, allegedly perpetrated when he was Governor of the state. He was remanded in Jos prison after his application for bail was declined by the court. Nine days later, he was granted a N100m bail.

On 28 August 2018 Jang formally declared his interest to run for president of the Federal Republic of Nigeria at the Plateau State PDP secretariat. He lost the primary election.

Jonah Jang was discharged and acquitted of corruption charges, on 2 September 2022.

== Legacy ==
In the final days of his second tenure as chief executive of Plateau State, Jonah Jang sought for a successor to carry on with his legacy of infrastructural development and governmental reforms. His eyes fell on Gyang Pwajok, who was at the time completing the term of the late Senator Gyang Dantong. Gyang Pwajok was described as young, intellectual and virile and was thought to be the most suitable for the job. He was seen a bridge between the old and young generations and was very representative of a proper transition from the gerontocracy to a new epoch in the political history of the state. However, certain forces, spearheaded by Jang's predecessor and long time rival Joshua Dariye, began to campaign against a Berom back to back leadership of the state. They campaigned on the pretextual premise that having had two governors that both served 8 year tenures from the central senatorial district and the northern senatorial district respectively, since the advent of the Nigerian Fourth Republic it was only proper that a zoning of the gubernatorial office be instituted in the state thus the seat be zoned this time to the southern senatorial district of the state. And so they joined forces with all the minority tribes of the state and planned to override the choice. The Beroms (from which Gyang Pwajok came) and other citizens aligned with Gyang Pwajok's style of governance went to the polls and got the vote. However, other forces at large were at play and managed to tip the scales in favour of Simon Lalong of the All Progressives Congress (APC) and he was announced the winner of the election. Simon Lalong was a long time protégé of Joshua Dariye and served as speaker of the Plateau State House of Assembly when Dariye was governor of the state.

== See also ==
- List of governors of Plateau State
