= Simon Lalong =

Nigerian politician and lawyer (born 1963)

Simon Lalong CON

Senator for Plateau South
- Incumbent
- Assumed office 20 December 2023
- Preceded by: Napoleon Bali

Minister of Labour and Employment
- In office 21 August 2023 – 20 December 2023
- Preceded by: Chris Ngige

Governor of Plateau State
- In office 29 May 2015 – 29 May 2023
- Deputy: Sonni Gwanle Tyoden
- Preceded by: Jonah David Jang
- Succeeded by: Caleb Mutfwang

Speaker of the Plateau State House of Assembly
- In office 2000–2007

Personal details
- Born: Simon Bako Lalong; 5 May 1963 (age 63) Shendam, Northern Region (now in Plateau State), Nigeria
- Party: All Progressives Congress
- Education: Ahmadu Bello University; University of Jos
- Occupation: Politician; lawyer; businessman

Simon Bako Lalong CON (born 5 May 1963) is a Nigerian lawyer and politician who has served as the senator representing the Plateau South senatorial district since 2023. He previously served as the minister of labour and employment in 2023, and as the governor of Plateau State from 2015 to 2023.

== Education ==
After his elementary and secondary schools education in Shendam Local Government Area, Lalong proceeded to the School of Preliminary Studies (S.P.S) Keffi, passing out in 1986. He then continued to Ahmadu Bello University, Zaria, graduating in 1990 with a bachelor's degree in law. This was immediately followed by the Law School in Lagos, where he was also called to the Bar. He later obtained a master's degree in law from the University of Jos, in 1996.

== Professional career ==
Lalong's professional career as an attorney lasted between 1992, the year following his graduation from law school, and 1998, the dawn of Nigeria's new democracy. During this period he worked with a few law firms, one of which he co-owned. Between 1992 and 1994, he was the Deputy Scribe of the Nigerian Bar Association in Plateau State. After a political stint that lasted seven years he again returned to legal practice as the Principal Partner of Simon B. Lalong and Co, until 2015.

== Political life ==
In 1998, Lalong temporarily discarded legal practice to pursue a political career. Representing the People's Democratic Party (PDP), he successfully contested his native Shendam Constituency and entered the Plateau State House of Assembly. In October 2000, he became the speaker of the assembly, a position he occupied until 2006. He was the longest serving speaker of the State's house of assembly. During that period he was two times (in 2001 and in 2002) elected as the Chairman of the Conference of Speakers of the 36 states of Nigeria.

In 2014, Lalong joined the race contest to succeed outgoing governor, Jonah Jang, on the platform of the All Progressive Congress (APC). He won and was sworn in as the new governor of Plateau State on 29 May 2015.

In the 9 March Plateau gubernatorial election and 23 March 2019 Plateau State, Lalong won re-election as governor of Plateau State, polling 595,582 votes against his rival, former General Jeremiah Husseini of the People's Democratic Party (PDP), who polled 546,813 votes. He was sworn in for a second term on 29 May 2019.

In the 2023 general election, Lalong contested the seat of the senate to represent Plateau South senatorial zone in the National Assembly, but lost the election to Napoleon Bali of the People's Democratic Party. Lalong was later appointed Minister of Labour and Employment on 2 August 2023.

In November 2023, an appeals court declared Lalong as the rightful winner of the 2023 senatorial election.

== See also ==
- List of governors of Plateau State

== Award ==
In October 2022, a Nigerian National Honour of Commander Of The Order Of The Niger (CON) was conferred on him by President Muhammadu Buhari.
