= List of governors of Plateau State =

Military Administrators and Governors of Plateau State

This is a list of administrators and governors of Plateau State, Nigeria. During the military era, governors were generally referred to as Military Administrators and were subject to changes and postings as the powers from the centre dictated.

== Governors ==
No.	Image	Governor	Took office	Left office	Title
1		Sir Frederick John Dealtry Lugard	1900	1906	High Commissioner of Northern Nigeria
2		Sir Percy Girouard	1907	1909	High Commissioner of Northern Nigeria
3		Sir Henry Hesketh Bell	1909	1911	High Commissioner of Northern Nigeria
4		Charles Lindsay Temple	1911	1912	High Commissioner of Northern Nigeria
5		Sir Frederick John Dealtry Lugard	1912	1914	Lieutenant Governor of Northern Nigeria
6		Charles Lindsay Temple	1914	1917	Lieutenant Governor
7		Herbert Symonds Goldsmith	1917	1921	Lieutenant Governor
8		Sir William Frederick Gowers	1921	1925	Lieutenant Governor
9		Sir Herbert Richmond Palmer	1925	1930	Lieutenant Governor
10		Cyril Wilson Alexander	1930	1932	Chief Commissioner
11		George Sinclair Browne	1932	1936	Chief Commissioner
12		Sir Theodore Samuel Adams	1936	1943	Chief Commissioner
13		Sir John Robert Patterson	1943	1947	Chief Commissioner
14		Eric Westbury Thompstone	1947	1951	Chief Commissioner
15		Sir Eric Westbury Thompstone	1951	1952	Lieutenant Governor
16		Sir Eric Westbury Thompstone	1952	1953	Governor General of Northern Nigeria
17		Sir Bryan Sharwood-Smith	1 October 1954	2 December 1957	Governor General of Northern Nigeria
18		Sir Muhammadu Sanusi I	1957	Acted for six months	Acting Governor General of Northern Nigeria for six months during the administration of Sir Gawain Westray Bell
19		Sir Gawain Westray Bell	2 December 1957	1962	Governor General of Northern Nigeria
20		Alhaji Sir Kashim Ibrahim	1962	16 January 1966	Governor
21		Hassan Usman Katsina	16 January 1966	27 May 1967	Governor (military)

=== Governor of Benue-Plateau State ===
#	Image	Name	Title	Took office	Left office	Party
22		Joseph Gomwalk	Governor	1966	July 1975	Military
23		Abdullahi Mohammed	Governor	July 1975	February 1976	Military

=== Governors of Plateau State ===
#	Image	Name	Title	Took office	Left office	Party
24		Dan Suleiman	Administrator	March 1976	July 1978	Military
25		Joshua Anaja	Administrator	July 1978	October 1979	Military
26		Solomon Lar	Governor	October 1979	December 1983	NPP
27		Samuel Atukum	Administrator	January 1984	August 1985	Military
28		Chris Alli	Administrator	August 1985	1986	Military
29		Lawrence Onoja	Administrator	1986	July 1988	Military
30		Aliyu Kama	Administrator	July 1988	August 1990	Military

== Governors ==
#	Image	Name	Title	Took office	Left office	Party
31		Joshua Madaki	Administrator	August 1990	January 1992	Military
32		Fidelis Tapgun	Governor	January 1992	November 1993	SDP
33		Mohammed Mana	Administrator	9 December 1993	22 August 1996	Military
34		Habibu Idris Shuaibu	Administrator	22 August 1996	August 1998	Military
35		Musa Shehu	Administrator	August 1998	May 1999	Military
36		Joshua Dariye	Governor	29 May 1999	18 May 2004	PDP
37		Chris Alli	Sole Administrator	18 May 2004	18 November 2004	interim (6-month state of emergency declared)
38		Joshua Dariye	Governor	18 November 2004	13 November 2006	PDP
39		Michael Botmang	Governor	13 November 2006	27 April 2007	PDP
40		Joshua Dariye	Governor	27 April 2007	29 May 2007	PDP
41		Jonah David Jang	Governor	29 May 2007	29 May 2015	PDP
42		Simon Bako Lalong	Governor	29 May 2015	29 May 2023	APC
43		Caleb Manasseh Mutfwang	Governor	29 May 2023	Incumbent	APC

== See also ==
- States of Nigeria
- List of state governors of Nigeria
