= Plateau State House of Assembly =

Legislative arm of the government of Plateau State of Nigeria

The Plateau State House of Assembly is the legislative arm of the government of Plateau State of Nigeria. It is a unicameral legislature with 24 members elected from the 17 local government areas of the state. Local government areas with considerable larger population are delineated into two constituencies to give equal representation. This makes the number of legislators in the Plateau State House of Assembly 25.

The fundamental functions of the Assembly are to enact new laws, amend or repeal existing laws and oversight of the executive. Members of the assembly are elected for a term of four years concurrent with federal legislators (Senate and House of Representatives). The Legislators are known as Members of State House of Assembly. The state assembly convenes three times a week (Tuesdays, Wednesdays and Thursdays) in the assembly complex within the state capital, Jos.

The speaker of the 9th Plateau State House of Assembly was Hon. Moses Sule who is a first time member from Mikang LGA. He took over from Hon. Abok Ayuba who was impeached and replaced by Yakubu Yakson Sanda. Abok Ayuba was later restored as speaker by the Court. With the imminent sacking of 16 lawmakers by the Court of Appeal on the grounds of disobedience to court order and lack of party structure, Moses Sule with the deputy speaker and other principal officers of the House resigned leading to the emergence of Young Progressives Party Dewan Gabriel as the speaker.

The speaker of the 10th Plateau State House of Assembly is Naanlong Gapyil Daniel.
