= Plateau State =

State of Nigeria

Plateau
- State
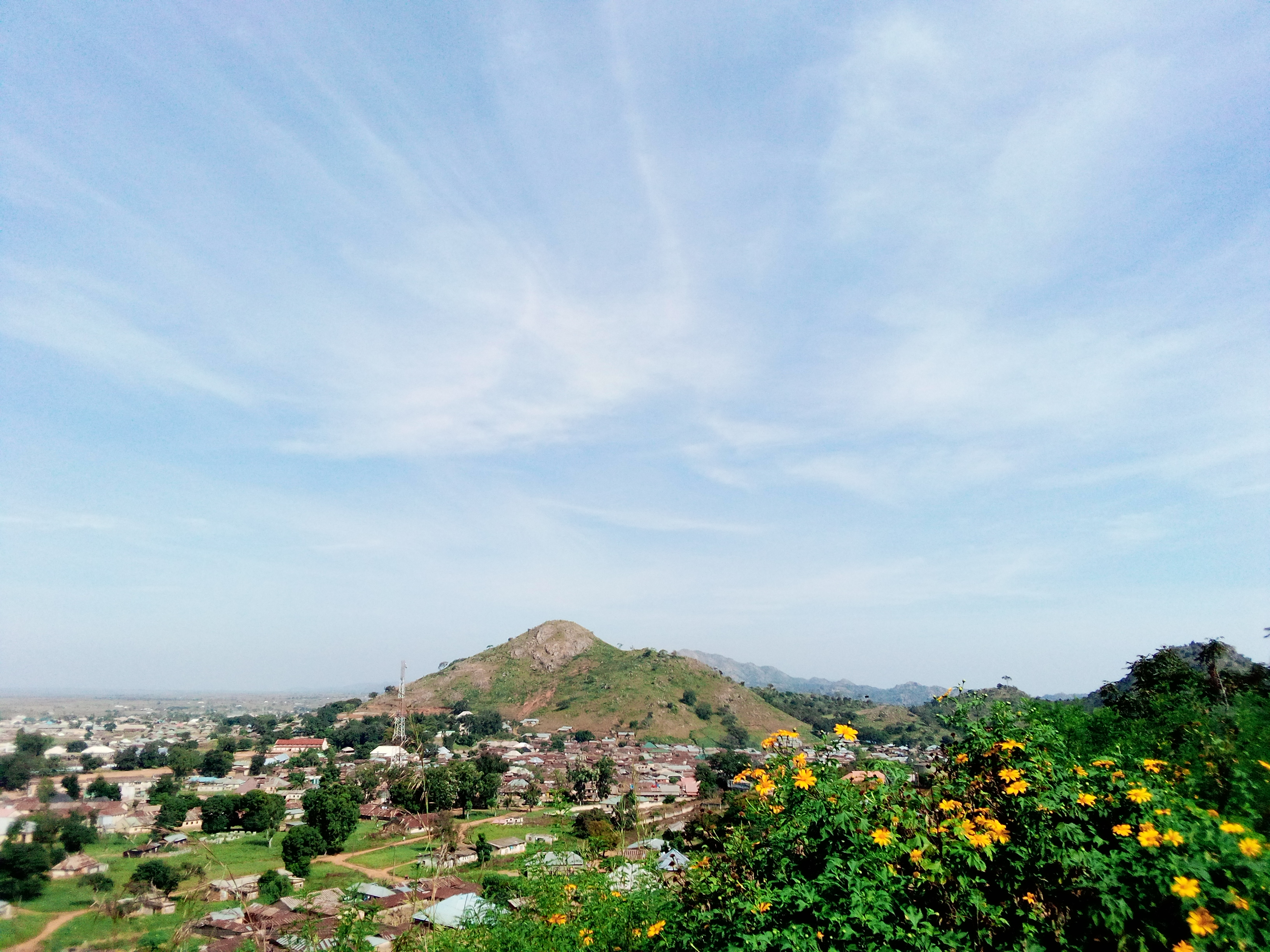

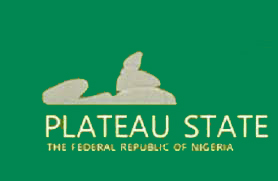
- Flag Logo
- Nicknames: Home of Peace and Tourism
- Location of Plateau State in Nigeria
- Coordinates: 9°10′N 9°45′E
- Country: Nigeria
- LGAs: 14
- Date created: 3 February 1976
- Capital: Jos

Government
  - Body: Government of Plateau State
  - Governor: Caleb Mutfwang (APC)
  - Deputy Governor: Josephine Piyo
  - Legislature: Plateau State House of Assembly
  - Senators: N: Pam Mwadkon Dachungyang (APC); C: Diket Plang (APC); S: Simon Lalong (APC)
  - Representatives: Ahmed Idris Wase (APC); Vincent Bulus Venman (APC); Ajang Alfred Iliya (APC); John Moenwul Dafaan (APC); Fom Dalyop Chollom (APC); David Ishaya Lalu (APC); Gagdi Adamu Yusuf (APC); Daniel Asama (LP)

Area
  - Total: 30,913 km^{2} (11,936 sq mi)
  - Rank: 12th of 36

Population (2006)
  - Total: 3,206,531
  - Estimate (2022): 4,717,300
  - Rank: 26th of 36
  - Density: 103.73/km^{2} (268.65/sq mi)
- Demonym: Plateaunian

GDP (PPP)
  - Year: 2021
  - Total: $9.69 billion 33rd of 36
  - Per capita: $2,014; 32nd of 36
- Time zone: UTC+01 (WAT)
- postal code: 930001
- ISO 3166 code: NG-PL
- HDI (2022): 0.563 medium · 22nd of 37
- Website: plateaustate.gov.ng

Plateau is a Nigerian state located in the North Central geopolitical zone. Its capital city is Jos. Officially nicknamed the "Home of Peace and Tourism", the state has a population of around 4.7 million people.

== Geography ==
=== Boundaries ===
Located between latitude 8°24' N and 10°30' N and longitude 8°32' E and 10°38' E, Plateau State encompasses a range of hills and rock formations of the eponymous Jos Plateau, where bare rocks scatter across grasslands. The state's altitude ranges from around 1,200 metres (3,900 ft) to a peak of 1,829 metres (6,001 ft) above sea level in the Shere Hills near Jos.

==== Adjacent states ====
- Bauchi State – to the north east for 360 km (224 miles),
- Kaduna State – to the north west
- Nasarawa State – to the south west for 219 km (136 miles)
- Taraba State – to the south east for 202 km (126 miles)

=== Climate ===
Although situated in the tropical zone, the higher altitude gives Plateau State a near-temperate climate, with an average temperature between 13 and 22 °C. Harmattan winds cause the coldest weather between December and February, with the warmest temperatures usually in the dry season months of March and April. The mean annual rainfall varies between 1,317 mm (52 in) in the southern part to 1,460 mm (57 in) on the plateau, with the highest rainfall during the wet season in July and August. The cooler climate has led to a reduced incidence of some tropical diseases such as malaria. The Jos Plateau is the source of many rivers in northern Nigeria, including the Kaduna, Gongola, Hadeja and Damaturu rivers.

=== Geology ===
Both Plateau State in general and the Jos Plateau in particular are thought to be formed on areas of younger granite intruding through an area of older granite rock. These younger granites, thought to be about 160 million years old, create the Jos Plateau's unusual scenery. There are numerous hillocks with gentle slopes emerging from the ground like mushrooms scattered with huge boulders. Volcanic activity 50 million years ago created numerous volcanoes and vast basaltic plateaus from lava flows, as well as regions of mainly narrow and deep valleys and pediments (surfaces made smooth by erosion) from rounded hills with sheer rock faces. Years of tin and columbite mining have left the state strewn with deep gorges and lakes.

== Tourism ==
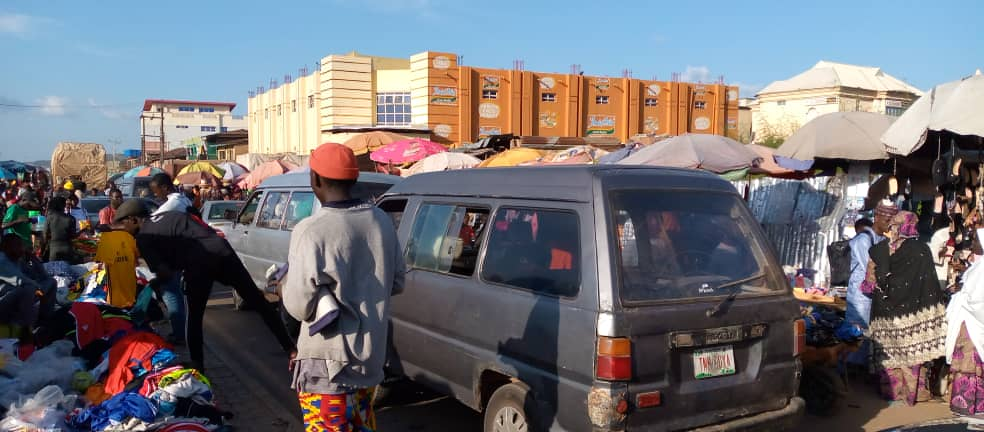
Terminus market

Plateau State is officially nicknamed The Home of Peace and Tourism. Although the tourism sector is not thriving due to perennial security issues and state government failure, its natural endowments are still attractions to tourists, mostly from within Nigeria.

- The Wildlife Safari Park
  Wildlife Park Jos
  sits in the middle of 8 km^{2} (3 sq mi) of unspoiled savanna bush, about 4 km (2 mi) from Jos.

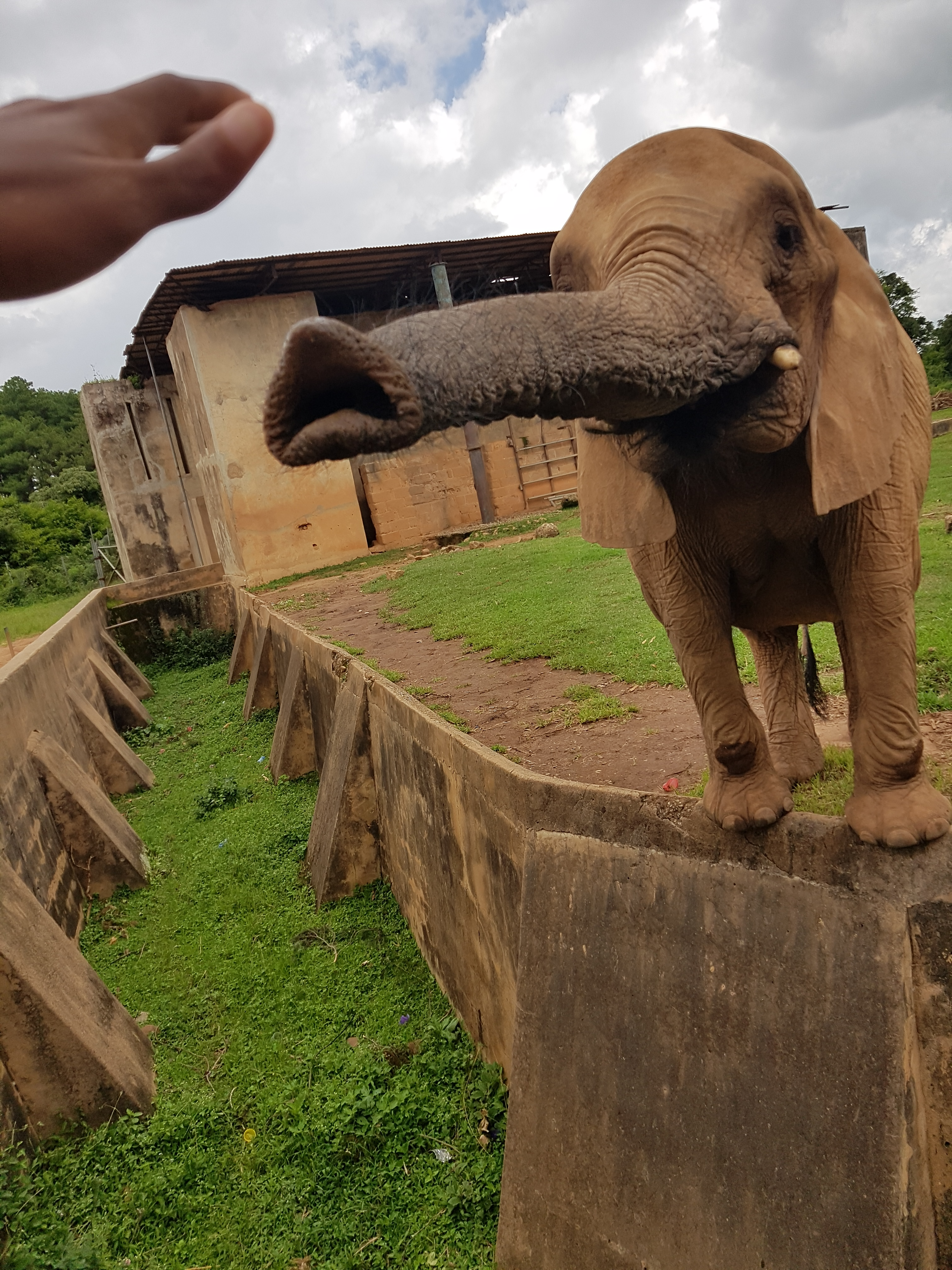
Elephant at Jos Wildlife Park

- The National Museum in Jos was founded in 1952. It is known for its archaeology and pottery collections, and with some fine Nok terracotta heads and artefacts dating from 500 BC to 200 AD.
- The Museum of Traditional Nigerian Architecture is adjacent, with life-size replicas various of buildings, from the walls of Kano to a Tiv village. Items from colonial times relating to the railway and tin mining are on display.
- Solomon Lar Amusement Park in Jos city
  Solomon Lar Amusement Park
  is named after Chief Solomon Lar, a former governor of Plateau State.
- Jos Zoo was established in 1957 and has a good stock of animals, birds and reptiles.
- Assop Falls is perhaps, the most notable of Nigeria's many waterfalls. Located at the edge of the Jos Plateau, about 64 kilometres (40 mi) from Jos city, on the road to Abuja. It is used as a filming location for soap operas and advertisements.
- Kurra Falls is a tourist area some 77 km southeast of Jos and is the location of the state's first hydroelectric power station.
- Wase Rock is a dome-shaped inselberg which juts out of the ground to a height of 450 metres (1,480 ft). It is located about 216 km southeast of Jos, near Wase town. It is one of only five breeding sites of the white pelican in Africa. Because of this, the government now protects about 130 hectares (321 acres) around the rock as a bird sanctuary and for wildlife development.
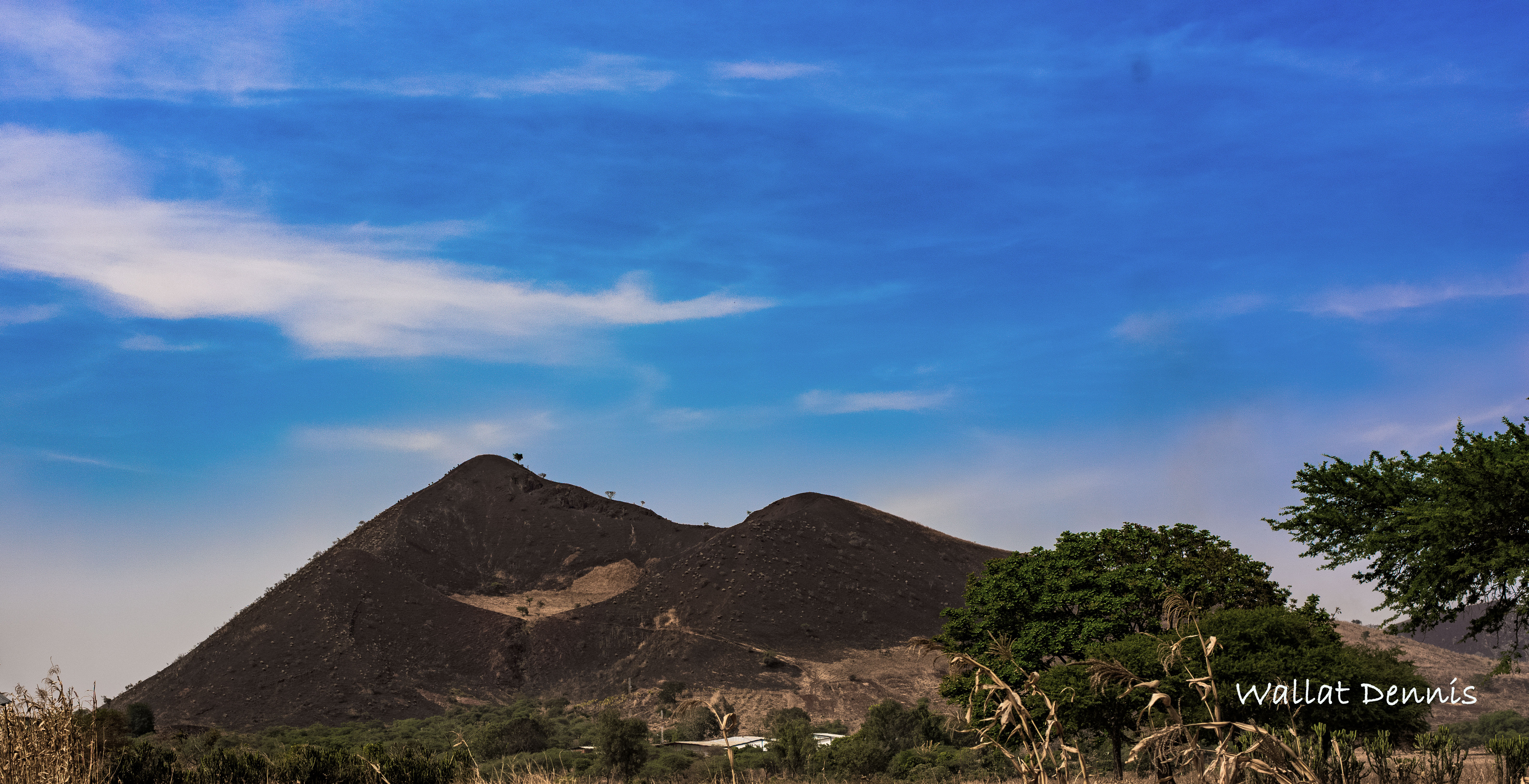
- Kerang Highlands
  The Kerang highlands are located about 88 km from Jos. These volcanic hills are the source of natural mountain springs, which are use for bottled spring water.
- The Shere Hills include some of the plateau's highest peaks. They are a range of hills to the east of Jos which have views of the city below and attract mountain climbers and hill walkers.
- Riyom Rock is a rock formation 25 km southwest of Jos, near Riyom town.
- Pandam Game Reserve is a largely unspoiled wildlife sanctuary with hippopotami, crocodiles, and several snake species. Park rangers track game on foot and guide the visitors.
- Kahwang Rock Formation of basalt rocks, is located in Bangai village in the Bachi district of Riyom.

== Natural resources ==
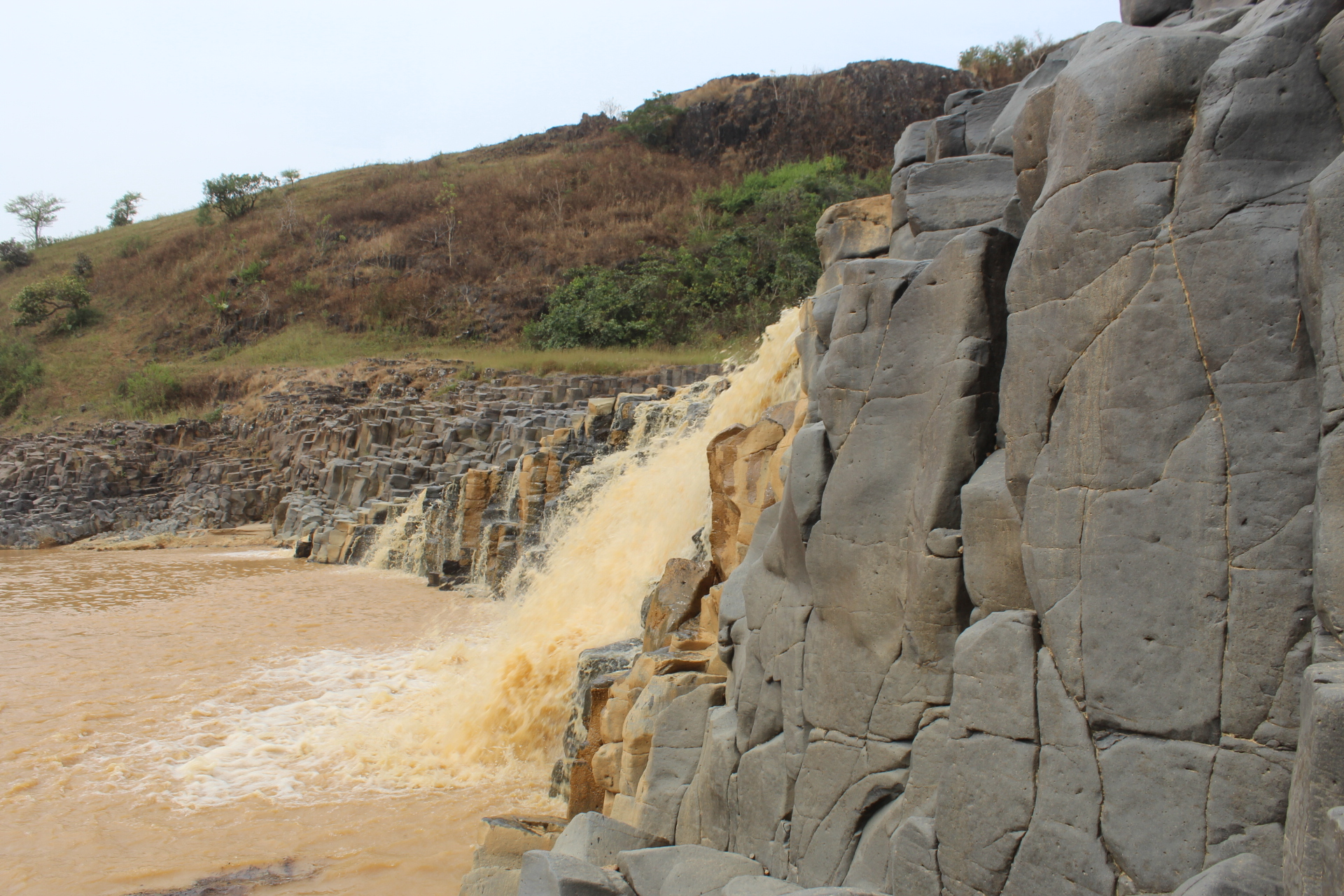
Basalt Rock Formation at Plateau State

Natural resources in the state include: barite, bauxite, bentonite, bismuth, cassiterite, clay, coal, emeralds, fluoride, granite, iron ore, kaolin, lead / zinc, marble, molybdenite, pyrochlore, salt, tantalite / columbite, and tin / wolfram.

== History ==
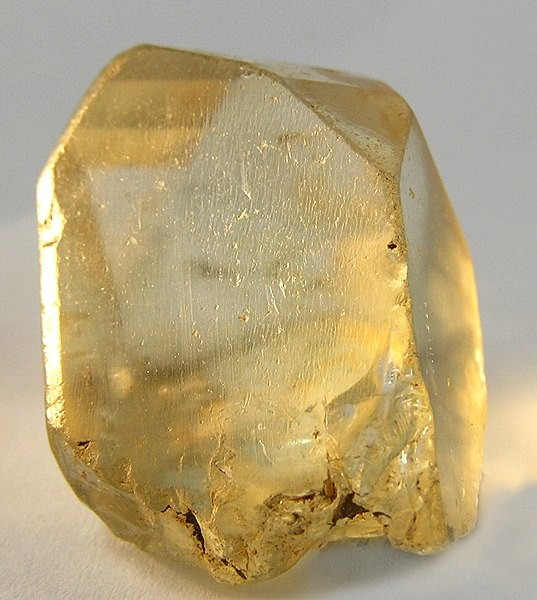
Topaz from the Jos Plateau in Plateau State

Plateau state has been adjusted to its present borders many times. Colonial manipulation was from a desire to protect the railway construction and guarantee safe passage of mined tin to the coast. There was also an attempt initially to create a province of largely non-Muslims under one Resident. Later alterations came from strong local desires for self-government.

The British began to exert colonial control of Nigeria in the early 20th century. At that time, much of Plateau State was part of Bauchi Province. In 1926, Plateau Province, made up of Jos and Pankshin Divisions, was carved out of Bauchi. The border changed several times in subsequent years as the government sought not to split ethnic groups. In May 1967, Benue and Plateau Provinces were merged to form the large Benue-Plateau State. At this time Nigeria had twelve states.

Following the civil war, Benue-Plateau State was one of several large states which were further split up following pressure on the federal government. Under the military administration of General Yakubu Gowon, the country was further divided into nineteen states in 1976 and Plateau State was created from Benue-Plateau covering the area of the original Plateau Province. In 1996, Plateau State was further subdivided to create Nasarawa State which was carved out of the western half of Plateau State by Sani Abacha's military regime.

Tin mining activities began in 1902 under the British and continue to the present day.

=== 21st century conflicts ===
During the 21st century, Plateau State has experienced significant violence, including riots, bombings, and clashes between different ethnic and religious groups. The region has seen conflicts involving various actors, including jihadist insurgents like Boko Haram, as well as tensions between Muslim Hausa-Fulani herders and predominantly Christian farmers, similar to other states in Nigeria's Middle Belt.

While some attacks have been attributed to Fulani herders, there have also been reports of violence by Christian militias and other local armed groups. In June 2018, ethnic violence in Jos resulted in the deaths of 86 people. According to Christian Solidarity Worldwide, 238 people were killed in a single weekend in June 2018, and 1,061 people lost their lives in the first three months of that year due to attacks linked to Fulani herders.

However, violence in the region is not one-sided. In recent years, Fulani communities have also suffered attacks, including incidents where armed groups have targeted Muslim herders and travelers on roads. Reports indicate that Christian-majority vigilantes and local militias have engaged in reprisal killings, further escalating tensions. For example, in January 2024, a senior military officer and several soldiers were killed in Plateau State in an attack linked to ongoing communal unrest.

While many portray the conflict through an ethnic and religious lens, analysts suggest that factors such as climate change, competition over land, and political instability also play significant roles. In 2022, a bandit gang attacked several villages, leading to significant casualties. More recently, in December 2023, at least 200 people died in a series of new attacks.

The ongoing violence in Plateau State underscores the complexity of the crisis, where multiple groups engage in attacks and retaliations, worsening instability in the region.

== Government ==
The Plateau State administrative structure consists of the state cabinet, the House of Assembly and local government areas.

The state government is run by the governor (chief executive), deputy governor, secretary to the state government, commissioners (cabinet members), special advisers, permanent secretaries, board chairmen and general managers. The current governor is Caleb Manasseh Mutfwang. He was sworn in on 29 May 2023 under the party PDP.

The House of Assembly consists of 25 members. The current Speaker of the house is Rt. Hon. Naanlong Daniel who was elected on 2 July 2025 by the members of the 10th assembly after former speaker Gabriel Dewan resigned.

The local government is headed by a chairman, who is the chief executive, while his cabinet consists of elected councilors who make up the legislative arm.

Plateau State is also divided into 17 local government areas, each encompassing ethnic groups who share common affinities or distant bloodlines. Leaders of these local government areas are elected by the people from amongst several contestants who may not be related to any past chiefdom leaders.

=== Local government areas ===
In 1976, Plateau State consisted of fourteen local government areas (LGAs). New LGAs were carved out of the large ones in 1989, 1991 and 1996, so that the new Plateau State is subdivided into the following seventeen LGAs:

- Barkin Ladi
- Bassa
- Bokkos
- Jos East
- Jos North
- Jos South
- Kanam
- Kanke
- Langtang North
- Langtang South
- Mangu
- Mikang
- Pankshin
- Qua'an Pan
- Riyom
- Shendam
- Wase

=== Religion ===
Plateau state residents are predominantly Christians.

The Roman Catholic Church includes 830,714 faithful in the Archdiocese of Jos (1934) with 60 parishes under Archbishop Matthew Ishaya Audu (2020), and two suffragan dioceses of Pankshin (2014) with 32 parishes under Bishop Michael Global Gokum (2014), and Shendam (2007) with 31 parishes under Bishop Philip Davou Dung (2016).

The Anglican Diocese of Jos (1980) within the Province of Jos, is led by Bishop Benjamin Kwashi (2008).

The Church of Christ in Nations (COCIN) has its headquarters in Jos North.

== Demographics ==
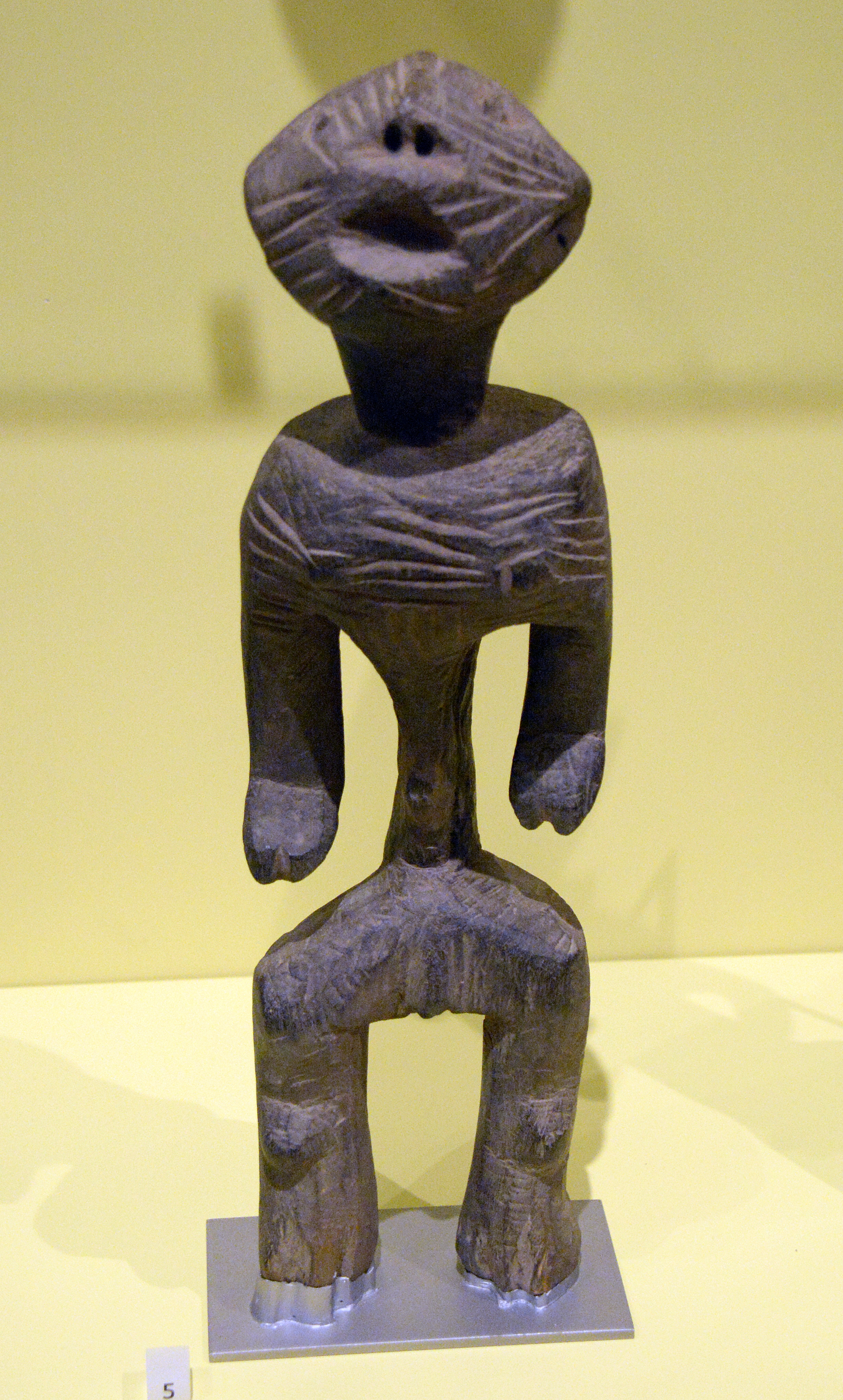
Male figure, Montol People, Nigeria, early 20th century. These figures were used by men's societies in healing rituals. It is currently kept in the National Museum Of Scotland, Edinburgh

The state has over forty ethno-linguistic groups. Some of the indigenous ethnic groups in the state are:

- Afizere
- Amo
- Anaguta
- Aten
- Atyap
- Bache
- Berom
- Bijim
- Bogghom
- Buji
- Fier
- Goemai
- Irigwe
- Jarawa
- Jipal
- Jukun
- Kadung
- Kofyar (comprising Doemak, Kwalla and Mernyang)
- Miship
- Montol
- Mupun
- Mushere
- Mwaghavul
- Ngas
- Piapung
- Pyem
- Ron-Kulere
- Talet
- Tarok
- Tiv
- Youm

These ethnic groups are predominantly farmers and have similar cultural and traditional ways of life. People from other parts of country have come to settle in the state; these include the Hausa, Idoma, Igbo, Yoruba, Ibibio, Annang, Efik, Ijaw, and Bini.

Each ethnic group has its own distinct language, but as with the rest of the country, English is the official language in the state. Hausa is also a common medium of communication and commerce as is the case in most parts of the state.

== Transport ==
=== Federal Highways ===
A3 highway (Nigeria) northeast from Kaduna State at Jenta via Makera, Bukuru and Jos to Bauchi State at Rafin Jaki

A236 highway (Nigeria) northwest from Jos as the Kakwonka-Tudun Wada Rd via Mista Ali and Jere to Kaduna State at Jengre as the Pambeguwa-Jengre Rd.

=== Other major roads ===
- south from A3 at Mararaba Jama'a via Ban, Heipang, and Kassa Hausawa, to Barakin Gangare.
- the Baarakin Ladi-Pankshin Rd east from Barakin Gangare via Doorowa, Soko Ca Futa, Mongu, Mangu, Duwop, and Vodni to Angwan Sarki.
- the Jos Rd continues southeast from Angwan Sarki via Duk, Gwolong, Kabwir, Amper and Rek to Langtang
- the Langtang-Zamko-Yelwa Rd south from Langtang via Zamerum and Zamko to Inshar.
- south from Inshar via Ajikemai, Yamini and Mato to Taraba State at Ikputu.
- the Amper-Bachumbi Rd west from Taraba State at Zurak via Zok, and Gaji to Bashar
- the Langtang-Wase-Bashar Rd south via Angwan Nasarawa and Yola to Wase,
- the Mavo Wase Rd east from Wase via Mavo Wase to Gwiwan Kpgi,
- the Lafia-Shandam Rd west from Inshar via Lonvel, Shendam, Pershiep, Shepwan, Der, Kurgwi, Kwande, Layi, Taram and Namu to Nasarawa State at Ungwan Mai,
- west from A3 at Makera via Kwakwi to Garuwa,
- the Jos Kafanchan Rd from Kaduna to Garuwa,
- the Kagoro-Dutsen Kato Rd north and east from Garuwa continuing the Jos-Kafanchan Rd as the Vom Rd to A3 at Bukuru.

=== Railways ===
The 1067 mm Cape Gauge Eastern Line north from Lafia in Nasarawa State via Jos to Bauchi State.

=== Airport ===
Yakubu Gowon Airport in Jos with flights to Abuja and Lagos.

== Education ==
Tertiary institutions in Plateau State include:

- College of Education, Gindiri, Mangu
- Federal College of Animal Health and Production Technology, Vom
- National Institute of Policy and Strategic Studies, Kuru
- Plateau State Polytechnic, Barkin Ladi
- Plateau State University, Bokkos
- University of Jos

== Sports ==
Association football is Plateau State's most popular sport. Prominent football clubs include Plateau United in the top-tier Nigeria Premier Football League and Mighty Jets F.C. in the second-tier Nigeria National League.

== Languages ==
Languages of Plateau State listed by LGA:

LGA	Languages
Barkin Ladi	Berom; Ron; Ibaas
Bassa	Amo; Buji; Cara; Anaguta; Izora; Janji; Jere; Kuce; Panawa; Rigwe; Sanga; Chokobo; Jere; Gus; Bache (Rukuba); Tarya; Lemoro;
Bokkos	Bo-Rukul; Duhwa; Hasha; Horom; Kulere; Mushere; Mundat; Nungu; Ron; Manguna (Shagau);
Jos East	Afizere; Duguza
Jos North	Afizere; Anaguta; Berom
Jos South	Berom
Kanam	Jhar; Boghom; Duguri; Ngas; Tarok; Yangkam; Saya
Langtang	Tarok
Langtang South	Tarok, Tiv
Mangu	Mwaghavul, Jipal, Pyem Chakfem, Bijim and Kadung
Mikang	Montol, Tarok, Youm
Kanke	Ngas; Jar, Mupun, Tarok
Pankshin	Fyer; Mhiship; Ngas; Jipal, Mupun; Pai; Sur; Tal; Tambas; Kadung; Bijim
Qua'an-pan	Kofyar (Pan:- Doemak; Kwagalak; Mernyang; Bwal, Doka; Teng), Ngas, Tiv
Riyom	Berom; Iten; Takad (Tyap)
Shendam	Boghom; Dass; Tiv; Goemai; Jorto; Koenoem; Miship; Tarok Montol;
Wase	Jukun, Boghom (Burmawa), Tarok, Tiv;
others	Ganang

== Notable people ==
- M.I Abaga – (born 1981), hip hop recording artist and record producer
- Dachung Musa Bagos
- Domkat Bali
- Edward Daniang Daleng
- Solomon Dalung – (born 1964), politician, lawyer and academic
- Joshua Chibi Dariye – (born 1957), former Governor of Plateau State
- Yusuf Adamu Gagdi
- Joseph Nanven Garba – (1943–2001), general, diplomat, and politician who served as president of the United Nations General Assembly
- Joseph Gomwalk – (1935–1976), police commissioner and first Military Governor of Benue-Plateau State
- Yakubu Gowon – (born 1934), Nigerian army general, former military leader and Head of State of Nigeria
- Jeremiah Gyang – (born 1981), singer-songwriter, instrumentalist and record producer
- Ruby Gyang
- Lois Ihwo
- Jesse Jagz
- Jonah David Jang
- Simon Lalong
- Solomon Lar
- Rimini Makama: Nigerian lawyer, entrepreneur, and the Communications Director at Africa Practice
- Angela Miri
- Caleb Manesseh Mutfwang – present Governor of Plateau State.
- Simon Davou Mwadkwon
- Panam Percy Paul
- Ice Prince
- John Nanzip Shagaya
- Pauline Tallen
- Jeremiah Useni:He was the former Minister of the Federal Capital Territory (1993–1998).
- Ahmed Idris Wase
- Muhammadu Abdullahi Wase

== See also ==
- List of radio stations in Plateau State Nigeria
