= Berom people =

Ethnic group in Plateau State, Nigeria

Berom
Total population
- over 1 million (2010)

Regions with significant populations
- Plateau State (Nigeria)

Languages
- Berom

Religion
- Christianity

Related ethnic groups
- Iguta, Aten, Afizere, Irigwe, Atyap, Bajju, Ham, Jukun and other Platoid peoples of the Middle Belt, Tiv, Igbo, Yoruba, Edo, Efik and other Benue-Congo peoples of southern Nigeria

The Berom (sometimes also spelt Birom) are one of the largest autochthonous ethnic groups in Plateau State Nigeria, covering about four local government areas, namely Riyom, Jos North, Jos South and Gwol (Barkin Ladi). Berom people are also found in some Local government areas in southern Kaduna State. Examples include Fadan Karshe, with Berom settlers tracing their origins to Za'ang a Berom district on the Jos Plateau. They emigrated during the British Colonial Government of Nigeria. The majority of the Berom are Christians. Statistics indicate that a large number of the population of Plateau State is made up of Berom people.

The Berom speak the Berom language, which belongs to the Plateau branch of Benue–Congo, a subfamily of the large Niger–Congo language family. It is not related to the Hausa language (which belongs to the Afro-Asiatic family) or other Afroasiatic languages of Plateau State, which are Chadic languages.

== Culture ==
The Berom people have a rich cultural heritage. They celebrate the Nzem Berom festival annually in March or April. Other festivals include Nzem Tou Chun (worongchun) and Wusal Berom. They are one of the major aborigine groups in Nigeria (Plateau State) that believes in the Judeo-Christian-Islamic God (Dagwi).

=== Festivals ===
Some Berom festivals include:

- Mandyɛng, in March/April - harvest festival
- Tyǐ, in August - red ochre collection festival
- Badù, in March/April - harvest festival
- Nshok, in March/April - harvest festival
- Worong cun, in April/May - planting festival, celebrated after good rains
- Búná/Vwana, in August - fonio harvest festival
- Mado, in October/November - hunting festival celebrated for prosperity. Che people also take part.
- Behwol, in February/March - hunting festival celebrated for prosperity. Che, Boze, Anaguta, inand Izere peoples also take part.
- Nzem Berom, in March/April - one-week Berom festival celebrating Berom cultural identity that was first celebrated in 1980 or 1981
- Wusal Berom, in November - Christian festival that was first celebrated in 1992

Festivals in Berom culture are primarily related to agriculture and hunting, which have been the main events revolving around Berom livelihood and cosmology. Agriculture-related festivals are typically cycled around different villages.

==== Nzem Berom ====
The influx of Christianity and western education paved way for many socio-cultural changes in Berom culture. In order to avoid the danger of losing the socio-cultural practice of the ancestor, and the overall precolonial activities such as the Mandyeng, Nshok, Worom Chun, Vwana, ceremonies were brought into a single umbrella festival called Nzem Berom. Nzem Berom is held within the first week of April, to coincide with the period when Mandyeng, Nshok and Badu Festival was held. The Nzem is a period when different cultural displays are exhibited from different parts of Berom land, especially in music, dance, arts and culture.

==== Mandyeng ====
Mandyeng is a major festival celebrated in Berom land to usher in the rainy season. The festivals normally take place in March/ April. In the past the Berom regard Mandyeng/Nshok (they are very similar) the most vital festivals which ensured a good farming and hunting period and harvest. Not all the Berom communities celebrate Mandyeng and Nshok. Those that perform 'Mandyeng' claim their roots from Riyom, they include; Vwang, Kuru, Za'ang, Gyel, Rim, Bachit, Bangai, Lwa, Sop, Jol, Wereng Kwi, Gwo, Kakuruk, Kuzeng, Kurak, Kuchin, Rahos and Tahoss. Nshok: Nshok slightly varies from Mandiyeng due to the fact that it also associates hunting with the rainy season farming. It is also held once a year around the months of April and May, to usher in the new season just as the Mandyeng.

=== Names ===
In the pre-colonial era the Berom regarded hunting as both an occupation and a sport. Although economically it was not as important as farming, hunting was regarded as a show of skill and bravery. So much so, that most Berom names are derived from game animals, most importantly duiker, due to their perceived beauty. Names such as Gyang, Pam, Dung, Davou, Chuwang, Badung etc. for boys are most common, while girls answer to Kaneng, Lyop, Chundung, Nvou, Kangyang. These are names for different species of duiker. Others, such as Bot (frog) Tok (fish), Tsok (toad) etc. are names for other animals that are non-domesticated, but not game. These names clearly typify how important game was in pre-colonial Berom society.

Nshok was not the only hunting festival in Berom land. Festivals such as Mado and Behwol existed but are not as important as Nshok.

=== Music ===
Some of the musical instruments among the Berom include:

- Yom Nshi: a two-string banjo made with calabash and skin as resonators
- Yom: a straw string instrument
- Kwag or Gwashak: a scraper made from dry cactus played with a stick slid across the sawed body of the dry cactus to produce a scraping sound
- Kundung: a xylophone made of cattle horns and cobwebs (image).

Berom musical instruments listed in Blench (2021):

- Idiophones
  - Xylophone (kundung or yom bi tok)
  - Vessel rattle
  - Ankle rattles, made from Borassus aethiopum leaves
  - Scraper, guiro (gwák or gwàshák) made from Euphorbia kamerunica (yěp)
- Membranophones
  - Barrel-drum (biŋ)
  - Gourd-drum, bing shi
  - Conical drum (rwey biŋ or bing gwom) reserved for royalty
  - Hourglass drum (kalangu)
- Chordophones
  - Raft-zither (yom kwo)
  - Arched harp (yom waya)
  - Trough-lute (yom shi)
- Aerophones
  - Flutes
    - Ju, single-note whistle ensemble
    - Ju shelo, fingerhole notch-flute
    - Unknown flute
  - Horns and trumpets
    - Transverse horn, bwo nyama
    - End-blown horn
    - End-blown trumpet

Berom dance equipment listed in Blench (2021):

- Shang, fibre buttock ornament
- Gadus or gawat, fly-whisk
- Bong, dance hat
- dance skirts

=== Food ===
The ancient Beroms primary food staple was chun (fonio) which even to this day remains a primary part of Berom diet. Tuk chun is served with any soup of choice; katai chun (rich soup of mostly wild vegetables) and bwirik chun (gruel). Maize grits are sometimes used as a substitute for chun in katai. As time went, the Beroms adopted pwana and ngai (millet) for gruel.

=== Clothing and Attire ===
The Berom people wear a green and maroon cloth. The green in the cloth stands for the Cacti and its significance in their culture. While the maroon stands for a local powder called tee. They rub tee on their forehead for protection and also rub it on their bodies for pain relief.

== Land and natural features ==
Berom ancestral lands are all located on high ground on the Jos plateau, which has undulating terrain. One prominent plant found in all Berom localities is ryep or cactus.

== Leadership ==
The Berom have a paramount ruler called the Gbong Gwom Jos. The traditional stool was created in 1935 by the British colonial administration of Northern Nigeria. Northern Nigeria was composed of completely different linguistic and cultural features between the ethnicities on the Plateau and the other groups. This ignorance of ethnic differences had initially encouraged the formation of vassal Hausa heads to oversee the created Jos Native Authority, which proved tumultuous with the Berom due to conflicting views and interests.

Through a circular; No. 24p/1916[JOS PROF NAK 473/1916], dated 15 August 1917, the Resident at Bauchi Province was instructed to send potentials from various native authorities including district and village heads to be elevated as chieftains by the Governor General. In response to the circular, the Resident wrote back to the secretary Northern Province Kaduna via a memo No. 24/1916 [JOSPROF NAK 473/1916] dated 27 October 1917, recommended a paramount ruler to superintend the native areas.

In the pre-colonial period, the Berom were divided into autonomous political groups based on regions, but the colonial authority merged them under the Gbong Gwom in 1952 to help coordinate the activities of the natives.

=== Leaders ===
The first chief Dachung Gyang of Riyom assumed leadership from 1935 to 1941. Under Dachung Gyang, the traditional institution was designated as the Berom Tribal Council composing of local chiefs within the Jos Native Authority. Its authority then only included mainly the Berom and excluded the chiefs of Buji, Naraguta, Jos and Bukuru. However, the government, in a Gazette of 7 February 1918, modified the list to include the Buji, Naraguta, Jos and Bukuru.

The emergence of Da Rwang Pam (1947 to his death on 14 July 1969 saw the elevation of the head of the Tribal Council to the stool of the Gbong Gwom Jos.

Since 1969, the stool has been occupied by the following:

- Da Dr. Fom Bot, 19 August 1969 to his death on 1 December 2002
- Da Victor Dung Pam, 17 April 2004 to 7 March 2009
- Da Jacob Gyang Buba, 1 April 2009 to the present

The former governors of Plateau State Michael Botmang and Jonah David Jang, are of Berom origin.

== Institutions ==
The Berom people are Christians; several aspects of Berom life and culture has been absorbed by Christian norms and ethics. Over 95% of Beroms are members of either COCIN or Roman Catholic and 2 of the institutions listed below i.e. BLTB and BOM are Christian institutions. There are also a significant number of Berom Christian songs that trend on the Plateau.

- Berom Educational and Cultural Organisation (BECO)
- Berom Youth Movement (BYM)

motto: Gasi ha yi bwei

- Berom Language and Translation Board (BLTB)
- Berom Outreach Ministries (BOM)

== Notable people ==
- John David Dungs†(Col.), soldier, statesman and Business magnate. Former Military Administrator of Delta State. CEO of H. F. Schroeder West Africa Limited and founder/CEO of Langfield Group Limited. A Prince of Riyom (scion of Da. Dung Jok, Gwom Rwei Riyom)
- Toma Tok Bot, first pastor of the Berom Church
- Sambo Daju†, physicist, educationist and public servant. Former Commissioner of Education; Lands and Survey Benue-Plateau State and first BECO president.
- D. B. Zang†, tin magnate, industrialist and elder statesman
- Sambo Bashi Gyel†, entrepreneur, politician and elder statesman
- Michael Botmang†, politician and first Berom Deputy Governor and Governor of Plateau State
- Lamba Gwom†(Cmdr.), Federal Minister of Transport and Federal Minister of Internal Affairs in the Cabinet of Ibrahim Babangida
- Peter Gyang Sha†(Maj. Gen.), soldier and former General Officer Commanding (1994–1998) 3rd Division of the Nigerian Army, Jos
- Jonah Jang, soldier and statesman, former Governor of Plateau State
- Lt Col James Yakubu Pam MFR b. 23rd Nov 1933 d.15 January 1966. Adjutant General of Nigerian Army. Killed in the abortive coup of Jan 15th 1966.Survived by Elizabeth Pam MFR (wife, deceased May 2011) and 6 children Kaneng Daze (entrepreneur), Jummai Sankey (Justice of the Supreme Court of Nigeria), Yusufu Pam (Frmr Attorney General Plateau State), Ishaku Pam FRCP (Consultant Physician and Clinical Director, Prof. Ishaya Pam (Frmr CMD Jos University Teaching Hospital) and Ibrahim Pam (World Bank)
- Dung Chong†(Maj. Gen), soldier and former director of intelligence Nigerian Army
- Philip Davou Dung Catholic Bishop of Shendam Diocese, appointment 5 November 2016
- P. D. Pwajok†, elder statesman and entrepreneur. Founder of P. D. Pwajok and sons enterprises
- Alexander Leonard-Marie Fom, physician and Berom Educational and Cultural Organisation (BECO) luminary.
- Dachollom Datiri (Rev), clergyman and former President Church of Christ in Nations (COCIN)
- Davou Zang, Senator of the Federal Republic of Nigeria in the 4th National Assembly.
- Sen Luka Gwom†, elder and renowned historian
- John Wash Pam† Senator of the Federal Republic of Nigeria and former Deputy President of the Nigerian Senate in the 2nd National Assembly
- James Vwi (MHR), politician and Honourable Member of the House of Representatives of Nigeria in the Third Nigerian Republic (5 December 1992 – 17 November 1993) representing Barkin Ladi constituency; member House committee on petroleum and mineral resources. Former national president Berom Youth Movement (BYM). During the 2006/2007 democratic to democratic transition, he broke ranks with the incumbent PDP and aligned with his townsman John Dungs.
- Kachollom Daju, Permanent Secretary Federal Ministry of Labour and Employment
- Barnabas Dusu†, Berom Language and Translation Board luminary that pioneered the translation of the Holy Bible to Berom language known as Bwok Basa Dagwi. The earlier version (New Testament) is known as Takada wuna sira pas
- Yakubu Pam (Rev), pastor; Executive Secretary Nigerian Christian Pilgrim Commission and formerly chairman Plateau chapter of the Christian Association of Nigeria and later CAN chairman North-Central geopolitical zone. Reverend Pam is also a member of the presidential council on CAN.
- Chris Bature, pastor and General Overseer Berom Outreach Ministries
- Yohanna Kwa†, mining engineer and inventor. Former Chief Executive Nigerian Mining Corporation
- Gyang Dalyop Dantong†, Senator of the Federal Republic of Nigeria in the 6th National Assembly and 7th National Assembly representing Plateau North senatorial constituency
- Gyang Pwajok†, Senator of the Federal Republic of Nigeria in the 7th National Assembly representing Plateau North senatorial constituency
- Daniel Sunday Dung, Member of the House of Representatives of Nigeria in the 4th National Assembly, Fourth Nigerian Republic representing Jos South/Jos East constituency
- Gabriel Y. Bwan Fom† Member of the House of Representatives of Nigeria in the 5th National Assembly representing Jos South/Jos East constituency
- Istifanus Gyang, Senator of the Federal Republic of Nigeria in the 9th National Assembly for Plateau North senatorial constituency and formerly MHR representing Barkin Ladi/Riyom constituency in the 8th National Assembly
- Pam Mwadkon Dachungyang, journalist and Senator of the Federal Republic of Nigeria in the 10th National Assembly for Plateau North senatorial constituency. Scion of the very first Gbong Gwom Jos, DaGwom Dachung Gyang , King of Riyom.
- Edward Pwajok, attorney (Senior Advocate of Nigeria) and Member of the House of Representatives of Nigeria in the 8th National Assembly representing Jos South/Jos East constituency
- Dachung Musa Bagos, Member of the House of Representatives of Nigeria in the 9th National Assembly representing Jos South/Jos East constituency
- Stephen Dalyop Pam, Honourable Justice of the Federal High Court of Nigeria
- Assistant Inspector General of Police Ezekiel Zang
- Sati Pam Dakwak†, former Head of Civil Service, Plateau State and elder statesman
- Davou S. B. Gyel, entrepreneur and Honourable Member of the House of Representatives during the Third Nigerian Republic representing Jos South constituency
- Victor Kwon†, attorney and former People's Democratic Party national legal adviser
- Gyang Dudu, customs officer and BECO President
- Yakubu Gyang Dakwak, attorney and former Chief Justice, Plateau State High Court of Justice
- Police Commissioner, Fom Pam Joseph
- Matthew Pwajok, Director and former Managing Director Nigerian Airspace Management Agency (NAMA)
- Rufus Bature, politician and former Member of the Plateau State House of Assembly, Secretary to the Government of Plateau State in Simon Lalong's administration and later state chairman of the All Progressives Congress (APC)
- Ezekiel Dalyop, public servant and former Head of Civil Service, Plateau State
- Sambo Choji, footballer
- Chris Giwa, football personality, philanthropist and owner of Giwa F.C.
- Daps Dalyop Gwom, gospel artiste
- Jeremiah Gyang singer and record producer
- Kenneth Gyang, filmographer
- Kevin Chuwang, Big Brother Africa Season 4 winner
- Ayuba Pam Dangwong, Veteran journalist with the nation newspaper and a former special adviser media and publicity to Governor Jang. Prominent for his stories and reports during the crisis and defendant of Berom nation his son Dr Alex Pam known for charitable works in his community
- Ambassador Yakubu Dadu, Nigerian diplomat and Consul General at the Consulate General of Nigeria, Frankfurt, Germany.
- Ezekiel W. Sambo, was a deaf educator and founder of Plateau School for the Deaf where he served as principal from 1977 to 1988. He served as a Senior Special Assistant to the Plateau State Governor (Chief Joshua Chibi Dariye) on Special Education. He was a graduate of Gallaudet University in Washington D.C. where he obtained a Bachelor's degree in History, and the University of Tennessee in Knoxville, where he obtained a Master's degree in Special Education. He died on January 27, 2011 after a brief illness at the age of 73. He received the Edward Miner Gallaudet Award posthumously in 2011, which is presented to any leader from around the world who has worked to promote the well-being of deaf people.
