= D. B. Zang =

Nigerian tin magnate and elder statesman (1927–2008)

Da loh D. B. Zang OON, CFR

Member of the Northern Nigeria House of Assembly
- In office 1963–1966

Plateau State Chairman of the Nigerian People's Party
- In office 1978–1983

Personal details
- Born: 7 October 1927 Gyel, British Nigeria (present-day Plateau State, Nigeria)
- Died: 29 May 2008 (aged 80) London, United Kingdom
- Party: Nigeria People's Party
- Spouse: Helen D. B. Zang amongst several others
- Children: Davou Zang, Ezekiel Zang amongst many others
- Occupation: miner; politician; business man (founder of D. B. Zang Limited)
- Wazirin Jos

Da loh D. B. Zang OON, CFR (7 October 1927–29 May 2008) was a Nigerian tin miner, entrepreneur and politician who lived at the height of the tin mining era in Jos, British Nigeria. He was a non-elected member of the Northern Nigeria House of Assembly. He was a founding member and he served as the Plateau State chairman of the Nigerian People's Party (NPP) and will go on to use his own personal wealth to fill the party's coffers when all state governments produced by his party were denied subvention by the central NPN government of President Shehu Shagari. In 1995, D. B. Zang became a member of the national board of the Petroleum Trust Fund (PTF). He also founded the Zang Commercial Secondary School Bukuru. He is famously remembered as a philanthropist, and father to Senator Davou Zang and Police AIG Ezekiel Zang amongst other prominent figures. Before his death in 2008, he held the traditional title of Wazirin Jos bestowed on him by His Royal Highness, Late Da. Dr. Fom Bot the Gbong Gwom Jos.

A renowned Berom elder statesman, he was said to have promoted harmonious and peaceful coexistence amongst all the ethnic groups of the state before his demise in 2008.

Following a glimpse of Zang, the following impression of the elder statesman was given:

His entry into the meeting hall at the headquarters of the Petroleum Trust Fund, PTF, was always on time; and as he entered, his carriage was dignified. Though he did nothing deliberate to remind you that he was that old warrior with all the scars inflicted on him by a life of hard work, sacrifice and the bearing of burdens, it always invariably showed. When he took his seat, he exuded effortless friendliness, bonhomie of the sincerest type, and he behaved with a disarming unpretentiousness that made you feel small and when he spoke, he did so plainly; because he always spoke with the artless candour of the innocent child. He didn't have had anything on his agenda except that good be done-wanting nothing for himself and having nothing to hide from others.

On 24 August 2024, Daily Trust tipped Zang as one of the few enterprising northerners capable of rescuing the region.
