= Berom =

Berom or Birom may refer to:

- Berom people
- Berom language
