= James Vwi =

Nigerian public servant and politician (born 1952)

The Honourable James Vwi (MHR)
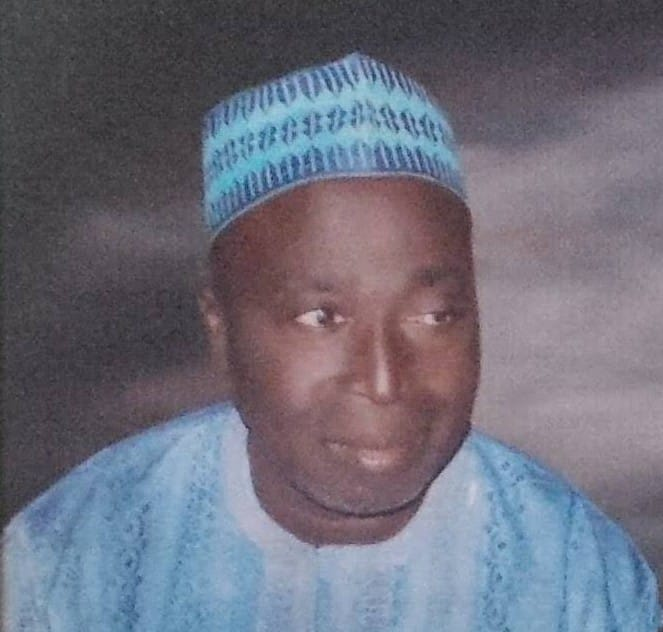

Member of the House of Representatives of Nigeria
- In office 5 December 1992 – 17 November 1993
- Preceded by: P. C. Deme (Second Republic)
- Succeeded by: Isa Chungwom Song (Fourth Republic) as member representing Barkin Ladi/Riyom constituency
- Constituency: Barkin Ladi

Personal details
- Born: 1 April 1952 (age 74) Riyom, British Nigeria (present-day Plateau State, Nigeria)
- Party: Social Democratic Party (1992–1993); United Nigeria Congress Party (1997); Peoples Democratic Party (1998–2015); All Progressives Congress (2015–present)
- Spouse: Naomi Chundung Vwi
- Children: 6
- Education: Ahmadu Bello University, Zaria (1986) – BPA University of Jos, Jos – LLB, LL.M Nigerian Law School, Bwari
- Occupation: public servant; politician
- Profession: lawyer
- former President of the Berom Youth Movement (BYM)

James Mwankon Vwi (// born 1 April 1952) is a Nigerian public servant and politician who served as a Member of the House of Representatives between 5 December 1992 and 17 November 1993 in Nigeria's short-lived Third Republic. He represented Barkin Ladi constituency (now Barkin Ladi/Riyom constituency) in the old Plateau State from which Nassarawa State was later carved on 1 October 1996. Following the inauguration of the Third House of Representatives on 5 December 1992, he was appointed to the House committee on petroleum and mineral resources. It was in the same legislature that Rabiu Musa Kwankwaso the Kano man of politics and Vice-Presidential candidate of the Nigeria Democratic Congress (NDC) served as Deputy Speaker. When the succeeding Sani Abacha military junta seized power from Ernest Shonekan's Interim National Government, all democratic structures of the Third Republic were dissolved the most prominent of which was the Third National Assembly sitting in Abuja. He then recessed from political life till the dawn of the Fourth Nigerian Republic in 1997 when he joined the United Nigeria Congress Party (UNCP) known mockingly at the time as the army's proxy.

== Early life and education ==
James Mwankon Vwi was born on 1 April 1952 to the family of Dara Vwi Mwangwong a farmer and De. Ngem Tu Vwi Mwangwong of Dabwam, Riyom in present-day Riyom Local Government Area of Plateau State. He attended the Riyom Elementary School where he obtained his First School Leaving Certificate (FSLC). He then proceeded to the state capital Jos in an ambitious drive to acquire business skills and save funds in order to further his education. After passing his GCE subjects, He enrolled in the Kaduna Polytechnic to study for a Higher National Diploma in Government and Politics. He then attended the Ahmadu Bello University, Zaria where he bagged his first degree, a Bachelor's in Public Administration (BPA) in the year 1986. Years after his tenure in the House of Representatives, he studied law in the University of Jos from the year 2002 to 2006 for a Bachelor of Laws degree (LLB Hons.) and was called to the Nigerian Bar in the year 2007. He will later attain a second degree; Master of Laws (LL.M) from the same institution making him an overall holder of three.

== Public service ==
James Vwi got his very first job in the Plateau State Civil Service and later moved his services to the Nigerian Mining Corporation. After serving as an administrator for six years, he decided to join active politics. According to Chris Anyanwu's compendium of Third Republic legislators The Law Makers, 1992 to 1996: Federal Republic of Nigeria second edition 1993 page 191, he resigned to join politics

because he believes he has the capacity to contribute his quota towards the development of Nigeria. He believes that if the development of the country is to be thorough it has to start from the policy making state.

== Politics ==
James Vwi served as the national president of the Berom Youth Movement (BYM) a Berom youth advocacy group. During this time he fostered ties and forged new links between all chapters of the movement nationwide and in the diaspora. At the dawn of the Third Nigerian Republic after a Constituent Assembly had finished final touches on a new constitution in early 1989, his people called on him to make a run for the House of Representatives seat for Barkin Ladi constituency on the platform of the Social Democratic Party (SDP). He was declared winner in the National Assembly (Senate and House of Representatives) elections held on 4 July 1992 with 25,800 votes defeating his only rival Reverend Gyang Pam of the National Republican Convention (NRC).

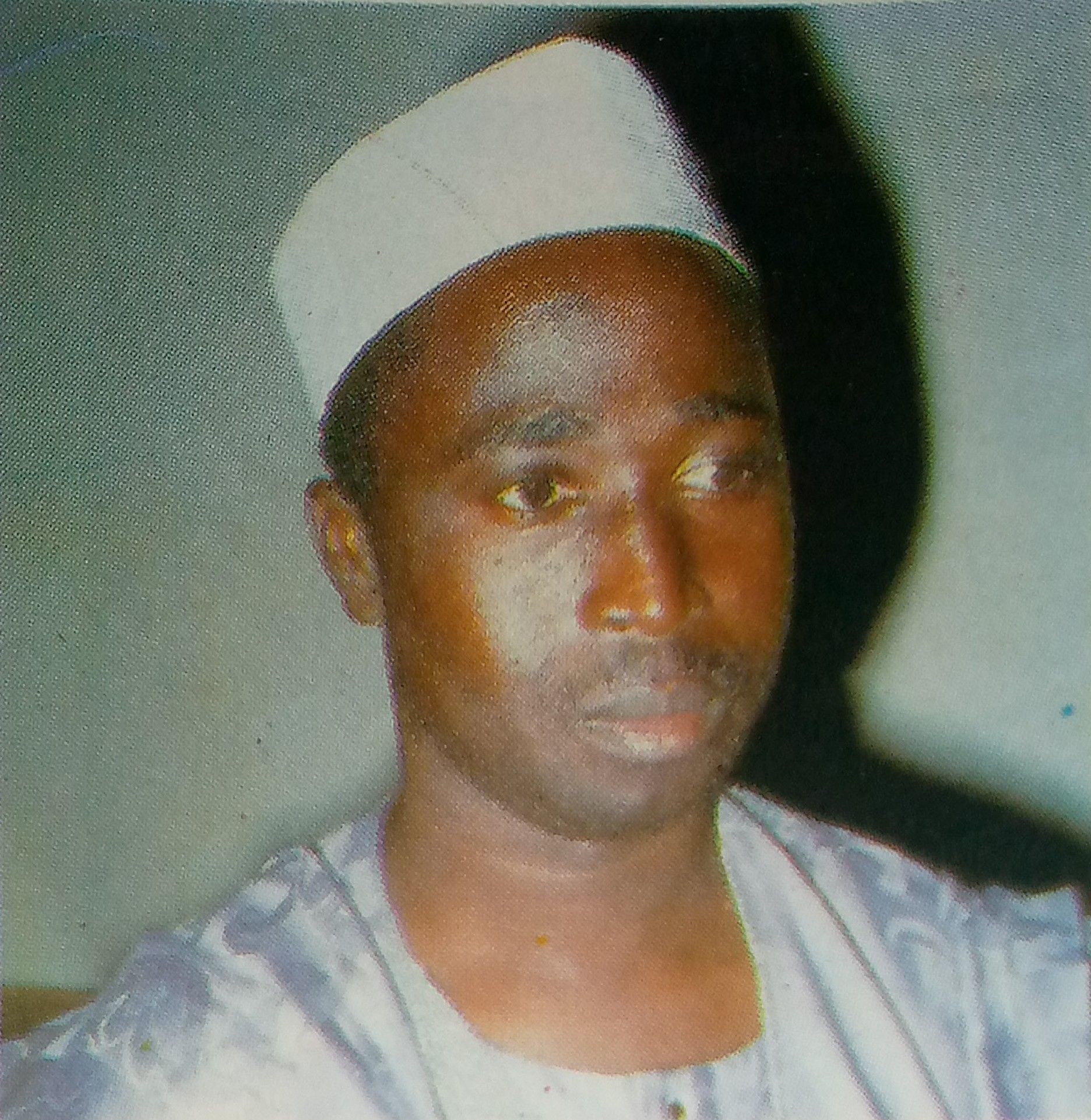
James Vwi during the Third House of Representatives in 1993

In 1997, Vwi joined the gubernatorial race for Plateau State on the platform of the newly formed government aligned United Nigeria Congress Party (UNCP) one of the five political parties formed after the proscription on all political activities was lifted by the Federal Military Government. The other four registered (government sanctioned) political parties being: the Democratic Party of Nigeria (DPN), the Congress for National Consensus (CNC), the Grassroots Democratic Movement (GDM) and the National Centre Party of Nigeria (NCPN). His ambition was dashed when the five parties were dissolved following Abacha's demise and new political parties (Peoples Democratic Party, All People's Party, Alliance for Democracy) formed in their stead by Abacha's successor Abdulsalami Abubakar. That ushered in a new political order that was generally more democratic than the previous era of five political parties.

At the advent of the Fourth Nigerian Republic that commenced on 29 May, 1999 James Vwi will resort to grassroots politics which would inevitably bring him very close to the views and sentiments of the peasant population of his native Riyom Local Government Area.

James Vwi issues strong denials that his Riyom branch of the Peoples Democratic Party had suspended the Minister of Sports, Damishi Sango from the party. He dismissed the purported suspension of the minister alongside 10 others as a ploy to have him fired from his job in the president's cabinet. The purported suspension was one of the highlights in the rift between Sango and the then-Executive Governor of Plateau State, Joshua Chibi Dariye.

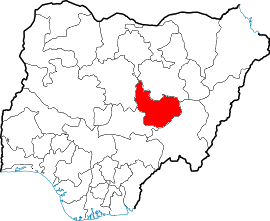
Plateau State in Nigeria

On 12 April 2003, The Honourable Vwi was the House of Representatives flag-bearer for the PDP in the National Assembly elections of that year. He lost to Gyang Dalyop Dantong of the ANPP.

He had a stint as a member of the board of directors of the Plateau Radio Television Corporation (PRTVC) Jos by appointment of His Excellency, Joshua Chibi Dariye, Governor of Plateau State.

On 2 August 2008, James Vwi implored all governors across the 36 states of the federation to not tamper with local government funds in order to pave way for the much desired accelerated development of the people at the grassroots. Shortly before taking office as Local Government Chairman Vwi, who at the time was the Council Secretary of Riyom Local Government, Plateau State, said that unless state governors hands-off local government funds, infrastructural development at the local government level would continue to suffer a severe setback, to the detriment of the common people.

By virtue of his past membership of the House of Representatives of Nigeria, James Vwi constituted part of the statutory delegates from Plateau State that attended and voted at the 8th All Progressives Congress (APC) National convention to elect members of her National Working Committee (NWC) held from 25 to 28 March 2026 at the Eagle Square, Abuja.

== Personal life ==
He is married to Naomi Chundung Vwi, a former Permanent Secretary in the Plateau State Civil Service. Together, they have six children.
