= John Dungs =

Nigerian soldier, statesman and industrialist (1952–2014)

His Excellency Colonel John Dungs Rtd (FSS, MSS, MNI)

Military Administrator of Delta State
- In office 22 August 1996 – 12 August 1998
- Preceded by: Ibrahim Kefas
- Succeeded by: Walter Feghabo

Acting Military Administrator of Oyo State
- In office 1994–1996

Personal details
- Born: 3 February 1952 Riyom, British Nigeria (present-day Plateau State), Nigeria
- Died: 2 May 2014 (aged 62) JUTH, Jos, Plateau State, Nigeria
- Party: Advanced Congress of Democrats (2006 to 2007) Peoples' Democratic Party (2007 to 2012) Democratic People's Party (2012 to 2014)
- Relations: Samuel Dung Jok Gwom Rwei Riyom (brother), Iliya Jok Dungs (brother) amongst others
- Children: Patton John Dungs and Simi Dungs DaVwi amongst others
- Education: Nigerian Military School, Zaria Nigerian Defence Academy, Kaduna Obafemi Awolowo University, Ile-Ife National Institute for Policy and Strategic Studies, Kuru
- Occupation: Soldier/Politician/Business magnate

Military service
- Allegiance: Nigeria
- Branch/service: Nigerian Army
- Years of service: 1973–1999
- Rank: Colonel
- Battles/wars: First Liberian Civil War
- Chairman/CEO of Langfield Group LTD Gwom Chomo Riyom

John David Dungs (//; 3 February 1952 - 2 May 2014) was a Nigerian Army colonel who served as Military Administrator of Delta State from August 1996 to August 1998, during the military regime of General Sani Abacha. He also served as Acting Military Administrator of Oyo State from 1994 to 1996. Following his compulsory retirement in June 1999 by the new civilian President Olusegun Obasanjo from the Nigerian Army alongside all military administrators at the time; predecessors of the civilian governors of the Fourth Nigerian Republic, Dungs went on to chair the boards of his businesses H. F. Schroeder West Africa Limited and the much larger Nigerian conglomerate Langfield Group LTD. He also played a brief and limited role in Plateau politics before his ultimate demise on 2 May 2014.

== Early life and education ==
John Dungs was born on 3 February 1952 to the royal family of Da Dung Jok (Gwom Rwei Riyom) of Riyom, Riyom District in present day Riyom Local Government Area of Plateau State where he obtained his primary school education. He attended the prestigious Nigerian Military School Zaria for his secondary school education from the year 1966 to 1970 and then enrolled in the Nigerian Defence Academy Kaduna from the year 1971 to 1973 when he graduated from the 13th Regular Combatant Course (13 RCC) and was commissioned second lieutenant. He then went on to acquire further education at the Obafemi Awolowo University, Ile-Ife where he qualified as an electronics and telecommunications engineer.

== Military service ==
John Dungs began his military career in the Nigerian Army Corps of Signals after receiving his presidential commission as a second lieutenant upon graduation from the Nigerian Defence Academy. He steadily rose through the commissioned ranks of the Nigerian Army reaching the rank of colonel, which he held whilst serving in the capacity of Military Administrator. In June 1999, all military political appointees of the immediate two erstwhile military regimes were forced to retire from service including J. D. Dungs.

=== First Liberian Civil War ===
In December 1989, the National Patriotic Front of Liberia (NPFL) led by Charles Taylor invaded Liberia from Ivory Coast to overthrow Doe, and gained control over most of Liberia within a year. By August 1990, Dungs was a member of the multinational force in Liberia when a gunboat was seized, capturing 27 rebels. The boat was transferring guns to Charles Taylor, the leader of the largest rebel group fighting to overthrow Liberian President Samuel K. Doe. As member of the West African peacekeeping contingent, Dungs acted as their spokesman, providing vital updates on activities of the largely Nigerian ECOMOG effort.

== Military Administrator ==
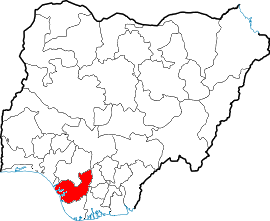
Delta State in Nigeria

Dungs served as the Military Administrator of Delta State when three local government areas were created in oil rich Warri by General Sani Abacha in October 1996 and oversaw the early management of the ensuing crisis between the Itsekiri and Ijaw ethnic groups over where Warri South Local Government Area will be headquartered. The newly created LGAs as announced by Col. J. D. Dungs were: Warri South (now called Warri South-West), Warri Central (now called Warri South) and Warri North. There was jubilation, singing, dancing and drinking in most Ijaw communities that accompanied the announcement. This for the Ijaw was political and economic self-determination and human empowerment achieved. The first Chairman of the LGA was an ethnic Ijaw named Couple Oromine, but since the relocation and re-relocation brouhaha commenced no Ijaw has headed the LGA to date.

During the crisis the Military Administrator sought to prevent tensions from escalating throughout the state, and also provided relief materials to internally displaced victims of the conflict. As relief flowed, Dungs engaged the leaders and elders of the warring groups in talks on how to bring the conflict to an end. Speaking on the allegation that his government was taking sides with one of the warring ethnic groups, Dungs had this to say:

government does not take any side. government tries to look at the problems from all angles and put them squarely, invite the various community leaders and dialogue over the issues so that eventually they can carry the message back to the communities and this essentially is what the government has been doing.

At the height of the conflict in 1997, Colonel John Dungs while meeting with leaders of the warring tribes at the Petroleum Training Institute Effurun near Warri said:

If we can inter-marrry, have children and then at this stage we continue to fight ourselves what type of generations are we going to build? I'm sure we will all love to leave generations that will be happy that when we transit to beyond our spirits when they come back will be happy that we left some legacy. But at the rate at which we have been going, I think the next generation might not forgive us for doing what we are doing now.

Visiting Koko an Itsekiri town in the aftermath of an attack by vandals, Dungs said:

It is unfortunate that our own brothers will do this type of thing at this stage of our development as a nation. We are supposed to be our brother's keepers. We are supposed to live as good neighbours. That is unfortunate the rate at which things are happening. Now government is taking steps to make sure that this problem is contained almost immediately. Actions are in progress. However these issues have been discussed at the highest level and directives have been given accordingly. And we are not going to let this type of thing continue. Government is making all efforts to stop it immediately. Government is going to enter into all the creeks to get this thing sorted out. This is not the best way to release one's anger or grievances. There are better ways one can follow to press down the point if he feels dissatisfied with anything but there are innocent lives here that have been lost for nothing.

In June 1997, Dungs appointed a commission of enquiry, headed by Justice Alhassan Idoko, to look into the immediate and remote causes of the crisis and make recommendations to the government. On inauguration, Colonel Dungs stated the commission's mandate as:

To examine the immediate and remote cause of the ethnic conflict in the month of March to April 1997 between the Ijaws and Itsekiris in Warri North, South and other local government areas.

Before his exit from office, Dungs appointed a panel to review the 1,147 contracts awarded by local government councils in the state. Before Delta State, Dungs had a stint as Acting Military Administrator of Oyo State from 1994 to 1996.

== Politics ==
Following his glorious days in the Nigerian Army Corps of Signals, his membership of the Nigerian ECOMOG peacekeeping contingent in the First Liberian Civil War and his stabilising role in the Niger-Delta as Military Administrator of Delta State, Dungs's career in politics that followed was less successful.

Dungs was a candidate in the Advanced Congress of Democrats 2006 governorship primary elections for Plateau State but lost to P. D. Gyang.

In April 2009, despite being a front runner and favourite of most Beroms due to his royal descent, Dungs was an unsuccessful contender to become traditional ruler of the Berom people (Gbong Gwom Jos) in Jos following a process marred by irregularities.

Jos – 19 October 2009, in a press interview John Dungs commended the initiative of President Umaru Musa Yar'Adua to offer the Niger-Delta militants amnesty on the condition that they lay down their arms and commit to rehabilitation and entry into normal life as responsible citizens of the society. He expressed optimism that militancy in the creeks was a thing of the past as it was no longer profitable for their sponsors to keep them there. In another development, he condemned the notion of a Berom agenda at play by the administration of governor Jonah Jang, arguing instead that the majority Berom ethnic group of the state happened to readily enjoy the fruits of governance due to the proximity of the Berom lands (Jos North, Jos South, Riyom and Barkin Ladi) to the state capital, that is Jos and Bukuru metropolis which is embedded within these four Local Governments.

In August 2012, Dungs emerged the senatorial standard bearer of the Democratic People's Party after a meeting with the party's national caucus led by Lieutenant General Jeremiah Useni and the state chapter of the party. He ran for the seat of Plateau North senatorial district which was left vacant after the death of Senator Gyang Dalyop Dantong and lost to Senator Gyang Pwajok of the Peoples' Democratic Party.

Besides his military background and political affiliations, Dungs is famously remembered as the founder and chief executive of Langfield Group Limited, a conglomerate with interests in various sectors of the economy. He was also the chairman and CEO of H. F. Schroeder West Africa Limited an electrical and mechanical engineering corporation headquartered in Lagos, Nigeria. As Military Administrator of Delta State, his influence was central in the creation of Riyom and Jos East Local Government Areas of his native Plateau State.

== Death ==
Dungs died on 2 May 2014 en route to a hospital after collapsing at his residence in Rayfield, Jos. His death came less than a week after the death of his father, Da. Dung Jok, the Gwom Rwei (district head) Riyom after a protracted illness. Following his passing, the executive governor of Delta State Emmanuel Uduaghan in a statement jointly eulogising Justice Chukwudifu Oputa and Dungs said that the former administrator was the architect of modern Delta whose zeal was relentless in laying the foundations of the achievements scored by successive civilian governors of the state.

== Military honours and decorations ==
- ECOMOG medal
- Meritorious Service Star (MSS)
- Forces Service Star (FSS)

== Legacy ==
=== Education ===
Dungs established the Christian Community Secondary School Riyom. Well equipped and electrified, the school has had the much desired impact of providing a day alternative to the boarding Government Secondary School (GSS) Riyom. It is situated in Danpyam, Riyom town.

=== Rural electrification ===
Dungs donated a transformer to a community in Sot, Gyel. Jos South Local Government Area of Plateau State.

=== Politics ===
Throughout his political life, Dungs never fully belonged to one political party for long, aligning with one party after the other as it suited the moment. Beginning with the Advanced Congress of Democrats (ACD) in 2006, then PDP, and then finally DPP when he broke ranks with the Jonah Jang led Plateau State PDP to run for the Plateau North senatorial bye-election following the death of Gyang Dantong.

=== Business ===
John Dungs established several businesses during his lifetime, including the Langfield Group Limited. In Delta State where he governed for two years, Dungs was conferred with a number of chieftaincy titles in recognition of his contribution to the political development and stability of the state.
