= Berom language =

Language spoken by the Berom people of Nigeria

Berom
- Birom
- Lêm Bèrom
- Native to: Nigeria
- Region: Plateau State
- Ethnicity: Berom people
- Native speakers: 1 million (2010)
- Language family: Niger–Congo?: Atlantic–Congo; Volta-Congo; Benue-Congo; Plateau; Beromic; Berom

Language codes
- ISO 639-3: bom
- Glottolog: bero1242

Berom
- Person: Wòrom
- People: Berom
- Language: Cèn Bèrom

Berom or Birom (Cèn Bèrom or Lêm Bèrom) is the most widely spoken Plateau language in Nigeria. The language is locally numerically important and is consistently spoken by Berom of all ages in rural areas. However, the Berom for the purpose of informal conversations with other Plateau tribes and commerce are shifting to the regional Hausa in cities. The small Cen and Nincut dialects may be separate languages. Approximately 1 million (2010) people speak in this language.

Berom is spoken in a large area extending from some precolonial settlements embedded within the Jos Metropolitan Area to the south of Jos city (Bukuru) to Barkin Ladi and Riyom in Plateau State, Nigeria. The Berom population distribution culminates in Foron, Barkin Ladi, Fan also in Barkin Ladi and at the edge of the Jos plateau in Sopp chiefdom of Riyom Local Government Area. Although native to the Jos Plateau, there are pockets of migrant settlers in Fadan Karshe town of Kaduna State that trace their origins to Za'ang District.

== History ==
The Berom have a link to the Nok culture, a civilization that existed between 200 BCE to 1000 CE. Generally, the Berom speakers are identified to live in the core Jos Plateau and down the low plains of Kaduna State.

== Dialects ==
The Berom dialectical differences are as follows:

- Gyel–Kuru–Vwang
- Du–Foron
- Fan–Ropp–Rim–Riyom–Heikpang
- Bachit
- Gashish
- Rahoss-Tahoss

== Phonology ==
=== Consonants ===
Eastern Berom consists of twenty-four consonant phonemes:

Consonants
		Labial	Alveolar	Palatal	Velar	Labio- velar	Glottal
Plosive	voiceless	p	t		k	kp	
Plosive	voiced	b	d		g	gb	
Affricate	voiceless		(ts)	tʃ			
Affricate	voiced			dʒ			
Fricative	voiceless	f	s	ʃ			h
Fricative	voiced	v	z				
Nasal		m	n	ɲ	ŋ		
Rhotic			r				
Approximant			l	j		w	

- /ts/ occurs in the Foron dialect.
- /p/ /b/, /m/ are bilabial, while /f/ and /v/ are labiodental.
- /tʃ/, /dʒ/, and /ʃ/ are palato-alveolar, while /ɲ/ and /j/ are palatal.

In Berom, approximants are found in the last position, for example, orthographic rou is /ròw/ and vei is /vèj/.

=== Vowels ===
This language consists of seven vowel phonemes:

Vowels
	Front	Central	Back
Close	i		u
Close-mid	e		o
Open-mid	ɛ		ɔ
Open		a	

Berom consists of three type of tones and four glide tones. The glide tones are treated here as rising and falling tones. The tones are as follows:

- /tút / 'to climb' – high tone
- /shɛl/ 'small' – mid tone
- /bàsa/ 'to teach, read' – low tone
- /nepâs/ 'new' – falling tone
- /sǎn/ 'empty' – rising tone

== Orthography ==
Berom orthography:

a, b, c, d, e, ɛ, f, g, gb, h, i, j, k, kp, l, m, n, ng, o, ɔ, p, r, s, sh, t, ts, u, v, w, y, z
