= Victor Pam =

Nigerian police officer and monarch; 4th Gbong Gwom Jos (1936–2009)

Da. Victor Pam DIG Rtd
- 4th Gbong Gwom Jos

Gbong Gwom
- Reign: 1 April 2004 to 7 March 2009 (~5 years)
- Coronation: Accession on 1 April 2004 Official presentation of staff of office by His Excellency, Joshua Dariye on 17 April 2004
- Predecessor: Fom Bot
- Successor: Jacob Gyang Buba
- Born: Victor Dung Pam; 4 March 1936; Nyango-Gyel, British Nigeria (present-day Plateau State, Nigeria)
- Died: 7 March 2009 (aged 73); JUTH, Jos
- Burial: 29 March 2009; Gbong Gwom Jos Palace, Jos.
- Spouse: Edith Pam
- House: selected through election by the kingmakers (Jos Joint Traditional Council) and approved by the Government of Plateau State
- Religion: Christianity
- Occupation: Police officer/ Traditional Ruler

Da. Victor Dung Pam DIG Rtd (4 March 1936 – 7 March 2009) was a Nigerian police officer, elder statesman and monarch who was the 4th Gbong Gwom Jos reigning from his accession on 1 April 2004 (two years after the demise of his predecessor Fom Bot) to his death on 7 March 2009. He was criwned on 17 April 2004 and presented with his official staff of office by His Excellency, Governor Joshua Dariye. He had previously attained the rank of Deputy Inspector General (DIG) in the Nigeria Police Force before his retirement. A highly patriotic father of his people, he is famously remembered as having taken drastic measures to curb the consumption of the illicit gin 'goskolo' amongst Berom youths. His almost 5-year brief reign was remarkable and saw him encourage all Berom families especially in the rural areas to send their children to school.
