= Gbong Gwom Jos =

Nigerian monarchical institution since 1935

Gbong Gwom of Jos

Incumbent
- Jacob Gyang Buba since 1 August 2009

Details
- Style: His Royal Highness, His Majesty
- First monarch: Dachung Gyang as Gwom, Gbong Duk Shot (King of the Berom Central Tribal Court); Dagwom Riyom; Gwom Kwallak by appointment of David Macdonald Herbert Beck, Resident of the British Colonial Government for Plateau Province on 11 December, 1935
- Formation: 22 February 1936, Berom Central Tribal Court, Riyom, British Nigeria
- Residence: Jishe, Jos
- Appointer: selected through election by the kingmakers (Jos Joint Traditional Council) and approved by the Government of Plateau State

Jos Vwel Berom Jos–Bukuru Metropolis
- Metropolitan
- Jos Joint Traditional Council
- Location in Nigeria
- Coordinates: 09°55′00″N 08°53′25″E
- Country: Nigeria
- State: Plateau State
- Time zone: GMT+1

The Gbong Gwom Jos stool (// est. 1935 – present) is a traditional royal institution in the Middle Belt region of Nigeria, that reigns over the Berom tribe of Jos and Greater Jos (Riyom, Barkin-Ladi, Jos North and Jos South) + parts of Southern Kaduna in what is a collective traditional government called the Jos Joint Traditional Council of Chiefs (high chiefs of the Berom Quartet namely: Barkin-Ladi, Jos North, Jos South and Riyom) of which the Gbong Gwom is president. Gbong Gwom Jos is Berom for 'Most Eminent King of Jos'. It was preceded by the Gwom Gbong Duk Shot in Kwallak, Riyom anglicised as 'King of The Central Tribal Court', the original royal court of the Berom tribe and other native peoples of Jos which was crafted under the auspices of the Government of British Colonial Nigeria (Plateau Province) and presided over by DaGwom Dachung Gyang, King of Riyom since 1935. The Berom Central Tribal Court was ratified in 1936. By 1947 the Gwom Gbong Duk Shot stool became vacant, and Rwang Pam a teacher, with the help of the colonial government moved the stool to the more central and less extreme location of Jos and renamed it Sarkin Jos (Hausa for King of Jos) albeit very temporarily. Besides governing the Jos Joint Traditional Council, the occupant of the stool and bearer of the title also doubles as the Chairman of the Plateau State Traditional Council of Chiefs. The Gbong Gwom Jos is the embodiment of a unique blend of royalty and the collective tradition of the Berom peoples. Though embedded in the geographic north of Nigeria, it differs from neighbouring royal institutions that are mostly Islamic emirates and vassal states of the Sokoto Caliphate such as Bauchi, Zazzau, Lafia, Bida and Ilorin. From 1935 till date, Fom Bot holds the record of the longest reigning occupant of the Gbong Gwom Jos stool reigning from his accession on 26 August 1969 to his death on 1 December 2002 (33 years).

== Creation and first monarch (Dachung Gyang) ==
According to legend, the origin of all the Berom peoples is Riyom and the rest of the districts of the tribe still felt a deeply rooted connection to the Riyom homeland. It is therefore understandable that the kingship of the Berom peoples was birthed in Riyom where Gwom Kwallak, Riyom Dachung Gyang required the remaining Berom district heads and chiefs of the rest of the smaller tribes (Afizere, Anaguta, Irigwe, Rukuba & the Pengana peoples) of what was collectively coined the Jos Native Authority to pay him court as early as 1935. Following his bestowment with kingship authority, his court gained official recognition by the Plateau Provincial Colonial Government on 22 February 1936.

The Gbong Gwom Jos succession does not follow the usual dynastic succession laws of the monarchies of antiquity around the world but a democratic process as determined by the king makers of Jos (Be Gwom Rwei) as such no Gbong Gwom since 1935 has ever been succeeded by a biological heir. The process is thus heavily sanctioned and influenced by the incumbent Governor of Plateau State at the time of passing of any given occupant of the throne especially if the said governor is of Berom ethnicity. Throughout its history, the Gbong Gwom Jos monarchy has experienced two interregna between the reign of Dachung Gyang and Rwang Pam (1941–1947) and between the reign of Fom Bot and Victor Pam (2002–2004) the second being characterised by disputes in the succession process.

=== 1st interregnum (1941–1947) ===
       _____________

=== Rwang Pam (1947–1969) ===
His Royal Highness Rwang Pam succeeded His Royal Highness Dachung Gyang in 1947 by appointment of Charles Keith Wreford, the acting resident for Plateau Province at the time. His reign brought with it three changes; The regalia (the turban was introduced) imitating the Hausa-Fulani emirs, the seat of the Native Authority (moved to Jos township) and the name of the institution (to Sarkin Jos). His reign was marked by a number of important changes including the transition from colonial rule to self government of the Nigerian state. The Rwang Pam Stadium of Jos Township is named in his honour.

=== Fom Bot (1969–2002) ===
At the coronation of His Royal Highness Fom Bot on 20 March 1970, the Gbong Gwom Jos (then still Sarkin Jos) monarchical institution was elevated to first class by His Excellency, Joseph Dechi Gomwalk, Military Governor of Benue-Plateau State. Later during the reign of Fom Bot the throne, at the initiative of His Excellency, Solomon Daushep Lar, first Civilian Governor of Plateau State was renamed Gbong Gwom Jos. The shrewd statesman at the time felt it inappropriate that the traditional institutions of the state were named using the Hausa language thus the Government of Plateau State required all traditional institutions to be renamed and named only in their native languages. Dr. Fom Bot will go on to maintain the use of the turban regalia style bequeathed him by his predecessor to the seething of his tribesmen.

=== 2nd Interregnum (2002–2004) ===
       _____________

=== Victor Pam (2004–2009) ===
The brief reign of His Majesty, Victor Pam (2004–2009) was characterised by his radical patriotism and the urging of the Berom peoples to a return to the soul and glorious identity of the tribe. He totally departed from the turban style regalia used by his immediate past two predecessors, promoted basic education and began to rally all Berom community heads round the fight against the vice of drunkenness and alcoholism. In doing these, the royal father matched his words with actions and led by example. His reign was thus very brief yet reformative of the monarchy.

Following the death of His Royal Highness Fom Bot, in 2003 renowned historian of the Berom people and the then BECO (Berom Education and Cultural Organisation) president Sen Luka Gwom Zangabat cautioned his fellow tribesmen to desist from portraying divergent views on the succession process to fill in the vacant throne.

=== Jacob Gyang Buba (2009–present) ===
The process of selection for the successor of His Majesty Victor Pam was pretty quick and easy owing to the lessons of the recent past. Beginning with quite a long list of candidates vying for the vacant throne, the contest eventually narrowed to two candidates in the persons of John David Dungs former military administrator of Delta State and Jacob Gyang Buba, former customs boss and the incumbent monarch. Being the choicest of the kingmakers and incumbent governor at the time, Buba emerged winner of the process and was coronated and presented with his staff of office on 1st August, 2009.

== List (Be Gbong Gwom Jos) ==
- Dachung Gyang (1935–1941)
- Rwang Pam (1947–1969)
- Fom Bot (1969–2002)
- Victor Pam (2004–2009)
- Jacob Gyang Buba (incumbent since 1 August 2009)
