= Sambo Daju =

Nigerian physicist and administrator (1938–1986)

Dr Sambo Daju

Commissioner of Lands and Survey of Plateau State
- In office 1979–1986

Federal Civil Service Commissioner
- In office 1975–1979

Commissioner of Education of Benue-Plateau State
- In office 1973–1975

Personal details
- Born: 15 August 1938 Riyom, British Nigeria (present-day Plateau State, Nigeria)
- Died: 19 January 1986
- Spouse: Chundung Lucy Sambo-Daju
- Children: 5
- Education: University of St. Andrews, Scotland BSc.(Hons.) University of Bristol, England PhD
- Occupation: Administrator; Lecturer
- Profession: Physicist

Sambo Daju (15 August 1938 – 19 January 1986) was a Nigerian physicist, administrator and educationist who served as one of the Commissioners of the Federal Civil Service Commission of Nigeria from 1975 to 1979. He had previously served as a lecturer in the department of physics Ahmadu Bello University, Zaria from 1969 to 1972. He again served as lecturer in the department of physics of the College of Science and Technology Port-Harcourt from 1973 to 1975 when he was appointed commissioner of education of Benue-Plateau State. He was again appointed commissioner of lands and survey of Plateau State in 1979 after his Federal Civil Service Commission appointment.

== Birth and educational background ==
Sambo Daju was born on 15 August 1938 in Riyom, Riyom district in the then British Nigeria. He obtained his primary education from 1945 to 1949 in Riyom and Pankshin. He then enrolled in Government College Keffi for his secondary education and graduated in 1956. From 1958 to 1960 he attended the Nigerian College of Arts, Science and Technology where he graduated with advanced 'A' level papers in Physics, Mathematics and Applied Mathematics. In 1960 for his undergraduate studies, Daju attended the University of St. Andrews, Scotland where he earned a bachelor's degree BSc. (Hons.) in Physics. In 1968 he earned his doctorate degree (PhD) in X-ray astronomy from the University of Bristol, England. He then returned home to work a career in the public service of Benue-Plateau State, the Federal Civil Service Commission of Nigeria and Plateau State each time serving as commissioner.

== Elder statesman ==
Sambo Daju served as a prominent elder statesman of his people, the Beroms, having been one of the few Nigerians who had a doctorate at the time. With the patronage of Da. Dr. Fom Bot, Daju became the first president of the Berom Educational and Cultural Organisation (BECO).
