= Ropp, Nigeria =

Ropp
- Village
- Location within Nigeria
- Coordinates: 09°30′05″N 08°55′40″E
- Country: Nigeria
- State: Plateau State
- LGA: Barkin Ladi
- Time zone: UTC+01:00 (WAT)
- Postal code: 932
- Climate: Aw

Ropp is a village Barkin Ladi Local Government Area, Plateau State, Middle Belt, Nigeria. It is located 47.63 km (29.60 mi) from the state capital, Jos. The postal code of the area is 932.

== See also ==
- List of villages in Plateau State
