= Assop Waterfalls =

Waterfall in Nigeria

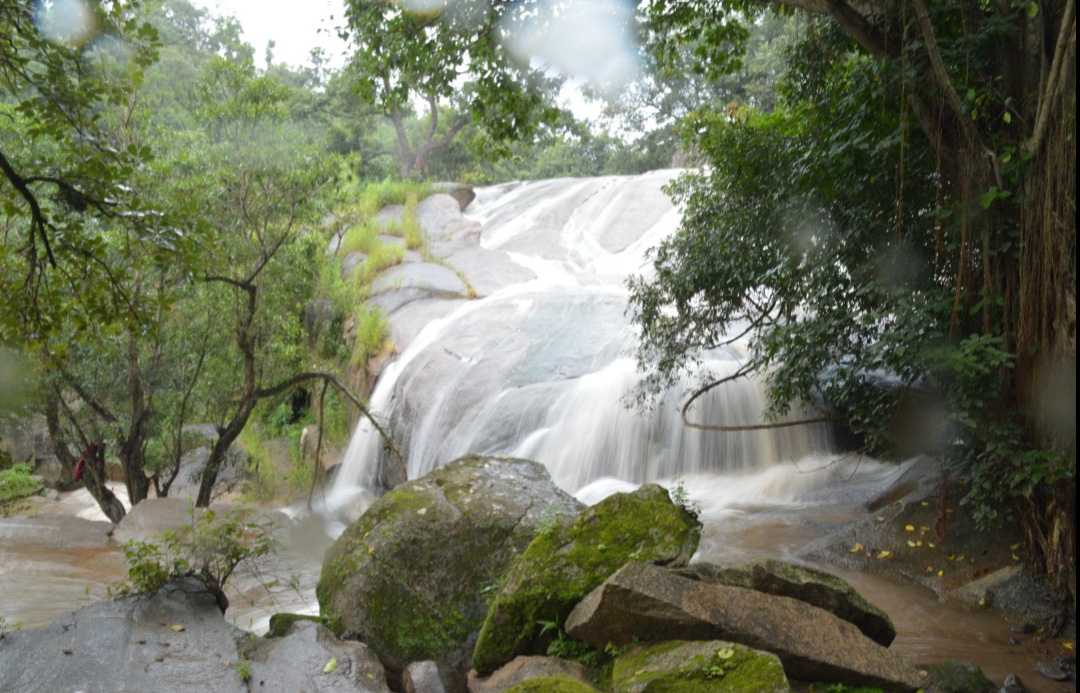

- Location within Nigeria
- Location: Riyom, Niger State, Nigeria
- Coordinates: 9°31′05″N 8°37′21″E
- Type: Segmented
- Total height: 30 m (98 ft)
- Watercourse: 200 m (656 ft)

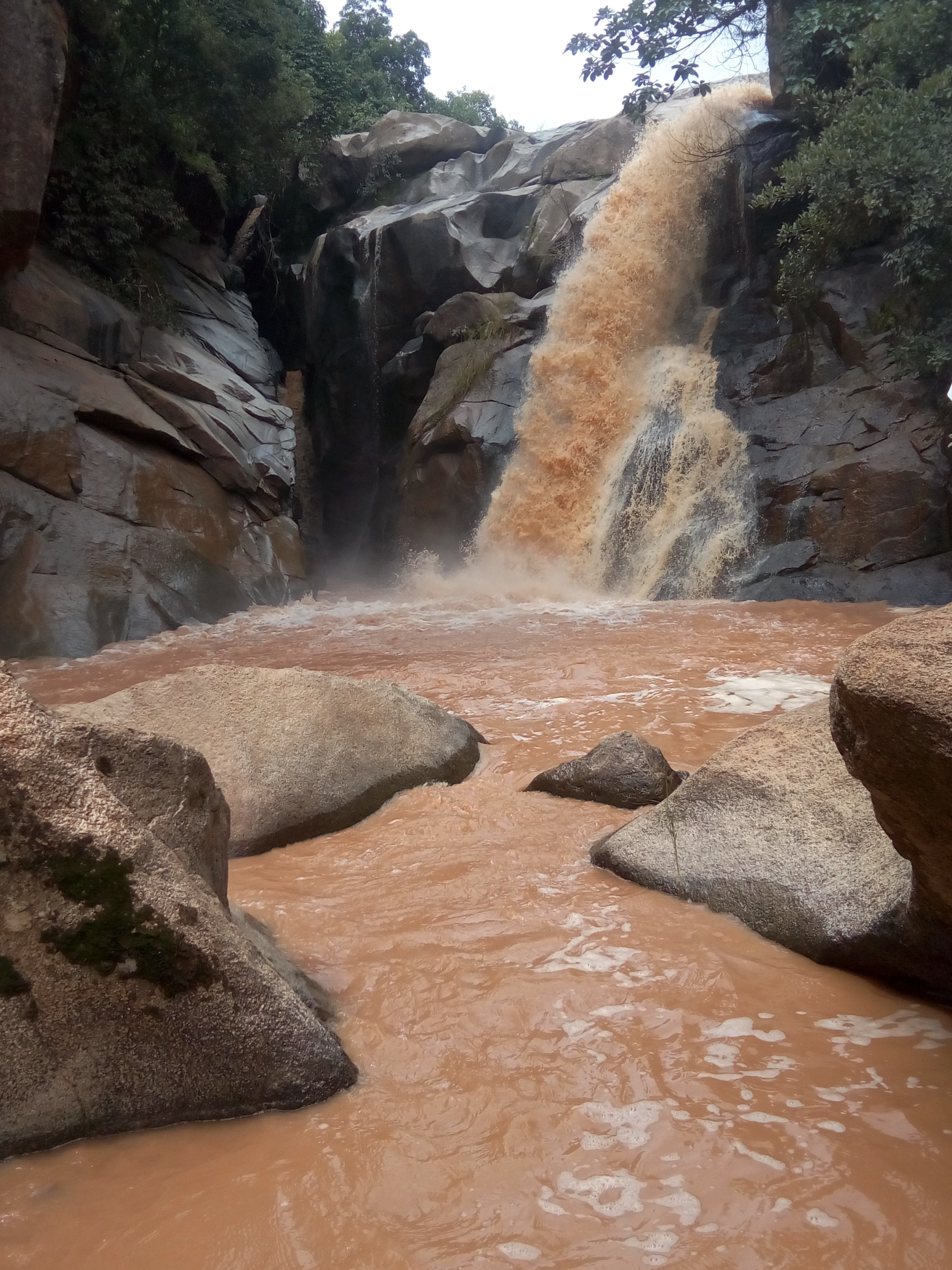
Assop Waterfall

Assop Waterfalls or Assop Fall is a waterfall located in Plateau State, Nigeria, along the Jos-Kagoro Road approximately 64 kilometres southeast of Jos. The waterfall is formed by the Assop River, a tributary within the Benue River basin and is one of the notable natural attracted on the Jos Plateau.

== Location and physical features ==
Assop Falls is situated near Hawan Kobo a scenic escarpment on the Jos Plateau. The waterfall consist of water cascading over rocky formation into a pool below surrounded by savannah vegetation and patches of gallery forest. The area experiences the relatively cool climate characteristic of the Jos Plateau region.

== Tourism ==
The waterfall is a popular tourist destination in Plateau State and is frequently visited by travelers, nature enthusiasts, and sightseers. Its location along a major roadway makes it accessible to visitors' Recreational activities at the site include sightseeing, photography, picnic, and nature walks. Assop Falls has also been used a filming location for television production and other media projects because of its distinctive landscape.

== Conservation and development ==
In the area, various stakeholders have advocated for improved infrastructure and conservation measures at Assap Falls to enhance the visitor experience and protect the natural environment. Efforts to develop the site have focused on balancing tourism activities with environmental preservation.

== See also ==
- List of Waterfalls
