= Bitrus Kaze =

Nigerian politician

Federal Representative
- In office 2007–2015
- Constituency: Jos South/Jos East

Personal details
- Occupation: Politician

Bitrus Kaze (born 1969) is a Nigerian politician. He served as a member of the National Assembly, representing Jos South/Jos East constituency of Plateau State during the 6th and 7th assembly from 2007 to 2015. He was elected under the platform of the People's Democratic Party (PDP).
