= Beromic languages =

Branch of the Plateau languages spoken in central Nigeria

Beromic
- Plateau II
- Geographic distribution: Nigeria
- Linguistic classification: Niger–Congo?: Atlantic–Congo; Benue–Congo; Plateau; Beromic

Language codes
- ISO 639-3: –
- Glottolog: iten1244

The four Beromic languages are a branch of the Plateau languages spoken in central Nigeria by approximately 1 million people.

== Classification ==
The following classification is taken from Blench (2008).

- Beromic
  - Shall-Zwall
    - Iten
      - Cara (Teriya)
      - Berom

Blench (2019) also includes Nincut.

== Names and locations ==
Below is a list of language names, populations, and locations from Blench (2019).

Language	Cluster	Dialects	Alternate spellings	Own name for language	Endonym(s)	Other names (location-based)	Other names for language	Exonym(s)	Speakers	Location(s)
Aten				Ten, Etien	sg Àtên, pl. Nìtèn		Ganawuri, Jal		6,710 (1963 Census): est. 40,000 (Kjenstad 1988); est. 40,000 (Blench 2003)	Plateau State, Barkin Ladi LGA; Kaduna State, Jema’a LGA
Berom		Gyel–Kuru–Vwang; Fan–Foron–Heikpang; Bachit–Gashish; Du–Ropp–Rim–Riyom; Hoss (?). Nincut is treated as a separate language.	Birom, Berum	Cèn Bèrom	sg. Wòrom, pl. Berom, Birom (Du dialect)		Afango, Akuut, Baho, Gbang, Kibbo, Kibo, Kibbun, Kibyen, Sine	Shosho, Shaushau (not recommended)	54,500 (HDG), 200,000 (1985 SIL)	Plateau State, Jos and Barkin Ladi LGAs; Kaduna State, Jema’a LGA
Cara			Chara, Nfachara, Fakara, Pakara, Fachara, Terea, Teria, Terri, Tariya						735 (1936 HDG); 5000 (Blench est. 2012). Nine villages	Plateau State, Bassa LGA
Shall–Zwall cluster	Shall–Zwall									Bauchi State, Dass LGA
Shall	Shall–Zwall									
Zwall	Shall–Zwall									
Nincut							Aboro		8 villages (5000 ? Blench 2003 est.)	Kaduna State, ?? LGA. ca. 7 km. north of Fadan Karshe

== Comparative vocabulary ==
Sample basic vocabulary of Beromic languages from Blench (2006):

Gloss	Berom F.	Berom R.	Tahos	Nincut	Cara	Iten	Shall	Zwall
eye	rēyīʃ	byènêŋ ryis	ryis		ris	ìrisé̱	iʃe	iʃi
eyes	bāyīʃ	byénêŋ bayis	be-yis		anyis	ìrwisé̱		
nose	wol	wol	wɔl		i-ŋwul	ìlol	munon	mun
noses	bawol	bawol	be-wɔl		a-ŋwul	ìlyol		
tongue	lɛ̄m	lem	lɛm		lɛm	ìle̱m		lumo
tongues	balɛ̄m	balem	lɛlɛm		a-lɛm	ìlywe̱m		
ear	fwóŋ	twoŋ	cyoŋ		ki-cuŋ	ìtsóró	yan	yan
ears	bētòŋ	bètòŋ	be-toŋ		a-tuŋ	ìtórò		
mouth	nú	nu	nu		ku-nu	è̱nú	nun	kunun
mouths	nenu	nènù	ni-nu		a-nu	nìnù		
tooth	hywín	hwin	kwin		windi	ìdzìnè̱	yinin	
teeth	ngyìn	yìn	vin		anyindi	ìdziné̱		
blood	nèmí	mmǐ; mmì (pl.)	nimi		mi	nnyi	bari	baren
bone	kùp	kùp	kup		vis	ìkub	kup	
bones	bekup	bekùp	be-kup		agis	ìkpub		
eat	re		re		re	reke+	ri	
eat (pl.)	reres		rere			re		
tree	tin, retin cɔ̀gɔ̄t	cɔgɔt	cɔ̀gɔt	tsɔ́gɔt	fɔn	èhôn	kun	kun
trees	batin cɔgɔ́t	cɔ́gɔt	cɔgɔ́t	bítsɔ́gɔ́t	akɔn	nìhòn		
water	nshí	nèshí	ninci		mal	nnè̱n	jinen	jini
