= Fom Bot =

Nigerian monarch; 3rd Gbong Gwom Jos (1935–2002)

Fom Bot CON, CFR
- 3rd Gbong Gwom Jos

Gbong Gwom
- Reign: 26 August 1969 – 1 December 2002 (33 years)
- Coronation: Accession on 26 August 1969 Jos Polo Field – Official presentation of staff of office by His Excellency, Joseph Gomwalk on 20 March 1970
- Predecessor: Rwang Pam
- Successor: Victor Pam
- Born: Fom Bot; 14 December 1935; Lobiring, Ropp District, Barkin-Ladi, British Nigeria (present-day Plateau State, Nigeria)
- Died: 1 December 2002 (aged 66); London, United Kingdom
- Burial: 19 December 2002; Gbong Gwom Jos Palace, Jos.
- Spouse: Ngem Makut (m. 1953) Titi Dung (m. 1957)
- House: selected through election by the kingmakers (Jos Joint Traditional Council) and approved by the Government of Plateau State
- Religion: Christianity
- Occupation: Traditional Ruler

Fom Bot CON, CFR (14 December 1935 – 1 December 2002) was a Nigerian traditional ruler who was Gbong Gwom Jos (Most Eminent King of Jos) from his accession on 26 August 1969 to his passing on 1 December 2002. He previously served as the district head of Ropp from 1953 to 1958. He then served as Secretary of Jos Local Government Council from 1958 to 1969 when he ascended to the throne as the 3rd Gbong Gwom Jos. As Gbong Gwom Jos, he also doubled as the Chairman of the Plateau State Traditional Council of Chiefs. His coronation and official presentation of staff of office took place on 20 March 1970 at the Jos Polo Field. At his coronation, the Gbong Gwom Jos stool was elevated to first class and so during his reign, he was one of the very few traditional rulers in Plateau State that were first class. At the time of his death, he had reigned for a record 33 years already, making him the longest reigning occupant of the Gbong Gwom Jos stool.

== Birth and educational background ==
Fom Bot was born on 14 December 1935 in Lobiring, Ropp District of the old Barkin-Ladi Local Government Area. He attended the Elementary School Riyom from 1945 to 1948 and then the Pankshin Central School from 1948 to 1950. He then enrolled in the Kuru Middle School from 1950 to 1952. He bagged a diploma in Public and Social Administration from the University of South Devon, England from 1962 to 1963.. In 1979, Fom Bot was awarded an Honorary Doctor of Laws degree (Hon. LL.D) by the University of Jos, Plateau State. He was again awarded an Honorary Doctor of Laws degree (Hon. LL.D) by the Bendel State University (later Delta State University) Ekpoma, Delta State in 1986. In 1988, The Honourable, Fom Bot was a non elected member of the 566-member Constituent Assembly that drafted the Third Republic Constitution.

After his death, his body was exhumed and reburied in the royal palace Jos.

== Awards ==
- Commander of the Order of the Niger (CON) – Nigeria
- Commander of the Order of the Federal Republic (CFR) – Nigeria
- Officer of the Order of Mono – Republic of Togo conferred by His Excellency Gnassingbe Eyadema, President of Togo
