= Plateau State Polytechnic =

Location
- P.M.B 02023, Barkin Ladi, Plateau State; Nigeria
- Coordinates: 9°32′00″N 8°54′00″E

Information
- Motto: Technology For Development
- Established: 1978
- Principal: BLDR John Dawam
- Website: https://plapoly.org/

Plateau State Polytechnic is a state owned polytechnic in Plateau State, North Central Nigeria. The institution has two campuses, one at Barkin Ladi and the other at Bukuru near Jos, the capital of the state. It provides education to degree and national diploma level. The rector is BLDR. John Dawam.

== History ==
The institution was founded in 1978 as a College of Technology on the site of Government Technical College, Bukuru. It became a polytechnic in 1980.

== Courses offered ==
- Agricultural Engineering / Technology
- Banking and Finance
- Building Technology
- Business Administration and Management
- Civil Engineering Technology
- Computer Engineering
- Computer Science
- Electrical Electronics Engineering
- Foundry Technology
- Hospitality Management
- Leisure and Tourism
- Library and Information Science
- Local Government Studies
- Mechanical Engineering Technology
- Metallurgy
- Mineral Resources and Engineering Technology
- Office Technology and Management
- Public Administration
- Quantity Surveying
- Science Laboratory Technology
- Social Development
- Statistics
- Urban and Regional Planning
