= Riyom =

- LGA and town
- Nickname: RY
- Interactive map of Riyom
- Location in Nigeria
- Coordinates: 9°34′N 8°40′E
- Country: Nigeria
- State: Plateau State

Government
  - Local Government Chairman: Bature Sati Shuwa
  - Gwom Rwei Riyom (Head of Riyom Traditional Council of Chiefs): His Highness Samuel Dung Jok

Area
  - Total: 807 km^{2} (312 sq mi)

Population (2006 census)12211
  - Total: 131,557
  - Density: 163/km^{2} (422/sq mi)
- Time zone: UTC+1 (WAT)
- 3-digit postal code prefix: 931
- ISO 3166 code: NG.PL.RI

Riyom is a town and Local Government Area in Plateau State, Nigeria. It was carved out of the old Barkin Ladi Local Government Area on 1 October 1996 by the Federal Military Government of General Sani Abacha.

It has an area of 807 km^{2} (312 sq mi) and a population of 131,557 at the 2006 census, which is predominantly Berom. The LGA has boundaries with Kaduna and Nasarawa State. Riyom is the birthplace of all Berom peoples.

It is the gateway to the State when coming from the East and from Abuja. Riyom is also the site of the famous Riyom rocks formation that is featured in many things Plateau and has become a trademark of the state.

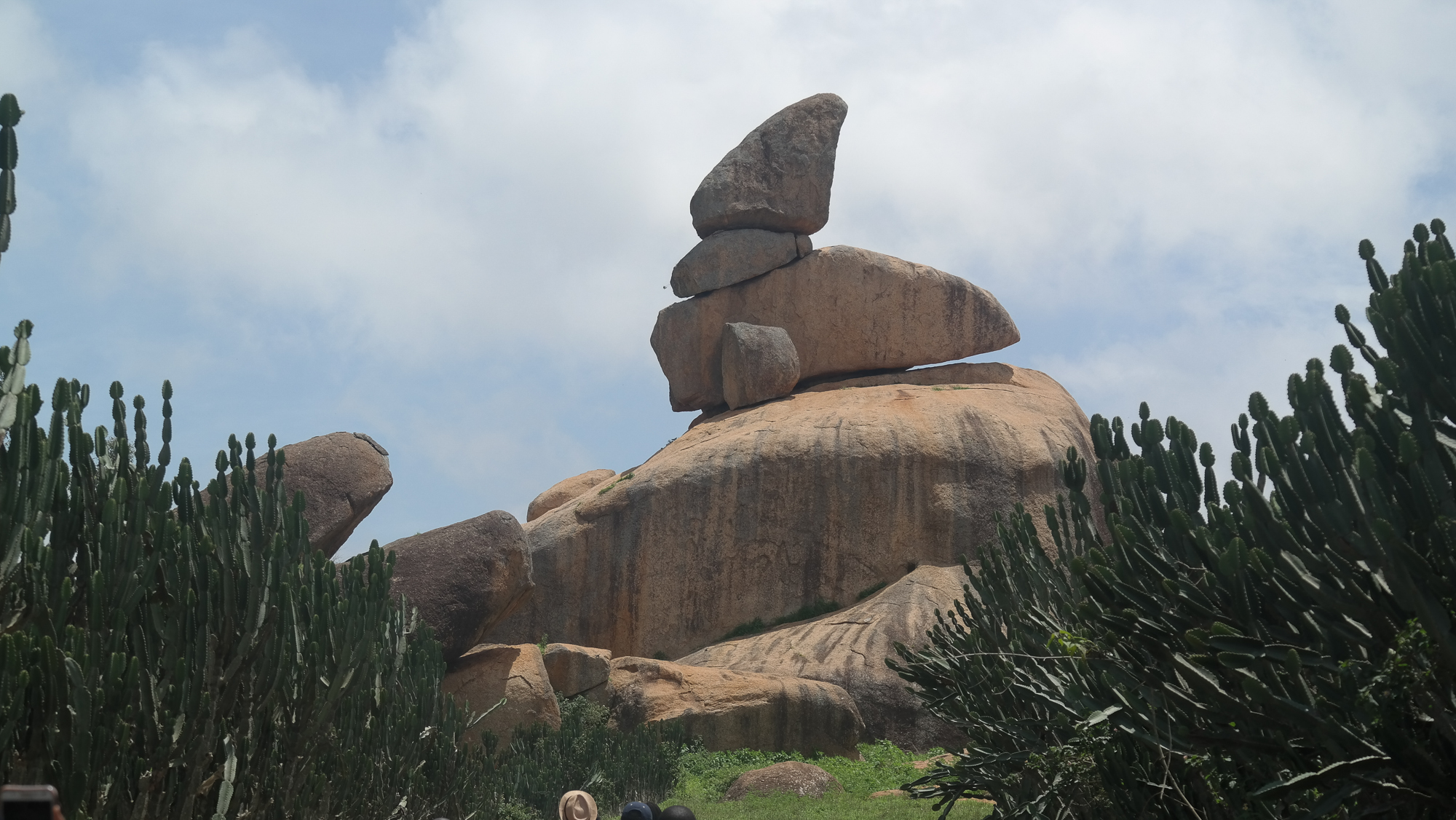

The postal code of the area is 931.

== Boundaries ==
Riyom Local Government Area (LGA) shares boundaries with Bassa LGA to the north, Jos South LGA to the northeast, and Barkin Ladi LGA to the east; and Kauru LGA to the northeast, Kaura and Jema'a LGAs to the west, and Sanga LGA to the southwest of southern Kaduna State.

== Geography ==
At an average temperature of 28 degrees Celsius or 82.4 degrees Fahrenheit, Riyom LGA covers an area of 807 square kilometres or 312 square miles. The average humidity level in the LGA is 49%, and the area is characterized by hills and rocks.

=== Climate ===
The warm, muggy, and cloudy rainy season and the hot, partly cloudy dry season are observed in Riyom Local Government Area. It rarely drops below 10 °C (50 °F) or rises over 36 °C (96 °F) throughout the year, usually fluctuating between 13 °C (55 °F) and 33 °C (91 °F).

=== Average Temperature ===
The average daily maximum temperature during the 2.8-month hot season, which runs from January 29 to April 21, is above 31 °C (88 °F). March is the hottest month in Riyom, with an average high temperature of 33 °C (91 °F) and low temperature of 18 °C (64 °F). The average daily high temperature during the 3.1-month cool season, which runs from July 1 to October 4, is below 26 °C (78 °F). With an average low of 17 °C (62 °F) and high of 24 °C (75 °F), August is the coolest month of the year in Riyom.

== Administrative subdivisions ==
Riyom Local Government Area consists of 12 districts.

== Demographics ==
Languages spoken in Riyom LGA include: Berom, Aten and Takad.

== Education ==
There are over 50 public primary schools in the Local Government Area.

== Notable people ==
- John Dungs†, soldier and statesman
- Sambo Daju†, physicist
- James Vwi (MHR), politician, and advocate
- Philip Davou Dung (Bishop), priest
- Yakubu Dadu, diplomat
- Pam Mwadkon Dachungyang, Politician, Journalist
- Damishi Sango, Politician and former Minister of the federal republic
