= Davou Zang =

Nigerian senator and business executive (born 1956)

Davou D. B. Zang

Senator of the Federal Republic of Nigeria
- In office 29 May 1999 – June 2003
- Preceded by: none prior to Nigerian Fourth Republic
- Succeeded by: Timothy Aku Adudu
- Constituency: Plateau North Senatorial District

Personal details
- Born: 23 June 1956 (age 70) Gyel, Jos South, Plateau State, Nigeria
- Party: People's Democratic Party
- Parent: Da loh D. B. Zang OON, CFR (father)
- Education: Gyel Commercial College Bukuru and University of Wisconsin-Whitewater
- Occupation: Businessman (CEO D. B. Zang Group)

Davou D. B. Zang was elected Senator for Plateau North Senatorial District of Plateau State, Nigeria at the start of the Nigerian Fourth Republic, running on the People's Democratic Party (PDP) platform. He took office on 29 May 1999. After taking his seat in the Senate in June 1999, he was appointed to committees on Solid Minerals, Industries, Science & Technology, Communication, Power & Steel, Commerce and Special Projects (vice-chairman). He ran for reelection in April 2003 but was defeated by Timothy Adudu of the All Nigeria People's Party (ANPP). He is scion of the famous tin magnate and philanthropist, Da loh D. B. Zang.
