= Plateau State Information And Communication Technology Development Agency =

Nigerian Agency

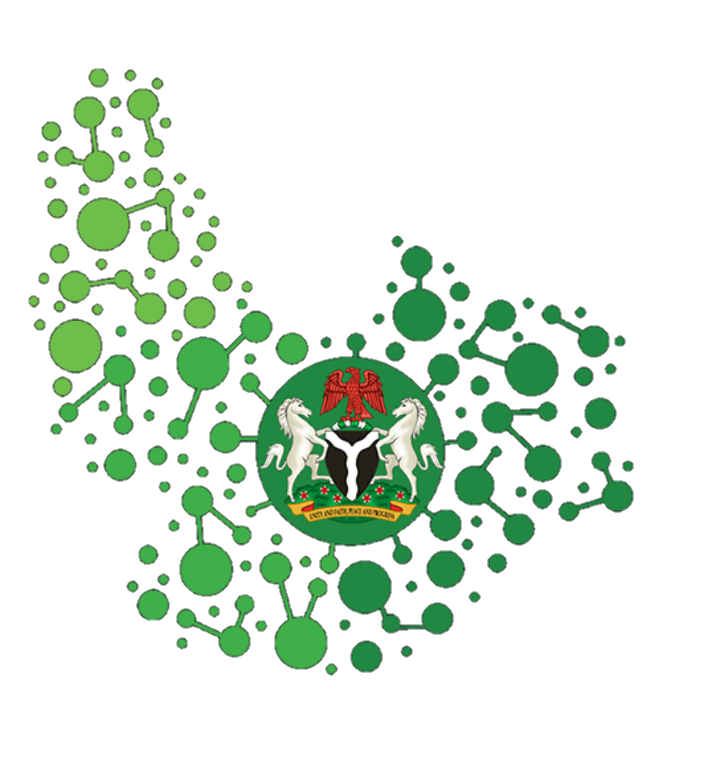

Agency overview
- Formed: 2018
- Jurisdiction: Government of Plateau State
- Headquarters: Jos, Plateau State, Nigeria
- Agency executive: Datong, Dominic Gwaman, Director General
- Website: pictda.plateaustate.gov.ng

Plateau State Information And Communication Technology Development Agency (PICTDA) is a public service institution in Plateau State established by PICTDA Act developed within the context of National ICT Policy of the National Information Technology Development Agency (NITDA) Act 2007, as the ICT policy implementing arm of the Plateau State Ministry of Science and Technology. It has the sole responsibility of developing programs that caters for the running of ICT related activities in Plateau State. PICTDA is also mandated with the implementation of policies guideline for driving ICT in Plateau State. PICTDA also works in training of citizens in various ICT initiatives that are geared towards achieving an ICT Eco friendly environment in Plateau State. Majority of these activities are achieved through initiatives such as code Plateau, a flagship project implemented under the stewardship of the agency's pioneer director-general, Daser David which cater for training needs of individuals interested in ICT related ventures, government functionaries and education sectors. It empowered 560 youths in Plateau State.
