= Cara language =

Plateau language spoken in Nigeria

Cara
- Teriya
- Native to: Nigeria
- Region: Plateau State
- Ethnicity: 6,000–7,500 Facara (2021)
- Language family: Niger–Congo?: Atlantic–Congo; Benue–Congo; Plateau; Beromic; Cara

Language codes
- ISO 639-3: cfd
- Glottolog: cara1270
- ELP: Cara

- People: Facara [fàʧáɾà]
- Language: Cara [ʧáɾà]

Cara (Chara, Fachara), also called Teriya after the largest of the ten towns/villages it is spoken in, is a small Plateau language of central Nigeria, tentatively placed in the Beromic branch of that family. Cara is spoken by about 3,000 people in Teriya village of Bassa, Plateau State. Due to language shift, an unknown fraction of the ethnic population of an estimated 6,000 to 7,500 Facara speak the language.
