= Edward Pwajok =

Nigerian politician

Edward Pwajok is a Nigerian politician, lawmaker, and Senior Advocate of Nigeria.

== Early life and career ==
Edward studied law at the University of Jos and later completed his studies at the Nigerian Law School in Lagos. He served as Plateau State’s Attorney General and Commissioner for Justice from 2007 to 2011.

In 2015, he was elected to the House of Representatives, representing the Jos South/Jos East Federal Constituency.

In 2016, he was appointed a Senior Advocate of Nigeria (SAN) by the Supreme Court.
