= Eten language =

Plateau language spoken in Nigeria

Eten
- Ganawuri
- Etien
- Native to: Nigeria
- Region: Plateau State
- Native speakers: 40,000 (2003)
- Language family: Niger–Congo?: Atlantic–Congo; Benue–Congo; Plateau; Beromic; Eten

Language codes
- ISO 639-3: etx
- Glottolog: eten1239

Ten
- Person: Àtên
- People: Nìtèn
- Language: Etien

Eten (Iten; exonyms: Tyap: Tyen) is a Plateau language of Nigeria. The people who speak this language, the Niten are found in the town of Ganawuri in Plateau State.
