= Timothy Adudu =

Nigerian politician

Senator
- Constituency: Plateau North Senatorial District

Personal details
- Occupation: Politician

Timothy Adudu is a Nigerian politician. He was a senator who represented the Plateau North Senatorial District during the 5th National Assembly.
