= Shall-Zwall language =

Plateau languages in Nigeria

Shall-Zwall
- Native to: Nigeria
- Region: Bauchi State
- Native speakers: 8,900 (2004)
- Language family: Niger–Congo?: Atlantic–Congo; Benue–Congo; Plateau; Tarokoid; Shall-Zwall
- Dialects: Shall; Zwall

Language codes
- ISO 639-3: sha
- Glottolog: shal1242

Shall-Zwall is a small dialect cluster of Plateau languages in Nigeria. Blench (2023) classifies Shall-Zwall as a Tarokoid language.
