= Nincut language =

Language spoken in Kaduna State, Nigeria

Nincut
- Aboro
- Native to: Nigeria
- Region: Kaduna State
- Language family: Niger–Congo?: Atlantic–Congo; Benue–Congo; Plateau; Beromic; Nincut

Language codes
- ISO 639-3: –

Nincut (Aboro) is a Plateau language of Kaduna State, Nigeria belonging to the Beromic branch. Blench estimates 5,000 speakers in 2003. It is spoken 7 km north of Fadan Karshe in Kaduna State. Nincut is not recorded in Ethnologue or Glottolog.
