= Bukuru =

- city
- Location within Nigeria
- Coordinates: 09°48′N 08°52′E
- Country: Nigeria
- State: Plateau State
- LGA: Jos South
- Elevation: 1,230 m (4,040 ft)
- Time zone: UTC+1 (WAT)

Bukuru is a city located on the Jos Plateau in Nigeria. It was previously considered a separate city from the city of Jos close by, but like every other form of urbanization, the city of Jos has merged with the town of Bukuru to form the Jos-Bukuru metropolis. It is the headquarters of Jos South Local Government Area.

== Overview ==
It lies along a branch railway, and it is still a major tin and columbite mining centre. It is situated on one of the highest parts of the plateau, more than 4,000 feet (1,200 metres) above sea level. In recent times, Bukuru has witnessed massive urbanization growth with the influx of banks, hotels and recreation centers. It boasts of the only independent power company in Plateau State, the Nigerian Electricity Supply Company (NESCO). It is also home to one of the most successful industries in Nigeria like Grand Cereals and Oil Mills Limited, a subsidiary of United African Company (UAC).

== Transport ==
A 762 mm (2 ft 6 in) Bauchi Light Railway, which was closed in 1957, was built in 1914 to carry tin from Bukuru to Zaria (120 miles [190 km] northwest) and connected a line to Lagos. The present 1,067 mm (3 ft 6 in) railway branch linking Port Harcourt (370 miles [595 km] south-southwest) to the Jos and Bukuru mines was completed in 1927. Minerals are now sent to Jos for smelting and then to Port Harcourt for export. Bukuru is also associated with the opencast mine workings are exploitable deposits of kaolin.

== Religion ==
Bukuru has a mix of Christians and Muslims with a Christian majority. Some of the earliest churches in Bukuru are the Roman Catholic Church, Church of Christ in Nations (COCIN), Evangelical Church of West Africa (ECWA), Anglican church, First Baptist Church and the Apostolic Church. Theological College of Northern Nigeria (TCNN) is a seminary located in Bukuru alongside the headquarters of Africa Christian Textbooks (ACTS).

There is a central mosque in Bukuru.

== See also ==
- Railway stations in Nigeria
- Nigerian Electricity Supply Company (NESCO), founded by the Amalgamated Tin Mining Company of Nigeria (ATMN)

== Sources ==
- Encyclopædia Britannica
