= Jacob Gyang Buba =

5th Gbong Gwom Jos (born 1951)

Da. Jacob Gyang Buba (CON, OFR, CFR)
- Gbong Gwom Jos (Most eminent King of Jos)
- Reign: August 2009 – present
- Coronation: 1 August 2009
- Predecessor: Da Victor Dung Pam

Comptroller-General of the Nigerian Customs Service
- Term: January 2004 – 24 May 2008
- Successor: Hamman Bello
- Born: 10 October 1951 (age 74); Madu, Du. Jos South, Plateau State
- Military career
- Allegiance: Nigeria
- Branch: Nigerian Customs Service
- Service years: 1975–2008
- Rank: Comptroller-General

Da Jacob Gyang Buba CFR (born October 10, 1951) is a retired Nigeria customs officer and elder statesman. He served as the Comptroller-General of the Nigeria Customs Service from 2004 to 2008. On April 1, 2009, he was sworn in as the Gbong Gwom, the paramount traditional ruler of the Berom Kingdom, becoming the 5th Gbong Gwom after the demise of Da Victor Dung Pam. He is the Chairman, Jos Traditional Council of Chiefs and president of the Plateau State Traditional Council. He currently serves as the 3rd Chancellor of the Nnamdi Azikiwe University since March 2016 at the 10th convocation of the institution.

== Background ==
Gyang Buba was born on October 10, 1951, in Madu Village of Du District, Jos South, Plateau State. He is the first son of Buba Dung Bot of the Lo Du, Lo-Wet family and Ngo Kaneng Buba, one among the ruling house of the kingdom.

He began his early education at SUM elementary school Chwelnyap from 1960 to 1963 then went to Baptist Day School Jos to complete his elementary studies. After finishing, He attended from 1966 to 1971, and graduated from the Provincial Secondary School, Kuru now known as Government Science Secondary School Kuru and afterwards attended the Institute of Administration in Ahmadu Bello University and graduated with a Diploma in Banking in 1975.

== Career ==
He started work as a clerk at the Federal Pay Office in 1972 to 1974 before attending the Institute of Administration and enrolled in the Nigeria Customs Service in 1975 as the assistant preventive officer. He became CG in 2004 and together was the chairman of the African Union Sub-committee of directors general of Customs during the 2007 to 2008, the last post held was the deputy CG of customs at the Abuja's headquarter.

As the CG of customs, he implemented the adaptation of the Common External Tariffs for ECOWAS and operations of scanners in borders, areas of airports and port, he amends the holistic review of the Customs and Excise Management Act 1958 and various customs notice. Gyang attends various Trades conferences of which amongst includes the INTERPOL seminars. He is an ordained member of the Seventh Day Adventist Church, and has been awarded the national honors of Commander of the Order of the Niger (CON) and the Officer of the Federal Republic (OFR), he was also a member in the 2014 National Conference.

== Awards ==
In October 2022, a Nigerian national honor of Commander Of The Order Of The Federal Republic (CFR) was conferred on him by President Muhammadu Buhari.
