= Jos =

Capital city of Plateau State, Nigeria

- City
- Jos–Bukuru Metropolis
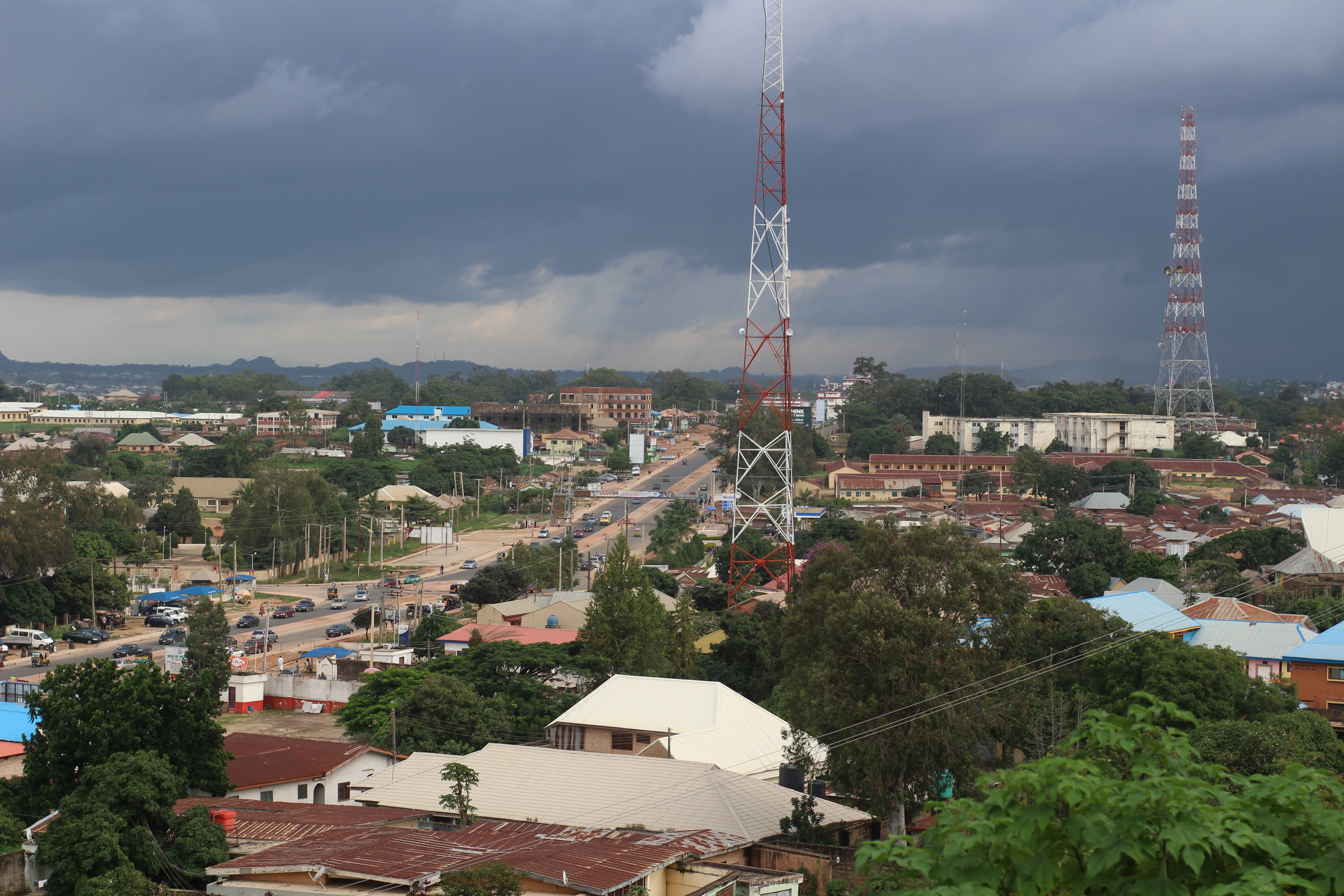
- View of Jos, looking south over the Jos-Bukuru expressway
- Nickname: J-Town
- Location in Nigeria
- Coordinates: 09°55′00″N 08°53′25″E
- Country: Nigeria
- State: Plateau State
- LGAs: Jos East; Jos North; Jos South

Government
  - Governor of Plateau State: Caleb Mutfwang
  - Deputy Governor: Josephine Piyo
  - Supreme Judge: David Mann
  - Gbong Gwom Jos: Jacob Gyang Buba
- Elevation: 1,220 m (4,000 ft)

Population (2010)
  - Total: 821,618
  - Rank: 6th

GDP (PPP, 2015 int. Dollar)
  - Year: 2023
  - Total: $6.3 billion
  - Per capita: $6,500
- Time zone: UTC+1 (West Africa Time)
- Climate: Aw

Jos /ˈdʒɔːs/ is a city in Plateau State of North-Central region of Nigeria with a population of about 900,000 residents based on the 2006 census. Popularly called "J-Town", it is the administrative capital and largest city of Plateau State. The city is situated on the Jos plateau which lies within the Guinea Savannah of North-Central Nigeria. It connects most of the North-Eastern capitals to the Federal Capital Territory Abuja, by road. Driving in and out of Jos, traffic encounters very steep and windy bends and mountainous sceneries typical of the plateau, from which the state derives its name.

During the period of British colonial rule, Jos became an important centre for tin mining after large deposits of cassiterite, the main ore for the metal, were discovered. It is also the trading hub of Plateau State as commercial activities are steadily increasing.

== History ==
The earliest known settlers of the land that would come to be known as Nigeria were the Nok people (c. 1000 BC), skilled artisans from around the Jos area who mysteriously vanished in the late first millennium.

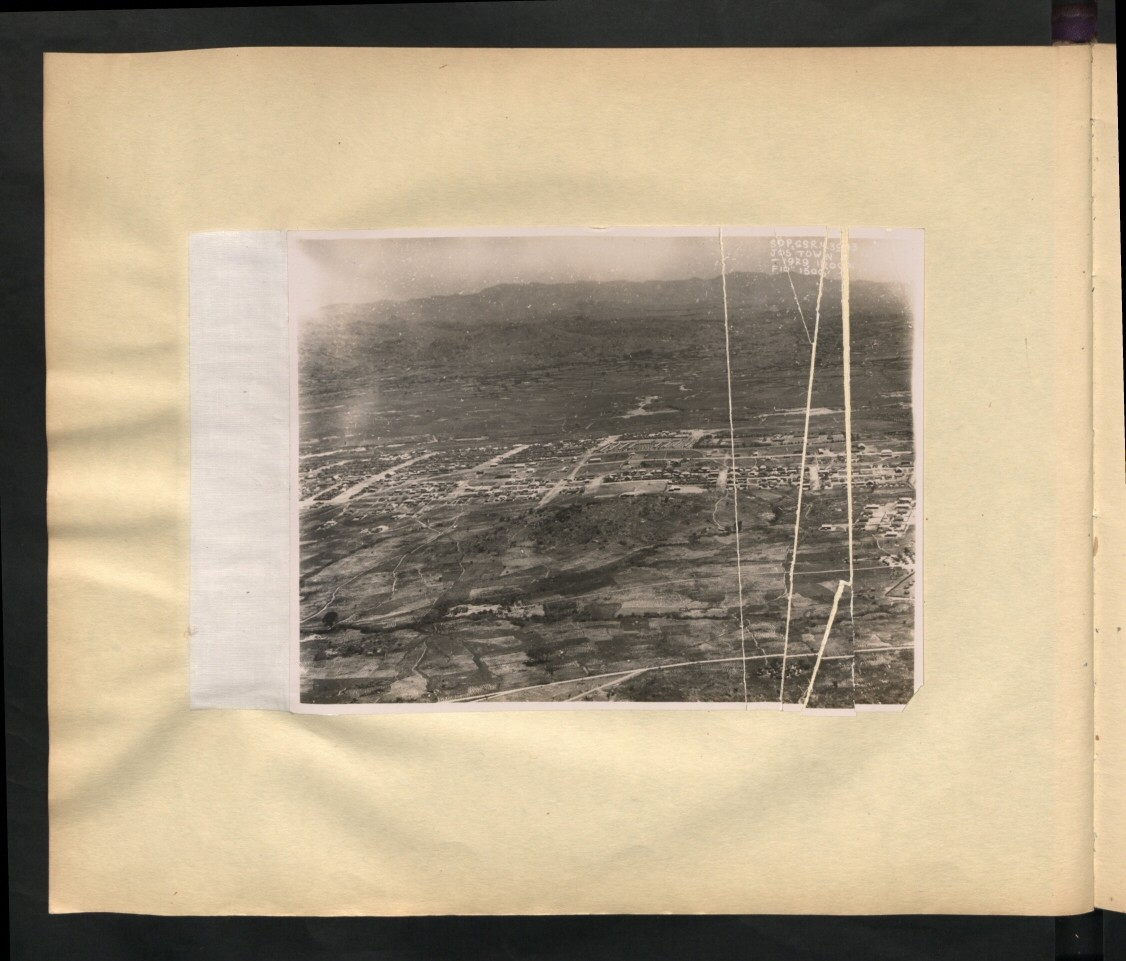
Early British settlement in Jos, 1905

According to the historian Sen Luka Gwom Zangabadt, the area known as Jos today was inhabited by indigenous ethnic groups who were mostly farmers. During the British colonial period, direct rule was introduced for the indigenous ethnic groups on the Jos Plateau since they were not under the Fulani emirates where indirect rule was used.

According to the historian Samuel N Nwabara, the Fulani empire controlled most of northern Nigeria, except the Plateau province and the Berom, Ngas, Tiv, Jukun and Idoma ethnic groups. It was the discovery of tin by the British that led to the influx of other ethnic groups such as the Hausa from the north, southeastern Igbo, and Yoruba from the country's southwest. As such, Jos is often recognised as a cosmopolitan Nigerian city.

== Etymology and early settlement ==
The term Jos is widely believed to be a corrupted adaptation of an earlier indigenous name. The area was originally inhabited by the Berom, Anaguta, and Afizere (Jere) peoples, who are regarded as the earliest settlers prior to the arrival of other groups from across present-day Nigeria.

There is no clear scholarly consensus on the precise linguistic origin of the name Jos. Some local traditions associate the name with Jot, a term said to have been used by the Berom people, while others link it to Gwash or Gwosh, names attributed to the Afizere and Anaguta communities. These interpretations remain debated and are not conclusively established in the academic literature.

It grew rapidly after the British discovered vast tin deposits in the vicinity. Both tin and columbite were extensively mined in the area up until the 1960s. They were transported by railway to both Port Harcourt and Lagos on the coast, and then exported from those ports. Jos is still often referred to as "Tin City". It was made capital of Benue-Plateau State in 1967 and became the capital of the new Plateau State in 1975. Jos has become an important national administrative, commercial, and tourist centre. Tin mining led to the influx of migrants (mostly Hausa, Igbos, Yorubas and Europeans) who constitute more than half of the population of Jos. This "melting pot" of race, ethnicity and religion makes Jos one of the most cosmopolitan cities in Nigeria. For this reason, Plateau State is known in Nigeria as the "home of peace and tourism".

Excellent footage of Jos in 1936 including the tin mines, local people and the colonial population is held by the Cinema Museum in London [ref HM0172].

== Political divisions ==
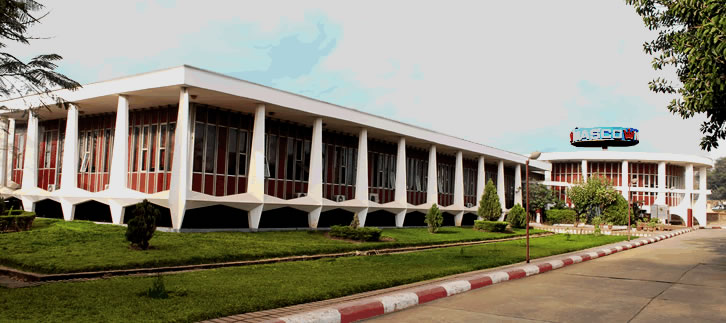
The Nasco corporate headquarters is in Jos

The city is divided into 2 local government areas of Jos North and Jos South. The city proper lies between Jos North and parts of Jos South headquartered in Bukuru.

=== Jos North ===
The Local Government Council administration is headquartered here. Jos North is the commercial nerve centre of the state as it houses the state's branch of Nigeria's Central Bank and the headquarters of the commercial banks are mostly located here as well as the currency exchanges along Ahmadu Bello Way. Moreover, all basic and essential services can be found in Jos North from the Jos Main market (terminus) to the Kabong or Rukuba Road satellite market. Due to recent communal clashes, however, a lot of commercial activities are shifting to Jos South.

The palace and office of the Gbong Gwom Jos (traditional ruler of Jos) are located in an area in Jos North called Jishe in the Berom language. In 1956, Her Majesty Queen Elizabeth II together with her consort Prince Philip had a weekend stopover to rest at Jishe during her Nigeria tour. Jishe was known at that time as Tudun Wada cottage. Jos North has a significant slum. Jos North is the location of the University of Jos and its teaching hospital at Laminga & the National Commission for Museums and Monuments. The Nigerian Film Institute is also located in Jos-North at the British America junction along Murtala Mohammed way. Both the Evangelical Church Winning All (ECWA) and the Church of Christ in Nations (COCIN) are headquartered in this part of the metropolis. The Roman Catholic Ecclesiastical province of Jos and seat of the Metropolitan (Archbishop) is located in Jos North. Hospitals like the Plateau State Specialist Hospital and the Bingham University Teaching Hospital are located here. There is also the famous Hill Station Hotel and Plateau Hotel Rock Garden located in Jos North.

=== Jos South ===
Jos South is the second most populous Local Government Area in Plateau State and has its Council located along Bukuru expressway. Jos South is the seat of the Executive Governor of Plateau State i.e. the old Government House in Rayfield and the New Government House in Little Rayfield and the industrial centre of Plateau State due to the presence of industries like the NASCO group of companies, Standard Biscuits, Grand Cereals and Oil Mills, Zuma steel west Africa, aluminium roofing industries, Jos International Breweries among others. Jos South also houses prestigious institutions like the National Institute of Policy and Strategic Studies (NIPSS), the highest academic awarding institution in Nigeria, the Police Staff College, the NTA television college, Nigerian Film Corporation and Karl Kumm University. Jos South also houses the prestigious National Centre For Remote Sensing. The city has formed an agglomeration with the town of Bukuru to form the Jos-Bukuru metropolis (JBM). Jos also is the seat of the famous National Veterinary Research Institute (NVRI), situated in Vom. and the Industrial Training Fund (ITF).

== Geography and climate ==
Situated almost at the geographical centre of Nigeria and about 179 kilometres (111 miles) from Abuja, the nation's capital, Jos is linked by road, rail and air to the rest of the country. The city is served by Yakubu Gowon Airport, but its rail connections no longer operate as the only currently operational section of Nigeria's rail network is the western line from Lagos to Kano.

At an altitude of 1,217 m (3,993 ft) above sea level, Jos' climate is closer to temperate than that of the vast majority of Nigeria. Average monthly temperatures range from 21–25 °C (70–77 °F), and from mid-November to late January, night-time temperatures drop as low as 7 °C (45 °F). Hail sometimes falls during the rainy season because of the cooler temperatures at high altitudes. These cooler temperatures have, from colonial times until the present day, made Jos a favourite holiday location for both tourists and expatriates based in Nigeria.

Jos receives about 1,400 millimetres (55 inches) of rainfall annually, the precipitation arising from both convectional and orographic sources, owing to the location of the city on the Jos Plateau.

According to the Köppen climate classification system, Jos has a tropical savanna climate, abbreviated Aw.

Climate data for Jos (1991–2020 normals, extremes 1947–1970, 1991–2020)
Month	Jan	Feb	Mar	Apr	May	Jun	Jul	Aug	Sep	Oct	Nov	Dec	Year
Record high °C (°F)	35 (95)	34.5 (94.1)	35.6 (96.1)	36 (97)	35.3 (95.5)	32.2 (90.0)	29.2 (84.6)	30 (86)	29.5 (85.1)	34 (93)	31.7 (89.1)	32 (90)	36.0 (96.8)
Mean daily maximum °C (°F)	28.3 (82.9)	30.2 (86.4)	31.9 (89.4)	30.8 (87.4)	28.4 (83.1)	26.4 (79.5)	24.6 (76.3)	24.1 (75.4)	26.0 (78.8)	27.5 (81.5)	28.3 (82.9)	28.0 (82.4)	27.9 (82.2)
Daily mean °C (°F)	20.0 (68.0)	22.1 (71.8)	24.5 (76.1)	24.7 (76.5)	23.4 (74.1)	21.9 (71.4)	20.8 (69.4)	20.5 (68.9)	21.4 (70.5)	21.9 (71.4)	20.8 (69.4)	19.8 (67.6)	21.8 (71.2)
Mean daily minimum °C (°F)	11.8 (53.2)	14.0 (57.2)	17.0 (62.6)	18.6 (65.5)	18.4 (65.1)	17.5 (63.5)	17.0 (62.6)	16.9 (62.4)	16.8 (62.2)	16.4 (61.5)	13.3 (55.9)	11.5 (52.7)	15.8 (60.4)
Record low °C (°F)	1.1 (34.0)	7.2 (45.0)	10 (50)	12.5 (54.5)	12 (54)	13 (55)	11 (52)	9.5 (49.1)	10 (50)	10.0 (50.0)	8 (46)	6 (43)	1.1 (34.0)
Average precipitation mm (inches)	0.4 (0.02)	5.1 (0.20)	13.4 (0.53)	93.2 (3.67)	176.5 (6.95)	207.1 (8.15)	248.7 (9.79)	255.5 (10.06)	181.9 (7.16)	58.7 (2.31)	1.2 (0.05)	1.2 (0.05)	1,242.9 (48.93)
Average precipitation days (≥ 1.0 mm)	0.1	0.3	1.2	6.8	13.3	14.7	19.0	19.6	15.1	5.9	0.1	0.2	96.3
Average relative humidity (%)	21.5	20.6	28.7	52.7	70.3	76.7	81.7	86.1	83.1	73.2	47.0	29.4	55.9
Mean monthly sunshine hours	282.1	254.8	238.7	204.0	204.6	198.0	158.1	139.5	177.0	238.7	285.0	288.3	2,668.8
Percentage possible sunshine	79	78	64	56	53	53	41	37	49	65	82	81	61
Source 1: NOAA (sunshine 1961–1990)
Source 2: DWD (extremes)

== Education ==
Jos is home to University of Jos one of the largest University in Nigeria. The institution is very prominent in the fields of Agriculture, Science, Finance, Medicine and Law. The school is known for the large number of elites from the region that passed through its academic buildings and counts among its alumni former Nigerian heads of state, Yakubu Gowon.

Jos is also the base for the Nigerian Film Corporation, Federal College of Forestry, NTA TV College, Karl kumm University, Jos University Teaching Hospital, Bingham University Teaching Hospital, Some historic secondary school in the city is the Air force military school.

== Features ==
330 Nigerian Air Force station Jos

the 330 Nigerian Air Force station is located in the Jos South Local Government area along the old airport road. The station boasts blocks of barracks for air personnel, an airstrip, a primary school, a military secondary school and a hospital which is arguably one of the best in the state.

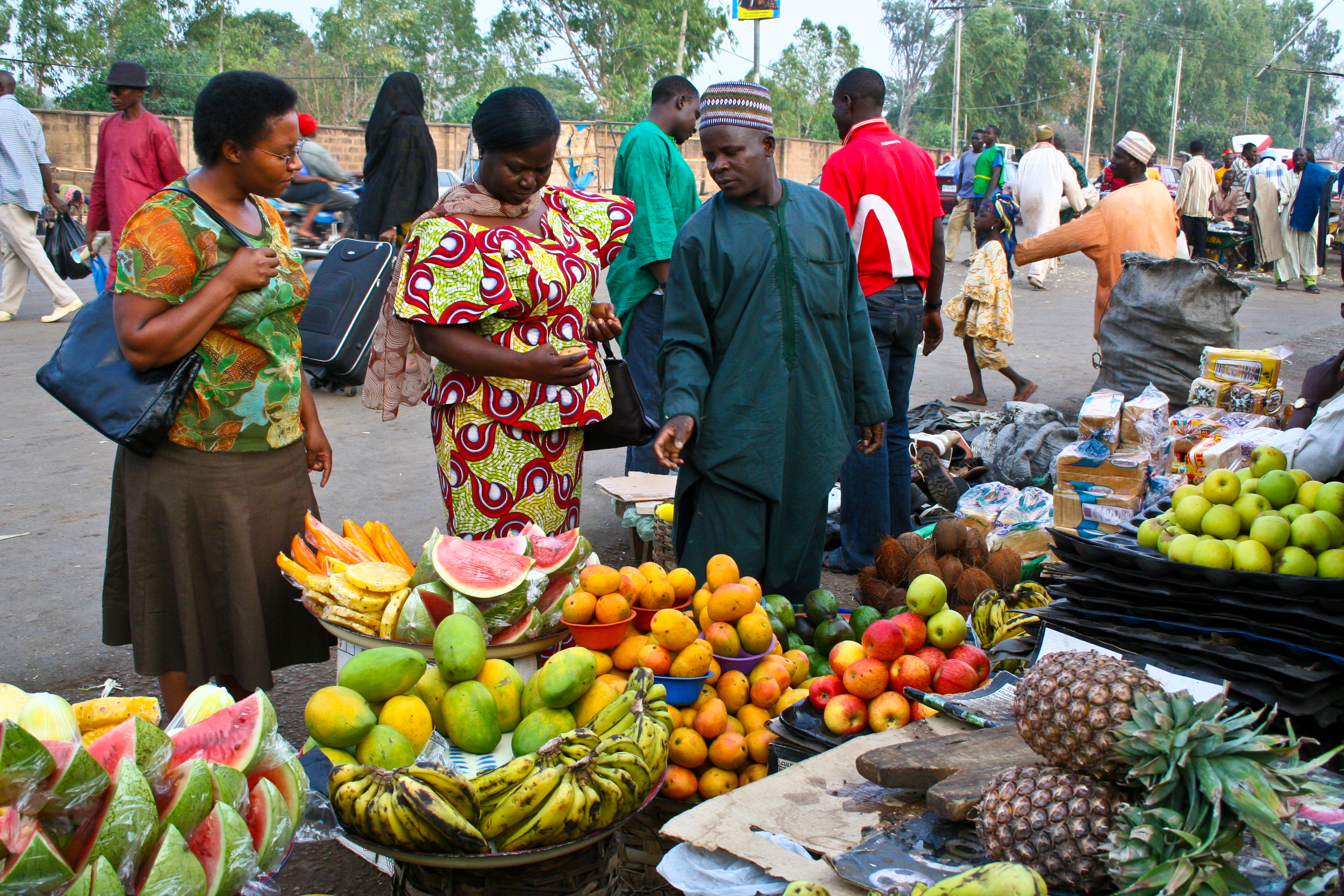
Fruit for sale at the Park Market.

Jos Wildlife Park

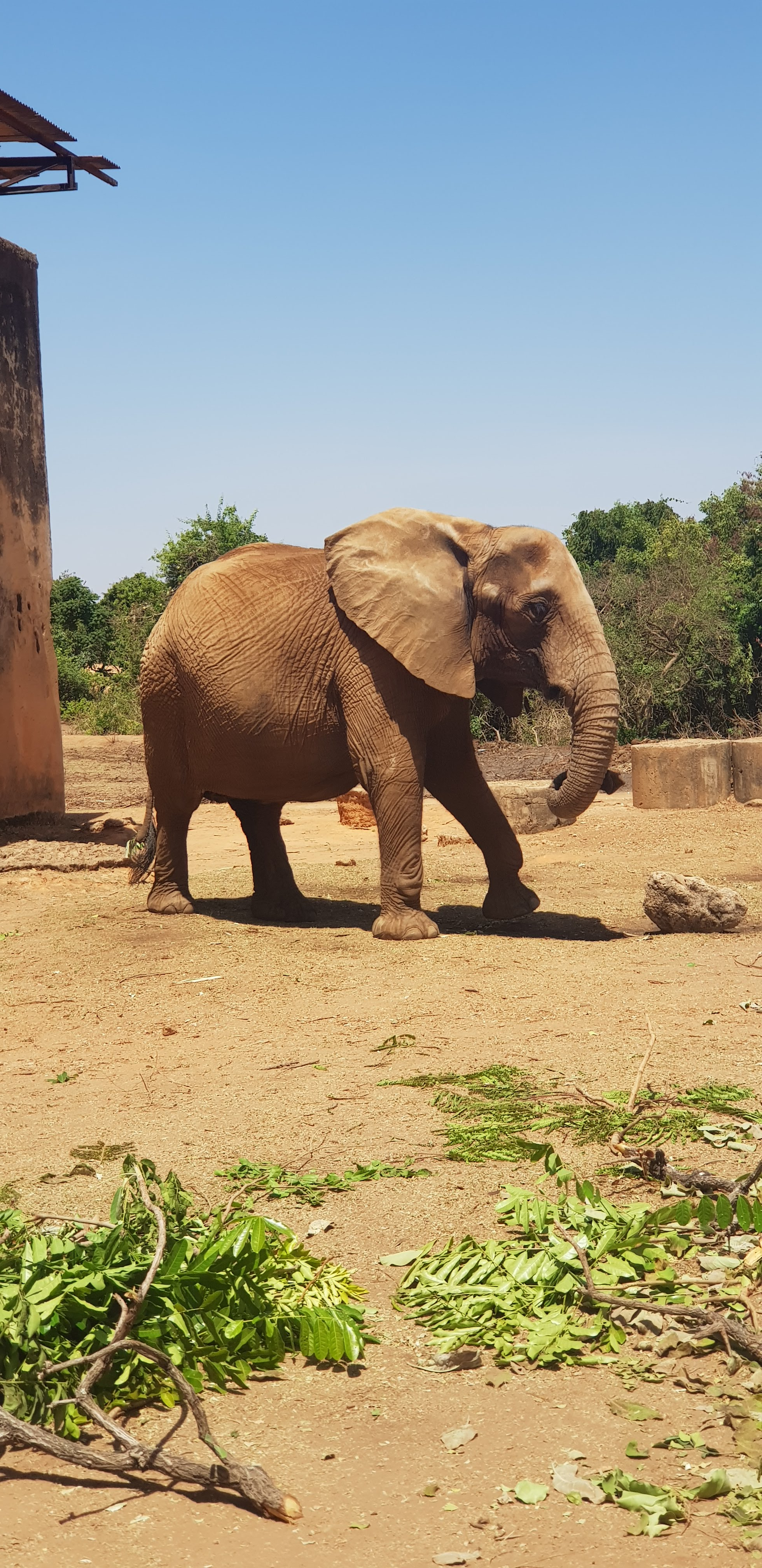
An elephant at Jos Wildlife Park

Covering roughly 3 square miles (7.8 km^{2}) of savannah bush and established in 1972 under the administration of then Governor of Benue-Plateau Joseph Gomwalk in alliance with a mandate by the then Organisation of African Unity to African heads of state to earmark one-third of their landmass to establish conservation areas in each of their countries, It has since then become a major attraction in the state, attracting tourists from within and outside the country. The park has become a home to various species of wildlife including Lions, Rock pythons, marabou storks, Baboons, Honey Badgers, Camels as well as variant flora.

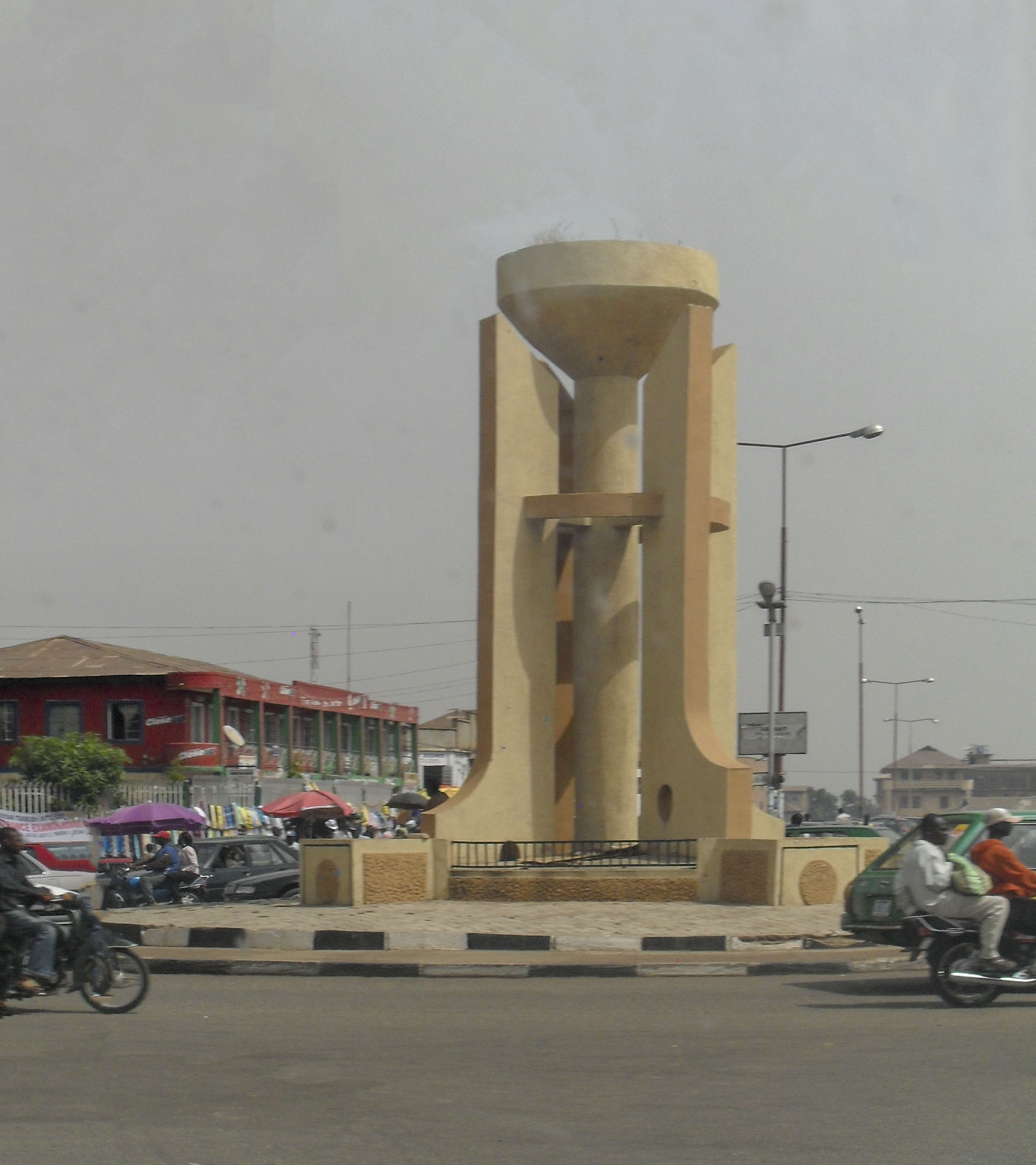
Ahmadu Bello Way roundabout in central Jos.

Jos Museum

The National Museum in Jos was founded in 1952 by Bernard Fagg, and was recognized as one of the best in the country. It has unfortunately been left to fall to ruin as is the case with most of the cultural establishments in Nigeria. The Pottery Hall is also a part of the museum that has an exceptional collection of finely crafted pottery from all over Nigeria and boasts some fine specimens of Nok terracotta heads and artefacts dating from 500 BCE to 200 CE. It also incorporates the Museum of Traditional Nigerian Architecture with life-size replicas of a variety of buildings, from the walls of Kano and the Mosque at Zaria to a Tiv village. Articles of interest from colonial times relating to the railway and tin mining can also be found on display. A School for Museum Technicians is attached to the museum, established with the help of UNESCO. The Jos Museum is also located beside the zoo.

Jos Polo Club

Situated at the end of Joseph Gomwalk Road, the Jos Polo Club is one of the prominent sports institutions in the state.

Jos Stadium

A 40,000-seat capacity located along Farin-Gada road which has become home to the Plateau United Football Club, Current champions of The Nigerian Professional League. Rwang Pam township stadium Jos.

Jos Golf Course

The golf course located in Rayfield, Jos has hosted many golfing competitions with players coming from both within and outside the state.

Other local enterprises include food processing, beer brewing, and the manufacture of cosmetics, soap, rope, jute bags, and furniture. Heavy industry produces cement and asbestos cement, crushed stone, rolled steel, and tyre retreads. Jos is also a centre for the construction industry and has several printing and publishing firms. The Jos-Bukuru dam and reservoir on the Shen River provide water for the city's industries.

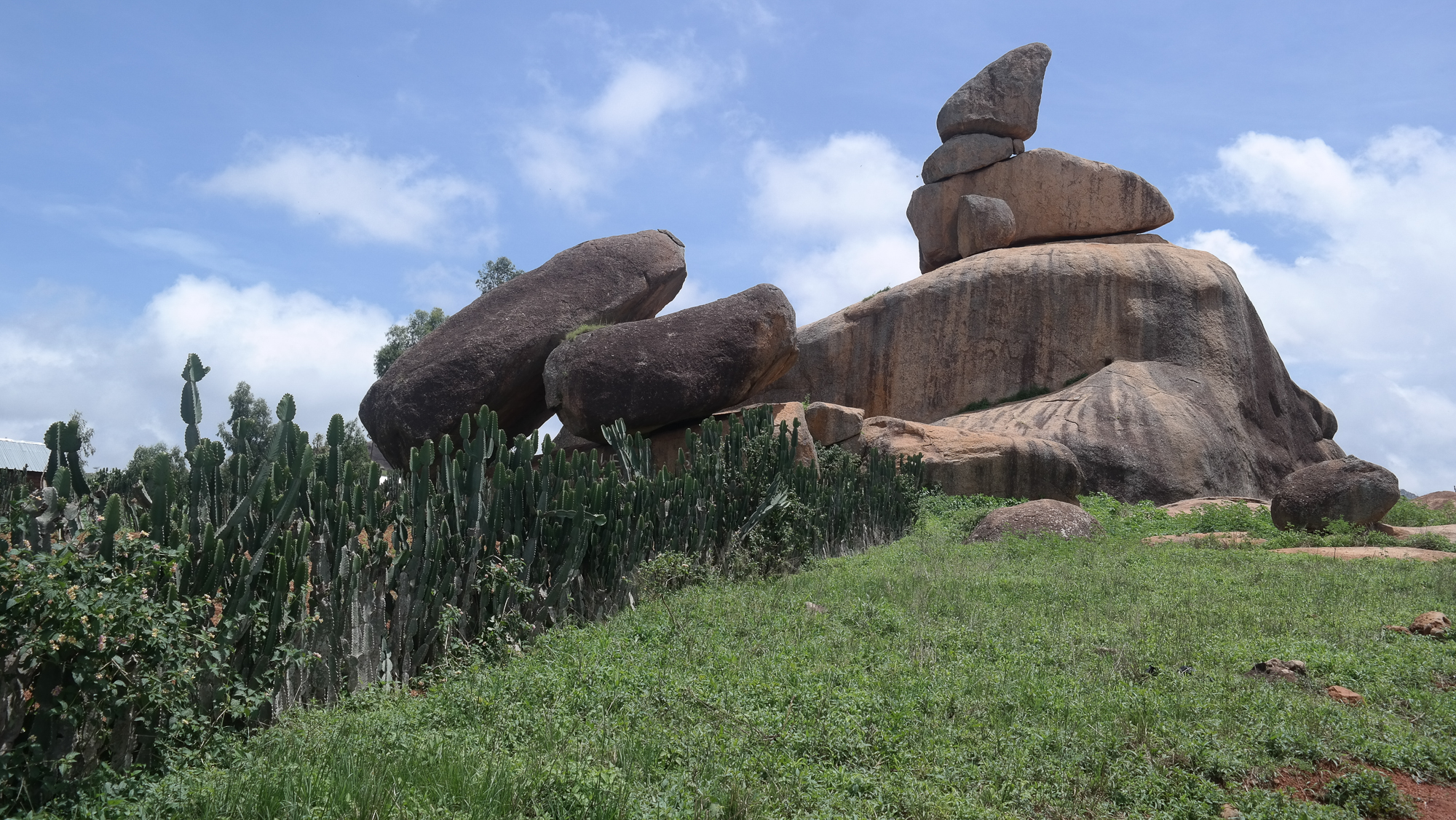
Riyom Rocks

Jos is a base for exploring Plateau State. The Shere Hills, seen to the east of Jos, offer a prime view of the city below. Assop Falls is a small waterfall which makes a picnic spot on a drive from Jos to Abuja. Riyom Rock is a dramatic and photogenic pile of rocks balanced precariously on top of one another, with one resembling a clown's hat, observable from the main Jos-Akwanga road.

The city is home to the University of Jos (founded in 1975), St Luke's Cathedral, an airport and a railway station. Jos is served by several teaching hospitals including Bingham University Teaching Hospital and Jos University Teaching Hospital (JUTH), a federal government-funded referral hospital. The Nigerian College of Accountancy, with over 3,000 students in 2011, is based in Kwall, Plateau State.

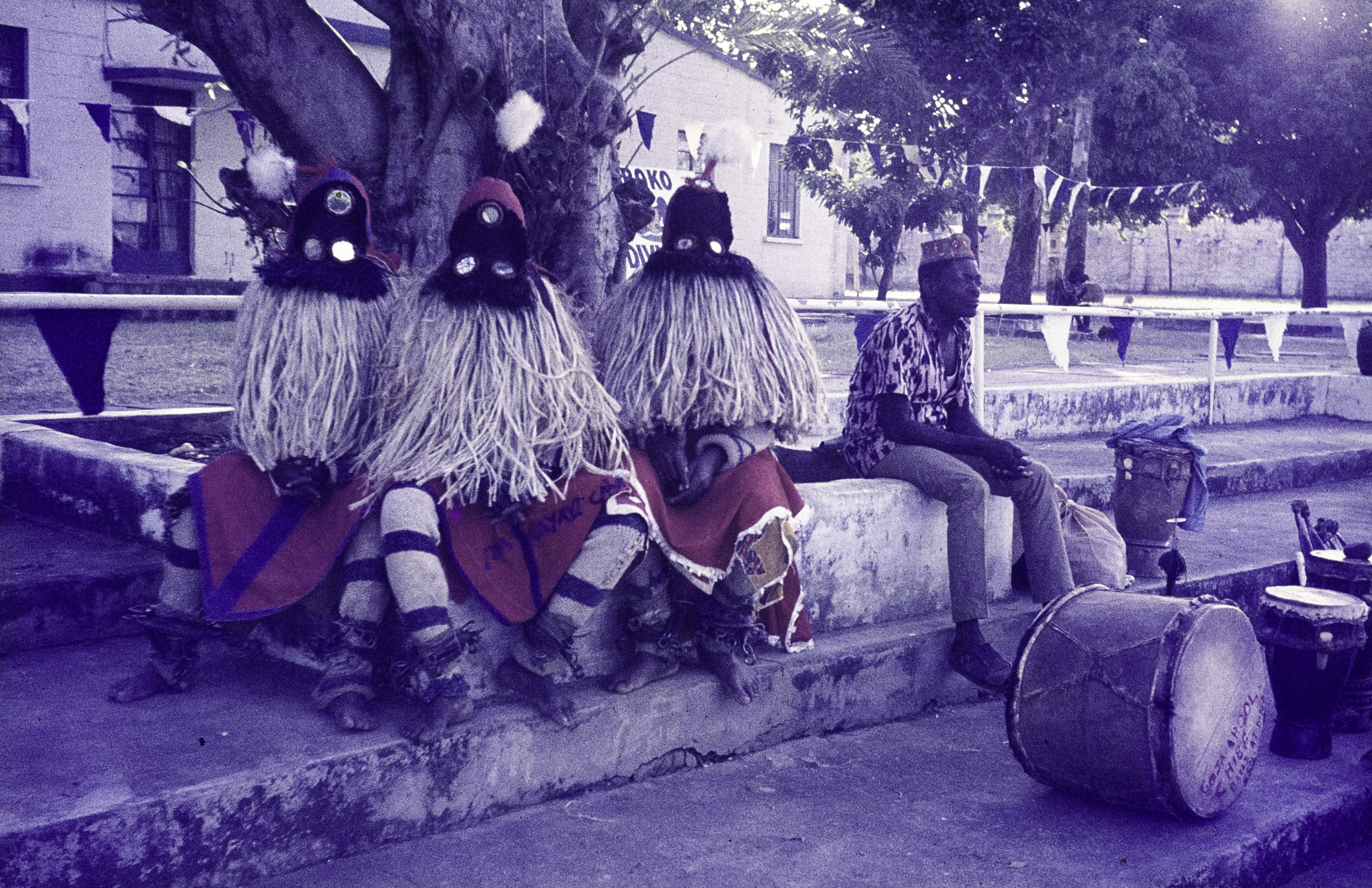
Three men dressed as evil spirits

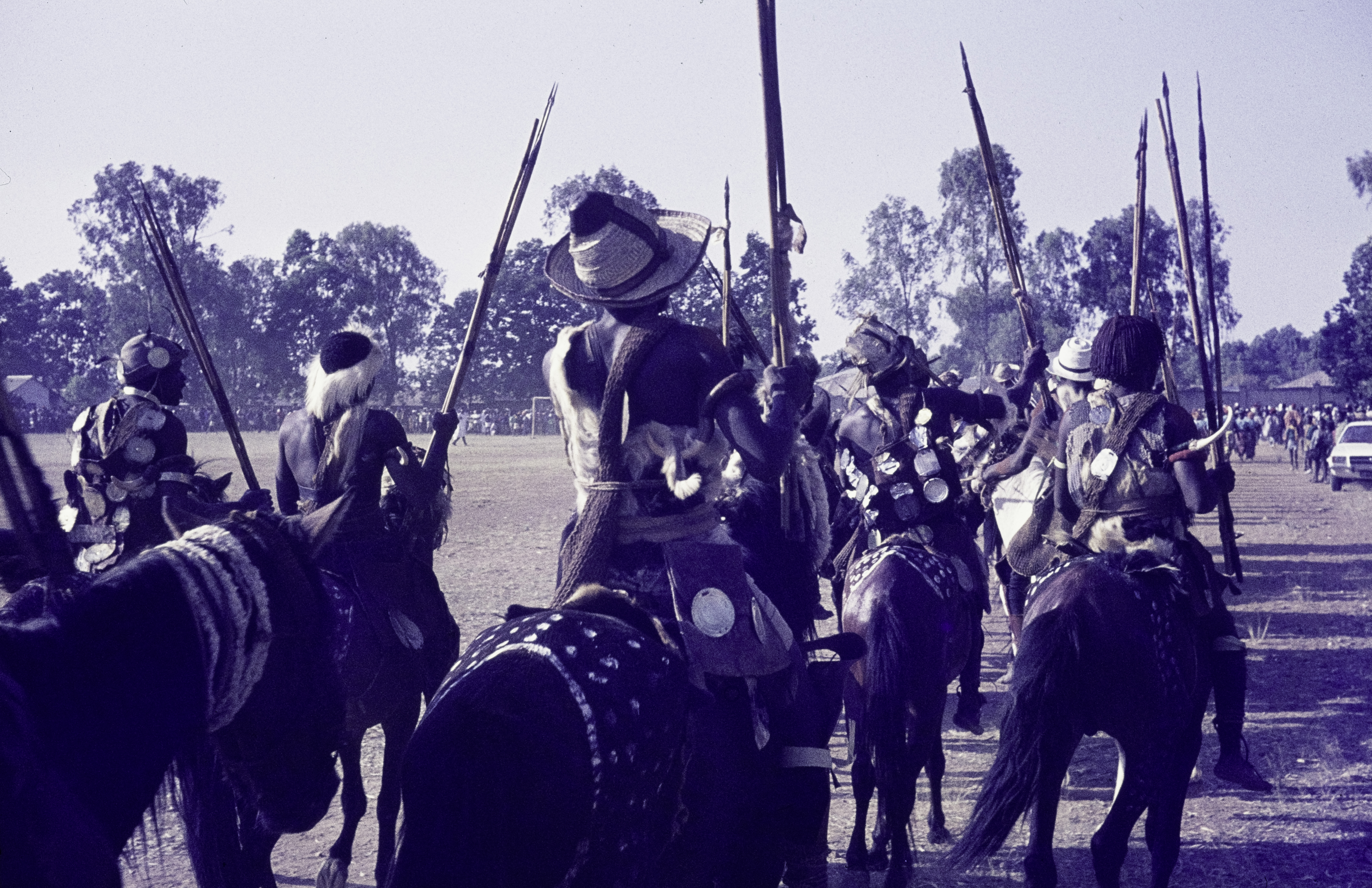
The Jos Ceremony. Horsemen with spears and sticks, 1970–1973.

== Notable people ==
- Third Nigerian Republic President-elect MKO Abiola was elected SDP flag bearer in Jos
- Yakubu Gowon, Nigeria's second military Head of state. Resides in Jos.
- Joseph Gomwalk†, First Governor of Plateau State.
- John Dungs†, residence; Rayfield, Jos.
- Jonah Jang, residence; Du.
- Davou Zang, residence; D. B. Zang junction, Gyel.
- Muhammadu Buhari, President of Nigeria and former GOC 3rd armoured division, of the Nigerian Army, Jos.
- Olusegun Obasanjo, ex Nigerian president was interned in the Nigerian Correctional Service, Jos during Sani Abacha's military junta. Obasanjo later won his PDP presidential ticket in Jos Polo Club.
- Solomon Lar†, residence beach road Jos.
- Michael Botmang†, residence Za'ang.
- Jeremiah Gyang, singer and producer based in Jos.
- Mabo Ismaila, Former coach of the female National Football Team, the Super Falcons
- Segun Odegbami, Nigerian footballer spent his childhood years in Jos
- Delmwa Deshi-Kura, Nigerian film production executive and director, known for her work in television and reality productions.
- Desmond Elliot, Nigerian actor, director and Member of the Lagos State House of Assembly
- Ahmed Musa, Nigerian footballer was born in Jos
- Bez (musician), Nigerian alternative soul singer was born and raised in Jos
- Doug Kazé, Nigerian alternative Afro-soul musician was born and raised in Jos
- Mikel John Obi, international footballer spent his childhood years in Jos
- Ogenyi Onazi, international footballer was born in Jos
- Sunday Mba, international footballer had his childhood years in Jos
- Joseph Akpala, international footballer was born in Jos
- Benedict Akwuegbu, international footballer had his childhood years in Jos
- Chibuzor Okonkwo, international footballer was born in Jos
- Ice Prince, Nigerian musical artist grew up in Jos
- Dayo Okeniyi, actor was born in Jos
- M.I, rapper born and raised in Jos
- Saint Obi, veteran Nollywood actor kicked off his career in Jos
- P-Square, Music duo of identical twin brothers Peter Okoye and Paul Okoye were born and raised in Jos.
- Innocent 'Tuface' Idibia Nigerian multi-award-winning musician was born in Jos
- Deborah Enilo Ajakaiye (born 1940), Nigerian geophysicist
- Sarah Ladipo Manyika (born 7 March 1968), British-Nigerian writer, spent much of her childhood in Lagos and Jos
- Tony Elumelu was born in Jos, Plateau State, Nigeria, in 1963. He hails from Onicha-Ukwu in Aniocha North Local Government Area of Delta State.
- Kenneth Gyang, filmmaker who was born in Barkin Ladi of Plateau State, Nigeria.
- John Major, former British Prime Minister, worked in the town from 1966 to 1967.
- Simon Bako Lalong, (born 1963) Nigerian politician and Governor of Plateau State from 2015 to 2023 and the senator representing the Plateau South senatorial district since 2023.
- Saviour Godwin (born 1996), footballer
- Ugochukwu Iwu, Born in Nigeria, he represents Armenia at international level.
- Asha was raised and schooled in Federal Government college, Jos

== See also ==
- Railway stations in Nigeria
