= Barkin Ladi =

Town in Plateau State, Nigeria

- LGA and town
- Nickname: b/ladi
- Interactive map of Barkin Ladi
- Location in Nigeria
- Coordinates: 9°34′N 8°55′E
- Country: Nigeria
- State: Plateau State

Government
  - Local Government Chairman: Stephen Gyang Pwajok
  - Gbong Gwom Jos (Head of Jos Joint Traditional Council of Chiefs [Barkin Ladi, Jos-South] & Plateau State Traditional Council of Chiefs, concurrently): Jacob Gyang Buba (incumbent)

Area
  - Total: 1,032 km^{2} (398 sq mi)

Population (2006 census)
  - Total: 175,267
  - Density: 169.8/km^{2} (439.9/sq mi)
- Time zone: UTC+1 (WAT)
- 3-digit postal code prefix: 932
- ISO 3166 code: NG.PL.BL

Barkin Ladi (or Barakin Ladi, B/ladi) is a town and Local Government Area in Plateau State, Nigeria.

It has an area of 1,032 km^{2} and a population of 175,267 at the 2006 census. Plateau state Polytechnic is Located in this town. The postal code of the area is 932.

== Climate/Geography ==
The rainy season in Barkin Ladi is hot and partially cloudy, whereas the dry season is warm, muggy, and cloudy. The average annual temperature is between 54 °F and 90 °F; it is rarely lower or higher than 49 °F or 96 °F.

The average daily maximum temperature during the 2.7-month hot season, which runs from January 30 to April 21, is above 86 °F. In Barkin Ladi, March is the hottest month of the year with an average high temperature of 90 °F and low temperature of 63 °F. Between July 1 and October 6, or 3.2 months, the average daily maximum temperature falls below 77 °F, marking the start of the chilly season. At an average low of 61 °F and high of 74 °F, August is the coldest month of the year in Barkin Ladi.

Barkin Ladi LGA is 1032 square kilometres or 398 square miles in size, with a 21 percent humidity level. At Barkin Ladi LGA, the average wind speed is 6 km/h, and the average air temperature is predicted to be 29 °C. Numerous rock formations are also strewn over Barkin Ladi's environment.

=== Cloud cover ===
Throughout the year, there is a noticeable seasonal change in Barkin Ladi's average percentage of cloud cover. In Barkin Ladi, the clearer portion of the year lasts 3.8 months, starting around November 4 and ending around February 28. In Barkin Ladi, January has the clearest sky of the year, with 54% of the sky being clear, mostly clear, or partly overcast on average. Starting about February 28 and lasting for 8.2 months, the cloudier portion of the year ends around November 4. May is the cloudiest month of the year in Barkin Ladi, with 84% of the sky being cloudy or mostly cloudy on average.
