= Jos South =

- LGA
- Interactive map of Jos South
- Location in Nigeria
- Coordinates: 9°46′N 8°48′E
- Country: Nigeria
- State: Plateau State
- Headquarters: Bukuru

Government
  - Local Government Chairman: Patrick Silas Dung
  - Gbong Gwom Jos (Head of Jos Joint Traditional Council of Chiefs [Barkin Ladi, Jos-South] & Plateau State Traditional Council of Chiefs, concurrently): Jacob Gyang Buba (incumbent)

Area
  - Total: 510 km^{2} (200 sq mi)

Population (2006 census)
  - Total: 506,716
  - Density: 604/km^{2} (1,560/sq mi)
- Time zone: UTC+1 (WAT)
- 3-digit postal code prefix: 930
- ISO 3166 code: NG.PL.JS

Jos South is a Local Government Area in Plateau State, Nigeria. It houses the Plateau State new Government house which includes the Office of the Executive Governor and other government house administrative offices and departments including Plateau State Information and Communication Technology Development Agency in Rayfield and can thus be described as the de facto capital of Plateau state. Its headquarters is located in Bukuru town on 9°48′00″N 8°52′00″E.

It has an area of 510 km^{2} and a population of 306,716 at the 2006 census. It is the second most populated Local Government Area in the state after Jos-North.

The postal code of the area is 930.

The current local government chairman is Mr Patrick Silas Dung. Most of the millionaires and top Government Officials including the Governor in the state live in south the state government house is located there. Institute found in Jos South are Karl Kumm University, NTA College, Plateau State Polytechnic Jos campus, TCNN, College of Health vom and National Institute of Policy and Strategic Studies kuru. The Nigerian Airforce Station Jos is located there, top hotels and lounge likes of crispan hotel, crest hotel, Jos city park, varlain park, Golden bite suits, Mees Palace and chillers by new Yorker are also located there.

== Climate/Geography ==
Jos South LGA has an average temperature of 28 degrees Celsius or 82.4 degrees Fahrenheit and a total area of 510 square kilometres or 200 square miles. The region experiences two distinct seasons, known as the dry and the wet seasons, with an annual total of 1,750 millimetres (69 inches) of precipitation. In Jos South LGA, the average wind speed is 11 kilometres per hour (6.8 mph).
