= Pyem people =

Ethnic group in Middle Belt, Nigeria

Pyem
Total population
- 25,000

Regions with significant populations
- Nigeria

Languages
- Pyem

Religion
- Islam, Christianity, Ethnic religion

Related ethnic groups
- Afizere, Irigwe, Berom, Ron

The Pyem people (Pyam; Hausa: Fyam, Genawa) are found mainly in Mangu Local Government Area of Plateau State, Middle Belt (central) Nigeria. They speak the Pyem language, a Plateau language. Their headquarters are in the town of Gindiri, about 51 km (32 mi) due southwest of the city of Jos.

== History ==
The Pyem people were said to have migrated from the Gobir Kingdom when Bawa Jangwarzo (1777-1795) reigned as king. The people left in two groups. One group established a settlement in Tulai, located southeast of Gindiri, and the second group in an area located in Bokkos.

The Pyem came from Gobir while a splinter group went to Lankan and later left again to Bokkos and founded the Ron.

— C.G. Ames., Reconstructing The Origins Of The Peoples Of Plateau State: Questioning The "We Are All Settlers" Theory., Journal of the Historical Society of Nigeria

In one of Ames' contexts, a part of the migrants migrated to Pengiji, founding the Pyem people. A part of the people then moved to Fier from Pengiji and intermarried with an offshoot of the Ngas people. Furthermore, a large portion of them subsequently left for Lankan, in Mupunland, and again journeyed through. From there, through Mwaghavulland and then settled finally in the Bokkos area where they became the Ron people.

== Demographics ==
=== Distribution ===
The Pyem people today are mainly found in the Pyem Chiefdom in Mangu Local Government Area, Plateau State, Nigeria. Some of their towns include Gindiri, Chanso, Kaduna, Pyem, Dyere (also Pengiji) and Badni.

=== Religion ===
According to Joshua Project, the Pyem people are 50% Muslim, 40% Christian, with 10% practicing ethnic religion.

== Language ==
The Pyem people speak a Plateau language related to Horom.

In 2018, the Ba-Pyam Azonci Association with support from some U.S. partners, commissioned the publication of books in Pyem to save it from going extinct. Examples of such books are Shalai na Waari na DePyam, "Reading and Writing in Pyem"; Beer, Kwor, Na Cikam Arye, "Relationship, Counting, Proverbs, Names, and Directions"; etc.

== Politics ==
=== History ===
The Pyem people were initially led by a priest-king, the Hwali-bwangha. The leadership Council had six members.

=== Present-day ===
Today, most Pyem people are located in the Pyem Chiefdom, with headquarters in the town of Gindiri. The Chiefdom is led by the Sum Pyem, who as of 2021 was Sum Charles Mato Dakat, a second class chief.

== Notable people ==
- Ibrahim Mantu (1947 – 2021), Nigerian deputy Senate President (2001 – 2007).
- Eliezer Paul-Gindiri, U.S. amateur golfer
- Ilijah Paul (b. 2002), U.S. soccer player
