= Barkul language =

Plateau language spoken in Nigeria

Barkul
- Bo-Rukul
- Kap amaBɔ, Kap maRukul
- Native to: Nigeria
- Region: Plateau State
- Native speakers: (2,000 cited 1999)
- Language family: Niger–Congo?: Atlantic–Congo; Benue–Congo; Plateau; East ?; Barkul
- Dialects: Bo (Mabo); Rukul

Language codes
- ISO 639-3: mae
- Glottolog: boru1244
- ELP: Rukul

Bo
- Person: amaBɔ
- People: baBɔ
- Language: Kap amaBɔ

Rukul
- Person: amaRukul
- People: baRukul
- Language: Kap maRukul

Barkul (Bo-Rukul) is a Plateau language of Barkul village, Bokkos LGA, Plateau State, Nigeria. The two dialects, Bo (or Mabo) and Rukul, each with 500–1,000 speakers, are notably distinct. The classification of Barkul is unclear, but it appears to be closest to Fyam and Horom.
