= Angas =

Angas may refer to:

== Places ==
- Angas, Iran, a village in Mazandaran Province, Iran
- Division of Angas (1903–1934), in Australia
- Division of Angas (1949–1977), in Australia
- Electoral district of Angas, in Australia
- River Angas, in Australia
- Angas Downs Indigenous Protected Area, in Australia

== Other uses ==
- Angas, a junior synonym for the moth genus now known as Actias
- Angas (surname)
- Angas people, an ethnic group of Nigeria
- Angas language, spoken in Nigeria
- Angas, inhabitants of the ancient Indian kingdom of Anga
- Jain Angas, subdivisions of Jain sacred texts

== See also ==
- Anga (disambiguation)
