= Vaghat =

Vaghat may refer to:

- Vaghat people
- Vaghat language
