= Anga (disambiguation) =

Anga was a kingdom on the eastern Indian subcontinent from c. 12th to 6th century BCE.

Anga may also refer to:

- Anga (name)
- Anga (region), a region in Bihar and Jharkhand, India
- Anga, Gotland, a settlement on the Swedish island of Gotland
- Anga people, an ethnic group in Nigeria
- Miguel "Angá" Díaz, Cuban percussionist
- Jain Anga, a 'department' of the Jain sacred texts, the Agamas
- Anga, the karuka tree in the Huli and Duna languages
- Anga, a fictional character in The Lion King franchise

== See also ==
- Angas (disambiguation)
- Ange (disambiguation)
- Angam (disambiguation)
