= Bashar, Plateau State =

Yangkam people and language in Nigeria

Bashar is a town and district in Wase Local Government Area (LGA), Plateau State, Nigeria. The town is located at approximately 9°18′46″N 10°09′29″E.

Bashar is predominantly inhabited by the Yankam people, who are reported to have gradually lost their indigenous language in favor of Hausa. The district lies in the southern part of Plateau State, within Wase LGA.

The traditional ruler of Bashar is known by the title Rekna, a designation rooted in the community's linguistic and cultural history. The town has an estimated population of 25,000 to 32,000.

Bashar was ruled by Alhaji Adamu Idris for 59 years and was assisted by his son, Yusuf Adamu Idris, in his later years. The Rekna of Bashar, Alhaji Adamu Idris, died at the age of 96 and was succeeded by his younger brother, Alhaji Abdullahi Idris Isa, the youngest member of the Rekna Alhaji Idris Isa family.

== Nomenclature ==
The Yangkam (Yaŋkam) people have been referred to as "Bashar" or "Basherawa" (a Hausanized version of the name) in most literature (Greenberg 1963; Williamson 1971; Benue-Congo Comparative Wordlist; Hansford et al. 1976; Gerhardt 1989; Crozier & Blench 1992). The name of the Bashar language and people is Yàŋkàm, with the plural form aYaŋkam. Although Yangkam has nearly disappeared as a language, the populations who formerly spoke it are likely to retain "Basherawa" and "Basheranci" as names for the people and the language, as long as they retain a separate identity.

== Location and settlements ==
The Yangkam live in a region west of Bashar town, 25 km north of Jarme on the Amper-Bashar road, in Kanam LGA, Plateau State. Yangkam is spoken in four villages: Tukur, Bayar, Pyaksam, and Kiram (CAPRO also mentions Gambam and Kwakkwani, but this has not been confirmed). There are many hamlets around Bashar town in Wase LGA whose populations are ethnically Yangkam but no longer speak the language. In two main cartographic sources, Hansford et al. (1976) and Blench & Crozier (1992), the location is inaccurate. Its location is indicated in the forthcoming Millennium edition of the Ethnologue (Grimes).

== Language status ==
Crozier and Blench (1992) give a figure of 20,000 speakers of the language located in and around Bashar town, approximately 50 km east of Amper on the Muri road. This estimate was later found to be inaccurate. The Bashar people appear to have been heavily affected by nineteenth-century slave raids, possibly carried out by the Jukun as well as the Hausa. They were converted to Islam, and a relatively powerful center was established at Bashar. At the same time, they began to switch to speaking Hausa while still retaining their Bashar identity. In the region of Bashar town today, only two elderly men in the village of Yuli, 15 km northwest of Bashar, remain reasonably fluent in the language. During this period, the population split into two groups, one of which sought refuge in Tukur. However, even here, Yangkam is spoken only by people over fifty, and all the younger people speak Hausa. The local estimate of fluent speakers is 100, and this number is declining each year. There appears to be little likelihood that Yangkam will be maintained, as speakers have shifted to Hausa while remaining proud of their historical identity.

== Yangkam culture ==
Before the Yangkam people embraced Islam, their traditional customs and religion were closely related to those of the Boghom people. Before marriage, the suitor had to serve the in-laws on the farm, provide a hand-woven white cloth (alikyala), carry out building and roofing work, and give animals as a bride-price. Yangkam burial rites were similar to those of the Boghom. They formerly removed the skull of the deceased for observation three months after burial. Naming and circumcision rites were formerly similar to those of the Boghom, although today these rites are performed according to Islamic law. The Yangkam and the Boghom share the same name for the supreme being, Bappi, and formerly had masquerades and shrines. Today, these practices have fallen into disuse following conversion to Islam. Although Christianity was introduced to the Yangkam in 1968 by Bala Abdu, a COCIN evangelist, it was rejected. When some non-Yangkam residents accepted the gospel, the chief was reluctant to grant them land to build a place of worship.
