= Kulere language =

Afro-Asiatic language of Nigeria

Kulere
- Native to: Plateau Nassarawa Nigeria
- Region: Bokkos, Plateau State
- Native speakers: (16,000 cited 1990)
- Language family: Afro-Asiatic: Chadic; West Chadic; Ron; Kulere

Language codes
- ISO 639-3: kul
- Glottolog: kule1247

Kulere (also known as Tof, Korom Boye, Akandi, Akande, Kande) is an Afro-Asiatic language spoken in Bokkos, Plateau State, and in some parts of Wamba in Nassarawa State, Nigeria.
