= Sha language =

Afro-Asiatic language spoken in Nigeria

Sha
- Native to: Nigeria
- Region: Plateau State
- Native speakers: (3,000 cited 1998)
- Language family: Afro-Asiatic: Chadic; West Chadic; Bole–Angas; Ron (A.4); Sha

Language codes
- ISO 639-3: scw
- Glottolog: shaa1247
- ELP: Sha

Sha, also spelled Sya, is an Afro-Asiatic language spoken in Plateau State and Kaduna State, Nigeria. As of 2018, the language is used for face-to-face communication and lacks a standardized written form. It is spoken by approximately 1,000 people and is considered sustainable.

The primary area where Sha is spoken is in Sha District, Bokkos LGA, Plateau State. Mundat, a closely related language also belonging to the Chadic A.4 branch, is spoken in Mundat village within the same district.
