= Mundat =

Mundat may be,

- Mundat Forest of Europe
- Mundat language of Nigeria
