= College of Education, Gindiri =

Higher education institution in Nigeria

Coordinates: 9.569°N 9.198°E

- Type: Public
- Established: 1989
- Provost: Emmanuel Jurte
- Location: Mangu, Plateau State, Nigeria
- Affiliations: Ahmadu Bello University
- Website: Official website

The College of Education, Gindiri is a state government higher education institution located in Mangu, Plateau State, Nigeria. It is affiliated to University of Jos for its degree programmes. The current acting provost is Emmanuel Jurte.

== History ==
The College of Education, Gindiri, was established vide Plateau State Edict No. 26 of 1980.

== Courses ==
The institution offers the following courses:

- Chemistry Education
- Education and Economics
- Business Education
- Education and Geography
- Primary Education Studies
- History
- Fine And Applied Arts
- Cultural and Creative Art
- Education and French
- Early Childhood Care Education
- Islamic Studies
- Education and Mathematics
- Political Science
- Computer Education
- Education and English
- Biology Education
- Hausa
- Christian Religious Studies
- Home Economics
- Integrated Science
- Agricultural Science
- Technical Education
- Computer Education
- Theatre Arts
- Physical And Health Education

== Affiliation ==
The institution is affiliated with the Ahmadu Bello University, Zaria, to offer programmes leading to Bachelor of Education, (B.Ed.).
