= Angam =

Angam may refer to:

- Angam (1983 film), an Indian Malayalam film
- Angam (2011 film), a Sri Lankan documentary film

== See also ==
- Anga (disambiguation)
