= Mangar language =

Mangar may refer to varieties of the following languages:

- Mangar language (Nepal), a Sino-Tibetan language of Nepal
- Mangar language (Nigeria), a variety of the Afro-Asiatic Ron language of Nigeria
