= The Emigrated Birds =

- Poster of The Emigrated Birds, 2013
- pe: پرند ه های مهاجر
- Directed by: Shahram Qadir
- Written by: Shahram Qadir
- Produced by: Shahram Qadir
- Starring: Mehrdad Khosravani; Saeed Riasatian; Peyman Ebrahimi; Romina Gholami
- Cinematography: Shahram Qadir
- Edited by: Shahram Qadir
- Music by: Yara Zavareh; Alexander Tancredi
- Release date: 2013
- Running time: 107 minutes
- Country: Sweden
- Language: Persian

The Emigrated Birds (Persian: پرند ه های مهاجر), is a 2013 Persian-language Swedish film produced, written and directed by Shahram Qadir.

== Cast ==
- Mehrdad Khosravani ... Makan
- Saeed Riasatian ... Diako
- Romina Gholami ... Roxana
- Peyman Ebrahimi ... Pezhman
- Sitra Zerang ... Kazhal
- Hedyie Shahidi ... Maryam
- Sara Heydari ... Sara
- Nadja ... Farzaneh

== Music ==
Creator	Instrument	Time
Yara Zavareh	Piano	18:43
Alexander Tancredi	Piano	10:52
Pedram Shahlai	Violon	8:48
Ramin Rahimi	Daf	0:58
Moshtagh Feizyabi	Daf	1:52
