= Jerry Mallo =

Nigerian Inventor

Jerry Isaac Mallo
- Born: July 20, 1994 (age 31); Plateau State, Nigeria
- Citizenship: Nigerian
- Education: University of Hertfordshire
- Occupations: Fabrication engineer and entrepreneur
- Known for: Founder and CEO of Bennie Technologies Ltd; Creator of the "Bennie Purrie", Nigeria's first carbon-fibre sports car

Jerry Isaac Mallo (born 20 July 1994) is a Nigerian engineer, inventor, and entrepreneur. He is the founder and CEO of "Bennie Technologies Ltd", also known as Bennie Automobile, and is best known for creating the "'Bennie Purrie'", Nigeria's first carbon-fibre sports car, which he unveiled in November 2019.

He also developed prototype ventilators during the COVID-19 pandemic to help alleviate shortages of medical equipment.

In 2021 he was recognised for his entrepreneurship at the 16th edition of The Future Awards Africa and winner of Nigeria maiden edition of The National Micro, Small and Medium Enterprise Awards in Nigeria.

== Early life and education ==
Jerry was born in Kunet, Bokkos LGA, Plateau State, Nigeria in 1994, where he developed an early interest in mechanics in a farming community with limited resources. As a child, he experimented with discarded materials to build tools and machines, including a maize thresher during junior secondary school and a basic car after graduation. He briefly studied mechanical engineering at the University of Nigeria, Nsukka, before leaving to focus on practical innovation. A sponsorship later enabled him to train in automotive engineering at the University of Hertfordshire in the UK.

== Career ==
=== Bennie Technologies Ltd ===
Mallo is the founder and Chief Executive Officer of Bennie Technologies Ltd, also known as Bennie Automobile or Bennie Agro, an engineering firm based in Jos, Plateau State, Nigeria. He established the company in 2016 after returning from the United Kingdom, initially focusing on locally built agricultural equipment before expanding into automotive innovation.

=== Agricultural machinery and innovations ===
Early in his career, Mallo focused on developing machines to address local agricultural challenges. His company designed and built Nigeria's first locally fabricated tractor, as well as equipment for planting, harvesting, de-stoning, threshing, milling, and peeling staple crops such as maize, cassava, and rice. He also created solar-powered irrigation systems aimed at improving agricultural productivity in rural communities.

The company received recognition in 2018 when it won Nigeria’s National Micro, Small and Medium Enterprises (MSME) Award, which included a ₦1 million cash prize and institutional support to scale production.

=== COVID-19 ventilator innovation ===
During the COVID-19 pandemic in 2020, Mallo and his team developed prototype ventilators using locally sourced materials to help address the shortage of medical equipment in Nigeria. The Plateau State Government provided technical support and funding. Clinical testing confirmed that the prototypes showed potential for wider production with further refinement.

=== The Bennie Purrie ===
On 28 November 2019, Mallo unveiled the Bennie Purrie, Nigeria’s first carbon-fibre sports car, at the Transcorp Hilton in Abuja. The vehicle features a lightweight carbon-fibre body mounted on a tubular steel chassis, a 2.0-litre, 130 hp engine, and a four-radiator cooling system designed for performance in hot climates. Mallo stated that the design aimed to provide both safety and durability, noting that carbon fibre shatters on impact rather than deforming inward, reducing risk to passengers.

At the unveiling, he emphasized the potential of Africa’s market for luxury cars and the importance of supporting local manufacturing to harness the skills of Nigerian artisans.
