= Kwanka language =

Dialect of Nigeria

Kadung
- Kadun
- Native to: Nigeria
- Region: Plateau State, Bauchi State
- Native speakers: 20,000 (2003)
- Language family: Niger–Congo?: Atlantic–Congo; Volta–Congo; Benue–Congo; Plateau; Tarokoid; Kadung
- Dialects: Kadung (Kadun); Ya (Boi); Bijim (incl. Legeri)

Language codes
- ISO 639-3: Variously: jbm – Bijim dkg – Kadung tyy – Tiyaa
- Glottolog: vagh1247

Kadung, or Kadun (Kwaŋ), is a dialect cluster of Plateau languages in Nigeria.

== Varieties ==
Vaghat
- Person: Vaghat
- People: Avaghat
- Language: Tivaghat

Ya
- Person: Ya
- People: Aya
- Language: Tiya

Kadung or Kadun is the main variety. Others are Ya (Tiyaa) and Bijim.

Vaghat is perceived as distinct from Kadung. Mutual intelligibility between Vaghat/Kadung, Ya and Bijim is fairly low. Kadung and Bijim are more closely related to each other, while Yaa is more divergent.

Kadung and Ya are endonyms, with loconyms Kadung and Kadun and Boi for Ya.

== Distribution ==
The main settlements are Chinpyàk, Kwànkà, Làrkà, Bùkòʃì, Wùyà, Gileŋ, Kùmbùl, Kaduŋ, Wùʃìmà, ɗə̀kdèy, Kwándarì, Rɔ̀k, Jàrkàn, Dùfyàm, Amusha, and others. They are located in Pankshin LGA and Mangu LGA, Plateau State. Surrounding languages are Mwaghavul, Ngas, Pyem, and Fulani.

=== Vaghat ===
The Vaghat originally lived in the following hill settlements in Tafawa Balewa and Bogoro LGAs in southwestern Bauchi State.

- Akusha
- Anjere (no longer inhabited)
- Aruti
- Dala
- Goŋzi
- Gwoɓi (no longer inhabited). There is a cave where the skulls of Vaghat ancestors are kept.
- Kaduk (no longer inhabited)
- Kudal (central village where the chief lived)
- Kwafa
- Maŋgar
- Yaghap
- Yalas
- Yaŋ
- Yɔghɔs (Yaush)
- Yise
- Zhindir

Today, the Vaghat have also moved to many towns and settlements spread across Bauchi State, Plateau State, and Kaduna State (mostly near Zaria).

Vaghat highland clans are: Āyàlàs, Àyìtūr, Àtòròk, Āyīpàɣí, Āyīgònì, Àyàkdàl, Àyánàvēr, Āyàtōl, Àyàʒíkʔìn, Àyìʤìlìŋ, Áyàshàlà, and Àzàrā.

Vaghat lowland clans are: Āyàlàs, Àyàkdàl, Àyàʒíkʔìn, Àyàgwàr, and Àyàgyēr.

The Vaghat people also have a cave in a mountain where they keep the skulls of their ancestors.
