= KBZ =

The abbreviation KBZ may refer to:

- Kaikoura Aerodrome on the South Island of New Zealand (IATA code)
- Kreditna banka Zagreb, see List of banks in Croatia

The abbreviation kbz may refer to:

- Duhwa language, Afro-Asiatic language spoken in Nasarawa State, Nigeria (ISO 639-3)

KBZ may also refer to:

- Air KBZ, privately owned domestic Burmese airline
