= Vaghat people =

Ethnic group in Bauchi State, Nigeria

Vaghat
Total population
- 20,000+ (2022)

Regions with significant populations
- Plateau and Bauchi States (Nigeria)

Languages
- Vaghat

Religion
- Traditional African religion, Christianity

Related ethnic groups
- Tarok, Berom, Atyap, and other Middle Belt peoples

The Vaghat people are an ethnic group who traditionally inhabited just over a dozen villages in the hills of Tafawa Balewa and Bogoro LGAs in southwestern Bauchi State, Nigeria. Today, the Vaghat have also moved to many towns and settlements spread across Bauchi State, Plateau State, and Kaduna State (mostly near Zaria). They speak the Vaghat language, one of the Tarokoid languages with over 20,000 speakers.

== Clans ==
Vaghat highland clans are: Āyàlàs, Àyìtūr, Àtòròk, Āyīpàɣí, Āyīgònì, Àyàkdàl, Àyánàvēr, Āyàtōl, Àyàʒíkʔìn, Àyìʤìlìŋ, Áyàshàlà, and Àzàrā.

Vaghat lowland clans are: Āyàlàs, Àyàkdàl, Àyàʒíkʔìn, Àyàgwàr, and Àyàgyēr.

== Religion ==
Traditional Vaghat religion consists of belief in:

- Vi Matur, the universal deity (literally 'sun above')
- Àdàmōrā, the ancestors
- Reincarnation, tya mi karam
- Spirits, woni

The Vaghat people also have shrines, called gataŋ mishiri.

== Society ==
In Vaghat traditional society, positions of authority are:

- ru ma daghal - secular chief
- da mishiri (suŋgwari) - chief priest
- maaji (da ma ayokon) - deputy to the chief
- maɗaki - advisor to the chief
- turaki - advisor to the chief
- igomor - chief of the warriors
- fan shen (faye ma apal) - chief seer

== Burials ==
The Vaghat people have a cave in a mountain where they keep the skulls of their ancestors.
