= Tarok language =

Benue-Congo language spoken in northern Nigeria

Tarok
- iTárók
- Native to: Nigeria
- Region: Plateau State, Taraba State
- Ethnicity: Tarok
- Native speakers: 520,000 (2020)
- Language family: Niger–Congo?: Atlantic–Congo; Benue–Congo; Plateau; Tarokoid; Tarok–Pai; Tarok

Language codes
- ISO 639-3: yer
- Glottolog: taro1263

Tarok (Tarok: iTárók), also known as Yergam^{a} or Appa is a language spoken by around 520,000 people primarily in the southeast of Nigeria's Plateau State, where it serves as a local lingua franca. Tarok is a member of the Plateau group of the Atlantic–Congo family.

== Phonology ==
=== Vowels ===
Tarok has seven phonemic vowels, /i ɨ u ɛ ə ɔ a/. The IPA symbols are included in the table below along with the orthographic form in angular brackets.

Tarok Vowels
	Front	Central	Back
High	i ⟨i⟩	ɨ ⟨ə⟩	u ⟨u⟩
Low-Mid	ɛ ⟨e⟩	ə ⟨a̱⟩	ɔ ⟨o⟩
Low		a ⟨a⟩	

=== Consonants ===
Tarok has an inventory of twenty-nine phonemic consonants, shown in the table below. Allophones are provided in parentheses.

Tarok Consonants
		Labial	Alveolar	Palato- alveolar	Palatal	Velar	Labiovelar	Glottal
Plosive / Affricate	voiceless	p	t	t͡ʃ		k	k͡p	ʔ
Plosive / Affricate	voiced	b	d	d͡ʒ		g	g͡b	
Implosive		ɓ	ɗ					
Fricative	voiceless	f	s	ʃ				h
Fricative	voiced	v	z	ʒ		ɣ		
Nasal		m	n		ɲ	ŋ	(ŋ͡m)*	
Lateral			l					
Vibrant			r					
Semivowel					j		w	

* The labiovelar nasal [ŋ͡m] occurs as an allophone of the syllabic nasal consonant before labiovelar plosives /k͡p/ and /g͡b/.

== Names for other languages ==
As the local lingua franca, the Tarok feature prominently in the local ethnic composition of southeast Plateau State. Many Tarok clans can also trace their ancestries back to Chadic-speaking peoples, pointing to a long history of Chadic peoples assimilating into Tarok society. Some Tarok names for neighbouring languages according to Longtau (2004):

Language	Classification	Tarok name
Ngas	West Chadic A.3	Dúk
Boghom	West Chadic B.3	Burom
Duguri	Jarawan	Duguri
Goemai	West Chadic A.3	Lar
Jukun-Wase	Jukunoid	Jor
Kanam	West Chadic B.3 ?	(not known by Tarok)
Kantana	Jarawan	Kantana
Tel	West Chadic A.3	Dwal
Pe	Tarokoid	Pe
Tal	West Chadic A.3	Tal
Sur	Tarokoid	(not known by Tarok)
Yangkam	Tarokoid	Yangkam
Yiwom	West Chadic A.3	Zhan
Zaar	West Chadic B.3	Zhim

== Orthography ==
Tarok alphabet
a	a̲	b	ɓ	c	d	ɗ	e	ǝ	f	gb
gh	i	j	k	kp	l	m	n	ny	ŋ	o
p	r	s	sh	t	u	v	w	y	z	zh

== Notes ==
Variants of this name are Yergəm and Yergum.
