= Tarokoid languages =

Branch of the Plateau language family spoken in central Nigeria

Tarokoid
- Plateau VII
- Geographic distribution: Nigeria
- Linguistic classification: Niger–Congo?: Atlantic–Congo; Benue–Congo; Central Nigerian (Platoid); Plateau; Tarokoid

Language codes
- Glottolog: taro1265

The five Tarokoid languages are a branch of the Plateau family spoken in central Nigeria, just north of the middle reaches of the Benue River. Tarok itself has 300,000 speakers, with Pe and Sur about 5,000 each. Yangkam is severely endangered, being spoken by around fifty elderly men.

The Tarokoid languages have significantly influenced the Ron languages and later Ngas, but not the other West Chadic languages of Tel, Goemai, Mupun, and Mwaghavul. Most borrowed words went from Tarok to Chadic, although occasionally Chadic words were also borrowed into Tarok. Today, Tarok remains the lingua franca of the southern Plateau region of Nigeria.

== Classification ==
The only language with significant data is Tarok. Pe (Pai) has been placed in various branches of Plateau, and Kwang (Kwanka) was only recently added, but it now seems clear that the following five languages belong together. The classification below follows Blench (2004).

- Tarokoid
  - - - Tarok (Yergam)
      - Pe (Pai)
    - Yangkam (Bashar)
  - - Sur (Myet, Tapshin)
    - Kwang (Kwanka)
    - Shall-Zwall

== Names and locations ==
Below is a list of Tarokoid language names, populations, and locations from Blench (2019).

Language	Dialects	Alternate spellings	Own name for language	Endonym(s)	Other names (location-based)	Other names for language	Exonym(s)	Speakers	Location(s)
Tarok	iTarok (Plain Tarok), iZini (Hill Tarok), Səlyər, iTarok Oga aSa, iGyang		iTarok			Appa, Yergam, Yergum			Plateau State, Langtang and Wase LGAs
Yangkam				Yaŋkam	Bashiri		Basharawa	[20,000 (1977 Voegelin and Voegelin)]. Ethnic population given; these groups now speak only Hausa. As of 1996, there were likely fewer than 400 speakers, all over 40 years old.	Plateau State, Langtang and Wase LGAs, Bashar town

== Reconstruction ==
Reconstructed Proto-Tarokoid forms proposed by Longtau (2016):

Gloss	Proto-Tarokoid
to burn	*bi-ʃi
head	*iki-ʃi
tongue	*iki-lerem ~ *iti-lem
to monger iron	*kɨ-la
bed	*iki-ler
tail	*iku-ʃol
hyena	*mmu-tuŋ
duiker	*in-tep
guinea fowl	*iru-nshyok
ladder	*n-kwaŋ
fonio	*iti-ʃi
head-pad	*ati-kat
knee	*itu-kuruŋ
bone	*atu-kubi
corpse	*atu-kum
skin	*a-tukwa
heart	*itun-rum
money	*igi-ʧam
fruit bat	*igi-gyak
husband	*u-rom
termite	*i-ʃum
hunger	*y-yɔŋ
