= Fyer language =

West Chadic language of Nigeria

Fyer
- Native to: Nigeria
- Region: Plateau State
- Native speakers: (26,000 cited 2000)
- Language family: Afro-Asiatic: Chadic; West Chadic; Bole–Angas; Ron (A.4); Fyer

Language codes
- ISO 639-3: fie
- Glottolog: fyer1241

Fyer (also known as Fier) is a West Chadic language spoken in Plateau State, Nigeria.

== Notes ==
The Fyer tribe has a population of approximately 35,000 people. It is an endangered ethnic group with a declining knowledge of its culture and language.
