= Ron languages =

West Chadic language group of Nigeria

Ron
- Ron–Fyer
- Geographic distribution: Mangu LGA, Plateau State, Nigeria
- Linguistic classification: Afro-Asiatic: Chadic; West Chadic; Ron
- Proto-language: Proto-Ron
- Subdivisions: Ron; Fyer

Language codes
- Glottolog: west2716
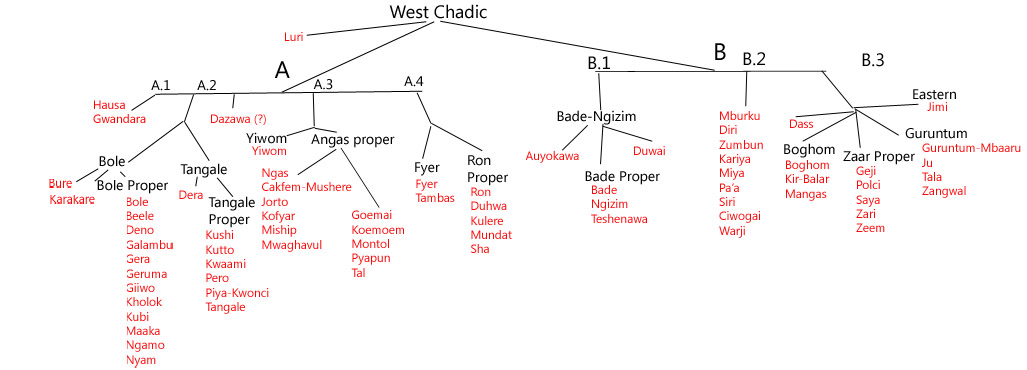
- West Chadic per Newman (1977)

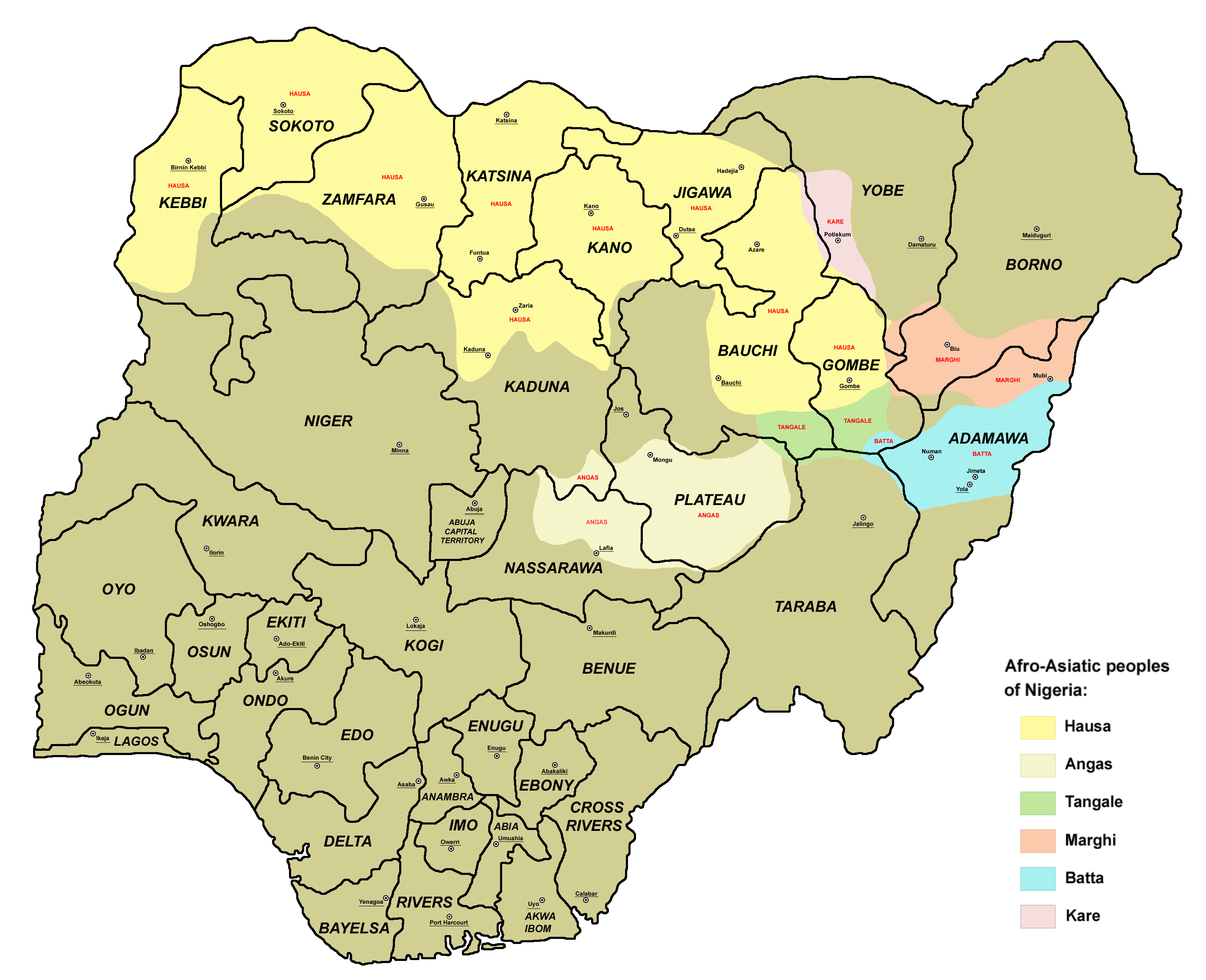
Main Chadic-speaking peoples in Nigeria

The Ron, Ronic or Ron–Fyer languages, group A.4 of the West Chadic branch of the Afro-Asiatic language family, are spoken in Plateau State, north-central Nigeria.

The Ron languages have undergone extensive influence from Tarok.

== Languages ==
The Ron languages, and their tentative relationships, are:

Ron

- Fyer, Tambas
- (branch)
  - Central Ron
    - Daffo-Mbar-Butura
    - Bokkos
    - Monguna (Shagawu) [perhaps actually closer to Sha]
  - Sha
  - Mangar
  - Mundat–Karfa
    - Mundat
    - Karfa (Duhwa)
  - Kulere (Richa)

Blench (2019) groups the following in the (Central) Ron/Run dialect cluster: Bokkos, Mbar, Daffo–Butura, Manguna, Mangar, Sha. Ɗimang and Mingah, both spoken near Bokkos LGA, are Ron languages that are also later reported by Blench.

While noting that Ron is in fact a complex linkage, Blench (2003) rejects two of the connections proposed in Seibert (1998) [Sha with Mundat–Karfa and Mangar with Kulere/Richa]:

- Northern: Fyer, Tambas
- Central: Bokkos, Daffo-Mbar-Butura, Monguna
- Western: Sha, Mundat, Karfa
- Southern: Richa, Mangar

== Names and locations ==
Below is a comprehensive list of Ron language names, populations, and locations from Blench (2019).

Language	Cluster	Dialects	Alternate spellings	Own name for language	Other names (based on location)	Other names for language	Exonym(s)	Speakers	Location(s)
Fyer			Fier					1,500 (1970); 10,000 (Blench 1999)	Plateau State, Mangu LGA
Karfa		Shagau	Kerifa	Duhwa	Karfa	Duhwa	Challa	800 (SIL 1973)	Plateau State, Bokkos LGA
Kulere		Tof, Richa, Kamwai: the latter includes Marahai (Marhai)		Akande (Kamwaĩ, Àkàndí (Tof), Kande (Richa)	Tof, Richa, Kamwai	Korom Ɓoye		6,500 (1925 Meek); 4,933 (1943 Ames); 8,000 (1973 SIL)	Plateau State, Bokkos LGA
Mundat		Mundat	Ron	Mundat	Mundat	Mundat			Plateau State, Bokkos LGA
Shagawu			Shagau		Anguna, Hurti, Ahurum, Ambwash, Gbwendeng, Nzuhwe (Duhwa)	Anguna Shagau		20,000 (SIL)	Plateau State, Bokkos LGA
Tambas			Tembis					3,000 (SIL)	Plateau State, Pankshin LGA
Run cluster	Run	Bokkos and Daffo–Mbar-Butura are more closely related than Sha	Ron	Run			Challa, Cala, Chala, Challawa	13,120 (1934 Ames); 60,000 (1985 UBS)	Plateau State, Bokkos LGA
Run Bokkos	Run	Bokkos, Baron		Lis ma Run	Bokos		Challa, Cala		
Run Daffo–Mbar-Butura	Run	Daffa, Mbar, Butura	Ron	Alis I Run	Batura	Mbar-wuh	Challa		
Manguna	Run	Manguna, Hurti, Dambwash, Mahurum, Gwande, Karfa(Duhwa)	Ron	Shagau	Anguna, Hurti, Duhwa, Agbwendeng, Ambwash, Ahurum	Anguna Shagau	Challa	20,000 (SIL)	Plateau State, Bokkos LGA
Mangar	Run								Plateau State, Bokkos LGA
Sha	Run							500 (SIL); about 1,000 (1970 Jungraithmayr)	Plateau State, Bokkos LGA

== Reconstruction ==
Proto-Ron
- Reconstruction of: Ron languages

Since the Ron languages form a diverse linkage, Ron reconstruction is not straightforward due to the lack of neat sound correspondences. There are many borrowings from neighbouring Niger-Congo Plateau languages that Ron had assimilated or been in contact with.

Proto-Ron reconstructions by Roger Blench are as follows.

No.	English	Proto-Ron
1.	person	*naaf
7.	friend	**mwin
19.	name	*sum
45.	flesh	*lo
46.	head	*hay
49.	bone	*kaʃ
53.	ear	*kumu
54.	nose	**atin
57.	mouth	*fo
59.	tongue	*liʃ
61.	tooth	*haŋgor
62.	molar	*ɓukum
64.	chin	*njumut
69.	throat	*goroŋ
72.	breast (female)	*fofo
73.	chest	*cin
79.	navel	**mutuk
83.	elbow	*kukwat
91.	thigh	*for
107.	saliva, spittle	*lyal
110.	urine	*sar
190.	I	*yin
238.	crocodile	**haram
1072.	blow (mouth)	*fuɗ
1089.	call (summon)	*lahyal
1157.	fall	*fur
1218.	land	**nɗoro
1241.	meet	*tof
1249.	open (door)	*ɓwali
1276.	put	*kin

== Morphology ==
Plurals of nouns in Ron languages are typically formed with -a- infixes.
