= Anga (name) =

Anga is a gender-neutral given name that may also be a surname. It's believed to mean sky; weather and is Swahili in origin.

Notable people with the name include:

Given name

- Anga Makubalo (born 1989), South African actor and musician

Surname

- Dai Anga, wet-nurse of the Mughal Emperor Shah Jahan
- Maham Anga (died 1562), foster mother and wet-nurse of the Mughal emperor Akbar
- Pierre Anga (1940–1988), Congolese army officer and rebel leader

== See also ==
- Angas (surname)
