= Pe language =

Plateau language of Nigeria

Pe
- Pai
- Native to: Nigeria
- Region: Plateau State
- Native speakers: 4,000 (2003)
- Language family: Niger–Congo?: Atlantic–Congo; Benue–Congo; Plateau; Tarokoid; Tarok–Pai; Pe

Language codes
- ISO 639-3: pai
- Glottolog: peee1238

Pè
- Person: ùPè
- People: áPè

Pe, also spelled Pai or Pye, is a minor Plateau language of southeastern Plateau State, Nigeria. It is classified as a Tarokoid language by Roger Blench (2023).

In 2019, Blench observed that Pe was being spoken by all generations, including children.

== Names ==
Pai is the Hausa pronunciation of Pe. Dalong is a pejorative name for Pe that is used by the Angas.

== Geographical distribution ==
Pe villages are located southeast of Pankshin town. Tal and Tarok are spoken to the east, and Teel (also called Montol) is spoken to the south. As a result, many adults also speak those languages. Ngas is spoken by almost all adults as well. Blench (2004) listed Dok (Dokpai) (main village), Tipap Kwi, Tipap Re, Bwer, Kup (=Tiniŋ), Ban, Kwasam, and Kamcik. Other villages, listed in CAPRO (2004), which Blench considers to be unconfirmed, are Yong, Jak, Bil, Bwai, Wopti, Kanchi, and Yuwan.

== Phonology ==
Pe has six vowels: /i, e, a, ə, o, u/. The language also has diphthongs.
