= Angas (surname) =

Angas is a surname. Notable people with the surname include:

- Caleb Angas (1782–1860), English agriculturist
- Charles Howard Angas (1861–1928), pastoralist in South Australia, son of John Howard Angas
- George Fife Angas (1789–1879), English businessman and banker, later prominent in South Australia
- George French Angas (1822–1886), English explorer, naturalist and painter, son of George Fife Angas
- John Howard Angas (1823–1904), South Australian pastoralist, politician and philanthropist, son of George Fife Angas
- Keith Angas (1900–1977), South Australian pastoralist, son of Charles Howard Angas
- Richard Angas (1942–2013), British operatic bass singer
- Sarah Lindsay Angas (1816–1898), South Australian temperance activist, daughter of George Fife Angas
- William Henry Angas (1781–1832), English missionary
