= Tambas language =

West Chadic language of Nigeria

Tambas
- Native to: Nigeria
- Region: Plateau State
- Native speakers: 2,000 (2019)
- Language family: Afro-Asiatic: Chadic; West Chadic; Bole–Angas; Ron (A.4); Tambas

Language codes
- ISO 639-3: tdk
- Glottolog: tamb1267

Tambas (also known as Tambes, Tembis) is a West Chadic language spoken in Plateau State, Nigeria.
