= East Plateau languages =

East Plateau
- Plateau VI
- Geographic distribution: Nigeria
- Linguistic classification: Niger–Congo?: Atlantic–Congo; Benue–Congo; Plateau; East Plateau

Language codes
- ISO 639-3: –
- Glottolog: sout2800

East or Southeast Plateau are a "probable" group of three Plateau languages spoken in Nigeria. Fyam and Horom are closely related; connections to Barkul (Bo-Rukul) are more problematic.

- East Plateau
  - - Fyam
    - Horom
  - ? Barkul

== Names and locations ==
Below is a list of language names, populations, and locations from Blench (2019).

| Language | Alternate spellings | Own name for language | Endonym(s) | Other names (location-based) | Other names for language | Speakers | Location(s) |
|---|---|---|---|---|---|---|---|
| Pyam | Fyem, Pyem, Paiem, Fem, Pem | | | | | 7,700 (1952 W&B); 14,000 (1973 SIL) | Plateau State, Jos, Barkin Ladi and Mangu LGAs |
| Bo-Rukul | Mabo–Barkul | | | Mabol, Barukul | Kulere; Kaleri (erroneous) | | Plateau State, Mangu LGA, Richa district |
| Horom | | Barom | Barom | | Kaleri (erroneous) | 500 (1973 SIL); 1000 (Blench 1998) | Plateau State, Mangu LGA. One village and one hamlet |
