= Shahram Qadir =

Iranian filmmaker, screenwriter, and photographer

Shahram Qadir شهرام قادر
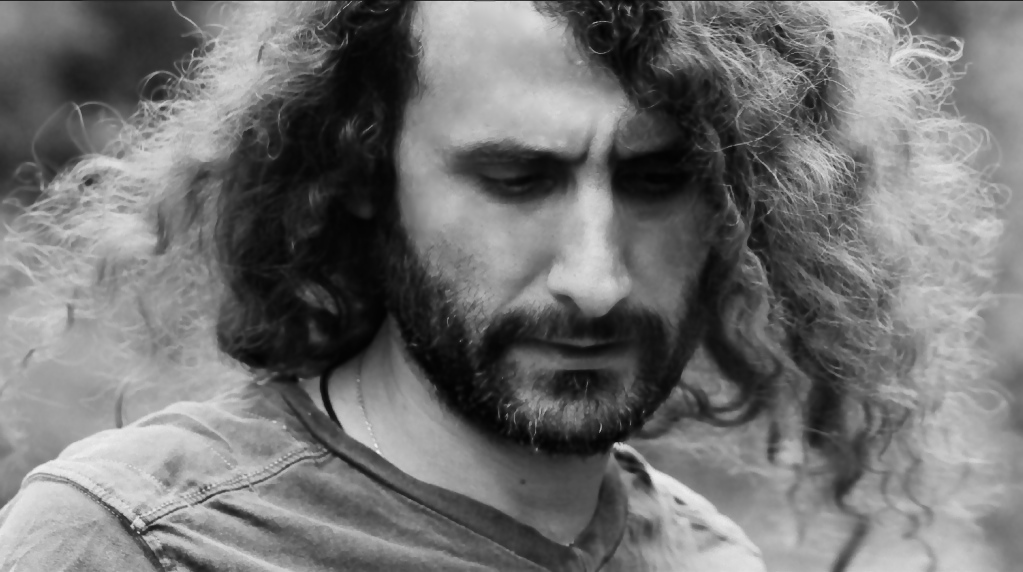
- Occupation: Filmmaker
- Years active: 2005–present

Shahram Qadir (Persian: شهرام قادر) is an Iranian filmmaker, screenwriter, and photographer. He grew up in Iran in Teheran, Qom, and West Azerbaijan. Shahram lives in Sweden since 1992. He is a master graduate of Södertörn University in Art and Art History in Sweden.

== Filmography ==
Film	Date	
Sarab	2005	Short film
The Confessor	2007	Short film
Seeking The Voice	2007	Documentary film
Iranian Anger and Love	2009	Documentary film
Fathe Shab	2010	Documentary film
The Emigrated Birds	2012	Feature Film
I Named You Afarin	2014	Feature Film
Cry of the Sky	2018	Feature Film
