= Sur–Myet language =

Plateau language spoken in Nigeria

Sur–Myet
- Tapshin
- kìsúr
- Native to: Nigeria
- Region: Bauchi State, Plateau State
- Native speakers: 16,000 (2021)
- Language family: Niger–Congo?: Atlantic–Congo; Benue–Congo; Plateau; Tarokoid; Sur–Myet
- Dialects: Sur; Myet

Language codes
- ISO 639-3: tdl
- Glottolog: surr1238
- ELP: Sur

Súr
- Person: nSúr
- People: ànSúr
- Language: kìSúr

Sur–Myet, also known as kuSur (Nsur), Tapshin, or Myet, is a minor Plateau language of Bauchi and Plateau states, Nigeria. There are two closely related dialects, Súr and Myet.

There are about 16,000 speakers of Sur–Myet. Sur speakers are surrounded by Ngas speakers, who refer to the Sur as Dishili. Nevertheless, Sur is a vital language still being passed onto children, and is not immediately endangered.

== Geographical distribution ==
Sur is spoken in the following villages.

- Kancak
- Targal
- Kantem
- Shishir
- Gyasham Sakiya
- Kalep
- Mashekarah
- Bussa
- Kocten Angwan Gyad
- Shikanyan
- Bakin Kogi Pwai
- Bada Koshi
- Nasarawa Pwai
- B. Kogi Tapshin (Tapshin village is also known as Ngotuk)

Myet is spoken in the following villages.

- Myet
- Gat Myet
- Dasham
- Dasham Yelwa
- Pukdi
- Yimi
- Nkandim
