= Caleb Angas =

Caleb Angas (c. 1782 – 6 February 1860) was an agriculturist in England.

Angas was born at South Brandon in County Durham in 1781 or 1782. His parents were Silas Angas (1746/47–1823) and Sarah Jopling (d. 1791). He lived at Brancepeth in County Durham until he was 32, when he moved to John Grimston's Neswick farm in the East Riding of Yorkshire. He was considered in the Riding to be an authority on farming. He was a clever writer and a good mathematician, and knowledgeable about mechanics. His letters to the Sun newspaper attracted much attention, and were of great service to the cause of free trade. Richard Cobden frequently referred to them in his campaign with the Anti–Corn Law League against trade protectionism. Angas died at Driffield on 6 February 1860.
