= Duhwa language =

Chadic language spoken in Nigeria

Duhwa
- Karfa
- Native to: Nigeria
- Region: Nasarawa State
- Native speakers: 3,000 (2021)
- Language family: Afro-Asiatic: Chadic; West Chadic; Bole–Angas; Ron (A.4); Duhwa

Language codes
- ISO 639-3: kbz
- Glottolog: duhw1236

Duhwa, or Karfa (also Kerifa, Nzuhwi) is an Afro-Asiatic language spoken in Nasarawa State, Nigeria.
