= Ron language =

Chadic language cluster spoken in Nigeria

Ron
- Ron
- Native to: Nigeria
- Region: Plateau State
- Native speakers: 230,000 (2020)
- Language family: Afro-Asiatic: Chadic; West; Bole–Angas; Ron (A.4); Ron
- Dialects: Bokkos; Mbar; Daffo-Butura; Shagawu; Maleni; Manguna; Nafunfia
- Writing system: Latin

Language codes
- ISO 639-3: cla
- Glottolog: ronn1241 Ron mang1417 Mangar

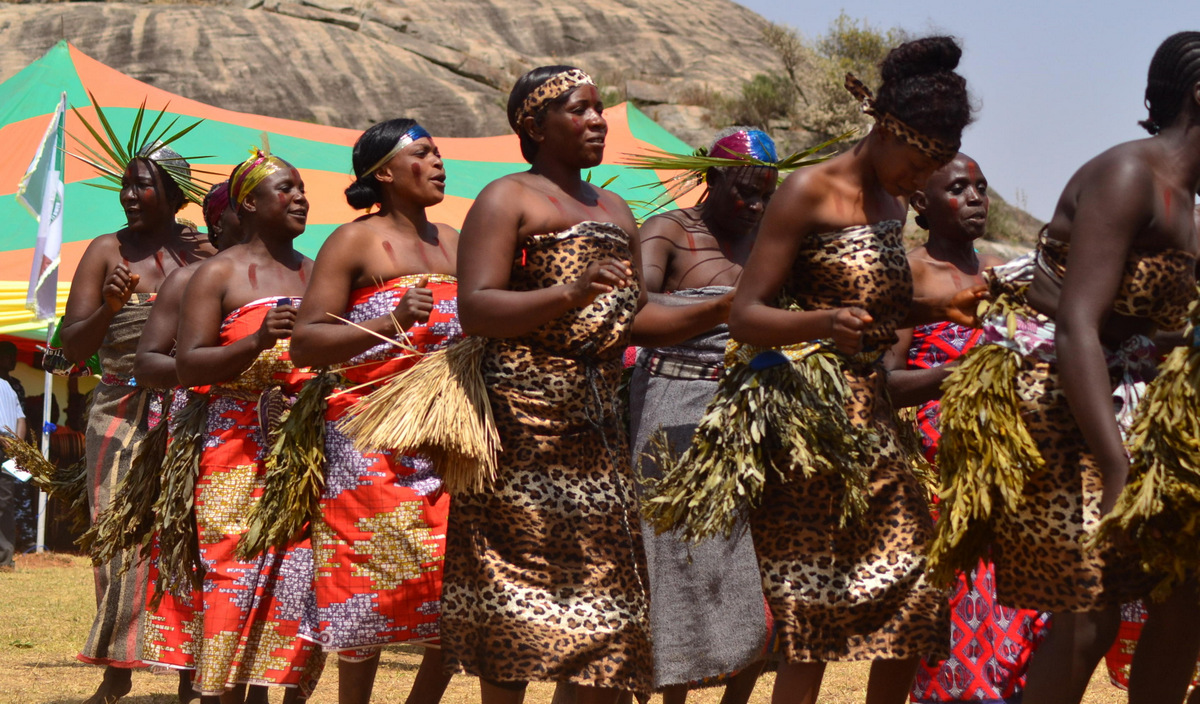
Butura dancers during the Nawhai Festival in Bokkos.

Ron (Run; also known as Challa, Chala) is an Afro-Asiatic language cluster spoken in Plateau State, Nigeria. Dialects include Bokkos, Daffo-Mbar-Butura (incl. Mangar), Monguna/Manguna (Shagau), (20,000 speakers).

== Varieties ==
Blench (2019) lists these language varieties in the Ron (Run) cluster:

- Bokkos
- Mbar
- Daffo–Butura
- Manguna(Shagau)
- Mangar
- Sha
- Butura

Daffo-Mbar-Butura is spoken in Hottom, Maiduna, Hurum, Fanga, Kandik, Faram, Mandung, Mayi, and Josho villages.

Manguna (Shagau) is spoken in Manguna, Mahurum, Hurti, Gwande, Dambwash and Karfa

== Curiosity ==
Although modern Ron uses a decimal system, it is well attested that in the past a duodecimal counting system was used.
