= William Angas =

British sailor and missionary (1781–1832)

William Henry Angas (6 October 1781 – 9 September 1832) was an English sailor missionary. He was born at Newcastle upon Tyne and was a brother of George Fife Angas. He went to sea and was captured by a French privateer, and imprisoned for a year and a half.

Afterward he commanded ships owned by his father, Caleb Angas (1743–1831), then became a Baptist minister in 1817 after a year's study at Edinburgh. In 1822, he was appointed missionary to seafaring men by the British and Foreign Seamen's Friend Society and Bethel Union. He travelled to various ports and foreign countries for religious purposes, and was serving a chapel at South Shields when he died of cholera on 9 September 1832, aged 50.

== Source ==
- Memoirs of the Rev. William Henry Angas : ordained a "Missionary to seafaring men", 11 May 1822.
