= Angam (2011 film) =

Angam: The Art of War
- Directed by: Rasanga Weerasinghe
- Produced by: Rasanga Weerasinghe; Eranga Hemajith; Lalindra Amarasekara
- Starring: Dr.Siran Deraniyagala; Dr.Riyency Wickramasinghe; G.Karunapala; Athula Nandana Perera; Oliver Hermann; Piumal Edirisinghe
- Cinematography: Anuradha Jayasuriya
- Edited by: Amila Akalpa Perera
- Music by: Lalindra Amarasekara
- Release date: September 7, 2011
- Running time: 71 minutes
- Country: Sri Lanka
- Languages: Sinhala; English; German
- Budget: 100 $ (Rs. 12000 approx)

Angam is a documentary film made in 2010 about Sri Lankan history and the survival of its traditional martial art, angampora. It was produced and directed by Rasanga Weerasinghe. The film explores the origins of Sri Lankan civilization, and the vital role Angampora has played in its history, up to the present day. The film was released in 2011 at Goethe Institute, Colombo, as a private screening organized by the filmmakers.

== Cast ==
- Dr. Siran Upendra Deraniyagala
- Dr. Riyency Wickramasinghe
- G. Karunapala
- Athula Nandana Perera
- Oliver Hermann
- Piumal Edirisinghe

== Plot ==
Angam: The Art of War, film talks about the origin, evolution & technical details of the martial art Angampora. The film also discusses its current situation and how they managed to attract local and foreign interest to this dying art. The story is told through historical facts & folk stories along with detailed angampora demonstrations. Angam: The Art of War, features veteran Angampora masters such as Dr. Wikramasinghe, G. Karunapala and Athula Nandasena along with the world-renowned archaeologist Dr. Siran Upendra Deraniyagala.

== Screenings & Distribution ==
The film was premiered at Goethe-Institut Film Forum in 2011 followed by couple of other very successful screenings in Sri Lanka & Germany. In 2012 the film got acquired by Grindout Pictures to be distributed worldwide.
