= Mundat language =

Afro-Asiatic language of Nigeria

Mundat
- Native to: Nigeria
- Region: Plateau State
- Native speakers: 1,500 (2021)
- Language family: Afro-Asiatic: Chadic; West Chadic; Bole–Angas; Ron (A.4); Mundat

Language codes
- ISO 639-3: mmf
- Glottolog: mund1334

Mundat is an Afro-Asiatic language spoken in Plateau State, Nigeria in Mundat village of Bokkos LGA.
