= Pyem language =

Plateau language spoken in Nigeria

Pyem
- Pyam, Fyam, Fyem
- Native to: Nigeria
- Region: Plateau State
- Ethnicity: Pyem people
- Native speakers: (31,000 cited 1996 census)
- Language family: Niger–Congo?: Atlantic–Congo; Benue–Congo; Plateau; East; Pyem

Language codes
- ISO 639-3: pym
- Glottolog: fyam1238
- ELP: Fyem
- Pyem is classified as Severely Endangered by the UNESCO Atlas of the World's Languages in Danger

Pyem (Pyam, Gye; Hausa: Fyam, Fyem) is a Plateau language of Nigeria. It is spoken by the people of Pyem Chiefdom with headquarters in Gindiri. Pyem is one of the indigenous languages spoken in Mangu LGA, Plateau State, Nigeria.

== Revitalization efforts ==
Most Pyem youths no longer speak the language.

In 2018, the Ba-Pyam Azonci Association with support from some U.S. partners, commissioned the publication of books in Pyem to save it from going extinct. Examples of such books are Shalai na Waari na DePyam, "Reading and Writing in Pyem"; Beer, Kwor, Na Cikam Arye, "Relationship, Counting, Proverbs, Names, and Directions"; etc.
