= Horom language =

Plateau language of Nigeria

Horom
- Horom
- Native to: Nigeria
- Region: Plateau State
- Native speakers: (1,500 cited 1998)
- Language family: Niger–Congo?: Atlantic–Congo; Benue–Congo; Plateau; East; Horom

Language codes
- ISO 639-3: hoe
- Glottolog: horo1245
- ELP: Horom

Rom
- Person: Rom
- People: BaRom
- Language: Horom

Horom (Rom) is a Plateau language of Nigeria.

Neighbouring ethnic groups consider the Rom to be culturally part of the Ron, who are West Chadic speakers. The Rom people are also known for their xylophones.

== Sources ==
- Blench, Roger. 2012. Horom wordlist.
