= Gindiri =

Town in Plateau State, Nigeria

- Town
- Location within Nigeria
- Coordinates: 09°35′40″N 09°14′45″E
- Country: Nigeria
- State: Plateau State
- LGA: Mangu
- Elevation: 1,159 m (3,802 ft)
- Time zone: UTC+01:00 (WAT)
- Postal code: 932
- Climate: Aw

Gindiri is a town in Mangu Local Government Area, Plateau State, North Central, Nigeria. The postal code of the area is 932. The town sits on an elevation of 1,159 m (3,802 ft) above sea level. The town is the headquarters of the Pyem Chiefdom.

== Education ==
Gindiri is home to institutions like:

- Girls' High School, Gindiri (established 1958)
- Boys' Secondary School, Gindiri (established 1950)
- Government Secondary School (GSS), Bwalbwang, Gindiri.
- Plateau State College of Education, Gindiri
- Gindiri Theological Seminary
- Teachers' Training College, Gindiri (established 1935)

== Traditional stool ==
Gindiri is the seat of the Pyem Chiefdom. The Sum Pyem as of 2021 was Sum Charles Mato Dakat, a second class chief.

== Notable people ==
- Eliezer Paul-Gindiri, Nigerian-American amateur golfer
- Ilijah Paul (b. 2002), American soccer player
