= Yangkam language =

Endangered Plateau language of Nigeria

Yangkam
- Bashar
- Yàŋkàm
- Native to: Nigeria
- Region: Plateau State
- Native speakers: (100 cited 1996)
- Language family: Niger–Congo?: Atlantic–Congo; Benue–Congo; Plateau; Tarokoid; Yangkam

Language codes
- ISO 639-3: bsx
- Glottolog: yang1290
- ELP: Yangkam

Yàŋkàm
- Person: Yàŋkàm
- People: aYaŋkam
- Language: Yàŋkàm

Yangkam (Yankam), or Bashar (Basherawa), is a moribund Plateau language of Nigeria. It is located to the west of Bashar town in Plateau State.

Yangkam-speaking villages are Tukur, Bayar, Pyaksam, and Kiram. All speakers are elderly, with a total of approximately 400 fluent speakers remaining.
