= Eliezer Paul-Gindiri =

Nigerian-American golfer

Personal information
- Full name: Eliezer Paul-Gindiri
- Nickname: Snappy Gilmore
- Nationality: United States
- Born: Nigeria

Career
- Sport: Golf
- College: Contra Costa College

Eliezer Paul-Gindiri, nicknamed Snappy Gilmore, is a Nigerian-American amateur golfer who is known for his distinctive single-handed golf swing. First gaining popularity after a 2021 viral video, he was invited in 2022 by PGA of America and PGA Tour to share his technique with PGA players.

== Biography ==
Prior to entering golf, Paul-Gindiri played soccer at Contra Costa College. On February 28, 2021, a video garnered five million views on TikTok, featuring him playing golf with at Diablo Creek Golf Course in Concord, California. His driving technique with a golf club which garnered him and his synonymous technique the nickname Snappy Gilmore, an homage to the film Happy Gilmore, caused him to be featured on Barstool Sports, Golf Magazine, Sports Illustrated, and SportsCenter. Genesis Motor sponsored a friendly match between PGA Tour professional Max Homa and Paul-Gindiri on March 15, 2022. The video compared Paul-Gindiri's drive against Homa's more-traditional two handed swing. In jest, they both declared the result of the games as a tie.

He participated in the fourth Creator Classic at East Lake Golf Club, an event organized for golf influencers by the PGA Tour.
