= Mangu, Nigeria =

Mangu
- LGA and town
- Interactive map of Mangu
- Location in Nigeria
- Coordinates: 9°26′N 9°08′E
- Country: Nigeria
- State: Plateau State

Government
  - Type: Local government
  - Chairman: Markus Artu
  - Mishkaham Mwagavwul (Head of Mangu Traditional Council of Chiefs): Da John Putmang Hirse

Area
  - Total: 1,653 km^{2} (638 sq mi)

Population (2006 census)
  - Total: 294,931
  - Density: 178.4/km^{2} (462.1/sq mi)
- Time zone: UTC+1 (WAT)
- 3-digit postal code prefix: 932
- ISO 3166 code: NG.PL.MA

Mangu is a Local Government Area in Plateau State, Nigeria. Governor Caleb Mutfwang appointed Markus Artu as the Transition Committee Chairman of the LGA.

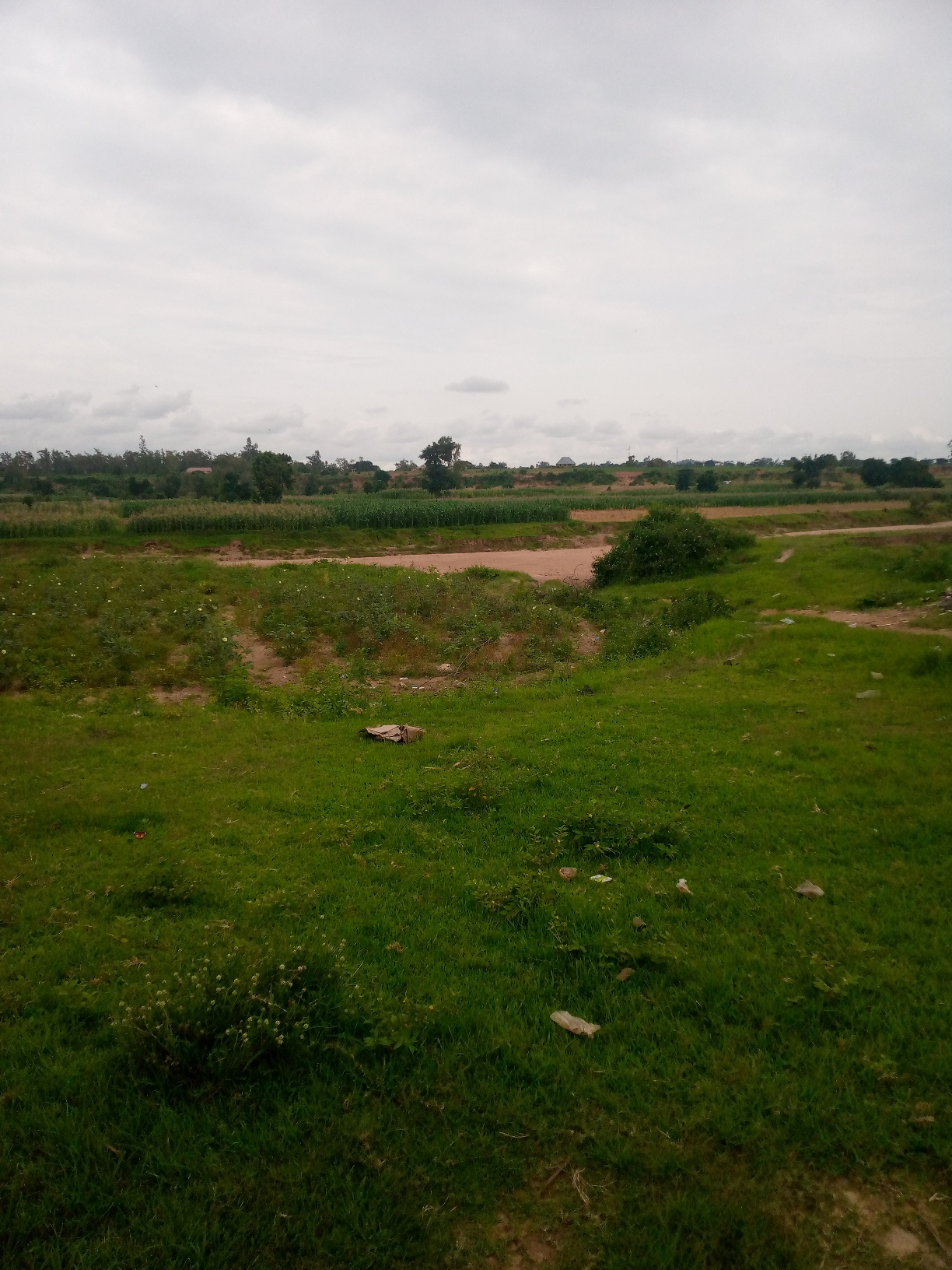
Mangu local government Plateau state Nigeria

It has an area of 1,653 km^{2} and a population of 294,931 at the 2006 census.

The postal code of the area is 932.

== Religion ==
Mangu inhabitants are mostly Christians with few Traditional Religionists, and few Muslims respectively. The predominantly populated church is the Cocin. Other churches include the Roman Catholic Church, Baptist, Evangelical Church Winning All, Anglican church, Deeper Life Bible Church, Foursquare Gospel Church, Assemblies of God, The Redeemed Christian church of God, Living faith, Christ Apostolic Church, Christ Embassy etc.

== Demographics ==
The major ethnic group found in Mangu is the Mwaghavul. They occupy the districts of Panyam, Pushit, Kerang, Mangun, Kombun, Ampang West, and the local government headquarters at Mangu town. Other ethnic groups include the Jipal (found in Kaper, Katul, Kabum, Rundum, Kanjing, Bul, Male, Zwagal, Kwa, Kaburuk, Koplar and Dungning). Pyem (found in Gindiri). The Chakfem People and the Kwanka or Kadung people inhabiting the northeastern in Kadunung.

The main languages spoken in Mangu Local Government Area are Mwaghavul and Pyem.

== Economy ==
Mangu local government also host the factory of Nigeria's first and most cherished bottle water; SWAN Spring Water, located at the foot of the Kerang Volcanic Mountains.

== Climate ==
Mangu has two distinct seasons: the dry season is hot and partially cloudy, and the wet season is warm, muggy, and overcast. Rarely does the temperature fall below 10 °C (50 °F) or rise over 36 °C (96 °F) throughout the year; it normally ranges from 13 °C (55 °F) to 33 °C (91 °F). With an average daily high temperature of 31 °C (88 °F), the hot season lasts for 2.6 months, from February 4 to April 23. At an average high temperature of 33 °C (91 °F) and low temperature of 18 °C (65 °F), March is the hottest month of the year in Mangu. With an average daily maximum temperature below 26 °C (79 °F), the chilly season spans 3.2 months, from July 2 to October 9. With an average low of 17 °C (63 °F) and high of 24 °C (76 °F), August is the coldest month of the year in Mangu.

=== Cloud ===
Over the course of the year, Mangu's average percentage of cloud cover varies significantly based on the season. In Mangu, the clearer season lasts about 3.8 months, starting around November 4 and ending around February 28. January is the clearest month of the year in Mangu, with the sky being clear, mostly clear, or partly overcast 54% of the time on average. The cloudier portion of the year lasts for 8.2 months, ending around November 4, starting around February 28. May is the cloudiest month of the year in Mangu, with the sky being overcast or mostly cloudy 83% of the time on average.

=== Precipitation ===
When there is at least 1.0 millimetre (0.04 in) of liquid or liquid-equivalent precipitation, the day is considered wet. In Mangu, the likelihood of rainy days changes dramatically from season to season. Over 38% of days are likely to be rainy during the 5.8-month-long rainy season, which runs from April 18 to October 13. With an average of 22.9 days with at least 1.0 millimetre (0.04 in) of precipitation, August has the most rainy days in Mangu. October 13 to April 18 is the start of the 6.2-month dry season. January has the fewest rainy days in Mangu, with an average of 0.0 days with at least 1.0 millimetre (0.04 in) of precipitation. We categorize rainy days as either rain only, snow only, or a combination of both. August, with an average of 22.9 days, is the month with the most days of rain alone in Mangu. According to this classification, rain alone has the highest possibility of occurring on August 21st, occurring 75% of the time throughout the year.

=== Rainfall ===
The year's rainy season, which spans 7.4 months from March 21 to November 3, is characterized by sliding 31-day rainfall of at least 13 millimetres (0.5 in). August is the wettest month in Mangu, with an average rainfall of 190 millimetres (7.4 in). From November 3 to March 21, or 4.6 months, there is no rain during this time of year. With an average rainfall of 0.0 inches, December is the month with the least amount of rain in Mangu.

=== Geography ===
Mangu LGA has an average temperature of 29 degrees Celsius or 84.2 degrees Fahrenheit and a total area of 1,653 square kilometres or 638 square miles. The dry and wet seasons are the two distinct seasons that the LGA experiences. The average humidity in the LGA is 49%, and the average wind speed in the region is 11 km/h or 6.8 mph.
