= Angas people =

Ethnic group in Nigeria

Ngas
Total population
- 1,000,000

Languages
- Ngas

Religion
- Catholicism (52%), Anglicanism (24%), Cocin (22%)

The Ngas people (also known as the Agas and Angas) are an ethnic group in Plateau State, Nigeria. They speak an Afro-Asiatic language called Ngas. Recent studies have indicated there are roughly 1,000,000 Ngas people in Nigeria today.

== History ==
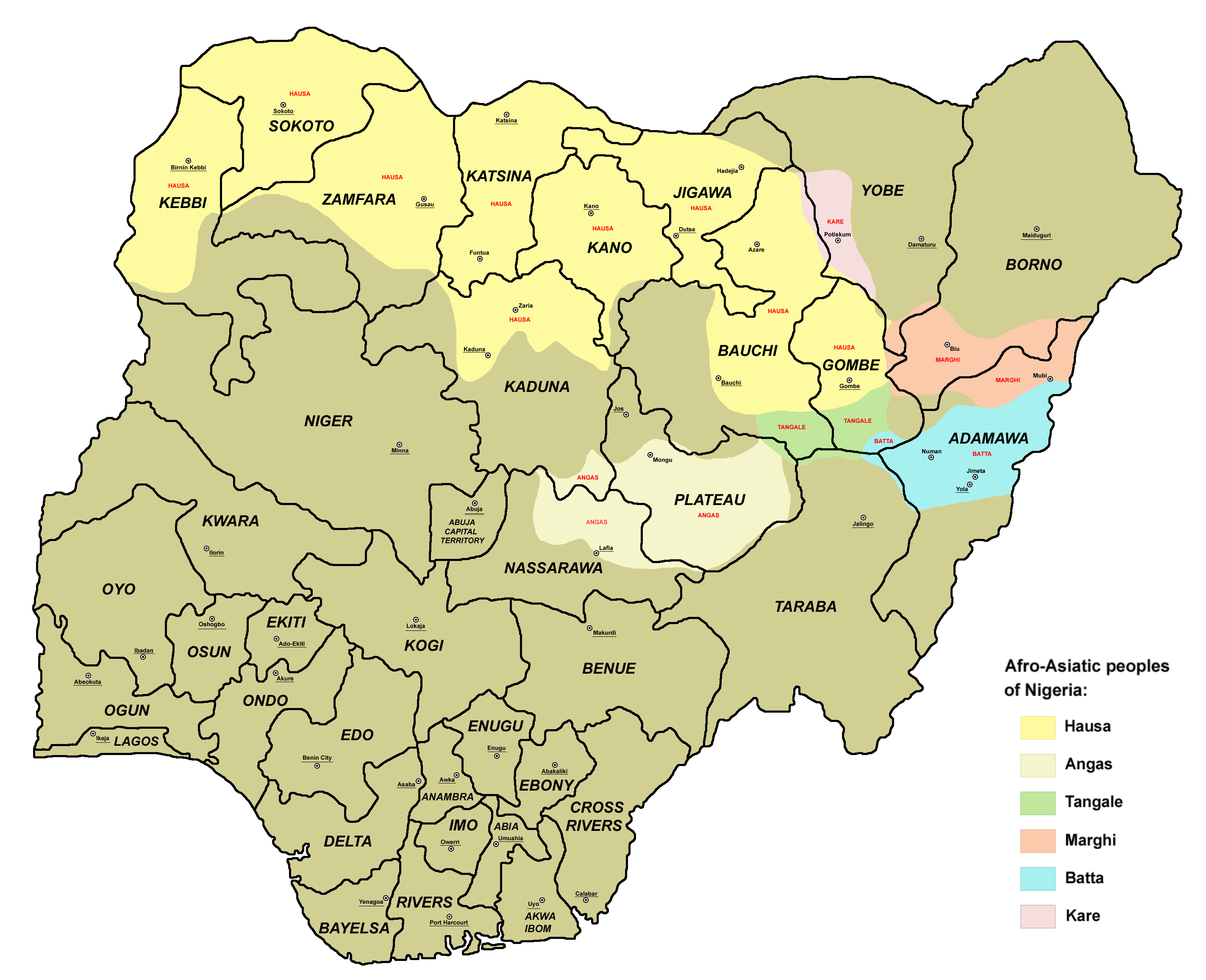
Map of Nigeria showing the range of Afro-Asiatic language speakers. The tan region in central Nigeria represents the Ngas people.

According to local folklore, the Ngas migrated from Bornu passing through villages before settling on the highlands of Plateau State. In the course of migration, the groups splintered into sub-groups settling in Pankshin, Ampang, Amper and Kabwir districts. The settlers at Kabwir were led by a chief called Gwallam and the chief of the Ampers was Kendim. Later settlements populated the highlands of the Jos Plateau.

=== Festival ===
The Ngas celebrate a major festival called the Tsafi Tar or Mos Tar, during the celebration, a brief event called Shooting the Moon takes places to mark the end season and the beginning of a new season. The festival is usually celebrated during the time of harvest.

=== Settlement ===
The Ngas who predominantly live on the lowlands and the Southeastern edge of the Jos Plateau are the largest group in the Jos highlands. The major city is Pankshin. The Gyangyan or Ampang district is dominated by hills and ridges, to the west of the ridges form the plains that constitute the lands of the Amper district. The soil of the plains of Amper are littered with granite and farmers in the district grow crops on terraced fields to plant cereal crops such as millet, guinea corn and maize. The people used the granite boulders as foundations and walls for their houses.

== Culture and religion ==
Many Ngas people follow a syncretic form of Christianity. One example of this syncretism is a retained belief in a traditional resurrection-like process called tuput, which translate as "to die and come out". In tuput, when a person who followed certain ritual practices while alive dies, their soul leaves their body, but may return to the body within two days and carry on living as if they had never died.

== Language ==
Ngas belongs to the Chadic Branch of AfroAsiatic family of languages, even though there are minor differences in accent and speech pattern. Ngas people fromdifferent villages enjoy mutual intelligibility.

== Sources ==
- LaPin, Deirdre (1984). "Sons of the Moon" (PDF). Institute for the Study of Human Issues.
