= Ngas language =

West Chadic language of Nigeria

Ngas
- Angas
- Native to: Nigeria
- Region: Plateau State
- Ethnicity: Angas people
- Native speakers: (400,000 cited 1998)
- Language family: Afro-Asiatic: Chadic; West Chadic; Bole–Angas; Angas (A.3); Ngas
- Dialects: Hill; Plain
- Writing system: Latin

Language codes
- ISO 639-3: anc
- Glottolog: ngas1240
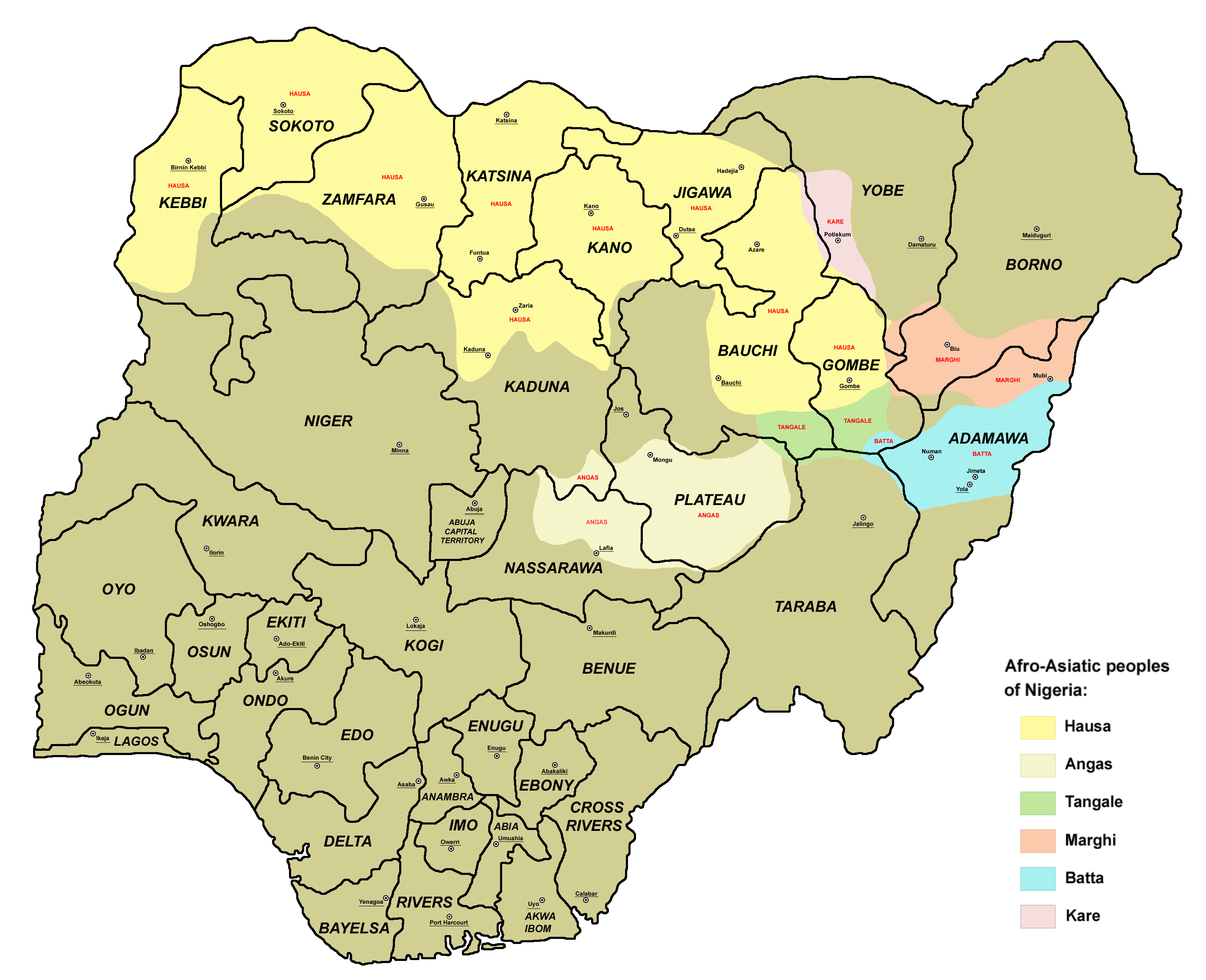
- Ethnic territories (tan) of the Ngas-speaking people (Angas) in Nigeria

Ngas, or Angas, is an Afro-Asiatic language spoken in Plateau State, Nigeria. The language has two dialects: Hill Angas and Plain Angas. Ngas is one of the major languages in Plateau State. The 1952 census puts it as the largest ethnic group in Plateau State. Retired General Yakubu Gowon is a prominent Nigerian who is of Ngas ethnicity.

== Neighbouring languages ==
Belnǝng is an A3 West Chadic language closely related to Angas. It is spoken by about 500 people in the single village of Langung, which is surrounded by Tal villages in the east and Miship villages in the west.

Speakers of Sur, a Plateau language, are surrounded by Ngas speakers, but Sur nevertheless continues to be a well-maintained language.

The Ngas language has also undergone extensive influence from Tarok.

== Phonology ==
=== Vowels ===
	Front	Central	Back
Close	i iː		u uː
Close-mid	eː	ə əː	oː
Open-mid	ɛ	ə əː	ɔ
Open		a aː	

- Sounds /ɛ, ɔ/ are only heard as short equivalents of /eː, oː/, which are only heard as long.

=== Consonants ===
		Labial			Alveolar		Palato- alveolar		Palatal		Velar			Glottal
		plain	lab.	pal.	plain	lab.	plain	lab.	plain	lab.	plain	lab.	pal.	Glottal
Nasal		m	mʷ	mʲ	n	nʷ			ɲ	ɲʷ	ŋ			
Stop/ Affricate	voiceless	p	pʷ	pʲ	t		t͡ʃ	t͡ʃʷ			k	kʷ		ʔ
Stop/ Affricate	voiced	b	bʷ	bʲ	d		d͡ʒ	d͡ʒʷ			ɡ	ɡʷ		
Stop/ Affricate	vd. prenasal	ᵐb			ⁿd		ⁿd͡ʒ				ᵑɡ			
Stop/ Affricate	vl. prenasal	ᵐp					ⁿt͡ʃ				ᵑk			
Stop/ Affricate	implosive	ɓ	ɓʷ		ɗ						ɠ	ɠʲʷ	ɠʲ	
Fricative	voiceless	f	fʷ	fʲ	s		ʃ	ʃʷ						h
Fricative	voiced	v	vʷ		z		ʒ	ʒʷ			ɣ			
Fricative	vl. prenasal						ⁿʃ							
Fricative	vd. prenasal						ⁿʒ	ⁿʒʷ						
Approximant		w			l	lʷ			j					
Trill	voiced				r	rʷ								
Trill	prenasal				ⁿr									

== Writing system ==
Ngas alphabet
a	b	ɓ	c	d	ɗ	dy	e	ǝ	f	g	h	ḥ	i	j	k	l
m	n	ṇ	ny	o	p	r	s	sh	t	u	v	w	y	z	ẓ	ʼ
