= Bokkos =

- LGA and town
- Interactive map of Bokkos
- Location in Nigeria
- Coordinates: 9°15′N 8°53′E
- Country: Nigeria
- State: Plateau State

Government
  - Local Government Chairman: Monday Kassa
  - Saf Kulere (Head of Bokkos Traditional Council of chiefs): Lawrence Aizat

Area
  - Total: 1,682 km^{2} (649 sq mi)

Population (2006 census)
  - Total: 178,454
  - Density: 106.1/km^{2} (274.8/sq mi)
- Time zone: UTC+1 (WAT)
- 3-digit postal code prefix: 932
- ISO 3166 code: NG.PL.BO

Bokkos is a town and Local Government Area in Plateau State, Nigeria.

== History ==
Plateau State University, located in Bokkos, was temporary closed in 2007, but reopened in 2012.

=== Recent Violence and Conflict ===
Plateau State has experienced recurrent violence rooted in complex issues, including competition over land, ethnicity, religion, and political power. Both Christian and Muslim communities have suffered from these conflicts, with tragic losses on all sides.

In December 2023, between 140 and 300 Christians were killed in a four-day massacre during the Christmas season in Plateau State. Additionally, on Easter Monday, 1 April 2024, ten Christians were killed in attacks on three communities of the Parish of Saint Thomas the Apostle, reportedly carried out by suspected Fulani militants.

== Government ==
It has an area of 1,682 km^{2} and a population of 178,454 at the 2006 census. Ron languages are the indigenous languages spoken in Bokkos.

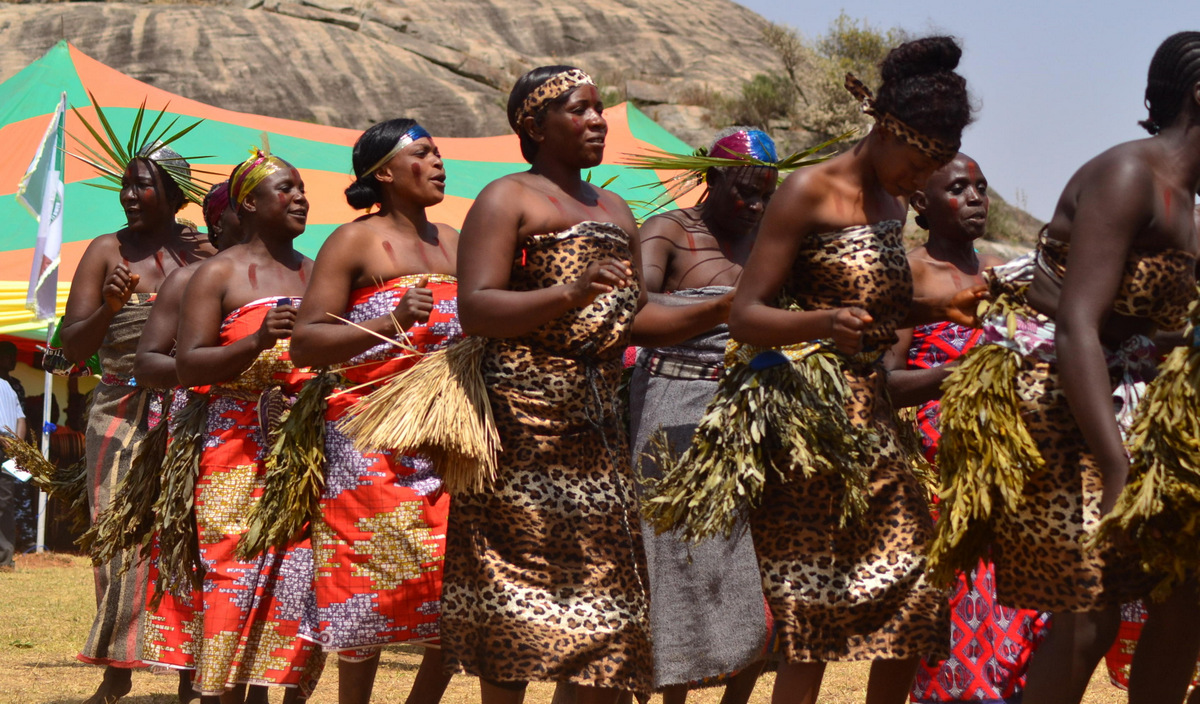
Butura dancers during the Nawhai Festival in Bokkos.

The postal code of the area is 932.

Bokkos Local Government has eight districts which are Bokkos, Mushere, Daffo, Sha, Manguna, Richa, Toff, and Kamwai. There are 20 electoral wards in Bokkos.

The institution has received accreditation from the National Universities Commission (NUC) .Bokkos L

The Paramount ruler of Bokkos is called saf Ron/Kulere. He is the Chairman of the Bokkos traditional council.

== Climate/Geography ==
Bokkos is always warm, partially cloudy during the dry season, and muggy and overcast during the wet one. The average annual temperature fluctuates between 54 °F and 89 °F; it is rarely lower or higher than 49 °F or 93 °F. The 2.7-month hot season, which runs from January 28 to April 18, has daily highs that average more than 85 °F. With an average high temperature of 89 °F and low temperature of 63 °F, March is the hottest month of the year in Bokkos.

Summertime temperatures above 76 °F are rare during the 3.5-month-long cold season, which runs from June 27 to October 10. August, with an average low temperature of 61 °F and high temperature of 72 °F, is the coldest month of the year in Bokkos.

Bokkos LGA has an average annual temperature of 25 degrees Celsius (77 degrees Fahrenheit) and is spread across 1,682 square kilometres or 649 square miles. Bokkos LGA has an average humidity of 55% and an average wind speed of 14 km/h.

=== Cloud ===
Throughout the year, there is a noticeable seasonal change in the average percentage of cloud cover in Bokkos. In Bokkos, the clearest portion of the year lasts 3.8 months, starting about November 5 and ending around February 29. January is the clearest month of the year in Bokkos, with 53% of the sky being clear, mostly clear, or partly overcast on average. About November 5, the cloudier portion of the year ends. It starts about February 29 and lasts for 8.2 months. May is the cloudiest month of the year in Bokkos, with the sky being overcast or largely cloudy 85% of the time on average.

== Notable people ==
Notable people from Bokkos include:

- Joshua Dariye, former state governor
