= Christ's School, Ado Ekiti =

Christ's School
- Fajuyi Park, Ado-Ekiti; Ado-Ekiti, Ekiti State; Nigeria

Information
- School type: Secondary
- Motto: Christus Victor
- Established: 1933
- Colours: White and Blue

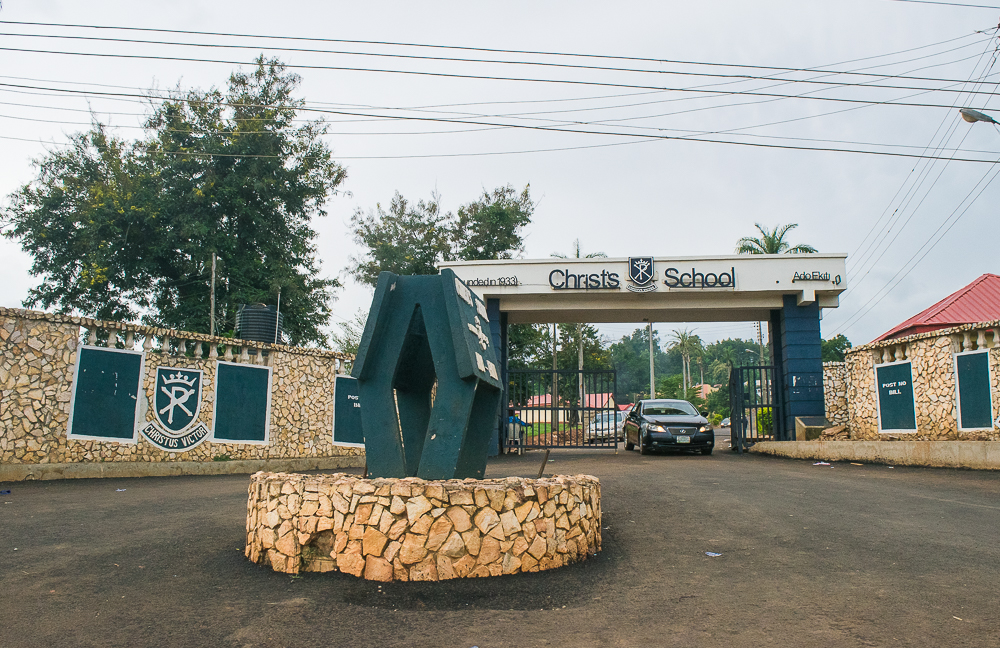
Christ School Ado-ekiti

Christ's School, Ado Ekiti is a day and boarding, government-owned secondary school located in Ado Ekiti, Ekiti State, Nigeria. Originally conceived as a boys school, it attained a co-educational status when, in 1966, it was merged with its girls arm, known then as Ekiti Anglican Girls Secondary School (EAGSS). However, it runs today as a boys school, independent of the girls arm, situated directly opposite to it.

== History ==
It was founded on 30 June 1933 by the British missionary, Archdeacon Henry Dallimore. Originally christened 'Ekiti Central School,' it began as a co-educational secondary school, taking students into classes V and VI. It took the name, 'Christ's School, Ado Ekiti,' following the recommendation of Sir Bernard Henry Bourdillon, the governor of then Northern and Southern Protectorates of Nigeria. In 1936, it relocated to its permanent and current site, the Agidimo Hills. It was conceived as an attempt to advance secondary school education in Ekitiland and Western Nigeria in an atmosphere where discipline, diligence and academic excellence would be nurtured and guaranteed.

'The total impact of the education to be given was to make the individual a useful person to himself and his community'. 'For this reason, initial subjects taught in The School included the following outside the normal academic subjects: Tailoring, Brick-making, Plastering, Building, Carpentry for boys and Weaving and Knitting for girls. Agriculture and Cattle keeping were added in 1945, thus by many decades before, Christ's School was already doing what today's 6-3-3-4 and all its other newer variants had been grappling with for decades.'

Much of the funding of its administration came from the Directorate of Education of the Christian Missionary Society (later Anglican Communion - Church of Nigeria) under the direct supervision of Henry Dallimore, the District Education Superintendent of CMS schools. In 1942, the school attained a full high school status, enlarging its capacity to admit students into classes other than classes V and VI. In consequence, Henry Dallimore became the High Master (equivalent of principal).

The school has alumni in fields including education, medicine, law, history, engineering, governance, banking, administration, diplomacy, and the arts.

The school's official symbol is the Chi Rho christogram with Christus Victor, the school motto represented below the plaque.

== Houses ==
- Mason: Blue
- Harding: Yellow
- Dallimore: Green
- Babamboni: Red
- Ogunlade: Purple

== Notable alumni ==
- Robert Adeyinka Adebayo
- Michael Bamidele Otiko
- Adegoke Olubummo
- J.F. Ade Ajayi
- Ladipo Adamolekun
- Niyi Osundare
- Michael Omolewa
- Olusegun Olutoyin Aganga
- Professor Benjamin Oluwakayode Osuntokun
- Kayode Fayemi
- Bolaji Akinyemi
- Erastus Akingbola
- Kayode Obembe
- Jacobs Moyo Ajekigbe
- Professor Akin Oyebode
- Christopher Kolade
- Ireti Doyle
- Henry Dele Alake
- Stephen Adebanji Akintoye
- Oludamola Osayomi
- Bolaji Aluko
- Tolu Olukayode Odugbemi
- Bimbo Daramola
- Prince Adedayo Clement Adeyeye
- Gbenga Aluko
- Hon. Justice Olajide Olatawura (JSC Rtd)
- Isaac Fola-Alade
- Samuel Asabia
- Sam Aluko
- Ekundayo Adeyinka Adeyemi
- Akin Osuntokun
- Eyitayo Jegede
- Israel Esan Owolabi
- Femi Elufowoju Jr.
- Adelola Adeloye
- Dapo Abiodun
- Oluwafemi Ajisafe
- Victor Adenuga Oyenuga
- Femi Oyebode

== Gallery ==
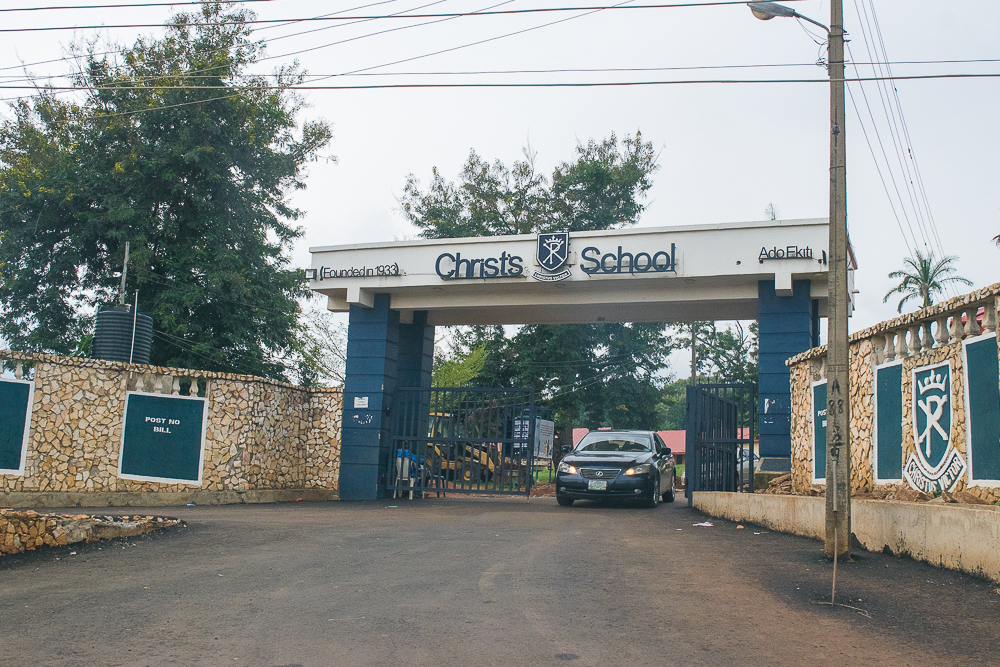

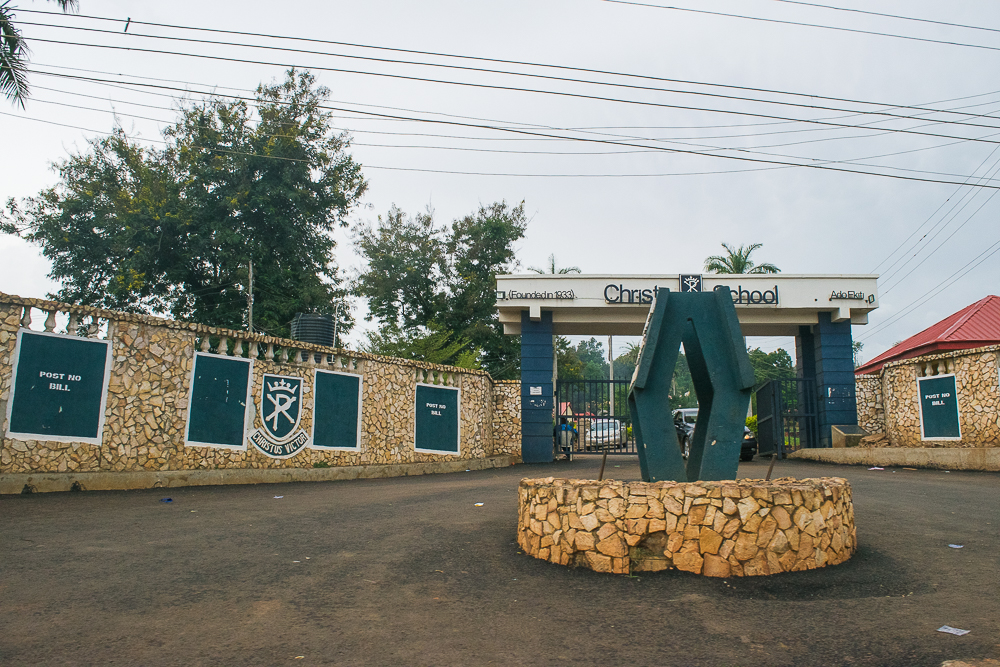

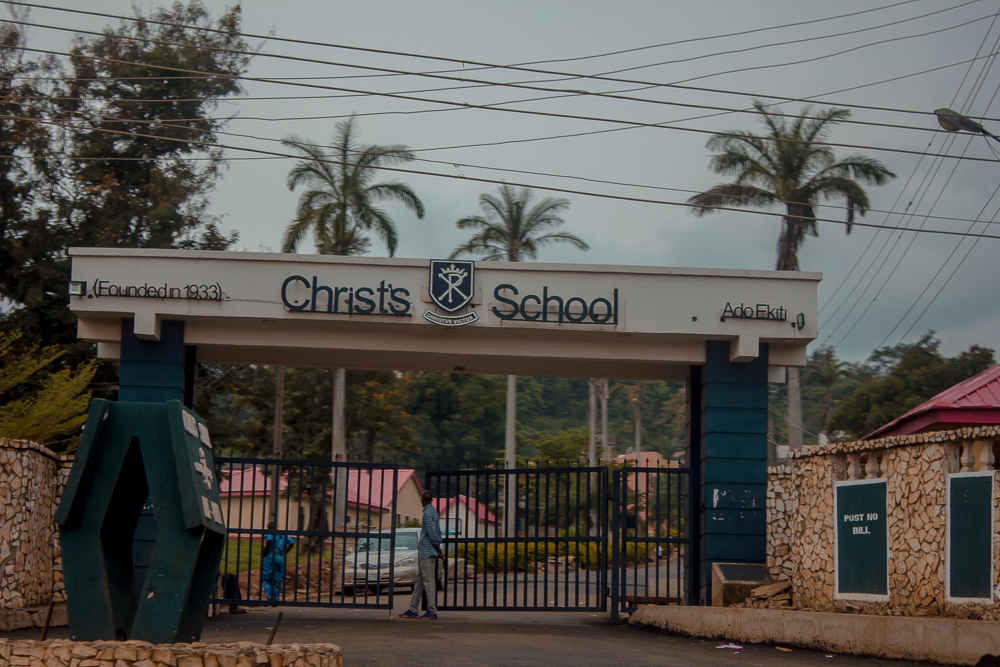
