= Ekiti State =

State of Nigeria

Ekiti
- State
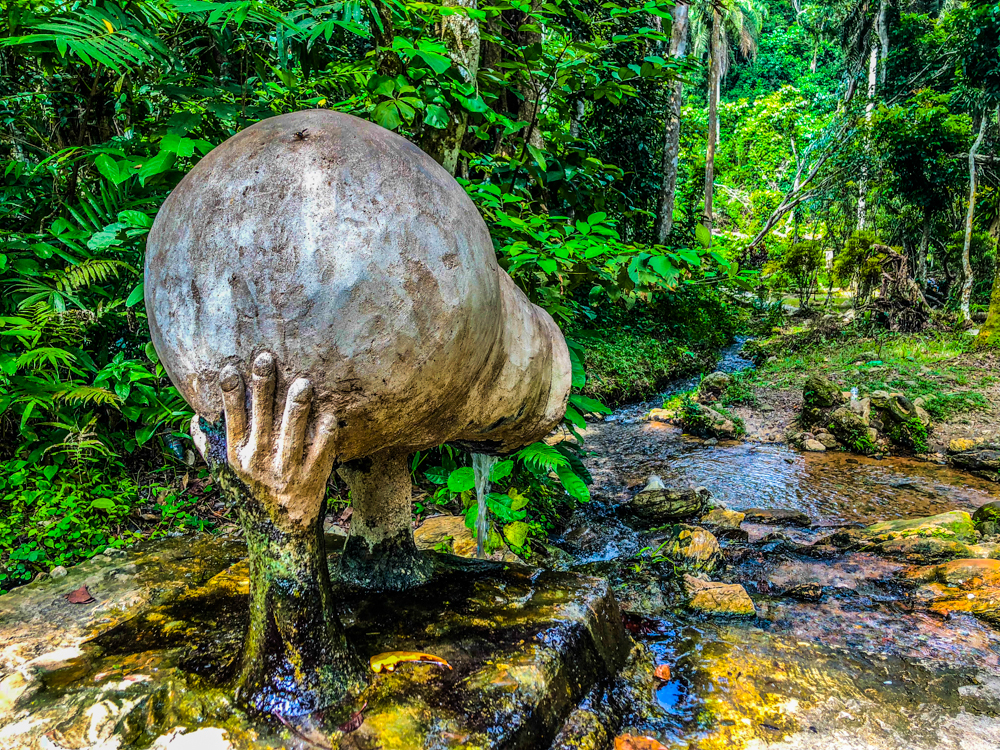
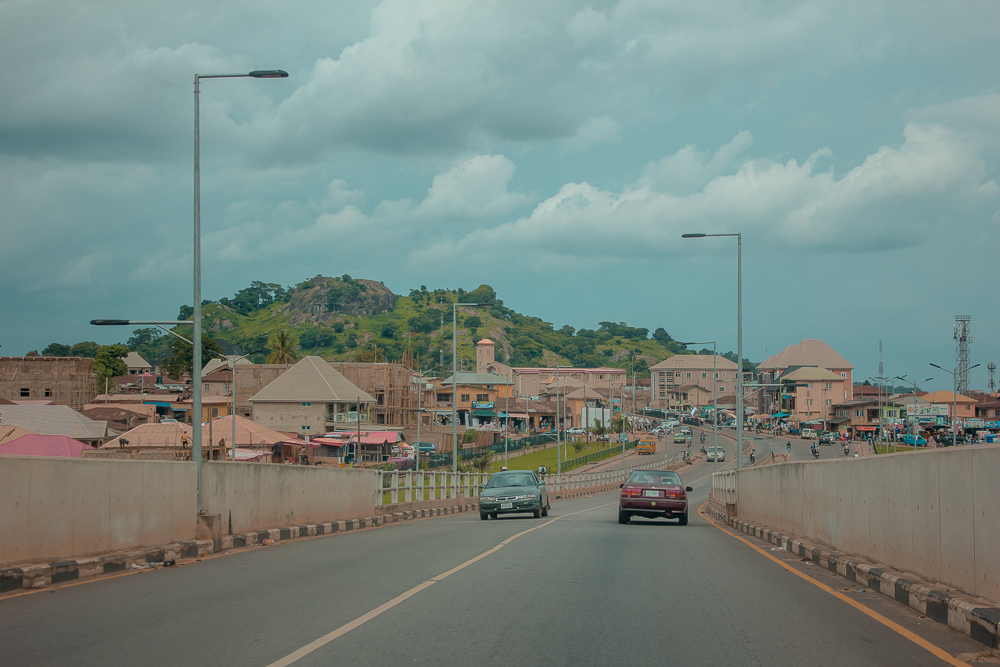
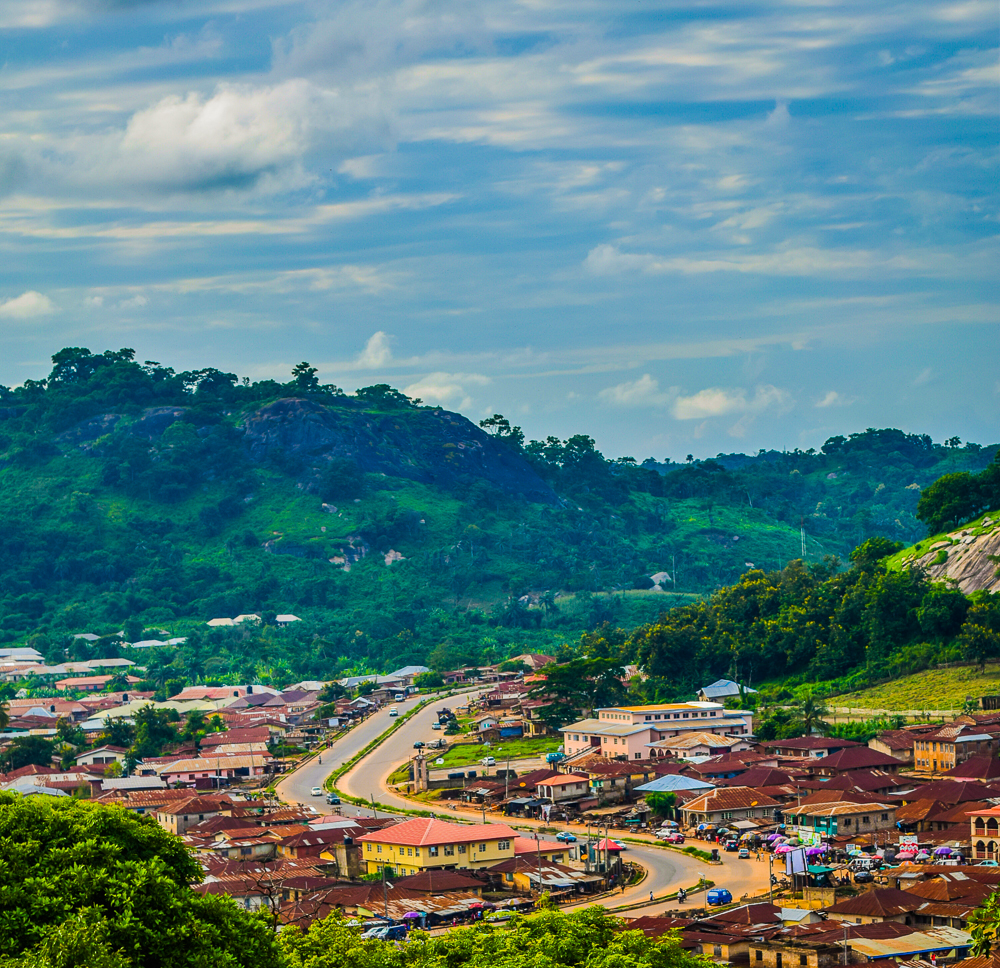
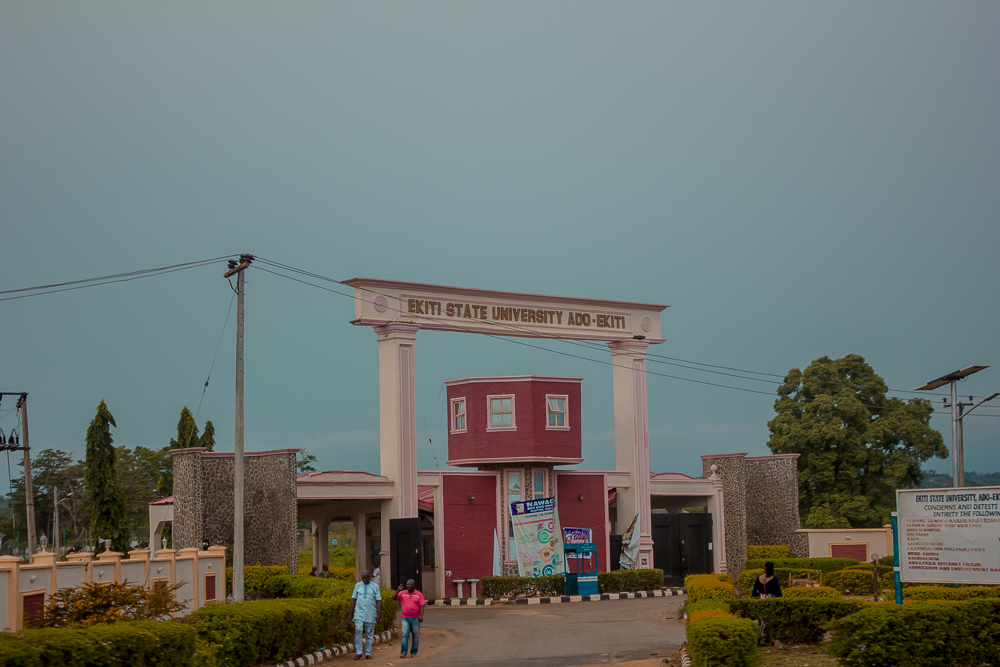
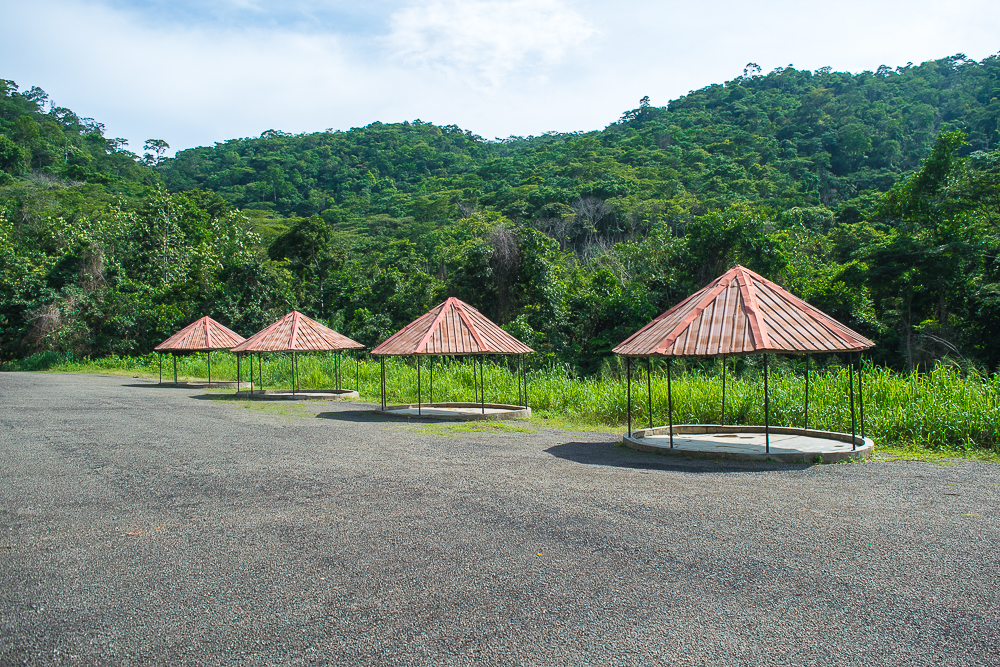
- From Top,left to right: Ikogosi Warm Springs, Ado Ekiti, Iworoko Mountain, Ekiti State University & Landscape in Ipole Iloro

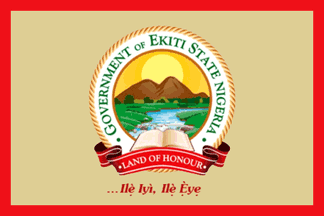
- Flag Seal
- Nicknames: Land of Honour & Integrity
- Location of Ekiti State in Nigeria
- Coordinates: 7°40′N 5°15′E
- Country: Nigeria
- LGAs: 16
- Date created: 1 October 1996
- Capital: Ado-Ekiti

Government
  - Body: Government of Ekiti State
  - Governor: Biodun Oyebanji (APC)
  - Deputy Governor: Monisade Afuye (APC)
  - Legislature: Ekiti State House of Assembly
  - Senators: C: Michael Opeyemi Bamidele (APC); N: Cyril Fasuyi (APC); S: Yemi Adaramodu (APC)
  - Representatives: List

Area
  - Total: 6,353 km^{2} (2,453 sq mi)
  - Rank: 31st of 36

Population (2006 Census)
  - Total: 2,210,957
  - Estimate (2022): 3,592,200
  - Rank: 29th of 36
  - Density: 348.0/km^{2} (901.4/sq mi)
- Demonym: Ekiti

GDP (PPP)
  - Year: 2021
  - Total: $15.20 billion 23rd of 36
  - Per capita: $3,979; 18th of 36
- Time zone: UTC+01 (WAT)
- ISO 3166 code: NG-EK
- HDI (2022): 0.612 medium · 11th of 37

Ekiti (Yoruba: Ìpínlẹ̀ Èkìtì) is a state in southwestern Nigeria, bordered to the North by Kwara State for 61 km, to the Northeast by Kogi State for 92 km, to the South and Southeast by Ondo State for 132 km, and to the West by Osun State for 84 km. Named for the Ekiti people—the Yoruba subgroup that makes up the majority of the state's population—Ekiti State was carved out from a part of Ondo State in 1996 and has its capital as the city of Ado-Ekiti.

One of the smallest and most educated states with the highest number of professors in Nigeria, Ekiti is the 31st largest in the area and 30th most populous with an estimated population of nearly 3.5 million as of 2022. Geographically, the state is divided between the Nigerian lowland forests in most of the state and the drier Guinean forest–savanna mosaic in the north. Among the state's nature are false acraeas, mona monkey, forest buffalo, and grey parrot populations along with one of the last remaining Nigeria-Cameroon chimpanzee populations with a troop of about 20 chimpanzees in the heavily threatened Ise Forest Reserve. In March 2022, Ekiti State became the first state in Nigeria to adopt a state tree as one of its official symbols. On World Forest Day 2022, Governor Kayode Fayemi announced that Obeche (Triplochiton scleroxylon) had been chosen as State Tree owing to its local prominence and environmental, economic and cultural significance.

Modern day Ekiti State has been primarily inhabited for centuries by the Ekiti people, a Yoruba subgroup, with minorities of the Akoko Yoruba subgroup,and Yagba–Ekiti Yoruba subgroup. Religiously, the majority of the state's population (~90%) are Christian with smaller Muslim and traditionalist minorities at about 5% and 5%, respectively.

In the pre-colonial period, the area that is now Ekiti State was at a time subjugated, like other ethnic groups in the present-day Yorubaland, by the Ibadan impirialist movement which culminated in the collapse of its (Ibadan) hegemony in 1890s, and finally, the Ekitiland which formed the Ekiti Confederacy in the latter half of the 1800s. From 1877 to 1893, the Ekiti Confederacy (Ekiti-Parapo) fought the Oyo-Ibadan during Ekiti-Parapo War (also known as Kiriji War) led by Fabunmi Okemesi-Ekiti alongside other Eastern Yoruba groups and other Western Yoruba groups; the war ended in a British-brokered stalemate before the area was colonized and incorporated into the British Southern Nigeria Protectorate which later merged into British Nigeria in 1914. After independence in 1960, the area of now Ekiti was a part of the post-independence Western Region until 1967 when the region was split and the area became part of the Western State. In 1976, the Western State was split and the state's east became Ondo State. Twenty years later, Ondo State's northwest (then termed the Ekiti Zone) was broken off to form Ekiti State.

Economically, Ekiti State is partially based on agriculture, mainly of yams, rice, cocoa, and cassava crops. Key minor industries are logging and tourism. Ekiti has the joint-thirteenth highest Human Development Index in the country and is considered the heart of the homeland of the Ekiti people.

Educationally, Ekiti State has the highest number of professors in Nigeria.

== History ==
Ekiti was an independent state prior to the British conquest. It was one of the many Yoruba states in what is today Nigeria. The Ekiti people as a nation and districts of the Yoruba race trace some of her progeny to Oduduwa, the father and progenitor of the Yoruba race even though good reason appears to establish the existence of aboriginal people in Ekiti region prior to the influx of royalty from present-day Ile Ife as that kingdom grew and abound.

There are two major schools of thought regarding Ekiti's history. First was the story that tied the origin of Ekiti to Ife. The story goes that the Olofin, one of the sons of Oduduwa had 16 children and in the means of searching for the new land to develop, they all journeyed out of Ile-Ife as they walked through the Iwo-Eleru (Cave of Ashes) at Ijare and had stopped over at a place called Igbo-Aka (forest of termites) closer to Ile-Oluji.

The Olofin, the 16 children and some other beloved people continued with their journey, but when they got to a particular lovely and flat land, the Owa-Obokun (the Monarch of Ijesha land) and Orangun of Ila decided to stay in the present Ijesha and Igbomina land in Osun state. While the remaining 14 children journeyed onwards and later settled in the present-day Ekiti land. They discovered that there were many hills in the place and they said in their mother's language that this is "Ile olokiti" the land of hills. Therefore, the Okiti was later blended to Ekiti. So Ekiti derived her name through hills.

This history may describe the history of certain royalty in present-day Ekiti, but not all of Ekiti which is made up of 131 Principal towns, with their own royalty and many land-owning communities with no royalty at all. In fact, the invading royalties from the East went on to colonize and transform the aboriginals, distinguishing the Ekiti dialect upon mix-up with the Ife/Oyo tongue of the Yorubas according to Samuel Johnson, the renowned historian of the early Yoruba States and Affairs.

The second school of thought on Ekiti's origin is more likely and grounded in actual history. It was said that Oduduwa, the ancestor of the Yoruba traveled to Ife [Ife Ooyelagbo] where he met people who were already settled there. Among the elders he met in the town were Agbonniregun [Stetillu], Obatala, Orelure, Obameri, Elesije, Obamirin, Obalejugbe just to mention a few. It is known that descendants of Agbonniregun [Baba Ifa] settled in Ekiti, examples being the Alara and Ajero who are sons of Ifa. Orunmila [Agbonniregun] himself spent a greater part of his life at Ado. Because of this, we have the saying 'Ado ni ile Ifa' [Ado is the home of Ifa]. The Ekiti have ever since settled in their present location.

Nobody can give accurate dates to these events due to the lack of written sources, but people have lived in Ekiti for centuries. It is on record that Ekiti Obas had a prosperous reign in the 13th century. An example was the reign of Ewi Ata of Ado-Ekiti in the 1400s.

About the Ekitis, Samuel Johnson had this to say:

"Historically, the Ekitis are among the aboriginal elements of Nigeria absorbed by the invaders from the East (Yoruba people from Ile Ife). "The term Ekiti denotes a "Mound", and is derived from the rugged mountainous feature of that part of the country. It is an extensive province and well-watered, including several tribes and families right onto the border of the Niger, eastward. They hold themselves quite distinct from the Ijesas, especially in political affairs." (Samuel Johnson, The History of the Yoruba, 1921). It is believed that the ancestors of the Ekiti people who came to combine with the aboriginal people on the land migrated from Ile Ife, the spiritual home of the Yoruba people. According to oral and contemporary written sources of Yoruba history, Oduduwa, the ancestor of the Yoruba traveled to Ife [Ife Ooyelagbo] where he met people who were already settled there. Among the elders he met in the town were Agbonniregun [Stetillu], Obatala, Orelure, Obameri, Elesije, Obamirin, Obalejugbe just to mention a few. It is known that descendants of Agbonniregun [Baba Ifa] settled in Ekiti, examples being the Alara and Ajero who are sons of Ifa, Orunmila [Agbonniregun] himself spent a greater part of his life at Ado. Due to this, we have the saying ‘Ado ni ile Ifa’ [Ado is the home of Ifa]. The Ekiti have ever since settled in their present location. The early Ekiti country is divided into 16 districts (and it has been maintained to this day), each with its own Owa or King (Owa being a generic term amongst them) of which four are supreme, viz. : — (1) The Owore of Otun, (2) The Ajero of Ijero, (3) The Ewi of Ado and (4) The Elekole of Ikole. The following are the minor Ekiti kings: — (5) Alara of Aramoko, (6) Alaye of Efon Alaye, (7) Ajanpanda of Akure, (8) Ologotun of Ogotun, (9) Olojudo of Ido, (10) Attah of Aiyede, (11) Oloja Oke of Igbo Odo, (12) Oloye of Oye, (13) Olomuwo of Omuwo, (14) Onire of Ire, (15) Arinjale of Ise and (16) Onitaji of Itaji. The Orangun of Ila is sometimes classed among them, but he is only Ekiti in sympathy, being of a different family."

The modern Ekiti state was formed from part of Ondo in 1996. Prior to this, it was part of the Ondo Province in the Western Region of Nigeria. While the non-Ekiti part of the region largely dominated geographically, Akure which was then regarded as an Ekiti town was the headquarters of Ondo province.

== Geography ==
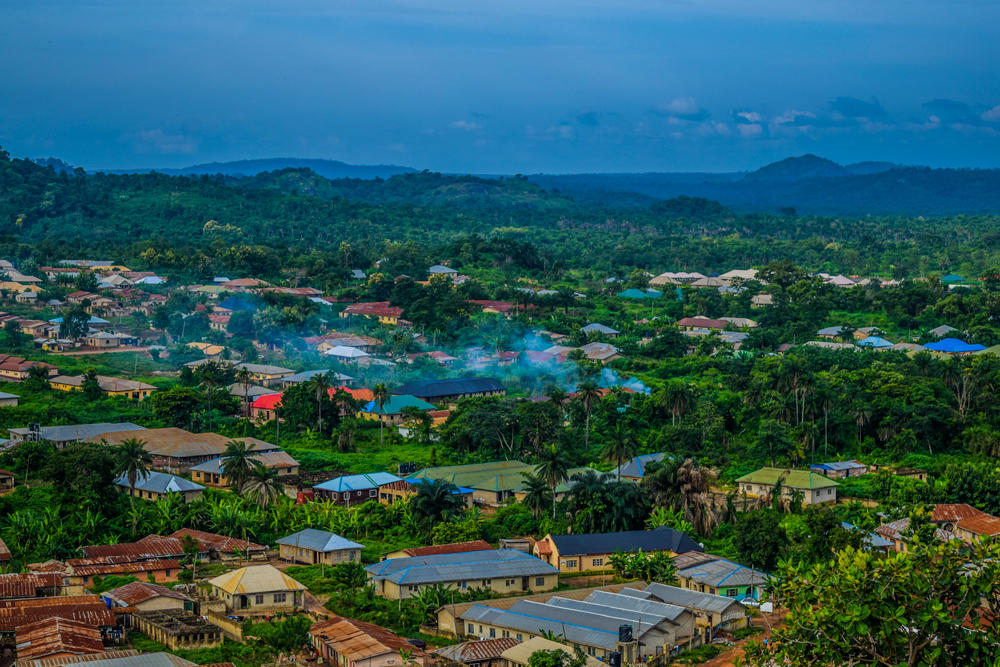
View from the top of one of The Iworoko Mountains in Ekiti State.

The State is mainly an upland zone, rising over 250 m (820 ft) above sea level. It lies on an area underlain by metamorphic rock. It is generally an undulating part of the country with a characteristic landscape that consists of old plains broken by step-sided out-crops that may occur singularly or in groups or ridges. Such rocks out-crops exist mainly at Aramoko, Efon-Alaiye, Ikere-Ekiti, Igbara-odo- ekiti and Okemesi-Ekiti. The State is dotted with rugged hills, notable ones being Ikere-Ekiti Hills in the south, Efon-Alaiye Hills on the western boundary and Ado-Ekiti Hills in the centre.

=== Climate and vegetation ===
The State enjoys a tropical climate with two distinct seasons. These are the rainy season (April–October) and the dry season (November–March). Temperature ranges between 21° and 28 °C with high humidity. The southwesterly wind and the northeast trade winds blow in the rainy and dry (Harmattan) seasons respectively. Tropical forest exists in the south, while savannah occupies the northern peripheries.

== Towns and administrative divisions ==
=== Local Government Areas ===
Ekiti State consists of sixteen Local Government Areas. They are:

- Ado-Ekiti
- Ikere
- Oye
- Aiyekire (Gbonyin)
- Efon
- Ekiti East
- Ekiti South-West
- Ekiti West
- Emure
- Ido-Osi
- Ijero
- Ikole
- Ilejemeje
- Irepodun/Ifelodun
- Ise/Orun
- Moba

=== Current list of Local Government Area Chairmen. ===
1 Ise/Orun: Hon. Olumide Falade 2 Gbonyin: Hon. Sade Akinrinmola 3 Emure: Hon. Oludare Paul Awopetu 4 Ido-Osi: Hon. Chief Ayodeji Arogbodo 5 Oye: Hon. Tayo Ogundare 6 Irepodun/Ifelodun: Hon. Dapo Olagunju 7 Ado-Ekiti: Hon. Deji Ogunsakin 8 Ikere: Hon. Bola Alonge 9 Ekiti South West: Hon. Lanrewaju Omolase 10 Efon: Hon. Bolaji Jeje 11 Ilejemeje: Hon. Ganiyu Bakare 12 Ijero: Hon. Abiodun Dada 13 Ekiti East: Hon. Samuel Adeniyi 14 Ekiti West: Hon. Kolawole Omotunde 15 Moba: Hon. Adeniyi Adebayo 16 Ikole: Hon. Adesola Adeyanju

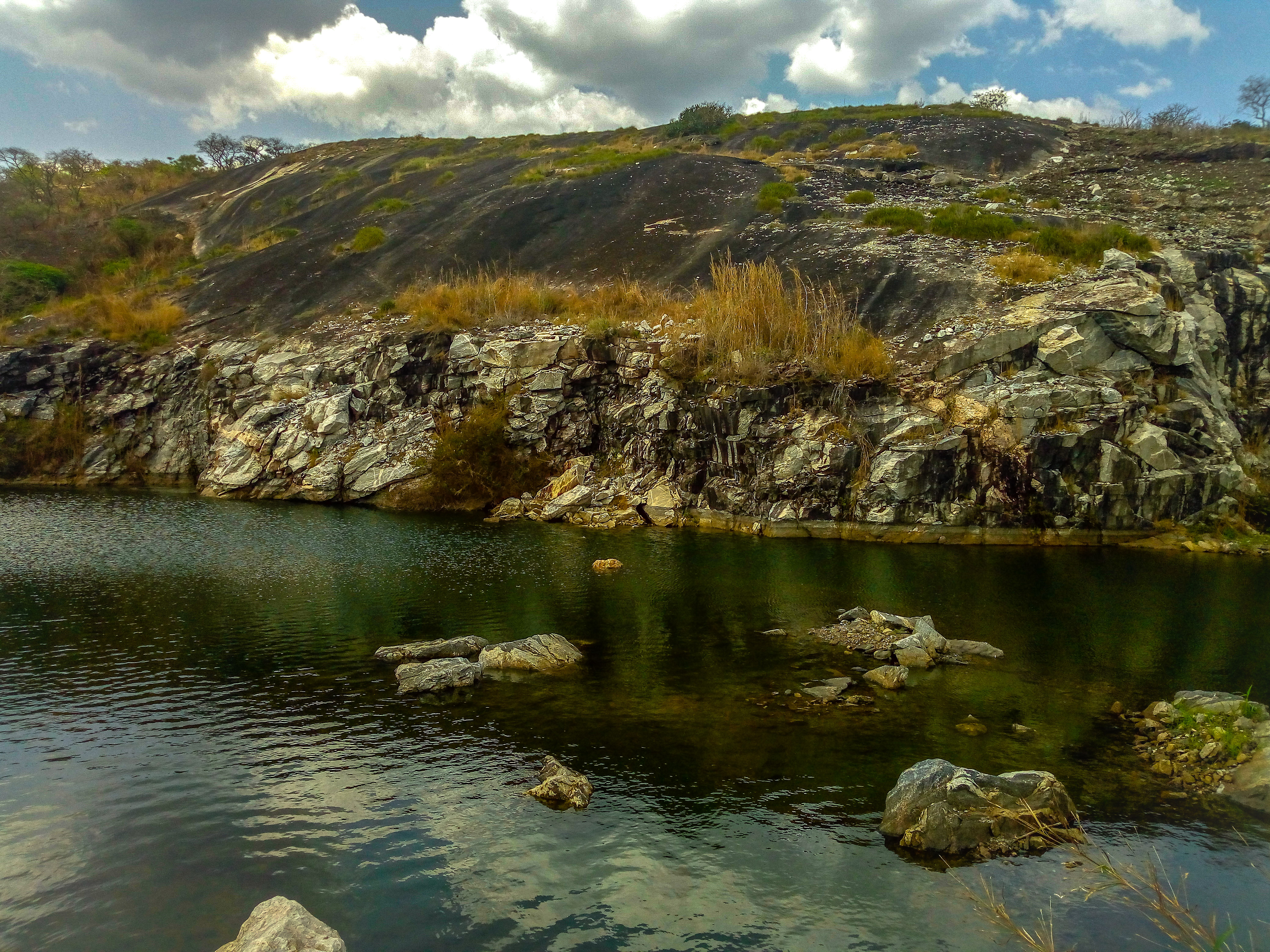
Lake in Ekiti State

=== Proposed 18 Local Council Development Areas (LCDAs) in Ekiti State ===
The Ekiti State Government in 2014, prior to the exit of the immediate past Governor Fayemi, was to create an additional 18 LCDAs based on the recommendations of the White Paper Committee set up by the government. This has, however, been cancelled by Governor Ayo Fayose.

== Demographics ==
Ekitis are culturally homogeneous and they speak a dialect of Yoruba language known as Ekiti. The homogeneous nature of Ekiti confers on the state some uniqueness among the states of the federation. Slight differences are noticeable in the Ekiti dialects of the Yoruba language spoken by the border communities to other states. For example, the people of Ado local government area do not speak exactly the same dialect as the people of Ijero Local government area, while the people of Ikole area speak something different from the people of Ikere area. The communities influenced by their locations include Otun (Moba land) which speaks a dialect close to the one spoken by the Igbominas in Kwara State. The people of Oke-Ako, Irele, Omuo speak a similar dialect to that of YagbaEkiti of Kogi State.

== Religion ==
About 85% Christian, with about 10% Muslim and 5% traditional Yoruba (Oniṣeṣe). The Anglican Province of Ondo within the Church of Nigeria includes the three Dioceses of Ekiti Oke (2004) led by Bishop Isaac Olatunde Olubowale (2004), Ekiti West (2005) led by Bishop Rufus Victor Ajileye Adepoju (2017), and Ekiti (1996) led by Bishop Andrew Olushola Ajayi (2022).

446,475 Catholics (2021) in the Diocese of Ekiti (1972 as Ado-Ekiti), a suffragan of the Archdiocese of Ibadan, with 63 parishes under Bishop Felix Femi Ajakaye (2010).

== Languages ==
Languages of Ekiti State listed by LGA:

== Education ==
Ekiti State operates the 6-3-3-4 system of education in use in Nigeria. The primary education is under the supervision of Ekiti State Universal Basic Education Board which usually partner with UBEC to ensure the development of human capacity and infrastructure as captured in the Universal Basic Education Policy. The State Ministry of Education coordinates the registration and maintenance in both private and public schools from basic to the secondary level as it is applicable all over Nigeria.

Emmanuel School (now Emmanuel Nursery and Primary School) established in 1896 was the first and now the oldest formal school in Ekiti State. Saint Joseph Nursery and Primary School, Ado-Ekiti, St. Louis Primary School, Ikere-Ekiti, Catford Nursery and Primary School, Ado-Ekiti, and EKSU Staff School are among the most popular primary schools in Ekiti State. Notable secondary schools in Ekiti State include but are not limited to Christ’s School, Ado Ekiti, Petoa City College, Ado-Ekiti, Ekiti Anglican Diocesan High School, Ado-Ekiti, New creation college, Ado Ekiti and Notre Dame College, Usi-Ekiti.

There are only five universities in Ekiti State which are namely]: The Afe Babalola University, Ado-Ekiti that was established in 2009 which has its main campus in the capital city of Ekiti State, is one of the leading private universities in Nigeria. Ekiti State University, Ado-Ekiti, Federal University Oye-Ekiti, and Venite University Iloro Ekiti and the newly established Bamidele Olumilua University of Education, Science and Technology Ikere-Ekiti are the public universities in Ekiti State. Other tertiary institutions in Ekiti State are the Federal Polytechnic, Ado-Ekiti, Crown Polytechnic Ado-Ekiti, College of Health Technology, Ijero-Ekiti.

The Ekiti has a record of having the largest industry in education with 11 professors in a family of 13. “Studies have shown that Ekiti has the largest number of educated people per square kilometre in the black world”. Ekiti, as an ethnic group, has the highest number of professors in Nigeria. “Ekiti Land has been a “beacon and source of living academic water to the black race...History had it that Ekiti produced six medical doctors who operated in ships between 1500 and 1830... before the first school was established in Nigeria (Ilesanmi, Dele Alaba, 2023).

== Transport ==
Major Roads include:

- Ado Ekiti-Igede-Aramoko Rd west from Ado-Ekiti to Osun State as Erimo-Effon Alaiye Rd,
- Ikokum-Ijero Ekiti Rd west from Ijero via Igbeja to Osun State,
- The Otun Rd north from Ido Ekiti to Kwara State,
- Omuo Ekiti-Ekinrin Rd east to Kogi State,
- Omuo Ekiti-Igbe Rd south to Ondo State,
- Ado Ekiti-Ikare Rd east to Ondo State,
- Owo-Emure Ile Rd south to Ondo State,
- Ado Ekiti-Ogbolu Rd south to Ondo State,
- southwest from Ikere to Ondo State,
- Igede Ekiti Oke Rd south to Ondo State at Ibuji.
- Ogotun Ekiti-Igbara Odo Rd to Osun State at Ipetu-Ijesha via Ikeji-Ile

=== Politics ===
The State government is led by a democratically elected governor who works closely with members of the state's House of Assembly. The Capital of the State is Ado-Ekiti.

=== Electoral system ===
The electoral system of each state is selected using a modified two-round system. To be elected in the first round, a candidate must receive the plurality of the vote and over 25% of the vote in at least two-thirds of the state local government areas. If no candidate passes the threshold, a second round will be held between the top candidate and the next candidate to have received a plurality of votes in the highest number of local government Areas.

== Natural resources ==
Ekiti land is naturally endowed with numerous natural resources. The state is potentially rich in mineral deposits. These include granite, kaolinite, columbite, charnockite, iron ore, baryte, limestone, aquamarine, gemstone, phosphate, limestone, tourmaline, gold coal in limited quantity among others. They are largely deposited in different towns and villages of Ijero, Ekiti West, Ado-Ekiti, Ikole, Ikere, Ise-Ekiti and other local government areas.

The Land is also blessed with water resources, some of its major rivers are Ero, Osun, Ose, and Ogbese. The state of hills is also blessed with a variety of tourist attractions abound in the state namely, Ikogosi Warm Springs; Arinta Water Falls; Olosunta and Orole hills of Ikere; Erin-ayonugba River at Erijiyan Ekiti; Fajuyi Memorial Park of Ado - Ekiti and so on. The Ikogosi tourist centre is the most popular and the most developed. The warm spring is a unique natural feature, and supporting facilities are developed in the centre. The spring is at present, being processed and packaged into bottled water for commercial purposes by a private company - UAC Nigeria.

Moreover, the land is buoyant in agricultural resources with cocoa as its leading cash crop. It was largely known that Ekiti land constituted well over 40% of the cocoa products of the famous old Western Region. The land is also known for its forest resources, notably timber, and in March 2022, Obeche (Triplochiton scleroxylon) was adopted as a State Tree due to its prominence and economic significance. Because of the favourable climatic conditions, the land enjoys luxuriant vegetation, thus, it has abundant resources of different species of timber. Food crops such as yam, cassava, and also grains like rice and maize are grown in large quantities. Other notable crops such as kola nut and varieties of fruits are also cultivated in commercial quantities.

== Gallery ==
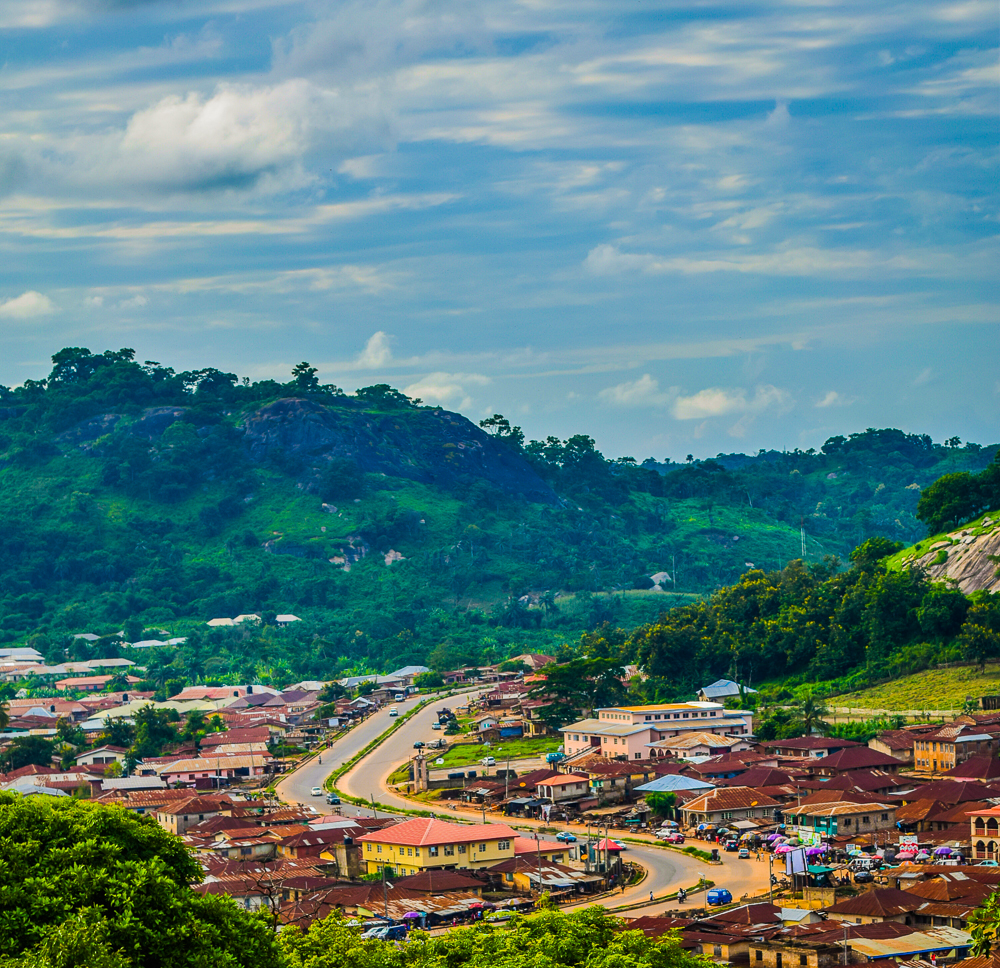
The Iworoko mountain

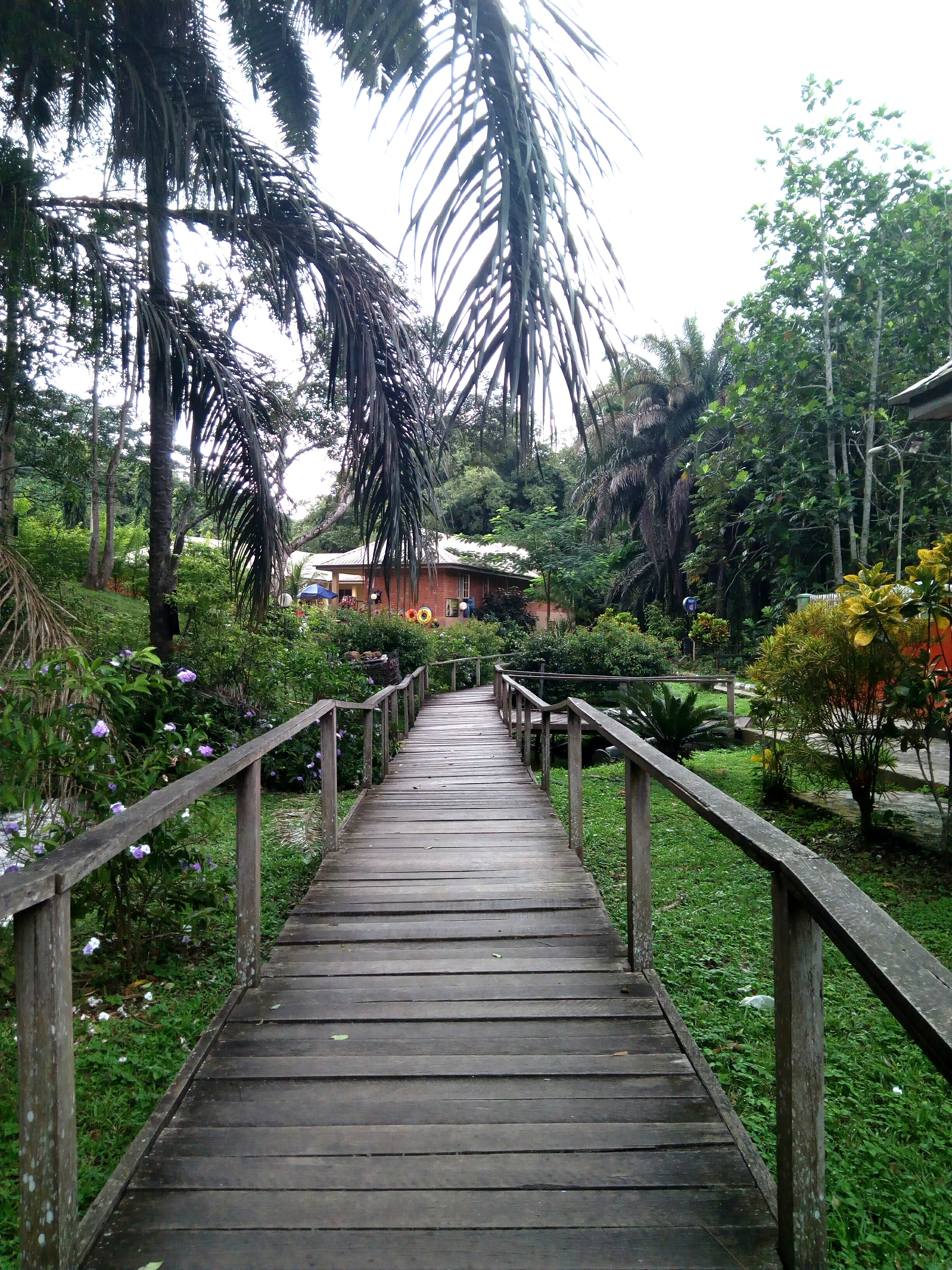
Wooden Walkway of Ikogosi Cold and Warm Spring

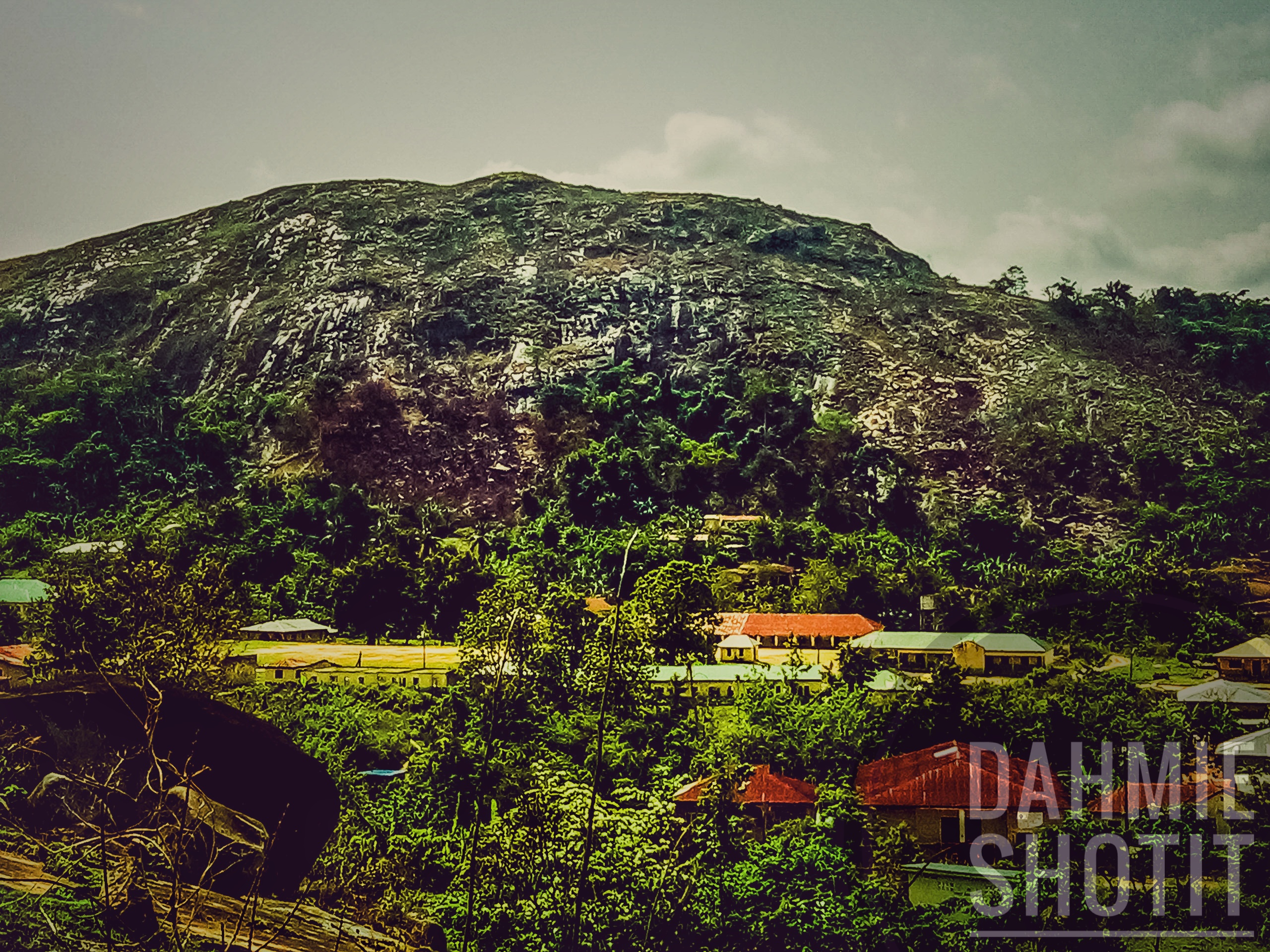
Mountain view Ilawe Ekiti, Ekiti State

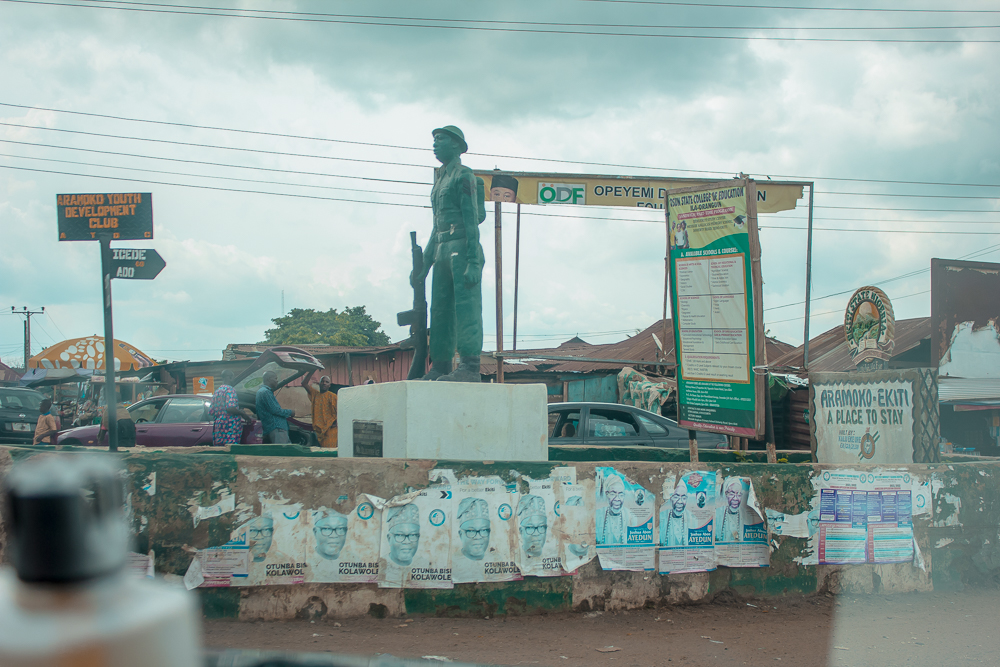
Aramoko-Ekiti Roundabout, Aramoko-Ekiti

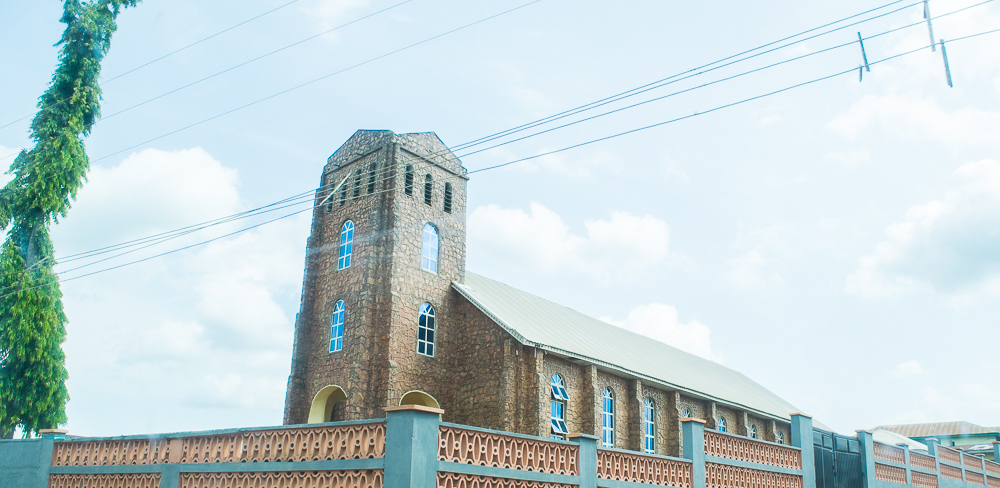
Araromi Baptist Church, Igede-Ekiti

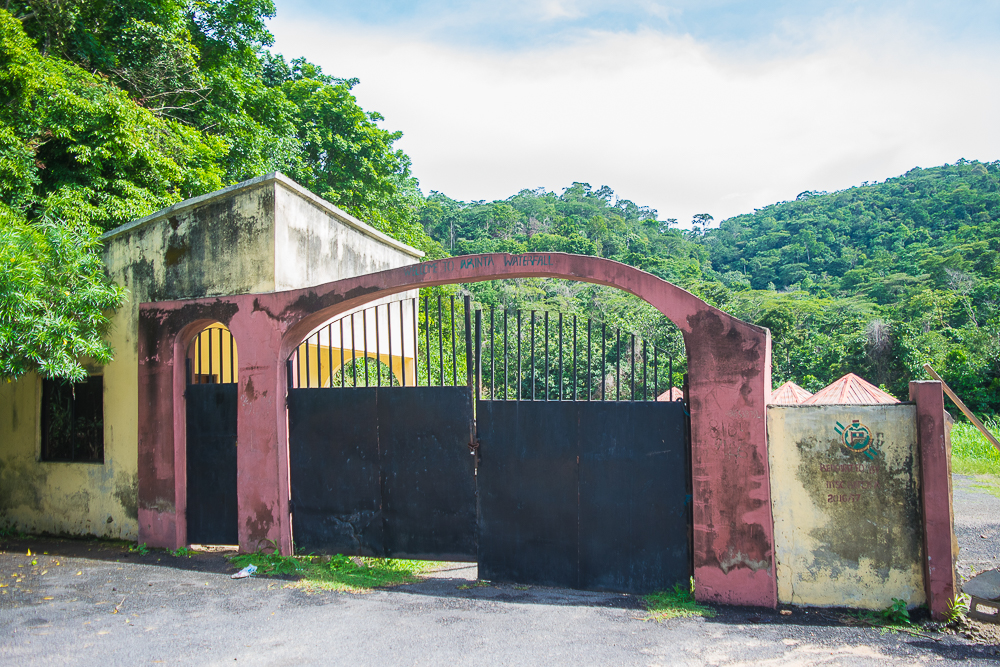
Gate into Arinta Water Fall, Ipole Iloro

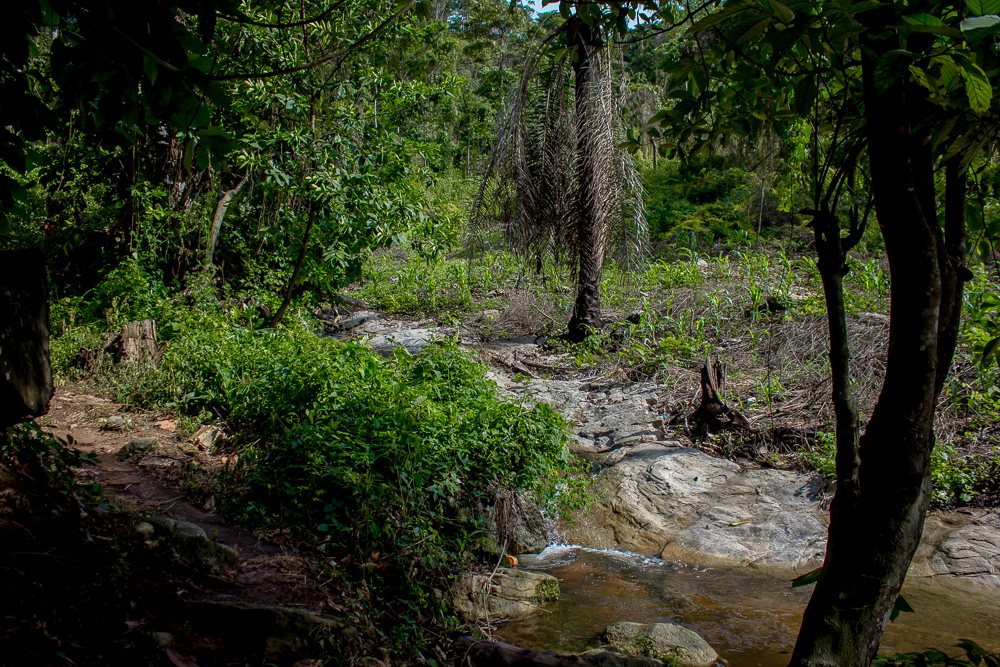
Arinta water fall

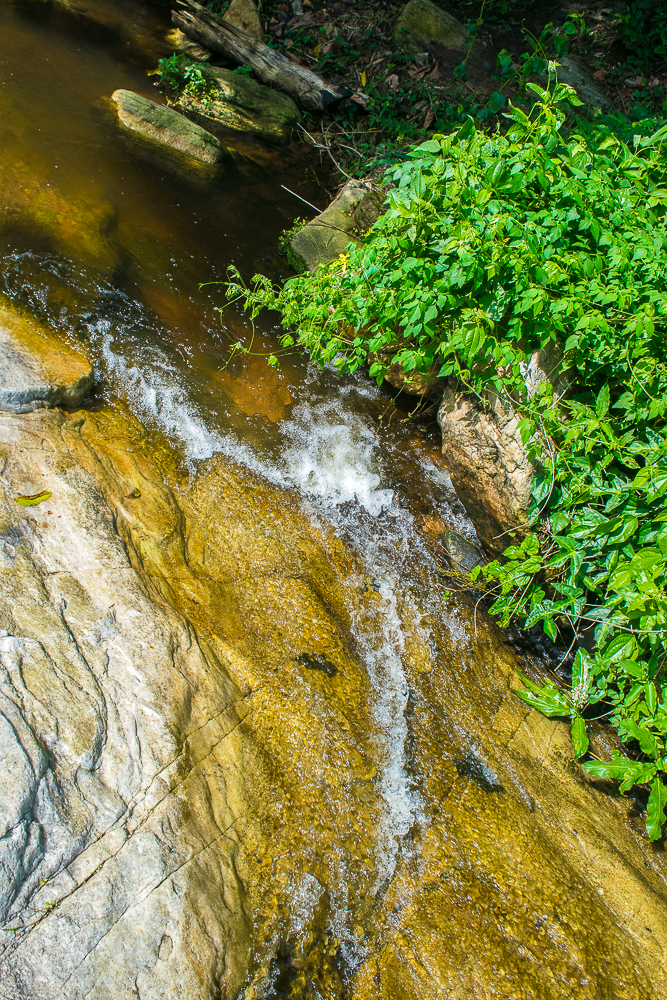
Arinta Waterfall

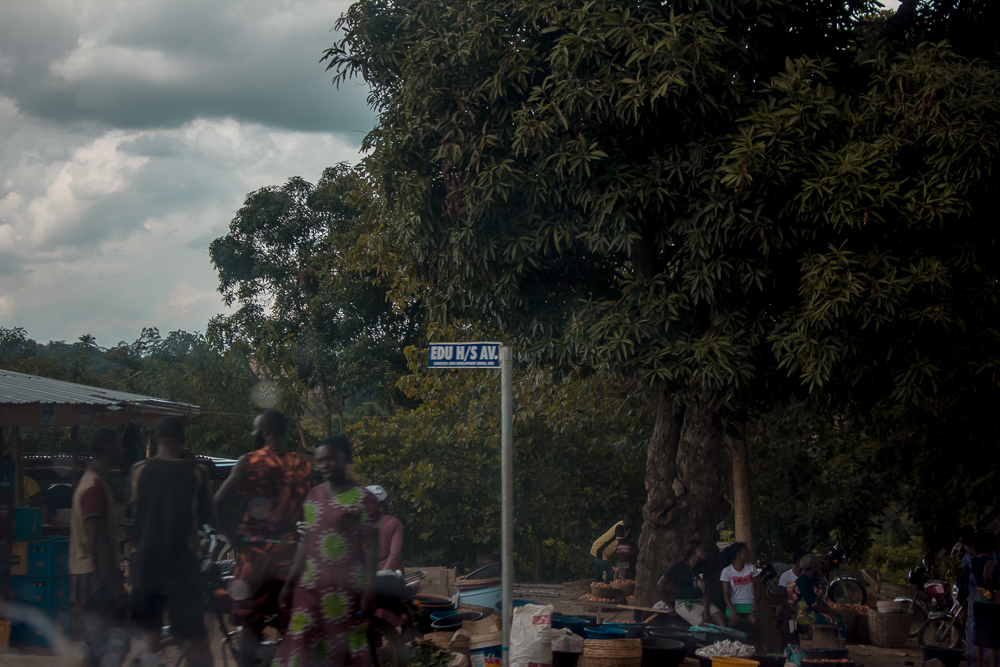
Edu High School Avenue Sign Post, Erio-Ekiti

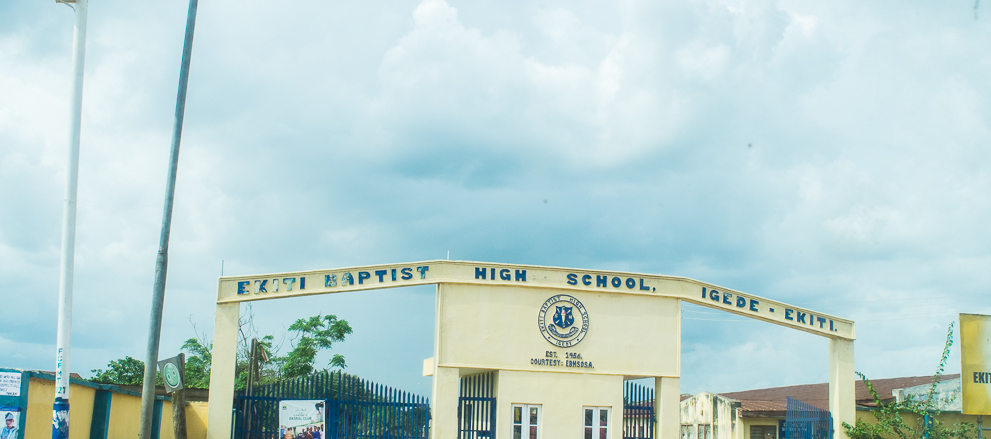
Ekiti Baptist High School, Igede Ekiti

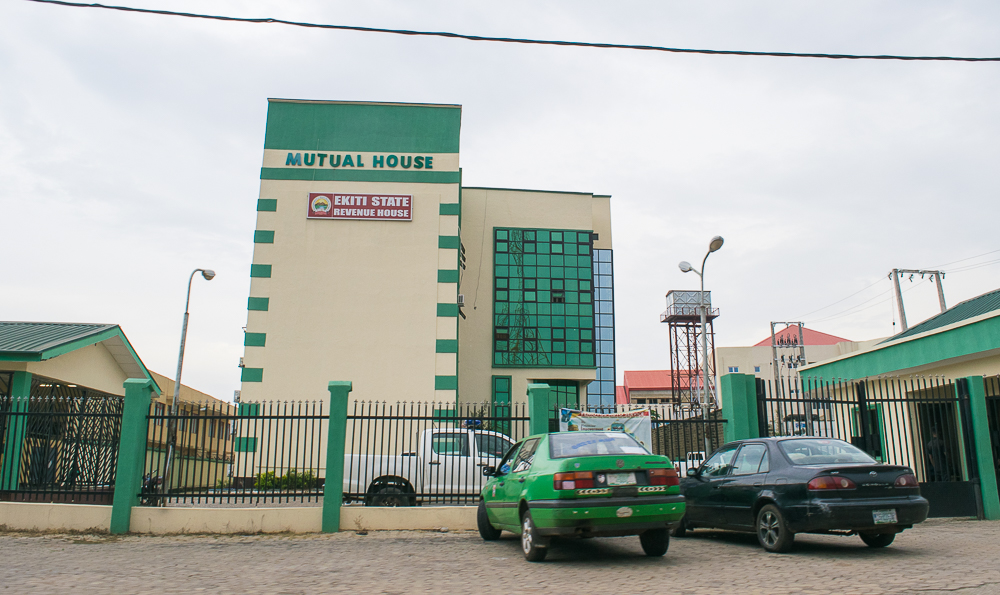
Ekiti state internal revenue house, Ado-ekiti

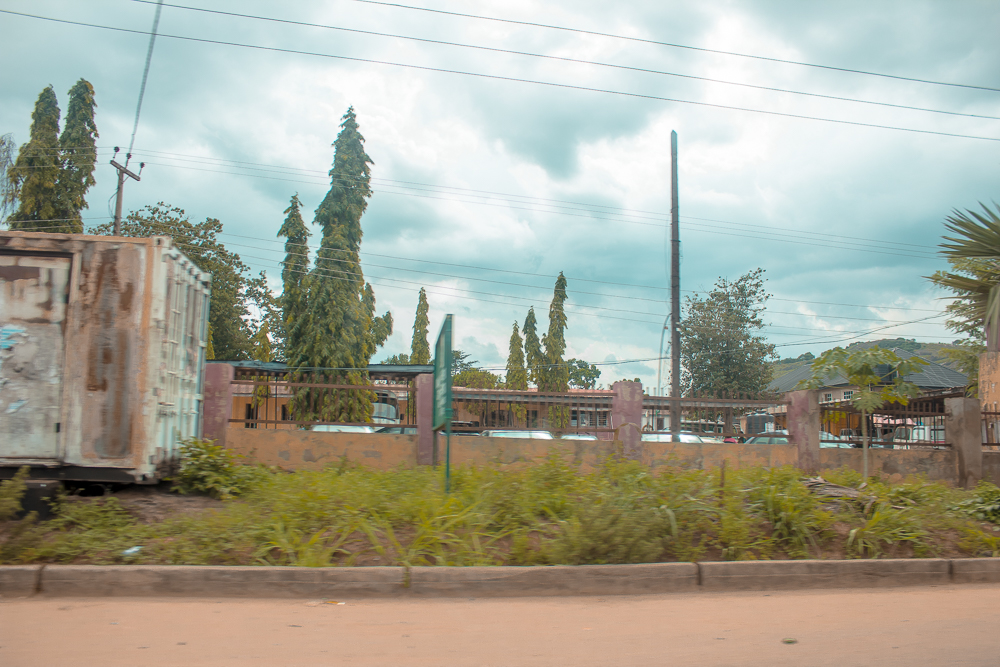
Ekiti state local government service commission

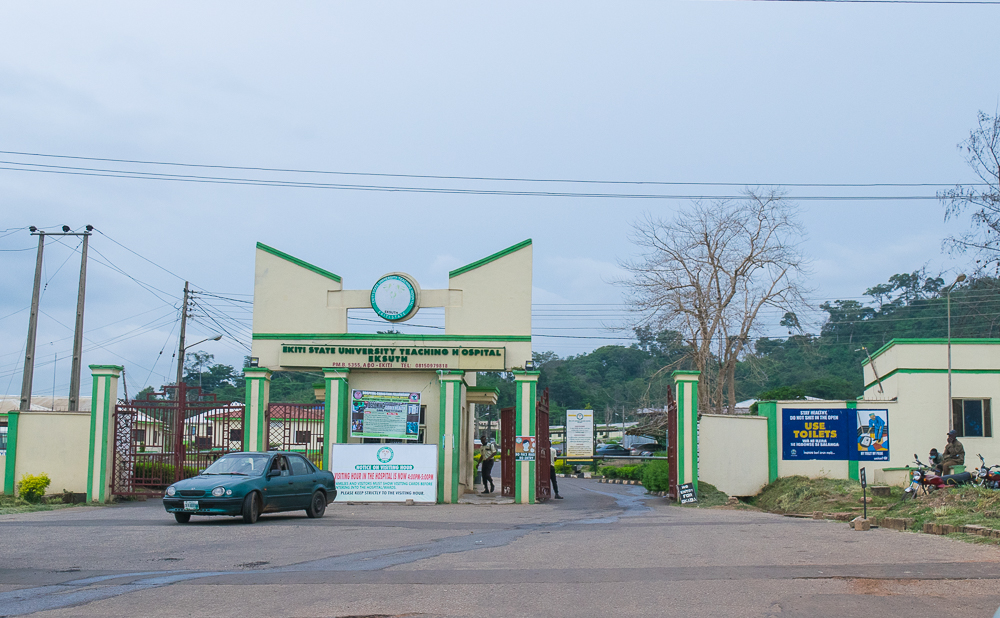
Ekiti state University Teaching Hospital, Ado-ekiti2.jpg

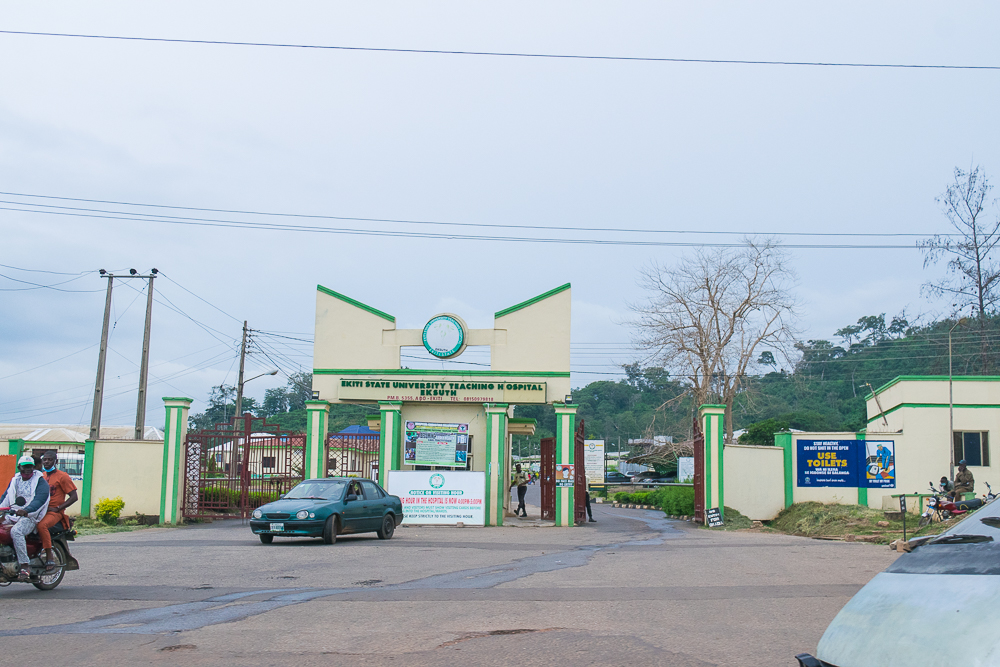
Ekiti state University Teaching Hospital, Ado-ekiti

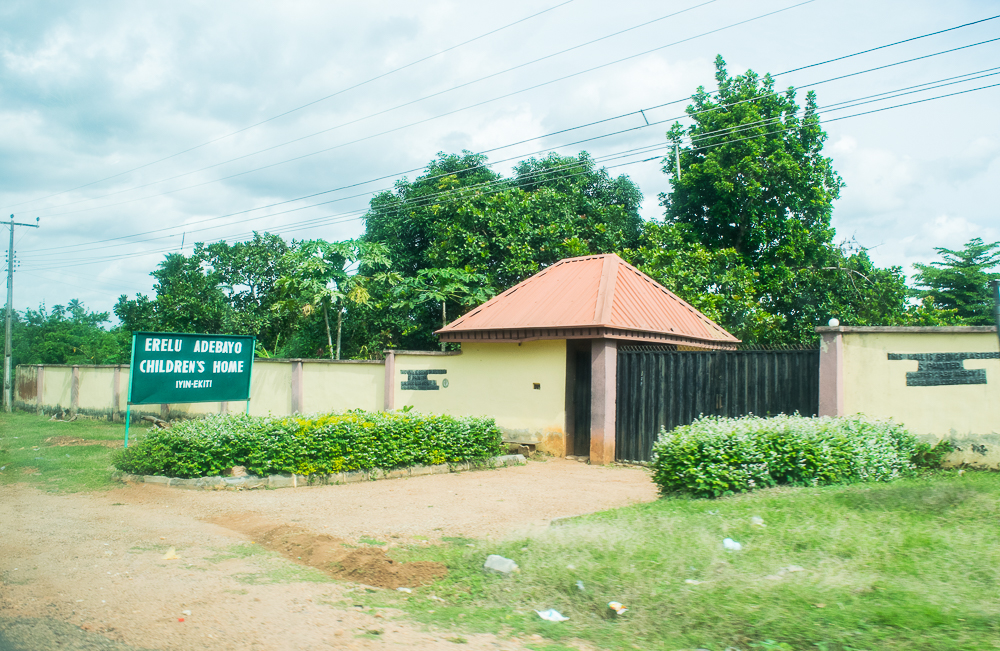
Erelu Adebayo children home, Igede-Ekiti

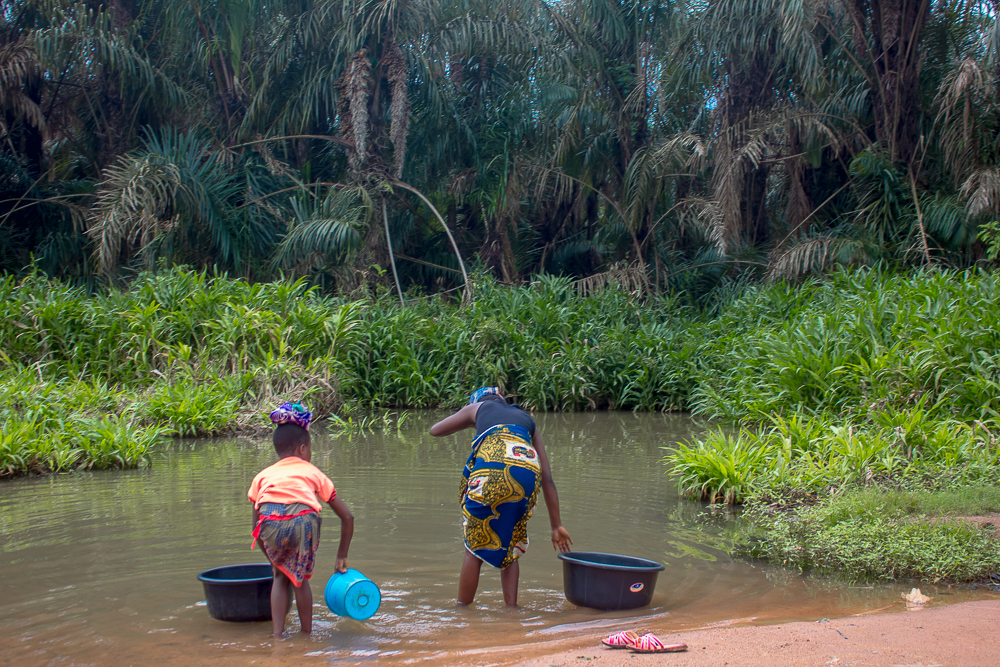
Eri Ayonigba River, Erijiyan-Ekiti

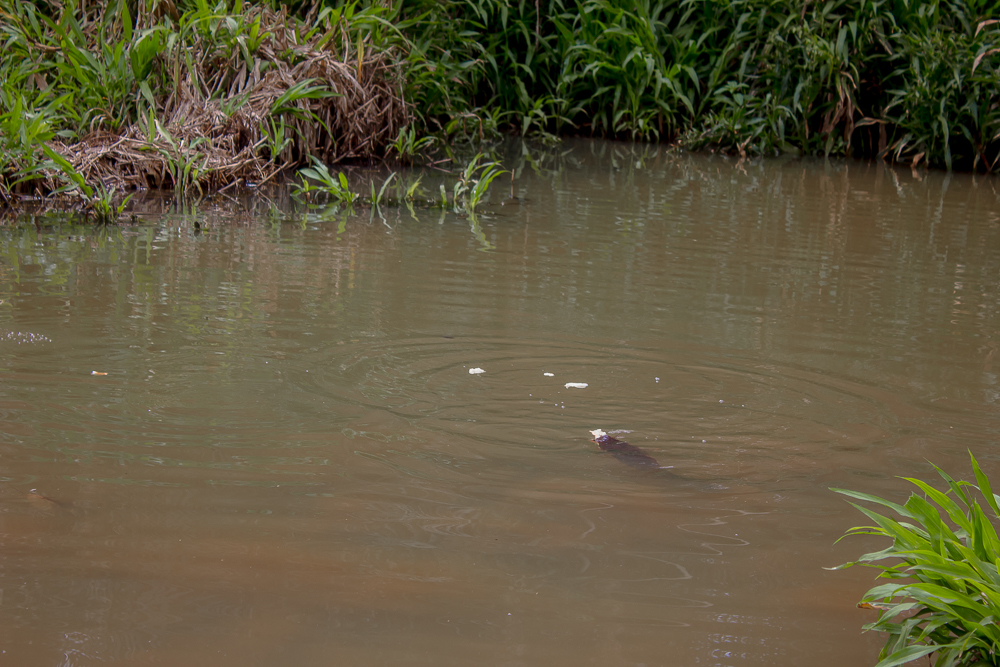
Eri Ayonigba River, Erijiyan-Ekiti

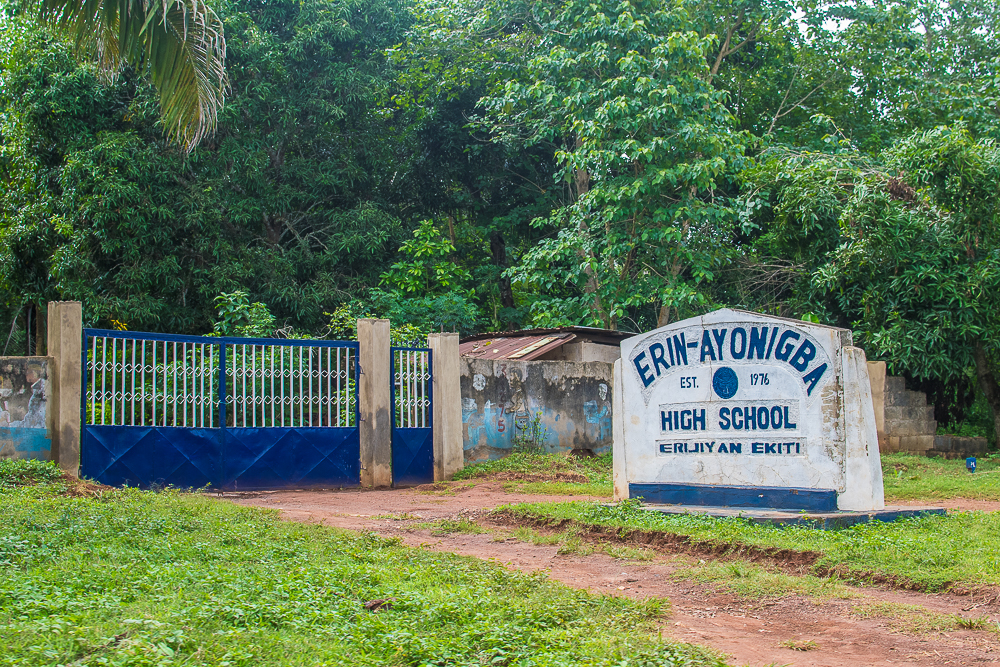
Erin-Ayonugba High School, Erijiyan Ekiti

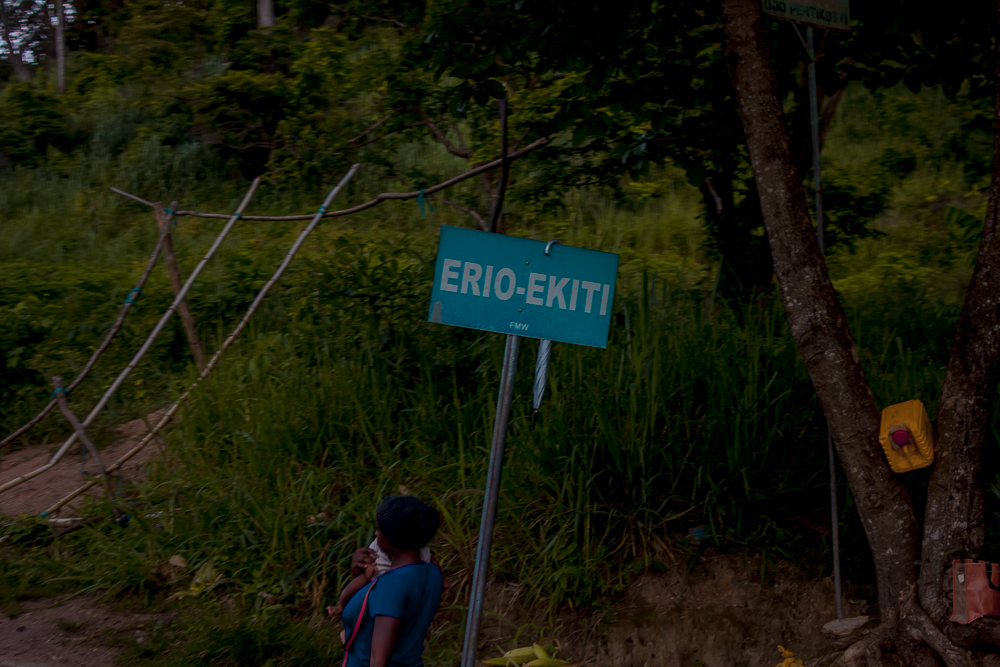
Erio-Ekiti Signpost, Ekiti state

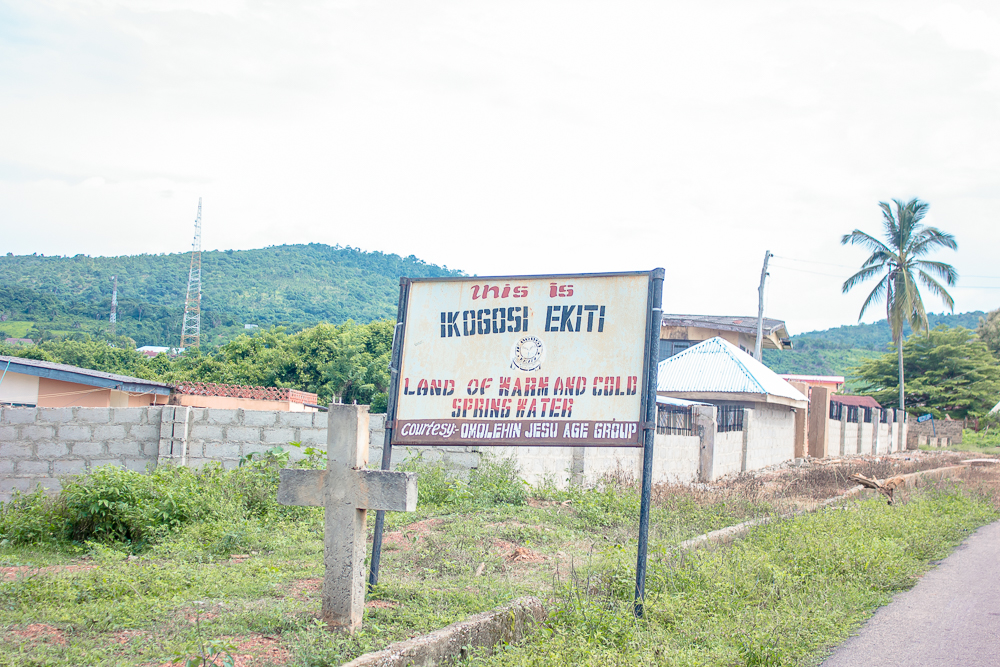
Welcome to Ikogosi signpost

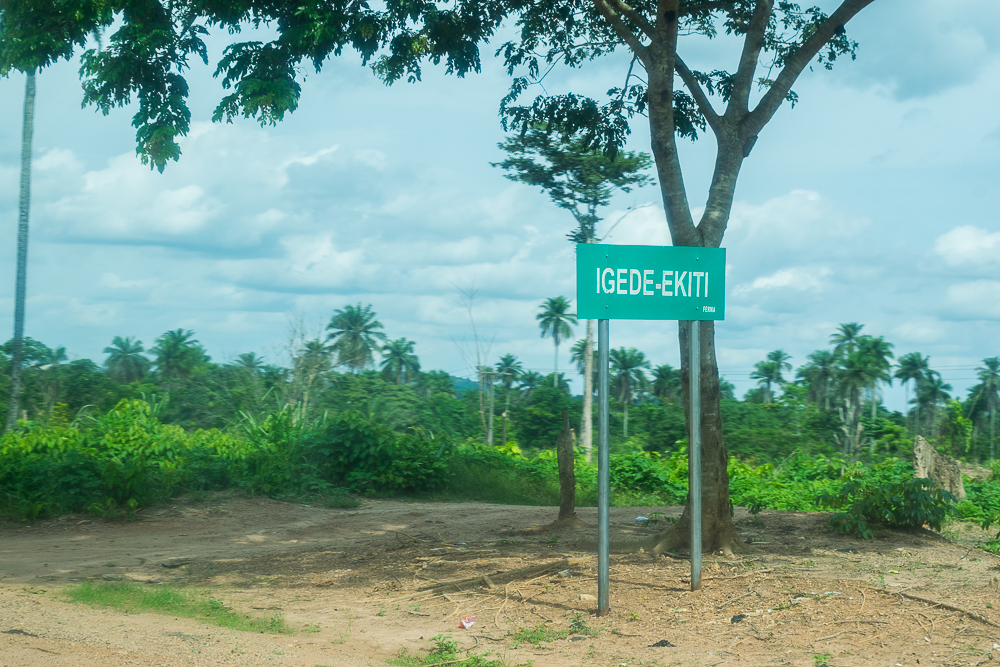
Welcome to Igede-Ekiti sign board

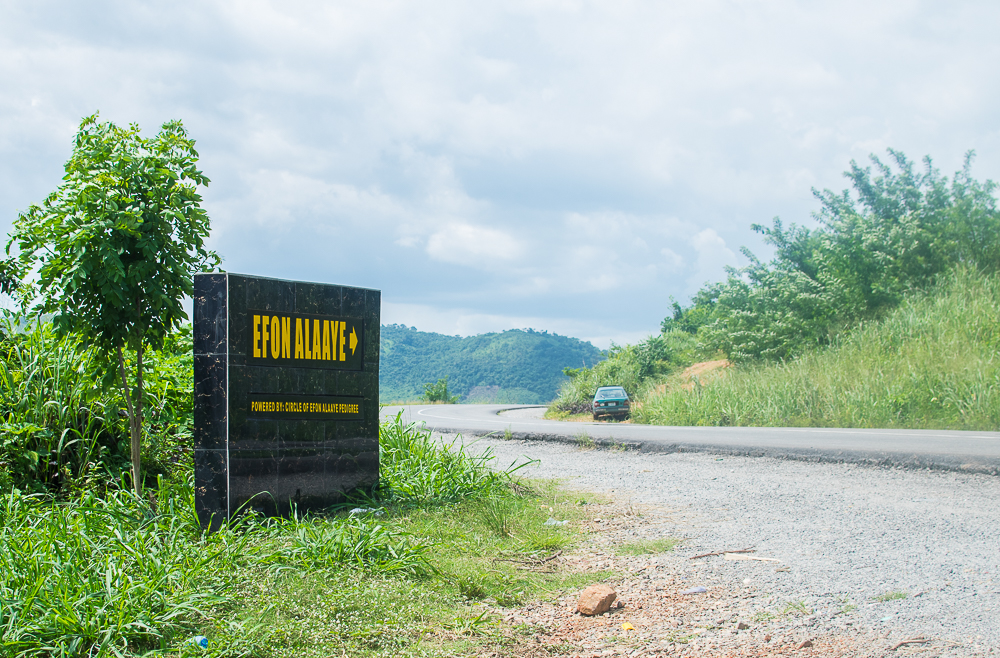
Welcome to Efon-Alaye sign board

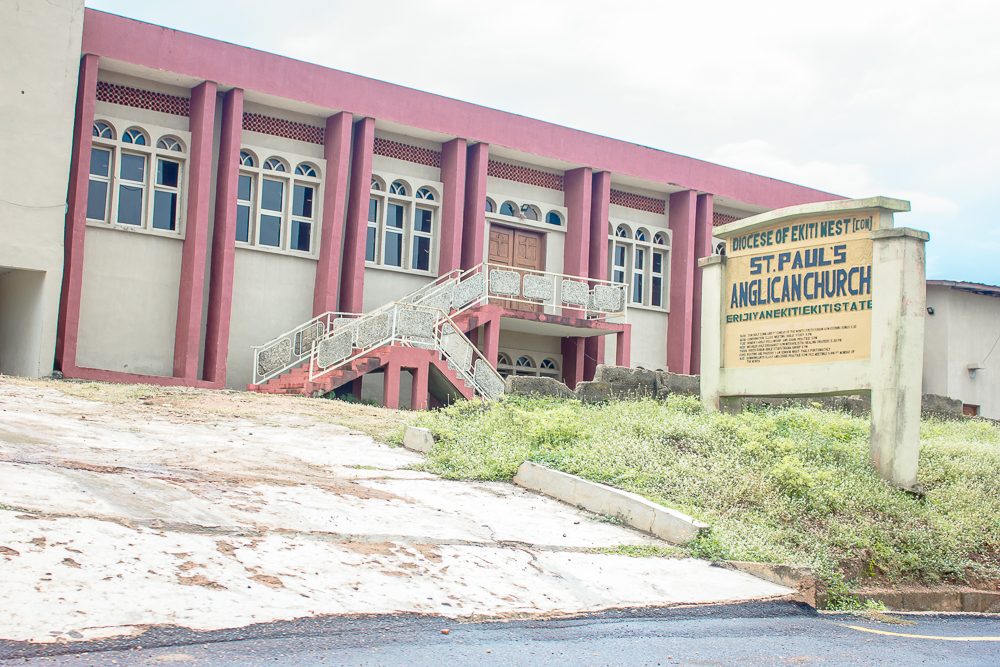
St. Paul Anglican church, Erijiyan

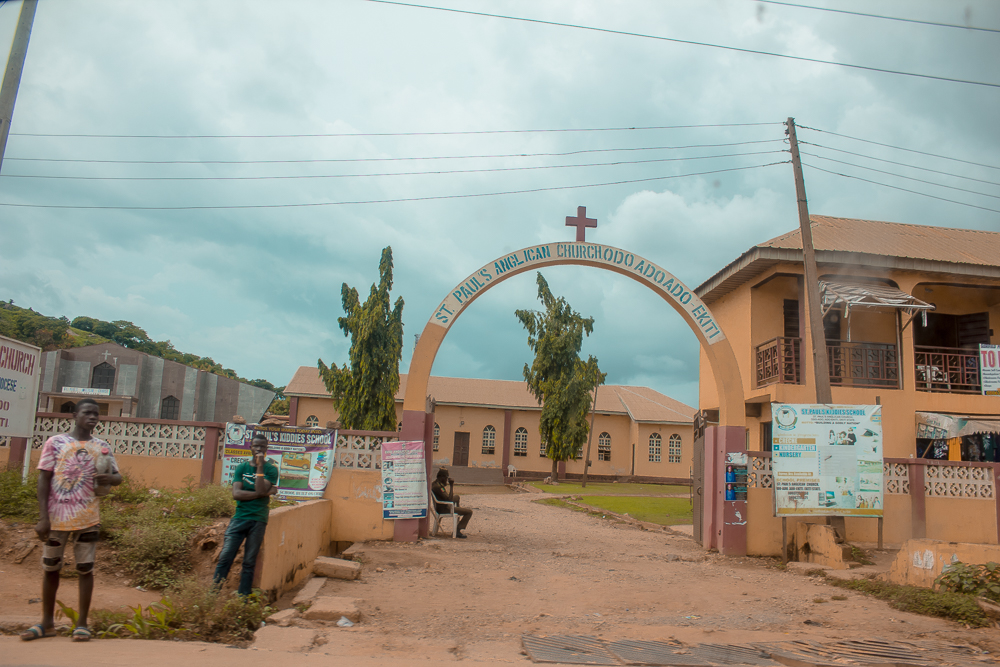
St. Paul Anglican church odo ado

== Notable people ==
- Niyi Adebayo: former governor, first executive governor of Ekiti State, (the son of Robert Adeyinka Adebayo).
- Robert Adeyinka Adebayo: Ex Governor, Western Region and Western State of Nigeria, (the father of Niyi Adebayo).
- Odunlade Adekola: actor
- Olusegun Aderemi, Monarch of Aramoko-Ekiti.
- Alhaji Abdul Azeez Kolawole Adeyemo: prominent politician
- Sade Adu: musician
- S. Banji Akintoye: history professor and writer.
- Bolaji Aluko: professor
- Gbenga Aluko: senator
- Sam Aluko: economist and father to Bolaji Aluko and Gbenga Aluko
- Niniola Apata, musician and elder sister to Teniola Apata
- Teniola Apata, musician and younger sister to Niniola Apata
- Ayodeji Awoyomi, award winning fine art photographer.
- Yinka Ayefele: musician
- Afe Babalola: senior advocate of Nigeria, philanthropist
- Rasak Ojo Bakare: professor
- Richard Bamisile: Nigerian politician and member of the Federal House of Representatives.
- Babalola Borishade: 4-time Minister of the Federal Republic of Nigeria, CFR
- Adekunle Fajuyi: First Military Governor, Western Region of Nigeria - The Region is now divided to 6 States.
- Femi Falana: senior advocate of Nigeria, activist, (the father of Falz).
- Falz: musician, (the son of Femi Falana)
- Olusoji Fasuba: sprinter and sports
- Kayode Fayemi: former governor Ekiti State
- Ayo Fayose: former governor of Ekiti State
- Zlatan Ibile: artist, dancer
- Oluyemi Kayode: sprinter
- Babafemi Ojudu: senator, current special adviser to president
- Senator Abiodun Olujimi: a senator of the Federal Republic Nigeria representing Ekiti South constituency and deputy minority whip
- Bamidele Olumilua: former governor, Old Ondo State
- Segun Oni: politician and former governor, Ekiti State
- Niyi Osundare: poet, professor
- Sola Sobowale: actress
- Tope Tedela: actor
- Puffy Tee: record producer

== Sources ==
- Adesina Adetola. Ekiti Kete: The Value, The Virtue and The Vision. 2008. ISBN 978-978-086-696-9
- Samuel Johnson. The History of the Yoruba, 1921
- Ilesanmi, Dele A. Revisiting the Ekiti Parapo Liberation War After 137 Years, 2023. Available from: https://www.researchgate.net/publication/374157888 [accessed May 31 2024].
