= Ladipo Adamolekun =

Public administration scholar

- Born: July 20, 1942 (age 84); Iju, Ondo State
- Known for: Public Management
- Scientific career
- Workplaces: Obafemi Awolowo University; World Bank; Federal University of Technology Akure
- Website: http://www.adamolekun.com/

Ladipo Adamolekun (born July 20, 1942) is a Nigerian public administration scholar, former dean of the Faculty of Administration at Obafemi Awolowo University and was a lead public sector management specialist at World Bank.

== Life ==
He was born in Iju, a town close to Akure and Idanre in Ondo State to the family of Joshua Famutimi Adamolekun, a farmer and Juliana Bamo (née Falade). His mother was born to David Bamidele Falade and Comfort Ojubutu, and was born a few months before Juliana was born. Educated at Oyemekun Grammar School and Christ's School Ado Ekiti. He earned a first class degree in French at the University of Ibadan, a master's degree in Public Administration at Ife and a doctoral degree in politics at Oxford University. He joined the faculty of Administration at the Obafemi Awolowo University of Ife, in 1968, and from 1979 to 1982, he was dean of the faculty. During his tenure at Ife, he focused on the institutions of administration in Africa especially the transplanted French traditional norms of Administration in francophone countries and civil and political management in Nigeria.

== Research ==
In 1976, he published the book, "Sekou Toure's Guinea", one of the few English language books on Guinea at the time. His book lauded some of Sekou Toure's effort in nation building, the diminution of ethnic rivalry and improvement in equality. Though, he was also critical of some of his shortcomings, some critics lamented his failure to enunciate some of the problems besieging the country, including the elimination of Toure's enemies, involvement in neighboring countries and Sekou Toure's failure to improve the standard of living in the country. However, the book was credited as an important step in publishing factual reports on one of the least known countries in the world during the time.

In some of his later studies, he focused on local government reforms and the futility of centralized planning in Nigeria. Local government reforms or decentralization is one of the most prominent views held by western analysts and Africans scholars as a necessary instrument to build a solid democratic foundation. Also, since 1922, with the conduct of legislative elections in colonial Nigeria that included native citizens, nationalists who are believed to be more successful than nation builders, advocated democratic norms and decentralization against the autocratic systems of colonialism. Since then until 1960, there was a concerted effort to build decentralization into the administrative system, this came to an end with the coming of independence in 1960. Adamolekun views on local government and decentralization in the post-independence period is one of deconcentration of power in the local government of many African societies. Deconcentration is a scenario when only responsibility or authority is transferred, but not resources or local accountability. This is in Contrast to devolution, when there is transfer, by law and other formal actions, of responsibility, resources, and accountability, the system of devolution is believed to be necessary for good governance in local administration. The scenario also led to the flight of top officials who won elections at the local level but seeing the feeble authority in local governance, subsequently left to join the state or federal executive level. He also considers as fundamentally weak, top level political and administrative management, which contributed to the failure of government planning. He asserted a lack of imbalance with a connection that both political and administrative leaders share a certain level of weakness. In contrast to popular belief of political weakness and administrative effectiveness. He also sees continuity in the midst of constant regime changes in contrast to perceived belief that regime changes can bring improvement in administrative structures or to the civil service.

=== Selected books ===
- Public Administration in Africa: Main Issues and Selected Country Studies. ed, Westview Press (July 1999). ISBN 0-8133-3653-8
- Politics and Administration in Nigeria. African Books Collective Ltd (1993) ISBN 978-2461-81-4
- Sekou Toure's Guinea: An Experiment in Nation Building. Methuen (August 1976). ISBN 0-416-77840-2
- The fall of the second republic. Spectrum Books (1985). ISBN 978-2265-13-6
- Nigeria's ombudsman system: Five years of the Public Complaints Commission. Heinemann Educational Books (1982). ISBN 978-129-469-8
- 1977, (with Jide Osuntokun), Government and Politics for West African Students, Ibadan, Heinemann
- 1979: (ed. with L. Rowland), the New Local Government System in Nigeria, Ibadan, Heinemann.
- 1979: (ed. with A. Gboyega), Leading Issues in Nigerian Public Service, Ile-Ife, University of Ife Press.
- 1983: Public Administration, a Nigerian and Comparative Perspective, London, Longman. Reprinted in 1986.
- 1983: (with M. A. Adeyoju, C.A.B. Olowu and S.N. Ekwudu), the Administration of Intergovernmental Relations in Federal Systems, Lagos, Federal Government Printer.
- 1985: ed. Nigerian Public Administration, 1960–1980. Perspectives and Prospects, Ibadan, Heinemann.
