= Ise Forest Reserve =

Protected area in Ekiti state Nigeria

Ise Forest reserve
- IUCN category V (protected landscape/seascape)
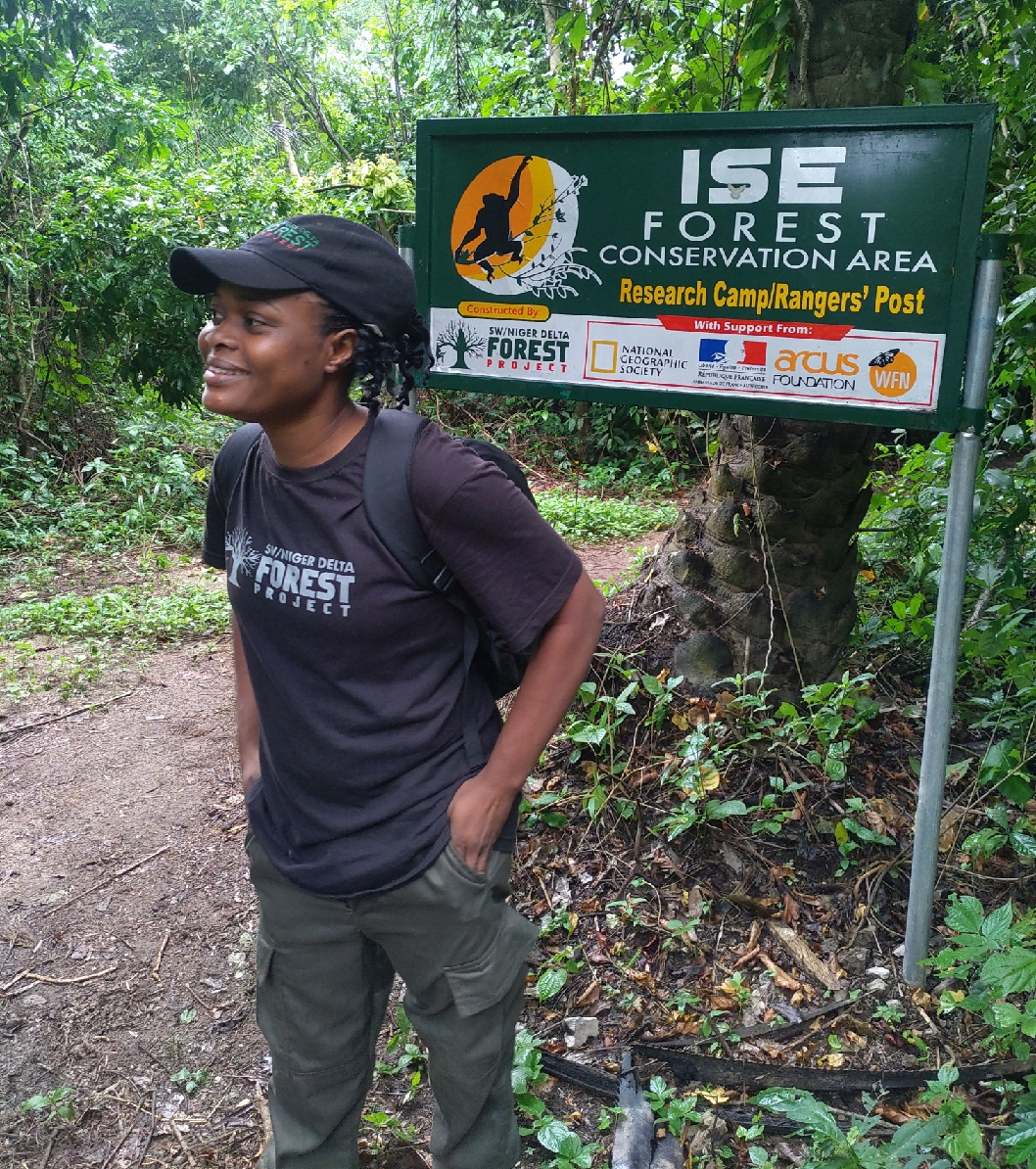
- Location: Ekiti State, Nigeria
- Nearest city: Akure and Benin
- Area: 142 km^{2} (55 sq mi)

Ise Forest Reserve is located in Ekiti State, southwestern Nigeria, covering 142 km^{2}, 5° 20.804'E to 5° 25.331'E longitude and 7°21.069'N to 7° 25.579'N latitude in the tropical hemisphere. The protected area is about 9 km to the southern part of the reserve along the Akure-Benin expressway from the Uso community in Ondo State. It remains one of the remaining forest fragments in southwest Nigeria, militated with intense human anthropogenic activities such as farming, logging, and hunting. However, they are considered to be integral and desirable components of forest ecosystems. It is one of the priority conservation areas for the endangered Nigeria-Cameroun chimpanzees (Pan Troglodytes Elliott) in Nigeria with a degrading forest environment. The estimated terrain elevation above sea level is 366 metres or 1,201 feet. This is the chimpanzees' primary and most frequently recorded habitat in southwest Nigeria. It is also a habitat for about 661 species of butterflies and a large community of other animals and plants. It has been in the spotlight for nearly 20 years. One of the protected sites in the tropical hemisphere is the Ise Forest Reserve. Most of the forests in Nigeria, including protected areas, are under severe fragmentation. The result is that smaller fragments have fewer numbers of animals than the single larger fragments.

The forest were heavily used for farming, logging, and hunting. With a deteriorating forest ecosystem, it is one of Nigeria's top conservation priority places for the critically endangered Nigeria-Cameroon chimpanzees (Pan troglodytes ellioti). This animal is available in many forested areas of the Nigeria region, but it has gone into extinction locally in many areas over the last few decades. It has been established that once deforestation on a major scale combines with hunting, the effect on wildlife populations could be terminal.

== Climate ==
Ise Forest Reserve boasts a tropical climate classified as Aw by the Köppen-Geiger system. This climate is characterized by distinct wet and dry seasons, with a mean annual temperature of 25.3 °C (77.5 °F). The highest average temperature occurs in February at 27.4 °C (81.3 °F), while the lowest is recorded in August at 23.3 °C (73.9 °F). Temperature fluctuations between months are relatively moderate, creating a climate that is generally warm and suitable for visitation throughout the year.

Precipitation patterns in the forest reserve contribute to the distinct wet and dry seasons. The rainy season spans from April to October, with September being the wettest month, receiving an average of 221 milimetres (8.7 inches) of rainfall. In contrast, December sees minimal precipitation, with only 9 milimetres (0.4 inches). The fluctuation in rainfall is quite notable, with a variance of 212 mm between the driest and wettest months. This variability is important to consider when planning activities or travel in the region.

The Ise Forest Reserve specifically receives 1,380 mm (54 in) of rainfall each year. Throughout the wet season (April to October), the rainfall is consistent and distributed nearly evenly. A very minor perennial river flows close to the reserve's eastern side and the Ogbese River passes through the reserve's western limits near the Ogbese River. The average lowest and maximum temperatures are 19 °C and 33 °C, respectively, with the average yearly temperature falling between 25 °C and 28 °C. 1200 mm or less of precipitation falls per year.

Relative humidity in the forest reserve follows a similar pattern, reaching its peak in September at 88% and dropping to its lowest in January at 49%. This variation in humidity contributes to the overall perception of comfort and plays a role in the local ecosystem's dynamics.

Sunshine hours, an essential aspect of climate, exhibit distinct seasonal variations. January enjoys the highest number of daily sunshine hours, averaging 8.86 hours, contributing to a total of 274.55 sunlight hours for the month. In contrast, July also experiences the least daily sunshine hours at 3.45, accumulating to a total of 106.88 hours. Throughout the year, the forest reserve receives approximately 2131.53 hours of sunshine, with an average monthly duration of around 70.21 hours.

Climate data for Ise Forest Reserve (Ise)
Month	Jan	Feb	Mar	Apr	May	Jun	Jul	Aug	Sep	Oct	Nov	Dec	Year
Mean daily maximum °C (°F)	33.6 (92.5)	34.2 (93.5)	33.4 (92.1)	31.7 (89.1)	30.1 (86.1)	28 (83)	27.4 (81.4)	27 (81)	28.1 (82.5)	29.1 (84.4)	30.8 (87.5)	32.6 (90.7)	30.5 (87.0)
Daily mean °C (°F)	26.8 (80.2)	27.4 (81.3)	27.0 (80.6)	26.2 (79.1)	25.3 (77.5)	24.1 (75.4)	23.4 (74.2)	23.3 (73.9)	23.6 (74.5)	24.3 (75.7)	25.5 (77.9)	26.2 (79.1)	25.3 (77.5)
Mean daily minimum °C (°F)	21.6 (70.8)	22.9 (73.2)	23.6 (74.4)	23.4 (74.1)	22.9 (73.2)	22.1 (71.7)	21.4 (70.5)	21.2 (70.1)	21.5 (70.7)	21.9 (71.4)	22.4 (72.3)	21.5 (70.7)	22.2 (71.9)
Average precipitation cm (inches)	0 (0)	2.5 (1)	5.1 (2)	10 (4)	15 (6)	20 (8)	20 (8)	20 (8)	20 (8)	18 (7)	2.5 (1)	0 (0)	133.1 (53)
Average rainy days	2	4	10	14	17	19	20	19	20	18	7	2	152
Average relative humidity (%)	49	58	71	80	84	87	87	86	88	87	78	58	76
Mean daily sunshine hours	8.9	8.1	7.0	5.9	4.9	4.0	3.9	3.4	3.9	4.7	6.7	8.7	5.8
Source: climate-data.org

=== Forest Resources ===
Ise Forest Reserve is endowed with a variety of animal and plant species. Both the animals and plants of the Ise Forest Reserve are abundant. Gmelina arborea, Mansonia altissima, Tectona grandis, Alstonia boonei, Ceiba pentandra, Entandrophragma cylindricum, Terminalia ivorensis, Khaya ivorensis, and Milicia excelsa are a few of the plant species found there. Some of the fauna species include primates like Mona monkey (Cercopithecus mona), Nigerian white-throated guenon (Cercopithecuserythogaster pococki), the Nigerian putty-nosed monkey (Cercopithecus nictitans nilotus), Red-capped mangabey (Cercocebus torquatus), Olive baboons (Papio anubis) and Nigeria-CameroonChimpanzee (Pan troglodytes ellioti). Animals like the Forest Buffalo (Synerus caffernanus), Red River Hog (Potamochoerus porcus), and African Forest Elephant (Loxodonta Africana cyclotis). Some bird species, such as Cane rats, Bush Pigs, Insects, Grass cutter, Grasshopper, Bees, Cricket, Squirrel, African Black Kite, Ground Squirrel, Wart Hog, Bush Baby, Forest Hog, Water Buck, Cattle Egret, Duicker, Quail, Banana Bat, Quele Bird, Rodent, and Cerato gymnaelata's yellow-casqued hornbill Nevertheless, excessive logging and land clearing for unauthorized marijuana cultivation pose a threat to the area. Despite this, it is nevertheless crucial for the preservation of wildlife, particularly for the maintenance of ecological services in this area.

=== Hunting and Habitat Loss ===
Ekiti native forest is still being lost, broken up, and degraded; it is being used for agriculture, logging, grazing, and fire. Several forest reserves in Nigeria have been turned into farms and industrial oil palm and rubber plantations. Oil palm plantations have taken over substantial portions of the forest that once surrounded important protected areas. There are also numerous new oil palm developments in progress. Urbanization, the expansion of agricultural crop cultivation, residential construction, population growth, nonadic farming, and infrastructure development are all placing strain on Nigeria's forest resources. The expansion and degradation of both community and national forests serve as indicators of these stresses. New logging concessions are continually being constructed in the forest, and logging companies are able to quickly build and clear seasonal routes to allow the evacuation of timber all year round. The largest threat to forests comes from the long-standing human practice of hunting larger species, such as chimpanzees, for food, bush meat for use in traditional medicines, ornament, or (to a lesser extent) for sport. While the majority of animals are either shot with firearms or caught in snares designed for terrestrial creatures. Particularly in southwest Nigeria, logging has frequently been followed by the conversion of forest land to cultivation; where this occurs, chimpanzee habitat is permanently lost. Since many of the remaining Ekiti populations are now small and isolated due to a combination of habitat degradation and hunting, they are at an elevated danger of going extinct due to disease and other unforeseen circumstances. The existence of chimpanzees in Ekiti State has only ever been verified in this location. To improve conservation in Ise, the Nigerian Conservation Foundation intends to collaborate with Ekiti State.

== Causes of Deforestation In Ise Forest Reserve ==
=== Logging or Unauthorized Tree Felling ===
At the Ise Forest Reserve site, the timber sector is highly organized and receives covert assistance at all levels of government. In contrast to 30 years ago, legitimate businesses that followed well-established working schedules are now almost nonexistent on the site. Land clearing for unauthorized marijuana plantations and excessive logging are endangering the reserve's ecology. The creation of a conservation area will increase awareness of the forest and work to protect it from unlawful activity. The protected area will go a long way in bringing back species in the forest from the brink of extinction. It will also help in protecting the chimpanzee population in the forest. Nigeria's Ekiti state government has moved to establish a conservation area within the Ise Forest Reserve, an important step toward protecting the habitat of the Nigeria-Cameroon chimpanzee (Pan troglodytes ellioti)

The primary menace facing the Ise Forest Reserve is illegal logging, wherein individuals unlawfully chop down trees to obtain timber, subsequently selling it through illicit channels. This activity disrupts the natural ecosystem and has adverse effects on the reserve's sustainability and conservation efforts.

=== Expansion of Agriculture ===
Farmers clear forested regions to establish agricultural fields, often utilizing slash-and-burn techniques. This process entails cutting down trees and setting the vegetation on fire, resulting in the extensive clearing of the forest. The ramifications are substantial, leading to deforestation and significant changes in the natural scenery, potentially resulting in lasting ecological effects. Farming poses a significant peril to the Ise Forest Reserve and its biodiversity. Farmers frequently clear forested areas for agriculture using slash-and-burn techniques, causing rapid and extensive forest destruction. This results in habitat loss for wildlife and fragmentation of the forest, impeding animal movement. Moreover, farming introduces pesticides and fertilizers into the forest ecosystem, adversely affecting wildlife. Pesticides can eliminate insects and invertebrates crucial as food sources for birds and other creatures, while fertilizers can contaminate water bodies, harming fish and other aquatic life. Farming in the Ise Forest Reserve can spark conflicts between farmers and wildlife. Elephants, for instance, might forage on crops, leading to retaliatory killings by farmers. This conflict escalates the decline of elephant populations and other wildlife within the forest. Despite the Nigerian government's ban on farming in the Ise Forest Reserve, enforcement remains challenging due to limited resources and personnel. Consequently, farming continues to pose a substantial threat to the forest and its diverse wildlife.

=== Human encroachment ===
The intrusion of human settlements and activities is a significant factor contributing to deforestation in the Ise Forest Reserve. With the burgeoning population of Nigeria, more individuals are relocating to regions that were previously covered by forests. This demographic shift is resulting in the depletion of forested habitats, ultimately leading to deforestation.

== Socio-ecological vitality of Ise Forest ==
The socio-ecological vitality of the Ise Forest Reserve encompasses the intricate interplay between the forest and its dependent human communities. The forest offers a plethora of ecological benefits, including regulating the water cycle, purifying air and water, and fostering biodiversity. Additionally, it holds significant cultural and economic value for local communities.

Rich in plant and animal diversity, including endangered species, the Ise Forest Reserve holds spiritual importance for the Yoruba people, who believe it is inhabited by spirits and deities, utilizing it for various religious practices. The local communities rely on the forest for essential resources like food, medicine, and construction materials. Moreover, the forest provides economic opportunities through tourism, logging, and agriculture.

However, this socio-ecological vitality faces multiple threats, such as deforestation, climate change, and encroachment by human activities. Deforestation harms wildlife habitats and disrupts the water cycle, while climate change exacerbates these issues by intensifying heat and aridity. Human encroachment results in loss of habitat and infrastructure development, further fragmenting the forest.

Despite these challenges, there are positive initiatives within the Ise Forest Reserve. The Ekiti State government has established a new conservation zone, showcasing a commitment to preserving the forest. Additionally, various non-governmental organizations are actively engaged in safeguarding the forest and its diverse wildlife.
