= Sam Aluko =

Nigerian public economist and scholar

Chairman National Economic Intelligence Committee
- In office 1994–1999
- Succeeded by: Ibrahim Ayagi

Economic Adviser
- In office 1979–1983
- Governor: Adekunle Ajasin

Personal details
- Born: Samuel Aluko; August 18, 1929 Ode-Ekiti
- Died: February 7, 2012 (aged 82) London
- Spouse: Joyce Aluko
- Children: Bolaji Aluko; Gbenga Aluko
- Occupation: Economist
- Profession: Academic

Samuel Aluko (August 18, 1929 – February 7, 2012) was a Nigerian public economist and scholar who wrote articles and papers that analyzed government's social and economic policies. Aluko also played advisory role to some political leaders such as Obafemi Awolowo and Sani Abacha. The latter opportunity was considered unusual because of Aluko's early radical stance in opposition to government excess.

Aluko's political and economic thought are marked by criticism of opulence in the political class and increasing government income as a means to fund economic development. He was a well known commentator on public finance and was critical about international multilateral development banks constructs and policies about Nigeria's economic conditions and the solutions prescribed to solve economic problems.

== Life ==
Born in Ode-Ekiti to the family of Aluko Fagbohun, he was educated at Emmanuel School and Christ's School Ado Ekiti, where he was a student under prominent Ekiti teachers such as Nathaniel Adamolekun who later became registrar of University of Ibadan and J.E. Babatola, a former regional Minister. After graduation, he started work as a teacher, rising to become principal at Zik's College of commerce, Sapele and Vice Principal, Lagos City College. While he was teaching, he took University of London correspondence courses in economics earning a degree in the subject.

=== 1950s -1960s ===
Aluko was involved in the politics of Ado-Ekiti during the pre-independence period and was a follower of Zikist anti-colonialism philosophy. In 1953, he co-founded an independent association, Ekiti People's Party that nominated candidates to contest local elections in Ado-Ekiti, a year later he became the chairman of Ado Ekiti District Council.

Aluko's brand of economic policy was critical of ostentatious government spending. When he returned from London, he became an informal adviser to the Action Group. He was appointed to head its austerity committee which was set up to find ways to save money. The committee recommended the slashing of allowances provided to ministers and political office holders, an idea that was not well supported by some of the political class within the party. In 1962, Aluko was approached to serve as the regional economic adviser of the Western region. His salary was to be £2,942, at that time, he was a lecturer at University of Ife, now Obafemi Awolowo University earning an annual wage of £1000. He accepted the offer on the condition that his new salary be reduced to the level he was paid at Ife stating that he will not be more productive at the new job than what he was doing at Ife. But this condition was rejected by the government. While Aluko was at Ile-Ife, he was a member of an informal advisory committee of AG, along with Wole Soyinka, Victor Oyenuga, Dr Odumosu and a couple of expatriate lecturers. This group were strongly in favor of an idealistic party, a democratic socialist party that believed in curbing executive excesses, the advisory group also split with some members of the political class in terms how to engage with the national government and branching out of the Western region. Awolowo positively received some of the recommendations of this group but his deputy who was now premier of the region did not like most of the recommended policies.

In 1965, when Saburi Biobaku, the deputy Vice-Chancellor of UNIFE advised all lecturers to support the party of the day, which was NNDP, a splinter group of the Action Group led by Samuel Akintola, Aluko sided with Awolowo's side of the Action Group who were receptive of the recommendations offered by the Ife group. Aluko offered to resign and gave a 3 month notice, the resignation was accepted immediately and he was ordered to vacate official premises as soon as possible, he left the university and joined the economics department of University of Nigeria. Before the January 1966 coup, Aluko addressing a youth conference had tasked the youths to be less tribal and engage with one another to unite the regions.

Aluko's views on economic growth and public finance was less elitist and was to approach decision making by using the federal, state and local government institutions as an instrument of growing the national economy. Aluko's view was drawing funds through higher rates of taxation and tracking tax defaulters to generate government income. He also supported measures to increase workers productivity through better supervision and cutting of waste such as subsidized rent and allowances to government employees. These measure are capable of increasing government revenues that could fund policies to reduce unemployment and rural development.

=== 1970s-1990 ===
As oil production increased in Nigeria in the 1970s, Aluko was still inclined to support the thought that the state can be an engine of industrialization through funding of technical education, agriculture extension and infrastructural development. With a technical literate populace, the adoption and local reproduction of technology will be feasible. In addition, introducing mechanized farming will increase the income level of commercial farmers and the taxable income of government. Aluko's support for mechanized farming meant balanced assistance to surplus producing commercial farmers and technical and educational assistance to small scale farmers to become surplus producing farmers. Small scale subsistence farmers who mostly live in the rural areas will use some the additional income to buy more affordable productive instruments. A strong believer in planning, it became important in agricultural planning for the development of a locally initiated agriculture instruments industries to save foreign exchange and produce affordable instruments for small scale farmers.

During Ibrahim Babangida's administration, Aluko still steadfastly held on to the thought that the tiers of government had a major role to play in developing the economy. He was critical of the liberalization prescriptions of the structural adjustment programme adopted by the government. Aluko's trouble with SAP also extended to the multilateral institutions who made the recommendations and the Nigerian economists who followed the dictates of Western capitalist thought. Aluko faulted the benefits of free market currency devaluation and high interest rates that came after the programme was implemented.

== Personal life ==
Sam Aluko and his wife Joyce Aluko have six children, including Bolaji Aluko, the first born and Gbenga Aluko, a former senator and Esther Morenike Jaiyesimi. He spent most of his academic career at University of Ife and retired in 1980. He died in 2012.
