= Samuel Asabia =

Nigerian economist, administrator and banker

Samuel Oyewole Asabia (1931–1993) was a Nigerian economist, administrator and banker who was permanent secretary Western Region Ministry of Finance from 1966 to 1970. He later became the first indigenous chief executive and managing director of First Bank of Nigeria in 1975.

Asabia was head of a few organizations and committees that brought him into prominence. Between 1970 and 1975, he was deputy governor of the Central Bank of Nigeria and also chairman of the Securities Issues Commission which later became Securities Exchange Commission. Between 1975 and 1981, he was president of the Nigerian Stock Exchange and in 1983, he was vice president of the Nigerian Economic Society.

Asabia was the founding chief executive officer of First Interstate Merchant bank (now part of Unity Bank of Nigeria) and he was founding chairman of Banque Internationale du Benin in 1989.

== Life ==
Asabia was born in Idoani, his father was a deacon in his church and held the chieftaincy title of Olisa of Idoani. Asabia was educated at Christ School, Ado Ekiti and obtained undergraduate education at University of Exeter finishing with a degree in economics. Upon his return to Nigeria, he worked in the colonial administrative service starting in 1954 and rising to become an assistant district officer in 1958. Between 1958 and 1961, he worked in the Western regional Ministry of Finance and later the premier's cabinet office. He was appointed the permanent secretary of the regional ministry of Lands, Housing and Home Affairs in 1962. Thereafter, Asabia continued to rise through the ranks within the administrative service. He transferred his service to the regional Ministry of Finance in 1966 as permanent secretary.

In 1970, he was appointed deputy governor of the Central Bank of Nigeria. Asabia later assumed the executive leadership position at First Bank following the government's acquisition of majority interest from Standard Chartered Bank. Administrative activities during his tenure included recruitment and training of college graduates to replace the expatriate staff and construction of new head office in Marina, Lagos. Part of the reason for the government's takeover of Standard Bank's interest was to expand banking and credit facilities to more Nigerians and First Bank was asked to expand branches in the rural areas.
