= Oluwafemi Ajisafe =

Nigerian academic

Prof. Micheal Oluwafemi Ajisafe is a Nigerian academic, sport enthusiast and the Board of Trustees (BOT) and Council of Afe Babalola University, Ado-Ekiti (ABUAD), has appointed Prof. Michael O. Ajisafe, as the Acting Vice-Chancellor of the four-year old university with effect from January 5, 2014.

This is consequent upon the expiration of the four-year tenure of the pioneer Vice-Chancellor, Prof. Sidi Osho, on January 4, 2014. He was later appointed as the substantive vice chancellor of Afe Babalola University, Ado Ekiti, Ekiti a position he held between October 1st, 2015 to June 21st, 2019 . He is also the first Professor of Sports Science and Physical Education in Nigeria.

== Early life and career ==
Ajisafe obtained a Doctorate degree in Sport Science from Temple University, Philadelphia. He is also the first Professor of Sport Science and Physical Education in Nigeria. He has served as a member of several accrediting agency and is also the first Nigerian Director for the International Council of Sports Science and Physical Education, Berlin.
