= Ibrahim Ayagi =

PROFESSOR IBRAHIM AYAGI OFR (1940 - 2020) was a Nigerian administrator, economist and columnist who was chairperson of the National Economic Intelligence Committee during the administration of President Olusegun Obasanjo.

After a brief stint as a lecturer at Ahmadu Bello University, he made a cabinet member of the Kano State Government in charge of economic development.

== Life ==
Ayagi grew up in Unguwa Ayagi quarters of Kano, a diverse neighborhood within the city hosting a sizable number of residents from Nupe and Yorubaland. His father was an Islamic scholar who died when Ayagi was a young child. When Ayagi was of learning age, he was enrolled into a Quranic school as was customary for many of his Muslim age mates. Ayagi was introduced to Western education (boko) by friends who attended Western schools and who taught him what they had learned at school. After his father's death, his mother remarried but the family struggled financially. Ayagi then went to live with an uncle in Sarari quarters, there, whenever, his uncle's children went to school, Ayagi went along with them and was recognized as a student. After completing his primary education at Gwarzo Senior Primary School, he elected to become a pupil teacher and soon obtained teaching certificates from Wudil and Katsina Teachers Colleges. But Ayagi had interest in furthering his studies, he desired to study in London and applied to work for the BBC with the intention of attending a university in the city. He was in England working for BBC for three years but was only able to obtain a scholarship to study in Nigeria. He returned back and enrolled at Ahmadu Bello University where he earned a degree in economics, after graduation, he obtained a scholarship to further his education. In 1974, he was appointed a lecturer at ABU.

Between 1975 and 1978, Ayagi served in the cabinet of Colonel Sani Bello, as Commissioner of Economic Development and later that of Education. In his tenure at the education ministry, two science high schools were built. His interest his education continued after his retirement, when he co-founded Hassan Ibrahim Gwarzo Secondary School, Kano. In 1984, Ayagi was appointed acting director of Continental Merchant bank, formerly Chase Merchant Bank of Nigeria. As Managing Director, he was critical of the adoption of the IMF approved Structural Adjustment Programme by the Babangida administration. The same government owned majority equity in the bank, and after, a lawsuit filed by Continental Merchant Bank against the central bank, he was relieved of his position.

He returned to Kano and was appointed Director of the Kano State Foundation. The foundation built two schools, and traded in farms supplies but his tenure ended in controversy due to a confrontational style in his dealing with the state government.
