= Gbenga Aluko =

Nigerian politician (1963–2021)

Senator of the Federal Republic of Nigeria from Ekiti State South District
- In office May 1999 – May 2003
- Succeeded by: Bode Olowoporoku

Personal details
- Born: Daniel Olugbenga Aluko; 20 July 1963 Ibadan, Nigeria
- Died: 20 November 2021 (aged 58) Abuja, Nigeria
- Party: All Progressives Congress
- Parent: Sam Aluko (father)
- Relatives: Bolaji Aluko (brother)

Daniel Olugbenga Aluko (20 July 1963 – 20 November 2021) was a Nigerian politician. He was elected Senator for the Ekiti South constituency of Ekiti State, Nigeria at the start of the Nigerian Fourth Republic, running on the People's Democratic Party (PDP) platform. He took office on 29 May 1999.

== Birth and early career ==
Daniel Olugbenga Aluko was born on 20 July 1963 in Ibadan, to Professor Sam Aluko, a prominent Nigerian Economist from Ekiti State of Nigeria.

He attended Federal Government College, Ilorin, and then was admitted to the University of Benin, graduating in 1982 with a degree in Geography and Regional Planning. He went on to the College of Energy and Petroleum Studies, Oxford, England for a Post Graduate Course in International Oil Trading and Pricing.

Positions held between 1983 and 1999 included Managing Director/CEO of HYGYNIX, Executive Director of Baseline Petroleum and Chemicals and Executive Chairman of Independent Strategists. He was appointed Special Assistant to the Minister of Transport and Aviation and General Manager of Nigeria Shippers' Council from 1993 to 1995.

== Senate career ==
After taking his seat in the Senate in June 1999 Aluko was appointed to committees on Selection, Senate Services (vice chairman), Aviation, Women Affairs, Finance & Appropriation, Social Development & Sports and Local & Foreign Debts. He was appointed Deputy Chief Whip of the Senate. Later he was appointed Vice Chairman of the Gas Committee and Chairman of the Petroleum Committee. Aluko was opposed to plans to privatize the Nigerian Mint. He was appointed Chairman of an ad hoc committee to investigate the controversial closure of Savannah Bank by the Central Bank of Nigeria. In September 2002, he seconded a motion to set up an ad hoc committee to investigate alleged constitutional and budgetary breaches committed by President Olusegun Obasanjo, which could be grounds for impeachment. In October 2002, Aluko replaced Oserheimen Osunbor as Chairman of the Senate Committee on the Independent National Electoral Commission.

Aluko was involved in controversy when he was among those indicted by a panel chaired by Senator Idris Kuta that investigated financial improprieties by senators. The panel and a subsequent ad hoc committee chaired by Senator Victor Oyofo issued reports that found Aluko had overcharged for repairs to senators' quarters and overpriced computers and office equipment supplied to senate members, and recommended that he refund the excess. However, in September 2002, the Senate adopted a motion proposed by Aluko that senate should duly absolve all senators indicted in both reports.

== Later career ==
After leaving the Senate, Aluko continued in private enterprise, holding a controlling interest in Alstegg and Midlands, a Civil Engineering Firm and serving as a Director of Crest Healthcare, Consultant to DFID on Parliamentary Matters and Director of Government Affairs with Chevron Nigeria. He left the PDP for the Labour Party, on which platform he unsuccessfully contested the Ekiti State governorship election in 2007. In December 2009, Aluko returned to the PDP.

== Personal life ==
Gbenga Aluko was married to Sileola Aluko and Adebola Aluko. He had seven children, the eldest being footballers Eniola and Sone Aluko.

== Death ==
On 20 November 2021, Aluko collapsed in his Abuja office and was rushed to the hospital, where he was confirmed dead.
