= Bolaji Aluko =

Nigerian Professor of chemical engineering

Professor Bolaji Aluko
- Born: Mobolaji Ebenezer Aluko; 2 April 1955 (age 71)
- Education: University of Ife; Imperial College London; University of California, Santa Barbara
- Occupations: Engineer; Academics; Educational administrator
- Years active: 1984–present
- Known for: Chemical Engineering
- Parent: Sam Aluko (father)
- Relatives: Gbenga Aluko (brother)

Mobolaji Ebenezer Aluko (born 2 April 1955) is a former Professor of Chemical Engineering at Howard University, and is now "Commissioner for Infrastructure & Public Utilities," in Ekiti state, Nigeria.

He was appointed as the inaugural vice-chancellor of Federal University, Otuoke by the Federal Government of Nigeria from 2011 till the expiration of his tenure in 2016.
