= Aladesanmi =

- Gender: Male
- Language: Yoruba

Origin
- Origin: Nigeria
- Meaning: Royalty befits me
- Region of origin: South West, Nigeria

Aládésanmí is a Nigerian surname. It is a male name and of Yoruba origin, which means "Royalty befits me.". The diminutive forms include Aládésan and/or Sanmí for short.

== Notable people ==
- Ajimudaoro Aladesanmi I, Yoruba monarch
- Adewale Aladesanmi (born 1938), Nigerian businessman and Yoruba prince
- Daniel Aladesanmi II (born 1902), Yoruba Monarch
- Kevin Aladesanmi (born 1998), Swedish-Colombian footballer
- Rufus Aladesanmi III, (born 1945), Yoruba monarch
