= Smaranda =

Smaranda is a Romanian female given name that may refer to:

- Smaranda Brăescu (1897–1948), Romanian parachuting and aviation pioneer
- Smaranda Enache (born 1950), Romanian politician
- Smaranda Gheorghiu (1857–1944), Romanian poet, novelist, essayist, playwright, educator, feminist, and traveler
- Smaranda Olarinde, Nigerian professor of law
