= Oluwasina Ogungbade =

Nigerian lawyer and politician

Hon. Oluwasina Ogungbade

Attorney General and Commissioner for Justice of Ogun State
- Incumbent
- Assumed office November 2021
- Governor: Dapo Abiodun
- Preceded by: Gbolahan Adeniran

Personal details
- Born: Lagos State, Nigeria
- Education: Obafemi Awolowo University
- Occupation: Lawyer, politician

Oluwasina Ogungbade is a Nigerian lawyer and politician. He has practised law for over two decades and, since November 2021, has served as Attorney General and Commissioner for Justice in Ogun State.

== Early life and education ==
Ogungbade was born in Lagos State and grew up in Mushin and Apapa. He attended Ladi‑Lak Primary School, Randle Road, Apapa, for his primary education and later studied at Abeokuta Grammar School, Ogun State, for his secondary education. He earned a law degree from Obafemi Awolowo University (OAU), Ile‑Ife, Osun State. After completing his degree, he attended the Nigerian Law School in 1999 and was called to the Bar in January 2001.

== Career ==
=== Professional career ===
Ogungbade began his legal career at the firm of Ebun‑Olu Adegboruwa & Co, located at Lapal House, Igbosere Road, Lagos. In March 2003, he joined the chambers of Chief G.O.K. Ajayi, SAN. Later that same year, in September 2003, he moved to the firm of Chief Afe Babalola, SAN, where he worked until his appointment as Attorney General in November 2021. During his time at Afe Babalola & Co, he served as Deputy Managing Partner of the firm’s Ibadan office.

Shortly before his appointment, the Legal Practitioners Privileges Committee considered him for elevation to the rank of Senior Advocate of Nigeria (SAN).

=== Political career ===
Following the resignation of Gbolahan Adeniran in November 2021, Ogungbade was nominated and confirmed as Attorney General and Commissioner for Justice of Ogun State.
