= Nigerian Association of Law Teachers =

Organization that represents interests of teachers

The Nigerian Association of Law Teachers, abbreviated as NALT is a professional body which represents the interests of law teachers in Nigeria. It was established in 1961 to promote excellence in research and legal academic teaching in Nigeria. It aids in promoting government policies and practices related to legal education and research. The association also helps in Legal research, Law reform, curriculum advancement of pedagogical improvements in view of national and international developments. The incumbent president of the association is professor Smaranda Olarinde, the Provost of the College of Law, Afe Babalola University.
