= Olasunkanmi Owoyemi =

Nigerian businessman

Olasunkanmi Owoyemi is a Nigerian agribusiness executive, commodities trader, and entrepreneur. He is the founder and managing director of Sunbeth Global Concepts Limited, a Nigerian agricultural export company involved in cocoa, cashew, soybean, and sesame commodity trading.

Owoyemi is known for his role in Nigeria’s cocoa export industry and for expanding intra-African agricultural trade through cocoa sourcing and processing investments.

== Early life and education ==
Owoyemi studied International Relations and Affairs at Afe Babalola University.

He later obtained degrees in Business Administration and United Nations and Diplomatic Studies from the University of Buckingham.

== Career ==
Owoyemi founded Sunbeth Global Concepts in 2017 after securing financing to establish an agricultural export business focused on cocoa and other commodities.

Under his leadership, the company expanded from small-scale cocoa trading into one of Nigeria’s largest indigenous cocoa exporters.

The company reportedly exports tens of thousands of metric tonnes of cocoa annually and has been identified as one of Nigeria’s leading non-oil export businesses.

In 2026, he announced plans for Sunbeth Global Concepts to establish a 70,000-metric-tonne cocoa processing plant and an 80,000-metric-tonne cashew processing facility in Nigeria.

== Agricultural Career ==
Owoyemi has been featured in Nigerian and international business publications for his work in agricultural exports and commodity trading.

French-language publication Jeune Afrique profiled him as a rising figure in Nigeria’s cocoa export industry.

In 2025, Sunbeth Global Concepts became one of the first Nigerian companies in decades licensed to source premium cocoa directly from Ghana through the Ghana Cocoa Marketing Company.
