= Adewale Aladesanmi =

Yoruba prince

- Omoba of Ado-Ekiti
- Born: Abejide Adewale Aladesanmi; 4 August 1938; Nigeria
- Died: 21 January 2017 (aged 78); Ado Ekiti, Ekiti State; Nigeria
- Issue: Princess Adedoyin Aladesanmi
- House: Aladesanmi
- Father: Oba Daniel Aladesanmi II
- Mother: Oloori Awawu Omosuwaola

Prince Abejide Adewale Aladesanmi (4 August 1938 – 21 January 2017) was a Nigerian banker, businessman, and Yoruba prince of the Ekiti people.

== Early life ==
Aladesanmi was born on 4 August 1938 in Nigeria. His father was Oba Daniel Aladesanmi II, the ruler of Ado Ekiti from 1937 until 1983, and his mother was Oloori Awawu Omosuwaola. His paternal grandfather was Oba Ajimudaoro Aladesanmi I.

== Education and career ==
He was educated at Osuntokun School and Christ School in Ado Ekiti. He went to the United Kingdom for his college education, studying accounting and banking at the University of Newcastle upon Tyne. He returned to Nigeria in 1967 after obtaining a combined honours degree in banking and accounting where he worked as an assistant general manager of credit and operation at the National Bank of Nigeria. Prior to his work at the National Bank he had worked at Lloyds Bank and Barclays in London. He retired from banking in 1989 and was appointed by the Nigerian Federal government to serve as a member of the Governing Council of the Federal Polytechnic and as the director of the Nigerian National Patroleum Corporation.

== Death ==
Aladesanmi died on 21 January 2017.
