= Kashifu Abdullahi =

Nigerian computer scientist

Kashifu Inuwa Abdullahi
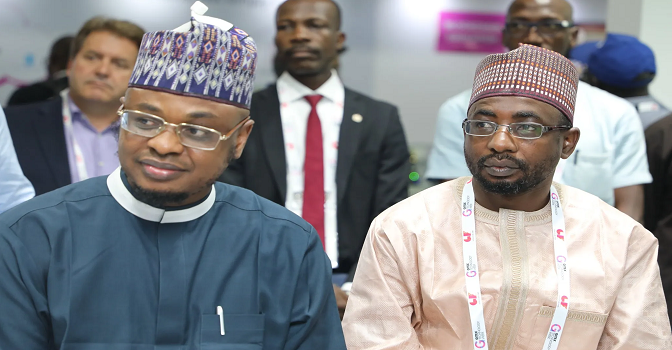
- Born: 21 February, 1980
- Citizenship: Nigeria
- Education: Abubakar Tafawa Balewa University(Ba.Comp.Science)
- Alma mater: Abubakar Tafawa Balewa University, Sloan School of Management, IMD Business School, University of Cambridge
- Occupations: computer scientist, network engineer and technology architect
- Years active: 2006 - present
- Employer: National Information Technology Development Agency
- Known for: Network engineering
- Notable work: Cisco Certified Internetwork Expert (CCIE)
- Predecessor: Isa Pantami

Kashifu Inuwa Abdullahi (born 21 February 1980) is a Nigerian computer scientist, network engineer and technology architect who has served as the director general and chief executive officer of the National Information Technology Development Agency (NITDA) since 2019. He previously held technical and architectural roles at Galaxy Backbone Limited and at the Central Bank of Nigeria.

== Early life and education ==
Abdullahi was born in Hadejia, Jigawa State, Nigeria. He attended Hudu Primary School before completing his secondary education at SSS Kafin Hausa. He studied at Abubakar Tafawa Balewa University, Bauchi, Nigeria, graduating with a bachelor's degree in computer science. He holds several executive certifications in networking, innovation, solutions design and leadership from Oxford University, Harvard University and University of Cambridge. He is an alumnus of Sloan School of Management, IMD Business School, Switzerland and Massachusetts Institute of Technology (MIT).

== Career ==
Abdullahi began his career in 2006 as a network engineer at Galaxy Backbone Ltd – a Nigerian federal agency tasked with unifying Information and Communication Technology (ICT) infrastructure of Ministries, Departments and Agencies (MDAs) of the Federal Government of Nigeria. He was one of the first Cisco Certified Internetwork Expert (CCIE) in the Nigeria public sector. Abdullahi left Galaxy Backbone in 2014 and joined the Central Bank of Nigeria (CBN).

At the CBN he served as a technology architect and was part of a team that implemented a software license rationalization framework at the CBN, which reportedly reduced duplication and contributed to significant cost savings, including reductions in redundant software and associated costs. He served at the CBN until 2017 when he was appointed as technical assistant to the then director general of National Information Technology Development Agency,replacing Isa Pantami.

Director general of NITDA

On 20 August 2019, President Muhammadu Buhari appointed Abdullahi as director general and CEO of NITDA following the appointment of Isa Pantami as minister of Communication and Digital Economy. In 2021, Abdullahi launched the NITDA Strategic Roadmap and Action Plan (SRAP 2021 – 2024) which provided direction for Nigeria's digital economy and created opportunities for Nigerian youths. He introduced IT Project Clearance program which cleared 575 special IT Projects across 267 MDAs with a total sum of 1.4 trillion naira and helped federal government in saving over 45 billion naira in cost of projects execution. He upgraded the agency's Computer Emergency Response and Readiness Center (CERRC) enhancing its cybersecurity and protection for Federal Public Institutions (FPIs) against cyber-attacks.

In October 2023, President Bola Tinubu reappointed Abdullahi for a second term as DG and CEO of NITDA.

== See also ==
- Oliver Mobisson
- Peter Okebukola
- Unoma Ndili Okorafor
