= Adewale Oke Adekola =

Nigerian engineer, academic, author, and administrator

Adewale Oke Adekola (26 March 1932 – March 1999) was a Nigerian engineer, academic, author, and administrator. He was the first Nigerian dean of engineering and head of civil engineering at the University of Lagos. He was the founding vice chancellor of the Abubakar Tafawa Balewa University Bauchi and emeritus professor of the University of Lagos. He was a pioneer of engineering education in Nigeria and reputed as a great teacher. He became one of the first Nigerians to be awarded the degree of Doctor of Science (DSc) in 1976 - awarded by London University in engineering (structural mechanics).

== Early life ==
Adekola was born in Ota, Ogun State, on 26 March 1932. His father was Chief Gbadamosi Akande Adekola, a goldsmith and farmer of Olupe compound, Ijaiye, Abeokuta. His mother was Alhaja Ayisat Aina Ajile Adekola a successful merchant trader of local fabrics (Aso-Oke / Adire) of Otun quarters, Ota. Adewale was educated at Saint James primary school Ota from 1939 to 1946. Adewale joined the Nigerian Broadcasting Corporation in 1951, where he distinguished himself as an electrical engineering assistant - he left after gaining admission to University College Ibadan.

== Academic achievements ==
Adekola's tertiary education commenced at the University of Ibadan (1952–53) where he sat for and obtained his InterBSc London University. He was then awarded a Western Region Government scholarship to the Northampton Engineering College, London (Now City University) in 1953 and attained his BSc in engineering in 1956. His scholarship was extended on the recommendation of the Colonial Office and Sir Hubert Walker, Director of Public Works. Adekola proceeded to Imperial College of Science and Technology, London in 1956 earning his Diploma of Imperial College (DIC) in 1958 and his Doctorate of Philosophy (PhD) in 1959. Adekola authored several papers on composites systems and in 1976 his contribution to the understanding of the complex relationship between the factors affecting the ultimate strength of composite beams earned him the prestigious higher doctorate degree, DSc of the University of London.

== Educator and administrator ==
After his PhD, Adekola worked briefly with the international firm of Ove Arup & Partners from 1959 to 1960.

=== Ahmadu Bello University, Zaria ===
He commenced his teaching career with the Nigerian College of Arts, Science & Technology, Zaria, 1960 as lecturer rising to senior lecturer and acting head of department by 1962. Civil unrest caused by the buildup to the Nigerian Civil War caused him to move to the University of Lagos as associate professor and acting dean of engineering in 1965.

=== University of Lagos ===
Adekola was invited to oversee the establishment of the University of Lagos faculty of Engineering and produced the first set of graduates in the field of Engineering in June 1967. Adekola became Professor (Civil Engineering) in 1968 as well as the first Nigerian Dean of the Faculty of Engineering. His inaugural paper presented several innovative solutions to infrastructure development in Nigeria and is considered to have laid seeds for the pioneering of laterite as a road construction material for developing nations. In addition, he suggested a more resilient road construction methodology with a better capacity to sustain heavy traffic loads, leading to lower maintenance cost. He remains the longest serving Dean of the Faculty of Engineering at the University of Lagos (1968 – 1971) and upon vacating his Deanship was appointed Head of Civil Engineering Department of the same Institution. In his tenure at the University of Lagos he served on the Committee of Deans (65 – 71), Development Committee (67 – 70), Library Committee (67 – 70), Academic Planning Committee (72 – 74), University Council (75 – 79) and as Chairman of the Computer Management Board (73 – 76).

=== Abubakar Tafawa Balewa University, Bauchi ===
In 1980 Adekola was appointed the pioneering Vice Chancellor of the Federal University of Technology (Abubakar Tafawa Balewa University), Bauchi where he was charged with creating and developing a greenfield technology institution. In quick order he negotiated and acquired the existing Bauchi College of Arts and Science, acquired lands for a permanent site for future development and recruited local and foreign staff in the field of Science, Engineering, Computer Science and Agriculture. Adekola aggressively drove plans; commissioning surveys, and creating the master plan for the development of a forward looking institution. By 1984 when Adekola's tenure ended as Vice Chancellor, he had commissioned several key infrastructure and buildings, equipped the Science, Engineering and Computing laboratories and formed collaborative ventures with Loughborough University of Technology (UK) in the field of Industrial Training and Manufacturing and University of Arizona (USA) in the field of Arid Zone Agriculture. After his service to the nation at Bauchi, Adekola returned to teaching at the University of Lagos and retired as emeritus professor of Engineering in 1988. Adekola also authored several books and papers in his specialized area of structural integrity which now serve as reference texts. He was also one of the founders of the Nigerian Academy of Engineering

=== Federal Polytechnic Ado Ekiti / Federal Polytechnic Biba ===
Adekola went on to serve as Chairman of Council at the Federal Polytechnic Ado Ekiti and the Chairman of Council at the Federal Polytechnic Bida – where he served until his demise.

He was awarded National honour of the Commander of the Order of the Niger (CON) for his services to Nigeria in 1998.

In his retirement Adekola authored two books on structural mechanics namely Mechanics of Statistically Indeterminate Structures and Elementary Structural Mechanics the later as a text book for student use.

== Public service ==
Adekola served on several committees to help build education in Nigeria in general and the engineering discipline in particular.

- Unesco National Commission for Nigeria 1964 -65
- Director Nigerian Petroleum Refining Company, Port Harcourt 1965 -70
- West African Examination Council 1965 -70
- Committee on Technical Education in Middle Africa 1967 -70
- Council of Registered Engineers 1971 -74
- Inter Africa Panel of Scientists 1972 – 75
- Chairman of Senate Abubakar Tafawa Balewa University 1980 – 84
- Committee of Vice Chancellors 1980 -84
- Chairman of Council Federal Polytechnic Bida 1987 - 90.
- Chairman of Council Federal Polytechnic Ado-Ekiti 1990 -94
- He played a credible role in the founding of Nigerian Academy of Engineering.

== Honours, distinctions, and awards ==
- Citation by the Faculty of Engineering University of Lagos: In recognition of his distinguished scholarship in the field of engineering; outstanding service as a former Dean of Engineering; and for his contribution towards the development and progress of the Faculty of Engineering at the University of Lagos. July 1984.
- Concord Press Award for Academic publishing in recognition of his book titled “Mechanics of Statically Indeterminate Structures” 1990
- Award of Gold Medal by the University of Lagos – 1991
- Award of D.Sc (Honoris Causa) Abubakar Tafawa Balewa University Bauchi – 1994
- Award of Emeritus Professor by the University of Lagos - 1996
- National Award of Commander of the Order of the Niger by the Federal Republic of Nigeria – 1998

== Death ==
Adekola died on 3 March 1999, at the age of 67. He was laid to rest at Ikoyi Cemetery, Lagos. He was survived by his wife, Mrs Adenrele Henrietta Adekola and children.
