= National Information Technology Development Agency =

Nigerian Agency

Agency overview
- Formed: 18 April 2001
- Jurisdiction: Government of Nigeria
- Headquarters: Abuja, FCT, Nigeria.
- Minister responsible: Minister of Communications, Innovations, and Digital Economy, Dr. Bosun Tijani
- Agency executives: Director General/CEO, Inuwa Kashifu Abdullahi; Director Corporate Planning & Strategy, Dr. Dimie Shively Warowei; Director Cyber Security, Dr. Lawan Mohammed; Director IT Infrastructure Solutions, Mr. Oladejo Olawumi; Head Corporate Affairs & External Relation, Hadiza Umar (Mrs)
- Website: nitda.gov.ng

The National Information Technology Development Agency (NITDA) is a public service institution established by the NITDA Act 2007 as the ICT policy implementing arm of the Federal Ministry of Communications, Innovation and Digital Economy of the Federal Republic of Nigeria. It is responsible for developing programmes that cater for the running of ICT-related activities in the country. NITDA is also mandated with the implementation of policy guidelines for driving ICT in Nigeria. It plays an advisory role in copyright law by verification and revision of applicable laws in tandem with the application of software and technology acquisition. The majority of these activities are achieved through organisation of workshops, which cater for the training needs of its staff, government functionaries and education sectors.

== Programmes and initiatives ==
In November 2023, national media reported an ICT training programme for female founders in Abuja and an event recognising top learners in a NITDA–Coursera initiative. In January 2023, THISDAY covered calls to align the National Digital Literacy Framework with international standards. In 2025, Vanguard reported an agriculture digitisation pilot involving NITDA, JICA, and Agrovesto, and separate efforts to expand adoption of the .ng country-code domain.

In November 2023, The Guardian (Nigeria) reported that the agency presented laptops to top learners in its NITDA–Coursera programme; the presentation was made by the acting director of the Digital Literacy and Capacity Building Department, Amina Sambo-Magaji, on behalf of the director-general. The Massachusetts Institute of Technology lists Amina Sambo-Magaji as the Acting Director for Digital Literacy and Skills (NITDA) on the Abuja team of its Regional Entrepreneurship Acceleration Program (REAP). In February 2018, The Guardian reported a NITDA stakeholders' meeting on patronage of indigenous software, identifying Amina Sambo-Magaji as National Coordinator of the agency's Office for ICT Innovation and Entrepreneurship (OIIE).

== History ==
ICT related activities started in 1950. NITDA was commissioned by the administration of President Olusegun Obasanjo through the perfection of a bill designed to provide for the establishment of National Information Technology Development in 2007 (The NITDA Act). Operations of NITDA started in 2001, six years before the bill was passed into law. The agency's main objective is to provide ICT as a tool in tertiary institutions to drive the mechanisms of the education sector in the country. Its creation has caused the establishment of state ICT agencies in other states of the Federation, such as the Plateau State Information And Communication Technology Development Agency. The agency started its operations in Abuja, FCT, with 30 computers. These devices were used for the training of major government functionaries which include the president and his ministers. Within the first three years of establishment, the agency supplied 5,700 computers system to over 187 educational institutions in the country including: universities, secondary schools and primary schools.

The National Information Technology Development Agency (NITDA) is known for the introduction of professional training programmes across various states in Nigeria. In 2020, NITDA announced it would train 75,000 youths in Kaduna state in information technology. In 2022, they organised a programme called the "Digital Economy Employability Programme", which is aimed at training over 200,000 Nigerians from all over the country.
