= Smaranda Olarinde =

Nigerian lawyer

- Born: Romania
- Occupations: Law professor; teacher; researcher; legal practitioner
- Years active: 2015–present
- Children: Daddy Freeze

Smaranda Olarinde is a Romanian-born Nigerian law professor, president of the Nigerian Association of Law Teachers, and incumbent vice-chancellor at Afe Babalola University. She worked as a legal researcher at the UNICEF offices in Oyo State and Niger State in 1995.

== Career ==
Olarinde has over three decades of cumulative experience as a law teacher, academic, researcher and legal practitioner. She has a legal background in civil and common law. Olarinde's focus has been on the rights and protection of women, children and young adolescents. In 1989, she was a legal researcher for IDRC on land tenure and access to land for women. She also served as a legal researcher for the World Bank on law development and the status of women (1990) and towards a gender strategy in Nigeria (1992).

She was a member of the “think tank” for the legal protection of children in Oyo State and coordinator of the International Federation of Women Lawyers (FIDA).

Olarinde carried out several multidisciplinary researches on reproductive rights, women and children's rights, HIV/AIDS and participated in the collaborative effort between researchers from Israel, the Netherlands and Nigeria.

She is actively involved in training law students at the undergraduate and postgraduate levels, as well as law clinicians for participation in community services involving pro bono legal advice.

== Personal life ==
Olarinde is the mother of Daddy Freeze.

== See also ==
- Afe Babalola
