= Daniel Aladesanmi II =

King of Ado Ekiti

Ewi of Ado Ekiti
- Reign: 18 June 1937 – 7 January 1983
- Predecessor: Adewumi Agunsoye
- Successor: Samuel Adeyemi George-Adelabu I
- Born: Daniel Akomolafe Anirare Aladesanmi; 1902; Nigeria
- Died: January 7, 1983 (aged 80–81); Ado Ekiti, Ekiti State; Nigeria
- Spouse: Queen Awawu Omosuwaola
- Issue: Prince Adewale Aladesanmi
- House: Aladesanmi
- Father: Ajimudaoro Aladesanmi I
- Mother: Olori Ifalete

Daniel Akomolafe Anirare Aladesanmi II OBE CFR (1902 – 7 January 1983) was a Yoruba Oba who reigned as Ewi of Ado Ekiti in Nigeria from 1937 until 1983.

== Early life ==
Aladesanmi was born in 1902 to Olori Ifalete and Oba Ajimudaoro Aladesanmi I, who had reigned as Ewi of Ado Ekiti between 1892 and 1910. He was an Ekiti, a subgroup of the Yoruba people. He attended Saint Andrews College in Oyo from 1924 until 1928. While at Saint Andrews he was school prefect and president of the Ekiti Parapo Society. He worked as a higher grade officer for the railway in 1933.

== Reign ==
Aladesanmi ascended the throne, becoming Ewi of Ado Ekiti, on 18 June 1937. Ado Ekiti is an ancient city in Southwestern Nigeria and the seat of the Ekiti State.

In 1940 residents of Ado Ekiti protested Aladesanmi's reign, but the colonial government refused to remove him. The following year he set up an advisory board to supervise developmental projects in Ado Ekiti regarding construction, transportation, and city planning. He was appointed as President of Pelupelu in 1938. In January 1950 he established a weaving center in Ado Ekiti for children "to use their hands and brains". He was involved in the Constitutional Independence Conferences of 1948 and 1959 in London and was a member of the Yoruba Council of Obas.

Aladesanmi was appointed Deputy President of the Western House of Chiefs on September 28, 1960 and was a member of the Commonwealth Parliamentary Association. He was also a Bencher of the Western House of Chiefs in the 1960s.

In 1977 he published his memoir titled My Early Life: An Autobiography.

During his reign Aladesanmi traced the history of migrant settlers in the Ekiti kingdom since the twelfth century and their connection to the Ilesun people. He was appointed as an Officer of the Order of the British Empire by Elizabeth II at the 1962 New Year Honours. In 1978 he was the first to be decorated with the national honour of Commander of the Order of the Federal Republic by Olusegun Obasanjo. He was also appointed Chancellor of the University of Maiduguri in December 1979, holding the office until his death.

== Death ==
Aladesanmi died on January 7, 1983. He reigned as Ewi of Ado Ekiti until his death.
