= Abubakar Tafawa Balewa University =

Public university in Bauchi, Nigeria

Coordinates: 10.3297704°N 9.8453553°E

- Other names: ATBU "Makera" A place where students are being taught and well trained
- Motto: "Doctrina mater artium" (Education is the mother of all practical arts)
- Type: Public
- Established: 1980
- Affiliations: Association of African Universities, National Universities Commission
- Chancellor: Rufus Adeyemo Adejugbe Aladesanmi III (Ewi of Ado-Ekiti)
- Vice-Chancellor: Professor Ibrahim Hassan Garba
- Administrative staff: 1000
- Undergraduates: 10,000
- Postgraduates: 200
- Location: Bauchi, Bauchi State, Nigeria
- Campus: Urban
- Website: http://www.atbu.edu.ng/

Abubakar Tafawa Balewa University (ATBU) is a federal university of technology located in Bauchi, north eastern part of Nigeria. The university is named after Nigeria's first and only prime minister, Sir Abubakar Tafawa Balewa. The motto of the university is "Doctrina Mater Artium", which means "Education is the mother of the practical arts".

ATBU was established in 1980 as the Federal University of Technology, Bauchi. The institution's first students were admitted in October 1981 for pre-degree and remedial programmes while the degree courses of the School of Science and Science Education began in October 1982. On 1 October 1984, the university was merged with Ahmadu Bello University, Zaria, Nigeria, with a change of name to Abubakar Tafawa Balewa College, Ahmadu Bello University, Bauchi campus. The university regained its autonomous status in 1988 following a general demerger of such institutions. This was followed by a change of name to Abubakar Tafawa Balewa University, Bauchi.

The academic pattern of the university was formulated in 1980 after consultation with subject experts from Nigeria, United Kingdom and United States of America. The curriculum adopted was applied in nature, as suited a technologically based institution, and this theme was maintained in all the units of the university.

The university offers degrees through seven schools: the School of Engineering, Science, Environmental Technology, Agriculture, Management Technology, the School of Technology Education and College of Medical Sciences. It offers entry level bachelor's degrees and both master's and doctorate degrees. Each school is headed by a dean/provost who reports directly to the vice chancellor. The vice chancellor is the executive head of the university. S/he is appointed by the Federal Ministry of Education on recommendation by the governing council of the university.

== University library ==
The university library was established in 1981 to support teaching, learning and research processes with over 1000 seating capacity, 161,672 volumes of books, 3442 journal titles and serial titles of 2117. The virtual library has more than 50 computers that are Internet networked with KOHA as its software use for day-to-day operation. the university library purchase and subscribe databases for free access to HINARI, AGTORA and ESBCOHOST etc.

== Administration ==
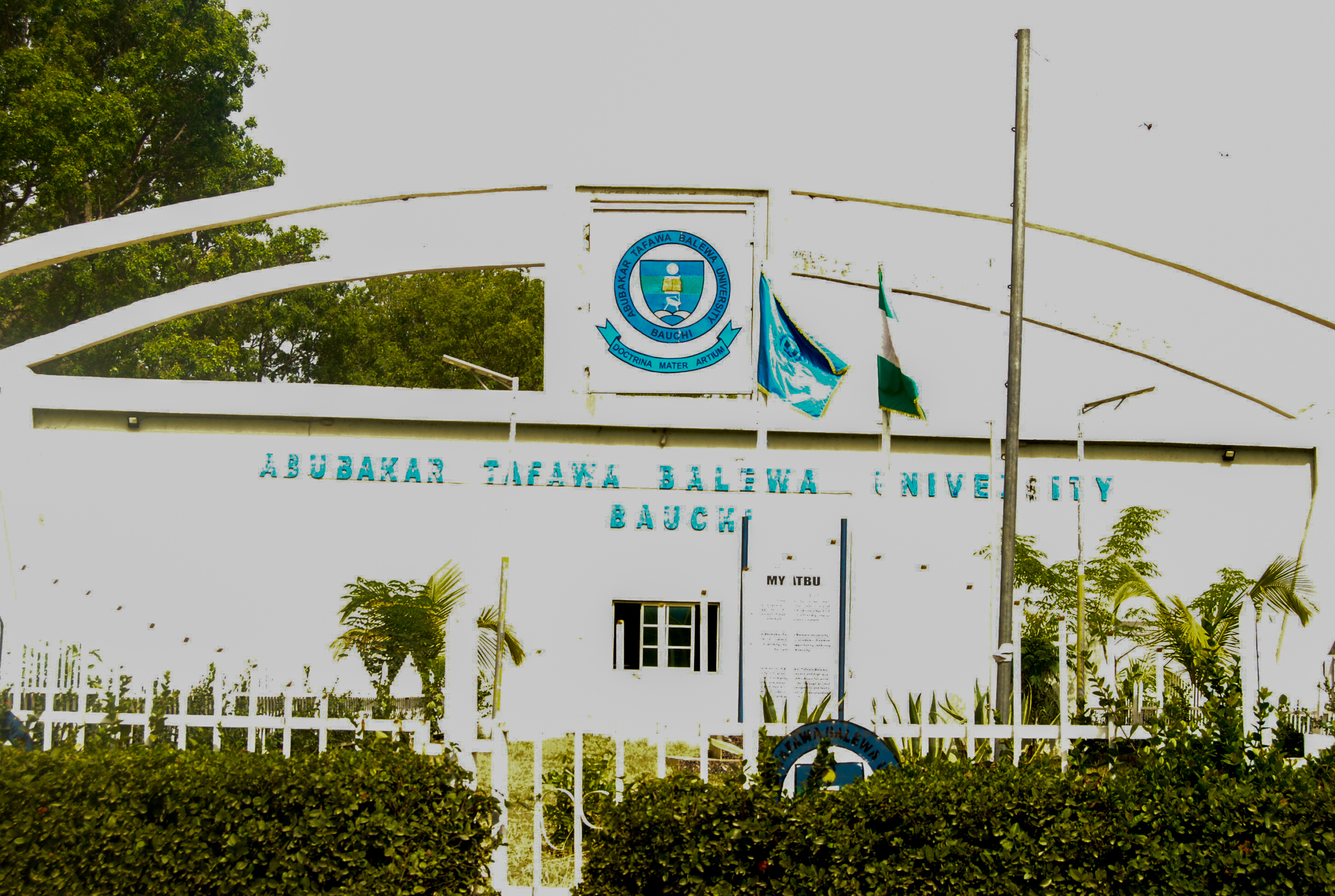
Abubakar Tafawa Balewa University Bauchi Entry Gate

Abubakar Tafawa Balewa University has a chancellor as the ceremonial head of the university, while the vice-chancellor is the chief executive and academic officer of the university. The vice-chancellor is usually appointed for a five-year, non-renewable term. The 8th vice-chancellor from 2019 to 2024 is Professor Professor Ibrahim Hassan Garba

Since inception the university has been managed by the following chief executives:

S/N	Name	Tenure	Office held
1	Professor Adewale Oke Adekola	1980–1984	Vice-chancellor
2	Professor Buba Garegy Bajoga	1984–1988	Provost
3	Professor Buba Garegy Bajoga	1988–1995	Vice-chancellor
4	Professor Abubakar Sani Sambo	1995–2004	Vice-chancellor
5	Professor Garba Aliyu Babaji	2004–2009	Vice-chancellor
6	Professor Muhammad Hamisu Muhammad	2009–2014	Vice-chancellor
7	Professor Abdulrahman Saminu Ibrahim	2014–2019	Vice-chancellor
8	Professor Muhammad A. AbdulAzeez	2019–2024	Vice-chancellor
9	Professor Ibrahim Hassan Garba	2024-Date	Vice Chancellor

Currently, the university has over 30 academic departments, 6 faculties, 8 directorates and 7 centers, with an undergraduate students' population of over 10,000. A college of medical science has been established in the university and has since taken off.

== Faculties ==
The University Has the following Faculties:

=== Faculty of Agriculture & Agricultural Technology ===
S/N	Name
1	Department of Animal Production
2	Department of Crop Production
3	Department of Soil Science
4	Department of Agricultural Economics and Extension

=== Faculty of Engineering & Engineering Technology ===
S/N	Name
1	Department of Agriculture and Bio-Resource Engineering
2	Department of Automobile Engineering
3	Department of Chemical Engineering
4	Department of Civil Engineering
5	Department of Computer and Communication Engineering
6	Department of Electrical/Electronic Engineering
7	Department of Mechanical/Production Engineering
8	Department of Mechatronics and Systems Engineering
9	Department of Petroleum and natural gas engineering

=== Faculty of Environmental Technology ===
S/N	Name
1	Department of Architectures
2	Department of Building
3	Department of Environmental Management Technology
4	Department of Estate Management and Valuation
5	Department of Industrial Design
6	Department of Survey & Geo-Informatics
7	Department of Quantity Survey
8	Department of Urban & Regional Planning

=== Faculty of Management Technology ===
S/N	Name
1	Department Banking & Finance Technology
2	Department of Management & Information Technology
3	General Studies
4	Department of Accounting
5	Department of Technopreneurship
6	Department of Business Management

=== Faculty of Technology Education ===
S/N	Name
1	Department of Education Foundation
2	Department of Science Education
3	Department of Vocational & Technology Education
4	Department of Library and information science

=== Faculty of Science ===
S/N	Name
1	Department of Mathematical Sciences
2	Department of Biological Sciences
3	Department of Chemistry
4	Department of Geology
5	Department of Physics
6	Department of Biochemistry
7	Department of Ecology
8	Department of Biochemistry
9	Department of Microbiology

=== College of Medicine ===
The university has a college of medical Sciences that offers medical and health related courses. Also, it has a college hospital Abubakar Tafawa Balewa University Bauchi Teaching Hospital where medical attentions are being attended to.

== Academic support units ==
There are two directorates that provides academic support services to the university. These are:

1. Directorate of Basic and Remedial Studies

2. General Studies Directorate

== School of Postgraduate Studies ==
The School of Postgraduate Studies of ATBU is saddled with the following responsibility:

- Coordinating all the postgraduate programme of studies in the university, such as postgraduate planning, admission, registration and examination.
- Maintenance of postgraduate academic standards, and
- Monitoring and evaluating the progress of postgraduate studies in the university and submission of an annual report to Senate.

== Notable alumni ==
- Isa Ali Pantami – Nigerian Minister of Communications and Digital Economy.
- Inuwa Kashifu Abdullahi – director-general of the National Information Technology Development Agency (NITDA).
- Delmwa Deshi-Kura, fim production executive

Notable faculty alumni

- Saket Kushwaha – former dean of School of Management.

== See also ==
- Abubakar Tafawa Balewa University Library
- List of universities in Nigeria
- Education in Nigeria

== Gallery ==
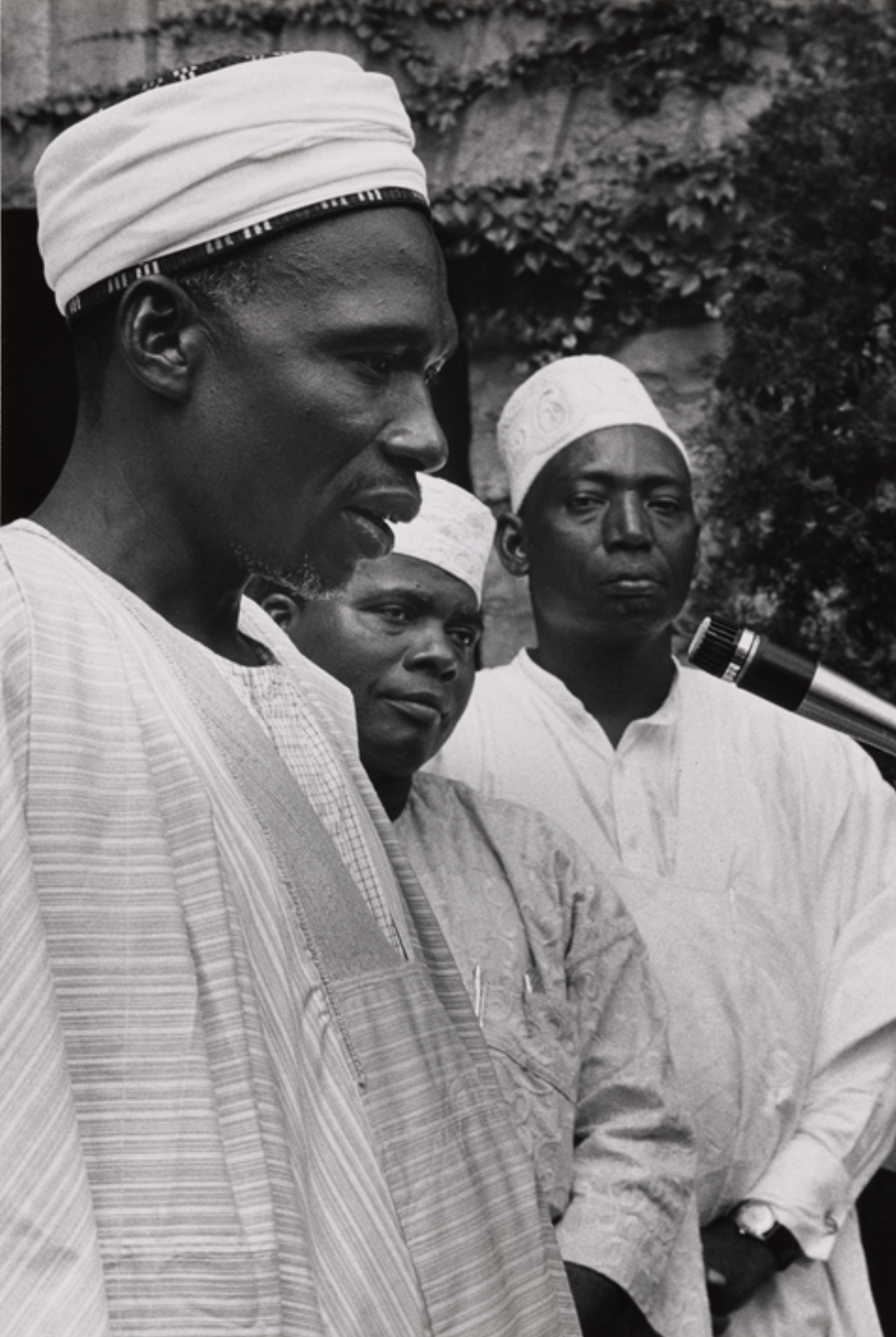

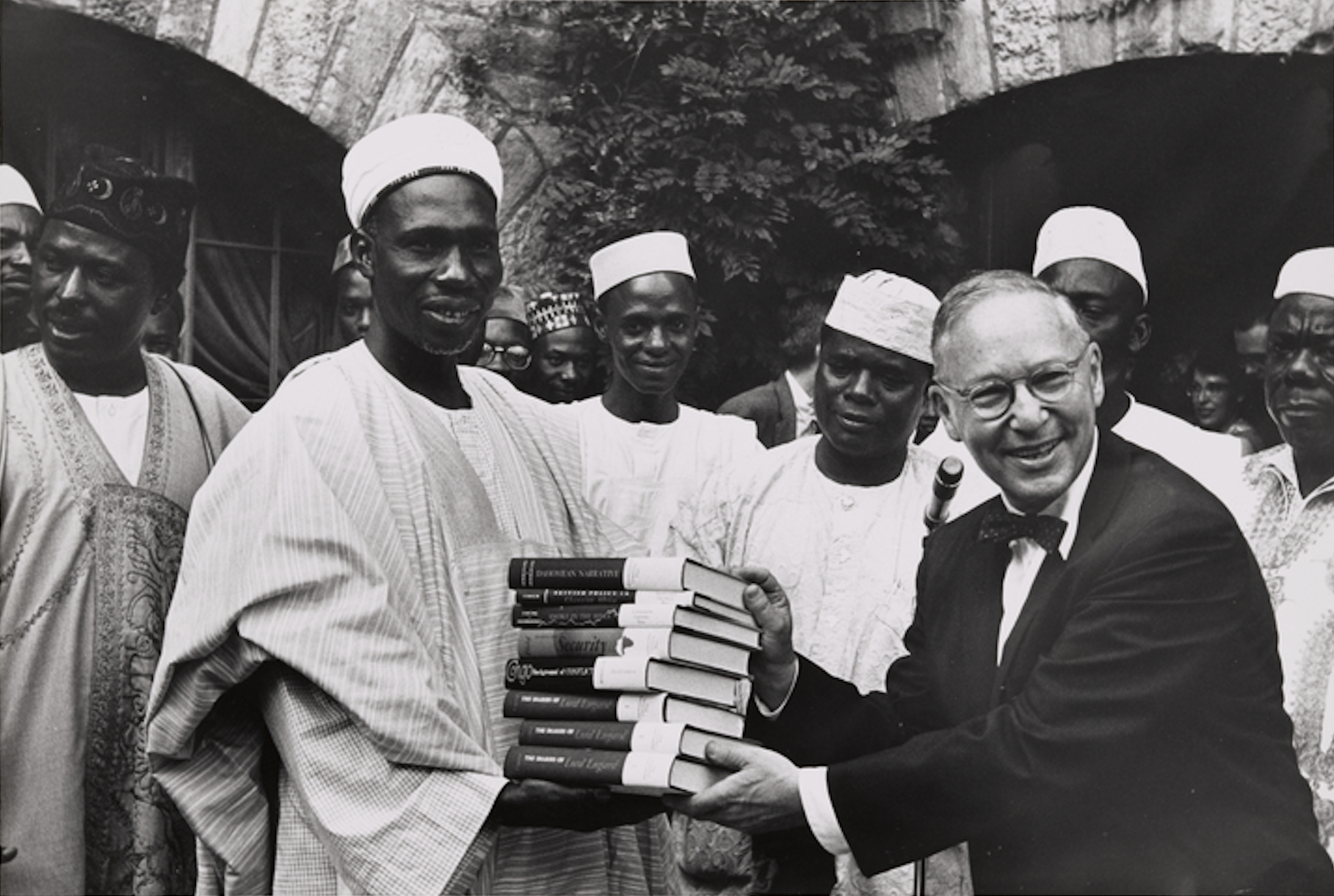

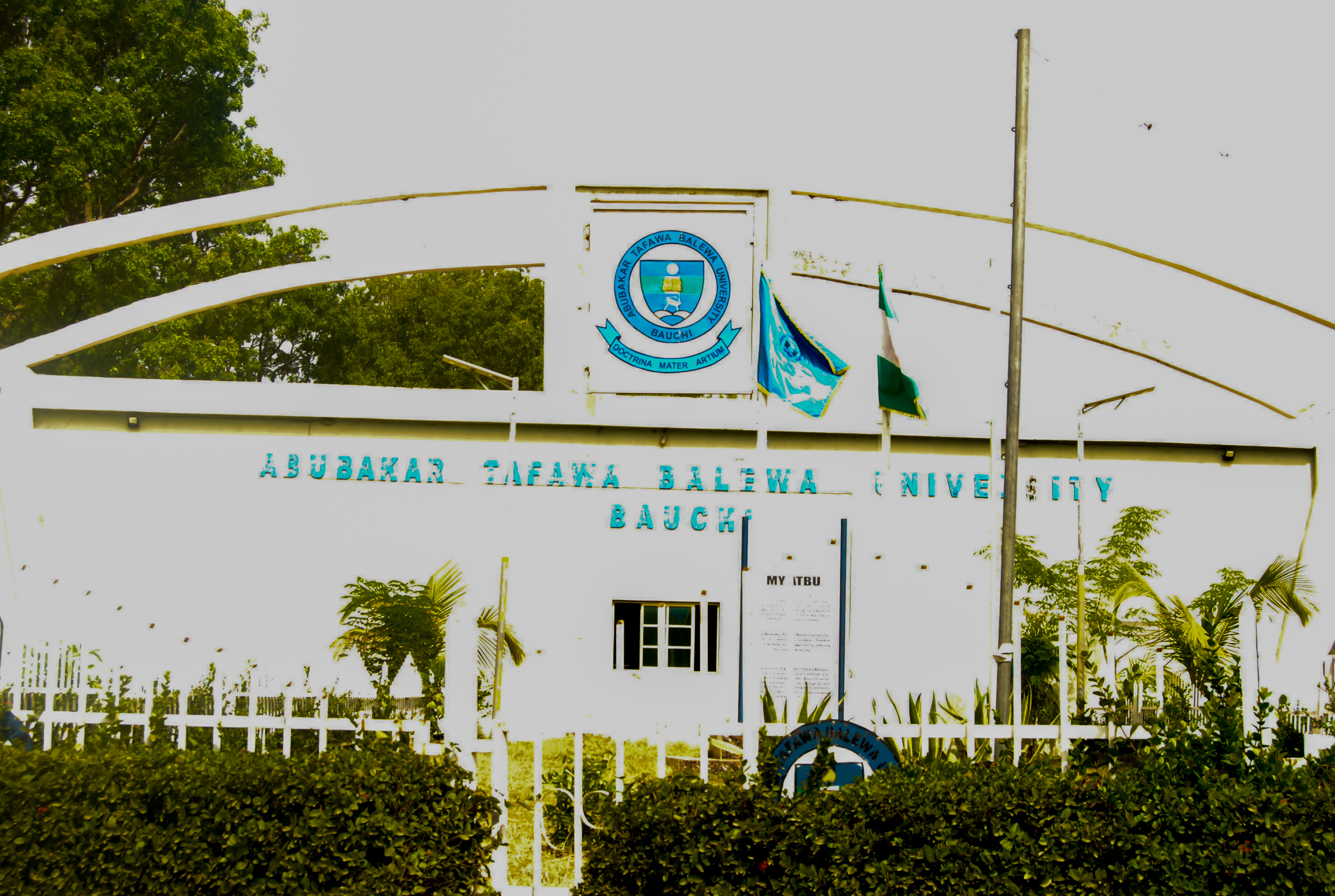

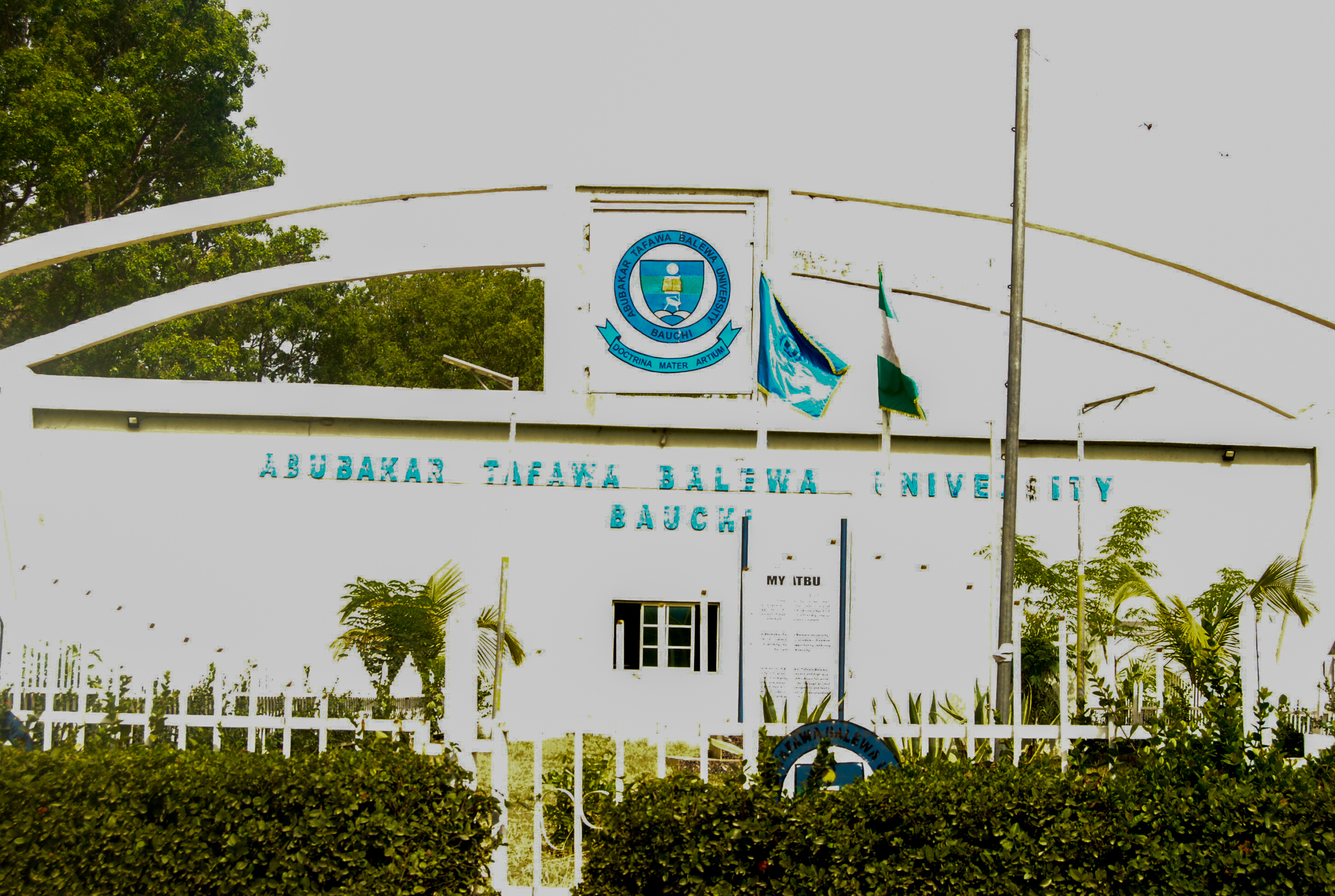

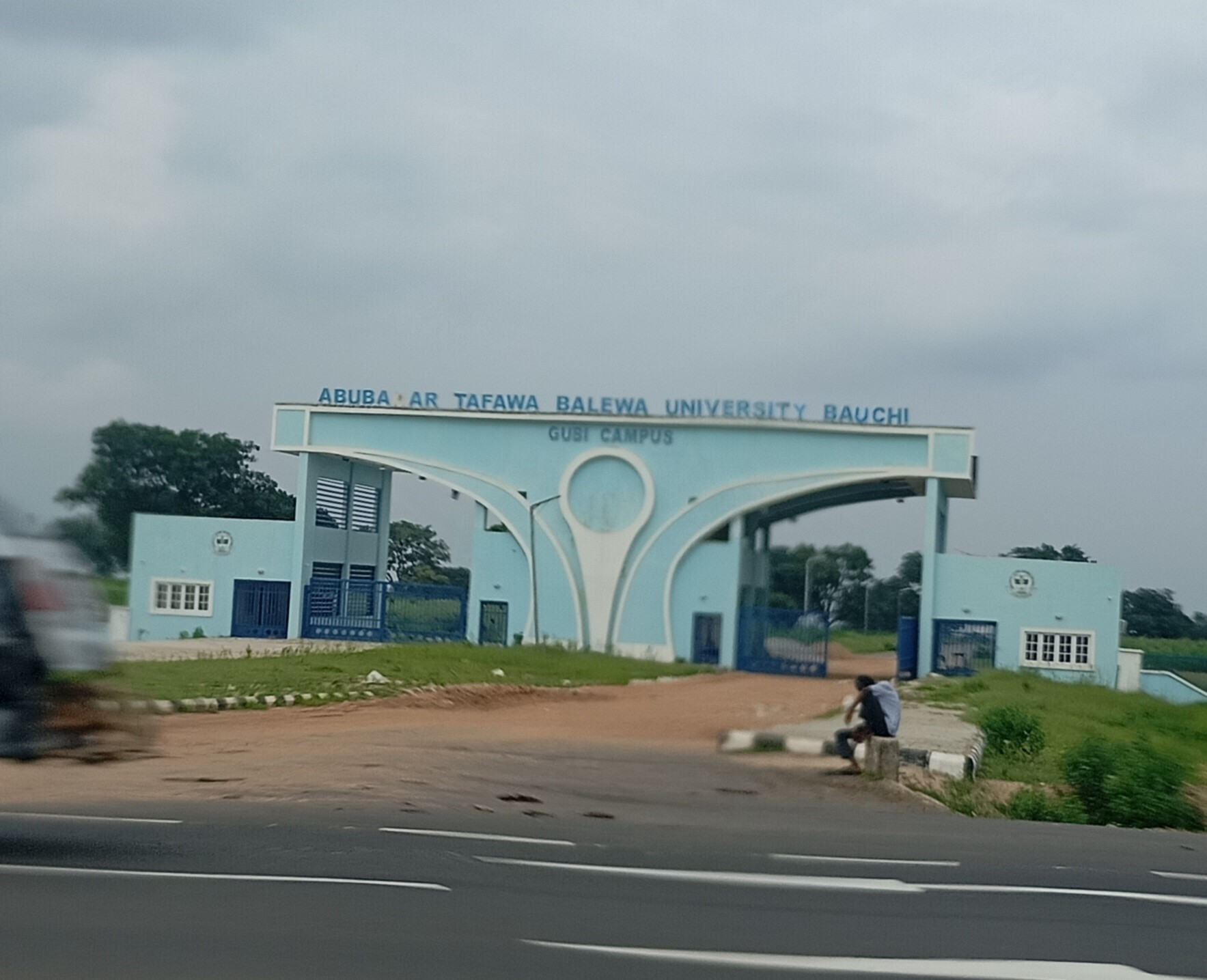

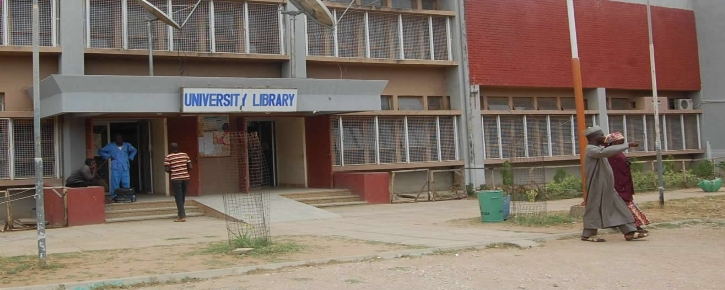

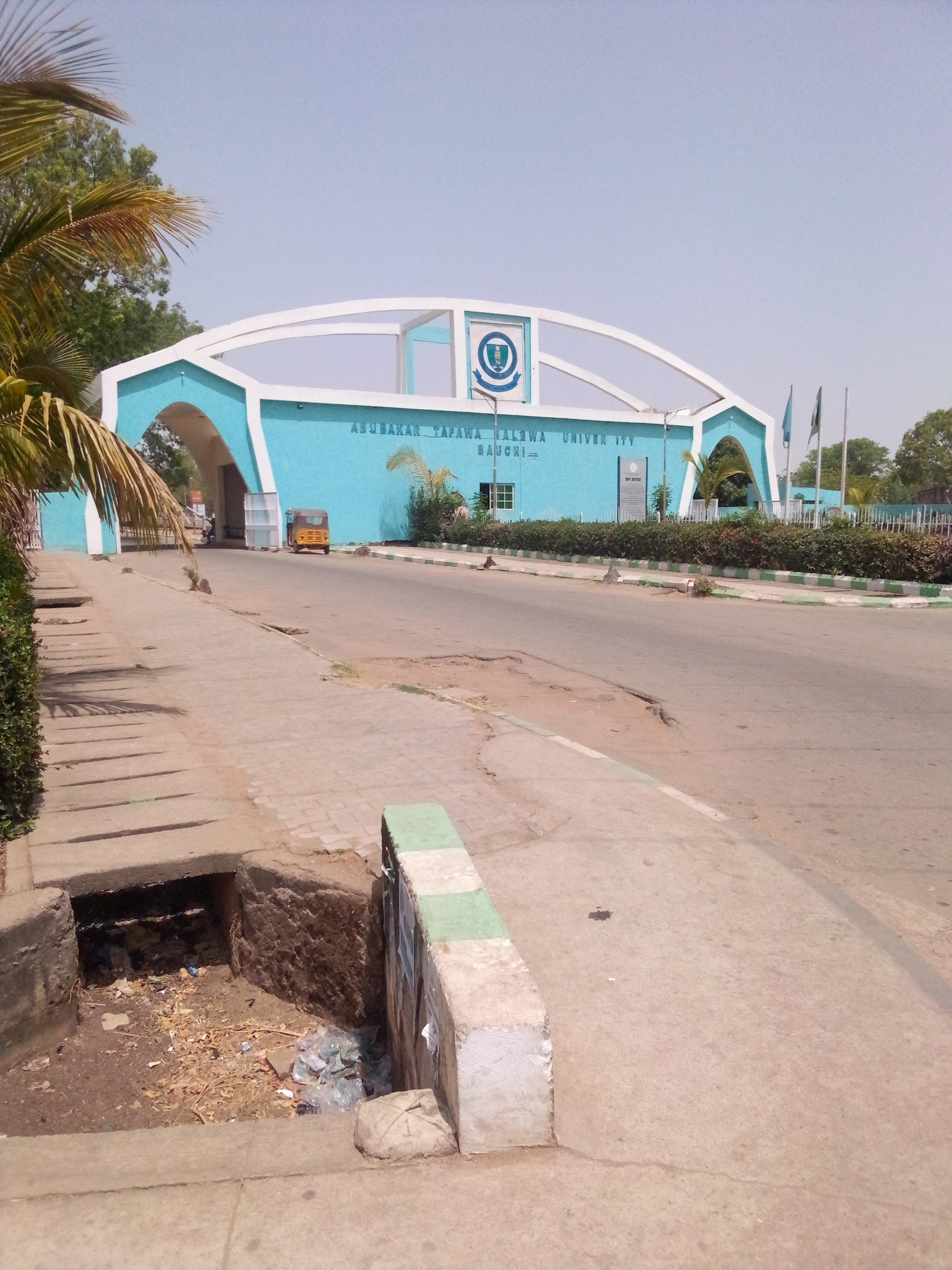
