= Israel Esan Owolabi =

Nigeria engineer and academic

- Born: 27 April 1935 (age 91); Ekiti state
- Citizenship: Nigeria
- Education: Christ school ado ekiti
- Occupation: Lecturer

Israel Esan Owolabi is the provost, College of Engineering, Afe Babalola University

== Background ==
Owolabi was born on 27 April 1935 at Ayegbaju Ekiti, Ekiti State, Nigeria. He had his secondary education at Christ's School Ado Ekiti, (1951–1955), and tertiary education at the Nigerian College of Arts, Science and Technology, Ibadan (1956–1958) for his GCE Advanced Level, University College, Ibadan, (1958–1961) for his B.Sc., (Hons) physics. He received his Ph.D. in physics from Durham University (1961–1964).

== Career ==
He started university teaching career as lecturer at the University of Ife (now Obafemi Awolowo University), Ile-Ife, in the Department of Physics (1964 -1971) and moved to the newly established Department of Electronics, Faculty of Technology, as senior lecturer (1971–1976) and reader (1976–1978) of the same university. He transferred his service to the University of Ilorin as the pioneer professor of electrical engineering in 1978. He became the dean, Faculty of Engineering and Technology (1980–1984) and deputy vice-chancellor (DVC) (1989–1993) and served as the head of the Department of Electrical Engineering in between the posts of dean and DVC.

After retiring voluntarily in 1993, he has served continuously on contract basis as professor of electrical/electronic engineering at the University of Ilorin (1993–2000), Ladoke Akintola University (LAUTECH), Ogbomoso (2001–2005), University of Ado-Ekiti, now Ekiti State University (EKSU) (2005–2010), and currently Afe Babalola University (ABUAD), Ado-Ekiti, 2010 to date. For senior university administrative experience, Owolabi has served on the Governing Councils of the University of Ife as Congregation Representative (1976–1978), University of Ilorin (1980–1984) as Senate Representative and (1989–1993) as DVC. He is currently serving on the Council of ABUAD as Senate Representative. He has been a member of Senate of the universities of Ife, Ilorin, LAUTECH, EKSU and ABUAD continuously from 1976 to date.
