= Rufus Aladesanmi III =

King of Ado Ekiti

Rufus Adeyemo Adejugbe Aladesanmi III

Ewi of Ado Ekiti
- Reign: 1990 – present
- Predecessor: Samuel Adeyemi George-Adelabu I
- Born: Rufus Adeyemo Adejugbe Aladesanmi; 1945; Nigeria
- House: Aladesanmi

Rufus Adeyemo Adejugbe Aladesanmi III CON (born 1945) is a Yoruba Oba and the current Ewi of Ado Ekiti.

== Reign ==
Aladesanmi succeeded Adelabu I as the Ewi of Ado Ekiti in 1990.

He serves as the chancellor of Abubakar Tafawa Balewa University and was formerly the chancellor at the University of Jos.

In 2000 Aladesanmi was made a Commander of the Order of the Niger.

In 2018 Aladesanmi offered aid and support for Ayo Fayose, the Governor of Ekiti, after 400 members of the Government House were detained by police in a period of political turmoil. While laying the foundation of a new hall in Aladesanmi's official palace, Ibrahim Dankwambo, the Governor of Gombe State, also voiced support for Fayose and referred to him as the "symbol" of the People's Democratic Party. Aladesanmi and Fayose both spoke about the importance of peace and the rights of the people of Ado Ekiti in choosing their political leaders.
