= Afe Babalola =

Nigerian lawyer (born 1929)

Afe Babalola CON, OFR, SAN
- Born: 18 October 1930 (age 96); Onitsha, Southern Region, British Nigeria (now in Anambra State, Nigeria)
- Citizenship: Nigeria
- Education: London University
- Occupations: Lawyer; farmer; educationist; educational administrator
- Years active: 1963–2010
- Organization: Afe Babalola University
- Spouse: Modupe Mercy Babalola
- Children: 9, including Bolanle
- Awards: Commander of the Order of the Niger; Officer of the Order of the Federal Republic; Senior Advocate of Nigeria
- Website: www.afebabalola.com

Afe Babalola CON OFR SAN (born 18 October 1929) is a Nigerian lawyer and founder of Afe Babalola University.

== Early life and education ==
Afe Babalola was born in Ado Ekiti in Southern Nigeria (now in Ekiti State). He enrolled for the Senior Cambridge School Certificate examination by private study from Wolsey Hall, Oxford. He later obtained the A’Level certificate of London University before he proceeded to London School of Economics where he received a bachelor's degree in economics.

After working at the Central Bank of Nigeria, he left to the University of London where he obtained a bachelor's degree in law, and in 1963, he was called to the England bar, the same year he became a member of Lincoln's Inn, London.

== Legal career ==
Afe Babalola began his career at Ibadan, the capital of Oyo State, western Nigeria as a litigation lawyer at Olu Ayoola and Co, law firm. In 1965, after two years of legal practice, he established his own law firm, Afe Babalola and Co. (Emmanuel Chambers). In 1987, he became a Senior Advocate of Nigeria, the highest rank in Legal profession in Nigeria. In 2001, he was appointed Pro-Chancellor of the University of Lagos by Chief Olusegun Obasanjo, a former President of Nigeria. He held the position till 2008 during which he emerged as best Pro-Chancellor of Nigerian Universities consecutively in 2005 and 2006. In 2009, he established Afe Babalola University to promote education in Nigeria. In 2013, the university was ranked the second best private university in Nigeria and 17th of 136 universities in Nigeria.

== Arbitration ==
In 2002, he was inducted as a fellow in the Nigerian Institute of Chartered Arbitrators (NICArb). He was president of the institute from 2017 to October 2021. He made significant contributions towards the growth of the institute during his tenure. Despite his retirement, he has remained an avid supporter of NICArb and the ADR community.

== Personal life ==
Babalola is married to Modupe Mercy Babalola. He has nine children, including Prof Edward Babalola, Bolanle Austen-Peters and Folashade Alli (SAN).
