= Ajimudaoro Aladesanmi I =

King of Ado Ekiti

Ewi of Ado Ekiti
- Reign: 1886– 1910
- Predecessor: Ali Atewogboye
- Successor: Adewumi Agunsoye
- Born: Nigeria
- Spouse: Olori Ifalete
- Issue: Daniel Aladesanmi II
- House: Aladesanmi

Ajimudaoro Aladesanmi I was a Yoruba Oba who reigned as Ewi of Ado Ekiti in Nigeria from 1886 until 1910. He was the father of Daniel Aladesanmi II.
