= Afe Babalola University =

Private research university in Ado-Ekiti, Nigeria

- ABUAD
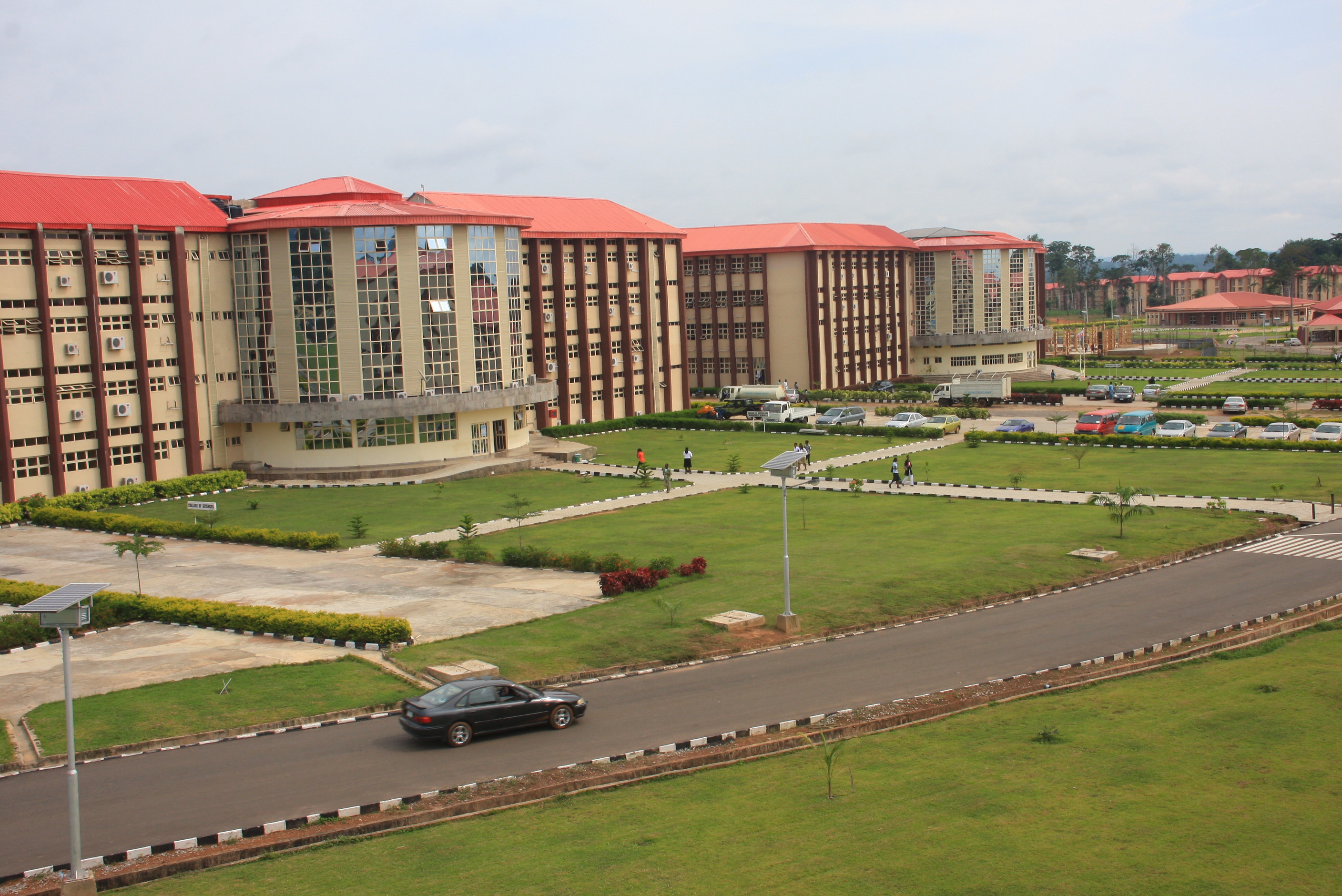
- Motto: Labor Servitum Et Integritas (Latin)
- Motto in English: Labor for service and Integrity
- Type: Private
- Established: 2009
- Chancellor: Afe Babalola
- Vice-Chancellor: Smaranda Olarinde
- Administrative staff: 1255
- Students: 8,500
- Location: Ado-Ekiti, Nigeria; 7.6709°N 5.3071°E
- Website: www.abuad.edu.ng

Afe Babalola University (ABUAD) is a private research university located in Ado-Ekiti, Ekiti State, Nigeria. It was founded by a lawyer and philanthropist, Afe Babalola, in 2009. It is recognized for high-quality education, ranked 1st in Nigeria and 3rd in Africa by Times Higher Education (2024-2025). Ranked 84th globally for impact in the 2025 rankings. The Engineering College built on three and half acres of land is reputed to be one of the largest in Africa. The college was inaugurated by the former President of the Federal Republic of Nigeria, Goodluck Jonathan. They do not lack in sports and athletics, as they came in first in both the NPUGA games 2025 and NPUGA championship 2026.

== Campuses ==
The university has one main campus which is located in Ado-Ekiti, Ekiti State, Nigeria. The campus is situated in the hilly part of the town directly opposite the Federal Polytechnic Ado-Ekiti.

The campus houses 6 undergraduate colleges, a postgraduate school, conference halls, a teaching hospital for medical students, student and staff accommodation, a sporting facility, and other auxiliary services such as a cafeteria for staff and students, a laundry, a bakery, and a water processing plant.

Afe Babalola University holds a reputation for being one of the few Nigerian universities to begin academic work in the campus permanent site. However, due to the requirement by the National University Commission that the school must possess a functioning teaching hospital, a memorandum of understanding with the Nigerian federal government to make use of the Federal Medical Center (FMC) Ido-Ekiti, Ekiti State as its teaching hospital for a period of ten years beginning from October 2014.

== Academics ==
=== Admission requirement ===
The admission requirement for the school varies between the different colleges. However, as with all Nigerian universities, for undergraduate programs the candidate is required to have at least 5 credits in subjects such as mathematics, English language and any other three subjects that are relevant to the course of study. The student is required to have passed the Joint Admission and Matriculation Board JAMB Unified Tertiary Matriculation Examination (UTME), after which the candidate is expected to take an oral interview with an academic staff of the prospective college before admission can be given. The university also offers direct entry admission to students who wish to transfer from another university or have undergone either an Advanced Level program or a degree foundation program. The level at which they are admitted into is decided by the college and varies among them. Admission: Minimum UTME score is 180, with options for direct entry and transfer students

=== Undergraduate colleges ===
The university operates a collegiate system and has six major colleges: The College of Engineering, College of Medicine and Health Sciences, College of Sciences, College of Law, College of Social and Management Sciences, and College of Pharmacy. Some of these colleges offer postgraduate programmes in selected departments.

==== The College of Law ====
The College of Law is fully accredited by the National University Commission (NUC) of Nigeria. The college consists of fully furnished classrooms, a common room, a library containing law journals and articles, and a moot court for students to have court practice sessions. There are a number of student chambers in the college backed by a staff mentor who battle against each other in moot court sessions. Associate Prof. Elisabeta Smaranda Olarinde (FCAI) is the pioneer provost of the college of Law and is still the current provost of the college; she is also the acting vice chancellor of the university. The College of Law, which is regarded as one of the best law colleges in Nigeria, offers both undergraduate and post-graduate degrees (master's level) in law

- LL.B Law

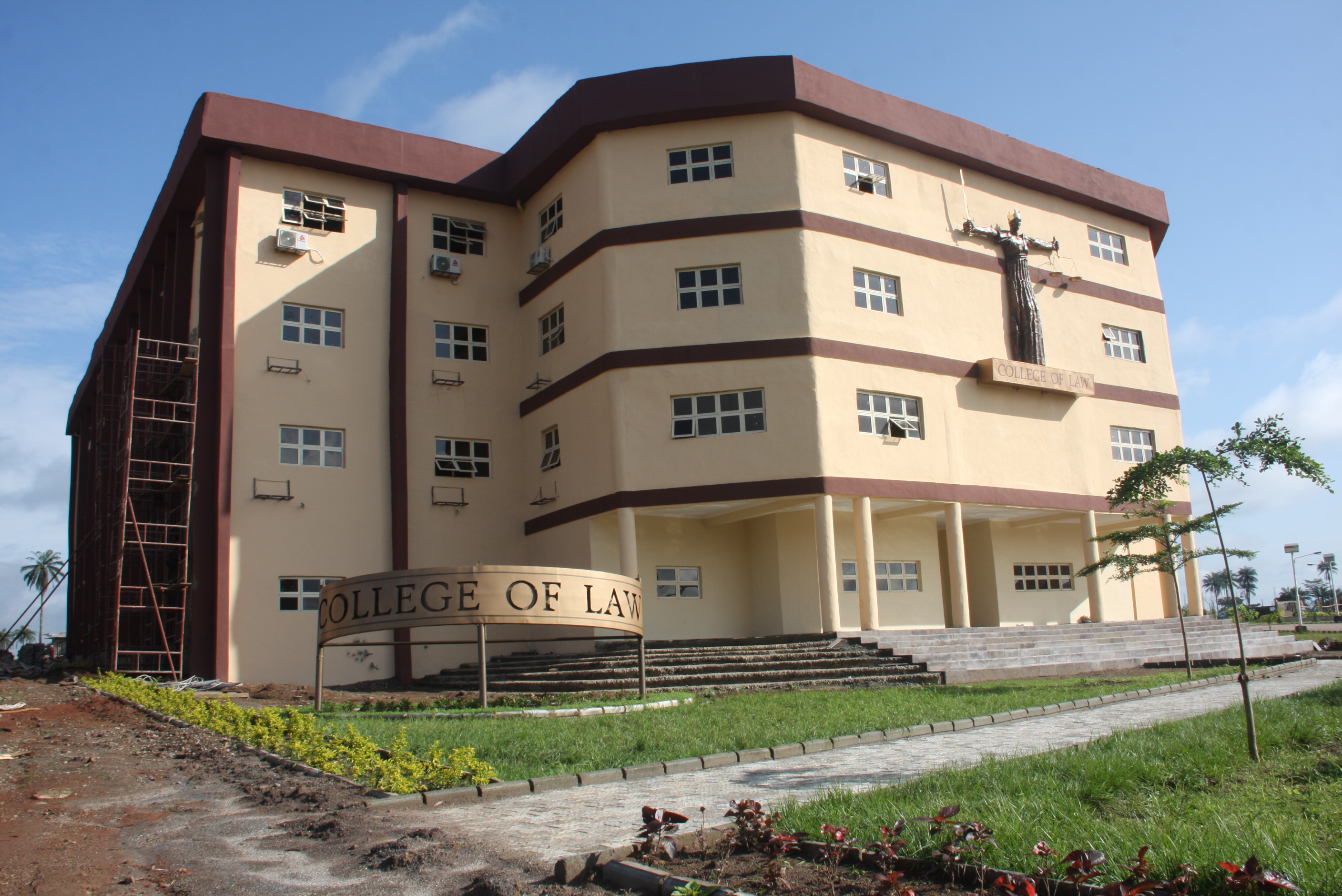
Afe Babalola University College of Law

==== The College of Engineering ====
The college of engineering was accredited by both the NUC and COREN during their one-week visit to the college. The main engineering building which houses laboratories, a central engineering library, lecturer rooms, an auditorium, a central engineering workshop and a certified Festo training center. The engineering building is named after the former Nigerian president Dr. Goodluck Jonathan and was commissioned by him on 20 October 2013 during the university's first convocation ceremony. Prof. Israel Esan Owolabi served as the pioneer provost of the college of engineering; he stepped down from the post in 2015 and he is currently engaged in teaching activities in the electrical/electronics engineering programme.

Academic programs

- B.Eng. Mechanical Engineering
- B.Eng. Mechatronic Engineering
- B.Eng. Electrical/Electronic Engineering
- B.Eng. Petroleum Engineering
- B.Eng. Civil Engineering
- B.Eng. Chemical Engineering
- B.Eng. Computer Engineering
- B.Eng. Agricultural Engineering
- B.Eng. Biomedical Engineering
- B.Eng. Aeronautical and Astronautical Engineering

==== The College of Sciences ====
The College of Sciences is one of the pioneer colleges of the university following the approval of the Nigerian University Commission (NUC). The university admitted students at inception on 4th January 2010.

Academic programs

- B.Sc. Microbiology
- B.Sc. Human Biology
- B.Sc. Biotechnology
- B.Sc. Biochemistry
- B.Sc. Chemistry
- B.Sc. Industrial Chemistry
- B.Sc. Computer Science
- B.Sc. Geology.
- B.Sc. Physics with Electronics
- B.Sc. Physics
- B.Sc. Petroleum Chemistry
- B.Arch Architecture

==== The College of Social and Management Sciences ====
At inception, on 4 January 2010 the university admitted students into the College of Social and Management Sciences, being one of the pioneer colleges of the university. The session ran smoothly without hitches from 4 January to August 2010. The second session of the university started on October 4, 2010, with over 1,000 students. So far the, university has maintained strict compliance with its academic calendar which makes it possible for students to pre-determine their possible date of completion of their programmes even before enrolment. It has been the policy of the university to post on-line students’ results within 24hours of approval by the Senate.

Academic programs

- B.Sc. Economics
- B.Sc. Accounting
- B.Sc. Banking and Finance
- B.Sc. Business Administration
- B.Sc. Tourism and Events Management.
- B.Sc. Political Science
- B.Sc. International Relations and Diplomacy
- B.Sc. Peace and Conflict Studies
- B.Sc. Intelligence and Security Studies
- B.Sc. Social Justice
- B.Sc. Communication and Media Studies
- B.Sc. Marketing
- B.Sc. Entrepreneurship
- B.Sc. Sociology

==== The College of Medicine and Health Sciences ====
The college commenced activities in October 2011 having been approved by National Universities Commission.

Academic programs

- Medicine and Surgery (M.B.B.S)
- B.NSc. Nursing Sciences
- B.MLS. Medical Laboratory Science
- B.Sc. Anatomy
- B.Sc. Physiology
- B.Sc. Human Nutrition and Dietetics
- B.Sc. Pharmacology
- B.Sc. Public Health
- Pharm.D Pharmacy
- B.DS. Dentistry
- OD. Optometry

==== The College of Arts and Humanities ====
Academic programs

- B. A. Performing Arts
- B. A. English
- B. A. History and International Studies
- B. A. Linguistics

==== The College of Agriculture ====
Academic programs

- B. Agric. Animal Science
- B. Agric. Agricultural Economics
- B. Agric. Extension Education
- B. Agric. Crop Science
- B. Agric. Soil Science

=== Postgraduate college ===
The university operates a collegiate system and has five major Postgraduate colleges. They are the College of Engineering, College of Medicine and Health Sciences, College of Sciences, College of Law and College of Social and Management Sciences

== College Of Law ==
The College of Law offers the Bachelor of Laws (LL.B) degree programme, designed to provide comprehensive legal education in line with the standards of the Nigerian University Commission (NUC).

== College of Medicine (and Health Sciences) ==
The College commenced academic and administrative activities in October 2011 following its formal approval by the National Universities Commission (NUC). This approval confirmed that the College satisfied the regulatory standards required for the establishment of academic programmes in Nigerian universities, particularly in areas relating to curriculum development, staffing, infrastructure, and learning facilities. The commencement of activities marked the beginning of its commitment to training competent healthcare professionals and advancing research in the medical and health sciences.The first batch preclinical science students were admitted through Post UTME Screening in November, 2011.

The College currently comprises eleven (11) academic departments offering a range of professional and biomedical programmes. These Include:

- Medicine and Surgery (M.B.B.S.) – Trains medical doctors in basic and clinical sciences for professional practice.
- Bachelor of Nursing Science (B.NSc.) – Prepares professional nurses with clinical competence and ethical standards.
- Medical Laboratory Science (B.MLS.) – Focuses on laboratory diagnostics and disease investigation.
- B.Sc. Anatomy – Studies the structure of the human body.
- B.Sc. Physiology – Examines the functions of body systems.
- B.Sc. Human Nutrition and Dietetics – Covers nutrition, diet therapy, and public health nutrition.
- B.Sc. Pharmacology – Studies drug actions, uses, and toxicology.
- B.Sc. Public Health – Addresses disease prevention, epidemiology, and health promotion.
- Doctor of Pharmacy (Pharm.D.) – Emphasizes clinical pharmacy and pharmaceutical care.
- Bachelor of Dental Surgery (B.DS.) – Trains dental surgeons in oral healthcare.
- Doctor of Optometry (O.D.) – Prepares professionals in vision care and eye health.
