= Ado Ekiti =

Capital city of Ekiti State, Nigeria

Ado Ekiti Ado Ewi
- City and LGA
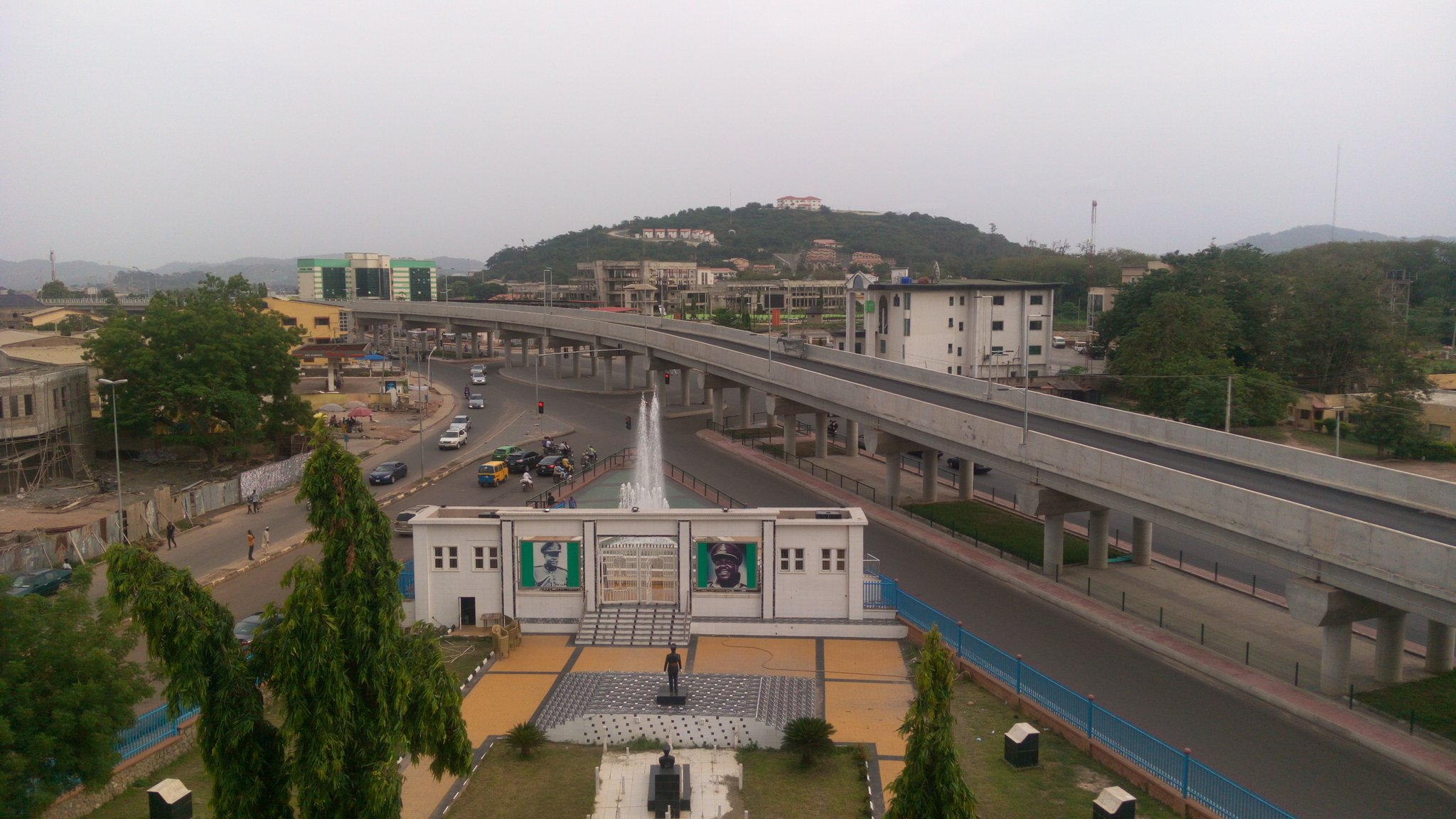
- Ado Ekiti Fajuyi park
- Interactive map of Ado Ekiti
- Location in Nigeria
- Coordinates: 7°37′16″N 5°13′17″E
- Country: Nigeria
- State: Ekiti State

Area
  - Total: 293 km^{2} (113 sq mi)
- Elevation: 455 m (1,493 ft)

Population (2006 census)
  - Total: 313,690
  - Estimate (2022): 469,700
  - Density: 1,070/km^{2} (2,770/sq mi)
- Time zone: UTC+1:00 (WAT)
- National language: Yorùbá

Short oral history of Ado Ekiti by a native speaker

Ado Ekiti is the capital city of Ekiti State, Nigeria. It is the headquarter of the Ekiti central senatorial district, southwest, Nigeria.

== History ==
Ado Ekiti is an ancient city, founded by Ewi Awamaro the son of Biritikolu. Awamaro (the restless one) left Ile-Ife with his father Ewi Apa Biritikolu and his uncle Oranmiyan to Ita Orogun and Benin respectively after staying briefly with Oloba in Oba-Ile in present-day Akure.

Both Oranmiyan (Oba of Benin) and Biritikolu first settled in Benin forests before disputes among their people led them to separate and Biritikolu sought a new home westward at Utamodi (Oke Papa). Ewi Biritikolu and one of his sons reigned there. It was Ewi Awamaro who migrated to Ulesun (Present day Ado-Ekiti) after staying briefly at Udoani (Ido Ani) and Agbado during the long migration. When Ewi Awamaro left Agbado, some elders remained behind to rest and gave the settlement the name Agba Ado (Elders' Camp) – Agbado-Ekiti as the town is known today.

== Population and demographics ==
The population in 2006 was 308,621. The people of Ado Ekiti are mainly of the Ekiti sub-ethnic group of the Yoruba.

== Climate ==
The rainy season in Ado-Ekiti is humid, oppressive, and cloudy, while the dry season is warm, muggy, and partially cloudy. The average annual temperature ranges from 17 °C (63 °F) to 32 °C (90 °F), rarely falling below 14 °C (57 °F) or rising over 35 °C (95 °F).

The greatest time of year to visit Ado-Ekiti for hot-weather activities, according to the beach/pool score, is from early November to late February.

Climate data for Ado Ekiti (1991–2020)
Month	Jan	Feb	Mar	Apr	May	Jun	Jul	Aug	Sep	Oct	Nov	Dec	Year
Record high °C (°F)	39.0 (102.2)	39.0 (102.2)	38.0 (100.4)	37.0 (98.6)	35.1 (95.2)	33.4 (92.1)	32.8 (91.0)	32.0 (89.6)	32.3 (90.1)	34.0 (93.2)	37.0 (98.6)	37.1 (98.8)	39.0 (102.2)
Mean daily maximum °C (°F)	33.3 (91.9)	34.6 (94.3)	33.9 (93.0)	32.4 (90.3)	31.3 (88.3)	29.8 (85.6)	28.4 (83.1)	27.8 (82.0)	28.9 (84.0)	30.3 (86.5)	32.4 (90.3)	33.2 (91.8)	31.4 (88.5)
Daily mean °C (°F)	26.3 (79.3)	28.1 (82.6)	28.4 (83.1)	27.5 (81.5)	26.8 (80.2)	25.8 (78.4)	25.0 (77.0)	24.6 (76.3)	25.2 (77.4)	26.0 (78.8)	27.0 (80.6)	26.4 (79.5)	26.4 (79.5)
Mean daily minimum °C (°F)	19.2 (66.6)	21.7 (71.1)	22.9 (73.2)	22.7 (72.9)	22.3 (72.1)	21.8 (71.2)	21.5 (70.7)	21.4 (70.5)	21.5 (70.7)	21.7 (71.1)	21.7 (71.1)	19.6 (67.3)	21.5 (70.7)
Record low °C (°F)	11.0 (51.8)	11.0 (51.8)	16.0 (60.8)	16.0 (60.8)	16.5 (61.7)	17.0 (62.6)	17.9 (64.2)	17.8 (64.0)	17.0 (62.6)	17.0 (62.6)	14.0 (57.2)	9.5 (49.1)	9.5 (49.1)
Average precipitation mm (inches)	16.3 (0.64)	34.7 (1.37)	83.9 (3.30)	139.5 (5.49)	168.0 (6.61)	198.5 (7.81)	184.2 (7.25)	150.7 (5.93)	244.5 (9.63)	160.1 (6.30)	37.1 (1.46)	6.6 (0.26)	1,424.1 (56.07)
Average precipitation days (≥ 1.0 mm)	1.2	2.5	5.9	7.9	10.2	12.5	12.9	11.2	15.0	11.6	3.4	0.7	94.9
Average relative humidity (%)	68.1	72.5	80.3	85.4	88.1	89.7	90.1	89.8	90.0	88.9	82.2	72.2	83.1
Source: NOAA

From January through April, Ado-Ekiti experiences a hot season, with March being the hottest month. August has the lowest average low and high temperatures of the cool season, which runs from June through October.

=== Cloud cover ===
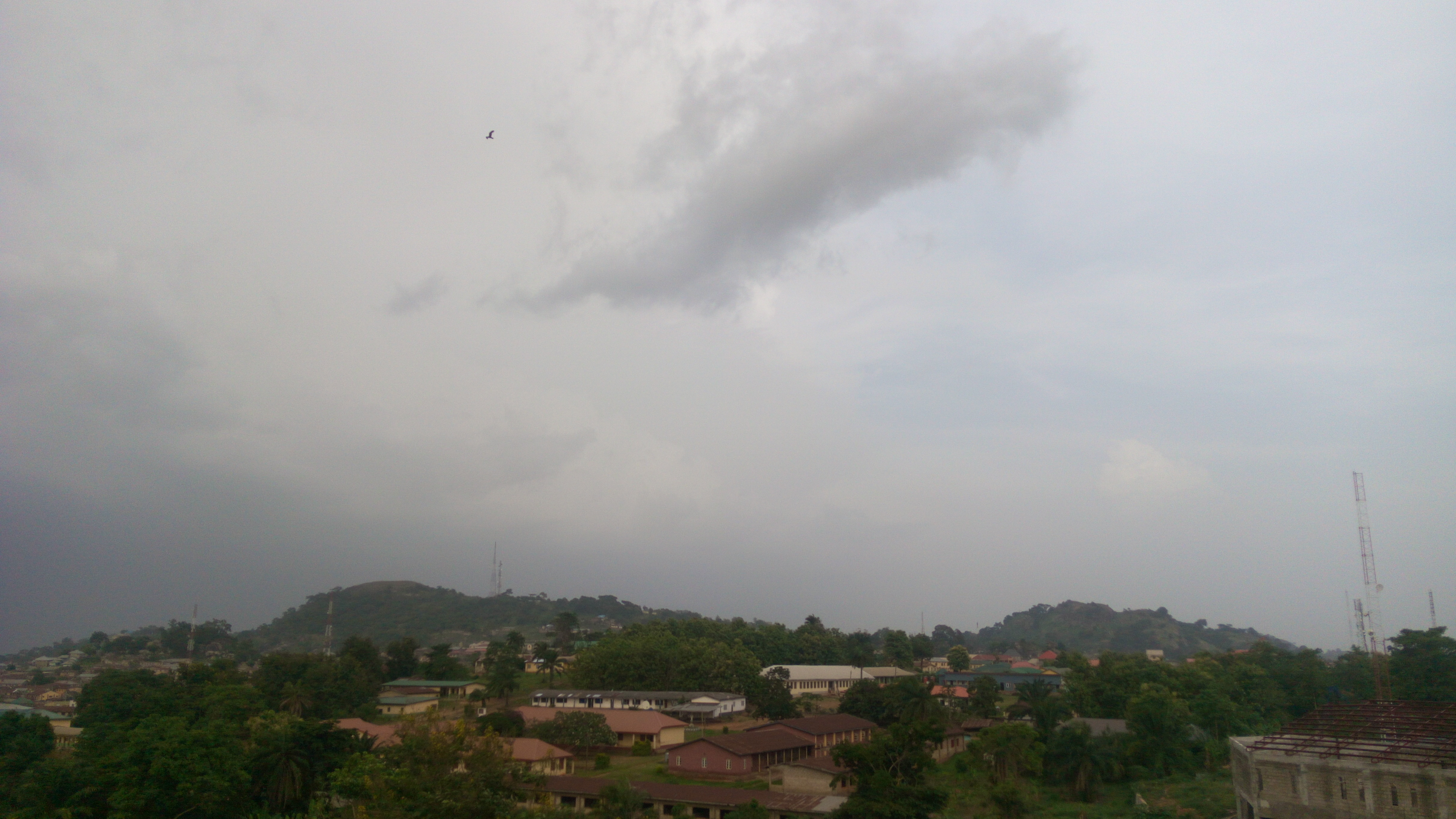
Cloudy

The amount of cloud cover varies significantly from season to season in Ado-Ekiti, with the brightest period lasting 2.9 months and the cloudiest period spanning 9.1 months. While 50% of the sky is either clear, fairly clear, or partly overcast in December, April has the most clouds.

=== Rainfall/Precipitation ===
Extreme seasonal fluctuation can be seen in the monthly rainfall in Ado-Ekiti, with a 9.2-month wet period from February 13 to November 18 having an average rainfall of at least 13 millimetres / 0.5 inches. With an average of 5 millimetres / 0.2 inches, December receives the least amount of rain, while September receives the most.

== Education ==
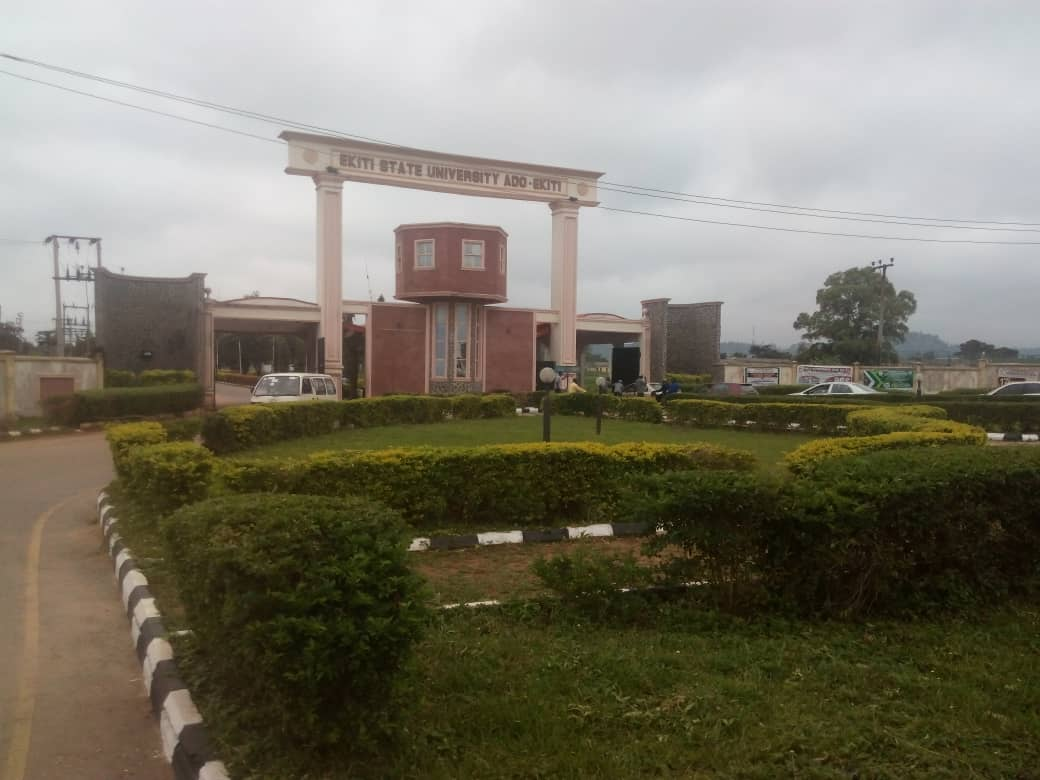
Ekiti State University

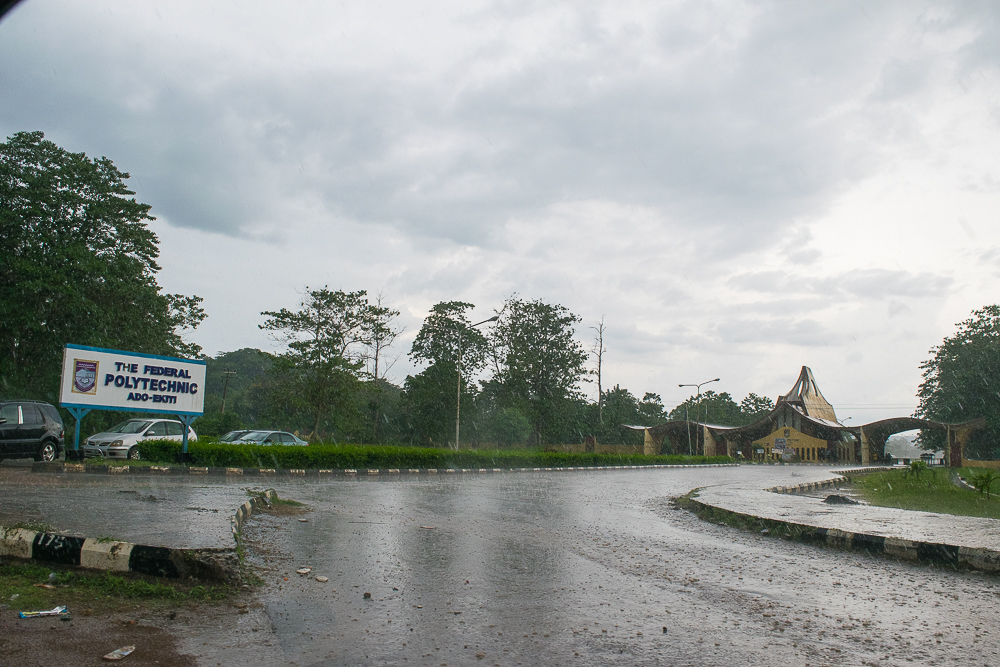
Federal polytechnic Ado Ekiti

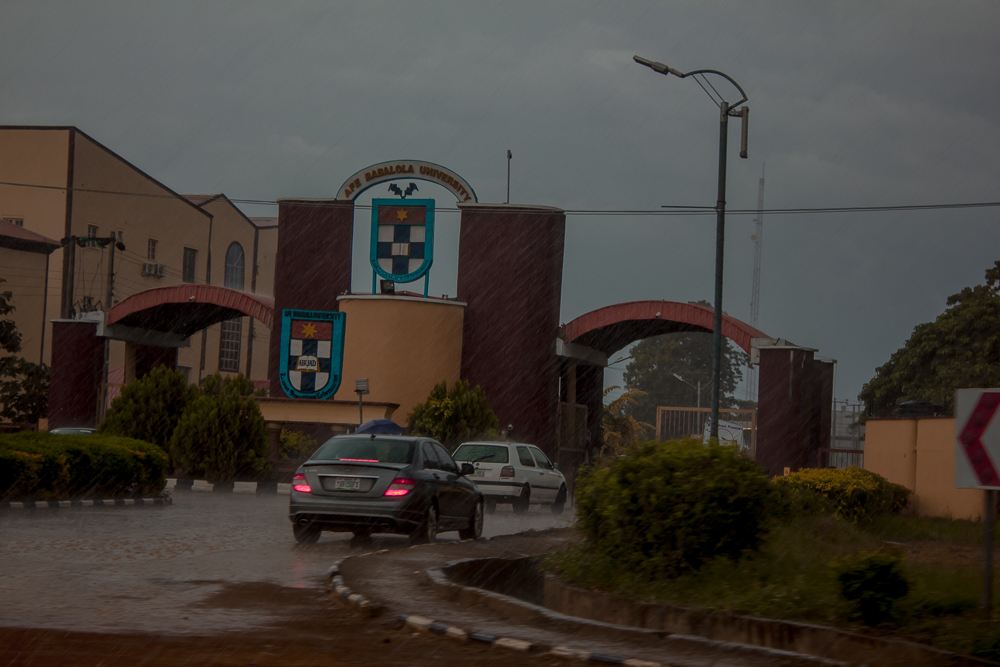
Afe Babalola University

Ado Ekiti City has a State owned University – the University of Ado Ekiti now Ekiti State University Ado-Ekiti, a privately owned University – Afe Babalola University Ado-Ekiti, a Polytechnic – the Federal Polytechnic, Ado-Ekiti, Federal University Oye, (FUOYE), Oye-Ekiti, privately owned polytechnic Crown polytechnic, Odo, Ado-Ekiti Isan Ekiti has a State owned Polytechnic the Ekiti State Polytechnic, Isan Ekiti Ekiti state also has another state university called the Bamidele Olumilua University of Education, Ikere Ekiti and a private university called Venite University, Iloro Ekiti.

== Pollution ==
Ekiti State Governor, Biodun Oyebanji, has concerned residents of the extension of the ongoing dredging of waterways and clearing of drains to their communities which is part of the effort to avoid flooding which had already dredged over 14-kilometre stretch of waterways in different parts of Ado Ekiti, the state capital.

== Media and economy ==
In Ado Ekiti, there are local media stations such as Nigeria Television Authority Ado Ekiti, Ekiti State Television (BSES), Radio Ekiti 91.5 FM, FRCN Progress FM, Fresh FM, Midas Radio, Abuad Radio, Voice FM, Ayoba FM, People's FM, New cruise FM. Various commercial enterprises operate in Ado Ekiti. The city is a trade centre for farm produce where yams, cassava, grain, and tobacco are grown. Cotton is also grown for weaving.

== Traditional leader ==
The current Ewi or ruler of Ado Ekiti is Rufus Aladesanmi III, who succeeded Samuel Adeyemi George-Adelabu I in 1990.

== Gallery ==
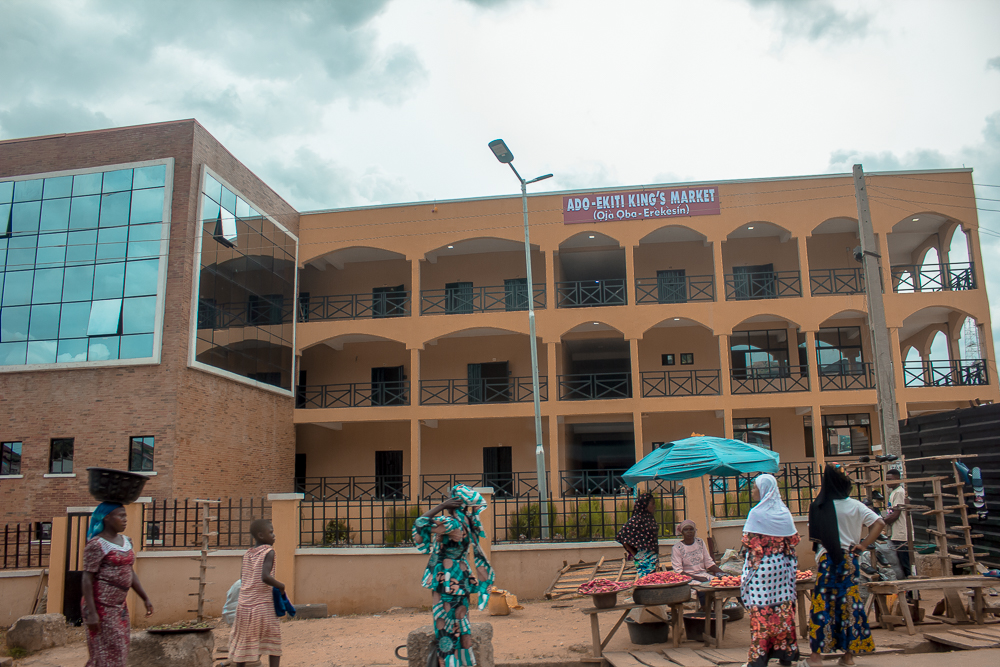

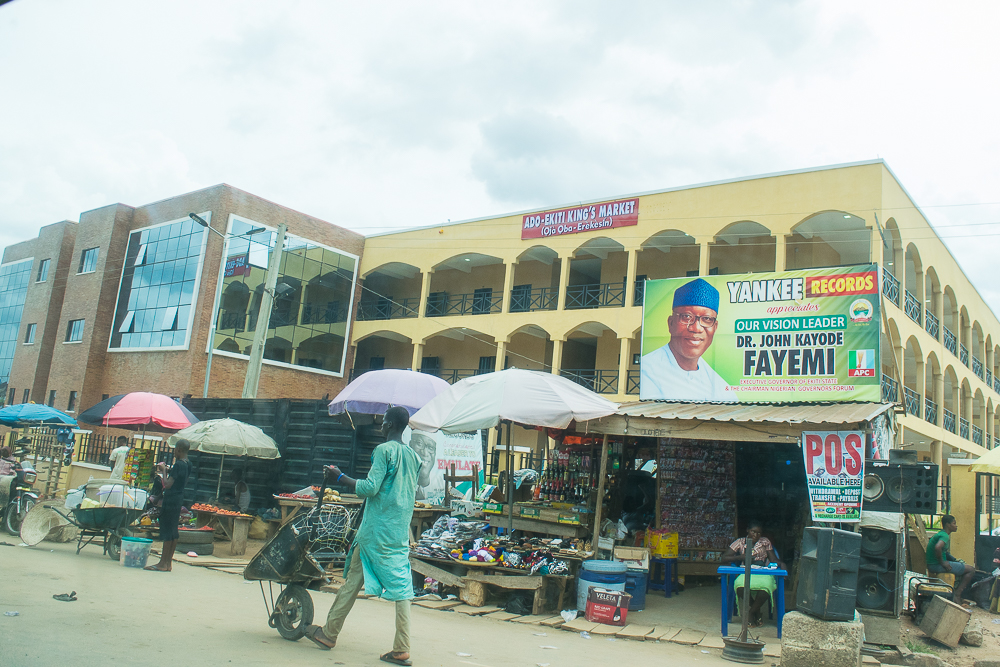

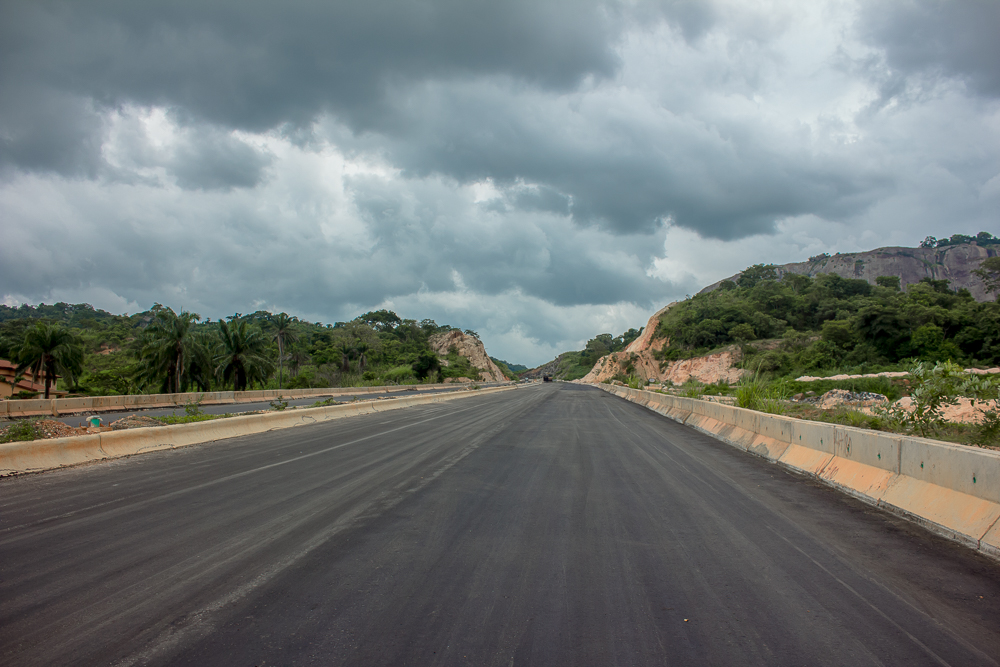

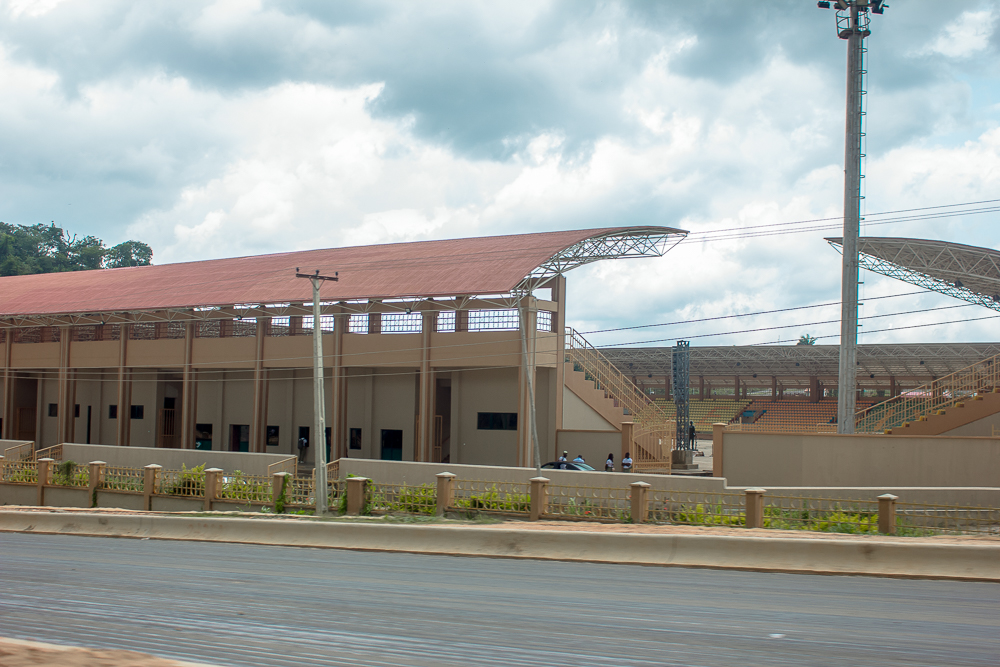

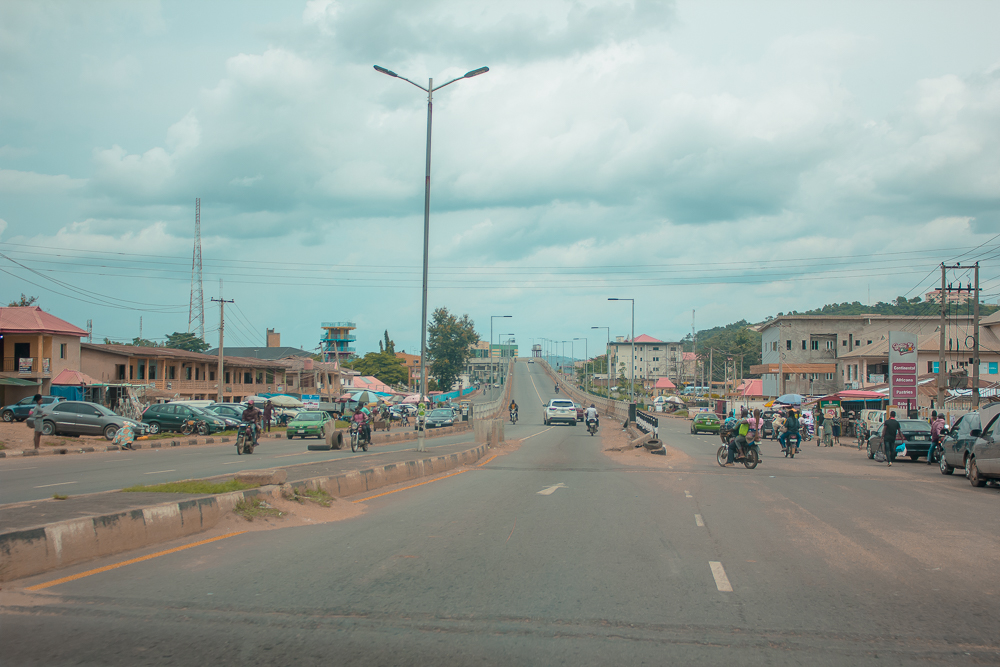

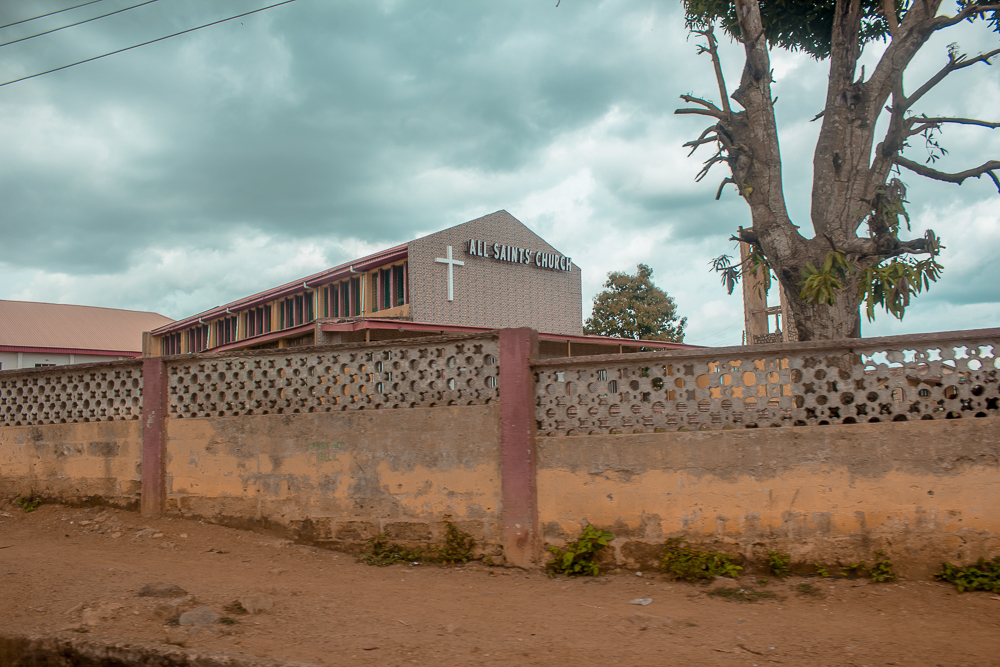
All saints church Iyin Ekiti

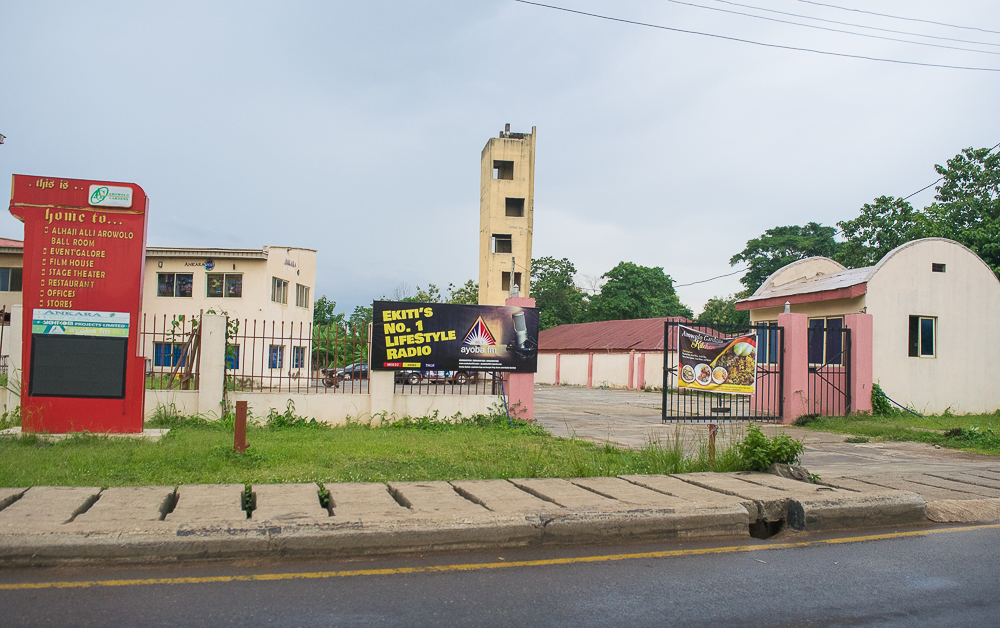
Ayoba fm, Ado-ekiti

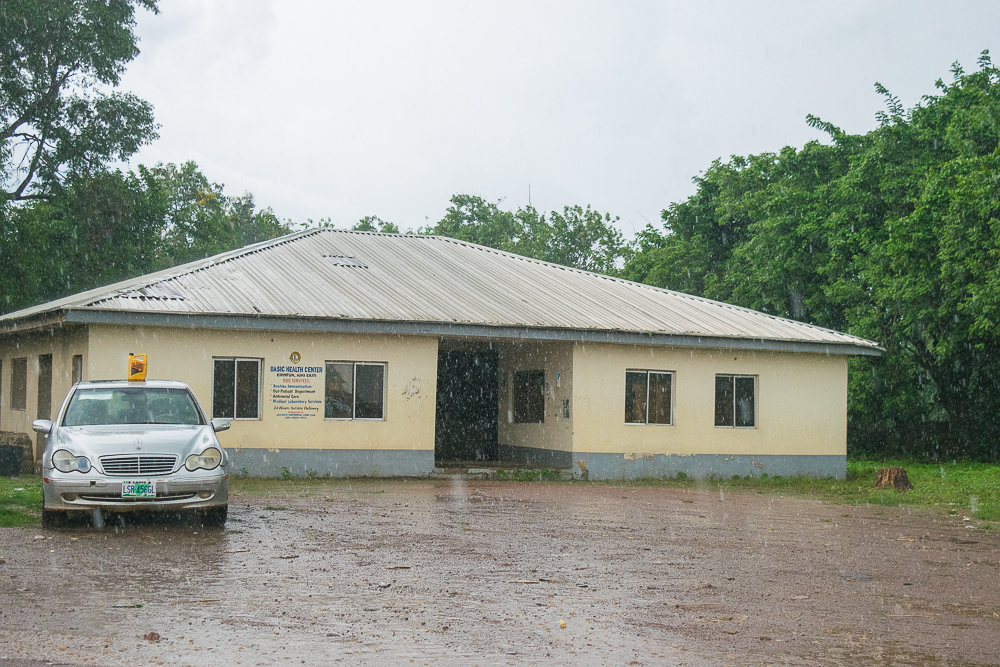
Basic Health Centre, Erinfun, Ado-ekiti

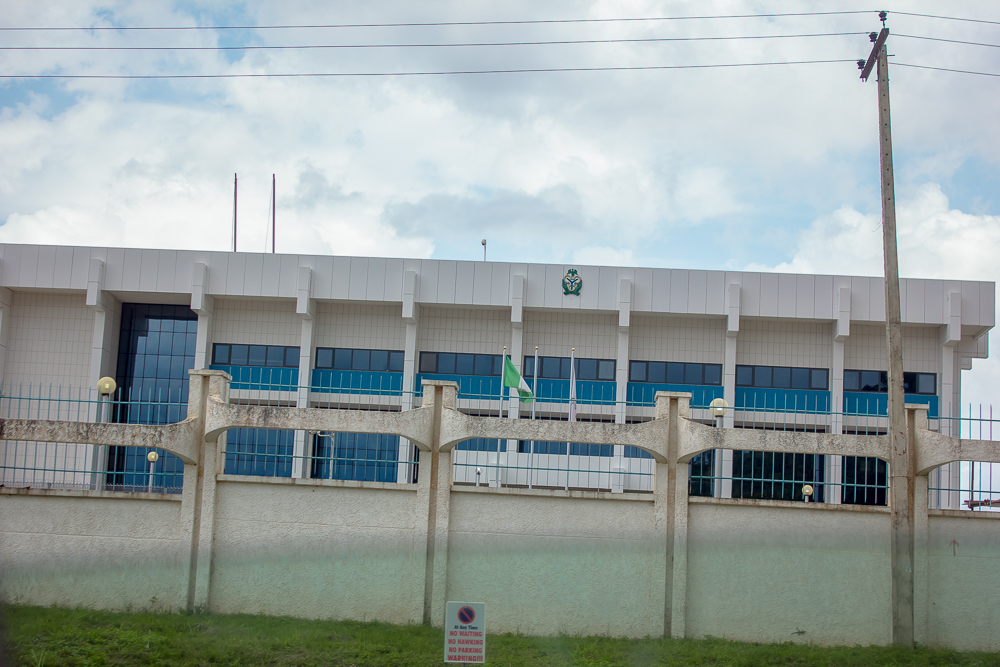
Central bank of Nigeria Ado ekiti

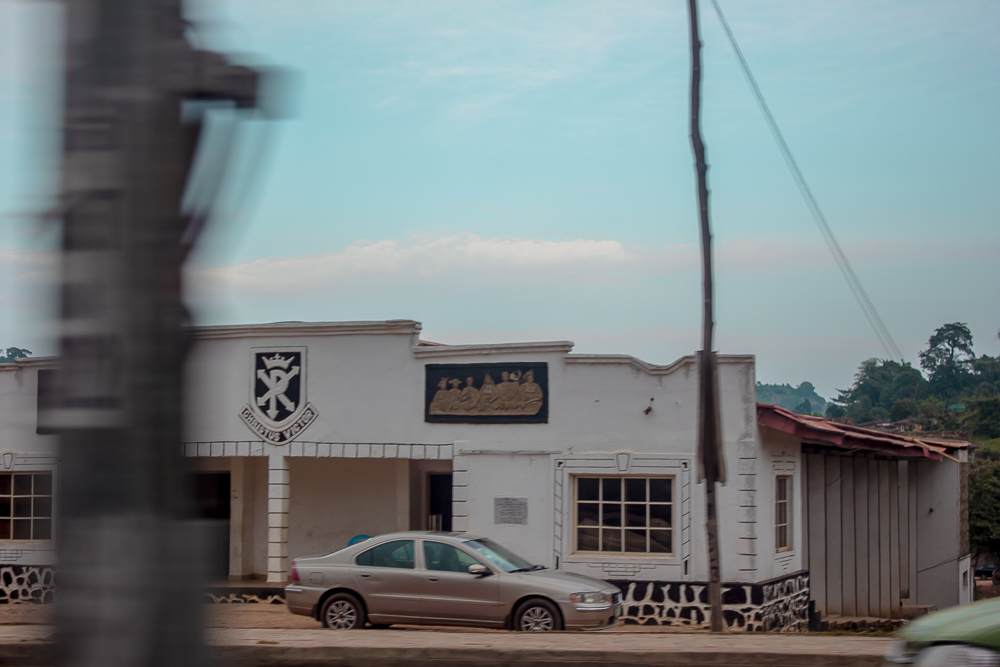
Christus victor house ado ekiti

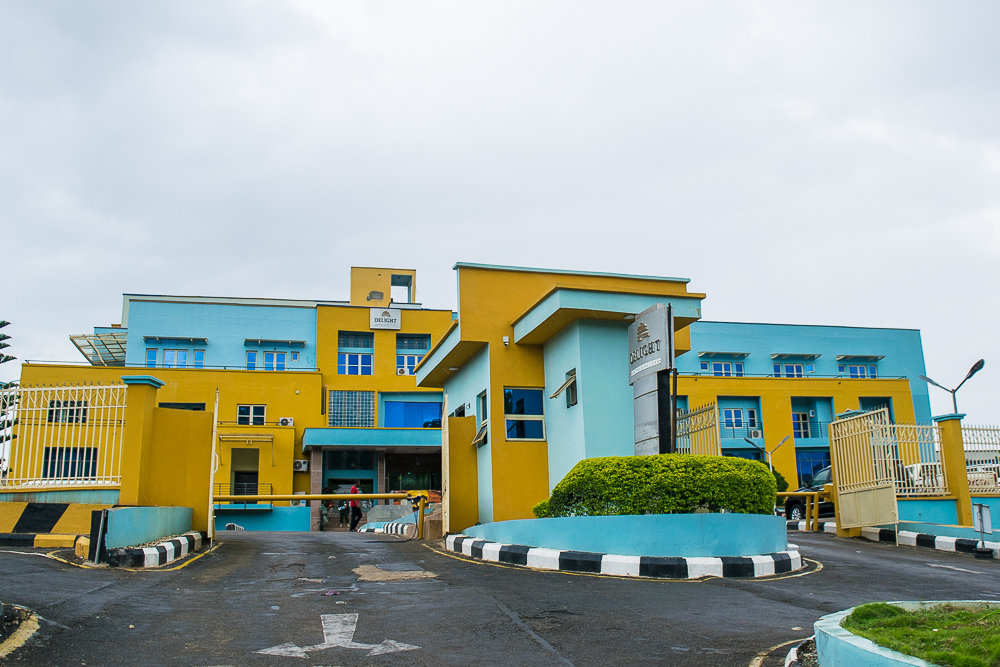
Delight Suites and Hotel, Ado Ekiti

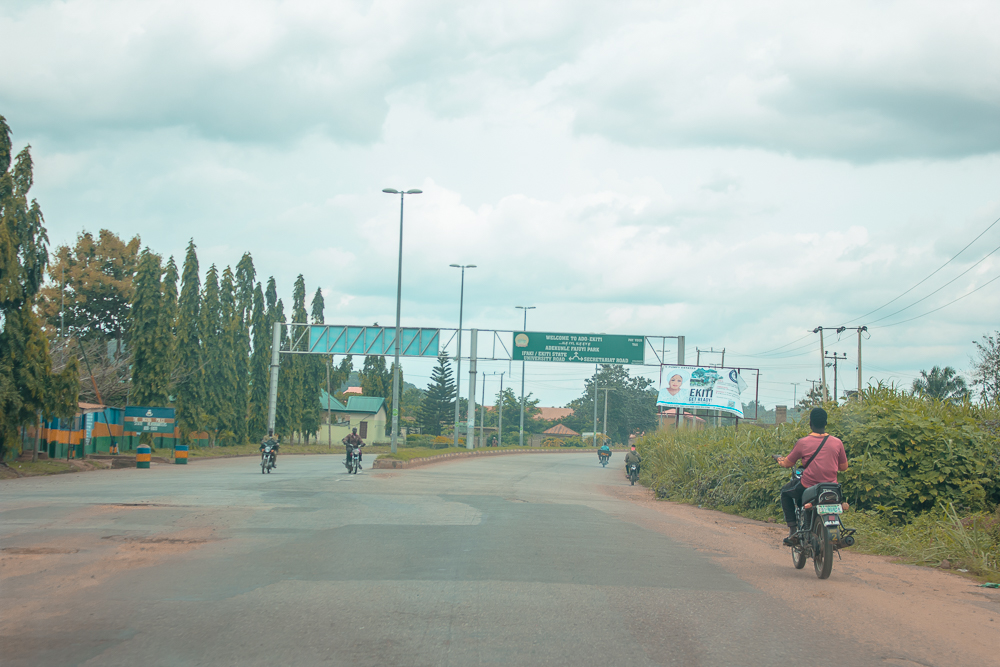
Welcome to Ado Ekiti signpost

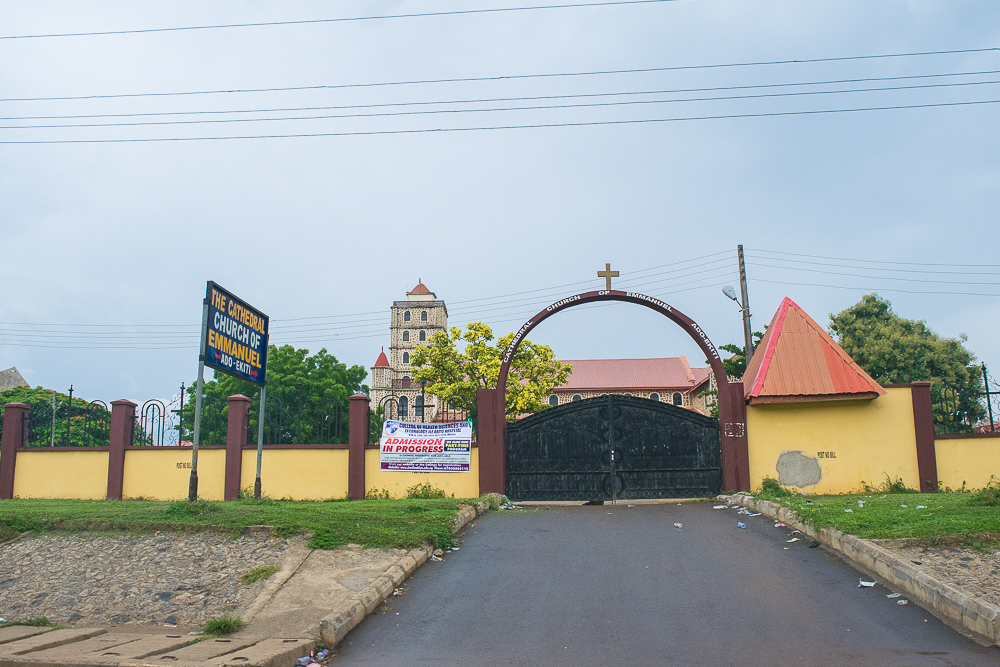
The Cathedral Church of Emmanuel, Ado-ekiti

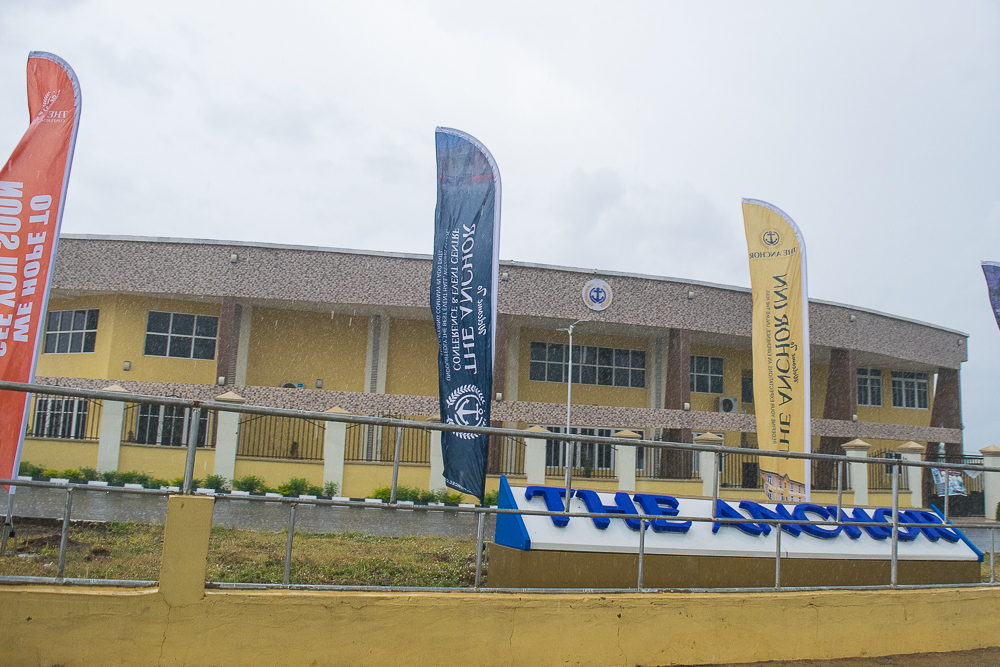
The Anchor event center, Adi-ekiti, Ekiti state
