= Ebele =

Nigerian given name

- Gender: Unisex
- Language: Igbo

Origin
- Origin: Igbo
- Meaning: Mercy
- Region of origin: Igboland

Other names
- Variant forms: Ebere, Eberechukwu, Ebelechukwu, Eberechi, Ebeleolisa

Ebele audio is an Igbo given unisex name which means "Mercy". The traditionally female name Ebele has broken gender barriers, gaining acceptance and popularity among males in modern times. Ebele is a girl's name which literally means "mercy, virtues or kindness". The diminutive form is Ebelechukwu which means "God's blessing or Merciful God" and the dialectal variation is Ebere.

== Notable individuals with the name ==
- Ebele Okaro, Nigerian actress and film producer
- Ebele Okoye, Nigerian American painter and animator
- Goodluck Ebele Jonathan, (born 1957) Nigerian politician and a former Nigeria president
- Ebele Ofunneamaka Okeke, Nigerian civil engineer
- Ebele the flutist, Nigerian flutist
- Ebelle Jade Ifediora, born 1992, Belfast, Registered Nurse.
- Ebele Ifedigbo, born 1988, Nigerian American social entrepreneur
