= Ayoola =

Ayoola is a given name and a surname. Notable people with the name include:

== First name ==
- Ayoola Adeleke (born 1923), Nigerian politician, labour activist, and senator
- Ayoola Ayolola (born 1987), Nigerian musician, singer, and actor
- Ayoola Erinle (born 1980), England international rugby union player
- Ayoola Smart (born 1994), Irish actress

== Middle name ==
- Moses Adeshina Ayoola Junior Odubajo (born 1993), English professional footballer
- Ayo Ayoola-Amale, Nigerian poet and layer

== Surname ==
- Adejoke Ayoola (born 1970), Nigerian-American academic
- Emmanuel Ayoola (1933–2024), Nigerian lawyer and judge
- Gbolahan Ayoola (born 1977), Nigerian-based painter
