= Tijani Surajudeen Olatunji =

Nigerian politician

Hon. Tijani Surajudeen Olatunji

Member, Lagos State House of Assembly
- Incumbent
- Assumed office 2019
- Constituency: Ojo Constituency II

Personal details
- Born: October 10, 1976 (age 49) Lagos State, Nigeria
- Party: All Progressives Congress (APC)
- Education: Ekiti State University Olabisi Onabanjo University
- Occupation: Politician
- Website: Lagos Assembly Profile

Tijani Surajudeen Olatunji (born 10 October 1976) is a Nigerian politician who currently serves as a member of the Lagos State House of Assembly, representing Ojo Constituency II under the platform of the All Progressives Congress (APC). He is the Chairman of the House Committee on House Services.

== Early life and education ==
Tijani Surajudeen Olatunji was born on October 10, 1976. He began his education at L.A. Primary School, Ilogbo Elegba, obtaining his First School Leaving Certificate in 1990. He proceeded to Ilogbo Elegba Grammar School for his secondary education, graduating in 1996.

He pursued higher education at Ekiti State University, graduating in 2003. He later obtained a degree in Public Administration from Olabisi Onabanjo University in 2011.

== Political career ==
Tijani Olatunji was first elected into the Lagos State House of Assembly in the 2019 general elections to represent Ojo Constituency II. He was re-elected for a second term in the 2023 general elections on the platform of the All Progressives Congress (APC).

In the 10th Assembly, he serves as the Chairman of the House Committee on House Services. This committee is responsible for the internal welfare and administrative logistics of the Assembly members and staff.
