= Damijo =

Damijo is a Nigerian surname. Notable people with the surname include:

- May Ellen Mofe-Damijo (1956–1996), Nigerian writer and journalist
- Richard Mofe-Damijo (born 1961), Nigerian politician and actor
