= Didi Museum =

Museum in Lagos, Nigeria

Didi Museum is a Nigerian private museum established in 1983. It is recognized as the first privately owned museum in Nigeria.

== History ==
Didi Museum was founded by Dr. Newton Jibunoh in memory of his younger sister, Edith Jibunoh, who died at the age of 13. The name "Didi" originated from Dr. Jibunoh's mispronunciation of his sister's name. The museum was officially inaugurated on May 11, 1983, within Dr. Jibunoh's private residence on Akin Adesola Street, Victoria Island, Lagos. The opening ceremony was presided over by His Royal Highness, Alhaji Ado Bayero, the Emir of Kano, who also served as the museum's first Chairman of the Board of Trustees.

The inaugural exhibition featured works by artists Kenny Adamson and Adamu Ajunam, attracting over 1,200 visitors during its five-day run.

In celebration of its 40th anniversary in 2023, Didi Museum announced the establishment of a new facility in Delta State, the founder's home state. The new headquarters is located within the Nelson Mandela Gardens & Resorts at the Asaba International Airport.

== Exhibitions ==
Didi Museum has exhibited the works of several artists including Ayoola Gbolahan, Lemi Ghariokw, Ebele Okoye, Isaac Emokpae, Ayodeji Awoyomi, Olawunmi Banjo, Chike Aniakor, Victor Ehikhamenor, Chinwe Chukwuogo-Roy, Olu Amoda, Kelechi Amadi-Obi and others.
