= Praise Fowowe =

Nigerian speaker, author and activist

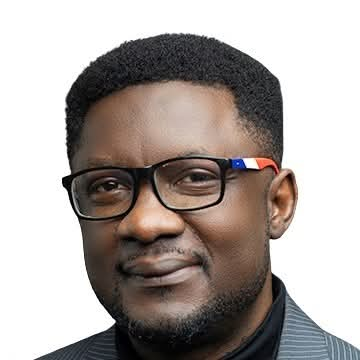
- Born: 1978 (age 47–48)
- Education: University of Ado Ekiti
- Occupation: Family life strategist

Praise Fowowe is a Nigerian speaker, author, family life strategist and the Principal consultant of Praise Fowowe Research LLC where he pioneers family life innovation and as well as the founder of The Institute of Family Engineering & Development Africa. In 2025, he was honoured with President's Lifetime Achievement Award by U.S. President Joe Biden for his contributions to family life innovation and global family dynamics.

== Early life and education ==
Fowowe was born on 16 September 1978 into the family of Anglican clergymen. He started his educational journey at St Mary Ijebu Imushin in Ogun state and later graduated from Victor College Ikare Akoko in Ondo state. Thereafter, he proceeded to University of Ado Ekiti to study accounting in 2000.

== Career ==
Fowowe journey into the development space under the mentorship of Bimbo Odukoya where he honed his skills. His defining moment came when he discovered teenage girls engaging in prostitution at a hotel in Ajegunle and he successfully reconciled the girls with their various families and then made it his life-long vision.

To address the root causes of such societal issues, Fowowe founded the Uncommon Man Network, an initiative that earned him the Youth leadership award by Leap Africa in 2006. Recognizing the urgent need to protect children from sexual abuse, he pioneered the Most Comprehensive Sexuality Education program equipping children with the knowledge and tools to safeguard themselves against predators.

He founded the Centre for Sex Education and Family Life in 2009 which holds a consultative status with the United Nations and has developed numerous programs which include The Out of the Box Parenting Model and the Human Engineering programming which has helped in various family developments.

He founded The Institute of family engineering and development Africa which presently trains family life professionals on family systems engineering approach to family life solutions.

Praise leads a team of Family life professionals to host the annual African Family life delegate conference.

He has also created a psychometric assessment, Oyela, a family intelligence infrastructure designed to discover the root cause and the roadmap for family life problems through data analytics

== Personal life ==
Fowowe married Oluwatosin, in 2008

and together they have two children, Tioluwanimi David and Imoleoluwa.
