= Bayode Isaiah Popoola =

Nigerian Academic

Professor Bayode Isaiah Popoola (born 28 April 1963) is a Nigerian academic and a Professor of Education specializing in Educational Foundations and Counselling. He was the first substantive Vice-Chancellor of Adeyemi College of Education.

== Early life and education ==
Bayode was born in Ikere Ekiti a town in Ekiti State. He obtained a Education Degree in English/Education in 1987 from the Ekiti State University. He obtained his master's degree in Guidance and Counseling (1995) and later received the doctor of philosophy in Guidance and Counselling (2003) from the Obafemi Awolowo University.

== Career ==
Bayode Isaiah Popoola started his academic career at Obafemi Awolowo University, where he served as Head of the Department of Educational Foundations and Counselling, Deputy Provost of the Postgraduate College, and Dean of the Faculty of Education at the University prior to his appointment as the first substantive Vice-Chancellor of Adeyemi Federal University of Education.
