= Adetola Akinola =

Nigerian social entrepreneur

- Born: Adetola Ogunjimi; Lagos state, Nigeria
- Education: University of Ado Ekiti; Lincoln University; Harvard University
- Occupation: Social entrepreneur
- Known for: President of Junior Chamber International Nigeria
- Notable work: Chief executive officer of Glitz Group of companies; 2019 President of Junior Chamber International Nigeria

Adetola Akinola is a Nigerian social entrepreneur, chief executive officer of Glitz Group of companies and 2019 President of Junior Chamber International Nigeria.

== Life ==
Adetola, originally from Ondo State, was born in Lagos as the first of five children. She graduated with a bachelor's degree in accounting from Ekiti State University, obtained her Master of Business Administration from Lincoln University, California and she attended Harvard University, Cambridge for a leadership development course. USA.

In 2004, She started her career at Zenith Bank Plc as a Youth Corper then rose in rank until September 2013 when she joined United Bank for Africa as Business Manager and then left in 2015 to establish her own company called Glitz Occasions Nigeria Limited.

She was elected as the National President of Junior Chamber International Nigeria in 2019.
