= Erhabor Emokpae =

Nigerian artist (1934–1984)

Erhabor Emokpae OON
- Born: Erhabor Ogieva Emokpae; 9 May 1934; Benin City, Edo State, Nigeria
- Died: 16 February 1984 (aged 49); Lagos State, Nigeria
- Resting place: Benin City, Nigeria
- Education: Yaba Trade Centre
- Notable work: FESTAC '77 emblem Oil painting of Queen Amina; Frieze decorations at National Arts Theatre
- Style: Dualism; realism; imperialism
- Movement: Society of Nigeria Artists; Lagos Arts Council

Erhabor Ogieva Emokpae OON (9 May 1934 – 16 February 1984) was a Nigerian sculptor, muralist, graphic artist and painter who is regarded as one of the pioneers of modern arts in Nigeria. Some of his notable works include the a bronze replica of the ivory mask of Queen Idia that was used as the official emblem of the Second World Black and African Festival of Arts and Culture (FESTAC 77) and a popular painting of Queen Amina. He is also responsible for the decorations on the four entrances of the National Arts Theatre, in Lagos.

== Early life and education ==
Erhabor Emokpae, a native of Oredo local government area in Edo State, was born on 9 May 1934, his father was a Bini Palace chief Ewekagosadoba and his mother was a Muslim from Benin City. After completing his basic education at the local Government School, Benin, in 1949, Emokpae entered Western Boys High School, Benin, that same year, leaving in 1951. He proceeded to study art at the Government Trade Centre (now Yaba College of Technology) in Lagos from 1951 to 1953. He went on to study art in England in 1963. The background of his upbringing made him dwell on themes of dualism in most of his artworks.

== Career ==
After graduating from Yaba Trade Centre, Emokpae participated in the 1950 Festival of Arts exhibition in Lagos, before going on to work as a trainee and commercial artist between 1954 and 1958 at the Ministry of Information in Enugu, after he was employed as an artist by the Federal Ministry of Information in 1953.

In 1958, he moved to Lagos and was employed by the West African Publicity (now Lintas West Africa, Lagos) as a creative visual artist. He went on to be promoted as the Senior Creative Advertisement Visual Artist in 1966, and in 1973 he became the Creative Director of the firm. He is regarded as one of the founding members of the Society of Nigerian Artists, an association in which he went on to hold the post of secretary from 1967 to 1975. He was also a member of the Lagos Arts Council and held the position of secretary in 1965.

== Works and exhibitions ==
During his lifetime, Emokpae initiated and held many exhibitions in several countries including Nigeria, West Germany, England and Brazil. He also took part in joint exhibitions including the Contemporary African Art, Camden Art Centre, London, the Contemporary Nigerian Prints and Painting and the University of Ife's "4th Ife Festival of the Arts Gallery" in 1971.

In 1973, he produced a replica of the Benin ivory mask as the official emblem for the FESTAC 77. He was also commissioned to design bronze decorations at the frieze and entrances of the National Arts Theatre in 1974.

== Recognition ==
In recognition of his contributions, he was conferred with the Officer of the Order of the Niger by Shehu Shagari in 1980.

== Personal life ==
His son Isaac Emokpae is also a notable painter and artist.
