= Olu Amoda =

Nigerian artist (born 1959)

- Born: 1959 (age 66–67); Warri, Niger Delta, Nigeria
- Education: Auchi Polytechnic; Georgia Southern University
- Occupations: Artist; sculptor
- Known for: Riverside Art and Design Studios, Lagos, Nigeria

Olu Amoda (born 1959) is a Nigerian sculptor, muralist, furniture designer, and multimedia artist best known for using relics of discarded consumer such as rusty nails, metal plates, bolts, pipes, spoons and rods to create sculptural figures, flora and animals to highlight Nigerians socio-political and cultural issues from sex, politics, race and conflict to economic distribution. He is the founder of Riverside Art and Design Studios in Lagos, Nigeria.

== Early life and education ==
Amoda was born in Warri in the Niger Delta, Nigeria, in 1959 to a goldsmith father. He studied sculpture in Auchi Polytechnic in Auchi, Nigeria, in 1983, and in 2009, he earned a master's degree in Fine Arts from Georgia Southern University in Georgia, USA.

== Career ==
Amoda is considered one of Nigeria's leading contemporary artists. In January 2020, he was announced the artistic director of Now Sculpture 2020 exhibition, by the Sculptors Association of Nigeria, for the 2020 National conference organised by ScAN. Due to his artistic fluidity, Amoda was among the contributors at historic Zaria Art Society (Zaria Rebels) in November 2019, at Victoria Island, Lagos.

In 2000, he worked as an artist-in-residence in Villa Arson in Nice, France, and at the Bag Factory in Johannesburg, South Africa, in 2003. He has also worked at the Appalachian State University, in Boone and at the New York Design Museum, in 2006 and 2010 respectively. He has participated in many exhibitions, including at the Newark Museum in New Jersey, USA, Museum of Art & Design, USA; Skoto Gallery, New York; Georgia Southern University, USA; Villa Arson in Nice, and the Bag Factory in Johannesburg, The World Intellectual Property Organization (WIPO) Headquarters, Switzerland; the Didi Museum, Nigeria; the 6th Biennale de L'Art African Contemporain, Senegal; the Newark Museum, Fondation Blachère and the Sindika Dokolo Foundation, the Victoria & Albert Museum, UK, among other places.

Amoda's work was featured in Lend Me Your Dream, a pan-African exhibition organized by the Foundation for the Development of Contemporary African Culture. in 2017, he established the Riverside Art and Design Studios in Yaba, Lagos. and started his teaching career in 1987, where he taught Sculpture and Drawing at the School of Art, Design and Printing at Yaba College of Technology in Lagos since.

=== Selected works ===
- Index Season ii, June 2017 at Eko Hotels & Suites, Victoria Island, Lagos.

== Awards ==
Amoda has received numerous prestigious awards including:

- The Delta State Honor For The Most Innovative Sculptor of The Year.
- In 2014, his work Sunflower earned him the Grand Prix Léopold Sédar Senghor prize at Dak'Art, the 11th Biennial of the Contemporary African Art in Dakar, Senegal. An art which explores the connection between mass industry and the organic.
