= Africa Movie Academy Award for Best Animation =

Award Ceremony

The Jubril Malafia Africa Movie Academy Award for Best Animation is an annual merit by the Africa Film Academy to reward the best animated films for the year. In 2025, it was renamed after Jubril Malafia, a Nigerian animator who was murdered in 2018 in Jos, Plateau State.

== List ==
Best Animation
Year	Film	Nation	Recipient	Result
2008	The Lunatic		Ebele Okoye	Won
2009	Kono			Won
2009	Leila			Nominated
2009	Little Learning is Different			Nominated
2009	Manani Ogre			Nominated
2009	Cheprono			Nominated
2010	Hanayns Shoe			Won
2010	Adventure of Alayo			Nominated
2010	Zoodo			Nominated
2010	Lyrics			Nominated
2010	One Step of Love			Nominated
2012	The Legend on Ngong Hills	Kenya		Won
2012	Oba			Nominated
2012	Climate Change is Real			Nominated
2012	Egu			Nominated
2012	Nauliza			Nominated
2013	Adventures in Zambezia	South Africa		Won
2013	Tageni’s Dol			Nominated
2013	Mission Impossible			Nominated
2013	Oba			Nominated
2013	Lion Of Judah			Nominated
2014	Khumba	South Africa		Won
2014	The Hare and the Lion			Nominated
2014	Thank God its Friday			Nominated
2014	Leila			Nominated
2014	The Brats and Toy Thief			Nominated
2015	The Legacies Of Rubies			Won
2015	The Throne			Nominated
2015	Alternative to Corporal Punishment			Nominated
2015	Akorkoli			Nominated
2016	The Pencil			Won
2016	The Peculiar Life of a Spider			Nominated
2016	Funsie Fast Fingers			Nominated
2016	Lazare Sie Pale			Nominated
2017	Got Flowers			Won
2017	Black Barbie			Nominated
2017	Gyrow			Nominated
2017	Pull			Nominated
2018	Belly Flop			Won
2018	Group Photo			Nominated
2018	Untitled			Nominated
2018	Crush			Nominated
2019	Choices			Won
2019	Afrogames			Nominated
2019	Isolated			Nominated
2019	Kitwana Journey			Nominated
2020	I am leaving In Ghana Get Me Out of Here			Won
2020	From Here To Timbuktu			Nominated
2020	Malaika (The Warrior Queen)			Nominated
2020	A Special Gift			Nominated
2020	The Legend of Lwanda Magere			Nominated
2020	FTFO			Nominated
2020	Sankofa			Nominated
2020	A Gugle Day			Nominated
2021	Lady Buckit& the Motley Mopsters	Nigeria		Won
2021	Room 5			Nominated
2021	Shaka-InklosiYamakhosi			Nominated
2021	The Pyramid			Nominated
2021	Mofiala			Nominated
2021	A Thousand Fate			Nominated
2021	White Nights			Nominated
2022	No Way Out	Uganda		Won
2022	On the Surface	Iceland		Nominated
2022	Opal	Martinique (France)		Nominated
2022	Kenda	Cote D’Ivoire		Nominated
2022	Skin Like Mine	USA		Nominated
2022	PTD	Nigeria		Nominated
2023	Lost	Uganda		Won
2023	Azania Rises	South Africa		Nominated
2023	Jabari	Ghana		Nominated
2023	Bashorun Gaa	Nigeria		Nominated
2024	Counter Punch	Kenya		Won
2024	Heavy Crown	Libya		Nominated
2024	Journey of the Legend	Cameroon		Nominated
2024	Hadu	Nigeria		Nominated
2024	Between Paya and Koulou	Senegal		Nominated
2024	Oya (The goddess of gods)	Nigeria		Nominated
2024	Set Pieces	Sudan		Nominated
2025	My Brother, My Brother	Egypt/France/Germany		Won
2025	Dawn	Cameroon		Nominated
2025	The Travails of Ajadi	Nigeria		Nominated
2025	Nkizzi’s First Day	Uganda		Nominated
2025	Amara and the Spirit of Nyamagunda	Uganda		Nominated
2025	Monologue	Nigeria/UK		Nominated

== See also ==
- List of animation awards
