= Ebele Okoye =

Nigerian-American painter and animator

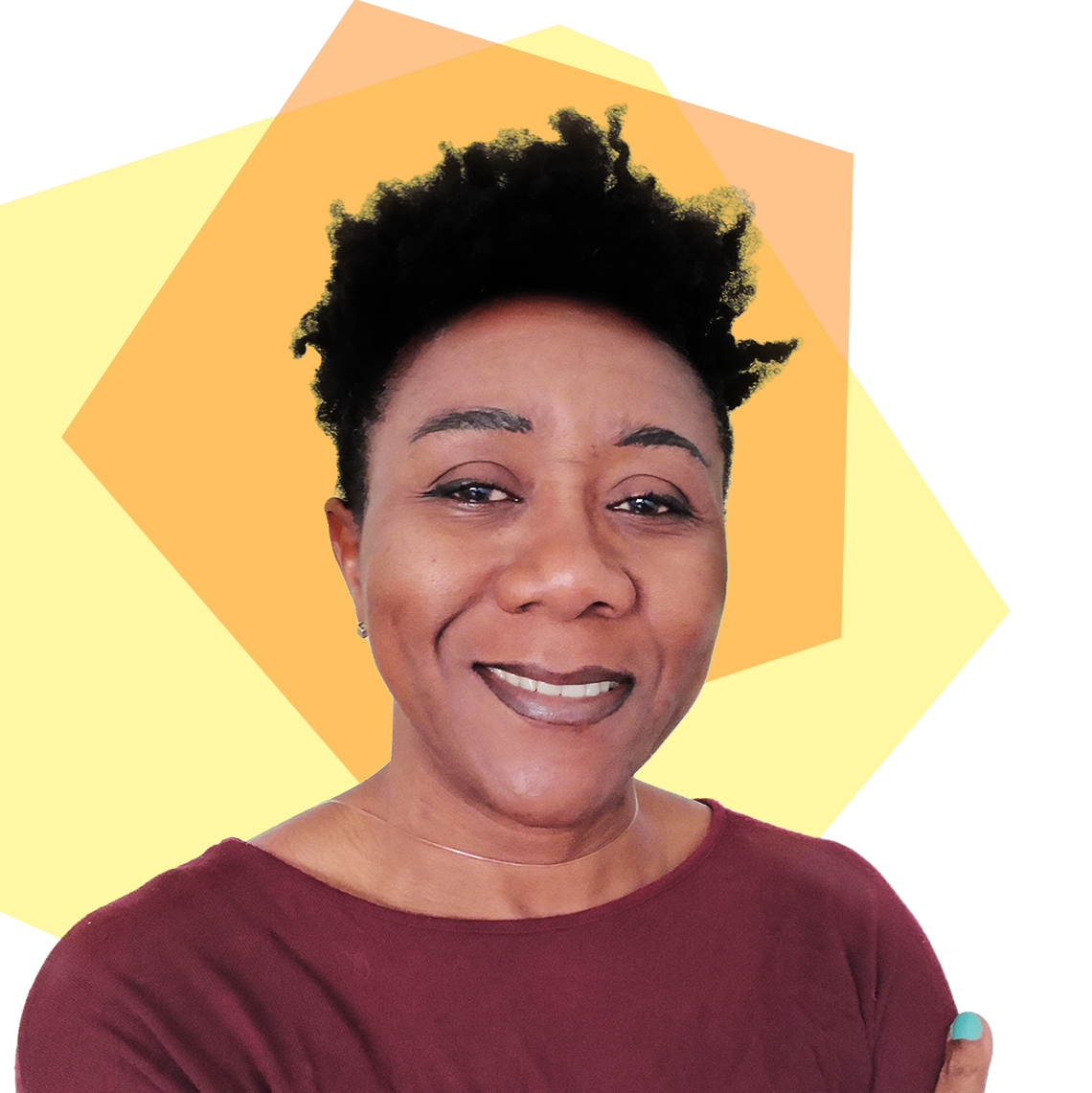
- Born: 6 October 1969 (age 56); Onitsha, Anambra State
- Other name: Omenka Ulonka
- Citizenship: Nigerian / German
- Education: IMT Enugu, Fachhchschule Duesseldorf, IFS Cologne
- Occupations: Animator; Designer; Painter
- Notable work: Anna Blume, The Legacy of Rubies
- Website: ebeleokoye.com spunkytoonz.com jollysquid.com

Ebele Okoye also known as "Omenka Ulonka" is a Berlin-based Nigerian/German independent animation producer/director, designer, and multi-media artist. She was born on October 6, 1969, in Onitsha, Anambra State, Nigeria. Being Nigeria's first female animator, she is recognized as one of the pioneers of African animation and is often referred to as the "mother of African Animation." With over 16 years of experience in the animation industry, Ebele has made significant contributions to the field and is an influential figure in both the animation and poetry film communities. She has lived in Germany since the year 2000.

== Early life and education ==
Okoye studied Fine and Applied Arts (Graphic Design/Illustration) with a Higher National Diploma from the Institute of Management and Technology in Enugu from 1985 to 1989. Between 1990 and 1995, she worked as a Graphic designer, Copywriter, and Branding specialist as well as a cartoonist for several Agencies, Tabloids, and newspapers in Nigeria, including the defunct posh "Classique magazine" run by May Ellen Mofe-Damijo and Richard Mofe-Damijo.

On arriving in Germany in 2000, she did a guest program in African Studies at the University of Cologne, She continued with a study-stint in Communication Design at the University of Applied Sciences in Düsseldorf with a traineeship at the West German Broadcasting Corporation (WDR) From 2003 to 2004, she trained in traditional 2D cartoon animation at the Internationale Filmschule Köln. She is a fluent speaker of Igbo, English, and German.

== Career ==
Before migrating to Germany in 200, Ebele Okoye was active in fine and media arts and constantly showed her works in both one-man and group exhibitions (see section). Upon graduation from the Animation school in 2004, Ebele briefly worked as a key animator in animation studios before venturing into independent animation production in 2006.

Earlier in 2009, she founded Shrinkfish Animation Studios in Abuja, Nigeria, which aimed to operate with a remote working model. Though this model was ahead of its time, it inspired the development of her subsequent successful studio, Jolly Squid Ltd (Jolly Squid Media). This studio has thrived, particularly after the adoption of remote work due to the COVID-19 pandemic.

Between 2007 and 2013, Ebele contributed as a writer in some relevant publications and journals including (compiling the Nigerian Chapter for) the book in the book “Animation: A World History”, by the Italian historian Giannalberto Bendazzi. In addition, Ebele contributed to the early editions of the (now defunct) Journal "Nigerian Brands", where she wrote animation-relevant articles. She also founded "The Animation Club Africa", a networking platform on Facebook in 2010.

In 2013, she founded the Shrinkfish Media Lab (smedLAB) which was Nigeria's pioneer animation course. After that, she went on to modify the course for further editions but the Ebola Epidemic that lasted till 2016 disrupted these plans.

In 2015, The Legacy of Rubies won the Africa Movie Academy Award for Best Animation. In her acceptance speech for the award in Port Elizabeth, South Africa, Okoye stated, "I did not make this film to chase awards," "I made this film to inspire every African animator who wants to make animation films." The Legacy of Rubies had its Canadian premiere at the Toronto Black Film Festival in 2016. In the same year, she announced plans for a feature-length film, hinting that it might be "like Chronicles of Narnia and Pocahontas put together." Later in 2023, Okoye published a social media article explaining why this film never came to fruition as it was marred by several life occurrences and announced that it is back to the slate for development

In 2019, Okoye began creating virtual reality (VR) art and animation in Oculus Quill; many of these pieces can be viewed on her website.

In 2021, Ebele introduced "Motion to the Sound(MTTS)", a "sustainable" version of smedLAB, with special subprograms "AniJolly Girls" (targeting only women) and MTTS Quick Slice (targeting young people). A year later, in 2022, Ebele founded Spunky Toonz, a branded animation and EdTech startup that creates audio-visual materials aimed at shaping healthy, communal, and ecology-friendly mindsets in preschoolers and young children.

Throughout her career so far, Ebele has produced animation films and led international co-productions, collaborating with diverse clients and partners, including Universal Music Group for whom she animated the Motown Hit "Dancing in the Street" by Martha and the Vandellas, Universal Pictures, Nickelodeon, Deutsche Welle Documentary, ZDF/ARTE, Robert Bosch Foundation, BMZ/GIZ, Focus Features, Deutsche Aidshilfe, and more.

Ebele's work has earned her numerous awards and recognitions, including the Robert Bosch Foundation Promotional Prize for Animation (for Anna Blume, based on a 1919 poem by Kurt Schwitters,), DEFA Foundation Research Prize, Africa Movie Academy Awards (2x), the Redefreiheit of Amnesty International for "Outstanding media work in human rights issues," and the Focus Features Africa First Short Film Programme, (for The Legacy of Rubies) among many others.

== Awards ==
Awards and recognitions received by Okoye
Year	Work	Award	Association	Result
2015	The Legacy of Rubies	Africa Movie Academy Award for Best Animation	Africa Movie Academy Awards	Won
2015	The Legacy of Rubies	Africa International Film Festival	Africa International Film Festival	Won
2015	The Legacy of Rubies	Silicon Valley African Film Festival	Silicon Valley African Film Festival	Won
2012	Patterns	Redefreiheit	Amnesty international	Won
2010	Anna Blume	Zebra Poetry Film Festival, Berlin	Zebra Poetry Film Festival, Berlin	Won
2010	The Essence	Silicon Valley African Film Festival	Silicon Valley African Film Festival	Won
2010	The Esence	California State Legislature	California State Legislature	Won
2010	Anna Blume	Zebra Poetry Film Festival, Berlin	Zebra Poetry Film Festival	Won
2008	The Lunatic	Africa Movie Academy Award for Best Animation	Africa Movie Academy Awards	Won
2007	Anna Blume	Robert Bosch Foundation	Robert Bosch Foundation	Won
2006	Feet Voters	DEFA Foundation	DEFA Foundation	Won
2007	Paper Mouse	Made for Mobile Awards Cologne, Germany	Made for Mobile Awards Cologne, Germany	Won

== Initiatives ==
- Motion to the Sound - 2021, a site where freelance minority animators can network with other creators, improve their work with challenges, and expose their animations to a larger audience.
- Open Toonz Animation Lab - 2015, a project based around the Open Toonz application, where users can connect with each other, share feedback, learn, and even contribute to the development of the software.
- Shrinkfish Media Lab (smedLAB) - 2013, Nigeria's pioneer animation course, which aspires to uplift minority voices in animation.
- Animation Club Africa - 2010, A community hub on Facebook aimed at networking animators and building a supportive community.

== Teaching, speaking, jury, curation and industry writing ==
Ebele has taught animation at the Bauhaus University Weimar and collaborated as an animation and design instructor with various organizations, including the city of Hamburg, Nollywood Germany, Zanzibar International Film Festival, Goethe Institut Nigeria and Tanzania, Afrika Festival Warsaw, Prirodoslovno grafička škola Zadar and more.

Ebele is a sought-after voice in film curation, selection committees and juries as well as speakers for animation and film industry-related events, markets and festivals. These include Africa International Film Festival, the Oscar Qualifying Festival Interfilm Berlin, Durban International Film Festival, Zebra Poetry Film Festival, "SCHLiNGEL" Children's and Youth Festival, Festival of Animation Berlin, Poetry Film Prize Weimar, Chitrakartha17’ Students‘ Animation festival, Ahmedabad, Madagassy Talent Film Residence, Interfilm Berlin and many others.

Okoye also curates African animation screenings around spaces in Germany.

== Brands ==
Ebele is also involved in branding, design, and art. She founded the art and ethnic fusion labels "Kalodei Berlin ®" and "Olomenka ®." A self proclaimed eccentric brand with handmade products based in Berlin.

== Filmography ==
- 2023 Spunky TALES | The Lion, the elephant and the Giraffe [03 min | Director, Voice over]
- 2022 Jurassic World Dinos De Facto _ Trainhopper [A promo animation commissioned by Universal Pictures]
- 2021 The world in my head [A compilation of several VR animation projects]
- 2020 Martha and the Vandellas, Dancing in the Street [A Motown Hit music video | Commissioned by Universal Music | Scriptwriter, Director | Animator]
- 2020 Oil Promises [120 min, DW Documentary | Co-director, Animator, Voice over]
- 2019 Summer trance [Immersive VR Animation]
- 2017 Marcas de amor [2D Short, Germany, Spain | Writer, Animator, Director, Producer]
- 2016 The Man who fell up [2D Short, Germany | Writer, Animator, Director, Producer]
- 2016 Three Wise Women [2D Short, Germany | Writer, Animator, Director, Producer]
- 2015 Red Fruits [Music Video | Germany, Austria | Scriptwriter, Animator, Director, Producer]
- 2015 The Legacy of Rubies [2D Mid length, Germany, Nigeria, USA | Writer, Animator, Director, Producer]
- 2014 Die Liebe in den Zeiten der EU [2D Short, Germany | Writer, Animator, Director, Co-Producer]
- 2013 Closer N' Closer [Music video, Nigeria, Germany | Scriptwriter, Director, Animator, Co-producer]
- 2012 Meine Heimat [2D Short, Nigeria, Germany | Writer, Animator, Director, Co-Producer]
- 2011 Footy My Love [An abstract on Chi-Chi Igbo, the Nigerian female football player]
- 2010 The Essence [2D Short, Nigeria, Germany | Animator, Director, Co-Producer]
- 2009 Anna Blume [2D Short, Germany, Bulgaria | Co-Writer, Animator, Co-Director, Producer]
- 2009 Patterns [2D Short, Nigeria, Germany | Writer, Animator, Director, Producer]
- 2008 Papermouse [2D Short, Nigeria, Germany | Writer, Animator, Director, Producer]
- 2007 The Lunatic [2D Short, Nigeria, Germany | Writer, Animator, Director, Co-Producer]
- 2004 Tag Attack - 05.00 mins. 2D animation. Ifs Cologne (co-director/animator)
- 2002 Once upon a dance - 04.00 mins. digital collage (director/animator)

== Selected solo exhibitions ==
- 2012 Tears of the Invisible - Organ kritischer Kunst, Berlin, Germany
- 2008 Nomadic Diaries - Zimt & Koriander Frankfurt am Main, Germany
- 2003 Between Territories - Galerie Haus 23 Cottbus, Germany
- 2002 Nomadic Diaries (A travelling pictorial storytelling) - Munich, Cologne, Halle; Germany & Neulengbach, Austria
- 2001 Woman about Women - Cologne Germany
- 1999 New Culture - Didi Museum, Lagos Nigeria
- 1998 Selected Paintings and Portraits in Oil - Lagos. Nigeria
- 1996 Realities - Didi Museum Lagos. Nigeria
- 1995 Storms of the Heart - National Museum, Lagos Nigeria

== Selected group exhibitions ==
- 1995 Mirrors of Society - National Museum, Lagos (Nigeria)
- 1996 Nigeria/China Co-operative exhibition, Lagos (Nigeria)
- 1996 Selected Nigerian artists as chosen by the National Gallery of Modern Art, Nigeria (South Korea)
- 1997 Small-Small Things - National Museum, Lagos (Nigeria)
- 1998 The Rape of Nature - Brazilian Embassy, Lagos (Nigeria)
- 2000 Threshold of Peace - African First-ladies' Peace-Summit exhibition, Abuja (Nigeria)
- 2001 Women about Women - Goethe Institut, Lagos (Nigeria)
- 2003 Ipade Begegnung - Afroasian Institute Gallery Vienna (Austria)
- 2004 Globalia - Frauenmuseum (Women's Museum), Bonn (Germany)
