= Ayodeji Awoyomi =

Nigerian fine art photographer

- Born: Ayodeji Oluwaseun Awoyomi; June 1, 1990 (age 36); Usi Ekiti
- Education: Ekiti State University
- Known for: Fine-art Photography
- Notable work: Spirit of David
- Style: Photography
- Awards: photographer of the year
- Website: www.ayodejiawoyomi.com

Signature
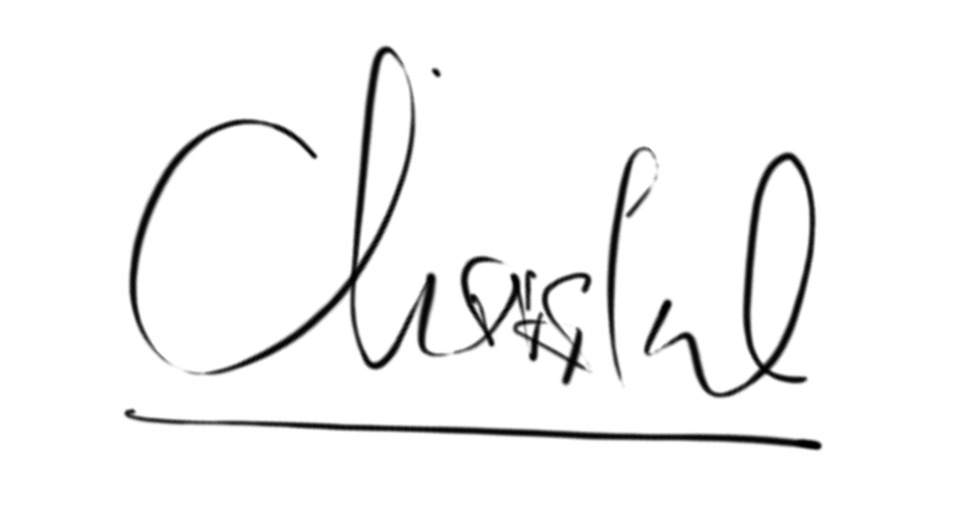

Ayodeji Oluwaseun Awoyomi (born 1 June 1990) is a Nigerian fine art photographer based in the United Kingdom. He became the first Nigerian to win the British Institute of Professional Photography's International Photographer of the Year award in 2024. His work has been featured in several international exhibitions and explores themes of identity, childhood, and cultural memory.

== Early life and education ==
Awoyomi was born in Usi-Ekiti, in the former Ondo State of Nigeria (now Ekiti State), studied geology at Ekiti State University, graduating with a bachelor's degree in 2016.

While at university, he was active in fashion modelling and participated in runway events such as GTBank Fashion Week and Lagos Fashion Week.

In an interview with The Photographer, a UK-based magazine, he stated that photography was a natural medium for him, describing his artistic drive as "embedded in [his] DNA" and citing a lifelong connection to the visual arts.

== Career ==
Awoyomi's work spans fine art and documentary photography, focusing on themes of identity, memory, and social narratives. His distinctive style blends creative expression with cultural storytelling, often highlighting African heritage and everyday life. He has exhibited in notable venues including the Lagos Photo Festival, Didi Museum (Lagos), and Madhouse Gallery at the University of Lagos.

Following his relocation to the United Kingdom, he co-founded Creative Meetup UK, an initiative with Abubakar Suleiman that connects Nigerian creatives across the UK.

In 2017, he served as the official photographer for the Deputy Governor of Ekiti State, Kolapo Olusola, contributing to his 2018 gubernatorial campaign imagery. In 2021, one of his artwork depicting children collecting water from a pond was used in a UNESCO campaign promoting clean water initiatives in Africa.

In 2022, the same photograph was featured in a World Economic Forum article covering the devastating floods in Nigeria, emphasizing environmental challenges linked to climate change.

In 2023, Awoyomi won the British Institute of Professional Photography's Student of the Year award, earning international recognition for his work.

In 2025 Awoyomi was featured in the Birmingham Open 25, a major exhibition showcasing contemporary artists in the city. selected alongside Cameroonian artist Ispahani Mukah as one of ten exhibiting artists and receiving the People's Choice Award through community open polls.

In a television interview with Channels TV, Awoyomi reflected on how the competition refined his visual approach, particularly his exploration of light and shadow in portraiture and identity-centered narratives. He noted that the exhibition broadened his international recognition while remaining deeply rooted in his African heritage and personal aesthetic philosophy.

Also in 2025, Awoyomi participated as a special contributor in "MENTALLY," a workshop organized by the Thought Pyramid Art Centre, focusing on mental health issues of artist in the visual arts sector. supporting creatives dealing with mental health challenges.

== Notable photographs ==
- In June 2021 Ayodeji photographed children fetching water in the pound for a UNESCO clean water campaign.
- In 2017, he photographed the deputy Governor of Ekiti Kolapo Olusola for his 2018 governorship campaign.

== Exhibitions ==
=== Solo exhibitions ===
- 2024 Testure, Lagos.

=== Group exhibitions ===
- Playful Perspectives, Madhouse Gallery, Lagos, 2024
- Print Masters, Birmingham, United Kingdom, 2023
- Waves: London Open Art, The Holy Art, London, 2024
- 171st Annual Open Entry, Royal West of England Academy, 2024
- PhotoNorth Festival, Leeds, 2024
- PhotoNorth Festival, Sheffield, 2023
- Urban Photo Arena, 2023
- Culture, Athens Photo Festival, Athens, 2023
- Water for Peace, World Water Day Photo Exhibition, Paris, 2023
- Celebrating Women, Tayese Academy of Arts and Culture, Bromley, London, 2025

=== Commissions ===
- Portrait of Britain, London
- The Tale of Childhood, Abuja
- Texture, RSBC, Birmingham

=== Collections ===
Awoyomi's work is included in the private collections of:

- Kolapo Olusola, former Deputy Governor of Ekiti State
- Atiku Abubakar, former Vice President of Nigeria
- Seyi Makinde, Governor of Oyo State

=== Award, Grant and scholarship ===
- BIPP Student Photographer of the Year, 2023
- Ultimate Prints Masters, New York, 2024
- Society of Photographers, London, 2023 & 2024
- Image 24, South Birmingham Photography Society, 2024
- Birmingham Open 25 People's Choice Award 2025
