= Lady Buckit and the Motley Mopsters =

2020 Nigerian animation film directed by Adebisi Adetayo

- Directed by: Adebisi Adetayo
- Screenplay by: Ayo Arigbabu
- Story by: Stanlee Ohikhuare
- Produced by: Blessing Amidu; Chris Ihidero
- Starring: Bimbo Akintola; Patrick Doyle; Bola Edwards; Kalu Ikeagwu; Casey Edema
- Music by: DJ Klem; Ava Momoh
- Production company: 32ad Animation Studio Hot Ticket Productions
- Release date: 11 December 2020
- Running time: 80 minutes
- Country: Nigeria
- Languages: Ijaw; Pidgin; Yoruba; English
- Budget: ₦400 million

Lady Buckit and the Motley Mopsters, known simply as LBMM, is a 2020 Nigerian computer-animated fantasy film. It was directed by Adebisi Adetayo from a story by Stanlee Ohikhuare and a screenplay by Ayo Arigbabu. The film stars Bimbo Akintola, Patrick Doyle, Bola Edwards and Kalu Ikeagwu in the lead roles. The film is also the first Nigerian cinematic feature-length animated film. The film production underwent several delays since 2017, But later had its exclusive special screening at the Genesis Cinemas in Lekki, Lagos on 5 December 2020. It had its theatrical release on 11 December 2020 and opened to mixed reviews from critics.

== Cast ==
- Bimbo Akintola as Iyabo Bozimo
- Patrick Doyle as Udume Bozimo
- Bola Edwards as Dustee
- Kalu Ikeagwu as Mr. Edwin
- Jessica Edwards as Bukky / Lady Buckit
- Simi Hassan
- Francis Sule as Cupsticks
- Gregory Ojefua as Health Inspector
- David Edwards as Tam
- Kelechi Udegbe as Health worker 2
- Casey Edema as Mopps
- Awazi Angbalaga as Pantylegs

== Synopsis ==
The plot revolves around a precocious young girl called Bukky who loves to assist her father enthusiastically to solve arithmetic and logic but easily gets on the nerves of her mother.

== Production ==
The production of the film was initially supposed to begin by 2017 but had been stalled at numerous occasions due to financial issues and lack of cohesion from initial production team. A film project titled SADE which was originally taunted to be the first Nigerian animated film was eventually shelved in 2018 due to financial tussles.

The film finally began its principal photography in November 2019 under Blessing's own production house Hot Ticket Productions. Around 30 cast and crew members were roped in for the production. 11 year old Jessica Edwards, 13 year old David Edwards and array of eight lead cast and six supporting cast who were part of those auditioned and cast were also roped in as dubbing artists/voice actors to play the characters. However, the film underwent further delays and derailment due to the COVID-19 pandemic in Nigeria and the resulting lockdowns in Lagos. The portions of the film's were mostly shot in Lagos amid regular power cuts. The film was animated in 3D at 4K resolution, at 24 frames per second for each cinematic effect. The film budget was estimated around ₦400 million.

== Soundtrack ==
A collection of 14 track original album and individual tracks were composed by Oluchi Odii, Patrick Edwards, Marilyn Mayaki, Ufuoma Iliaro, Casey Edema, Caleb Audu, DJ Klem and Ava Momoh.

== Awards and nominations ==
Year	Award	Category	Recipient	Result	Ref
2021	Africa Movie Academy Awards	Best Animation	Lady Buckit and the Motley Mopsters	Won	
2021	Annecy Festival	Out of Competition Official Selection	Lady Buckit and the Motley Mopsters		
2021	PAFF	Official Selection	Lady Buckit and the Motley Mopsters		
2021	Maoriland Festival	Official Selection	Lady Buckit and the Motley Mopsters		
2021	Animatiba	Official Selection	Lady Buckit and the Motley Mopsters		
2021	Afriff	Official Selection	Lady Buckit and the Motley Mopsters	Won	
2021	Nollywood Week Film Festival	Official Selection	Lady Buckit and the Motley Mopsters		
