= Olawunmi Banjo =

Nigerian artist

- Born: 31 July 1985 (age 41); Ogun, Nigeria
- Education: Pan African University
- Style: Pencil, charcoal, acrylic paint, oil painting

Olawunmi Banjo (born 31 July 1985) is a Nigerian artist. She currently lives and works in Lagos, Nigeria.

== Life ==
She was born in Ogun. Olawumni Banjo studied at the Pan African University.

She has deepened her artistic knowledge at the Aina Onabolu Modern Art in 2005, starting to paint with acrylic and oil in 2006.

Her works are made in pencil or charcoal and paints with acrylic paint or oil painting on canvas. Her art is explanatory, metalinguistic function, speaks for itself, so that the public can grasp the meaning of the works and appreciate it. She is inspired by nature, the people who surround her, past and present experiences and the works of other artists, especially of the Renaissance masters. Recently, her works are strongly influenced by the surrealist art movement.

Olawumni is also a member of the African Artists' Foundation.

== Exhibitions ==
- 2010 - Organizzato ed esposto alla sezione femminile del Send forth Exhibition per ambasciatore degli Stati Uniti in Nigeria, il Dr. Robin Renee Sanders, presso il Nike Centre for Art and Culture, Lekki a Lagos.
- 2010 - 50 @ 50: Nigerian Women, the Journey so far, Abuja. L'evento è stato organizzato dalla Women for change Initiative.
- 2009 Espone allo Ikoyi Club 1938 nella sezione "Art of Golf" organizzato da A.A.R.C.
- 2009 - Espone al 2 ° Salone Annuale d'Arte "Fyne ArtDiction" Southern Sun Hotel Ikoyi, Lagos.
- 2009 - Espone Championship Cup, Ikoyi Club 1938, Lagos.
- 2009 - Esposto alla Fadan Fashion show, Lagos Civic Center. 2009.
- 2008 - Espone al 17 ° “Nigeria 2008 Art show and Art competition “Nigerian(s) At Work” organizzato dall'African Art Resource Center (AARC). National Museum, Onikan, Lagos. Vincendo il secondo posto
- 2008 - Espone al "The Nigerian Cup" Golf Tournament, Ikoyi Club 1938, Golf Section..
- 2008 - Partecipa alla ” Annual Art Exhibition ITA Foundation “Serendipity” at the Didi Museum. Victoria Island, Lagos.
- 2008 - Partecipa alla 4 ° posto alla Annual All Female Art Exhibition (Wiva Perspective), National Museum, Onikan Lagos. 2008.
- 2008 - partecipa 2 °Annual Art Exhibition “Beyond Imagination” Multimedia foundation of Artists. National Gallery of Art. Aina Onabolu Modern Art, Igamu Lagos.
- 2008 Partecipa al NAIJAZZ 2008 NAIJART Art Exhibition at Studio 868 Bishop Aboyade Cole.
- 2008 - Espone Eden fashion show at Didi Museum. Victoria Island, Lagos.
- 2008 - Espone al primo Art Expo Nigeria at the National Museum, Onikan Lagos.
- 2008 - partecipa a un workshop di graffiti (Lagos on my mind), organizzato e sostenuto dalla African Artists Foundation and British council “WAPI”
- 2008 - Partecipa a un workshop di graffiti alla 54 Raymond Njoku street Ikoyi; - Studio 868 Aboyade Cole; - 10th Lagos Book and Art Festival Exhibition at National Theatre, Iganmu, Lagos.

== See also ==
- Arte contemporanea africana
