= Isaac Emokpae =

Nigerian visual artist (born 1977)

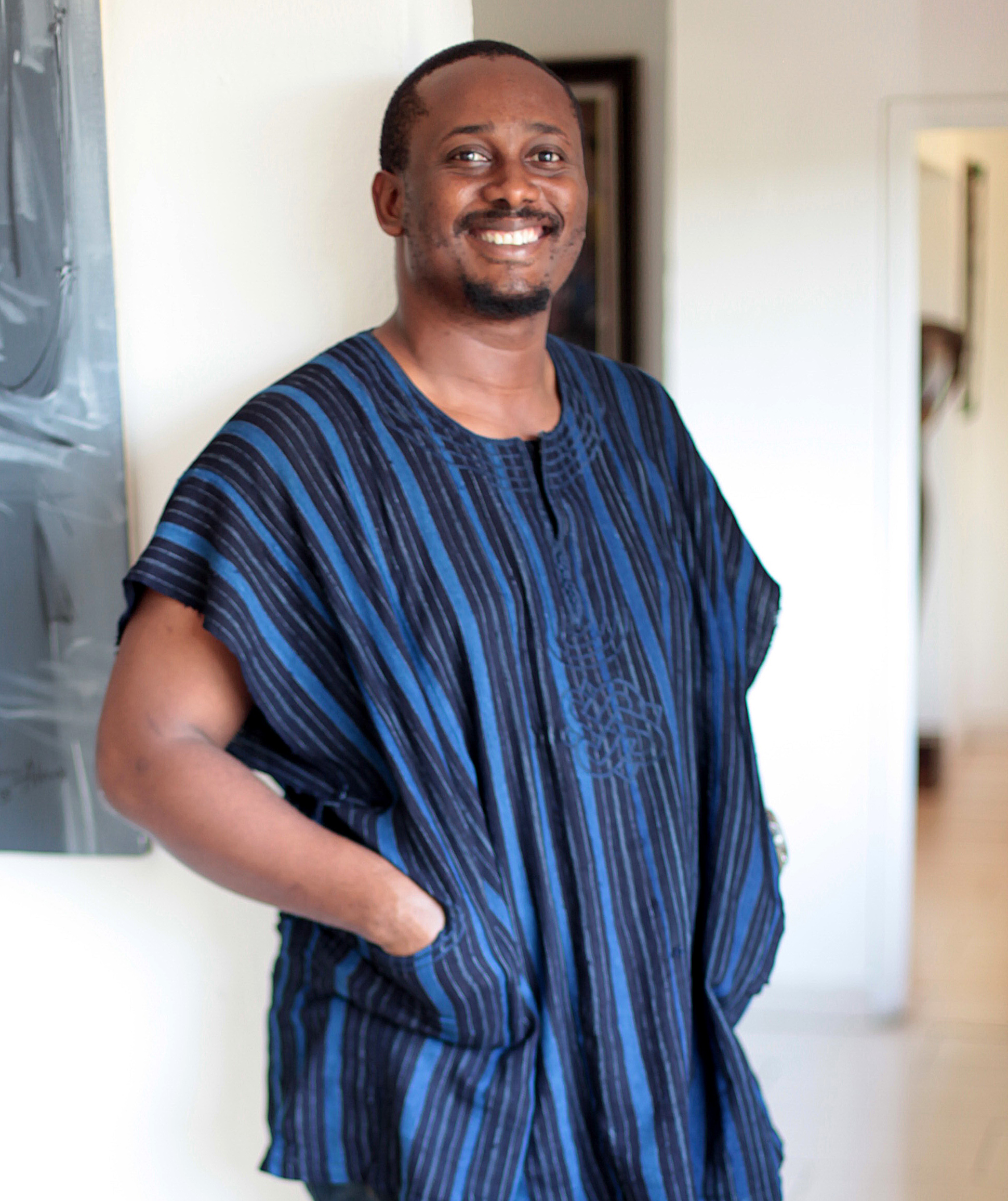
- Born: Isaac Iken Ismahil Ọláminíyì Erhabor Ogieva Emokpae; November 5, 1977; Lagos, Nigeria
- Other names: Iken Erhabor-Emokpae, Isaac Erhabor Emokpae, Iken Emokpae
- Education: University of Lagos
- Occupations: Photographer, painter, visual artist
- Parent: Erhabor Emokpae

Isaac Emokpae (born Isaac Iken Ismahil Ọláminíyì Erhabor Ogieva Emokpae on November 5, 1977) is a Nigerian visual artist, painter, and photographer. His work is defined by duality and is known for its expressionist and surrealist features.

== Biography and work ==
Emokpae has a BA in Creative Arts at the University of Lagos (2005), studying under the guidance of Professor Abayomi Barber but made his mark in the Nigerian creative scene first, most notably, as a photographer. He workedfor a while in fashion photography and journalistic photography, making a significant mark in the field to have been once regarded as a "veteran". His photographs have been used in Forbes magazine among other places.

His paintings and visual art are peculiar in their focus on duality and their root the style of Abstract Expressionism. His work have been exhibited in Nigeria and around the world.

Emokpae is the third son of Erhabor Emokpae, notable Nigerian painter and sculptor popularly regarded as one of the pioneers of modern arts in Nigeria. Like his father, Emokpae strongly "combines his poetic depth with artistic flair"

He is said to be inspired by the philosophies of Leibniz, Descartes and Santayana.

== Selected exhibitions ==
Nigeria Imaginary - MOWAA (Museum of West African Art), Benin City, Edo state. (2025)Nigeria Imaginary at MOWAA

- Transparent - Rele Art Gallery, Onikan, Lagos. (2017)
- Strip - Rele Art Gallery, Onikan, Lagos (2015)
- Duality - The Wheat Baker, Ikoyi, Lagos (2014)
- Reconstruction in Reverse - Omenka Gallery, Ikoyi, Lagos (2010).
- Genesis (Solo exhibition), Terra Kulture, VI, Lagos (2005)
- Signs of the Times, Didi Museum, Lagos – (2000), Salon Event, Bungalow, VI, Lagos (2004)
- Abayomi Barber Honorary Exhibition (Group Exhibition) at Faculty of Arts, University of Lagos, Nigeria. (2002)
- CCIC VI Artists (Group Exhibition) at Didi Museum, Lagos, Nigeria. (2000)
- Exchange of Our Treasures (Group Exhibition) at UNESCO, Troyes, France. (1996/97)
- Peace on Earth/Save our Earth (Group Exhibition) at Lions Group, Ilorin, Nigeria. (1990)

== Awards ==
- 2007 – Hasselblad Masters, Semi-finalist.
- 1996 – UNESCO Exchange Our Treasures Art Competition.
