= Ekiti State University =

Public university in Ado-Ekiti, Nigeria

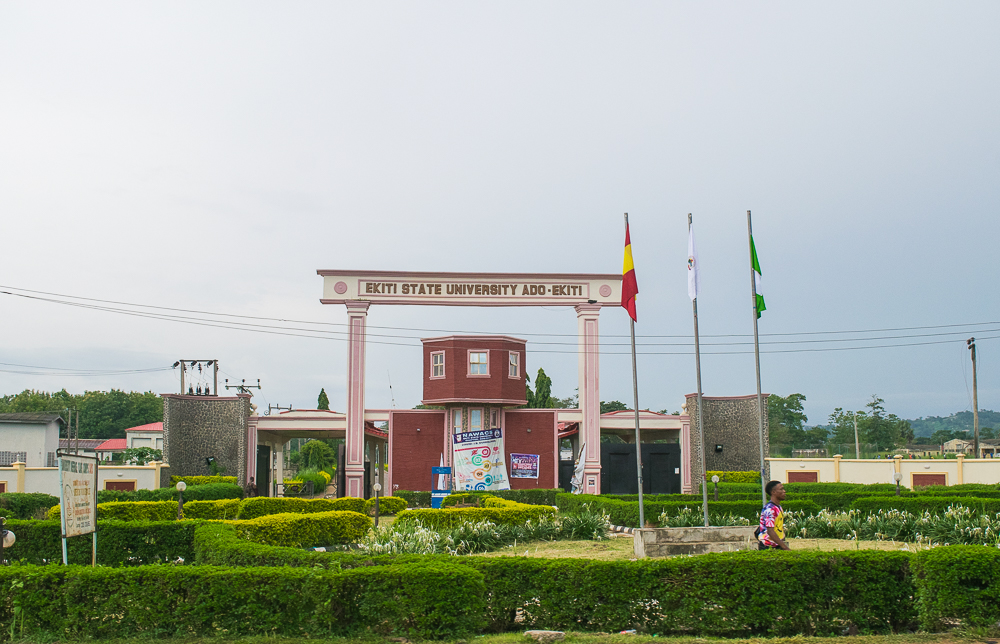
- Former names: Obafemi Awolowo University (1982–1985); Ondo State University (1985–1999); University of Ado-Ekiti (1999–2011); Ekiti State University (2011–present)
- Type: State-owned University
- Established: 1982
- Chairman: Professor Bamitale Omole
- Vice-Chancellor: Professor Professor Joseph Babatola Ayodele, Bayode Isaiah Popoola
- Students: 27,000
- Undergraduates: 23,000
- Postgraduates: 2,000
- Location: Ado Ekiti, Ekiti, Nigeria; 7.712°N 5.251°E
- Campus: Urban
- Website: www.eksu.edu.ng

Ekiti State University Ado Ekiti is a state government-owned and -operated Nigerian university, located in Ado Ekiti, Ekiti State, Nigeria. It was established as Obafemi Awolowo University, Ado-Ekiti on 30 March 1982 by the administration of Chief Michael Adekunle Ajasin, the first civilian governor of Ondo State. The university is a member of the Association of Commonwealth Universities.

Ekiti State University, Ado-Ekiti, as it is known today, is the only university in Nigeria that has within a quarter of a century had its name changed four times. The name was changed to Ondo State University in 1985, University of Ado-Ekiti in November 1999, and to its present name Ekiti State University of Ado Ekiti in September 2011. It was ranked 3rd best state university in Nigeria in 2021 by webometrics.

== Brief history ==
=== Creation ===
On 14 January 1981, Chief Adekunle Ajasin-led civilian government of Ondo State, announced its intent to establish a multi-campus university in the state and a 16-member planning committee was set up. The outcome of the exercise led to the founding of the university in March 1982, when the state government created a university named Obafemi Awolowo University, Ado-Ekiti and appointed Prof. I.O. Oladapo as the first vice-chancellor with the composition of the first council headed by Chief B.A. Ajayi and Adeyemi Sultan on 28 March 1982.

The university started off in a modest way from an old catering rest house in Akure and moved to a temporary site in Ado-Ekiti where lectures started soon after with 136 students spread across the Faculties of Arts, Science and Social Sciences. During the 1983/84 session, new courses were established to strengthen the existing faculties; these included geology, biology, chemistry, French, Yoruba studies, philosophy, religious studies, political science and psychology. A fourth faculty, the Faculty of Education, was established in 1983/84 session increasing the student population to 724. In the 1985/86 session, the Faculty of Engineering (Civil, Mechanical and Electrical) and a Department of Banking and Finance were established. The Faculty of Law was established during the 1991/92 session and the Faculty of Agricultural Sciences was established in 2001, bringing the Faculties to 8 in total and a student population of 10,000. The student population is now in excess of 25,000 spread across the various academic programmes.

Today the university is running degree programmes in at least 66 fields of academic specialisations across the existing faculties and academic programmes, from the School of Postgraduate Studies, Directorate of Continuing Education, Directorate of Part Time Programme, Directorate of Sandwich Education Degree Programme, Affiliate Colleges, Institute of Education, Institute of Science Laboratory Technology, Directorate of Pre-Degree Programmes, General Studies Unit, Centre for Entrepreneurial Studies and the Centre for Research and Development, among others. The faculties have increased from 8 in 2001 to 10 in 2010 with the creation of the College of Medicine which houses the Faculty of Basic Medical Sciences and Faculty of Clinical Sciences while making use of the Ekiti State Teaching Hospital Complex, Ado-Ekiti.

=== Change of name ===
In 1984, the ownership of the university came under the military administration of Ondo State since the governance of the country came under the military junta. In 1985, the government as proprietor of the university cancelled the multi-campus and non-residential policy of the university and changed the name to Ondo State University, Ado-Ekiti. (The change of the University's name did not affect the site/location of the campus at Ado-Ekiti, Nigeria. Reference can be made in records of the National Universities Commission (Nigeria), Association of Commonwealth Universities and other public records.)

=== Impact of political change on the university ownership and name ===
In 1996, the Federal Military Government of Nigeria created 6 additional new states to the existing 30 states of the Nigerian Federation. Ekiti State of Nigeria was one of the 6 new states and it was carved out of the Ondo State which was created earlier in 1976 out of defunct Western State of Nigeria. Due to the state creation, economic assets, institutions and establishments previously owned by the Ondo State were shared with the new Ekiti State. Hence, the ownership and proprietorship of the Ondo State University, Ado-Ekiti came under the joint administration of the Governments of Ekiti State and the Ondo State.

In 1998, due to a collapse of agreements on asset sharing and running of the Ondo State University, Ado-Ekiti between the governments of Ondo and Ekiti States, the government of Ondo State created a new university named Ondo State University at Akungba Akoko, in Ondo State (The Ondo State University, Akungba Akoko was later renamed Adekunle Ajasin University, Akungba Akoko while the Ondo State Government also created Ondo State University of Science and Technology at Okitipupa in 2003).

In view of the policy decisions taken by the Ondo government, the government of Ekiti State took over the ownership, administrative control and funding of the Ondo State University at Ado-Ekiti and enacted a law to rename it the University of Ado-Ekiti. The Ekiti government also took steps to ensure that all records and properties of the university remained intact. By law, the Ekiti State Government transferred all assets, liabilities and records of the Ondo State University, Ado-Ekiti to University of Ado-Ekiti, and the National Universities Commission was informed of the change.

=== Political Developments in Ekiti State (2007–2011) and its impact ===
In 2007, a new civilian Government was installed in Ekiti State. The Government established two new state-owned Universities, in addition to the existing University of Ado-Ekiti. The names of the two Universities were The University of Education, Ikere-Ekiti and The University of Science and Technology, Ifaki-Ekiti. These two Universities, along with the existing University of Ado-Ekiti, Nigeria, were funded from the public treasury; this took a great toll on the public purse and led to the polarisation of the educational system.

In 2010, there was a change of government in Ekiti and the new government convened a statewide education summit in 2011 to consider the best ways to sustain tertiary education and to fund public institutions owned by the government of Ekiti State. Part of the decisions taken at the summit were to merge the three state-owned universities as a single public institution. The Ekiti government by law merged the University of Ado-Ekiti, the University of Education, and the University of Science and Technology, into a new university named Ekiti University. Subsequently, the National Universities Commission in Abuja licensed the University consolidating all the assets and records of the three universities as one institution.

In the last 30 years, philanthropists have maduniversity uhtions to the physical development of the university such as Dr. Lawrence Omolayo who donated the administrative block consisting of 271 offices, Aare Afe Babalola (Senior Advocate of Nigeria), constructed and furnished a 350-seat law auditorium, Dr. Ahmed Aliyu Mustapha built a 400-seat lecture theatre while Ado-Ekiti community built the administrative block for the Faculty of Law. The Kole Ajayi led Alumni Association built an alumni centre for the university in 2002 while the Dr. Jadesola Babatola led alumni association constructed the Faculty of Law Moot and Trial Court in 2009. The Education Trust Fund constructed a 1,200–seat and a 750–seat lecture theatre, a new library complex, the Faculty of Agricultural Sciences office complex, new Faculties of Social Sciences, Arts and Education offices. Shell Petroleum recently established an information communication technology centre in the university apart from the donations of National Universities Commission virtual library and Access Education which also donated computers and server to the University.

A large number of the programmes of the university now enjoy accreditation while some enjoy interim accreditation. Almost all the university's academic activities are linked to one on-line facility or the other. The university is undergoing an institutional accreditation exercise as a selected institution in southwest Nigeria. The council of the University also recently set-up an endowment fund for indigent but brilliant students with an initial contribution of N1million pointing out that the problem of indigency has become real in the university because of the poor economic situation and the rising cost of University education.

The university has a limited number of residential and sports facilities for staff and students within and outside the main Campus.

== Administration ==
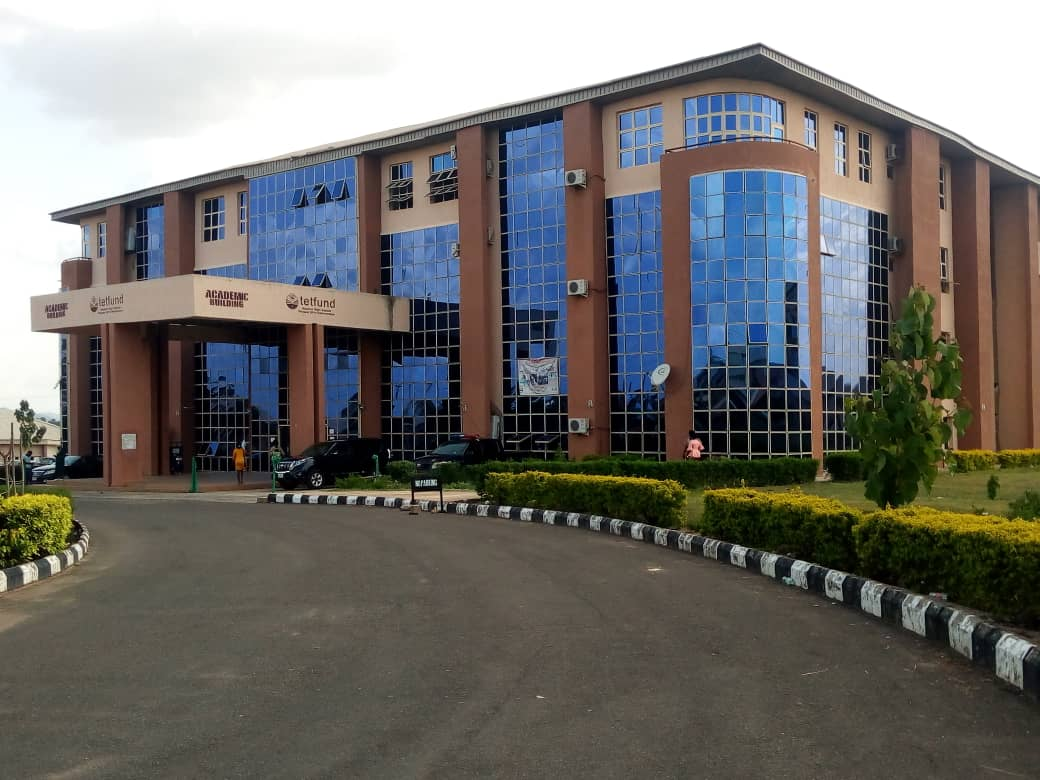
Ekiti State University Senate Building

The following are some of the principal members of the University administration:

- Visitor
  - Biodun Oyebanji, Executive Governor, Ekiti State of Nigeria
- Chancellor
  - HRH Alhaji Lamido Sanusi, former Emir of Kano
- Pro-Chancellor and Chairman of Council
  - Prof. Bamitale Omole
- Vice-Chancellor
  - Prof Edward Olanipekun

== Faculties and colleges ==
- Agricultural Science
- Arts
- Basic Medical Sciences
- Clinical Sciences
- Education
- Petroleum
- Engineering
- Law
- Management Science
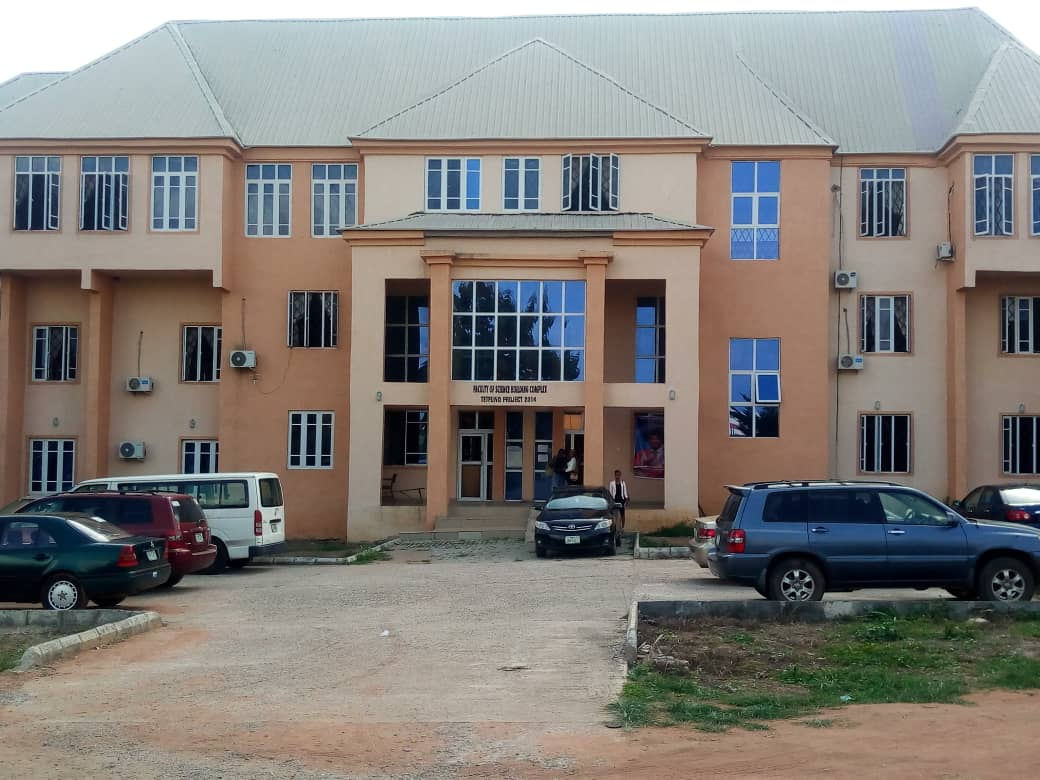
- The New Faculty of Science Building Ekiti State University
  Science
- Social Sciences

== Units ==
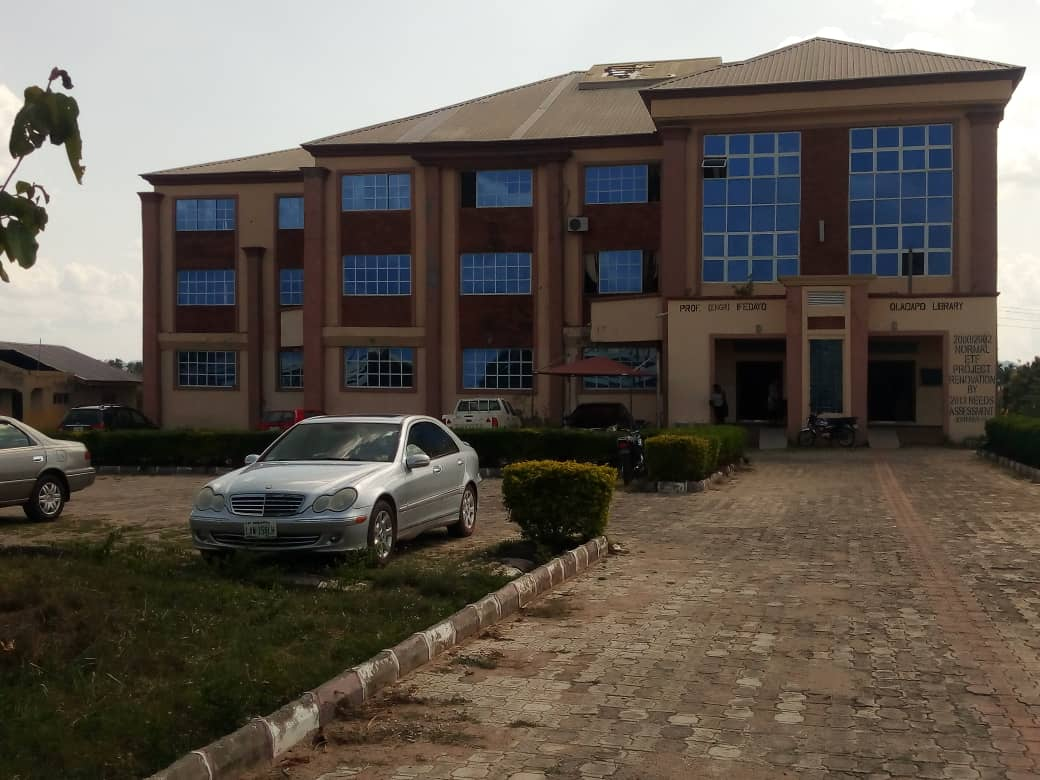
- A picture of Ifedayo Oladayo Library of Ekiti State University.
  The Sports Centre
- The Library
- The ICT Centre
- The University Press
- The Botanical Garden
- The University Farm
- The University Health Services
- The Institute of Education
- The Institute of Science Laboratory Technology
- The Entrepreneurial Development Centre
- The Research and Development Centre
- The School of Postgraduate Studies
- The Part Time Programme
- The Sandwich Programme
- The Pre-Degree Programme
- The affiliate colleges

== Halls of residence ==
The university is partially residential, with halls of residence for both male and female students. Private hostels are run off-campus adjacent to the university and in the university town by respective owners. There is also provision for accommodation of limited number of students, the halls are listed below:

- Satellite Hostel (mixed)
- Ajasin/Abiola hostel (female) Solely female hostel comprises two blocks located very close to the Faculty of Education and Art.
- Government Hostel (AKA Tatan, mixed) comprises four Hall of residence A, B, C and D. Block A and B are Male Hostels while Block C and D are female hostels.
- School Gate hostel (mixed)
- Iworoko Hostel (mixed)
- Osekita Hostel (mixed)
- Omolayo Hostel (mixed)
- Anglican Hostel (female)

== Affiliate institutions ==
Below are a list of affiliate institutions of the Ekiti State University approved by the National Universities Commission (NUC).

- Michael Otedola College of Primary Education, Noforija Epe Lagos
- International School of Management (ISM) Lagos
- Emmanuel Alayande College of Education, Oyo
- Kwara State College of Education, Oro
- Kwara State College of Education, Ilorin
- Adeniran Ogunsanya College of Education Otto, Ijanikin, Lagos
- Crestfield College Of Education, Erin-Osun, Osun State

== Notable alumni ==
- Dapo Abiodun, Governor of Ogun state
- Chukwuemeka Fred Agbata, technology entrepreneur and presenter at Channels TV.
- Kunle Ajayi, Professor of Political Science and Conflict Management at the university
- Ayodeji Awoyomi, award winning fine art photographer.
- Praise Fowowe, Nigerian author and speaker
- Adetola Juyitan, Former president of Junior Chamber International, Nigeria
- Joshua Kayode, Professor of Plant Science at the university

== Gallery of Institutional infrastructures ==
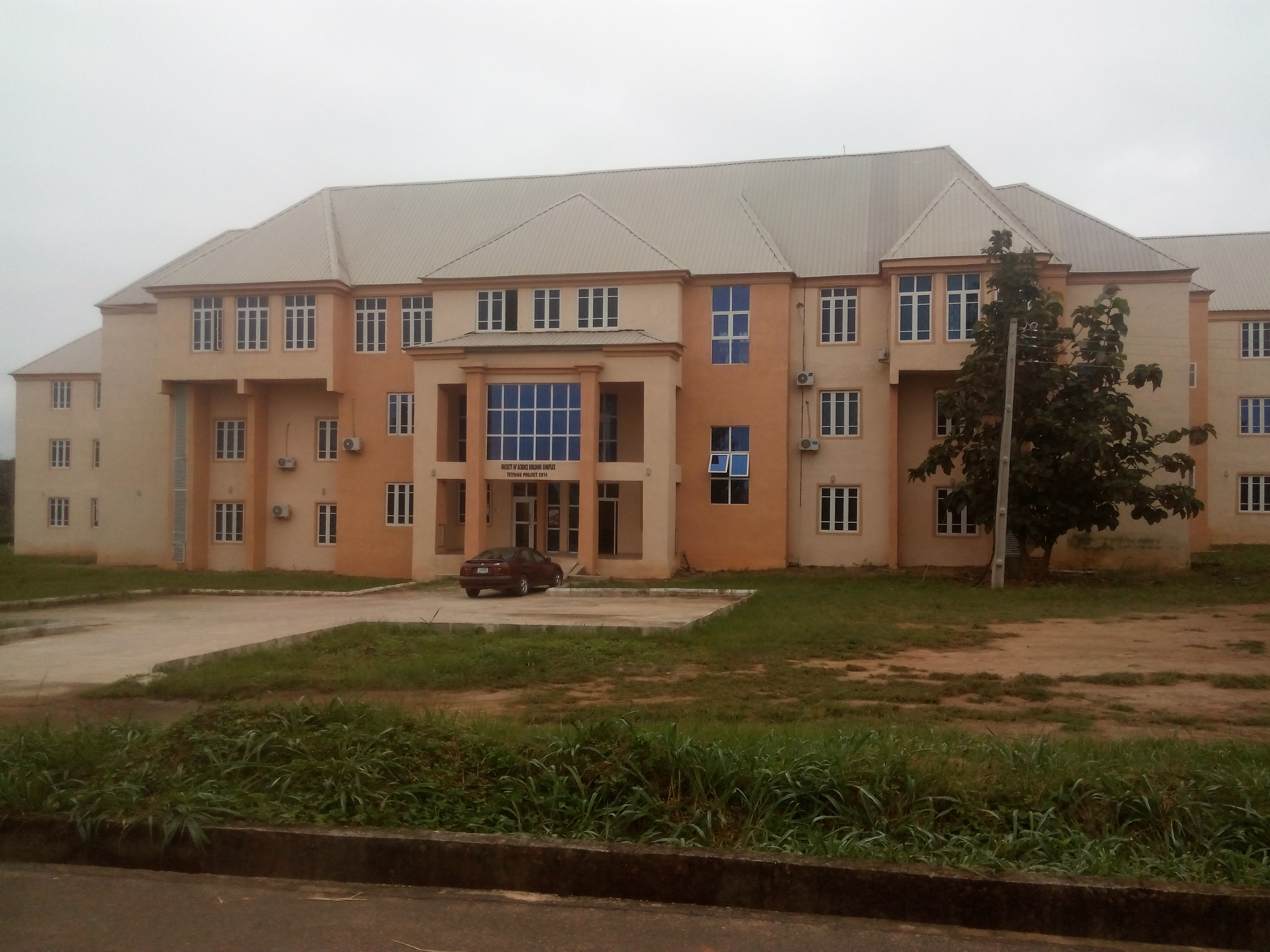
Faculty of Science Building Complex

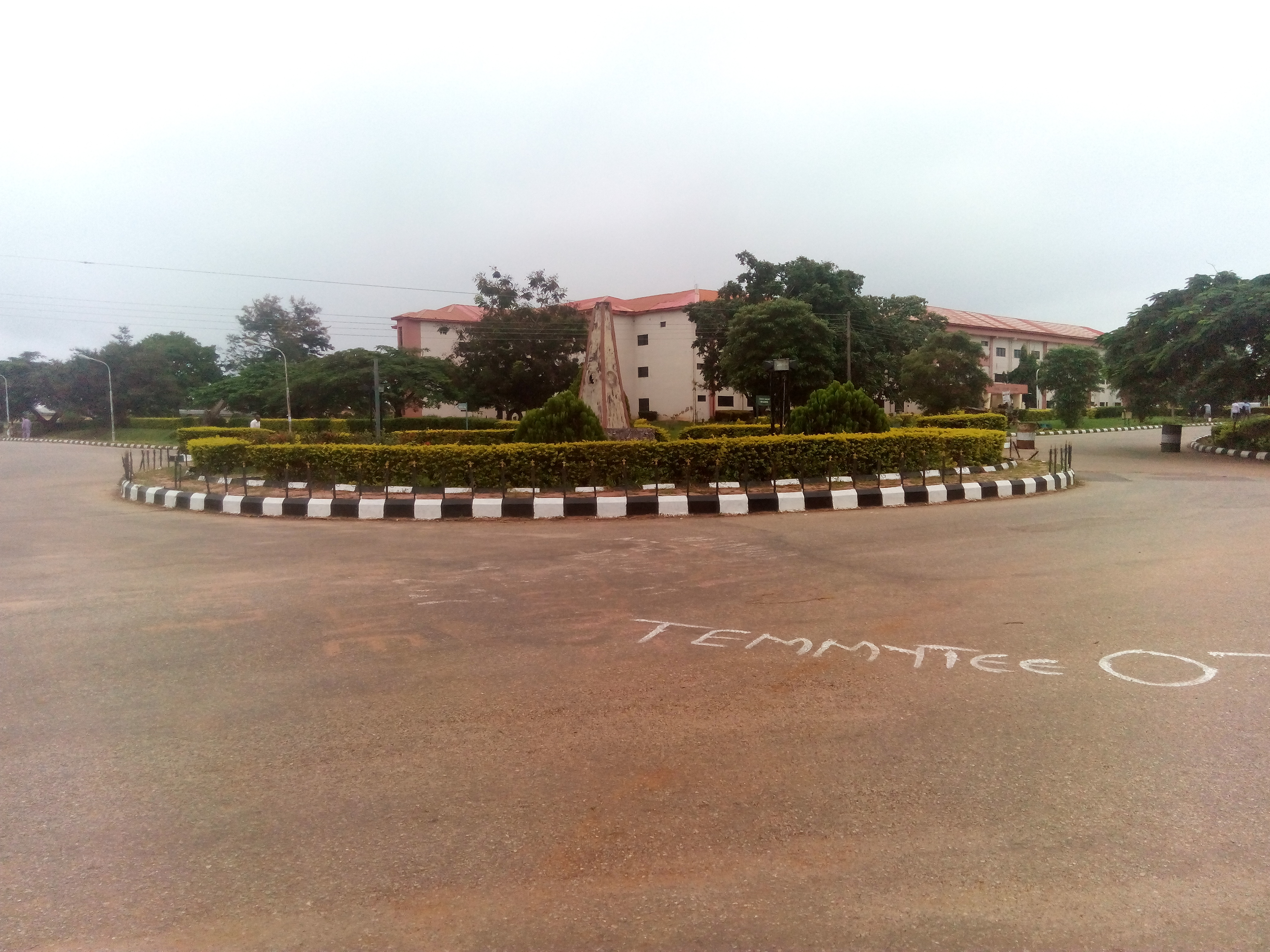
Main Round-about

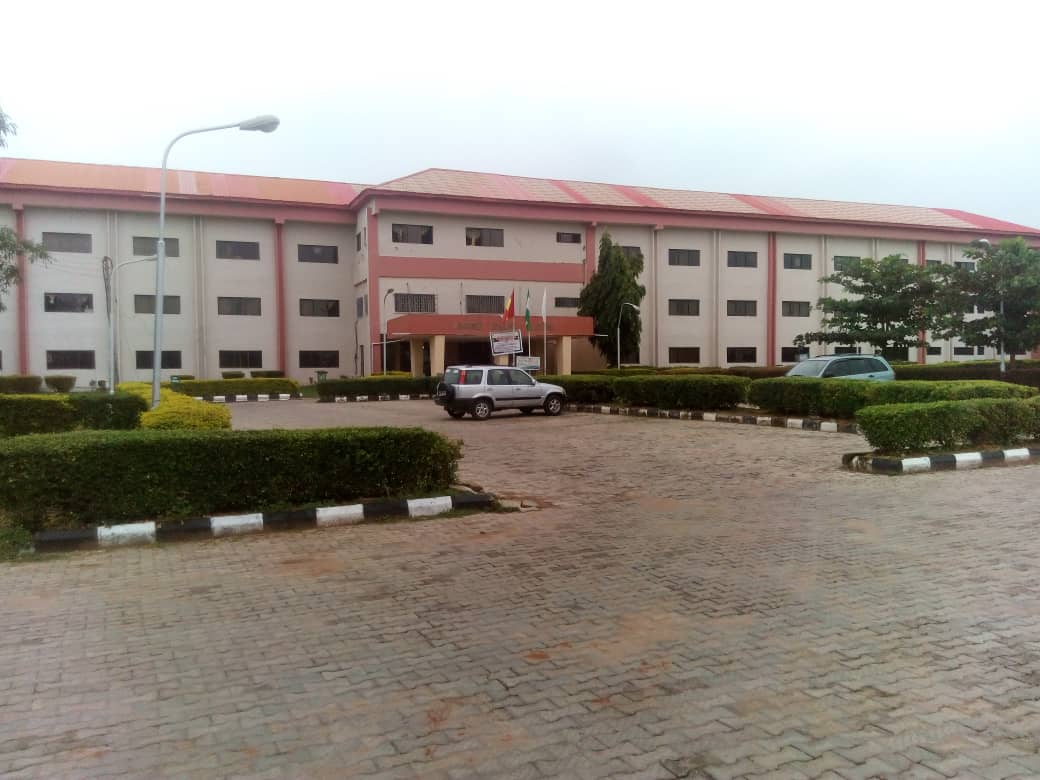
Lawrence Omolayo Building

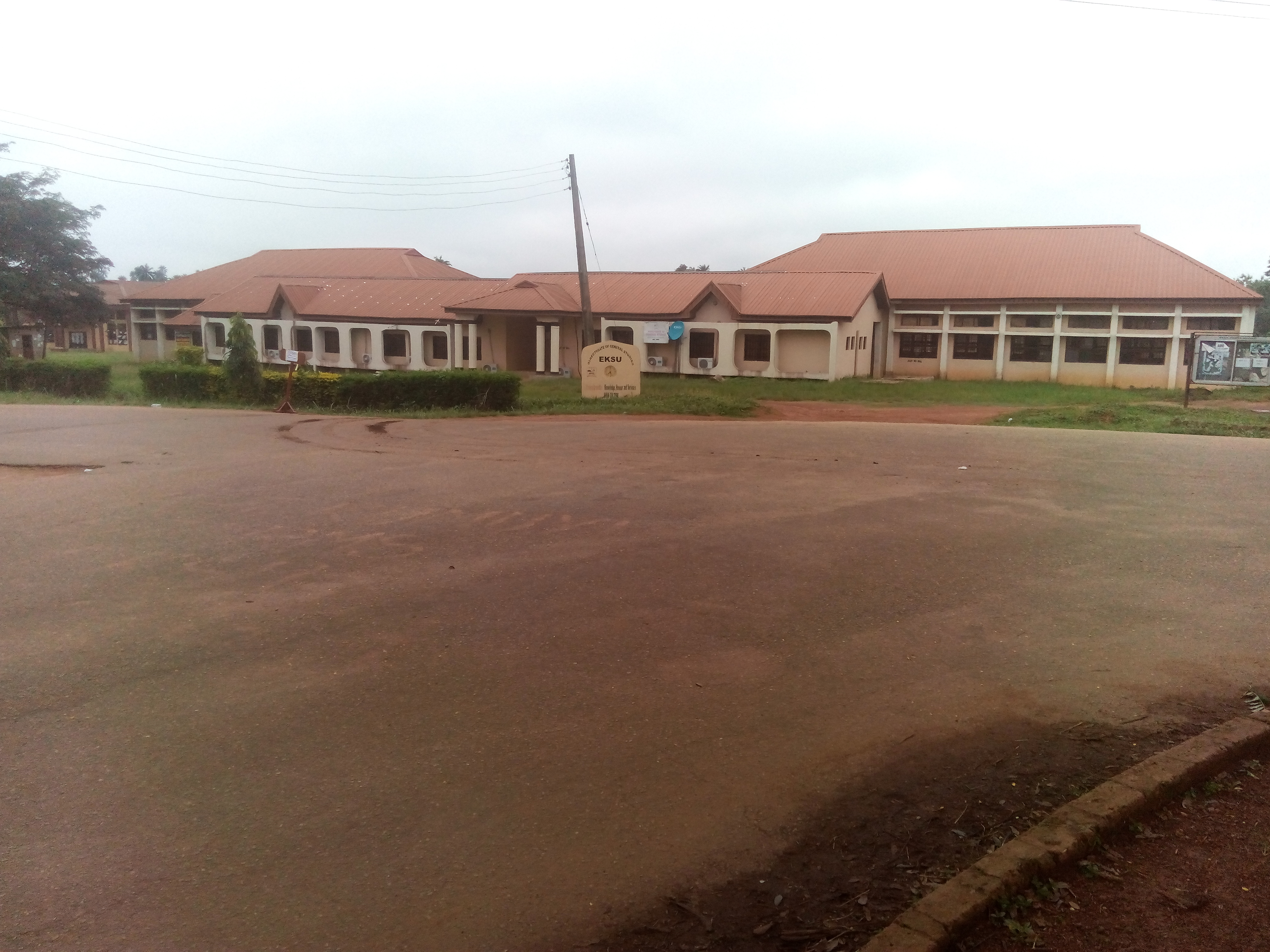
Directorate of General Studies

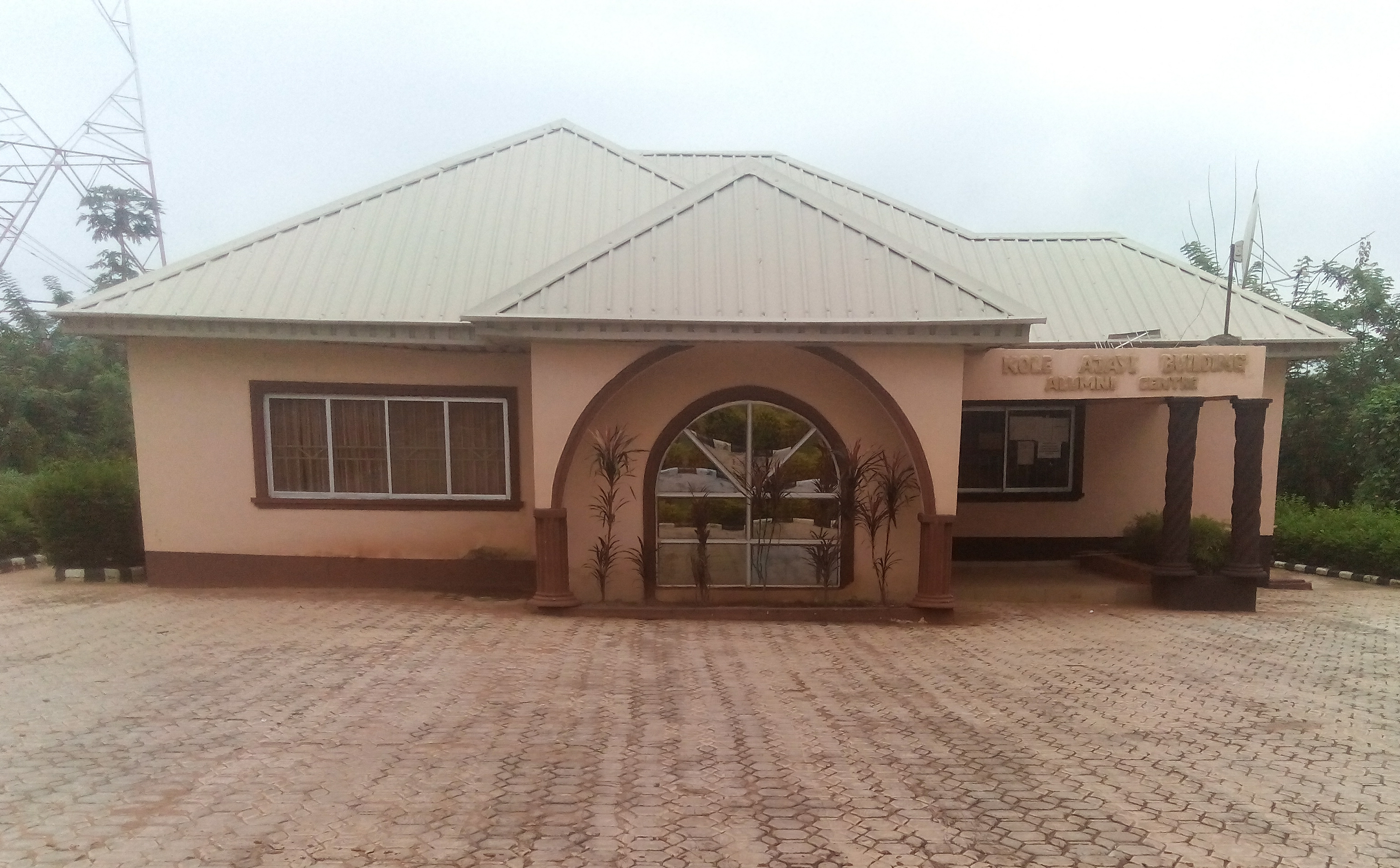
Kole Ajayi Building, Alumni Centre

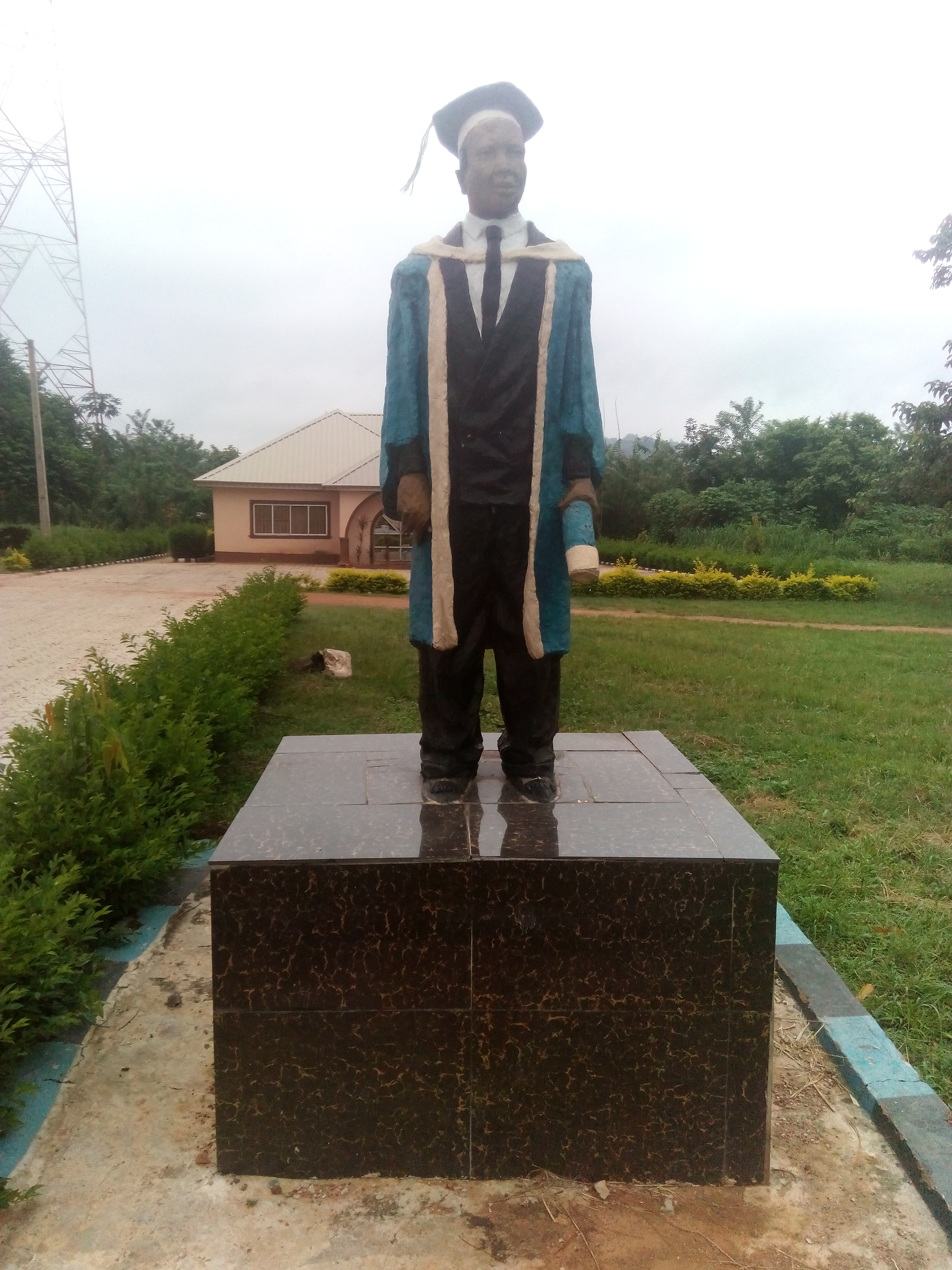
Alumni Sculpture

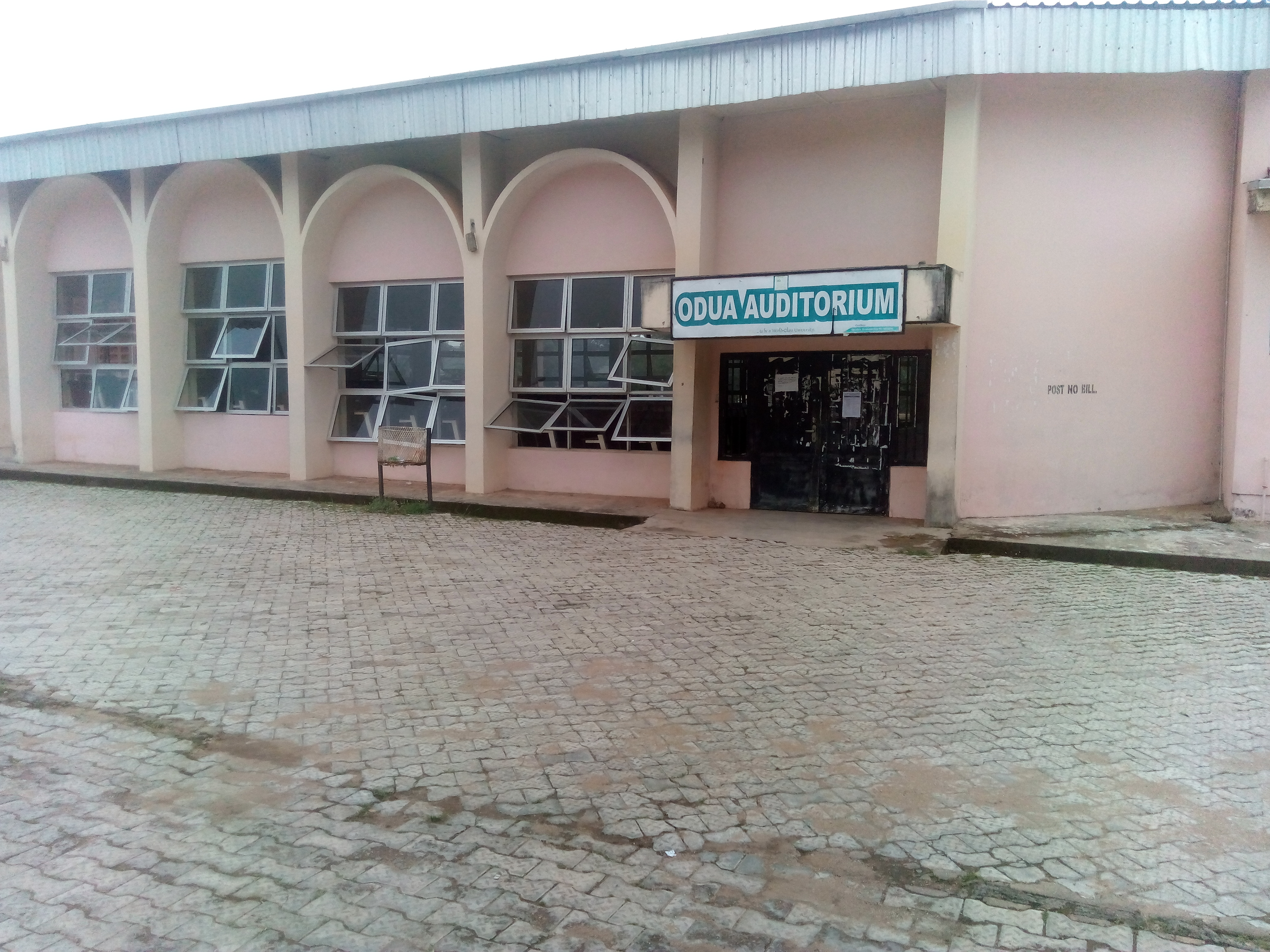
Main Auditorium

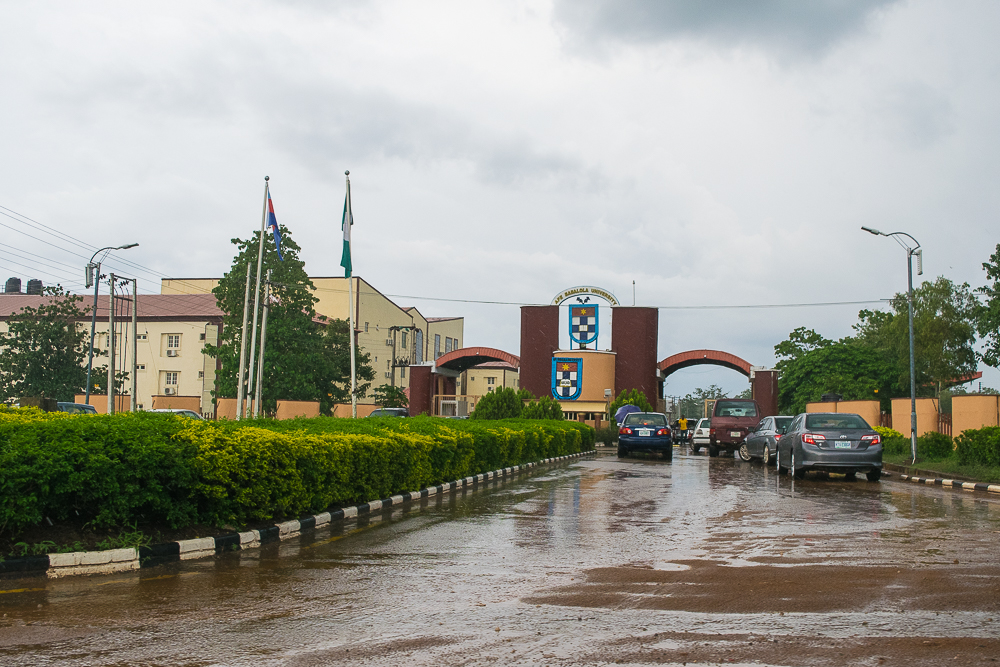
Ekiti State University Main Gate

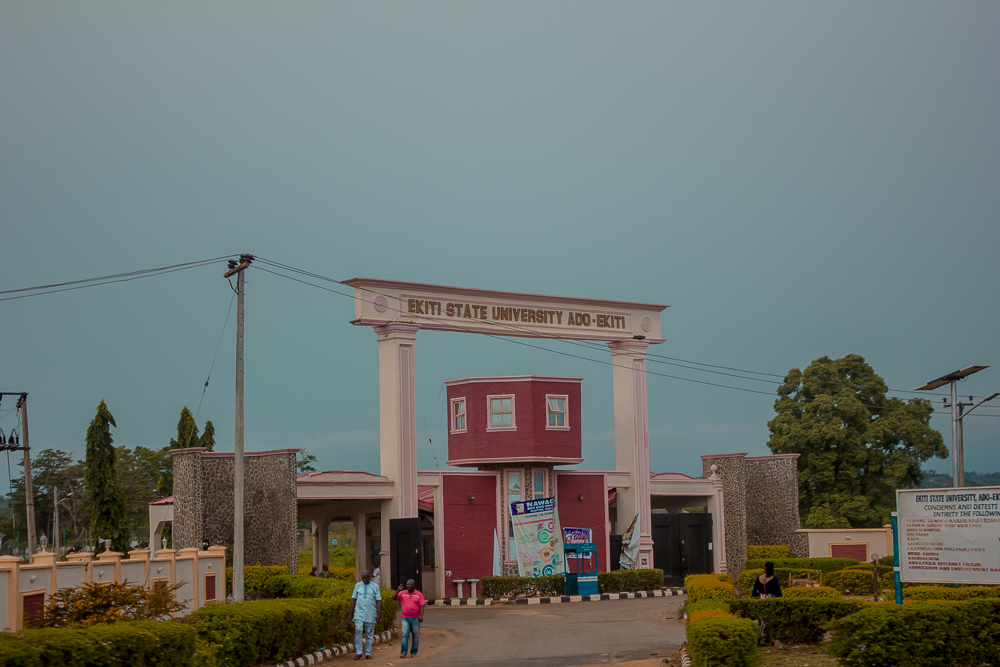
Ekiti state university ado ekiti

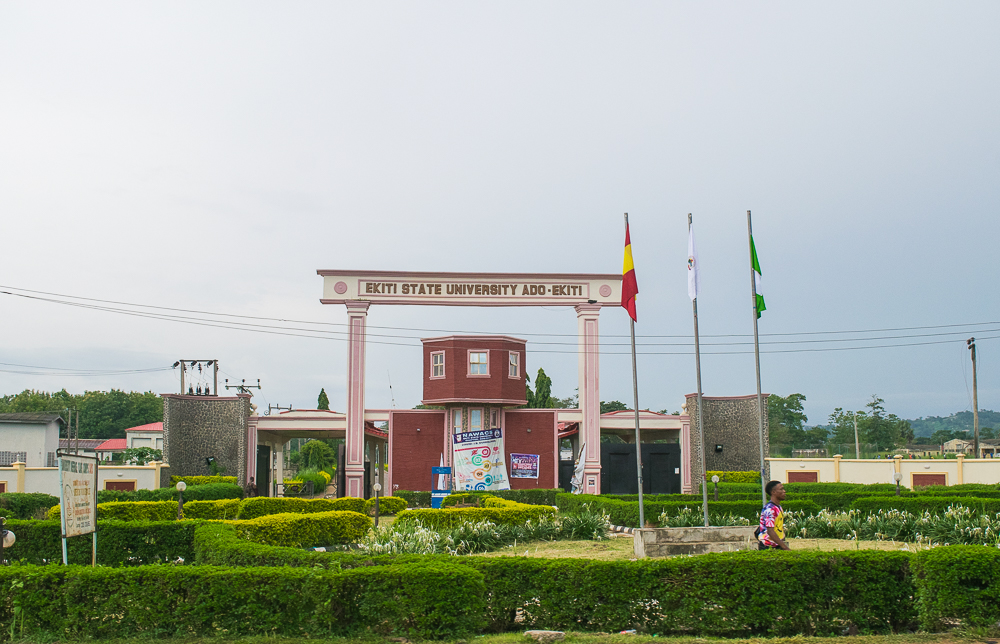
Ekiti state University gate, Ado-ekiti

== Security incidents ==
In April 2026, the body of a young man believed to be a recent graduate returning to complete clearance processes was found in a bush path near the Lakers Hostel area in Osekita, close to the Ekiti State University campus, sparking panic and safety concerns among students.
