= Ebele the flutist =

Ebele the Flutist
- Born: Ebele Ezeamakam
- Origin: Anambra State, Nigeria
- Genres: Gospel
- Occupations: Songwriter, composer
- Instrument: Flute
- Years active: 2009 – present

Ebele Ezeamakam, known as Ebele the flutist, the first Nigerian professional female flutist.

== Career ==
Ezeamakam's passion for the flute started at 14 years old. She has released an official single co-written by Cobhams Asuquo titled, "Dreams Come True".

== Discography ==
=== Selected singles ===
- "Jawa Chineke" (2009)
- "If You Don't Know" (2011)
- "Oghama"(2014)
- "Dream Come True" (2015)

== Awards and nominations ==
| Award | Category | Result | Ref |
|---|---|---|---|
| Inspirational Women's Award | Best Use of Instruments | Won | |
| Classic African Merit Awards | First Female Flutist in Nigeria | Won | |
| Crystal Awards | Best Use of Instruments | Nominated | |
| Nigerian Gospel Music Video Awards | Best Jazz Music Video | Nominated | |
| Nigerian Gospel Music Video Awards | Best Use of Instrument | Nominated | |
