= May Ellen Mofe-Damijo =

Nigerian journalist and writer (1956–1996)

May Ellen Ezekial Mofe-Damijo (1956 – 23 March 1996), or MEE was a Nigerian journalist and writer who was the publisher of Classique magazine, a celebrity and entertainment journal that has ceased publication. The magazine employed journalists such as Dele Momodu, Ben Charles Obi, and Rudolf Okonkwo.

Mofe-Damijo also wrote a few books including Dream Maker and Center Spread.

Mofe-Damijo was born in Takoradi, Ghana to Owogbenu and Victoria Ezekiel. Between 1982 and 1984, she worked as a journalist for Sunday Concord. In 1985, she was an assistant editor for Newswatch and two years later, she became Editor of Quality magazine which has now ceased operation. She produced and hosted a television talk show Mee and You on NTA 2 channel 5, Lagos before her death in 1996. After her first marriage which did not last, she married Richard Mofe-Damijo, a Nigerian actor. She had a daughter named Nichole Onome from her previous marriage.

She died following complications that arose after a surgery on her to remove fibroid. She had two surgeries earlier also to remove fibroid. This led to a second surgery, on the 23 March 1996, which led to her death, aged 39 or 40.

== Books ==
- Ezekiel, May Ellen (1989). Centerspread. Lagos: A Mee Publication. ISBN 9789783061712.
- Ezekiel, May Ellen (1988). Dreammaker (Second reprint. ed.). [Nigeria: s.n. ISBN 9783061704.
- Mofe-Damijo, Mee (1990). Wind songs : a collection from Nigeria's number one columnist. Lagos, Nigeria: A Mee Publication. ISBN 9783061720.
