= Gbolahan Ayoola =

Nigerian painter and sculptor (born 1977)

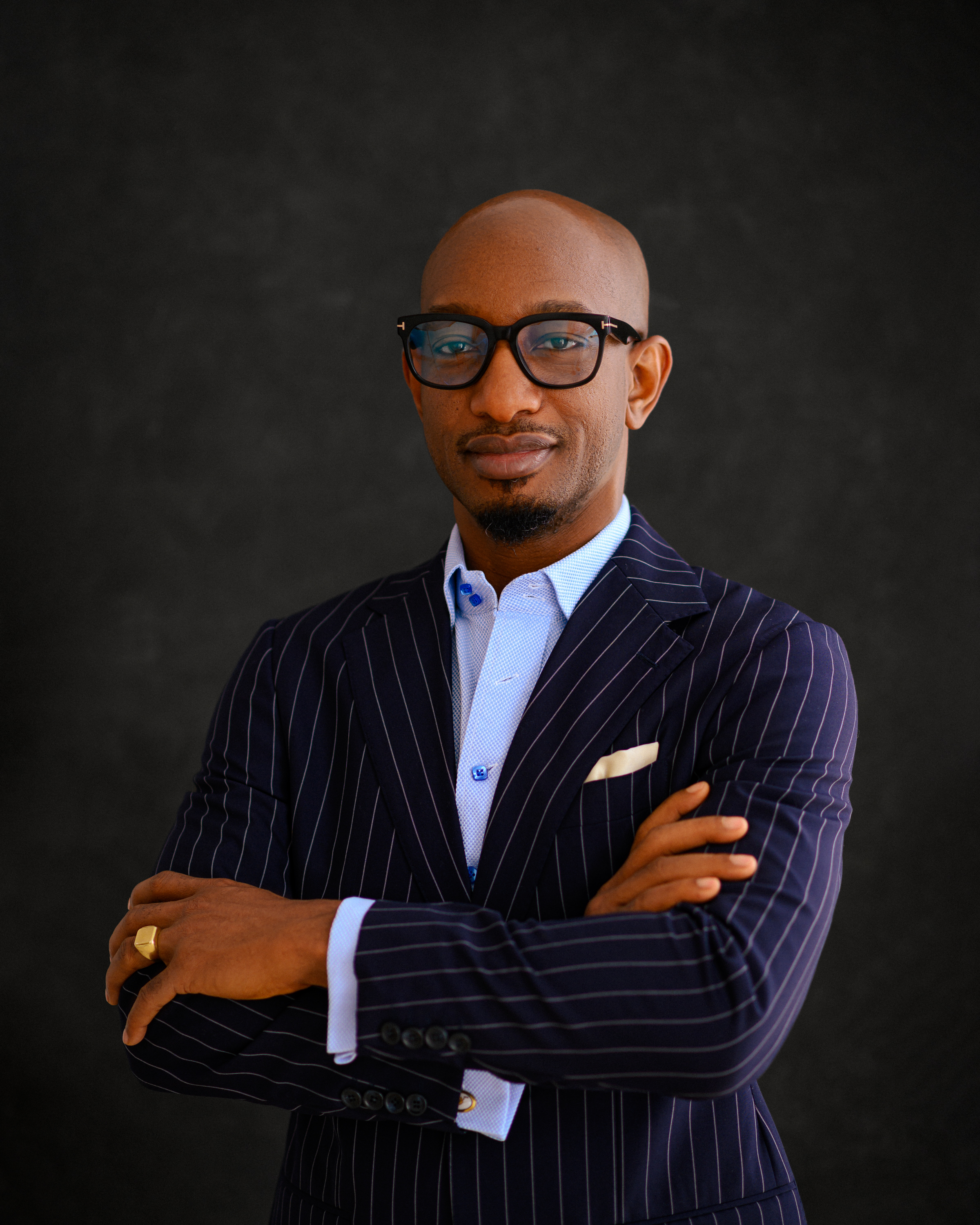
- Gbolahan Ayoola's Mural Design at Ojodu-Berger, Lagos State, Nigeria
- Citizenship: Nigerian
- Education: Obafemi Awolowo University
- Occupation: Artist

Gbolahan Ayoola is a Nigerian-based painter and sculptor with works using acrylics, pastels, pencil, and charcoal.

== Exhibitions and works ==
In 2020, Coca-Cola Nigeria selected Ayoola's work Blue Woman alongside the works of Kingsley Effiong and Perpetual Cyril to be painted on wall murals in Rivers, Enugu, and Oyo states.

He was also commissioned by Glenfiddich in Nigeria to design a commemorative package as part of the launch of their global art platform in 2021. Adidas installed Ayoola's Blue Woman in its flagship store in Lagos in 2023.

== Early life and education ==
Ayoola was born in 1977, in Ibadan, Nigeria. He graduated with a Bachelor's in Fine/Applied Arts from Obafemi Awolowo University in Ife, Nigeria in 2002.

== Awards ==
- 54 Nigerian Art Masters, 2007 by Embassy of Greece to Nigeria
- The National Art Competition, 2010 by African Artists' Foundation
