= Dahiru =

Dahiru is a given name. Notable people with the name include:

== Given name ==
- Dahiru Usman Bauchi (1927–2025), Nigerian Islamic scholar
- Dahiru Bako Gassol (born 1954), Nigerian politician
- Dahiru Awaisu Kuta (1949–2014), Nigerian politician
- Dahiru Mangal (born 1957), Nigerian businessman
- Dahiru Mohammed (born 1942), Nigerian politician
- Dahiru Musdapher (1942–2018), Nigerian Chief Justice of the Supreme Court of Nigeria
- Dahiru Sadi (born 1963), Nigerian footballer
- Dahiru Yahaya (1947–2021), Nigerian academic, educator and historian

== See also ==
- Umaru Dahiru (born 1952), Nigerian politician
- Yunusa Dahiru, perpetrator in the kidnapping of Ese Oruru
