= Betty Abah =

Nigerian writer and activist (born 1974)

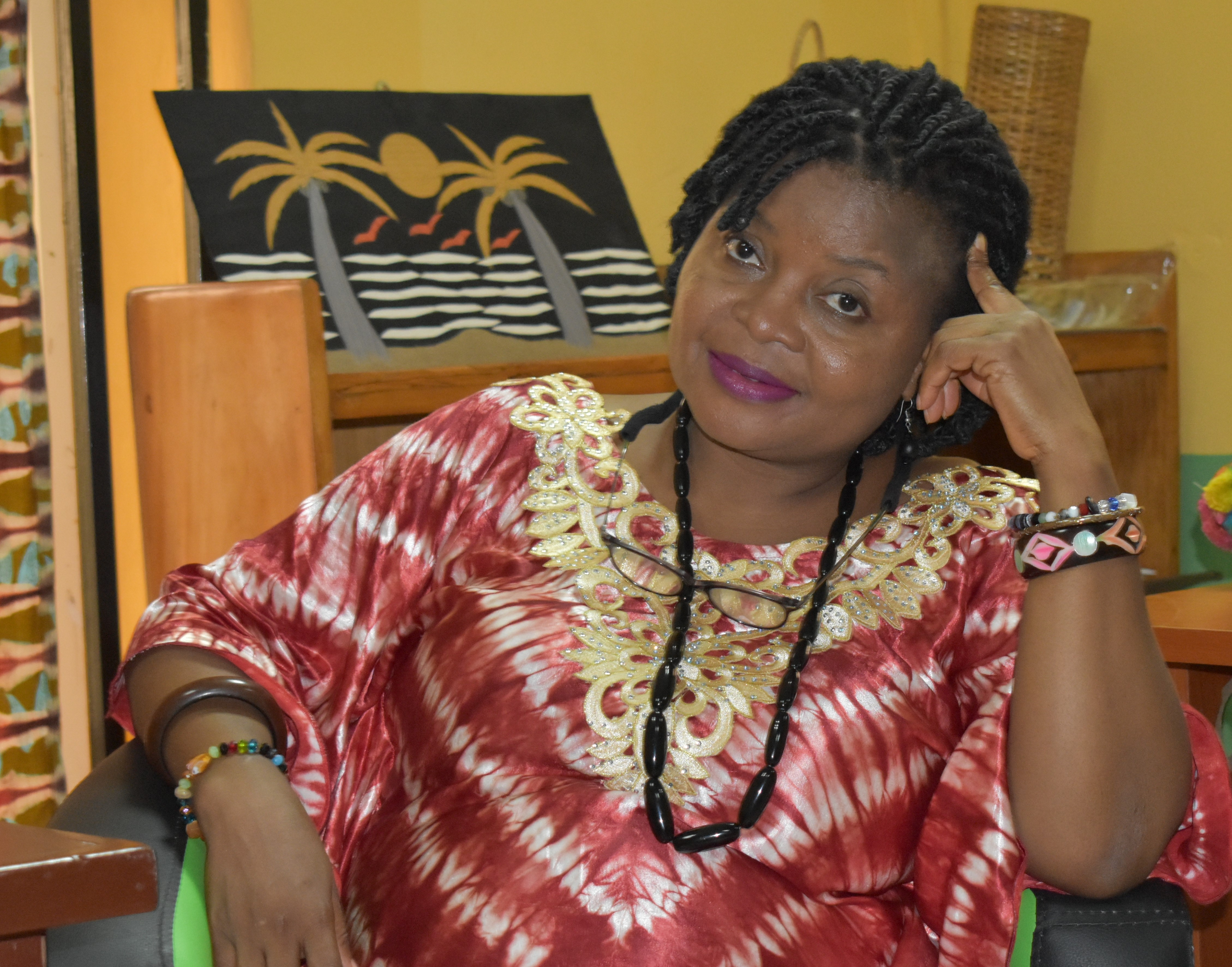
- Abah in 2020
- Born: March 6, 1974 (age 52); Otukpo, Benue State, Nigeria
- Education: University of Calabar, University of Lagos
- Occupations: journalist; author; children's right activist
- Awards: Media Excellence, State honours in National Youth Service Corps Nigeria, Reporter of the Year, Print Journalist of the Year, Honorary Mention Award for Investigative Reporting, Fellow award from Alfred Friendly Press Fellowships, USA.

Betty Abah (born March 6, 1974) is a Nigerian journalist, author and a women and children's rights activist. She is the Founder and Executive director of CEE HOPE, a girl-child rights and development non-profit organization based in Lagos State

== Early life and education ==
Abah was born in Otukpo, Benue State which is in the Middle Belt region of Nigeria. She obtained a first degree in English and literary studies from the University of Calabar in 1999 and a master's degree in English literature from the University of Lagos in 2012.

She worked with Environmental Rights Action/Friends of the Earth Nigeria, where she led the women’s campaign desk and coordinated projects focused on women’s environmental rights throughout the Niger Delta and the African sub-region. Abah’s work in journalism and her subsequent activism have earned her several local and international awards.

== Career ==
Abah is a journalist with experience in Nigeria, having worked with The Voice Newspaper in Makurdi, Benue State, and then Newswatch and Tell Magazine, before she proceeded to work with the Rocky Mountain News, in Denver, Colorado, US, as a fellow of the Alfred Friendly Press Fellowships. She is the author of Sound of Broken Chains, Go Tell Our King and Mother of Multitudes. Abah worked with Environmental Rights Action; Friends of the Earth Nigeria before establishing CEE-HOPE in December 2013.

== Activism ==
Abah has been involved in protesting several cases of human rights violations. Some of them include campaigns for the release of the Chibok girls abducted by the Boko Haram terrorist in North East Nigeria, campaigns for the environmental rights of Niger Delta women, the case of the torture involving three women in Ejigbo, Lagos by members of a vigilante group, the case of the kidnapping of Ese Oruru among others. In 2019, on the Menstrual Hygiene Day event held at Lagos, Abah advocated for the free distribution of sanitary pads to women and girls, reasoning that since government gives free condoms for sex, sanitary pads should also be made available for the needy women and girls.

Over the years, she has dedicated herself to several social justice causes, notably #BringBackOurGirls, Ese Oruru, #JusticeForEjigbo3, and #JusticeForOchanya. In October 2019, she edited a book documenting the unprecedented campaign surrounding Ochanya Ogbanje. Her work in engaging and developing thousands of young people in informal communities, particularly in Makoko, a well-known fishing community in Lagos, has been featured in numerous local and international media reports and documentaries. Additionally, CEE-HOPE has expanded its operations to Ogun, Plateau, Kaduna, Ebonyi, Benue, and other states.

In an interview with Daily Post in 2015, she was of the opinion that "the Chibok girls’ saga reveals so glaringly the progressive loss of our humanity as a nation and the many lives whose issues have become politicized. The Chibok girls saga remains a timeless indictment on our government, on their complete apathy to children's welfare, rights or safety a stab on the dignity of our women (just as the stunning response to the brutal killing of innocent young boys at the Buni Yadi school and the ensuring dance party)".

== Awards, recognitions and fellowships ==
Awards received by Betty Abah,
Year	Class	Category	Awarding body
2001	State honours	Community service	National Youth Service Corps Nigeria
2003	Reporter of the Year	Journalism	National Media Merit Awards Nigeria
2006	Fellow	internships	Alfred Friendly Press Fellowships, USA
2006	Fellow	Journalism	The Knight Journalism Press Fellowship, USA
2006	Fellow	Journalism	The Kaiser Family HIV/AIDS Fellowship, USA
2008	Child-Friendly Reporter of the Year	Journalism	Media Excellence
2010	Participation	Leadership Program	Global Tobacco Control Leadership Program, Johns Hopkins University, USA.
2012	Honorary mention	Poetry Prize	Association of Nigerian Authors
2014	Honorary Mention	Journalism	Wole Soyinka Award for Investigative Reporting
2016	Print Journalist of the Year	Journalism	Nigeria Media Merit Award.
2019	Visiting Fellowship	Human Rights	Human Rights Defenders Fellowship, University of York, England.
