= Centre for Children's Health Education, Orientation and Protection =

Nigerian non-governmental organization

- Founder: Betty Abah
- Type: Charitable Organization
- Purpose: Women’s and children’s rights
- Location: Lagos State, Nigeria
- Region served: Worldwide
- Website: cee-hope.org

Centre for Children's Health Education, Orientation and Protection also known as CEE-HOPE is a non-governmental organization that focus on the right and welfare of vulnerable children. It was established by Betty Abah, a Nigerian journalist, author and women and children's right activist. One of CEE-HOPE's major center of operation is Makoko, an urban slum in Nigeria.

== Campaigns ==
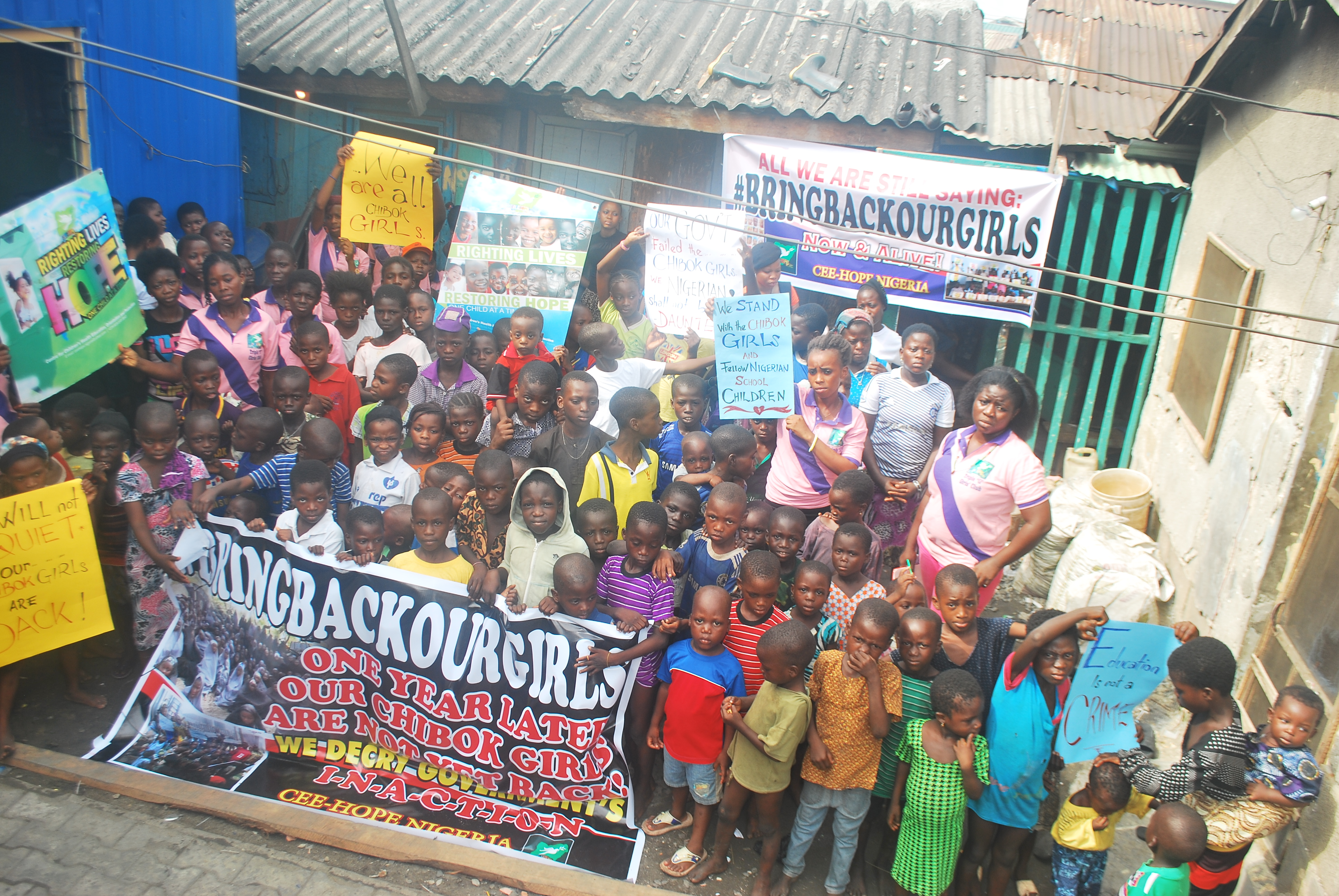
CEE-HOPE Campaign for Chibok girls

On 15 May 2014, CEE-HOPE led a campaign at Makoko for the release of the abducted Chibok girls as part of the global campaign for Chibok schoolgirls kidnapping.

On 16 February 2016, CEE-HOPE organized a seminar with the theme "Guard Against Rape" to educate girls on sexual abuse prevention. In attendance was Chinyere Anokwuru, a former Senior Special Assistant to the Lagos State government on Women and Girls who.

CEE-HOPE was involved in the campaign for the release of Ese Oruru, a 14 years old girl abducted from Bayelsa to Kano State.
