= Abah =

Abah is a surname. Notable people with this surname include:

- Betty Abah (born 1974), Nigerian journalist
- Enejoh Abah (born 1990), Nigerian badminton player
- Mohammed Seidu Abah, Ghanaian politician
- Yousab El Abah (1735–1826), Egyptian bishop and theologian
