= Maria Caballero =

María Caballero may refer to:

- María Cristina Caballero, Colombian journalist
- María Emilia Caballero, Mexican mathematician

== See also ==
- María Elena Hernández Caballero, Cuban poet
- Manuel María Caballero, Bolivian writer
