= Ife Olowu =

Nigerian-born visual artist

- Born: Ifeoluwa Oluwaseun Olowu; 1996 (age 29–30); Lagos, Nigeria
- Education: University of Lagos
- Known for: augmented reality in painting
- Notable work: colored reality

Ifeoluwa Oluwaseun Olowu well known as Ife Olowu is a Nigerian born visual artist. He is the first artist in Nigeria to integrate augmented reality (AR) into a painting and he is also known for his art collection "colored reality" which is being exhibited in 5 countries.

== Background and education ==
Ife Olowu was born into a family of seven and hails from Lagos, Nigeria. He did his primary and secondary education at the Yaba College of Technology Staff School. He proceeded to study painting in the Creative Arts department at the University of Lagos. During this time was when he started his designs and print business alongside studying art.

== Career ==
Ife Olowu's artistic journey dates back to his secondary school days, drawing inspiration from his mum, who was a textile artist specialized in Adire and batik.

Upon graduation, he transitioned into the professional sphere, establishing a printing press and design company. The venture demanded considerable attention, leaving him as a part-time studio artist.

His relationship with Augment Reality (AR) began between late 2019 and 2020, during the COVID-19 lockdown period an opportune time due to the pandemic-induced restrictions that provided him with ample time for exploration. The objective was to infuse AR into his artistry, which is a new idea in the African context.

After a comprehensive period of learning and planning, the culmination arrived in June 2022 with the launch of his inaugural collection – the "Colored Reality." It is a collection of paintings of Makoko, Busy Lagos, and Identity that manifest when integrated with smartphones.

The launch of this collection made him the first visual artist in Nigeria to integrate augmented reality (AR) into a painting; this collection has so far gained global recognition and has been featured on, REUTERS, CNN, BBC. Channels TV, and others.

== Exhibitions ==
Ife Olowu launched his second collection in 2023, titled "Metamorphosis" which is a fusion of art and technology. He held a solo exhibition titled "Metamorphosis: A Journey into the Future" at Cera Cerni ArtHub, Lagos from December 3 to 15 2023. and also did a solo exhibition "Nigeria re-envisioned photo art exhibition" in May, 2024 held in Helsinki, Finland.

He has participated in group exhibitions "diverse perspectives" in July, 2024 at the Landmark Art gallery, Lagos, "The artistic pulse of the diaspora", in November 2024, United Kingdom. and "Art4Health" held in December 2024 in Lagos aimed at raising funds for cancer patients.
