= María Cristina Caballero =

Colombian journalist

- Education: Javeriana University (Bachelor's); John F. Kennedy School of Government, Harvard University (Master's)
- Occupations: journalist, editor
- Organization: El Tiempo
- Known for: reporting on organized crime
- Awards: Alfred Friendly Press Fellow (1993); International Press Freedom Award (1999)

María Cristina Caballero is a Colombian journalist known for her coverage of organized crime, corruption, and paramilitary forces. In 1999, she was awarded the International Press Freedom Award of the Committee to Protect Journalists.

== Journalistic career ==
Caballero holds a bachelor's degree in Communications and Journalism from Javeriana University as well as a Master's in public administration from Harvard University's John F. Kennedy School of Government, where she was a Mason Fellow.

Caballero began reporting for the Bogotá newspaper La Republica at the age of 16. As a female journalist working in a culture that valued machismo, she has said that she was initially given poorer quality assignments, but overcame this obstacle by investigating "key issues" on her own time and becoming a "happy workaholic".

She went on to become Editor of Investigations at El Tiempo, Colombia's largest daily paper, as well as at the news magazine Cambro. From 1998 to 2001, she worked as Director of Investigations at the weekly Semana. Her articles have also appeared in The New York Times, Newsweek, CNN Interactive, The Boston Globe, The Miami Herald, and the International Herald Tribune, as well as Columbia Journalism Review and Nieman Reports. Caballero has stated that "at least a dozen" Colombian politicians were jailed for corruption as a result of her reporting.

In 1997, she was granted a rare interview with Carlos Castaño, leader of one of Colombia's right-wing paramilitary groups, the Peasant Self-Defense Forces of Córdoba and Urabá. To meet Castaño, Caballero was forced to ride on horseback for eight hours through mountainous terrain, injuring her back severely enough that she later required surgery for a compressed nerve. In the interview, Castaño revealed for the first time that he was ready for peace talks.

In 1999, Caballero received repeated death threats on her home answering machine; in addition, a security officer from her building warned her that a man was waiting near her apartment with a gun. At the invitation of Harvard Dean Joseph Nye, she left Colombia that day, moving to Cambridge, Massachusetts.

== Awards and recognition ==
Caballero was named an Alfred Friendly Press Fellow by Time magazine's Washington, DC bureau in 1993, and a Nieman Fellow of Harvard University in 1997. In 1991, she was awarded Colombia's Simón Bolívar National Journalism Prize for investigating corruption at the National Property Institute, and again in 1998 for her interview with Castaño.

The Inter American Press Association awarded Caballero its Human Rights Award in 1990. In November 1998, she was also awarded the International Press Freedom Award of the Committee to Protect Journalists, "an annual recognition of courageous journalism". CPJ Board Chairman Gene Roberts praised Cabellero and the other recipients as "courageous journalists who faced jail, physical harm and even death, simply for doing their work".
