= Alfred Friendly =

American journalist

- Born: December 30, 1911; Salt Lake City, Utah, U.S.
- Died: November 7, 1983 (aged 71); Washington, D.C., U.S.
- Education: Amherst College
- Occupation: Journalist
- Employer: The Washington Post (1939–1971)
- Writing career
- Notable awards: Pulitzer Prize for International Reporting (1968)

Alfred Friendly (December 30, 1911 – November 7, 1983) was an American journalist, editor and writer for The Washington Post. He began his career as a reporter with the Post in 1939 and became Managing Editor in 1955. In 1967 he covered the Mideast War for the Post in a series of articles for which he won the Pulitzer Prize for International Reporting in 1968.

== Early life and education ==
Alfred Friendly was born on December 30, 1911, in Salt Lake City to Edward Rosenbaum and Harriet Friendly. In 1933, he graduated from Amherst College.

== Career ==
In 1933, Friendly came to Washington, DC, to look for work. A former professor who worked in the Commerce Department hired him, but his appointment to a high position at such a young age earned him criticism in the press and he resigned. For the next year he traveled the country in the middle of the Depression, eventually returning to become a reporter at The Washington Daily News, writing a column for government employees. Less than two years later he was hired to write the same kind of column for the Post, where he was soon assigned to cover war mobilization efforts and anti-war strikes.

When World War II broke out he entered the Army Air Force, rising to the rank of major before leaving in 1945. While in the military he was involved in cryptography and intelligence operations, finally becoming the second in command at Bletchley Park, and the highest ranking American officer there. After the war he remained in Europe as press aide to W. Averell Harriman, supervisor of the Marshall Plan.

A year later he returned to Washington and to the Post, where he became assistant managing editor in 1952 and managing editor in 1955. In 1966 he became an associate editor and a foreign correspondent based out of London. Hearing rumors of war in 1967 he headed to the Middle East where he was present throughout the 1967 War and wrote his series of award-winning articles. He retired from the Post in 1971, though he continued writing occasional editorials and book reviews.

== Personal life ==
Friendly married Jean; they had five children.

In 1983, at age 71, Friendly, who had developed both lung and throat cancer, committed suicide by shooting himself.

== Awards ==
- 1958: Honorary Doctorate, Amherst College
- 1968: Pulitzer Prize

== Legacy ==
After his death, the Alfred Friendly Foundation was established. It administers the Alfred Friendly Press Partners to bring foreign journalists to the United States for internships at prominent news organizations. The Archives and Special Collections at Amherst College holds a collection of his papers.

== Works ==
During his retirement, Friendly wrote several books:

- Crime and Publicity (1967)
- Beaufort of the Admiralty (1977)
- The Dreadful Day: The Battle of Manzikert, 1071 (1982)

Articles:

- "McCarthyism Revisited"

== See also ==
- Alfred Friendly Foundation
- The Washington Post
