= Makoko =

Informal settlement in Lagos state, Nigeria

- Informal Settlement
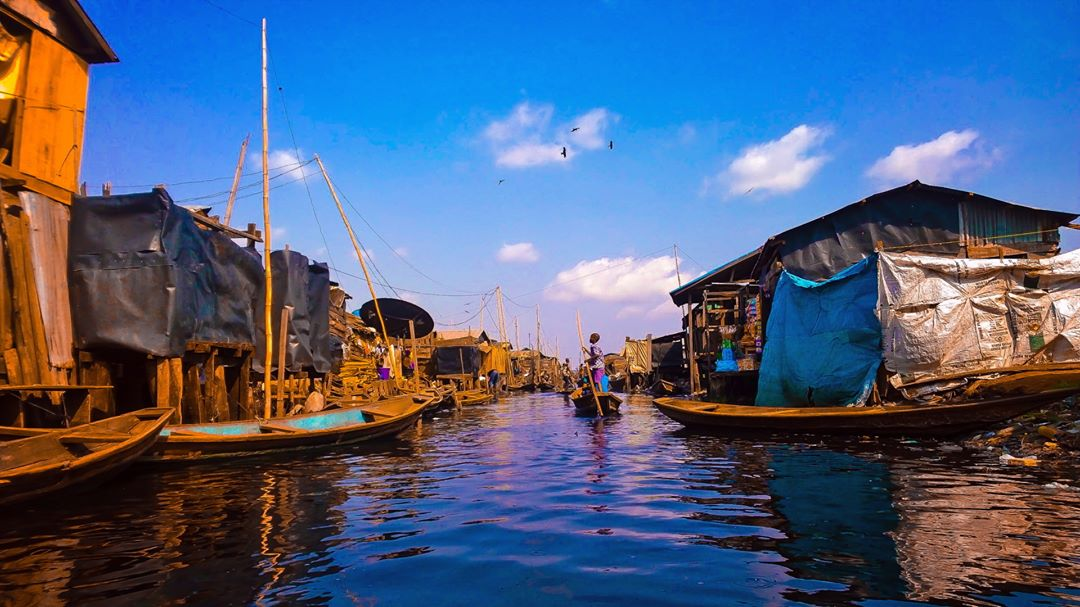
- A landscape photo of Makoko, 2017.

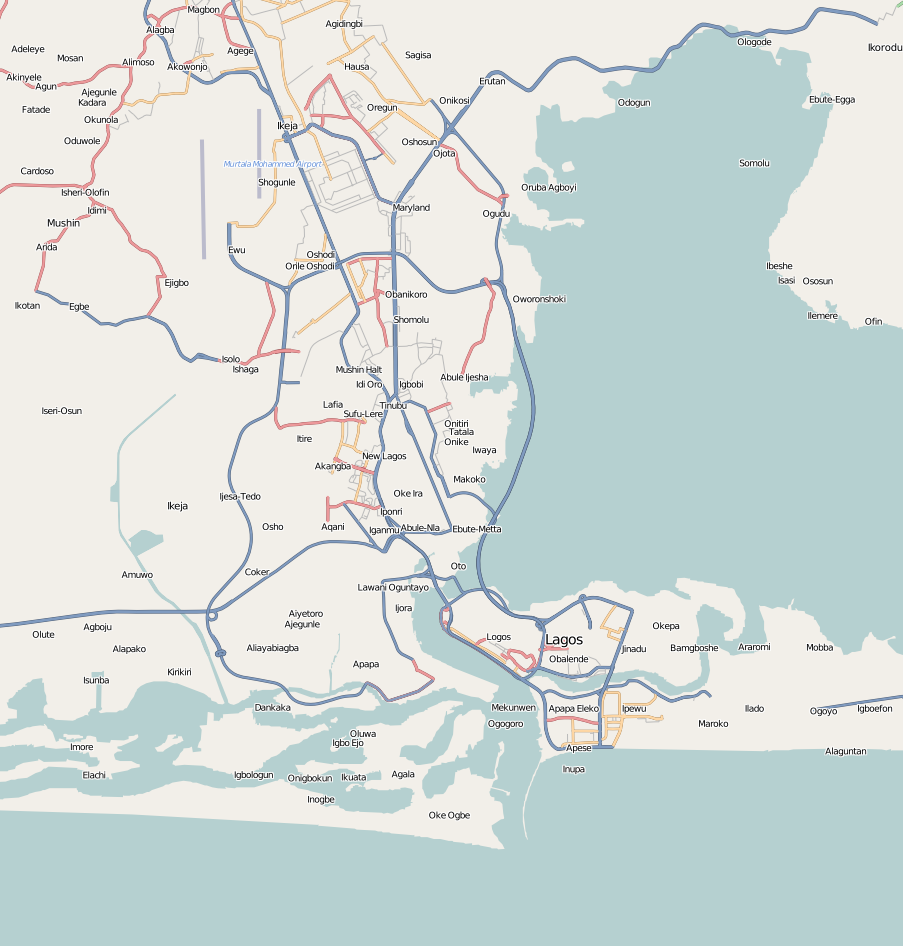
- Location within Lagos
- Coordinates: 6°29′44″N 3°23′39″E
- Country: Nigeria
- State: Lagos State
- Slum: Lagos
- LGA: Lagos Mainland
- Settled: 19th century

Population (2020)
  - Total: 85,000 – 1,000,000
- Time zone: UTC+1

Makoko is an informal settlement across the 3rd Mainland Bridge located on the coast of mainland Lagos, Nigeria. A third of the community is built on stilts along the lagoon and the rest is on the land. The waterfront part of the community is largely harboured by the Egun people who migrated from Badagary and Republic of Benin and whose main occupation is fishing.

Makoko comprises six individual villages, of which four are floating communities (Adogbo, Migbewhe, Oko Agbon and Yanshiwhe) and two are on land (Apollo and Sogunro). The state government of Lagos refers to the area as Makoko-Iwaya Waterfront.

Makoko is sometimes referred to as the "Venice of Africa" owing to its waterways. Its population is considered to be 85,840; however, the area was not officially counted as part of the 2007 census and the population has been estimated to be much higher – as high as over a million in 2020. In July 2012, the Lagos State government ordered that some of the stilts beyond the power lines be brought down without proper notice. This led to the destruction of several stilts on the Iwaya/Makoko waterfront and many families were rendered homeless.

== History ==
Established in the 18th to 19th century, much of Makoko rests in structures constructed on stilts above Lagos Lagoon. Makoko is a neighbouring community to Iwaya on the waterfront and Oko Baba.

The name Makoko is literally translated from Yoruba to be "Pick Akoko". In Yoruba tradition, "Akoko" leaves are used to aid fertility and also used during Chieftaincy coronation, present day Makoko had the leaf growing in abundance.

== Demolition ==
While the commune often gets foreign media and travel influencer attention, successive Lagos State governments have considered it an eyesore and effected several rounds of demolitions including in 2005, 2012 and January 2026 citing safety violations.

In July 2012, Lagos State government under the governorship of Babatunde Fashola ordered that the stilts on the Iwaya/Makoko waterfront be demolished and dozens of stilts were demolished within 72 hours of notice to the residents. Nearly 3,000 people lost their homes to the demolition exercise. Two months after the partial demolition, a Serac housing affiliate known as the Urban Spaces Innovation developed a regeneration plan for Makoko that would bring the community together with academics, non-profits, and international consultants. The plan was submitted to the Lagos State Ministry of Urban and Physical Planning in January 2014.

=== Reactions ===
Residents as well as Environment, Justice and Human Rights groups have described the government actions as "violent and unlawful," and often without notice and/or disregarding judicial restraining orders. They also condemn the lack of resettlement or support for the vulnerable displaced population that inhabit these communities.

Similar demolitions have occurred in other waterfront areas, such as Oworonshoki on the opposite side of the lagoon from Makoko, as well as in Maroko. After displacing thousands, the cleared areas are promptly sand filled with the reclaimed land sold to property developers who then build expensive high-end waterfront estates for the wealthy elite.

== Gallery ==
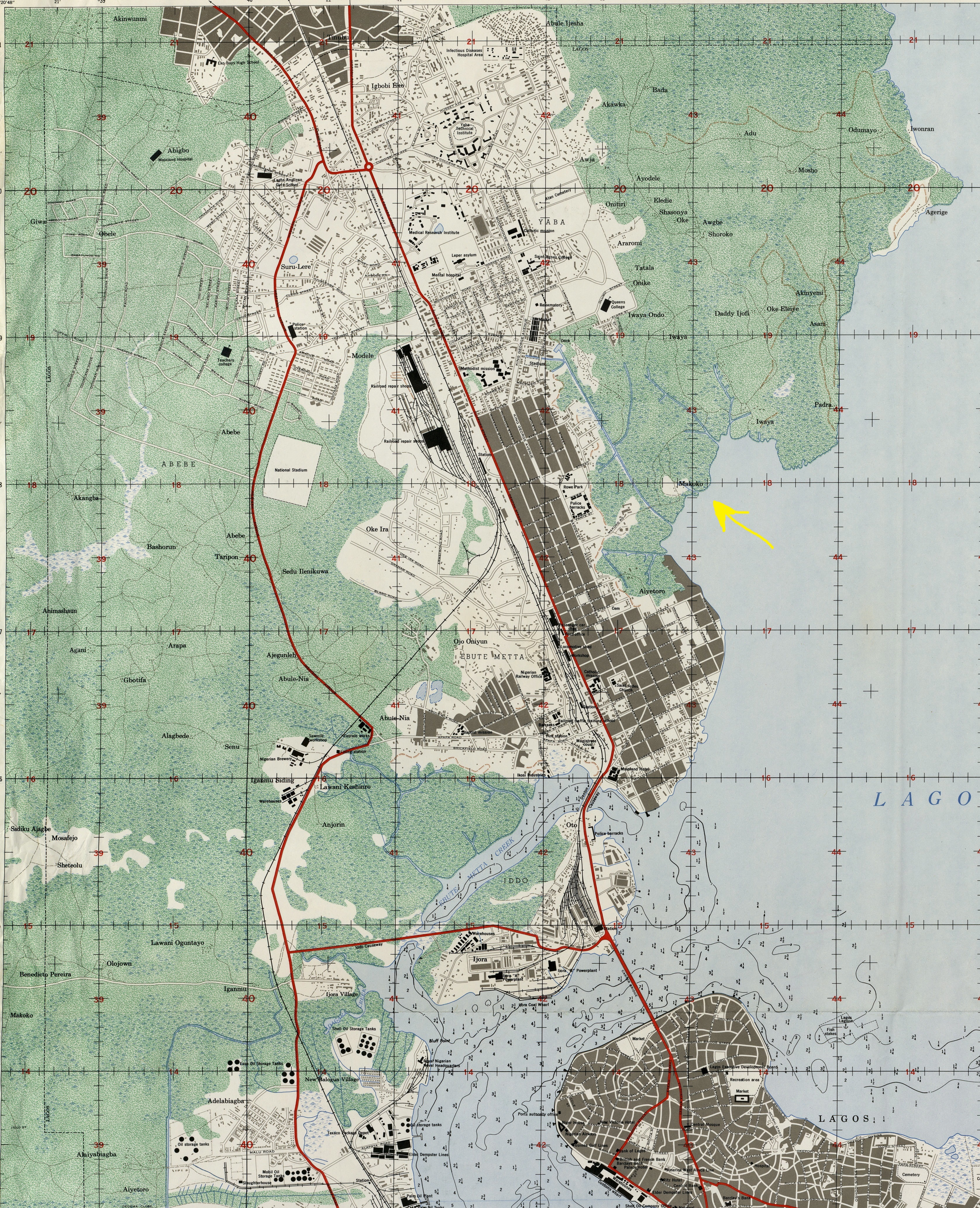
Detail of map of Lagos, 1962, showing Makoko and Lagos Mainland

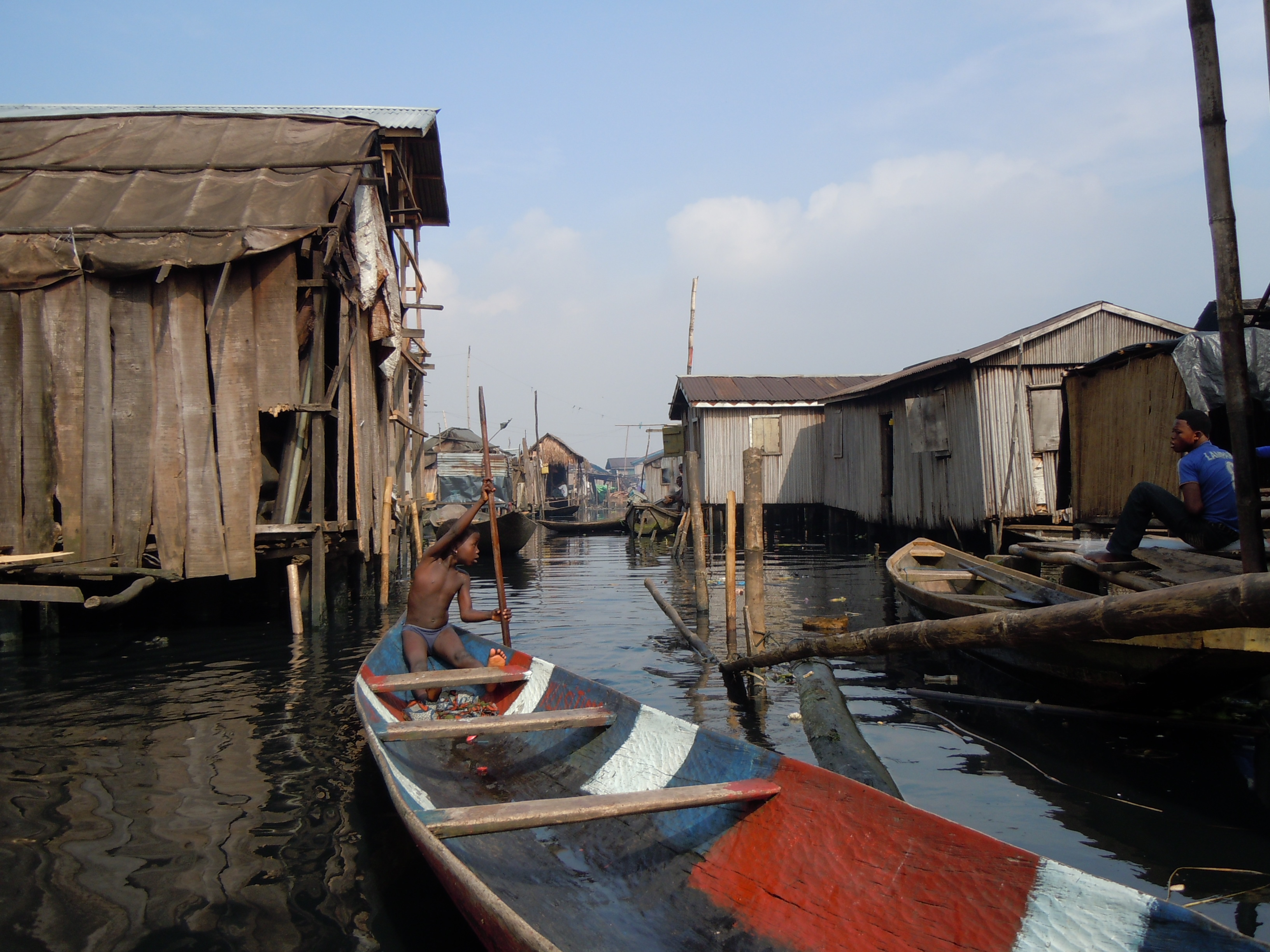

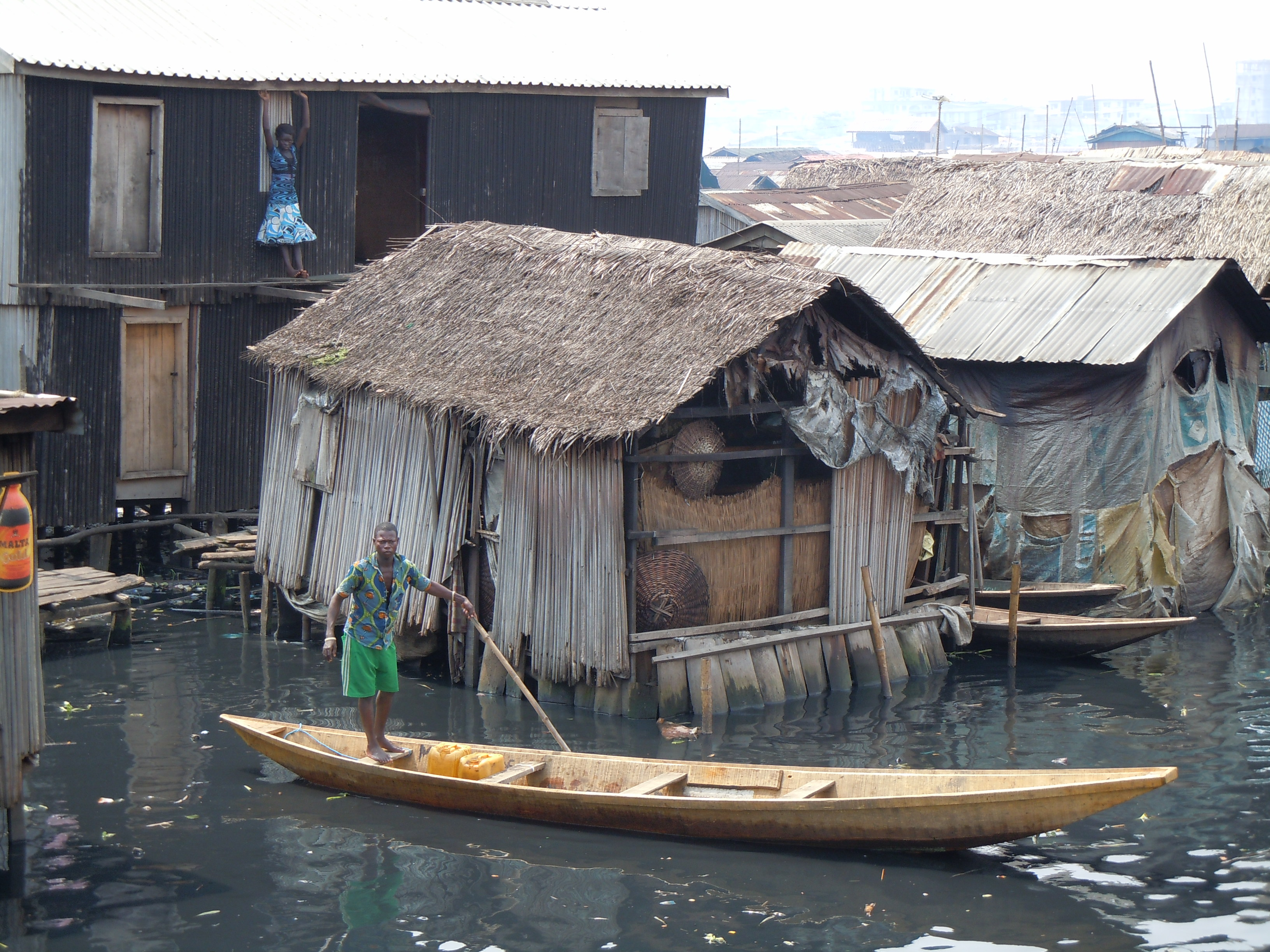

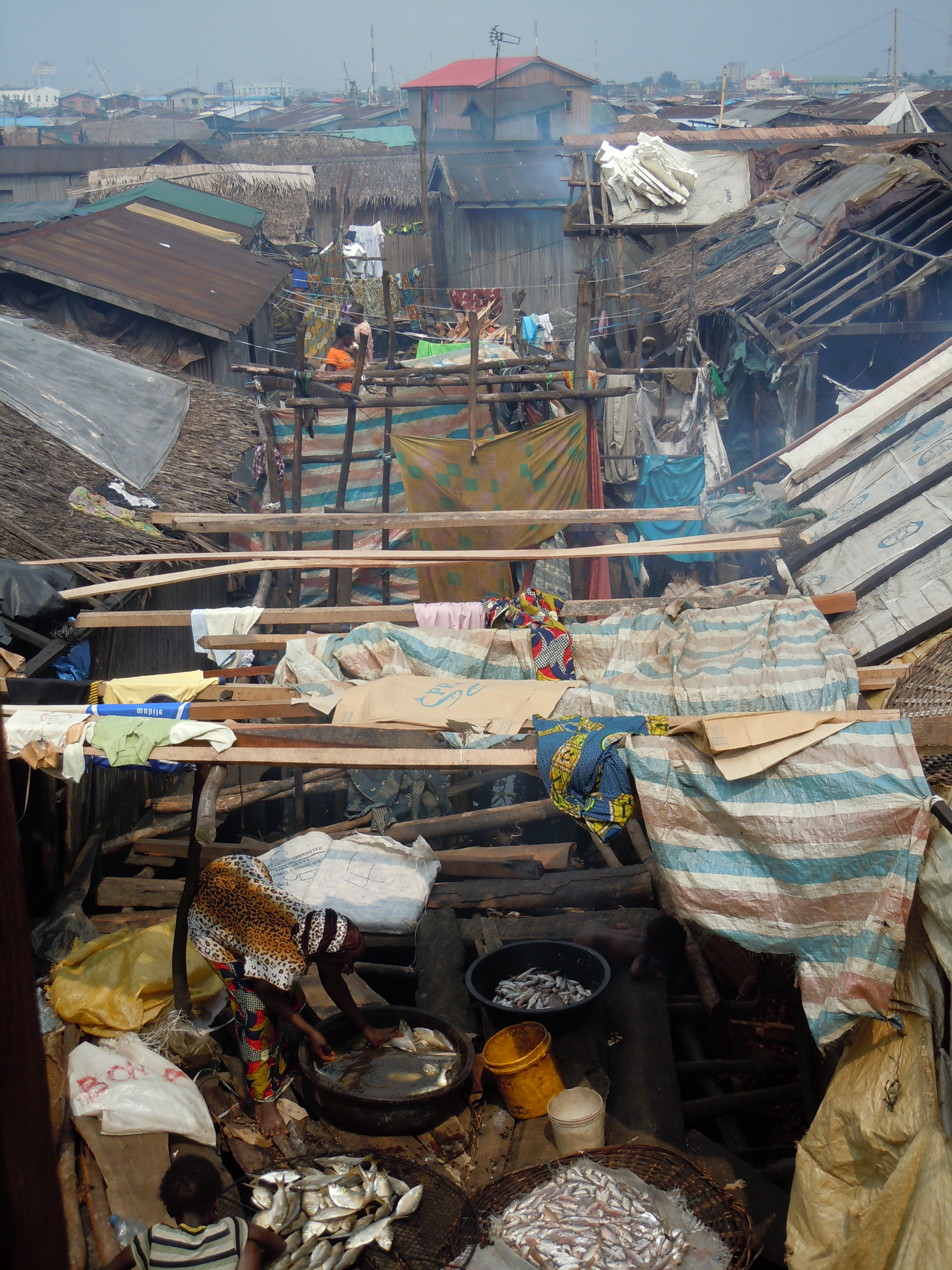

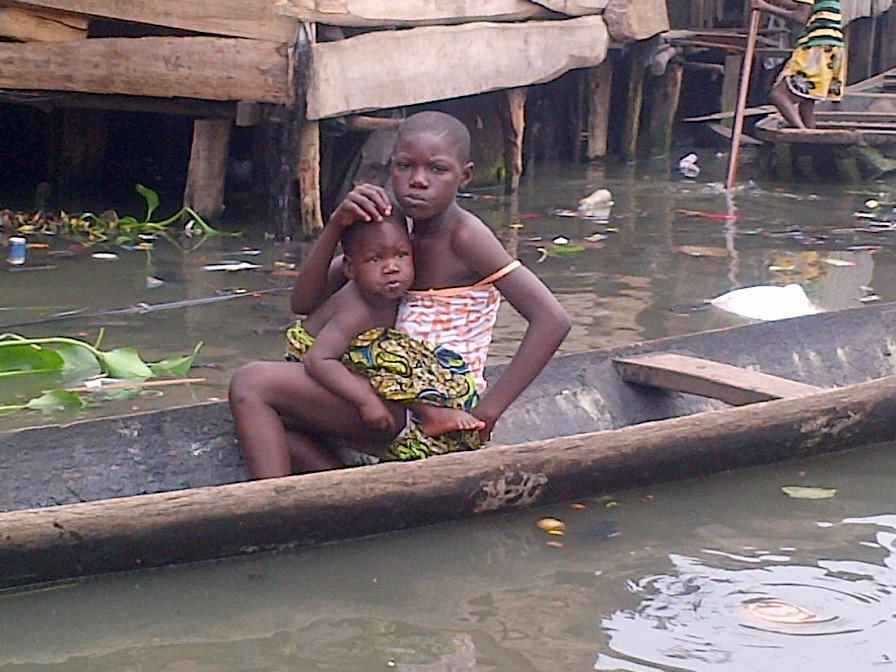
Makoko: A girl and her sister in a canoe

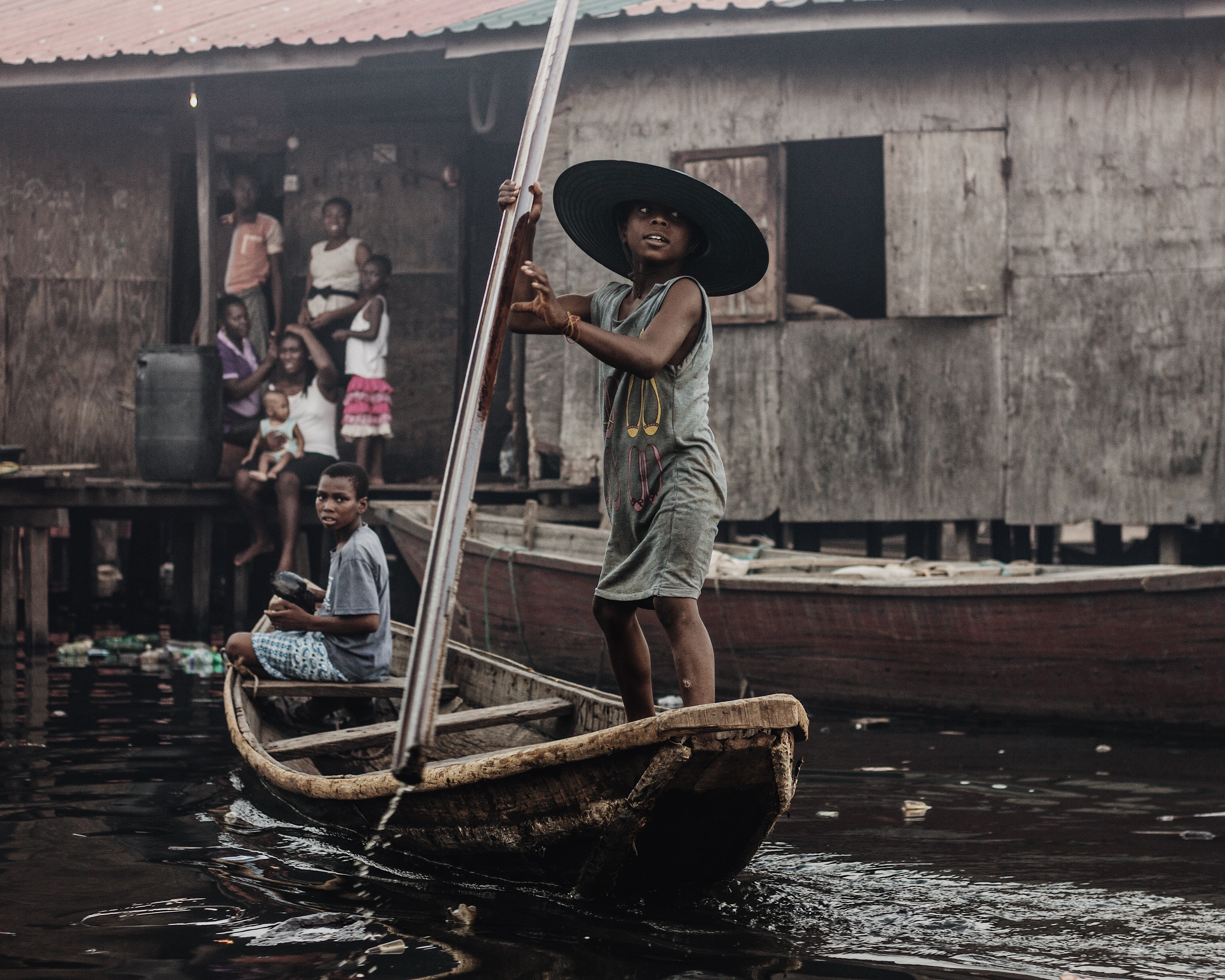
Boys paddling a canoe is a common view at Makoko

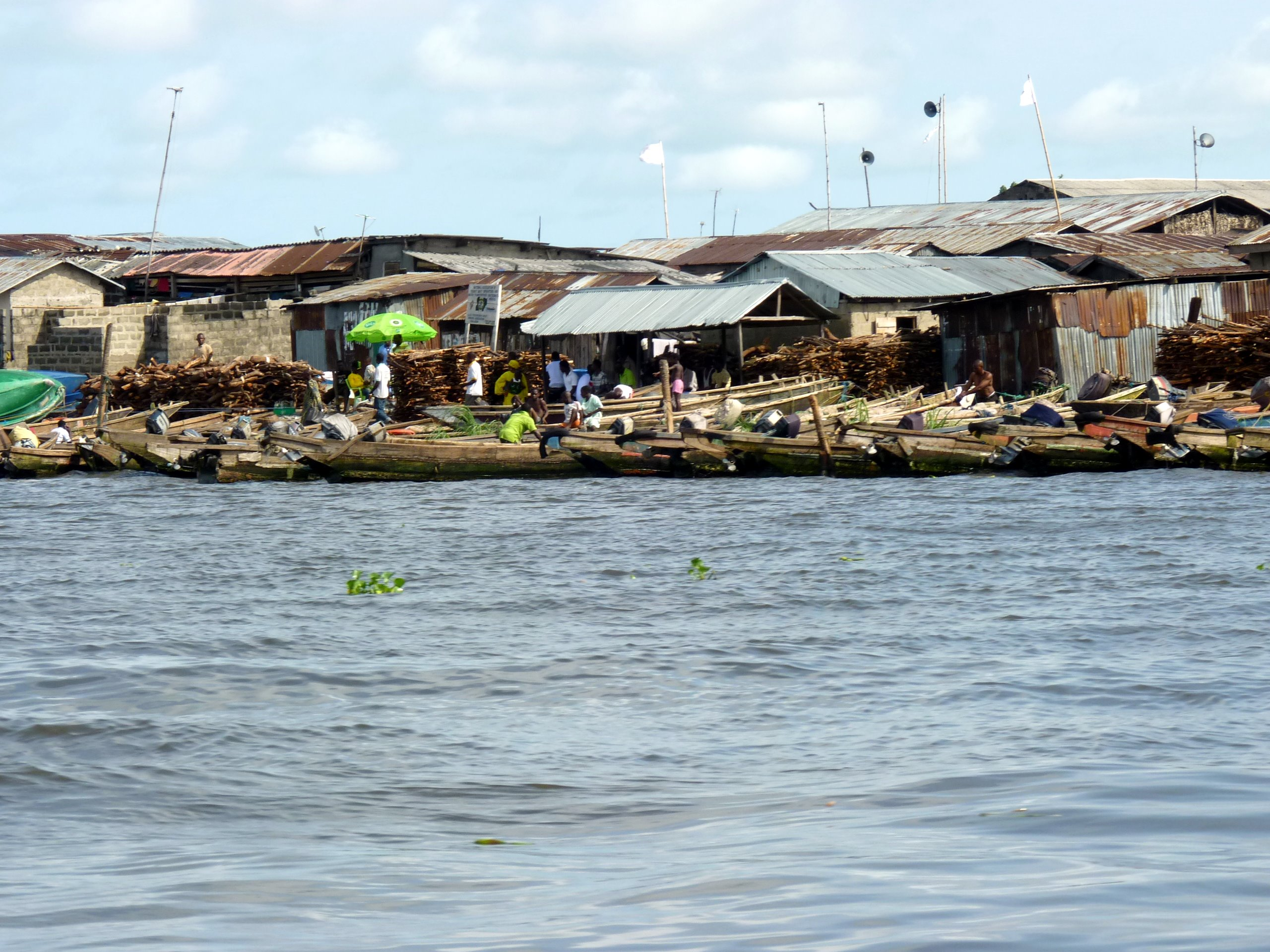
Makoko, 2010

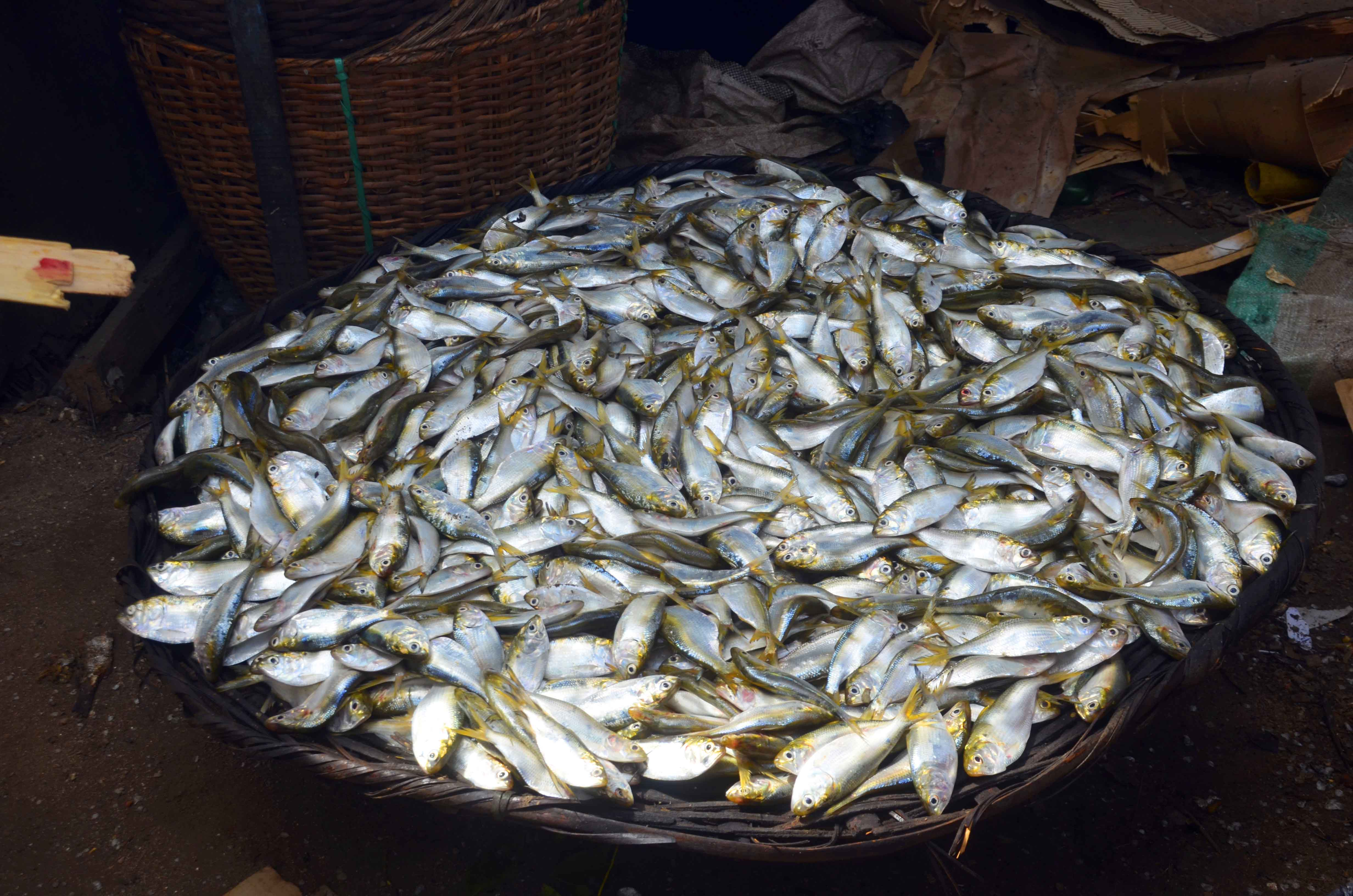
Fish caught at Makoko

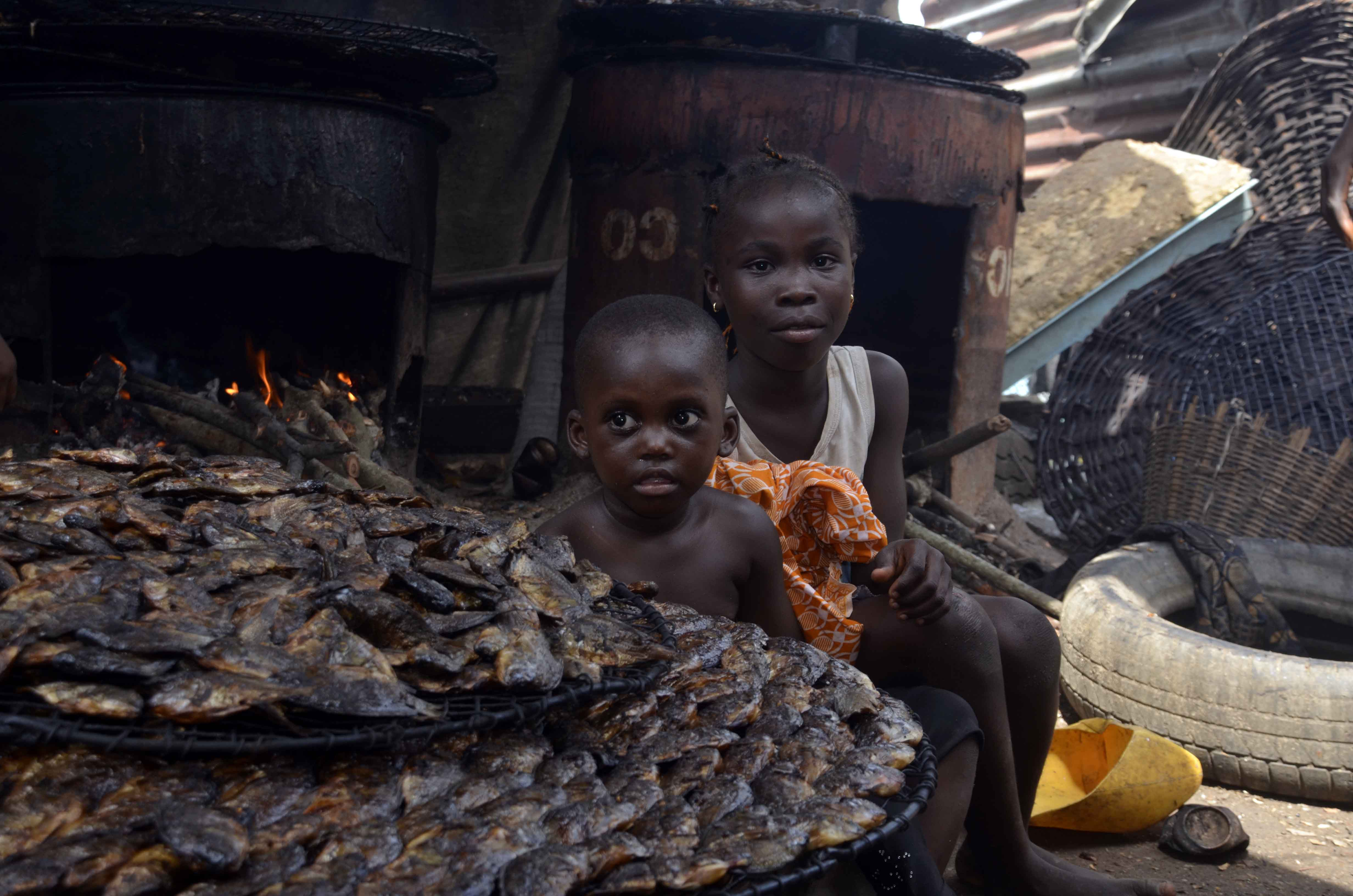
Fish roasting in Makoko

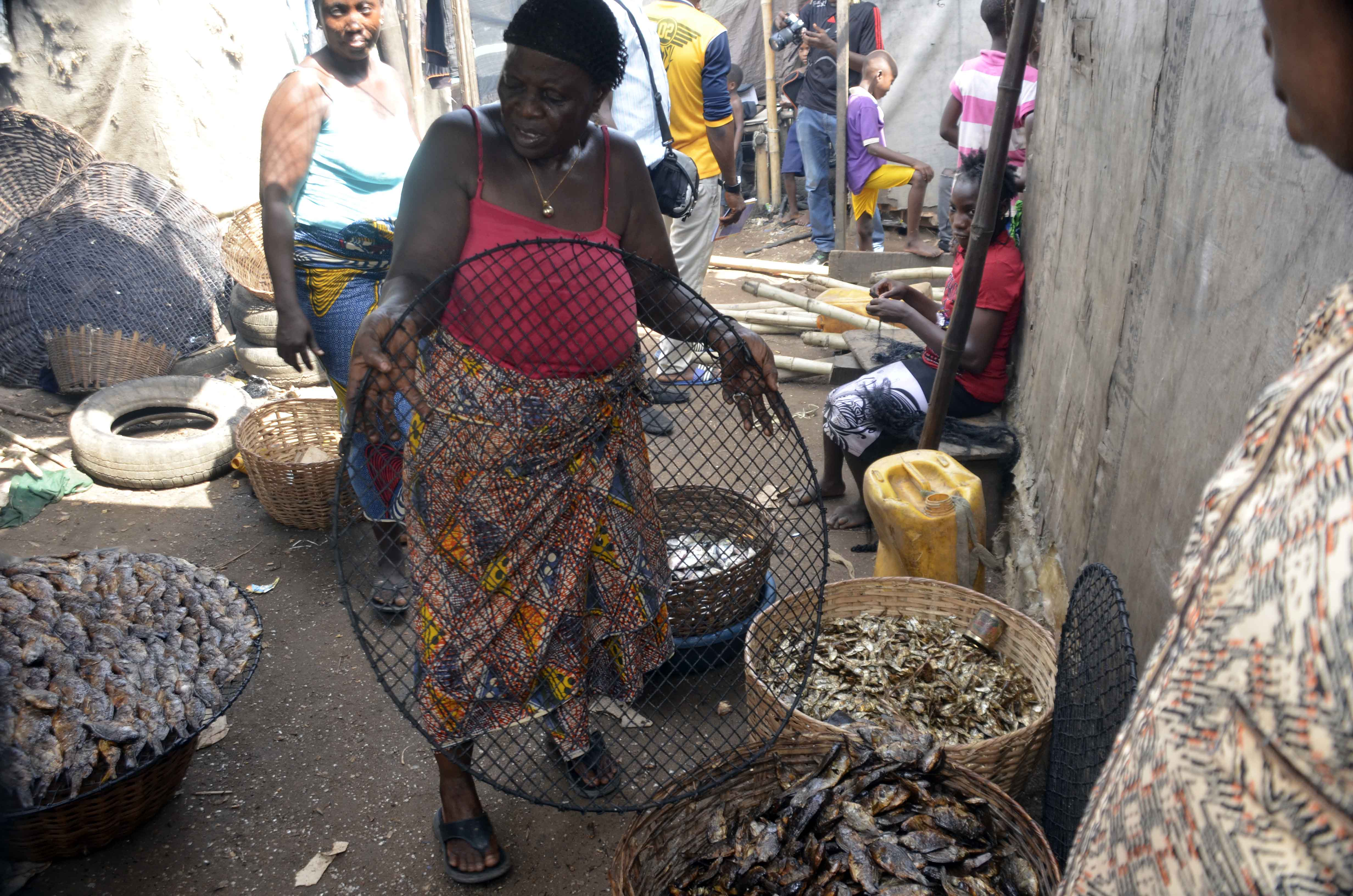
After fish roasting in Makoko

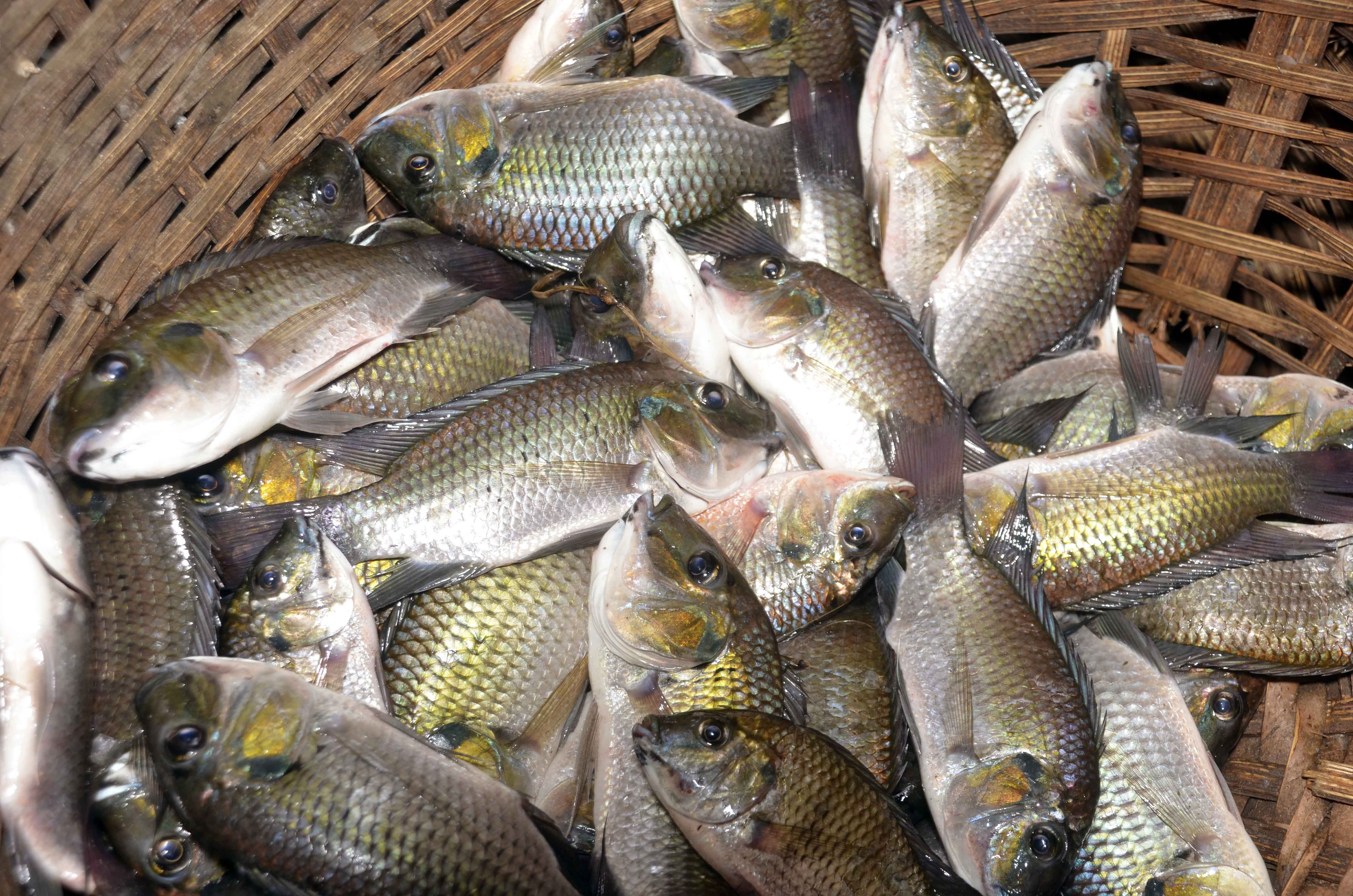

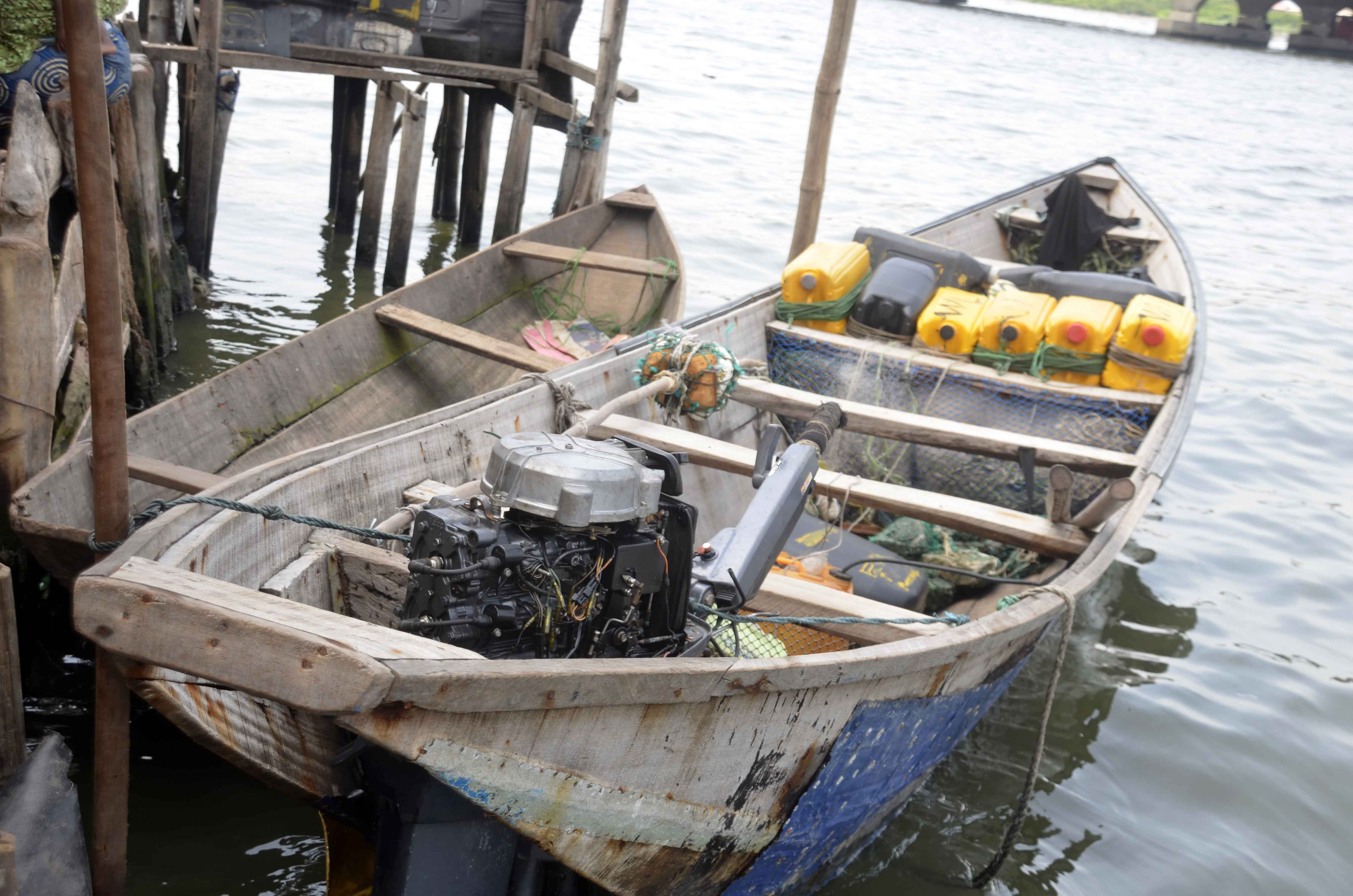

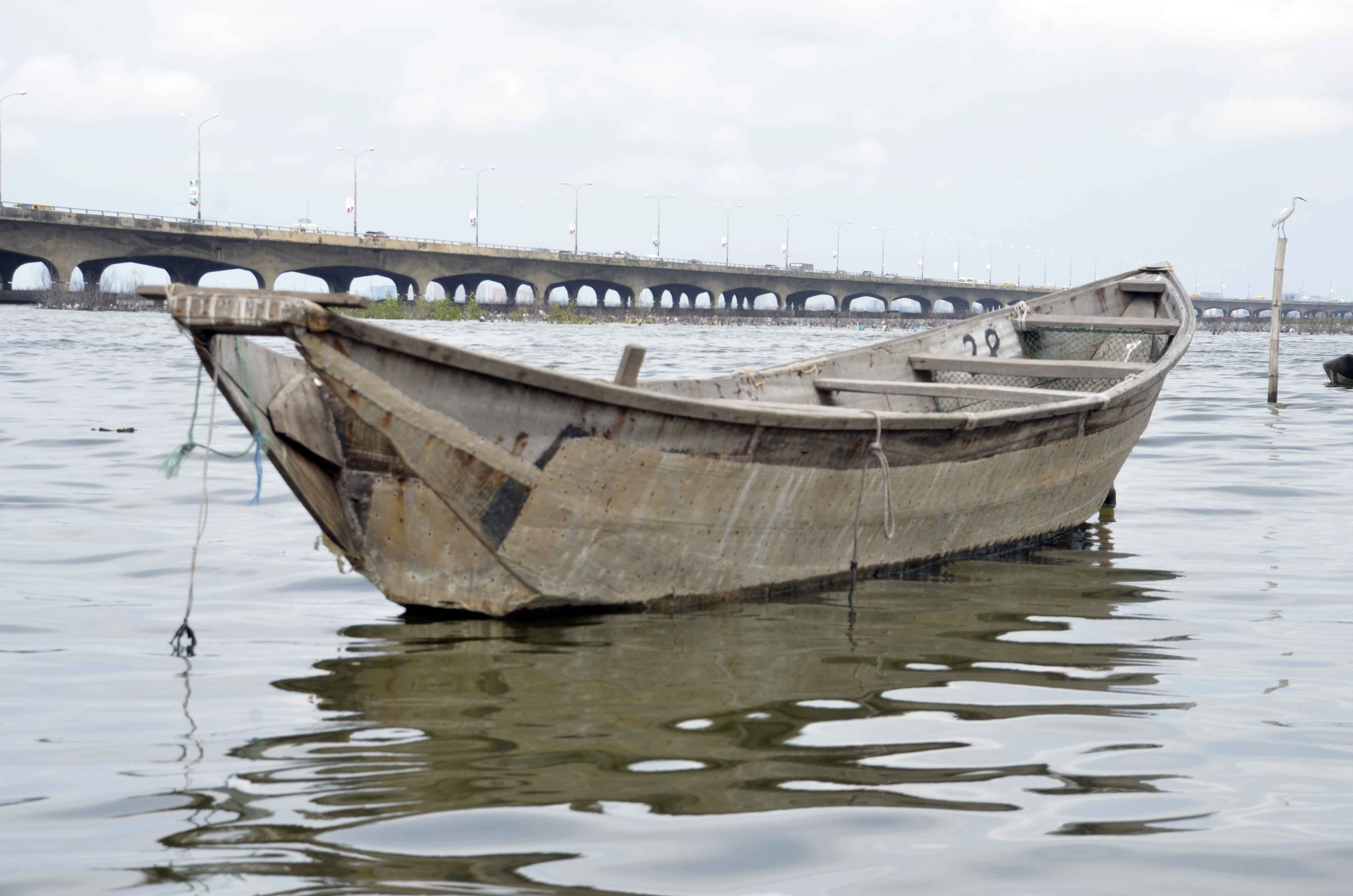

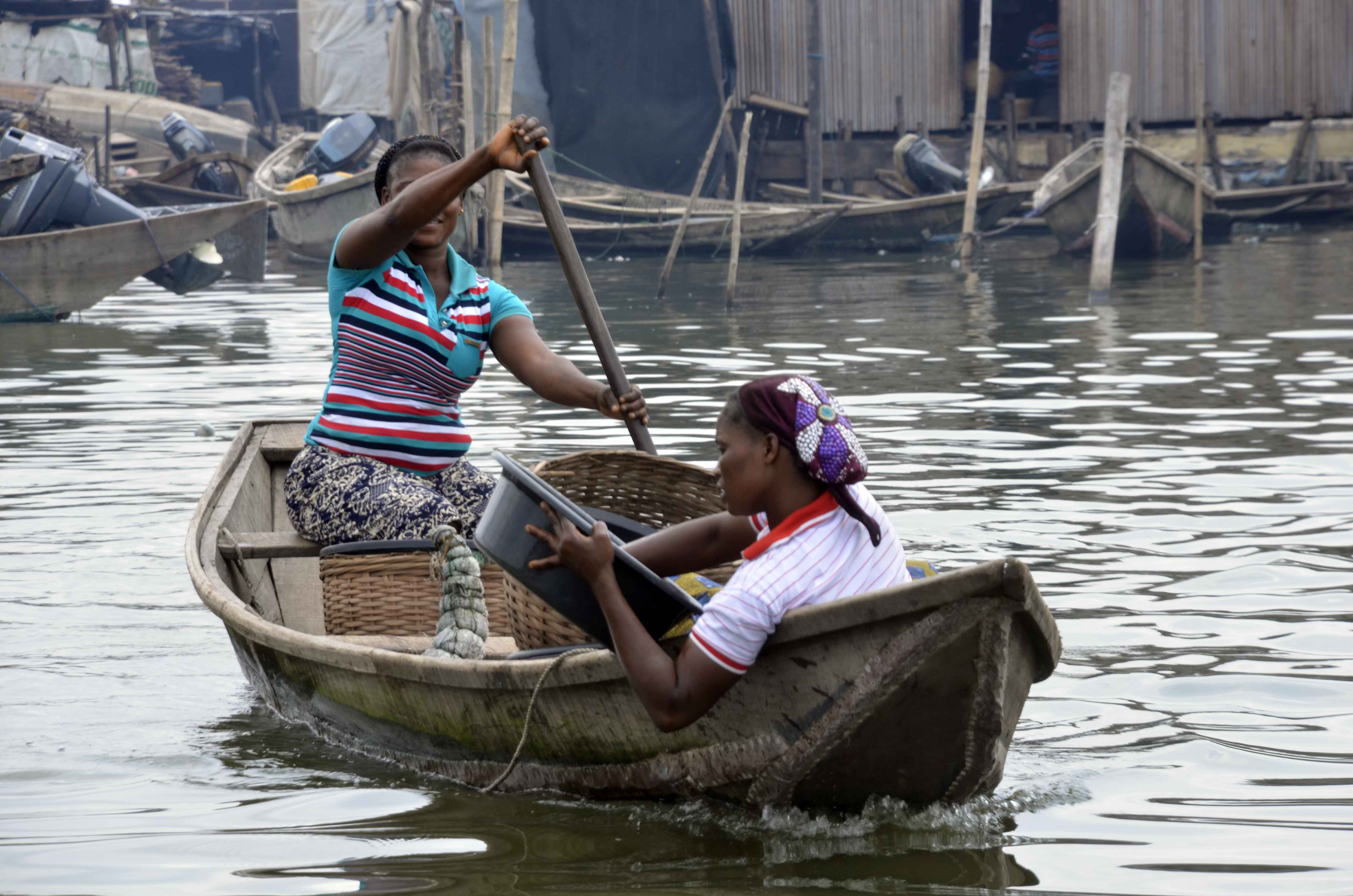

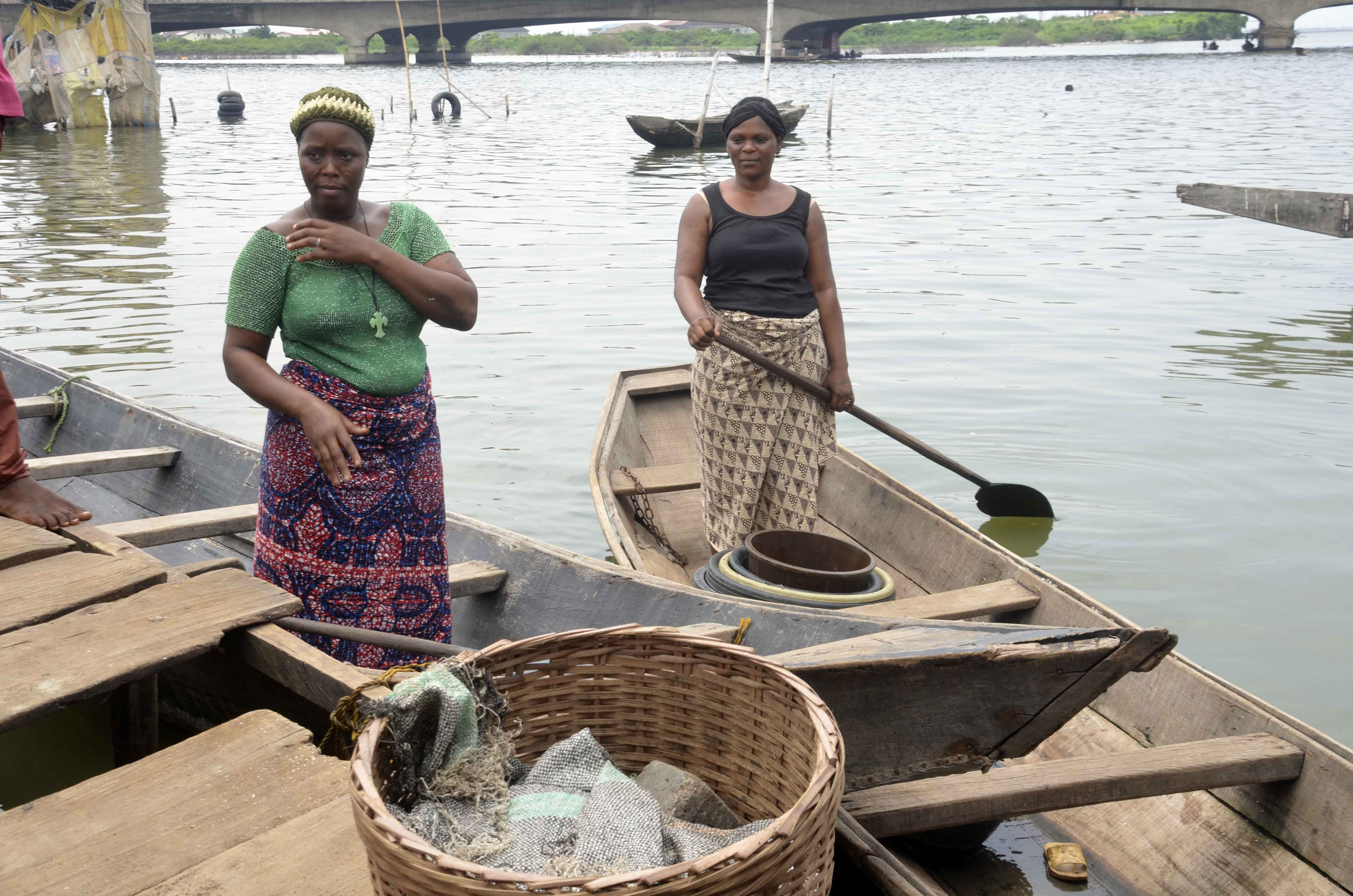

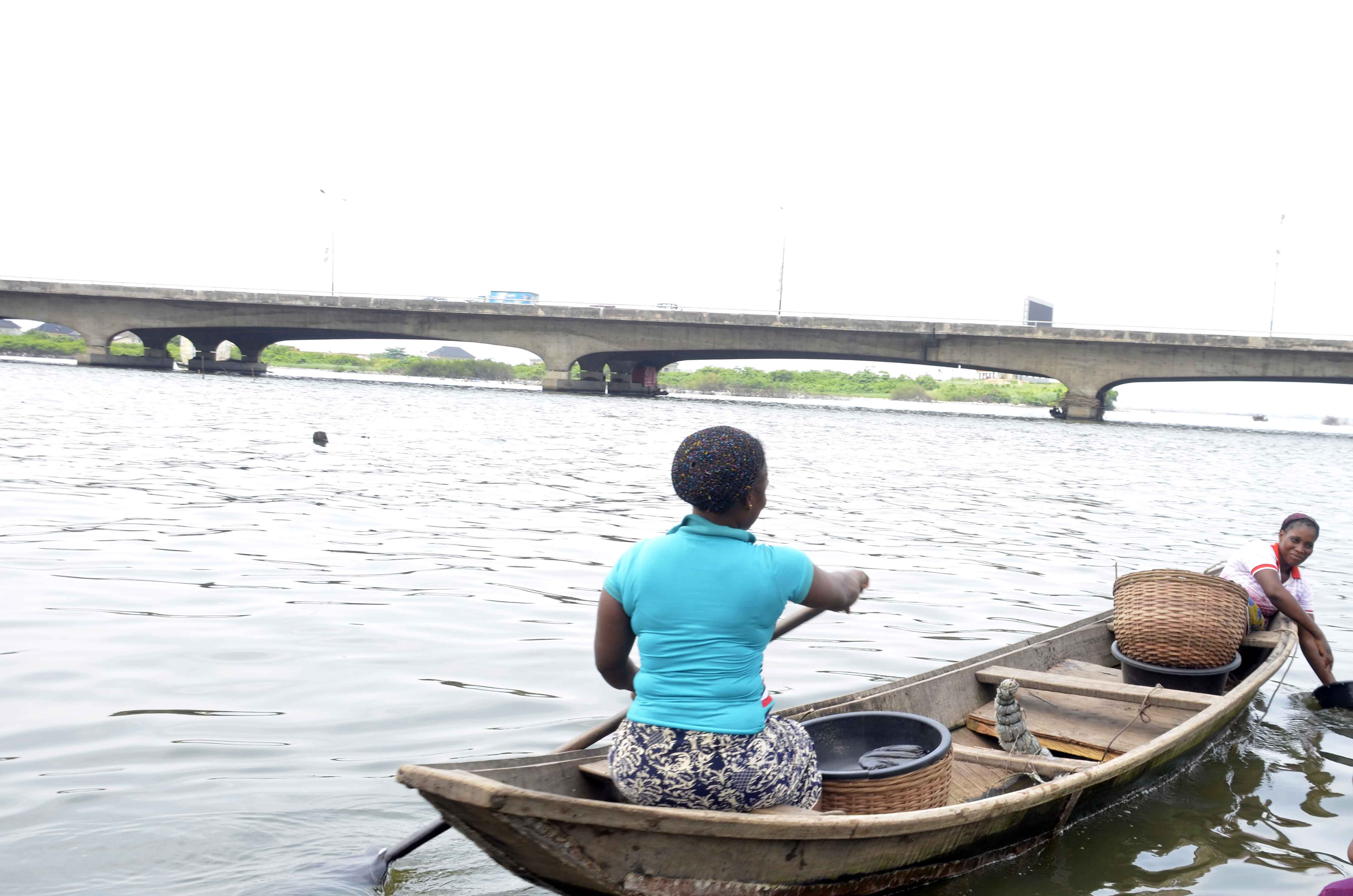

== See also ==
- Makoko Floating School
- CEE HOPE
- Ganvie
