= Death of Ochanya Ogbanje =

2018 death of a Nigerian schoolgirl after rape

The death of Elizabeth Ochanya Ogbanje refers to the October 2018 death of a 13-year-old schoolgirl from Benue State, Nigeria, after years of sexual abuse that drew nationwide attention to child protection and prosecution of sexual offences. Ochanya died as a result of Vesicovaginal fistula (VVF) caused by alleged continuous rape by her uncle, Andrew Ogbuja and his son, Victor Ogbuja. Her case prompted protests, sustained media coverage, and recurring campaigns under the hashtag #JusticeForOchanya calling for accountability and systemic reforms.

== Background ==
Ochanya lived with relatives in Gboko/Makurdi to attend junior secondary school. Media investigations and police accounts later alleged prolonged sexual abuse by a university lecturer and his adult son, both related to her.

Reports stated that the abuse began when she was a child and continued for several years, leading to severe complications consistent with Vesicovaginal fistula (VVF). She died on 17 October 2018 in Makurdi after treatment efforts failed, a death widely linked in press coverage to the prolonged assaults.

== Investigation and legal proceedings ==
Following her death, arrests and multiple charges were brought. In April 2022, a Benue State High Court acquitted the lecturer, Andrew Ogbuja, of charges relating to rape and causing the death of Ochanya. His wife, Felicia Ochiga-Ogbuja, was convicted of negligence in an associated proceeding. The negligence conviction was later upheld by the Court of Appeal in Makurdi in November 2022.

Coverage has continued to note that the lecturer's son, Victor Ogbuja, alleged in reports to have repeatedly raped the child, remained at large for years after being declared wanted, with renewed calls for his arrest surfacing around anniversaries of the case.

== Public reaction ==
The case ignited protests in late 2018 and periodic surges of public advocacy in subsequent years. Civil society groups and media campaigns pressed for stronger child-protection enforcement and accountability for sexual violence, with recurring online mobilisation under #JusticeForOchanya.
