= Dahiru Yahaya =

Nigerian academic (1947–2021)

- Born: June 30, 1947; Kano, Nigeria
- Died: February 3, 2021 (aged 73); Kano
- Education: University of Birmingham; Ahmadu Bello University, Zaria
- Occupation: Professor
- Spouse: 3
- Children: 24

Dahiru Yahaya (30 June 1947 – 3 February 2021) was a Nigerian academic, educator and historian, who was professor of History, and head of the History Department of Bayero University, Kano.

== Early life and education ==
Dahiru was born in Kano, Nigeria in 1947. He attended Dawakin Kudu Junior and Wudil Senior Primary Schools, and received a certificate of education from Birnin Kudi Secondary School. In 1970 he earned a Bachelor of Arts degree in History with special honors from Abdullahi Bayero College, which is now Ahmadu Bello University Zaria. He then received a Doctor of Philosophy degree (Diplomatic History) at the University of Birmingham United Kingdom in 1975.

== Career ==
He started working as a Social Welfare Assistant under the Northern Regional Government in Kaduna. He also worked as the Administrative Officer under Kano State Government. Dahiru joined the Department of History Faculty of Arts and Islamic Studies Bayero University, Kano, in 1970 where he worked throughout his life.

In 2014, Dahiru lead a group of professors on a study tour of Iran that included the pilgrimage of Imam Ridha.

Dahiru was the first person to be honored with a Festschrift from Bayero University.

== Death ==
He died on Wednesday 3 February 2021 after a brief illness in Kano State, Nigeria. He was survived by three wives, 22 children and many grand children.
