= Alfred Friendly Foundation =

American nonprofit foundation

- Formation: 1984
- Founder: Alfred Friendly
- Purpose: Press fellowships
- Key people: Randall Smith (President)

The Alfred Friendly Foundation is an American nonprofit foundation that awards Alfred Friendly Press Fellowships to journalists from nations in the developing world. The program is offered annually to approximately 10 professional print journalists between the ages of 25 and 35, giving them a six-month, in-depth, practical introduction to the professional and ethical standards of the U.S. print media. It provides "hands-on training in U.S. and international newsrooms and within the Missouri School of Journalism."

The fellowships were created in 1984 by Alfred Friendly, a Pulitzer Prize-winning reporter and former managing editor of the Washington Post. Convinced that healthy democracies need strong, free media, Friendly conceived a fellowship program that would both impart American journalistic traditions and respond to worldwide interest in the dissemination of fair and accurate news.

The Daniel Pearl Foundation joined with AFPF in 2003 to offer special fellowships to honor the life and work of journalist Daniel Pearl. Daniel Pearl Fellows have been placed with the Washington, D.C. bureau of the Wall Street Journal, Los Angeles Times, Berkshire Eagle and North Adams Transcript.

== Leadership ==
=== Foundation staff and board directors ===
- Randall Smith (President)
- Jonathan Friendly (Chairman)
- Patrick J. Stueve (Treasurer)
- David J. Reed (Program Director)
- John Schirger (Director)
- Sridharan Ramakrishnan (Director)

=== Advisory board ===
- Joanna Ossinger
- Gilbert Bailón
- Kevin Drew
- Marina Walker Guevara
- Joseph Odindo
- Francesco Marconi
- Jackie Combs-Nelson
- Rob Eshman
- Teri Hayt
- Greg Victor
