= Kidnapping of Ese Oruru =

Kidnapping and rescue in Nigeria

- Location: Abduction: Yenagoa, Bayelsa State, Nigeria
- Date: 12 August 2015–29 February 2016
- Attack type: Kidnapping, child trafficking, statutory rape
- Victim: Ese Rita Oruru
- Perpetrator: Yunusa Dahiru (alias Yellow)

The kidnapping of Ese Rita Oruru, the youngest child of Charles Oruru and Rose Oruru, occurred on 12 August 2015 at her mother's shop in Yenagoa local government area, Bayelsa State. Ese, who was 13 years old at the time, was abducted by a man named Yunusa Dahiru (alias Yellow) and taken to Kano, where she was raped, forcibly Islamized and married off without her parents' consent. The conversion and marriage took place in the palace of the Emir of Kano, Sanusi Lamido Sanusi.

Ese's story first caught the attention of media outlets when her parents pleaded with the public for her release. Efforts to return the young teenager to her parents proved futile. However, on 29 February 2016, Ese was reported to have been rescued by Kano State Police and placed in custody of the Nigerian government. She was later revealed to be five months pregnant with her kidnapper's child after being released.

Various leaders, public figures and youth groups condemned Dahiru's actions. Human rights lawyer, Ebun Adegboruwa, called the incident a "clear case of child trafficking" and "a worse form of corruption."

Kano State government, through its Information, Youths and Sports Commissioner, Malam Garba, denied any involvement and demanded the culprit be prosecuted since the Constitution and Islamic teaching abhor abduction and forced marriage.

== Background ==
=== Oruru biography ===
Ese Rita Oruru was born on 22 February 2002 to parents Charles and Rose Oruru from Ughelli North, Delta State. She has three siblings, a sister Patricia and two brothers, Onome and Kevin. Her family lived in Opolo, Yenagoa in Bayelsa State, Nigeria, where her mother Mrs. Oruru operated her food vending business.

While growing up, Oruru became an active member in the Christian community. Her brother described her as "one of the strongest Scripture Union members; I know her very well. Then, she also used to tell me to come and join the SU. She did evangelism during break time most times."

Oruru was a JSS 3 student at Opolo Community Secondary School. A math lover, her career dream was to become a nurse. One of her school teachers, Mrs. Douye said she was brilliant and humble. She revealed that Oruru's abduction prevented her from participating in the Junior Secondary School Certificate Examination.

== Kidnapping and rescue ==
Yunusa Dahiru, a tricycle operator and member of the Hausa tribe kidnapped Ese Oruru on the night of 12 August 2015. Oruru, who was aged 13 at the time, was at her mother's shop while her parents had gone out. Dahiru thereafter transported Oruru to Kano State, and to the Emir's palace. He had claimed to traditional leaders in Kano that the teenager willingly followed him.

Oruru was forcibly converted to Islam, renamed "Aisha" and married off to Dahiru without her parents' permission. The whereabouts of the two were revealed the next day. On 14 August 2015, Mrs. Rose Oruru journeyed to Tufa village in Kura local government area. She was accosted by the village chief who informed her that her daughter was in the custody of the Emir. When she arrived there, she was approached by local Muslim youths who callously denied her entrance to the palace. She went back on 17 August, accompanied by an inspector and a police officer from Kwani Police Station. The police took her into the palace where the Emir of Kano sat in Council. There, she saw her daughter driven into the place in a black Sport utility vehicle (SUV) with two police escort and Dahiru.

From Kwani Police, the case was transferred to the Kano State Criminal Investigation Department (CID). Mrs. Rose Oruru was told to return to Bayelsa State and report the situation to the Yenagoa CID. Subsequent attempts to secure the release of Oruru proved abortive until 29 February 2016, when it was reported that she had been rescued by police following a massive campaign by The Punch which sparked national outrage. On 2 March 2016, Oruru and her mother were reunited in Abuja. Upon her arrival to the city, she was five months pregnant with Dahiru's child.

== Arraignment and pre-trial events ==
On 8 March 2016, Dahiru was arraigned in a Federal High Court in Yenagoa on a five-count indictment charging him with abduction, child trafficking, illicit sex, sexual exploitation and unlawful carnal knowledge. After hearing the charges, Dahiru pleaded not guilty before the court while the case was adjourned to 14 March. The presiding judge, Justice H.A. Nganjiwa, ruled that Dahiru should be remanded in prison custody until the formal adjourned date. On 14 March, counsel for the prosecution, Kenneth Dika served the Federal Court with an application to have Oruru's testimony heard behind closed doors. Dika stated that this was because the victim was a minor and deserved the court's protection. He also opposed an application for bail made by the defense counsel Kayode Olaoshebikan, arguing that it took the Nigerian police over six months to apprehend Dahiru and that if granted bail, the defendant, who was not resident within the court's jurisdiction, would most likely abscond. The matter was then adjourned until 21 March, with Dahiru sent back to prison custody.

=== Bail hearing ===
In the week following the adjournment, the court began hearing on the defendant's bail plea. Justice H.A. Nganjiwa said Dahiru should be granted a ₦3 million bail with two sureties in like sum. The sureties must be resident within the jurisdiction of the court while one must be a civil servant of not less than level 12 and the other a renowned title holder. Both must provide 3 years tax clearance certificate, while the public servant must also submit a letter of first appointment and last promotion letter. The court ordered further remand of Dahiru in prison custody pending when he would fulfil the bail conditions given.

Reacting to the decision, activist Annkio Briggs expressed her dissatisfaction at the performance of the prosecution. She called on the police to "live up to expectation" and bring in more lawyers to strengthen the legal team to prosecute the case.

=== Conclusion of trial and judgment ===
At last, on 21 May 2020, the Federal Hugh Court before which the defendant Dahiru was charged finally handed down judgment in the case. Dahiru was found guilty of the charge and sentenced to twenty-six years imprisonment.
