= Floating building =

Building created to float on water

Floating docks, Baltiysk

A floating building is a building unit with a flotation system at its base, allowing it to float on water. It is common to define such a building as being "permanently moored" and not usable in navigation. Floating buildings are usually towed into location by another vessel and are unable to move under their own power.

Floating buildings typically appear in land-constrained urban areas and regions, but they are also common in parts of Asia, where they serve as resorts and alternative accommodation for tourists.

== Typology ==
A houseboat in Middelburg, in the Netherlands, where floating homes are a common feature of canal towns and cities

Floating buildings and floating real estate developments serve several purposes. Residential floating real estate, such as floating houses and houseboats, accounts for the majority of floating buildings worldwide. Floating houses are especially common where there is sheltered water—lakes, canals, and protected harbours and bays—rather than open coasts. The best-known modern concentrations are in the Pacific Northwest of the United States and in the Netherlands. Seattle and Portland, Oregon, have large, long-established floating-home communities that grew out of nineteenth-century logging-camp dwellings. In the Netherlands, floating homes form a planning category of their own; Amsterdam has hundreds of houseboats lining its canals, and newer purpose-built floating neighbourhoods such as those at IJburg are explicitly promoted as a response to a water-rich, low-lying landscape.

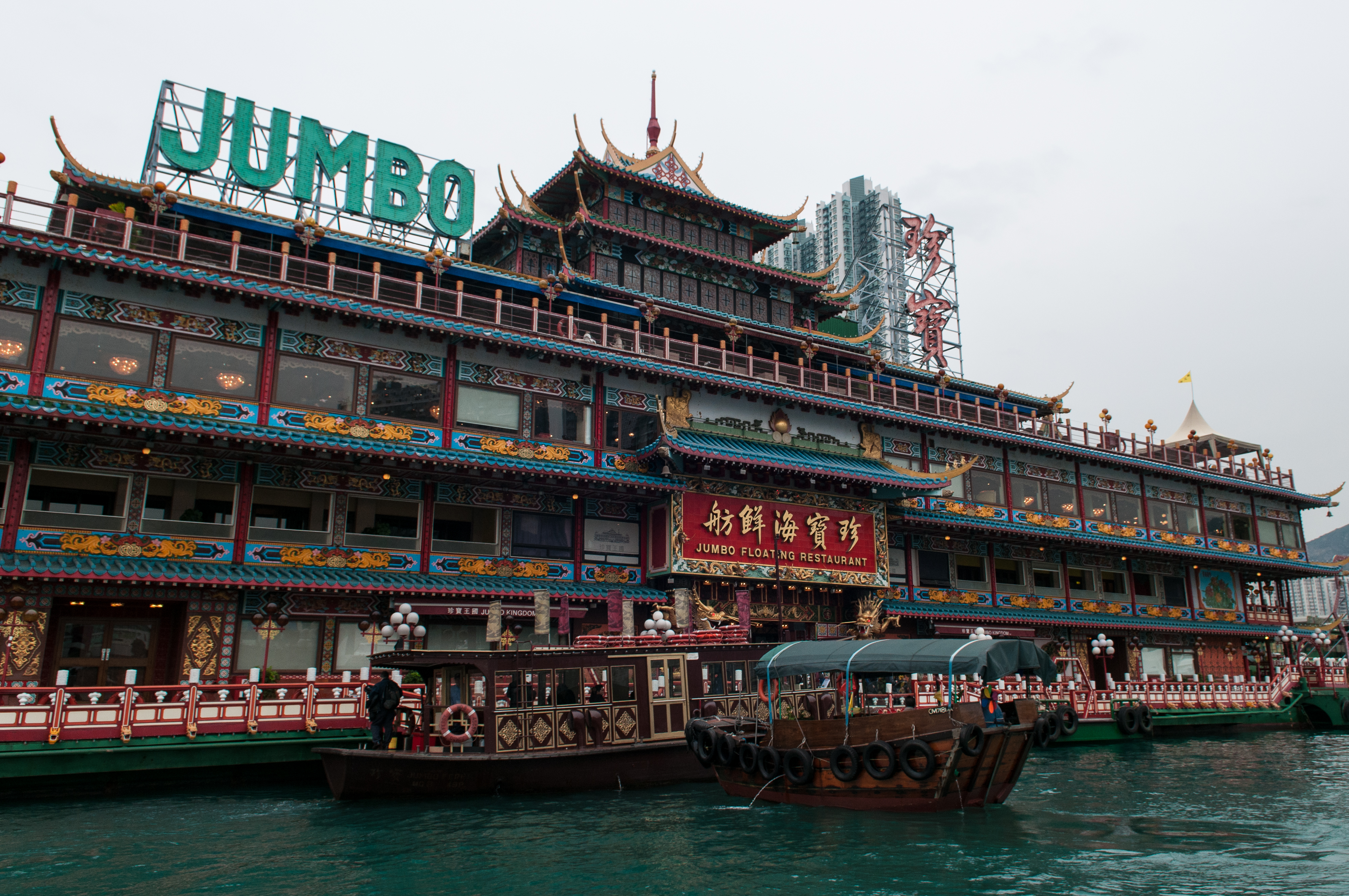
The Jumbo Floating Restaurant in Aberdeen Harbour, Hong Kong, one of the world's best-known floating restaurants (closed 2020)

Commercial and hospitality floating structures include hotels, restaurants, event spaces, offices, and resorts. The first purpose-built floating hotel, the Barrier Reef Floating Hotel, was moored on Australia's Great Barrier Reef in 1988 before later being relocated to Vietnam and then to North Korea, where it operated as the Hotel Haegumgang. Floating restaurants are the most globally widespread floating hospitality type, with numerous examples in Southeast Asian harbours and among the canal- and river-moored restaurant boats of European cities such as Amsterdam, Paris, London, and Hamburg. Commercial floating buildings also include floating bars, clubs, and event venues.

Industrial floating buildings and infrastructure include floating terminals, docks, and platforms. Floating docks and floating piers are standard in shipyards and ports worldwide, and floating breakwaters are common in ports that lack deep-water quays. Floating liquefied natural gas and oil terminals are also used where onshore or fixed facilities are impractical.

Public and civic developments also make use of floating solutions. Floating schools operate in several countries, including Nigeria—where the Makoko Floating School was built for a lagoon community in Lagos—and Bangladesh. In Bangladesh, the organisation Shidhulai Swanirvar Sangstha runs a fleet of solar-powered boats that serve as floating schools, libraries, and health clinics for communities cut off by seasonal flooding.

== History ==
Floating developments have a long history, and the origins of floating real estate date back more than 2,000 years. An early example is the Thalamegos, a giant Nile vessel dating to the 2nd century BC and built for Ptolemy IV Philopator, the fourth pharaoh of Ptolemaic Egypt. The vessel was built for leisure and served as a setting for dining, socialising, and dealmaking.

"Tryokhgorny" floating terminal, Moscow

Contemporary floating real estate and floating houses emerged at the end of the 19th century. The first modern floating homes were built in the late 1800s to accommodate workers living in logging camps, using materials readily at hand such as discarded cedar logs, retired barges, boat hulls, and log rafts.

By the early 20th century the floating-accommodation market had begun to split along social lines: working-class fishermen, boatbuilders, and labourers on one side, and wealthy families using floating homes as summer retreats on Lake Washington on the other.

From the 1960s onward, floating-home communities in some Western cities came under pressure from regulation, in part over sewage and pollution concerns, leading to conflict between officials and residents.

== Functionality ==
Floating houses, Malaysia

Floating buildings typically float by one of two approaches: a watertight buoyant basement or hull that displaces water directly, or discrete pontoon units attached beneath a more conventional-looking structure.

A common core material for floating developments is expanded polystyrene foam, sometimes encapsulated in fibreglass or concrete shells, or steel-reinforced concrete for durability. Alternative materials include high-density polyethylene (HDPE) tubing and composite laminates.

== Market outlook ==
Demand for floating housing has been linked to continued urban expansion and to the growing need for flood-resilient housing, and floating and amphibious housing is increasingly promoted as a coastal climate change adaptation strategy.

Floating renewable energy, particularly floating solar power, has grown rapidly and has been identified as a driver of wider interest in floating infrastructure. A 2019 World Bank and ESMAP study estimated a conservative global potential of about 400 gigawatts of floating solar on man-made water bodies—comparable to the total installed capacity of all solar photovoltaics worldwide at the time—and noted the sector's rapid expansion.

== Environmental impact ==
Houseboat, Port of Copenhagen

Floating buildings have environmental benefits such as being unsusceptible to changes in sea level, and minimising disturbance to the ecology of the harbour or seabed. They can be built off-site and then towed into location, minimising disturbance to the build site. If a building is decommissioned, it can be relocated elsewhere. The ecological footprint of floating real estate has been described as lower than that of comparable land-based development, mainly because it avoids the need for land reclamation.

== Notable examples of floating buildings ==
- Jumbo Kingdom
- Al-Rahmah Mosque
- Wagner Houseboat
- Kampong Luong
- Makoko Floating School
- Evergreen Point Floating Bridge
- Lake Palace
- Floating Farm

== See also ==
- Very large floating structure
- Houseboat
