= Bunmi Banjo =

Technology specialist

- Born: Olúbùnmi Bánjọ; Charlemagne, Quebec, Canada
- Other name: Max Pense
- Education: Kellogg School of Management, University of Toronto
- Occupations: Business executive, writer
- Employer: Google

Bunmi Banjo is a technology leadership and future of work speaker and adviser. She is also the founder and CEO of Kuvora Inc. Bunmi was previously responsible for Google's Brand and Reputation in Africa where she led the company's effort to provide digital skills to millions of youths across the continent. She is on the advisory board of the Center for Excellence in Data for Society, University of Arizona.

== Early life and education ==
Bunmi was born in Canada to Nigerian parents from Ijebu, Ogun State, Nigeria, and is the eldest of three children. She attended the Federal Government Academy, Suleja where she was a member of the inaugural class of Nigeria's secondary school program for gifted and talented pupils.

Bunmi attained a Bachelor's degree in Psychology in 2000 from The University of Toronto and an MBA in 2007 from the Kellogg School of Management at Northwestern University.

== Work experience ==
Bunmi's early career work included stints at Chevron Corporation, Discover Financial Services, and TD Canada Trust.

In 2012, she joined Google where she currently leads the company's effort to train millions of people through Google's Digital Skills for Africa programme.

Bunmi has also been widely quoted by the media including CNN, Al Jazeera network, CNBC Africa, Financial Times, This Day, The Punch, and The Guardian (Nigeria) newspapers.

Bunmi is listed as one of the co-founders and CMO of an entertainment booking platform called Fezah.

== Google's Digital Outreach in Africa ==
At a press conference in Johannesburg in April 2016, Google announced plans to train 1 million Africans in digital skills within one year. Through a partnership with Livity Africa's "Digify Africa" programme, plans were put in place around the continent to identify relevant populations for training and support, delivering "practical learning experiences that lead directly to in-demand jobs in the digital economy, or help launch small enterprises."

Bunmi is the head of the program across the continent, and had this to say about the experience: "People across Africa are thirsty to explore how to take better advantage of the internet and the opportunities it offers."

In March 2017, Google met its goal and committed to training one million more. For this Google intends to "add countries and regions to Digital Skills for Africa" and include "more offline versions of online training materials for low net access areas". The program will also be offered in "new languages, such as Swahili,IsiZulu, and Hausa."

== See also ==
- Rimini Makama
- Mark Essien
- Ade Olufeko
- Susan Oguya
