= Foundation (engineering) =

Lowest and supporting layer of a structure

In engineering, a foundation is the element of a structure that connects it to the ground, or more rarely water (as with floating structures), transferring loads from the structure to the ground. Foundations are generally considered either shallow or deep. Foundation engineering is the application of soil mechanics and rock mechanics (geotechnical engineering) in the design of foundation elements of structures.

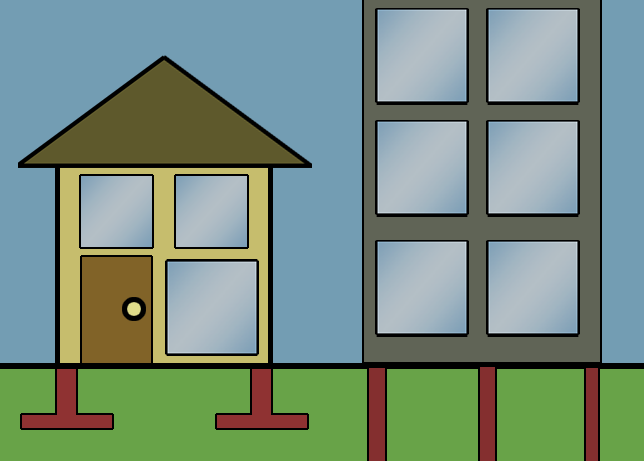
Shallow foundations of a house and the deep foundations of a skyscraper

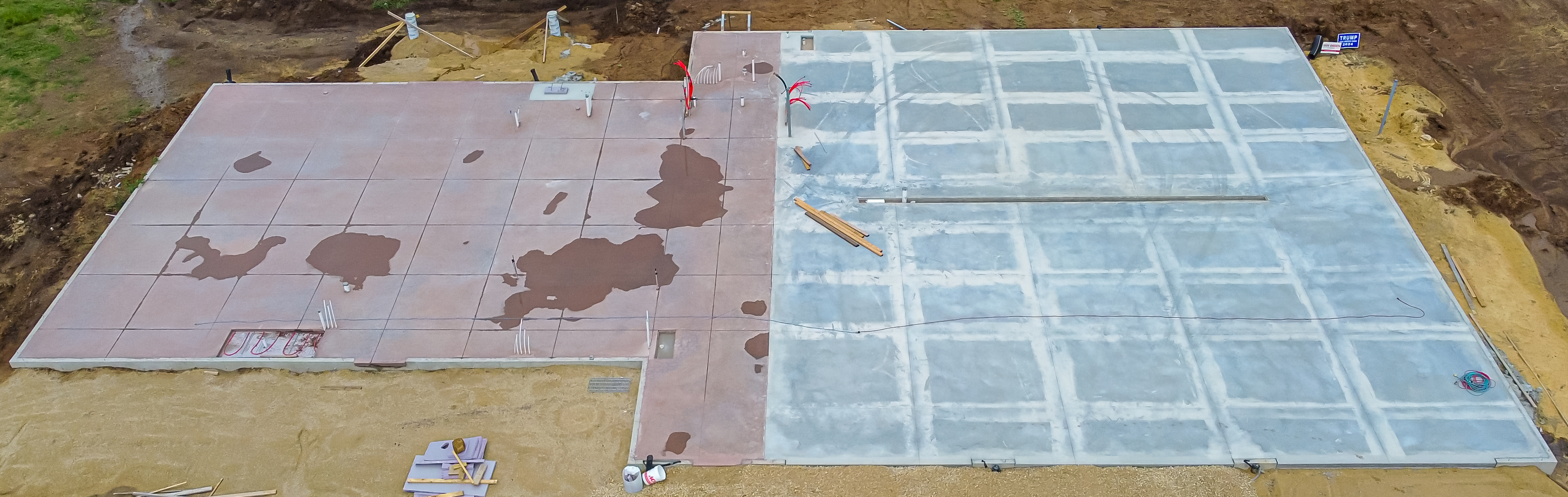
A foundation with pipe fixtures coming through the sleeves

== Purpose ==
Foundations provide the structure's stability from the ground:

- To distribute the weight of the structure over a large area in order to avoid overloading the underlying soil (possibly causing unequal settlement).
- To anchor the structure against natural forces including earthquakes, floods, droughts, frost heaves, tornadoes and wind.
- To provide a level surface for construction.
- To anchor the structure deeply into the ground, increasing its stability and preventing overloading.
- To prevent lateral movements of the supported structure (in some cases).

== Requirements of a good foundation ==
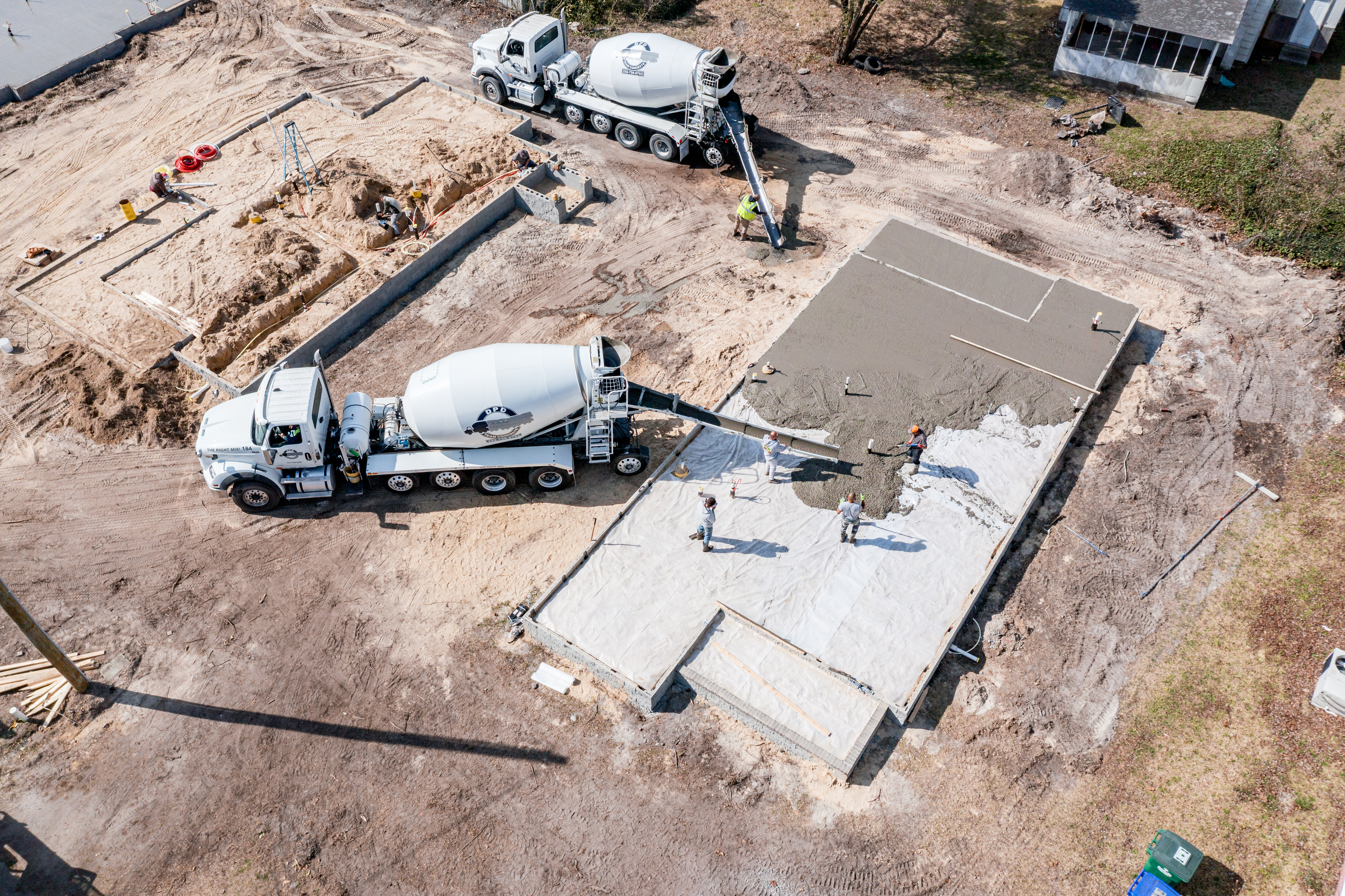
Pouring a concrete foundation

The design and the construction of a well-performing foundation must possess some basic requirements:

- The design and the construction of the foundation is done such that it can sustain as well as transmit the dead and the imposed loads to the soil. This transfer has to be carried out without resulting in any form of settlement that can cause stability issues for the structure.
- Differential settlements can be avoided by having a rigid base for the foundation. These issues are more pronounced in areas where the superimposed loads are not uniform in nature.
- Based on the soil and area it is recommended to have a deeper foundation so that it can guard against any form of damage or distress. These are mainly caused by the problem of shrinkage and swelling because of temperature changes.
- The location of the foundation chosen must be an area that is not affected or influenced by future works or factors.

== Historic types ==
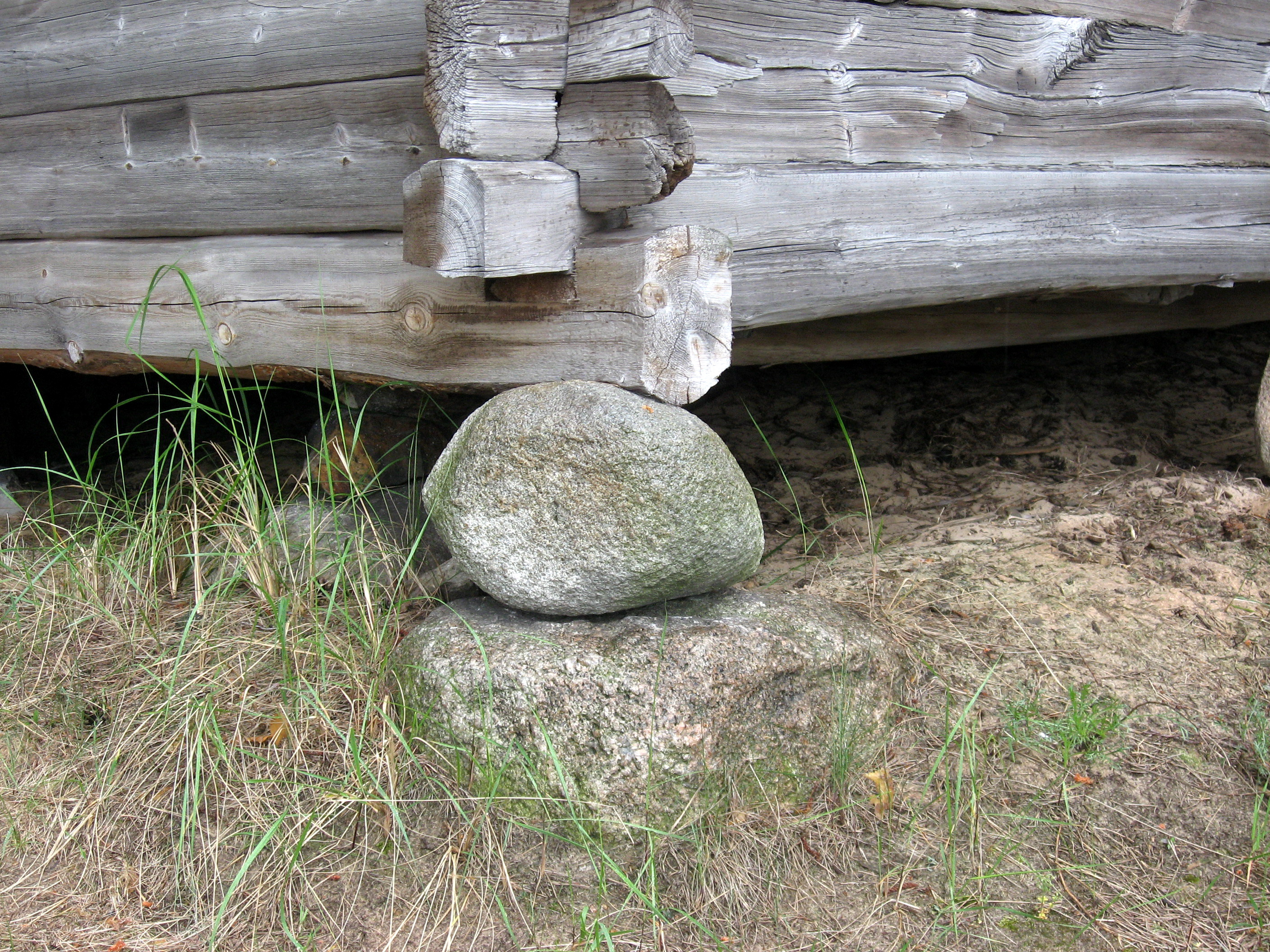
The simplest foundation, a padstone. The Ethnographic Open-Air Museum of Latvia

=== Earthfast or post in ground construction ===
Buildings and structures have a long history of being built with wood in contact with the ground. Post in ground construction may technically have no foundation. Timber pilings were used on soft or wet ground even below stone or masonry walls. In marine construction and bridge building a crisscross of timbers or steel beams in concrete is called grillage.

=== Padstones ===
Perhaps the simplest foundation is the padstone, a single stone which both spreads the weight on the ground and raises the timber off the ground. Staddle stones are a specific type of padstone.

=== Stone foundations ===
Dry stone and stones laid in mortar to build foundations are common in many parts of the world. Dry laid stone foundations may have been painted with mortar after construction. Sometimes the top, visible course of stone is hewn, quarried stones. Besides using mortar, stones can also be put in a gabion. One disadvantage is that if using regular steel rebar, the gabion will not last as long as when using mortar, due to rusting. Using weathering steel rebar can reduce this disadvantage somewhat.

=== Rubble-trench foundations ===
Rubble trench foundations are a shallow trench filled with rubble or stones. These foundations extend below the frost line and may have a drain pipe which helps groundwater drain away. They are suitable for soils with a capacity of more than 10 tonnes/m^{2} (2,000 pounds per square foot).

== Gallery of shallow foundation types ==
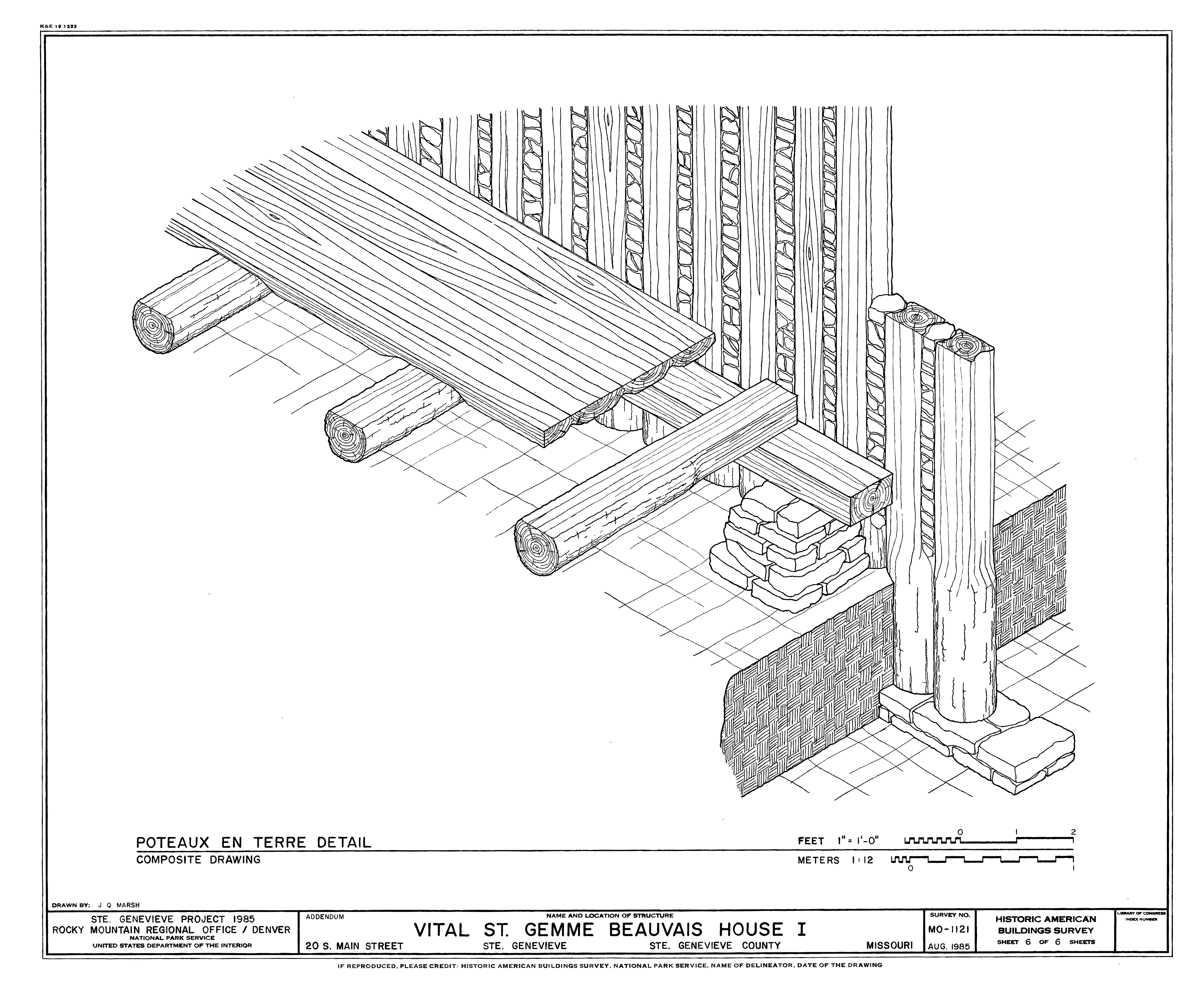
Drawing of Poteaux-en-Terre post in ground type of wall construction (this example technically called pallisade construction) in the Beauvais House in Ste Genevieve, Missouri

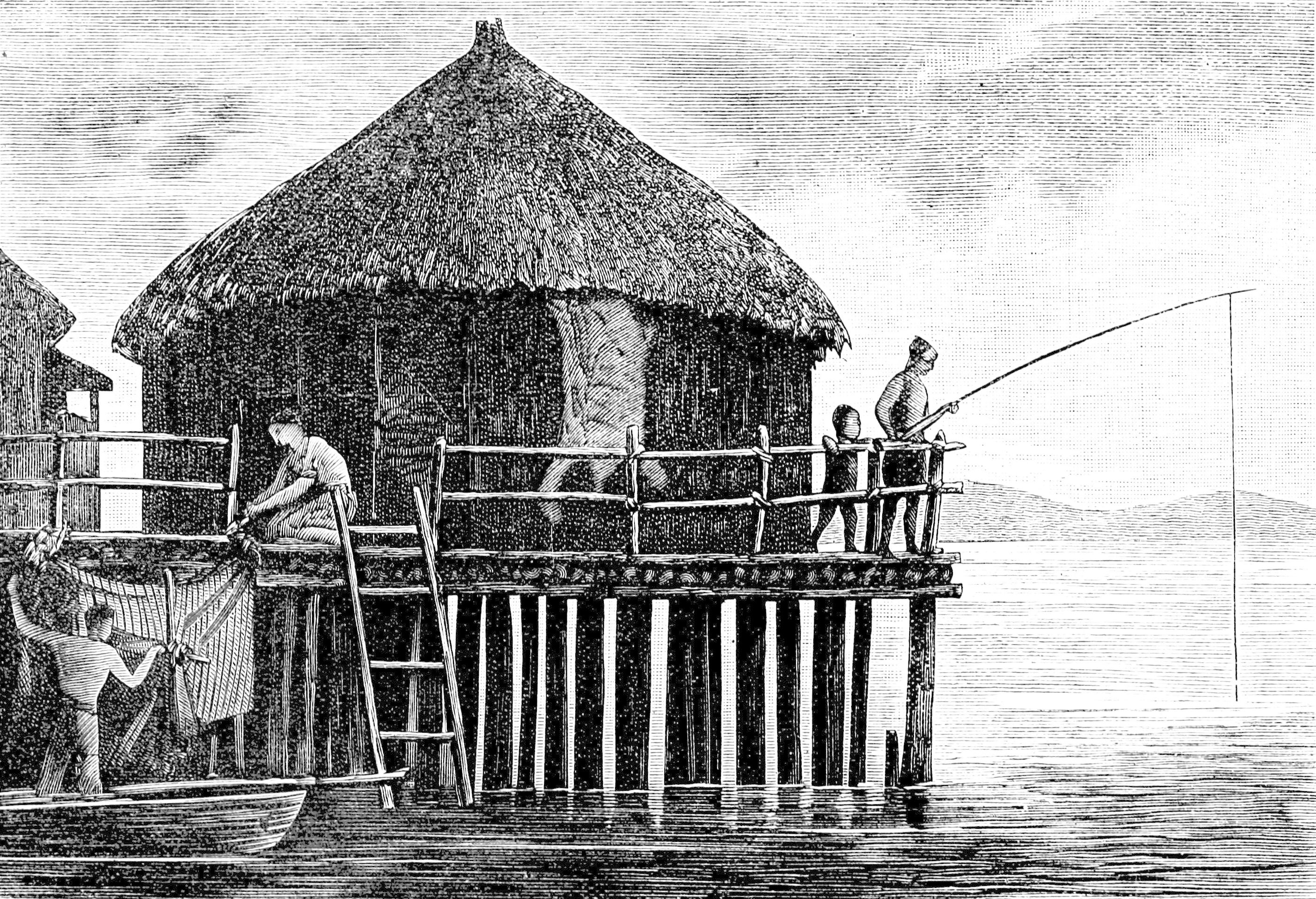
PSM V24 D321 A primitive stilt house in Switzerland on wood pilings.

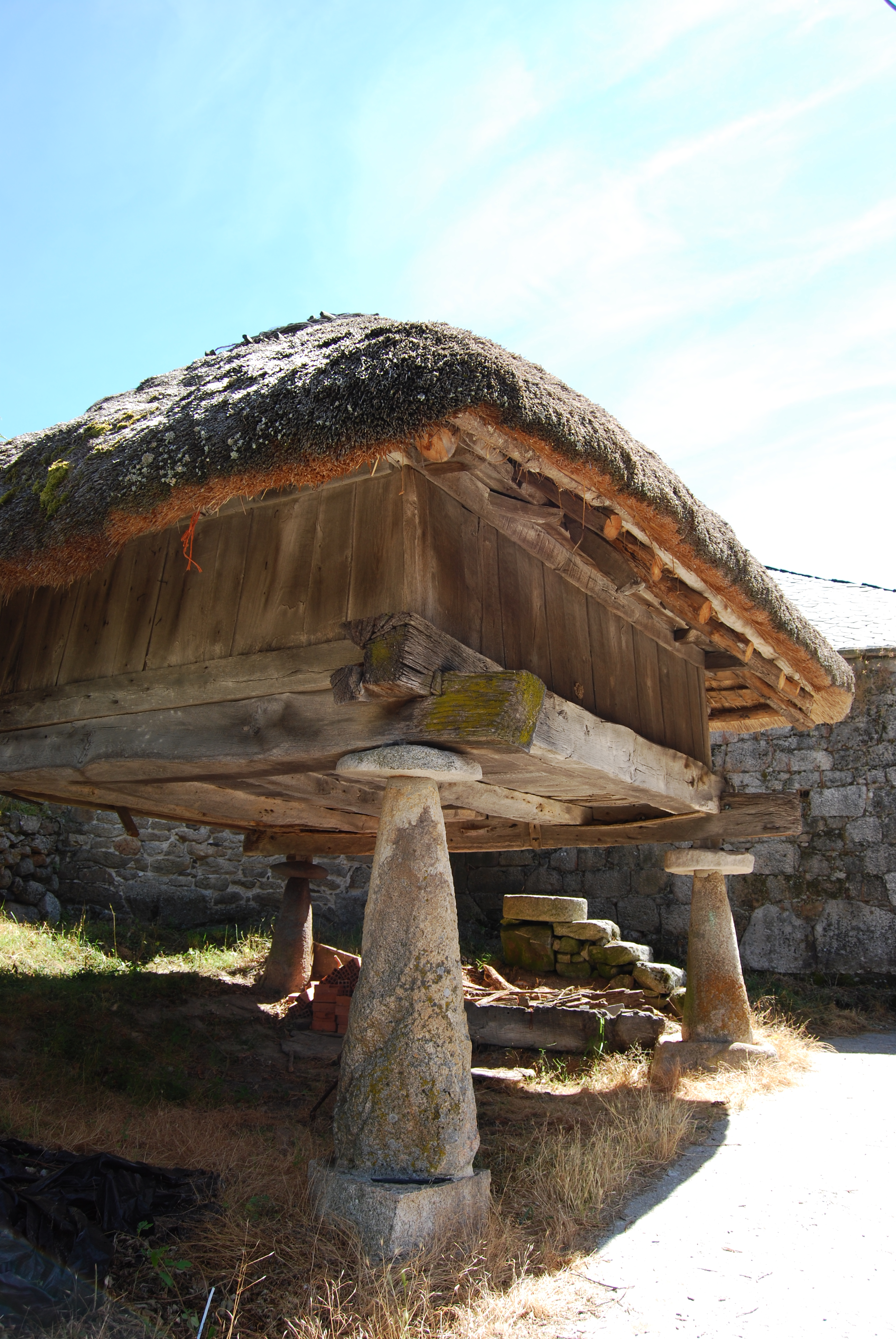
A granary on staddle stones, a type of padstone

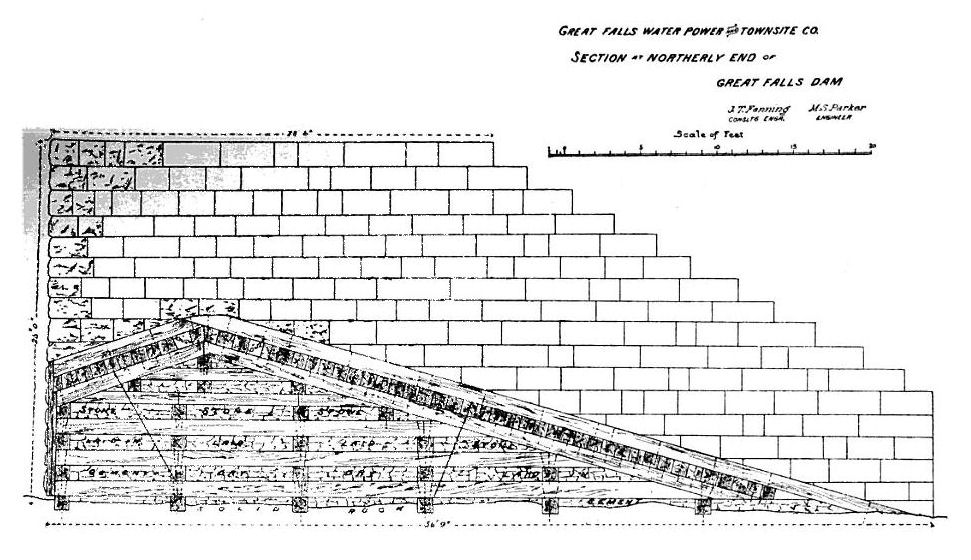
Black Eagle Dam – cross-section of construction plans for 1892 structure

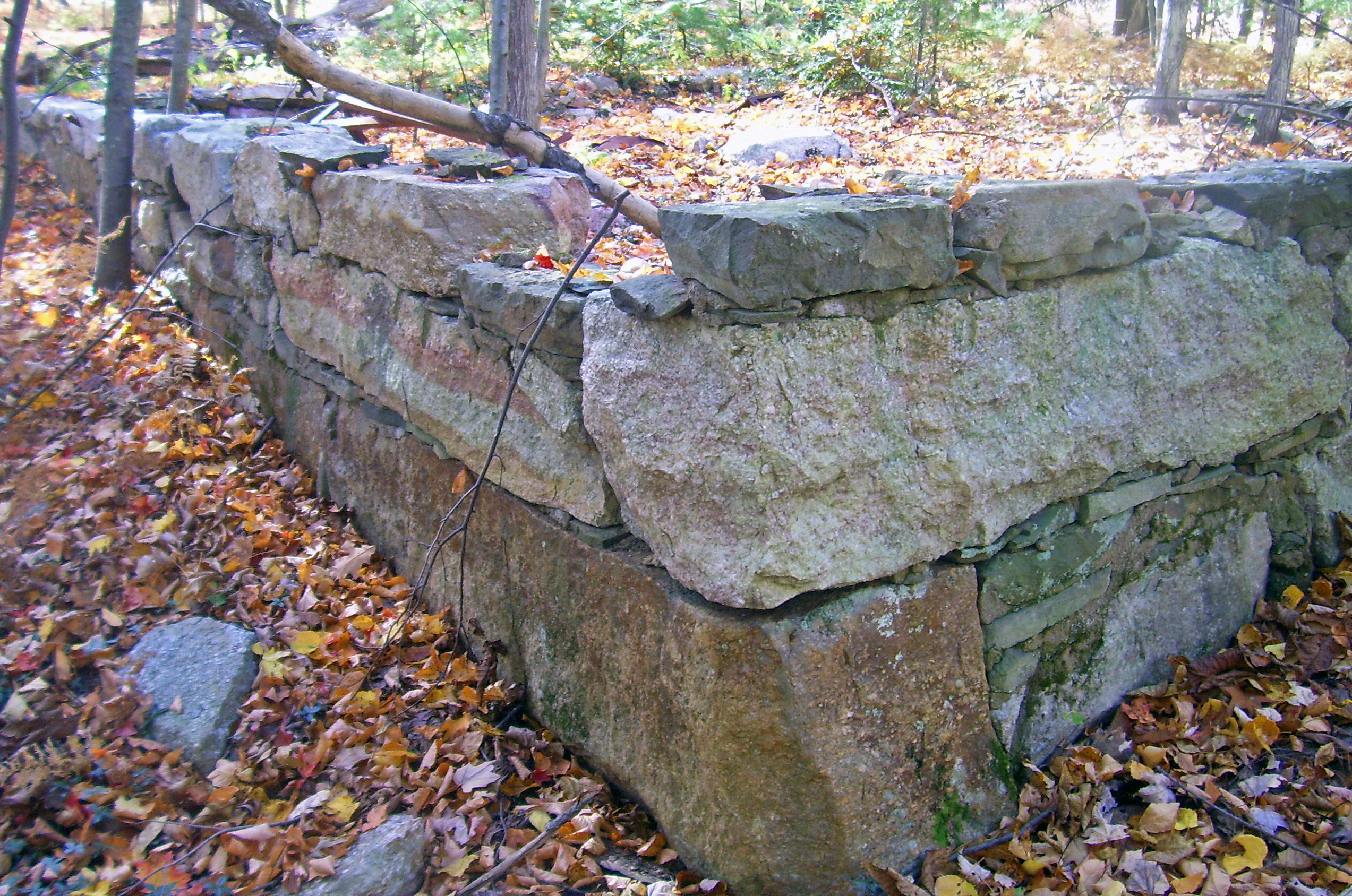
Davis House dry-laid stone foundation ruin, Gardiner, NY

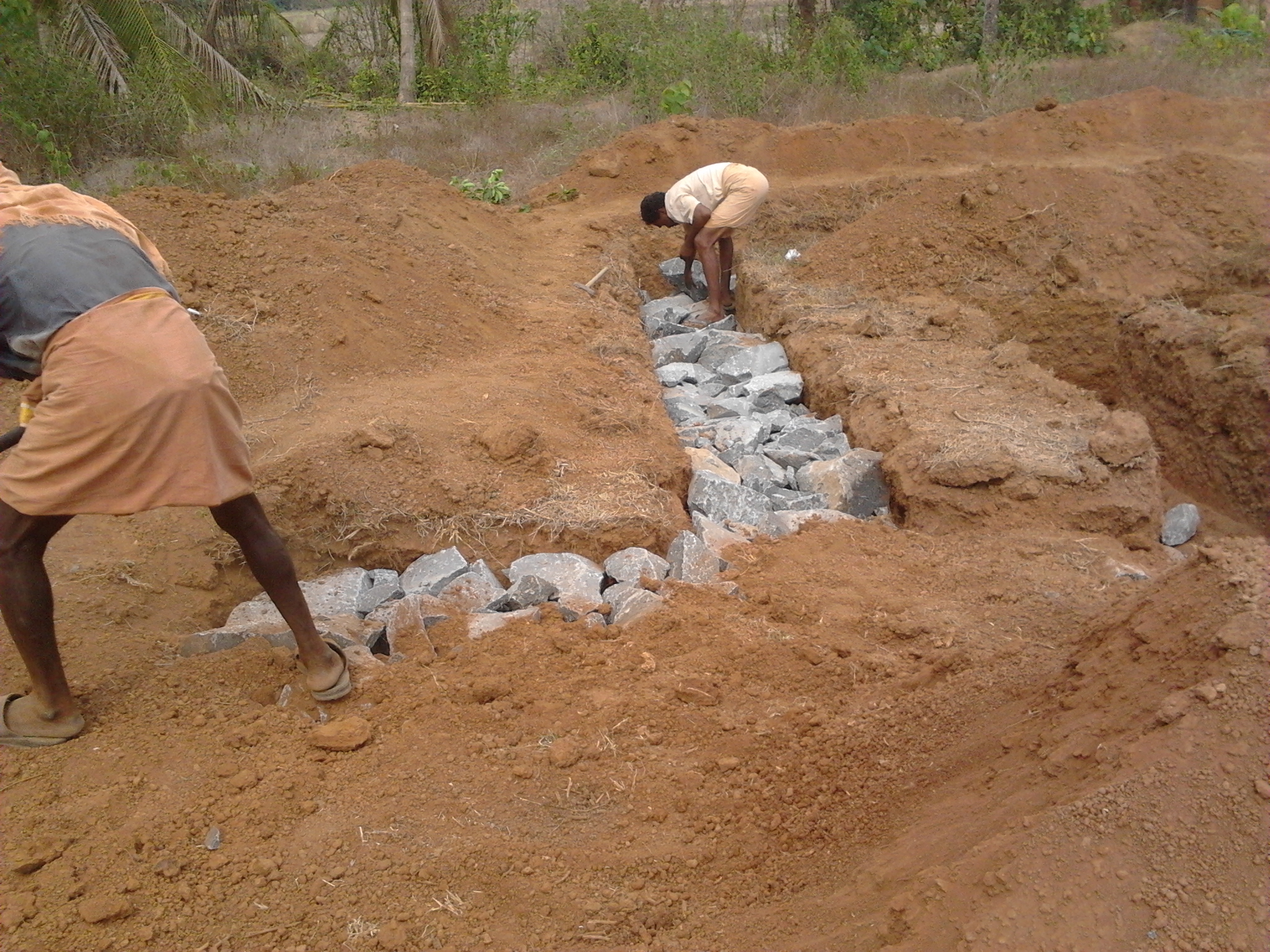
A basic type of rubble trench foundation

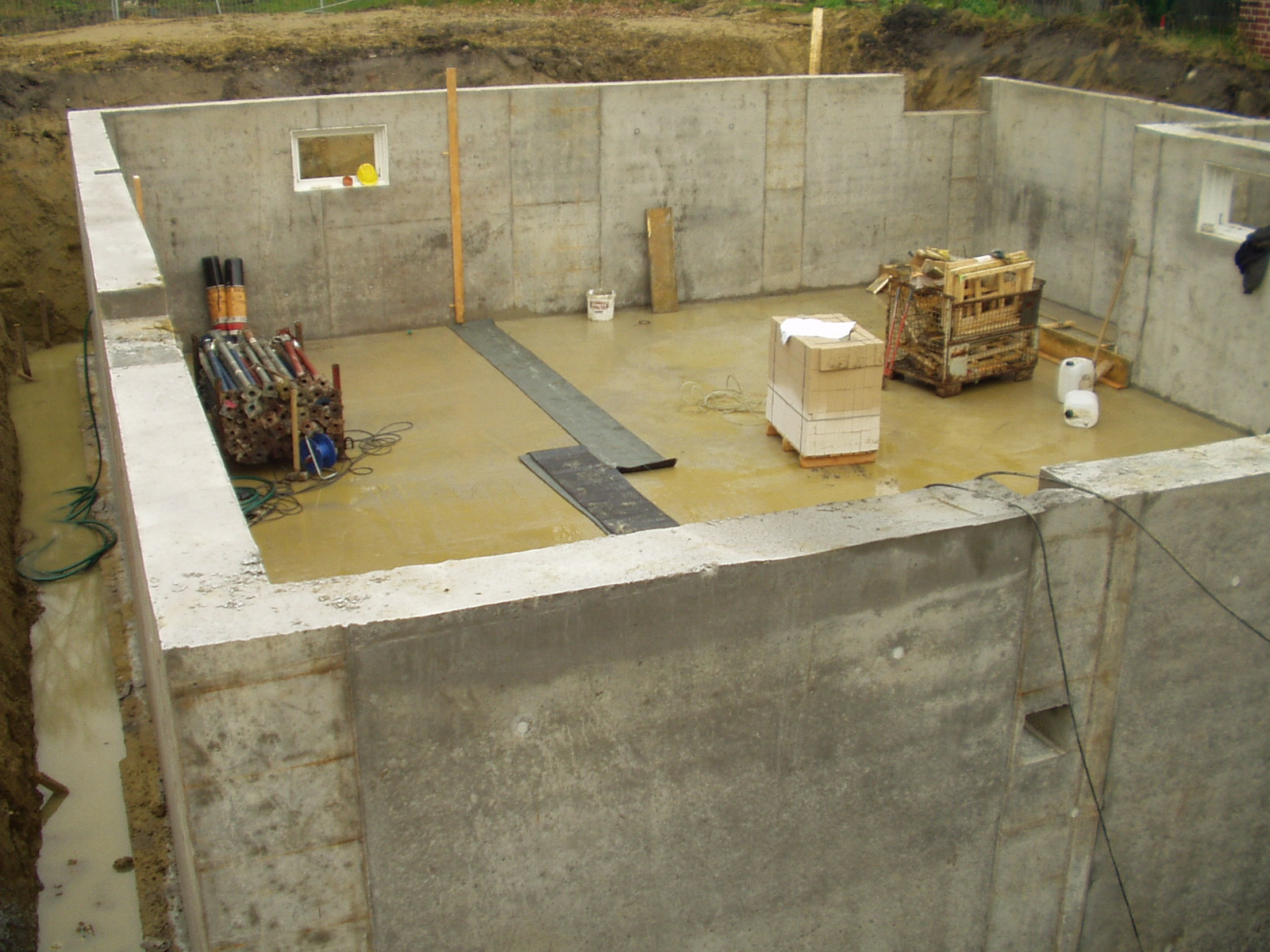
Typical residential poured concrete foundation, except for the lack of anchor bolts. The concrete walls are supported on continuous footings and there is a concrete slab floor. There is standing water in the perimeter French drain trenches.

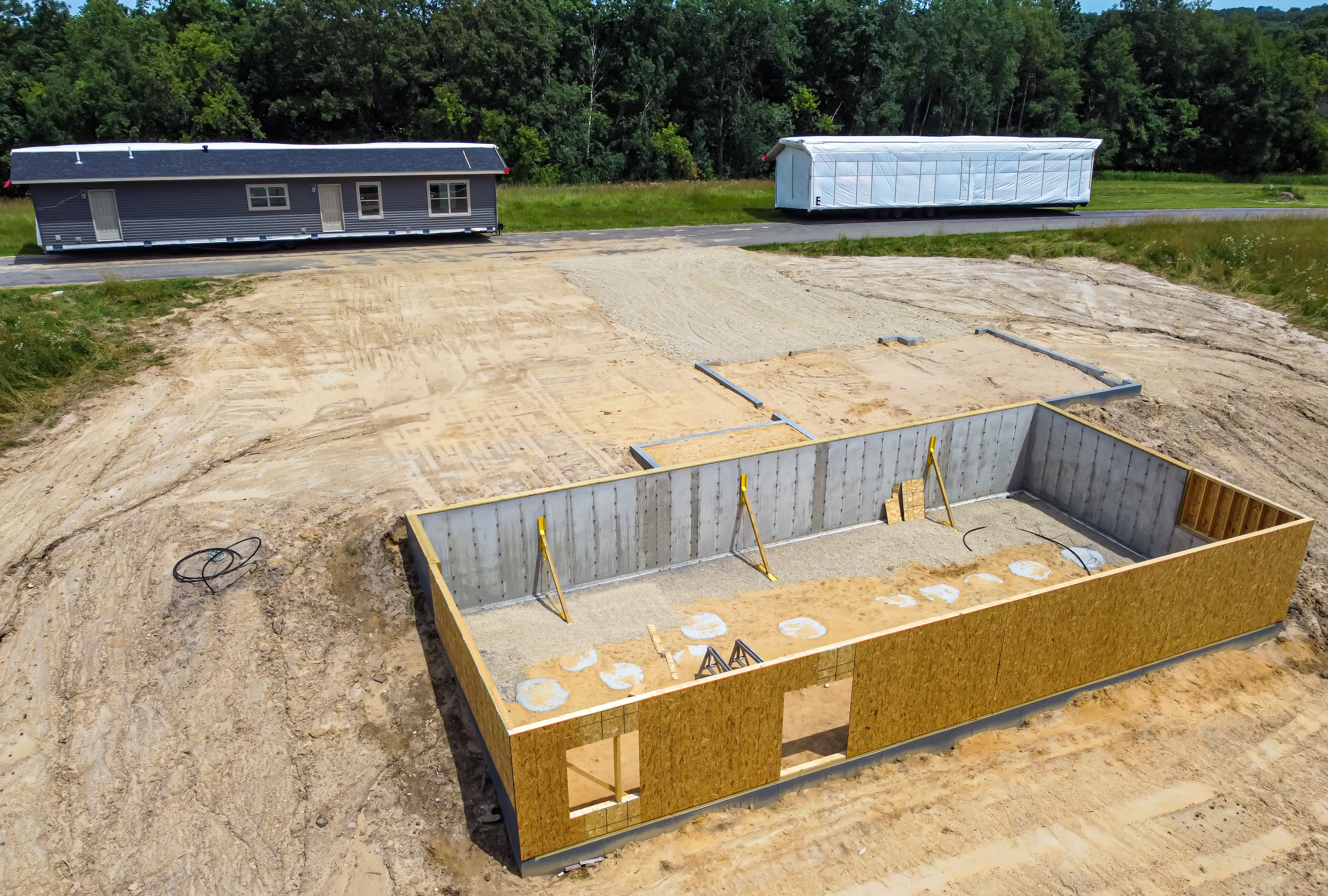
Modular building to be placed on the foundation

== Modern types ==
=== Shallow foundations ===
Shallow foundation construction example

Often called footings, are usually embedded about a meter or so into soil. One common type is the spread footing which consists of strips or pads of concrete (or other materials) that extend below the frost line and transfer the weight from walls and columns to the soil or bedrock.

Another common type of shallow foundation is the slab-on-grade foundation where the weight of the structure is transferred to the soil through a concrete slab placed at the surface. Slab-on-grade foundations can be reinforced mat slabs, which range from 25 cm to several meters thick, depending on the size of the building, or post-tensioned slabs, which are typically at least 20 cm for houses, and thicker for heavier structures.

Another way to install ready-to-build foundations that is more environmentally friendly is to use screw piles. Screw pile installations have also extended to residential applications, with many homeowners choosing a screw pile foundation over other options. Some common applications for helical pile foundations include wooden decks, fences, garden houses, pergolas, and carports.

Roads may be regarded as a type of shallow foundation, as they transfer loads from traffic to the underlying ground at relatively shallow depths. Understanding the interaction between the pavement structure and subgrade soil is therefore essential for ensuring long-term performance and stability. Modern foundation engineering increasingly incorporates field-based and analytical approaches to better capture soil behaviour under realistic loading conditions. The use of portable in-situ testing devices, such as the lightweight deflectometer (LWD), has enabled improved estimation of soil stiffness and deformation characteristics directly in the field. These measurements can be integrated into design frameworks to enhance the accuracy of foundation performance predictions.

=== Deep foundations ===
Used to transfer the load of a structure down through the upper weak layer of topsoil to the stronger layer of subsoil below. There are different types of deep footings including impact-driven piles, drilled shafts, caissons, screw piles, geo-piers and earth-stabilized columns. The naming conventions for different types of footings vary between different engineers. Historically, piles were wood, later steel, reinforced concrete, and pre-tensioned concrete.

==== Monopile foundation ====
A type of deep foundation which uses a single, generally large-diameter, structural element embedded into the earth to support all the loads (weight, wind, etc.) of a large above-surface structure.

Many monopile foundations have been used in recent years for economically constructing fixed-bottom offshore wind farms in shallow-water subsea locations. For example, a single wind farm off the coast of England went online in 2008 with over 100 turbines, each mounted on a 4.74-meter-diameter monopile footing in ocean depths up to 16 meters of water.

=== Floating barge ===
A floating foundation sits on a body of water, rather than dry land. This type of foundation is used for some bridges and floating buildings.

== Design ==
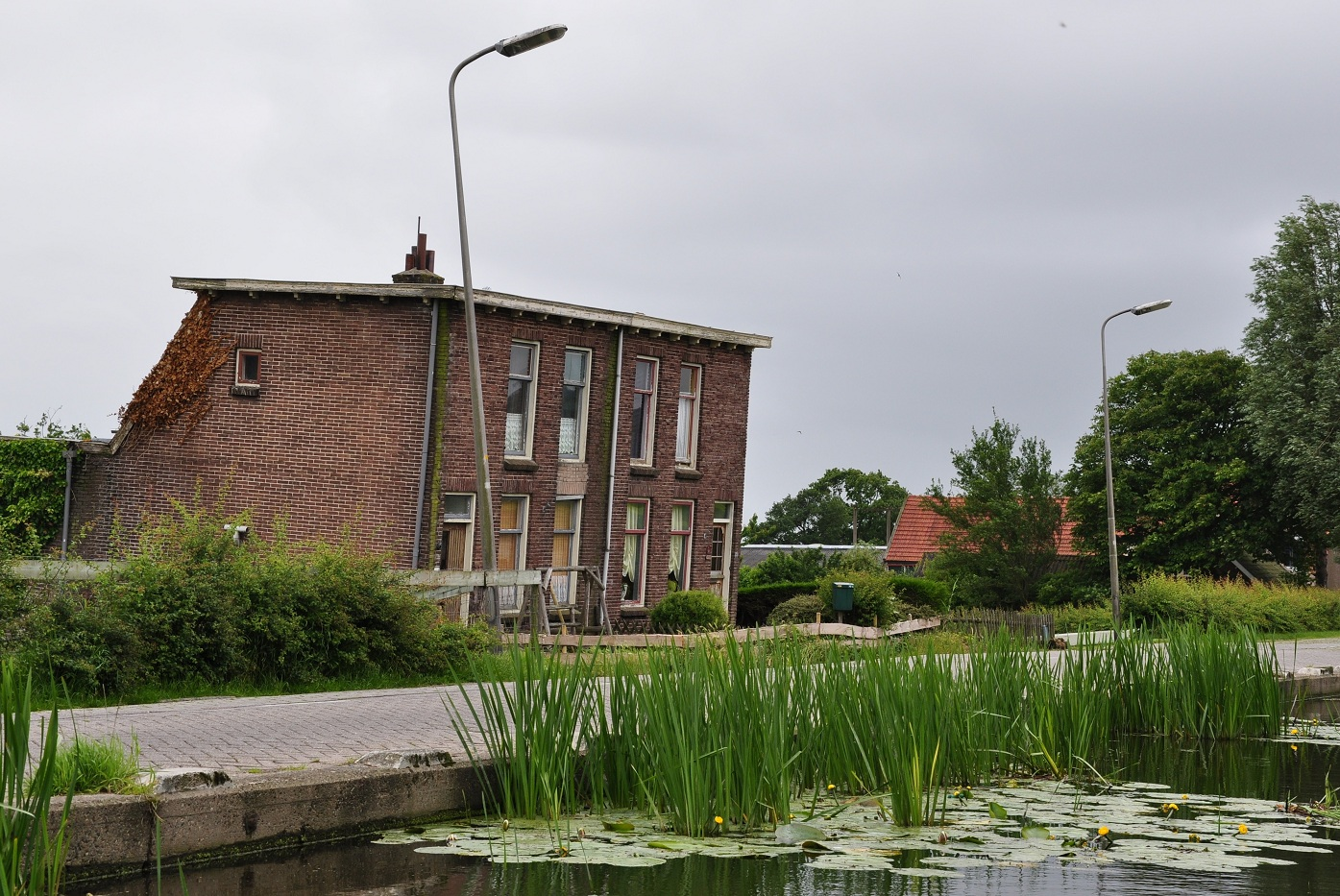
Inadequate foundations in muddy soils below sea level caused these houses in the Netherlands to subside.

Foundations are designed to have an adequate load capacity depending on the type of subsoil/rock supporting the foundation by a geotechnical engineer, and the footing itself may be designed structurally by a structural engineer. The primary design concerns are settlement and bearing capacity. When considering settlement, total settlement and differential settlement are normally considered. Differential settlement is when one part of a foundation settles more than another part. This can cause problems to the structure which the foundation is supporting. Expansive clay soils can also cause problems.

== See also ==
- Underpinning
- Structural settlement
- Interference of the footings
- Foundation (cosmetics)
