= Sevanan Business School =

- Type: Private school
- Active: 2015–2022
- Location: Zurich, Switzerland; 47.4179°N 8.5588°E

Sevanan Business School was a Swiss private business school. It offered management courses at undergraduate level and Masters level, accredited to London School of Marketing. Sevanan Business School provided international programs in business management & marketing management. There is suspicion the school closed with regards on being a part of diploma mills. The school was located at the World Trade Center in Zurich, Switzerland.

== Brief history ==
As of 2022, none affective campus and students can be tracked for this school.

== Academic programs ==
Sevanan Business School offered a variety of programs. All academic programs were taught in English. SBS delivers undergraduate, graduate and diploma programs such as Bachelor, Master and diploma degrees. Undergraduate and graduate programs were proposed in Business Management and Marketing Management. Top-Up stage programs are offered by London School of Marketing and awarded by Anglia Ruskin University.

== Academic partners ==
- London School of Marketing
