= Interference of the footings =

Phenomenon

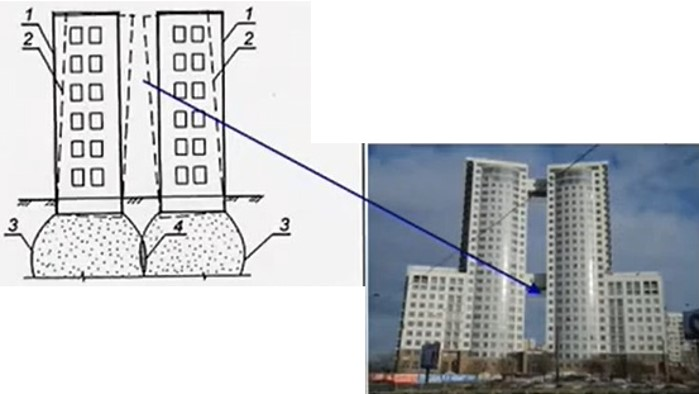
Interference of the footings.

The Interference of the footings is a phenomenon that is observed when two footings are closely spaced. The buildings when are to be constructed nearby to each other, the architectural requirements or the less availability of space for the construction forces the engineers to place the foundation footings close to each other, and when foundations are placed close to each other with similar soil conditions, the Ultimate Bearing Capacity of each foundation may change due to the interference effect of the failure surface in the soil.

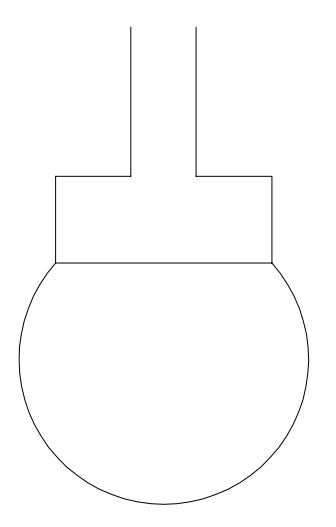
The figure illustrates stress isobar of an isolated footing carrying structural load.

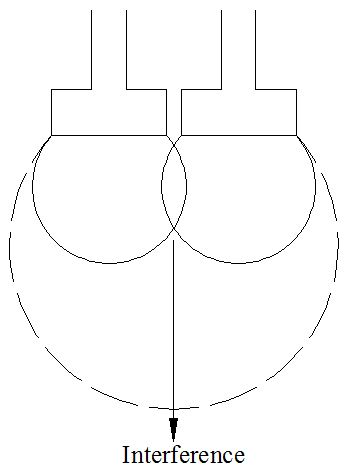
The figure illustrates the isobars when two footings carrying structural load placed close to each other. Due to interference the stress isobars of individual interacting footings coalesce to form a single isobar of larger dimensions altering the characteristic behaviour of an isolated footing.

== Introduction ==
Foundations or group of foundations are important components of the structure through which the superficial structural loads are transmitted to the underlying foundation soil or bed on which the foundations are laid. The structural loads are transmitted to the foundation soil safely such that neither the foundation fail nor the foundation soil fails either in shear or in excessive settlement. The foundations are basically designed based on two criteria namely Bearing Capacity and Settlement criterion. Many classical theories have been postulated for the isolated foundations by many pioneers like Terzhagi (1943), Meyerhoff (1963), Hansen (1970) and Vesic (1973). In general as per the Terzaghi (1943), when an isolated shallow foundation is loaded, the stress or the failure zone in the foundation soil extends in horizontal direction on either side of the footing to about twice the width of the footing and in vertical downward direction to about three times the width of the footing. Unless until the stress or failure zone of individual footings do not interfere, the individual footings behave as an isolated footing. However, in many a situations such as lack of construction space, structural restrictions, rapid urbanization, architecture of the building, structures close to each other etc. In such situations the foundations or group of foundations may be placed close to each other. In such cases the stress isobars or the failure zone of closely spaced isolated footings may interfere with each other leading to the phenomenon called Interference. Owing to the phenomenon of footing interference, the failure mechanism, load-settlement, bearing capacity, settlement, rotational characteristics etc. of an isolated footing may be altered and therefore the classical theories as postulated in the literature for isolated footings cannot be applied. Due to interference the stress isobars of individual interacting footings coalesce to form a single isobar of larger dimensions altering the characteristic behavior of an isolated footing. Therefore, the study of interference of closely spaced footings is one of the significant practical importances.

== Previous studies ==
Stuart was the first pioneer to study the interference phenomenon of closely spaced surface strip footing. He examined the effect of footing interference on ultimate bearing capacity of strip footings by theoretical analysis using limit equilibrium method, assuming a non-linear failure surface wherein the cross-section composed of logarithmic spiral and straight line portion tangent to the curvilinear portion. Further Stuart (1962) carried out few small-scale laboratory experiments and compared the results of theoretical analysis with that of the experimental results and concluded that the ultimate bearing capacity of two interfering footings increase with decrease in spacing between the footings and attains a peak magnitude at some spacing termed as critical spacing. The study of Stuart (1962) was further extended by West and Stuart (1965) by performing a series of small-scale laboratory tests to examine the effect of interference on bearing capacity of strip footings resting on the surface of cohesion-less soil bed. Moreover, West and Stuart (1965) carried out few theoretical analyses using method of stress characteristics to observe the eccentricity of load and reactions at the base of footing resulting from interference effect for footings resting on the surface of sand. The results obtained from this theory were smaller than those observed by Stuart (1962) using limit equilibrium method; however the trend was similar to the variation as observed by Stuart (1962) and the results obtained by experiments reasonably matched with those of the theoretical analysis. The researchers carried out the study by theoretical or numerical techniques for interfering footings by making use of the following methods : Method of stress characteristics, Analytical method, Probabilistic approach, Upper bound limits analysis, Lower bound limits analysis, Finite element method, Finite difference method, Distinct element method.

== Observed results ==
The bearing capacity of soil is influenced by many factors for instance soil strength, foundation width and depth, soil weight and surcharge, and spacing between foundations. These factors are related to the loads exerted on the soil and considerably affect the bearing capacity.
