= Federal Government Academy, Suleja =

The Federal Government Academy, formerly known as Suleja Academy, it was founded in 1986 by the Federal Government under the Babangida regime, is a Nigerian secondary school in Suleja. It was established for the education of Nigerian gifted and talented children in fully funded four, then later, six year programs.

In 1982, the Nigerian Federal Government set up a committee to brainstorm on the education of "gifted children". Four years later in 1986, Jubril Aminu, then Minister of Education established the Gifted Education Programme which culminated in what came to be known as Suleja Academy. The objective of setting up the Gifted programme as stated in the Blue Print is to ‘'provide opportunities for exceptionally Gifted children to develop at their own pace in the interest of the nation's economic and technological development.'’ The academy further serves as a center of academic and moral excellence in identifying and nurturing gifted Nigerian children of secondary school age, provide a broad based education that enables the individual to develop his/her cognitive and creative skills and also build strong leadership traits that can impact on society. Facilitate and support the education and skill development of these intellectually high class children in order to harness their full potential for self reliance and socio-economic development of the country.

The selection process for the pioneer students of the academy was carried out over 2 years. The very first students selected were taken from their secondary schools in their first year and placed in 'Gifted centres' in a number of Federal Government secondary schools throughout the country. Their curriculum was very rigorous as they were to complete the three years of junior secondary school in just two years - and attain a minimum standard in the JS 3 exams to continue with the program. The JS 1 students were chosen while in their final year of primary school - mainly those that had the highest Primary 6 exams or Common Entrance scores. Exams were conducted in each of the Nigerian states for these pupils, those that passed had to sit another exam and less than 70 students were picked from the entire country.

The Federal Government Academy Suleja, formerly known as Suleja Academy, began on 25 May 1990, during the tenure of Professor Jubril Aminu as the Minister of Education. The first students were in three "sets" - Junior Secondary (JS) 1, Junior Secondary (JS) 2 and Senior Secondary (SS) 1, totalling 180, as the "pioneers" of Suleja Academy. In May 1990, the living conditions were nothing like they were supposed to be; the school had taken over the site of a technical college and the ousted students had vandalised a lot of property before leaving. It would be six months before the students had any electricity and even longer before they had running water.

The academy is a co-educational institution owned by the Federal Government of Nigeria, with the motto "Creativity and Excellence". It operates as a boarding school, enrolling students from across the country who receive full scholarships from the federal government. The institution was established to provide education for gifted and talented students. At its establishment, the academy had a principal, a vice-principal, 15 academic staff members and 205 students, comprising 151 boys and 54 girls. It was established on the premises of the former Federal School of Arts and Sciences, which continued to serve as its campus. During its first 20 years, the academy graduated more than 1,750 students. Its graduates have pursued higher education at institutions in Nigeria and abroad and entered various professional fields.

Many principals, vice principals and teachers have passed through the academy. Below is a list of principals who have served in the school, beginning with the present.

- Mrs O.O Awofisayo September 2012 - 2015
- Mr E.K Kalu May 2012 – September 2012 (Acting Principal).
- Mr O.O Oguntoyinbo October 2010 – May 2012.
- Mrs C.M Obi-Okonkwo December 2005 –2010.
- Mr J.Y Oladele Oct 2004 – 2005.
- Mr A.H.U Ejembi July 2003 –Dec 2005.
- late Mr H.A Suaibu (Acting) Feb. 2002 – July 2003.
- Mr S.O Olaoye December 2000 – February 2002.
- Alhaji I.K Zaifada January 1996 – November 2000.
- late Mr F.I Gaadi – February 1995 – December 2000.
- late M.r S.I Balogun – May 1991 – January 1995.
- late Mr D. O Taiwo – May 1990 – May 1991.

Federal Government Academy, (FEDACAD) has produced many notable alumni.

The school takes part in Cowbell Mathematics competition, junior and senior category, and regularly wins trophies and prizes.

== Notable alumni ==
- Bunmi Banjo, business leader and marketing and strategy professional
- Kunle Adeyemi, architect and innovator
- Obialo Onukogu, medical professional
