= Kunlé Adeyemi =

Nigerian architect, urbanist and creative researcher

- Born: Adekunle Adeyemi; April 7, 1976 (age 49); Kaduna, Nigeria
- Education: University of Lagos (B.Arch); Princeton University (Post-Professional Degree)
- Occupations: Architect, Urbanist, Creative Researcher
- Years active: 2002–present
- Organization: NLÉ
- Known for: Makoko Floating School, Sustainable Architecture, Urbanism
- Website: nleworks.com

Kunlé Adeyemi was born on the 7 April 1976 and is a Nigerian architect, urbanist and creative researcher. Adeyemi is founder and principal of NLÉ, an architecture, design and urbanism practice, based in Amsterdam, in the Netherlands. Adeyemi studied at the University of Lagos in Nigeria and Princeton University in New Jersey, the United States. Before starting his office in the Netherlands, he worked nearly a decade at Office for Metropolitan Architecture (OMA).

== Early life ==
Adekunle Adeyemi was born and raised in Kaduna, in northern Nigeria, and studied and started his early career in Lagos. His father was a modernist architect and started one of the first indigenous architecture firms in North Nigeria in the 1970s. In his mid-teens, Adeyemi had the opportunity to design his first house, for a friend of his father.

Adeyemi is an alumnus of Federal Government Academy, Suleja, Nigeria's school for the education of gifted children, where he was a member of the inaugural class that graduated in 1992. He studied architecture at the University of Lagos in Nigeria, and finished his Bachelor as Best Graduate. In 2005, Adeyemi received a Post-Professional degree at Princeton University School of Architecture in New Jersey. At that university, Adeyemi investigated with Peter Eisenman, the rapid urbanization and the role of market economies in developing cities of the Global South, focusing on Lagos.

== Early career ==
In his early career, Adeyemi worked on projects in Lagos, Abuja and other parts of Nigeria. After that, Adeyemi joined OMA (The Office for Metropolitan Architecture) in 2002, where he was Senior Associate and worked for about nine years alongside its award-winning founder Rem Koolhaas. There, Adeyemi led the following projects, in different stages:

- Qatar Foundation Headquarters, the Central Library and the Strategic Studies Center, in the Education City in Doha
- The 4th Mainland Bridge and Master Plan in Lagos
- The Prada Transformer project in 2009
- New Court Rothschild Bank project in London (2006). This bank is about to open soon
- Master plan concept for Abuja – AIST, Nigeria in 2006 for the Nelson Mandela African Institute of Science and Technology
- Shenzhen Stock Exchange in 2006, opened in November 2007
- The Seoul National University Museum project in 2005
- The S-project Masterplan for Seoul in 2004
- The Leeum Museum in Seoul in 2004.

== Current work and projects ==
Currently, Adeyemi runs his architecture, design and urbanism practice called NLÉ, located in Amsterdam. NLÉ means 'at home' in Yoruba. With his office NLÉ, Adeyemi is interested in elements that make up a city. He focuses especially on the rapidly growing cities in developing countries. Adeyemi seeks the logic in systems that arise in the rapid development of those cities. He observes and questions the existing systems within these cities and creates new solutions inspired by his 'reading' of those systems. Adeyemi is convinced that there is much to learn from the condition found in rapidly developing, energetic cities, like one of Africa's most populated cities Lagos in Nigeria. NLÉ offers a strategy advisory service focusing on city development research, conceptualisation, creative structuring, architectural-, product- and infrastructure design, arts and urban cultural intervention. In much of his recent work, Adeyemi is particularly interested in urbanization, climate change, and policy. Among others, Adeyemi conducted with NLÉ the following activities:

- Building prototype housing for urban tropic environment.
- ‘Queensday Lagos', to exchange the Dutch Queensday experience with inhabitants of Lagos by video conferencing
- Lagos Photo project with the African Artists' Foundation.
- Makoko Floating School (collapsed June 2016).
- MFS II and MFS III: the 2nd and 3rd iterations of his Makoko Floating School Project

== Academic contribution ==
Adeyemi gave and gives lectures and workshops at universities and conferences in Amsterdam, Zurich, Delft, Guggenheim, and published several articles on architecture and urbanism:

- Adeyemi is 2011 Callison Distinguished Visiting Lecturer of the University of Washington, faculty of Architecture, teaching and researching 'The Modern City in the Age of Globalization' in Chandigarh, together with Dr. Vikramaditya Prakash, following-up Glenn Murcutt.
- At PICNIC 2011 (yearly creative conference), Adeyemi spoke about organic urban growth versus city planning
- Adeyemi was visiting critic at the Harvard Graduate School of Design in America, the Architectural Association in London, and the Berlage Institute in Rotterdam
- Adeyemi published the article "Urban Crawl" in the LOG Journal, summer/fall 2007, about contemporary cities and the future of architecture.
- In 2006, Adeyemi was keynote speaker at the Guggenheim Symposium "Contamination, Impure Architecture", next to Zaha Hadid, Sanford Kwinter, and Alex McDowell
- Adeyemi was in 2006 a teacher at the Urban Body Studio of the Delft University of Technology, Faculty of Architecture.
- Adeyemi joined Architecture for Humanity as competition juror and project reviewer.

== See also ==
- List of Nigerian architects
