= Rimini Makama =

Nigerian lawyer and business executive

- Citizenship: Nigeria
- Education: University of Jos (Bachelor of Laws); London School of Marketing (Diploma in Marketing); University of Reading (Master of Laws)
- Occupations: Lawyer, Entrepreneur, Corporate Executive
- Years active: 2007–present

Rimini Haraya Makama is a lawyer, entrepreneur and a corporate executive. She is the Executive Commissioner of Stakeholder Management at the Nigerian Communications Commission. Makama was confirmed to her position by the Nigerian Senate on 21 May 2024 following her nomination by President Bola Ahmed Tinubu GCFR on 23 February 2024.

== Early life and education ==
Makama was born in Jos, Plateau State, in the north-central part of Nigeria. Makama studied law at the University of Jos Nigeria, graduating with an LLB. After attending Law School, she was called to the Nigerian Bar. Makama went on to obtain an LLM from the University of Reading. Makama also holds a CIM Diploma from the London School of Marketing.

== Career ==
In February 2024, she was appointed as the Executive Commissioner of Stakeholder Management at the Nigerian Communications Commission. Her appointment was confirmed by the Nigerian Senate on the 21st of May 2024.

Before assuming her current role in the Nigerian Communications Commission, Makama played various roles at Microsoft from 2016 to 2023, notably as the Government Affairs Director for MEA Emerging Markets. In this capacity, she was instrumental in creating a policy landscape that facilitated the adoption of public cloud technology by the public sector in various markets across MEA.

During her tenure at Microsoft, Makama represented the company's interests on the Digital Economy Task Force of the US Chamber of Commerce and the SMART Africa Alliance. She also became known for disseminating key messages on AI ethics, notably appearing as an AI policy expert speaker at the UNESCO Forum on Artificial Intelligence in 2018.

Makama's career also includes a significant tenure with Africa Practice as Communications Director for West Africa. In this role, she successfully translated the strategic communication needs of major corporations such as Uber, PayPal, CNN, Google SSA, Bloomberg LP, Sage VIP, Actis West Africa, and The African Union into effective solutions, collaborating closely with high-level government stakeholders.

Prior to her role at Africa Practice she was Principal Legal Assistant, Office of Legal Affairs - International Criminal Police Organization (INTERPOL) in Lyon, France.

=== Creative pursuits ===
Makama is a film enthusiast. She was the Executive Producer of Green White Green, a coming of age indie film which tells the story of three Nigerian teenagers as they make the transition from secondary school to university. She was the Executive Producer The Lost Okoroshi, a Nigerian indie film which TheGATE.ca described as "a shining example of some of the most exciting cinema coming out of Africa today".

== See also ==
- Ada Osakwe
- Amy Jadesimi
- Nigerian Communications Commission
