= Floating Farm =

Floating building in Rotterdam, the Netherlands

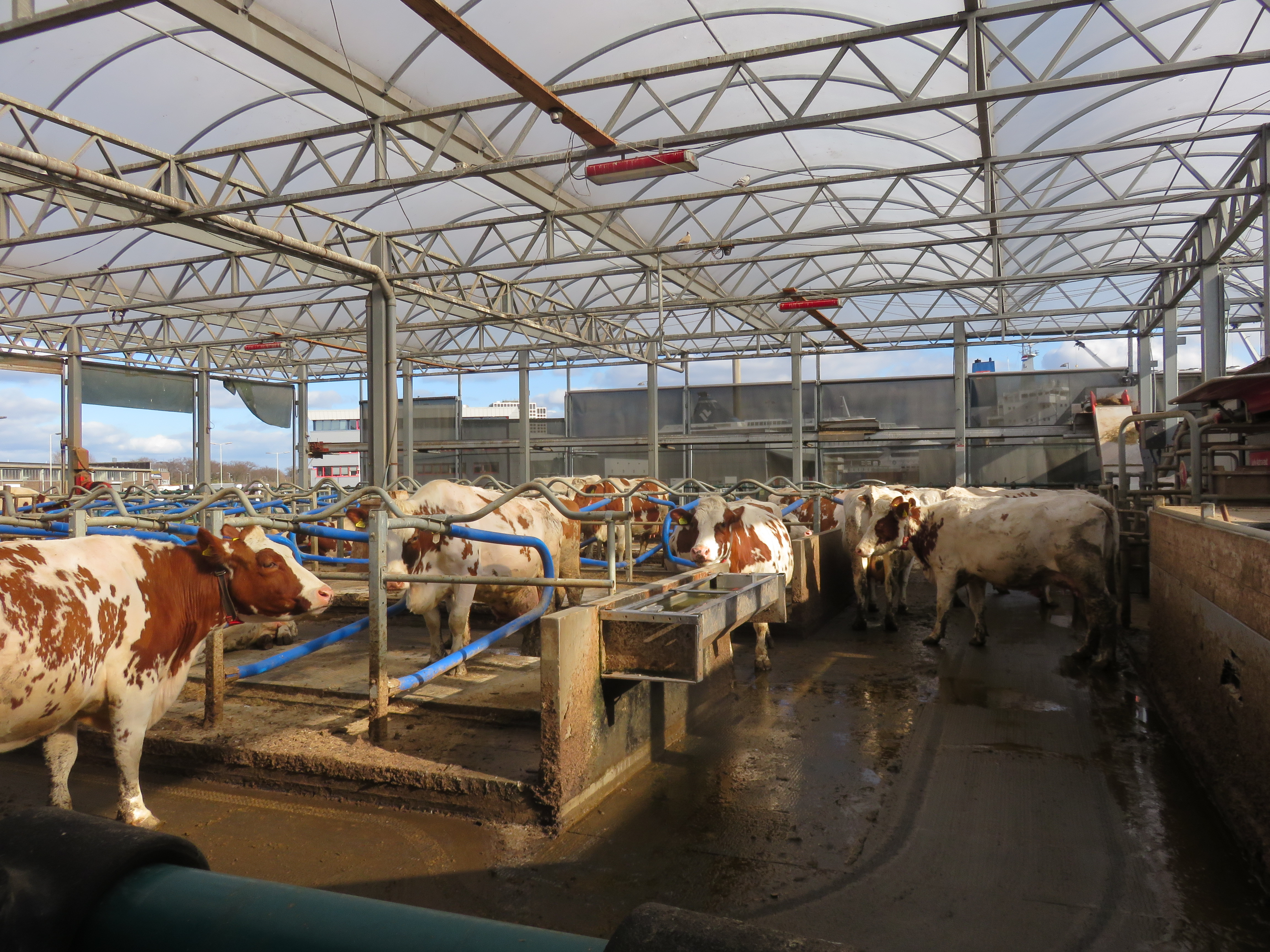
Floating Farm interior

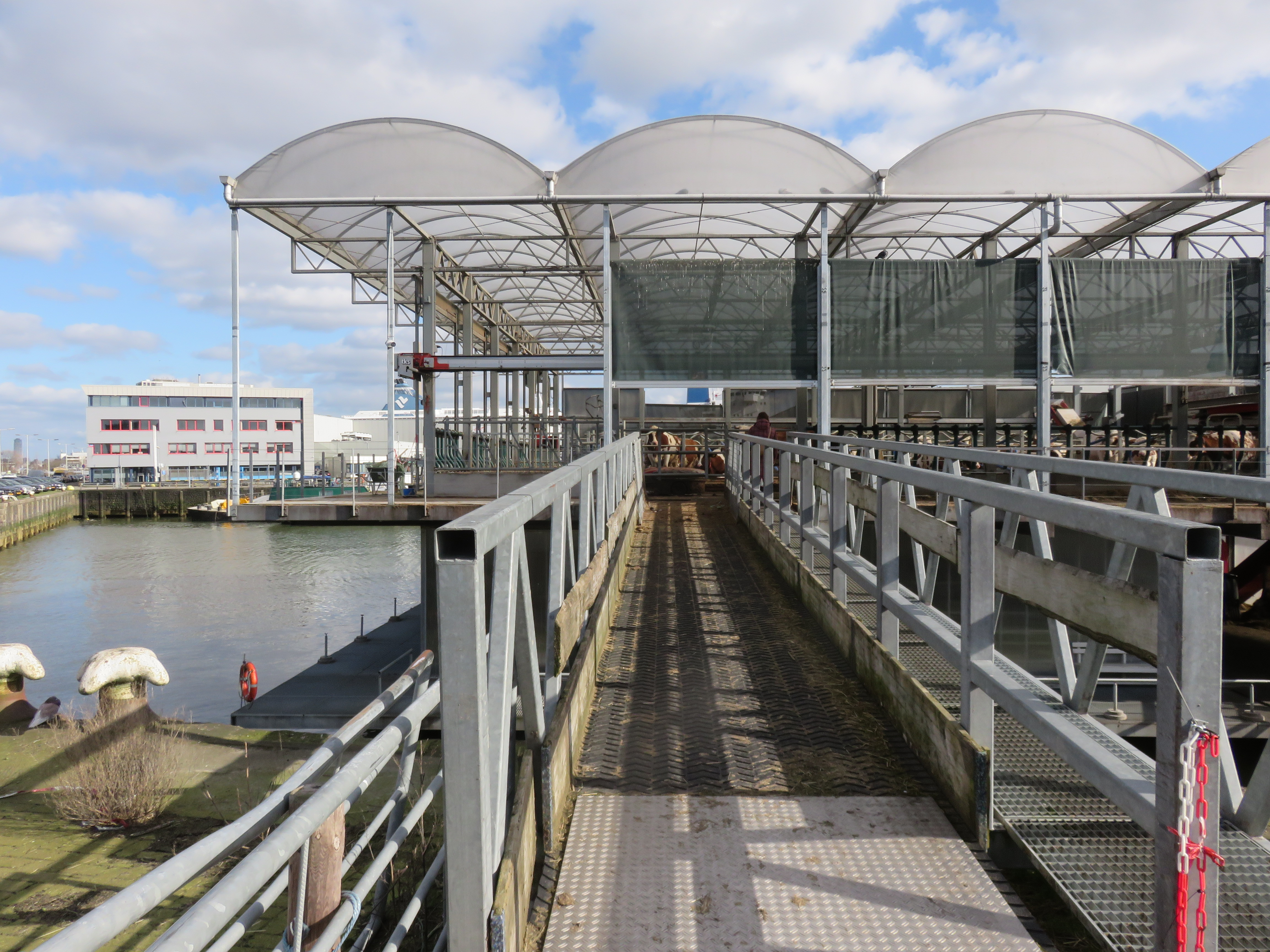
Floating Farm from shore to raft

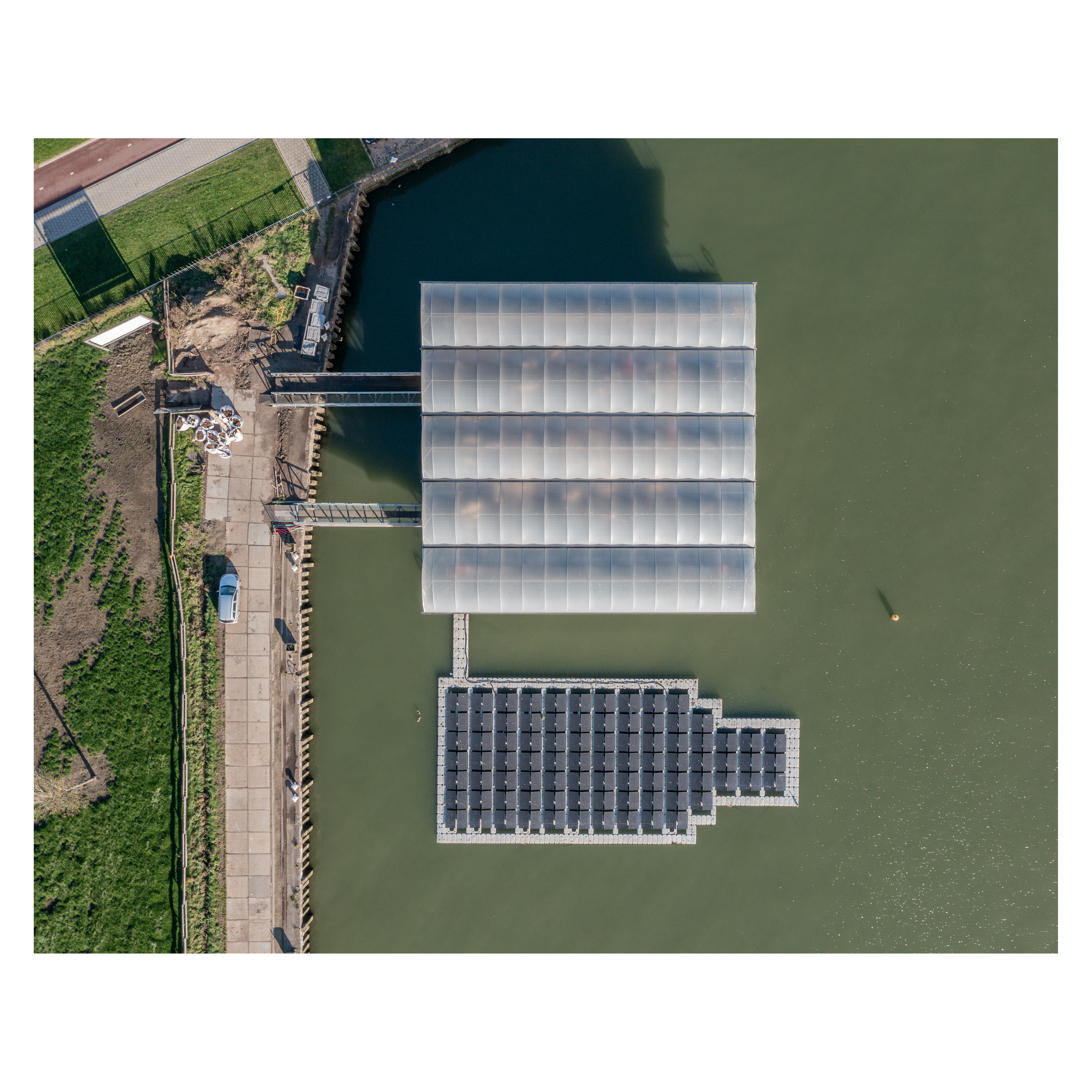
Floating Farm at Meuse River, Rotterdam

Floating Farm is a floating dairy farm, described by its founders as the world's first, located in the harbour of Rotterdam. The farm produces fresh dairy products from 40 cows who live on the facility. All raw dairy is processed onsite into fresh milk and yoghurt and distributed inside the city.

Founded by Peter and Minke van Wingerden, the Floating Farm opened on May 13, 2019 with 32 cows, with the plan to grow to 40 cows in the future.

== Circularity ==
To support growing cities, Floating Farm is designed to use residual products, such as grass from public parks and food waste, produced by the city, to feed the animals and give fresh milk back to the city. This will not only give actual use to residual products but also cut food transportation cost and pollution by keeping production and use of food closely together. The manure from the cows will also provide the city with fertilizer for public spaces.

The structure includes a pasture area, resting area, feeding station, milk and manure processing facilities, and a store for visitors. All of its power is sourced from solar energy panels, and rainwater is collected on the structure's roof. The farm also utilizes many automated processes, such as automated milking, manure cleanup, and feeding.
