= Makoko Floating School =

Building project in Lagos, Nigeria (2013–2016)

- Makoko, Lagos; Nigeria

Information
- Established: 2013
- Closed: 2016

The Makoko Floating School was a building project of Makoko, Lagos, Nigeria which was developed in 2013. The school was abandoned in March 2016 over safety concerns and collapsed in a storm in June 2016. Subsequent iterations have been proposed.

== History ==
Prior to the commencement of the project, the children of Makoko only had access to one primary school which was inadequate, built on reclaimed land, and frequently threatened by recurrent flooding. In 2013, a Nigerian architect, Kunlé Adeyemi of NLÉ proposed to transform the water slum status of the Makoko waterfront community to a floating island by creating a functional building prototype. This prototype would have the ability to combat previous issues with flooding on land by having the school float alongside the community. He collaborated with Non-Governmental Organisations including Heinrich Böll Foundation, United Nations Development Programme (UNDP), Federal Ministry of Environment Africa Adaptation Programme, Yaba Local Council Development Area (LCDA) and Makoko waterfront community to execute the project.

== Design ==
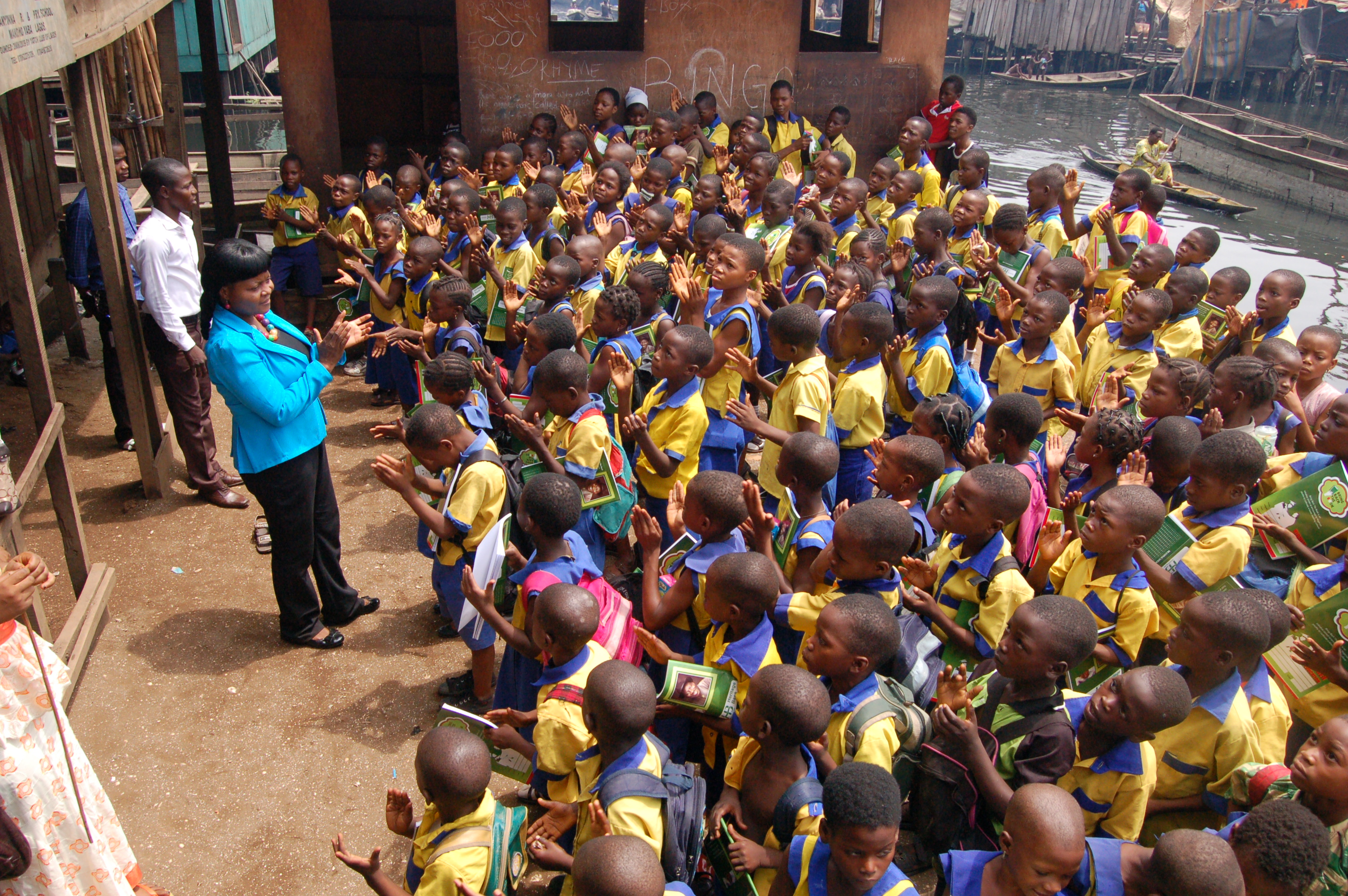
Makoko Floating school

The Makoko floating school comprised alternative sustainable buildings and structures designed to adapt to the resident communities' aquatic lifestyle. The floating school utilized local materials such as bamboo, timber and resources to produce architecture that applied to the physical, social needs of people and reflects the culture of the community. Wood was the major material for the structure, support and finishing of school building.

The form of the school building was a triangular A-Frame section with about 1,000-square-foot play area. The classrooms are located on the second tier and are partially enclosed with adjustable louvered slats. The classrooms are also surrounded by spatial public greenery. There is a playground below the classroom while the roof contains an additional open air classroom. The classroom spaces can be used for communal functions especially during out-of-school hours. Sustainable features include application of solar cells to the roof, rainwater catchment systems and composting toilets. The structure is also designed to use about 250 plastic barrels to float on the waters and be naturally ventilated and aerated. There are considerations to use the building prototype to provide additional infrastructure for the community including an entertainment center, a community hub and health clinics. The floating school design won the 2013 AR+D award for emerging architecture and was shortlisted for the London Design Museum's 2014 Design of the Year award. It also received a nomination for the 2015 International Award for Public Art.

On June 7, 2016, the Makoko Floating school structure was adversely affected by heavy rain, and collapsed. No casualties were recorded as the students and teachers had relocated three months earlier due to safety concerns. An improvement on the building prototype will be used as replacement.

== MFS II and MFS III ==
In 2016, a second iteration of the Makoko Floating School, called the Makoko Floating School II (MFS II), was unveiled at the Venice Architectural Biennale. This updated version was designed to be a prefabricated, rapid-assembly version of the original. It was awarded the Silver Lion prize, recognized as a “powerful demonstration, be it in Lagos in Venice, that architecture, at once iconic and pragmatic, can amplify the importance of education”.

A third iteration of the Makoko Floating School, MFS III, was displayed in 2018. Located in Bruges, Belgium, MFS III aims to redesign the floating school to be more structurally sound, claiming a 25-year life span.
