= LSM Education =

Private business school

London School of Design and Marketing (formerly known as London School of Marketing) is a private business school based in London, United Kingdom. It offers professional and academic qualifications, including level-5 and level-7 diplomas and short courses. LSM Educations's head office is in Victoria, Central London. The school also has offices in Dubai, China, Sri Lanka and a network of Local Access Points (LAPs) from around the world.

== History ==
LSM Education was founded as London School of Marketing in 2002, by Paul Penman, Director. It began by providing programmes through The Chartered Institute of Marketing (CIM). It now also offers undergraduate and postgraduate diplomas validated by partner higher education institutions and awarding bodies, such as Qualifi and EduQual.

== Organisation and administration ==
=== Offices and locations ===
The main LSM Education building is at 9 Devonshire Square, Central London with further offices in China, Colombo, Sri Lanka and has its LAPs across various countries like West Africa, India, etc.

=== Ownership ===
LSM Education is a private company limited by guarantee and part of the LS Education Group.

== Academics ==
=== Accreditations ===
LSM Education is a BAC accredited online, distance and blended learning provider.

=== Programmes ===
The following courses are currently on offer:

==== Pathway programmes ====
Qualifi Diplomas

- Diploma in Business Management
- Diploma in Business Enterprise
- Diploma in Executive Management
- Diploma in Strategic Management and Leadership
- Diploma in Accounting and Finance
- Diploma in Human Resource Management

EduQual Diplomas

- Diploma in Business and Marketing Management
- Diploma in Business Management
- Diploma in Accounting and Finance
- Diploma in Business and Marketing Strategy
- Diploma in Human Resource Management
