= 2023 Nigerian Senate election =

Elections in Nigeria

- 25 February 2023 (Note: Due to disruptions—mainly violence or technical issues—on Election Day, INEC either postponed or extended voting to 26 or 27 February in certain affected areas. Additionally, the election for Enugu East was postponed to 11 March due to the death of LP nominee Oyibo Chukwu.)

All 109 seats in the Senate of Nigeria 55 seats needed for a majority
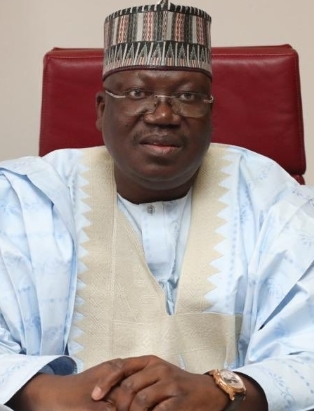
	Majority party	Minority party	Third party
		PDP
Leader	Ahmad Lawan	Philips Tanimu Aduda
Party	APC	PDP	LP
Leader's seat	Yobe North	Federal Capital Territory (lost seat)
Last election	63	44	0
Seats before	59	40	1
Seats after	59	37	7
Seat change	0	-3	+6
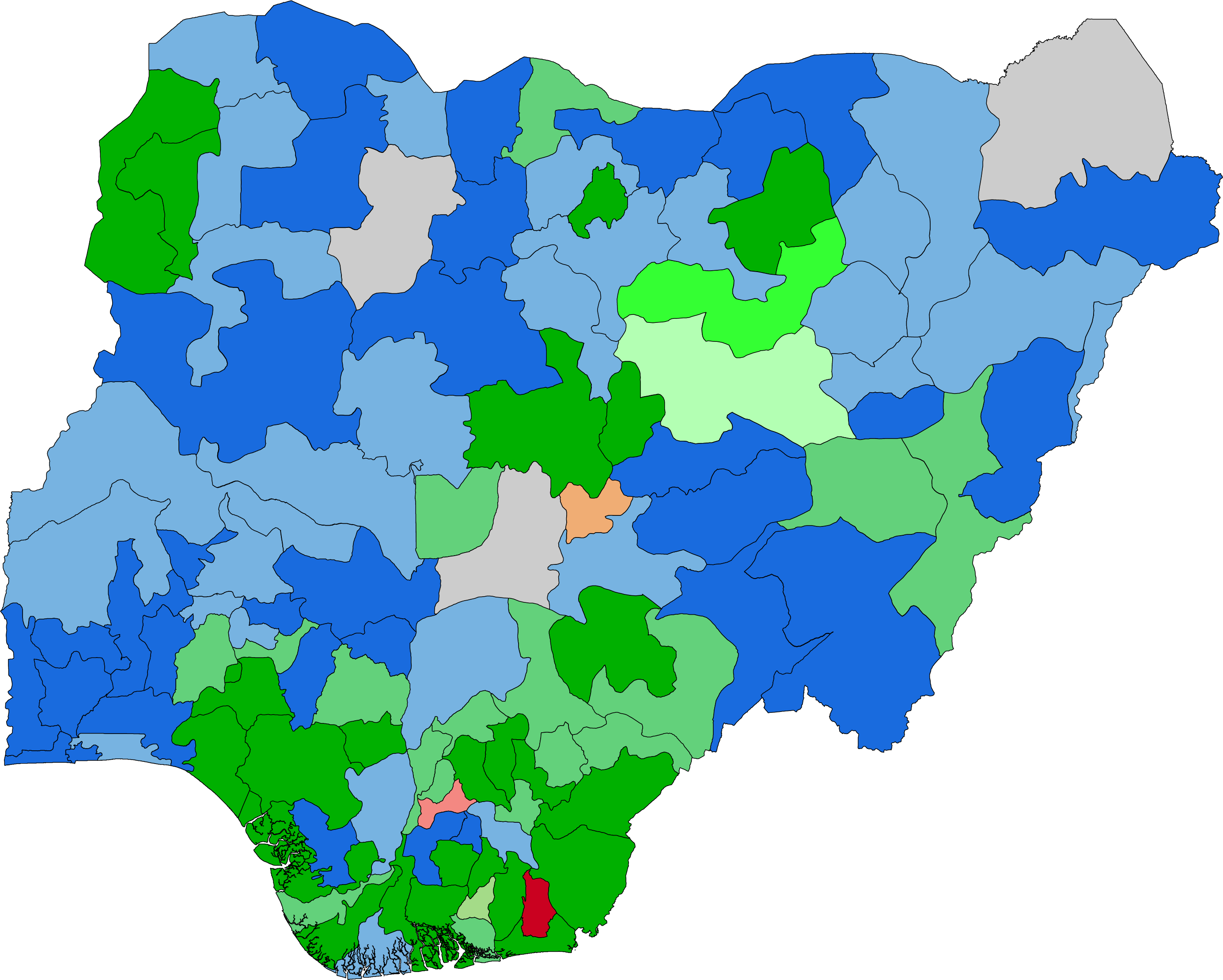
- Legend: APC incumbent retiring or lost renomination; APC incumbent running; APGA incumbent running; LP incumbent running; NNPP incumbent retiring or lost renomination; NNPP incumbent running; PDP incumbent retiring, lost renomination, or status yet to be determined; PDP incumbent running; SDP incumbent running; YPP incumbent retiring; YPP incumbent running; Vacant
Senate President before election
Ahmad Lawan
APC
Elected Senate President
Godswill Akpabio
APC

The 2023 Nigerian Senate elections were held on 25 February 2023 in all 109 senatorial districts where voters elected senators using first-past-the-post voting. The last regular senatorial elections for all districts were in 2019.

Other federal elections, including the elections to the House of Representatives and the presidential election, were also held on the same date while state elections was held two weeks afterwards on 11 March. The winners of these Senate elections will serve beginning in the 10th Nigerian National Assembly. The APC have held a majority in the Senate since the 2015 elections and solidified that majority in 2019.

As of May 2023, the APC had retained its 59 seats, while the PDP had lost 3 for a total of 37. The Labour Party won seats in its own name for the first time, taking 7 mandates, while smaller parties, such as the NNPP and Social Democratic Party, took a total of 5. One seat has not yet been called.

== Background ==
After the 2015–2019 Senate term led by President of the Senate Bukola Saraki (Peoples Democratic Party) and with a slight All Progressives Congress majority, the 2019 elections were categorized by a large shift back towards the APC and the defeats of multiple high-profile senators—including Saraki. As in the House of Representatives, the APC solidified its majority after nearly losing it due to defections in 2018.

At the opening of the 9th Nigeria National Assembly, Ahmad Lawan (APC-Yobe North) was elected as Senate President and Ovie Omo-Agege (APC-Delta Central) became Deputy Senate President as the party avoided the internal struggles that led Saraki and Ike Ekweremadu to take those offices in 2015. Enyinnaya Abaribe (PDP-Abia South) became the Senate Minority Leader. During the first two years of the 2019–2023 term, the APC expanded its majority through the defections of six formerly PDP senators (Note: Ishaku Elisha Abbo (Adamawa North); Peter Nwaoboshi (Delta North); Hassan Muhammed Gusau (Zamfara Central); Sahabi Alhaji Yaú (Zamfara North); Lawali Hassan Anka (Zamfara West); Stella Oduah (Anambra North)) but in the second half of the term, both parties were hit by several defections (Note: APC to NNPP; Ibrahim Shekarau (Kano Central); APC to PDP; Ahmad Babba Kaita (Katsina North); Stella Oduah (Anambra North); PDP to APC; Emmanuel Bwacha (Taraba South); Ibrahim Abdullahi Danbaba (Sokoto South); Mohammed Kola Balogun (Oyo South)) as party primaries for 2023 neared along with three APC resignations. (Note: Hassan Muhammed Gusau (Zamfara Central); Abubakar Kyari (Borno North); Abdullahi Adamu (Nasarawa West)) More defections occurred in the wake of party primaries as senators decamped to new parties (mainly in order to run for re-election), (Note: APC to NNPP; Halliru Dauda Jika (Bauchi Central); Lawal Yahaya Gumau (Bauchi South); APC to PDP; Adamu Muhammad Bulkachuwa (Bauchi North); APC to SDP; Godiya Akwashiki (Nasarawa North); NNPP to PDP; Ibrahim Shekarau (Kano Central); PDP to APC; Francis Alimikhena (Edo North); Adamu Aliero (Kebbi Central); Yahaya Abubakar Abdullahi (Kebbi North); PDP to APGA; Enyinnaya Abaribe (Abia South); PDP to LP; Onyewuchi Francis Ezenwa (Imo East); PDP to YPP; Bassey Albert Akpan (Akwa Ibom North-East)) most notably Abaribe who resigned as Minority Leader and joined APGA to run for re-election after withdrawing from the Abia PDP gubernatorial primary.

From the perspective of the APC, analysts viewed the 9th Senate as a change from the legislature versus executive disputes that were commonplace during the 8th Senate but critics derided the chamber as a rubber stamp that lacked the initiative to advocate for itself against the executive branch. In terms of specific major bills, the Senate was noted for passing the Sexual Harassment Bill in July 2020, the Finance Bill 2020 in December 2020, the Petroleum Industry Bill in July 2021, a new Electoral Act in January 2022, dozens of constitutional amendments and the Proceeds of Crime Bill in March 2022, and an Electoral Act amendment in May 2022 as well as being commended for rejecting former Buhari aide Lauretta Onochie's nomination to INEC. On the other hand, it was criticized for voting down constitutional amendments for mandating women slots in legislatures and diaspora voting along with the continuous stalling of a key gender equality bill and rampant misappropriation of public funds. The senate was also accused of dereliction of oversight duty after several ministerial nominees were either barely questioned or asked to "take a bow" and go without questioning at confirmation hearings.

== Retirements ==
In total, 31 senators; including 17 APC senators, one NNPP senator, 12 PDP senators, and one YPP senator—decided to retire, 22 of whom are seeking another office.

1. Abia Central: Theodore Orji (PDP) retired.
2. Adamawa Central: Aishatu Dahiru Ahmed (APC) retired to run for governor of Adamawa State.
3. Akwa Ibom North-East: Bassey Albert Akpan (YPP) retired to run for governor of Akwa Ibom State.
4. Akwa Ibom North-West: Chris Ekpenyong (PDP) retired.
5. Akwa Ibom South: Akon Eyakenyi (PDP) retired.
6. Bauchi Central: Halliru Dauda Jika (NNPP) retired to run for governor of Bauchi State.
7. Benue North-West: Emmanuel Yisa Orker-Jev (PDP) retired.
8. Cross River Central: Sandy Ojang Onor (PDP) retired to run for governor of Cross River State.
9. Cross River South: Gershom Bassey (PDP) retired to unsuccessfully run for governor of Cross River State.
10. Delta Central: Ovie Omo-Agege (APC) retired to run for governor of Delta State.
11. Delta South: James Manager (PDP) retired to unsuccessfully run for governor of Delta State.
12. Ebonyi Central: Joseph Ogba (PDP) retired to unsuccessfully run for governor of Ebonyi State.
13. Enugu North: Utazi Chukwuka (PDP) retired.
14. Enugu West: Ike Ekweremadu (PDP) retired to unsuccessfully run for governor of Enugu State.
15. Imo West: Rochas Okorocha (APC) retired to unsuccessfully run for president.
16. Jigawa North-East: Ibrahim Hassan Hadejia (APC) is retired unsuccessfully run for governor of Jigawa State.
17. Kaduna Central: Uba Sani (APC) retired to run for governor of Kaduna State.
18. Kogi Central: Yakubu Oseni (APC) retired.
19. Lagos Central: Oluremi Tinubu (APC) retired.
20. Lagos West: Solomon Olamilekan Adeola (APC) retired to run for senator for Ogun West.
21. Ogun Central: Ibikunle Amosun (APC) retired to unsuccessfully run for president.
22. Ondo North: Robert Ajayi Boroffice (APC) retired to unsuccessfully run for president.
23. Oyo Central: Teslim Folarin (APC) retired to run for governor of Oyo State.
24. Plateau Central: Hezekiah Ayuba Dimka (APC) retired to unsuccessfully run for governor of Plateau State.
25. Rivers East: Betty Apiafi (PDP) retired.
26. Rivers East: George Thompson Sekibo (PDP) retired to unsuccessfully run for governor of Rivers State.
27. Sokoto East: Abdullahi Ibrahim Gobir (APC) retired to unsuccessfully run for governor of Sokoto State.
28. Taraba Central: Yusuf Abubakar Yusuf (APC) retired to unsuccessfully run for governor of Taraba State.
29. Taraba South: Emmanuel Bwacha (APC) retired to run for governor of Taraba State.
30. Yobe North: Ahmad Lawan (APC) is retired to unsuccessfully run for president. (Note: Although Lawan initially opted to run for President instead of seeking re-election, he attempted to gain the senatorial nomination after losing the APC presidential primary. His attempt, using a sudden rerun primary that nominated him, was deemed illegal in a Federal High Court ruling as the original nominee—Bashir Sheriff Machina—had not withdrawn from the nomination. The ruling was then upheld by a Court of Appeal judgment in late November 2022.)
1. Zamfara West: Lawali Hassan Anka (APC) retired.

== Resignations ==
Three seats will be vacant on the day of the election due to resignations, none of which will be filled until the next Senate.

1. Borno North: Abubakar Kyari (APC) resigned on 12 April 2022 to become APC Deputy National Chairman (North).
2. Nasarawa West: Abdullahi Adamu (APC) resigned on 12 April 2022 to become APC National Chairman.
3. Zamfara Central: Hassan Nasiha (APC) resigned on 23 February 2022 to become Deputy Governor of Zamfara State.

== Incumbents withdrew ==
=== From primary elections ===
Six incumbents withdrew from primary elections. However, three of the senators later decamped from their original party and won the nomination of their new party.

1. Edo North: Francis Alimikhena (then-APC) withdrew from the primary election. However, Alimikhena defected to the PDP and became its (disputed) senatorial nominee.
2. Jigawa North-West: Danladi Abdullahi Sankara (APC) withdrew from the primary election.
3. Kebbi Central: Adamu Aliero (then-APC) withdrew from the primary election. However, Aliero defected to the PDP and became its (disputed) senatorial nominee.
4. Nasarawa North: Godiya Akwashiki (then-APC) withdrew from the primary election. However, Akwashiki defected to the SDP and became its senatorial nominee.
5. Ogun East: Ramoni Olalekan Mustapha (APC) withdrew from the primary election.
6. Plateau South: Nora Daduut withdrew from the primary election.

=== From nomination ===
One incumbent withdrew from their nomination.

1. Borno Central: Kashim Shettima (APC) won renomination but withdrew from the nomination to become the APC nominee for vice president.

== Incumbents defeated ==
=== In primary elections ===
20 incumbents (12 APC senators and 8 PDP senators) lost in primary elections. After the primary elections, three of the senators (2 APC senators and 1 PDP senator) defected to new parties with two of the senators (one each in the APC and PDP) then winning the nomination of the new party.

1. Bauchi North: Adamu Muhammad Bulkachuwa (APC) lost renomination to Siraj Ibrahim Tanko Muhammad. Bulkachuwa later defected to the PDP.
2. ~~Bauchi South: Lawal Yahaya Gumau (then-APC) lost renomination to Shehu Buba Umar. However, Gumau later defected to the NNPP and became its senatorial nominee.~~
3. Bayelsa Central: Moses Cleopas (PDP) lost renomination to Konbowei Benson.
4. Edo South: Matthew Urhoghide (PDP) lost renomination to Matthew Iduoriyekemwen.
5. Ekiti North: Olubunmi Ayodeji Adetunmbi (APC) lost renomination to Cyril Fasuyi.
6. Gombe South: Amos Bulus Kilawangs (APC) lost renomination to Joshua M. Lidani.
7. ~~Imo East: Ezenwa Francis Onyewuchi (then-PDP) lost renomination to Uche Onyegucha. However, Onyewuchi later defected to the LP and became its senatorial nominee.~~
8. Imo North: Chukwuma Frank Ibezim (APC) lost renomination to Patrick Ndubueze.
9. Kaduna South: Danjuma Laah (PDP) lost renomination to Sunday Marshall Katunɡ.
10. Katsina Central: Kabir Abdullahi Barkiya (APC) lost renomination to Abdul'aziz Musa Yar'adua.
11. Katsina South: Bello Mandiya (APC) lost renomination to Mohammed Muntari Dandutse.
12. Kogi West: Smart Adeyemi (APC) lost renomination to Sunday Karimi.
13. Kwara Central: Ibrahim Yahaya Oloriegbe (APC) lost renomination to Saliu Mustapha.
14. Niger North: Aliyu Sabi Abdullahi (APC) lost renomination to Abubakar Sani Bello.
15. Ogun West: Tolu Odebiyi (APC) lost renomination to Solomon Olamilekan Adeola.
16. Ondo Central: Patrick Ayo Akinyelure (PDP) lost renomination to Ifedayo Adedipe.
17. Ondo South: Nicholas Tofowomo (PDP) lost renomination to Agboola Ajayi.
18. Osun West: Adelere Adeyemi Oriolowo (APC) lost renomination to Raheem Amidu Tadese.
19. Oyo South: Mohammed Kola Balogun (APC) lost nomination to Sharafadeen Alli.
20. Plateau North: Istifanus Gyang (PDP) lost renomination to Simon Mwadkwon.

=== In general elections ===
Twenty-one incumbents (10 APC senators, one NNPP senator, and 10 PDP senators) lost in general elections.

1. Anambra Central: Uche Ekwunife (PDP) lost re-election to Victor Umeh (LP).
2. Anambra North: Stella Oduah (PDP) lost re-election to Tony Nwoye (LP).
3. Bauchi South: Lawal Yahaya Gumau (NNPP) lost re-election to Shehu Buba Umar (APC).
4. Bayelsa East: Biobarakuma Degi (APC) lost re-election to Benson Agadaga (PDP).
5. Benue North-East: Gabriel Suswam (PDP) lost re-election to Emmanuel Memga Udende (APC).
6. Delta North: Peter Nwaoboshi (APC) lost re-election to Ned Nwoko (PDP).
7. Ebonyi North: Sam Egwu (PDP) lost re-election to Onyekachi Nwaebonyi (APC).
8. Ebonyi South: Michael Ama Nnachi (PDP) lost re-election to Dave Umahi (APC).
9. Edo Central: Clifford Ordia (PDP) lost re-election to Monday Okpebholo (APC).
10. Edo North: Francis Alimikhena (PDP) lost re-election to Adams Oshiomhole (APC).
11. Ekiti South: Abiodun Olujimi (PDP) lost re-election to Raphael Adeyemi Adaramodu (APC).
12. Federal Capital Territory: Philips Tanimu Aduda (PDP) lost re-election to Ireti Kingibe (LP).
13. Gombe North: Sa'idu Ahmed Alkali (APC) lost re-election to Ibrahim Hassan Dankwambo (PDP).
14. Jigawa South-West: Mohammed Sabo Nakudu (APC) lost re-election to Mustapha Khabeeb (PDP).
15. Kaduna North: Suleiman Abdu Kwari (APC) lost re-election to Khalid Mustapha (PDP).
16. Kano South: Kabiru Ibrahim Gaya (APC) lost re-election to Suleiman Abdurrahman Kawu Sumaila (NNPP).
17. Katsina North: Ahmad Babba Kaita (PDP) lost re-election to Nasiru Sani Zangon Daura (APC).
18. Kebbi South: Bala Ibn Na'allah (APC) lost re-election to Garba Musa Maidoki (PDP).
19. Nasarawa South: Umaru Tanko Al-Makura (APC) lost re-election to Mohammed Ogoshi Onawo (PDP).
20. Niger South: Muhammad Bima Enagi (APC) lost re-election to Peter Ndalikali Jiya (PDP).
21. Osun Central: Ajibola Basiru (APC) lost re-election to Olubiyi Fadeyi (PDP).

== Results ==
=== National ===
Party	Votes	%	Seats	+/–
All Progressives Congress			59	–5
Peoples Democratic Party			37	–7
Labour Party			7	+7
New Nigeria People's Party			2	New
Social Democratic Party			2	+2
All Progressives Grand Alliance			1	+1
Young Progressives Party			1	0
Total			109	0
Registered voters/turnout	93,469,008	–		

=== Summary ===
Parties									Total
Parties	APC	PDP	YPP	NNPP	APGA	LP	SDP	Vacant	Total
Last election (2019)	63	44	1	0	0	0	0	1 (Note: The 2019 election in Akwa Ibom North-West was partially voided with its supplementary election called for a date in 2020 leaving the seat vacant in 2019.)	109
Before these elections	59	40	2	2	1	1	1	3	109

=== Principal officers' races ===
Office		Name	Party	District	Votes	%	Position	Result
Presiding officers	Senate President	Ahmad Lawan	APC	Yobe North	TBD (Note: Although Lawan initially opted to run for President instead of seeking re-election, he attempted to gain the senatorial nomination after losing the APC presidential primary. His attempt, using a sudden rerun primary that nominated him, was deemed illegal in a Federal High Court ruling as the original nominee—Bashir Sheriff Machina—had not withdrawn from the nomination. The ruling was then upheld by a Court of Appeal judgment in late November 2022. At the Supreme court, the judgements of the lower courts were over turned on the basis of improper procedure for the initial suit at the Federal High Court. The majority ruling held that an originating summons was inappropriate for the case, two judges were in dissent.)		1st	Re-elected
Presiding officers	Deputy Senate President	Ovie Omo-Agege	APC	Delta Central	Did not seek re-election			Not re-elected
Majority leadership	Majority Leader	Abdullahi Ibrahim Gobir	APC	Sokoto East	Did not seek re-election			Not re-elected
Majority leadership	Deputy Majority Leader	Robert Ajayi Boroffice	APC	Ondo North	Did not seek re-election			Not re-elected
Majority leadership	Majority Whip	Orji Uzor Kalu	APC	Abia North	TBD		1st	Re-elected
Majority leadership	Deputy Majority Whip	Aliyu Sabi Abdullahi	APC	Niger North	Lost renomination			Not re-elected
Minority leadership	Minority Leader	Philips Tanimu Aduda	PDP	FCT	TBD		2nd	Not re-elected
Minority leadership	Deputy Minority Leader	Shuaibu Isa Lau	PDP	Taraba North	TBD		1st	Re-elected
Minority leadership	Minority Whip	Utazi Chukwuka	PDP	Enugu North	Did not seek re-election			Not re-elected
Minority leadership	Deputy Minority Whip	Danjuma Laah	PDP	Kaduna South	Lost renomination			Not re-elected

== Timeline ==
- 23–24 February 2019 – The All Progressives Congress wins the 2019 Nigerian Senate election, the Peoples Democratic Party stayed as the main minority party, and the Young Progressives Party entered the Senate as a smaller minority party.
- 11 June 2019 – Most senators officially sworn into office. Ahmad Lawan (APC-Yobe North) and Ovie Omo-Agege (APC-Delta Central) elected as Senate President and Deputy Senate President, respectively.
- 2 July 2019 – Other principal officers were announced with Yahaya Abubakar Abdullahi (APC-Kebbi North) and Orji Uzor Kalu (APC-Abia North) becoming Majority Leader and Majority Whip, respectively. In the minority, Enyinnaya Abaribe (PDP-Abia South) became Senate Minority Leader while Philips Tanimu Aduda (PDP-Federal Capital Territory) was named Minority Whip.
- June 2019 to January 2020 – In the months after the election, litigation and supplemental elections led to the inauguration of several new senators, with some replacing previously sworn-in senators while others filled open seats.
- 21 June 2022 – Philips Tanimu Aduda (PDP-FCT) becomes Minority Leader after Abia South Senator Enyinnaya Abaribe resigned from the position before defecting to APGA. Utazi Chukwuka (PDP-Enugu North) replaces Aduda as Minority Whip.
- 11 May 2022 – Abdullahi Ibrahim Gobir (APC-Sokoto East) becomes Majority Leader after Kebbi North Senator Yahaya Abubakar Abdullahi resigned from the position before defecting to the PDP.

=== Changes ===
Changes in seats held (2019–2023)
Seat	Before				Change		
Seat	Date	Member	Party	Reason	Date	Member	Party
Imo West	11 June 2019	Vacant		Alleged forced election declaration	13 June 2019	Rochas Okorocha	APC
Imo North	11 June 2019	Vacant		Alleged election irregularities	26 July 2019	Benjamin Uwajumogu	APC
Niger East	14 June 2019	David Umaru	APC	Court awarded primary election win to opponent	2 July 2019	Sani Musa	APC
Kogi West	23 August 2019	Dino Melaye	PDP	Court annulled general election; opponent won re-run	4 December 2019	Smart Adeyemi	APC
Sokoto South	30 October 2019	Abubakar Shehu Tambuwal	APC	Court awarded general election win to opponent	19 November 2019	Ibrahim Abdullahi Danbaba	PDP
Ekiti South	6 November 2019	Adebayo Clement Adeyeye	APC	Court awarded general election win to opponent	14 November 2019	Abiodun Olujimi	PDP
Akwa Ibom North-West	9 November 2019	Chris Ekpenyong	PDP	Court partially annulled general election; sacked senator won supplementary election	30 January 2020	Chris Ekpenyong	PDP
Imo North	18 December 2019	Benjamin Uwajumogu	APC	Died	27 April 2021	Frank Ibezim	APC
Plateau South	10 February 2020	Ignatius Datong Longjan	APC	Died	15 December 2020	Nora Daduut	APC
Bayelsa Central	14 February 2020	Douye Diri	PDP	Member elected Bayelsa Governor	15 December 2020	Moses Cleopas	PDP
Bayelsa West	14 February 2020	Lawrence Ewhrudjakpo	PDP	Member elected Bayelsa Deputy Governor	15 December 2020	Henry Seriake Dickson	PDP
Cross River North	23 March 2020	Rose Okoji Oko	PDP	Died	16 December 2020	Stephen Odey (Note: The PDP's Stephen Odey and Agom Jarigbe fought in court over the by-election's PDP nomination; Odey won both initial court decisions and the by-election before taking office late in December 2020. However, Jarigbe later won several court challenges which declared him the legitimate PDP nominee and thus Senator. Jarigbe took office in September 2021.)	PDP
Lagos East	15 June 2020	Adebayo Osinowo	APC	Died	15 December 2020	Tokunbo Abiru	APC
Adamawa North	25 November 2020	Ishaku Elisha Abbo	PDP	Party switch			APC
Delta North	25 June 2021	Peter Nwaoboshi	PDP	Party switch			APC
Zamfara Central	29 June 2021	Hassan Muhammed Gusau	PDP	Party switch			APC
Zamfara North	29 June 2021	Sahabi Alhaji Yaú	PDP	Party switch			APC
Zamfara West	29 June 2021	Lawali Hassan Anka	PDP	Party switch			APC
Cross River North	30 July 2021	Stephen Odey	PDP	Court awarded primary election win to opponent	15 September 2021	Agom Jarigbe	PDP
Anambra North	26 August 2021	Stella Oduah	PDP	Party switch			APC
Taraba South	3 February 2022	Emmanuel Bwacha	PDP	Party switch			APC
Zamfara Central	23 February 2022	Hassan Muhammed Gusau	APC	Member appointed Zamfara Deputy Governor	Vacant		
Borno North	12 April 2022	Abubakar Kyari	APC	Resigned	Vacant		
Nasarawa West	12 April 2022	Abdullahi Adamu	APC	Resigned	Vacant		
Katsina North	20 April 2022	Ahmad Babba Kaita	APC	Party switch			PDP
Sokoto South	27 April 2022	Ibrahim Abdullahi Danbaba	PDP	Party switch			APC
Anambra North	28 April 2022	Stella Oduah	APC	Party switch			PDP
Oyo South	6 May 2022	Mohammed Kola Balogun	PDP	Party switch			APC
Kano Central	18 May 2022	Ibrahim Shekarau	APC	Party switch			NNPP
Abia South	27 May 2022	Enyinnaya Abaribe	PDP	Party switch			APGA
Kebbi Central	28 May 2022	Adamu Aliero	APC	Party switch			PDP
Bauchi South	31 May 2022	Lawal Yahaya Gumau	APC	Party switch			NNPP
Edo North	3 June 2022	Francis Alimikhena	APC	Party switch			PDP
Kebbi North	8 June 2022	Yahaya Abubakar Abdullahi	APC	Party switch			PDP
Bauchi Central	19 June 2022	Halliru Dauda Jika	APC	Party switch			NNPP
Imo East	21 June 2022	Ezenwa Francis Onyewuchi	PDP	Party switch			LP
Nasarawa North	1 July 2022	Godiya Akwashiki	APC	Party switch			SDP
Akwa Ibom North-East	15 July 2022	Bassey Albert Akpan	PDP	Party switch			YPP
Kano Central	29 August 2022	Ibrahim Shekarau	NNPP	Party switch			PDP
Bauchi North	9 November 2022	Adamu Muhammad Bulkachuwa	APC	Party switch			PDP

== Abia State ==
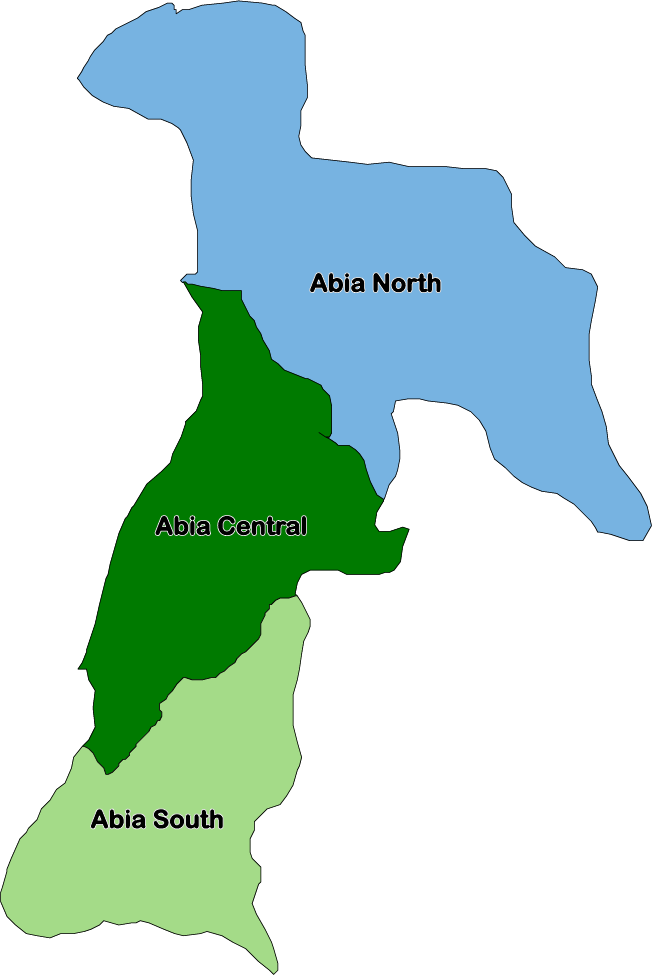
APC incumbent running APGA incumbent running PDP incumbent retiring

District	Incumbent		Results	
District	Incumbent	Party	Status	Candidates
Abia Central	Theodore Orji	PDP	Incumbent retired New member elected LP gain	▌ Darlington Nwokocha (LP); ▌Sam Onuigbo (APC); ▌Ahamdi Emmanuel Nweke (APGA); ▌ ✓ Augustine Akobundu (PDP)
Abia North	Orji Uzor Kalu	APC	Incumbent re-elected	▌ ✓ Orji Uzor Kalu (APC); ▌Carol Dike-Okorafor (APGA); ▌Mao Ohuabunwa (PDP)
Abia South	Enyinnaya Abaribe	APGA (Note: This senator was elected as a member of the PDP but switched to APGA during their term.)	Incumbent re-elected	▌ ✓ Enyinnaya Abaribe (APGA); ▌Blessing Nwagba (APC); ▌Okezie Ikpeazu (PDP)

== Adamawa State ==
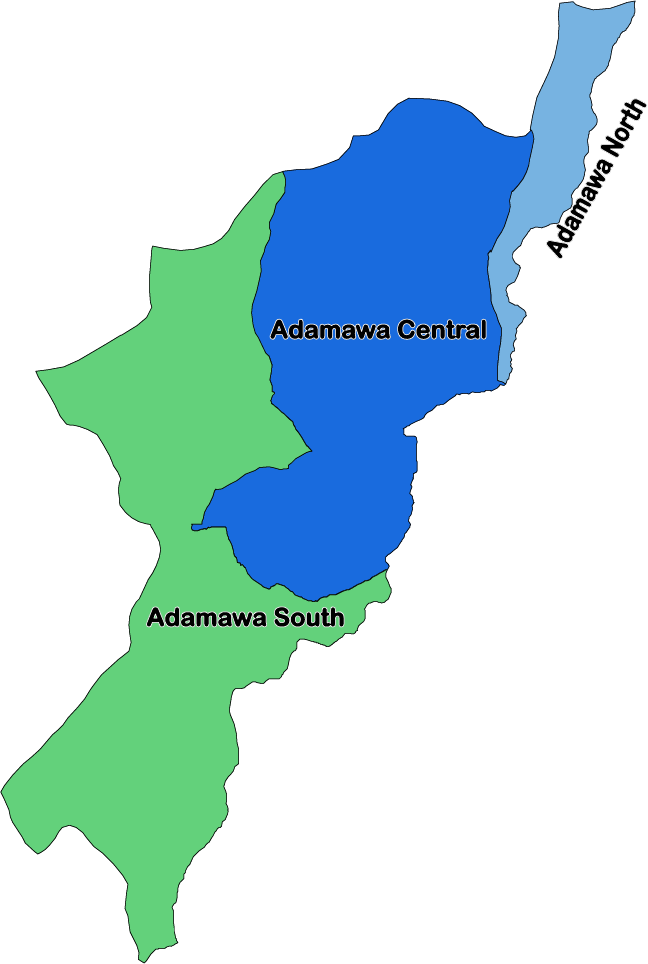
APC incumbent retiring APC incumbent running PDP incumbent running

District	Incumbent		Results	
District	Incumbent	Party	Status	Candidates
Adamawa Central	Aishatu Dahiru Ahmed	APC	Incumbent retired New member elected PDP gain	▌Abdul-Aziz Nyako (APC); ▌Ahmadu Hamman (NNPP); ▌ ✓ Aminu Iya Abbas (PDP)
Adamawa North	Ishaku Elisha Abbo	APC (Note: This senator was elected as a member of the PDP but switched to the APC during their term.)	Incumbent re-elected	▌ ✓ Ishaku Elisha Abbo (APC); ▌Abdullahi Dauda Belel (NNPP); ▌Amos Yohana (PDP)
Adamawa South	Binos Dauda Yaroe	PDP	Incumbent re-elected	▌Adamu Ismaila Numan (APC); ▌ ✓ Binos Dauda Yaroe (PDP)

== Akwa Ibom State ==
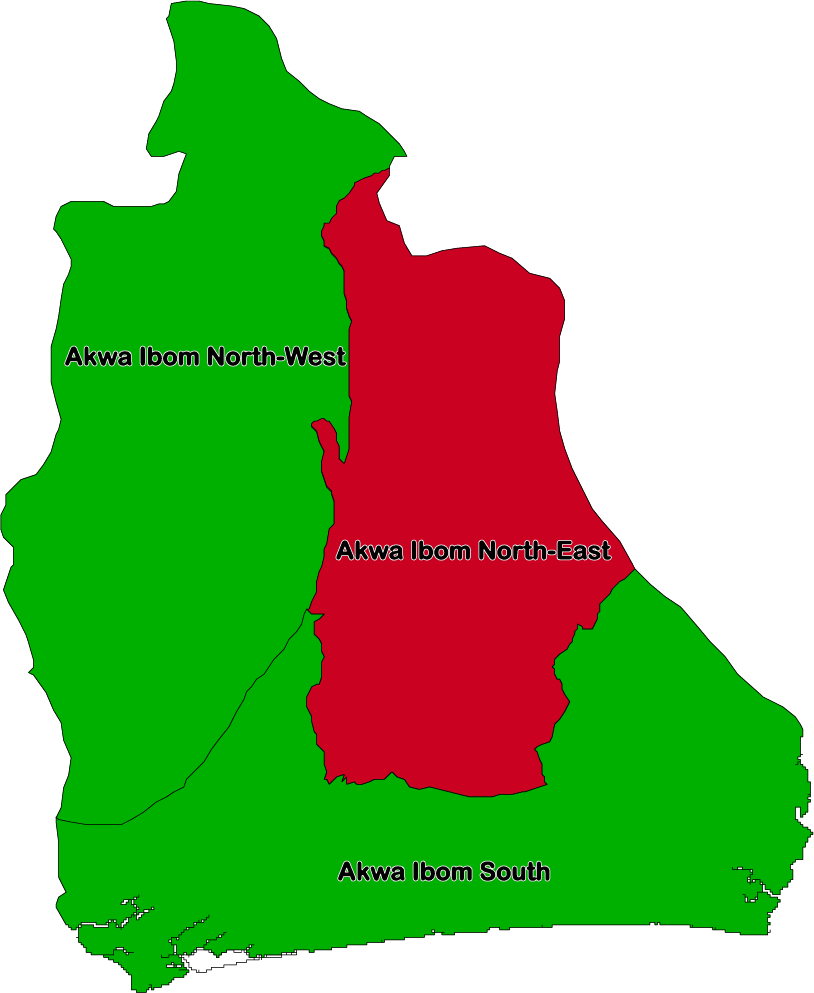
PDP incumbent retiring YPP incumbent retiring

District	Incumbent		Results	
District	Incumbent	Party	Status	Candidates
Akwa Ibom North-East	Bassey Albert Akpan	YPP (Note: This senator was elected as a member of the PDP but switched to the YPP during their term.)	Incumbent retired New member elected PDP gain	▌Ndem Ndem (APC); ▌ ✓ Aniekan Bassey (PDP)
Akwa Ibom North-West	Chris Ekpenyong	PDP	Incumbent retired New member elected APC gain	▌ ✓ Godswill Akpabio (APC); ▌Emmanuel Enoidem (PDP)
Akwa Ibom South	Akon Eyakenyi	PDP	Incumbent retired New member elected PDP hold	▌Martins Udo-Inyang (APC); ▌ ✓ Ekong Sampson (PDP)

== Anambra State ==
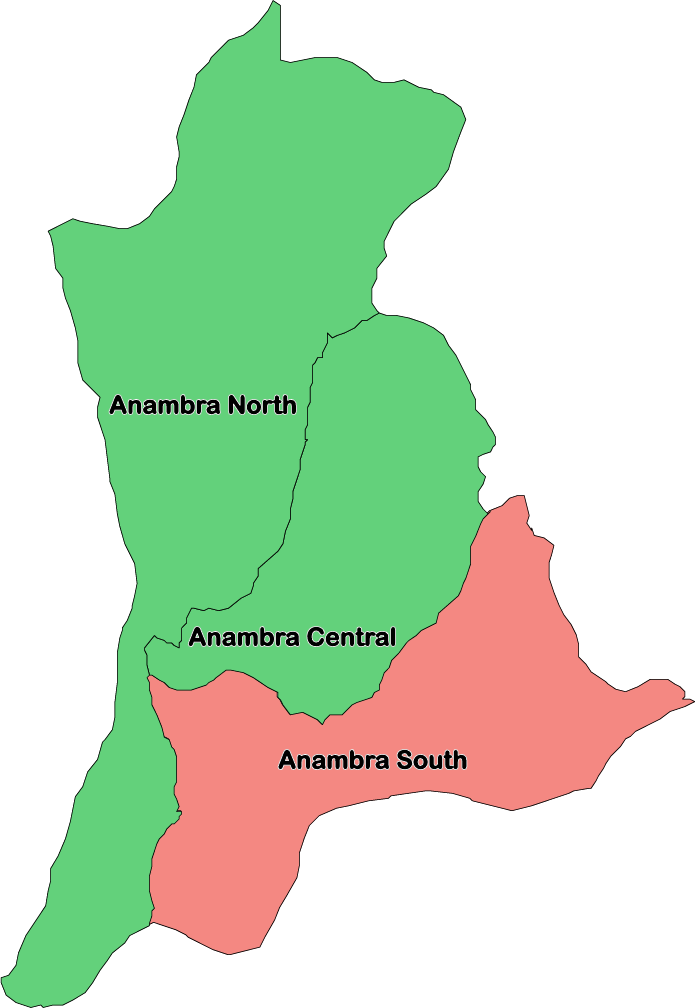
PDP incumbent running YPP incumbent running

District	Incumbent		Results	
District	Incumbent	Party	Status	Candidates
Anambra Central	Uche Ekwunife	PDP	Incumbent lost re-election New member elected LP gain	▌Kodilichukwu Okelekwe (APC); ▌Dozie Nwankwo (APGA); ▌ ✓ Victor Umeh (LP); ▌Uche Ekwunife (PDP)
Anambra North	Stella Oduah	PDP (Note: This senator was elected as a member of the PDP but switched to the APC then back to the PDP during their term.)	Incumbent lost re-election New member elected LP gain	▌Ifeyinwa Anazonwu (APC); ▌Ebelechukwu Obiano (APGA); ▌ ✓ Tony Nwoye (LP); ▌Stella Oduah (PDP)
Anambra South	Ifeanyi Ubah	YPP	Incumbent re-elected	▌Chukwuma Michael Umeoji (APC); ▌TBD (APGA); ▌Obinna Uzoh (LP); ▌Chris Uba (PDP); ▌ ✓ Ifeanyi Ubah (YPP)

== Bauchi State ==
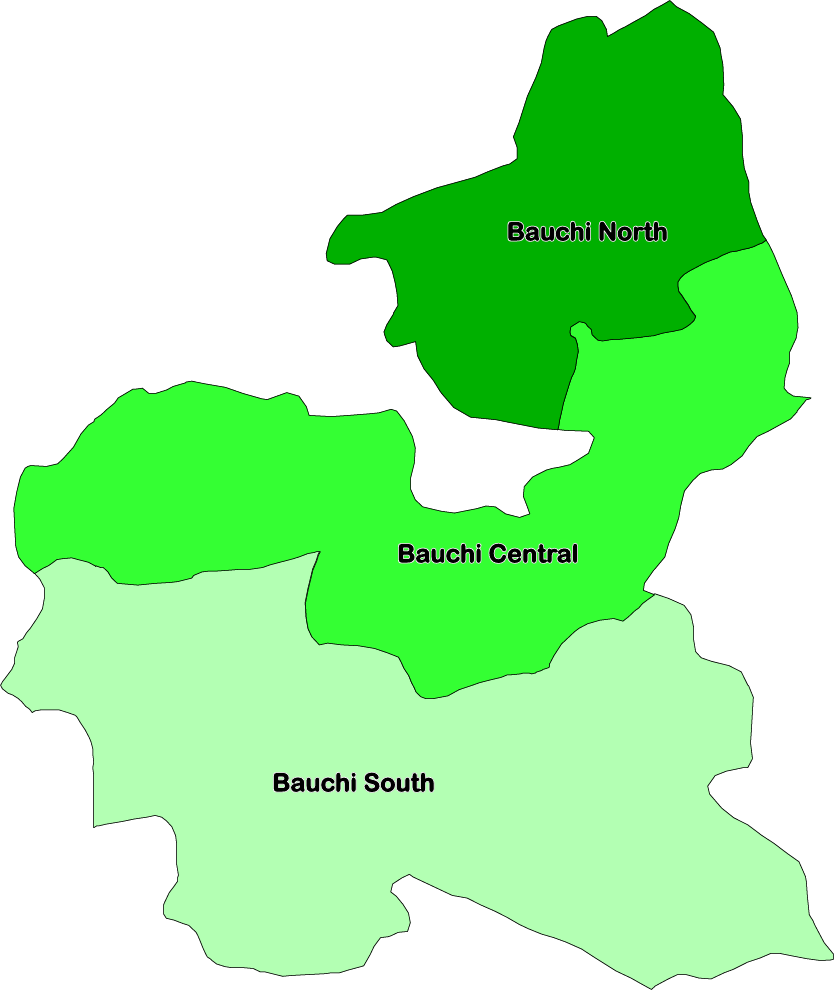
NNPP incumbent retiring NNPP incumbent running PDP incumbent retiring or lost renomination

District	Incumbent		Results	
District	Incumbent	Party	Status	Candidates
Bauchi Central	Halliru Dauda Jika	NNPP (Note: This House member was elected as a member of the APC but switched to the NNPP during their term.)	Incumbent retired New member elected PDP gain	▌Uba Ahmed Nana (APC); ▌ ✓ Abdul Ahmed Ningi (PDP)
Bauchi North	Adamu Muhammad Bulkachuwa	PDP (Note: This senator was elected as a member of the APC but switched to the PDP during their term.)	Incumbent lost renomination (Note: Senator defection); New member elected PDP hold	▌Siraj Ibrahim Tanko Muhammad (APC); ▌ ✓ Sama'ila Dahuwa (PDP)
Bauchi South	Lawal Yahaya Gumau	NNPP	Incumbent lost renomination Incumbent lost re-election under nomination of new party New member elected APC gain	▌ ✓ Shehu Buba Umar (APC); ▌Lawal Yahaya Gumau (NNPP); ▌Dahiru Garba (PDP)

== Bayelsa State ==
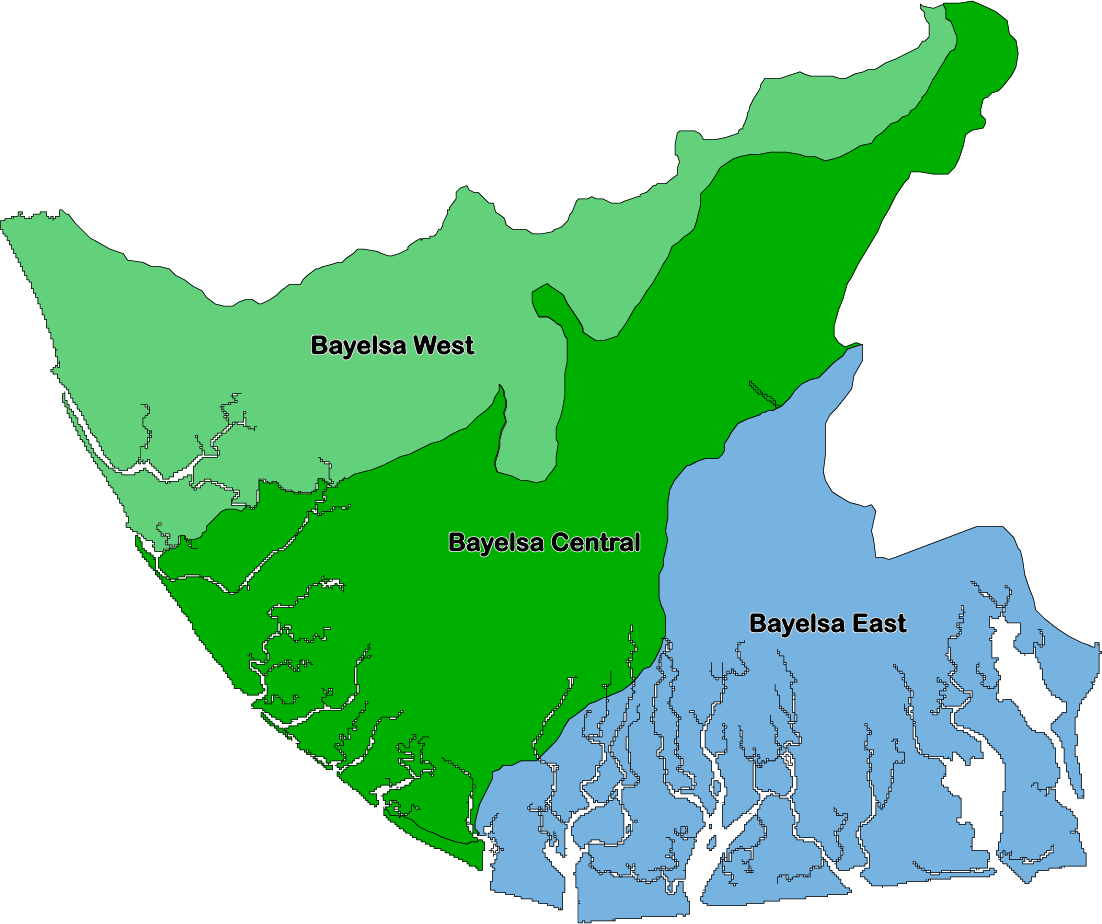
APC incumbent running PDP incumbent lost renomination PDP incumbent running

District	Incumbent		Results	
District	Incumbent	Party	Status	Candidates
Bayelsa Central	Moses Cleopas	PDP	Incumbent lost renomination New member elected PDP hold	▌Timipa Tiwei Orunimighe (APC); ▌ ✓ Kombowei Benson (PDP)
Bayelsa East	Biobarakuma Degi	APC	Incumbent lost re-election New member elected PDP gain	▌Biobarakuma Degi (APC); ▌ ✓ Benson Agadaga (PDP)
Bayelsa West	Henry Seriake Dickson	PDP	Incumbent re-elected	▌Wilson Ayakpo Dauyegha (APC); ▌ ✓ Henry Seriake Dickson (PDP)

== Benue State ==
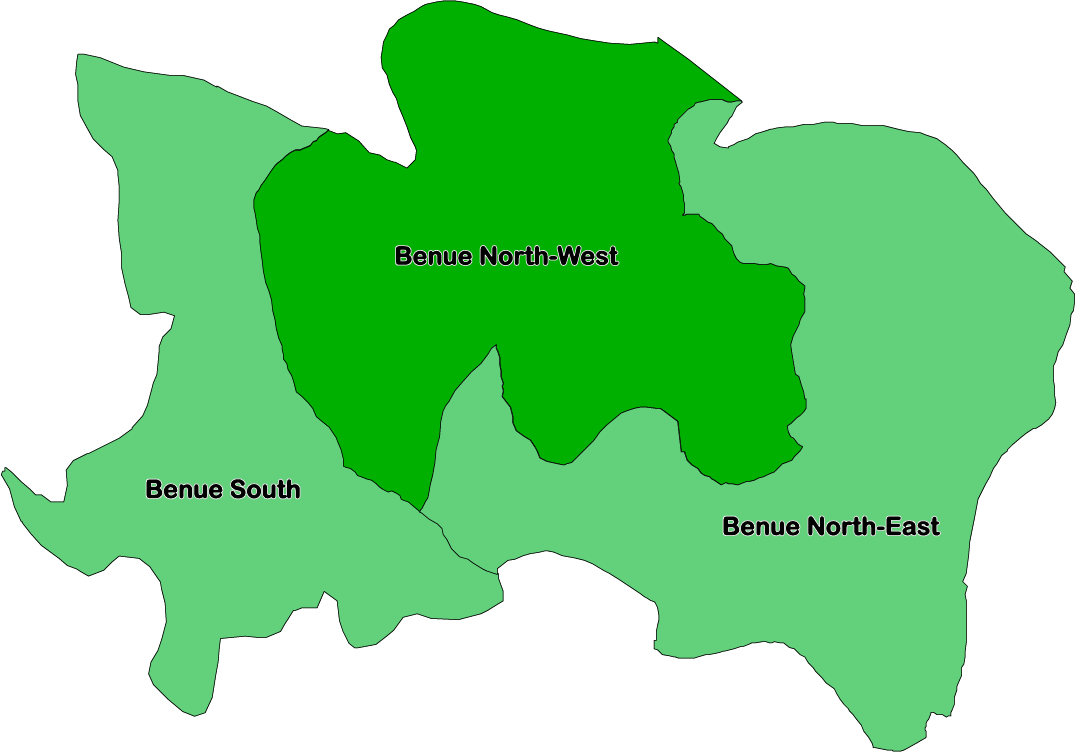
PDP incumbent retiring PDP incumbent running

District	Incumbent		Results	
District	Incumbent	Party	Status	Candidates
Benue North-East	Gabriel Suswam	PDP	Incumbent lost re-election New member elected APC gain	▌ ✓ Emmanuel Memga Udende (APC); ▌Gabriel Suswam (PDP)
Benue North-West	Emmanuel Yisa Orker-Jev	PDP	Incumbent retired New member elected APC gain	▌ ✓ Titus Zam (APC); ▌Samuel Ortom (PDP)
Benue South	Patrick Abba Moro	PDP	Incumbent re-elected	▌Daniel Onjeh (APC); ▌ ✓ Patrick Abba Moro (PDP)

== Borno State ==
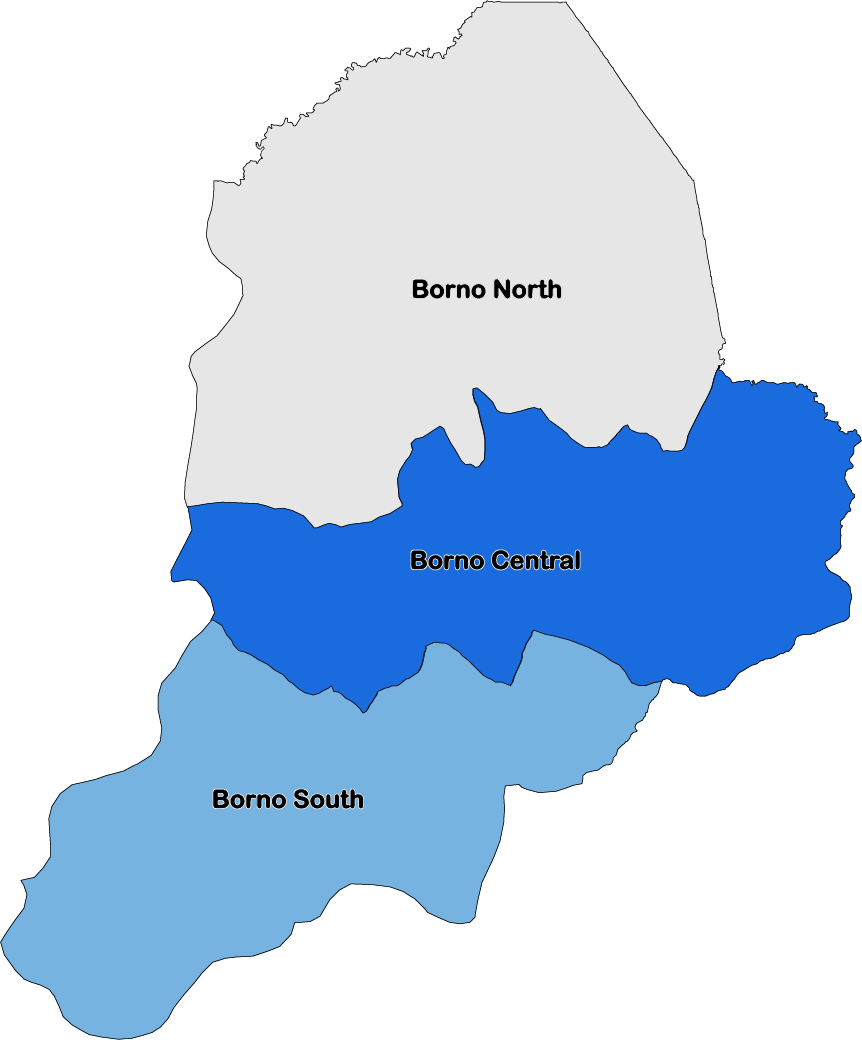
APC incumbent retiring APC incumbent running Vacant

District	Incumbent		Results	
District	Incumbent	Party	Status	Candidates
Borno Central	Kashim Shettima	APC	Incumbent withdrew from nomination New member elected APC gain	▌ ✓ Shehu Lawan (APC); ▌Mohammed Umara Kumalia (PDP)
Borno North	Vacant		New member elected APC gain	▌ ✓ Mohammed Tahir Monguno (APC); ▌Isa Lawan (PDP)
Borno South	Mohammed Ali Ndume	APC	Incumbent re-elected	▌ ✓ Mohammed Ali Ndume (APC); ▌Kudla Milinda Satumari (PDP)

== Cross River State ==
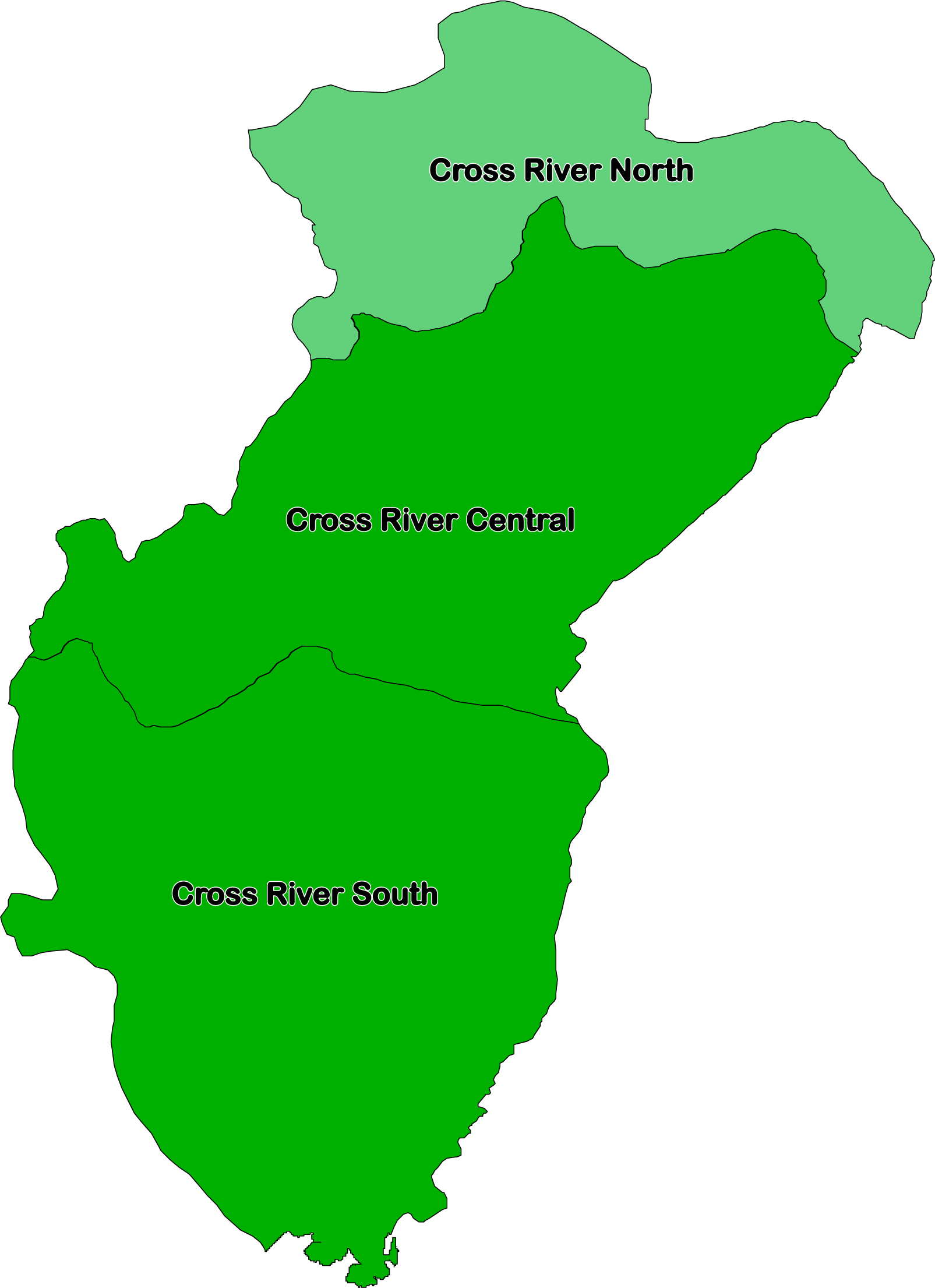
PDP incumbent retiring PDP incumbent running

District	Incumbent		Results	
District	Incumbent	Party	Status	Candidates
Cross River Central	Sandy Ojang Onor	PDP	Incumbent retired New member elected APC gain	▌ ✓ Eteng Williams (APC); ▌Bassey Ewa (PDP)
Cross River North	Agom Jarigbe	PDP	Incumbent re-elected	▌Benedict Ayade (APC); ▌ ✓ Agom Jarigbe (PDP)
Cross River South	Gershom Bassey	PDP	Incumbent retired New member elected APC gain	▌ ✓ Asuquo Ekpenyong (APC); ▌Ekpo Okon (PDP)

== Delta State ==
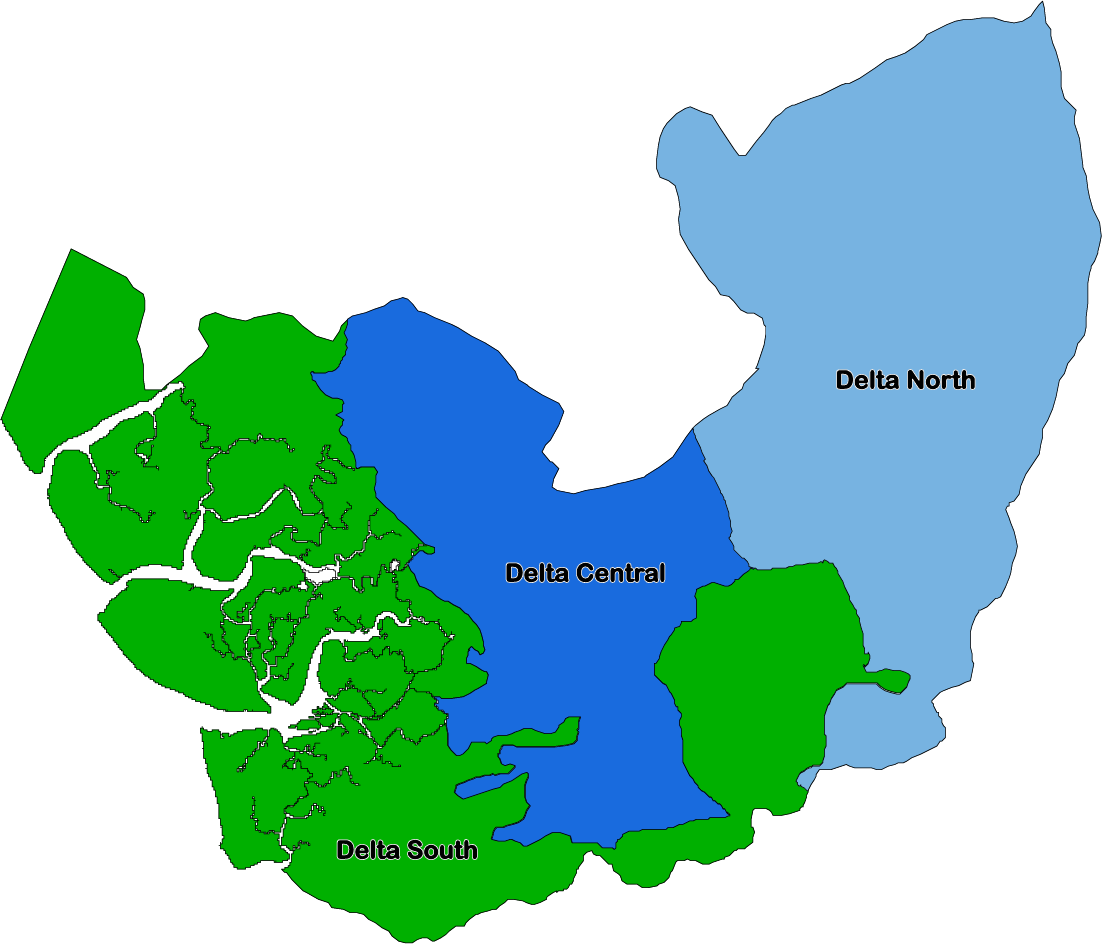
APC incumbent retiring APC incumbent running PDP incumbent retiring

District	Incumbent		Results	
District	Incumbent	Party	Status	Candidates
Delta Central	Ovie Omo-Agege	APC	Incumbent retired New member elected APC hold	▌ ✓ Ede Dafinone (APC); ▌Ighoyota Amori (PDP)
Delta North	Peter Nwaoboshi	APC (Note: This senator was elected as a member of the PDP but switched to the APC during their term.)	Incumbent lost re-election New member elected PDP gain	▌Peter Nwaoboshi (APC); ▌ ✓ Ned Nwoko (PDP)
Delta South	James Manager	PDP	Incumbent retired New member elected APC gain	▌ ✓ Joel-Onowakpo Thomas (APC); ▌Michael Diden (PDP)

== Ebonyi State ==
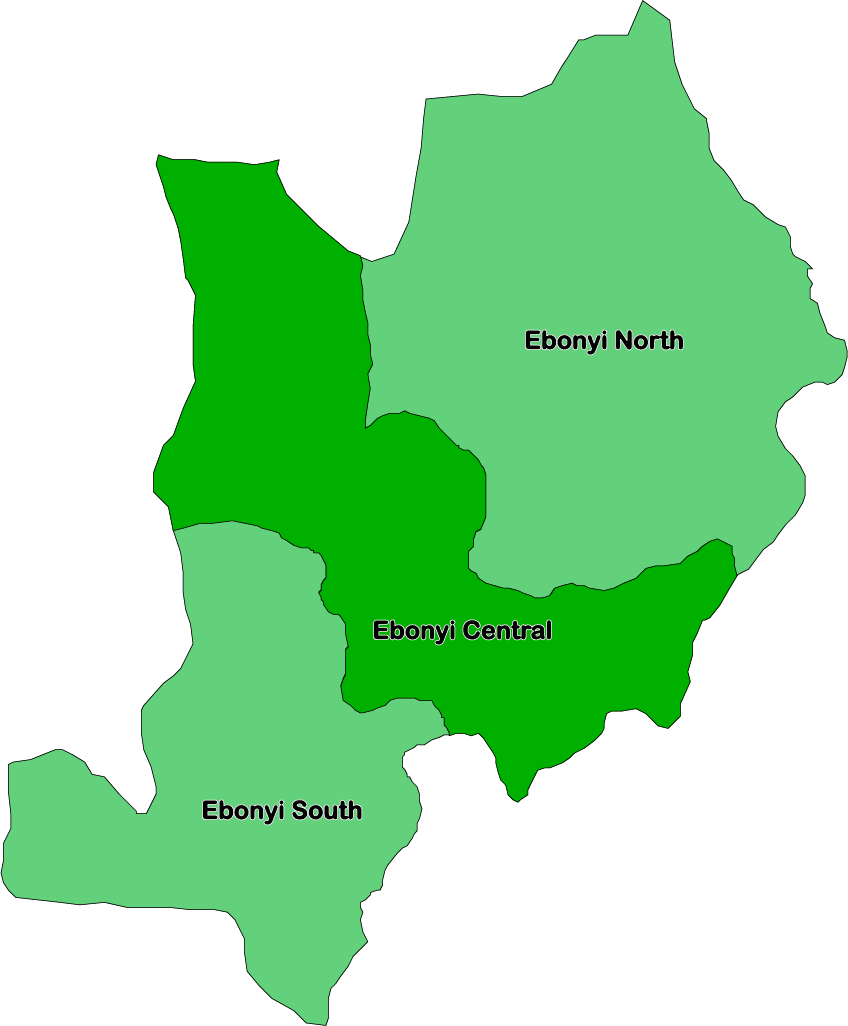
PDP incumbent retiring PDP incumbent running

District	Incumbent		Results	
District	Incumbent	Party	Status	Candidates
Ebonyi Central	Joseph Ogba	PDP	Incumbent retired New member elected APC gain	▌ ✓ Kenneth Eze (APC); ▌Lazarus Ogbe (PDP)
Ebonyi North	Sam Egwu	PDP	Incumbent lost re-election New member elected APC gain	▌ ✓ Onyekachi Nwaebonyi (APC); ▌Sam Egwu (PDP)
Ebonyi South	Michael Ama Nnachi	PDP	Incumbent lost re-election New member elected APC gain	▌ ✓ Dave Umahi (APC); ▌Ifeanyi Eleje (APGA); ▌Linus Abaa Okorie (LP); ▌Michael Ama Nnachi (PDP)

== Edo State ==
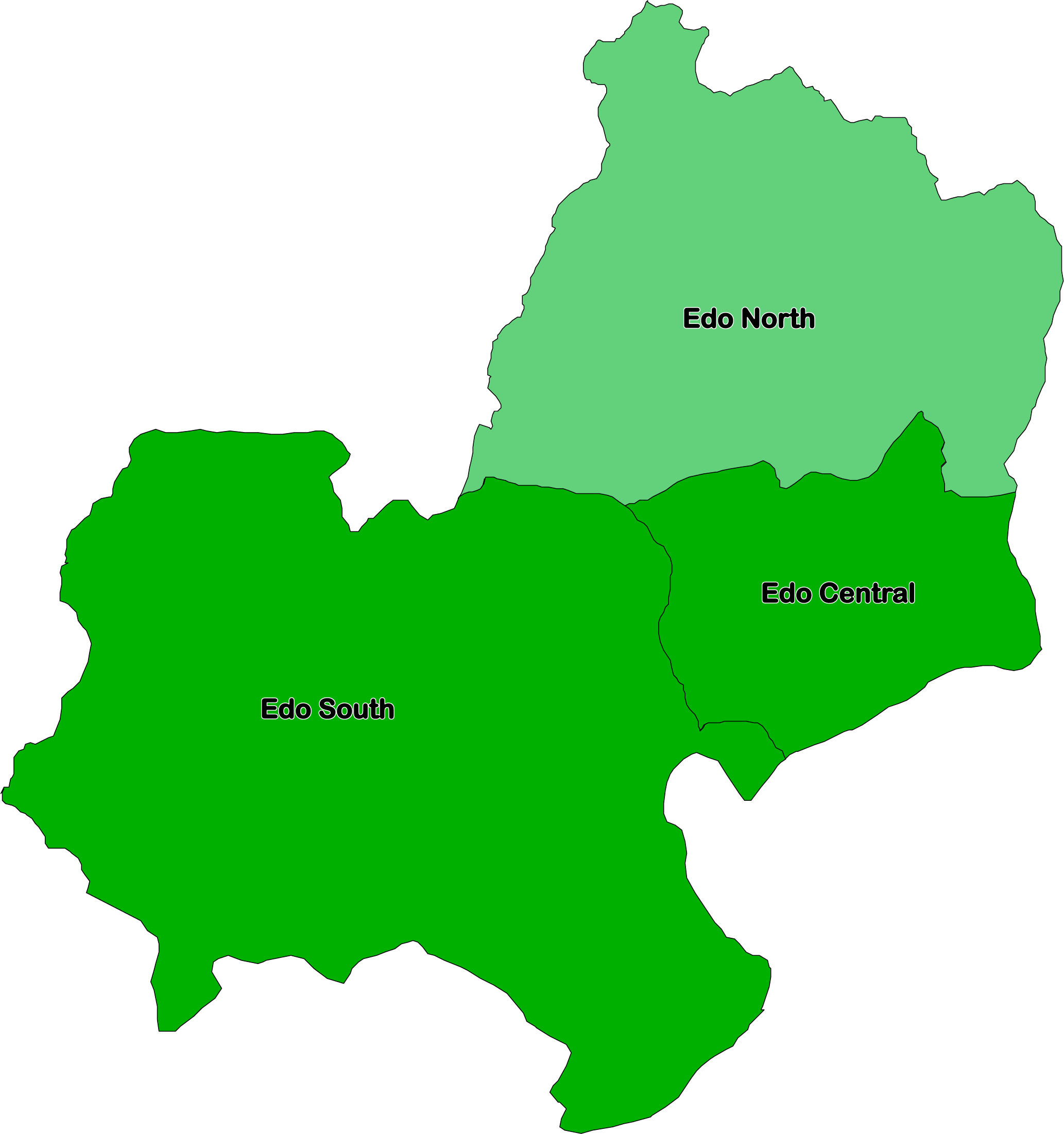
PDP incumbent status unknown or lost renomination PDP incumbent running

District	Incumbent		Results	
District	Incumbent	Party	Status	Candidates
Edo Central	Clifford Ordia	PDP	Incumbent lost re-election New member elected APC gain	▌ ✓ Monday Okpebholo (APC); ▌Clifford Ordia (PDP)
Edo North	Francis Alimikhena	PDP (Note: This senator was elected as a member of the APC but switched to the PDP during their term.)	Incumbent withdrew from primary (Note: Senator defected to new party after withdrawing from or losing their former party's primary.); Incumbent lost re-election under nomination of new party New member elected APC gain	▌ ✓ Adams Oshiomhole (APC); ▌Francis Alimikhena
Edo South	Matthew Urhoghide	PDP	Incumbent lost renomination New member elected LP gain	▌Valentine Asuen (APC); ▌ ✓ Neda Imasuen (LP); ▌Matthew Iduoriyekemwen (PDP)

== Ekiti State ==
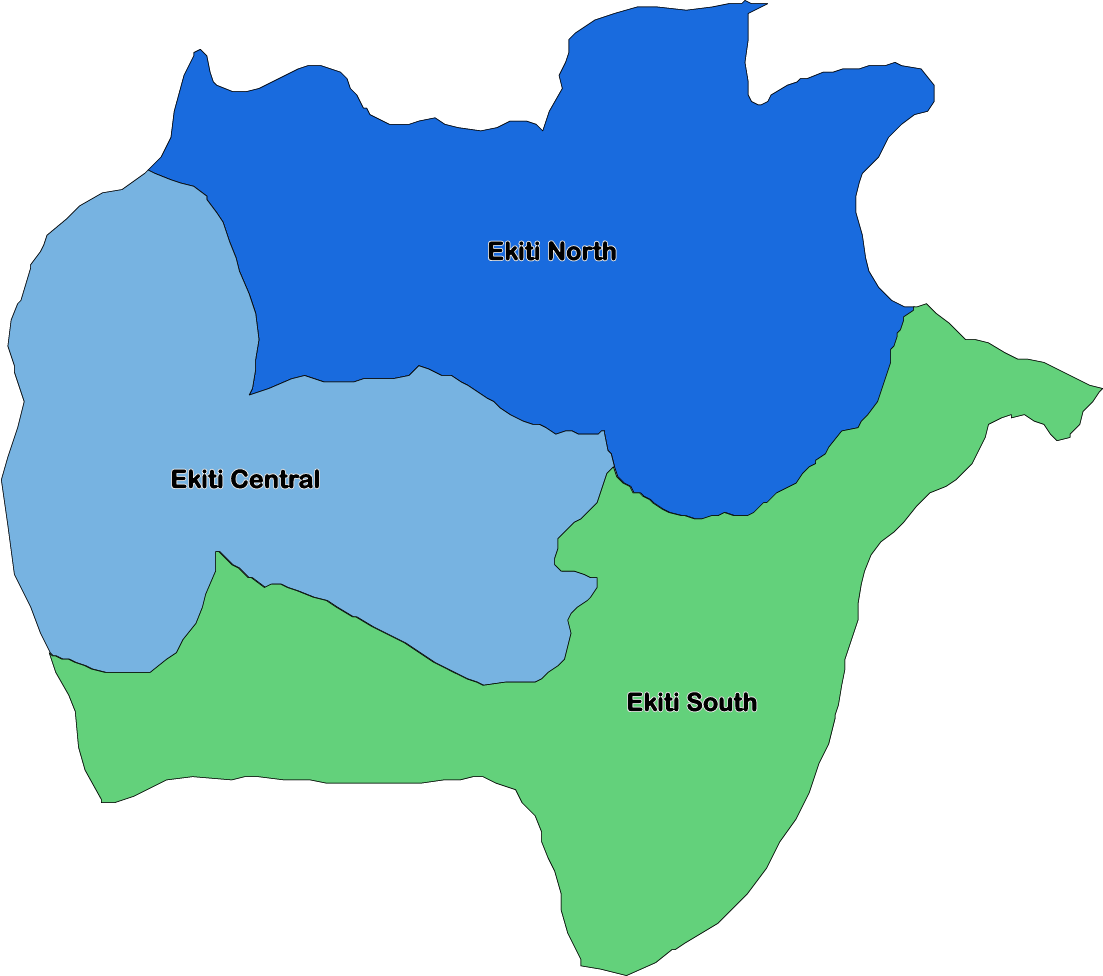
APC incumbent retiring APC incumbent running PDP incumbent running

District	Incumbent		Results	
District	Incumbent	Party	Status	Candidates
Ekiti Central	Michael Opeyemi Bamidele	APC	Incumbent re-elected	▌ ✓ Michael Opeyemi Bamidele (APC); ▌Lateef Ajijola (PDP)
Ekiti North	Olubunmi Ayodeji Adetunmbi	APC	Incumbent lost renomination New member elected APC hold	▌ ✓ Cyril Fasuyi (APC); ▌Funso Ayeni (PDP)
Ekiti South	Abiodun Olujimi	PDP	Incumbent lost re-election New member elected APC gain	▌ ✓ Raphael Adeyemi Adaramodu (APC); ▌Abiodun Olujimi (PDP)

== Enugu State ==
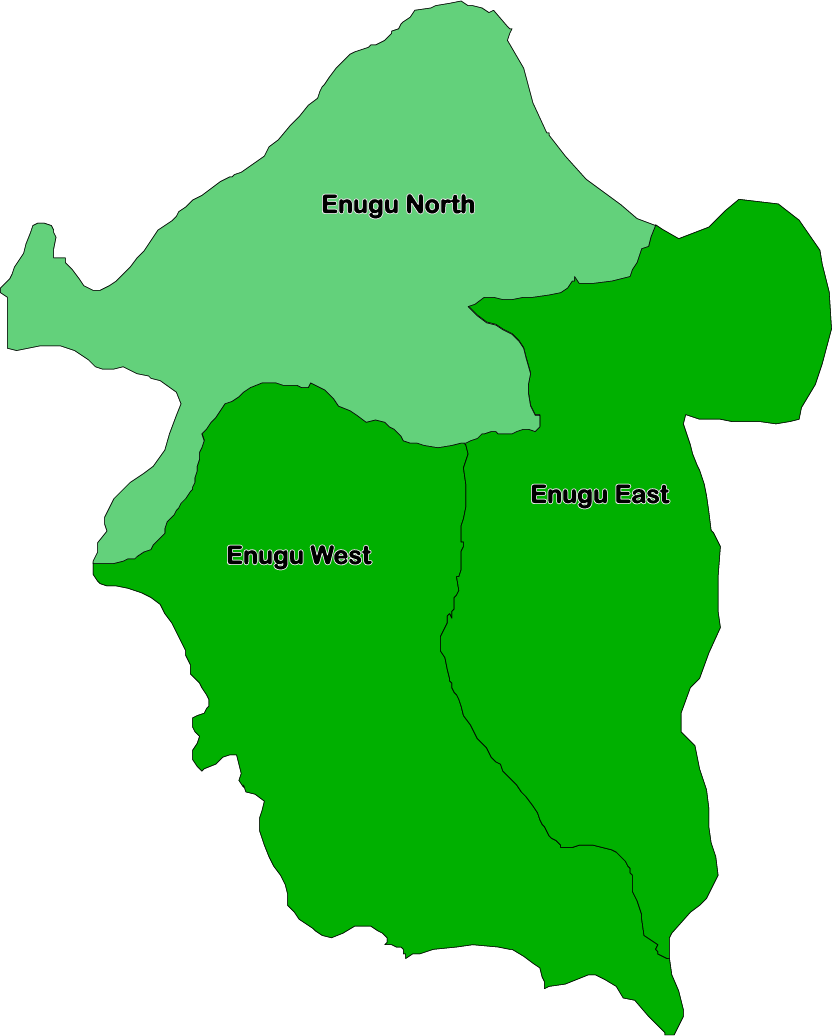
PDP incumbent retiring PDP incumbent running

District	Incumbent		Results
District	Incumbent	Party	Status	Candidates
Enugu East	Chimaroke Nnamani	PDP	Incumbent renominated	▌Adaku Ogbu-Aguocha (APC); ▌Chimaroke Nnamani (PDP); ▌Kelvin Chukwu (LP)
Enugu North	Utazi Chukwuka	PDP	Incumbent retired New member elected LP gain	▌Simon Ejike Eze (APC); ▌ ✓ Okechukwu Ezea (LP); ▌Ifeanyi Ugwuanyi (PDP)
Enugu West	Ike Ekweremadu	PDP	Incumbent retired New member elected PDP hold	▌Nicholas Chika Ezeh (APC); ▌ ✓ Osita Ngwu (PDP)

== Federal Capital Territory ==
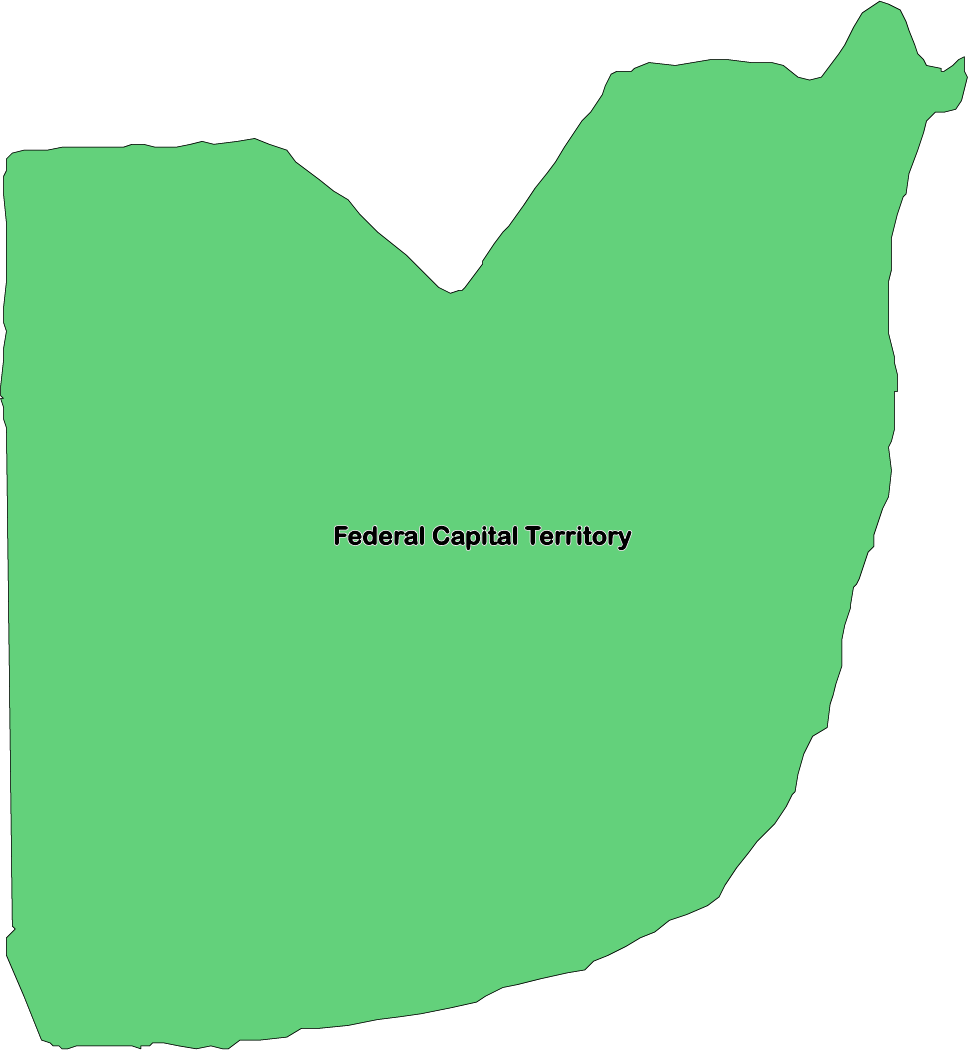
PDP incumbent running

District	Incumbent		Results	
District	Incumbent	Party	Status	Candidates
FCT	Philips Tanimu Aduda	PDP	Incumbent lost re-election New member elected LP gain	▌Angulu Zakari (APC); ▌ ✓ Ireti Kingibe (LP); ▌Philips Tanimu Aduda (PDP)

== Gombe State ==
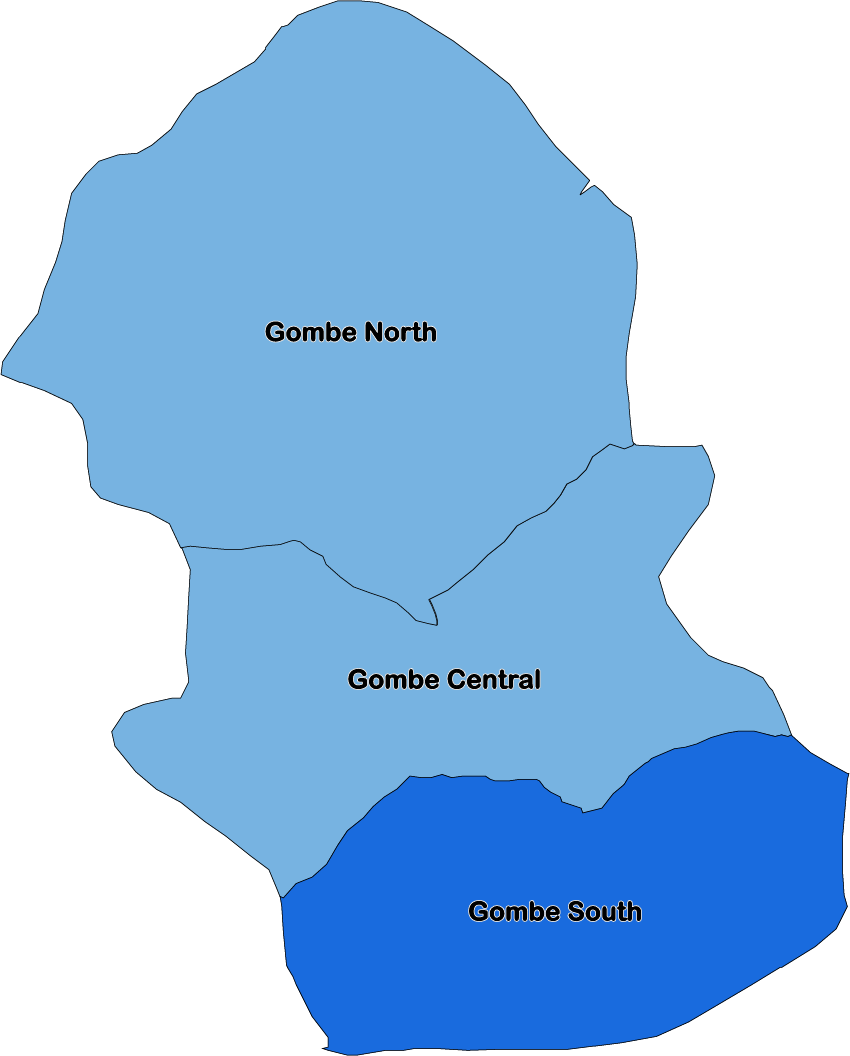
APC incumbent lost renomination APC incumbent running

District	Incumbent		Results	
District	Incumbent	Party	Status	Candidates
Gombe Central	Mohammed Danjuma Goje	APC	Incumbent re-elected	▌ ✓ Mohammed Danjuma Goje (APC); ▌Abubakar Aliyu (PDP)
Gombe North	Sa'idu Ahmed Alkali	APC	Incumbent lost re-election New member elected PDP gain	▌Sa'idu Ahmed Alkali (APC); ▌ ✓ Ibrahim Hassan Dankwambo (PDP)
Gombe South	Amos Bulus Kilawangs	APC	Incumbent lost renomination New member elected PDP gain	▌Joshua M. Lidani (APC); ▌ ✓ Anthony Siyako Yaro (PDP)

== Imo State ==
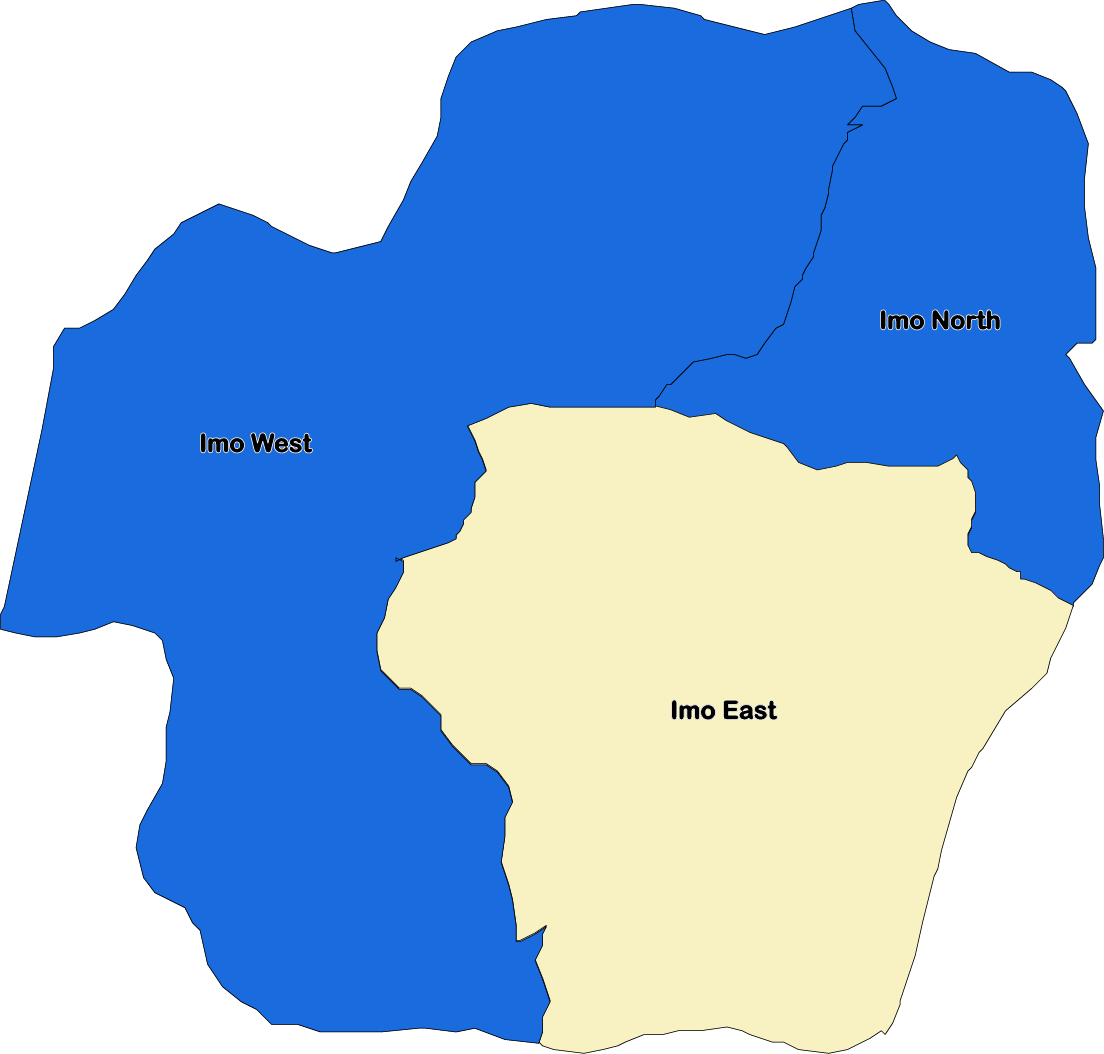
APC incumbent retiring or lost renomination LP incumbent running

District	Incumbent		Results	
District	Incumbent	Party	Status	Candidates
Imo East	Ezenwa Francis Onyewuchi	LP (Note: This senator was elected as a member of the PDP but switched to the LP during their term.)	Incumbent lost renomination (Note: Senator defected to new party after withdrawing from or losing their former party's primary.); Incumbent re-elected under nomination of new party LP gain	▌Alex Mbata (APC); ▌ ✓ Ezenwa Francis Onyewuchi (LP); ▌Uche Onyegucha (PDP)
Imo North	Chukwuma Frank Ibezim	APC	Incumbent lost renomination New member elected APC hold	▌ ✓ Patrick Ndubueze (APC); ▌Emmanuel Okewulonu (PDP)
Imo West	Rochas Okorocha	APC	Incumbent retired New member elected APC hold	▌ ✓ Osita Izunaso (APC)

== Jigawa State ==
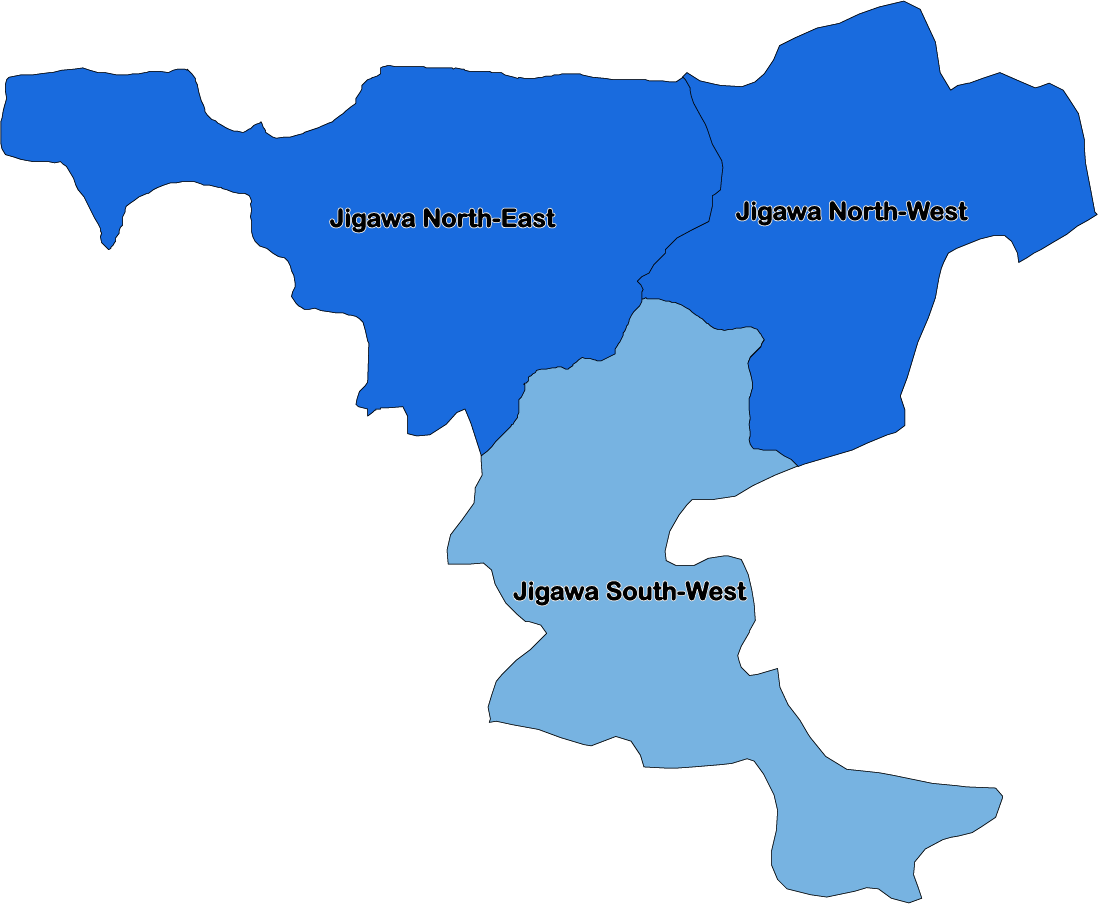
APC incumbent retiring or lost renomination APC incumbent running

District	Incumbent		Results	
District	Incumbent	Party	Status	Candidates
Jigawa North-East	Ibrahim Hassan Hadejia	APC	Incumbent retired New member elected APC hold	▌ ✓ Ahmad Abdulhamid Malam Madori (APC); ▌Nuruddeen Muhammad (PDP)
Jigawa North-West	Danladi Abdullahi Sankara	APC	Incumbent retired New member elected APC hold	▌ ✓ Babangida Hussaini (APC); ▌Ibrahim Saminu Turaki (PDP)
Jigawa South-West	Mohammed Sabo Nakudu	APC	Incumbent lost re-election New member elected PDP gain	▌Mohammed Sabo Nakudu (APC); ▌ ✓ Mustapha Khabeeb (PDP)

== Kaduna State ==
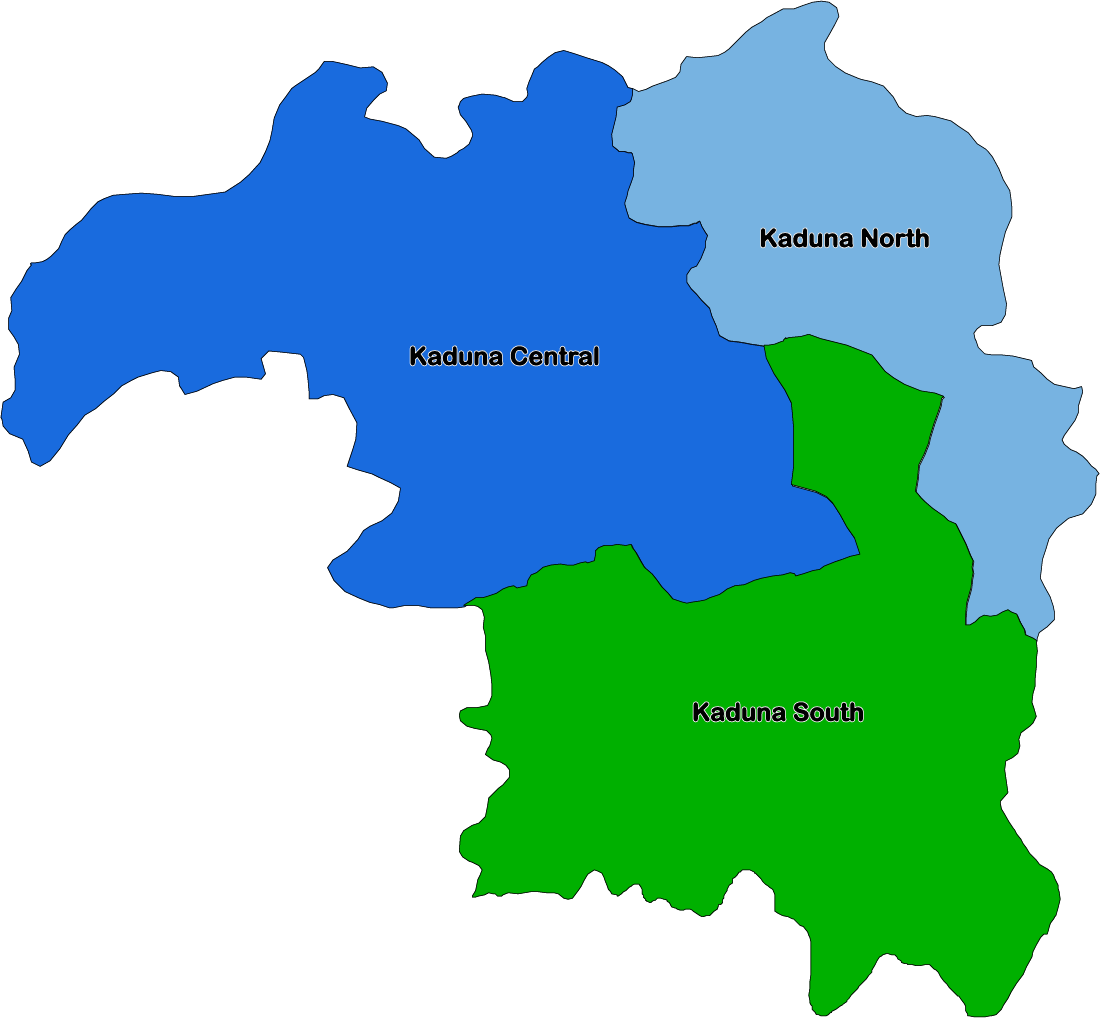
APC incumbent retiring APC incumbent running PDP incumbent lost renomination

District	Incumbent		Results	
District	Incumbent	Party	Status	Candidates
Kaduna Central	Uba Sani	APC	Incumbent retired New member elected PDP gain	▌Muhammad Sani Abdullahi (APC); ▌ ✓ Lawal Adamu Usman (PDP)
Kaduna North	Suleiman Abdu Kwari	APC	Incumbent lost re-election New member elected PDP gain	▌Suleiman Abdu Kwari (APC); ▌Michael Ayuba (LP); ▌ ✓ Khalid Mustapha (PDP)
Kaduna South	Danjuma Laah	PDP	Incumbent lost renomination New member elected PDP hold	▌Bulus Audu (APC); ▌ ✓ Sunday Marshall Katunɡ (PDP)

== Kano State ==
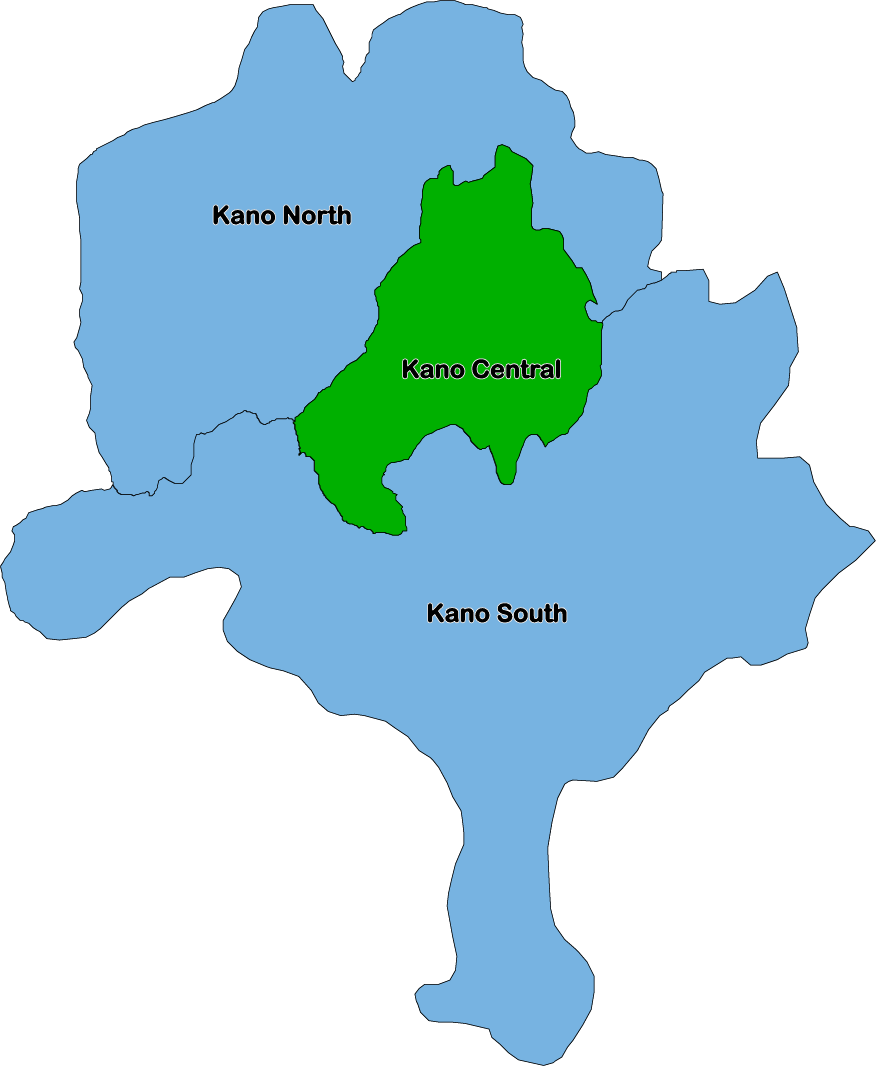
APC incumbent running PDP incumbent status unknown

District	Incumbent		Results	
District	Incumbent	Party	Status	Candidates
Kano Central	Ibrahim Shekarau	PDP (Note: This House member was elected as a member of the APC but switched to the NNPP then to the PDP during their term.)	Incumbent retired after court decision (Note: Shekarau defected from the NNPP to the PDP in August 2022, but he did not formally relinquish the NNPP senatorial nomination and remained listed as the NNPP nominee by INEC. Although the NNPP nominated a replacement—Rufai Sani Hanga, litigation between Sani Hanga and Shekarau dragged past Election Day meaning Shekarau was initially re-elected with the NNPP nomination. However, a Supreme Court decision on 10 March awarded the nomination to Sani Hanga, making him senator-elect.); New member elected NNPP gain	▌Abdulkarim Abdulsalam Zaura (APC); ▌ ✓ Rufai Sani Hanga (NNPP); ▌Laila Buhari (PDP)
Kano North	Barau Jibrin	APC	Incumbent re-elected	▌ ✓ Barau Jibrin (APC); ▌Abdullahi Baffa Bichi (NNPP); ▌Saidu Ahmad Gwadabe (PDP)
Kano South	Kabiru Ibrahim Gaya	APC	Incumbent lost re-election New member elected NNPP gain	▌Kabiru Ibrahim Gaya (APC); ▌ ✓ Suleiman Abdurrahman Kawu Sumaila (NNPP); ▌Muhammad Bashir Galadanchi Hussari (PDP)

== Katsina State ==
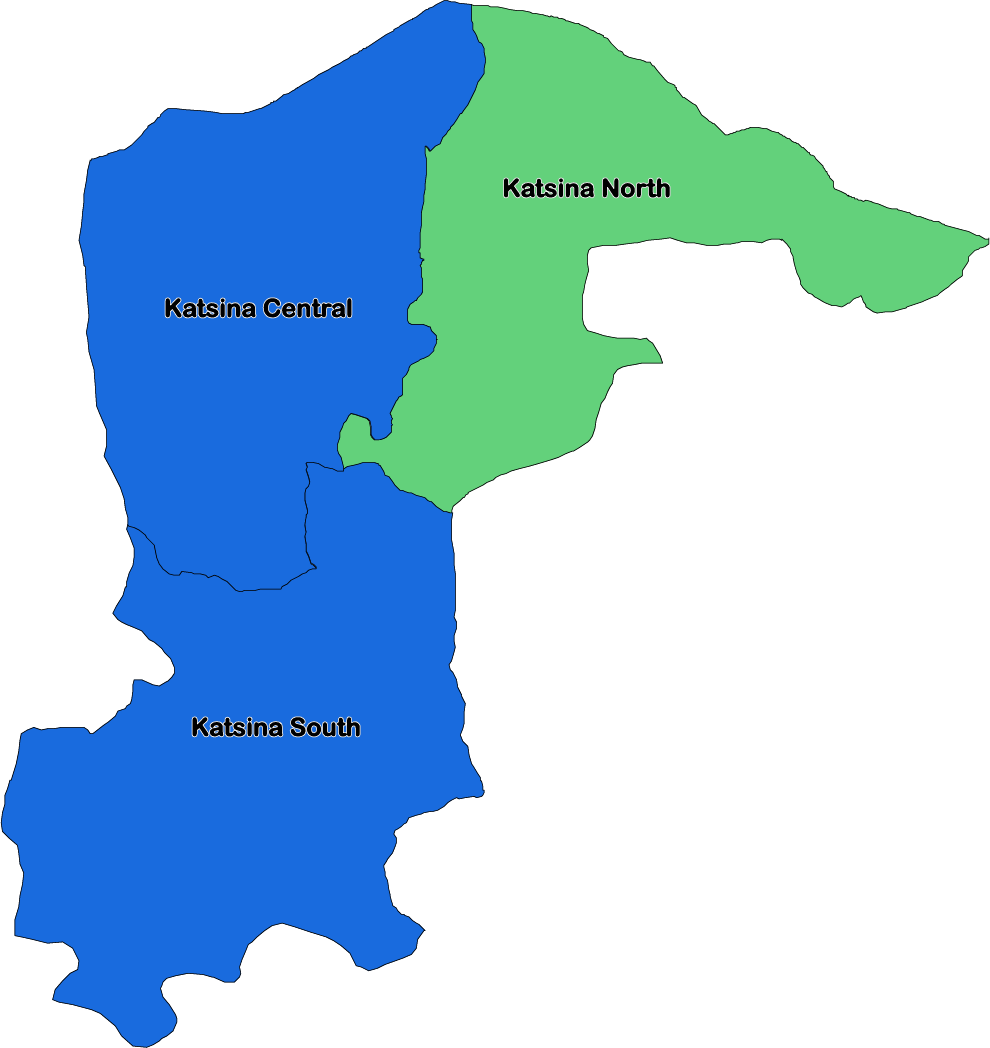
APC incumbent lost renomination PDP incumbent running

District	Incumbent		Results	
District	Incumbent	Party	Status	Candidates
Katsina Central	Kabir Abdullahi Barkiya	APC	Incumbent lost renomination New member elected APC hold	▌ ✓ Abdul'aziz Musa Yar'adua (APC); ▌Sirajo Aminu Makera (PDP)
Katsina North	Ahmad Babba Kaita	PDP (Note: This senator was elected as a member of the APC but switched to the PDP during their term.)	Incumbent lost re-election New member elected APC gain	▌ ✓ Nasiru Sani Zangon Daura (APC); ▌Ahmad Babba Kaita (PDP)
Katsina South	Bello Mandiya	APC	Incumbent lost renomination New member elected APC hold	▌ ✓ Mohammed Muntari Dandutse (APC); ▌Babangida Ibrahim (NNPP); ▌Shehu Garba Matazu (PDP)

== Kebbi State ==
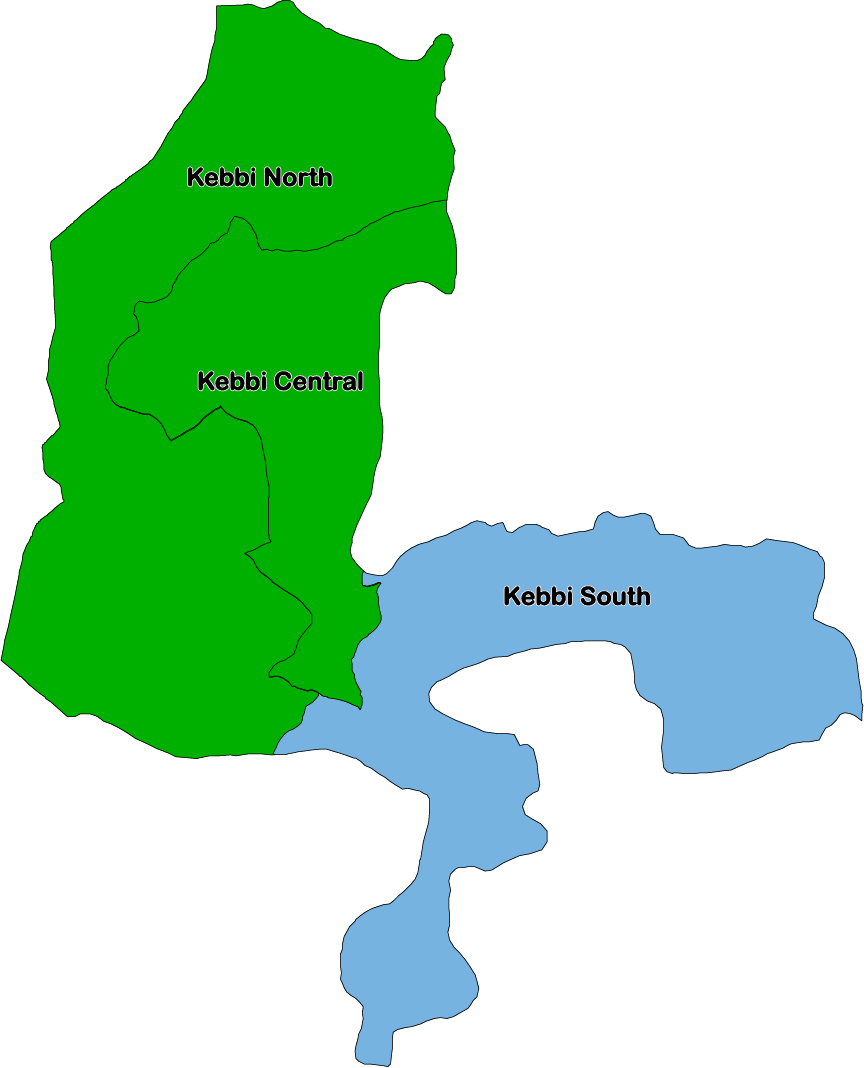
APC incumbent running PDP incumbent status unknown

District	Incumbent		Results	
District	Incumbent	Party	Status	Candidates
Kebbi Central	Adamu Aliero	PDP (Note: This senator was elected as a member of the APC but switched to the PDP during their term.)	Incumbent withdrew from primary (Note: Senator defected to new party after withdrawing from or losing their former party's primary.); Incumbent re-elected under nomination of new party	▌Abubakar Atiku Bagudu (APC); ▌ ✓ Adamu Aliero (PDP)
Kebbi North	Yahaya Abubakar Abdullahi	PDP (Note: This senator was elected as a member of the APC but switched to the PDP during their term.)	Incumbent's status unknown	▌Hussaini Suleiman Kangiwa (APC); ▌TBD (Note: Ibrahim Bawa Kamba or Yahaya Abubakar Abdullahi) (PDP)
Kebbi South	Bala Ibn Na'allah	APC	Incumbent lost re-election New member elected PDP gain	▌Bala Ibn Na'allah (APC); ▌ ✓ Garba Musa Maidoki (PDP)

== Kogi State ==
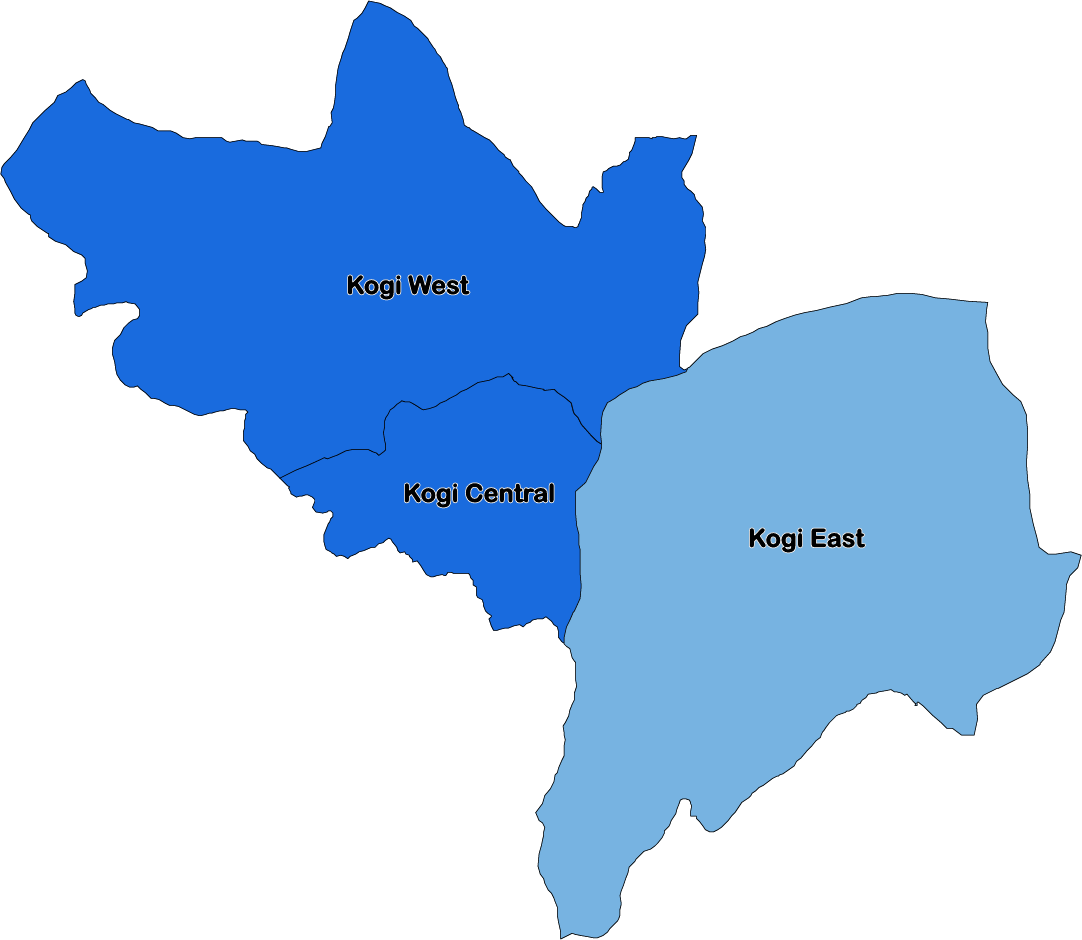
APC incumbent retiring or lost renomination APC incumbent running

District	Incumbent		Results	
District	Incumbent	Party	Status	Candidates
Kogi Central	Yakubu Oseni	APC	Incumbent retired New member elected APC hold	▌ ✓ Abubakar Sadiku Ohere (APC); ▌Natasha Akpoti (PDP)
Kogi East	Jibrin Isah	APC	Incumbent re-elected	▌ ✓ Jibrin Isah (APC); ▌Victor Alewo Adoji (PDP)
Kogi West	Smart Adeyemi	APC	Incumbent lost renomination New member elected APC hold	▌ ✓ Sunday Karimi (APC); ▌Tajudeen Yusuf (PDP)

== Kwara State ==
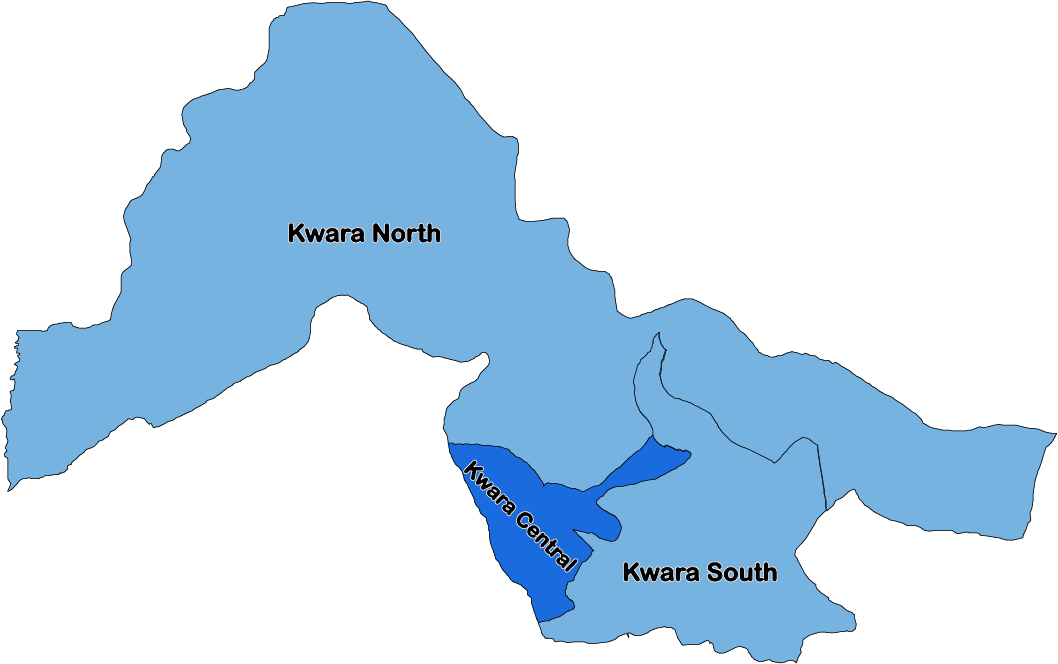
APC incumbent lost renomination APC incumbent running

District	Incumbent		Results	
District	Incumbent	Party	Status	Candidates
Kwara Central	Ibrahim Yahaya Oloriegbe	APC	Incumbent lost renomination New member elected APC hold	▌ ✓ Saliu Mustapha (APC); ▌Bolaji Abdullahi (PDP); ▌Ridwanullah Apaokagi (SDP)
Kwara North	Suleiman Sadiq Umar	APC	Incumbent re-elected	▌ ✓ Suleiman Sadiq Umar (APC); ▌Isa Adamu Bawa (PDP)
Kwara South	Lola Ashiru	APC	Incumbent re-elected	▌ ✓ Lola Ashiru (APC); ▌Rafiu Adebayo Ibrahim (PDP)

== Lagos State ==
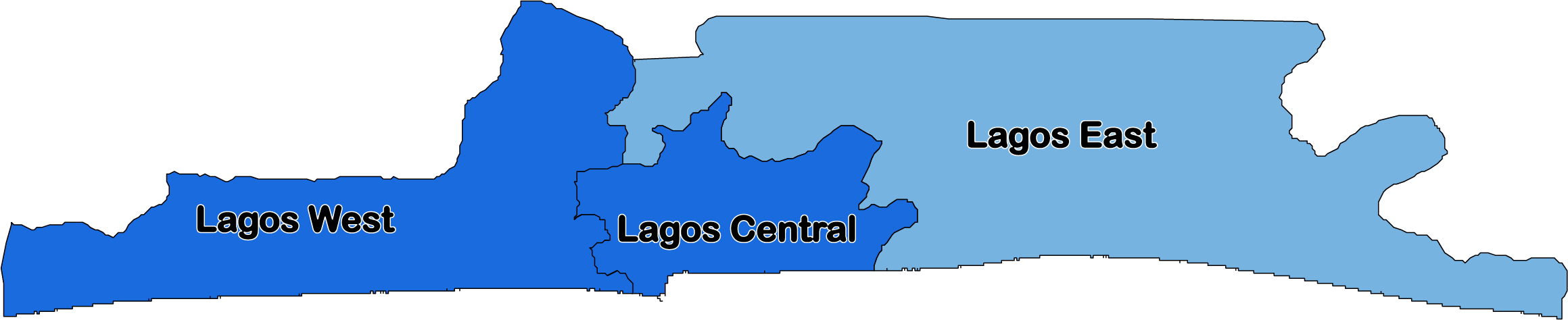
APC incumbent retiring APC incumbent running

District	Incumbent		Results	
District	Incumbent	Party	Status	Candidates
Lagos Central	Oluremi Tinubu	APC	Incumbent retired New member elected APC hold	▌ ✓ Wasiu Eshinlokun Sanni (APC); ▌Wale Gomez (PDP)
Lagos East	Tokunbo Abiru	APC	Incumbent re-elected	▌ ✓ Tokunbo Abiru (APC); ▌Nicholas Akobada (PDP)
Lagos West	Solomon Olamilekan Adeola	APC	Incumbent retired New member elected APC hold	▌ ✓ Oluranti Adebule (APC); ▌Segun Adewale (PDP)

== Nasarawa State ==
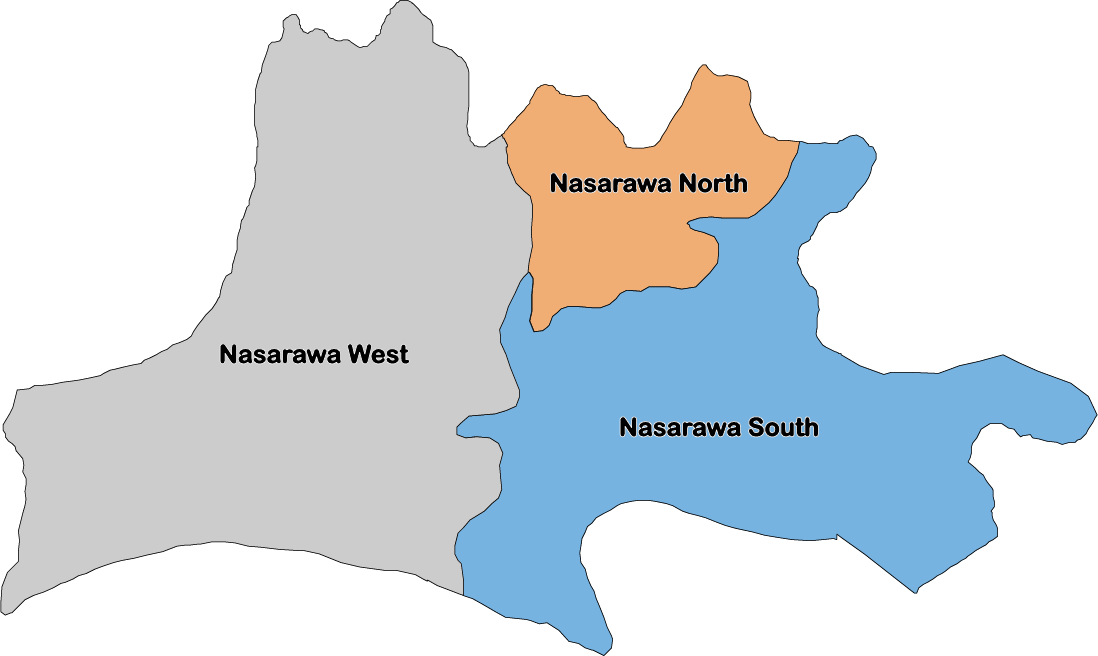
APC incumbent running SDP incumbent running Vacant

District	Incumbent		Results	
District	Incumbent	Party	Status	Candidates
Nasarawa North	Godiya Akwashiki	SDP (Note: This senator was elected as a member of the APC but switched to SDP during their term.)	Incumbent withdrew from primary (Note: Senator defected to new party after withdrawing from or losing their former party's primary.); Incumbent re-elected under nomination of new party	▌Danladi Halilu Envulu'Anza (APC); ▌Nathaniel Obin Aboki (PDP); ▌ ✓ Godiya Akwashiki (SDP)
Nasarawa South	Umaru Tanko Al-Makura	APC	Incumbent lost re-election New member elected PDP gain	▌Umaru Tanko Al-Makura (APC); ▌ ✓ Mohammed Ogoshi Onawo (PDP)
Nasarawa West	Vacant		New member elected SDP gain	▌TBD (APC); ▌Umar Galadima (PDP); ▌ ✓ Ahmed Aliyu Wadada (SDP)

== Niger State ==
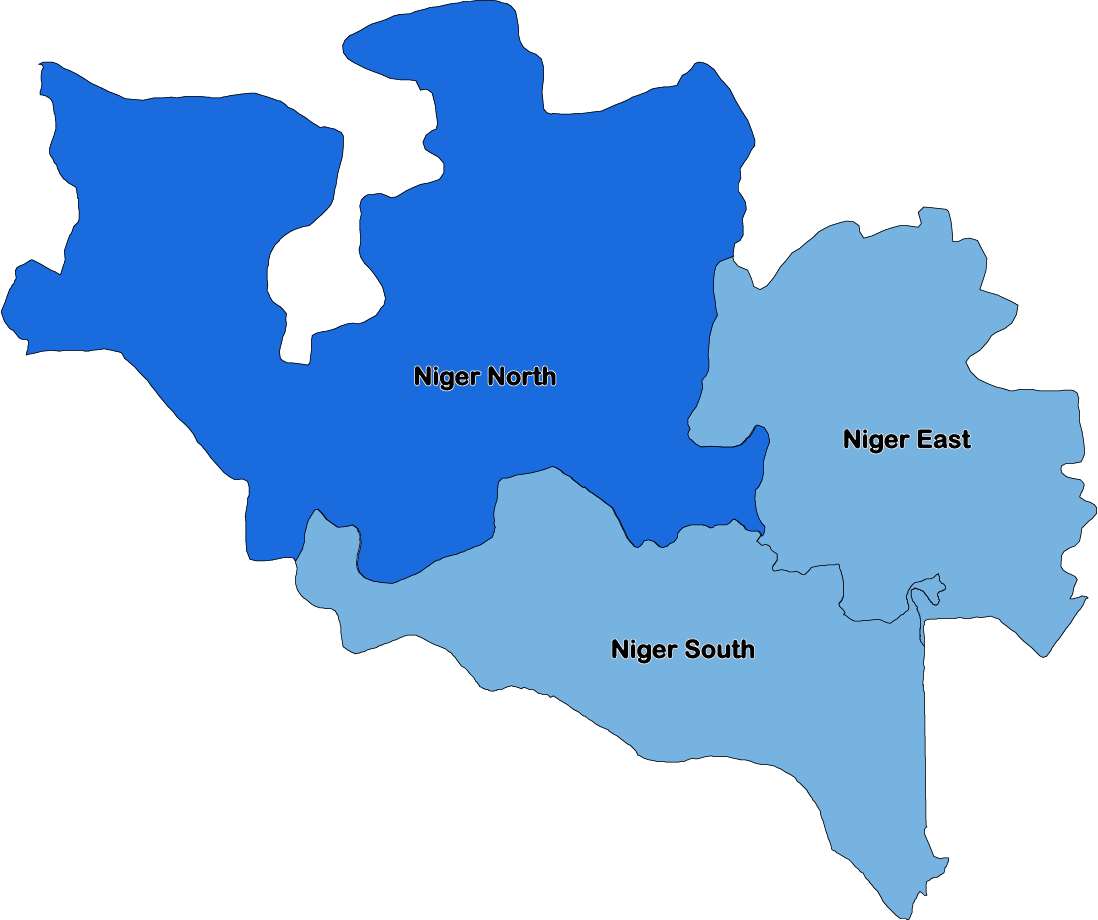
APC incumbent retiring or lost renomination APC incumbent running

District	Incumbent		Results	
District	Incumbent	Party	Status	Candidates
Niger East	Sani Musa	APC	Incumbent re-elected	▌ ✓ Sani Musa (APC); ▌Ibrahim Isiyaku (PDP)
Niger North	Aliyu Sabi Abdullahi	APC	Incumbent lost renomination New member elected APC hold	▌ ✓ Abubakar Sani Bello (APC); ▌Abdullahi Shehu Mohammed (PDP)
Niger South	Muhammad Bima Enagi	APC	Incumbent lost re-election New member elected PDP gain	▌Muhammad Bima Enagi (APC); ▌ ✓ Peter Ndalikali Jiya (PDP)

== Ogun State ==
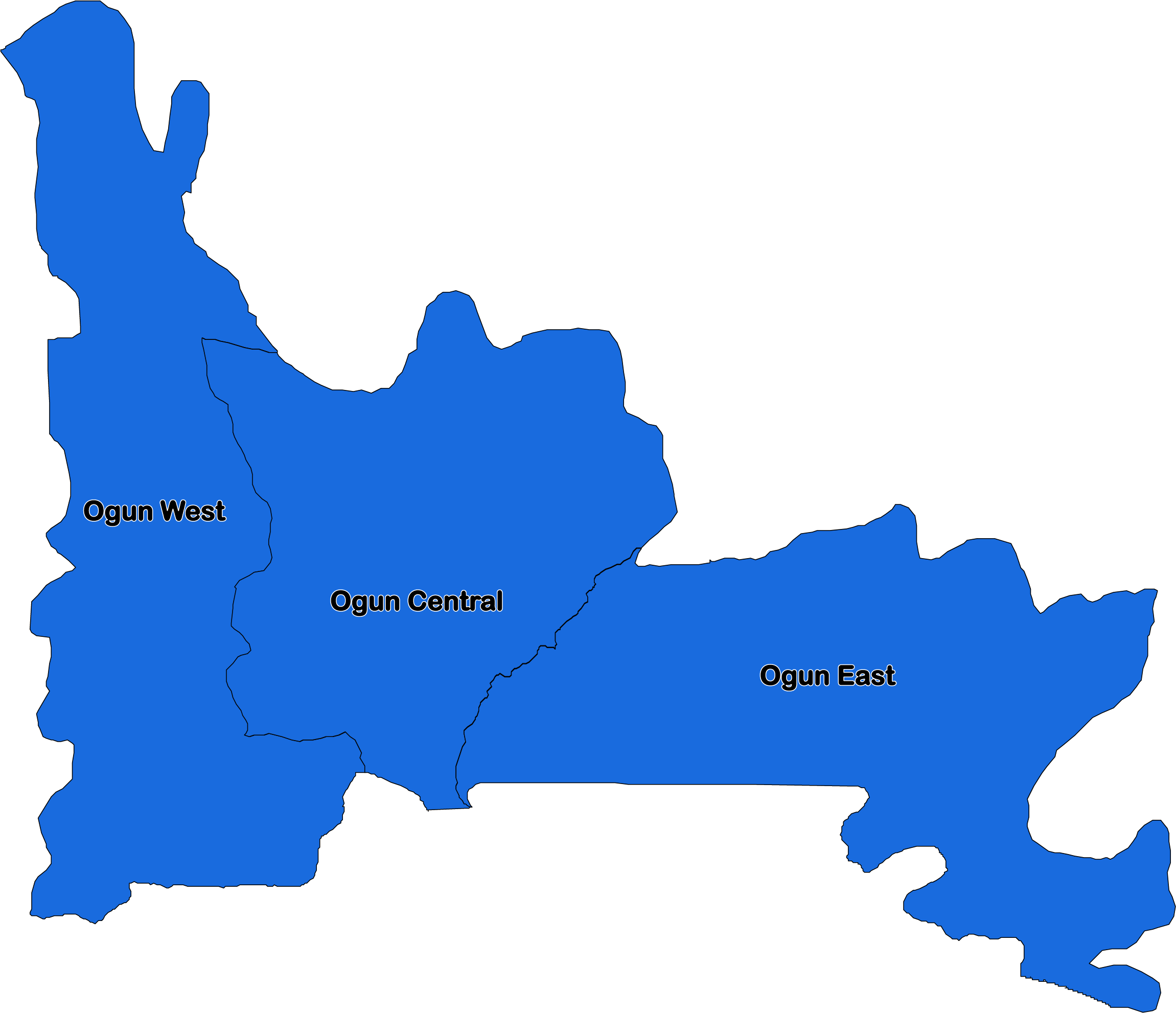
APC incumbent retiring or lost renomination

District	Incumbent		Results	
District	Incumbent	Party	Status	Candidates
Ogun Central	Ibikunle Amosun	APC	Incumbent retired New member elected APC hold	▌ ✓ Shuaibu Salisu (APC); ▌David Olumide Aderinokun (PDP)
Ogun East	Ramoni Olalekan Mustapha	APC	Incumbent withdrew from primary New member elected APC hold	▌ ✓ Gbenga Daniel (APC); ▌Dave Oladapo Salako (PDP)
Ogun West	Tolu Odebiyi	APC	Incumbent lost renomination New member elected APC hold	▌ ✓ Solomon Olamilekan Adeola (APC); ▌Ganiyu Adeleke Dada (PDP)

== Ondo State ==
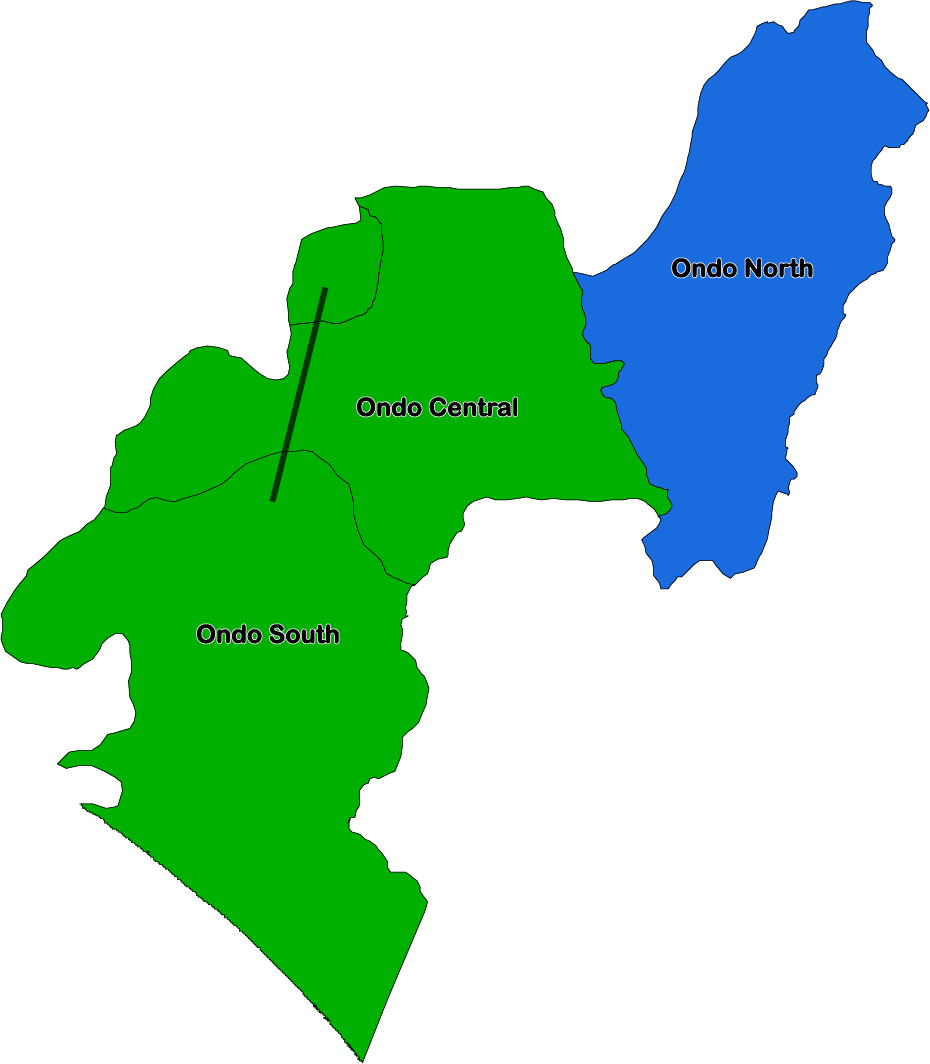
APC incumbent retiring PDP incumbent lost renomination

District	Incumbent		Results	
District	Incumbent	Party	Status	Candidates
Ondo Central	Patrick Ayo Akinyelure	PDP	Incumbent lost renomination New member elected APC gain	▌ ✓ Adeniyi Adegbonmire (APC); ▌Ifedayo Adedipe (PDP)
Ondo North	Robert Ajayi Boroffice	APC	Incumbent retired New member elected APC hold	▌ ✓ Jide Ipinsagba (APC); ▌Adetokunbo Modupe (PDP)
Ondo South	Nicholas Tofowomo	PDP	Incumbent lost renomination New member elected APC gain	▌ ✓ Jimoh Ibrahim (APC); ▌Agboola Ajayi (PDP)

== Osun State ==
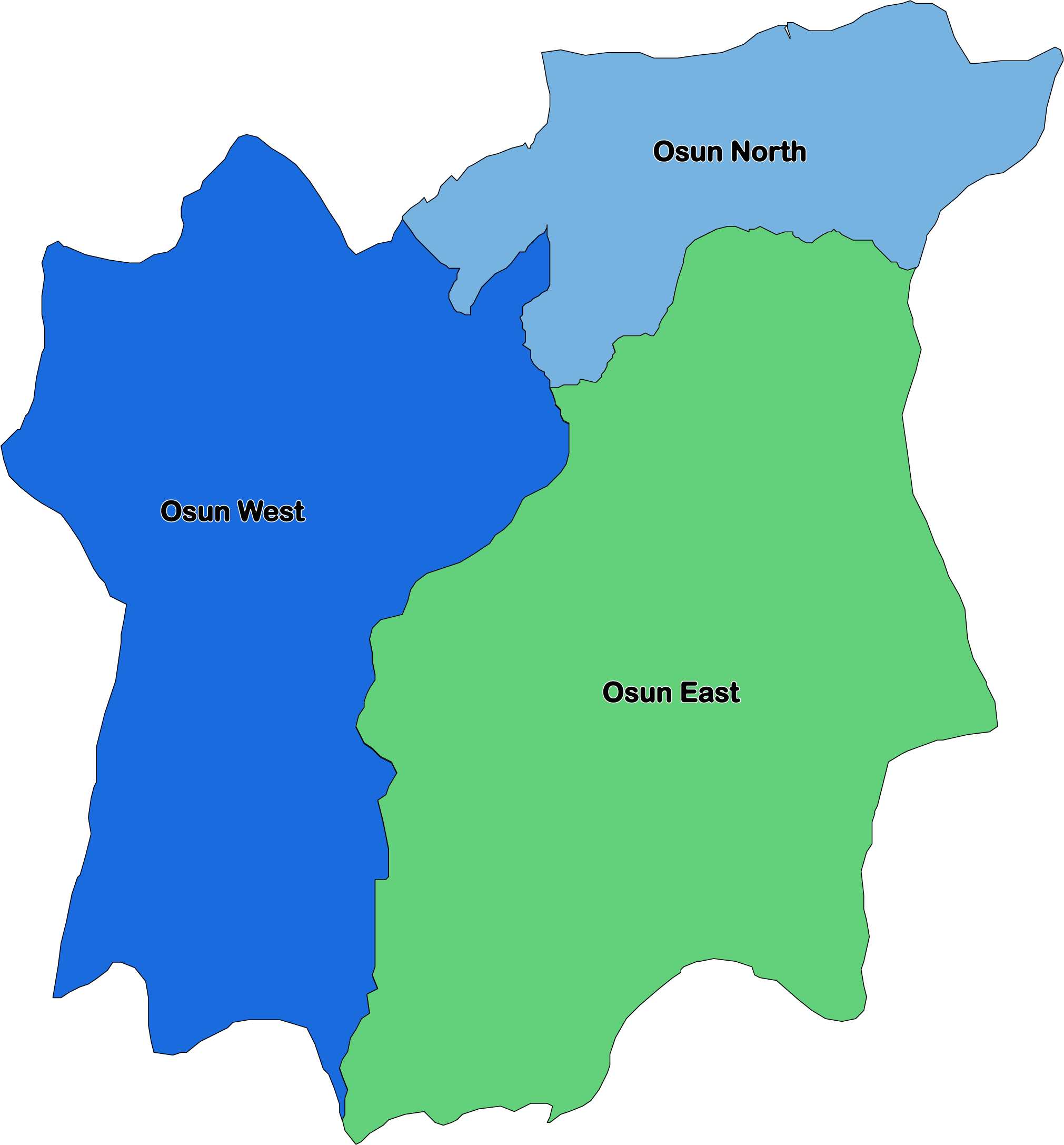
APC incumbent lost renomination APC incumbent running PDP incumbent running

District	Incumbent		Results	
District	Incumbent	Party	Status	Candidates
Osun Central	Ajibola Basiru	APC	Incumbent lost re-election New member elected PDP gain	▌Ajibola Basiru (APC); ▌ ✓ Olubiyi Fadeyi (PDP)
Osun East	Francis Adenigba Fadahunsi	PDP	Incumbent re-elected	▌Ajibola Famurewa (APC); ▌ ✓ Francis Adenigba Fadahunsi (PDP)
Osun West	Adelere Adeyemi Oriolowo	APC	Incumbent lost renomination New member elected PDP gain	▌Raheem Amidu Tadese (APC); ▌ ✓ Lere Oyewumi (PDP)

== Oyo State ==
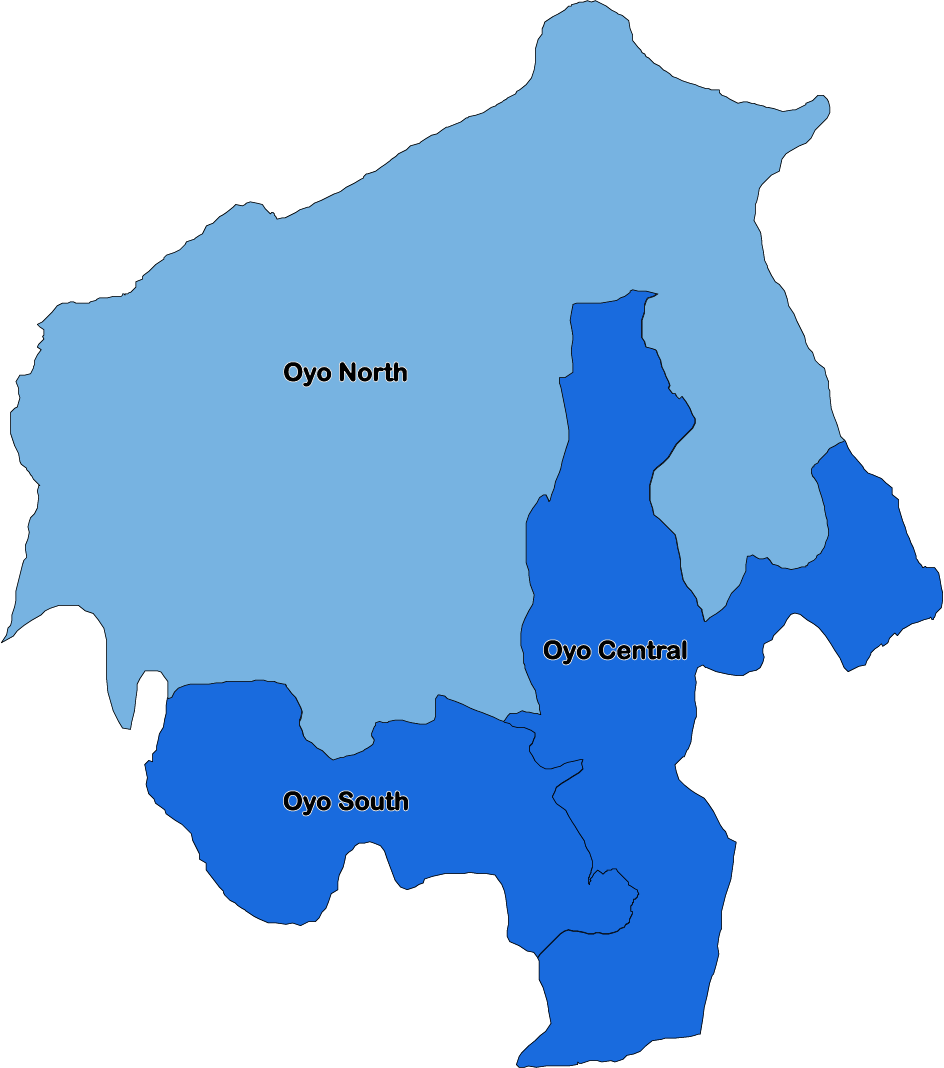
APC incumbent retiring or lost renomination APC incumbent running

District	Incumbent		Results	
District	Incumbent	Party	Status	Candidates
Oyo Central	Teslim Folarin	APC	Incumbent retired New member elected APC hold	▌ ✓ Yunus Akintunde (APC); ▌Bisi Ilaka (PDP)
Oyo North	Abdulfatai Buhari	APC	Incumbent re-elected	▌ ✓ Abdulfatai Buhari (APC); ▌Akinwale Akinwole (PDP)
Oyo South	Mohammed Kola Balogun	APC (Note: This senator was elected as a member of the PDP but switched to the APC during their term.)	Incumbent lost nomination New member elected APC hold	▌ ✓ Sharafadeen Alli (APC); ▌Joseph Olasunkanmi Tegbe (PDP)

== Plateau State ==
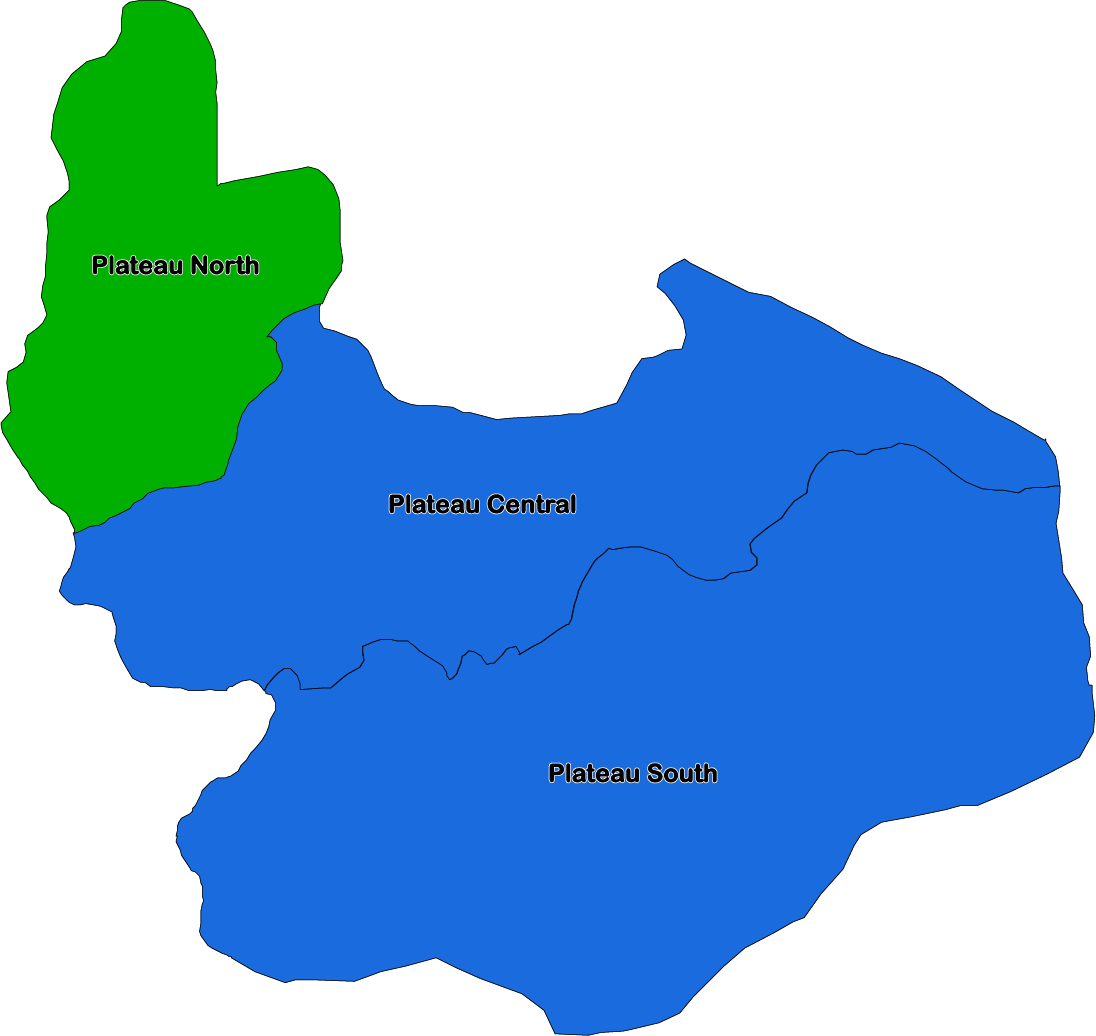
APC incumbent retiring or lost renomination PDP incumbent retiring or lost renomination

District	Incumbent		Results	
District	Incumbent	Party	Status	Candidates
Plateau Central	Hezekiah Ayuba Dimka	APC	Incumbent retired New member elected APC hold	▌ ✓ Diket Plang (APC); ▌G. Y. Gotom (PDP)
Plateau North	Istifanus Gyang	PDP	Incumbent lost renomination New member elected PDP hold	▌Chris Giwa (APC); ▌ ✓ Simon Mwadkwon (PDP)
Plateau South	Nora Daduut	APC	Incumbent withdrew from primary New member elected PDP gain	▌Simon Lalong (APC); ▌ ✓ Napoleon Bali (PDP)

== Rivers State ==
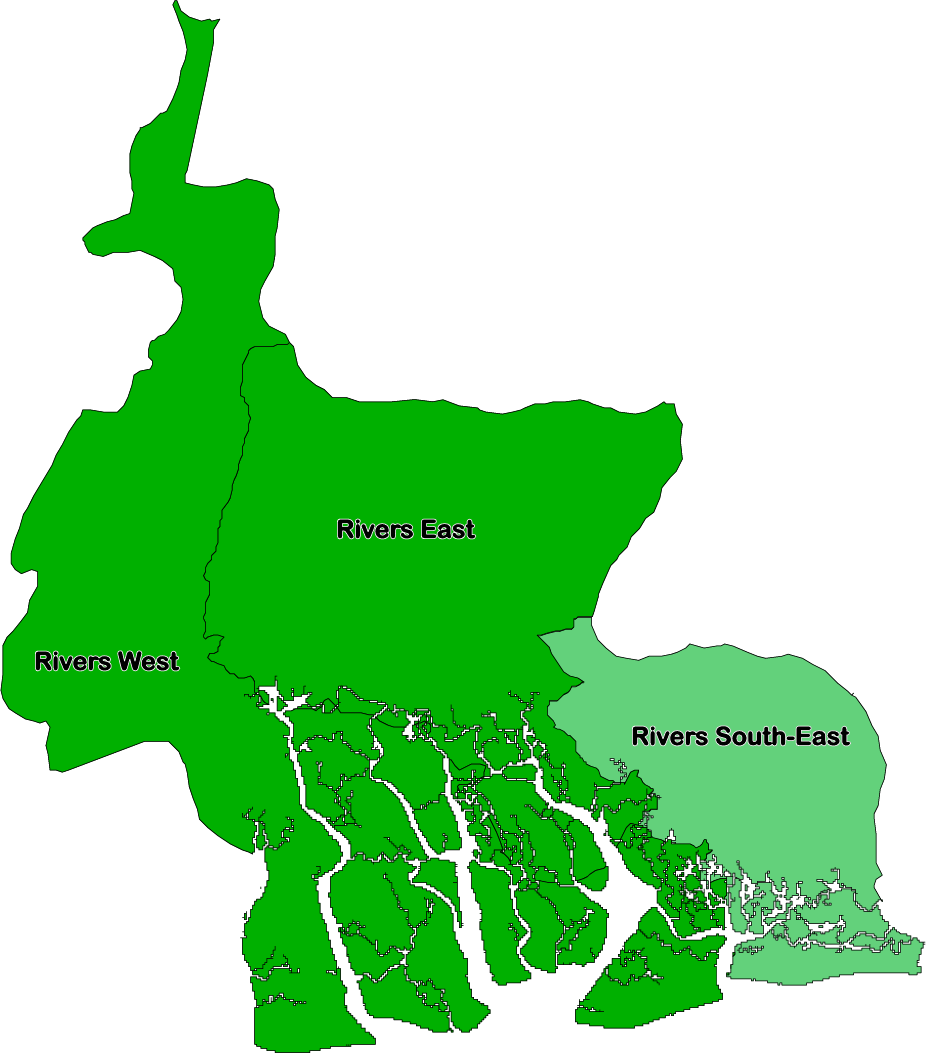
PDP incumbent retiring PDP incumbent running

District	Incumbent		Results	
District	Incumbent	Party	Status	Candidates
Rivers East	George Thompson Sekibo	PDP	Incumbent retired New member elected PDP hold	▌Bisi Nwankwo (APC); ▌ ✓ Allwell Onyeso (PDP)
Rivers South-East	Barry Mpigi	PDP	Incumbent re-elected	▌Oji N. Ngofa (APC); ▌ ✓ Barry Mpigi (PDP)
Rivers West	Betty Apiafi	PDP	Incumbent retired New member elected PDP hold	▌Asita O. Asita (APC); ▌ ✓ Ipalibo Banigo (PDP)

== Sokoto State ==
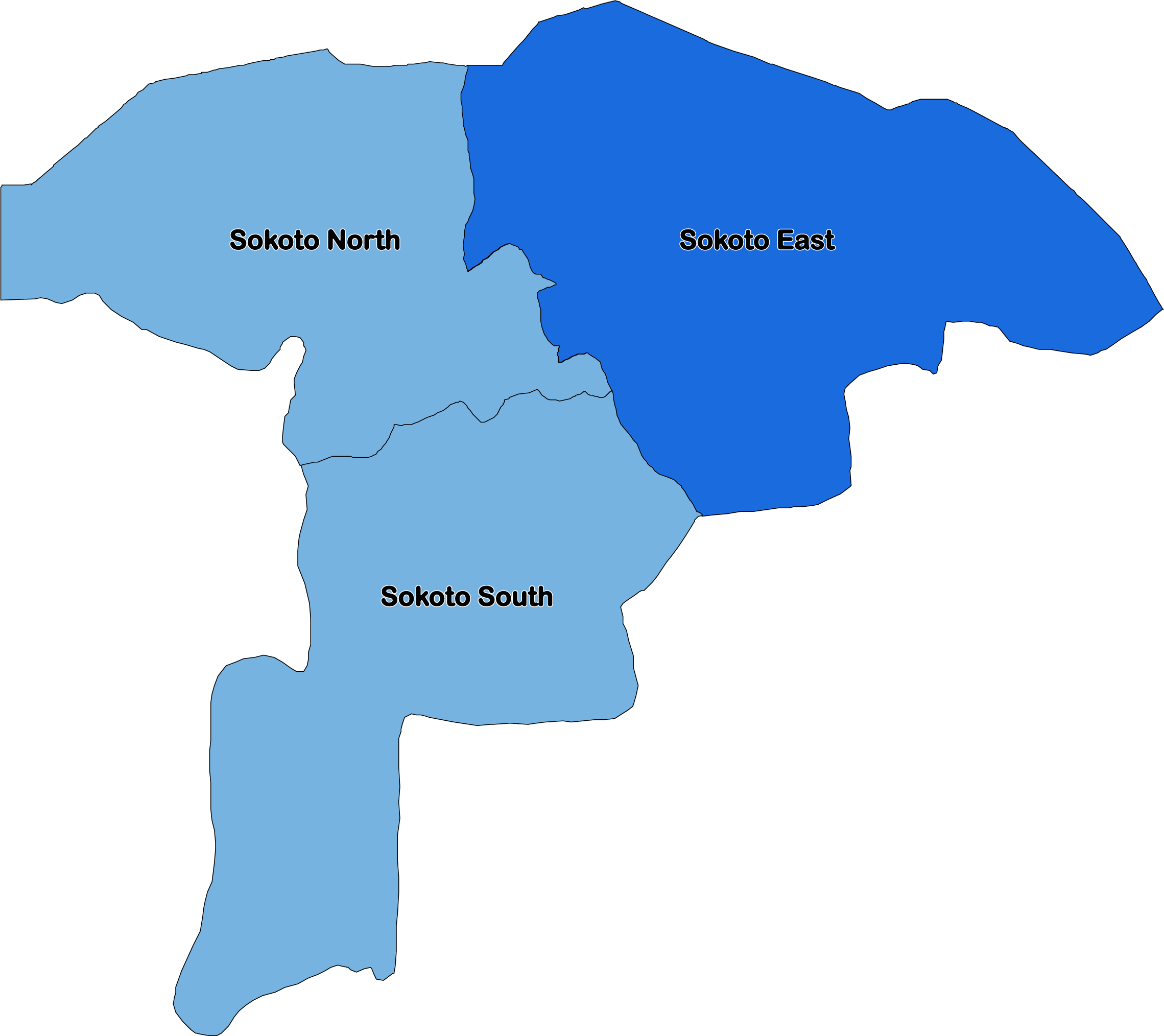
APC incumbent retiring APC incumbent running

District	Incumbent		Results	
District	Incumbent	Party	Status	Candidates
Sokoto East	Abdullahi Ibrahim Gobir	APC	Incumbent retired New member elected APC hold	▌ ✓ Ibrahim Lamido (APC); ▌Shu'aibu Gwanda Gobir (PDP)
Sokoto North	Aliyu Magatakarda Wamakko	APC	Incumbent re-elected	▌ ✓ Aliyu Magatakarda Wamakko (APC); ▌Manir Dan Iya (PDP)
Sokoto South	Ibrahim Abdullahi Danbaba	APC (Note: This senator was elected as a member of the PDP but switched to the APC during their term.)	Incumbent lost re-election New member electedPDP gain	▌Ibrahim Abdullahi Danbaba (APC); ▌ ✓ Aminu Waziri Tambuwal (PDP)

== Taraba State ==
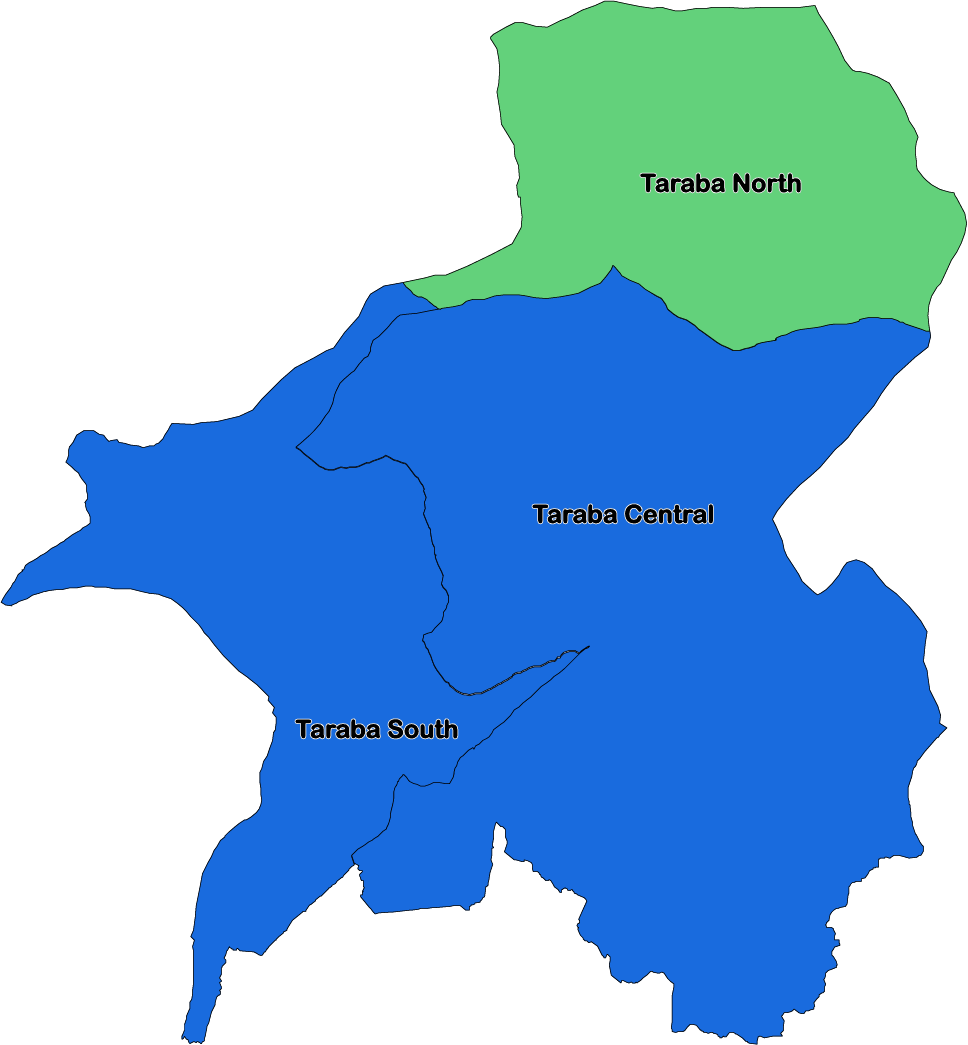
APC incumbent retiring PDP incumbent running

District	Incumbent		Results	
District	Incumbent	Party	Status	Candidates
Taraba Central	Yusuf Abubakar Yusuf	APC	Incumbent retired New member elected PDP gain	▌Bashir Marafa (APC); ▌ ✓ Haruna Manu (PDP)
Taraba North	Shuaibu Isa Lau	PDP	Incumbent re-elected	▌Ali Sani Kona (APC); ▌ ✓ Shuaibu Isa Lau (PDP)
Taraba South	Emmanuel Bwacha	APC (Note: This senator was elected as a member of the PDP but switched to the APC during their term.)	Incumbent retired New member elected APC hold	▌ ✓ David Jimkuta (APC); ▌Darius Dickson Ishaku (PDP)

== Yobe State ==
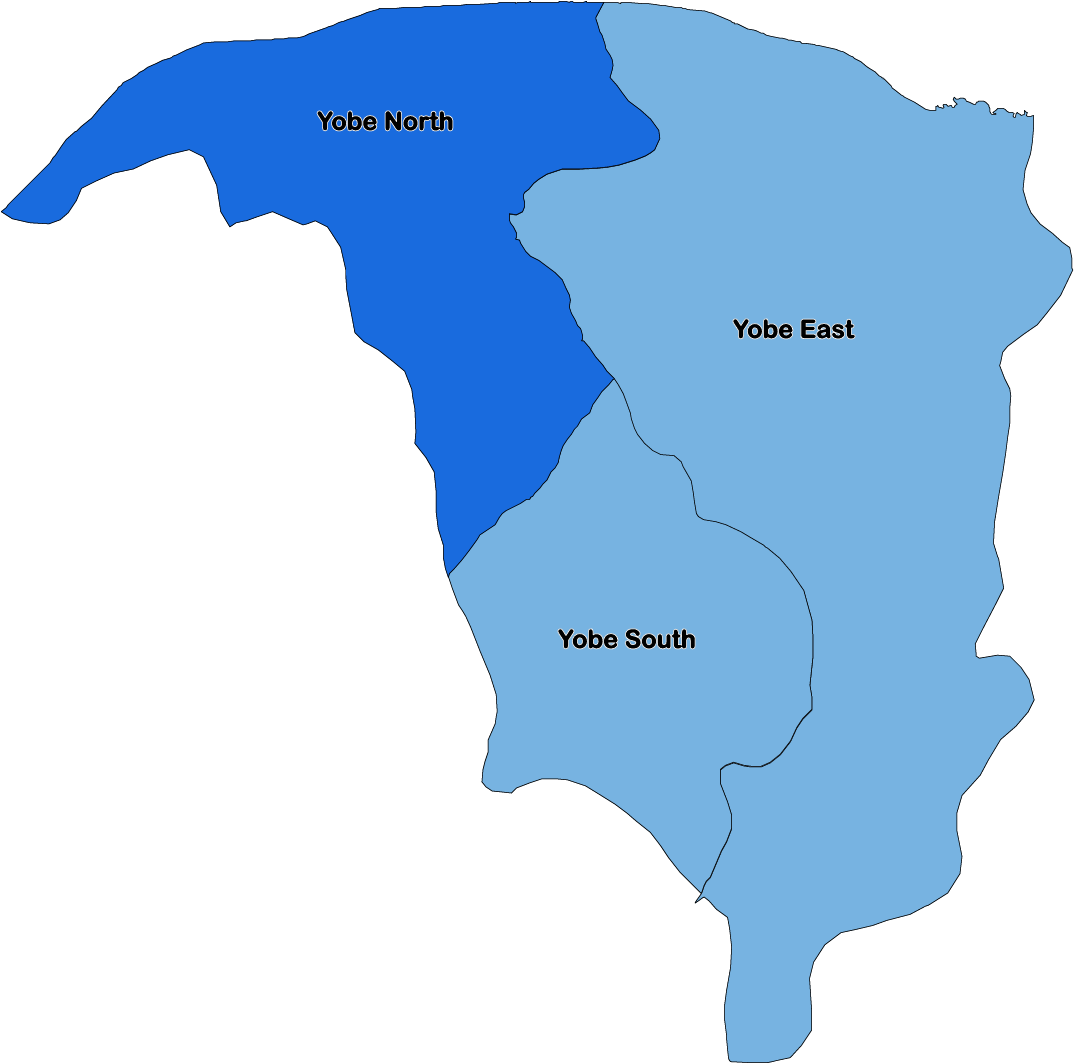
APC incumbent retiring or lost renomination APC incumbent running

District	Incumbent		Results	
District	Incumbent	Party	Status	Candidates
Yobe East	Ibrahim Gaidam	APC	Incumbent re-elected	▌ ✓ Ibrahim Gaidam (APC); ▌Aji Kolomi (PDP)
Yobe North	Ahmad Lawan	APC	Incumbent re-elected	▌ ✓ Ahmad Lawan (APC); ▌Ilu Bello (PDP)
Yobe South	Ibrahim Mohammed Bomai	APC	Incumbent re-elected	▌ ✓ Ibrahim Mohammed Bomai (APC); ▌Halilu Abubakar Mazagane (PDP)

== Zamfara State ==
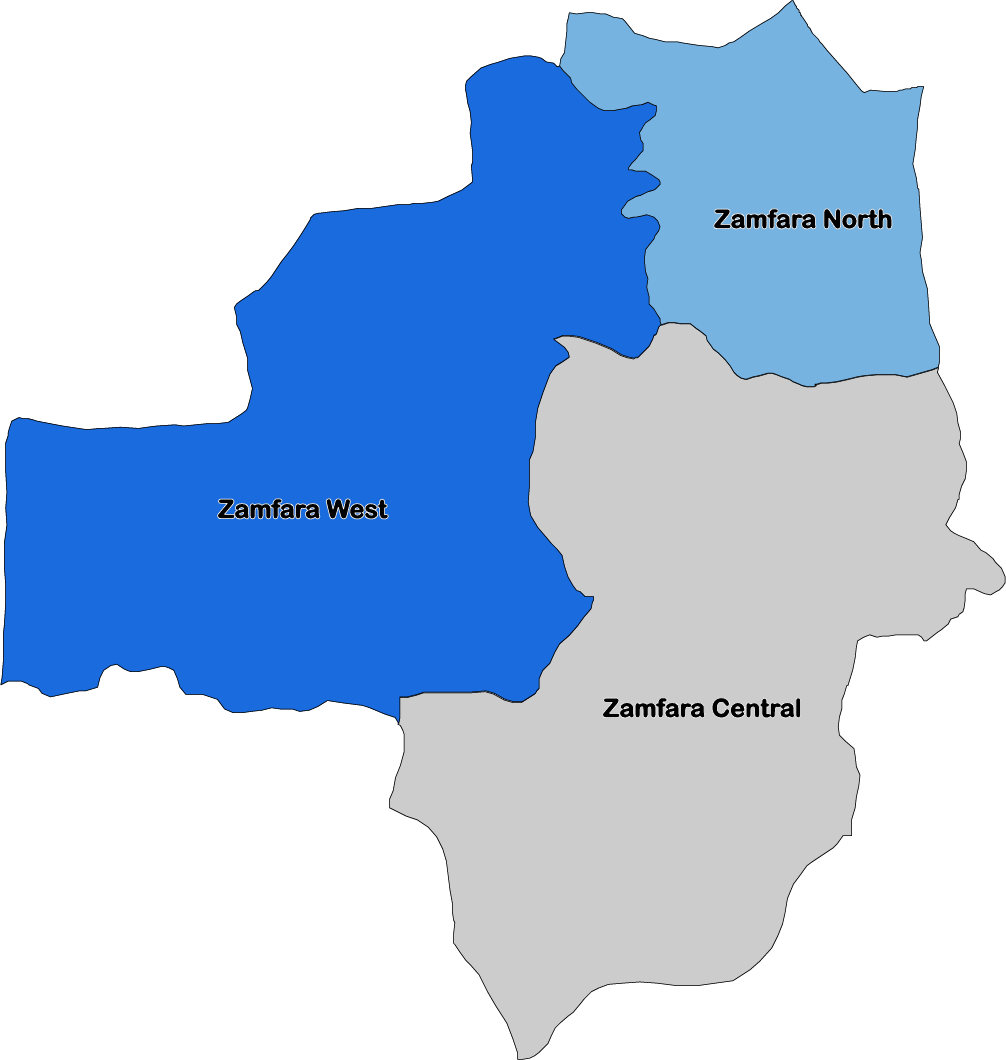
APC incumbent retiring APC incumbent running Vacant

District	Incumbent		Results	
District	Incumbent	Party	Status	Candidates
Zamfara Central	Vacant		New member electedPDP gain	▌Kabir Garba Marafa (APC); ▌ ✓ Ikira Aliyu Bilbis (PDP)
Zamfara North	Sahabi Alhaji Yaú	APC (Note: This senator was elected as a member of the PDP but switched to the APC during their term.)	Incumbent re-elected	▌ ✓ Sahabi Alhaji Yaú (APC); ▌Bala Mande (PDP)
Zamfara West	Lawali Hassan Anka	APC (Note: This senator was elected as a member of the PDP but switched to the APC during their term.)	Incumbent retired New member elected APC hold	▌ ✓ Abdul'aziz Abubakar Yari (APC); ▌Muhammed Bello Sarkin-Fagon (PDP)
