= Bashir (name) =

- Pronunciation: Arabic: [baˈʃiːr]
- Gender: male

Origin
- Origin: Arabic
- Meaning: 'the one who brings good news'

Other names
- Variant forms: Basheer, Beshir, Bachir, Béchir, Beşir
- Related names: Bashar, Abshir, Basheerah, Absheerah

Bashir or Basheer (Arabic: بشير, romanized: Bašīr, lit. 'the one who brings good news'), also gallicized in the form Bachir or Béchir, is a masculine given name and surname of Arabic origin. Notable people with the name include:

== Mononym ==
- Bashir I, Lebanese emir of the Shihab dynasty
- Bashir Shihab II (1767–1850), Lebanese emir who ruled Lebanon
- Bashir III (1775–1860), ruler of the Mount Lebanon Emirate (7th Emir, reigned 1840–1842)

== Given name ==
=== Bachir ===
- Bachir Abdelouahab (1897–1978), Algerian politician and medical doctor
- Bachir Ammoury (born 1983), American-born Lebanese basketball player
- Bachir Hani Abou Assi (born 1948), Lebanese wrestler
- Bachir Attar (born 1964), Moroccan American musician and leader of The Master Musicians of Jajouka led by Bachir Attar.
- Bachir Sid Azara (born 1996), Algerian Greco-Roman wrestler
- Bachir Bensaddek (born 1972), Canadian television director of Algerian Berber descent
- Bachir Boumaaza (born 1980), mostly known by the online pseudonym Athene, a Belgian internet personality and Twitch.tv streamer
- Bachir Chihani (1929–1955), Algerian intendance fighter
- Bachir Douadi (born 1953), Algerian football player
- Bachir Gadiaga (born 1998), Senegalese-Taiwanese basketball player
- Bachir Gemayel or Bashīr al-Jimayyel (1947–1982), Lebanese military commander, politician and president-elect
- Bachir Moustafa Hammoud (1906–1945), a Lebanese philosopher, poet and Shī‘ah religious leader
- Bachir Mahamat (born 1996), Chadian sprinter
- Bachir Mané (born 1997), Senegalese football player
- Bachir Mecheri (born 1964), Algerian football player
- Bachir Messaitfa, Algerian politician
- Bachir Ndiaye (born 1999), Senegalese footballer
- Bachir Qamari (1951–2021), Moroccan literary critic, novelist and playwright
- Bachir Sebaâ (born 1949), Algerian football player
- Bachir Youcef Sehairi (born 1985), Algerian politician
- Bachir Skiredj (1939–2021), Moroccan actor, filmmaker, comedian, and screenwriter
- Bachir Yellès (1921–2022), Algerian painter

=== Basheer ===
- Basheer Ahmed, Indian-American physician, academic, and author
- Basheer Ahmed (footballer), Sri Lankan footballer
- Basheer Segu Dawood (born 1960), Sri Lankan politician
- Basheer Al-Khewani (born 1982), Yemeni track and field sprint athlete
- Basheer Ahmad Masri (1914–1992), Indian Islamic scholar and animal welfare writer
- Basheer Matta, Pakistani politician
- Basheer Mauladad (1931–2014), Kenyan Asian historian
- Basheer Garba Mohammed (born 1966), Nigerian businessman
- Basheer Nafi (born 1952), British-Palestinian historian
- Basheer Al-Qudaimi (born 1984), Yemeni chess player
- Basheer Ahmed Razi (1916–1998), Indian botanist
- Basheer Saeed (born 1981), Emirati footballer
- Basheer Ahmed Sayeed (1900–1984), Indian judge, politician, and educationist
- Basheeru-Deen Walters (born 1986), South African cricketer

=== Bashir ===
- Bashir Abdi (born 1989), Somali-Belgian athlete
- Bashir Abubakar (born 1962), Nigerian politician
- Bashir Adewale Adeniyi, Nigerian civil servant
- Bashir Ahmed, multiple people
- Bashir Alias (born 1966), Malaysian politician
- Bashir Ladan Aliero, Nigerian academic
- Bashir Aushev (1947–2009), Ingush politician
- Bashir al-Azma (1910–1992), Syrian doctor and politician
- Bashir Babajanzadeh (born 1989), Iranian wrestler
- Bashir Babale, Nigerian politician
- Bashir Badr (1935–2026), Indian poet of Urdu
- Bashir Baghlani (1931–2007), Afghan politician
- Bashir Barghouti (1931–2000), Palestinian communist and journalist
- Bashir Saleh Bashir (born 1946), former aide of former Libyan leader Muammar Gaddafi.
- Bashir Ahmad Bezan (born 1966), Afghan politician
- Bashir Bhadarwahi (born 1935), Indian writer, educationist, and poet
- Bashir Bhola Bhala (born 1971), Pakistani wrestler
- Bashir Ahmad Bilour (1943–2012), Pakistani politician
- Bashir Copti (1929–2016), Palestinian–Lebanese teacher, poet, writer, and publisher
- Bashir Dalhatu (born 1949), Nigerian aristocrat, statesman, and lawyer
- Bashir Ahmad Dar (born 1962), Indian politician
- Bashir Eiti (born 1995), Syrian chess player
- Bashir Garba, Nigerian professor of applied chemistry
- Bashir Nur Gedi (died 2007), Somali radio manager
- Bashir Goobe, Somali politician and Army officer
- Bashir Gwandu, Nigerian engineer and technologist
- Bashir Haider (born 1940), Pakistani cricketer
- Bashir Ahmed Halepoto (died 2021), Pakistani politician
- Bashir Hameed (1940–2008), American civil rights activist
- Bashir Al-Hashimi (born 1961), Iraqi-British computer engineering researcher, academic, and higher education leader
- Bashir Saghir Hawadi (born 1941), Libyan major general
- Bashir Hayford, Ghanaian football manager
- Bashir Al Helal (1936–2021), Bangladeshi novelist
- Bashir Hossain (1934–1978), Bangladeshi film editor and director
- Bashir Humphreys (born 2003), English footballer
- Bashir Yusuf Ibrahim (born 1961), Nigerian politician and businessman
- Bashir Isse, Somali banker and Governor of the Central Bank of Somalia
- Bashir Y Jamoh (born 1964), Nigerian technocrat
- Bashir Jehangiri (1937–2020), Pakistani judge
- Bashir Momin Kavathekar (1947–2021), Indian Marathi language poet and writer
- Bashir Ghulam Nabi Kazi (1921–1986), Pakistani judge and solicitor
- Bashir Kazibwe (born 1986), Ugandan journalist, entrepreneur, and politician
- Bashir Khaleghi (born 1961), Iranian politician and pediatrician
- Bashir Khanbhai (1945–2020), British politician
- Bashir Khrayyef (1917–1983), Tunisian writer
- Bashir ibn Amr al-Kindi (died 680), Arab companion of Husayn ibn Ali
- Bashir Levingston (born 1976), Canadian Football League player
- Bashir Maan (1926–2019), Pakistani-Scottish politician, businessman, judge, community worker and writer.
- Bashir Salihi Magashi (born 1949), Nigerian Army major general
- Bashir Magomedov (born 2002), Russian wrestler
- Bashir Makhtal (born 1977), Canadian citizen accused of terrorism
- Bashir Ahmad Mallal (1898–1972), Singaporean legal scholar, writer, and journalist
- Bashir Nashir Al-Marwalah (born 1979), Yemeni Guantanamo detainee
- Bashir Uba Mashema, Nigerian politician
- Bashir Masih, Pakistani politician
- Bashir Mason (born 1984), American college basketball coach
- Bashir Mirza (1941–2000), Pakistani painter and artist
- Bashir Ali Mohammad (born 1947), Pakistani businessman
- Bashir Mufti (born 1969), Algerian novelist and writer
- Bashir Adeniyi Musa (died 2013), Nigerian diplomat
- Bashir Idris Nadabo, Nigerian politician
- Bashir al-Najafi (born 1942), Pakistani Twelver Shia Marja'
- Bashir Niaz (1936–2002), Pakistani film story, dialogue, and screenwriter
- Bashir Noorzai, Afghan drug lord
- Bashir Ojulari (born 1965), Nigerian engineer
- Bashir Ahmad Orchard (1920–2002), English convert to Ahmadiyya Islam
- Bashir Ahmed Qureshi (1959–2012), Sindhi nationalist who served as the leader of Jeay Sindh Qaumi
- Bashir al-Rabiti, Libyan politician
- Bashir Ahmad Rahmati (born 1985), Afghan wrestler
- Bashir Ramathan, Ugandan boxer
- Bashir Rameev (1918–1994), Soviet inventor and scientist
- Bashir Ramzy (born 1979), American long jumper
- Bashir Saad (born 1991), Lebanese basketball player
- Bashir Ahmad Saadat (born 1981), Afghan footballer
- Bashir Saadawi (1884–1957), Libyan politician
- Bashir ibn Sa'd (died 633), Arab companion of the Islamic prophet Muhammad
- Bashir Safaroglu (1925–1969), Azerbaijani Soviet theater and film actor
- Bashir Salahuddin (born 1976), American actor, writer and comedian
- Bashir Saleh (born 1946), Libyan businessman and ambassador
- Bashir Abdel Samad (1966–2023), Egyptian footballer
- Bashir Shah (born 1983), Pakistani-born Danish cricketer
- Bashir Ali Nasser al-Sharari (born 1970), Yemeni terrorist
- Bashir Raghe Shiiraar (born 1965), Somali secular rebel leader and businessman
- Bashir Suleymanli (born 1980), Azerbaijani human rights defender and political prisoner
- Bashir Taraki (born 1980), Afghan martial artist and coach
- Bashir A. Tahir, Pakistani banker and business executive
- Bashir Tofa (1947–2022), Nigerian politician
- Bashir Aliyu Umar (born 1961), Nigerian Islamic cleric
- Bashir Varaev (born 1964), Chechen judoka
- Bashir Ahmad Shah Veeri, Indian politician
- Bashir Yamini (born 1977), American football player
- Bashir Yuguda, Nigerian diplomat and politician
- Haji Bashir Ismail Yusuf (1912–1984), Somali politician
- Bashir Yussuf (1905–1945), Somali religious leader
- Bashir Zaib, Pakistani Baloch militant
- Bashir Hussain Zaidi (1898–1992), Indian politician
- Bashir Zubairu (born 1968), Nigerian politician

=== Bechir ===
- Bechir Seid Djimet (born 1994), Chadian footballer
- Bechir Guellouz (born 1946), Tunisian diplomat
- Bechir Hadidane (born 1984), Tunisian basketball player
- Bechir Kchouk (1924–1983), Tunisian chess player
- Bechir Kiiari (born 1960), Tunisian judoka
- Bechir Mardassi (1929–??), Tunisian cyclist
- Bechir Mogaadi (born 1975), Tunisian football player
- Bechir Sahbani (born 1972), Tunisian footballer
- Bechir Ben Saïd (born 1992), Tunisian professional footballer
- Bechir Tekkari (born 1952), Tunisian politician

=== Béchir ===
- Béchir Bouazzat (1908–1944), French modern pentathlete of Tunisian descent
- Béchir Sfar (1856–1917), Tunisian nationalist campaigner and politician
- Béchir Ben Slama (1931–2023), Tunisian writer and politician
- Béchir Ben Yahmed (1928–2021), Tunisian-French journalist

== Middle name ==
- Aminu Bashir Wali (born 1941), Nigerian politician and Minister of Foreign Affairs
- Kausar Bashir Ahmed (1939–2006), Pakistani architect, town-planner and educationist
- Khadra Bashir Ali (died 2021), Somali politician
- Mirza Bashir Ahmad (1893–1963), an Ahmadiyya scholar and writer
- Mohammad Al Bachir Gadiaga (born 1998) Senegalese-Taiwanese basketball player
- Nadim Bachir Gemayel (born 1982), Lebanese politician and member of Parliament.
- Souleymane Bachir Diagne (born 1955), Senegalese philosopher

== Surname ==
=== Bachir ===
- Jamil Bachir or Bashir (1920–1977), Iraqi Assyrian musician and expert oud player
- Oubi Buchraya Bachir (born 1970), Sahrawi ambassador
- Salah Bachir (born 1955), Canadian patron of the arts, entrepreneur, philanthropist, magazine publisher of Lebanese descent
- Yamina Bachir (1954–2022), Algerian film director and screenwriter

=== Bashir ===
- Aamir Bashir (born 1970), Indian actor and film director
- Abdul Bashir, Afghan murderer
- Abdul Malik Abdul Bashir (born 1968), Singaporean association football referee
- Abu Bakar Bashir (born 1938), Indonesian Muslim cleric and leader of the Indonesian Mujahedeen Council
- Ahmad Bashir (1923–2004), Pakistani writer, journalist, intellectual and film director
- Ahmed Bashir (born 1995), Pakistani cricketer
- Ahmed Mohamed El-Bashir (born 1949), Sudanese football player
- Neelam Bashir (born 1950), Pakistani novelist and poet
- Ala Bashir (born 1939), Iraqi painter, sculptor, plastic surgeon and former medical counselor to Saddam Hussein
- Amjad Bashir (born 1952), UK politician
- Asabe Vilita Bashir (born 1965), Nigerian politician
- Atif Bashir (born 1985), Pakistani German football player
- Dara Bashir (born 1960), Pakistani cricketer
- Farshad Bashir (born 1988), Dutch tax adviser and former politician of Afghan descent
- Halima Bashir, Sudanese human rights activist
- Hassan Bashir (born 1987), Pakistani football player
- Javed Bashir (born 1973), Pakistani playback singer
- Jonis Bashir (born 1960), Somali-Italian actor and musician
- Marie Bashir (1930–2026), Australian doctor and administrator, Governor of New South Wales
- Martin Bashir (born 1963), British journalist
- Mowaia Bashir (born 1986), Sudanese football player
- Muhammad Bashir (disambiguation), several people
- Munir Bashir (1930–1997), Iraqi oud player
- Nas Bashir (born 1969), English football player
- Omar Bashir (musician) (born 1970), Iraqi-Hungarian musician and oud player, son of Munir Bashir and nephew of Jamil Bashir
- Omar al-Bashir (born 1944), President of Sudan and Sudanese army field marshal
- Palwasha Bashir (born 1987), Pakistani badminton player
- Ruzwana Bashir (born 1983), British businesswoman & activist
- Salman Bashir (born 1952), Pakistani diplomat
- Shahzad Bashir (cricketer), Pakistani cricketer
- Shahid Bashir, Pakistan Army engineer and aviator facing court martial
- Shoaib Bashir (born 2003), English cricketer
- Tahseen Bashir (1925–2002), Egyptian diplomat
- Yousef Bashir (born 1989), Palestinian-American author and peace activist

=== Basheer ===
- David Basheer (born 1966), Australian sports commentator
- Max Basheer (1927–2025), former administrator with the South Australian National Football League
- Thalekunnil Basheer (1945–2022), politician from Kerala state, India
- Vaikom Muhammad Basheer (1908–1994), Indian writer

=== Bechir ===
- Azouz Bechir (born 1935), Tunisian boxer
- Mohamed Bechir-Sow (1907–1976), Chadian politician
- Mohamed Salem Ould Béchir (born 1962), Mauritanian politician and Prime Minister
- Sayed Ali Bechir (born 1982), Qatari football player of Mauritanian descent

=== Béchir ===
- Gabriel Béchir (1927–2001), French set decorator

=== Others ===
- Bichir family, a Mexican acting family of Lebanese descent

== Fictional characters ==
- The title character of Bashir Lazhar, a one-character play by Évelyne de la Chenelière
- Julian Bashir, the Chief Medical Officer in the television series Star Trek: Deep Space Nine
- Ali Bashir, a flying carpet salesman mentioned in Harry Potter and the Goblet of Fire
