= Bashiru =

Bashiru is a given name and surname used among African Muslims, cognate with the Arabic Bashir, which means “the one who brings good news“. Notable people with the name include:

== Given name ==
- Bashiru Ally, Tanzanian academic, diplomat and politician
- Bashiru Gambo (born 1978), Ghanaian footballer
- Bashiru Kwaw-Swanzy (1921–1997), Ghanaian politician
- Bashiru Ademola Raji, Nigerian soil scientist

== Surname ==
- Abdul Bashiru (born 1992), Ghanaian footballer
- Osman Bashiru (born 1989), Ghanaian footballer
- Umar Bashiru (born 1997), Ghanaian footballer
