= Adeniyi =

- Gender: Male
- Language: Yoruba

Origin
- Origin: Nigerian
- Region of origin: South West (Nigeria)

Adéníyì is a name and surname of Yoruba origin, meaning "the crown or royalty has value". Notable bearers include:

- Aminat Adeniyi (born 1993), Nigerian sport wrestler
- Bashir Adeniyi Musa, Nigerian diplomat
- James Adeniyi (born 1992), Nigerian footballer
- Mathieu Adeniyi (born 1987), Beninese footballer
- Olasunkanmi Adeniyi (born 1997), American football player
- Olusegun Adeniyi (born 1965), Nigerian journalist
- Peter Adeniyi, Nigerian academic
- Solomon Adeniyi Babalola (1929–2021), Nigerian Baptist missionary, veteran pastor, theologian and educator
