= Sport in Afghanistan =

Sport in Afghanistan is managed by the General Directorate of Olympics, Physical Education and Sports, currently headed by Ahmadullah Wasiq. Currently, cricket and association football (soccer) are the most popular sports in Afghanistan. The Afghan Sports Federation has promoted many types of sports, including basketball, bodybuilding, boxing, bowling, cricket, football, golf, mountaineering, paragliding, skating, skiing, snooker, taekwondo, track and field, volleyball, and weightlifting. The traditional sport of Afghanistan has been Buzkashi, which is now occasionally seen in the northern parts of the country.

The Afghanistan national cricket team's win over Namibia in Krugersdorp earned them official One Day International status in April 2009. The Afghanistan Cricket Board is Afghanistan's representative at the International Cricket Council and was an associate member of ICC from June 2013 to 2017. It is also a member of the Asian Cricket Council. Afghanistan became a full member of the International Cricket Council on 22 June 2017, entitling the national team to participate in official Test matches.

== Basketball ==
Basketball was first played in Afghanistan in 1936. In 1966, the Afghanistan National Olympic Committee (ANOC) founded the Afghanistan national basketball team after receiving challenges from India and Pakistan.

== Bodybuilding ==
Bodybuilding is widely enjoyed in Afghanistan, and the country is a member of the International Federation of BodyBuilding and Fitness (IFBB). An Afghan by the name of Ali Reza Asahi won a gold medal in the 2023 World Bodybuilding Championships, which was held in Seoul, South Korea. Another named Mohammad Ayoub Azami won a silver medal in the same competition. Ahmad Yasin Salik Qaderi ("Mr. Muscles") became the overall winner of the 2017 WBPF World Championship, which was held in Ulaanbaatar, Mongolia.

== Cricket ==
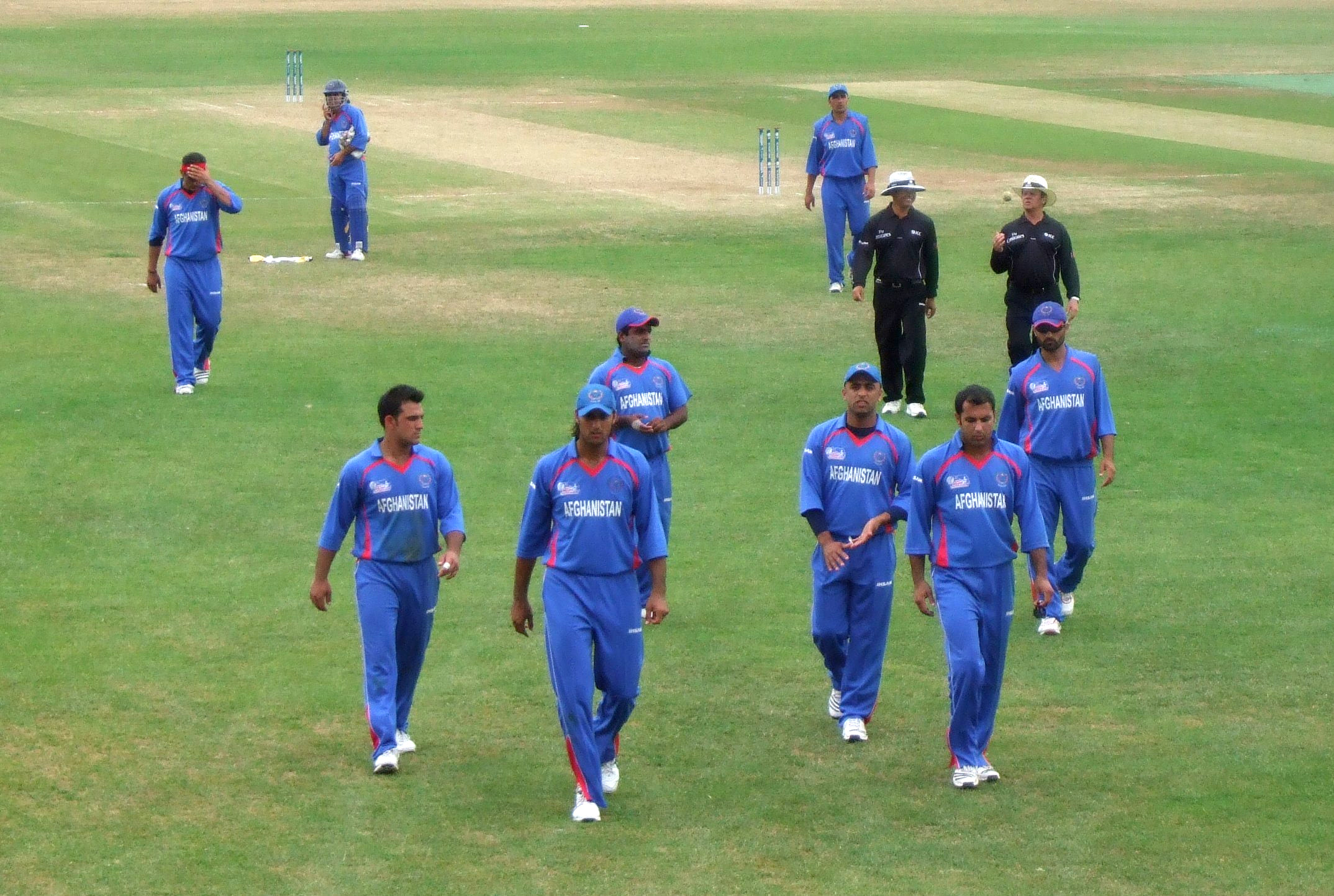
The Afghanistan national cricket team at the 2010 ICC WCL Division One in Rotterdam, Netherlands.

Cricket is one of the most popular sports in Afghanistan. The Afghanistan national cricket team's win over Namibia in Krugersdorp earned them official One Day International status in April 2009. The Afghanistan Cricket Board is Afghanistan's representative at the International Cricket Council and was an associate member of ICC from June 2013 to 2017. It is also a member of the Asian Cricket Council. Afghanistan became a full member of the International Cricket Council on 22 June 2017, entitling the national team to participate in official Test matches. There are 320 cricket clubs and 6 turf wickets in Afghanistan.

The Afghanistan national cricket team have qualified for the last 3 Cricket World Cup tournaments. The last being in 2023. On 28 December 2019, Rashid Khan was named the ICC Men's T20I Cricketer of the Decade and in the ICC Men's T20I Team of the Decade.

In July 2023, a group of Afghan women cricketers in exile formally petitioned the ICC to establish a refugee-based national team, enabling them to play internationally despite being barred at home.

== Football ==
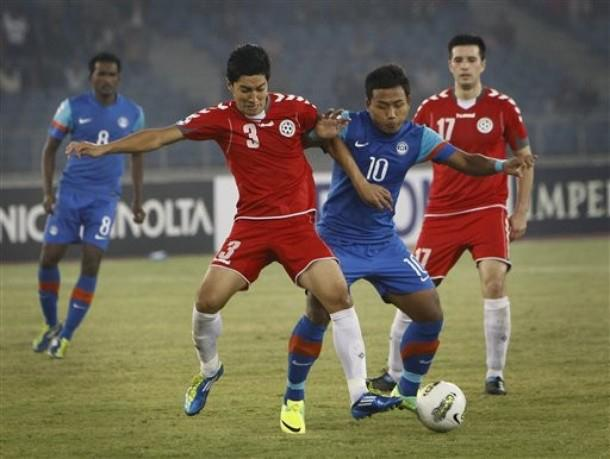
The Afghanistan national football team (in red strip) playing against India's team (in blue) during the 2011 SAFF Championship.

Football is the most popular sport in Afghanistan. It is played in almost every province. The Afghanistan national football team was formed in 1922, joining FIFA in 1948 and the Asian Football Confederation (AFC) in 1954. Afghanistan's only appearance and first FIFA international match was at the Olympic Games football tournament in the 1948 Summer Olympic Games when they played Luxembourg on 26 July 1948 and lost 6–0. Although it did not play in any international games from 1984 to 2003 due to internal conflicts, it is striving to improve its world ranking. The national stadium, which was built during the reign of King Amanullah Khan, has been used for football matches between teams from different provinces of the country as well as neighboring countries. In the national level, football matches are played between provinces or regions.

The country's first international trophy was achieved in the 2013 edition of the SAFF Championship.

== Mixed martial arts ==
Afghans have taken a recent interest in mixed martial arts (MMA). There are several gyms in Afghanistan which promote the sport and have fighters. Siyar Bahadurzada is an Afghan MMA fighter who competes in the Ultimate Fighting Championship. He was known for holding and wearing the Afghan flag around himself before and after his professional fights.

Javid Basharat and Farid Basharat became the first brother tandem to compete in the same division in the UFC. Other popular Afghan MMA fighters include Baz Mohammad and Mubariz.

== Taekwondo ==
The sport of taekwondo has thrived in Afghanistan in the last two decades. Some of the Afghan taekwondo practitioners include Bashir Taraki, Farzad Mansouri, Hussain Sadiqi, Mohsen Rezaee, Rohullah Nikpai, and Zakia Khudadadi.

Nikpai's medal tally summary in the Olympics:

- Bronze in 2008 Olympics
- Bronze in 2012 Olympics

== Other sports ==
Other sports in which Afghans participate include boxing, bowling, buzkashi, futsal, judo, kickboxing, mountaineering, paragliding, rugby, sandrailling, skating, skiing, swimming, team handball, track and field, volleyball, weightlifting, and a number of others. Saleh Mohammad is a professional Afghan snooker player, who previously represented Pakistan in international competitions but is now representing Afghanistan.

Afghanistan also became a member of the Federation of International Bandy in 2012.

In 2015 Afghanistan held its first marathon; among those who ran the entire marathon was one woman, Zainab, age 25, who thus became the first Afghan woman to run in a marathon within her own country.

== Stadiums and gymnasiums ==
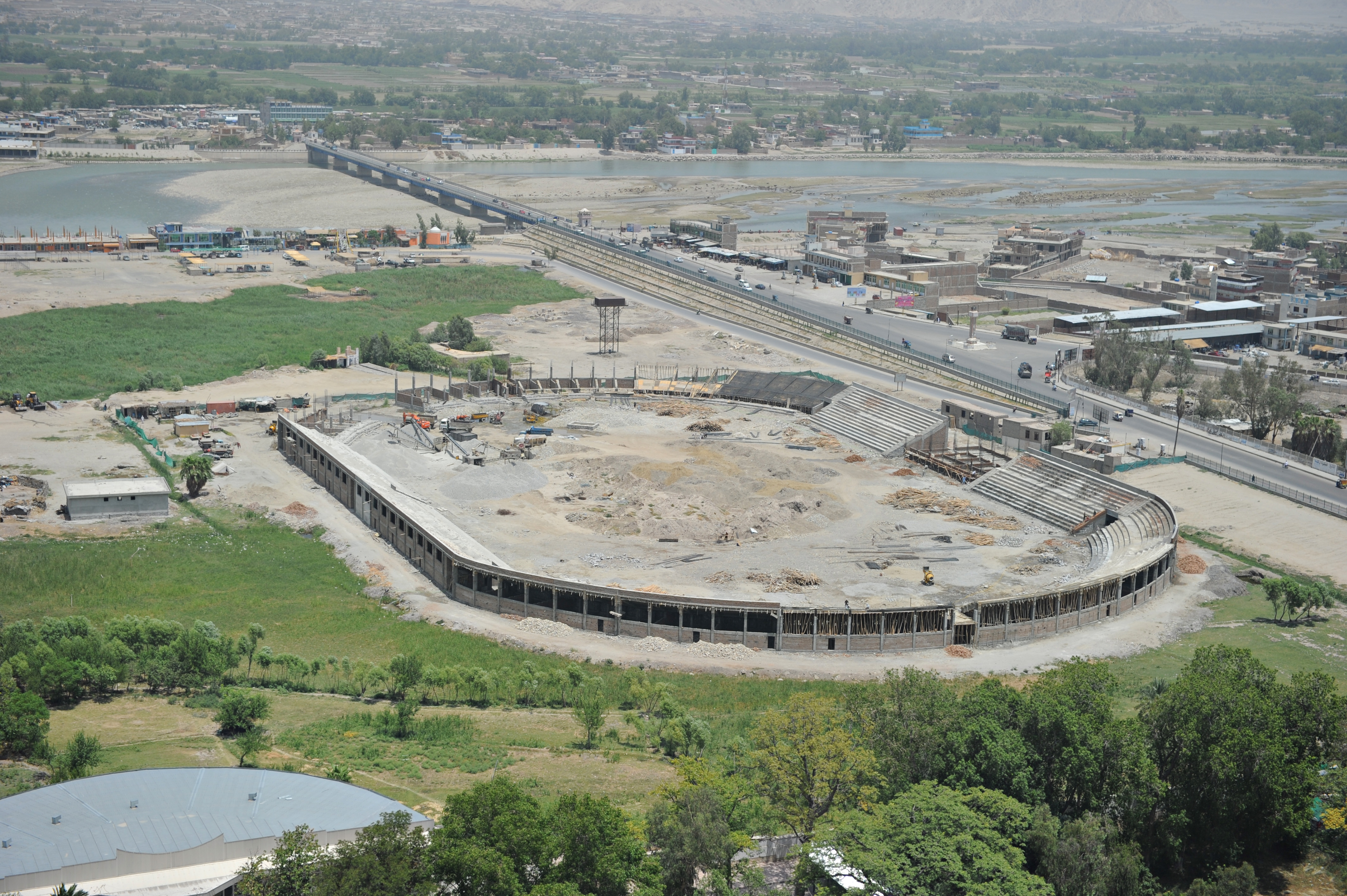
The Sherzai Cricket Stadium in Jalalabad during its construction in 2011.

There are small sized football stadiums in most major cities of Afghanistan, which were built before the 1970s and they lack modern seatings. They will only improve once more if people turn to sport and the nation's economy picks up, including the security situation and proper investors are found. The then-President of the Afghanistan Cricket Board, Omar Zakhilwal, announced in 2010 that the government was planning to construct standard cricket grounds in all 34 provinces in the next two years.

The following are some of the major stadiums in Afghanistan:

- Ghazi Amanullah International Cricket Stadium in Nangarhar Province
- Ghazi Stadium in Kabul
- Kabul National Cricket Stadium in Kabul
- Kandahar International Cricket Stadium in Kandahar
- Kandahar Football Stadium
- Laghman Cricket Stadium in Laghman Province
- Sherzai Cricket Stadium in Jalalabad

By capacity:

#	Name	Location	Capacity	Sport	Image
1	Ghazi Stadium	Kabul	25,000	Association football	
2	Ahmad Shahi Stadium	Kandahar	20,000	Association football	
3	Ghazi Amanullah International Cricket Stadium	Jalalabad	14,000	Cricket	
4	Kandahar International Cricket Stadium	Kandahar	14,000	Cricket	
5	Khost Cricket Stadium	Khost	6,000	Cricket	

== See also ==
- Lists of stadiums
