= Bashir Ahmed =

Bashir Ahmed or Bashir Ahmad may refer to:

== People ==
- Bashir Ahmad (athlete) (born 1967), Pakistani Olympic sprinter
- Bashir Ahmad (camel driver) (1913–1992), Pakistani camel cart driver
- Bashir Ahmad (Guantanamo detainee 1005) (born 1975), Pakistan-born Guantanamo detainee
- Bashir Ahmad (mixed martial artist) (born 1982), Pakistani-American mixed martial artist
- Bashir Ahmad (Scottish politician) (1940–2009), Karachi-born Member of the Scottish Parliament
- Bashir Ahmad (singer) (1939–2014), Bangladeshi singer
- Bashir Ahmed (field hockey, born 1934), Pakistani field hockey player
- Bashir Ahmed (field hockey, born 1941), Bangladeshi field hockey player
- Bashir Ahmed (Masturi MLA), Indian politician
- Bashir Ahmed (Member of Parliament) (1926–1978), Indian lawyer and politician
- Bashir Ahmed (miniaturist) (born 1954), Pakistani painter
- Basir Ahamad, Nepalese cricketer
- Mirza Bashir Ahmad (1893–1963), Indian religious scholar and writer

== See also ==
- Ahmad Bashir (1923–2004), Pakistani writer, journalist, intellectual and film director
