= Wasatch Academy =

Boarding school in Mount Pleasant, Utah

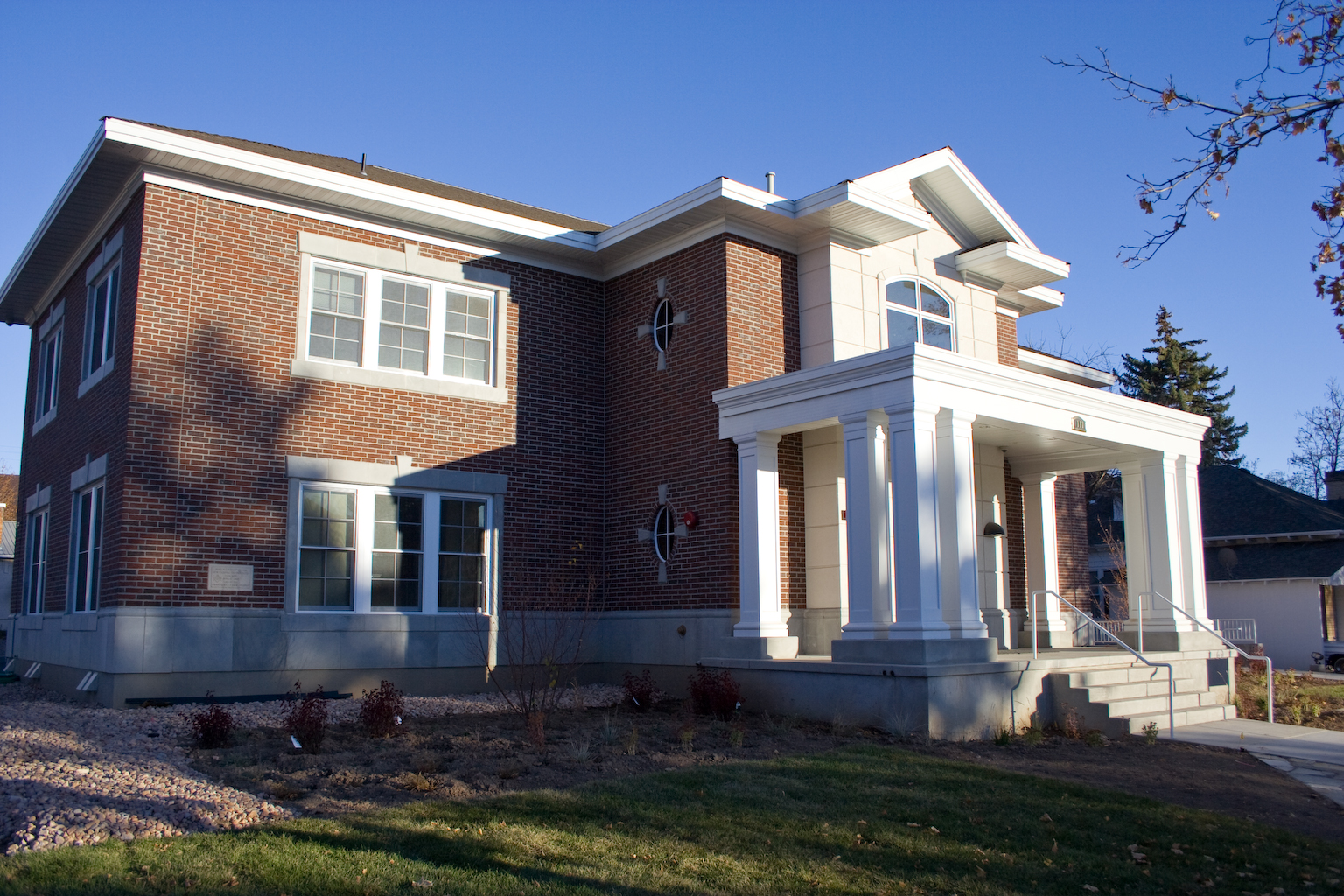
- Anne N. Coltharp Center for Evolving Technologies

Location
- 120 South 100 West; Mount Pleasant, Utah; United States; 39°32′40″N 111°27′30″W

Information
- Type: Independent, coeducational, boarding school
- Established: April 19, 1875; 151 years ago
- Founder: Duncan McMillan
- Head of school: Anne-Evan Williams
- Grades: 8–12, postgraduate
- Colors: Black and orange
- Mascot: Tiger
- Website: www.wasatchacademy.org
- Wasatch Academy
- U.S. National Register of Historic Places
- U.S. Historic district
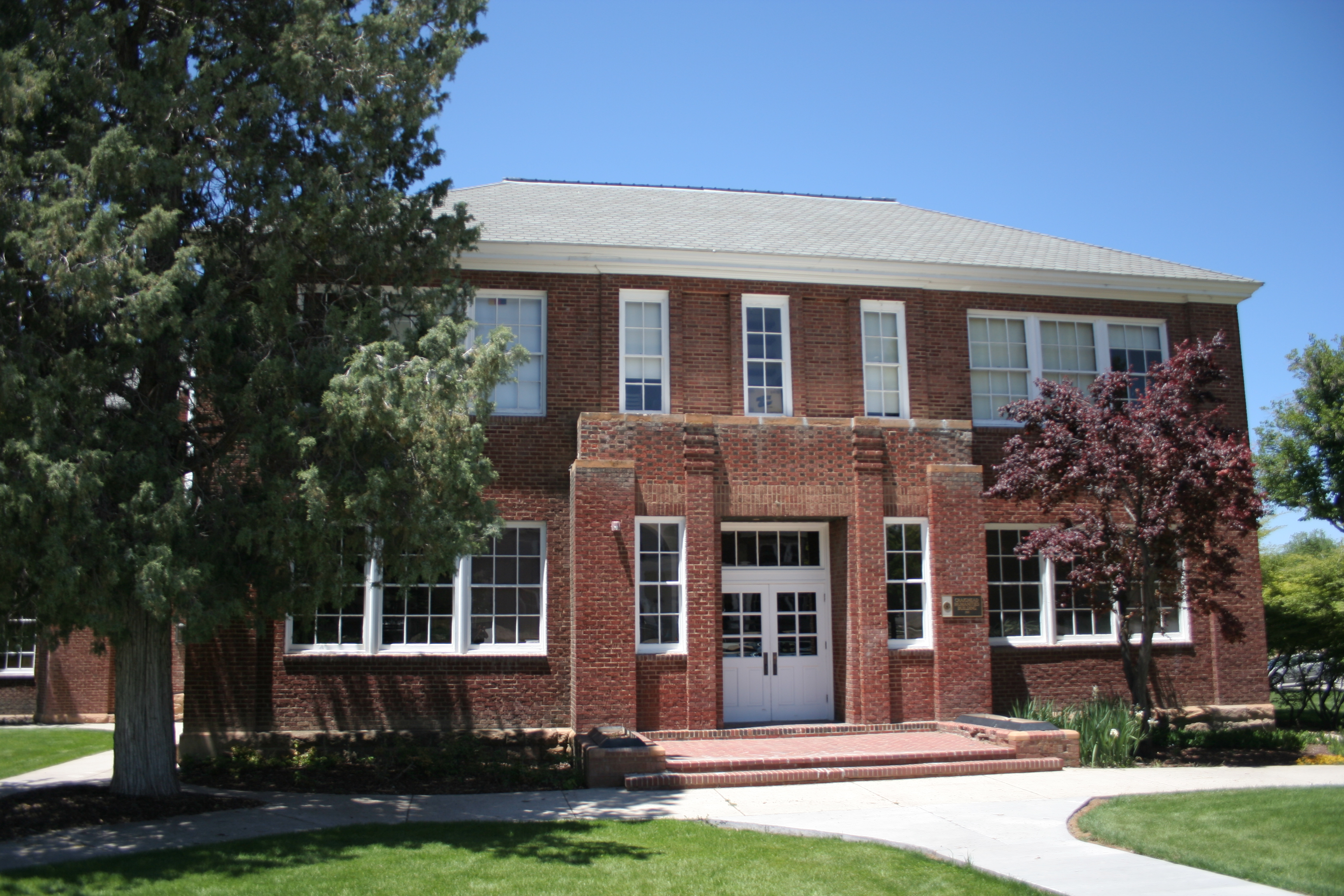
- Craighead Humanities Building

- Location within Utah Location within the United States
- Architect: Multiple
- Architectural style: Bungalow/Craftsman, Late Victorian
- NRHP reference No.: 78002690
- Added to NRHP: October 2, 1978

Wasatch Academy is an independent, coeducational college-preparatory boarding school in Mount Pleasant, Utah. Presbyterian minister Duncan McMillan founded the school in 1875. It began as a church-supported elementary school and became a college-preparatory school in 1912. The academy has operated independently since 1972.

The school's historic campus was added to the National Register of Historic Places in 1978. Its boys' basketball program won three state championships under coach Geno Morgan before leaving regional competition for an independent schedule.

== History ==
=== Presbyterian school ===
McMillan arrived in Mount Pleasant on March 3, 1875. Jeremiah Page, the town's postmaster, asked him to organize a school for children from about 30 local families who had left the Church of Jesus Christ of Latter-day Saints. Under the arrangement, McMillan took responsibility for the mortgage and other debts on a meeting place known as Liberal Hall, as well as for furnishing the building and establishing a curriculum. Classes began on April 19 with 44 pupils. Enrollment reached 109 by the end of the term.

Financial problems soon led McMillan to transfer Liberal Hall to Presbyterian trustees in Salt Lake City in return for $500. Delia R. Snow was the school's first teacher. In 1880, the academy came under the Presbyterian Board of Home Missions, which operated it for much of the next century. The school initially taught elementary grades. By 1887 its curriculum included rhetoric, mathematics, government, bookkeeping, history, physiology, Latin, and physics.

Classes remained in Liberal Hall until a two-story brick school building opened in 1891. During George Marshall's tenure as principal, from 1894 to 1905, the academy added boarding accommodations for students from outside Mount Pleasant. Later construction included an administration building, a boys' dormitory, and a hospital. The development of Utah's public-school system changed the academy's role, and in 1912 it adopted a college-preparatory curriculum.

=== Independent school ===
The Presbyterian Church ended its sponsorship in the early 1970s, and Wasatch Academy became an independent school in 1972. The Internal Revenue Service recognized the independent organization as tax-exempt in October of that year.

In the late 1980s, fewer than 100 students attended the academy, whose capacity was then about 185. Most came from outside Utah, including students from six countries. Enrollment approached 200 by 1995. That year the academy completed a new mathematics and science building, the first part of a $4 million campus project that also called for a student center, renovations, and an increase to the endowment.

== Campus and academics ==
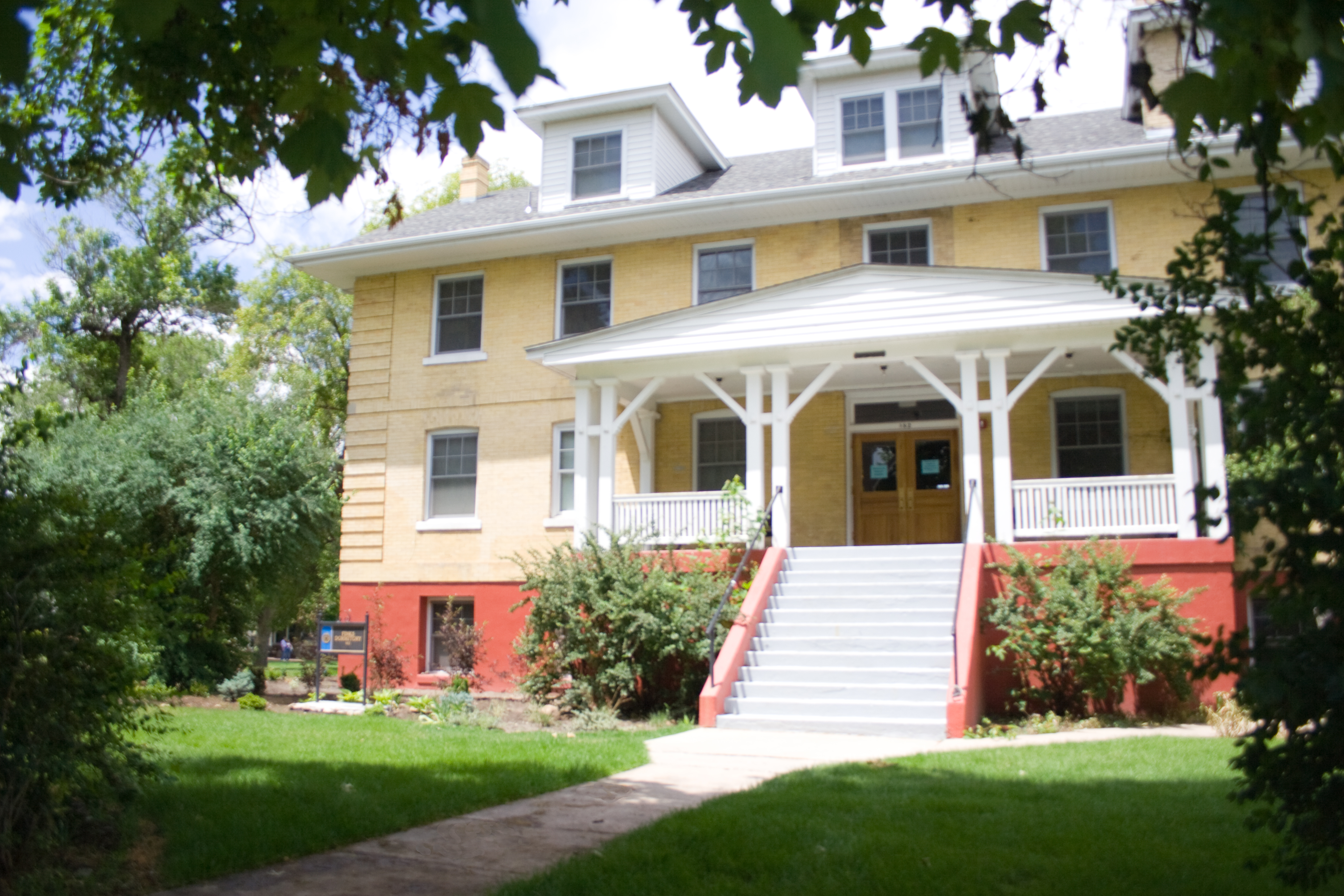
Finks Dormitory

The campus is a historic district listed on the National Register of Historic Places. The register identifies architecture in the district as Late Victorian and Bungalow/Craftsman and gives its periods of significance as 1875–1949. Historic brick buildings on the campus have served as classrooms, dormitories, faculty residences, and a museum.

Wasatch Academy enrolls students in grades 8 through 12 and a postgraduate year. It describes its program as college preparatory and offers Advanced Placement and honors courses alongside visual and performing arts. The arts are part of the graduation curriculum rather than solely extracurricular activities. The school is secular and holds accreditation from Cognia and the Northwest Association of Independent Schools; its affiliations also include the National Association of Independent Schools and The Association of Boarding Schools.

Independent coverage of the school in 1999 described an academic program built around small classes, honors and Advanced Placement courses, arts instruction involving artists from nearby Spring City, and classroom computer access.

The school requires 24 academic credits for graduation. Its requirements cover English, mathematics, science, social studies, a world language, fine arts, and technology, as well as co-curricular electives and one immersion for each year of enrollment. The curriculum includes engineering, computer science, robotics, rocketry, industrial fabrication, and digital-media courses. The academy also provides English-language instruction and a learning-services program; the latter uses individual coaching to develop study and executive-function skills.

Fine arts are part of the graduation requirements: students complete at least one credit in a single arts discipline and another credit in either fine arts or technology. Studio offerings include ceramics, printmaking, and photography, while performing-arts courses include theater, music theory, and guitar. The school maintains performance, recording, exhibition, ceramics, and photography spaces. Its annual performing-arts showcases have included orchestral, vocal, percussion, dance, piano, guitar, and violin performances.

Short interdisciplinary courses known as immersions supplement the regular timetable. Students take part in at least one immersion each year; subjects have included performing arts, gardening, regional history, and international travel. The program combines classroom study with field trips, visiting speakers, or practical work.

== Athletics ==
Wasatch Academy competes as the Tigers. The Utah High School Activities Association (UHSAA) classifies the school as 2A. Its sanctioned programs include basketball, cross country, golf, soccer, swimming, tennis, track and field, volleyball, and wrestling; the academy also offers equestrian, snowsports, climbing, hiking, and mountain biking. UHSAA records credit Wasatch Academy with state titles in boys' basketball, boys' cross country, football, boys' golf, girls' tennis, and boys' track and field.

=== Equestrian program ===
The equestrian program offers English and Western riding. A U.S. Department of Education profile described an indoor arena, a 20-stall barn, turnout pens, an outdoor riding area, and a galloping track; its coursework covered riding as well as horse care and stable management.

The academy added a rodeo team in 2016 after operating an English-riding program for about a decade. Rodeo is organized separately from UHSAA sports, and the team competes through the Utah High School Rodeo Association. In 2017, Wasatch Academy sponsored a UHSRA competition in Mount Pleasant at which academy student Jaden Tree won the boys' cutting event.

=== Boys' basketball ===
The boys' basketball team won three state championships under coach Geno Morgan. Morgan compiled a 128–20 record over six seasons. The program left Utah regional competition in 2014 to play an independent schedule against teams from around the United States. In 2016, the team received its first invitation to the national high-school tournament then sponsored by Dick's Sporting Goods; it entered the eight-team field ranked No. 19 by USA Today.

Wasatch Academy was one of six schools that formed the National Interscholastic Basketball Conference in 2021.

== Notable alumni ==
- Sonita Alizadeh, Afghan rapper and opponent of forced marriage
- George L. Bartlett, United States Marine Corps brigadier general
- Yousef Bashir, Palestinian-American author and peace activist
- Nolan Hickman, basketball player in the NBA G League, and the school's first McDonald's All-American
- Elisabeth Omilami, actress and human-rights activist
- Jackson Rowe (born 1997), Canadian basketball player in the Israeli Basketball Premier League
