= Bashir Yusuf Ibrahim =

Nigerian politician and businessman

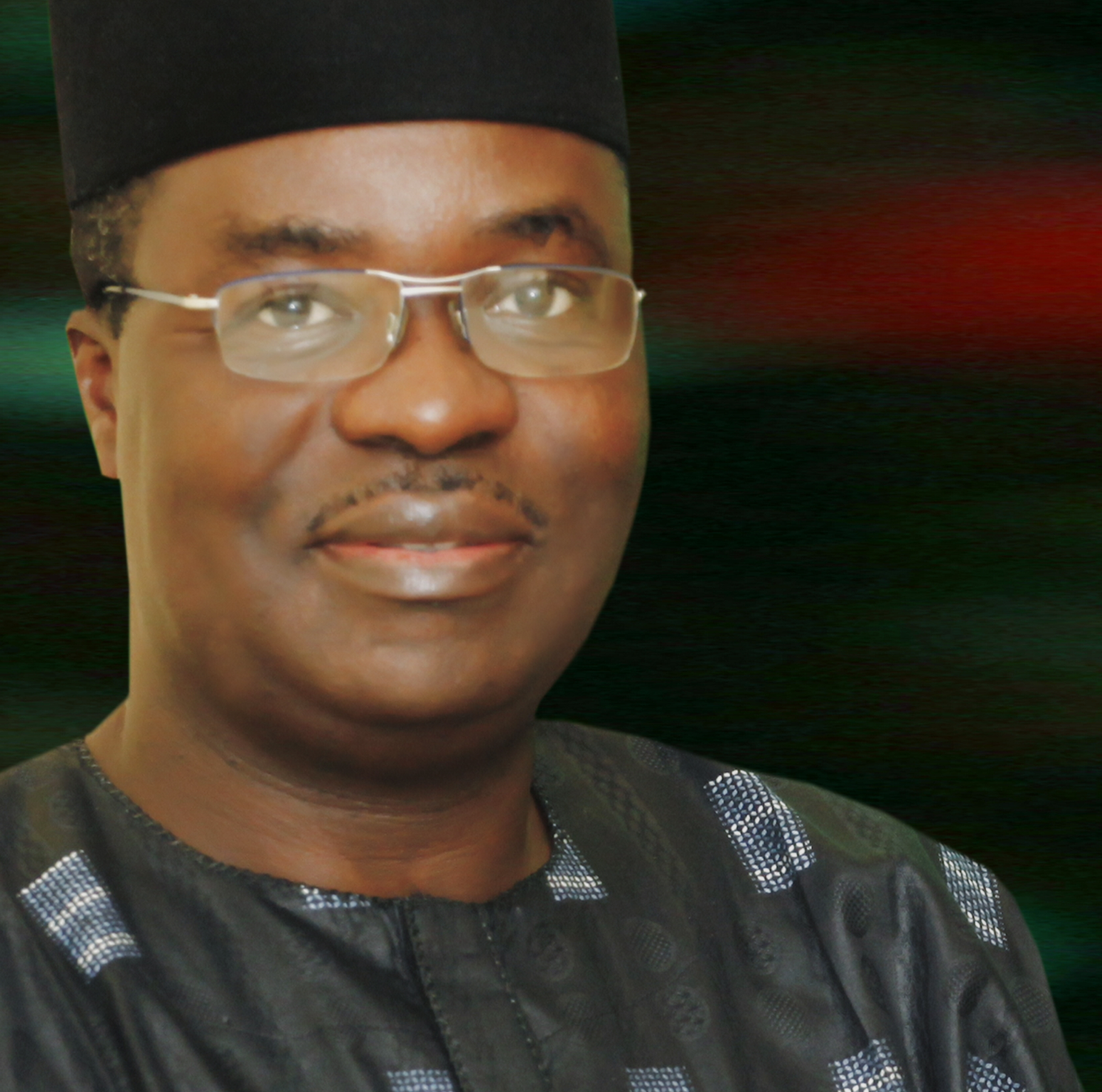
- Born: 23 January 1961 (age 65); Kano
- Occupations: Businessman and politician

Bashir Yusuf Ibrahim (born January 23, 1961) is a Nigerian politician and businessman. He was the National Chairman of Peoples Democratic Movement (PDM), a Nigerian political party.

The PDM, which initially started out as a movement formed in the wake of Nigerians' agitation for democratic governance, was denied registration as an official political party by the Abacha regime. In the wake of Nigeria's return to democracy in 1999, the movement became a major building block of what would become Nigeria's ruling party, the People's Democratic Party (PDP). After years of running the country's affairs and a seeming disconnect between what had been envisioned and what had, in fact, been achieved by the PDP, some members of the PDM decided to leave the PDP and register the movement as a party, so that it could abide by the ideals which guided its formation. The PDM was, thus, registered as a political party in 2013, with Bashir as its first National Chairman.

Mentored by the late Aminu Kano, Bashir has had a public service career spanning several decades, serving in various capacities including that of Special Adviser to both President Olusegun Obasanjo and Vice-President Atiku Abubakar at varying stages of their tenures, and on several committees including the Justice Niki Tobi Committee on the 1999 Constitution, among others.

He is a fellow of the Nigerian Leadership Initiative and the Aspen Institute. He is also a Member of Institute of Directors, Nigeria.

== Early life and family background ==
Bashir Yusuf Ibrahim was born on January 23, 1961, to Alhaji Yusuf Ibrahim and Hajjiya Khadija Usman. Both parents came from Islamic clerical families. His maternal uncle, Sheikh Tijjani Usman, with whom Bashir was quite close as a child, was one of the best known scholars in West Africa until his death in a road accident in 1970. Initially the third of six children, Bashir became the first son of the family after he lost his elder brothers to a measles epidemic which hit the city of Kano in the early 1960s. By the time his father died in July 1982, he was one of the fourteen children his father left behind.

Bashir was brought up in a typical African Muslim home in a polygamous family with his mother being the first of four wives. His father, Alhaji Yusuf Ibrahim, was an itinerant businessman who travelled through Africa, dealing in ivory and precious metals and ran a transport business in former Zaire, now Democratic Republic of the Congo. Alhaji Yusuf Ibrahim was also a polyglot, learning to speak several African languages during his many extended business trips, and one of the African foreigners and businessmen deported from the Congo in 1972 during the regime of Mobutu Sese Seko.

Despite his long periods of absence, often spending several months away from their Kano home, Bashir's father, himself being the eldest male in the extended family, ensured that his children had a sheltered upbringing under the watchful eyes of several uncles. Bashir's father was a strict disciplinarian who was especially concerned about the company that his children kept, and due to his father's strict nature, Bashir had few friends growing up.

Bashir looked up to Mallam Aminu Kano of NEPU and PRP fame, and due to his closeness to one of Aminu Kano's nephews who was his classmate. He visited the Aminu Kano home often, interacting with his mentor and role model and gaining insight into the politics of the day. Aminu Kano was revered for his role in challenging the structure of power in Northern Nigeria as well as traditional norms and traditions and for promoting the education of women and girls in a bid to establish a progressive society for all.

== Education ==
Bashir was introduced to schooling and education at the earliest stage of his life; in accordance with the prevalent Northern Muslim tradition, he began attending an Islamiyyah (Islamic school) at the age of 3. Three years later, at the age of six, he was enrolled in Mayanka (now Jakara) Primary School, Kano, while also attending three different Islamiyyah schools – one in the morning before conventional school hours, the other in the evening after he returned from primary school, and yet another after night prayers. His first ever Islamiyya school was founded by the late Mallam Aminu Kano with whom Bashir shared immediate neighbourhood.

After primary school, Bashir was admitted to School for Arabic Studies in 1973 where he obtained the Teachers Grade II Certificate in 1977 and quickly obtained a General Certificate of Education from the School of Preliminary Studies, Kano in 1978. He was an Interim Joint Matriculation Board, IJMB student at the same School of Preliminary Studies from 1979 to 1981 where he was Secretary-General and President of the Students Union. In 1981, he took a course in Journalism at Graduate School, USDA in Washington DC and New York Institute of Technology, after which he sat for the Interim Joint Matriculation Board Exam in 1982. His was a student at the prestigious Bayero University, Kano, graduating in 1986 with a Second Class Upper degree in History and Political Science.

In 1991, he took a course in Economic Reporting at the United States Information Service in Lagos. In 2004, he obtained a Master's Degree in International Affairs and Diplomacy from the Ahmadu Bello University, Zaria, and is also an alumnus of Wits Business School, the Harvard Kennedy School, and the Institute of Public Private Partnerships, Washington DC.

== Early influences ==
The city of Kano is known for its progressive politics, cosmopolitan nature and business. This holds true in Bashir's case, as not only did he become involved in politics at a rather young age, but also began his foray into business and profit-making at an even younger age. As a child Bashir never lost an opportunity to make an income, buying and selling goods from and to other youngsters.

The older Bashir grew, the more he learnt at the feet of his mentor, Mallam Aminu Kano, that leadership was about vision, courage and sacrifice and that for society to make progress leaders must envision a better future for their people and take them there regardless of the obstacles. Like many young people in Kano back then, politics gradually became an integral part of Bashir's life and it was, therefore, only natural for him to gravitate towards formal political engagement and seek to become part of the process. In 1978, at the age of 17, his foray into politics officially began when he became a member of the (now defunct) Unity Party of Nigeria (UPN). His preference for UPN, the late Obafemi Awolowo’s party, was due to the founder's touted socialist ideology. He, however, left for the Peoples Redemption Party (PRP) in 1979 after Aminu Kano left the National Movement and joined others to found his own party.

In 1979, in reaction to Aminu Kano's disqualification from the presidential race by General Obasanjo's military regime on the grounds of non payment of tax, Bashir and a childhood friend, Awwalu Anwar, organised a youth protest to challenge the disqualification. The protest, however, mutated into a citywide riot which lasted for several days. Later he was to become a Students Union activist and the first Deputy Senate President of National Association of Nigerian Students, NANS.

In 1986, Bashir was detained at the interrogation centre run by NSO, Nigeria's secret police, on Awolowo Road in Lagos due to his political activism. He was later transferred to Shagamu prison in Ogun State between August and December 1986, where he spent most of his time in a hospital bed after he fell sick due to poor conditions and ill treatment. He was detained under Decree 2 by the military dictatorship of General Ibrahim Babangida for leading a nationwide one-million-signature campaign to force the military to release his former boss, Governor Abubakar Rimi of Kano State, and other political prisoners, who were jailed by military tribunals, some of whom were serving long prison terms of three hundred years. Twenty-five other leaders of the signature campaign were detained along with him, including three former members of the House of Representatives and the former Governor of Jigawa State, Sule Lamido.

== Family life ==
Bashir married his first wife in 1986, a few months before graduation, after meeting her a year earlier in the university. She succumbed to cancer after several years of treatment. His second marriage lasted four years. He has been happily married to his current wife since 1999. Bashir has seven children - two male, five female.

== Public service and professional career ==
Bashir first took up formal employment in 1978, when he was employed as a senior information assistant at the Kano State Ministry of Information. In 1981, he joined the Kano State Television Corporation where he trained as news producer. In 1982, he was appointed Personal Assistant to the governor at the Research Unit of Kano State Government House. He served in this position for a year and returned to pursue further education after his boss, governor Abubakar Rimi lost his re-election. After graduation from university in 1986 he spent his national service year as Teaching Assistant on Public Policy and Foreign Policy where he handled final year students at the Department of Political Science in his alma mater, Bayero University, Kano.

Upon completion of the mandatory one year national youth service, Bashir took up employment at the College of Arts and Science as a lecturer in Government. He held that job from 1987 to 1990, after which he became the Features Editor and subsequently Editor of The Nation on Sunday (now rested) in 1991.

In January 1992, he was appointed the Director-General of the Jigawa State Government House and served in this capacity until early 1994. As Director-General, he was the Chief of Staff to the State Governor and the administrative head of the Government House. His stance on corruption, advice, and impact on government policy in the young state earned him the governor's approval and a few uncomplimentary nicknames.

By the time Bashir left Jigawa State Government House, the new state had become something of a model for other states created at the same time in 1991. Although the new military administrator had asked him to stay, Bashir politely declined and returned to Abuja where he established his own practice as public policy consultant at New Paradigm Consulting. One of his earliest projects was his preparation of the concept note for the First Lady's Family Support Programme and articulation of its education component. Later, he consulted for such highly regarded private and public entities such as Afri-Projects Consortium, Petroleum (Special) Trust Fund and Bureau of Public Enterprises, Nigeria's privatization agency under the management of Mallam Nasir El-Rufai where he was commissioned to advise on organization-wide remodeling and restructuring, rescaling of human resources and a new compensation structure for the new and energetic workforce.

While his consulting practice thrived, Bashir doubled as Executive Director at Blueprints Consortium, a leading media and publishing company located in Abuja between 1998 and 2001. He held this position until 2001, when he was appointed Special Assistant to then President, Olusegun Obasanjo, on Conflict Resolution. He resigned from this appointment in 2002. He was later to serve as Special Assistant to then Vice-President Atiku Abubakar, between 2003 and 2006. After his resignation, Bashir was appointed the President of Dirham Group, a conglomerate with interests in energy, telecommunications and real estate; a position he still holds today. He was also the Chairman of the Board of Directors of Layer3 Limited, an enterprise solutions company, and has a wide range of business interests in media, Oil and Gas, and construction, among others. In 2010, Bashir served as Consultant on Maritime Security in the Gulf of Guinea for the Michael Ansari Africa Centre of the Atlantic Council. The Atlantic Council is a Washington DC-based think-tank with strong foreign policy bias and influence with the US State Department

He has served on several committees including the Justice Niki Tobi Committee on the 1999 Constitution, as Secretary of the Fundraising Sub-Committee of the Presidential Committee on the Rehabilitation of the National Mosque, as Chairman of the Committee for Restructuring the Abuja Investment Company, and as a member of the Federal Government Committee on Job Creation under Chairman Aliko Dangote.

Bashir has been invited to speak on democracy, political parties and elections at home and abroad, including at Nigeria’s National Institute for Policy and Strategic Studies, National Democratic Institute, International Republican Institute, United Nations Development Program, University of Oxford, United Kingdom, etc.

== Political career ==
Bashir first joined the UPN in 1978, after which he joined the PRP, founded by his mentor, Aminu Kano, in 1979. He remained in the PRP until 1983 when the PRP became factionlised due to internal ideological crisis. He became a member of the Nigeria Peoples Party (NPP) in 1983. In 1989, he joined the Social Democratic Party (SDP), and went on to coordinate the Ali Sa'ad Birnin Kudu Governorship campaign in 1991. His candidate won the election and served as governor from January 1992 until the General Sani Abacha coup of November 1993. He was a member of the Hope ’93 MKO Abiola Campaign Organisation in 1993. The MKO campaign was successful but the victory was soon annulled.

In 1994, Bashir became the Interim National Secretary of the All Nigeria Congress (ANC), after which he joined the Peoples Democratic Movement (PDM). Both ANC and PDM were denied registration as political parties by the General Sani Abacha regime.

With hopes of a democratic system of government becoming more feasible, Bashir joined others to form the Peoples Democratic Party (PDP) in 1998. He was also a member of the Olusegun Obasanjo Presidential Campaign team and contested for the Kano Central Senatorial seat in 2002. He, however, lost out at the party primaries, which were marred with allegations of rigging.

After failing to clinch the Senatorial nomination, he was called upon to step in as the National Coordinator of the Dr. Alex Ekwueme Presidential Campaign due to the sudden departure of the substantive coordinator abroad for medical treatment. When the incumbent president, Obasanjo, won the party primaries, Bashir chose to assume a neutral position since he did not support the president's candidacy. Nonetheless, he was again appointed a member of the Olusegun Obasanjo Presidential Campaign. After the elections had been won, he was appointed as a Special Assistant to Vice-President Atiku Abubakar on National Assembly and, later, on Political Matters, a job he kept until 2006 when he, again, resigned to return to private life.

Bashir went on to become the founding Secretary of the Movement for the Restoration of Democracy (MRD), which was formed to fight President Obasanjo's third-term agenda. The MRD later closed ranks with the Movement for the Defense of Democracy (MDD) to form the Movement for the Restoration and Defense of Democracy (MRDD). Realizing that he could not be part of government while working in the opposition, Bashir turned in his resignation and left the PDP in 2006.

MRDD, however, had a few leadership challenges and could not gain traction. Some members, including Bashir, decided to move on to form a proper political party, and the Action Congress (AC) was born. Bashir also emerged as the Interim National Secretary of the AC, running the secretariat with the support of other key members such as Wale Osun and Yinka Odumakin. He served in various capacities within the Action Congress, including Secretary of the Constitution Drafting Committee, Secretary of the Manifesto Drafting Committee, Secretary of the National Launching Committee, and of the Committee on Distribution and Zoning of National Offices. He also contested for the office of the substantive National Secretary of Action Congress but, instead of opening the office to contest, some leaders of the party decided to forgo internal democracy and proceeded to zone the office to a particular individual Jigawa State in favour that particular candidate. Subsequently, Bashir was appointed the Director of Administration and Logistics of the Action Congress Presidential Campaign. The AC Presidential Candidate was his former boss, Atiku Abubakar, and while the campaign was brilliantly executed, Atiku's presidential bid was not successful due, reportedly, to his ongoing fight with his boss, President Olusegun Obasanjo, over his tenure elongation plan, the many court cases he had to pursue and the quality of the elections when they eventually held.

After the results of the electiom were announced, Umaru Musa Yaradua – who was declared winner under very controversial circumstances – announced his dissatisfation with the quality of the election and decided to form a Government of National Unity. This announcement divided the ranks of the Action Congress, with those who wanted join the Government of National Unity decamping to the ruling PDP and the few who wanted to maintain a vibrant opposition remaining in the AC.

Bashir held on to the AC for a while longer, but upon realizing that key figures who had chosen to remain in the party were actually working with President Yar’adua, he knew that the centre could no longer hold. He returned to the PDP in 2009. Earlier on, President Yar’adua, in a bid to win those who had left the PDP back had promised to make changes and right the many wrongs plaguing the party. He, however, died before he could implement those changes and the PDP went from bad to worse under his successor, with internal party democracy completely abandones. Before the January 2011 presidential primaries and the general elections in April, two National Chairmen of the PDP were thrown out in rapid succession, allegedly to ensure the new President's total control of the Party. Nonetheless, in 2010 Bashir was called, once again, to help manage the Presidential Campaign of former Vice President Atiku Abubakar, who contested for the PDP ticket against the incumbent president, Goodluck Jonathan. Bashir served as Deputy Director General of the campaign in charge of Operations. It was the most competitive contest the party had witnessed up to that time, with the incumbent reportedly coming to the primaries with two prepared texts - one for victory, another for defeat. In the end, the incumbent won the presidential primary and went on to win the general elections as well. After the general elections, Bashir decided to call it quits with politics and went on to register a free zone company in Dubai, United Arab Emirates.

By June 2012 it was becoming obvious Nigeria was beginning to face one of its most trying times under the leadership of President Goodluck Jonathan, with the country deeply polarized between North and South, Muslims and Christians and a raging insurgency in the North East and a runaway insurgency, which claimed thousand of lives. Bashir decided to return to Nigeria's turbulent political terrain in a bid to help reverse his country's drift towards anarchy. In this regard he, along with other political associates began the move to rebuild the defunct Peoples Democratic Movement and pull it out of the ruling PDP to create a strong alternative opposition with a view to removing the PDP from power in 2015 or beyond. However, upon registration of the PDM as a political party, some of his comrades and colleagues backed out after they allegedly struck a deal with the ruling party and accused him and others of unilateral action and disloyalty to the PDP. Despite this, Bashir and other members proceeded.

The Peoples Democratic Movement (PDM), which Bashir led as the National Chairman, was especially youth-inclined. Bashir has stated on several platforms that for the PDM to be different, it needed to be re-engineered, redefined by a new vision for Nigeria and driven by the youth. The PDM succeeded in catching the imagination of the Nigerian youth, becoming the first political party in Africa to introduce online membership registration, attracting over 3 million members within a few months. It also made history as the first Nigerian political party to advocate for voting rights for Nigerians abroad.

In 2015, Bashir emerged as Chairman of the Nigeria Inter-Party Advisory Council (IPAC) - the umbrella organization of Nigeria's registered political parties. Each political party is represented on the council by its National Chairman. The primary objective of the Council was to ensure compliance with Political Parties Code of Conduct and to work with the Independent National Electoral Commission to ensure free, fair and credible elections in Nigeria. During his tenure as Chairman, he initiated the first ever IPAC Annual Conference bringing together representatives of political parties to discuss the state of Nigeria's democracy and how it could be made better. He held this position until 2016, when he was appointed as Deputy Chairman of the Presidential Committee on Constitution and Electoral Reform under the leadership of former Senate President Ken Nnamani. The Committee was tasked to make broad consultations with Nigerians and develop proposals for the reform of Nigeria's electoral system and processes. Among the Committee's proposals was the introduction of independent candidature, out-of-country diaspora voting, electronic voting and new executive bills to support the proposals. Bashir was the Chairman of the Sub-Committee which reviewed existing electoral laws and proposed new ones.
