= Bashir ibn Amr al-Kindi =

Bashir ibn Amr al-Hadhrami al-Kindi بَشیر(بُشر) بن عَمرو الحَضرَمی الکِندی

Personal life
- Died: 10th of Muharram, 61 A.H. / 10 October, 680 AD
- Cause of death: Killed in the Battle of Karbala
- Resting place: Karbala, Iraq
- Known for: Being a companion of Husayn ibn Ali

Religious life
- Religion: Islam

Bashir ibn Amr al-Hadhrami al-Kindi (Arabic: بَشیر(بُشر) بن عَمرو الحَضرَمی الکِندی) was a companion of Husayn ibn Ali who was martyred at the Battle of Karbala.

== Lineage ==
His father's name is mentioned as Amr or Umar. He was from Hadhramaut from the Kinda tribe.

== Accompanying Husayn ibn Ali ==
Bashir or Bushr and his sons, Muhammad, joined Husayn ibn Ali in Karbala. on the Day of Ashura, Bashir was told that another son of his was captivated on the Rey border. He responded: “I leave his affair to God. I do not like him to be captive and me to be alive”.

When Husayn heard this, he told him: “May God have His mercy to you! You are free from my allegiance. Go and try to save your son.”

Bashir replied: “May wild beasts eat me alive if I leave you alone while you have so few people on your side so that I would look for you in caravans. I will never do so”.

Husayn replied him: “so give these clothes to your son, Muhammad, to sell them in order to help free his brother”. Then the Husayn gave him his precious clothes that were worth 1000 dinars.

== On the day of Ashura ==
When Husayn ibn Ali decided to go to the battlefield to start fighting, only two of his companions were still alive: Bashir ibn Amr, and Amr ibn Abi Muta (or Suwayd ibn Amr al-Khath'ami). When Bashir found that the Husayn was preparing to go to the battlefield, he went to fight before Husayn did. So he went to the battlefield and was martyred before him.

in other sources, he is mentioned as one of the early martyrs in the event of Karbala.

He is mentioned in al-Ziarat al-Rajabiyya: “Peace be upon Bashir ibn Amr al-Hadrami”.
