= Ali Reza Asahi =

Afghan bodybuilder (1974–2025)

- Professional bodybuilder

Personal info
- Born: 27 March 1974; Republic of Afghanistan
- Died: 23 January 2025 (aged 50); Kabul, Afghanistan

Best statistics

Ali Reza Asahi (Dari: علی رضا آساهی; 27 March 1974 – 23 January 2025) was an Afghan Hazara bodybuilder, who won a gold medal in the 14th round of the 2023 World Bodybuilding Championships hosted in Seoul, South Korea.

Asahi won the gold medal among the representatives of China, Japan, India, and South Korea in the competition with athletes from 40 countries in the weight category of 85 kg and above.

Asahi died in Kabul, Afghanistan on 23 January 2025, at the age of 50.

== See also ==
- Sport in Afghanistan
- List of Hazara people
