= Khalil Bashir =

Palestinian peace activist (died 2009)

- Born: Deir al-Balah
- Died: 2009
- Children: 6, including Yousef Bashir

Khalil Bashir (Arabic: خليل بشير; died 2009) was a Palestinian peace activist from the Gaza Strip. He gained the attention of news outlets in the early 2000s, when Israeli soldiers occupied his home in Deir al-Balah and strictly controlled his family's movements.

== Life under occupation ==
Bashir's three-story home in Deir al-Balah, which he was born in, was located on land owned by his family for the past 300 years. It was occupied by soldiers in October 2000 due to its proximity to the religious settlement of Kfar Darom, and its usefulness as a lookout point. At the time, the house was home to Bashir, his wife, their eight children, and his mother. Although given the opportunity to leave, Bashir was determined to stay in the "cradle of [his] childhood", knowing if they left they might not be allowed to return to the property. Bashir initiated a lawsuit, which he ultimately lost, to regain control of his home.

Israeli officials declared the home's living room to be "Area A", the only area under the Bashir's control. The bathroom, bedrooms, and kitchen were declared "Area B", which the family could only go to with the permission of soldiers, and the second and third story of the house were "Area C", which were under full control of the Israeli military; the family was told they would be shot if they tried to go upstairs. The greenhouses and orchards outside the home, which had provided the family with substantial income, were destroyed, and the family's donkey was killed.

On October 13, 2000, Bashir's 17-year-old son was shot non-fatally while retrieving water to put out a fire in the garden. In November 2000, Bashir's mother died, and the family fought with the army to be able to hold the Islamic funeral rituals; the soldiers conceded.

Bashir remained adamant about peace. A school principal, he led students at school each morning in a chant for peace. Although he initially hoped that close contact with Israeli soldiers would give Bashir opportunities to share each other's humanity, the reality was less hopeful, with the soldiers remaining distant. Furthermore, groups such as Hamas grew suspicious of Bashir's intentions.

On April 28, 2001, Bashir was shot through his bedroom window, resulting in head and neck injuries.

On February 18, 2004, his 15-year-old son, Yousef, was shot in the spine while he and his father were seeing off UN workers. He was brought to a hospital in Tel Aviv, where he re-learned how to walk.

In August 2005, Bashir announced he would throw a party to celebrate the withdrawal of Israeli forces from Gaza, open to both Palestinians and Israeli settlers and soldiers. At the time, he said "I don't look upon their withdrawal as a victory...the only winner is the cause of peace". For the final weeks of the withdrawal, the family was confined to the living room 24/7. In September 2005, the Israeli evacuation from the Gaza Strip was completed, and the Bashir family regained control of their home.

At the end of 2005, Bashir expressed to NPR that he would like to invite the soldiers who occupied his home back to his home as proper guests of the family.
