= Federal National Assembly =

Federation of Arab Republics parliament

Federal National Assembly مجلس الامة الاتحادي
- Coat of arms of the Federation of Arab Republics

History
- Founded: 1972
- Disbanded: 1976

Leadership
- Speaker: Dr. Kheiri el-Saghir Abu Laqma, Bashir al-Rabiti
- Seats: 60

The Federal National Assembly (Arabic: مجلس الامة الاتحادي) was the parliament of the Federation of Arab Republics.

The assembly included representatives from Egypt, Libya and Syria. The assembly was responsible for examining and ratifying legislation for the Federation, approving budgets and ratifying treaties.

Each of the member republics was represented by 20 members in the Federal National Assembly, elected amongst the members of its People's Assembly. Members were elected on four year mandates. Members elected had to resign from their mandates in their republican parliaments. The Federal National Assembly met twice a year, opening its inaugural session on March 12, 1972 and holding its last session in October 1975. The sessions lasted for three months.

== Elections ==
Egypt

The People's Assembly of Egypt elected the 20 members Egyptian members of the Federal National Assembly. One of the elected members was Dr. Abdul Hamid Hassan, former student union leader and member of the Arab Socialist Union Central Committee.

Libya

The Libyan members were elected by popular vote on March 5, 1972, some 500,000 cast their votes. The vote had been scheduled for February 27, 1972 but was postponed as new requirements for candidates were introduced. As per the requirements from the law from February 27 candidates were required to be Libyan citizens, hold a secondary education certificate, be 30 years old, hold membership in the Arab Socialist Union and deposit 50 Libyan dinars (most of these requirements were added ad hoc after the postponing of the vote in February 1972). Voting was compulsory.

The election result was declared on March 7, 1972 by Minister of Interior Major Abd ul-Mumim al-Huni. The 20 members elected from Libya were Bashir Muhammad al-Rabiti, Al-Taher Salam Kridan, Ali Mustapha al-Misrati, Milad Mohammad Ali al-Oud, Milad Ali Muhammad Abu Amjat, Hassan Abd ul-Hafiz al-Jihani, Khalifa abd ul-Matlub Yunus al-Warfali, Saleh Massoud Bouisir, Dr. Kheiri el-Saghir Abu Laqma, Abdullah al-Hush Abdullah, Ammar Ahmad al-Sa'adi, Mohammad Issa Yehiya al-Barouni, Ali Mustapa Mazak Kadad, Ibrahim Obayd Sa'id, Abbas Mohammad Abd un-Nabi al-Qadiri, Abdus Salam Mohammad ben Nur, Mohammad al-Hazmi Saleh al-Trahouni, Maatuq Mohammad Maatuq al-Zubeidi, Maftah Mohammad bin Issa and Ali Senoussi Abd us-Said al-Mansouri.

== Speaker ==
Dr. Kheiri el-Saghir Abu Laqma of Libya was elected as the speaker of the Federal National Assembly, In his inaugural speech in March 1972 Abu Laqma hailed the Federation of Arab Republics as a step towards Pan-Arab unity. Abu Laqma was later replaced by fellow Libyan Bashir al-Rabiti as speaker of the assembly.

== Disbanding ==
The last session was held in October 1975. The March 1976 session was postponed indefinitely, and the Federation of Arab Republics was dissolved in November 1977.
