= Yousef Bashir =

Palestinian-American writer and peace activist

- يوسف بشير
- Born: 1989 (age 36–37); Gaza Strip
- Citizenship: United States
- Education: Northeastern University (BA); Brandeis University (MA); Johns Hopkins University (DIA)
- Occupations: Writer; peace activist; educator
- Spouse: Bailey Braun
- Children: 2
- Relatives: Khalil Bashir (father)
- Writing career
- Language: English
- Notable work: The Words of My Father

Yousef Bashir (Arabic: يوسف بشير; born 1989) is a Palestinian-American writer and peace activist. His memoir, The Words of My Father: Love and Pain in Palestine, recounts his childhood in the Gaza Strip during the Second Intifada, when Israeli soldiers occupied his family home and one of them shot and seriously wounded him. Bashir later moved to the United States, where he studied international affairs and became an advocate for Israeli–Palestinian reconciliation.

== Early life and injury ==
Bashir was born in the Gaza Strip. His father, Khalil Bashir, was an educator who advocated nonviolence. The family lived near the Israeli settlement of Kfar Darom. In 2000, during the Second Intifada, Israeli soldiers took over the upper floors of their house and confined the family to the ground floor. The occupation continued for several years. Soldiers also destroyed parts of the family's orchards and greenhouses.

On February 18, 2004, an Israeli soldier shot Bashir in the back as he was saying goodbye to visiting United Nations personnel outside the house. He was 15. The Israeli military acknowledged responsibility but did not explain the shooting. The injury damaged his spine, and he was initially unable to walk. After receiving treatment at Sheba Medical Center in Israel, he spent more than a year at a rehabilitation center with Israeli patients. He later described his relationships with the medical staff and other patients as influential in his decision to advocate reconciliation. He regained the ability to walk and returned to Gaza.

In 2005, Bashir attended a Seeds of Peace summer camp in Maine. Later that year, following the Israeli withdrawal from Gaza, the soldiers left the Bashir home.

== Education ==
Bashir initially attended a Quaker school in Ramallah. In 2006, he moved to the United States and enrolled at Wasatch Academy, a boarding school in Utah. He earned a bachelor's degree in international affairs from Northeastern University and a master's degree in coexistence and conflict from Brandeis University.

In 2024, Bashir completed a Doctor of International Affairs degree at the Johns Hopkins School of Advanced International Studies. His dissertation examined the relationship between ideology and governance in Hamas.

== Writing and public work ==
Bashir was a Herbert Scoville Jr. Peace Fellow at the Partnership for a Secure America in 2016. He worked as a congressional intern for Representative Gerry Connolly in 2017 and later interned for Senator Bernie Sanders. Bashir also worked as a congressional-affairs adviser for the Palestinian diplomatic delegation in Washington. He has addressed Jewish and pro-Israel audiences as part of his advocacy for a negotiated peace.

His memoir, The Words of My Father: Love and Pain in Palestine, was published in the United Kingdom in 2018 and in the United States by HarperCollins in 2019. The book describes the occupation of his home, his injury and rehabilitation, and the influence of his father's commitment to nonviolence. The New Yorker characterized it as a personal account that challenged prevailing approaches to the Israeli–Palestinian conflict, while Kirkus Reviews called it an impassioned argument for peace. A review in the Jewish Book Council praised its personal narrative but criticized its limited discussion of Palestinian political leadership.

He became an adjunct faculty member at Georgetown University's Center for Contemporary Arab Studies, where he has taught a course on Palestinian history and politics. In 2025, he worked as an adviser and special assistant to the president and chief executive of Anera.

By 2025, Bashir had established the Saif Foundation, a Washington-based nonprofit that raises money for food, water, clothing, and other assistance in Gaza.

== Personal life ==
Bashir became a United States citizen in 2019. He married Bailey Braun on October 16, 2021, and they live in Washington, D.C. They have two children.
