= Bachir Moustafa Hammoud =

- Born: 1906 (1324 H); Choukine, Lebanon
- Died: 1945 (1365 H)
- Notable work: Diwan Al Bachir

Bachir Mustafa Hammoud (1906–1945) (Bacheer Hammoud, Bachir Moustafa Hammoud Al-Choukini Al-Aameli, Bachir Moustafa Jawad Hammoud, Bachir Hammoud Al-Choukini Al-Aameli, Bachir Al-Aameli, Bachir Bin Jawad Bin Moustafa Hammoud) was a Lebanese poet and Shī‘ah religious leader.

== Early life and education ==
Born in Choukine, moved at early age to Beirut, moved in 1936 to Najaf (Iraq) for religious studies, returned to Lebanon in 1944 after receiving his degree in religious studies.

In Najaf, he was a student of Abdel Raouf Fadlallah.

== Activities and views ==
Wrote a poetry book, known as Diwan al Bachir, written in both formal and unformal Arabic.
