= Beşir =

Beşir (pronounced [beʃiɾ]) is a masculine given name which is used in Turkey. It is derived from the Arabic root -beşr which means herald; harbinger. It is also one of the qualities of Muhammad which is expressed in the Quran.

Notable people with the name include:

== Given name ==
- Beşir Atalay (born 1947), Turkish politician
- Beşir Ayvazoğlu (born 1953), Turkish musical artist, writer and journalist
- Beşir Fuad (1852–1887), Ottoman soldier, intellectual, and writer

== Fictional characters ==
- Beşir, one of the main characters in Aşk-ı Memnu (1975 TV series), Aşk-ı Memnu (2008 TV series) and in the original novel, Aşk-ı Memnu

== Surname ==
- Muhammet Beşir (born 1997), Turkish football player
