= Niki Tobi =

Nigerian jurist

Justice Niki Tobi CON

Associate Justice of the Supreme Court of Nigeria
- Incumbent
- Assumed office 2002

Personal details
- Born: July 14, 1940 Esanma, Bomadi LGA, Delta State, Nigeria
- Died: June 19, 2016

Niki Tobi, CON (July 14, 1940 – June 19, 2016) was a Justice of the Supreme Court of Nigeria. Tobi was born in Esanma, Bomadi LGA, in what is now Delta State. Prior to his career at the bench, he was the dean of Faculty of Law and deputy vice-chancellor (academic services), University of Maiduguri. Niki was called to bar in 1970. He was counsel at the Ministry of Justice and the Department of Customs and Excise between 1971 and 1976. He was appointed to the Supreme Court in 2002.

He was known for his legal erudition and wide knowledge of legal principles. Niki Tobi died on June 19, 2016.
