= Bashir Ramathan =

Ugandan boxer

Bashir Ramathan is a Ugandan boxer who has been blind since the age of 17.

Bashir is the subject of two short documentary films: Eveready directed by Paul Szynol and Bashir's Vision directed by Daniel Roher.
