= Bachir Qamari =

Moroccan literary critic, novelist and playwright (1951–2021)

- Born: 10 January 1951; Nador, Morocco
- Died: 24 June 2021 (aged 70); Rabat, Morocco
- Occupations: Literary critic, novelist and playwright

Bashir Qamari (Arabic: بشير القمري; 10 January 1951 – 24 June 2021) was a Moroccan literary critic, novelist and playwright.

== Early life and education ==
Qamari was born in Nador in 1951. He studied Arabic literature at the Mohammed V University in Rabat (1975 MA, 1987 PhD).

== Career ==
Qamari was professor at the faculty of literature in Kenitra and taught contemporary literature at the Mohammed V University in Rabat.

He started working for Al-Alam in 1972, then he joined the Union of Writers of Morocco in 1976, where he became a member of its central office from 1996 to 2004.

== Death ==
On 24 June 2021, Qamari died in Rabat due to illness.

== Bibliography ==
- QAMARI, Bashir. al-Muh:ârib wa bi-l-aslih:a. Kenitra: al-Bűkîlî li-l-Nashr, 1995. (the fighter and his weapons)
- QAMARI, Bashir. al-Tinnîn . Rabat: Űbtîmâ, 1998.(the dragon)
- QAMARI, Bashir. Fî al-infitâh al-nas:s: wa-l-qirâ´. Rabat: Qâfila al-Kitâb, 2002. (literary criticism)
- QAMARI, Bashir. Fî al-tah:lîl al-darâmâturdjî lil-nas:s. Tánger: Manshűrât Shirâ`, 1999. (analysis and dramaturgy of texts)
- QAMARI, Bashir. H:afriyât al-mudun. Kenitra: al-Bűkîlî li-l-Nashr, 1996. (on excavations)
- QAMARI, Bashir. H:arb al-basűs. (the war of camels)
- QAMARI, Bashir. "Huwiyya al-naqd al-adabî bi-l-Magrib". in: Madini, Ahmad Hadjmuri Abd al-Fattah eds., Al-Adab al-magribi al-h:adîth `alâmât wa qas:âs:id. Rabat: Manshűrât Râbit:a Udabâ` al-Magrib, 2006, 65-98. (on literary criticism in Morocco)
- QAMARI, Bashir. Iklîdin: tarâdjîdiâ malh:amiyya. Kenitra: Al-Bűkîlî lil-T:ibâ`a wa-l-Nashr wa-l-Tawzî, 2002. (Ekledin: a tragic epic)
- QAMARI, Bashir. Madjâzât dirâsât fî al-ibdâ`al-`arabî al-mu`âs.ir. Beirut: Dâr al-Âdâb, 2000. (on contemporary Arab literature)
- QAMARI, Bashir. Radj`a Laylâ al-`Amariyya. Rabat: Qâfila al-Kitâb, 1999.(The return of de Layla al-Amariyya. Theatre)
- QAMARI, Bashir. Shi'riyya al-nas:s: al-riwâ´î. Rabat : Al-Bayâdir, 1991.(literary criticism concerning poetry)
- QAMARI, Bashir. Sirr al-bahlawân . Kenitra: al-Bűkîlî li-l-Nashr, 1997. (the secret of the country-side)
- QAMARI, Bashir. T:arâ´iq tah:lîl al-sard al-adabî. Rabat: Manshűrât Ittih:âd al-Kuttab al-Magrib, 1992. (analysis of the literary narrative)
