= Bechir Tekkari =

Tunisian politician

Bechir Tekkari is a Tunisian politician. He is the Minister of Higher Education and Scientific Research. Prior to this, he was the Minister of Justice and Human Rights.

== Biography ==
Bechir Tekkari was born in Ksibet Mediouni, Tunisia in 1952. He studied law at the University of Tunis, then received an MPhil in Law and Political Science. He received a PhD in 1983 and the agrégation in 1984. He also received a degree from the International Institute of Human Rights in Strasbourg, France and from the Institut de Presse et des Sciences de l'Information at Manouba University. He has taught at the University of Tunis and served as the Dean of the Law School at the University of Sousse.

In 2002, he was appointed as Minister of Justice and Human Rights. In 2010, he became the Minister of Higher Education and Scientific Research.

He is a board member of the Constitutional Democratic Rally.
