= Bashir Babale =

Nigerian politician

Member of the House of Representatives
- In office 2011–2019
- Constituency: Minjibir/Ungogo Federal Constituency

Personal details
- Born: Kano State, Nigeria
- Party: All Progressives Congress
- Occupation: Politician

Bashir Babale is a Nigerian politician who has served as a member of the House of Representatives, representing the Minjibir/Ungogo Federal Constituency in Kano State. He was elected as a member of the All Progressives Congress in 2011 and served until 2019.

== Early life and education ==
Bashir was born on 26 June 1977 in Kano State, Nigeria. He received his early education in Kano, where he obtained a Grade II Teachers' Certificate from Government Teachers' College, Kano, in 1995. He later attended the Federal College of Education, Kano, and obtained a Bachelor of Arts degree in Education from Bayero University Kano. He is a member of the House of Representatives (Nigeria) who served between 2011 and 2019 under the platform of All Progressives Congress.

== Political career ==
Bashir his political career as a member of the All Progressives Congress (APC). He was elected to the House of Representatives in 2011 to represent the Minjibir/Ungogo Federal Constituency of Kano State. He was re-elected in 2015 and served as a member of the 8th National Assembly until 2019. In the 2019 Nigerian general election, Sani Ma'aruf Nass was elected to represent Minjibir/Ungogo Federal Constituency in the House of Representatives, succeeding Bashir.
