= Bashir Ladan Aliero =

Nigerian academic

- Citizenship: Nigeria
- Predecessor: Bello Sheu

Bashir Ladan is an academic and the current vice chancellor of Kebbi State University of Science and Technology, in Aliero, Kebbi State Nigeria. Bashir took over from the acting vice chancellor Bello Shehu and was appointed by Atiku Bagudu, the Governor of Kebbi State.
