= Bachir Ammoury =

Lebanese professional basketball player

No. 5 – Hekmeh BC
- Position: Small forward
- League: Lebanese Basketball League

Personal information
- Born: January 29, 1983 (age 43) Detroit, Michigan, U.S.
- Listed height: 1.98 m (6 ft 6 in)
- Listed weight: 102 kg (225 lb)

Career information
- Playing career: 2001–present

Bachir Ammoury (born January 29, 1983, in Detroit, Michigan) is a Lebanese professional basketball player currently playing for Sagesse in the Lebanese Basketball League. He was also represented the Lebanon national basketball team that participated in the 2013 William Jones Cup in Chinese Taipei, after being called by coach Ghassan Sarkis to play as a local player. Bashir signed his first professional contract for the Lebanese Zahle side Anibal Zahle along with brother Tarek. However, in 2014 Bachir encountered a promising deal from Tadamon Zouk in the 2014 season after the team had reached the Lebanese first division since the 1999.

== Personal life ==
Bachir is the brother of Tarek Ammoury who also plays in Tadamon Zouk.
