= Bashir Aliyu Umar =

Nigerian professor, Islamic scholar and Islamic finance specialist

Bashir Aliyu Umar OON
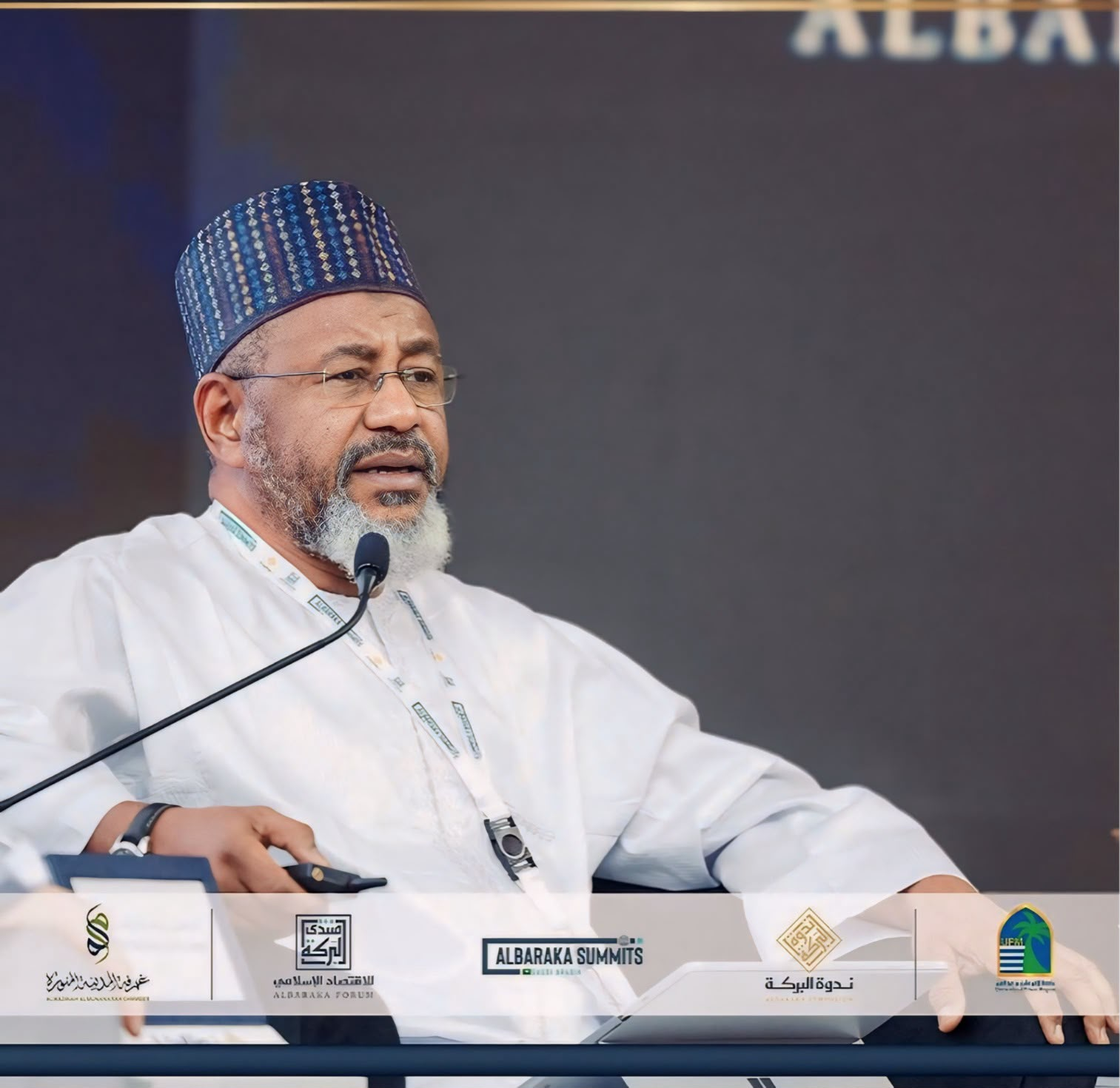
- Bashir Aliyu Umar
- Born: July 27, 1961 (age 65); Unguwar Yola, Kano, Nigeria
- Education: Ahmadu Bello University; Islamic University of Madinah (BA, MA, PhD in Hadith and Islamic Studies)
- Occupations: Professor of Hadith, Islamic scholar, Islamic finance adviser
- Employer: Bayero University Kano
- Known for: Islamic and non-interest finance, financial regulation, Hadith studies
- Awards: Officer of the Order of the Niger (OON)

Bashir Aliyu Umar OON (born 27 July 1961) is a Nigerian professor of Hadith, Islamic scholar and specialist in Islamic and non-interest finance. He is a professor at Bayero University Kano and has held academic, regulatory and advisory roles in Islamic finance in Nigeria and internationally.

Umar served as Special Adviser on Non-Interest Banking to the Governor of the Central Bank of Nigeria (CBN) from 2010 to 2014 and later became Deputy Chairman of the CBN's Financial Regulation Advisory Council of Experts (FRACE).

Internationally, has also served on the Shari'ah Committee of the International Islamic Liquidity Management Corporation (IILM) in Malaysia, the Shari'ah Board of the Islamic Financial Services Board (IFSB), headquartered in Kuala Lumpur, Malaysia, and the Shari'ah Board of the Islamic Development Bank (IsDB) Group, headquartered in Jeddah, Saudi Arabia.

He was appointed to the Shari'ah Board of the Accounting and Auditing Organization for Islamic Financial Institutions (AAOIFI), based in Bahrain, for the 2024–2028 term.

In August 2026, Umar was appointed Chairman of Ghana's Non-Interest Financial Advisory Council (NIFAC), established as part of the country's framework for non-interest finance.

Alongside his academic and financial-sector work, Umar has held public, scholarly and religious leadership roles. In April 2025, he became president of the Supreme Council for Shari'ah in Nigeria (SCSN), having previously served as its vice-president. He has also served as Vice-President of the Union of African Scholars, headquartered in Bamako, Mali.

== Languages ==
Umar publicly lists Hausa, Arabic, English and French among his languages. He lists Hausa at native or bilingual proficiency, Arabic and English at full professional proficiency, and French at elementary proficiency.

== Early life and education ==
Bashir Aliyu Umar was born on 27 July 1961 in Unguwar Yola, Kano.

He began his tertiary education in electrical engineering at Ahmadu Bello University, Zaria, before pursuing Islamic studies at the Islamic University of Madinah in Madinah, Saudi Arabia. He earned bachelor's, master's and doctoral degrees in Hadith and Islamic Studies from the university.

== Academic career ==
Umar joined the Department of Islamic Studies at Bayero University Kano, where his academic work has focused on Hadith and Islamic studies.

In 2026, the university council ratified his promotion to the rank of full professor of Hadith. Bayero University also lists Islamic Finance and Islamic Civilisation Studies among his research interests.

== Islamic and non-interest finance ==
Umar's work in Islamic banking and non-interest finance has included advisory, regulatory and institutional roles within Nigeria's financial sector.

He served as Special Adviser on Non-Interest Banking to the Governor of the Central Bank of Nigeria from 2010 to 2014 and previously served as Chairman of the Shari'ah Advisory Committee of Stanbic IBTC Bank in Nigeria.

During his tenure as Special Adviser, the Central Bank issued guidelines for the regulation and supervision of non-interest financial institutions, Nigeria's first non-interest banks were licensed and CBN liquidity-management instruments for the sector were introduced.

Umar later became Deputy Chairman of the Central Bank of Nigeria's Financial Regulation Advisory Council of Experts (FRACE). In July 2026, Proshare continued to identify him in this position in its coverage of Nigeria's non-interest finance sector.

He has also served as a member of the Takaful Advisory Council of Experts of Nigeria's National Insurance Commission, extending his advisory work to the Islamic insurance sector.

Umar has participated in international standard-setting work in Islamic finance. Publications of the Islamic Financial Services Board identify him as a member of its Shari'ah Board from 5 April 2021.

== International financial advisory roles ==
Umar has held positions with a number of international Islamic finance institutions.

He serves as a member of the Shari'ah Committee of the International Islamic Liquidity Management Corporation (IILM), an international institution headquartered in Kuala Lumpur, Malaysia. IILM records for the 2023–2026 term list him as the Nigerian member of its Shari'ah Committee, representing the Central Bank of Nigeria.

He has also served as a member of the Shari'ah Board of the Islamic Financial Services Board (IFSB), an international standard-setting body headquartered in Kuala Lumpur, Malaysia. IFSB publications list him as a member of the board from 5 April 2021.

Umar was a member of the Shari'ah Board of the Islamic Development Bank Group. IsDB publications list him among the members of the Group Shari'ah Board as of 31 December 2021 and 31 December 2022. The Islamic Development Bank is headquartered in Jeddah, Saudi Arabia.

In October 2024, Umar was appointed to the Shari'ah Board of the Accounting and Auditing Organization for Islamic Financial Institutions (AAOIFI) for the 2024–2028 term. AAOIFI is an international Islamic-finance standard-setting organisation based in Bahrain.

Umar has also been identified as a member of the Council of Scholars of the International Shari'ah Research Academy for Islamic Finance (ISRA) in Malaysia.

In August 2026, he was appointed Chairman of Ghana's Non-Interest Financial Advisory Council (NIFAC). The council was inaugurated by the Bank of Ghana on 18 August 2026 as part of Ghana's framework for non-interest financial services. NIFAC provides advisory support concerning the regulation and supervision of non-interest financial institutions in Ghana.

== Public service and international engagement ==
Earlier in his public-service career, Umar served as a Permanent Commissioner at the Kano State Shari'ah Commission.

His subsequent public-sector work included senior advisory and regulatory roles in non-interest banking and finance at the Central Bank of Nigeria, including service as Special Adviser to the CBN Governor and Deputy Chairman of FRACE.

Umar has also participated in international dialogue forums involving diplomats, policymakers, mediators and representatives of international organisations. In 2025, he participated in the Oslo Forum in Norway in his capacity as President of the Supreme Council for Shari'ah in Nigeria.

== Religious scholarship and leadership ==
Alongside his academic and financial-sector work, Umar has held leadership positions within the Supreme Council for Shari'ah in Nigeria (SCSN), previously serving as its vice-president.

He also serves as Chief Imam of Al-Furqan Mosque in Kano.

In April 2025, he was appointed president of the Supreme Council for Shari'ah in Nigeria following the death of Sheikh AbdulRasheed Hadiyatullah.

Umar has also served as Vice-President of the Union of African Scholars, an organisation headquartered in Bamako, Mali.

== Recognition ==
Umar was awarded the Nigerian national honour of Officer of the Order of the Niger (OON).
