= Bashir Saad =

Lebanese basketball player

Bashir Saad (born March 3, 1991, in Zahle) is a Lebanese professional basketball player, playing for the club Anibal Zahle in the Lebanese Basketball League. He is (6 ft 6 in) tall and weighs 216 lb.

== Career ==
Saad currently plays for Anibal Zahle. He has also played for Al Mouttahed Tripoli and competed with the junior national team at the FIBA Under-19 World Championship 2007.
