= Bechir Guellouz =

Tunisian diplomat

His Excellency Béchir Guellouz
- محمد البشير قلوز
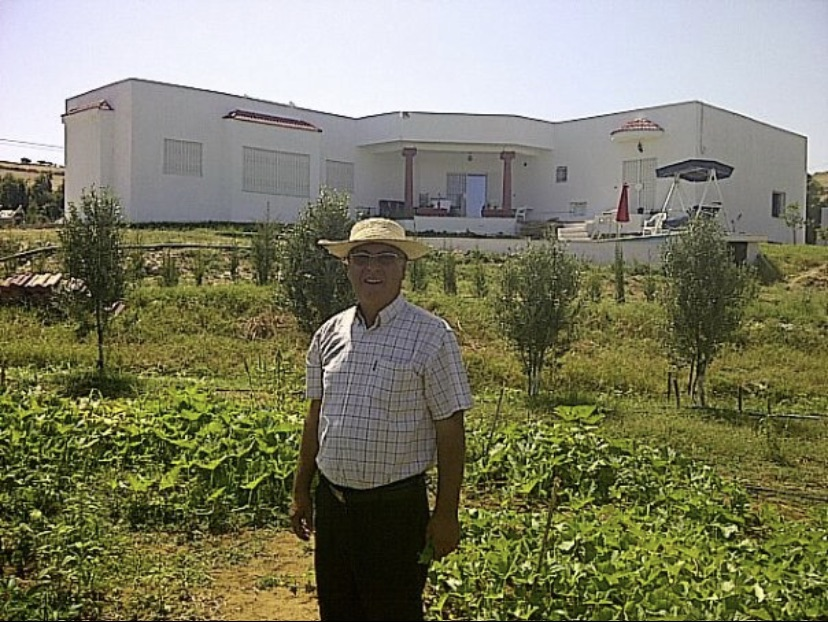

Diplomat
- President: Habib Bourguiba; Zine El Abidine Ben Ali

Personal details
- Born: Mohamed El-Béchir Guellouz; June 17, 1946 (age 79) Metline, Tunisia
- Children: 3
- Relatives: Azzedine Guellouz; Souâd Guellouz
- Education: Jean Moulin University Lyon 3
- Occupation: Diplomat, Ambassador, Minister
- Awards: Officer of the Order of the Republic of Tunisia

Mohamed El-Béchir Guellouz (born June 17, 1946) is a Tunisian former diplomat.

== Biography ==
Béchir Guellouz obtained a bachelor's degree in Arabic languages and Civilization from Jean Moulin University Lyon 3.

In 1967, Guellouz began working at the Ministry of Foreign Affairs, where he held numerous positions in the diplomatic corps.

In May 1999, he became a Director at the Tunisian Diplomatic Institute for Training and Studies.

Guellouz served for 42 years in the various Tunisian Diplomatic and Consular Missions in Lyon, Belgrade, New Delhi, Baghdad and Beijing.

Guellouz has carried out numerous missions and participated in the summits of the Non-Aligned Movement, the Organization of African Unity, numerous sessions of the United Nations General Assembly as well as the Third conference of United Nations Convention on the Law of the Sea.

Guellouz retired as Minister Plenipotentiary in 2007. He enjoys his retirement in his native village Metline, where he writes books on foreign affairs and policy and regularly participates in training young Diplomats at the Diplomatic Institute.

== Honours ==
Officer of the Order of the Republic of Tunisia
