= Béchir Bouazzat =

French modern pentathlete

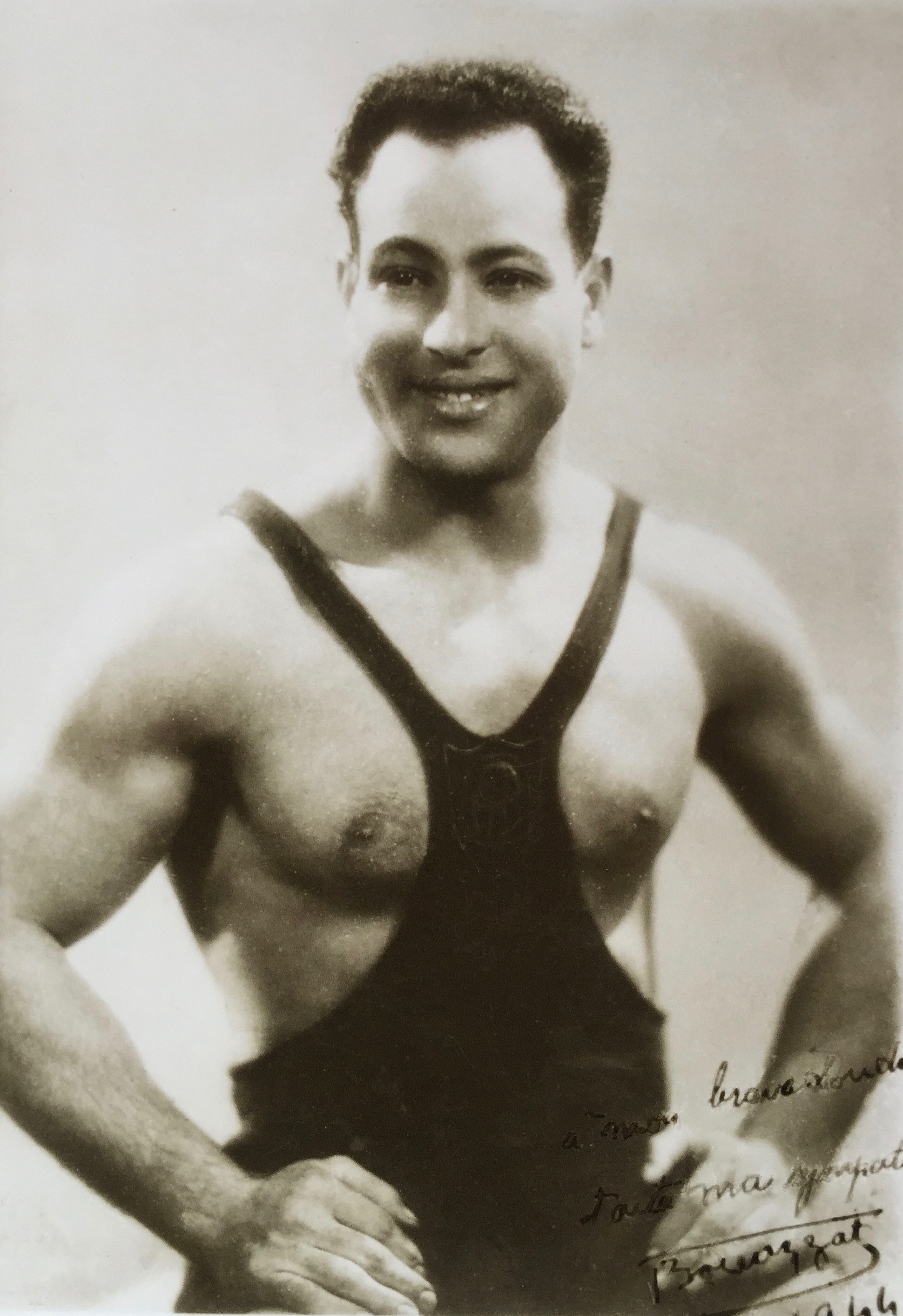

Personal information
- Born: 5 October 1908 Gammarth, Tunis, Tunisia
- Died: 29 December 1944 (aged 36) Val-de-Marne, France

Sport
- Sport: Modern pentathlon

Béchir Bouazzat (5 October 1908 – 29 December 1944) was a French modern pentathlete of Tunisian descent. He competed at the 1936 Summer Olympics. He was killed during World War II.
