= Suwayd ibn Amr al-Khath'ami =

Suwayd ibn Amr al-Khath'ami سُوَیْد بْن عَمْرو الخَثْعَمی
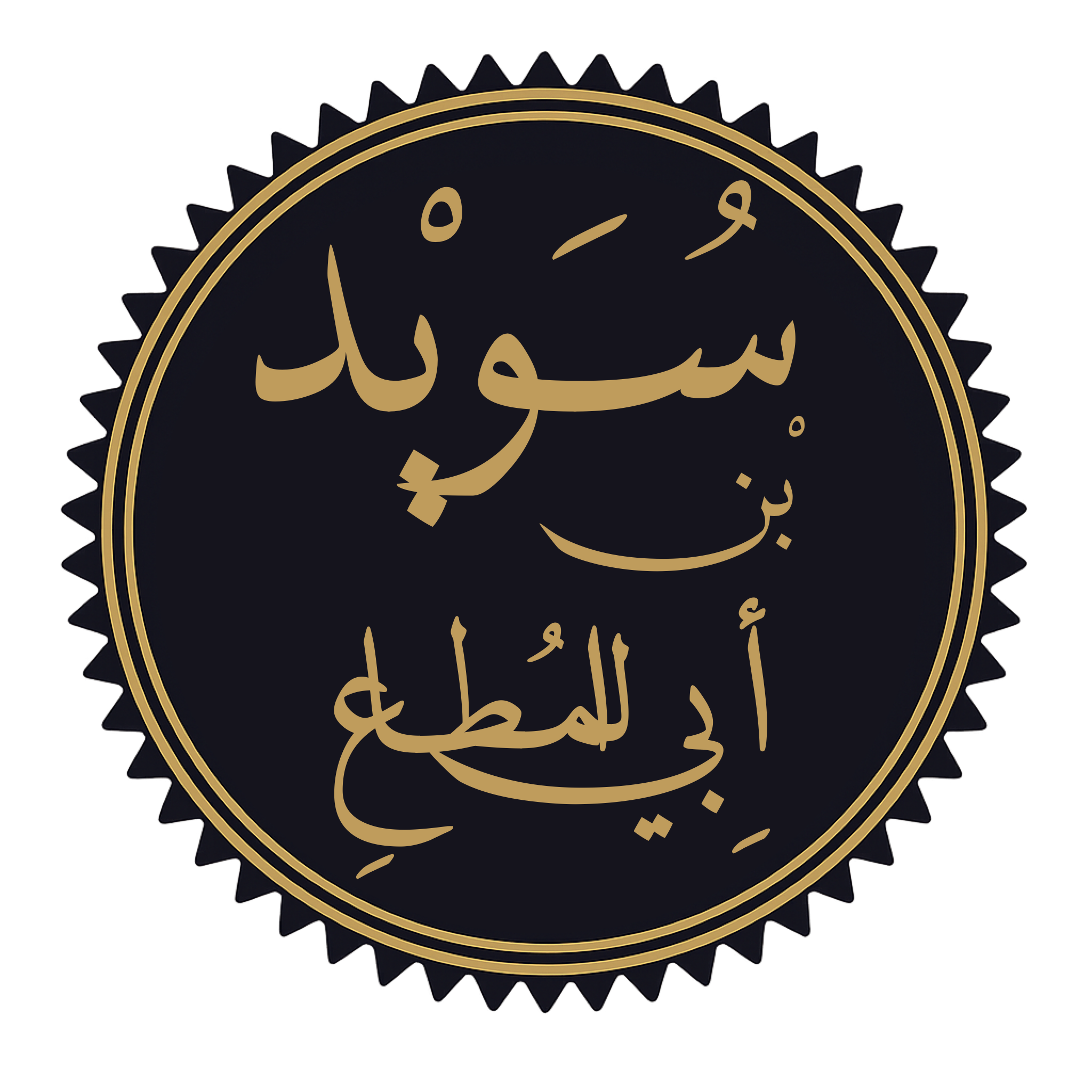

Personal life
- Died: 10th of Muharram, 61 A.H. / 10 October, 680 AD
- Cause of death: Killed in the Battle of Karbala
- Resting place: Karbala, Iraq
- Known for: Being a companion of Husayn ibn Ali

Religious life
- Religion: Islam

Suwayd ibn Amr al-Khath'ami (Arabic: سُوَیْد بْن عَمْرو الخَثْعَمی) was the last martyr of Karbala.

== Lineage ==
Suwayd ibn Amr ibn Abi Muta' al-Khath'ami was a nobleman from the Khath'am tribe. He was known as a pious man and a skillful and brave warrior.

== On the day of Ashura ==
Suwayd was the last person from Husayn ibn Ali's army who went to the battlefield. He fought bravely against Yazid's army until he was severely injured and fell down among other martyrs, where he was left for dead. However, Suwayd was still alive, and at some point heard people say that Husayn had been killed. With great effort, he got back on his feet and continued to fight until he was martyred. It is said that Urwa ibn Battan al-Tha'labi and Zayd ibn Riqad al-Janbi killed him.
