= Bashir Suleymanli =

- Bəşir Süleymanlı
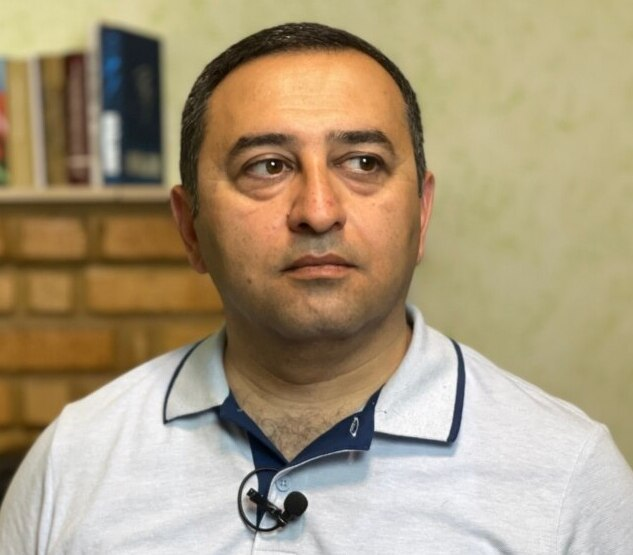
- Bashir Suleymanli in 2024
- Born: March 20, 1980 (age 46); Yevlax, Azerbaijan SSR
- Citizenship: Azerbaijan
- Education: Baku State University (B)
- Occupations: human rights defender, political prisoner
- Years active: 2008–present

Bashir Suleymanli (full name: Bashir Suleyman oglu Suleymanli, Azerbaijani: Bəşir Süleyman oğlu Süleymanlı; born March 20, 1980, Yevlax) is an Azerbaijani human rights defender and political prisoner.

In 2008, together with Anar Mammadli, he founded the Election Monitoring and Democracy Studies Center (EMDS), and from 2008 to 2016 he was the executive director of this organization. In 2013, he was prosecuted together with Anar Mammadli, arrested in May 2014 in the courtroom, and sentenced by the Baku Court for Grave Crimes to three years and six months of imprisonment. A number of local and international human rights organizations recognized him as a political prisoner. He was released in March 2015.

Since 2016, he has headed the Institute for Civil Rights. In March 2025, he was arrested within the framework of a criminal case opened against civil society activists and NGOs in the country. His arrest was also assessed by local and international human rights organizations as politically motivated.

== Early years ==
Bashir Suleyman oglu Suleymanli was born on March 20, 1980 in Yevlakh.

From 1997 to 2001, he studied at the Faculty of Law of Baku State University.

== Public activity ==
During his student years, Bashir Suleyman worked for a number of independent newspapers.

Since the early 2000s, he has worked at the Election Monitoring Center.

After the Ministry of Justice revoked the organization’s state registration in 2008, he and Anar Mammadli founded the Election Monitoring and Democracy Studies Center (EMDS).

From 2008 to 2016, he worked as the executive director of the Election Monitoring and Democracy Studies Center (EMDS).

In May 2014, he was arrested by the Baku Court for Grave Crimes. Local and international human rights organizations considered his arrest politically motivated. He was released in March 2015.

Since 2016, he has headed the Institute for Civil Rights.

== Arrest in 2025, reactions, and detention ==
On the morning of 14 March 2025, the head of the Institute for Human Rights, Bashir Suleymanli, the head of the Election Monitoring Alliance, Mammad Mammad-zade, and several other human rights defenders were detained by the Investigative Department of the Prosecutor General's Office. They were detained in connection with criminal case No. 142006023 (charges under Articles 193–1.3.2 — legalization of funds or other property obtained through criminal means on a large scale; 308.2 — abuse of official powers resulting in serious consequences; and 313 — official forgery of the Criminal Code of Azerbaijan). The case had originally been opened in 2014 against local and international NGOs and was investigated by the department for the Investigation of Grave Crimes of the Prosecutor General's Office. In 2023, the case was closed in relation to some NGOs, but the investigation continued. On the evening of 14 March, Bashir Suleymanli was arrested by decision of the Binagadi District Court and placed in pre-trial detention for three months and 28 days. According to Samir Kazimli of the human rights group “Law Platform”, no reliable evidence of Suleymanli's guilt had been presented, and Suleymanli himself did not admit guilt.

After the completion of the preliminary investigation, the criminal case against Bashir Suleymanli was transferred to the Baku Court for Grave Crimes for consideration. The case was examined by a judicial panel chaired by Judge Vugar Seyidov, with Judges Kamil Aliyev and Nigar Imanova also serving on the panel. The state prosecution was represented by Vusal Mehraliyev.

At the preparatory hearing held on 9 October 2025, Suleymanli requested the termination of the criminal case on the grounds that it was completely unfounded. He stated that there was no corpus delicti in his actions, since funds he received from the United States and the United Kingdom under service contracts had been transferred to his bank account and he had paid taxes on them. His lawyer Elchin Sadigov also submitted a motion for the termination of the criminal case on exonerating grounds. “Our other motion was that if the court decides to continue the proceedings, it should at least release Suleymanli under house arrest until the end of the trial. There are no grounds for keeping him in custody. Bashir Suleymanli was also subjected to criminal prosecution in 2015. At that time, no arrest measure was applied to him and he attended all court hearings. In addition, he has a permanent place of residence. Therefore, during the judicial investigation he could remain under house arrest and leave home only to attend court hearings,” the lawyer said. Presiding judge Vugar Seyidov, however, rejected both motions and scheduled the hearings on the merits.

At the hearing held on 23 October, prosecutor Vusal Mehraliyev announced the indictment. According to the indictment, Bashir Suleymanli allegedly appropriated a total of more than 148,000 manats in grants allocated by the American German Marshall Fund (GMF) and other foundations under the pretext of implementing social projects. It was alleged that, in committing this act, he entered into criminal relations with Mehriban Rahimli (the GMF advisor for Azerbaijan) and other persons, abused his official powers, and failed to notify the relevant authorities about the received grants. Suleymanli did not plead guilty to the charges and stated that the case was politically motivated and fabricated.

At the hearing held on 12 February 2026, Bashir Suleymanli gave testimony. He stated that his activities had been carried out on a legal basis. According to Suleymanli, under service contracts he provided free legal assistance in the regions of the country to war victims, families of those killed in the war, and veterans, funded by grants from two foreign donors, including the United States Agency for International Development (USAID). As evidence, Suleymanli pointed to the fact that information about these activities, including photographic materials, remained available on internet resources documenting the free legal aid provided in the regions by lawyers cooperating with him. He submitted printouts of some of these materials to the court. Suleymanli also referred to a statement made on 15 March 2024 by Zahid Oruj, the head of a committee of the National Assembly of Azerbaijan and director of the Center for Social Research, who had said that “the government of Azerbaijan may appeal to the United States and the EU for assistance in eliminating the consequences of the occupation.” Suleymanli quoted Oruj as saying that if the United States and the EU had “little trust in national construction companies,” they could turn to USAID, which could itself place construction orders with American companies. “In that case the question arises: how is it that a member of parliament and head of the Center for Social Research, Zahid Oruj, speaks about the possibility of involving an international organization in the reconstruction of the liberated territories, while at the same time the investigation accuses NGOs of cooperating with the same structure and qualifies it as a ‘crime’, even though this partnership was carried out on the basis of the country's laws,” Suleymanli emphasized. According to him, USAID funds had also been received by the Ministry of Justice, the Ministry of Health, and a number of other state bodies. Suleymanli also pointed out the unfounded nature of the prosecution's claim that he had received a grant from unidentified employees of the British Embassy in Azerbaijan. Suleymanli and the defense petitioned the court to send an inquiry to the embassy in order to establish the identity of the individuals who had allegedly concluded the grant agreement, if the investigation's claim was accurate. However, the motion was not granted.

=== International attention ===
On 20 March 2025, the UN Special Rapporteur on the situation of human rights defenders, Mary Lawlor, called for the immediate and unconditional release of Bashir Suleymanli and Mammad Mammad-zade.

On 6 April 2025, the World Organisation Against Torture (OMCT) issued a statement regarding the arrest of Mammad Mammad-zade and Bashir Suleymanli. In the statement, the organization called for the immediate and unconditional release of Suleymanli and Mammad-zade, whose detention appears to aim solely at punishing them for their legitimate human rights work, and also demanded the release of all other arbitrarily detained human rights defenders in Azerbaijan.

On 8 April 2025, the International Federation for Human Rights (FIDH) also issued a statement. The FIDH strongly condemned the arrest, detention, and prosecution of Bashir Suleymanli and Mammad Mammad-zade, considering these actions to be a blatant attempt to silence leading advocates for human rights, justice, and accountability in Azerbaijan.

== Personal life ==
He is married and has three children.
