= Bashir al-Rabiti =

Libyan politician

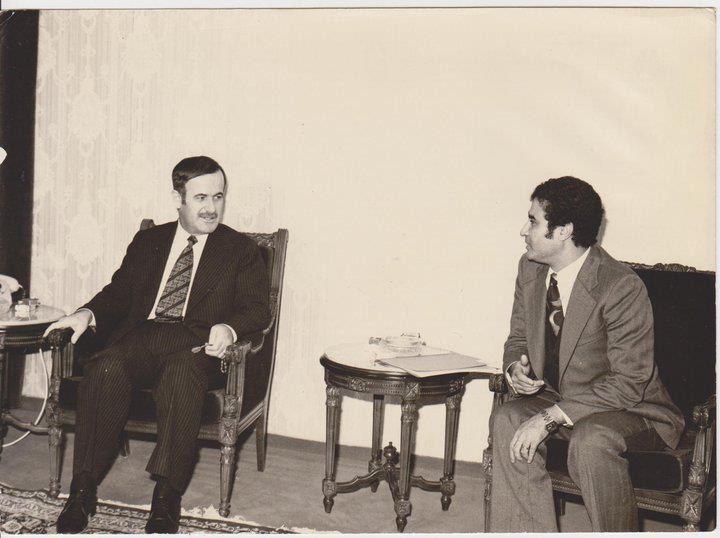
Hafez al-Assad and Bashir al-Rabiti

Bashir Mohammad Massoud al-Rabiti (Arabic: بشير محمد مسعود الرابطي) is a Libyan politician.

He grew up in the Al-Zahara neighbourhood in Tripoli. He served as chairman of the Students Union, which organized university students in Tripoli and Benghazi as well as high school students across Libya.

Al-Rabiti served as the speaker of the Confederal National Assembly (the parliament of the Federation of Arab Republics). He replaced fellow Libyan politician M. Saghir in the position. The Confederal National Assembly met twice a year, holding its first session in March 1972 and its last in October 1975.

Al-Rabiti fled Libya after 1977. In April 1982 he took part in the founding of the Libyan Liberation Organization in Mogadishu, Somalia. He served as the chairman of the Central Committee of the organization.

He later served as chairman of the Libyan National Organization.

Al-Rabiti was a key member of the Cooperation Bureau for Democratic and National Forces, an Egypt-based anti-Gaddafi coalition. In 2004, he reconciled with Muammar Gaddafi and returned to Libya.

As of 2016, al-Rabiti was the chairman of the Libyan National Party.
