= Bashir Idris Nadabo =

Nigerian politician

Member of the House of Representatives of Nigeria from Katsina
- Constituency: Funtua/Dandume

Personal details
- Citizenship: Nigeria
- Occupation: Politician

Bashir Idris Nadabo is a Nigerian politician from Katsina State, who represented the Funtua/Dandume constituency in the House of Representatives at the National Assembly from 2003 to 2007. He served under the platform of the All Nigeria Peoples Party (ANPP).

== Biography ==
Bashir Idris Nadabo is a Nigerian politician from Katsina State and a businessman who owns Al Ihsan Oil and Multi Dynamics Limited.

He was elected to the federal house of representatives in 2003 where he served until 2007. He was succeeded by Abdulaziz Ahmed Tijjani.
