= Bashir Ahmed (Masturi MLA) =

Indian politician

Madhya Pradesh Legislative Assembly
- In office 1957–1962
- Constituency: Masturi

Bashir Ahmed was an Indian politician from the state of the Madhya Pradesh. He represented Masturi Vidhan Sabha constituency of undivided Madhya Pradesh Legislative Assembly by winning General election of 1957.
