= Bashir Ahmed Halepoto =

Pakistani politician (died 2021)

Member of the Provincial Assembly of Sindh
- In office 29 May 2013 – 28 May 2018

Personal details
- Party: Pakistan Peoples Party

Bashir Ahmed Halepoto (died 23 March 2021) was a Pakistani politician who had been a Member of the Provincial Assembly of Sindh, from May 2013 to May 2018.

== Political career ==
He was elected to the Provincial Assembly of Sindh as a candidate of Pakistan Peoples Party (PPP) from Constituency PS-55 Badin-cum-T.M.Khan (I) in the 2013 Pakistani general election.

He was re-elected to Provincial Assembly of Sindh as a candidate of PPP from Constituency PS-70 (Badin-I) in the 2018 Pakistani general election.

== Death ==
He died on 23 March 2021.
