= Muhammad Bashir (disambiguation) =

Muhammad Bashir can refer to:

- Muhammad Bashir (1935–2001), Pakistani wrestler
- Muhammad Bashir (swimmer) (born 1935), Pakistani swimmer
- Muhammad Bashir (weightlifter) (1935–2001), Pakistani weightlifter
- Muhammad Ahmed Bashir (born 1949), Pakistani hurdler
- Mohammed al-Bashir (born 1983), 70th prime minister of Syria
