= Basheer Ahmed Razi =

Indian botanist (1916–1999)

Basheer Ahmed Razi ( 1916 - 1998) was an Indian botanist. His parents were K. Abdul Qadir Khan and Roqia bi. He was one of the early phytogeographers. Prof. B A Razi's classic work is on plant geography of south Indian hill top flora for which he received the coveted D.Sc degree. He divided the Indian sub-continent into 23 botanical provinces based on the climate and floristic pattern. As a plant geographer, Prof. B A Razi had to deal with hundreds of plant species, the identification of which posed problems in early 1950s. This problem gradually drew him to area of plant taxonomy with which he was associated till the end. During his tenure as lecturer in Central college, Bangalore University, he focussed on the floristic studies of various regions including the flora of Bangalore between 1961-1964. This formed the pioneering taxonomic work (Ramaswamy & Razi: Flora of Bangalore district). He initiated taxonomy works in Karnataka and therefore aptly came to be known as Father of Taxonomy in Karnataka. With the establishment of separate University at Mysore, Prof. B A Razi joined Dept of Botany in Manasagangotri in1964. Many district floras were document under his guidance. Such as Rao & Razi, Flora of Mysore district, flowering plants of Manasagangotri campus, Aquatic and marsh plants of Mysore, flora of Chikmagalur district, cyperaceae of Mysore district and many numerous publications. Prof. B A Razi also initiated the Taxonomic Revisions of some difficult groups like Impatiens. A new species was discovered during the revision of Impatiens which Dr Bhaskar named and described the species as Impatiens raziana, in honour of Prof.B. A. Razi. A medal in his honour is awarded annually by the Association for Plant Taxonomy, Lucknow, to one deserving taxonomist.
