= Bashir Nur Gedi =

Bashir Nur Gedi (died 19 October 2007) was the radio manager and acting director of Radio Shabelle, an independent radio station that regularly ran watchdog reports on government corruption in Mogadishu, Somalia. Gedi was murdered in 2007, though the precise circumstances of his death remain unclear. He was one of several prominent members of the station's leadership killed, including fellow acting media directors, Muktar Mohamed Hirabe and Hassan Osman Abdi. He was the eighth journalist killed in 2007 in Somalia.

== Career ==
Bashir Gedi served as the acting director for Radio Shabelle, an independent Somalian radio station that reports news while routinely highlighting government and military corruption. During Gedi's tenure, the government shut down Radio Shabelle, HornAfrik and IQK Koranic, and intimidated the station with violence, shooting at the building and rounding up 18 employees for questioning.

== Death ==
After one week of hiding inside the building of Radio Shabelle because of threats, Bashir Gedi ventured home on October 19, 2007. It was then that he was killed by a group of young gunmen, reported to be between the ages of 14 and 20, who were armed with pistols. Jafar Kukay, Radio Shabelle's successor to Gedi as acting director was quoted in Reuter's reports saying, "The acting chairman of Radio Shabelle, Bashir Nur Gedi, was shot dead by unknown men armed with pistols while sitting in front of his house". To date, his murder remains unsolved. Following his death, two more acting directors of Radio Shaballe, Muktar Mohamed Hirabe and Hassan "Fantastic" Osman Abdi, have been murdered in a very similar fashion.

== Context ==
Journalists in Somalia, which has been in a state of anarchy since dictator Mohamed Siad Barre was overthrown in 1991, routinely face violence, arbitrary imprisonment, and harassment. The danger has intensified since the Somali government, with Ethiopian military help, expelled Islamist militants from Mogadishu in 2007. Journalists not only face attacks from the government but also the insurgent forces angry with the critical reporting by Somalia's media. According to statistics kept by the Committee to Protect Journalists, 40 journalists have been killed or murdered in Somalia since 1992, and it is considered one of the most dangerous places in the world for journalists.

== Impact ==
Although Bashir Gedi knew he was under constant threat of being harmed or killed by those factions angry with Radio Shabelle's reports, he continued to lead his station in their mission to disseminate news. His and his colleagues' subsequent murders have drawn worldwide attention to the problems faced by Somalian journalists.

== Reactions ==
Human Rights Watch called the development of independent and critical radio networks like Shabelle one of the most positive developments since Somalia slipped into anarchy.

According to the Committee to Protect Journalists, "Shabelle, considered one of the leading stations in Somalia, has been harassed, threatened, and attacked by both government security forces and insurgents because of its critical reporting of the ongoing violence in Mogadishu."

Reporters Without Borders said, "The security situation in Mogadishu seems to be completely out of control. Abandoned by the Somali authorities and their international partners, journalists have become key targets who are easily accessible. One after another, the country's leading media owners are being eliminated. By taking no action in this climate of total impunity, those who could be in a position to stop these murders will end up becoming accomplices." It criticized the state of total impunity whereby no suspects are ever brought to trial or convicted.

The Somali press freedom group, the National Union of Somali Journalists (NUSOJ), has proclaimed the murder to be politically motivated. Omar Faruk Osman, the secretary-general of NUSOJ, said, "It is totally intolerable and sends a clear message to each media person that his or her life is at risk because of his or her media activity. We have been appealing to political groups to end killing of media people, but no group listens."

== See also ==
Somali Civil War
