= Olusegun Adeniyi =

Nigerian journalist

- Born: November 6, 1965 (age 60); Ile-Ife, Nigeria
- Education: Obafemi Awolowo University; University of Lagos; Harvard University
- Occupation: Journalist

Olusegun Adeniyi (born 6 November 1965) is a Nigerian journalist, current chair of the editorial board of ThisDay newspapers and a former presidential spokesman to the late President Umaru Musa Yar'Adua.

== Early life and education ==
Adeniyi was born in Ile-Ife, Nigeria. He is a 1989 BSc holder in International Relations from Obafemi Awolowo University, Ile-Ife with a 1997 Masters in International Law and Diplomacy (MILD) from the University of Lagos, and he was also a Fellow at the Weatherhead Centre for International Affairs, Harvard University in 2010/2012 academic session. He conducted his research on the factors that shape incumbent presidential elections in Africa.

== Career ==
He began his journalism career as a Staff Reporter with The Guardian Newspapers in December 1990. In April 1992, he left to join the now rested African Concord magazine as a Senior Staff Writer and in September of the same year, he was appointed the magazine’s Abuja Bureau Chief with accreditation to cover the State House.

Adeniyi, who joined ThisDay newspaper in January 1999 as Deputy Editor of the Saturday newspaper, rose to become editor of the Sunday THISDAY and in August 2005, he was appointed the editor of the THISDAY title paper. On 30 May 2007, he was appointed by the late President Umaru Musa Yar’Adua to be his Special Adviser on Media and Publicity, a position he occupied until Yar’Adua demise on 5 May 2010. He has since written about his experience working for the deceased president.

In July 2007, Adeniyi attended the International Visitor Leadership Programme organised by the US State Department. He was also a Fellow at the Weatherhead Centre for International Affairs, Harvard University in 2010/2011 academic session.

He is currently the chair of the editorial board of ThisDay newspapers. A fellow of the Nigeria Leadership Initiative (NLI), Adeniyi is also a founding member of the National Stakeholder Working Group of the Nigeria Extractive Industries Transparency Initiative (NEITI).

== Personal life ==
Adeniyi is married with three children.

== Books ==
Adeniyi is the author of the following books:

- The Last 100 Days of Abacha
- Abiola’s Travails
- Fortress on Quicksand
- POLITRICKS: National Assembly under Military Dictatorship
- Power, Politics and Death: A front-row account of Nigeria under the late President Yar’Adua
- Against the Run of Play: How an incumbent president was defeated in Nigeria
- From Fry Pan To Fire
- Naked Abuse: Sex for Grades in African Universities

== Awards ==
- 1992 Jakande Prize or Political Reporter of the Year at Nigeria Media Merit Awards (NMMA)
