= Abdul Bashiru =

Ghanaian footballer (born 1992)

Abdul Bashiru (born 17 April 1992) is a Ghanaian professional footballer who last played as a left-back for Ghanaian Premier League side Ashanti Gold.

== Club career ==
Bashiru previously plied his trade with Accra-based club Dreams F.C. before joining Ashanti Gold. He has had spells at Ghanaian clubs; Hearts of Oak, King Faisal, Bechem United, Sekondi Eleven Wise, Inter Allies and Egyptian club Ismaily SC.

=== Dreams FC ===
He helped the club gain promotion into the Ghana Premier League in 2014–15 season. He played for Dreams for 6 seasons and served as captain for the club in the 2016 Ghanaian Premier League season which was their debut in the Ghanaian top flight league. He made 25 league appearances and was nominated for the best Ghana Premier League Player award competing against Latif Blessing and Kwesi Donsu. The award was subsequently won by Liberty Professionals' Latif Blessing. He was also nominated for the best defender of the year award. He was also adjudged the club's best player of the season.

==== Bechem United (loan) ====
In January 2017, he joined Bechem United on a one-year loan deal from Dreams FC. He went on to play in 20 league matches in the 2017 Ghanaian Premier League season and featured in the 2017 CAF Confederation Cup.

=== FC Prishtina ===
In July 2017, Bashiru joined Kosovo top team FC Prishtina on a two-year contract. He played 3 seasons with the club from 2017 to 2020. During his time with the club he won the Kosovar Cup on two occasions in 2017–18 and 2019–20. He also helped them to finish 2nd in the Football Superleague of Kosovo on two occasion; in 2017–18 and 2018–19 seasons, simultaneously qualifying them into the Europa League.

=== Dreams FC ===
After his contract with Prishtina he returned to his old club Dreams FC.

=== Ashanti Gold ===
He was a member of the club's squad that featured in the 2020–21 CAF Confederation Cup.

== Honours ==
FC Prishtina

- Kosovar Cup: 2017–18, 2019–20
