= Bashir Ahmad (camel driver) =

Camel drivers

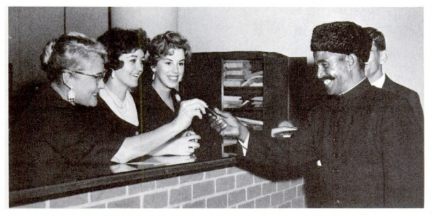
Bashir Ahmad visits the Foreign Service Institute on October 23, 1961. Edrie C. Way, Stephanie Blondi, and Mary Ann Severson, FSI employees, greet him.

Bashir Ahmad Sarban (Urdu: بشیر احمد) (c. 1913 – 15 August 1992) was an impoverished Pakistani camel cart driver, who, on 20 May 1961, met with the then US vice-president Lyndon B Johnson, and accepted an invitation to come to America.

== Invitation ==
In 1961, Lyndon Johnson was in Karachi, Pakistan on behalf of President Kennedy as part of a goodwill mission. He met Bashir Ahmad in a group of camel drivers on a roadside, where the men shook hands and exchanged friendly greetings. Johnson used a phrase he had used regularly in his travels, "Y'all come to Washington and see us sometime," and was surprised when the illiterate camel driver took his offer literally. With significant press attention after the acceptance, the vice-president took advantage of the People-to-People program to fund Ahmad's travel expenses.

Another account indicates that Bashir was invited to the Vice President's ranch and that Johnson's surprise came not at the time but the next day in the press. Ibrahim Jalis, a popular columnist in Pakistan, reported that everyone was excited by the fact that the vice president had invited Bashir to come to America. Perhaps, he had made the above reported statement while shaking Bashir's hand, leading to the misunderstanding that he had been invited. His column was favorable to Johnson, and contained the quote, "Don't conquer a country, don't conquer a government. If you wish to conquer, conquer the hearts of the people."

== Activities ==
Bashir was personally greeted by vice-president Johnson on his arrival in New York City. He was then invited to Johnson's private ranch in Texas. According to Ahmad's sons, the Pakistani beat the vice-president in a horse race, which he described as "the best moment of the trip." During his week-long stay, Ahmad was also taken to Kansas City, where he met ex-president Harry S Truman, who referred to him as 'your excellency', as well as to New York City and Washington D.C., where he was taken to the Empire State Building, the Lincoln Memorial, the Senate Floor, and to President Kennedy's office.

At the end of his stay, as a gesture of further goodwill, vice-president Johnson made arrangements for Bashir to visit the Islamic holy city of Mecca on his return to Pakistan. Per Time Magazine, this act of friendship 'brought tears to the eyes' of the destitute camel driver.
