= Bashir Taraki =

Afghan Taekwondo practitioner

Bashir Taraki بشیر تره کی
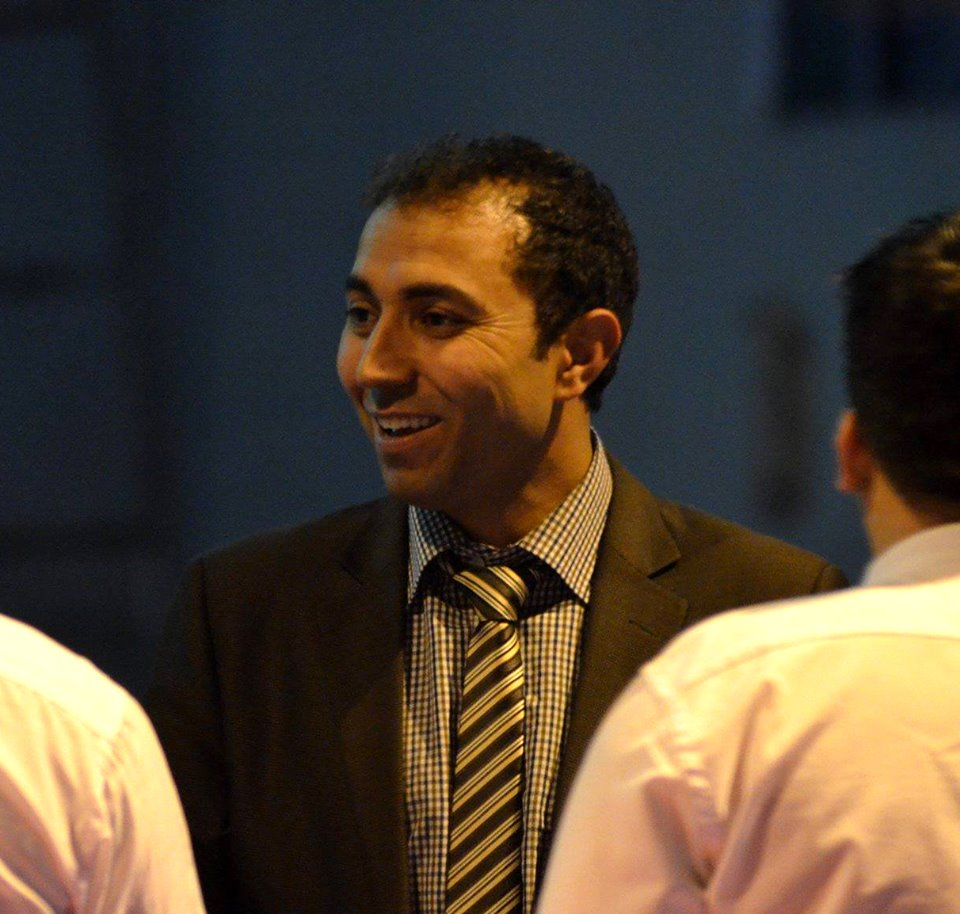
- Born: July 8, 1980 (age 45)
- Occupations: Taekwondo Professional Trainer, Coach, Teacher, International Referee
- Years active: 1990–present
- Children: 4
- Website: bashirtaraki.jimdo.com

Bashir Taraki بشیر تره کی , son of Ali Mohammad Taraki is an Afghan martial artist and coach.

== Early life ==
Taraki was born on 8 July 1980 in Kabul, Afghanistan. He completed his primary education in Rabia Balkhi primary school and his secondary education in Wazir Muhammad Akbar Khan secondary school. He graduated from Naderia High School. He started his Higher education at the University of Education in Faculty of Physical education training department in 2003 then in 2006 He earned a diploma there.

== Athletic background ==
During his studies he became familiar with Olympic sports such as football, handball, basketball, wrestling, boxing, swimming, table tennis, and volleyball. He became the best player in the above-mentioned sports in his class.

He became interested in taekwondo in 1990 under the supervision of Munir Ahmad. In 1996 he earned a black belt. He won several titles. In 2000 he won the title of Afghanistan's Taekwondo Star in weight of (62)kg. He became a member of Afghanistan's national taekwondo team. In 2003 he participated in friendly taekwondo competition between Afghan immigrants in Iran and earned a gold medal. In the same year he participated in Goodwill International championships in India and earned another gold medal.

He was invited by the Afghanistan National Olympic Committee and Afghanistan National Taekwondo Federation to lead the Afghanistan National Taekwondo Team, and to work as Afghanistan National Taekwondo Team´s Coach

He accepted their invitation and became the trainer. He started training the team in 2003. The team participated in many competitions, ranging from regional matches to Asian Games to International Games and even the Olympic Games. Rohullah Nikpai earned a bronze medal for Afghanistan at the 2008 Summer Olympics.

=== Responsibilities ===
- Director of implementation of competitions
- International best and number one referee
- Professional trainer
- Deputy technical director of Social Association of Afghanistan, and one of the founders of the mentioned association
- Afghanistan's national Taekwondo coach
- Director of Munir Ahmad Taekwondo Association, which has 16 branches in Kabul and 14 branches in provinces

He is one of the critics of the national department of sport and National Olympics to defend the rights of athletes.

=== Medals ===
In 2012 Mir Masjidi khan and Ghazi Wazir Muhammad Akbar khan were recognized by President Hamid Karzai for hard work and Rohullah Nikpai's Bronze Medal from London 2012 Olympic Games.
