= Bashir Adeniyi Musa =

Nigerian diplomat (died 2013)

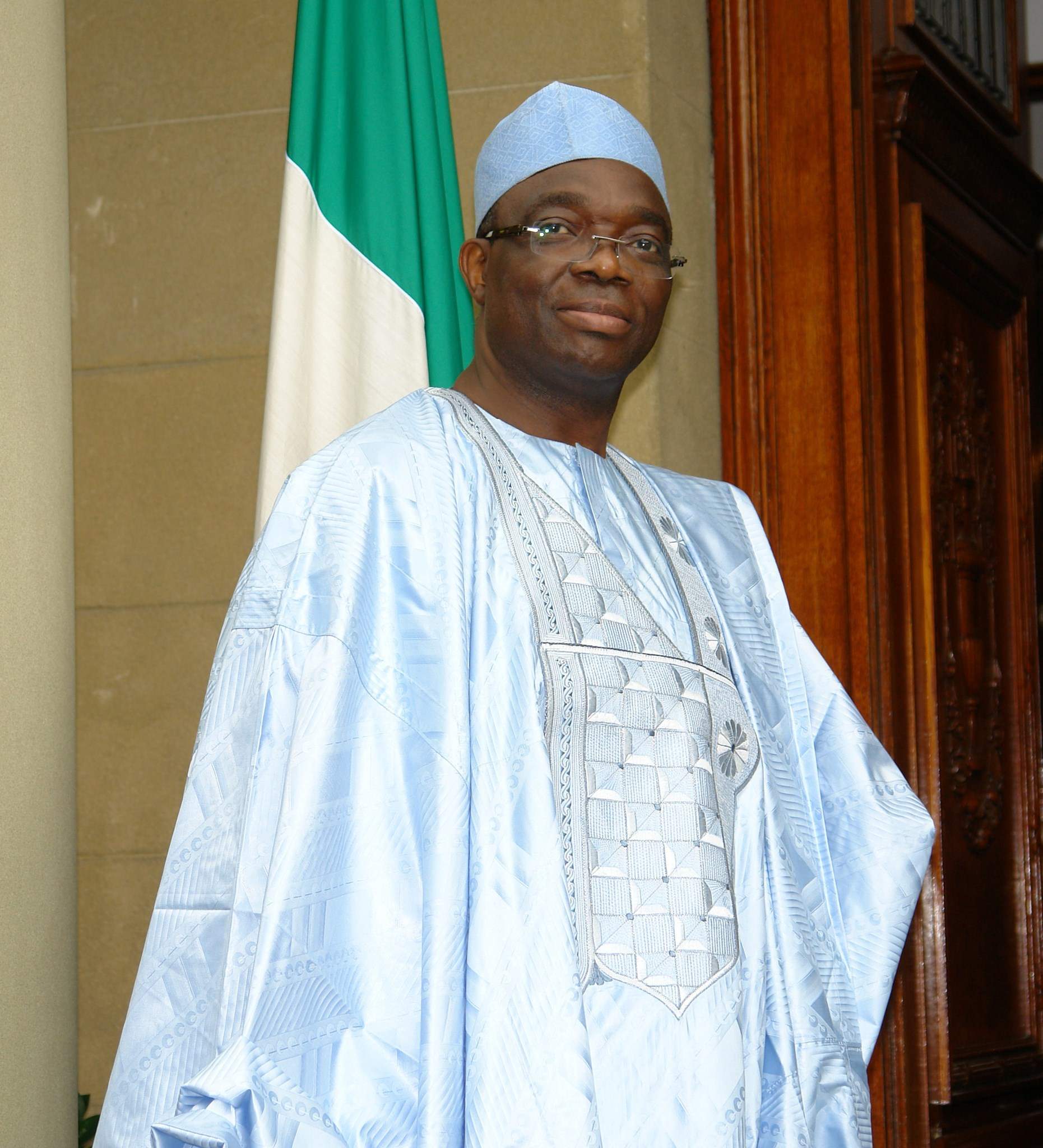
H.E. Ambassador Bashir Musa on resumption of duties at the Bern Embassy in Switzerland

Ambassador Bashir Adeniyi Musa was one of 88 potential ambassadors nominated by the former Nigerian President Goodluck Jonathan and screened by the Nigerian Senate. Ambassador Bashir Adeniyi Musa (Kogi State) was appointed as Deputy Nigerian Ambassador to Switzerland, Bern after the senate votes and proceedings on 8 February 2012. He died on 23 April 2013 after a brief illness.

He was married to Kemi Musa and had four children together; Moji Musa, Sheriff Musa, Mubo Musa and Folashade Musa.
