= 2023 Nigerian Senate elections in Imo State =

2023 Senate elections in Imo

- 25 February 2023

All 3 Imo State seats in the Senate of Nigeria
	Majority party	Minority party	Third party
Party	APC	LP	PDP
Last election	2	0	1
Seats before	2	1	0
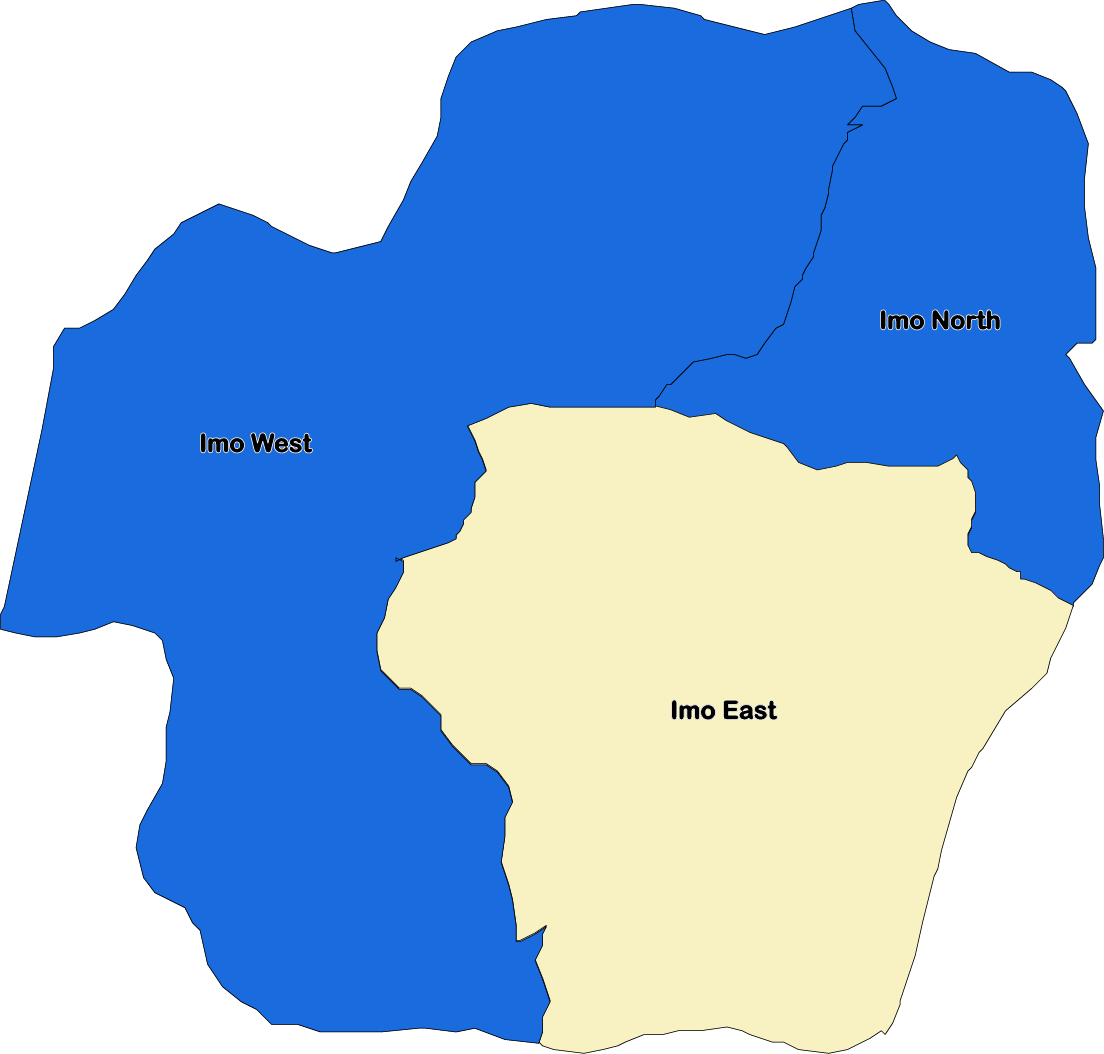
- APC incumbent retiring or lost renomination LP incumbent running for re-election

The 2023 Nigerian Senate elections in Imo State will be held on 25 February 2023, to elect the 3 federal Senators from Imo State, one from each of the state's three senatorial districts. The elections will coincide with the 2023 presidential election, as well as other elections to the Senate and elections to the House of Representatives; with state elections being held two weeks later. Primaries were held between 4 April and 9 June 2022.

== Background ==
In the previous Senate elections, only one of the three incumbent senators were returned with Benjamin Uwajumogu (APC-North) winning re-election while and Samuel Anyanwu (PDP-East) and Hope Uzodinma (APC-West) retired to run for governor. In the East district, Onyewuchi Francis Ezenwa retained the seat for the PDP with 69% of the vote but the other two elections were more controversial as alleged election irregularities initially drew into question Uwajumogu's re-election in the North district while Rochas Okorocha (APC) was alleged to have forced a false election declaration in his favour. Overall, the inaugurations of Uwajumogu and Okorocha were delayed to later in June 2019. These results were a part of a showcase of the state's electoral competitiveness as the gubernatorial election was very close before having its results partially overturned in favour of APC nominee Uzodinma while the PDP won a majority in the House of Assembly. The AA, APC, and PDP split the House of Representatives seats while the state was easily won by PDP presidential nominee Atiku Abubakar.

After their belated inauguration, Okorocha and Uwajumogu were noted as two of the few APC senators from the South East. Uwajumogu died in December 2019 leading to a prolonged political and legal battle to succeed him that eventually resulted in Chukwuma Frank Ibezim (APC) becoming senator in 2021. By 2022, Okorocha unsuccessfully ran for president while Onyewuchi defected to the LP.

== Overview ==
Affiliation	Party			Total
Affiliation	APC	PDP	LP	Total
Previous Election	2	1	0	3
Before Election	2	0	1	3
After Election	TBD	TBD	1	3

== Summary ==
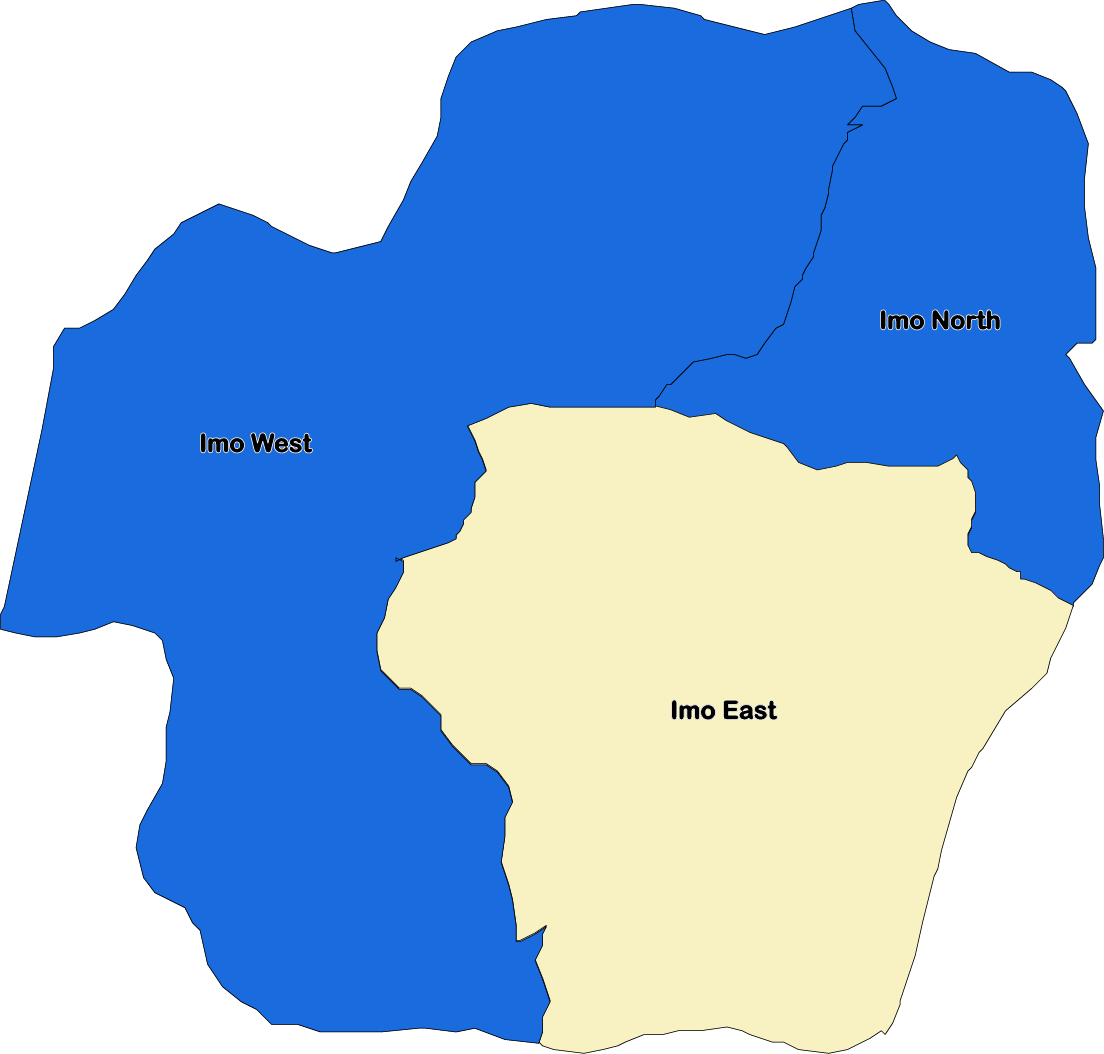
APC incumbent retiring or lost renomination LP incumbent running

District	Incumbent		Results	
District	Incumbent	Party	Status	Candidates
Imo East	Ezenwa Francis Onyewuchi	LP (Note: This senator was elected as a member of the PDP but switched to the LP during their term.)	Incumbent lost renomination (Note: Senator defected to new party after withdrawing from or losing their former party's primary.); Incumbent re-elected under nomination of new party LP gain	▌Alex Mbata (APC); ▌ ✓ Ezenwa Francis Onyewuchi (LP); ▌Uche Onyegucha (PDP)
Imo North	Chukwuma Frank Ibezim	APC	Incumbent lost renomination New member elected APC hold	▌ ✓ Patrick Ndubueze (APC); ▌Emmanuel Okewulonu (PDP)
Imo West	Rochas Okorocha	APC	Incumbent retired New member elected APC hold	▌ ✓ Osita Izunaso (APC)

== Imo East ==
2023 Imo East Senatorial District election
- 25 February 2023
Nominee	Alex Mbata	Ezenwa Francis Onyewuchi	Uche Onyegucha
Party	APC	LP	PDP
Senator before election
Ezenwa Francis Onyewuchi
LP
Elected Senator
TBD

The Imo East Senatorial District covers the local government areas of Aboh Mbaise, Ahiazu Mbaise, Ezinihitte Mbaise, Ikeduru, Mbaitoli, Ngor Okpala, Owerri Municipal, and Owerri West. The district is centred around the city of Owerri and is sometimes referred to as the "Owerri Zone." The incumbent Ezenwa Francis Onyewuchi (LP) was re-elected with 68.8% of the vote in 2019 as a member of the PDP; he initially sought renomination in the PDP but lost the primary before defecting to win the LP nomination in June 2022.

=== Primary elections ===
==== All Progressives Congress ====
On 20 April 2022, the APC National Executive Committee announced the party's schedule for senatorial primaries, setting its expression of interest form price at ₦3 million and nomination form price at ₦17 million with a 50% discount for candidates younger than 40 while women and candidates with disabilities get free nomination forms. Forms were to be sold from 26 April to 6 May until the deadline was later extended to 10 May then 12 May. After the submission of nomination forms by 13 May, candidates were screened by a party committee on 14 and 15 May while 18 May was the date for the screening appeal process. Ward congresses and LGA congresses were set for 16 and 17 May to elect delegates for the primary. Candidates approved by the screening process advanced to a primary set for 27 May, in concurrence with other APC senatorial primaries; challenges to the result could be made on 28 May.

Before the primary, pundits noted three major candidates: businessman Jerry Chukwueke, businessman Alex Mbata, and Ondo State First Lady Betty Anyanwu-Akeredolu. On 28 May, the primary was disrupted by thugs who forced Anyanwu-Akeredolu to flee the venue. After the escape, Anyanwu-Akeredolu told the party that "any result coming from this kangaroo election...should be rejected" and claimed that Governor Hope Uzodinma had hijacked the primary but when the primary process continued, she withdrew in protest in a letter saying "the circumstances that have shrouded events preceding this primary have proven to be far from [my] ideals." The primary was won by Mbata, who allegedly had the support of Uzodinma, with a 87% margin. In a post-primary statement, Mbata attempted to reach out to his former opponents but both Anyanwu-Akeredolu and Kemdi Opara rejected the primary.

APC primary results
Party	Candidate	Votes	%
APC	Alex Mbata	425	91.59%
APC	Betty Anyanwu-Akeredolu (withdrawn)	21	4.53%
APC	Jerry Chukwueke	14	3.02%
APC	Kemdi Opara	3	0.65%
APC	Lucy Uloaku Oguzie	1	0.21%
APC	Hillary Nwachukwu	0	0.00%
Total votes		464	100.00%

==== People's Democratic Party ====
On 16 March 2022, the national PDP announced its senatorial primary timetable, setting its expression of interest form price at ₦1 million and the nomination form price at ₦20 million with a 50% discount for candidates between 25 and 30. Forms were to be sold until 1 April but the party later extended the deadline four times before reaching a final deadline of 22 April. After the submission of nomination forms by 25 April, candidates were screened by a party committee on 27 April while 2 May was the rescheduled date for the screening appeal process. Ward congresses were set for 29 April and LGA congresses were rescheduled for 10 May to elect delegates for the primary. Candidates approved by the screening process advanced to a primary set for 23 May, in concurrence with other PDP senatorial primaries but due to often violently enforced Monday stay-at-home orders by separatists, southeastern state parties held their primaries on 24 May; challenges to the result could be made on 25 May.

Before the primary, pundits noted three major candidates: incumbent Onyewuchi, former House of Representatives member and former Secretary to the State Government Uche Onyeagocha, and businessman Basil Maduka. The indirect primary was held at The Mall Aladinma in Owerri and resulted in Onyeagocha defeating Onyewuchi by an 8% margin. Onyewuchi promptly left the PDP to obtain the LP senatorial nomination.

PDP primary results
Party	Candidate	Votes	%
PDP	Uche Onyeagocha	134	43.51%
PDP	Ezenwa Francis Onyewuchi	110	35.71%
PDP	Basil Maduka	64	20.78%
Total votes		308	100.00%

=== Campaign ===
As the general election campaign began, observers noted controversies with Onyewuchi's sudden LP nomination and Mbata's fraud scandal while also focusing on the infighting within both the state APC and PDP. As the election neared in February, some pundits gave the advantage to Onyewuchi due to his incumbency and the coattail effect of LP presidential nominee Peter Obi. In the same piece, APGA nominee Chyma Anthony was dismissed as a major contender due to his party's dwindling popularity in the state while Onyegucha's campaign was notably hurt by continued PDP infighting and Mbata was benefited by growing APC popularity.

=== General election ===
==== Results ====
2023 Imo East Senatorial District election
Party	Candidate	Votes	%
A	Michael Chiaka Nwachukwu		
AA	Osondu Ogueri Darlington Opara		
APP	Christian Kelechi Njemanze		
ADC	Chijioke Julian Valentine Odaghara		
APC	Alex Mbata		
APGA	Chyma Anthony		
APM	Obinna Valentine Emeto		
BP	Godwin Iwuanyanwu		
LP	Ezenwa Francis Onyewuchi		
NRM	Mike Kekechi Eze		
New Nigeria Peoples Party	Chioma Augusta Onyeneho		
PDP	Uche Onyegucha		
SDP	John Okechukwu Ucheoma		
YPP	Jonathan Onyemauchechukwu Okere		
ZLP	Chukwuemeka Samuel Osuji		
Total votes			100.00%
Invalid or blank votes			N/A
Turnout			

== Imo North ==
2023 Imo North Senatorial District election
- 25 February 2023
Nominee	Patrick Ndubueze	Ifeanyi Ararume Jr.	Emmanuel Okewulonu
Party	APC	LP	PDP
Senator before election
Chukwuma Frank Ibezim
APC
Elected Senator
TBD

The Imo North Senatorial District covers the local government areas of Ehime Mbano, Ihitte/Uboma, Isiala Mbano, Obowo, Okigwe, and Onuimo. The district is centred around the city of Okigwe and is sometimes referred to as the "Okigwe Zone." In 2019, Benjamin Uwajumogu (APC) was re-elected to the seat. Uwajumogu died in December 2019, leading to a by-election in December 2020. Although the APC won the by-election, a dispute over the legitimate APC primary victor between Chukwuma Frank Ibezim and Ifeanyi Ararume delayed the inauguration; Ibezim won the court cases and took office late in April 2021. Ibezim sought re-election but lost renomination.

=== Primary elections ===
==== All Progressives Congress ====
On 20 April 2022, the APC National Executive Committee announced the party's schedule for senatorial primaries, setting its expression of interest form price at ₦3 million and nomination form price at ₦17 million with a 50% discount for candidates younger than 40 while women and candidates with disabilities get free nomination forms. Forms were to be sold from 26 April to 6 May until the deadline was later extended to 10 May then 12 May. After the submission of nomination forms by 13 May, candidates were screened by a party committee on 14 and 15 May while 18 May was the date for the screening appeal process. Ward congresses and LGA congresses were set for 16 and 17 May to elect delegates for the primary. Candidates approved by the screening process advanced to a primary set for 27 May, in concurrence with other APC senatorial primaries; challenges to the result could be made on 28 May.

Before the primary, there were four major candidates: Ibezim, former MHR Patrick Ndubueze, former Governor Ikedi Ohakim, and former MHR Matthew Omegara; however, Ohakim and Omegara withdrew a few days before the primary. Ndubueze won the nomination.

==== People's Democratic Party ====
On 16 March 2022, the national PDP announced its senatorial primary timetable, setting its expression of interest form price at ₦1 million and the nomination form price at ₦20 million with a 50% discount for candidates between 25 and 30. Forms were to be sold until 1 April but the party later extended the deadline four times before reaching a final deadline of 22 April. After the submission of nomination forms by 25 April, candidates were screened by a party committee on 27 April while 2 May was the rescheduled date for the screening appeal process. Ward congresses were set for 29 April and LGA congresses were rescheduled for 10 May to elect delegates for the primary. Candidates approved by the screening process advanced to a primary set for 23 May, in concurrence with other PDP senatorial primaries but due to often violently enforced Monday stay-at-home orders by separatists, southeastern state parties held their primaries on 24 May; challenges to the result could be made on 25 May.

Before the primary, pundits noted two major candidates: Ifeanyi Ararume Jr. (former commissioner and son of Senator Ifeanyi Ararume) and 2020 by-election nominee Emmanuel Okewulonu. On the primary date, candidates contested an indirect primary that ended with Okewulonu emerging as the nominee after results showed him defeating Ararume Jr. by a 37% margin.

PDP primary results
Party	Candidate	Votes	%
PDP	Emmanuel Okewulonu	132	68.04%
PDP	Ifeanyi Ararume Jr.	61	31.44%
PDP	Nwachukwu Ugochukwu	1	0.52%
Total votes		194	100.00%

=== Campaign ===
Campaign analysis in February noted the competitiveness of the election and the potential coattail effect of LP presidential nominee Peter Obi that could benefit LP nominee Ifeanyi Ararume Jr.

=== General election ===
==== Results ====
2023 Imo North Senatorial District election
Party	Candidate	Votes	%
AA	Louis Uche Anyanwu		
APP	Ernest Ndidi Ezirim		
ADC	Amarachi Justina Ehiogu		
APC	Patrick Ndubueze		
APGA	Uchenna Henry Okike		
APM	Jorge Nkwoh		
BP	Eugen Alaoma Aligwekwe		
LP	Ifeanyi Ararume Jr.		
NRM	Assumpta Ifeoma Ofoeze		
New Nigeria Peoples Party	Rufus Amaefule		
PDP	Emmanuel Okewulonu		
SDP	Egbomuche Chijioke Nwoke		
YPP	Anthony Okwudiri C. Odu		
ZLP	Uchechukwu Stephen Okolorie		
Total votes			100.00%
Invalid or blank votes			N/A
Turnout			

== Imo West ==
2023 Imo West Senatorial District election
- 25 February 2023
Nominee	Osita Izunaso	Charles Ugochukwu Ahize
Party	APC	LP
Senator before election
Rochas Okorocha
APC
Elected Senator
TBD

The Imo West Senatorial District covers the local government areas of Ideato North, Ideato South, Isu, Njaba, Nwangele, Nkwerre, Oguta, Ohaji/Egbema, Orlu, Orsu, Oru East, and Oru West. The district is centred around the city of Orlu and is sometimes referred to as the "Orlu Zone." Incumbent Rochas Okorocha (APC) was elected with 47.6% of the vote in 2019. In January 2022, Okorocha announced that he would run for president instead of seeking re-election; Okorocha came joint-last in the APC primary.

=== Primary elections ===
==== All Progressives Congress ====
On 20 April 2022, the APC National Executive Committee announced the party's schedule for senatorial primaries, setting its expression of interest form price at ₦3 million and nomination form price at ₦17 million with a 50% discount for candidates younger than 40 while women and candidates with disabilities get free nomination forms. Forms were to be sold from 26 April to 6 May until the deadline was later extended to 10 May then 12 May. After the submission of nomination forms by 13 May, candidates were screened by a party committee on 14 and 15 May while 18 May was the date for the screening appeal process. Ward congresses and LGA congresses were set for 16 and 17 May to elect delegates for the primary. Candidates approved by the screening process advanced to a primary set for 27 May, in concurrence with other APC senatorial primaries; challenges to the result could be made on 28 May.

Before the primary, there were two major candidates: Goodluck Nanah Opiah (former House of Representatives member for Oguta/Ohaji/Egbema/Oru West) and Osita Izunaso (former Senator); however, Opiah dropped out just before the primary. On the primary date, Izunaso was nominated in a landslide over former MHR Greg Mbadiwe.

APC primary results
Party	Candidate	Votes	%
APC	Osita Izunaso	589	93.49%
APC	Greg Mbadiwe	41	6.51%
Total votes		630	100.00%

==== People's Democratic Party ====
On 16 March 2022, the national PDP announced its senatorial primary timetable, setting its expression of interest form price at ₦1 million and the nomination form price at ₦20 million with a 50% discount for candidates between 25 and 30. Forms were to be sold until 1 April but the party later extended the deadline four times before reaching a final deadline of 22 April. After the submission of nomination forms by 25 April, candidates were screened by a party committee on 27 April while 2 May was the rescheduled date for the screening appeal process. Ward congresses were set for 29 April and LGA congresses were rescheduled for 10 May to elect delegates for the primary. Candidates approved by the screening process advanced to a primary set for 23 May, in concurrence with other PDP senatorial primaries but due to often violently enforced Monday stay-at-home orders by separatists, southeastern state parties held their primaries on 24 May; challenges to the result could be made on 25 May.

Before the primary, pundits noted three major candidates: Jerry Alagbaoso (House of Representatives member for Oru East/Orsu/Orlu), ThankGod Ezeani (former House of Representatives member for Ideato North/Ideato South), and Jones Onyereri (former House of Representatives member for Isu/Njaba/Nkwerre/Nwangele). In the primary, Onyereri defeated runner-up Ezeani by 27%. However, the primary was challenged up to the Supreme Court, which nullified the exercise in January 2023. The judgement, based on the primary taking place in Owerri instead of a location inside the district, also barred the PDP from fielding a nominee. In response, the PDP claimed it had informed INEC of the changed location and vowed to find a path to the ballot.

Invalid primary results

PDP primary results
Party	Candidate	Votes	%
PDP	Jones Onyereri	228	56.58%
PDP	ThankGod Ezeani	118	29.28%
PDP	Jerry Alagbaoso	57	14.14%
Total votes		403	100.00%

=== Campaign ===
Originally a competitive race between Izunaso (APC), Onyereri (PDP), and Charles Ugochukwu Ahize (LP); the court ruling removing Onyereri as legitimate nominee greatly impacted the election. Although some pundits began to write that Izunaso was now favoured to win the seat, other observers noted that some PDP figures and Orlu community leaders had thrown their support behind Ahize.

=== General election ===
==== Results ====
2023 Imo West Senatorial District election
Party	Candidate	Votes	%
AA	Emeka Uzomah		
ADC	Alphonsus Obiajulu		
APC	Osita Izunaso		
APGA	Patrick Anayo Azumma		
APM	Akubueze Ikechuckwu Kingdom Akubueze		
BP	Emmanuel Osin Uwe		
LP	Charles Ugochukwu Ahize		
NRM	Stephen Amaechi Uwaezuoke		
New Nigeria Peoples Party	Paul Aballa		
PRP	Uchechukwu Ernest Ishiodu		
PDP	N/A		
SDP	Austin Kalu Egwuagu		
YPP	Cyril Chukwudi Opurum		
ZLP	Joseph Chudi Nnanna		
Total votes			100.00%
Invalid or blank votes			N/A
Turnout			

== See also ==
- 2023 Nigerian Senate election
- 2023 Nigerian elections
