= Nigerian National Assembly delegation from Imo =

Imo's delegation in Nigeria's National Assembly

The Nigerian National Assembly delegation from Imo comprises three Senators representing Imo North, Imo East, and Imo West, and ten Representatives representing Ahiazu Mbaise/Ezinihitte, Orlu/Oru East, Aboh Mbaise/Ngor Okpala, Ohaji/Egbema/Oguta, Ideato North/Ideato South, Okigwe North, Ehime Mbano/Ihitte Uboma/Obowo, Mbaitolu/Ikeduru, Owerri Municipal/Owerri North/Owerri West, and Nkwerre/Nwangele/Isu/Njaba.

== Fourth Republic ==
=== The 9th Parliament (2019–2023) ===
OFFICE	NAME	PARTY	CONSTITUENCY	TERM
Senator	Frank Ibezim	APC	Imo North	2019–2023
Senator	Onyewuchi Francis Ezenwa	PDP	Imo East	2019–2023
Senator	Rochas Okorocha	APC	Imo West	2019–2023
Representative			Ahiazu Mbaise/Ezinihitte	2019–2023
Representative	Chigozie Nwaneri	APC	Orlu/Oru East/Orsu	2019–2023
Representative	Matthew Nwogu	Labour Party (Nigeria)	Aboh Mbaise/Ngor Okpala	2019–2023
Representative			Oguta/Ohaji-Egbema/Oru West	2019–2023
Representative		Ikenga Ugochinyere	Ideato North/South	2019–2023
Representative			Isiala Mbano/Okigwe/Onuimo	2019–2023
Representative			Ehime Mbano/Ihitte Uboma/Obowo	2019–2023
Representative			Mbaitolu/Ikeduru	2019–2023
Representative	Ikenna ELZIEANYA	PDP	Owerri Municipal/Owerri North/West	2019–2023
Representative			Nwangele/Isu/Njaba/Nkwerre	2019–2023

=== The 8th Parliament (2015–2019) ===
OFFICE	NAME	PARTY	CONSTITUENCY	TERM
Senator	Benjamin Uwajumogu	APC	Imo North	2015–2019
Senator	Samuel Anyanwu	PDP	Imo East	2015–2019
Senator	Hope Uzodinma	APC	Imo West	2015–2019
Representative	Igbokwe Nnanna R.	PDP	Ahiazu Mbaise/Ezinihitte	2015–2019
Representative	Alagboso Jerry	PDP	Orlu/Oru East/Orsu	2015–2019
Representative	Bede Eke	PDP	Aboh Mbaise/Ngor Okpala	2015–2019
Representative	Goodluck Opiah	PDP	Oguta/Ohaji-Egbema/Oru West	2015–2019
Representative	Chukwukere Austin	APC	Ideato North/South	2015–2019
Representative	Obinna Onwubariri	PDP	Isiala Mbano/Okigwe/Onuimo	2015–2019
Representative	Okafor Chike.	APC	Ehime Mbano/Ihitte Uboma/Obowo	2015–2019
Representative	Henry Nwawuba	PDP	Mbaitolu/Ikeduru	2015–2019
Representative	Onyewuchi Francis	APGA	Owerri Municipal/Owerri North/West	2015–2019
Representative	Onyereri Jones	PDP	Nwangele/Isu/Njaba/Nkwerre	2015–2019

=== The 7th Parliament (2011–2015) ===
OFFICE	NAME	PARTY	CONSTITUENCY	TERM
Senator	Matthew Nwagwu	PDP	Imo North	2011–2015
Senator	Chris Anyanwu	PDP	Imo East	2011–2015
Senator	Hope Uzodinma	PDP	Imo West	2011–2015
Representative	Igbokwe Nnanna	PDP	Ahiazu Mbaise/Ezinihitte	2011–2015
Representative	Alagboso Jerry	PDP	Orlu/Oru East/Orsu	2011–2015
Representative	Emeka Ihedioha.	PDP	Aboh Mbaise/Ngor Okpala	2011–2015
Representative	Alphonsus Gerald	PDP	Ohaji/Egbema	2011–2015
Representative	Ifeanyichukwu Mbadiwe	PDP	Ideato North/South	2011–2015
Representative	Matthew Omegara	PDP	Isiala Mbano/Okigwe/Onuimo	2011–2015
Representative	Uwazurike Patrick.	PDP	Ehime Mbano/Ihitte Uboma/Obowo	2011–2015
Representative	Amadi Nnaemeka	PDP	Mbaitolu/Ikeduru	2011–2015
Representative	Onyewuchi Francis	PDP	Owerri Municipal/Owerri North/West	2011–2015
Representative	Onyereri Jones	PDP	Nwangele/Isu/Njaba/Nkwerre	2011–2015

=== The 6th Assembly (2007–2011) ===
OFFICE	NAME	PARTY	CONSTITUENCY	TERM
Senator	Sylvester Anyanwu	PDP	Imo North	2003–2007
Senator	Chris Anyanwu	PDP	Imo East	2003–2007
Senator	Osita Izunaso	PDP	Imo West	2003–2007
Representative	XXX {replace with Name}	PDP	Ahiazu/Ezinihitte Mbaise	2003–2007
Representative	XXX {replace with Name}	PDP	Orlu/Oru East/Orsu	2003–2007
Representative	XXX {replace with Name}	PDP	Aboh Mbaise/Ngor Okpala	2003–2007
Representative	Ama-Nwauwa Chika	ANPP	Ohaji/Egbema	2003–2007
Representative	XXX {replace with Name}	PDP	Ideato North/South	2003–2007
Representative	XXX {replace with Name}	PDP	Isiala Mbano/Okigwe/Onuimo	2003–2007
Representative	Austin Nwachukwu	PDP	Ehime Mbano/Ihitte Uboma/Obowo	2003–2007
Representative	Amadi Nnaemeka	PDP	Mbaitolu/Ikeduru	2003–2007
Representative	XXX {replace with Name}	PDP	Owerri Municipal/Owerri North/West	2003–2007
Representative	XXX {replace with Name}	PDP	Nwangele/Isu/Njaba/Nkwerre	2003–2007

=== The 5th Assembly (2003–2007) ===
OFFICE	NAME	PARTY	CONSTITUENCY	TERM
Senator	Godwin Araraume	PDP	Imo North	2003–2007
Senator	Amah Iwuagwu	PDP	Imo East	2003–2007
Senator	Arthur Nzeribe	PDP	Imo West	2003–2007
Representative	XXX {replace with Name}	PDP	Ahiazu/Ezinihitte Mbaise	2003–2007
Representative	XXX {replace with Name}	PDP	Orlu/Oru East/Orsu	2003–2007
Representative	XXX {replace with Name}	PDP	Aboh Mbaise/Ngor Okpala	2003–2007
Representative	XXX {replace with Name}	ANPP	Ohaji/Egbema	2003–2007
Representative	XXX {replace with Name}	PDP	Ideato North/South	2003–2007
Representative	XXX {replace with Name}	PDP	Isiala Mbano/Okigwe/Onuimo	2003–2007
Representative	XXX {replace with Name}	PDP	Ehime Mbano/Ihitte Uboma/Obowo	2003–2007
Representative	XXX {replace with Name}	PDP	Mbaitolu/Ikeduru	2003–2007
Representative	XXX {replace with Name}	PDP	Owerri Municipal/Owerri North/West	2003–2007
Representative	XXX {replace with Name}	PDP	Nwangele/Isu/Njaba/Nkwerre	2003–2007

=== The 4th Parliament (1999–2003) ===
OFFICE	NAME	PARTY	CONSTITUENCY	TERM
Senator	Ifeanyi Ararume	PDP	Imo North	1999–2003
Senator	Evan Enwerem	PDP	Imo East	1999–2003
Senator	Arthur Nzeribe	ANPP	Imo West	1999–2003
Representative	Anyanwu Tony	PDP	Ahiazu Mbaise/Ezinihitte	1999–2003
Representative	Dike Cajethan O.	ANPP	Orlu/Oru East/Orsu	1999–2003
Representative	Egu Greg C.	ANPP	Aboh Mbaise/Ngor Okpala	1999–2003
Representative	Eze Okere Tony	ANPP	Ohaji/Egbema	1999–2003
Representative	Ezeani Nnamdi	PDP	Ideato North/South	1999–2003
Representative	Ibekwe MauriceObasi	PDP	Isiala Mbano/Okigwe/Onuimo	1999–2003
Representative	Nwajiuba Chukwuemeka U.	PDP	Ehime Mbano/Ihitte Uboma/Obowo	1999–2003
Representative	Nwole Uchenna	PDP	Mbaitolu/Ikeduru	1999–2003
Representative	Oguike Levi	PDP	Owerri Municipal/Owerri North/West	1999–2003
Representative	Christopher Chukwuemeka Osuala	ANPP	Nwangele/Isu/Njaba/Nkwerre	1999–2003
