= Anyanwu (surname) =

Origin
- Word/name: Southeast Nigeria
- Meaning: Eyes of the sun

Anyanwu is a common Igbo surname that means "eyes of the sun". Subsequently, Anyanwu is the name of the traditional sun goddess in parts of Igboland, hence its popularity as a surname.

Notable people with the surname include:

- Betty Anyanwu-Akeredolu (born 1953), Nigerian aquaculturist and first lady of Ondo State from 2017 to 2023
- Christiana Anyanwu (born 1951), Nigerian journalist, publisher, author, and politician
- Cyril Chukwuka Anyanwu (died 1999), Nigerian Anglican bishop
- Emmanuel Anyanwu (born 1991), Nigerian footballer
- Innocent Anyanwu (born 1982), Dutch professional boxer
- Lennox Anyanwu (born 2000), English professional rugby player
- Ngozi Anyanwu, Nigerian playwright and actress
- Noah Chidiebere Junior Anyanwu Ohio (born 2003), Dutch professional footballer
- Obinna Kelvin Anyanwu (born 1983), known by his stage name Waconzy, Nigerian singer, songwriter, record producer and philanthropist
- Philip Anyanwu Billing (born 1996), Danish footballer
- Samuel Anyanwu (born 1965), Nigerian business executive and politician
- Sylvester Anyanwu (born 1951), Nigerian politician
