= Ifeanyi =

- Gender: Unisex

Origin
- Language: Igbo
- Meaning: Nothing is impossible
- Region of origin: Igboland

Other names
- Variant form: Iheanyi

Ifeanyichukwu or Ifeanyinachukwu is a name of Igbo origin which means "nothing is impossible with God." The name is often shortened as Ifeanyi by most people. The letter 'f' is sometimes replaced with 'h' and is spelled as Iheanyichukwu or Iheanyi by some people with slightly different dialect but the meaning remains the same. Also notable is the fact that the name is given to male children at birth, but in some cases, female children also bear the name.

Nigeria

- Johnpaul Fwesh Ifeanyi= a politician and doctor and well known for his pharmaceutical work and industrial ≤

== Notable people ==
- Ifeanyi Allen (born 1994), English footballer
- Ifeanyi Ararume, elected Senator for the Imo North (Okigwe) constituency of Imo State, Nigeria
- Ifeanyi Chiejine (born 1983), Nigerian football striker
- Ifeanyi Chijindu, Nigerian-American author/writer, entrepreneur, artist, actress and screenwriter
- Ifeanyi Chukwu-Agah Benedict (1991–2024), Nigerian sex worker predominantly known as Abuja Area Mama, murdered in 2024
- Ifeanyi Edeh (born 1996), Nigerian professional footballer
- Ifeanyi Emeghara (born 1984), Nigerian football player
- Ifeanyi Eze Nigerian professional footballer
- Arthur Okowa Ifeanyi (born 1959), elected Senator for Delta North, in Delta State, Nigeria
- Dumaka Francis Ifeanyi (born 1989), Nigerian football player
- Edwin Ifeanyi (born 1972), former Cameroonian football player
- Israel Ifeanyi, former American Football defensive end
- Ifeanyi Menkiti (born 1940), a Nigerian poet, and philosophy professor at Wellesley College
- Ifeanyi Momah (born 1989), American football Tight End
- Matthew Ifeanyi Nwagwu, elected Senator for the Imo North constituency of Imo State, Nigeria
- Ifeanyi Ohalete (born 1979), former American football strong safety in National Football League
- Digger Ifeanyi Okonkwo (born 1977), former Maltese footballer of Igbo Nigerian origin
- Ifeanyi Frederick Onuigbo (born 1989), Nigerian footballer, currently playing as a striker
- Ifeanyi Onyilo (born 1990), Nigerian football player
- Ifeanyi Ubah
- Ifeanyi Uddin or Adokiye Amiesimaka (born 1956), Nigerian footballer
- Ifeanyi Udeze (born 1980), Nigerian football player
- Ifeanyi Festus Ezeli-Ndulue (born 1989), Nigerian National Basketball Association Player
