= 2019 Nigerian Senate elections in Imo State =

2019 Nigerian Senate election in Imo State

The 2019 Nigerian Senate election in Imo State was held on February 23, 2019, to elect members of the Nigerian Senate to represent Imo State. Rochas Okorocha representing Imo West and Frank Ibezim representing Imo North won on the platform of All Progressives Congress, while Onyewuchi Francis Ezenwa representing Imo East won on the platform of Peoples Democratic Party.

== Overview ==
Affiliation	Party		Total
Affiliation	PDP	APC	Total
Before Election	1	2	3
After Election	1	2	3

== Summary ==
District	Incumbent	Party	Elected Senator	Party
Imo West	Hope Uzodinma	APC	Rochas Okorocha	APC
Imo East	Samuel Anyanwu	PDP	Onyewuchi Francis Ezenwa	PDP
Imo North	Benjamin Uwajumogu	APC	Benjamin Uwajumogu	APC

== Results ==
=== Imo South ===
A total of 37 candidates registered with the Independent National Electoral Commission to contest in the election. APC candidate Rochas Okorocha won the election, defeating APC candidate Victor Onyerari and 35 other party candidates. Okorocha scored 92,622 votes, while PDP candidate, Onyerari scored 63,117 votes.

2019 Nigerian Senate election in Imo South
Party	Candidate	Votes	%
APC	Rochas Okorocha	92,622	47.60
PDP	Victor Onyerari	63,117	32.44
APGA	Osita Izunaso	30,923	15.89
Others			
Total votes		194,572	100%
APC hold			

=== Imo East ===
A total of 37 candidates registered with the Independent National Electoral Commission to contest in the election. PDP candidate Onyewuchi Francis Ezenwa won the election, defeating APC candidate Emmanuel Umunakwe and 35 other party candidates. Ezenwa pulled 146,647 votes, while APC candidate Umunakwe scored 33,729.

2019 Nigerian Senate election in Imo East
Party	Candidate	Votes	%
PDP	Onyewuchi Francis Ezenwa	188,526	68.81
APC	Emmanuel Umunakwe	33,729	15.83
APGA	Mike Nwachukwu	18,854	8.85
Others			
Total votes		213,113	100%
PDP hold			

=== Imo North ===
APC candidate Benjamin Uwajumogu won the election, defeating PDP candidate Hon. Patrick Ndubueze.

2019 Nigerian Senate election in Imo North
Party	Candidate	Votes	%
APC	Benjamin Uwajumogu		
PDP	Patrick Ndubueze		
Others			
Total votes			100%
APC hold			

== 2020 Bye election ==
A bye election was held on 5 December 2020 in the Imo North Senatorial District due to a vacancy following the demise of Benjamin Uwajumogu. Frank Ibezim of APC contested against Emmanuel Okewulonu of PDP and 12 other part candidates. They totalled 36,811 and 31,903 votes respectively. Ibezim was declared the winner by INEC.
