= 2007 Imo State gubernatorial election =

State election in Nigeria

- 14 April 2007
Nominee	Ikedi Ohakim	Ifeanyi Ararume
Party	PPA	PDP
Popular vote	749,800	309,273
Governor before election
Ikedi Ohakim
PPA
Elected Governor
Ikedi Ohakim
PPA

The 2007 Imo State gubernatorial election was the sixth gubernatorial election of Imo State. Held on 14 April 2011, the Progressive Peoples Alliance nominee Ikedi Ohakim won the election, defeating Ifeanyi Ararume of the People's Democratic Party.

== Results ==
A total of 16 candidates contested in the election. Ikedi Ohakim from the Progressive Peoples Alliance won the election, defeating Ifeanyi Ararume from the People's Democratic Party. Registered voters was 1,372,975.

2007 Imo State gubernatorial election
Party	Candidate	Votes	%	±%
PPA	Ikedi Ohakim	749,800		
PDP	Ifeanyi Ararume	309,273		
PPA hold				
