= Emma Ojinere =

Nigerian politician (1967–2020)

Chief Emmanuel Ojinere
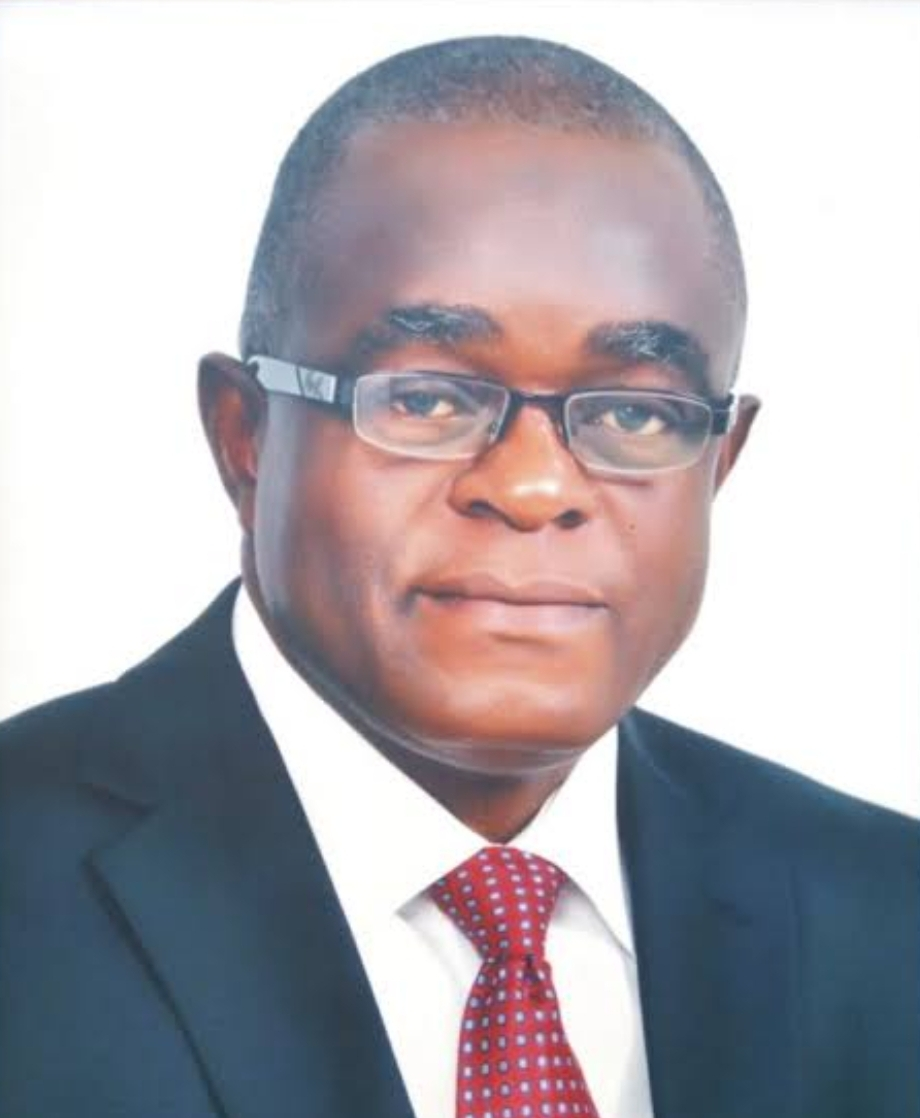

State Commissioner for Trade & Investment
- In office 4 December 2017 – 12 September 2018
- Governor: Rochas Okorocha

Personal details
- Born: Emmanuel Umunnakwe Ojinere; 1961 Owerri Division, Eastern Region (today in Ahiazu Mbaise, Imo State)
- Died: 18 January 2021 (aged 59–60)
- Party: All Progressive Congress
- Other political affiliations: Peoples Democratic Party (until 2017)
- Occupation: businessman; politician; engineer

Chief Emmanuel Umunnakwe Ojinere (1961–2021) was a Nigerian politician and businessman who served as Commissioner for Trade and Investment in Imo State under the administration of Governor Rochas Okorocha (2016-2018).

== Politics ==
Ojinere came into the limelight of Imo state politics in 2007, when he joined Imo State Governorship election under the party of the Peoples Democratic Party (PDP).

Ojinere joined All Progressive Congress (APC) in 2017, and was appointed State Commissioner for Trade and Investment by Governor Rochas Okorocha. A year later, his position was changed to Special Adviser on Small-scale Medium Enterprises, Ojinere was the APC candidate that contested in the Imo East senatorial seat in the 2019 elections.
