= Bashir Gwandu =

Nigerian Academia and Tech Expert

Dr Bashir Gwandu
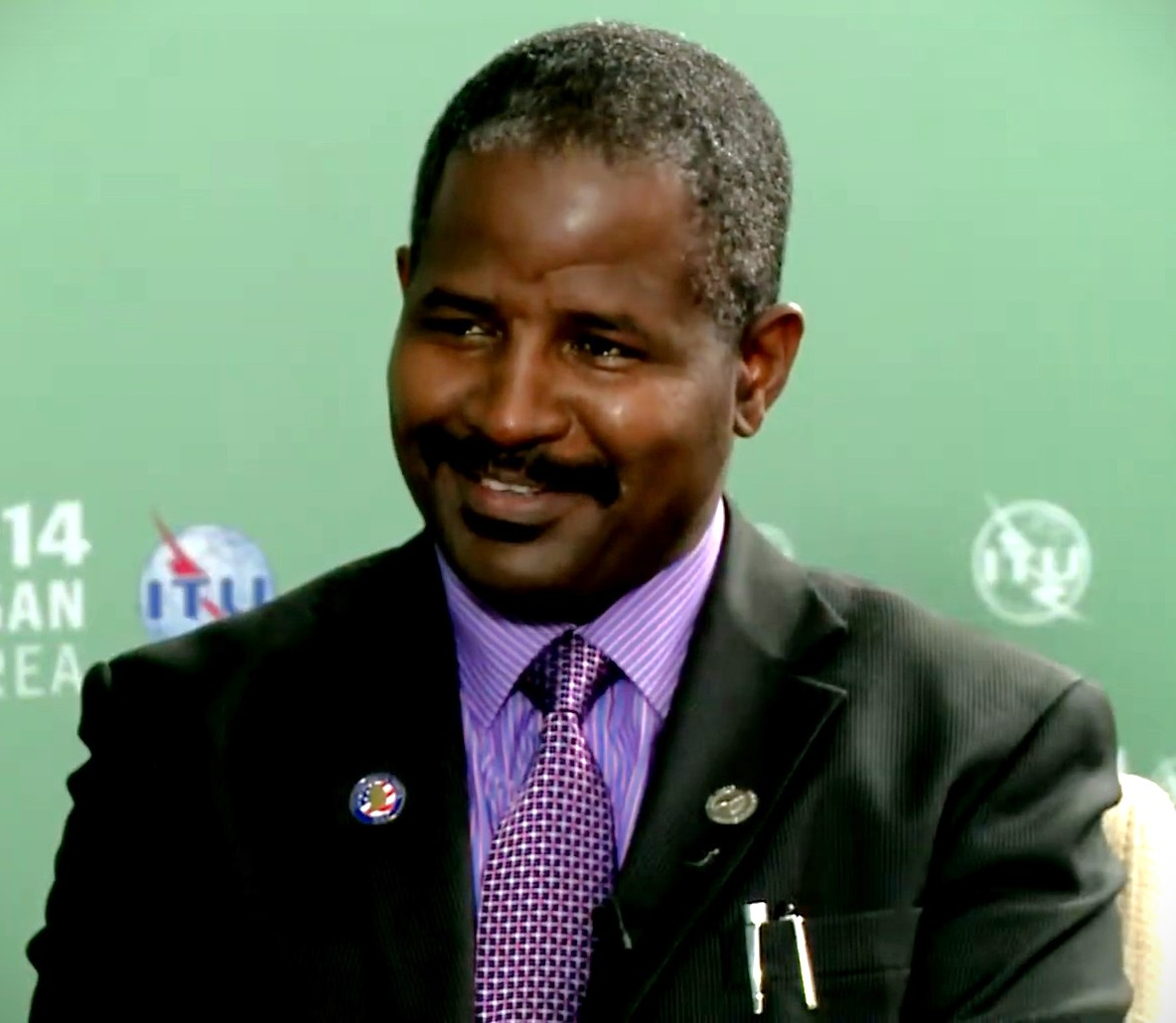
- Gwandu in 2014

Former EVC NASENI
- Preceded by: Mohammed Sani Haruna
- Succeeded by: Khalil Halilu

Personal details
- Born: Bashir Gwandu Kebbi

Bashir Gwandu is a Nigerian engineer, technologist, and the former Executive Vice Chairman (EVC) of the National Agency for Science and Engineering Infrastructure (NASENI). Gwandu assumed office as the EVC of NASENI in May 2023, after being appointed to the position by former President Muhammadu Buhari.

== Early life and education ==
Bashir Gwandu was born and raised in Kebbi State, Nigeria. He completed his higher education in the field of engineering, where he acquired expertise that later informed his work in scientific and technological research. Gwandu holds various academic qualifications in engineering and technology management.

== Career ==
=== Leadership at NASENI ===
Gwandu's career at NASENI spans over a significant period, culminating in his appointment as the Executive Vice Chairman (EVC) in May 2023. During this time, he has been instrumental in driving the agency's mandate to promote scientific research, technological innovation, and engineering infrastructure in Nigeria.

As the head of NASENI, Gwandu has worked on initiatives aimed at improving the technological landscape of Nigeria. His leadership is focused on reducing Nigeria's dependence on foreign technology and ensuring that the country becomes self-sufficient in critical areas such as renewable energy, engineering, and manufacturing. He was replaced by Khalil Halilu.

== Personal life ==
Details about Gwandu's personal life remain relatively private, though he is known to be deeply passionate about scientific development and technological innovation.
