= 2007 Nigerian Senate elections in Imo State =

The 2007 Nigerian Senate election in Imo State was held on 21 April 2007, to elect members of the Nigerian Senate to represent Imo State. Chris Anyanwu representing Imo East, Osita Izunaso representing Imo West and Sylvester Anyanwu representing Imo North all won on the platform of the People's Democratic Party.

== Overview ==
Affiliation	Party		Total
Affiliation	AC	PDP	Total
Before Election			3
After Election	0	3	3

== Summary ==
District	Incumbent	Party	Elected Senator	Party
Imo East			Chris Anyanwu	PDP
Imo West			Osita Izunaso	PDP
Imo North			Sylvester Anyanwu	PDP

== Results ==
=== Imo East ===
The election was won by Chris Anyanwu of the Peoples Democratic Party (Nigeria).

2007 Nigerian Senate election in Imo State
Party	Candidate	Votes	%
PDP	Chris Anyanwu		
Total votes			
PDP hold			

=== Imo West ===
The election was won by Osita Izunaso of the Peoples Democratic Party (Nigeria).

2007 Nigerian Senate election in Imo State
Party	Candidate	Votes	%
PDP	Osita Izunaso		
Total votes			
PDP hold			

=== Imo North ===
The election was won by Sylvester Anyanwu of the Peoples Democratic Party (Nigeria).

2007 Nigerian Senate election in Imo State
Party	Candidate	Votes	%
PDP	Sylvester Anyanwu		
Total votes			
PDP hold			
