= Khalil Halilu =

Nigerian business and tech expert (born 1990)

Khalil Halilu EVC/CEO
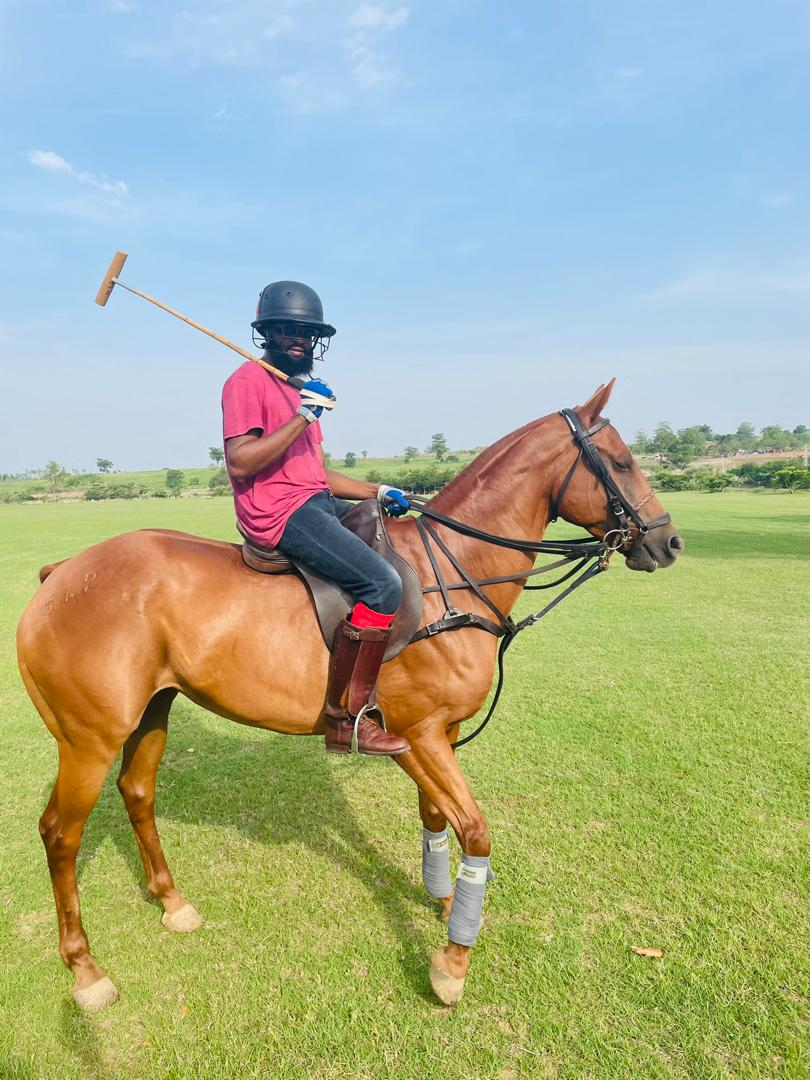

Chief Executive Officer of the National Agency for Science and Engineering Infrastructure
- Incumbent
- Assumed office 1 September 2023
- President: Bola Tinubu
- Preceded by: Bashir Gwandu

Personal details
- Born: Khalil Suleiman Halilu; 29 October 1990 (age 35) Kano
- Party: APC
- Website: https://khalilhalilu.com

Khalil Halilu (born 29 October 1990) is a Nigerian business and tech expert, entrepreneur and the current executive vice chairman and chief executive officer of the National Agency for Science and Engineering Infrastructure NASENI. He was appointed to this position by President Bola Tinubu on 1 September 2023.

== Early life and education ==
Halilu was born in Kano City, Kano state. He attended Rainbow Primary School in Kano from 1996 to 2001. He completed his secondary school education at St. Thomas Catholic School in 2003 and Prime College in Kano in 2006. Halilu then enrolled at the University of Hertfordshire in the United Kingdom, where he obtained his bachelor of science degree in Business Administration in 2009, followed by a master degree in International Business in 2010.

== Career ==
After graduating from university, Halilu worked as an administrative clerk at Archimode & Associates. He then completed his National Youth Service Corps in Abuja.

At the age of 23, Halilu founded and co-founded several ventures including ShapShap, an on-demand delivery app, and the CANs park in Abuja, an eco-friendly tech hub.. Halilu is currently on the board of directors of Gongoni Company Limited and Scirrocco International Limited, where he served as chief operating officer (COO) from 2010.

Throughout his career, Halilu has held positions such as managing director at Khash Strategic Services Ltd. in 2014, Operations Manager at ZCET Global Meter Services Ltd. in 2017, and creative director and business developer at Africa Infotech Consultancy in 2015. He also started KSH Construction & Design Ltd. in 2014 and CWCD Africa in 2018.

== Personal life ==
Khalil Halilu is a Nigerian national and currently resides in Abuja. He is known by the nickname "KSH" and has a passion for polo.
