= Okohia =

Town in Imo State, Nigeria

Coordinates: 5°13′8″N 6°55′4″E

Okohia is a community in the Isiala Mbano Local Government Area of Imo State, Nigeria, at an altitude of about 211 m.

Okohia lies on the Imo River, a tributary of the Niger River, which creates a natural coastline of sandy beaches, mangrove swamps, lagoons and coastal hills. The official language is Igbo. The majority of the population are Christians, while others follow traditional beliefs.

At the time of the Nigerian Civil War, Okohia was part of Okigwe Division. The Administrator was Col. Samuel Onunaka Mbakwe, who later become the first democratic Governor of Imo State. Okohia is the birthplace of Ikedi Ohakim, who became governor of Imo State in May 2007.
