= Adanna Steinacker =

Nigerian doctor and influencer

- Born: Adanna Ohakim; 2 March 1988 (age 38); Imo State, Nigeria
- Education: University of East Anglia; Royal College of Surgeons in Ireland
- Occupations: Doctor, entrepreneur
- Spouse: David Steinacker (m. 2013)
- Children: 3
- Father: Ikedi Ohakim

Adanna Steinacker (born 2 March 1988) is a Nigerian medical doctor, influencer, and an advocate of women's empowerment. She has served as the senior special assistant to Bola Tinubu on Women's Health since 2025. Her purpose-driven brand "House of Adanna", a creative community platform that empowers women, produces engaging content around the topics of health, well-being, sustainability, motherhood, and equality, including Sustainable Development Goals SDG 5 and SDG 3. House of Adanna's online community counts over 1 million people combined. Adanna is married to her university sweetheart David Steinacker, a German business consultant, and they have three children together.

== Early life and education ==
Adanna Steinacker was born on 2 March 1988. A native of Imo State, she is among the five children of Ikedi Ohakim and Chioma Ohakim. She had her BSc in Biomedicine from the University of East Anglia in 2010 and medical degrees (MB, Bch, BAO, LRCP and SI) from The Royal College of Surgeons in Ireland (RCSI) in 2015.

While at the university, she met David Steinacker, a fellow student from Germany, who began working as a business consultant in the technology sector in 2012. A few years into their relationship, the couple celebrated three wedding ceremonies, a traditional Igbo Igbankwu in Nigeria in December 2013, a German court wedding in March 2014, and a church ceremony in Dublin, Ireland, in July 2014. Videos of their wedding went viral and have amassed over 2.8 million views. They have three children, two sons and a daughter.

== Work ==
In October 2017, Steinacker founded and became the CEO of Medics Abroad, an international organisation providing logistics for clinical placements in Africa to medics around the world. Medics Abroad offered on-site rotations in Kenya, Ghana, Rwanda and South Africa, with plans to expand across the entire continent. In 2020, Medics Abroad was affected by the pandemic, just a year after transitioning fully from clinical practice to entrepreneurship.

Steinacker is a Digital influencer. She first gained international notability when a 15-second Instagram video of herself and her husband, dancing to Afrobeats music in their kitchen, went viral in 2014. In 2018, Steinacker and her husband were featured in the BBC Newsbeat documentary YouTube Couples: How to stay in love. She is the Co-Founder and content creator of Adanna David Digital Ltd., a digital consultancy. Through this company, she manages her social media platforms, which boast over half a million followers, and provides consulting services to brands on influencer marketing. Her client list includes prominent names such as L’Oréal, Dubai Tourism, KLM, Disney, and eBay.

She has been featured as the keynote speaker at various international conferences, including the annual meeting of the World Economic Forum, United Nations Climate Change conference, and the Goalkeepers Initiative by the Bill & Melinda Gates Foundation, focusing on women's empowerment, particularly around health, sustainability, equality, and SDG 3.

== Advocacy ==
A black African woman, Steinacker identifies as a feminist.
