= 2003 Nigerian Senate elections in Imo State =

2003 Nigerian Senate election in Imo State

The 2003 Nigerian Senate election in Imo State was held on April 12, 2003, to elect members of the Nigerian Senate to represent Imo State. Amah Iwuagwu representing Imo East, Ifeanyi Ararume representing Imo North and Arthur Nzeribe representing Imo West all won on the platform of the Peoples Democratic Party.

== Overview ==
Affiliation	Party		Total
Affiliation	PDP	AD	Total
Before Election			3
After Election	3	0	3

== Summary ==
District	Incumbent	Party	Elected Senator	Party
Imo East			Amah Iwuagwu	PDP
Imo North			Ifeanyi Ararume	PDP
Imo West			Arthur Nzeribe	PDP

== Results ==
=== Imo East ===
The election was won by Amah Iwuagwu of the Peoples Democratic Party.

2003 Nigerian Senate election in Imo State
Party	Candidate	Votes	%
PDP	Amah Iwuagwu		
Total votes			
PDP hold			

=== Imo North ===
The election was won by Ifeanyi Ararume of the Peoples Democratic Party.

2003 Nigerian Senate election in Imo State
Party	Candidate	Votes	%
PDP	Ifeanyi Ararume		
Total votes			
PDP hold			

=== Imo West ===
The election was won by Arthur Nzeribe of the Peoples Democratic Party.

2003 Nigerian Senate election in Imo State
Party	Candidate	Votes	%
PDP	Arthur Nzeribe		
Total votes			
PDP hold			
