= Olusegun Adewoye =

Nigerian academic (1947–2015)

- Born: 1947; Ilesa, Osun State, Nigeria
- Died: 2015 (aged 67–68); Abuja, FCT, Nigeria
- Education: Comprehensive High School, Aiyetoro, Nigeria; University of Manchester, Manchester
- Occupations: Director General and Chief Executive, National Agency for Science and Engineering Infrastructure (NASENI)

Olusegun O. Adewoye (1947–2015) was the director general and chief executive of the National Agency for Science and Engineering Infrastructure (NASENI), Abuja, Nigeria.

== Early life and education ==
Olusegun Oyeleke Adewoye (born 1947, Ilesa, Osun State, Nigeria; died 2015, Abuja, FCT, Nigeria) was a professor of Materials Science and Engineering of Yoruba Nigerian descent. He obtained a high school certificate from Comprehensive High School, Aiyetoro, Nigeria in 1968, and BSc degree in Metallurgy from University of Manchester, Manchester, England in 1973. In 1976, he obtained a PhD degree in Metallurgy and Materials Science from University of Cambridge, Cambridge, England. Professor Adewoye joined the Engineering Materials Development Institute (EMDI), Akure as director and chief executive. His work at this institute includes Foundry Technology Education Center, rotary furnaces, ceramic kiln, Austempered Ductile Iron Technology and Carbo-Nitriding Strengthening of Ferrous Alloy Surfaces. In 2003, he became the director general and chief executive of the National Agency for Science and Engineering Infrastructure (NASENI), which supervises seven research institutes. Adewoye has over 50 publications to his credit. His career development efforts covered Organic solar cells and Light-emitting diodes from Polymers, Nanotechnology and Advanced Materials, Advanced Manufacturing Technology (CAD/CAM). Adewoye established a number of linkage projects with overseas institutions. He was a Hearst Mining Research Fellow and visiting professor at University of California, Berkeley, Visiting Scientist at Princeton Materials Institute, Member Board of Execution, US/Africa Material Research Programme, Member African Materials Research Society and Project Coordinator Nigeria/UNESCO Project for the Reform and Revitalization of Nigeria's Science, Technology, Innovation System.

== Research activities ==
Adewoye initiated, conducted and supervised research in the broad subject areas of ceramic science and engineering, and physical metallurgy and corrosion engineering.

The results of his research have been published and utilized for industrial SME applications.

Some of his research areas included:

- Advanced Materials Research: Size Effect and Micro-Indentation in Liga Ni MEMS Structures
- Strengthening Surface of Ferrous Components using Cassava Waste
- The Elucidation of the Ionic and Corrosion of Construction Materials for Food Process Machines
- Development of Austempered Ductile Iron (ADI) from rotary melts
- Deformation and Fracture in Hexagonal Metallic and Ceramic Material
- Wear and Corrosion Studies.
- Assessment of clays and other aluminosilicates for industrial applications

== Professional organisations and honors ==
Professor Adewoye was a Registered Engineer (COREN) and member of many professional bodies including:

- Nigerian Academy of Science (fellow)
- Nigerian Academy of Engineering (fellow)
- Nigerian Society of Engineers (fellow)
- Royal Microscopical Society (fellow)
- Nigerian Institute of Physics
- British Institute of Ceramics
- Material Science and Technology Society of Nigeria (inaugural Fellow)

He was the recipient of several awards including:

- Western State of Nigerian Scholar (1970–1973)
- Prize Man, University of Manchester, England (1979)
- Federal Government of Nigeria Scholar (1973–1976)
- Visiting Scholar, California Institute of Mining
- Research Fellow University of California Berkeley
- Distinguished Scientist Award, Faculty of Science Obafemi Awolowo University (2004)
- Award of Excellence Nigerian Institute of Physics (2005)

== Education and academic post ==
Adewoye was a lecturer in Engineering Physics at University of Ife from 1976 to 1984. He was Senior Lecturer, Reader and Head of the Department of Metallurgical and Materials Engineering (MME) from 1984 to 1988. By 1989, he became a Professor of MME. He served in the following: University Senate (1982–1988); University Appointments and Promotions Committee (1984–1985); Departmental Post Graduate Committee (1983–1985); several faculty committees; University Space Planning Committee (1985–1988); and University Housing Allocation Committee (1985–1987). He was director, Central Technological Laboratory and Workshops (1992–1995); and dean, Student Affairs (1993–1995). He supervised many undergraduate and postgraduate students some of whom are now professors in universities, chief executives of government parastatals and captains of industry.

== Selected papers ==
- Structural Studies of Surface Deformation in MgO, SiC and Si_{3}N_{4}, 2002, with Sawyer, G. R.; Edington, J. W.; and Page, T. F.
- The effect of environment on the creep and stress rupture behaviour of Rene 95, 2004
- Metallographic Studies of Pack Cyanided Mild Steel Using Cassava Leaves, April 2008
- Anisotropic behaviour of etched hardness indentations, 2004
- Investigation of Hardness Anisotropy in Tourmaline with M. O. Adeoye
- Size Effects in the Nano and Microhardness of FCC Single Crystal Metals, Materials Science and Engineering with Z. Zong and J. Lou
- Knoop microhardness determination of the slip systems in beryl (Be_{3}Al_{2}(SiO_{3})_{6})
- Some aspects of the crystallography, flow and fracture of beryl (Be_{3}Al_{2}(SiO_{3})_{6})
