= Dumaka Francis Ifeanyi =

Nigerian footballer

Personal information
- Full name: Dumaka Francis Ifeanyi
- Date of birth: 3 August 1989 (age 37)
- Place of birth: Onitsha, Nigeria
- Height: 1.70 m (5 ft 7 in)
- Position: Forward

Team information
- Current team: Chumpon F.C.
- Number: 19

Senior career*
Years	Team	Apps	(Gls)
2009–2010	Okktha United F.C.	14	(-)
2010	FC Protege	12	(10)
2010–2012	Pattani F.C.	57	(17)
2013–	Ranong F.C.	6	(-)
2013–	Nara United F.C.	16	(12)
2014–	Khaleej Sirte S.C.	-	(3)
2014–2015	Chumpon Fc.	9	(3)
2023–	Yingsharoen FC	2	(1)
- * Club domestic league appearances and goals as of 6 August 2023 ‡ National team caps and goals as of 13 October 2008

Dumaka Francis (born 3 August 1989) is a Nigerian born Ugandan professional footballer who plays as a forward for Chumpon FC.

== Career ==
Francis played for Myanmar National League clubside Okkthar United FC.

He played with FC Protege in ESPZEN Sunday Division 1 of Singapore which was considered as the most competitive amateur football league during that period. He join Queen Cannon Langkasuka, Pattani FC of Thailand on 12 June 2010 at mid-season. Francis scored his first goal of the season with Pattani on 3 July 2010 against Surathani. He found the net in the 72nd minute as Pattani won the match 6–1. Francis scored again on 11 July 2010 against Phuket in which he scored in the 68th minute through a header. Francis scored his final goal of the season on 18 July 2010 against Chumpon FC in which he scored 10 minutes into the second half of the game at Surathani stadium. After a half season with Pattani, they renewed his contract in the summer of 2011. Francis scored 8 goals that season.

On 11 July 2012 Francis scored a winning goal against Osotspa Saraburi of Thai premier league to take his team to round of 16 in Thailand Toyota league cup.

His contract was extended into 2012 and his 6 goals helped Pattani to go to champions league in 2012.

Francis signed for southern Thailand team Ranong FC, popularly known as the Andaman Shark, where he was spotted by the samba of southern Thailand, Nara United in the second leg of the league. On 8 June 2013, Francis announced his arrival by assisting a goal to defeat Pattani. He scored his first goal in a (0 – 3) win over Yala FC. On 18 August 2013 he scored 2 goals and assisted 1 against Satun United. On 4 September 2013, Francis scored 4 goals in a (5 – 1) win over Narkon Si heritage to emerge as the top scorer of southern Thailand.

Nara United championed the 2013 season and Francis won the top score award with 10 goals after joining the team mid-season.

On 20 October 2013, Francis scored his first champion's league goal against Prachuap Kirikan at the 53rd minute in the second half to draw the game 1-1.

On 27 October 2013, Francis notched 2 goals against Phitsanulok TSY in the champion's league match scoring minutes 3 and 35 in a 3 – 1 win over TSY.

On 2 November 2013, Francis scored a lone goal to defeat Lookesan Kabin Thai in the champion's league tussle.

Francis scored his final champion's league goal on 8 December 2013 against Roiet United at minute 58 through a penalty shoot-out.

On 4 January 2014, Francis joined a Libyan premier side Khaleej Sirte SC. He played his first friendly match with Khaleej Sirte SC on 6 January 2014 against another Libyan premier side, Al-Tahaddi Benghazi, where he scored the only goal. On 13 January 2014 Francis signed a 6-month contract with Khaleej Sirte SC. Due to political unrest in Libya, Francis left the country for Chumpon F.C of Thailand.

On 6 August 2023, Francis announced his arrival to Yingcharoen FC by Scoring a goal in 2–2 draw against young boys FC in Bangkok Premier League.

== Career statistics ==
=== Club ===
Statistics accurate as of 1 February 2013

Club	Season	League			Cup			AFC			Total		
Club	Season	Apps	Goals	Assists	Apps	Goals	Assists	Apps	Goals	Assists	Apps	Goals	Assists
Okktha United F.C.	2009–10	14	-	9	-	-	0	0	0	0	14	-	9
Career total		14	-	9	-	-	0	0	0	0	14	-	9
FC Protege	2010–10	12	10	7	0	0	0	0	0	0	12	10	7
Career total		12	10	7	0	0	0	0	0	0	12	10	7
Pattani fc	2010–12	55	17	18	2	1	0	0	0	0	57	18	18
Career total		55	17	18	2	1	0	0	0	0	57	18	18
Ranong fc	2013-	5	0	0	1	0	0	0	0	0	6	0	
Career total		5	0	0	1	0	0	0	0	0	6	0	0
Nara United	2013-	16	12	7	0	0	0	0	0	0	16	12	7
Career total		16	12	7	0	0	0	0	0	0	16	12	7
Khaleej sirte Sc	2014-	-	-	-	-	-	-	-	-	-	-	-	-
Career total		-	-	-	-	-	-	-	-	-	-	-	-
Chumpon Fc	2014–2015	9	3	5	0	0	0	0	0	0	9	3	5
Career total		9	3	5	0	0	0	0	0	0	9	3	5
