= 2011 Nigerian Senate elections in Imo State =

2011 Nigerian Senate election in Imo State

The 2011 Nigerian Senate election in Imo State was held on April 9, 2011, to elect members of the Nigerian Senate to represent Imo State. Hope Uzodinma representing Imo West and Matthew Ifeanyi Nwagwu representing Imo North won on the platform of Peoples Democratic Party, while Christiana Anyanwu representing Imo East won on the platform of All Progressives Grand Alliance.

== Overview ==
Affiliation	Party		Total
Affiliation	PDP	APGA	Total
Before Election			3
After Election	2	1	3

== Summary ==
District	Incumbent	Party	Elected Senator	Party
Imo West			Hope Uzodinma	PDP
Imo North			Matthew Ifeanyi Nwagwu	PDP
Imo East			Christiana Anyanwu	APGA

== Results ==
=== Imo West ===
Peoples Democratic Party candidate Hope Uzodinma won the election, defeating other party candidates.

2011 Nigerian Senate election in Imo State
Party	Candidate	Votes	%
PDP	Hope Uzodinma		
Total votes			
PDP hold			

=== Imo North ===
Peoples Democratic Party candidate Matthew Ifeanyi Nwagwu won the election, defeating other party candidates.

2011 Nigerian Senate election in Imo State
Party	Candidate	Votes	%
PDP	Matthew Ifeanyi Nwagwu		
Total votes			
PDP hold			

=== Imo East ===
All Progressives Grand Alliance candidate Christiana Anyanwu won the election, defeating other party candidates.

2011 Nigerian Senate election in Imo State
Party	Candidate	Votes	%
APGA	Christiana Anyanwu		
Total votes			
APGA hold			
