= Akeredolu =

- Gender: Male
- Language: Yoruba

Origin
- Origin: Nigerian
- Meaning: One who becomes prominent at a young age
- Region of origin: South-west Nigeria

Akeredolu (Akeredolu) is a Nigerian surname of Yoruba origin with layered meanings, typically interpreted as "One who becomes prominent at a young age" or "He who humbles himself to become king." The name reflects qualities of early achievement or humility leading to greatness. It is derived from the components “a” (one who), “kéré” (to be small or young), “di” (become), and “Olú” (prominent one or king), forming the morphological structure a-kéré-di-olú.

Notable people with the surname include:

- Rotimi Akeredolu (1956–2023), Nigerian politician and lawyer
- Betty Anyanwu-Akeredolu (born 1953), Nigerian aquaculturist
- Olaolu Akeredolu-Ale, better known as Olaolu Slawn (born 2000), British-Nigerian designer and artist
