= Chigozie Nwaneri =

Nigerian politician

Chief Whip, Imo State House of Assembly
- Incumbent
- Assumed office 2023
- Constituency: Oru East

Personal details
- Born: 24 February 1977 (age 49)
- Citizenship: Nigeria
- Party: All Progressives Congress (APC)
- Education: Imo State University
- Occupation: Politician

Chigozie Nwaneri (born on 24 February 1977) is a Nigerian politician and lawmaker, currently serving as the Chief Whip, representing Oru East constituency in the Imo State House of Assembly.

== Early life and education ==
Chigozie Nwaneri was born on 24 February 1977. He attended Imo State University, Owerri.

== Political career ==
In the House of Assembly election held on 18 March 2023, Nwaneri was re-elected for a second consecutive term as a member of the All Progressives Congress (APC), defeating his opponents.

In the 2019 elections, he initially contested in the Imo House of Assembly elections to represent Oru East constituency under the Peoples Democratic Party (PDP) which he won and served as the Majority Leader. He has served as chairman, House Committee on Works, chairman Public Accounts, vice chairman Committee on Local Government and Chieftancy, Leader Orlu Caucus 9th House.

In his speech, Chigoze stated that

“From the pictures of some of our rivers taken some years back and now, show that our rivers are dying as a result of waste products deposited in it on daily basis”,

— NIGERIA WATCHDOG, Nwaneri’s Bill On Clean Water Supply In Imo For 2nd Reading

== Religion ==
Nwaneri is a Christian.

== Awards and honors ==
- Proactive Lawmaker of the Year Award by Arise Africa
- Defender of the Youths 2020 by Orluzurume Youth
