= Patrick Ndubueze =

Nigerian politician

Patrick Chukwuba Ndubueze is a Nigerian politician. He serves as the Senator representing Imo North Senatorial District. He is a member of the All Progressives Congress (APC).

Ndubueze was first elected to the Federal House of Representatives in 1992.
