= Chris Anyanwu =

Nigerian journalist and politician (born 1951)

Christiana Anyanwu
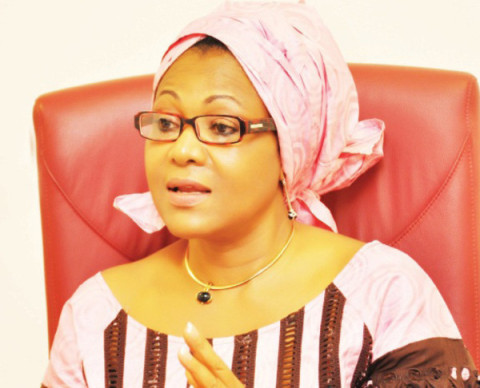

Senator for Imo East
- In office 29 May 2007 – 2015
- Preceded by: Amah Iwuagwu
- Succeeded by: Samdady Anyanwu

Chris Anyanwu
- Born: 28 October 1951 (age 74); Mbaise, Imo State, Nigeria
- Occupations: Journalist, senator
- Known for: 1995–98 imprisonment
- Spouse: Casmir Anyanwu
- Children: Ihuoma and Nduwueze
- Awards: Courage in Journalism Award (1995); Guillermo Cano World Press Freedom Prize (1998)

Christiana "Chris" Anyanwu MFR (born 28 October 1951) is a Nigerian journalist, publisher, author, and politician. She was imprisoned from 1995 to 1998 for treason after reporting on a failed coup d'état against the government of Sani Abacha, and won several international journalism prizes during her confinement, including the UNESCO/Guillermo Cano World Press Freedom Prize.

Believing that she could make more of an impact in politics than in journalism, Anyanwu ran for office and was elected Senator for the Imo East (Owerri) constituency in 2007.

== Early life and career ==
Anyanwu was born in Mbaise, Imo State. She attended Owerri Girls Secondary School before moving to the US, where she earned a bachelor's degree in journalism from the University of Missouri and a master's degree in Mass Communication from Florida State University.

After graduating, she returned to Nigeria, and worked for the NTA and the Imo Broadcasting Corporation as a news reader and reporter. In 1987, she was appointed Imo State commissioner for Information, Youth, Sports, Culture and Social Welfare under Imo governor Amadi Ikwechegh. Following her tenure as commissioner, Anyanwu became publisher/editor-in-chief of TSM (The Sunday Magazine), a weekly publication focused on political issues.

== Imprisonment ==
In May 1995 Anyanwu was arrested following the publication of a story about a failed coup d'état against the government of Sani Abacha, whom she had refused to endorse as president; she and several Nigerian journalists were accused of being "accessory after the fact of treason". Anyanwu was prosecuted in camera by a military court and sentenced to life imprisonment on 4 July 1995, later reduced to 15 years in October 1995 following pressure from national and international human rights groups. While being held in Gombe prison, she went partially blind. Doctors warned that she was in danger of losing her sight completely if she failed to receive medical attention.

Shortly after her imprisonment, she received the International Women's Media Foundation Courage in Journalism Award, making news around the world. Anyanwu, then held in solitary confinement, was passed a note that read, "Some women in America are giving you a prize. The world is watching". Anyanwu later told the IWMF that receiving the award had buoyed her spirits while in prison: "Yes! Somebody must understand or else they wouldn’t just give out an award like this ... I was very much encouraged and strengthened by it. And it made me confident and determined not to cave into pressure." Two years later, the Committee to Protect Journalists named Anyanwu winner of the CPJ International Press Freedom Award, and in May 1998 she was awarded UNESCO's Guillermo Cano World Press Freedom Prize. Because of her imprisonment, Nobel Prize in Literature laureate Wole Soyinka attended the ceremony to accept the latter on her behalf.

== Post-imprisonment ==
In June 1998, following the death of President Abacha and several protests from human rights groups worldwide, Anyanwu was released by Abacha's successor General Abdulsalam Abubakar on health grounds. She spent two years in Virginia, during which she wrote the book Days of Terror about Nigeria's struggle during the dictatorship. Returning to Nigeria after her book's release, she testified to her experiences in prison and confronted her former jailers, publicly forgiving one after he apologized to her.

A televised version of her now-defunct publication TSM Show was aired in 2001. In 2005, Anyanwu opened her radio station Hot 98.3 FM, based in Abuja. Anyanwu was featured in the PBS Frontline production titled Nigeria: The Road North in 2003.

== Political career ==
During the Nigerian general election, 2007 Anyanwu was elected to the Senate on the platform of the People's Democratic Party (PDP) as a representative of Owerri Zone, Imo State, Nigeria. In describing her change in careers, she stated, "I felt I could do more than observe and moan the things that were not going right ... With my years of reporting government, politics, social issues, oil and diplomacy, I had come to understand governance issues well. I felt I could be more useful in helping find solutions to the problems."

After taking her seat in the Senate she was appointed to committees on Women and Youth, States & Local Government, Millennium Development Goals, Health, Environment and Defence & Army. In a mid-term evaluation of Senators in May 2009, ThisDay reported that she had sponsored bills on Occupational Health and Safety and to Criminalise and Punish Discrimination and Segregation against Nigerians, and had sponsored seven motions. The report described her as an engaging contributor to debates in plenary who was active in the committees. Anyanwu was a successful contender to be reelected as Senator for Imo East on the All Progressives Grand Alliance (APGA) platform in the April 2011 elections. The PDP declared that they would contest the result, claiming that voting was marred by violence.

== Personal life ==
Anyanwu is married to Casmir Anyanwu, with whom she has a daughter, Ihuoma, and a son, Nduwueze, who live in the US. She is a devout Christian.
