= Onyereri Jones =

Nigerian politician

Jones Chukwudi Victor Onyereri, commonly known as Jones Onyereri, is a Nigerian politician. He represented the Nkwerre/Isu/Njaba/Nwangele Federal Constituency of Imo State in the House of Representatives from 2011 to 2019 under the People's Democratic Party (PDP).
