= Hot FM (Abuja) =

- Abuja; Nigeria
- Broadcast area: Federal Capital Territory
- Frequency: 98.3 MHz

Programming
- Format: Contemporary, Hip-Hop, Alternative, Talk

Ownership
- Owner: Spectrum Broadcasting (Nigeria) Limited (private)
- Sister stations: Hot FM 99.5 (Lagos)

History
- First air date: 1 March 2005

Links
- Website: www.hotfm.ng/abuja

Hot 98.3 FM is a Nigerian radio station that broadcasts on the 98.3 FM frequency from Abuja, in Nigeria's Federal Capital Territory. It started broadcasting on 1 March 2005.

Hot 98.3 FM is licensed to broadcast to the North Central zone (middle belt region) of the country. It broadcasts a mix of adult contemporary music and news/talk programming.

== History ==
Hot FM was founded in January 2005. It is owned and operated by Spectrum Broadcasting Co. Nig Ltd.
