= ESPZEN =

Amateur football association

ESPZEN is the amateur football association organisation based in Singapore. The organisation was founded in 2004 by Lee Taylor, an English banker residing in Singapore. ESPZEN is affiliated to Football Association of Singapore.

One of the biggest amateur football organisations in Singapore, ESPZEN has over 180 teams and 4000 players. Its main category leagues are the Sunday League, Saturday League and the Midweek League. ESPZEN organised football leagues for open category, veteran category and juniors category. It also has 11-a-side social and amateur football, 5-a-side football league and 7-a-side football leagues.

== ESPZEN Sunday League ==
ESPZEN Sunday League
- Organising body: ESPZEN
- Founded: 2004
- Country: Singapore
- Level on pyramid: 5-7
- Domestic cup: ESPZEN Champion Cup
- Website: espzen.com/index.php

ESPZEN Sunday League was founded in 2004. It is considered the premier football tournament of ESPZEN. Matches are usually play on Sunday at 3.00pm.

The first ESPZEN Sunday League match was played on 23 May 2004 between amateur clubs MATADOR Football Club and Killer Whales Football Club with a 1–0 win for the Killer Whales.

=== Famous Clubs ===
- Barbarians FC
- Purple Monkey FC
- SCC Tigers
- May Kha FC
- St Davids FC of Wales
- Aioli Gaulois FC
- FC PROTEGE ESPZEN
- Predator FC SG
- DHL FC

=== Sunday League Past Winners ===
The ESPZEN Sunday League is the premium football league of ESPZEN. The league consists of numerous divisions with amateur Expatriate clubs residing in Singapore.

| Season | Division 1 Winners | Division 1 Runners-up |
|---|---|---|
| MATADOR Systems Champions League (Season 1) | Barbarians Football Club (Sunday League) | Racing Football Club |
| Sunsports F1 Challenge League (Season 1) | International Soccer Academy | New Olympique Singapore FC |
| MATADOR Sunday League 2 | International Soccer Academy | Racing Football Club |
| MATADOR Sunday League 3 | International Soccer Academy | Maccabees Football Club |
| MATADOR Sunday League 4 | International Soccer Academy | Team Beyond Imagination |
| MATADOR Sunday League 5 | International Soccer Academy | Hibernians Athletic Football Club |
| MATADOR Sunday League 6 | International Soccer Academy | Hibernians Athletic Football Club |
| MATADOR Sunday League 7 | Team Beyond Imagination | Ale Vasco Football Club |
| MATADOR Sunday League 8 | Team Beyond Imagination | FC 204 |
| MATADOR Sunday League 9 | FC 204 | Hibernians Athletic Football Club |
| MATADOR Sunday League 10 | FC 204 | Racing Football Club |
| MATADOR Sunday League 11 | Racing Football Club | FC PROTEGE ESPZEN |
| MATADOR Sunday League 12 | FC PROTEGE ESPZEN | Racing Football Club |
| MATADOR Sunday League 13 | SCC Tigers Football Club | Tusser Ranger Football Club |
| MATADOR Sunday League 14 | SCC Tigers Football Club | FC PROTEGE ESPZEN |
| MATADOR Sunday League 15 | Aioli United Football Club | SCC Tigers Football Club |
| MATADOR Sunday League 16 | Armanis Football Club | Racing Football Club |
| MATADOR Sunday League 17 | Aioli United Football Club | SCC Tigers Football Club |

| Season | Division 2 Winners | Division 2 Runners-up |
|---|---|---|
| MATADOR Sunday League 2 | Hearts Football Club | ITALIA Football Club |
| MATADOR Sunday League 3 | Tusser Ranger Football Club | Tembusu Football Club |
| MATADOR Sunday League 4 | Hibernians Athletic Football Club | Real Madras Riders |
| MATADOR Sunday League 5 | Jaguar Football Club | May Kha Football Club |
| MATADOR Sunday League 6 | Ale Vasco Football Club | Vivid Football Club |
| MATADOR Sunday League 7 | Brazilian Soccer Schools | ITALIA Football Club |
| MATADOR Sunday League 8 | Jaguar Football Club | Hibernians Social Football Club |
| MATADOR Sunday League 9 | FC Protege 204 ESPZEN | Orchard Rovers Galacticos |
| MATADOR Sunday League 10 | Greats Football Club | Armanis Football Club |
| MATADOR Sunday League 11 | Tusser Ranger Football Club | Orchard Rovers Galacticos |
| MATADOR Sunday League 12 | SCC Tigers Football Club | TGA Football Club |
| MATADOR Sunday League 13 | Barbarians Football Club | Hibernians Athletic Football Club |
| MATADOR Sunday League 14 | Aioli United Football Club | Greats Football Club |
| MATADOR Sunday League 15 | Nasrin Football Club | Fighting Cocks Football Club |
| MATADOR Sunday League 16 | Tusser Ranger Football Club | Greats Football Club |
| MATADOR Sunday League 17 | Misfits AFC | FC Protege 204 ESPZEN |

| Season | Division 3 Winners | Division 3 Runners-up |
|---|---|---|
| MATADOR Sunday League 2 | Barclays Football Club | Tembusu Football Club |
| MATADOR Sunday League 3 | SideKick Football Club | Knights Football Club |
| MATADOR Sunday League 4 | Jaguar Football Club | Official10 Football Club |
| MATADOR Sunday League 5 | Vivid Football Club | Ale Vasco Football Club |
| MATADOR Sunday League 6 | East of Anfield Football Club | Aioli United Football Club |
| MATADOR Sunday League 7 | Los Leones Football Club | Holland Park XI Football Club |
| MATADOR Sunday League 8 | FC Protege 204 ESPZEN | FC Venom |
| MATADOR Sunday League 9 | Bakar C.F. | Greats Football Club |
| MATADOR Sunday League 10 | White Wolfton Football Club | Fighting Cocks Football Club |
| MATADOR Sunday League 11 | SCC Tigers Football Club | Barbarians Football Club |
| MATADOR Sunday League 12 | Central Park Football Club | ANZA Young Lions Football Club |
| MATADOR Sunday League 13 | Gabrielite Remix Football Club | Admiralz Football Club |
| MATADOR Sunday League 14 | Nasrin Football Club | YDM UTD Football Club |
| MATADOR Sunday League 15 | Singapore Vikings Football Club | Eastern Vale Football Club |
| MATADOR Sunday League 16 | YDM UTD Football Club | Misfits AFC |
| MATADOR Sunday League 17 | Holland Park XI Football Club | ESPZEN Primero Football Club |

| Season | Division 4 Winners | Division 4 Runners-up |
|---|---|---|
| MATADOR Sunday League 2 | SideKick Football Club | Knights Football Club |
| MATADOR Sunday League 3 | Las Wolves Football Club | Jaguar Football Club |
| MATADOR Sunday League 4 | May Kha Football Club | Gabrielite Remix Football Club |
| MATADOR Sunday League 5 | Orchard Rovers II Football Club | East of Anfield Football Club |
| MATADOR Sunday League 6 | Team H Football Club | Ishkawa Football Club |
| MATADOR Sunday League 7 | BNP PARIBAS Sports Club | Greats Football Club |
| MATADOR Sunday League 8 | Ishkawa Football Club | Bakar C.F. |
| MATADOR Sunday League 9 | Armanis Football Club | MATADOR Football Club |
| MATADOR Sunday League 10 | Tusser Ranger Football Club | TGA Football Club |
| MATADOR Sunday League 11 | Prestige Marine Football Club | Central Park Football Club |
| MATADOR Sunday League 12 | Admiralz Football Club | Los Diablos Football Club |
| MATADOR Sunday League 13 | TUS Football Club | Team Prodigy Football Club |
| MATADOR Sunday League 14 | Hibernians Social Football Club | Team H Football Club |
| MATADOR Sunday League 15 | Misfits AFC | FC MYK |
| MATADOR Sunday League 16 | ESPZEN Primero Football Club | Holland Park XI Football Club |
| MATADOR Sunday League 17 | TUS Football Club | James Cook University Singapore Football Club |

| Season | Division 5 Winners | Division 5 Runners-up |
|---|---|---|
| MATADOR Sunday League 3 | Ale Vasco Football Club | Gabrielite Remix Football Club |
| MATADOR Sunday League 4 | Aioli United Football Club | Ishkawa Football Club |
| MATADOR Sunday League 5 | Bakar C.F. | Andernese Football Club |
| MATADOR Sunday League 6 | BNP PARIBAS Sports Club | Gogooryo Football Club |
| MATADOR Sunday League 7 | Armanis Football Club | Hibernians Legends Football Club |
| MATADOR Sunday League 8 | AIG Football Club | Central Park International |
| MATADOR Sunday League 9 | YDM UTD Football Club | TGA Football Club |
| MATADOR Sunday League 10 | Playouts Reunited Football Club | TSCC Tigers Football Club |
| MATADOR Sunday League 11 | Madcats United Football Club | Team Prodigy Football Club |
| MATADOR Sunday League 12 | Raptors Football Club | TUS Football Club |
| MATADOR Sunday League 13 | VNNTU Football Club | Suave Fusion Football Club |
| MATADOR Sunday League 14 | FC MYK | Misfits AFC |
| MATADOR Sunday League 15 | ESPZEN Primero Football Club | Vincitore Football Club |
| MATADOR Sunday League 16 | James Cook University Singapore Football Club | DHL Football Club |
| MATADOR Sunday League 17 | Purple Monkeys Football Club | Deportivo Singapura Football Club |

| Season | Division 6 Winners | Division 6 Runners-up |
|---|---|---|
| MATADOR Sunday League 3 | Ishkawa Football Club | Aioli United Football Club |
| MATADOR Sunday League 4 | Team H Football Club | Team Spirit Football Club |
| MATADOR Sunday League 5 | BNP PARIBAS Sports Club | CFU Internacional |
| MATADOR Sunday League 6 | Los Leones Football Club | DHL Football Club |
| MATADOR Sunday League 7 | White Wolfton Football Club | Central Park International |
| MATADOR Sunday League 8 | YDM UTD Football Club | TGA Football Club |
| MATADOR Sunday League 9 | Playouts Reunited Football Club | Central Park Football Club |
| MATADOR Sunday League 10 | Singapore Pirates Football Club | Y Homeless Football Club |
| MATADOR Sunday League 11 | Admiralz Football Club | Los Diablos Football Club |
| MATADOR Sunday League 12 | Singapore Pirates Football Club | ESPZEN One-touchables Football Club |
| MATADOR Sunday League 13 | Misfits AFC | FC MYK |
| MATADOR Sunday League 14 | ESPZEN Primero Football Club | Vincitore Football Club |
| MATADOR Sunday League 15 | DHL Football Club | Team Frankel Football Club |
| MATADOR Sunday League 16 | Purple Monkeys Football Club | Prestige Marine Football Club |
| MATADOR Sunday League 17 | Subbuteo Football Club | Hibernians Youth Football Club |

| Season | Division 7 Winners | Division 7 Runners-up |
|---|---|---|
| MATADOR Sunday League 4 | Unknown Elites Football Club | Frontal Football Club |
| MATADOR Sunday League 5 | Los Leones Football Club | AIG Football Club |
| MATADOR Sunday League 6 | Afifi United Football Club | White Wolfton Football Club |
| MATADOR Sunday League 7 | AIG Football Club | Suave Fusion Football Club |
| MATADOR Sunday League 8 | Central Park Football Club | Madcats United Football Club |
| MATADOR Sunday League 9 | FC Gila Galactico | Singapore Pirates Football Club |
| MATADOR Sunday League 10 | Simei United Football Club | Team Prodigy Football Club |
| MATADOR Sunday League 11 | Eastern Vale Football Club | Nasrin Football Club |
| MATADOR Sunday League 12 | ESPZEN Primero Football Club | Misfits AFC |
| MATADOR Sunday League 13 | R.A.B II Football Club | Vipers Evolution Football Club |
| MATADOR Sunday League 14 | Team Frankel Football Club | DHL Football Club |
| MATADOR Sunday League 15 | White Wolfton Football Club | Purple Monkeys Football Club |
| MATADOR Sunday League 16 | Futbolitas Football Club | Every Sunday Football Club |
| MATADOR Sunday League 17 | Joga Bonito Football Club | Goodanx Brigades Football Club |

| Season | Division 8 Winners | Division 8 Runners-up |
|---|---|---|
| MATADOR Sunday League 5 | SELECAO Football Club | Suave Fusion Football Club |
| MATADOR Sunday League 6 | The Blues Football Club | Poseur United Football Club |
| MATADOR Sunday League 7 | Interstar Football Club | Central Park Football Club |
| MATADOR Sunday League 8 | C9 UTD Football Club | Red Star Semangat Football Club |
| MATADOR Sunday League 9 | FC Gila Galactico | Singapore Pirates Football Club |
| MATADOR Sunday League 10 | Timbre United Football Club | Los Diablos Football Club |
| MATADOR Sunday League 11 | The Saints Football Club | FC El Leon |
| MATADOR Sunday League 12 | Question Mark FC | Jaws SC |
| MATADOR Sunday League 13 | Team Frankel Football Club | James Cook University Singapore Football Club |
| MATADOR Sunday League 14 | SWAT Football Club | Inner Circle Football Club |
| MATADOR Sunday League 15 | Warriorz Vege Football Club | Pakiyoko Football Club |
| MATADOR Sunday League 16 | New Olympique Singapore Football Club | Entertainers Football Club |
| MATADOR Sunday League 17 | Winthrop Football Club | ANZA Lions Football Club |

| Season | Division 9 Winners | Division 9 Runners-up |
|---|---|---|
| MATADOR Sunday League 6 | Armanis Football Club | Bricklands Football Club |
| MATADOR Sunday League 7 | YDM UTD Football Club | East Avenue Football Club |
| MATADOR Sunday League 8 | Legends United Football Club | KNV6 Football Club |
| MATADOR Sunday League 9 | Admiralz Football Club | ESPZEN One-touchables Football Club |
| MATADOR Sunday League 10 | FC Socheaux | Prestige Marine Football Club |
| MATADOR Sunday League 11 | Misfits AFC | ESPZEN Primero Football Club |
| MATADOR Sunday League 12 | R.A.B II Football Club | James Cook University Singapore Football Club |
| MATADOR Sunday League 13 | Assumption United Football Club | Barracudas Football Club |
| MATADOR Sunday League 14 | Purple Monkeys Football Club | Arima Singapura Football Club |
| MATADOR Sunday League 15 | Futbolistas Football Club | Entertainers Football Club |
| MATADOR Sunday League 16 | British Exiles Football Club | Liberty Spirits Football Club |
| MATADOR Sunday League 17 | Paix Football Club | APFC |

| Season | Division 10 Winners | Division 10 Runners-up |
|---|---|---|
| MATADOR Sunday League 9 | Y Homeless Football Club | Los Diablos Football Club |
| MATADOR Sunday League 10 | Eastern Vale Football Club | ESPZEN One-touchables Football Club |
| MATADOR Sunday League 11 | InnerCircle Football Club | Royals Football Club |
| MATADOR Sunday League 12 | Vipers Evolution Football Club | Killer Whales Football Club |
| MATADOR Sunday League 13 | Swat Football Club | Chap Pah Lang Football Club |
| MATADOR Sunday League 14 | Lorong Football Club | Entertainers Football Club |
| MATADOR Sunday League 15 | Team Spirits Football Club | Westlanders United Football Club |
| MATADOR Sunday League 16 | Goodanx Brigade Football Club | Mok Football Club |
| MATADOR Sunday League 17 | Santiago Football Club | Jurong Shipyard Football Club |

| Season | Division 11 Winners | Division 11 Runners-up |
|---|---|---|
| MATADOR Sunday League 10 | R.A.B Football Club | ESPZEN Flaming Reds Football Club |
| MATADOR Sunday League 12 | Team Frankel Football Club | Vipers Football Club |
| MATADOR Sunday League 13 | Arima Singapura Football Club | Philippine Football Club (SG) |
| MATADOR Sunday League 14 | White Wolfton Football Club | F.C. Rovers |
| MATADOR Sunday League 15 | Everyday Sunday Football Club | Kebun Baru United FC |
| MATADOR Sunday League 16 | Joga Bonito Football Club | Project Intensify Football Club |

| Season | Division 12 Winners | Division 12 Runners-up |
|---|---|---|
| MATADOR Sunday League 13 | Purple Monkeys Football Club | Homewest United Football Club |
| MATADOR Sunday League 14 | Subbuteo Football Club | Warriorz Vege Football Club |
| MATADOR Sunday League 15 | Winthrop Football Club | Goodanx Brigades Football Club |
| MATADOR Sunday League 16 | APFC | Paix Football Club |

| Season | Division 13 Winners | Division 13 Runners-up |
|---|---|---|
| MATADOR Sunday League 15 | Underboys Football Club | DE Christhu Football Club |

== ESPZEN Saturday League ==
ESPZEN Saturday League is a social football league organised by ESPZEN. It serves mainly for academy and social teams for weekend football.

=== Saturday League Winners ===
The ESPZEN Saturday League is the social league organised by ESPZEN to cater amateur and social footballers to take part in Football activities on Saturday.

| Season | Winners | Runners-up |
|---|---|---|
| Season 1 | International Soccer Academy | Numero Uno Football Club |
| Season 2 | International Soccer Academy | Knights Football Club |
| Season 3 | International Soccer Academy (Division 1); Standard Chartered Bank FC (Division 2) | Crescent Rangers Football Club (Division 1); Saturday Pirates Football Club |
| Season 4 | Club Futbol de Galacticos (Division 1); TGA Buffalos Football Club (Division 2) | International Soccer Academy (Division 1); Blue Oyster Football Club (Division 2) |
| Season 5 | International Soccer Academy (Division 1); Blue Oyster Football Club (Division 2) | Crescent Rangers Football Club (Division 1); Redsaga II Football Club (Division 2) |
| Season 6 | International Soccer Academy (Division 1); Meridian Generations FC (Division 2); Real Ale Madrid Football Club (Division 3) | TGA Buffalos Football Club (Division 1); Sengkang Rangers FC (Division 2); Dynamites Football Club (Division 3) |
| Season 7 | International Soccer Academy (Division 1); Fake Madrid FC (Division 2); El Retador Football Club (Division 3); Blue Oysters Football Club (Division 4) | Team Intense Football Club (Division 1); TeamCuzz Football Club (Division 2); FC Hospitality (Division 3); Socceritez Revolutionz FC (Division 4) |
| Season 8 | Team Intense Football Club (Division 1); El Retador Football Club (Division 2); RockU Football Club (Division 3); Rosso Football Club (Division 4); Royal City Avenue FC (Division 5) | Fake Madrid FC (Division 1); Sporting TGA Football Club (Division 2); Blue Oysters Football Club (Division 3); Eclectico Football Club (Division 4); Phoenix United Football Club (Division 5) |
| Season 9 | St Andrews Football Club (Division 1); TeamCuzz Football Club (Division 2); Phoenix United Football Club (Division 3); VR Eagles Football Club (Division 4); The Sailors FC (Division 5) | Team Intense Football Club (Division 1); Rosso Football Club (Division 2); Eclectico Football Club (Division 3); VNPos Football Club (Division 4); BNP PARIBAS Sports Club (Division 5) |
| Season 10 | St Andrews Football Club (Division 1); RockU Football Club (Division 2); YANK OL BOYZ FC(Division 3); Hibernians FC Saturday Socials (Division 4); Hiadis Football Club (Division 5); ONERS FC (Division 6) | Team Intense Football Club (Division 1); Blue Oysters Football Club (Division 2); Team GOAT FC (Division 3); H4 United Football Club (Division 4); JKS Football Club (Division 5); Etoile FC Academy (Division 6) |
| Season 11 | El Retador Football Club (Division 1); Phoenix United Football Club (Division 2); Jigsaw Disunited Football Club(Division 3); Hiadis Football Club (Division 4); Team Jubilee Football Club (Division 5); Botakgang Football Club (Division 6) | Team Intense Football Club (Division 1); Sporting TGA Football Club (Division 2); FC Hospitality (Division 3); Gattaca Football Club (Division 4); Team FC (Division 5); Sons Of Pitches Football Club (Division 6) |
