= Jerry Alagbaoso =

Nigerian politician

Member of the Imo State House of Assembly
- Constituency: Orlu, Oru East, Orsu Constituency

Personal details
- Born: Imo State, Nigeria
- Party: All Progressives Congress (APC)
- Occupation: Politician

Jerry Alagbaoso is a Nigerian politician. He was a member representing Orlu/Oru East/Orsu Federal Constituency in the House of Representatives.

== Early life and education ==
Jerry Alagbaoso was born on 28 September 1953 in Orlu, Imo State. He obtained his West African School Certificate (WAEC) from Holy Ghost College (Arugo High School), Owerri. He obtained his bachelor’s degree in 1974 from University of Ibadan, Jos campus, and a master’s degree in 1980 from the same university.

== Political career ==
He was elected in 2011 as a member representing Orlu/Oru East/Orsu Federal Constituency and served until 2023. In 2022, he declared his intention to run for a senatorial seat at the 2023 elections and in 2023, he defected to the All Progressives Congress (APC) from the Peoples Democratic Party (PDP). As a federal lawmaker, he served in several committees including Special Duties, Media and Public Affairs, Diaspora Matters, Customs and Excise, Education (Basic & Secondary), Banking & Currency, Commerce, and Chairman, Federal Roads Maintenance Agency Committee.

== Work history ==
From 1981 to 2006, he worked as a public servant at the Iroko Community Grammar School, Ibadan. In 2006, he was employed at the Nigerian Customs Service as Customs Area Controller for Calabar seaport and Calabar free trade zone, Akwa Ibom and tin can island port.

== Award and honors ==
- Paul Harris Fellow, Rotary International for Motion on Autism
- Fellow, Nigeria Academy of Education
