= Sylvester Anyanwu =

Nigerian politician

Sylvester Udubuisi Anyanwu

Senator for Imo North
- In office 29 May 2007 – May 2011
- Preceded by: Ifeanyi Godwin Araraume
- Succeeded by: Matthew Ifeanyi Nwagwu

Personal details
- Born: 26 May 1951 (age 74) Imo State, Nigeria

Sylvester Udubuisi Anyanwu (born 26 May 1951) was elected Senator for the Imo North (Okigwe) constituency of Imo State, Nigeria, taking office on 29 May 2007. He is a member of the People's Democratic Party (PDP).

Anyanwu obtained a bachelor's degree in accounting, economics and a master's degree in business administration (finance). He worked as a banker abroad for many years before returning to Nigeria. He served as a youth corps member at the Nigeria Customs Service, and later joined the military. Subsequently, he served as Commissioner For Commerce And Industry, Imo State and Chairman of the Nkalagu Cement Factory.

After taking his seat in the Senate he was appointed to committees on States & Local Government, Science & Technology, Public Accounts, Niger Delta and Communications (Chairman). In a mid-term evaluation of Senators in May 2009, ThisDay gave him an "average" score, noting that he had sponsored a bill to establish the Institute of Treasury Management and had been active in the Communications Committee. Talking of Imo State, and Nigeria in general, in a May 2010 interview he said that in the forthcoming 2011 elections any senator, governor or local government chairman seeking reelection must be able to point at things they had achieved. He identified provision of power and improvements in security as primary issues.
