= Frank Ibezim =

Nigerian politician (born 1964)

Chukwuma Frank Ibezim
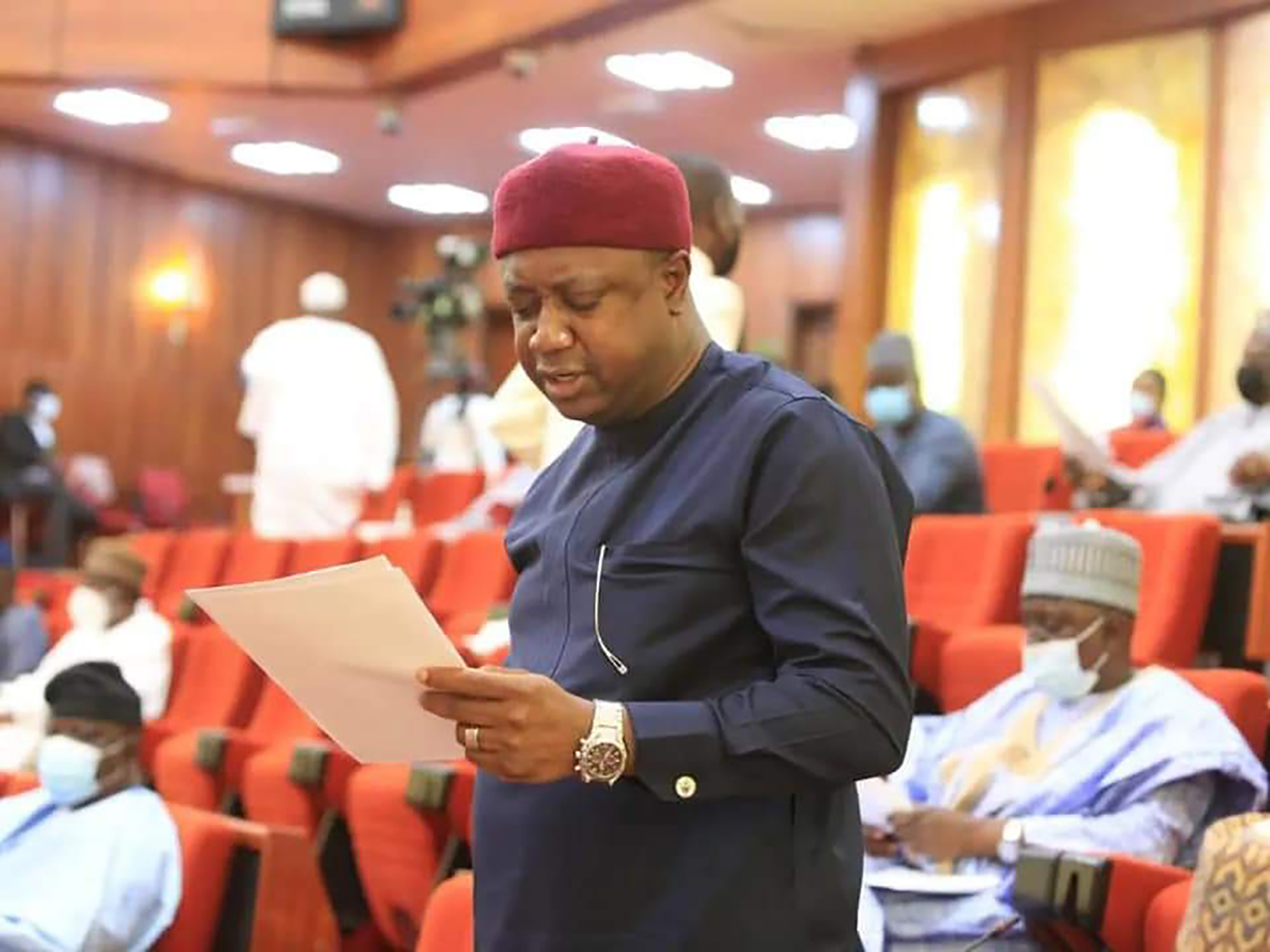
- Politician

Senator of the Federal Republic of Nigeria from Imo North Senatorial District
- Incumbent
- Assumed office 2021-present
- Preceded by: Benjamin Uwajumogu

Personal details
- Born: 16 December 1964 (age 61) Ezeoke Nsu
- Party: All Progressives Congress

Chukwuma Frank Ibezim// (born December 16, 1964) is a Nigerian politician and current senator representing the North Senatorial District of Imo State in the national assembly of Nigeria. He is a member of the All Progressive Congress (APC) party, the country's ruling party.

== Early life and education ==
Ibezim was born to Sir Hezekiah and Lady Priscilla Ibezim in Ezeoke Nsu in Ehime Mbo Local Government Area of Imo State. He attained his primary education at St. Stephens Primary school Umuahia and went further to obtain his West African Examinations Council (WAEC) certificate from Uboma Secondary School in 1980. Ibezim obtained a bachelor's degree in Industrial Chemistry in 1987 at the Imo State University and completed his mandatory one year National Youth Service Corps, (NYSC) in 1989 at the Nigerian Bottling Company (Coca-Cola) Port Harcourt.

== Career ==
Ibezim's past public roles include serving as the Commissioner for Agriculture and Natural Resources, Imo State between the period of 2014 and 2015. Special Adviser (Political) to Minister of State for Education between 2015 and 2019.

== Political life ==
In 2010 Ibezim aspired to represent the Okigwe South Federal Constituency in the House of Representatives, but was unsuccessfully. He was later made the Director, Contacts and Mobilisation of the All Nigeria Peoples Party (ANPP).

In 2013, Ibezim became among those credited to be the founding members of the All Progressives Congress (APC), the ruling party in Nigeria.

In 2019, BBC in Igbo language reported the passing on of Benjamin Uwajumogu, the senator representing Imo North in the National Assembly at the time, Ibezim showed interest among other contestants to fill the vacancy the dead of Uwajumogu created in the seat of Imo North in the National Assembly.

== Controversies ==
During his senatorial ambition, a Nigerian high court on 5 December 2020 disqualified Ibezim following fueled allegations of certificate forgery and impersonation; and the verdict was given in favour of his political opponent, Senator Ifeanyi Godwin Ararume. But on February 6, 2021, the Supreme Court, Nigeria's highest court reversed Ibezim's disqualification on the grounds that the suit which led to Ibezim's disqualification was statute-barred because it was not filed within the stipulated time. On April 27 later that year, Ibezim was officially sworn into the Senate.
