= Ezenwa Francis Onyewuchi =

Nigerian senator

Senator Ezenwa Francis Onyewuchi
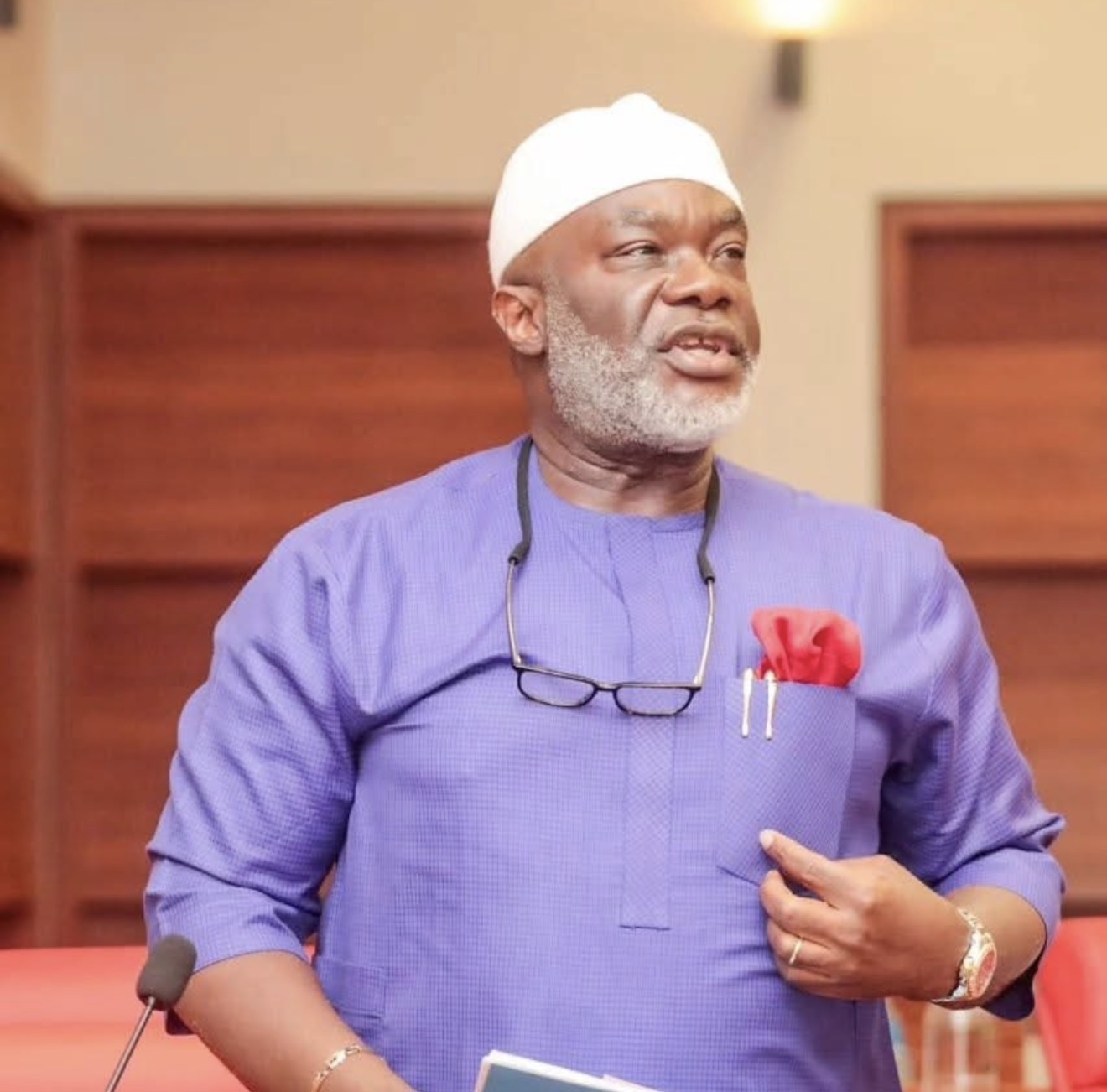

Senator for Imo East
- Incumbent
- Assumed office June 2019
- Preceded by: Samuel Anyanwu

Member of the House of Representatives from Imo State
- In office June 2011 – June 2019
- Preceded by: Ibjiko I. Ernest
- Succeeded by: Ikenna Elezieanya
- Constituency: Owerri Municipal/Owerri North/Owerri West

Personal details
- Born: 2 April 1968 (age 58) Owerri, Imo State
- Citizenship: Nigeria
- Party: All Progressives Congress (2024–present)
- Spouse: Chikamadu Onyewuchi
- Education: Bachelor of Sociology, Master of Business Administration, Master of Public Policy and Administration
- Alma mater: University of Nigeria, Nsukka SOAS University of London
- Occupation: Politician
- Website: https://ezenwaonyewuchi.org

Onyewuchi Francis Ezenwa // born in 1968 is a Nigerian politician and Senator representing Imo East Senatorial district. He served the people of Imo State from 2011-2027 at the National Assembly.

== Early life ==
Ezenwa Onyewuchi was born in Orji, Owerri North LGA of Imo State on April 2nd 1968 to the family of Hon. Ambrose Olumba Onyewuchi and Lady Alice Onyewuchi. His father, Ambrose Olumba Onyewuchi was member of the Eastern Region parliament during the Nigerian First Republic (1961-1966). His father also served as a Commissioner in Governor Sam Mbakwe's cabinet, in this role he was instrumental in setting up the foundational infrastructure, schools, and civic projects of Imo State.

His father was a Chief, titled Ebubedike I and he is also titled Ebubedike II of the Orji people in Owerri North.

Ezenwa Onyewuchi attended Government College, Owerri for his secondary education and the prestigious University of Nigeria, Nsukka in Enugu where he obtained a B.Sc and MBA. He completed his youth service in Rivers State, and moved to Lagos upon completion of his service year where he established himself as a business man with early interests in manufacturing, real estate and commodity trading. He owned and operated manufacturing and assembly businesses, and traded chemical products. Later transitioning to active politics. He also obtained a MSc in Public Policy and Administration from SOAS University of London.

He married Chikamadu Onyewuchi, née Njamzanze from the Njemanze Royal Family of Owerri. Daughter of Dan Njemanze, SAN who served as the Commissioner for Economic Development and Reconstruction in the former East Central State of Nigeria (1971-1974), his work was centred around rebuilding the core of Igbo land devastated by the civil war.

== Early political career ==
In the 2003 election cycle, Ezenwa Onyewuchi entered politics through the People's Democratic Party (PDP) which was the dominant political party in Imo State and in Nigeria as a whole. He contested the party primaries for a House of Representatives seat but was unsuccessful.

In the 2007 election cycle, he expressed an interest in the same position but stepped down before the primaries and worked to achieve the governorship ambition of Kema Chikwe, former Aviation Minister and Transportation Minister in the Cabinet of President Olusegun Obasanjo. Despite her popularity in Imo State, the zoning agreement was in favour of a different political zone.

He decamped to APGA after the 2007 general elections and served as a member of the Finance committee.

== House of Representatives (2011-2019) ==
Ezenwa Onyewuchi contested in the 2011 general elections and won the seat in the House of Representatives representing Owerri Municipal/Owerri North/Owerri West Federal constituency in Imo State.

He won a re-election bid to the House of Representatives in 2015 and was appointed Chairman of the House committee on Labour, Employment and Productivity by the Speaker Rt. Hon. Yakubu Dogara where he had the opportunity to promote his legislative interest of human capital development.

== Senate (2019-2027) ==
He contested for a seat at the Nigerian Senate in 2019 and won to represent the Imo East Senatorial district (Owerri zone). In the 2019 general election, Onyewuchi under the PDP polled 146,647 votes (68.90%) and his closest rival Ojinere Emmanuel polled 33,729 votes (15.85%). He was appointed the Vice Chair of the Senate committee on State and Local government. In this role he was a vocal advocate for local government autonomy and grassroots development.

As the incumbent Senator In 2022, Onyewuchi lost the PDP senatorial primaries to retain his seat to Hon. Uche Onyeagucha, a close ally of former Imo State Governor Emeka Ihedioha. Onyewuchi and Ihedioha, once colleagues in the House of Representatives and close political allies had a falling out leading up to the PDP primaries of 2022 and as political tension grew after the party primaries he decamped from the PDP to the Labour Party (LP). He won the Labour Party ticket to contest for his senate seat in the 2023 general elections and polled 100,631 votes to beat Hon. Uche Onyeagocha of the PDP who scored 87,229 votes.

In his second term in the Senate, he was appointed Chairman of the Senate committee on NASENI (National Agency for Science and Engineering Infrastructure) by the Senate President Godswill Akpabio. Where he made a shift to empower his constituents with digital skills and encouraged the youths to transition from brick and mortar business models to more technologically empowered businesses.

His continued electoral victory to serve in the National Assembly made Senator Onyewuchi the longest serving Federal legislator in the history of Imo State as of the 10th National Assembly holding from 2023-2027, representing Imo State for four consecutive terms of 16 years.

On July 22, 2026, the Imo State Governor Hope Uzodimma officially commissioned the NASENI skills acquisition centre in Owerri. The project was facilitated and built by Senator Ezenwa Onyewuchi, in collaboration with NASENI. This skills acquisition centre is to promote practical skill acquisition among the community youths, where they have the opportunity to attend courses on fisheries, graphic design and printing, solar installation and maintenance, and phone repairs and graduate with the tools they need to begin their selected trade.

== Legislative activities ==
Onyewuchi is credited with the following bills, amongst others;

Older Persons (Rights and Privileges) Bill 2019. Alvan Ikoku Federal University of Education, Owerri (Establishment Bill) 2024. Standard Organization of Nigeria Bill 2024. Tribunal of Inquiry Act (Amendment) Bill 2020. Labour Act Amendment Bill (Increase of Penalties). Criminal Code Act (Amendment) Bill 2025. Child Rights Act Amendment Bill 2020. Labour Act Amendment Bill (Special Incentive For The Employment Of The Disabled). Palm Oil Produce Board Bill 2024. National Universities Commission Act (Amendment) Bill 2021. The Nigeria Police Act (Amendment) Bill 2025.

Key Constituency projects include;

Electricity: Commissioned a 500KVA transformer substation in Ahiazu Mbaise to resolve long-standing power issues.

Water & Security: Installed 10,000-liter solar-powered boreholes and solar street lights in various communities and schools in Owerri.

ICT Centers: Sponsored the construction and equipping of a state-of-the-art ICT Center at Claretian University of Nigeria, providing students with high-speed internet and modern computing tools.

Infrastructure: Community centres commissioned such as Uratta Civic Centre, Nguru Civic Centre in Ngor Okpala.

Established the Senator Onyewuchi Ultra Modern Skill Acquisition Center Trained over 2,500 youths in high-demand fields such as Artificial Intelligence (AI), Information Communication Technology (ICT), and fisheries.

Healthcare: Regularly organizes medical outreaches, including free treatment programs and surgeries for constituents in Owerri Municipal and North LGAs.

== Awards and honours ==
- NUJ legacy award
