= Matthew Ifeanyi Nwagwu =

Nigerian politician

Senator for Imo North
- In office May 2011 – June 2015
- Preceded by: Sylvester Anyanwu

Personal details
- Died: Nil
- Party: People's Democratic Party (PDP)
- Profession: Diplomat / Politician

Matthew Ifeanyi Nwagwu is a Nigerian politician who was elected senator for the Imo North constituency of Imo State, Nigeria in the April 2011 national elections. He ran on the People's Democratic Party (PDP) platform.

== Background ==
In November 2001, Matthew Ifeanyi Nwagwu was Nigeria's deputy representative to the World Trade Organization's General Council. He was highly critical of a draft treaty to be discussed at Doha, saying "The text generally accommodates in total the interests of developed countries while disregarding the concerns of the developing and least developed countries". Speaking in July 2004 on behalf of the Africa Group, Nwagwu said the group expected an all-inclusive and transparent process in further work on the draft decision to be adopted at the WTO General Council meeting of 27–29 July.

== Senate ==
In the January 2011 PDP primaries for the Okigwe senatorial zone, Matthew Nwagwu won with 2,128 votes, ahead of the previous Secretary to the Government of Imo State, Chief Cosmas Iwu, who gained 129 votes. Cosmas, younger brother of former Independent National Electoral Commission Chairman, Professor Maurice Iwu, had resigned his appointment in order to compete. Nwagwu, who had a Bachelor of Science degree, was aged 67 at this time. In the 6 April 2011 election, former ambassador Nwagwu was elected as Senator of Imo North with 60,449 votes, ahead of runner up Chief Cosmas Nkemjika Iwu who had moved to the Action Congress of Nigeria (ACN) and won 47,258 votes.

In a 2011 interview, Nwagwu expressed desire to help with the image of Nigerians abroad, citing problems such as not paying their debts and being involved with drugs.
