= Betty Anyanwu-Akeredolu =

Nigerian activist and fishery expert (born 1953)

Her Excellency Betty Anyanwu-Akeredolu

First lady of Ondo State
- In role 24 February 2017 – 27 December 2023
- Governor: Rotimi Akeredolu
- Preceded by: Olukemi Mimiko
- Succeeded by: Oluwaseun Aiyedatiwa

Personal details
- Born: Betty Onyetugochioma Claribel Uburuamaka Anyanwu; 20 July 1953 (age 73) Owerri, Southern Region, British Nigeria (now in Imo State, Nigeria)
- Party: All Progressives Congress
- Spouse: Rotimi Akeredolu (m. 1981; died 2023)
- Children: 4
- Education: University of Nigeria, Nsukka (BSc); University of the Philippines Visayas (MS)
- Profession: Politician; aquaculturist
- Website: brecan.org

Betty Anyanwu-Akeredolu (born 20 July 1953) is a Nigerian aquaculturist who was the first lady of Ondo State in Nigeria from 2017 to 2023. She is a feminist and gender activist. She was married to former governor of Ondo State Rotimi Akeredolu. She is the founder of the Breast Cancer Association of Nigeria, and a survivor of breast cancer.

== Birth ==
Betty Anyanwu-Akeredolu was born on 20 July 1953, to the family of chief BUB and Nneoma Dora Anyanwu, in Emeabiam, Owerri-West, in Imo State.

== Education ==
Anyanwu-Akeredolu attended the University of Nigeria, Nsukka where she obtained a Bachelor of Science degree in zoology in 1977. She holds a Master of science degree in fisheries, major in aquaculture, from the University of the Philippines Visayas in Iloilo City, Philippines.

== Career ==
She began her career as a fish farmer while working with the Federal Department of Fisheries. She retired in 2005. She is a commercial fish farmer and provides consultancy services through her firm, Aquatek Farms Ventures. In addition, she has made a foray into politics since 2007 and is active in the present (2017) dispensation.

== Charity and philanthropy ==
In 1997, she was diagnosed with breast cancer. She underwent treatment and survived. She started the nonprofit organization, Breast Cancer Association of Nigeria (BRECAN) to raise awareness of the disease. She has won awards in recognition of her work and commitment in the fight against breast cancer in Nigeria.

She is also a supporter of the Bring Back Our Girls movement.

She was passionate about the widow that made her launch a platform for them to gain from the dividends of democracy.

== Personal life ==
Anyanwu-Akeredolu married Rotimi Akeredolu, former governor of Ondo State in April 1981. He died on 27 December 2023, after a prolonged health battle with leukaemia and prostate cancer at the age of 67. They had four children and four grandchildren.

== See also ==
- List of first ladies of Nigerian states
