= National Agency for Science and Engineering Infrastructure =

Agency overview
- Formed: 1 January 1992; 34 years ago
- Jurisdiction: Nigeria
- Headquarters: 17 M. S. Haruna Avenue, Idu Industrial Area, Abuja, Nigeria
- Agency executive: Khalil Suleiman Halilu, Executive Vice Chairman / CEO
- Website: https://naseni.gov.ng

The National Agency for Science and Engineering Infrastructure (NASENI) is a federal government agency in Nigeria established in 1992 under the Presidency. Formed based on the recommendations of the White Paper Committee on the 1991 Report of a 150-member National Committee on Engineering Infrastructure, its core mandate is to manage the research, development, and reverse engineering of capital goods to drive indigenous industrialization.

NASENI is designed to operate outside the traditional civil service structure to foster a rapid, cost-effective culture of technological innovation. The agency focuses on manufacturing spare parts, scientific equipment, electronic components, and agricultural machinery, subsequently transferring these developed technologies and patents to local entrepreneurs and Small and Medium Scale Enterprises (SMEs) to reduce the nation's reliance on foreign imports.

The agency operates through a network of specialized development institutes across Nigeria's geopolitical zones, including the Electronics Development Institute (ELDI) in Awka, the Engineering Materials Development Institute (EMDI) in Akure, and the Scientific Equipment Development Institutes (SEDI) in Enugu and Minna. It is governed by a board chaired directly by the President of Nigeria, with day-to-day operations led by an Executive Vice Chairman.

The National Agency for Science and Engineering Infrastructure (NASENI) was established in 1992 by The Nigerian Federal Government of the recommendations of the White Paper Committee on the 1991 Report of a 150-member National Committee on Engineering Infrastructure comprising scientists, engineers, administrators, federal and state civil servants, economists, lawyers, bankers and industrialists.

Khalil Halilu is the executive vice chairman and chief executive of the agency in Abuja, Nigeria. The post was formerly held by Bashir Gwandu.

== Mandate ==
NASENI, by its mandate and scope of operation is the Nigerian only purpose-built agency designed to conduct developmental work in the areas of manufacturing, and as such, it is capable of coordinating the proliferation of technologies developed either within or outside of its Centers including patents obtained. Technologies developed in the areas of spares, components and systems engineering are to be transferred to entrepreneurs for the production of goods and services. Nigeria can have the benefit of a rapid technological development by strengthening NASENI.

== Development Institutes ==
NASENI operates mainly through Development Institutes. Each of the institutes has a unique mandate of Engineering Infrastructural development. Currently, there are 11 Development Institutes.

ELDI Electronics Development Institute, Awka

EMDI Engineering Materials Development Institute, Akure

NEDDI National Engineering Design Development Institute, Nnewi

AMTDI Advanced Manufacturing Technology Development Institute, Jalingo

PEEMADI Power Equipment and Electrical Machinery Development Institute, Okene

SEDI-E Scientific Equipment Development Institute, Enugu

SEDI-M Scientific Equipment Development Institute, Minna

SOMMEDI Solid Minerals Machinery and Equipment Development Institute (SOMMEDI), Nasarawa

In August 2010, the agency said it had completed plans to establish centres of excellence and research on material science in nine universities in the Niger Delta region. The agency has produced science kits for secondary schools, which it will distribute nationwide if funding is available. NASENI has completed a 7.5 Megawatts Solar Panel Manufacturing Plant in Abuja and a 10KW Hydro Power Plant at Ketti Site in Abuja.

== Past DGs/EVCs ==
1. Professor Gordian O. Ezekwe - FAS (1st Chairman/CE): 1992 – 1997
2. Dr. Timothy I. Obiaga (OFR) DG/CE: 1997 – 2003
3. Professor Olusegun O. Adewoye - FAS: 2003 – 2012
4. Dr. Mohammed Sani Haruna EVC/CEO: 2012-2023
5. Dr. Bashir Gwandu EVC/CEO: May - August 2023

== See also ==
- "NASENI Home Page".
