= Ikedi Ohakim =

Nigerian politician

4th Governor of Imo State
- In office 29 May 2007 – May 2011
- Preceded by: Achike Udenwa
- Succeeded by: Rochas Okorocha

Personal details
- Born: 4 August 1957 (age 69) Okohia, Isiala Mbano LGA, Imo State, Nigeria
- Party: People's Democratic Party (PDP)

Ikedi Ohakim // (born 4 August 1957) is a Nigerian businessman who became governor of Imo State in the South Eastern region in May 2007, standing for the Progressive Peoples Alliance (PPA). He later switched to the People's Democratic Party (PDP).

== Background ==
Ikedi Ohakim was born on 4 August 1957 in Okohia in Isiala Mbano Local Government Area of Imo State. He attended the University of Lagos, gaining a BSc in business administration and a master's degree in management. Ohakim worked for over 15 years at First Aluminium and then at Tower Groups. He became executive director of Alucon in 1997, and later became chairman of Mekalog Group, an engineering firm supplying the defense, security, construction, fabrication, oil and gas sectors.

Ohakim is married to Barrister Chioma Ohakim and they have five children. One of their daughters Adanna Steinacker, is a medical doctor, entrepreneur, public speaker, and digital influencer. She is married to German native David Steinacker, a business consultant in the technology sector.

== Early political career ==
Ohakim was appointed Commissioner for Commerce, Industry and Tourism of Imo State from 1992 to 1993 under governor Evan Enwerem. The government was removed from office by the military regime headed by General Sani Abacha.

He was one of the founding members of the People's Democratic Party (PDP) in Imo State, and remained a PDP member until November 2006, when he switched membership to the Progressive Peoples Alliance (PPA). He ran for governor of Imo State on the PPA platform in April 2007. Ohakim had aspired to be the PDP governorship candidate, but claimed that he pulled out because of what he described as "commercialization" of the party ticket, deciding to run for another party instead. He said there was little ideological difference between the PDP and the PPA.

After widespread violence broke out during voting on 14 April 2007, the Independent National Electoral Commission cancelled the election and rescheduled it for 28 April 2007. Ohakim was declared the victor of the second election. His opponent Martins Agbaso of the All Progressives Grand Alliance (APGA) challenged the decision, claiming he was leading when the first election was cancelled, and claiming other irregularities. After protracted legal battles, on 16 December 2009 the Appeal Court in Abuja ordered a fresh trial.

== Governor of Imo State ==
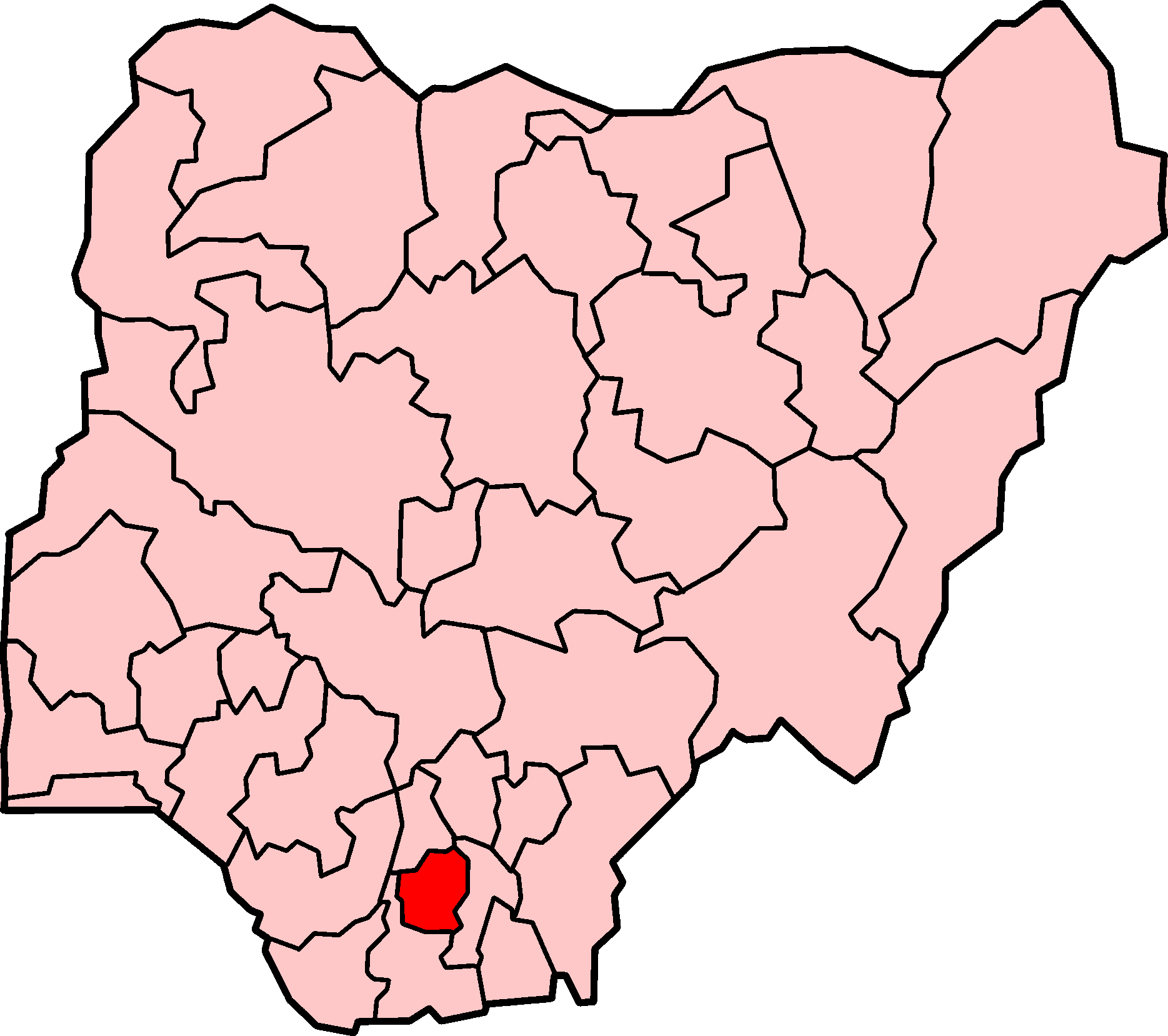
Imo State in Nigeria

In April 2009 Ohakim led a fourteen-man delegation to Taiwan to see what lessons from that resource-poor but dynamic economy could be applied to Nigeria. Imo state is a major oil producer, but infrastructure is in poor shape and the state does not have sufficient revenue for urgently needed development projects. In June 2009, Imo State issued a N18.5 billion seven-year fixed rate bond. Ohakim said that 7% of the money raised would be used for rehabilitation of water supplies, 20% for road repair and construction, and 68% for the state government's investment in Imo Wonder Lake and Conference Centre, Oguta.

On 25 July 2009, Ohakim publicly switched allegiance back to the People's Democratic Party (PDP) at a ceremony in Owerri attended by President Umaru Yar'Adua, Vice President Goodluck Jonathan, former President Olusegun Obasanjo and other party leaders. The move was controversial, and PPA members filed court actions claiming that it was illegal.

Speaking about problems in the Niger Delta in October 2009, Ohakim called for the Federal Government to revise the Land Use Act, address environmental degradation from oil exploration, increase economic intervention and find employment for youths. He said that local communities and local leaders must be involved in the decision-making process. In November 2009 the Imo State legislature enacted a law, "Imo State Prohibition and Hostage-taking and Other Related Offences", that makes it a capital offence for anybody to be involved in kidnapping or hostage-taking. The law was enacted by a majority of more than 2/3 after Ohakim had refused to sign it on the grounds that he felt it was unnecessarily harsh. At a 2009 Christmas party for traditional rulers in the state he announced a 13% pay rise for monarchs, expressed concern about disputes over rulership, and urged the rulers to cooperate in bringing criminals to justice, noting that his government had provided vehicles and other equipment for the vigilance groups.

In November 2009, the Imo House of Assembly issued an arrest warrant for Orji Uzor Kalu, former governor of Abia State, and Comrade Maximus Uba, President Imo Democratic Congress and newspaper columnist. The warrant was for their failure to appear before the house to substantiate allegations of misappropriation of Imo State funds by Ohakim. Maximum Uba had written a number of hostile articles in publications such as Thisday since Ohakim was elected.

== Publications ==
In 1994, Ohakim published The Marketing Imperative for Rural Industrialization (Africana Educational Publishers). He published three books while governor. Pushing the Limits describes his personal career and political philosophy. The Courage to Challenge and Challenging New Frontiers are collections of speeches. He launched the three books at a ceremony in Lagos in July 2009.

== See also ==
- List of governors of Imo State
