= Ifeanyi Ararume =

Nigerian politician

Ifeanyi Godwin Ararume

Senator for Imo North
- In office May 1999 – May 2007
- Succeeded by: Sylvester Anyanwu

Senator for Imo North
- In office Dec 2020 – 2023
- Preceded by: Benjamin Uwajumogu
- Succeeded by: Chiwuba Patrick Ndubueze

Personal details
- Born: 16 December 1958 (age 67) Imo State, Nigeria
- Party: APC

Ifeanyi Godwin Ararume (born 16 December 1958) is a Nigerian politician who was appointed as the country's minister of Petroleum Resources and as the Chairman, Board of Management of the Nigerian National Petroleum Company Limited (NNPC Ltd.), in the wake of implementation of the Petroleum Industry Act (PIA). He was the senator who represented Imo North at the 9th Nigerian National Assembly. He was elected Senator for the Imo North (Okigwe) constituency of Imo State, Nigeria at the start of the Nigerian Fourth Republic, running on the People's Democratic Party (PDP) platform. He took office on 29 May 1999. He was re-elected in April 2003. After taking his seat in the Senate in June 1999, Ararume was appointed to committees on Communications, Police Affairs, Federal Character, Finance & Appropriation, Information and Niger Delta (vice chair).

Ararume won the PDP primaries in 2007 to run for governor of Imo State. The party chose to run Charles Ugwu in his place. Ararume protested this decision and secured a Supreme Court ruling in his favor. The party expelled him and chose not to field a candidate, leaving the field open for Ikedi Ohakim of the Progressive Peoples Alliance (PPA).

== Early life ==
Ararume was born on 16 December 1958 in Isiebu, Umuduru in Isiala Mbano Local Government Area of Imo State, Nigeria, to late Marcus Ararume and Adaezi Grace Ararume (Nee Anyiam). He started his formal education at Saint Christopher Primary School, Umuluwe, Ajirija in Isiala Mbano. He completed his secondary education at Dick Tiger Memorial Secondary School, Amaigbo, after previously enrolling at Sapele Technical College, now in Delta State. He earned a Bachelor of Science degree in business administration from Liberty University in Lynchburg, Virginia, and a Master of Science degree (M.Sc.) in international relations from the University of Benin.

== Career ==
Senator Araraume is a career politician. His history in politics began in the 1990s. He served as State Treasurer for Liberal Convention in old Imo State between 1988 and 1989. He joined National Finance Committee of the defunct National Republican Convention (NRC) created by former military dictator General Ibrahim Babangida from 1990 to 1993, and as Chairman, NRC Presidential Primaries for Kwara and Delta States. He was the pioneer State Chairman of the defunct All People's Party (APP); later All Nigeria Peoples Party (ANPP) in Imo State (1998 – 1999).

He was elected to the Senate representing Imo North (Okigwe) constituency of Imo State, Nigeria in 1999 under the platform of People's Democratic Party (PDP) and was re-elected in 2003. During his tenure as a Senator, he served in Senate committees; he was the Chair of the Senate committee on Power and Steel, Vice Chairman of the Senate committee on Culture and Tourism, Vice Chairman of the Senate committee on the Niger Delta Development Commission (NDDC), Chairman Public Hearing committee for South-West zone on amendments to the 1999 Constitution, member of the National Assembly Joint Constitution Review Committee (JCRC) and Chairman of the Senate Committee on Local and Foreign Debts. He was Chairman of the Southern Senators' Forum.

=== Political controversies ===
Ararume practices non-ideological politics. He jumps from one political party to another frequently. He has belonged to all the major political parties in Nigeria. His political career has been fraught with controversies. After winning PDP governorship primaries for Imo State in 2007, the party ran Charles Ugwu in his place due to disputes with party executives. The party claimed his vote tally fell short of the two-thirds stipulation agreed by the party's Congress and that the election was marred by violence. Ararume protested this decision and secured a Supreme Court ruling in his favor. He was however, expelled from the party for anti-party activities and the party chose not to field a candidate in the governorship election. Prior to his election as a senator in 1999, Ararume was the state chairman of the defunct All Peoples Party (APP). He decamped from the APP to PDP a few days before PDP's national assembly primaries where he won the nomination under controversial circumstances.

He later joined the Action Congress of Nigeria (ACN) where he contested the gubernatorial election in 2011 but lost to Rochas Okorocha of All Progressives Grand Alliance (APGA). In 2014, Ararume rejoined the Peoples Democratic Party and contested for its gubernatorial nomination in 2015, which he lost to Chukwuemeka Ihedioha. He later decamped again from PDP to All Progressives Congress (APC) and joined with the incumbent governor Okorocha during the 2015 governorship election. On 5 September 2018, Senator Ararume left the ruling party APC and joined APGA where he is currently contesting the gubernatorial nomination.
