= Benjamin Uwajumogu =

Nigerian politician (1968–2019)

Senator
- In office June 2019 – December 2019
- Constituency: Imo North

Personal details
- Born: June 30, 1968 Imo State
- Died: December 18, 2019 (aged 51) Abuja
- Party: All Progressives Congress (APC)
- Profession: Politician

Benjamin Uwajumogu // (June 30, 1968 – December 18, 2019) was a Nigerian politician. He was a member of the All Progressives Congress Party representing Imo North senatorial district in the 9th republic of the Nigerian National Assembly before his death.

== Early life ==
Uwajumogu was born in Okigwe, Ihitte Uboma, Imo State, Nigeria on 30 June 1968.

== Political life ==
In March 2018, Uwajumogu made a proposition to the Senate to prohibit child labour and urged the Executive and its agencies to uphold the implementation of the Child Rights Act.

In June 2018, Uwajumogu resigned his appointment as the secretary of the APC national convention committee and stated it was for "personal reasons".

On July 26, 2019, Uwajumogu was sworn in for a second term as the Senator representing Imo North.

== Death and aftermath ==
After returning to Abuja from the United Arab Emirates for the treatment of his protracted illness, Uwajumogu died in his home on December 18, 2019, in Abuja.

A by-election was conducted in 2021 to fill Uwajumogu's vacant seat at the senate where Chukwuma Frank Ibezim succeeded him.

== Awards and honours ==
- NUJ man of the year, 2007.
