= Osita Izunaso =

Nigerian politician (born 1966)

Senator for Imo West
- In office June 2023 – Present
- Preceded by: Rochas Okorocha

Personal details
- Born: 30 October 1966 (age 59) Imo State, Nigeria
- Party: All Progressives Congress

Osita B. Izunaso (born 30 October 1966) is the current Senator for the Imo West (Orlu) constituency of Imo State, Nigeria, taking office in June 2023. He is a member of the All Progressives Congress (APC).

Izunaso obtained a BA (Hons) from the University of Jos (1989), a post-graduate degree in journalism from the University of Abuja (1998) and an MBA from the University of Calabar (2002).

He was elected to the House of Representatives in 1992 and again in 1999, and was appointed Chief Press Secretary to the Speaker and Senate President. He was Chief Press Secretary to the Minister of Youth and Sports (1995–1997) and was Minister of Labour & Productivity (1998–1999).

After taking his seat in the Senate he was appointed to committees on Rules & Business, Local and Foreign Debts, Housing, Gas, Foreign Affairs and Sports.

In a mid-term evaluation of Senators in May 2009, This Day noted that he had sponsored bills for the Conveyance of Persons in Articulated Vehicles Bill, Treatment and Care of Victims of Conflict, National Agency for the Promotion and Preservation of Local Languages in Nigeria and Amendment of the Oil Pipelines Act Amendment. He contributed to plenary debates and was active in committees.

Osita Izunaso served as the National Organizing Secretary for the All Progressives Congress (APC) in Nigeria from February 2013 to May 2018. During his tenure spanning over five years, Izunaso played a role in shaping and coordinating the party's organizational structure.

Osita Izunaso then served as the board chairman of the National Automotive Design and Development Council (NADDC) Governing Council in Nigeria from June 2018 to May 2022. In this role, he led the formulation of policies to further the country's automotive industry. Izunaso promoted innovation, research, and development within the sector.

His tenure emphasized the Council's commitment to enhancing Nigeria's automotive competitiveness, fostering collaborations with government bodies and the private sector. Under Izunaso's leadership, the NADDC succeeded in spearheading initiatives that significantly promoted innovation in the country. From June 2018 to May 2022, his efforts contributed to the notable growth of the automotive sector, leaving a lasting impact on Nigeria's industrial and technological landscape.

He is also the founder of KpaKpando Foundation a dedicated non-profit organization aimed at empowering and enabling individuals with disabilities. Notably, his advocacy work has played a role in reshaping legislation to better protect and uphold the rights of disabled people.

He then pursued and successfully completed a Bachelor of Law (LLB) degree at Nile University, achieving the distinction of a First Class, and earning the title of the Best Graduating Student in his cohort. Subsequently, in 2021, he furthered his legal education by attending Law School, where he attained a Second Class Upper and earned the designation of Barrister and Solicitor of the Supreme Court of Nigeria.

On the 8 August 2023 he was named the chairman, Senate committee on Capital market of the 10th Senate of Nigeria.
