= Nigerian National Assembly delegation from Benue =

Benue's delegation in Nigeria's National Assembly

The Nigerian National Assembly delegation from Benue comprises three Senators representing Benue South, Benue North-East, and Benue North-West, and 11 Representatives representing Apa/Agatu, Kwande/Ushongo, Oju/Obi Vandeikya/Konshisha, Buruku, Ado/Ogbadigba/Opkokwu, Katsina-Ala/Ukum/Logo, Gboko/Tarka, Makurdi/Guma, Gwer/Gwer-west and Otukpo/Ohimini.

== Fourth Republic ==
=== The 10th Parliament (2023 till date) ===
OFFICE	NAME	PARTY	CONSTITUENCY	TERM
Senator	Patrick Abba Moro	PDP	Benue South	2019–till date
Senator	Emmanuel Udende	APC	Benue North-East	2023–till date
Senator	Titus Zam	APC	Benue North-West	2023–till date
Representative	Ojema Ojotu	PDP	Apa/Aguta	2023–till date
Representative	Terseer Ugbor	APC	Kwande/Ushongo	2023–till date
Representative	Sesoo Ikpagher	APC	Vandeikya/Konshisha	2023–till date
Representative	Sekav Iyortyom	APC	Buruku	2023–till date
Representative	Philip Agbese	APC	Ado/Ogbadigba/Opkokwu	2023–till date
Representative	Solomon Wombo	APC	Katsina-Ala/Ukum/Logo	2023–till date
Representative	Regina Akume	APC	Gboko/Tarka	2023–till date
Representative	Dickson Tarkighir	APC	Makurdi/Guma	2023–till date
Representative	Asema Achado	APC	Gwer East/Gwer West	2023–till date
Representative	Blessing Onyeche Onuh	APC	Oturkpo/Ohimini	2023–till date

=== The 9th Parliament (2019–2023) ===
OFFICE	NAME	PARTY	CONSTITUENCY	TERM
Senator	Patrick Abba Moro	PDP	Benue South	2019–till date
Senator	Gabriel Suswam	PDP	Benue North-East	2015–till date
Senator	Emmanuel Yisa Orker-Jev	PDP	Benue North-West	2019–till date
Representative	Godday Odagboyi Samuel	PDP	Apa/Aguta	2019–till date
Representative	Robert Aondona Tyough	PDP	Kwande/Ushongo	2019–till date
Representative	Dorathy Mato	APC	Vandeikya/Konshisha	2017–till date
Representative	Kpam Jimin Sokpo	PDP	Buruku	2019–till date
Representative	Ottah Francis Agbo	PDP	Ado/Ogbadigba/Opkokwu	2019–till date
Representative	Richard Iorkyaan Gbande	PDP	Katsina-Ala/Ukum/Logo	2019–till date
Representative	John Dyegh	APC	Gboko/Tarka	2019–till date
Representative	Bem Benjamin Mzondu	PDP	Makurdi/Guma	2019–till date
Representative	Mark Gbillah	PDP	Gwer East/Gwer West	2019–till date
Representative	Blessing Onyeche Onuh	APGA	Oturkpo/Ohimini	2019–till date

=== The 8th Parliament (2015–2019) ===
OFFICE	NAME	PARTY	CONSTITUENCY	TERM
Senator	David Mark	PDP	Benue South	2015–2019
Senator	Barnabas Gemade		Benue North-East	2015–2019
Senator	George Akume		Benue North-West	2015–2019
Representative	Ochepo Adamu	PDP	Apa/Aguta	2015–2019
Representative	Iorember Wayo	APC	Kwande/Ushongo	2015–2019
Representative			Igede	2015–2019
Representative	Herman Hembe	APC	Vandeikya/Konshisha	2015–2019
Representative	Orker-Jev Yisa	APC	Buruku	2015–2019
Representative	Adabah Christian	PDP	Ado/Ogbadigba/Opkokwu	2015–2019
Representative	Memga Emmanuel	PDP	Katsina-Ala/Ukum/Logo	2015–2019
Representative	John Dyegh	APC	Gboko/Tarka	2015–2019
Representative	Dickson Tarkighir	APC	Makurdi/Guma	2015–2019
Representative	Mark Gbillah	APC	Gwer East/Gwer West	2015–2019
Representative	Awulu Adaji	PDP	Oturkpo/Ohimini	2015–2019
Representative	Aja Samson	PDP	Oju/Obi	2015–2019

=== The 7th Parliament (2011–2015) ===
OFFICE	NAME	PARTY	CONSTITUENCY	TERM
Senator	David Mark	PDP	Benue South	2011–2015
Senator	Barnabas Gemade	APC	Benue North-East	2011–2015
Senator	George Akume	APC	Benue North-West	2011–2015
Representative	Ochepo Adamu	PDP	Apa/Aguta	2011–2015
Representative	Aboho Ityokumba		Kwande/Ushongo	2011–2015
Representative			Igede	2011–2015
Representative	Herman Hembe		Vandeikya/Konshisha	2011–2015
Representative			Buruku	2011–2015
Representative	Saleh Anthony	PDP	Ado/Ogbadigba/Opkokwu	2011–2015
Representative	Memga Emmanuel	PDP	Katsina-Ala/Ukum/Logo	2011–2015
Representative	John Dyegh		Gboko/Tarka	2011–2015
Representative	Jime Emmanuel		Makurdi/Guma	2011–2015
Representative	Alaaga Demnenge	APC	Gwer East/Gwer West	2011–2015
Representative	Awulu Adaji	PDP	Otukpo/Ohimini	2011–2015
Representative	Aja Samson	PDP	Oju/Obi	2011–2015

=== The 4th Parliament (1999–2014) ===
OFFICE	NAME	PARTY	CONSTITUENCY	TERM
Senator	David Mark	PDP	Benue South	1999–2003
Senator	Daniel Iyorkegh Saro	PDP	Benue North-East	1999–2003
Senator	Joseph Waku	PDP	Benue North-West	1999–2003
Representative	Agidani Solomon Umoru	PDP	Apa/Aguta	1999–2003
Representative	Gbande Moses Akuha Tor	PDP	Kwande/Ushongo	1999–2003
Representative	Idikwu Altine Oga	PDP	Igede	1999–2003
Representative	Jooji Tachia	PDP	Vandeikya/Konshisha	1999–2003
Representative	Malherbe Zakarie Andiir	PDP	Buruku	1999–2003
Representative	Obande Samuel Onazi	PDP	Ado/Ogbadigba/Opkokwu	1999–2003
Representative	Gabriel Suswam	PDP	Katsina-Alu/Ukum/Logo	1999–2003
Representative	Terngu Tsegba	PDP	Gboko/Tarka	1999–2003
Representative	Upaa Cletus Tivnongu Kinga	PDP	Makurdi/Guma	1999–2003
Representative	Goddy Igbaraav Ikerave	PDP	Gwer/Gwer-West	1999–2003
