= 2023 Nigerian Senate elections in Benue State =

2023 Senate elections in Benue

- 25 February 2023

All 3 Benue State seats in the Senate of Nigeria
	Majority party
Party	PDP
Last election	3
Seats before	3
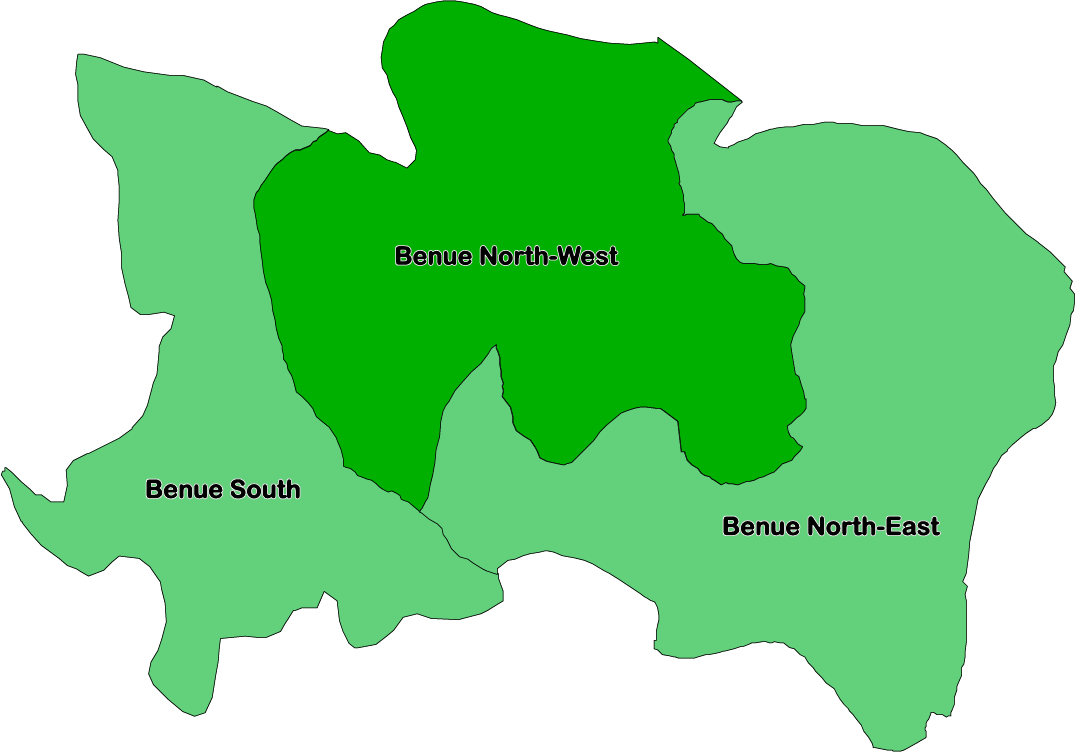
- PDP incumbent retiring PDP incumbent running for re-election

The 2023 Nigerian Senate elections in Benue State will be held on 25 February 2023, to elect the 3 federal Senators from Benue State, one from each of the state's three senatorial districts. The elections will coincide with the 2023 presidential election, as well as other elections to the Senate and elections to the House of Representatives; with state elections being held two weeks later. Primaries were held between 4 April and 9 June 2022.

== Background ==
In the previous Senate elections, none of the three incumbent senators were returned, with longtime Senator David Mark (PDP-South) retiring whilst Barnabas Andyar Gemade (SDP-North-East) and George Akume (APC-North-West) were defeated in their re-election bids. In the South district, Patrick Abba Moro retained the seat for the PDP with 49% of the vote; the PDP gained the other two seats as Gabriel Suswam unseated Gemade with 53% in the North-East while Akume was defeated in the North-West by Emmanuel Yisa Orker-Jev with 57% of the vote. These results were a part of a wider shift back towards the PDP in Benue as PDP presidential nominee Atiku Abubakar narrowly won the state after Buhari had won it in 2015 and the PDP won seven House of Representatives seats. Similarly, Governor Samuel Ortom (PDP) won re-election by over 10% and the PDP won a majority in the House of Assembly.

== Overview ==
Affiliation	Party		Total
Affiliation	PDP	APC	Total
Previous Election	3	0	3
Before Election	3	0	3
After Election	1	2	3

== Summary ==
District	Incumbent		Results	
District	Incumbent	Party	Status	Candidates
Benue North-East	Gabriel Suswam	PDP	Incumbent lost re-election New member elected APC gain	▌ ✓ Emmanuel Memga Udende (APC); ▌Gabriel Suswam (PDP)
Benue North-West	Emmanuel Yisa Orker-Jev	PDP	Incumbent retired New member elected APC gain	▌ ✓ Titus Zam (APC); ▌Samuel Ortom (PDP)
Benue South	Patrick Abba Moro	PDP	Incumbent re-elected	▌Daniel Onjeh (APC); ▌ ✓ Patrick Abba Moro (PDP)

== Benue North-East ==
2023 Benue North-East Senatorial District election
- 25 February 2023
Nominee	Emmanuel Memga Udende	Torngee Malu	Gabriel Suswam
Party	APC	LP	PDP
Senator before election
Gabriel Suswam
PDP
Elected Senator
To be determined
To be determined

The Benue North-East Senatorial District covers the local government areas of Katsina-Ala, Konshisha, Kwande, Logo, Vandeikya, Ukum, and Ushongo. The district is often referred to as "Zone A" and is also noted for its ethnic Tiv majority. The incumbent Gabriel Suswam (PDP), who was elected with 52.6% of the vote in 2019, is seeking re-election.

=== Primary elections ===
==== All Progressives Congress ====
On 20 April 2022, the APC National Executive Committee announced the party's schedule for senatorial primaries, setting its expression of interest form price at ₦3 million and nomination form price at ₦17 million with a 50% discount for candidates younger than 40 while women and candidates with disabilities get free nomination forms. Forms were to be sold from 26 April to 6 May until the deadline was later extended to 10 May then 12 May. After the submission of nomination forms by 13 May, candidates were screened by a party committee on 14 and 15 May while 18 May was the date for the screening appeal process. Ward congresses and LGA congresses were set for 16 and 17 May to elect delegates for the primary. Candidates approved by the screening process advanced to a primary set for 27 May, in concurrence with other APC senatorial primaries; challenges to the result could be made on 28 May.

On the primary date, seven candidates contested a direct primary that ended with Emmanuel Memga Udende—former MHR for Katsina-Ala/Ukum/Logo—winning the nomination after results showed him defeating Terlumun Akputu by a 40% margin.

APC primary results
Party	Candidate	Votes	%
APC	Emmanuel Memga Udende	211,887	66.80%
APC	Terlumun Akputu	84,304	26.57%
APC	Torngee Malu	16,139	5.09%
APC	Andrew Ayabam	1,934	0.61%
APC	Helen Atom	1,557	0.49%
APC	Sam Zuga	1,078	0.34%
APC	Manasseh Denga	304	0.10%
Total votes		317,203	100.00%

==== People's Democratic Party ====
On 16 March 2022, the national PDP announced its senatorial primary timetable, setting its expression of interest form price at ₦1 million and the nomination form price at ₦20 million with a 50% discount for candidates between 25 and 30. Forms were to be sold until 1 April but the party later extended the deadline four times before reaching a final deadline of 22 April. After the submission of nomination forms by 25 April, candidates were screened by a party committee on 27 April while 2 May was the rescheduled date for the screening appeal process. Ward congresses were set for 29 April and LGA congresses were rescheduled for 10 May to elect delegates for the primary. Candidates approved by the screening process advanced to a primary set for 23 May, in concurrence with other PDP senatorial primaries but due to often violently enforced Monday stay-at-home orders by separatists, southeastern state parties held their primaries on 24 May; challenges to the result could be made on 25 May.

On the primary date, an indirect primary ended with Suswam's renomination as he was unopposed.

=== Campaign ===
In December 2022, reporting from The Punch stated that while Udende and Suswam were the two frontrunners, Torngee Malu (LP) could obtain a significant share of the vote total.

=== General election ===
==== Results ====
2023 Benue North-East Senatorial District election
Party	Candidate	Votes	%
AA	Sam Zuga		
ADP	Kwamanda Kwamande		
ADC	Demian Jiraji		
APC	Emmanuel Memga Udende		
APGA	Williams Iyorwuese Ligom		
LP	Torngee Malu		
NRM	Kaor Sesugh Titus		
New Nigeria Peoples Party	Samuel Shangev-De Adzango		
PRP	Andrew Aondoaseer Isho		
PDP	Gabriel Suswam		
SDP	Martin Msughter Iorsamber		
Total votes			100.00%
Invalid or blank votes			N/A
Turnout			

== Benue North-West ==
2023 Benue North-West Senatorial District election
- 25 February 2023
Nominee	Titus Zam	Mark Gbillah	Samuel Ortom
Party	APC	LP	PDP
Senator before election
Emmanuel Yisa Orker-Jev
PDP
Elected Senator
To be determined
To be determined

The Benue North-West Senatorial District covers the local government areas of Buruku, Gboko, Gwer East, Gwer West, Guma, Makurdi, and Tarka. The district is often referred to as "Zone B" and is also noted for its ethnic Tiv majority. The incumbent Emmanuel Yisa Orker-Jev (PDP), who was elected with 56.5% of the vote in 2019, is retiring from the Senate.

=== Primary elections ===
==== All Progressives Congress ====
On 20 April 2022, the APC National Executive Committee announced the party's schedule for senatorial primaries, setting its expression of interest form price at ₦3 million and nomination form price at ₦17 million with a 50% discount for candidates younger than 40 while women and candidates with disabilities get free nomination forms. Forms were to be sold from 26 April to 6 May until the deadline was later extended to 10 May then 12 May. After the submission of nomination forms by 13 May, candidates were screened by a party committee on 14 and 15 May while 18 May was the date for the screening appeal process. Ward congresses and LGA congresses were set for 16 and 17 May to elect delegates for the primary. Candidates approved by the screening process advanced to a primary set for 27 May, in concurrence with other APC senatorial primaries; challenges to the result could be made on 28 May.

On 30 May, a direct primary that ended with Titus Zam defeating two other candidates in a landslide.

APC primary results
Party	Candidate	Votes	%
APC	Titus Zam	147,151	91.86%
APC	Dave Awunah	6,821	4.26%
APC	Benjamin Adanyih	6,209	3.88%
Total votes		160,181	100.00%
Invalid or blank votes		0	N/A
Turnout		160,181	69.69%

==== People's Democratic Party ====
On 16 March 2022, the national PDP announced its senatorial primary timetable, setting its expression of interest form price at ₦1 million and the nomination form price at ₦20 million with a 50% discount for candidates between 25 and 30. Forms were to be sold until 1 April but the party later extended the deadline four times before reaching a final deadline of 22 April. After the submission of nomination forms by 25 April, candidates were screened by a party committee on 27 April while 2 May was the rescheduled date for the screening appeal process. Ward congresses were set for 29 April and LGA congresses were rescheduled for 10 May to elect delegates for the primary. Candidates approved by the screening process advanced to a primary set for 23 May, in concurrence with other PDP senatorial primaries but due to often violently enforced Monday stay-at-home orders by separatists, southeastern state parties held their primaries on 24 May; challenges to the result could be made on 25 May.

Weeks before the primary, Orker-Jev declined to run for re-election in favour of outgoing Governor Samuel Ortom's senatorial ambition. On the primary date, Ortom was nominated unopposed at the venue in Makurdi. After the vote, Ortom thanked the people of the district and pledged to continue good representation.

=== Campaign ===
In review of the campaign in December 2022, reporting from The Nation observed regional elements to the election as Ortom's feud with PDP National Chairman Iyorchia Ayu reflected on their native communities as Ortom is a Jemgba Tiv while Ayu is a Minda Tiv. Another key factor noted was the ability of Ortom to use the power of his state government to help campaigning. In a piece later that month from The Punch, reporting indicated that Ortom had met with several Minda Tiv community leaders to gain their support while Zam had been hindered by the rising candidacy of Mark Gbillah (LP)—a MHR who, like Zam, originates from Gwer West LGA. A piece from The Africa Report in January also noted regional sentiments and Gwer West vote splitting but focused more so on the Ortom versus former Governor George Akume dynamic. An analyst claimed "Zam is Akume's candidate" and thus the election was labeled effectively a contest between Ortom and Akume.

In the fortnight prior to the election, the election came to national attention when Ortom endorsed Peter Obi in the presidential election on 17 February 2023. While it was notable as he became the first incumbent governor to endorse Obi, in terms of the senatorial election, Ortom became in danger of internal PDP sanction due to the endorsement. Despite this threat, Ortom claimed that he was "sacrifice [his] senatorial ambition" for Obi's campaign. Pundits noted the oddity of Ortom endorsing Obi while competing against Gbillah in addition to the rising popularity of APC gubernatorial nominee Hyacinth Alia.

=== General election ===
==== Results ====
2023 Benue North-West Senatorial District election
Party	Candidate	Votes	%
ADP	John Bosco Tyozenda		
ADC	Celestine Orbunde		
APC	Titus Zam		
APGA	Orahii Tertsea		
LP	Mark Gbillah		
New Nigeria Peoples Party	Aondoaver Francis Ako		
PRP	Godwin Terna Tile		
PDP	Samuel Ortom		
SDP	John Bosco Maria Tyozenda		
Total votes			100.00%
Invalid or blank votes			N/A
Turnout			

== Benue South ==
2023 Benue South Senatorial District election
- 25 February 2023
Nominee	Daniel Onjeh	Joseph Ojobo	Patrick Abba Moro
Party	APC	LP	PDP
Senator before election
Patrick Abba Moro
PDP
Elected Senator
To be determined
To be determined

The Benue South Senatorial District covers the local government areas of Ado, Agatu, Apa, Obi, Ogbadibo, Ohimini, Oju, Okpokwu, and Otukpo. The district is often referred to as "Zone C" and is also noted for its population of predominantly ethnic Idoma and Igede peoples. The incumbent Patrick Abba Moro (PDP), who was elected with 48.6% of the vote in 2019, is seeking re-election.

=== Primary elections ===
==== All Progressives Congress ====
On 20 April 2022, the APC National Executive Committee announced the party's schedule for senatorial primaries, setting its expression of interest form price at ₦3 million and nomination form price at ₦17 million with a 50% discount for candidates younger than 40 while women and candidates with disabilities get free nomination forms. Forms were to be sold from 26 April to 6 May until the deadline was later extended to 10 May then 12 May. After the submission of nomination forms by 13 May, candidates were screened by a party committee on 14 and 15 May while 18 May was the date for the screening appeal process. Ward congresses and LGA congresses were set for 16 and 17 May to elect delegates for the primary. Candidates approved by the screening process advanced to a primary set for 27 May, in concurrence with other APC senatorial primaries; challenges to the result could be made on 28 May.

On 30 May, a direct primary that ended with activist Daniel Onjeh defeating four candidates in a landslide. In Onjeh's acceptance speech, he called on the party to unite behind him as its nominee.

APC primary results
Party	Candidate	Votes	%
APC	Daniel Onjeh	127,090	95.77%
APC	Austin Oleho	2,917	2.20%
APC	Nelson Alapa	1,313	0.99%
APC	Jacob Ajene	1,016	0.77%
APC	Ejeh Joseph Ekwote	364	0.27%
Total votes		132,700	100.00%
Invalid or blank votes		0	N/A
Turnout		132,700	66.50%

==== People's Democratic Party ====
On 16 March 2022, the national PDP announced its senatorial primary timetable, setting its expression of interest form price at ₦1 million and the nomination form price at ₦20 million with a 50% discount for candidates between 25 and 30. Forms were to be sold until 1 April but the party later extended the deadline four times before reaching a final deadline of 22 April. After the submission of nomination forms by 25 April, candidates were screened by a party committee on 27 April while 2 May was the rescheduled date for the screening appeal process. Ward congresses were set for 29 April and LGA congresses were rescheduled for 10 May to elect delegates for the primary. Candidates approved by the screening process advanced to a primary set for 23 May, in concurrence with other PDP senatorial primaries but due to often violently enforced Monday stay-at-home orders by separatists, southeastern state parties held their primaries on 24 May; challenges to the result could be made on 25 May.

On May 28, four candidates contested an indirect primary that ended with Moro winning renomination after results showed him defeating Hassan Anthony Saleh by a significant margin.

PDP primary results
Party	Candidate	Votes	%
PDP	Patrick Abba Moro	179	58.31%
PDP	Hassan Anthony Saleh	72	23.45%
PDP	Joseph Ojobo	53	17.26%
PDP	Bright Ogaji	3	0.98%
Total votes		307	100.00%

=== Campaign ===
In a December 2022 campaign analysis article, The Punch labeled Moro as the frontrunner while Onjeh and Joseph Ojobo (LP) were noted as other major candidates.

=== General election ===
==== Results ====
2023 Benue South Senatorial District election
Party	Candidate	Votes	%
ADP	Anne Enye Adegbe		
ADC	Ujah Matthew Onoja		
APC	Daniel Onjeh		
APGA	Madaki Jerry Omakwu		
LP	Joseph Ojobo		
New Nigeria Peoples Party	Isaac Jerome Idu		
PRP	Iyah Iyah		
PDP	Patrick Abba Moro		
SDP	Itodo F. Idoko		
ZLP	Simon Ocheme Ogbe		
Total votes			100.00%
Invalid or blank votes			N/A
Turnout			

== See also ==
- 2023 Nigerian Senate election
- 2023 Nigerian elections
