= Ugbokolo =

- Town
- Location within Nigeria
- Coordinates: 07°9′31″N 07°47′55″E
- Country: Nigeria
- State: Benue State
- LGA: Okpokwu
- District: Edumoga

Government
  - Type: Chieftaincy
- Elevation: 218 m (715 ft)
- Time zone: UTC+01:00 (WAT)
- Postal code: 973106
- ISO 3166 code: NG-BN
- Climate: Aw

Ugbokolo is a town in Okpokwu Local Government Area of Benue State in the Middle Belt region of Nigeria. It is an Idoma speaking town located in the district of Edumoga in Okpokwu Local Government Area. The postal code of the area is 973106.

== Educational Institutions ==
The region is home to numerous primary and secondary schools that provide quality education to the younger generation. Additionally, the Benue State Polytechnic, formerly known as Murtala College of Arts, Science, and Technology, offers higher education opportunities in various fields.

== Notable people ==
- Ameh Ebute (former), President of the Senate of Nigeria
- Comrade Abba Moro (former), Federal Minister of Interior of Nigeria
- Hon. Simon Ofikwu (former), member of the Benue State House of Assembly

== See also ==
- List of villages in Benue State
