= List of villages in Benue State =

This is a list of villages in Benue State, Nigeria organised by local government area (LGA) and district, with postal codes also given.

== By postal code ==
LGA	District	Postal code	Villages
Ado	Agila	973109	Agbekpu; Agila; New Agila; Agwu; Ai-Amidu; Ai-Ogbola; Ai-Unazi; Aikpiliogwu; Aizu; Akpa Centre; Akpoge; Anjotsu; Anmeta; Efoha; Efofu; Ibende; Igbizi; Ikpeba; Ikpilogwu; Ivetse; Oda; Ogbegbera; Ogbilolo; Ogbokwu; Ogebee; Oglede; Oje Otaje; Okpakor; Okpatobo; Okwo; Onogwu; Opwa; Osalemu; Osudu; Ote-Ogbeche; Otokilo; Udegu; Udegu Urisi; Udegu-Ai-Osa-Kpoma; Udegu-Akpo; Udokwu-Agarada
Ado	Utonkon	973110	Abey; Adaboa; Adochi; Atuolo; Ayaga; Efelo; Enjoji; Igba; Ijokoro; Ikpatene; Ikpomolokpo; Jalili; Ndekma; Ndogaba; Obe; Odurukwu; Ogedegi; Ogi; Ojenyo; Ojije; Okari; Okonoji; Okpudu; Okwasi; Olukpo; Osiloko; Rijo; Royongo; Udebo-Ukwonyo; Ugede; Ukwonyo; Unwege-Igba; Unweje-Rijo; Utonkon; Wunikpo; Wurechi
Ado	Igumale	973107	Abakpa; Ai-Ameh; Ai-Ebiega; Ai-Onazi; Ai-AdaakaAi-Agbo; Elikizi; Etenyi; Igah; Igedde; Ijigbam; Ikponkpon; Ogbee; Ogongo; Olekwu; Osabo; Osipi; Osukpo; Oturukpo
Ado	Ulayi	973108	Abisunya; Achibila; Adegime; Agom; Ai-Oga; Ai-Okpam; Ebera; Efopfu; Ehaje; Ichesi; Idobi; Ijigboli; Ikpole; Ipole; Izigban; Ofunaga; Ogongo; Ojeba; Okpe; Omogwu; Ugbala; Ulayi
Agatu	Agatu	972108	Ankpa; Abalichi; Abogbe; Adagbo; Adana; Adum; Agbachi; Agbaduma; Aila; Aiyele-Igaisu; Akele; Akolo; Akpeko; Akwu; Ashama; Atakpa; Ayele; Ebete; Edeje; Egba; Egwuma; Ekwo; Elo; Engla; Enjima; Enogaje; Enugba; Ichogolugwu-Ogwule-; Idahuna; Igagisu; Ikele-Gochi; Ikpele ope; Ikpole; Obagaji; Obanowa; Odejo; Ogam; Ogbangede; Ogbaulu; Ogufa; Ogwule-Kaduna; Ogwule-Ugbaulu; Ogwule-Ugbokpo; Ogwumegbo; Ojomachi; Okeji; Okokolo; Okpachenyi; Okpagabi; Okpokoto; Olegoga; Olekochologba; Olobidu; Ologabulu; Ologobenyi; Olomachi; Omokwodi-Edeje; Onitsha; Onugbo; Oweto; Ugba; Ugboju-Ube; Ukadu; Usagbudu; Usha; Utugolugu
Apa	Ochekwu	972107	Achaba; Adija; Ahija; Ajube-Icho; Ajugbe-Echaje; Akpaniho; Akpanta; Akpete; Akpoloko; Alifeti; Amoke; Angwa; Ankapli; Auke; Auke-Geri; Bapa; Ebukodo; Edikwu-Icho; Ekela; Ibadum; Idada; Iga-Okpaya; Iga-Ologbeche; Igoro; Ijaha; Ijege; Ikampu; Ikobi Ugbobi; Ikor; Imana; Inyapu; Jericho; Jos; Kaduna; Oba; Obinda; Obuleha; Ochenmo; Ochichi-Ologiri; Ochinchi-Olaji; Ochumekwu; Odejo; Ododo-Ajaje; Odugbeho; Odugbo; Ofoko; Ogbenegwu; Ogbonoko; Ogebe; Ogodo; Ogoduma; Ohoke; Oiji; Ojantele; Ojecho; Ojeke; Ojide; Ojuloko; Okpakachi; Okpeme; Okpoda; Okpokwu; Okwoho; Okwuji; Ola Kamonye; Oladu; Oleitodoakpa; Olekele; Olete; Olobaidu; Olodoga; Ologba; Oloja; Olojo-Utukugwu; Oloko-Angbo; Olufene; Omelemu; Omogidi; Opah; Opanda; Otakpa; Oye; Ugbokpo; Zauku
Buruku	Kusuv	981107	Ako; Anshav; Awange; M-Ulav; Nkovul; Orahii; Sati; Shipine; Tavershima; Tom-Ataan; Tomanyiin; Tse-Abagi; Tse-Adingi; Tse-Akaa; Tse-Gbile; Tseyuna; Tyowanye; Wanvambe
Buruku	Mbagen	981110	Abor; Abwa; Adyongo; Agine; Ajohol; Akume; Anchiha; Anongur; Ashibi; Ato; Bako; Garuba; Gbelave; Gbudu; Idyua; Leghem; Nyamatsor; Shie; Tofi; Upe; Zua
Buruku	Mbalagh	981106	Abuku; Agbengi; Agwabi; Agyo-Ugbu; Ajige; Amaa Ihunda; Aminde; Apinega; Ashinya; Awusa-Pila; Chijije; Dogo; Gbanyam; Igyu; Kwaghnihia; Mbager; Ortse; Sev-Av; Tabe; Tsende; Uga; Ugangese
Buruku	Mbatie	981105	Ayunghitse; Biliji; Bukufu; Buruku; Dzer; Gbaja; Haanya; Kur; Mbatie; Nyibom; Tomahar; Tomataan; Tsetyo; Tyogbenda; Usen
Buruku	Shorov	981109	Akpara; Garagboughul; Ityowanye; Kaimon; Tse-Kur; Tse-Usaka
Buruku	Utur	981108	Abakor; Abakwa; Damkor; Iorigye; Uter
Gboko	Gboko (Rural)	981101	Gboko
Gboko	Ipav	981103	Ador; Ahwa; Akaajime; Amaladu; Anikyov; Anyego; Bay; Gatie; Ikyuen; Itungwa; Maseje; Mbaamandev; Missa; Mkar; Naga; Tse-Gatie; Tse-Kagher; Tse-Mkovur
Gboko	Mbatiav	981111	Luga; Igbesue; Foga; Adoom; Akawe; Akpagher; Anihundu; Ayom; Byer; Dio; Dur; Eoyum; Ergum; Gwaza; Igbabjor; Igbajor; Ikpenger; Ikumbul; Kyavel; Lough; Pika; Tarbo; Tarkoo; Tiv; Tze-Ademate; Uga; Uve; Vamkyongo; Ujon; Tse-Agbadu
Gboko	Mbatierev	981112	Agayo; Asokwo; Aumazwa; Hemen; Ibyu-Yo; Ikpa; Jirkyegh; Kukwa (Mba-Adumbe); Kusuv; Luga; Mbake; Mperigu
Gboko	Mbayion	981104	Abia; Adaa; Agam; Agbile; Agom; Akaa; Ande (Atondo); Andoor; Arua; Atuur; Bunde; Buter; Feda-Atzetan; Gaando; Ihule; Ilungwa-Not; Ishar; Kankyer; Kumugh; Mkilim; Shenge; Songo; Tse-Abo; Tse-Ademate; Tse-Orya; Tyodugh; Woihyev; Aditogola; Mkanan; Igyula-Mbahyande; Apine-Mbamter; Atonko; Anema;
Gboko	Yandev	981102	Apeinumbu; Bya Bya; Genyi; Gyase; Ibyabya; Kyado; Mbadeda; Mbaluka; Mbaniongo; Mbatie; Orpin Village; Tarukpe; Tse-Akene; Tse-Jor House; Tyavgar House; Tyekwu; Yandev
Guma	Mbaawa	970102	Atawa; Gyushage; Jugudu
Guma	Mbabai	970103	Ikoanenge; Ortserga; Tse-Tule; Uikpam
Guma	Mbagwen	970105	Nalegh; Talvough; Yogbo
Guma	Mbasaan	970104	Antso; Cheakiyne; Gogo; Ichergbe; Ijoh; Iye; Kaseyo; Peregh; Torkula; Toura; Tse-Akenyi; Ubo; Ukaa; Umenger; Yeshewe
Guma	Uyiev	970106	Achakpa; Anakuma; Angudu; Daudu; Madaki; Magum; Nyiev; Sherev; Udei Branch; Yelewatta
Gwer East	Ingohov	971101	Abafakyai; Ainu; Aliade; Boko; Chia; Eron; Gbuka; Gigi; Mbaav Oju; Mbe; Ndom; Noal; Nougonoye; Okukukwu; Tse-Ogbe; Ukpute; Ullaim-Ulam
Gwer East	Njiriv	971102	Abwa; Acheche; Agono; Ajukum; Ameche; Aondoana; Ate; Azom; Dagi; Dura; Gaadi; Gari; Gbajimba; Howe; Ikygbajir; Kaahena; Maga; Mba; Mbajeri; Odusho; Orga; Ortserga; Ringa; Shawa; Taraku; Taraku Udugho; Tseboaga; Tseiko; Ugee; Ugee-Ugee; Ugesa; Uhou; Ukari; Ukpar; Unende; Zauka
Gwer East	Yonov	971105	Abiem; Abinsi; Adetsav; Aduku; Agbakwa; Agbede; Agena; Agute; Akawe; Awasir; Ayar; Ayati; Ayo Bajimba; Dogo; Ikpayongo; Iyanden; Kpam; Kudar; Kura; Mase; Mbaayande; Mbaiyur; Mbakaha; Mbamev; Mbasombo; Moi-Igbo; Nev; Ode; Shanna; Tesewadugh; Tse-Kyula; Tse-Punusha; Tse-Ushira; Tse-Vava; Tsejir; Yonov
Gwer West	Raav	971103	Achamegh; Achav; Achu; Kula; Adizenga; Adum; Agbakwa; Agboveyav; Akume; Aondona; Apenda; Awambe; Ayemegh; Deda; Gbande; Ginde; Jimba; Koti Akpoghur; Naka; Nyitom; Oga; Shaga; Tom Anyin; Tom Atar; Tse-Unzughul; Tsean; Uche; Udam; Usa
Gwer West	Mbakpa	971104	Abiah; Adudu; Agagbe; Agasha; Agberagba; Agusu; Anyamile; Api; Audu; Avine; Azon; Borkem; Byer; Chile; Enyer; Ewo; Gbanya; Gebe; Go; Ibor; Ichicadu; Ikyande; Inougu; Mabaiev; Mabchia; Mandaki; Nugi; Senjev; Tongov; Tse-Tor; Tyoatee; Tyulen; Ududu; Yagba; Yueho; Zeku
Konshisha	Mbavaa	971109	Aba; Abagi; Achoho; Aduu; Agen; Agera; Agerega; Agheede; Agidi; Akesa; Akputu; Amule; Ankaaye; Atingel; Atorkaan; Awajir; Awuhe; Ayeer; Azem; Bonta; Chia; Deke; Dio; Gbajema; Gbende; Gboho; Ichigh-ki-Mbakaha; Igbor; Iger; Ijov Ikundan; Iku Mbur; Ikyon; Ityogbeda; Jov; Kuaa; Ligon; Manta; Mbaakpur; Mbaikyu; Mbeagh; Nalegh; Nenge; Ortungu; Selagi
Konshisha	Shan-Gevtie	971110	Shiriki; Shom; Talvough; Tile; Tor Mkar; Tse-Agberagba; Tsue; Tyo-Tsar; Tyoate; Tyough; U-Avaande; Ugbaikyo; Unow; Ya-Akur; Yande; Yogbo
Kwande	Ikurav-Ya	982103	Achia; Adagi; Igon; Ikurav-ya; Ikyogen; Injiov; Mbaga; Newkkikie
Kwande	Nanev	982101	Adikpo; Ahile/Akende; Ahundu; Angir Uyough; Dio; Gever; Gube; Haanya; Ikyoor; Ityough; Iyon-Mbahav; Kende; Kookoko; Kuhe; Mbakuran Usar; Nambe; Tse-Apera; Tse-Gum-Mbayevikyaior; Tse-Zurgba; Yonge
Kwande	Shangev-Ya	982104	Ada; Ageraga; Ajio; Anatio; Atsortjaki; Gbajur; Ikume; Iohanga; Iyon; Koti-Mbaduku; Mbangough; Tise-Kwange; Uno; Upev-Adagi; Yaji
Kwande	Turan	982102	Abo; Amahundu; Anwase; Ayaga; Barakur; Boagundu; Geso; Ichor; Inundur; Jato-Aka; Kanem; Manayam; Manor; Nyihemba; Susu; Uniwach; Waya; Zel
Logo	Gaambe-Tiev	980107	Abeda; Agbum; Anyibe; Arege; Ayilamo; Dooshima; Ibukur; Igbogh; Ihungwa-Ihough; Iyorzua; Jootar; Lorja; Mchia; Mough; Shina; Tse-Chembe; Tse-Ighur; Tse-Jime; Tse-Melapa; Tse-Ngbian; Tse-Wande; Tyoban; Uze; Yomatar
Logo	Gaambe-Ya	980102	Abaji; Abako; Abega; Ada-Ayaijor; Agu-Centre; Ajungwa; Akella; Answen Agula; Anyom; Apeghan Ugo; Atumbe; Branch-Adamu; Branch-Kungu; Chenchenji; Gawa; Gbise; Gudu; Harga; Hindanigo Akyaa; Hunda Ado; Imande-Mbakange; Kasar; Kenvanger; Kuhe Goo; Mbakyer; Nagu; Ngokem; Peva; Sai; Tor-Donga; Tse-Avy Aye; Tse-Bavel; Tse-De; Tse-Hungwa; Tse-Hyambe; Tse-Kyal; Tse-Mayange; Tse-Nyigh; Tse-Pahal; Tse-Taava; Tse-Tsongo; Tse-Ugbar; Tse-Usha; Tse-Vav; Vingir
Logo	Kpav	980103	Aba; Abuda; Ada Adeun; Adi Village; Akai; Akegi; Ankum; Anongo Gbabul; Gbena; Gulgul; Hiitom; Ikpool; Ikyeagba; Imande Shikaan; Imbufu; Kumpa; Nomgo Abetze; Sati-Agirigi; Solozo; Tacha; Tse-Asongo; Tse-Bente; Tse-Igbe; Tse-Ukeji; Tsenongo; Ucha; Wendeya Tza
Logo	Kyuran-Tev	980101	Agahyande; Agber; Amber; Atumbir; Ayua; Azege; Bum; Joo-Mbatyough; Katsina-Ala; Kela; Mtser; Ngibo; Tse-Agakaa; Tse-Gber; Tse-Ibo; Tse-Waakaa
Logo	Mbaterem	980109	Agbaaye; Akaa; Apir Gwa; Ato Gbenda; Dyom; Kado; Kusugh Aber; Melabu; Pevkyaa; Tse-Dajo; Tse-Numbul; Udul Wankaa
Logo	Ngenev	980106	Agena; Alabar; Ayati; Kasar; Mabaamamdev; Mbamena; Oyom; Tine Nune; Tse-Achir; Tse-Adogo; Tse-Amaatimin; Tse-Amachigh; Tse-Ami; Tse-Anam; Tse-Ansambe; Tse-Baim; Tse-Bosua; Tse-Chehia; Tse-Kur; Tse-Orbunde; Tse-Orkpen; Tsemba; Uvva; Uyoo; Vande; Zaki-Biam
Logo	Tongov	980104	Adam; Ajia; Ajough; Aminde; Anyagba; Gbor; Geda; Gonduzua; Goyuse; Ikumbur; Imande Mbashonov; Itokyaa; Ityogbenda Udende; Kera; Moze; Nigbo; Tse-Ador; Tse-Alam; Tse-Bwaja; Tse-Makar; Tse-Tswar; Ubaya; Une; Utange; Yakyuu
Logo	Torov	980110	Gbagir; Guse Vaase; Kur; Tse-Alabor; Tse-Gyuba; Uke
Logo	Ugondo	980105	Abeda-Mbadyu; Aganyi; Akaa-Sekera; Amatso; Ambiir; Asom; Gbom; Gondo-Zue; Iorshagher; Jiji; Kyob; Mtseya; Saaku; Sonko; Time-Kyura; Tse-Agbumgu; Tse-Akaa; Tse-Akporaingbe; Tse-Aluor; Tse-Buaka; Tse-Tzenger; Tyogbenda; Ugba; Ukor; Usen; Uyoo; Wende; Zanzan
Makurdi	Makurdi (Rural)	970101	Adaka; Adeke; Agam; Agbadi; Agbeshir; Agenada; Akaan; Aki; Akigwe; Akpehe; Akume; Alla; Anter; Apir; Arawa; Azuu; Beetseh; Bogo; Chekwar; Eya; Ibume; Ikan; Isuahba; Iwa; Kachi; Kansihio; Nyam Sando; Nyirgir-Makurdi; Ongbo; Tatyough; Toighor; Tsuambu; Tsuwa; Tyodugh; Tyonambe; Ubebe; Uve; Wamkor; Yaiko; Zongo
Ogbadibo	Orokam	973104	Adum-Oko; Ai-Ona; Efoma; Ejema; Enyajuru; Ibiladu; Ikemu; Imeyi; Ipole-Adupi; Ipole-Ako; Ipole-Iyiru; Ipole-Oko; Itesi; Leke; Obenda; Ocheje; Ogwurute; Okparigbo; Olaigbena; Ole-Igwu; Oleche; Orokam; Oture; Ugbagba-Ako; Ugbogidi; Ukalegu-Igwu; Ukporo
Ogbadibo	Otukpa	973105	Abache; Abo; Adepe; Adum; Agbafu; Ago; Aikwu; Akpagidigbo; Alagiranu; Ari-Engweewu; Court-Otukpa; Ebari; Ebudu; Efeche; Efekwo; Effion; Efocho; Efugo; Eha-Otukpa; Eke-Ekwute; Epe-Agbo; Epeilo; Epeilo-Ikpoyi; Idede; Idiri; Idodoloko; Ijadoja; Ikregi; Ipari; Ipichicha; Ipiga; Ipole Abo; Ipu-Ugbogbo; Ipuchicha; Obu; Oda; Odoba; Odwebe; Ofojo; Ogaje; Ogene; Ogonkwu; Okoncheta; Olabekpa; Olachagbaha; Oladu; Olagwuche; Olamago; Oloche; Onchegbi; Orido; Oto; Otukpa; Owoso; Ubiegi; Udegi; Ugbamaka; Ugbogwu; Ugbokpo; Ukwo; Umarichi; Zaria
Ogbadibo	Owukpa	973103	Adu; Agira; Aiede; Aifam-Centre; Aiji; Alagarunu; Amejo; Anchimodo; Ankpa; Annachowga; Atamaka; Ati; Ebanna; Ebela; Ede; Eha-Uleke; Ehicho; Ehuhu; Ejaa; Ejule; Eke; Eke-Ai odu; Eke-Akpa; Elugu; Epiege; Eru; Eyere; Eyupi; Ibagba; Ibiti; Idogobe; Iga-Uroko; Ikwo; Ipole; Ipole-Aifam; Ipole-Aiuja; Ipole-Ekere; Ipole-Owukpa; Iwewe; Iwewe-Aiodu; Oderigbo; Ogbata; Ogbonoko; Ogichigodi; Ogwurutee; Okpoto; Okpudu; Olempe-Ogicho; Oma; Onyirada; Owukpa; Owuruwuru; Ubafu; Ubenjira; Ubono; Ugbokpo; Ugbugbu; Ukalegwu; Uko; Uleke; Umafu
Ohimini	Akpa	972101	Adankari; Adim; Ahanyo; Akwepa; Akwete; Allan; Atitio; Aturukpo; Egbla; Egbla Ndikwi; Egbla Nje; Ejo; Igbeji; Igbudeke; Isoo; Nachi; Obanyo; Odonto; Ofiloko; Ogwuche; Ogyoma; Ojigo; Okpenen; Omajaga; Omebe; Onyuwei; Otobi Camp
Ohimini	Oglewu	972103	Agbeke; Ai-Oga; Aigaji; Alagblanu; Amoda; Angue; Anwule; Atapa; Atlo; Awulema; Eboya; Ebu; Elulu; Enichi; Idabi; Ijaha; Ikila; Ochobo; Ochobo-Centre; Ojali; Ojano; Okete; Okete-Okpikwu; Olugbane; Omutelle; Onyepa; Otohia; Ukploko
Ohimini	Onyan-Gede	972104	Abakpa; Adankali; Agwa; Ajegbe; Anmaji; Anonomi; Ehatope; Enyioji; Epideru; Idekpa; Ikpolle; Ipiga; Iyanya; Odega; Ogande; Ogodu; Ogofu; Ondo; Otoje; Ugene; Ugene-Icho; Ughoju Ega; Ukpobi-Echaje; Ukpobi-Ichoi
Oju	Igede	971106	Adum; Adum-Okete; Ainu-Ette; Ameka; Anchim; Andibilla; Anyadegwu; Anyone; Anyuwogbu; Atekpe; Ebonda; Edumoga; Ega; Eja; Ekoti; Ekpong; Epwa-Ibilla; Ibegi; Ibillalukpo; Ichacho; Ichakobe; Idajo; Ihulam; Ikachi; Ikomi; Imoho; Itega; Itikpala; Iyeche; Oba-Ogebe; Obachita; Obi; Obigwe; Obijegwu; Obohu; Oboru; Obotu; Obubu; Obuza; Ochimode; Ochodu; Odubo; Oga-Olowa; Ogengeng; Ogogo; Ohio; Ohirigwe; Ohoho; Ohuma; Okpodom; Ojinyi; Oju; Okakongo; Okete; Okileme; Okonche; Okpinya; Okpoma; Omope; Onyike; Opoan; Orihi; Oshirigwe; Otakini; Otakpi; Otunche; Owori-Obotu; Oyiwo; Uchenyum; Uchwo; Ugburu; Ukpa; Ukpila; Ukpute; Umoda; Utabiji; Wori-Obotu
Oju	Ito	971108	Abelega; Abofutu; Adega; Adiko; Adodo; Adum West; Adum-East; Akiraba; Akunda; Ameka; Anchiomodoma; Any-Oko; Anyagwu; Anyichika; Ayoye; Ebong-Itogo; Echoro; Eewu; Ekingo; Igbegi; Igwe; Ijanke; Ijegwu; Ijokwe; Ikandiye; Ikiriye; Ikponyine; Ikwokwu; Inyuma; Ipinu-Adiko; Irabi; Itakpa; Ito; Itogo-Ekingo; Iyaho; Oba; Obigago; Ochinebe; Odeleko; Odiapa; Ogede; Ogilewu-Itogo; Ogoro; Ogwope; Ohehe; Ohuma; Ohuye; Ojantile; Ojegbe; Ojenya; Ojor; Ojuwo; Okpirikwu; Okpirikwu-Adum; Okpokwu; Okukukwu; Okuntegbe; Okwubi; Okwumaye; Otokwe; Owo; Owo-Adum; Oye-Obi; Oyinyi; Ubeke; Ubele; Udebor; Udegi; Ugbodom; Ukpuleru; Ukpute; Utugboji; Yeshewe
Oju	Uwokwu	971107	Adodo; Adum; Alloma; Anwu; Arigede; Ebenta; Egbilla-Idella; Egbilla-Izzi; Ekpete; Enugu-Oye; Enurn; Esewa; Ibalakum; Idele; Ifator; Igbegi; Igbella; Igbilla; Igwe-Ette; Igwoke; Ikatakwe; Ikoku; Ikori; Inyuma; Irachi; Itafor; Itakeni; Iyator; Iyokolo; Obaogede; Obene; Obiladun; Odaleko; Ogaka; Ogege; Ogori; Ojokwe; Okekpo; Okochi; Okwurum; Orihi; Otukpo-Oye; Owori-Ipinu; Oye; Ubeke; Uda; Udogwu; Uje; Ukpute
Okpokwu	Edumoga	973106	A-Adabulu; Adum; Agamud; Agbangwe; Agila-Oladikwu; Aiede; Ajide; Aiagom; Ogbulo, Akaga; Akpitodo-Akpaya; Akpodo; Akpuneje; Alaglanu; Amafu; Aokete; Aokpaneg; Aokpasu; Aokpe; Atekpo; Ebo-Ya; Ebodahubi; Edkeajio; Efede-Aoi; Efffa; Effion; Efoyo; Ejema; Ekenobi; Engle; Gapo; Igama; Ijeha; Ipoya; Iwewe; Laionyes; Obotu-Ehaje; Obotu-Icho; Obulu; Odaba; Oduda; Ogblega; Ogblo; Ogbodo; Ogene; Ogodum; Ogomotu; Ojigo; Okana; Okga-Ogodo; Okopolikpo-I; Okpafie; Okpale; Okpale-Otta; Okpilioho; Okpolikpo-Ehaje; Oladegbo; Olago; Olaidu; Olaioleje; Olanyega; Ojapo; Amoda Olengbecho; Ollo; Omolokpo; Omusu; Opidlo; Opioli; Otada-Otutu; Otobi; Ugbokolo; Ugbokpo
Okpokwu	Ichama	973102	Acho; Adiga; Adiga Oyira; Ejaa; Ichana; Ipele-Ohebe; Ipole-Aiagbo; Ipole-Aiebega; Ipole-Aikpe; Ipole-Aiona; Iwewe-Ichama; Ode-Sasa; Odokpo; Ojocha; Ojoga; Oleayidu; Oma
Okpokwu	Okpoga	973101	Agado; Agene; Ai-Anechi; Ai-Ochokpo; Aidogodo; Akpakpa; Amuju; Ede-Okpaga; Idiri; Idobe; Idoko-Aga; Ikonijo; Ogbaga; Ogwuche Akpa; Okadoga; Oklenyi; Okpoga; Okpudu; Olayi-Agbino
Otukpo	Adoka	972106	Abache; Adoka; Aibeli; Aichene; Aikolekwu; Aiobiduwa; Ajochoko; Alyeya; Anineju Ukwaba; Aukpa; Aune; Eeko; Ekantili; Ipole; Iwili; Obena; Ofiloko; Ogbago; Ogodum; Ogowu; Ojakpama; Ojanowa; Ojinebe; Oklenyi-Uga; Okpaflo; Okpannehe; Okpeje; Olakpoga; Olekpama; Oleogwoja; Oloke; Olokodeje; Onipi; Opah Adoka; Opah Aiokpetaa; Otada; Udabi; Uga; Ukplago; Umalichi; Umogidi; Upu
Otukpo	Otukpo (Rural)	972101	Adoka; Ajobe; Akpa; Akpachi-Ipepe; Akpachi-Ipole; Akpegede; Amla-Ehaje; Amla-Icho; Asa-Ehicho; Asa-Ehaje; Ebologba; Edikwu; Efa; Emichi; Idabi; Ife; Igbanonmaje; Ikobi; Ipakangwu; Itoo; Jericho; Obaganya; Odudaje; Ogome; Ojantelle; Okpamaju; Okpobeka; Olachinta; Olooja; Otada-Ehaje; Otada-Icho; Otobi-Otukpo; Otukpo-Icho; Otukpo-Nobi; Upu London; Upu-Icho
Otukpo	Ugboju	972105	Ai-Okpetu; Akpachi; Alaglanu; Angbier; Anwule; Aochemoche; Aokwu; Ebolo; Efeyi-Ankpa; Efeyi-Igbanonaje; Efeyi-Ipole; Emicho; Eyokpa; Ibaji; Ifete-Enumaje; Ifete-Ipana; Ifete-Olubie; Igahuwo; Igblagidi; Ipaha; Ipepe; Ipokpene; Ipolo-Ehaje; Ipolo-Ologbe; Ipom-Icho; Jericho; Obo; Obotu-Ehaje; Obotu-Icho; Odaubi; Oduda; Ofete-Olobele; Ofiloko; Ogobia; Ogoli; Ojegidigbe; Okoto; Okpligwu; Okwudu; Ola-Himu; Olegwaneku; Ombi-Ehaje; Ombi-Icho; Omulonye; Ona; Onaje; Owoto; Umalichi; Unwaba-Oju
Tarka	Mbakor	981113	Akoodo; Akpa-Agudo; Akpa-Ambajir; Amo; Asukunya; Chia; Iche Amazwa; Jingir; Kamken; Mbakor; Nyambee; Tarhembe; Tasbo; Uchi; Uku; Ukyo; Wannune; Zango-Wannune
Ukum	Ucha	980108	Afia; Amuta; Gbeji; Gyenku; Korwua Agbatar; Tse-Abenga; Tse-Abuul; Tse-Aliutse; Tse-Anchagbel; Tse-Anonogo-Or; Tse-Atsanga; Tse-Ayali; Tse-Azawe; Tse-Choko; Tse-Goji; Tse-Gube; Tse-Kulevbe; Tse-Kyenge; Tse-Mela; Tse-Oryango; Tse-Truga; Tse-Tyondo; Tse-Ukende; Vaase
Ushongo	Ikov	981118	Dughen; Gbaka; Hiiton Orbiam; Manor; Mbai-Igbaikyor; Sati; Tse-Abada; Tse-Gbinde; Tse-Sokpo; Ude; Uker
Ushongo	Mbagba	981115	Abia; Achuura; Agbuudu; Akile Village; Antiev Mbele; Atekombo; Aunde; Bage; Boikyaa; Buter; Chubu; Fiuji; Goge; Ichigh Iorliam; Igbee; Orihundu; Tse-Gbande; Tsumba; Yese
Ushongo	Mbaikyaa	981117	Gbatse; Hegha; Igbor; Ikpakpam; Korinjo; Nor; Tarungwa; Ushongo
Ushongo	Ushongo	981114	Abayol; Abuul; Adeeger; Adiga; Adikipo Mbaagwa; Agoyo; Akoko; Alu; Ameraga; Antyu; Atuuku; Banji; Ber-Agbum; Boor; Chubu; Danji; Ge-Mbayem; Gege; Ikyobo; Kartyo; Kwabula; Laadi; Lessel; Madugwu; Moti; Msa; Mtsenan; Posu; Tema; Terna; Tse-Nyagba; Tse-Pan-Anum; Tsedum; Tuamade; Tzongahar; Uazande; Uga; Ugondo; Uso; Waapera; Wajir; Wuha; Yaji; Yam
Ushongo	Utange	981116	Akerior; Gbinde; Ikyô-Azande; se-Gbor NingaT
Vandeikya	Mbaduku	982108	Abwa; Agbile; Betse; Chenge; Dagba; Gbe; Gbegba; Hembe; Ikpoikpo; Shan; Tile; Tsar
Vandeikya	Mbagbera	982107	Achwa; Adobi; Ahile Jime; Branch Atser; Gorkem; Gube; Jape; Mfor; Naa; Tse-Isua
Vandeikya	Mbaka-Ange	982105	Aginde; Ankar; Tse-Sho; Uganden; Vandeikya
Vandeikya	Mbara	982112	Abaki; Alagh-Ngulum; Alakali; Anongo; Bako; Gbagbongom; Igbee; Ihugh; Ivenge; Kiishi; Labe; Mandun; Mbaakon; Mede; Moji; Ndete; Tor-Tiv; Tse-Amough; Tse-Gedege; Tse-Ji; Uka
Vandeikya	Mbayongo	982109	Adamgbe; Agera; Agidi-Mbakena; Guda; Mbayongo; Shangbum; Tse-Atuul; Tse-Wande; Tyemimongo
Vandeikya	Mingev	982106	Agirgba; Bako; Korinya; Nor-Gemaityo
Vandeikya	Tsambe	982111	Adeiyongo; Ager; Atayo; Dav; Ifan; Kaamem; Lijam Mue; Nyaro; Tsambe; Tse-Anshungu; Tse-Nduul; Yaaya
Vandeikya	Ute	982110	Agu; Ako Abwa; Akofate; Anza Tokuyo; Bako; Koti-Yough; Kpamor; Kyoosu Ugo; Mbaakon; Pev; Sambe; Sati; Taatihi; Timbir; Tse-Dabo; Tse-Kase Nor; Tse-Kpum; Tse-Mker
