= Agila Town =

Coordinates: 7°48′0″N 7°39′0″E

Agila Town, located in the Ado local government area of Benue State, Nigeria, is the traditional home of the Agila people. Ado was established as a local government area in 1991. Nigeria, an independent country, is situated in West Africa.

The area comprises many settlements, which include Apa, Ivetse, Ikpenba, Agila, Ogbokwu, Udokwu and Odah. Apa was historically dominated by the Agilan who were not able to return to the main town after the Biafra War. Agila shares boundaries with Ebonyi State in the East, Enugu State in the West and Igumale, the Local Government headquarters in the North. River Ado is the boundary between Agila and Igumale.

Ado is one of the 9 local government areas in the southern senatorial zone, which is mainly occupied by the Idoma people. The administrative headquarters are at Igumale, situated on the railway line crossing Nigeria in the north–south direction.

Chief Dan Agbese, the Editor-in-Chief of Nigerian Newswatch, is from this area.

== Economy ==
The area contains minerals and natural resources, such as limestone, kaolin, petroleum, and coal in commercial quantities. The Benue state cement factory, one of the largest employers in this geographical region, was to be located there.

== Demographics ==
It is a culturally rich and diverse area comprising the Agila/Apa, Ulayi, Ijigbam, Utonkon, and Igumale communities.

== Education ==
It was one of the first areas in Idoma to have contact with European missionaries, and they began their first missionary school in this area. Igumale is also the proposed location of Apa State University.

== Notable people ==
- Mike Onoja
- John Aboh, former Managing Director & CEO of Oceanic Bank International Plc.
- Chief Dan Agbese, the Editor-in-Chief of Nigerian Newswatch
- Prince Edwin Unazi Ochai, founder of Agila Social and Economic Carnival and John Onoja Jr, a student of political science with Nasarawa state university Keffi.
