= 2019 Nigerian House of Representatives elections in Benue State =

The 2019 Nigerian House of Representatives elections in Benue State was held on February 23, 2019, to elect members of the House of Representatives to represent Benue State, Nigeria.

== Overview ==
Affiliation	Party				Total
Affiliation	APC	APGA	LP	PDP	Total
Before Election	6	0	0	5	11
After Election	1	3	1	6	11

== Summary ==
District	Incumbent	Party	Elected Rep	Party
Ado/Obadigbo/Opkokwu	Adabah Christian	PDP	Francis Agbo	PDP
Apa/Agatu	Ochepo Adamu	PDP	Godday Samuel	LP
Buruku	Orker-jev Yisa	APC	Kpam Sokpo	PDP
Gboko/Tarka	John Dyegh	APC	John Dyegh	APC
Guma/Makurdi	Dickson Tarkighir	APC	Benjamin Mzondu	PDP
Gwer East/Gwer West	Mark Gbillah	APC	Mark Gbillah	PDP
Katsina-Ala/Ukum/Logo	Memga Emmanuel	PDP	Richard Gbande	PDP
Konshisha/Vandeikya	Herman Hembe	APC	Herman Hembe	APGA
Kwande/Ushongo	Iorember Wayo	APC	Robert Tyough	PDP
Oju/Obi	Aja Samson	PDP	David Ogewu	APGA
Otukpo/Ohimini	Awulu Adaji	PDP	Blessing Onuh	APGA

== Results ==
=== Ado/Obadigbo/Opkokwu ===
A total of 5 candidates registered with the Independent National Electoral Commission to contest in the election. PDP candidate Francis Agbo won the election, defeating APC Michael Unogwu and 3 other party candidates. Agbo received 57.65% of the votes, while Unogwu received 30.20%.

2019 Nigerian House of Representatives election in Benue State
Party	Candidate	Votes	%
PDP	Francis Agbo	29,340	57.65%
APC	Abdulfatai Adeyemi	15,371	30.20%
Others		6,181	12.15%
Total votes		50,892	100%
PDP hold			

=== Apa/Agatu ===
A total of 9 candidates registered with the Independent National Electoral Commission to contest in the election. LP candidate Godday Samuel won the election, defeating PDP Adamu Entonu and 7 other candidates. Samuel received 34.83% of the votes, while Entonu received 34.07%.

2019 Nigerian House of Representatives election in Benue State
Party	Candidate	Votes	%
LP	Godday Samuel	11,109	34.83%
PDP	Adamu Entonu	10,867	34.07%
Others		9,920	31.10%
Total votes		31,896	100%
LP hold			

=== Buruku ===
A total of 12 candidates registered with the Independent National Electoral Commission to contest in the election. PDP candidate Kpam Sokpo won the election, defeating APC Joseph Ityav and 10 other party candidates. Sokpo received 50.64% of the votes, while Ityav received 33.26%.

2019 Nigerian House of Representatives election in Benue State
Party	Candidate	Votes	%
PDP	Kpam Sokpo	20,804	50.64%
APC	Joseph Ityav	13,664	33.26%
Others		6,618	16.11%
Total votes		41,086	100%
PDP hold			

=== Gboko/Tarka ===
A total of 9 candidates registered with the Independent National Electoral Commission to contest in the election. APC candidate John Dyegh won the election, defeating PDP Bernard Nenger and 7 other candidates. Dyegh received 56.90% of the votes, while Nenger received 42.36%.

2019 Nigerian House of Representatives election in Benue State
Party	Candidate	Votes	%
APC	John Dyegh	48,239	56.90%
PDP	Bernard Nenger	35,916	42.36%
Others		623	0.73%
Total votes		84,778	100%
APC hold			

=== Guma/Makurdi ===
A total of 10 candidates registered with the Independent National Electoral Commission to contest in the election. PDP candidate Benjamin Mzondu won the election, defeating APC Conrad Utaan and 8 other candidates. Mzondu received 50.82% of the votes, while Conrad Utaan received 38.02%.

2019 Nigerian House of Representatives election in Benue State
Party	Candidate	Votes	%
PDP	Benjamin Mzondu	50,454	50.82%
APC	Conrad Utaan	37,743	38.02%
Others		11,079	11.16%
Total votes		99,276	100%
PDP hold			

=== Gwer East/Gwer West ===
A total of 9 candidates registered with the Independent National Electoral Commission to contest in the election. PDP candidate Mark Gbillah won the election, defeating APC Victor Torsar and 7 other party candidates. Gbillah received 61.56% of the votes, while Torsar received 33.02%.

2019 Nigerian House of Representatives election in Benue State
Party	Candidate	Votes	%
PDP	Mark Gbillah	32,249	61.56%
APC	Ademola Omotoso	17,298	33.02%
Others		2,841	5.42%
Total votes		52,388	100%
PDP hold			

=== Katsina-Ala/Ukum/Logo ===
A total of 19 candidates registered with the Independent National Electoral Commission to contest in the election. PDP candidate Richard Gbande won the election, defeating APC Solomon Wombo and 17 other party candidates. Gbande received 46.60% of the votes, while Wombo received 21.79%.

2019 Nigerian House of Representatives election in Benue State
Party	Candidate	Votes	%
PDP	Richard Gbande	54,573	46.60%
APC	Solomon Wombo	25,524	21.79%
Others		37,020	31.61%
Total votes		117,117	100%
PDP hold			

=== Konshisha/Vandeikya ===
A total of 13 candidates registered with the Independent National Electoral Commission to contest in the election. APGA candidate Herman Hembe won the election, defeating APC Dorathy Mato and 11 other party candidates. Hembe received 39.75% of the votes, while Mato received 33.07%.

2019 Nigerian House of Representatives election in Benue State
Party	Candidate	Votes	%
APGA	Herman Hembe	35,187	39.75%
APC	Dorathy Mato	29,280	33.07%
Others		24,074	27.19%
Total votes		88,541	100%
PDP hold			

=== Kwande/Ushongo ===
A total of 13 candidates registered with the Independent National Electoral Commission to contest in the election. PDP candidate Robert Tyough won the election, defeating APC Benjamin Wayo and 11 other party candidates. Tyough received 41.23% of the votes, while Wayo received 29.10%.

2019 Nigerian House of Representatives election in Benue State
Party	Candidate	Votes	%
PDP	Robert Tyough	34,439	41.23%
APC	Benjamin Wayo	24,306	29.10%
Others		24,776	29.66%
Total votes		83,521	100%
PDP hold			

=== Oju/Obi ===
A total of 13 candidates registered with the Independent National Electoral Commission to contest in the election. APGA candidate David Ogewu won the election, defeating PDP Samson Aja and 11 other party candidates. Ogewu received 50% of the votes, while Aja received 26.41%.

2019 Nigerian House of Representatives election in Benue State
Party	Candidate	Votes	%
APGA	David Ogewu	12,794	50%
PDP	Michael Okunlade	6,759	26.41%
Others		6,037	23.59%
Total votes		25,590	100%
APGA hold			

=== Otukpo/Ohimini ===
A total of 13 candidates registered with the Independent National Electoral Commission to contest in the election. APGA candidate Blessing Onuh won the election, defeating PDP Egli Ahubi and 11 other party candidates. Onuh received 47.43% of the votes, while Ahubi received 33.71%.

2019 Nigerian House of Representatives election in Benue State
Party	Candidate	Votes	%
APGA	Blessing Onuh	24,665	47.27%
PDP	Egli Ahubi	16,725	32.05%
Others		10,788	20.68%
Total votes		52,178	100%
APGA hold			
