= Mike Onoja =

Nigerian politician and entrepreneur (b. 1948)

Mike Okibe Onoja
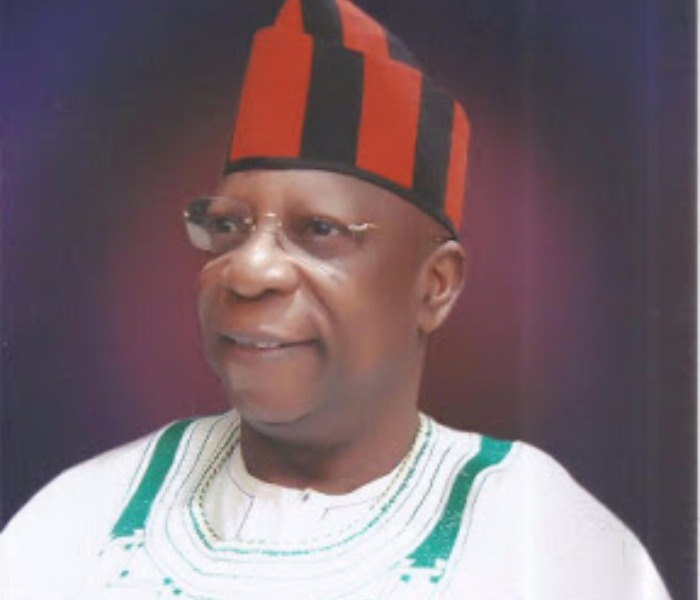
- Education: Ahmadu Bello University, Zaria; University of Colorado, USA; Williams College, Massachusetts USA
- Notable work: The Living Seed
- Political party: People's Democratic Party (Nigeria)
- Spouse: Justina Onoja
- Honours: Commander of the Order of the Niger (CON) Honorary Doctor of Management Science from the University of Mkar
- Website: http://www.mikeonoja.com/

Mike Okibe Onoja is a Nigerian businessman, Former Defacto Minister of Defence 1993-1999, federal republic of Nigeria and a public administrator from Ado LGA, Benue state. He also holds chieftaincy title as the Akanaba K'Idoma.

== Education ==
Mike Okibe Onoja was educated at a Roman Catholic mission school in the Agila district, beginning in 1954. He left for the Methodist Central School, Igumale, for a year before leaving for Saint Mary's Primary School, Otukpo, where he completed his primary education in 1961. He then attended Saint James Junior Seminary, Keffi, in 1962, graduating in 1966.

In 1969, he was admitted to Ahmadu Bello University (ABU), Zaria, where he studied economics, graduating in 1972. He later embarked on a Diploma program in Econometrics at the University of Colorado in 1975. Mike Onoja obtained his master's degree in development economics from Williams College in Massachusetts in 1976.

== Career ==
Mike Onoja's first job was as an account clerk in John Holt PLC, Jos, from 1967 to 1969. He worked at various government ministries, including the Federal Ministry of National Planning, Federal Ministry of Transport, Federal Ministry of Industries, and Ministry of Defence. He began his public service career in the Federal Ministry of Budget and National Planning in 1972 as a planning officer. After undertaking a course in the US, he was promoted to senior planning officer in 1976, and in 1979 to Principal Planning Officer. After a year, he was promoted to Chief Planning Officer. After the military coup of the Muhammadu Buhari regime, Onoja was transferred to the Federal Ministry of Transport as an undersecretary and later he was promoted to the Deputy Secretary. He was transferred to the Federal Ministry of Industries, now called the Federal Ministry of Industry, Trade, and Investment, in 1984.

In the same year, he was transferred to Special Military Tribunal, Kaduna zone, as the secretary of the tribunal. He was reassigned to the Ministry of Defence and deployed to the army department as the deputy secretary and later promoted to principal secretary in 1987, and to deputy director of the Ministry of Defence in 1990 and was further promoted to director in 1992 by the Minister of Defence, Sani Abacha. In 1994, he was promoted to director general / permanent secretary of the Ministry of Defence. He remained in the Ministry of Defence until 1999, when he was transferred to the Ministry of Power and Steel. His next stop was the Office of the Secretary to the Government of the Federation as the Permanent Secretary on Economic Affairs, where he remained until 2001. He later returned to the Federal Ministry of Budget and National Planning and retired from the civil service in 2003. During his career, he attended United Nations sessions in New York from 1988 to 1999. He attended meetings of the United Nations Trade and Development (UNCTAD) and the Group of 77 in Arusha, Tanzania. He also attended and represented the Federal Ministry of Budget and National Planning on ECOWAS meetings between 1978 and 1980.

== Politics ==
Mike Onoja entered politics in 2007 when he entered the primary election for governorship in Benue State under the ruling People's Democratic Party, against Gabriel Suswam, Steven Lawani, and Patrick Abba Moro. He ran again with the same party in 2015 in the Benue South Senatorial primary election, but later left the race for Senator David Mark, who was the incumbent Senate President at the time, to best serve the interests of the Idoma nation.

After the defeat of the People's Democratic Party at the 2015 general election by the All Progressives Congress, he and other politicians of the People's Democratic Party defected to the All Progressives Congress in 2016. He returned to the People's Democratic Party in the run-up to the 2019 Benue south Senatorial election. After the PDP's Senatorial Primary election in 2018, Mike Onoja again defected from the party to the Social Democratic Party after expressing his dissatisfaction with the PDP's conduct of the primary election.

== Awards ==
Mike Onoja was conferred the honour of Commander of the Order of the Niger (CON) in 1999 by General Abdulsalami Abubakar. In 2009, he was conferred with an Honorary Doctor of Management Science (D.Sc.) Honoris Causa from the University of Mkar. In 2017, University of Abuja in its 21st Convocation ceremony honoured him with a Doctor of Letters Degree. Benue State University, Makurdi, conferred on him another doctorate degree in the same year.
