= Agbado =

Agbado may refer to some places in Africa:

== Benin ==
- Agbado, Benin, a village in Collines Department

== Nigeria ==
- Agbado, Ekiti, a village in Ekiti State
- Agbado, Kogi (or Agbedde), a village in Kogi State
- Agbado-Oke Odo, a Local Council of Ifako-Ijaiye, a suburban city-district of Lagos
- Agbadi, a village in Benue State
