= Terseer Ugbor =

Nigerian politician (born 1981)

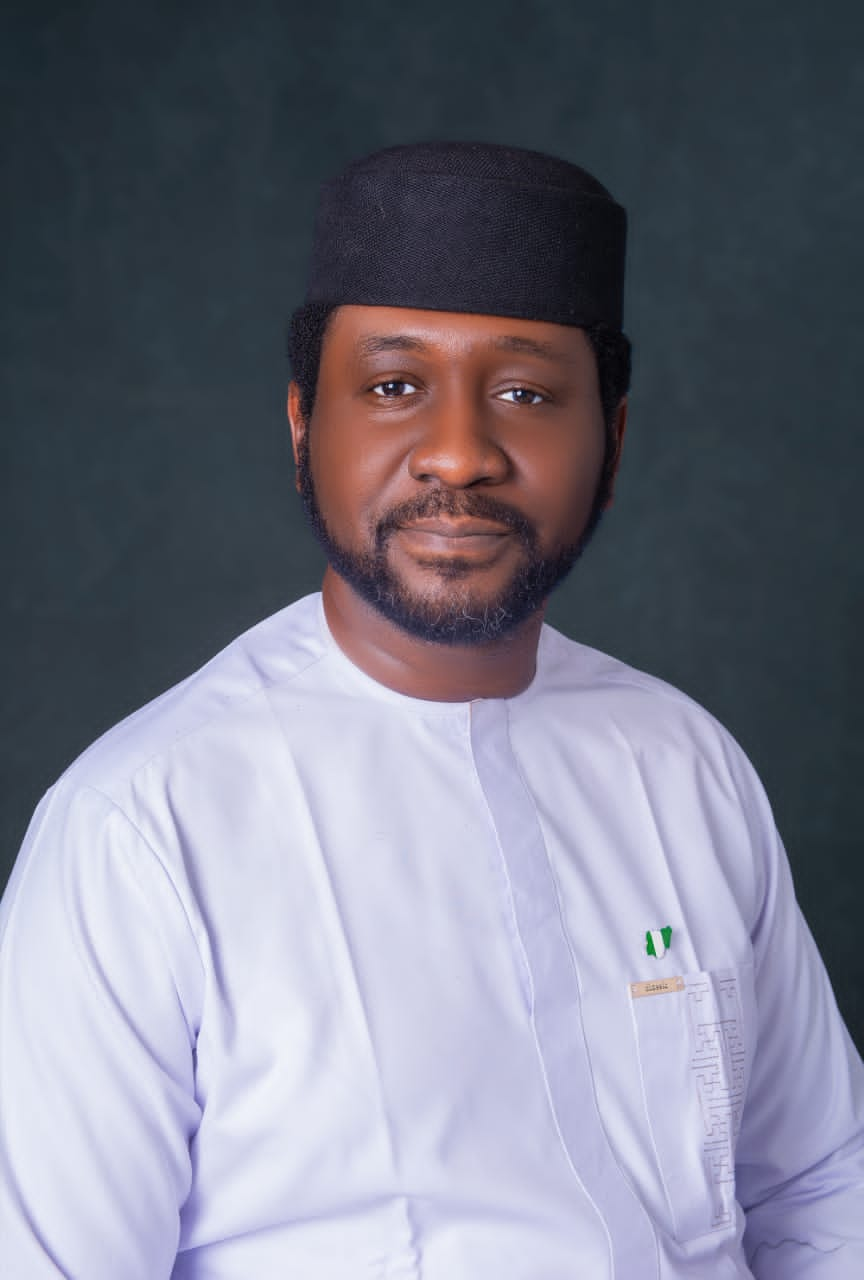

Member of the Nigerian House of Representatives from Benue State
- Incumbent
- Assumed office 13 June 2023
- Preceded by: Robert Tyough
- Constituency: Kwande / Ushongo

Personal details
- Born: 20 May 1981 (age 44)
- Party: All Progressives Congress (APC)
- Committees: Deputy Chairman House Committee on Environment Chairman Ad-Hoc Committee on student loans Member House Standing Committees on Aviation, Petroleum Midstream, Ecological Funds, Public Procurement, Steel Development, Public Service Matters and Poverty Alleviation

Terseer Ugbor (born 20 May 1981) is the current member, House of Representatives for Kwande/Ushongo Federal Constituency of Benue State. He is Deputy Chairman, House Committee on Environment and also the Chairman of the Ad-hoc Committee on Students Loans in Nigeria. He is also a Member of the House Standing committees on Aviation, Petroleum Midstream, Ecological Funds, Public Procurement, Steel Development, Public Service Matters and Poverty Alleviation.

As a Member of the House of Representatives, Hon. Ugbor is an advocate for improved funding to support Climate Change mitigation and adaptation efforts in his constituency (Kwande/Ushongo) and Nigeria at large. He seeks to implement environmentally impactful projects in clean technologies that help in energy transition for rural communities and protects our environment from pollution and degradation. Hon. Terseer Ugbor chaired the Legislative Summit on Students Loans in Nigeria and proposed extensive amendments to the Students Loans Act passed by the 9th House of Representatives and passed into law by President Bola Ahmed Tinubu.

== Early life and educational background ==
Hon Terseer Ugbor was born in Lagos Nigeria, on 20 May 1981 to Air Commodore Stephen Ugbor (Rtd.) and Barrister (Mrs) Cecilia Ugbor, a lawyer and banker. He hails from Kwande Local Government of Benue State and is the first of 6 siblings. He attended Airforce Primary School Ikeja Lagos, Airforce Military School Jos plateau State, and The University of Abuja where he studied Sociology and obtained a Bachelor's Degree in 2004. Hon Terseer Ugbor proceeded for his Post graduate Diploma in management in the Benue State University.

== Political career ==
Hon Terseer Ugbor started his political career under the platform of the APC and clinched the ticket of Kwande/Ushongo Federal Constituency winning with a large margin at the polls getting a position in the National assembly delegation from Benue. he will be representing this federal constituency till 2027.

== Work experience ==
Before public service, Terseer Ugbor was a Value-for-Money Administrator, National Standards Expert for solar PV modules, batteries and charge controllers, expert in battery and e-waste recycling and a sustainability consultant with 17 years of practical working experience. He has specific interests in Sustainable Development and Circular Economy. Terseer Ugbor was the Executive Secretary/CEO of the Alliance for Responsible Battery Recycling (ARBR), the approved Producer Responsibility Organisation for the battery sector in Nigeria. He is the founder/CEO of the Recycling and Economic Development Initiative of Nigeria (REDIN) and also the REDIN Global Industries.

Over the past 10 years, Terseer has quickly become an authority in environmental sustainability strategy and planning, Extended Producer Responsibility (EPR) programmes and waste recycling policies for regulators and private organisations in Nigeria. He publishes the Living Environment Magazine, a niche publication promoting all things environmental sustainability, ecosystems, recycling and pollution issues in Africa.

He has presented papers and spoken at over 40 seminars, workshops and conferences in Nigeria, Africa and has designed and participated in over 50 public policy and implementation projects 1 for the Federal Ministry of Environment, National Environmental Standards and Regulations Enforcement Agency (NESREA), Standards Organisation of Nigeria (SON), National Automotive Design and Development Council (NADDC), Rural Electrification Agency (REA), German Development Agency (GIZ), the Heinrich Boll Stiftung (HBS), the Basel Convention Coordinating Centre for Africa (BCCC-Africa) and the Renewable Energy Association of Nigeria (REAN), among others.

== In the news ==
- Terseer Ugbor wins Kwande/Ushongo
- Reps Member Terseer Ugbor seeks upgrade of climate change
- How nigeria will benefit from Loss and Damage fund - Terseer Ugbor
