= Edumoga =

- District and Township
- Location within Nigeria
- Coordinates: 06°59′25″N 07°52′14″E
- Country: Nigeria
- State: Benue State
- LGA: Okpokwu
- District: Edumoga
- Established: 1923

Government
  - Type: Chieftaincy
  - Chief: Sunday Abah
- Time zone: UTC+01:00 (WAT)
- Postal code: 973106
- ISO 3166 code: NG-BN
- Climate: Aw

Edumoga is a district and township located in Zone C of Benue State, within the Okpokwu Local Government Area in the Middle Belt region of Nigeria. It is located at 06°59′25″N 07°52′14″E and identified with the postal code, 973106

== Location and Geography ==
The district is situated in the heart of the Idoma-speaking region and boasts a strong agricultural economy. It is situated about 140 kilometres from Makurdi, the state capital. Edumoga is bounded by Ochobo, Otukpa, Okpoga, and Olamaboro communities.

== History ==
Between the years 1600 and 1671, during the Kwararafa war, the people of Edumoga migrated from Gwamaja in Kano State and later settled in Apa (Wukari) where they became part of the Kwararafa confederation. Iduh, who migrated southward and settled on the present Idoma land is the forefather of the Idoma people. He begot Ede who begot a son, Oga and hence, the name "Edumoga" (meaning Ede begot Oga), derived from Edeh, the forefather and founder of the settlement, and his son Oga. Family settlements were later established within the locality by the sons of Oga.

In 1923, Edumoga Chiefdom was established with Chief Ikwumonu Okpotu as the first Ede(h). Until this day, the Ede stool is rotated among the ruling clans, with the current Ede being Chief Sunday Abah from the Eke ruling line.

== Migration ==
Edumoga and his brothers, Ode(y) (Iyala'achi) and others, settled briefly at Abinsi near Makurdi. Ode(y) then later moved to form the Iyalla, Ogoja, Bekwara, and Obanliko communities in Cross River State. The other brothers formed the Alago, Keana, and Doma communities in Nasarawa State.

== Settlement and disputes ==
Edumoga settled in Idah but left due to mistreatment by the Igala people. He then settled in Eguma (Ankpa) and later moved to Ikobi (Ikobi Anugba) before finally settling in Okokolo in Otukpo Town.

Edumoga has six clans, with the Ekeh clan being the most senior. The traditional council hierarchy remains in place, handling cultural and traditional matters. The 2nd and 3rd class chiefs created by the government serve as government messengers.

=== Settlements ===
Some major settlements in Edumoga district include:

- Agamud
- Agbangwe
- Aiede
- Akpodo
- Amafu
- Aokpe
- Efffa
- Effion
- Efoyo
- Ejema
- Ekenobi
- Engle
- Igama
- Ijeha
- Ipoya
- Iwewe
- Laionyes
- Obotu-Ehaje
- Obotu-Icho
- Ogblega
- Ogene
- Ogodum
- Ojigo
- Okopolikpo-Icho
- Okpale
- Okpilioho
- Okpolikpo-Ehaje
- Oladegbo
- Olago
- Olaidu
- Olaioleje
- Olanyega
- Ojapo
- Amoda
- Ollo
- Omolokpo
- Omusu
- Otobi
- Ugbokolo

== Cultural Significance ==
=== Cultural heritage ===
Edumoga's culture is deeply rooted in Idoma traditions, reflected in its festivals and ceremonies, such as Ejalekwu, Achomuduje (New Yam Festival) and Oglinya dance. The people value their traditions and customs, including oral tradition, dance, and social relationships. They also value truthfulness, generosity, and frankness.

=== Cultural festival ===
The Edumoga Annual Cultural Festival is being held to celebrate the centenary of Edumoga Chiefdom. The district celebrates the New Yam Festival (Achomuduje), which marks the beginning of the yam harvest season. These festivals provide a platform for brainstorming on their culture, tradition, and general ways of life.

=== Traditional Administration ===
The traditional administration of these people is rooted in age-old customs and established practices. Edumoga is a chiefdom governed by a traditional ruler, Och'Edumoga, and the headquarters of the chiefdom is Olanyega. Each village has an "Ijachi" as the village head.

== Economic Activity ==
The major occupation of the Edumoga people is farming, with a focus on subsistent farming. Cassava is the major economic crop, and garri, akpu, and alebo are made from it. Edumoga has two markets, Afor and Ekeh, which are held once every five days.

=== Agricultural economy ===
Edumoga's agricultural wealth significantly contributes to Benue State's GDP. The district is a major producer of crops like cassava, yams, maize, and rice, leveraging its fertile soil and vast arable land.

== Challenges and development ==
Despite its potential, Edumoga faces significant challenges, including poor infrastructure and inadequate government support. The district's road network is in disrepair, hindering economic activities and access to social amenities. The new Benue State Chieftaincy law has introduced conflict and division among the people. The rotational system of ascension to the Ede throne has been challenged, leading to disputes and litigation.

== Demographics ==
Edumoga is one of the largest districts in Zone C, Benue State, both in land size and population. The Edumoga people are part of the Idoma nation, with their own distinct dialect and cultural practices. They are predominantly farmers, traders, and artisans. The Edumoga dialect is closely related to the Idoma language, with some distinct features. They are made up of six clans as mentioned

- Ekeh
- Onah (Onakpata)
- Adatanwata (Ai'Abbah Ehicho)
- Akpo'odo
- Ugbokolo
- Ingle

== Notable people ==
Edumoga has produced notable sons and daughters, including:

- Comrade Abba Moro (former), Federal Minister of Interior of Nigeria
- David Adulugba ESQ. Chairman / Team Leader (former) Executive Director/CEO of the Nigerian Export Promotion Council
- Ameh Ebute (former), President of the Senate of Nigeria
- Hon. Simon Ofikwu (former), member of the Benue State House of Assembly
- Michael Umale Adikwu (former), Vice Chancellor of the University of Abuja
- Innocent Ujah Idibia, singer, songwriter and Philanthropist who is also known as 2Face.

== See also ==
- List of villages in Benue State
