= 2019 Nigerian Senate elections in Benue State =

2019 Nigerian Senate election in Benue State

The 2019 Nigerian Senate election in Benue State was held on February 23, 2019, to elect members of the Nigerian Senate to represent Benue State. Patrick Abba Moro representing Benue South, Gabriel Suswam representing Benue North-East and Emmanuel Yisa Orker-Jev representing Benue North-West all won on the platform of Peoples Democratic Party.

== Overview ==
| Affiliation | Party | | Total |
| Affiliation | PDP | APC | Total |
|---|---|---|---|
| Before Election | 1 | 2 | 3 |
| After Election | 3 | 0 | 3 |

== Summary ==
| District | Incumbent | Party | Elected Senator | Party |
|---|---|---|---|---|
| Benue South | David Mark | PDP | Patrick Abba Moro | PDP |
| Bauchi North-East | Barnabas Gemade | APC | Gabriel Suswam | PDP |
| Bauchi North-West | George Akume | APC | Emmanuel Yisa Orker-Jev | PDP |

== Results ==
=== Benue South ===
A total of 16 candidates registered with the Independent National Electoral Commission to contest in the election. PDP candidate Patrick Abba Moro won the election, defeating APC candidate, Stephen Lawani and 16 other party candidates. Moro scored 85,162 votes, while APC candidate Lawani scored 47,972 votes.

2019 Nigerian Senate election in Benue State
| Party | Candidate | Votes | % |
|---|---|---|---|
| PDP | Patrick Abba Moro | 85,162 | |
| PDP | Stephen Lawani | 47,972 | |
| Others | | | |
| Total votes | | 175,229 | 100% |
| PDP hold | | | |

=== Benue North-East ===
A total of 20 candidates registered with the Independent National Electoral Commission to contest in the election. PDP candidate and former governor Gabriel Suswam won the election, defeating APC candidate Mimi Adzape Orubibi and 18 other party candidates. Suswa pulled 148,615 votes, while APC candidate Orubibi scored 81,603 and SDP candidate which is the incumbent scored 32,534.

2019 Nigerian Senate election in Benue State
| Party | Candidate | Votes | % |
|---|---|---|---|
| PDP | Gabriel Suswam | 148,615 | |
| APC | Mimi Adzape Orubibi | 81,603 | |
| Others | | | |
| Total votes | | 282,747 | 100% |
| PDP hold | | | |

=== Benue North-West ===
A total of 11 candidates registered with the Independent National Electoral Commission to contest in the election. PDP candidate Emmanuel Yisa Orker-Jev won the election, defeating APC candidate and incumbent, George Akume. Orker-Jev pulled 157,726 votes while his closest rival Akume pulled 115,422 votes.

2019 Nigerian Senate election in Benue State
| Party | Candidate | Votes | % |
|---|---|---|---|
| PDP | Emmanuel Yisa Orker-Jev | 157,726 | |
| APC | George Akume | 115,422 | |
| Others | | | |
| Total votes | | 279,007 | 100% |
| PDP hold | | | |
