= Okpale-Otta =

Okpale a community of Edumoga

Okpale-Otta (popularly called "Okpale" for short) is a community in the Edumoga district of Okpokwu Local Government Area of Benue State, Nigeria. There are around 500 inhabitants in the community.

== History ==
The current community of Okpale-Otta has its origin from one of the last three brothers known as Okpale. His name was Adah son Anaga, one of the wives of King Ogbe, the then king who ruled over the small dynasty of Ogege. Adah's father was the son of Abba, the son of Edumoga. He fathered three main children whom together were known as Okpale. The children were: Odo, Ede and Adah who was the last and from another mother called Anaga. Odo and Ede were of the same mother unlike Adah who was an only son of Anaga. For this reason, he was not very much liked by his two brothers; Odo and Ede. One day, they were out fishing and Adah caught a very fish that he alone could not bring out so, he called on his two half-brothers for assistance. Meanwhile, the two brothers had not caught anything all day thus, out of spite they decided to kill him. So, instead of assisting Adah with his big catch, they were pushing him into the deep side of the river so that he could drown. However, a maternal relative of Adah called Ogwuche who was hunting very close by overheard the shouting of dying Adah so, he ran to his rescue. Few weeks later after settling of the quarrel in the household of Ogbe their father, Ogwuche offered to adopt Adah. And with him, he stayed until he became a full grow man. Having come of age, Adah took up wives while he settled in an area known as Ogamgam around a river called Ogbadibo. With his wives, he had eight children in this order: okpe, Ugblu, Okpotu, Adikwu, Akor, Idoko, Enoke and Abukar respectively. In pursuit of greener pastures, Adah migrated his family a place known as Otta (a river that dries) hence, the name Okpale-Otta, there, he resettled with his family. The eight children formed the clans that make up the present Okpale-Otta.

== Religion ==
The community's original religion was paganism which they practiced until the arrival of the Roman Catholic missionaries in the early fifties. Despite the introduction of Christianity, the practice of paganism only faded away in the late nineties thereby leaving Christianity, specifically the Catholic Church in the community. But of recent, other churches like New Creation Assembly and The Living Faith Church are now in existence in the community.

== Festival ==
The Okpale-Otta people have an annual festival called Echi’ene, meaning on the fourth. It is so called, because the community having been able to produce someone in person of Chief Peter Idoko as the district head of Edumoga in the Local Government Area of the Benue State.

== Economic activities ==
In the community, subsistent farming is the main source of income of the inhabitants. Although, a few people have small businesses that they manage to supplement their income.

== Government ==
The community practices a system of democracy where various elders and adult comes from each of the eight clans to deliberate upon issues affecting the community. However, this system is now segmented as a result of the dispersed of major indigenes outside the community and it is now been practiced in the various cities of Nigeria under the general name of Okpale-Otta National Meeting with its center in the community. A body known as the Okpale-Otta Descendants Association (ODA) is subset of the body which may be referred to as the governing council of the Okpale-Otta National Meeting. This body meets annually to discuss affairs of the community as to how to improve the community in general.

== Law and order ==
Before the advent of Christianity in the Okpale-Otta community, the agent of maintaining and enforcing law and order was the traditional Night Masquerade known as Onyonkpo. The Onyonkpo's primary responsibilities were settling of arguments between villagers, sanctioning criminals and arbitrating among embittered relationships. However, the practice of the Onyonkpo system of maintaining law and order in the community was ended in 2011 due to selfish administration of justice, lack of checks and balances on the Onyonkpo, loss of confidence of the people on the Onyonkpo and shift of allegiance from paganism to Christianity. However, another agent of maintaining law and order in the community known as the “Okpale-Otta Youth Development Association” has been instituted in replacement of the Onyonkpo. In addition to maintaining law and order in the community, they also carry out a sanitization exercise during the rainy season.

== Education ==
The community holds the records of having the first primary school in the entire district of Edumoga of Okpokwu Local Government Area. The school is famous for producing major elites in the whole of the Okpkokwu in terms of basic education. Also present in the community is a secondary school known as Our Lady of Perpetual help College which is to a high degree overseen by the arch dioceses of Otukpo of the Roman Catholic church. Recently, two nursery school are also running in the community. (J.o)

== See also ==
List of villages in Benue State
