= Dorathy Mato =

Nigerian politician (born 1968)

Member Federal House of Representatives
- Incumbent
- Assumed office October 2017
- Preceded by: Herman Hembe
- Constituency: Vandeikiya/Konshisha Federal Constituency of Benue State

Personal details
- Born: Dorathy Kpentomun Mato; 11 September 1968 (age 57) Konshisha, Benue
- Occupation: Politician, business woman

Dorathy Kpentomun Mato (born 16 September 1968) is a Nigerian politician and the current member representing Vandeikiya/Konshisha Federal Constituency of Benue State at the National Assembly (NASS) from October 2017. Mato replaced Mr. Herman Hembe, who was the former chairman, House Committee on Federal Capital Territory following his sack by the Supreme Court judgement annulling his election on 23 June 2017.

== Early life ==
Born 16 September 1968 as Dorathy Kpentomun Mato Kindred, Mbaduku in Vandeikya local government area of Benue State. Dorathy Mato hails from Mbatyough village from the family of Kpentomun Mato a farmer in Mbaduku in Vandeikya Local Government Area of Benue state.

== Education and career ==
Although Mato was brought up in a poor farming family because her parents were subsistence farmers but still they understood the value of education and they enrolled her at R.C.M. Primary School for her early childhood education, from there she obtained her First School Leaving Certificate in 1979.

== Politics ==
After series of appeals contesting the credibility of Hembe's election against her, on 23 June 2017 Dorathy Mato was declared the authentic representative of Vandeikiya/Konshisha federal constituency of Benue State by the Supreme Court and annulled the election of Herman Hembe, a former chairman, House Committee on Federal Capital Territory who was given the mandate and said to have won the election during the 2015 Nigeria general elections under the Peoples Democratic Party (PDP), the judgement that saw Mato as the rightly elected candidate to represent her constituents at the Federal House of Assembly.

The Speaker of House of Representatives Yakubu Dogara refused to swear-in Dorathy Mato as a replacement for Mr. Herman Hembe on a reason undisclosed by the reps but however, on 3 October 2017 the house speaker finally sworn in Mato into office.

== Personal life ==
Dorothy Mato is married to Ahura Mato. They have 3 kids.
