= Idoma Carnival =

Annual festival in Otukpo, Nigeria

Idoma International Carnival
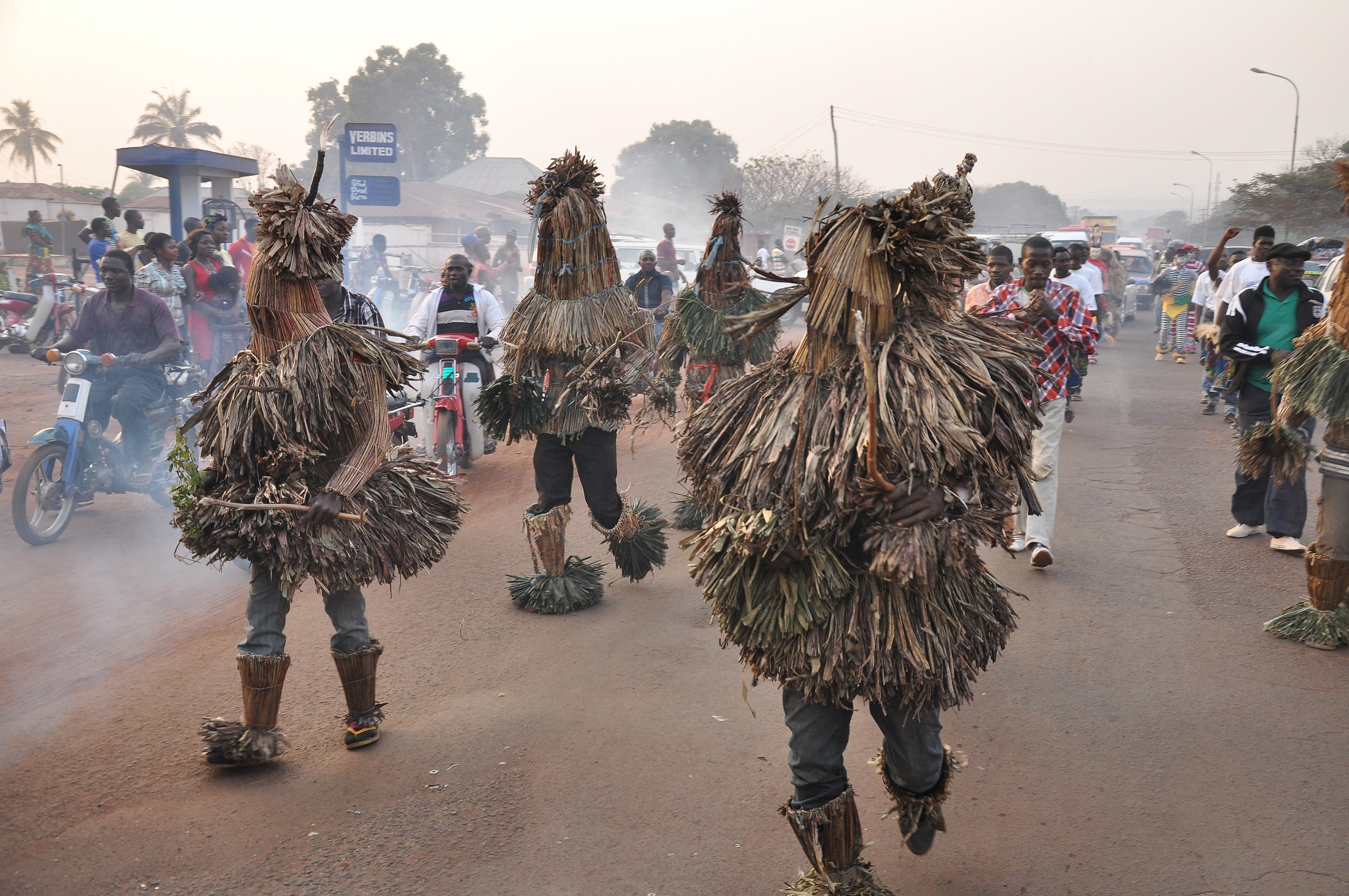
- Status: Active
- Genre: Festivals
- Date: December
- Begins: 2013
- Frequency: Annually
- Location: Benue State
- Country: Nigeria
- Participants: Idoma people

Idoma International Carnival is an annual event held in Otukpo in Benue State, Nigeria.

== History ==
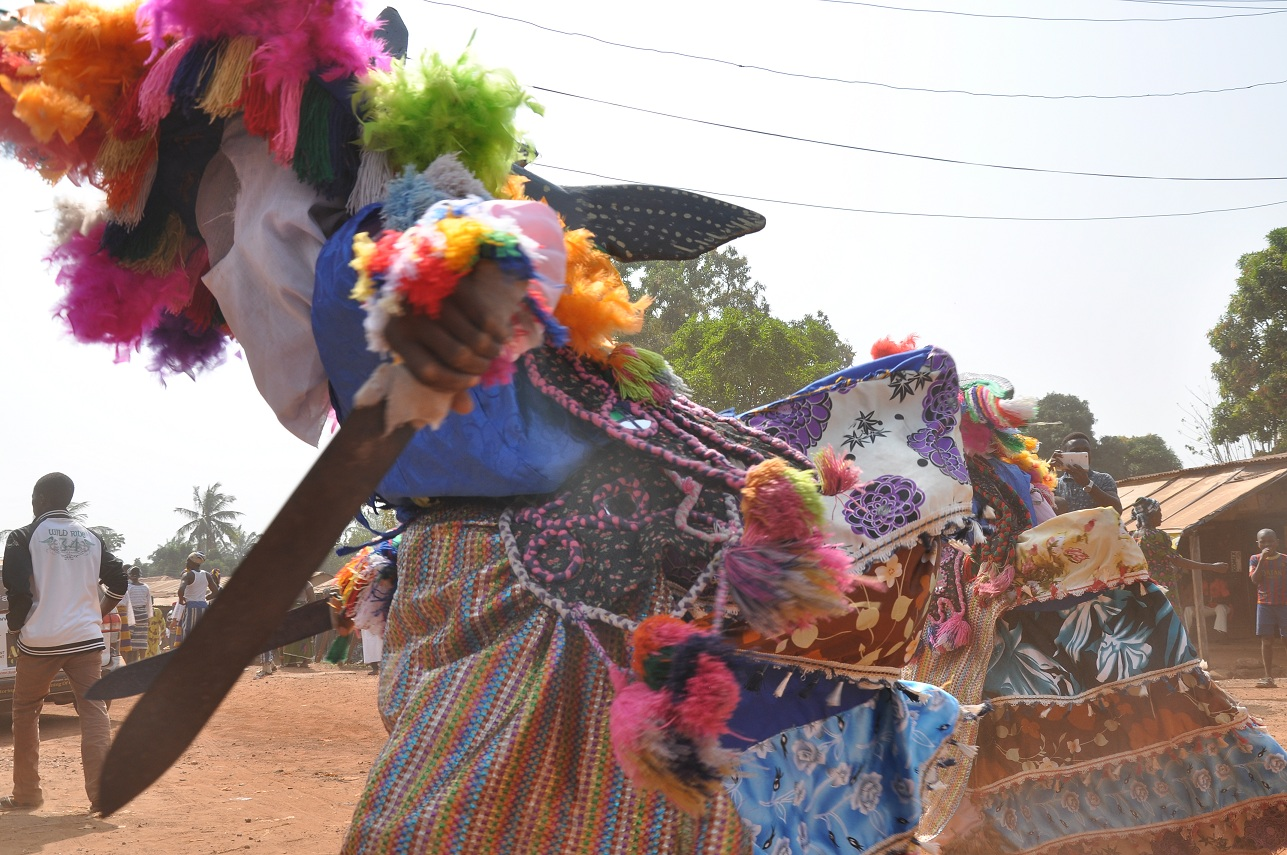
Parade at the 2014 Agila Carnival.

In 2013, Prince Edwin Ochai created the Agila Social & Economic Carnival, with the aim of showcasing to the world the rich social, cultural and Economic endowment of the Idoma Nation through art, craft and social exhibitions.

== The Carnival events ==
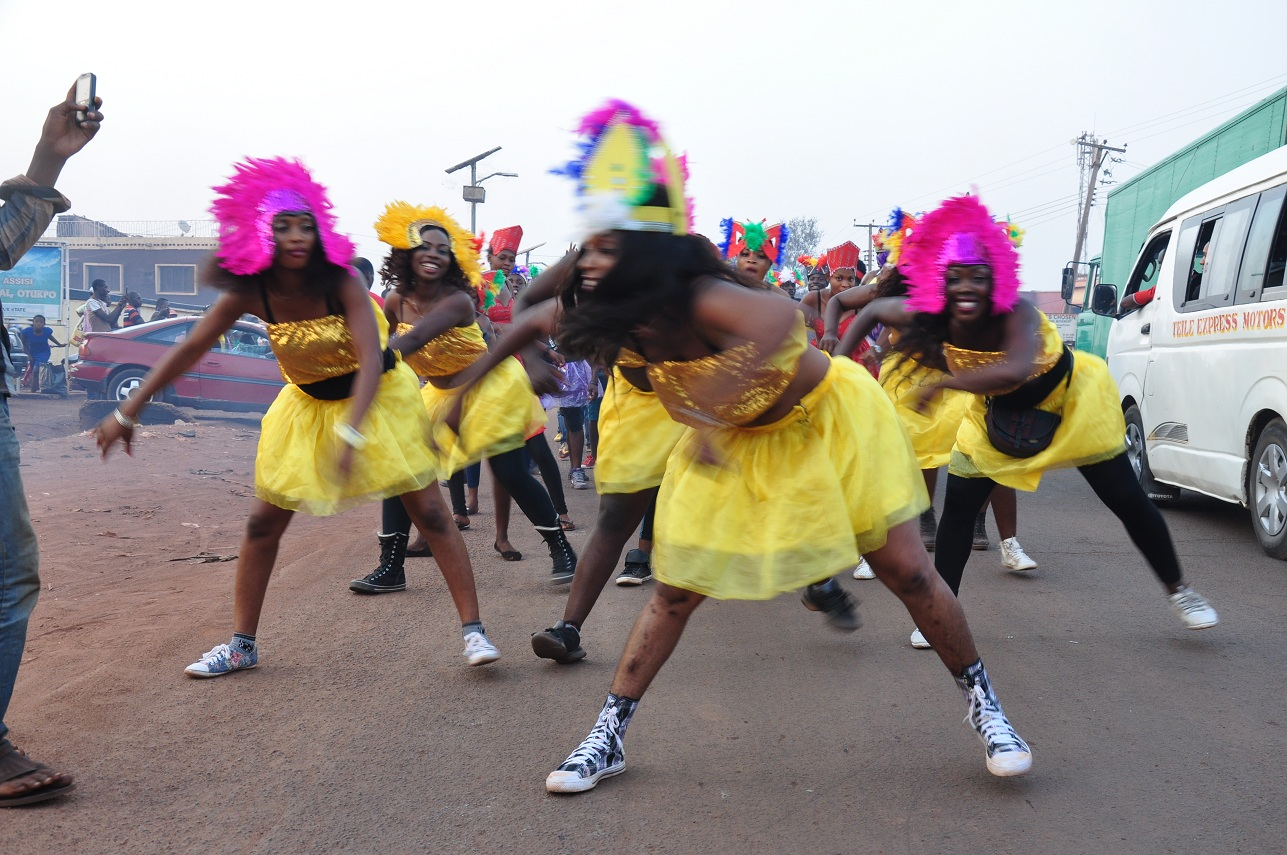
Parade at the 2014 Agila Carnival.

The parades and other events happen during the three official days of carnival. The carnival kicks off in the morning on December 23 and stretches to the afternoon of the same day with procession/Parade in Otukpo followed by migration from Otukpo to Apa between the afternoon and evening of the first day. Later in the evening of the same day is another segment known as burn fire and performances by music artists.

The carnival continues on December 24 with carnival displays in the morning followed by a masquerade display and distribution of gifts to widows. Later in the evening on the same day is the performance by HERO's ambassadors (music & comedy).

The morning of December 25, which is the last day of the carnival, is the migration of people from Apa to Otukpo, preceded by the Face of Idoma beauty pageant.

In preparation towards the Idoma International Carnival(IIC) 2018 edition, the founder of IIC and the organizer announced that the carnival will feature 2Face Idiebia popularly known as 2baba as he will be entertaining thousands of people in attendant. Prince Edward Ochai further stated that the year edition will show beauty, hospitality and rich cultural heritage of the Idoma people.

The IIC which should have hold for the 2020 edition was tuned down as a result of the world wide pandemic outbreak called Corona Virus (COVID-19), therefore, in order to express the kind gesture and level of hospitality towards the people by the founder and organisers, the carnival was made to meet certain demands of the people of Idoma who are in need of support in various means, the IIC became a Palliative giving one as it distribute different food and fruits with other packages such as rice, groundnut oil, yam, noodles, hand sanitizers, face masks and cash to meet the need of people. The 2020 IIC was given the theme Ohigbu Acholalo which means For The Sake Of Our People. Prince Ochia made it known in one of his interviews that it will be insensitive for the Carnival for hold and put peoples life at risk and violate the government restriction order. He also revealed that the palliatives were given to the Christians, Muslims, carnival functional groups and participants of the carnival.

In one of the press interviews with the founder of Idoma International Carnival, he made it clear that though the pandemic prevented the celebration of the Carnival in 2020, but in 2021 the carnival will fully hold and the fun and joy of these event will be restored as the theme is OtuOkpoche K’acholalo meaning Hope for our people and will hold from the 23-26 December.
