= Itogo-Ekingo =

Itogo-Ekingo is a town in Obi LGA of Benue State, Nigeria. The natives are mainly involved in localised farming.
