= Ottah Francis Agbo =

Nigerian politician

Ottah Francis Agbo is a Nigerian politician. He was a member of the Federal House of Representative, representing Ado/Ogbadibo/Okpokwu Federal Constituency of Benue State in the 9th National assembly.
