= Ochepo Adamu =

Nigerian politician

Ochepo Adamu Entonu is a Nigerian politician. He served as a member representing Apa/Agatu Federal Constituency in the House of Representatives. Born on 9 January 1965, he hails from Benue State. He was first elected into the House of Assembly at the 2015 elections. He was re-elected in 2019 for a second term under the Peoples Democratic Party (PDP).
