= Awulu Adaji =

Nigerian politician

Awulu Ezekiel Adaji

Member of the House of Representatives
- In office 2011–2019
- Constituency: Otukpo/Ohimini Federal Constituency

Personal details
- Born: 1 June 1963 (age 62) Benue State, Nigeria
- Party: Peoples Democratic Party (PDP)
- Occupation: Politician

Awulu Ezekiel Adaji is a Nigerian politician who served as a member representing the Otukpo/Ohimini Federal Constituency in the House of Representatives. Born on 1 June 1963, he hails from Benue State. He was first elected into the House of Representatives in 2011 and was re-elected in 2015 for a second term under the Peoples Democratic Party (PDP).
