= Godday Odagboyi Samuel =

Nigerian politician

Godday Odagboyi Samuel is a Nigerian politician. He was a member of the Federal House of representatives representing Apa/Agatu Federal Constituency of Benue state in the 9th National Assembly.
