= Apa, Benue State =

Apa
- LGA
- Interactive map of Apa
- Coordinates: 7°48′N 8°06′E
- Country: Nigeria
- State: Benue State
- Local Government Headquarters: Ugbokpo

Government
  - Local Government Chairman and the Head of the Local Government Council: Danjuma Solomon

Population (2022)
  - Total: 175,000
- NBS
- Time zone: UTC+1 (WAT)
- Postal Code: 972107
- Religion: Christian 96%, Traditionalists, 2.4% Islam 1.6%

Apa is a local government area in Benue State, Nigeria. It was first created on 23 March 1981. It became defunct on 31 December 1983, and was later re-created in August, 1991. The local government is located in the northwestern part of Makurdi, the capital of Benue State. It is bounded to the North by Agatu local government, to the East by Gwer West, to the South by Otukpo and to West by Omala local government area of Kogi State.

It has population of about 175,000 people with a population density of about 339 persons per km^{2}. The inhabitants of the local government are predominantly Idoma and a few Igalas and other settlers.

The local government has 11 council wards namely, Ugbokpo, Edikwu I, Ikobi, Ojantelle/Akpete, Oba, Iga, Oiji, Ojope, Igoro, Edikwu II and Auke.

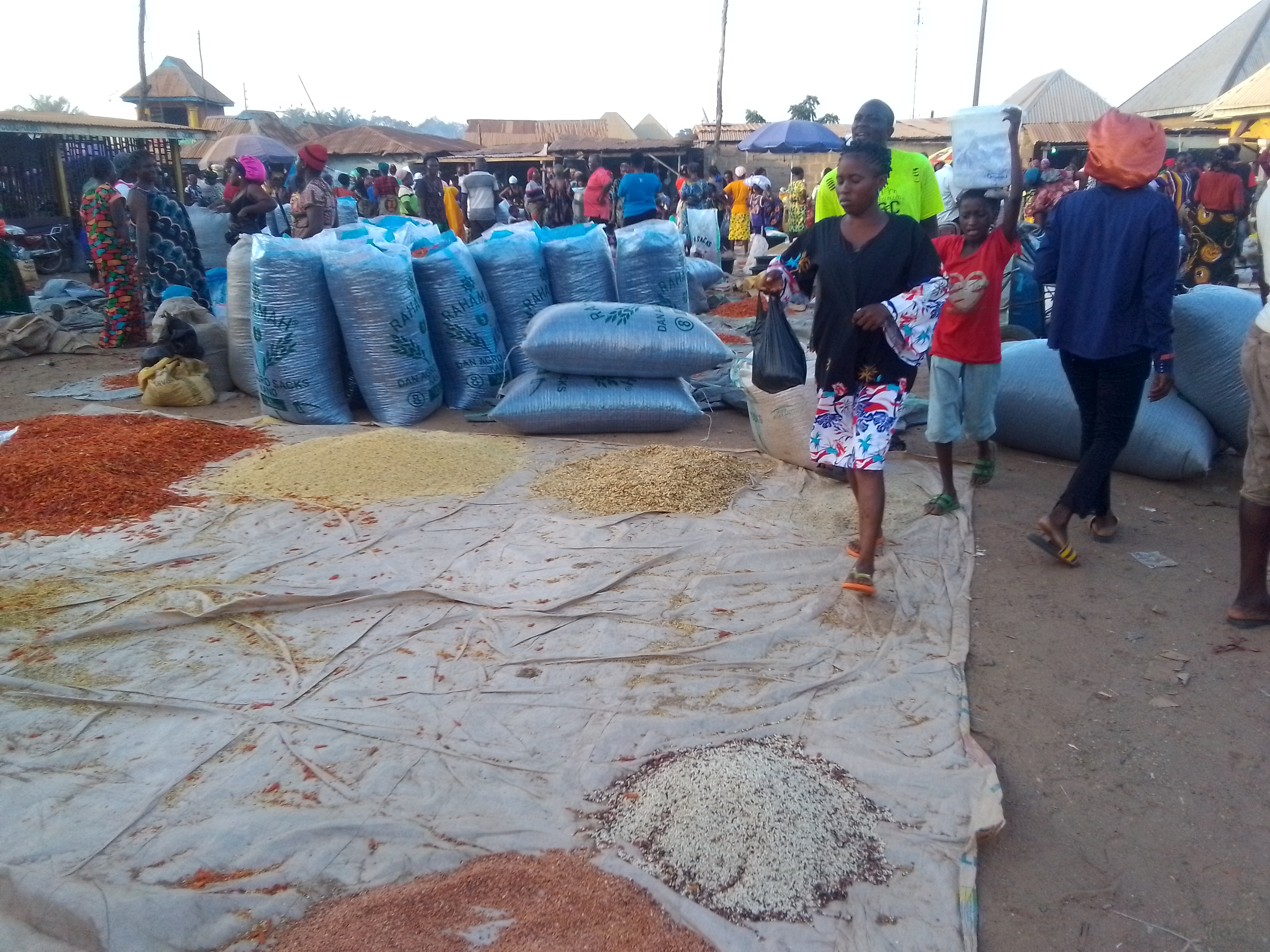
Pepper section of Ugbokpo Agriculture Market

== History ==
The origins of Apa stands before the colonial era, as the area historically formed part of the ancient Idoma territories that spanned the middle Benue Valley.

== Culture and festivals ==
The Eje-Alekwu festival is among the region’s most widely observed ritual festivals; it includes masquerades, dances and rites tied to harvest and ancestral observance.

== Governance and traditional leadership ==
Apa is a Local Government Area of Benue State.

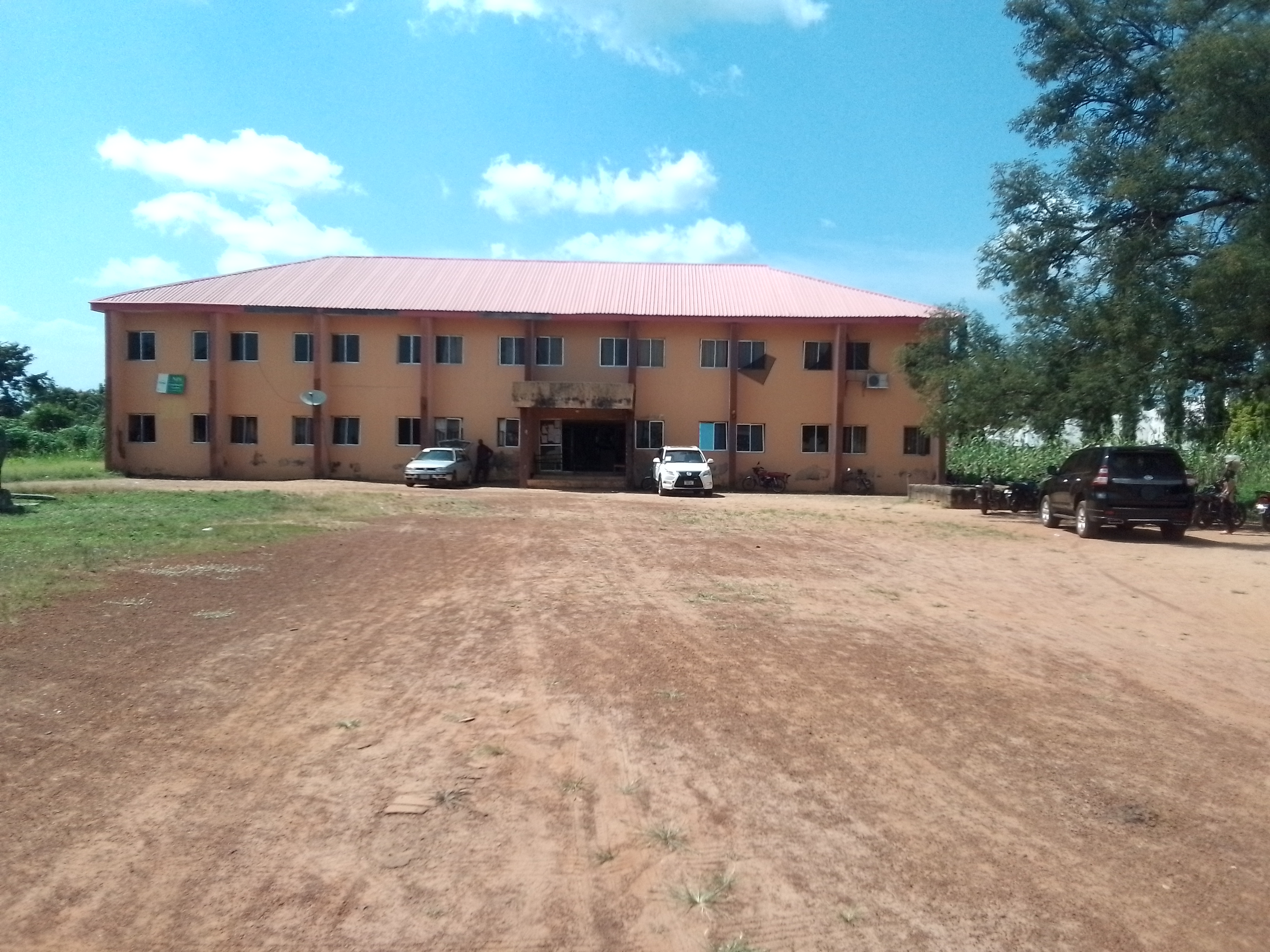
Apa Local Government Area administrative building in Ugbokpo.

== Administrative wards ==
The LGA is subdivided into eleven electoral wards as recognised by the Independent National Electoral Commission (INEC). The wards are, Akpete/Ojantelle, Auke, Edikwu I, Edikwu II, Iga-Okpaya, Igoro, Ikobi, Oba, Ofoke, Oiji, and Ugbokpo. The Apa Local Government Area (LGA) of Benue State, Nigeria, comprises numerous towns and villages.

== Notable people ==
- Ojema Ojotu — Member of the House of Representatives for the Apa/Agatu Federal Constituency in the 10th National Assembly.
- Godday Odagboyi Samuel — Member of the House of Representatives for the Apa/Agatu Federal Constituency in the 9th National Assembly (elected 2019).

== Economy ==
Crops grown in the area include yams, cassava, maize, guinea corn and melons.

== See also ==
- List of villages in Benue State
- Benue State
- Nigeria
- West Africa
- Africa
