= Daniel Onjeh =

Nigerian politician

Daniel Onjeh is a Nigerian politician, activist, the former president of the West African Students' Union and the National Association of Nigerian Students and a former Chairman, Governing Board of Project Development Institute (PRODA).

== Background and education ==
Onjeh was born on December 13, 1973, and is a native of Orokam, Ogbadibo the Local Government Area of Benue State.

He was Elected the President of the National Association of Nigerian students in 2002, and subsequently the President of West African Students' Union in 2006.

He holds a bachelor's degree in political science and economics from the prestigious University of Ghana, Legon.

== Political career ==
Daniel Onjeh's passion for his people motivated him to contest election in 2015 to the Senate to represent the people of Benue South Senatorial District under the platform of All Progressives Congress which he lost to the then Senate President Senator David Mark in a keenly contested election.

In 2017, he was appointed the Board Chairman of Project Development Institute (PRODA) by the President Muhammadu Buhari.

In 2023, he also contested election to the Senate to represent the people of Benue South Senatorial District under the platform of All Progressives Congress which he lost to Sen. Abba Moro

.

in a keenly contested election.

== Personal life ==
He is married and has children.

== Awards and honours ==
Daniel Onjeh has several awards including

- Ogbenjuwa KI'doma (2002)
- Most Outstanding Youth Leader's Awards (2003)
- Defender of Democracy Award (2006)
- Icon of Benue Youths (2008)
