= Blessing Onuh =

Nigerian politician (born 1976)

Member of the House of Representatives of Nigeria
- Incumbent
- Assumed office 2019
- Constituency: Otukpo/Ohimini Federal Constituency

Personal details
- Born: 30 June 1976 (age 50)
- Party: APC (since 2020)
- Other political affiliations: APGA (2018–2020); PDP (before 2018)
- Parent: David Mark
- Education: University of Lagos, University of Abuja
- Profession: Politician

Blessing Onyeche Onuh (born 30 June 1976) is a Nigerian politician from Benue State. She represents Otukpo/Ohimini Federal Constituency in the House of Representatives. She is the daughter of former Senate President David Mark.

== Early life and education ==
Blessing Onyeche Onuh was born on the 30th June, 1976 in Otukpo, Benue State to the family of David Mark of Akpegedde-Otukpo. In 1988, she obtained her first school leaving certificate from St. Andrew's Primary School, Otukpo. She then attended Federal Government Girls’ College Gboko and graduated in 1993. In 1995, she got admission to study sociology at the University of Abuja and graduated with a bachelor's degree in 1999. She is currently pursuing her PhD in Gender Studies at the University of Abuja.

== Career ==
After graduation from the university, Blessing Onuh went for the mandatory one year service of the National Youth Service Corps where she served in the Agriculture department of the Central Bank of Nigeria in Jos, Plateau State, from 2000 to 2001. In 2005, she was appointed Special Assistant to the Minister of State for Education. She was later appointed as Special Assistant to the Minister of Inter-Governmental, Local Government and Special Duties. While in this role, she served as Acting Chairman, Federal Capital Territory Committee on the Prerogative of Mercy.

She was then appointed as Secretary for the Social Welfare Secretariat in the Federal Capital Territory Administration. In 2018, she contested for the position of the House of Representatives member for Otukpo/Ohimini federal constituency under the People's Democratic Party in Benue State but lost the primaries to her uncle Johnson Ahubi. She left the party to join the APGA. She then contested the election with APGA and became a member of the House of Representatives representing the Otukpo/Ohimini federal constituency. In February 2021, Onuh defected to the APC, citing a crisis in Benue State APGA leadership.

In June 2023, Onuh was reelected into the 10th House of the Representatives and was made the chair of The House committee on Land Transportation.

== Personal life ==
Blessing married Dr. Innocent Onuh, a medical practitioner from Obotu-Ugboju, Otukpo Local Government Area in 1999. They have three children.
