= Emmanuel Udende =

Senator for Benue North East Senatorial District

Emmanuel Memga Udende is a Nigerian politician, who is the Senator for Benue North East Senatorial District (Zone A) on the ticket of All Progressives Congress, APC. He defeated the incumbent senator and former governor of Benue State, Gabriel Suswam in the February 25, 2023, National Assembly elections.

== Political career ==
Udende was elected to the Federal House of Representatives in 2011 to represent Ukum/Katsina-Ala/Logo Federal Constituency on the ticket of the People's Democratic Party, PDP. He was re-elected to the House in 2015 on the same party ticket but cross-carpeted to the APC in 2016 citing leadership crises in the party. He failed to return to the House in 2019. In 2022, he clinched the nomination of his party to run for Benue North East senatorial seat after polling 211,887 to defeat his major opponent Chief Terlumun Akputu who scored 84,304 in a direct primary election.

In the general election on 25 February 2023, Udende of the APC polled 141,405 to beat the incumbent senator and former governor of Benue State Gabriel Suswam of the PDP who scored 107,303 votes. Suswam rejected the results and said he would challenge it at the Tribunal to reclaim it.

In the proceeding Election Petition tribunal, Udende was initially defeated and he appealed the decision to The Nigerian Court of Appeal who then ruled in his favour citing various errors in the decision of the lower tribunal.

Udende currently seats as the chairman of the Nigerian Senate Committee on Anti Corruption and is the deputy chairman of the Nigerian Senate Committee for Privatization.
