= Benue North-West senatorial district =

Senatorial district in Nigeria

Benue North-West senatorial district is well known as Zone B in Benue State. The senatorial district has seven local governments which include Buruku, Gboko, Tarka, Guma, Makurdi, Gwer and Gwer West. There are 90 electoral wards and 1,286 polling units as of 2019 polls. The current representative of Benue North-West senatorial district is Titus Zam of the All Progressives Congress, APC.

== List of senators representing Benue North-West District ==
Senator	Party	Year	Assembly
Joseph Tarka	NPN	1979–1980	2nd
Iyorchia Ayu	SDP	1992–1993	3rd
Joseph Waku	PDP	1999–2003	4th
Joshua Adagba	PDP	2003–2005	5th (Note: Joshua Adagba died in office on 27 July 2005. Fred Orti completed the remained of Adagba's tenure.)
Fred Orti	PDP	2005–2007	5th
George Akume	PDP ^{(2007–2011)} ACN ^{(2011–2015)} APC ^{(2015–2019)}	2007–2019	6th, 7th, 8th
Emmanuel Orker-Jev	PDP	2019–2023	9th
Titus Zam	All Progressives Congress	2023–present	10th
