= John Dyegh =

Member of the House of Representatives of Nigeria (born 1962)

Member of the House of Representatives of Nigeria
- In office 29 May 2011 – 29 May 2023
- Preceded by: Hon. Terngu, Tsegba
- Succeeded by: Regina Akume

Personal details
- Born: 2 December 1962 (age 63) Mbatyav Gboko, Benue State, Nigeria
- Party: People's Democratic Party (PDP)
- Relations: Married
- Education: Benue State University
- Occupation: Legislature businessman

John Dyegh (born 2 December 1962) is a Nigerian politician, businessman and philanthropist from Gboko, Benue State who served as a member of the 9th Nigeria National Assembly, representing Gboko/Tarka Federal constituency at the House of Representatives of Nigeria. Dyegh previously served as a member of committee on Appropriations, Drugs, Narcotics and Financial Crimes, Education, Gas Resources, Inter-Parliamentary Relations, Science and Technology in the 7th National Assembly. He ran for the second term as a favourite candidate, bearing the flag of the All Progressives Congress and retained his seat, following the announcement of 28 March National Assembly Polls in the 2015 General Elections in which he polled 67,463 votes to defeat his challenger, Bernard Nenger of the Peoples' Democratic Party (PDP) with 26,329 votes. He ran for a third term on the platform of the All Progressives Congress and won. Dyegh successfully served his 3rd term in the National Assembly and was the House committee chairman on Human Rights. He ran for a fourth term under the platform of the Peoples' Democratic Party where he lost to Regina Akume, a candidate of the All Progressives Congress in the 2023 general elections.

== Early life ==
Dyegh was born on 2 December 1962 in Mbatyav, Gboko, Benue State, Nigeria. He received elementary schooling at LGEA Primary School Gboko, earning First School Leaving Certificate before proceeding to Mbawuar Secondary School Ihugh in Vandeikya Local Government Area, for Senior Secondary School Certificate. He then studied at the Benue State University for both undergraduate and post-graduate degrees. John Dyegh obtained a Doctorate at the same institution, making him the first and the only House of Representatives Member to have represented a constituency with the highest educational qualification from Benue State, a record that is yet to be matched.

== Political career ==
Dyegh garnered political prominence when he ran successfully on the platform of the then main opposition party in Nigeria – the Action Congress of Nigeria (ACN) for the House of Representatives seat to represent Gboko/Tarka Federal Constituency. Despite running as an out of favour candidate, he polled overwhelming 85,917 votes to defeat rival, Barr. Tony Ijohor who ran under the umbrella of the ruling Peoples Democratic Party (PDP) but trailed Dyegh by 55,540 votes.

Dyegh enjoys support for his speedy rural electrification initiatives, donating more than ten transformers to various communities and sinking over thirty boreholes as well as building classroom blocks in many primary and post-primary institutions of learning in his constituency within only three years in office. The politician is also credited for his ability in executing constituency projects.

Dyegh has sponsored the Nigerian Electoral Offences Commission Bill, 2011. The bill seeks establishment of an Electoral Offenses Commission but received only its first reading on 7 February 2012.

On 20 March 2017, Dyegh accused the Federal Government of Nigeria for failing to protect human lives ahead of cows and other livestock in the country, claiming that some powerful Nigerians were frustrating the passage of the bill prohibiting open grazing pending before the House. Dyegh said this following wanton killing of the Tiv farmers by the Fulani herdsmen in his own state of Benue, with the Nigerian government failing to end the clashes. He cited the case of a bill sponsored by Senator Barnabas Gemade at the Senate to have suffered the same fate. He advised the government to be decisive in curbing the clashes between the herdsmen and farmers.

== Controversy ==
In July 2016, the Commissioner of Public Complaints Commission in Benue State, Alhaji Abubakar Tsav called for the interrogation of Hon John Dyegh, the then Gboko Local Government chairman, Emmanuel Kwagba and Hon Terhemba Chabo of the Benue State House of Assembly over allegation of the destruction of some property belonging to a widow in Ikyumbur, Mbatiav, Gboko Local Government Area of Benue State. In a petition written by Adam Terkula Raphael, son of the widow, Eunice Adam, alleged that Hon John Dyegh and others aided the destruction of his mother's property which included houses, farm produce, a motorcycle and economic trees valued at ten million naira (N10,000,000). Raphael in his petition to the Public Complaints Commission stated that when Hon Dyegh was informed about the initial destruction of 160 lines of yams and cassava by Lagos, a political thug in Gboko and his gang, instead of coming to their aid, Dyegh mobilised the youths to cause further havoc. "He told the whole community that my mother is a very bad woman and they should go ahead and burn down her house", "He described our house as the only home of Peoples Democratic Party, PDP in his own kingdom, Mbatiav and that while he is from the APC nothing of PDP should exist in his own council ward," the petitioner also stressed that the lawmaker was "erroneously informed that my mother had named her dog after him."
