= Ojema Ojotu =

Nigerian politician

Member of the House of Representatives of Nigeria
- Incumbent
- Assumed office 2023
- Constituency: Apa/Agatu

Personal details
- Occupation: Politician

Ojema Ojotu is a Nigerian politician. He currently serves as the Federal Representative representing Apa/Agatu constituency of Benue state in the 10th National Assembly.
