= Titus Zam =

Nigerian politician

Titus Zam Tartenger (age 53) is a Nigerian politician and senator-elect representing Benue North-West Senatorial District.

He was named the chairman, Senate committee on rules and business of the 10th senate on 8 August 2023.

.

== Early life ==
Dr.Titus Tartenger Thaddeus Zam was born in 1970, he is born to Zam Numa and Mbahunan Zam, in the village of Tse-Atoo, mbakyuran from Gwer west local government area.He attended his elementary school at RCM Achagh, Naka to taraku road, Gwer west local government area, Benue state.Titus obtained his secondary school certificate at comprehensive secondary school, Naka, where he got the privilege and license to university education.
