= Mark Gbillah =

Nigerian politician

Mark Gbillah is a Nigerian politician. He was a membner of the Federal House of Representative, representing Gwer East/Gwer West federal constituency of Benue State 9th National assembly.
