= Agbadi =

- Village
- Location within Nigeria
- Coordinates: 07°48′00″N 08°37′00″E
- Country: Nigeria
- State: Benue
- Local government area: Makurdi
- Time zone: UTC+1 (WAT)

Agbadi is a village in Benue State, eastern Nigeria.

== Geography ==
The village lies 15 km northeast of Makurdi, the state capital, and is 6 km from the northern shore of the Benue River.
