= Igumale =

Coordinates: 06°48′00″N 07°58′00″E

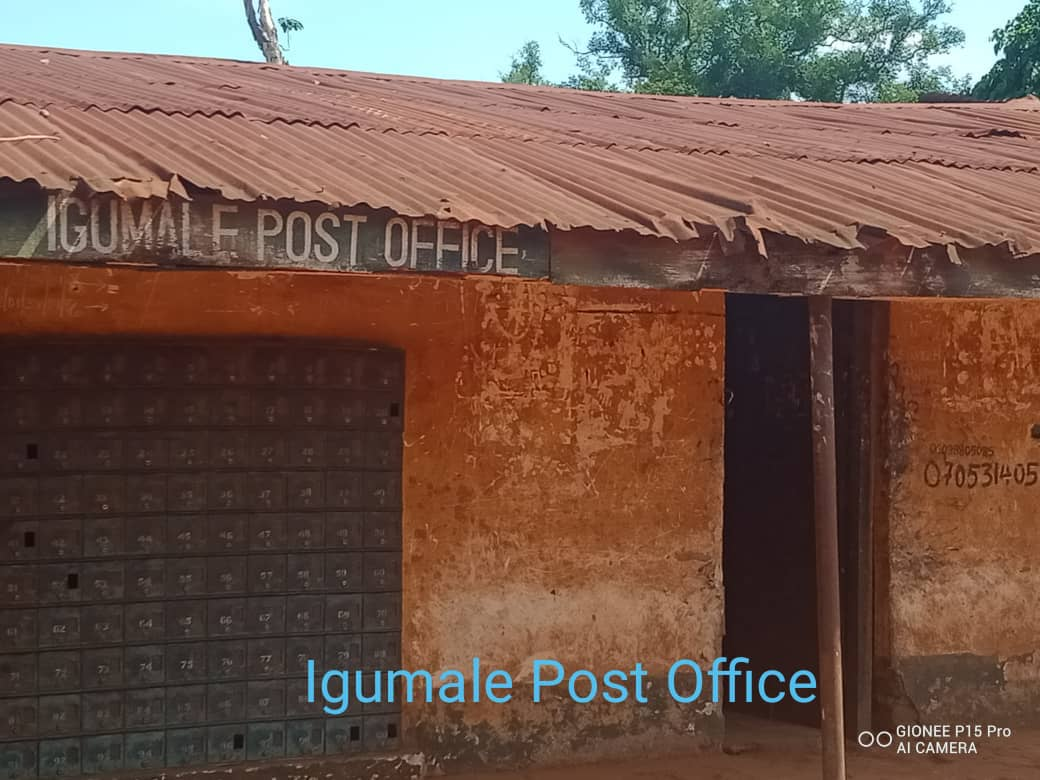
Igumale Post Office, Ado LGA- Benue State

Igumale is a town in Benue State Nigeria.Igumale is located about 120 kilometres (75 mi) distant. About 256 kilometres (159 mi) separates Igumale from Abuja, the nation's capital.

Igumale has a latitude of 6°48'15"N and a longitude of 7°58'22.47"E or 6.804167 and 7.972909 and Population of 8276 according to 2006 census.

== Transport ==
Igumale is served by a station on the eastern mainline of the national railway network.

== Climate ==
In the town of Igumale, the rainy season is warm, oppressive, and overcast and the dry or sunny season is hot, muggy, and partly cloudy. Over the course of the year, the temperature typically varies from 64 °F to 90 °F and is rarely below 57 °F or above 94 °F. Based on the beach/pool score, the best time of the year to visit Igumale for hot-weather activities is from mid of November t mid of February.

Daily highs hover around 84 °F, rarely dropping below 80 °F or rising over 87 °F.

Daily lows average 72 °F, rarely dropping below 70 °F or rising over 74 °F. On October 12, the lowest daily average low temperature is 73 °F.

In Igumale, temperatures normally vary from 71 °F to 90 °F on February 23, the hottest day of the year, and from 64 °F to 86 °F on January 1, the coldest day of the year.

== See also ==
- Railway stations in Nigeria
