= Emmanuel Yisa Orker-Jev =

Nigerian politician and senator

Senator Emmanuel Yisa Orker-Jev

Nigerian Senator
- In office June 2019 – Till date
- Preceded by: George Akume
- Constituency: Benue Northwest

Honourable, Federal House of Representatives
- In office May 2007 – May 2019
- Preceded by: Zakarie Andiir Malherbe
- Succeeded by: Kpam Jimin Sokpo

Personal details
- Born: 15 April 1963 (age 63)
- Party: Peoples Democratic Party (PDP)

Emmanuel Yisa Orker-Jev (born 15 April 1963) is a Nigerian politician and a member of the Peoples Democratic Party (PDP). He defeated former Benue governor, George Akume, in the 2019 senatorial elections for the Benue North-West Senatorial District.

== Background ==
Orker-Jev was born on 15 April 1963 and hails from Buruku Local Government Area of Benue State, Nigeria. He attended NKST Primary School, from 1970 to 1976 and proceeded to Bristow Secondary School to obtain his West African Senior Certificate (WASC). He proceeded to the University of Jos 1985 to study Law, and graduated in 1988 before, he proceeded to the Nigerian Law School and was called to the Nigerian bar in 1989.

== Political career ==
Orker-Jev began his political career in Benue State before elected to the House of Representatives to represent the Buruku Federal Constituency in 2007. He was re-elected for a second term and continued to serve in the National Assembly.

In 2023, he was elected as the senator representing Benue North-West Senatorial District under the platform of the Peoples Democratic Party (PDP). He took over the seat from George Akume, who had represented the district in the Senate since 2007.
