= Tiv people =

West African ethnic group

Tiv
- Flag of the Tiv people

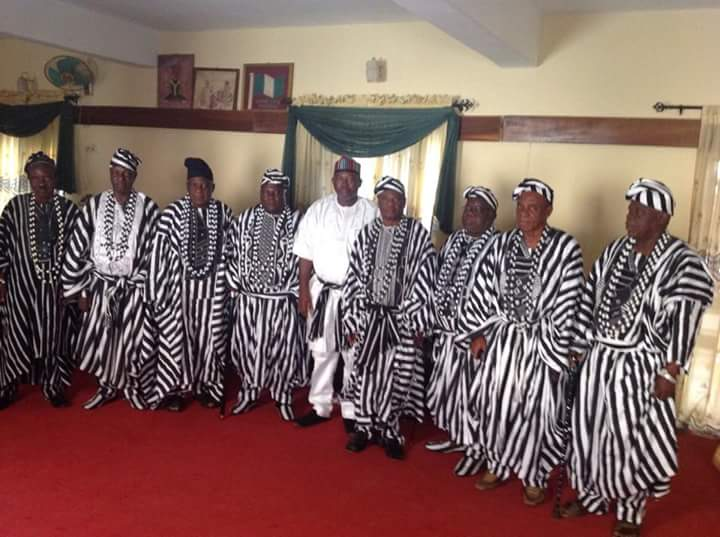

Total population
- Approx. 5 million

Regions with significant populations
- Nigeria, Cameroon

Languages
- Tiv, Tivoid languages, English, French

Religion
- Predominantly Christian, Tiv Traditional religion

Related ethnic groups
- Mambila, Utanga, Bitare, Mesaka, Iceve, Evant, Eman, Ipulo, Caka, Other Tivoid peoples

- Person: Ọr Tiv
- People: Tiv
- Language: Dzwa Tiv
- Country: Tar Tiv

Tiv (or Tiiv) are a Bantu ethnic group. They constitute approximately 2.4% of Nigeria's total population, and number over 5 million individuals throughout Nigeria and Cameroon. The Tiv language is spoken by over 5 million people in Nigeria, with a few speakers in Cameroon. Most of the language's Nigerian speakers are found in Benue, Taraba, Nasarawa, Plateau and Cross River states. The language is a branch of Benue–Congo and ultimately of the Niger–Congo phylum. In pre-colonial times, the Fulani ethnic group referred to the Tiv as "Munchi" (also sometimes written Munshi e.g. Duggan, E. de C. 1932), a term not accepted by the Tiv people.

== History ==
The Tiv believe they moved into their present location from the southeast of Africa. It is claimed that the Tiv left their Bantu kin and wandered through southern, south-central and west-central Africa before returning to the savannah lands of West African Sudan via the River Congo and Cameroon Mountains and settled at Swem, the region adjoining Cameroon and Nigeria at the beginning of 1600C.E., which was originally the Bantu cradle and home. "Coming down," as they put it, was in batches. Some moved southward across Obudu Plateau, others moved downward spreading over Mdema and Waka district which is present day central and Southern Taraba, while others moved into the Benue valley in present-day central Nigeria. These dispersions took place during the early 1600 CE to 1700 CE.

Over time, as social interactions began and new migrants came into Nigeria, they mingled with Fulani at their northern axis to which they foster a relationship calling each other "Jo". Hence Tiv people called Fulani as Fulanijo, Fulani in turn called Tiv, Tivjo. The Fulani also called them Munchi, which the Tiv see as derogatory and unacceptable.

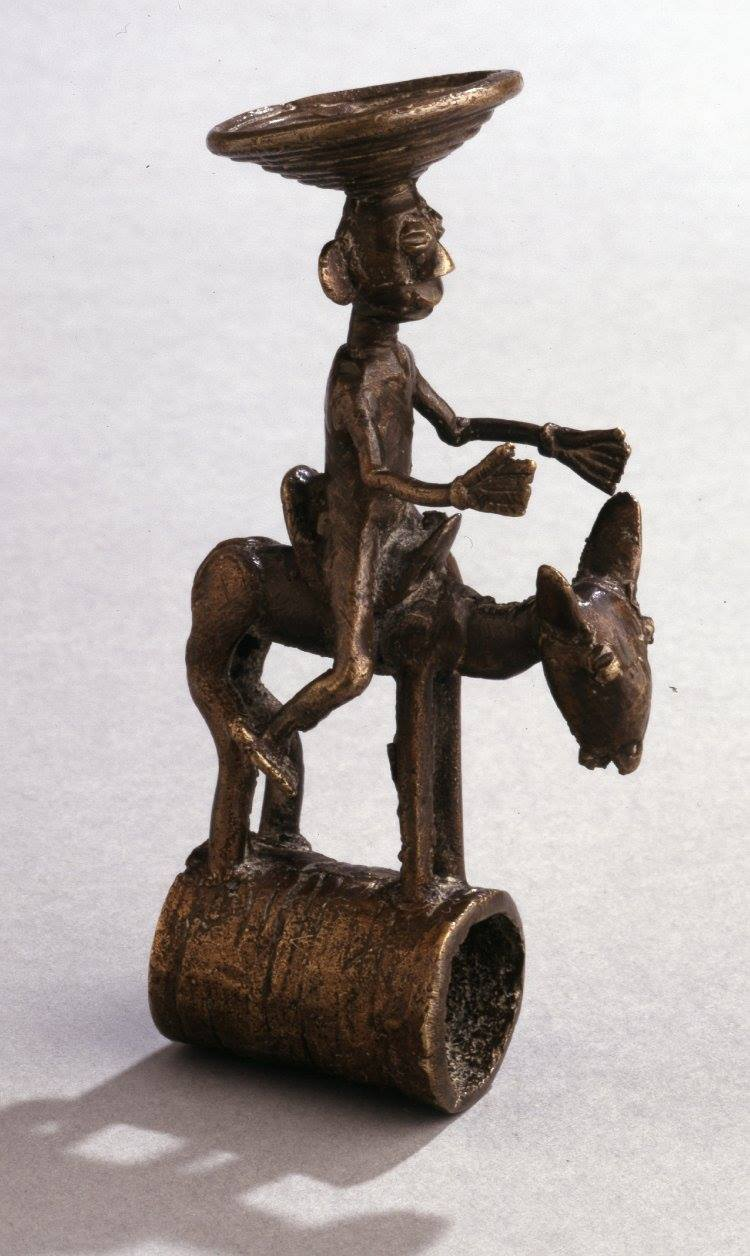
Bronze Tiv snuff-taker, c. 1932 (© The Trustees of the British museum)

The Tiv people were a free people without a king; hence every clan or kindred was administered by the eldest man called "Orya". They were amongst the first inhabitants of the Benue Valley (according to Mark Cartwright's record of Bantu migration) before other tribes finally migrated to join them. Due to their peaceful disposition and dispersed nature of living, with no Central government nor king, they posed no threat to new migrants to the region who cohabited with them until the coming of the Europeans. The Europeans first contact with Tiv was in the 18th century. Note that the time of encounter with the Europeans does not mean their time of migration. Their late recognition was due to the lack of kingship which became a big disadvantage to Tiv in Nigeria because the colonial masters preferred working with kings, which prompted the Tiv to clamor for and install a king( Tor Tiv) in the 1940s.

When the Tiv were found on the banks of the Benue River and were discovered to be distinct from other ethnic minorities, and were the major occupants of the Benue Valley, much curiosity was aroused and immediately the Europeans identified them as the bantus before doing other comprehensive studies on all other aspects of their culture. This was because the Europeans had previously encountered other bantu groups in central and southern Africa.

The British forces entered the Tivlands from the east in 1906, when there was tension between the Tiv and other minorities within the Benue valley. The Tiv approach to battle, fighting techniques, weapons, physique and facial structure weren't any different from those of other Bantu groups they had encountered in Southern and Central Africa. The Tiv said in 1950 that they had defeated this British force, then later invited the British in for negotiations. The southern area was penetrated from the south-south; what the southern Tiv people refer to as "the eruption" of the British that occurred in 1911.

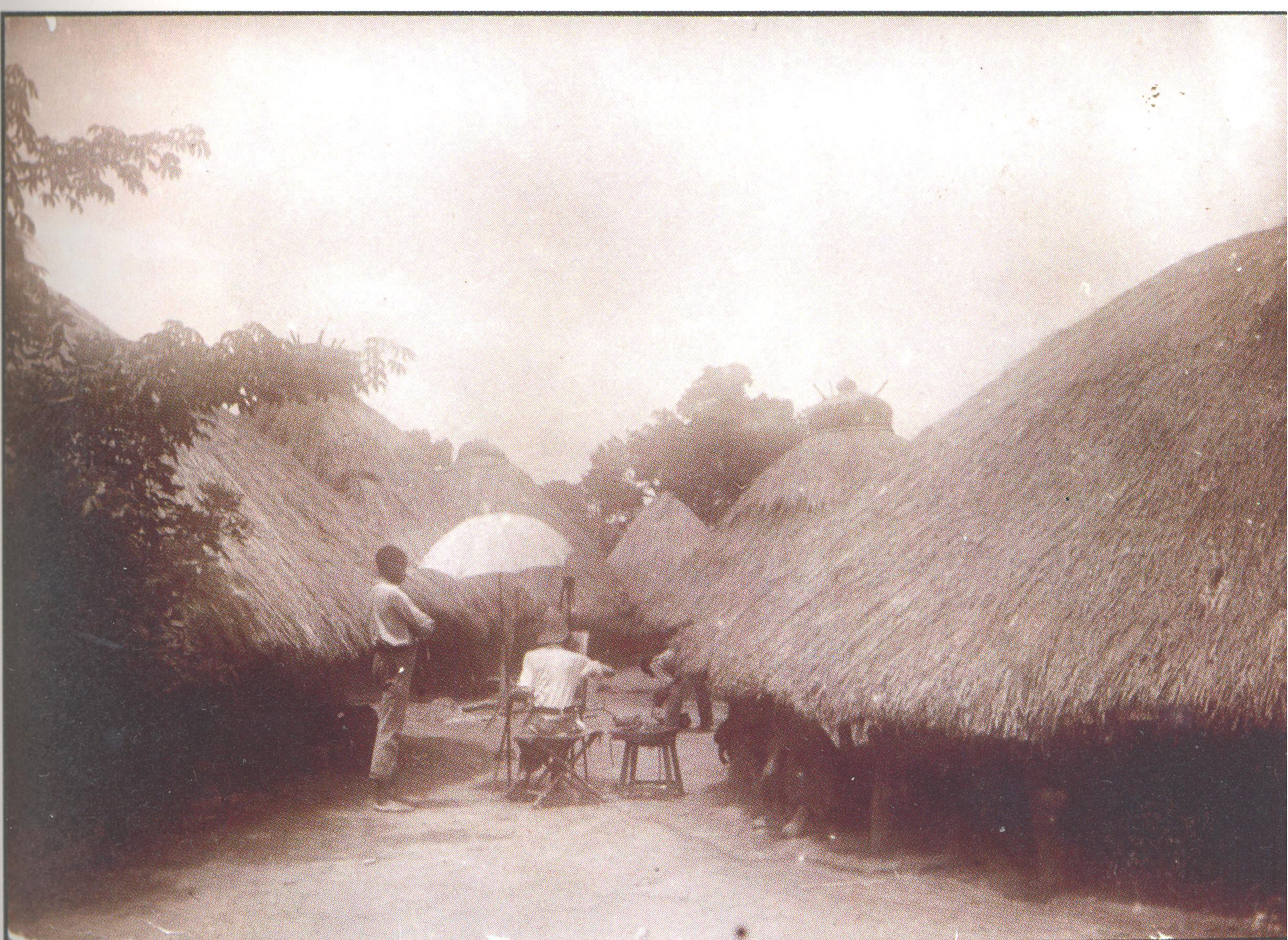
Photo by Leo Frobenius of a Tiv village in August 1911

The Tiv came into contact with European culture during the colonial period. During November 1907 to spring 1908, an expedition of the Southern Nigeria Regiment led by Lieutenant-Colonel Hugh Trenchard came into contact with the Tiv. Trenchard brought gifts for the elders. Subsequently, roads were built and trade links established between Europeans and the Tiv. But before the construction of roads began, a missionary named Mary Slessor went throughout the region seeing to the people's needs.

The Tiv people and their lands were hence the last area in Nigeria of consequence to be brought under the British control.

== Social and political organization ==
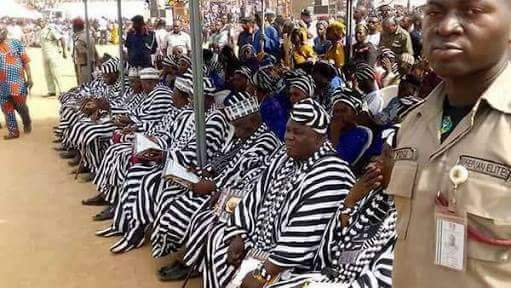
A group of Tiv chiefs at an event

Most Tiv have a highly developed sense of genealogy, with descent being reckoned patrilineally. Ancestry is traced to an ancient individual named Tiv, who had two sons; all Tiv consider themselves a descendant either of Ichongo (translated in English as circumcised) or of Ipusu (translated in English as uncircumcised). Ichongo and Ipusu are each divided into several major branches, which in turn are divided into smaller branches. The smallest branch, or minimal lineage, is the ipaven. Members of an ipaven tend to live together, the local kin-based community being called the "tar". This form of social organisation, called a segmentary lineage, is seen in various parts of the world, but it is particularly well known from African societies (Middleton and Tait 1958). The Tiv are the best-known example in West Africa of a society of segmentary lineage, as documented by Laura Bohannan (1952) and by Paul and Laura Bohannan (1953); in East Africa, the best-known example is the Nuer, documented by E.E. Evans-Pritchard (1940).

The Tiv had no administrative divisions and no chiefs nor councils. Leadership was based on age, influence and affluence. The leaders' functions were to furnish safe conduct, arbitrate disputes within their lineages, sit on moots and lead their people in all external and internal affairs.

These socio-political arrangements caused great frustration to British attempts to incorporate the population into Colonial Nigeria and establish an administration on the lower Benue. The strategy of indirect rule, which the British felt to be highly successful in regards to ruling over the Hausa and Fulani populations in Northern Nigeria, was ineffective in a segmentary society like the Tiv (Dorward David Craig 1969). Colonial officers tried various approaches to administration, such as putting the Tiv under the control of the nearby Jukun, and trying to exert control through the councils of elders ("Jir Tamen"); these met with little success. The colonial administration in 1934 categorised the Tiv into Clans, Kindreds, and Family Groups. The British appointed native heads of these divisions as well.

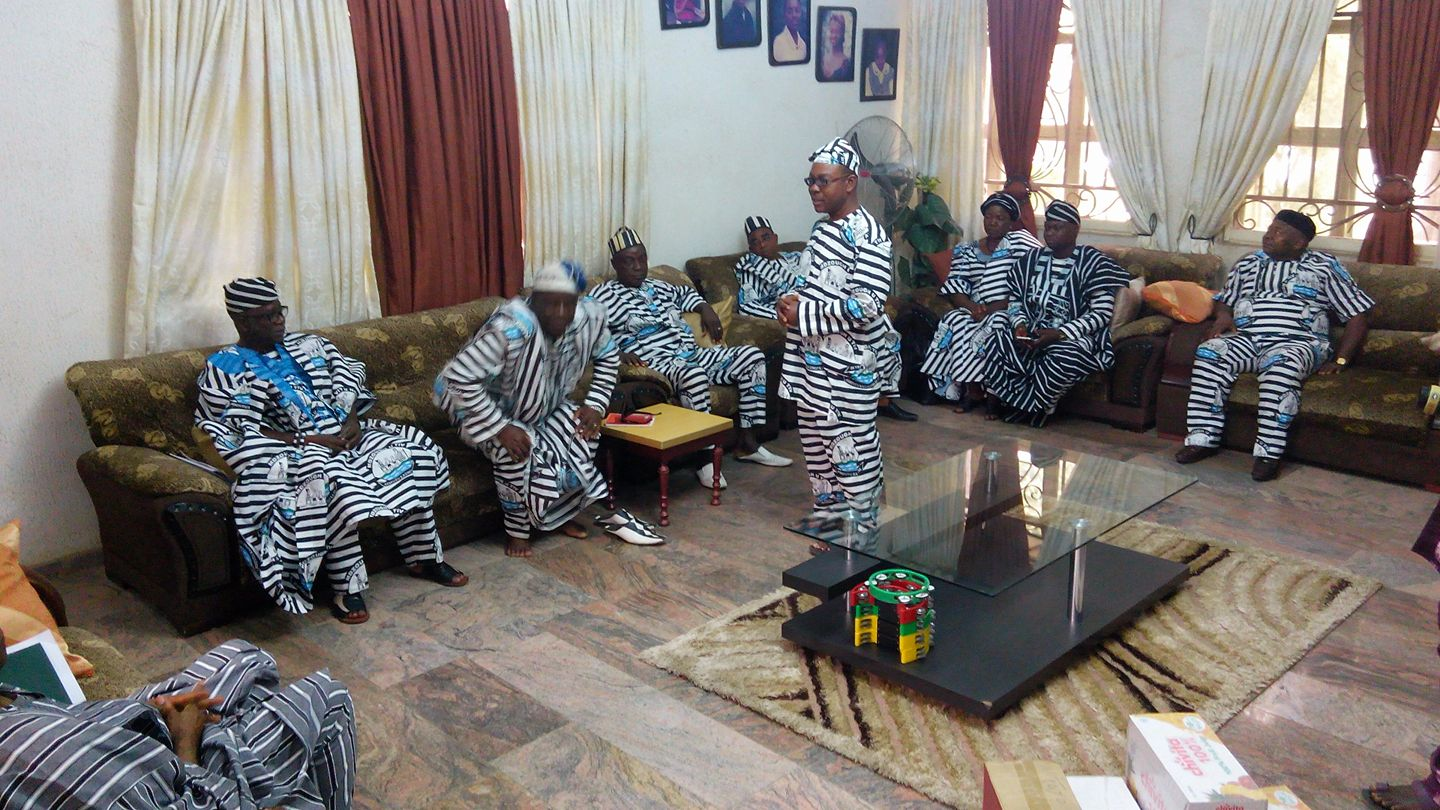
The Mutual Union of Tivs (MUTA)

Members of the Tiv group are found in many areas across the globe, such as the United States and United Kingdom. In these countries, they hold unions, known as MUT (Mzough U Tiv, or Mutual Union of Tiv in English), where members can assemble and discuss issues concerning their people across the world, but especially back in Nigeria. The arm of the MUT serving the United States of America is known as MUTA (Mzough U Tiv ken Amerika, or Mutual Union of the Tiv in America), for instance.

== Language ==
The Tiv people have maintained their history through an oral tradition, and the modern Tiv people have continued to speak the language. There is no evidence of an ancient script or other written form of the language.

The first academic reference to the language was made by Sigismund Koelle in 1854 based on contact with freed slaves in Sierra Leone according to his study Polyglotta Africana.

The language's classification has been debated as either semi-Bantu or bantu. Sir Johnston Harry H. classified it in 1919 as Semi-Bantu, as did Talbot P. Amaury in 1926. However, in 1933, Roy Clive Abraham, together with the South African missionary, Rev W. A. Malherbe, classified it as bantu after making a complete linguistic study of the language. Abraham stated that the language vocabulary of the Tiv people and the East African Nyanza group have many similarities.

== Society and culture ==
=== Religion and culture ===
The Tiv are predominantly Christians. Christianity dates back to 1911 when the first Dutch missionaries from Dutch Reformed Church of South Africa arrived at the Tiv village in Katsina-Ala local government of Benue State called Sai. They established the N.K.S.T. There are other Tiv practices such as akombo, tsav, etc.

=== Dressing (A'nger) ===
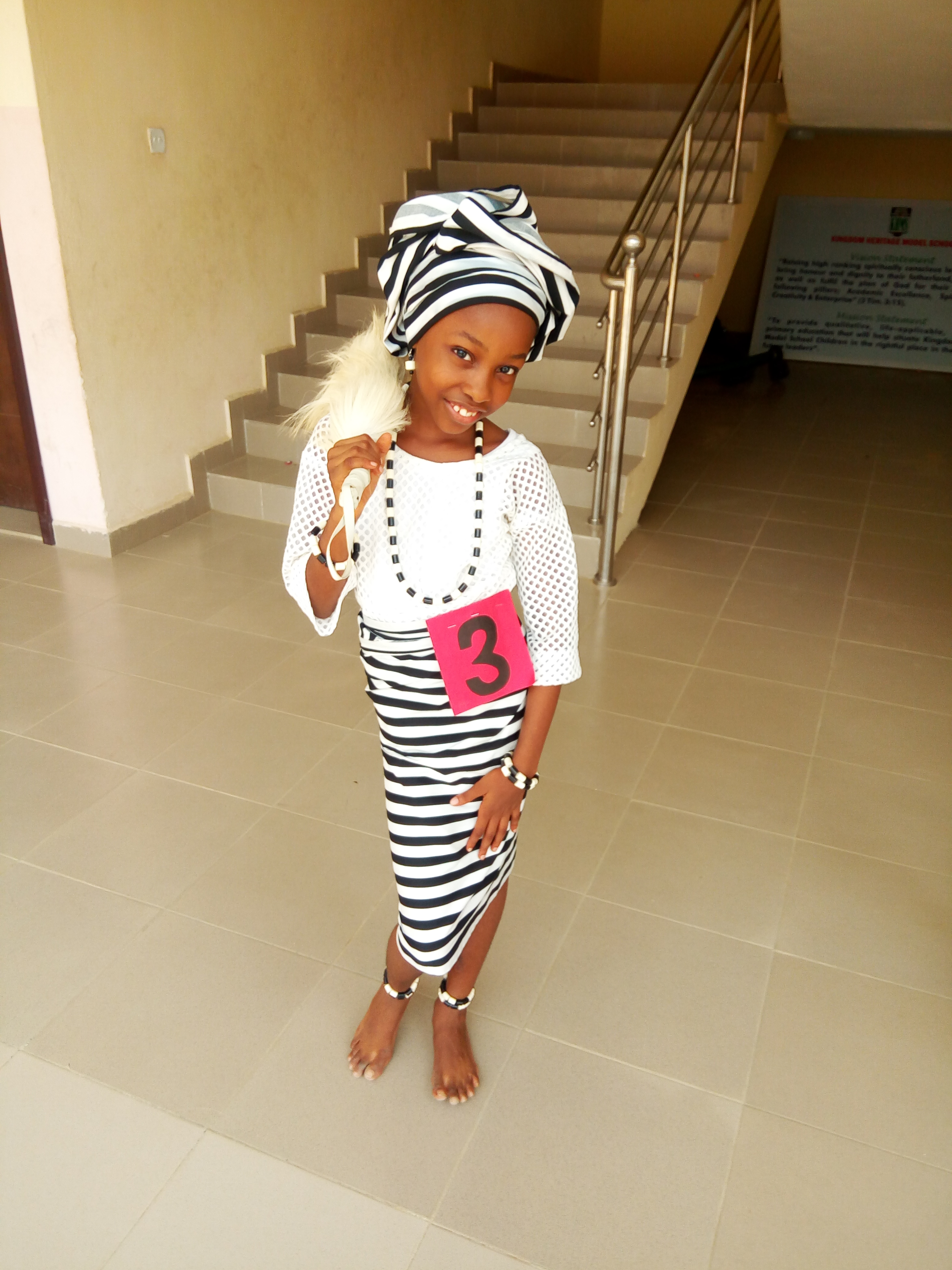
Tiv attire

The traditional attire is the black-and-white-striped a'nger. When the Tiv people arrived at their current location several centuries earlier, they discovered that the zebra they used to hunt for meat and skin, used for ceremonial attire, was not native to the area. When they acquired the skill of the loom, they decided to honor their heritage by weaving a cloth with black-and-white stripes, reminiscent of the zebra skin; this would then be made the preferred attire. Initially, it was a simple cloth to be draped around the torso. Nowadays, it is made into elaborate robes, such as those worn by the traditional rulers and elders – from the Tor Tiv downwards.

The black-and-white color of the necklaces worn by the traditional rulers has been chosen to match the robes.

=== Circumcision and body scarification ===
In Tiv mythology and history, Circumcision is almost as old as the Tiv language itself. Tiv who is the progenitor of the Tiv people had two sons; Ichongo (which means circumcised), Ipusu (which means uncircumcised). The two sons are the two major houses on which the Tiv kingship is rotated upon.

Circumcision has evolved with time among the Tiv people. Today, it is performed a few days after childbirth at the hospitals. Circumcision practiced in Central Africa among the Bantu peoples evolved as each group spread out.

Between the 18th and 20th centuries, the Tiv circumcised the male children when they became teenagers. A pickaxe (ityogh) was the tool of choice and then a razor blade (atsem) became popular in the 20th century.

During the Tiv-Fulani cohabitation, the Tiv people carried no ethnic facial marks nor any bodily cicatrices. After the separation with the Fulani, they adopted some distinct body tattoos in other to distinguish themselves from other tribes just the way the Fulani did.

The young men tattooed their faces, pierced their ears and sometimes sharpened their teeth. The young ladies tattooed their abdomens and pierced their ears.

=== Music and entertainment ===
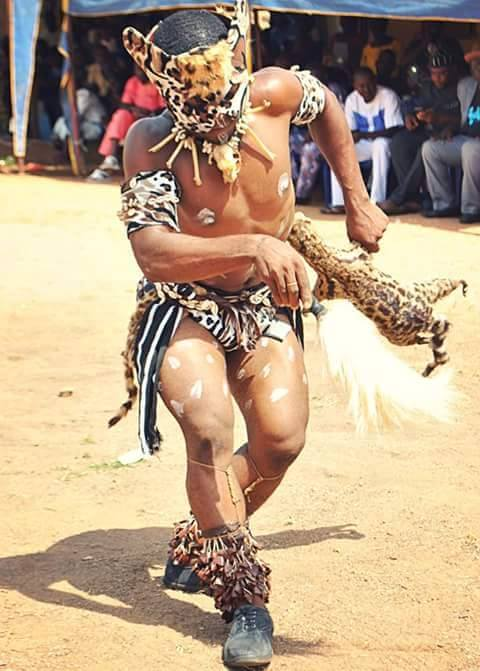
Tiv cultural dance, the cat dance (tsue tsele)

Locally made musical instruments were traditionally used for political, ceremonial communication and entertainment. The key instruments follow.

==== Kakaki ====
The kakaki is a royal trumpet used in many West African groups in Nigeria, Niger, Chad and Burkina Faso. This is an instrument used to convey special messages to the people of the community, such as the birth of the child of the King, his naming ceremony, the crowning of a new king, or to gather people together during the marriage ceremony of the king and the king's son's marriage ceremony. This instrument was used to convey all the messages to the people to assemble at the square for the ceremony. When there is an enemy attack on the community, a warning sound of the Kakaki is blown to alert those who can defend the society and every citizen to be alert.

==== Ilyu ====
A light wooden instrument, the ilyu was used to pass messages to the people of the village, probably for the invitation of the people for a particular meeting of the elders at the king's palace or for the people to gather at the market square for a message from or by the king. Up until today, it is the main instrument for the celebration of newly wedded couples (marriage reception ceremony or Kwase-kuhan).

==== Indyer ====
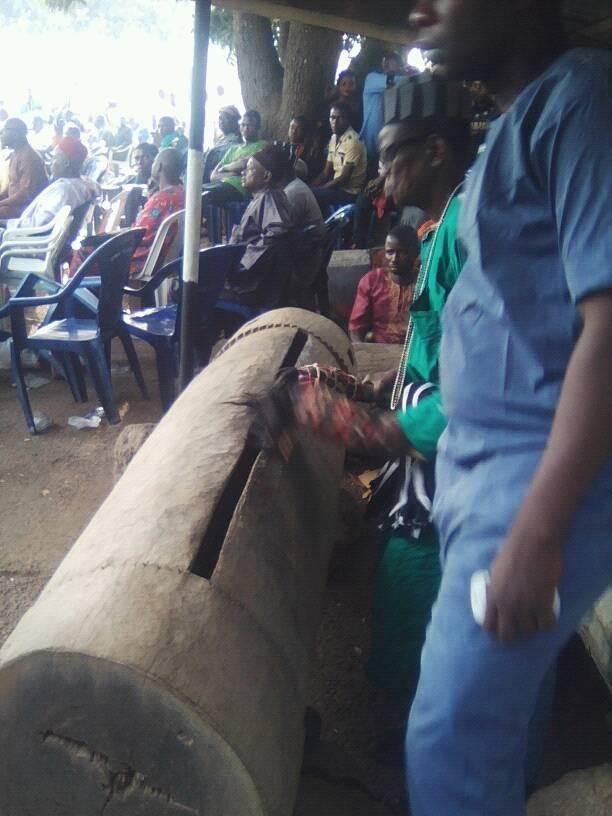
A Tiv indyer at a burial

The indyer is a heavy wooden instrument carved out of mahogany trunk through some mysterious way; myth has it that a chosen carver turns into a worm to create the large hollow in the cut trunk, leaving only a small opening (like in a medical operation). This belief is perhaps due to the fact that the carvers are reluctant to explain the technique employed for such artistic finesse. The indyer, believed to be connected with high magico-spiritual potency, is not played for secular purposes except for special occasions as sanctioned by the elders. It is used to communicate the death of an important personality in the community or to communicate a serious happening in the community, like a call to war.

==== Akya ====
It is used together with the agbande (drums) combined with the ageda at festivals to pass a message across to the people for a call for the display of culture.

==== Adiguve ====
It is an instrument like a violin, used for music and dances in conjunction with Agbande (Agbande) at festivals and dance occasions, sometimes to announce the death of a leader or an elder of the community. During this period it is played sorrowfully for the mourning of the dead. It is mostly played at funerals.

==== Gbande ====
Agbande (plural) are a set of crafted wooden musical instruments at festivals. They are particularly large drums and played by the young men of the community. Special drum beats communicate special messages and music for upcming festivals and during the festivals, for instance, royal occasions such as the coronation and funeral.

==== Ortindin (Ortyom) – Messenger ====
Usually, he is chosen by the elders of the community to do errands for the elders and the leader of the community. He is sent out to the heads of the neighbouring families for a crucial meeting at the head of all the leaders of the community.

==== Kolugh ku Bua ====
This is an instrument similar to the shofar, made out of cow horns. There are farmers' associations that use this instrument when they have a job to do; for instance, when they are invited to make ridges on a piece of land, the Public Relations Officer (PRO) of the association will use this medium to wake up the members for the work they have for that day.

Indigenous communication is not only vertical, from the rulers to the subjects, but is also horizontal. Individuals communicate with society through physical and metaphysical means. A farm owner, for example, may mount a charm conspicuously on his farm in order to stress private ownership and to scare off human intruders.

The fear of herbalists and witches influences social behaviour considerably.

Rainmakers communicate their power to disrupt events through various psychological means. Village sectors in Africa communicate mostly via the marketplace of ideas contributed by traditional religion, observances, divination, mythology, age-grades, the Chiefs courts, the elder's square, secret and title societies, the village market square, the village drum (gbande) men, indeed the total experiences of the villager in his environment.

Unlike the mass media, access to the native media is culturally determined and not economic. Only the selected group of young men or the elders can disseminate information generally. The young only disseminate general information about events and the social welfare of their communities using the media mentioned above.

The Tiv people of Benue state still practise some of this traditional system of communication, using the Kakais, Agbande, Indyer, Adiguve, Ilyu, etc. Nevertheless, the increase in the western world media is threatening the cultural communication system.

Many of the communities in Benue state still use these instruments to convey messages to the people of their community, and it is helping a great deal, since there is a language barrier between people with the introduction of the western world's means of communication, using a western language (English) to convey information.

=== Drama ===
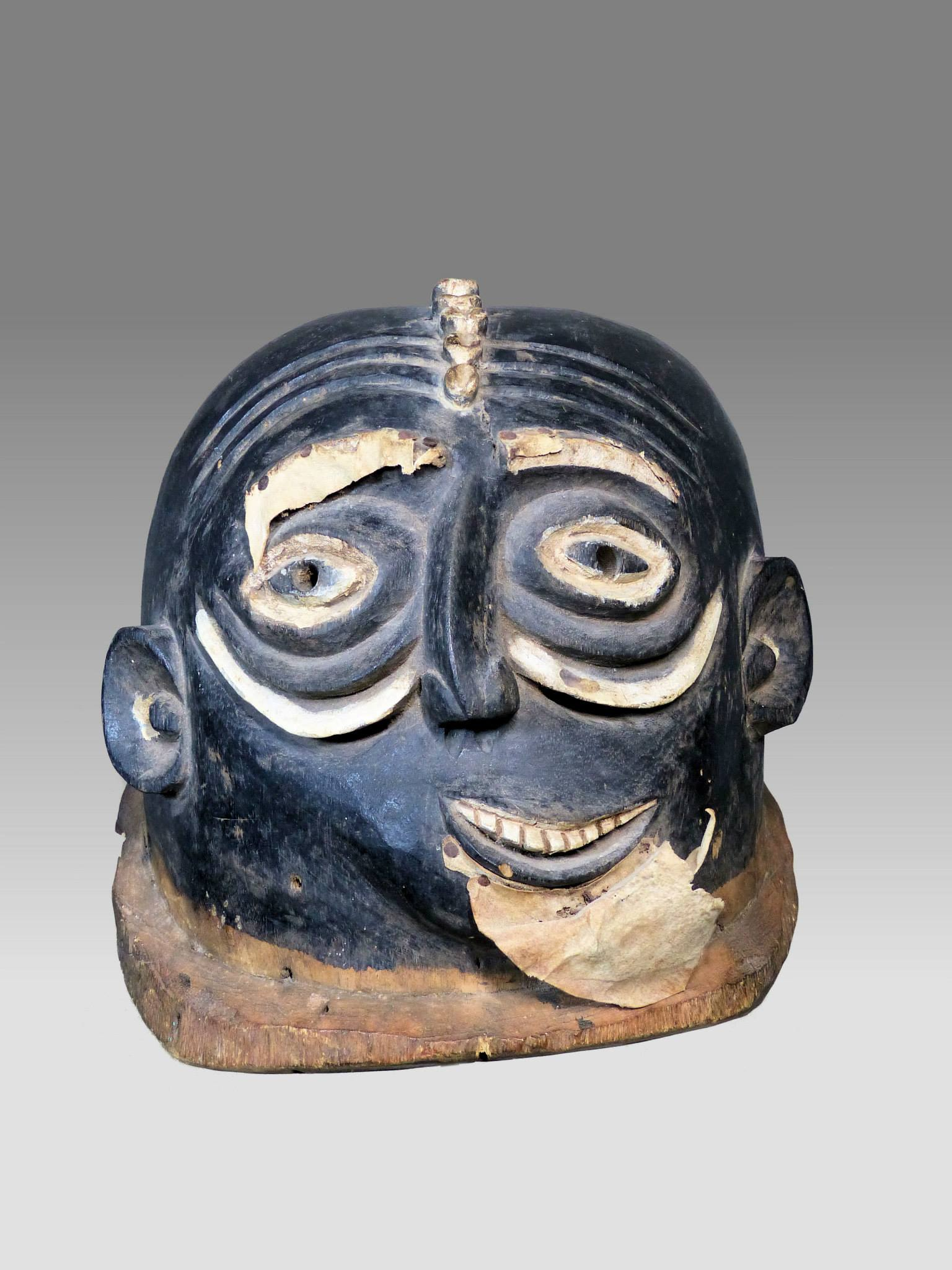
A 1960s kwagh-hir mask

The Tiv use a style of performing arts called Kwagh-hir. It is a storytelling method which uses carved masks and puppetry as a form of masquerade. Masquerade is used as a way for individuals of Tiv culture to express themselves. The Tiv use this style as a way to hide their identity and take the role of spiritual beings known as adzov. The performers hide their identities, only to be revealed by their individual styles at the end of the performances.

Tiv plays The Tiv use their plays as a way to tell traditional legends, retell events, and politics. A few popular plays in Tiv culture include:

- A Close Shave - Chris Kyoive
- Sons of Akpe - Boniface Leva
- Adan Wade - Suemo Chia

=== Traditional marriage ===
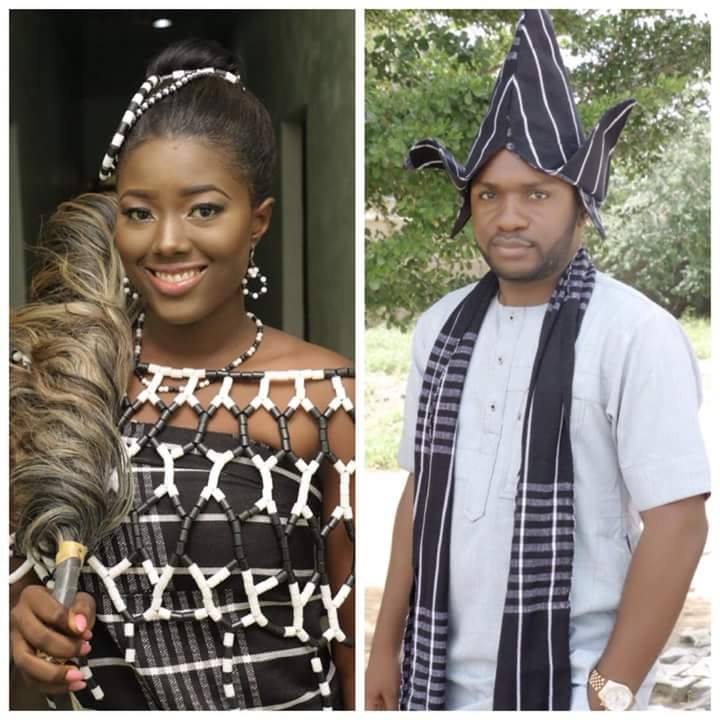
Tiv bride and groom

Marriage is a prominent feature of Tiv culture. Traditional marriage among the Tiv is still seen as a significant cultural occasion. Tiv's marriage is not just the union between a husband and a wife but the entire family.

Yamshe: This type of marriage was practiced by the fore-fathers and involves the exchange of sisters to marry couples. Previously, two men might swap sisters or families, exchanging daughters for spouses. A man looking for a wife who comes across another looking for a wife will exchange daughters or sisters.

Kwase Tsuen: This is a union induced by captivity. A man would kidnap a woman forcefully, or a family would do it for their son. It is used in some remote Tiv areas.

Iye: In Tiv land, courtship or dating is the norm. The man meets a woman, pays her additional visits, and gives his family some things. Sometimes the woman and the man decide to run away secretly with the intention of getting married without parental consent, and sometimes the woman is taken home after the man pays the bride price.

Kwase- Kemen: This is a type of marriage that is currently practiced in Tiv Land: bride-price marriage. After extensive courtship (Iye), the man visits the woman's family, pays the money, and offers the gifts the woman's family listed.

In 1927, the intricate Tiv system of trade marriage was abolished and bride-wealth marriages took its place

==== Attire ====
Tiv people dress in vibrant colors, and the groom and bride's outfit appears to be among the most significant aspects of a wedding. The garments produced with A'nger material have black and white stripes, which are the most constant feature. Without a variety of accessories, such as headpieces, bracelets, or necklaces, wedding apparel is also unattainable. Beads in shades of black and white are the most common type.

=== Cuisine ===
The common Tiv food are mostly solid, cooked, pounded or prepared with hot water. They are mostly carbohydrates or by-products of yams (iyou), cocoyam (mondu), cassava (alogo), beans (alev), maize (kyuleke), etc. The Tiv are known to be the food basket of Nigeria.

Tiv have been identified by the British with the sesame seed as the British named it Beni-seed because it was the major cash crop exported to Europe and other colonies from the Benue valley.

Some common Tiv foods are ruam kumen (pounded yam), ruam nahan (fufu), pete (yam pottage), Akuto (sweet potato pottage), akpukpa (Okpa), Ibyer (fermented cereal pudding) etc.

- Soups: Ichegh, Pocho, ager, ive, genger, atyever, tur, vambe, igyo, agbende ashwe, mngishim(garden egg soup), ashwe, Atuur, vegetable soup, ijôv (mushroom soup), aninge, furum`, adenger, gbungu, gbande.
- Tiv staples: Roasted yams, ahuma, Jollof rice, fried yams, kuese etc.
- Beverages: tyo, burukutu, atemba a suwanbin, ibyer.
- Snacks: Peanuts and sesame (beni-seed), asondo (dried sweet potatoes), igbough ahi (roasted or boiled bambara nuts), mzembe (roasted pears), huu (roasted termites), kuese (beans cake), N'gyata (peanut paste).

Tiv cultural dishes

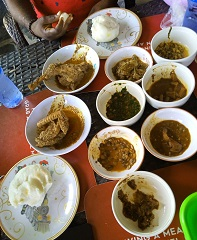
pounded yam and assorted soup

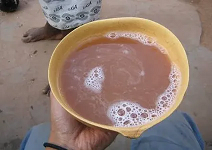
Burukutu

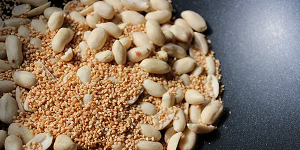
peanuts and sesame

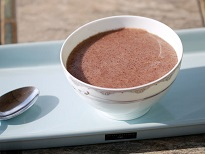
Ibyer

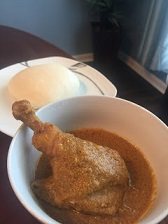
kyegh sha ishwa

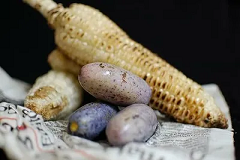
Mzembe or pears

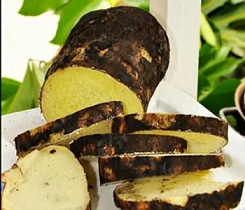
Roasted yam

== Demographics ==
The Tiv people are predominantly farmers. They usually have large farming settlements with populations ranging from a thousand to tens of thousands in most villages in Nigeria where they find arable land. Examples of these settlements could be found in Ekiti state, Kwara State, Kogi state, Niger state, Ondo state, Ogun state, Oyo state, etc. However, they do not lay claims to these lands and usually have some kind of agreements with the host communities such as renting of farmlands and paying of local taxes to the local governing authorities like chiefs and local government elected officials. The only ancestral lands they call home are Southwest Region (Cameroon), sparse settlements in the Northwest Region (Cameroon) and in the Nigerian states of Taraba, Nasarawa, Parts of southern Adamawa, South-Eastern part of Plateau, Northern parts of Cross River and Benue.

=== Cameroon ===
According to the 2005 census results in Cameroon, there were 87,252 Tivoid people at Akwaya sub-division, located at the south-western border of Cameroon Manyu division, with Mamfe as its capital, which is 74 km away from the south eastern Nigerian border. There are also sparse and isolated populations in the Northwestern region especially in Menchum, Mezam and Momo departments. The Cameronian Tiv are well educated and live in Anglophone Cameroon as their ancestral lands, while a few others live in the francophone region. They are mostly farmers but others work in the government. Some of their towns and villages are Njawbaw(Njobo), Assumbo, Ballin, Batanga, Bagundu, Bakinjaw, Assaka etc.

The Ikyurav-tiev of Katsina-Ala were some of the last Nigerian Tiv people to migrate from here. They are still known in Cameroon as the Ekol.

Some of them have an additional dialect to the main Tiv language. For instance, the Utanga(e) people speak, write and sing in Tiv but also speak the Utanga dialect which has no writing system and has a lexical similarity of 70% with Tiv proper. This variation is because of the proximity and centuries of cohabitation with other Cameroonian tribes. However, the clans in Nigeria do not communicate in these variant dialects except for a few in Cross River State due to their proximity to Cameroon. The Iyon in Kwande do not speak an additional dialect beside the Tiv language but, the Iyon in Cameroon do. Also, the Utange in Ushongo which is the largest of all the Utanga clan have no idea of the existence of such dialect.

The Cameroonian Tiv peoples are; Utanga(e), Bitare, Mesaka, Iyive, Ceve or Becheve, Evant, Eman, Ipulo, Caka, Undir, Oliti etc. They together with the Tiv in Nigeria share the same culture, language, History, Religion, and Tradition. The major homogenus population here occupy a total of 99 villages in the Akwaya sub-division covering an area of 3,682 square kilometers.

Notable people
Justice Paul Abine Ayah ---- Presidential aspirant and Justice of the Supreme Court of Cameroon.
Aka Martin Tyoga ---- member of parliament for Akwaya constituency

=== Nasarawa state ===
The locations with the highest concentration of Tiv people in Nasarawa state are Doma, Nasarawa, Lafia, Obi, Keana, and Awe Local Government areas.

Here they live in the southern part of the state which is also the south senatorial district. The Tiv clans here are the Isherev, Utyondu, Nongov and kunav. They have lived here since the 16th century which predates the colonial era. They live with other tribes like the Koro, Gwandara, Kamberi, and Alago.

In the early 60s and colonial times, The Lafia division was different from the munshi (Tiv) division. The population of the Tiv in the Lafia division in 1963 was recorded to be 289, 559 people. The total population of the Lafia division in 1963 was 424, 219 people. This gave the Tiv 49.2 percent of the total population. The 1991 census however did not show demographics by tribes but this alone makes Tiv the dominant ethnic group in the Nasarawa south senatorial district.

Notable people
Prof Emmanuel Kucha--- former VC University of Agriculture, Makurdi
Hon Athanasius Tyo --- 1979 – 1983 House of representatives Awe, Keana, Doma federal constituency.
Emmanuel Orshio – 1983 House of representatives Awe, Keana, Doma federal constituency.
Solomon Ihuman --- Commissioner for culture and tourism.
Philip Audu -------- Permanent Secretary water resources.

=== Taraba state ===
The Ukum, Ugondo, Shitile, Kunav, Gaav and Shangev clans are the predominant Tiv clans in Taraba state. They were some of the first migrants together with the Chamba tribes between 1750 and 1800. Their largest populations are in Bali, Donga, Ibi, Gassol, Takum, Gashaka, Kurmi and Wukari Local Government Areas.

There are also other Tivoid groups like the Batu, Abon, Bitare and Ambo in Sardauna Local government area.

Some of the popular towns and villages with homogenous Tiv populations are; Chanchangi, Tor Damsa, Tse Afogba, Tse Kpandi, Tor luam, Deke, China etc.

Notable people
Hon. Charles Tangu Gaza - 1959 Federal House of Representatives.
Hon. Simon I. Awuah- Gongola State House of Assembly in 1979–1983.
Hon. David K. Mtwem - Gongola State House of Assembly in 1979–1983.
Hon. Simon I. Musa - First Chairman of Wukari Local Government in 1979–1983.
Hon. Hitler Gbaondo - Takum Federal Constituency in the House Representative in 1979–1983.
Hon. Tsetim Gwakyaa - Donga Federal Constituency in the House of Representatives in 1983.
Mr. Daniel Orkuma Nav- Former Permanent Secretary, Government House administration.
Mrs. Rebecca Torpeva - Former Adviser to the Governor on political affairs.
Dr. Tor-Agbidye - Former adviser to the Governor.
Mr. Emmanuel Orabunde- Former INEC Commissioner.
Anna Darius Ishaku - Former first lady of Taraba state.
Shaakaa Chira - Auditor-General of the Federation

=== Plateau state ===
There are over 50 tribes in Plateau State. The first seven in order of numerical strength are; Berom, Mwaghavul, Tarok, Angas, Jawara, Bassa and Tiv.

Tiv-speaking populations are found in Langtang South, Shendam, Qua'an-Pan and Wase Local government areas. The settlements stretch from Ibi in Taraba state and Awe/Lafia in Nasarawa state into Plateau state. The populations here were carved into this state as a result of states creation by the Nigerian government.

=== Cross River state ===
They occupy the northern parts of; Yala, Bekwarra, Obudu and Obanliku Local Government areas. These groups are some of the clans in Kwande local government area, Vandeikya Local government area, Konshisha local government area and Southwest Cameroon. These are the Tiv populations that were left in Crossriver state during the creation of Benue state in February 1976.

The sub groups here are the Kunav, Gaav, Ikyurav, Utanga(e), Ceve or Becheve, Evant, Eman etc.

=== Benue state ===
They occupy Buruku, Gboko, Guma, Gwer East, Gwer West, Katsina Ala, Konshisha, Kwande, Logo, Makurdi, Tarkaa, Ushongo, Ukum and Vandeikya Local Government Areas.

== Notable people ==
=== Civil servants, politicians and activists ===
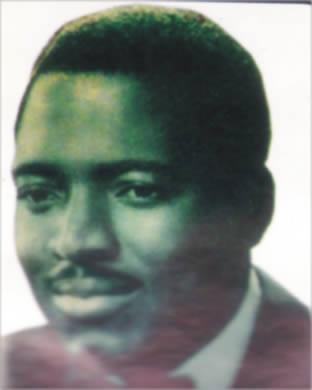
J. S. Tarkaa, politician, human rights activist

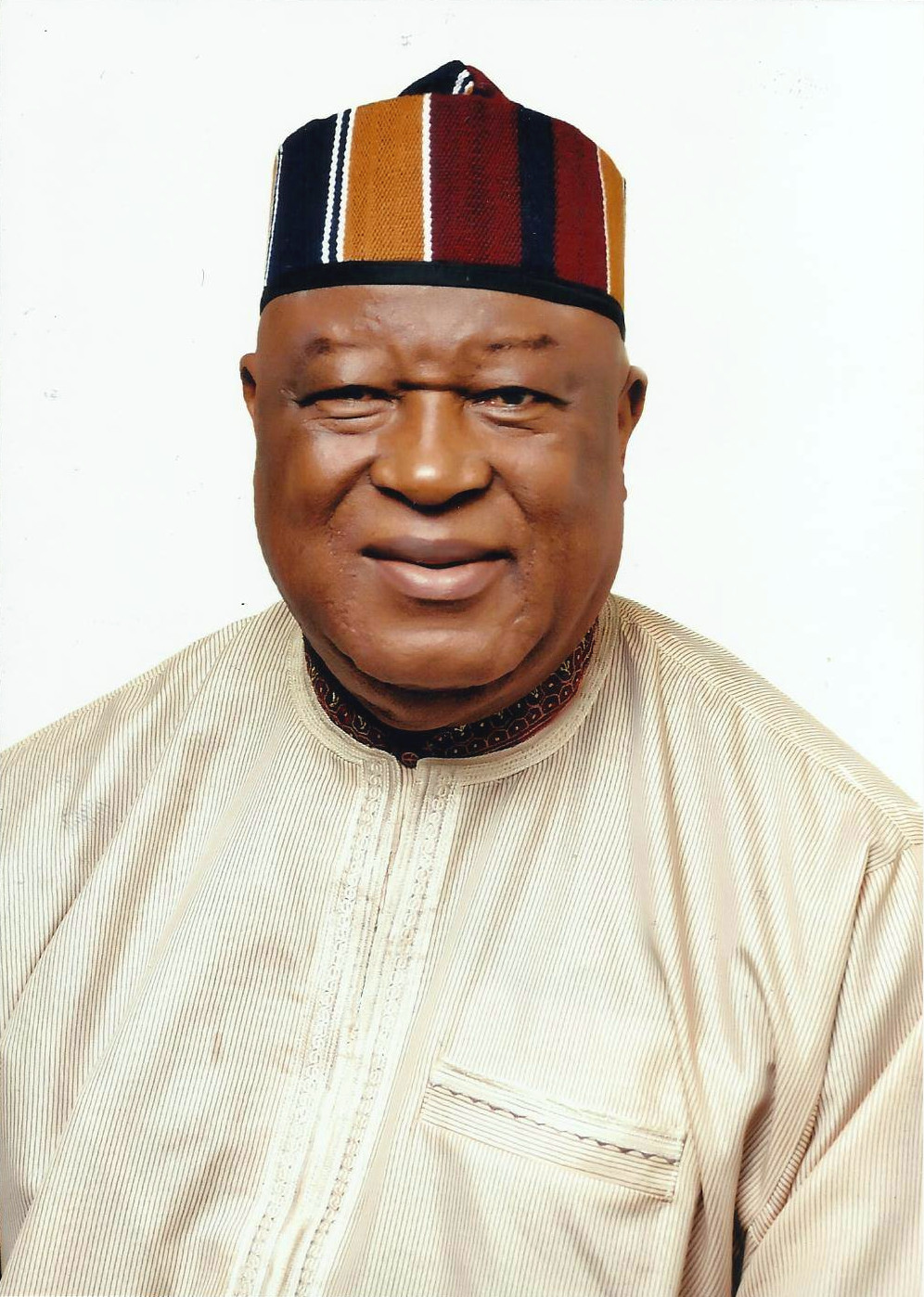
Barnabas Gemade, former PDP presidential candidate

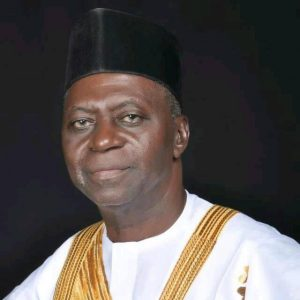
Gen. John Gbor, APGA presidential candidate for 2019 general elections

- Joseph Tarka, politician, human rights activist
- Paul Unongo, politician, human rights activist
- Barnabas Gemade, former PDP party chairman
- Aper Aku, first civilian governor of Benue state
- George Akume, former senate minority leader
- Iyorchia Ayu, former senate president
- Prof. Ignatius Akaayar Ayua, SAN, OFR, FNIALS, former Permanent Secretary Ministry of Justice, Author
- Chaha Biam, former speaker house of representative
- Gabriel Suswam, politician former governor of Benue state
- Terhemba Shija, politician, academic, poet.
- Samuel Ortom, former State Governor
- Hyacinth Alia, the current State Governor
- Daniel Saror, former minority leader
- Michael Aondoakaa, former attorney general of Nigeria
- Moses Adasu, politician, former Benue state governor
- A. I. Katsina-Alu, former chief justice of Nigeria
- Ambrose Feese, former minister of works and housing.
- Iyorwuese Hagher, former senate deputy chief whip, minister and envoy
- Yima Sen, intellectual and radical political activist
- Jerome Tilley Gyado, Business man, entrepreneur.
- Emmanuel Udende, Senator from Benue state
- Titus Zam, Senator from Benue state
- Herman Hembe, former house of reps member
- Dickson Tarkighir, house of reps member
- Asema Achado , house of reps member.

=== Military and law enforcement ===
- Gideon Orkar, Nigerian Military officer.
- Victor Malu, former Chief of Army Staff
- Joseph Akahan, first Nigerian Chief of Army Staff
- Lawrence Igyuse Doki, WW 2 veteran and emancipator of Makurdi
- Joseph Akaagerger, Former Governor of Katsina state
- John Mark Inienger, former ECOMOG commander
- Commissioner Emmanuel Allagh, Former and prominent commissioner of Nigerian Police
- Farida Waziri, former EFCC Chairperson
- John Kpera, Military governor of Anambra state.
- General Gabriel Kpamber, former ECOMOG commander
- Prof. Col. James T. Gire, Virginia Military Institute, USA

=== Athletes ===
- Terna Suswam, football player
- Dominic Iorfa Sr, football player
- Dominic Iorfa Jr football player
- Timothy Anjembe, football player
- David Tyavkase, football player
- Jeff Varem, NBA D-league player
- Terna Nande, American football player
- Apollo Crews, WWE wrestler
- Francisca Ordega, Nigerian national team soccer player
- Mimisen Iyorhe, FIFA referee
- Fanendo Adi
- Gift Orban, Nigerian footballer.
- Barnabas Imenger Jr., Nigerian super eagles striker
- Russel Orhii, World Champion Powerlifter
- Moses Kpakor Former BBL Hawks FC, BCC Lions F.C., Electricity FC, Abiola Babes F.C. and Nigerian National team player.
- Amir Angwe Former BCC Lions F.C., Julius Berger FC and Nigerian National team player.
- Tom Iorpenda, football player

=== Culture ===
- Makir Zakpe, Tor Tiv I
- Gondo Aluor, Tor-Tiv II
- Akperan Orshi, Tor-Tiv III
- Alfred Akawe Torkula, Tor Tiv IV
- James Ortese Iorzua Ayatse, Tor-Tiv V
- Akiga Sai, autobiographer and historian

=== Academics ===
- James Ayatse --- Tor Tiv V and past VC Federal University, Dutsin-Ma and UAM
- Aondoaver Tarhule ---- President Illinois State University, USA
- Emmanuel Iornumbe Kucha --- past VC University of Agriculture, Makurdi
- Vershima Daniel Uza—past VC University of Agriculture, Makurdi
- Charity Angya --- Past VC Benue State University
- Richard Kimbir --- past VC University of Agriculture, Makurdi
- Erastus Orseer Gyang-Gyang --- past VC University of Agriculture, Makurdi
- Msugh Moses Kembe --- past VC Benue State University
- Akase P. Sorkaa --- past VC Benue State University
- David Ker --- past VC Benue State University
- Charles Gbilekaa Vajime --- Past VC Benue State University
- Tor Joe Iorapuu --- present VC Benue State University

== Issues ==
Nigeria has battled insecurity for over 2 decades now. The primary perpetrators have been some Islamist fundamentalist groups like the Fulani herdsmen, Boko Haram and Islamic State – West Africa Province.

The biggest victims of these attacks have been the Tiv people from mostly Taraba state, Nasarawa state and Benue State. The fulani herdsmen have been notorious for sacking whole villages and communities and occupying them especially in places like Taraba and Nasarawa states. The best examples of these attacks that have gained international media attention are The Yelwata massacre, The 2021 Nasarawa massacre, The April 2022 Benue State killings among others.

The Tiv protests together with the media outings from the elite have demonstrated that most Tiv people have lost confidence in the Nigerian government, the judiciary and its military. The unrelenting attacks have brought distrust where they accuse the Federal government of censorship, no security response, no plans to return them to their homelands, no provisions for Internally Displaced Peoples camps, no arrests or prosecutions made(even when the Fulani organizations like, Miyetti Allah repeatedly claim responsibility of such attacks on live television).

There has also been accusations of complicity from the Tiv through various Nigerian news channels such as Channels TV and legal battles have been pursued against the governors of Nasarawa and Taraba states. Such actions and sentiments arise because the Tiv complain of the selective nature of the repeated attacks on them among other minority Christian ethnic groups like the Jukun, Alago and the Chamba, the lack of provisions for Internally Displaced Peoples camps especially when other Christian minority groups (which they assume to be collateral damage) are provided these camps but the Tiv are denied access to any even when they seek refuge in such camps, negative media outings against the Tiv by these governors etc. Some of the aggrieved victims believe the reason for these state governments complicity to be a political calculation to use the insecurity in the country as a tool to depopulate and displace them in hopes for proper political dominance from their ethnic groups when the fulani herdsmen crisis will be resolved. In Taraba state alone, 283 Tiv villages in Wukari local government area, 69 villages in Donga local government area and 37 villages in Ibi Local government area have been sacked leaving 300,000 people displaced. The governor of Taraba state Agbu Kefas and of Nasarawa state Abdullahi Sule have also been taken to courts separately by the Tiv people for land grabbing and use of the police and military for unlawful detentions and intimidation.

The Tiv victims also accuse the Nigerian military and the police stationed at these places of collusions because of previous warnings and alarms made to them by various groups and foreign activists like the ex-Texas mayor Mike Arnold and many others before attacks and how they don’t respond at all or show any concern about them and also deny previous knowledge or warnings. This has prompted other activists and religious leaders like Frank Utoo and the Roman Catholic Bishop of Makurdi diocese Wilfred Chikpa Anagbe to seek international help from the Vatican and other Christian groups in Europe and the USA which metamorphosed into the 2025 United States strikes in Nigeria, sactions have been also implemented on some leaders of the Fulani herdsmen, Miyetti Allah Cattle Breeders Association of Nigeria and also, designated as terrorist groups.

== See also ==
- Tiv language
- Ate-u-tiv
