= Tiv language =

Southern Bantoid language of Nigeria

Tiv
- Tiv
- Native to: Nigeria
- Region: Benue State, Cross River State, Plateau State, Taraba State
- Ethnicity: Tiv
- Native speakers: 4.6 million (2020)
- Language family: Niger–Congo?: Atlantic–Congo; Volta-Congo; Benue–Congo; Bantoid; Southern Bantoid; Tivoid; Central Tivoid; Tiv

Language codes
- ISO 639-2: tiv
- ISO 639-3: tiv
- Glottolog: tivv1240

Tiv is a Tivoid language spoken in some states in North Central Nigeria, with some speakers in Cameroon. It had over 4.6 million speakers in 2020. The largest population of Tiv speakers are found in Benue state in Nigeria. The language is also widely spoken in some Nigerian states namely, Plateau, Taraba, Nasarawa, Cross River, Adamawa, Kaduna, and Abuja. It is by far the largest of the Tivoid languages, a group of languages belonging to the Southern Bantoid languages.

== History and classification ==
The first reference to the Tiv language (dzwa Tiv) was made by Sigismund Koelle (1854) from liberated slaves from Sierra Leone. Johnston Harry H (1919) classified it as a peculiar language among the Semi-Bantu languages, and Talbot P. Amaury (1926) concurred. Roy Clive Abraham (1933), who has made the most complete linguistic study of Tiv, classifies it as Bantu, stating that its vocabulary is more similar to the East African Nyanza group of Bantu languages than to Ekoi or other neighbouring languages. Malherbe (1933) agrees with Abraham that Tiv is essentially Bantu.

All material on Tiv seems to point to a recent expansion, perhaps in the early 15th century.

== Geographic distribution ==
Tiv is widely spoken in the States of Benue, Nasarawa, Plateau, Taraba, Cross River,Adamawa, Kaduna, and Abuja, Nigeria. Other parts of Nigeria also speak Tiv.

=== Nigeria ===
==== Benue State ====
Tarka, Makurdi, Gwer East, Gwer West, Ukum, Logo, Konshisha, Gboko, Kwande, Vandeikya, Katsina Ala, Guma, Buruku, and Ushongo Local Government Areas.

==== Nassarawa State ====
Doma, Nasarawa, Lafia, Obi, Keana, and Awe Local Government Areas

==== Plateau State ====
Tiv-speaking populations are found in Langtang South, Shendam, Qua’an-Pan and Wase area councils.

==== Taraba State ====
Bali, Donga, Ibi, Gassol, Takum, Gashaka, Kurmi and Wukari Local Government Areas.

Together with thousands of other Tivoid groups like the Batu, Abon, Bitare and Ambo in Sardauna Local government area.

==== Cross River State ====
Yala, Bekwarra, Obudu and Obanliku Local Government Areas.

Together with thousands of other tivoid groups like the Utanga, Ceve or Becheve, Evant, Eman etc.

=== Cameroon ===
There are 1900 Tiv households with approximately 20,000 people at the south-western border of Cameroon Manyu division, with Mamfe as its capital, which is 74 km away from the south-eastern Nigerian border. The paramount ruler is Zaki Abaajul, who has the Tiv and Ulitsi as his subjects. The Cameroonian Tiv are well educated and live in Anglophone Cameroon as their ancestral land, while a few others live in the francophone region. They are mostly farmers but others work in the government.

Although some Nigerian Tiv people are unaware of some of the Tiv people of the Cameroon because of the international border, these groups always regard themselves as Tiv. Some of them have an additional dialect to the main Tiv language. These Tiv groups are; Bitare, Mesaka, Iyive, Ceve or Becheve, Evant, Eman, Ipulo, Caka etc. They together with the Tiv in Nigeria share the same culture, History, Religion, and Tradition. They are basically the same people.

== Dialects ==
Tiv speakers can understand each other across their territory, although the Hyarev people have distinct word stress and intonation that differ from those of other speakers. Regional accents (ham) exist.

== Phonology ==
=== Vowels ===
	Front	Central	Back
Close	i		u
Near-close	ɪː		ʊː
Mid	e		oː
Open-mid		ɜː	ɔ, ɔː
Open		a, aː	ɒ

- Vowel sounds are phonetically nasalized before nasal consonants.
- /a/ can be freely heard as [æ̃] or [ɑ̃] before a nasal consonant.

=== Consonants ===
		Bilabial	Labio- dental	Alveolar	Palato- alveolar	Palatal	Velar			Glottal
		Bilabial	Labio- dental	Alveolar	Palato- alveolar	Palatal	plain	lab.	pal.	Glottal
Stop	voiceless	p		t			k	kʷ	kʲ	
Stop	voiced	b		d			ɡ	ɡʷ	ɡʲ	
Stop	prenasal	ᵐb		ⁿd						
Affricate	voiceless			t͡s	t͡ʃ		k͡p			
Affricate	voiced			(d͡z)	d͡ʒ		ɡ͡b			
Affricate	prenasal			ⁿd͡z						
Fricative	voiceless		f	s	ʃ		(x)			h
Fricative	voiced		v	z			ɣ			
Nasal		m	(ɱ)	n		ɲ	ŋ			
Trill				r						
Approximant		w		l		j				

- /ɣ/ is heard phonetically as [x], but is often voiced as [ɣ].
- [ɱ] is heard in free variation in word-final positions.
- [d͡z] occurs in other dialects.

=== Tone ===
Tiv has three main tones (five if rising and falling are counted as separate tones instead of composites of existing tones). They are most importantly used in inflection.

=== Accents ===
The accents of Tiv are as follows:

- Ityoisha, spoken in the southeast, noted for its exaggerated palatalisation of vowels;
- Shitile, spoken by most Tiv east of the Katsina Ala River, apparently slower sounding than the other Tiv accents and slurs vowels into their neighbouring consonant;
- Ihyarev, which gives an exaggerated roll to the phoneme [r]~[l]
- Kparev, spoken in the centre and south-centre;
  - Kunav, a sub-group of Kparev, noted for its preference for [d͡ʒ] sounds where other Kparev use [d͡z].

Vocabulary, particularly plant and tool names, changes from one part of Tiv territory to the other.

== Orthography ==
Tiv is written using a Latin based alphabet. Modern Tiv orthography employs 25 letters, including the additional letter ô, and makes extensive use of digraphs and consonant clusters, such as gb, ts, and ny, to represent sounds not found in English. The orthography is primarily phonemic, with written symbols generally corresponding closely to spoken sounds. Tiv writing also incorporates tone marks and diacritical symbols to distinguish vowel quality, nasalization and tonal variation; for example, words such as tor may have different meanings depending on pronunciation and tone.

== Morphology ==
Tiv has nine noun classes.

== See also ==
- Tiv people
- Ate-u-tiv, a traditional Tiv hut used for reception and gathering

== Material in the Tiv language ==
- Mnyange Agbai: by Ihyel Kuvien: A Tiv-language novel
- The Long Shadows, A novel exploring the historical accounts and cultural traditions of the Tiv tribe
- Marem Tiv Doom: (Volumes 1 & 2) by Solomon JP: Recent literary works celebrating Tiv culture and heritage
- Wisdom of the Tiv: A Collection of proverbs: by Nguper Dooyum-Laha
- Adan Wade Kohol Ga: Senator Suemo Chia's classical Tiv novel
- Icighan Bibilo: New Testament in the Tiv language
- Gbenda Awambe: Jikeme Emmanuel’s film, re-titled in English as Bloody is the Way
