= Otank language =

Tivoid language of Nigeria

Otank
- Utanga, Utange
- Native to: Nigeria, Cameroon
- Native speakers: 15,000 (2006)
- Language family: Niger–Congo?: Atlantic–Congo; Benue–Congo; Southern Bantoid; Tivoid; Central (A); Otank

Language codes
- ISO 639-3: uta
- Glottolog: otan1238

Otank (Utanga) is a Tivoid language spoken by the Utanga group of tiv people in both Nigeria and Cameroon. It is used as a second language by Obanliku speakers.

== Features ==
It has no writing system and no dialect, and has a lexical similarity of 70% with Tiv proper, 60% with Iceve, 50% with Evant, and 40% with Eman and Mesaka

== Etymology ==
Utanga or Utange are tiv people, who live in Ushongo local government of Benue state Nigeria, Obanliku Local Government of Cross River State Nigeria and Akwaya sub-division of Manyu division of the western Cameroon.
