= Sardauna, Taraba State =

Local government area of Taraba State, Nigeria

Sardauna Mambilla Plateau
- LGA
- Interactive map of Sardauna
- Country: Nigeria
- State: Taraba State
- Local Government Headquarters: Gembu

Government
  - Local Government Chairman and the Head of the Local Government Council: Hon. Umaru

Population (2026)
  - Total: 395,211
- Time zone: UTC+01:00 (WAT)

Sardauna (formerly Mambilla) Local Government Area is located in the extreme southeast of Taraba State in Nigeria. It is synonymous with the Mambilla Plateau, which is dotted by many towns and villages. The capital of the LGA is Gembu, an ancient Mambilla settlement whose name is a corruption of "Gelmvu", the name of an ancient monarch of the area. Other ethnic groups from the mainstream Nigeria and neighbouring Cameroon Republic such as Hausa, Kanuri, Igbo, Banso, Kambu, Fulani, etc can be found in the commercial centres as business communities. Sardauna LGA is divided into eleven electoral wards namely: Gembu ‘A’, Gembu ‘B’, Kabri, Kakara, Magu, Mayo-Ndaga, Mbamnga, Ndum-Yaji, Nguroje, Titong, Warwar.

== Climate ==
In contrast to the rather steamy and humid climate of most other parts of southeastern Nigeria, the climate in this part of the country (owing to its altitude) is relatively cool; most days in the dry season the temperature will reach 20–23 °C (68–73 °F) and drop to 16–18 °C (61–64 °F) at night, whilst in the wet season these averages fall a couple of degrees at day and rise a bit at night.

== Languages ==
Sardauna LGA (the Nambilla Plateau) is highly linguistically diverse, with about two dozen distinct local dialects and languages (mostly Mambilla languages, other isolated sprinkling of other Bantoid languages, and Jukunoid languages.

- Mambilla language
- Ambo language, a bantoid language, actually a Tivoid language
- Áncá language
- Batu language a bantoid language, actually a Tivoid language
- Buru language of Kurmi LGA.
- Etkywan language
- Fum language
- Tiv language
- Kpan language
- Lamnso’ language, a Western Grassfields of Cameroon language around Kumbo, with businessmen in Mambilla;
- Limbum language, a Western Grassfields of Cameroon language, at Ndu, with businessmen in Mambilla;
- Fula language, a West Atlantic language from Qanar, Mauritania and Senegambia, whose presence in Mambilla are in the immediate past traceable to cattle movements from Ngaundere (Cameroon), Banyo (Cameroon), Bavenda Province (Cameroon), and from some parts of Nigeria.
- Tigon Mbembe language of Kurmi.
- Mbungnu or Mbunip dialect of Mambilla language
- Mvanip Dialect of Mambilla language of Mvanu at Magu area:
- Ndoola language mainly in Kurmi.
- Ndunda language, a Mambilla Dialect.
- Somyev language, a Mambilla dialect
- Viti language
- Vute language (another Mambilloid language, not traditionally spoken on Mambilla Plateau)
- Yamba language, another Western Grassfields of Cameroon language extending from Donga-Mantung in Cameroon to the southern fringe of the Mambilla Plateau.
