= Ate =

Ate or ATE may refer to:

== Organizations ==
- Association of Technical Employees, a trade union, now called the National Association of Broadcast Employees and Technicians
- Swiss Association for Transport and Environment, a sustainable public transport association
- ATEbank, a Greek bank, originally Agrotiki Trapeza Ellados 'Agricultural Bank of Greece'
- ATE, originally Alfred Teves Automobiltechnisches Material und Zubehörteile, a manufacturer of automotive components, now part of Continental AG

== Science and technology ==
- Automated telephone exchange
- Automatic test equipment, any apparatus that performs tests on a device, known as the Device Under Test (DUT) or Unit Under Test (UUT), using automation to quickly perform measurements and evaluate the test results
- Average treatment effect, a measure used to compare treatments in experiments
- 111 Ate, an asteroid
- -ate, a derivative of a specified element or compound; especially a salt or ester of an acid whose name ends in -ic

== Other ==
- Atë, in Greek mythology, the personification of ruin, folly, and delusion (goddess)
- Ate-u-tiv, Tiv architecture
- Ate, jelly (fruit preserves) in Mexican cuisine, e.g. ate de membrillo
- Ate District, Lima, Peru
- After the event insurance, a form of legal expenses insurance
- Ate (EP), a 2024 EP by Stray Kids

== People with the name ==
- Artis Ate (born 1989), Latvian basketball player
- Ate de Jong (born 1953), Dutch film director
- Ate Glow, Filipino comedian

== See also ==
- Eat (irregular verb)
