= BXS =

BXS or bxs may refer to:

- BXS, the IATA code for Borrego Valley Airport, California, United States
- bxs, the ISO 639-3 code for Busam language, Cameroon
