= Atong language (Cameroon) =

Grassfields language of Cameroon

Atong
- Native to: Cameroon
- Native speakers: (4,200 cited 2000)
- Language family: Niger–Congo?: Atlantic–Congo; Benue–Congo; Southern Bantoid; Grassfields; Southwest; Menka–Atong; Atong

Language codes
- ISO 639-3: ato
- Glottolog: aton1242
- ELP: Atong (Cameroon)

Atong (Atoŋ) is a Grassfields language of Cameroon and closely related to the languages Menka [mea] and Manta [myg].
