= Gembu, Nigeria =

Gembu Bommi
- City
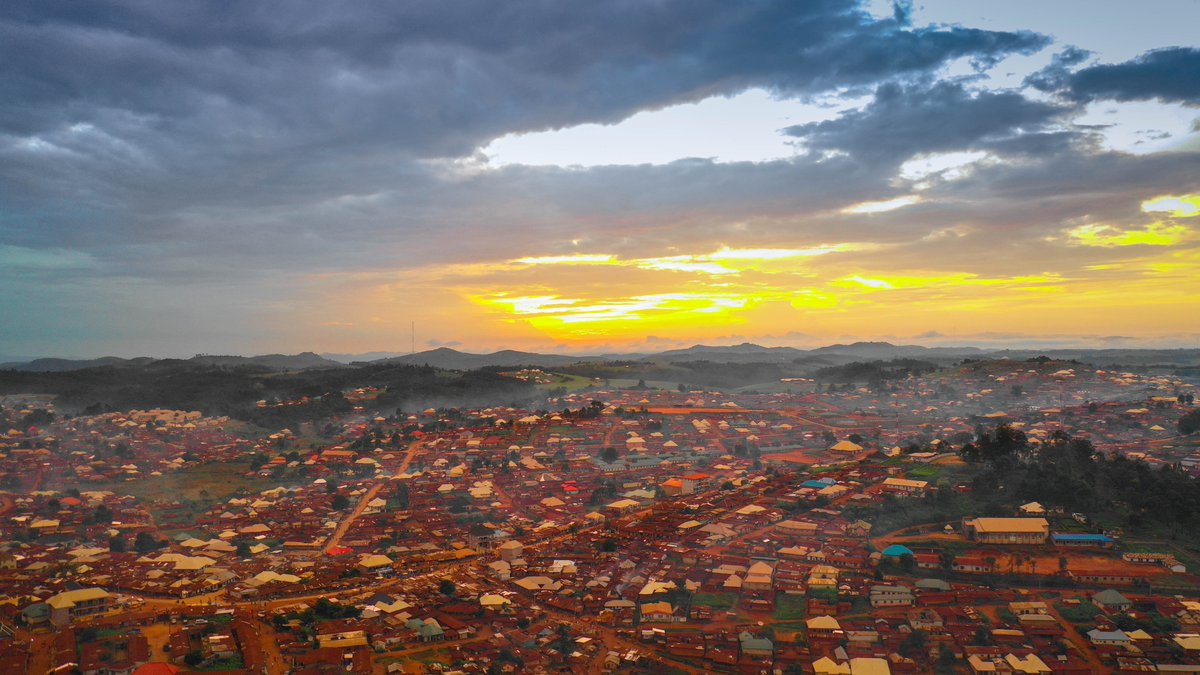
- Gembu aerial view

- Location within Nigeria
- Coordinates: 6°43′N 11°15′E
- Country: Nigeria
- State: Taraba State
- LGA: Sardauna
- Elevation: 1,348 m (4,423 ft)

Population (2015)
  - Total: 19,881
- Time zone: UTC+1 (WAT)

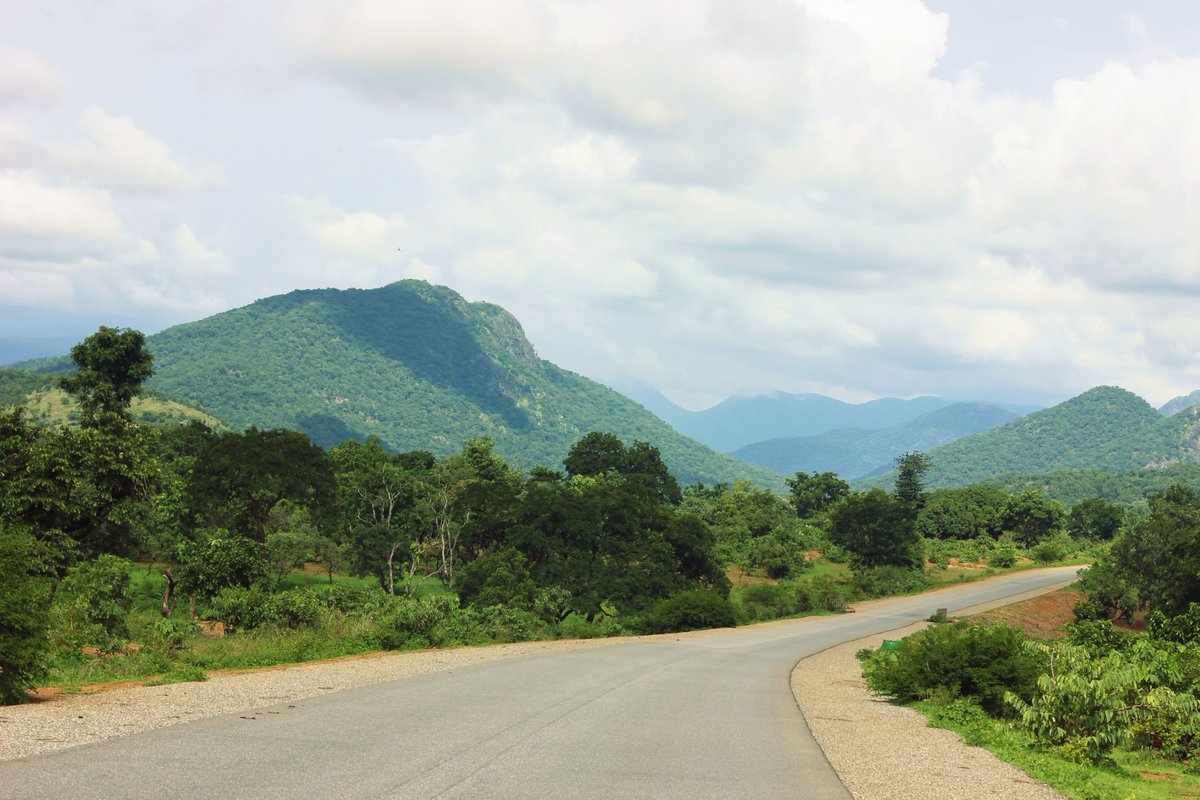
The mountains of Gembu, Taraba State, Nigeria

Gembu is a town on the Mambilla Plateau in Taraba State of Nigeria. It is the headquarters of Sardauna Local Government Area (formerly "Mambilla" LGA) in Taraba State.

Sitting at an average elevation of about 1,348 meters (4,423 ft) above sea level, it is among the highest elevated towns in Nigeria.

== Location ==
Gembu, the administrative headquarters of the Mambilla Plateau, derives its name from a monarch of the ancient Mambilla Town of Bommi. "Gelmvu" was a monarch of the town known as Bommi by the time of the German advent in 1906. The town is found on the Mambilla Plateau, in the south-eastern part of Taraba State, close to the Nigeria-Cameroon border. Bantuists believe that the people inhabiting the Mambilla Region and their neighbours are descendants of the Proto-Bantu ancestors who inhabited the region generally before the Bantu expansion. They constitute the Wide Bantu or Bantoid people who remained after the great split and Bantu expansion across Africa beginning after 2000 BC (thus described as "the Bantu who stayed home").

The following is an excerpt from the book, The Mambilla Region in African History.

By far the most significant event in African pre-history is the ethnogenesis and spread of the Bantu-speaking peoples associated with the Mambilla and adjoining regions of the Nigeria-Cameroon borderlands (the Mambillobantu Region, the Tiv and, subsequently, Cameroon Grassfields) in west-central Africa. The Bantu expansion, which many authorities believe to have begun from this region after 2000 B.C. until about 1500 AD, led to the ramification of over one-third of Africa by the same category of Africans, the Bantu, covering some thirty African countries today. It represents the second of the world's greatest migrations of peoples in history (after the Indo-European expansion). Most of the people existing in the central and southern Nigeria-Cameroon border region, southern Cameroon, central, eastern and southern Africa today are a result of the Bantu expansion from this region or the result of a fusion between the Bantu migrants and Nilo-Saharans and Cushites (as in a few communities in East Africa). One in every three Africans today is Bantoid. The Mambilla Region itself was not totally evacuated and the area is still occupied by the Macro-Bantu-speaking Mambilloid peoples who represent the remnants of that great African expansion.

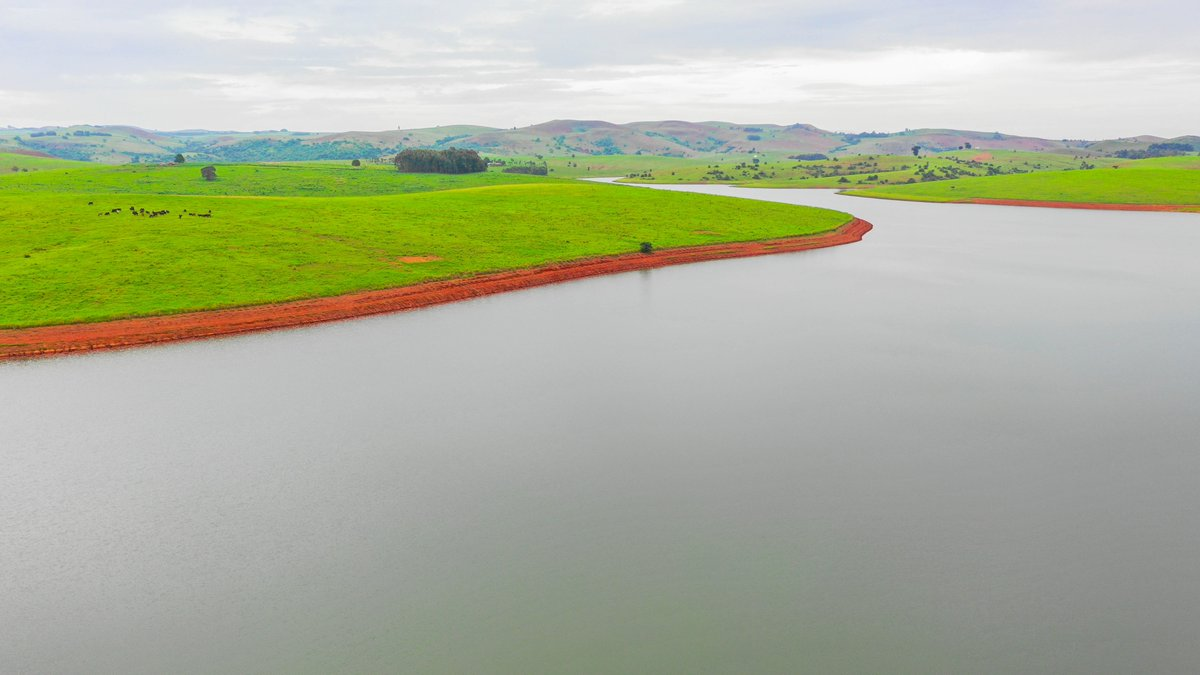
SGEN Lake landscape, at Gwagir Village, Mambilla Plateau, Taraba State, Nigeria.

Bommi Town (Gembu) is about 10 kilometers (6.2 mi) from the Kyiumdua or Donga River valley.

== People ==
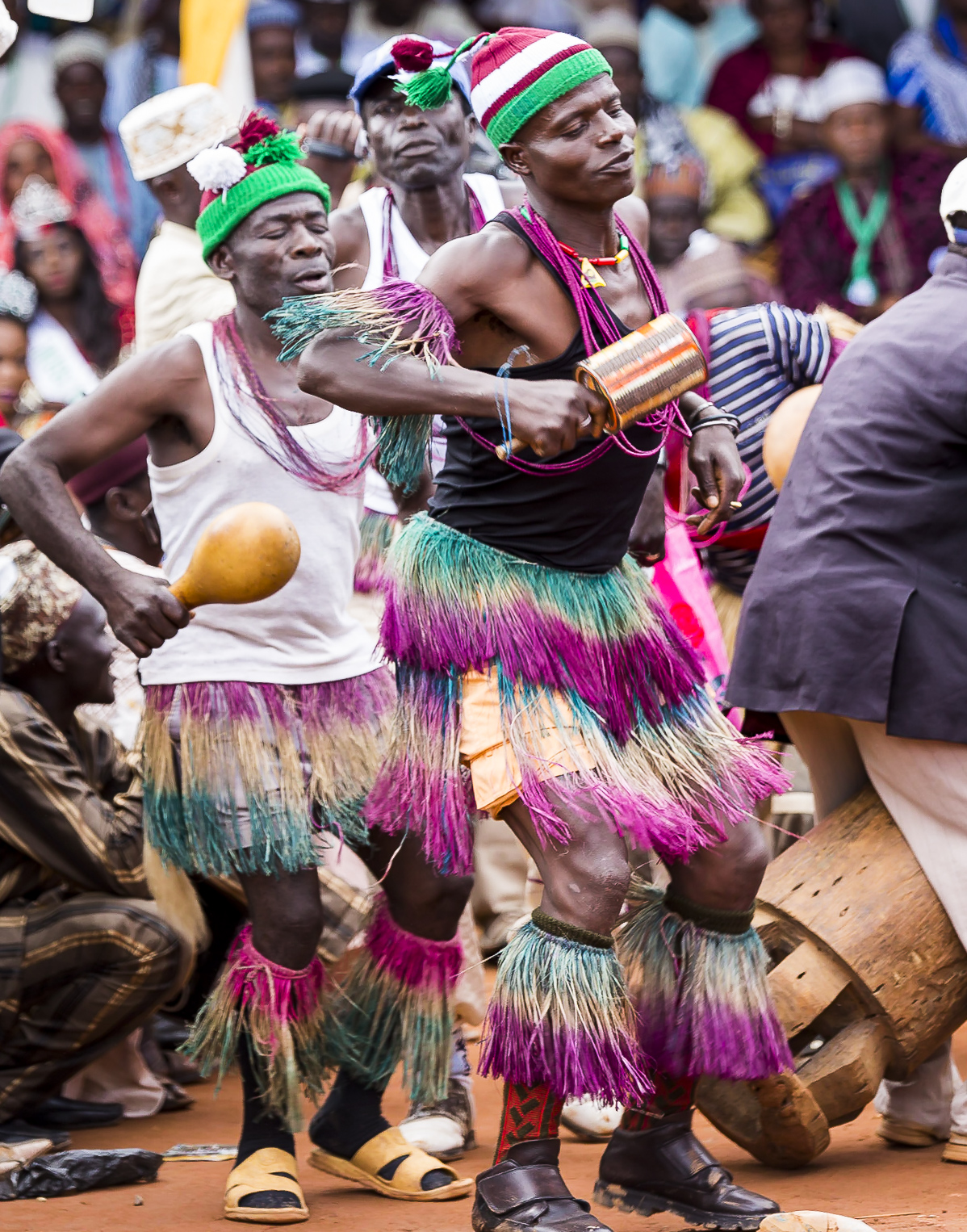
Mambilla dance on September 27, 2016, World Tourism Day

Originally, the only inhabitants of Bommi were the 'Bom-bo' or Tungbo Clan of the Mambilla. They constitute the true Bommi people. The Bommi are the central group of the wide Tungbo which include the Mbubo, Ngebo (from Lenge to as far northwest as Tumbuà, Jimau, Nasò, Ngùng, Yénájù Plain, and Furrmi), Gulkal, Mverip, Kwubo, and their Saan Cradle from which point they all expanded. Splinters from the Tungbo are also to be found in Liimila (Mbamnga), Mvurr (Warwar), Tem, Niggi, and Ngunochin. Today, Bommi Town (Gembu), being the headquarters of a Local Government Area, has attracted a population diverse in ethnic makeup, which has resulted in the town taking a cosmopolitan shape. People coming from different parts of Nigeria have made the town their home. Cameroonian immigrants can also be found in the town. The local government area, known as "Mambilla" throughout its ancient and contemporary history, was renamed "Sardauna" by the then Col. Jega (related to the "Sardauna of Sokoto" Ahmadu Bello), when he came as Military Governor of former Gongola State in 1976. This misnomer was quashed in the Second Republic (1979-1983) and the ancient and original name of "Mambilla" was restored. However, on his second coming in 1984, Jega arbitrarily re-imposed the name "Sardauna", a chieftaincy title, on this Local Government Area (previously successively known as "Mamberre" Highlands in ancient times, "Mambilla Landschaft" and "Mambilla Gebirge" in German times, and "Mambilla Area", "Mambilla District", "Mambilla-Gashaka Native Authority", "Mambilla Division" and "Mambilla Local Authority" in British and post-British times). Jega imposed the misnomer of "Sardauna" notwithstanding that it was unhistorical and non-autochthonous. Mubi, Ganye, Toungo, Michika and all other areas formerly known as "Sardauna Province" have since resumed the use of their former, proper and autochthonous names to avoid a distortion of their history and identity.

The Mambila people make up the largest single ethnic group in the town, followed by the Yamba Group (Locally Known as Kaka), and then the Hausa–Fulanis, the main cattle rearers? of the plateau. The Mambilla people, the denizens of this Plateau, were the only inhabitants of the town until colonial rule set in. They are thought to have been in this region for the past five millennia. On the other hand, the first Kaka (Yamba) probably arrived the Plateau in "early German times" but remained unnoticed until 1928, while the first isolated grazing visits by the Fulani nomads were in the late 1920s. According to Percival, "No Fulani settled on the Mambilla Plateau until after the British occupation". It is estimated that 85% of the Mambilla Plateau is composed of the Mambilla Group and these number over 500,000 worldwide. There are also several minor groups, mainly businessmen and women from other parts of Nigeria and Cameroon, who can be found doing business in the Mambilla Plateau, Igbos, Hausas, Bansos, and Kambus.

== Accessibility ==
Although in the past, roads leading to Bommi Town (Gembu) on the Mambilla Plateau were poorly maintained and traveling to the town from other parts of Nigeria was difficult, the transport problems improved radically with the construction of the Mambilla Highway linking the plateau to the lowlands west and north of it. The road works begun by the Taraba State Government in 2012 have added a greater prospect of ease of communication with the rest of Nigeria.
