= Yakubu Ochefu =

Nigerian academic

Professor Yakubu Aboki Ochefu, son to late Colonel Anthony Ochefu, is the Secretary to the Committee of Vice Chancellors of Nigerian Universities. He is a professor of African Economic History and Development Studies with the Benue State University since 2003. He is a former Deputy Vice-Chancellor at the Benue State University, former Vice Chancellor of Kwararafa University, Taraba State, Nigeria and the President of the University of Calabar Alumni Association. In December 2022, he was elected chairman, Conference of Alumni Associations of Nigerian Universities. His academic publications are on the open educational resources platforms including Academia.edu and he co-edited Studies in the History of Central Nigeria Area / with Aliyu A. Idrees in 2002.
