= Roy Clive Abraham =

African language scholar (1890–1963)

Roy Clive Abraham (16 December 1890, Melbourne, Australia – 22 June 1963, Hendon, London) was a key figure in African language scholarship during the twentieth century. He worked for over thirty years on a wide range of disparate languages.

== Education ==
- University College School
- Clifton College, Bristol
- Various establishments in Germany

From 1923 to 1924 he was at Balliol College, Oxford. He received a first-class honours degree in Arabic and Persian; he asked to be examined in Ethiopic, but no examiner was available. He took a certificate in anthropology from University College, London in 1927, and a diploma in (classical) Arabic from the School of Oriental Studies in 1930.

== Career ==
He was granted a temporary commission as a Second Lieutenant in the Infantry (he was assigned to the East Surrey Regiment) on 22 January 1915. He relinquished his commission on appointment to a cadetship at the Royal Military College, Sandhurst on 19 January 1916. He was commissioned a Second Lieutenant on the Unattached List for the Indian Army on 16 August 1916. He was attached to the 1st battalion, 109th Infantry on 10 November 1916. By late 1918 he was acting as Assistant Censor, Rangoon. He was appointed an Assistant Embarkation Staff Officer on 1 November 1919. He was promoted Captain 20 August 1919 and retired on 5 October 1922.

From 1925 to 1944, he worked for the administrative service of the northern provinces of Nigeria. He researched the local languages, and assisted George Percival Bargery to compile the latter's monumental and authoritative Hausa-English Dictionary, published in 1934. In his Principles of Hausa (1934), Abraham simplified Bargery's six-tone system to the correct three-tone system for Hausa.

In this period, he also published The Grammar of Tiv (1933) and The Principles of Idoma (1935), the first detailed linguistic description of an eastern Kwa language. Abraham's grammars and dictionaries represented major descriptive and analytical contributions to the study of African languages. In 1941–42, he taught Hausa to soldiers in the Royal West African frontier force. Later in World War II, he served in Ethiopia, teaching Amharic and Somali; he was also based in Kenya, South Africa, France, and Italy, and with the British military mission in Moscow, being promoted to major.

In 1945, Abraham was awarded a Leverhulme research fellowship to research the languages of Ethiopia and Eritrea (including Amharic and Ge'ez). In 1946 he failed to succeed Bargery as lecturer in Hausa at the School of Oriental and African Studies. However, in 1948 he was appointed to a new lectureship in Amharic; he also taught Tigrinya and began research into Berber, Oromo, and Somali. His Dictionary of Hausa was published in 1949 and The Principles of Somali in 1951. He retired in 1951. In 1952, Abraham embarked on a study of Yoruba. His Dictionary of Modern Yoruba appeared in 1958. His linguistic work was based on fieldwork conducted amongst a number of groups of people: Hausa, Tiv, Idoma, Oromo, Somalis, Yoruba, and Berbers.

A commemorative volume in honour of his outstanding contribution to the understanding of African languages was published in 1992.

== Archives ==
- The archive of Roy Clive Abraham is held at the School of Oriental and African Studies, London. http://www.soas.ac.uk/library/archives/
