= Dorathy Nyagh =

Nigerian handball player

Dorathy Nyagh is a female Nigerian professional handball player and the captain of Benue Queens and one of the players that was shortlisted to represent Nigeria at the 2021 African Women's Handball Championship.

== History ==
Dorathy started playing handball when she was in Junior Secondary School, in 2005 at the Queen of the Rosary Secondary School Gboko.

After graduation from secondary school, she proceeded to Benue State University in 2009 where she studied English and became the captain of the institution. She is the only girl out of four children, and her parents supported her passion for sport and gave her all the support to be a success at it. Dorathy's father is also a sportsman. He is a lecturer at the College of Education in Katsina- Ala. where he teaches in the department of human kinetics.

== Career ==
Dorathy had started playing and representing her school since she was in secondary school events during all Secondary School Games. In July 2018, after playing at the first edition of the Prudent Energy Handball League, she played for Civil Defender Babes. In 2020, she and her team played at the Prudent Energy Handball League. She played for All Africa Games qualifiers. After she and her team qualified, they were invited to the games proper in Morocco, where she played in almost all the matches. In 2021, she led the Nigeria women's national handball team at the African Women's Handball Championship that took place in Yaoundé, Cameroon.
