= Balo language =

Grassfields language of Cameroon

Balo
- Native to: Cameroon
- Native speakers: (2,200 cited 2000)
- Language family: Niger–Congo?: Atlantic–Congo; Benue–Congo; Southern Bantoid; Grassfields; Southwest; Balo
- Dialects: Alunfa

Language codes
- ISO 639-3: bqo
- Glottolog: balo1264

Balo is a Grassfields language of Cameroon. Alunfa is distinct and perhaps should be considered a different language.

Balo and Alunfa are poorly documented and for a time had been considered Tivoid languages.
