= Tor Iorapuu =

Nigerian Professor and VC

Joe Tor Iorapuu
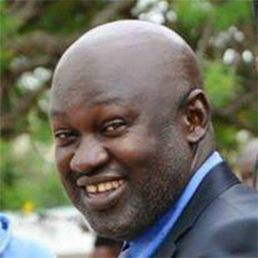
- Iorapuu in 2018

Vice-Chancellor of Benue State University
- Incumbent
- Assumed office 2020
- Preceded by: Msugh Moses Kembe

Personal details
- Born: Joseph Tor Iorapuu
- Education: University of Jos
- Profession: Academic

Joe Tor Iorapuu is a Nigerian professor and the Vice-Chancellor of Benue State University. He was appointed in 2021 following the end of tenure of his predecessor, Msugh Kembe.

== Career ==
Iorapuu was the Head of Department, Theatre and Film Arts at the University of Jos for two tenure. He was also the Dean of Faculty of Art at the University for additional two tenure before he was appointed the Vice-Chancellor of Benue State University by the Governor of Benue State, Samuel Ortom in 2020 after he was selected among the best three candidate by the governing council of the school.
