= 2021 Nasarawa massacre =

2021 attack by gunmen in Nasarawa, Nigeria

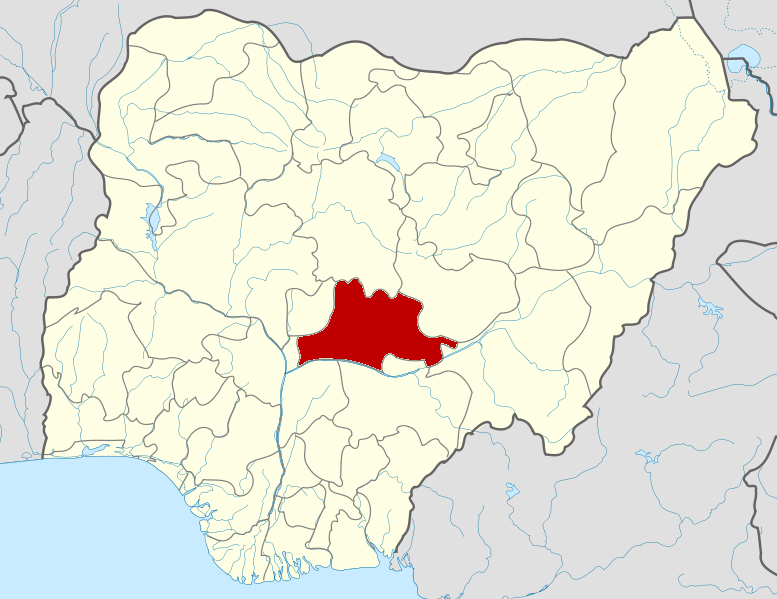
- Nasarawa, the state in which the attack occurred
- Location: Nasarawa, Nigeria
- Date: December 20, 2021; 4 years ago
- Attack type: Mass shooting, mass murder, massacre
- Weapon: Guns
- Deaths: Estimated: 50
- Perpetrator: Fulani herdsmen

The 2021 Nasarawa massacre was an attack by Fulani herdsmen gunmen on Tiv civilians that occurred on 20 December 2021, in the state of Nasarawa, Nigeria. The herdsmen killed approximately 52 people according to eyewitnesses in 12 different villages, although the death toll was initially put at least 20 by the Tiv Development Association.

Prior to the attack, the conflict had been happening for decades due to overgrazing and farming in what they deemed communal areas. Over time, it had acquired religious undertones with the Fulani being Muslim and the Tivs' mostly Christian.

== Background ==
Although various skirmishes had happened previously, a full-on war would not escalate between the two until the 21st-century. Prior to that, the Fulani had most lived in West Africa living a nomadic lifestyle. However, as desertification and droughts came in the 1970s, they moved south in favor of richer lands with vast farmland to raise livestock.

== Aftermath ==
President Muhammadu Buhari called the murders "senseless and barbaric", and expressed his condolences to the families of the deceased.
