= Cecilia Omaile Ojabo =

Nigerian physician and civil servant

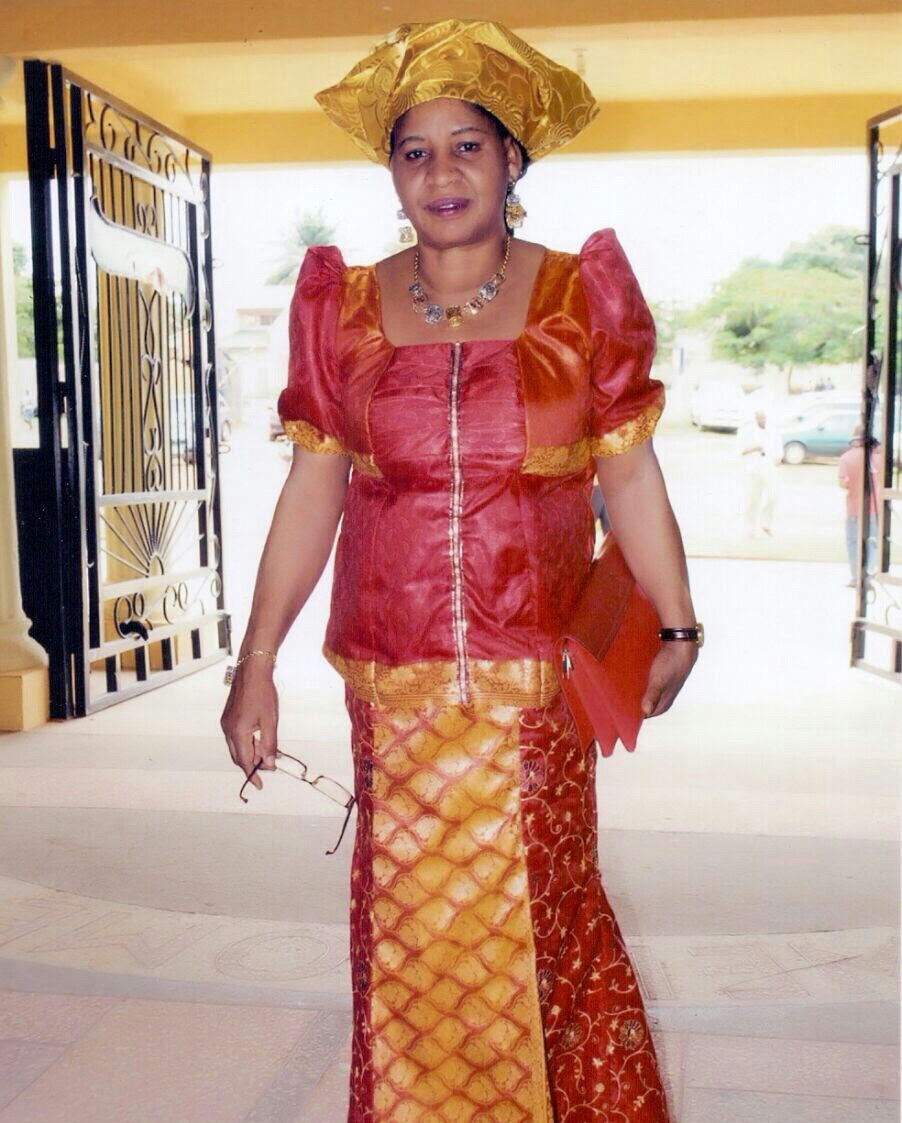
- Education: Saint Francis Primary School, Otukpo, Nigeria. Government Girls Secondary School, Shendam, Nigeria. University of Benin
- Occupation: Physician Civil Servant Politician

Cecilia Omaile Ojabo (born in 1960) is the former Commissioner of Health and Human Services in Benue State, Nigeria. She was sworn in by Governor Samuel Ortom in 2015. She is also an associate professor of Ophthalmology at the Benue State University Teaching Hospital (BSUTH). As a Commissioner, she worked towards improving healthcare in rural areas of Benue State. She also worked towards making hospitals more functional; increasing number of medical staff; and getting rid of polio infection and cholera outbreaks in the entire state.

== Early life and career ==
She attended Saint Francis Primary School, Otukpo, Nigeria, from 1965 to 1971, and proceeded to the Government Girls Secondary School, Shendam, Nigeria, where she graduated with a West African School Certificate in 1976. She got her medical degree from the University of Benin in 1985. She has worked in a number of hospitals in Nigeria and Scotland.

She is a Fellow of the West African College of Surgeons.

She was the Commissioner of Health and Human Services in Benue State from 2015 to 2018.
