= Stanley Okoro (actor) =

Nigerian filmmaker and model (1992–2021)

- Born: 10 October 1992
- Died: 11 August 2021 (aged 28)
- Education: Benue State University
- Occupations: Film actor, content creator, producer

Stanley Okoro (10 October 1992 – 11 August 2021) was a Nigerian actor, digital marketer, and content creator. He acted as a comedian in the films.

== Career ==
After graduating from Benue State University, he pursued his career as an actor.

== Filmography ==
- The Briefcase
- Marriage War
- Royal Tigress
- Behind the Mask
- My Calabar Wife
- Order of the Dragon
- Pocket Book
- Abada na South

== Death ==
He died on 11 August 2021, at the age of 28 as a result of a suspected food poisoning. Prior to his death, he was reportedly having breakfast at a hotel in Maryland area of Enugu State after completing a film shoot.
