= Southwest Grassfields languages =

Branch of the Grassfields languages

Southwest Grassfields
- Western Momo
- Geographic distribution: Cameroon
- Linguistic classification: Niger–Congo?: Atlantic–Congo; Benue–Congo; Southern Bantoid; Grassfields; Southwest Grassfields

Language codes
- Glottolog: sout3181

The Southwest Grassfields, traditionally called Western Momo when considered part of the Momo group or when Momo is included in Grassfields, are a small branch of the Southern Bantoid languages spoken in the Western grassfields of Cameroon.

The languages are Manta (Tanka, Batakpa), Balo (Alunfa), Osatu, Busam, Menka–Atoŋ.

Several of these have been classified as Tivoid, a position reflected in Ethnologue.

== Classification ==
Blench (2010) recognises five coordinate subgroups within Southwest Grassfields.

Southwest Grassfields

- Busam
- Menka, Atong
- Tanka, Bantakpa, Manta
- Osatu
- Alunfa, Balo
