= Osatu language =

Grassfields language spoken in Cameroon

Osatu
- Native to: Cameroon
- Native speakers: 400 (2002)
- Language family: Niger–Congo?: Atlantic–Congo; Benue–Congo; Southern Bantoid; Grassfields; Southwest; Osatu

Language codes
- ISO 639-3: ost
- Glottolog: osat1238

Osatu (Ihatum) is a Grassfields language of Cameroon.

Osatu is poorly documented and for a time had been considered a Tivoid language.
