= Iyive language =

Bantoid language spoken in West Africa

Iyive
- Uive
- Yiive
- Native to: Cameroon, Nigeria
- Region: Manyu in Cameroon, Benue State in Nigeria
- Ethnicity: Ndir
- Native speakers: (2,000 cited 1996)
- Language family: Niger–Congo: Atlantic–Congo; Volta-Congo; Benue-Congo; Bantoid; Southern Bantoid; Tivoid; Central Tivoid A; Tiv-Evand; Tiv-Iyive-Otanga; Iyive

Language codes
- ISO 639-3: uiv Iyive
- Glottolog: iyiv1238 Iyive
- ELP: Iyive

Iyive, also referred to as Uive, Yiive, Ndir, Asumbo (Note: Blench 2020 lists Uive as an alternate spelling, Yiive as the native name, Ndir as the ethnicity of the language's speakers, and Asumbo as a Cameroonian name for the language) is a severely endangered Bantoid language spoken in Nigeria and Cameroon. The ethnic group defined by use of this language is the Ndir.

== General information ==
Iyive is an indigenous Tivoid language of Cameroon. It is spoken in the Southwest Region in the Manyu division, northeast of Akwaya town on the Nigeria border, Yive village. Although they live in Cameroon, the majority of Iyive's linguistic population had been forced to relocate to Nigeria due to a tribal conflict; as of 2012, the Cameroonian government was helping the speakers return to Manyu.

Estimates of the number of Iyive speakers are generally around 2,000, but its level of language endangerment is somewhat unsettled. UNESCO's Atlas of the World's Languages in Danger lists Iyive as "severely endangered" in the 2010 edition. This corresponds to a language that is only used by the older generations, and rarely, if ever spoken to children. SIL International, on the other hand, lists the language as "vigorous". Guthrie's 1967 book classified it as moribund.

== Phonology ==
=== Consonants ===
Consonant phonemes (from Foster 2012)
	Bilabial		Labio- dental		Alveolar		Post- alveolar		Palatal	Velar		Glottal
Plosive	p	b			t	d				k	ɡ	
Double plosive	kp	gb										
Affricate					ts	dz	tʃ	dʒ				
Fricative			f	v	s		ʃ					h
Nasal		m				n			ɲ		ŋ	
Approximant									j		w	
Lateral approximant						l						

In addition, each of the voiced plosives can be pre-nasalized: /ᵐb/, /ⁿd/, and /ᵑɡ/. Some Iyive affricates/fricatives can also be prenasalized: /ⁿd/, /ⁿdz/, and /ⁿdʒ/. Labialization and palatalization also occur, sometimes contrastively.

=== Vowels ===
There are seven vowel phonemes in Iyive, with four height values and three backness values.

Vowel phonemes (from Foster 2012)
	Front	Central	Back
Close	i		u
Close-mid			o
Open-mid	ɛ	ə	ɔ
Open		a	

Length is not distinctive on the vowels. Long vowels exist in situations where there is a contour tone on the vowel; all other vowels are short.

=== Tone ===
Iyive has a four-way contour tone system: high, low, falling, and rising. Tone can be contrastive for lexical and morphosyntactic features. For example, ìhɔ́ (knife) and íhɔ́ (day) are a minimal pair that differ only on the first syllable's tone. Tone can also be used to differentiate singular and plural forms, and as a question marker.

=== Phonotactics ===
Iyive has four phonotactically valid syllable templates: V, CV, CVC, and CCV. VC is also attested, but may result from phonological processes rather than an underlying VC structure.

=== Phonological processes ===
Iyive has vowel harmony, which Blench classifies as ATR harmony. This is a feature it shares with its fellow Tivoid languages Ugare (Mesaka) and Esimbi.

The vowel harmony process groups the Iyive vowels into two classes:

- /a/, /ə/, /ɔ/
- /u/, /i/, /ɛ/, /o/

Harmony generally spreads from the root to prefixes, right-to-left. Suffixes or particles that occur after the root do not appear to have harmony.

== Morphology ==
Iyive is one of the few Niger-Congo languages to use both prefixes and suffixes, a feature shared with some other Tivoid languages. Its pluralization morphology is particularly complex; Iyive plurals can be marked at least six different morphological processes:

- prefix alternation
- prefix addition
- affix copying
- affix deletion (kә́válә́k → ávál; bamboo → bamboos)
- tonal alternation (ìtʃɛ́ → ítʃɛ́; hair → hairs)
- morphophonemic consonant alternation (kímómúnùkú → vímómúv; bell → bells)

== Writing system ==
Iyive is written using Latin script.

== See also ==
- Endangered language
- Language death
- Tivoid languages
- Cameroon
