= Yima Sen =

Nigerian intellectual and political activist (1951–2020)

John Yima Sen
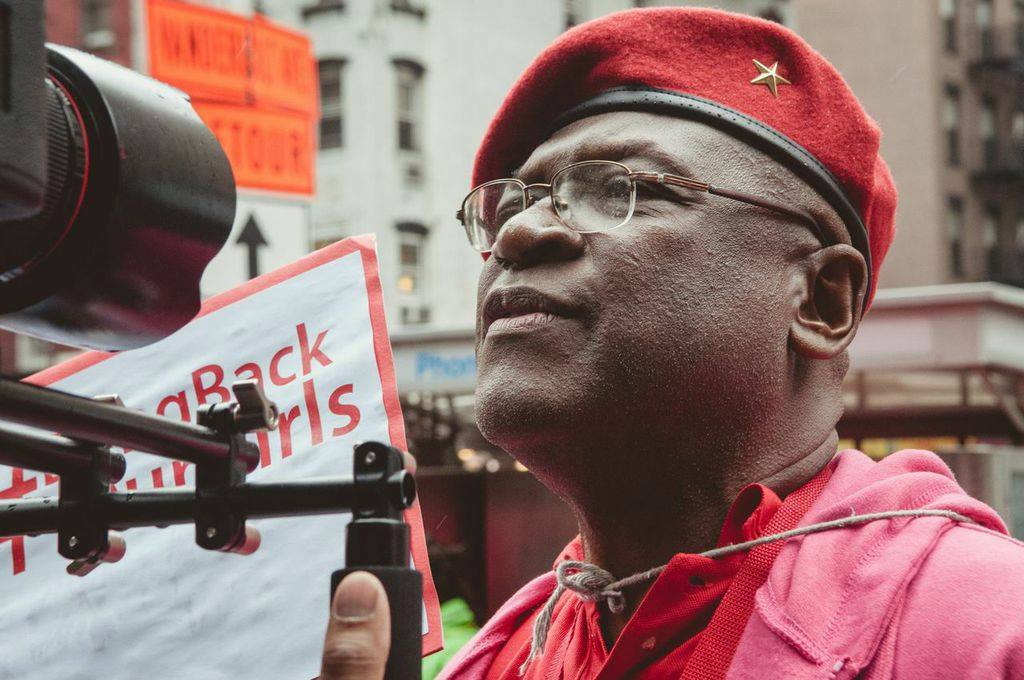
- Yima Sen, during the Bring Back Our Girls rally in Washington DC, 2014
- Born: February 12, 1951; Benue State, Nigeria
- Died: October 6, 2020 (aged 69)
- Education: University of Lagos
- Occupations: Academic; socio-political activist
- Known for: Campaign for Democracy, Northern Elders Forum, Bring Back Our Girls
- Children: 3

John Yima Sen, OON (12 February 1951 – 6 October 2020) was a Tiv Nigerian intellectual and political activist. He was deeply involved in the political movements that challenged the Ibrahim Badamasi Babangida military dictatorship. He was the Secretary General of Campaign for Democracy (CD) and an active member of the Democratic Alternative that forced General Babangida out of power after his unpopular annulment of the 12 June 1993 Nigerian presidential election. He was also a member of the Olusola Saraki led Northern Union and a frontline participant of the Bring Back Our Girls campaign.

During the Second Nigerian Republic, he served as communications assistant to Senate President, Chuba Okadigbo. He later became Special Adviser on Political Affairs to President Shehu Shagari and also served as Director of Information in the Aper Aku administration.

In the Fourth Nigerian Republic, he was Special Adviser on Research, policy and Documentation to vice president, Atiku Abubakar.

He also served as Secretary-General of the Middle Belt Forum and was Director-General of Northern Elders Forum. He was a notable figure in the agitation for minority rights who sought the advancement of the communities in the Middle Belt Region and was involved in many organizations aimed at the resolution of issues in a bid to engender and promote peaceful co-existence.

However, while reacting to issues in the Nigerian polity in 2018, such as President Muhammadu Buhari's recurring medical leave, the executive-legislature faceoff and the power tussle in his home state, Benue, he is quoted to have said, "the alarm has been sounded that Nigeria cannot make it without a revolutionary exit. The country has attained a degree of rot and decay that cannot be managed without a revolutionary exit."

He studied Mass Communication at the University of Lagos, University of California, Los Angeles, USA, and the University of Amsterdam in the Netherlands. In his practice of mass communication, he once served as information Adviser at the United Nations Development Programme in Nairobi, Kenya and was a coordinating consultant at the International Foundation for Education and Self Help. He was a senior academic of Mass Communications at the Baze University in Abuja.

On 12 June 2025, Yima received the national honour of Officer of the Order of the Niger.
