= Buru–Angwe language =

Southern Bantoid language of Nigeria

Buru–Angwe
- Native to: Nigeria
- Region: Sardauna LGA, Taraba State
- Native speakers: (undated figure of 1,000 speakers of Buru; potentially substantially more of Angwe)
- Language family: Niger–Congo?: Atlantic–Congo; Volta-Congo; Benue–Congo; Bantoid; Southern Bantoid; Buru–Angwe

Language codes
- ISO 639-3: bqw
- Glottolog: buru1299

Buru and Angwe constitute a potentially rather divergent Southern Bantoid language spoken in Sardauna LGA, Taraba State of Nigeria.

Buru is the language of a village near where Batu is spoken, east of Baissa. Angwe had previously been assumed to be Batu, a Tivoid language, but turns out to be the same language as Buru. There are resemblances to Tivoid, though apart from sharing some lexical items with Northwest Tivoid, presumably due to contact, there is little evidence to classify it. It is treated as an isolate within Bantoid by Blench (2016).
