= Akiga Sai =

Akiga Sai (1898–1959) was an early Nigerian autobiographer and historian, known for his History of the Tiv.

Sai's Tiv language manuscript was edited and translated into English by Rupert East, and first published in 1939. In 2015 a full edition was published and several other articles published about Sai (by Fardon, Pine and Martin Luter Akiga among others).

Fardon (2015: 572), citing the Tiv historian Atah Pine accords Akiga Sai the following Tiv "firsts": "the first Tiv man to be baptized as a Christian, the first Tiv man to read and write, the first Tiv man to write a letter, first Tiv parliamentarian, first Tiv newspaper editor, and first Tiv man to write a book."

In Sklar's book on Nigerian political parties, Sai is listed on as a Benue state member of the National People's Congress for 1958.
