= Benue State University =

Public university in Makurdi, Nigeria

Coordinates: 7.7265°N 8.5563°E

Rev. Fr. Moses Orshio Adasu University, Makurdi
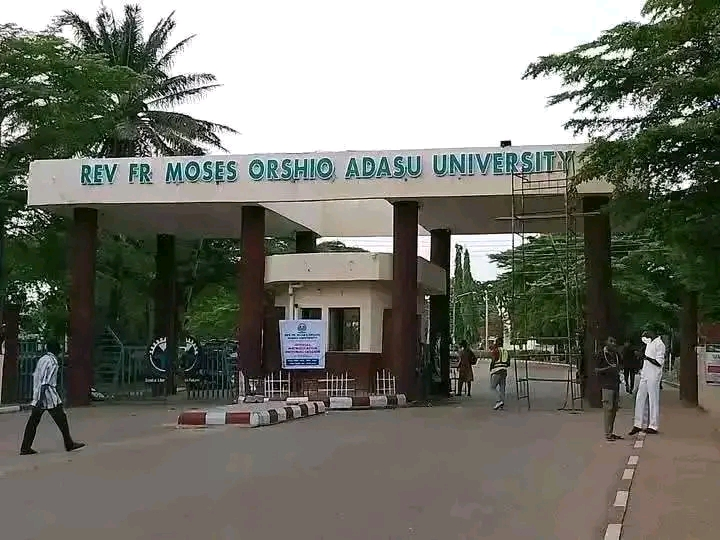
- Other name: MOAUM
- Former name: Benue State University (1992–2025)
- Motto: Latin: Scientia Liberatio Populorum
- Motto in English: "Knowledge for the Liberation of the People"
- Type: Public
- Established: 1992
- Accreditation: National Universities Commission
- Affiliations: Benue State University Teaching Hospital
- Vice-Chancellor: Timothy Tersser Alabar
- Total staff: 1,963
- Students: 21,628 (2025)
- Location: Makurdi, Benue, Nigeria
- Campus: Urban
- Colours: Red
- Website: www.bsum.edu.ng

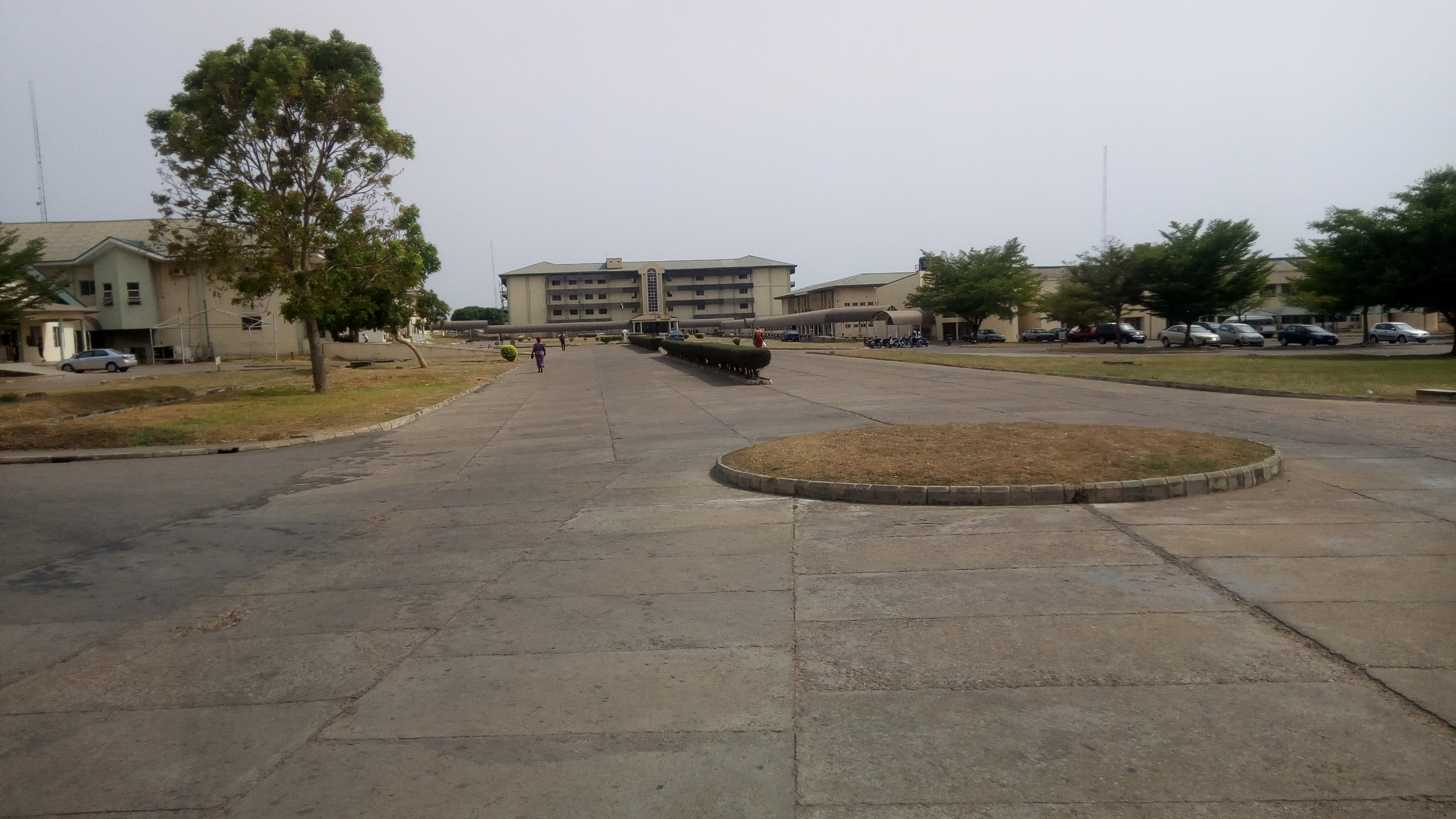
Entrance view of Benue State University Teaching Hospital

Rev. Fr. Moses Orshio Adasu University, Makurdi (MOAUM) is a state-owned university in Makurdi, Benue State, Nigeria. It was established as Benue State University in 1992 and was renamed Rev. Fr. Moses Orshio Adasu University, Makurdi in 2025.

The university offers undergraduate and postgraduate programs with a catalogue of over 58 graduate programs across 9 colleges/faculties. The university is accredited by the National Universities Commission.

== History ==
Benue State University was founded in Makurdi, Benue State in 1992 by the state government to augment the specialized academic offerings of the University of Agriculture, Makurdi. In 1991, the state government had formed a thirteen-member steering committee to plan for and obtain approval for the university. The university began offering classes for the 1992/1993 school year in four colleges: Arts, Education, Sciences, and Social Science. It had 306 students and 149 educational staff members.

Its founding vice chancellor was Charles Gbilekaa Vajime, who remained in the position until 2000. He was replaced by David I. Ker from 3 August 2000 to 3 November 2005, followed by Akase P. Sorkaa from 3 November 2005 to 3 November 2010. The university's first female vice-chancellor was Charity Angya, who served from 3 November 2010 until 2 November 2015. She was replaced by Msugh Moses Kembe on 3 November 2015, who was replaced by Tor Iorapuu on 3 November 2020.

The university was renamed Rev. Fr. Moses Orshio Adasu University, Makurdi by the Alia Hyacinth administration in 2025. Moses Adasu was a former Governor of Benue State and Catholic priest. That year, the university had 21,628 students.

On 1 June 2026, the university's academic staff went on strike.

== Academics ==
=== Programs ===
The university offers undergraduate and postgraduate programs with a catalogue of over 58 graduate programs across 9 colleges/faculties.

==== College Faculties ====
- Arts
- College of Health Science
- Education
- Environmental Sciences
- Law
- Social Science
- Science
- Management Science

===== Faculty of Administration =====
- Accountancy/Accounting
- Public Administration

==== Faculty of Arts And Humanities ====
- English Language
- French
- History
- Linguistics
- Philosophy
- Religious Studies
- Theatre Arts

==== Faculty of Education ====
- Business Education
- Education & Computer Science
- Education & Mathematics
- Education & Physics
- Education And Biology
- Education And Chemistry
- Education And Chemistry
- Education And Chemistry
- Education And English Language
- Education And Integrated Science
- Educational Management
- Educational Technology
- Guidance & counselling
- Home Economics And Education
- Physical And Health Education
- Pre-Primary And Primary Education
- Vocational And Technical Education

==== Faculty of Engineering, Technology, and Environment ====
- Business Management
- Urban And Regional Planning

==== Faculty of Law and Legal Studies ====
- Civil Law
- Law

Faculty of Medicine, Pharmacy, and Health Sciences

- Anatomy
- Human Physiology
- Medicine And Surgery

==== Faculty of Sciences ====
- Biological Science(s)
- Chemistry
- Computer Science
- Environmental Management And Toxicology
- Library And Information Science
- Industrial Chemistry
- Mathematics
- Microbiology
- Physics
- Plant Science And Biotechnology
- Statistics
- Zoology

Faculty of Social Sciences

- Economics
- Geography
- Mass Communication
- Political Science
- Psychology
- Sociology

=== Faculty and staff ===
In 2025, the university had a student to faculty ratio of 1 to 30. Its total staff was 1,963. Timothy Tersser Alabar became the university's vice chacellor in February 2026.

=== Accreditation ===
The university is accredited by the National Universities Commission.

=== Library ===
The university's library complex, University Library and Information Services (ULIS) comprises units in the College of Health Sciences and the faculties of Arts, Education, Environmental Sciences, Law, Science, and Social Sciences. Other unit libraries serve the departments of Chemistry and Mass Communications. This library system commenced operation from makeshift quarters at the inception of BSU in 1992. A new Central Library Complex, constructed with a grant from TETFund and designed to house 45,000 books and 3,000 students, was commissioned in August 2016.

Branch Libraries

- Virtual Library
- College of Health Sciences Library
- Faculty of Social Science
- Faculty of Arts Library
- Faculty of Education Library
- Department of Chemistry Library
- Department of Mathematics and Computer Science Library
- Department of Mass Communications Library
- Faculty of Environmental Sciences Library
- Faculty of Law Library
- Department of Library and Information Science Library
- Faculty of Management Sciences Library
- Faculty of Science Library

== Affiliated colleges ==
- College of Education, Oju

== Student life ==
In 2015, the university's Department of Mass Communication started a radio station, BSU FM on 89.9 MHz.

== Athletics ==
Athletic activities are handled by the Sports Unit. The university participates in the Nigerian University Games Association and has won silver and bronze medals at NUGA's Sports Fiesta.

Facilities include a football field, basketball court, badminton court, volleyball court, and two tennis courts.

=== Awards ===
- Silver Medal, Football (2001 NUGA Sports Fiesta)
- Silver Medal, Judo (2001 NUGA Sports Fiesta)
- Bronze Medal, Taekwondo (2001 NUGA Sports Fiesta)

== Notable people ==
=== Notable alumni ===
- Gbenro Ajibade, actor and model
- Sueddie Agema, poet
- Enenche Akogwu, journalist and cameraman
- Jeta Amata, filmmaker
- Gbenro Ajibade, actor
- Muhammed S. Audu, academic
- John Dyegh, Nigerian House of Representatives
- Elizabeth Ehi Jones, businesswoman
- Dorathy Nyagh, handball player
- Stanley Okoro, actor
- Samuel Ortom, Governor of Benue State and Federal Minister of Industry, Trade and Investment Nigeria
- Terseer Ugbor, Nigerian House of Representatives
- Mark Bako Useni, Taraba House of Assembly Speaker

=== Notable faculty and staff ===
- Charity Angya
- James Ayatse
- Eno James Ibanga
- Tor Iorapuu
- Msugh Moses Kembe
- Yakubu Ochefu
- Lucy Jumeyi Ogbadu
- Cecilia Omaile Ojabo

== See also ==
- List of universities in Nigeria
