= Ambrose Feese =

Ambrose Asula Feese
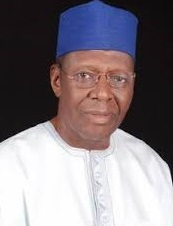
- Born: 7 December 1944 (age 81); Tsar, Mbaduku, Benue State, Nigeria
- Occupations: banker; chartered accountant; civil servant
- Spouse: Nguyan Feese
- Children: 4

Asula Ambrose Feese (born 7 December 1944) known as Ambrose Feese, is a chartered accountant, public servant, administrator and banker. He was the former minister of works and housing in the Nigerian government between 1998 and 1999.

== Early life ==
Ambrose was born on December 7, 1944, at Tsar Mbaduku, Vandeikya local government area of Benue state.

== Personal life ==
In 1977, Feese married Nguyan Shaku, with whom he has four children. One of their daughters is a survivor of the tragic terrorist attack on the United Nations building in Abuja, which occurred on August 26, 2011.

== Career ==
In 1989, Feese joined the International Committee on Nigeria Limited in Lagos. This necessitated another relocation from Kano, as he accepted the role of managing director and chief executive officer. He held this job until 1995. In 1996, he relocated to the newly established Nigerian capital of Abuja to take on the role of executive chairman at NSF Developments Limited. He stayed for two years before being appointed by the Nigerian government a ministerial job.

Following his departure from the government, he established himself as the managing consultant at Dynamic Consulting Limited. Additionally, he has held the position of non-executive director at First Bank of Nigeria, NAL Bank Plc, Universal Trust Bank Plc.

== Membership and associations ==
He was a Fellow at the Institute of Chartered Accountants of Nigeria since 1975. In 1991, he became a Fellow with the Chartered and Certified Accountants organization in the United Kingdom.

Feese has been a member of the Institute of Directors since 1991. He has contributed to the Public Accounts Committee in Benue State, overseeing financial accountability. Furthermore, he served as the secretary of the Presidential Commission on Revenue Allocation from 1979 to 1980.

He was a member of the Study Group tasked with reviewing the Federal Civil Service in 1985. He was a member of the Abubakar Tafawa Balewa Board of Trustees and Vision 2010. Most recently, since 2018, he has served as a board member of Link Africa Diaspora Services Ltd.
