= Tivoid languages =

Subfamily of the Southern Bantoid languages

Tivoid
- Geographic distribution: Southeastern Nigeria, southwestern Cameroon
- Linguistic classification: Niger–Congo?: Atlantic–Congo; Volta-Congo; Benue–Congo; Bantoid; Southern Bantoid; Tivoid
- Proto-language: Proto-Tivoid

Language codes
- Glottolog: tivo1239
- The Tivoid languages shown within Nigeria and Cameroon: Uncertain affiliation: Buru Furu Eastern Beboid Menchum Esimbi Isolates: Mesaka other Tivoid: North Tivoid Central Tivoid

The Tivoid languages are a branch of the Southern Bantoid languages spoken in parts of Nigeria and Cameroon. The subfamily takes its name after Tiv, the most spoken language in the group.

The majority are threatened with extinction. The largest of these languages by far is the Tiv language for which the group is named; it had 2 million speakers in 1991. The second largest is the Bitare language; it had 110,000 speakers in 2000. Most apart from Tiv are extremely poorly known, and the next best, Esimbi, has not even been demonstrated to be Tivoid.

== Languages ==
Following Blench (2010), Tivoid languages fall into three branches, though North Tivoid languages are almost unattested. The names in parentheses are dialects per Ethnologue, separate languages per Blench:

- Tivoid
  - Central Tivoid
    - A
      - Tiv–Iyive–Otank
      - Evant
      - Ceve (Oliti)
    - B
      - Caka (Batanga, Asaka)
      - Ipulo (Olulu)
      - Eman (Amanavil)
  - Mesaka (Ugarə)
  - North Tivoid
    - Batu (Afi, Kamino)
    - Abon
    - Bitare
    - ? Ambo

Esimbi is well attested, but there is not much reason to consider it Tivoid; it has just about as much in common with Grassfields languages. The status of Buru within Tivoid is also uncertain.

SIL Ethnologue lists three additional languages, Manta, Balo and Osatu, based on an old, provisional assignment of Blench; Blench (2010) states they are instead in the Southwest Grassfields (Western Momo) family.

The Momo languages, traditionally classified as Grassfields, may be closer to Tivoid, though that may be an effect of contact.

Menchum, traditionally classified as Grassfields, may also be a Grassfields language or closer to Tivoid.

== Names and locations (Nigeria) ==
Below is a list of Tivoid language names, populations, and locations (in Nigeria only) from Blench (2019).

Language	Cluster	Alternate spellings	Own name for language	Endonym(s)	Other names (location-based)	Other names for language	Exonym(s)	Speakers	Location(s)
Abon		Abong	Abõ	Abõ	Abon		Ba’ban	Only spoken in Abong town	Taraba State, Sardauna LGA, Abong town (east of Baissa)
Batu cluster	Batu							25,000 (SIL)	Taraba State, Sardauna LGA, several villages east of Baissa, below the Mambila escarpment
Amanda–Afi cluster	Batu								Taraba State, Sardauna LGA, Batu Amanda and Batu Afi villages
Angwe	Batu								Taraba State, Sardauna LGA, Batu Angwe village
Kamino	Batu								Taraba State, Sardauna LGA, Batu Kamino village
Emane		Amana						No proof of permanent communities in Nigeria	Cross River State, Obudu LGA; and in Cameroon
Evant		Avande, Evand, Ovande				Balagete, Belegete			Cross River State, Obudu LGA and in Cameroon
Iceve cluster	Iceve					Banagere, Iyon, Utse, Utser, Utseu		5,000 in Nigeria, 7,000 in Cameroon (1990 est.)	Cross River State, Obudu LGA and in adjacent Cameroon
Ceve	Iceve	Icheve, Becheve, Bacheve, Bechere,	Iceve	Baceve			Ochebe, Ocheve (names of founding ancestor)		Cross River State, Obudu LGA and mainly in adjacent Cameroon
Maci	Iceve	Matchi	Maci		Kwaya, Olit, Oliti				Cross River State, Obudu LGA
Iyive		Uive	Yiive	Ndir		Asumbo (Cover term used in Cameroon)		2,000	Benue State, Kwande LGA, near Turan; and in Cameroon (several villages in Manyu Département)
Otank		Utanga, Otanga						2,000 (1953 Bohannan); 2,500 (SIL)	Cross River State, Obudu LGA; Benue State, Kwande LGA
Tiv		Tív, Tivi					Munshi (not recommended)	800,000 (1952); 1,500,000 (1980 UBS)	Benue State, Makurdi, Gwer, Gboko Kwande, Vandeikya and Katsina Ala LGAs; Nasarawa State, Lafia LGA; Taraba State, Wukari, Takum, Bali LGA; and in Cameroon
Ugarә						Binangeli, Messaka		5000 (1994 est.)	Cassetta & Cassetta (1994): ‘Probably 75‒80% of Ugare speakers live on the Cameroon side of the border, in the Akwaya subdivision of Cameroon’s Southwest Province.’
Bitare						Njwande, Yukutare		3,700 in Cameroon (1987 SIL); 3,000 in Nigeria (1973 SIL)	Taraba State; Sardauna LGA, near Baissa; and in Cameroon
Ambo								A single village east of Baissa	Taraba State, Sardauna LGA

== See also ==
- Tivoid word lists (Wiktionary)
