= Esimbi language =

Tivoid language of southwestern Cameroon

Esimbi
- Region: Southwestern Cameroon
- Native speakers: 34,800 (2005)
- Language family: Niger–Congo?: Atlantic–Congo; Volta-Congo; Benue–Congo; Bantoid; Southern Bantoid; Tivoid; Esimbi

Language codes
- ISO 639-3: ags
- Glottolog: esim1238

Esimbi is a Tivoid language of southwestern Cameroon. It is also called Isimbi, Simpi, Age, Aage, Bogue and Mburugam.

== Writing system ==
Esimbi alphabet
a	b	bh	d	e	ə	ɛ	f	g	h	i	k	kp	l	m	n	ŋ	p	o	ɔ	r	s	t	u	v	y

High tone is indicated with an acute accent and medium tone is indicated with a macron.
