= Busam language =

Grassfields language of Cameroon

Busam
- Native to: Cameroon
- Native speakers: 3,400 (2005)
- Language family: Niger–Congo?: Atlantic–Congo; Benue–Congo; Southern Bantoid; Grassfields; Southwest; Busam

Language codes
- ISO 639-3: bxs
- Glottolog: busa1251

Busam is a Grassfields language of Cameroon.
