= Charity Angya =

Nigerian Vice Chancellor

- Education: University of Jos
- Occupation: Vice Chancellor
- Known for: Vice-Chancellor

Charity Angya was a Nigerian Vice Chancellor at Benue State University.

== Life ==
Charity Angya graduated at the University of Jos in 1983. She took her honours and doctorate at the University of Ibadan.

In 2000 Charity Angya's plays were published under the title "The Cycle of the Moon, and Other Plays" and in 2005 her book titled "Perspectives on Violence Against Women in Nigeria" was published.

Angya was appointed to be Vice Chancellor of Benue State University in November 2010 where she was already working.

Professor Msugh N. Kembe took over from Angya as the Vice-chancellor on 3 November 2015.

In 2017, Angya assisted in the investigation of a sex-for-marks scandal at Benue State University.

On 1 June 2021 Angya was at a meeting of women concerned at the number of killings by "herdsman". The women met at a hotel dressed in mourning clothes and called on the President to take action. Spokespeople for the women were Mrs Rebecca Apezan who was a former member of parliament and Angya as a former vice-chancellor.

== Private life ==
She is married to Paul Angya who is a technocrat.

== See also ==
- List of vice chancellors in Nigeria
