= Ate-u-tiv =

Traditional hut built from stakes and straw by the tiv people

Ate-u-Tiv (sometimes written as "Ate u Tiv" and less popularly known as "Tsun") is a kind of communal reception hut built by the Tiv People of the Middle-belt Region of Nigeria in West Africa.

The word "Atē" stands for the round, open hut; while "Átē-ŭ-Tiv" attributes it to the Tiv people. The Ate-u-Tiv serves as a relaxation and reception point for "vanya" (guests) and allows "mbamaren, ônov man angbianev" (family members) to "tema imiôngo" (chat), sharing ideas and telling stories. The "Orya" (family head) receives guests and attend to family issues (discussions) from the "Ate".

A traditional Ate-u-Tiv is supported by a minimum of six poles called "mtôm" which are y-shaped at the top; these serve as the pillars. The total number of poles depends on the diameter of the Ate. The poles are erected upright in a circle, spaced evenly. The "ukyaver", stems of slim climbing plants form a sort of lintel to hold the roof.

The roof of an "Ate-u-Tiv" comprise "ihyange" (paulins) and "ihila" (grass). The ihyange are woven together in a cone-shape with ukyaver holding together the rafters. The completed structure is then hoisted unto the pillars/lintel with the coned-top upright. Ihila, having been woven together, is then used to provide a thick-layered roofing. This roof filters incoming air making it cool and clean and at the same time stopping the rains.

The Tiv people are well known for their hospitality and the "Ate-u-Tiv" is an important component of this hospitality. In order to readily receive visitors, each compound builds an "Ate" which is furnished with chairs made from wood, canes, etc. In modern days, the components of the "Ate" may vary. Some roofs are now a combination of iron roofing sheets covered by grass that may not necessarily be "ihila"; paulins are regularly made of plywood, etc. The "Ate" design now adorns public places such as hotel gardens, public amusement parks, zoos, museums, etc. New usage of the term "Ate-u-Tiv" may refer to a meeting place, social network or forum.

== See also ==
- Tiv people
- Tiv language
