= Emmanuel Kucha =

Emmanuel Iornumbe Kucha (born August 8, 1950) at Awe Local Government Area of Nasarawa State was the vice chancellor of the University of Agriculture, Makurdi. Kucha, a professor of Mechanical Engineering is the first engineering professor and the first indigene of the host community to serve as the vice chancellor of the institution. Youths from the host community had previously been calling for the appointment of an indigene as the vice chancellor of the institution.

== Background ==
Professor Kucha obtained his PhD in mechanical engineering from the Ahmadu Bello University, Zaria and Michigan Technological University, Michigan, United States. He won the "Design of Improved Wood/Agricultural Waste Stove" award and "Outstanding Research Project Award" at the Nigerian Universities Research and Development Fair awarded by the National Universities Commission, in Abuja, December, 2005. He has over 20 publications.
