= Semi-Bantu =

Semi-Bantu is a language classification within the Niger-Congo group of languages proposed by linguist Carl Meinhof. The Semi-Bantu or Semibantu are specific inhabitants of the Western grassfields of Cameroon (portions of the Adamawa, West, Northwest, and Southwest regions), who speak languages that have certain characteristics to the Bantu language family, particularly the noun class system that is characteristic of Bantu languages. but are excluded from them. The people themselves are considered ethnically and linguistically divergent from other Bantu peoples of central and southern Africa.

When these ethnic groups migrated into northern Cameroon, their languages were influenced by the languages of both Bantu-speaking ethnic groups in the forests to the south and of the Benue-Congo-speaking peoples of the savannas to the north.
