= Ambo language (Nigeria) =

Tivoid language of Nigeria

Ambo
- Native to: Nigeria
- Region: Taraba State
- Native speakers: (undated figure of 1,000 or fewer)
- Language family: Niger–Congo?: Atlantic–Congo; Benue–Congo; Southern Bantoid; Tivoid; North?; Ambo

Language codes
- ISO 639-3: amb
- Glottolog: ambo1249

Ambo is a Tivoid language of Nigeria.
