= Bitare language =

Tivoid language spoken in West Africa

Bitare
- Native to: Nigeria, Cameroon
- Native speakers: (52,000 cited 2000–2003)
- Language family: Niger–Congo?: Atlantic–Congo; Benue–Congo; Southern Bantoid; Tivoid; North; Bitare

Language codes
- ISO 639-3: brt
- Glottolog: bita1251

Bitare (Njwande, Yukutare) is a Tivoid language of Nigeria and Cameroon.
