= Caka language =

Tivoid language spoken in Cameroon

Caka
- Native to: Cameroon
- Native speakers: (5,000 cited 1983)
- Language family: Niger–Congo?: Atlantic–Congo; Benue–Congo; Southern Bantoid; Tivoid; Central (B); Caka

Language codes
- ISO 639-3: ckx
- Glottolog: caka1240

Caka is a Tivoid language of Cameroon. Dialects are Batanga and Asaka.
