= Abon language =

Tivoid language of Nigeria

Abon
- Abong, Abõ, Ba'ban
- Native to: Nigeria
- Region: Taraba State
- Ethnicity: Ba’ban
- Native speakers: (1,000 cited 1973)
- Language family: Niger–Congo?: Atlantic–Congo; Benue–Congo; Southern Bantoid; Tivoid; North; Abon

Language codes
- ISO 639-3: abo
- Glottolog: abon1238

Abon (Abõ) is a Tivoid language of Nigeria.
