= Msugh Moses Kembe =

Nigerian academic

Msugh Moses Kembe (born Binev Ward, Tombo Mbalagh, Buruku, Local Government Area, Benue State, Nigeria) is an academic and the 5th substantive Vice chancellor of Benue State University. He was appointed by Benue state governor Dr. Samuel Ortom and assumed office on November 3, 2015.

== Early life and education ==
Kembe attended Bristow Secondary School in Gboko (1974), and received his WASSCE in 1979. He received a Bachelor of Science in Mathematics at the University of Jos in 1984, a masters in statistics in 1992 at the University of Nigeria, Nsukka, and his Ph.D. in statistics in 2009 at the Federal University of Agriculture, Makurdi. Kembe started his academic career as a lecturer in mathematics and computer science in 1993, becoming a professor in statistics in 2012 at Benue State University.

Kembe was also the Head of the Department of Mathematics and Computer Science at Benue State. He was once a member of the university senate.

== Awards ==
Kembe won the World Bank grant for the Africa Centre of Excellence for Food Technology and Research (CEFTER).

== Personal life ==
Kembe is married to Professor Elizabeth Kembe.
