= Ipulo language =

Tivoid language of Cameroon

Ipulo
- Assumbo
- Native to: Cameroon
- Native speakers: (2,500 cited 1990)
- Language family: Niger–Congo?: Atlantic–Congo; Benue–Congo; Southern Bantoid; Tivoid; Central (B); Ipulo
- Dialects: Olulu; Tinta

Language codes
- ISO 639-3: ass
- Glottolog: ipul1238

Ipulo or Assumbo is a Tivoid language of Cameroon. The rather divergent dialects are Olulu and Tinta/Etongo.
