= Eman language =

Tivoid language of Cameroon

Eman
- Native to: Cameroon
- Native speakers: (800 cited 1990)
- Language family: Niger–Congo?: Atlantic–Congo; Benue–Congo; Southern Bantoid; Tivoid; Central (B); Eman

Language codes
- ISO 639-3: emn
- Glottolog: eman1238
- ELP: Eman

Eman is a Tivoid language of Cameroon. The rather divergent dialects are Eman proper and Amanavil.
