= Evant language =

Southern Bantoid language spoken in Nigeria

Evant
- Native to: Nigeria, Cameroon
- Native speakers: (10,000 cited 1996)
- Language family: Niger–Congo?: Atlantic–Congo; Benue–Congo; Southern Bantoid; Tivoid; Central (A); Evant

Language codes
- ISO 639-3: bzz
- Glottolog: evan1238
- ELP: Evant

Evant is a Tivoid language of Nigeria. Evant has and efforts are currently underway to document and preserve it.
