= Manta language =

Southwest Grassfields language of Cameroon

Manta
- Anta
- Native to: Cameroon
- Native speakers: 5,300 Manta (2001); 300 Áncá (2006)
- Language family: Niger–Congo?: Atlantic–Congo; Benue–Congo; Southern Bantoid; Grassfields; Southwest; Manta
- Dialects: Manta; Tanka; Batakpa

Language codes
- ISO 639-3: Either: myg – Manta acb – Áncá (?)
- Glottolog: mant1267 Manta anca1236 Anca

Manta (Anta, Banta) is a Grassfields language of Cameroon.

Áncá of Nigeria may be the same language, but it is unattested.
