= Batu language =

Tivoid language spoken in Nigeria

Batu
- Afi
- Region: Nigeria
- Native speakers: (undated figure of 25,000)
- Language family: Niger–Congo?: Atlantic–Congo; Benue–Congo; Southern Bantoid; Tivoid; North; Batu
- Dialects: Amanda–Afi; Kamino

Language codes
- ISO 639-3: btu
- Glottolog: batu1255

Batu is a Tivoid language of Nigeria. Dialects are Amanda-Afi, Kamino. Angwe was once assumed to be one, but turns out to be a dialect of the divergent Buru language.
