= Mesaka language =

Tivoid language spoken in Cameroon

Mesaka
- Ugarə
- Native to: Cameroon
- Native speakers: (14,000 cited 1982)
- Language family: Niger–Congo?: Atlantic–Congo; Volta-Congo; Benue–Congo; Bantoid; Southern Bantoid; Tivoid; Mesaka

Language codes
- ISO 639-3: iyo
- Glottolog: mesa1245

Mesaka, or Ugarə, is a Tivoid language spoken in Cameroon.

Batomo may be a separate language, or it may be the same as Motomo (Oliti, Matchi), a dialect of Iceve-Maci (Ethnologue, 22nd edition).

== Phonology ==
=== Vowels ===
Vowel length is often contrastive in sequences of two similar vowels. Sequences of dissimilar vowels are not observed unless there's a consonant in-between.

Vowels of Mesaka
	Front	Central	Back
Close	i	ɨ	u
Close-mid	e		o
Open-mid	ɛ		ɔ
Open		ä	

Mesaka is also a tonal language with two tones: high and low.
