= Iceve-Maci language =

Tivoid language of Cameroon and Nigeria

Ceve
- Oliti
- Iceve
- Native to: Cameroon, Nigeria
- Native speakers: (12,000 cited 1990)
- Language family: Niger–Congo?: Atlantic–Congo; Benue–Congo; Southern Bantoid; Tivoid; Central (A); Ceve

Language codes
- ISO 639-3: bec
- Glottolog: icev1238

Ceve
- People: Baceve
- Language: Iceve

Ceve (Iceve), or Iceve-Maci, is a Tivoid language of the Cameroons. The divergent dialects are Ceve proper (Becheve), and Maci (Matchi, Oliti).

== Writing system ==
Iceve-Maci Alphabet
a	b	c	d	e	ɛ	f	g	gb	gh	h	i	k	kp	l	m	n	ŋ	o	ɔ	p	s	t	u	ʉ	v	w	y	z

=== Multigraphs ===
Digraphs	mb	nd	ng	ny	nz	ŋw	ŋm
IPA	^{m}b	^{n}d	^{ŋ}g	^{n}j	^{n}dz	^{ŋ}w	ŋm
Trigraph	mgb						
IPA	^{ŋm}gb						

=== Tone indication ===
Notation	á	à or a	â	ă	àâ
Tone description	High	Low	Falling	Rising	Falling-rising

== Phonology ==
=== Consonants ===
	Labial	Alveolar/Postalveolar	Palatal	Velar	Labiovelar	Glottal
Nasal	m	n		ŋ	ŋm	
Plosive	p b ^{m}b	t d ⁿd		k g ^{ŋ}g	kp gb ^{ŋm}gb	
Affricate		t͡s ~ t͡ʃ d͡z ~ d͡ʒ ⁿd͡z				
Fricative	f v	s ~ ʃ				h
Approximant		l	j ^{ɲ}j		w ⁿw	

=== Vowels ===
	Front	Central	Back
Close	i	ɨ	u
Near-close			ʊ
Close-mid	e		o
Open/Open-mid	a		ɔ

==== Tones ====
There are 5 tones: high, low, falling, rising and rising-falling.
