= Paul Unongo =

Nigerian politician, statesman and teacher

Paul Iyorpuu Unongo OFR
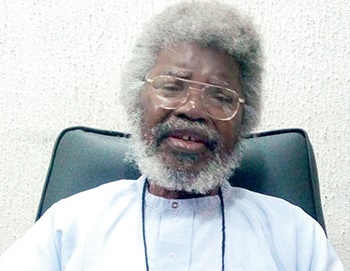

Minister of Mines and Steel Development
- In office December 1979 – February 1982

Personal details
- Born: Paul Iyorpuu Unongo; 26 September 1935 Kwande, Northern Nigeria Protectorate (now in Benue State, Nigeria)
- Died: 29 November 2022 (aged 87) Jos Plateau State, Nigeria
- Party: National Council of Nigeria and the Cameroons (1959–1966); Nigerian People's Party (1970–1985); Social Democratic Party (1989–1993); All Nigeria Peoples Party
- Spouse(s): Victoria Avarave Unongo; Elizabeth Unongo
- Children: 22+
- Education: University of Alberta
- Profession: teacher, politician

Paul Iyorpuu Unongo (September 26, 1935 – November 29, 2022), commonly known as Wantaregh Paul Unongo among his kinsmen, the Tiv people, was a Nigerian nationalist, politician, statesman, teacher, and philanthropist. He founded the Community of Tiv Students and is regarded as one of the fathers of modern Tiv politics.

Unongo served as the Minister of Steel development during Nigeria's Second Republic. Before going into politics, he was a lecturer at the University of Lagos, where he played a key role in establishing and consolidating the Department of Psychology and its degree-awarding programs.

In 1975, he was selected as one of fifty distinguished Nigerians, often referred to as the 'Fifty Wise Men,' by General Murtala Muhammed to draft a constitution for modern Nigeria as the country transitioned to civilian rule. Unongo also participated in the 1994 Constitutional Conference, where he chaired the States Creation Committee.

Alongside notable figures like Tunji Otegbeye, Solomon Lar, Alhaji Abubakar Rimi, and his role model, Nnamdi Azikiwe, Unongo helped form the Nigerian People's Party (NPP), becoming its inaugural secretary general. He was a devoted political admirer and student of Nnamdi Azikiwe and served as the official opposition leader to J.S. Tarkaa in Benue State.

== Early life ==
Paul Iyorpuu Unongo was born on September 26, 1935, to Unongo Kwaghngise Anure Abera in Turan, Northern Nigeria Protectorate which is the present-day Kwande Local Government Area of Benue State and his wife Lante Kukwa, an Etulo lady from Adi, present-day Buruku Local Government Area of Benue State. His father, Kwaghngise, worked as a teacher for the Tiv Native Authority.

Unongo spent much of his early life under the guidance of his uncle, Jato Aka, a magico-spiritualist.

In 1945, Unongo began his primary education at Gboko Central School, then known as Mbayion Clan Elementary School. There, he encountered Tarka Nachi, the headmaster and father of Senator Joseph Sarwuan Tarka, an advocate for minority rights in Nigeria. Paul also met other Tiv personalities, including Justin Iyorbee Tseayo, who later became the first Tiv professor, and Shima Gyoh, who became the second Tiv medical doctor and a close friend of Unongo.

In November 1958, Unongo secured a part-time position as an entries clerk at Barclays Bank, DCO. He was promoted to the rank of acting sub-accountant in 1959. Eventually, he received an admission offer to further his studies in Zaria, prompting him to leave the banking job.

== Education ==
Unongo received his primary education at Gboko Central School from 1945 to 1948. From 1952 to 1956, Paul studied at Katsina-Ala Middle School. He then attended Government College, Keffi, from 1957 to 1959. In October 1959, he enrolled in the Nigerian College of Arts, Science, and Technology in Zaria (now known as Ahmadu Bello University, Zaria) for Pre-Medicine. This program was essentially an Advanced Level GCE in Zoology, Physics, and Chemistry, and he completed his courses in 1960.

In 1960, he gained admission to Canada to study experimental psychology at the University of Calgary. After two years in Calgary, he transferred to the University of Alberta in Edmonton, where he completed his B.Sc. in May 1966 and his M.Sc. in 1968, specializing in human experimental psychopathology. He was then awarded a six-year scholarship by the former Northern Regional Government of Nigeria to pursue a Ph.D. program in Psychology at the University of London. Although he began the program, he dropped out in the same year, 1968.

In 1968, Unongo began his career as a lecturer in psychology at the University of Lagos. He was instrumental in establishing the Department of Psychology at the institution, where he served for four academic years, from 1968 to 1972. Unongo became the first Tiv person to teach at a university.

== Nigerian civil war ==
During the Nigerian Civil War, the Nigerian government enlisted the services of many technocrats including Paul Unongo. The president, Yakubu Gowon sent Dr. Adetoro Joseph Eyitayo to recruit technocrats to assist in the war. Unongo was among those selected. He provided an apologia that served as the theoretical basis for humane warfare. Additionally, he acted as an envoy for the government to the Americas and also attempted to negotiate with Chukwuemeka Odumegwu Ojukwu through letters before the war broke out; however, none of his letters received a response from the Biafran government.

At the time, Biafra was gaining international sympathy due to the perception that the Nigerian Civil War was a genocide perpetrated by northern Muslims against eastern Christians. To counter this narrative, Unongo was enlisted, along with a Catholic priest, Rev. Father Akor, in the Nigerian diplomatic effort against Biafran propaganda. The two traveled through Canada and the United States, working to dispel the myth of a northern Muslim war against eastern Christians, and they were successful in their mission. Both Paul Unongo and Rev. Father James Akor were northern Christians, and Unongo's effectiveness as a diplomat endeared him to the Yakubu Gowon's administration.

== Political career ==
Paul Unongo had a passion for politics even during his secondary school years. According to an editorial in The Nation newspaper dated December 9, 2022, he admired Nnamdi Azikiwe as a teenager, which led him to register as a member of the National Council of Nigeria and the Cameroons (NCNC) shortly after graduating from secondary school in 1959.

Unongo became actively involved in Nigerian politics in 1970 prior to the Second Nigerian Republic. Like his mentor, Nnamdi Azikiwe, his early political inclinations were shaped by his desire to see a unified Nigeria that transcended ethnic and religious divisions.

He began his transition from Lagos to Jos in 1971 and completely moved to Jos in 1972. He set up a company known as JULADACO Entreprises. His stay in Jos, businesses and the popularity of his book Where Do We Go From Here gave him a certain popularity in the country. He became close friends with the governor of Benue Plateau State, Joseph Gomwalk and propagated some of his ideas.. He influenced the creation of three more divisions (local government areas) out of the very large local government called the Tiv Native Authority. The outcome of this, was the beginning of partying of ways between Unongo and J S Tarka as both leaders had different views about the creation of divisions or local governments in Tivland. This apparent political and development stand appealed to a lot of Tiv people, especially the elite, and gave rise to the birth of the Unongo group as politically opposed to the Tarka group.

=== Second Nigerian Republic ===
Unongo joined the Nigerian Peoples Party (NPP), a political platform founded by Azikiwe. He became one of the key figures in the accord between the National Party of Nigeria (NPN) and his party the NPP. He collaborated with Chuba Okadigbo of the NPN, which won the 1979 Nigerian presidential election, to finalize the agreement that allowed the NPN to take office. In the 95-member Senate, the ruling party had 36 seats, while Unongos party the NPP secured 16 seats. Chief Obafemi Awolowo's Unity Party of Nigeria held 28 seats, and Aminu Kano's People's Redemption Party and Waziri Ibrahim's Great Nigeria People's Party (GNPP) had eight and seven seats, respectively.

Unongo and Okadigbo had little difficulty convincing their parties that the accord was essential for building a stable republic. However, the "accord concordiale," as the Kingsley Ozumba Mbadiwe described it, lasted only a short time.

During the Second Republic (1979–1983), Unongo was appointed as the minister of power and steel under President Shehu Shagari's administration and became a vital member of the Cabinet of Shehu Shagari. During his tenure, he pioneered the establishment of Ajaokuta Steel Mill and set up steel rolling Mills in Katsina, Jos, and Ajaokuta.

=== Third Nigerian Republic ===
He was a prominent member of the Social Democratic Party during the ill-fated Third Nigerian Republic and worked diligently for the victory of Chief MKO Abiola in the 1993 Nigerian presidential election. However, the transition to democracy was unsuccessful. Paul Unongo was actively involved.

At the state level he managed to get Moses Adasu elected as the governor of Benue state on 2 January 1992. He later on played a prominent role at the 1994 Constitutional Conference, serving as the chairman of the States Creation Committee.

=== Fourth Nigerian Republic ===
At the beginning of the Fourth Nigerian Republic. He joined forces with notable Nigerians like Muhammadu Buhari, Chuba Okadigbo, to establish the All Peoples Party, which later became the All Nigeria Peoples Party. Once again, he was the gubernatorial candidate for his party, but he lost to a newcomer, George Akume of the Peoples Democratic Party (PDP), who had both Barnabas Gemade and Iyorchia Ayu's support.

He contested again for the seat of the governor of Benue state in 2003. It became one of the most violent elections in Tiv history.

=== Tiv politics ===
Beside the love for politics and his kinsmen, Unongo saw the style of politics played by the Tiv people in the First Nigerian Republic as primitive and decided to bring brighter Tiv minds like Mvendaga Jibo, Paul Belabo and later Iyorchia Ayu onto the political stage. He began his political career by authoring a book published by Megida Books, Lagos, 1969 titled; Where Do We Go from Here? which quickly became popular among the educated Tiv people. The piece had made its way around Tiv lands even before Unongo arrived for his political campaigns, demonstrating that the ideas had spread.

With the publication of Where Do We Go from Here? in 1969, Unongo illuminated the primitive lifestyle of the Tiv society, allowing both its leaders and readers to recognize their own realities. Consequently, the work became the most discussed publication of its time.

Mvendaga Jibo's insight on this treatise is worth quoting: Unongo's primary aim, as expressed in the publication, was to transition the Tiv people from a 'primitive lifestyle' to a modern one, accompanied by prosperity. He sought to deepen a participatory political culture in which the Tiv would have a more substantial voice in their governance, challenging the existing conditions where they had not fared well in the Nigerian political economy. In short, he called for a political break from the status quo. This represented a direct challenge to the type of politics the Tiv had experienced under Joseph Tarka. From every angle, the publication was a call for revolution in Tiv land.

When Unongo wrote the foreword to the significant volume Paul Unongo: The Intelligentsia and the Politics of Development, published by Aboki Publishers forty years later to commemorate the 40th anniversary of his earlier work, he expressed: The vision and impetus for 'Where Do We Go from Here?' were driven by the dire situation I found among my people in the then Benue-Plateau State, under the leadership of the governor Joseph Gomwalk. My quest was for sustainable poverty alleviation, empowerment, and the development of the Tiv people.

Unongo ran for the governorship of Benue State in the 1979 elections but lost to the National Party of Nigeria (NPN), to which Joseph Tarka belonged. Aper Aku, the candidate representing the NPN, won decisively. However, Unongo's struggles continued. He contested the governorship again in 1983 under the platform of the NPP but lost again to Aper Aku from the NPN.

He attempted again to be elected as Benue State governor in 1999 on the platform of the All Nigerian Peoples Party (ANPP) but lost to the Peoples Democratic Party (Nigeria) (PDP) who had Barnabas Gemade, David Mark and Iyorchia Ayu as the leaders in the state. He sought justice at the election tribunal in Makurdi but was unsuccessful at both the tribunal and the Court of Appeal.

He contested again to be the governor of Benue state in 2003. It became one of the most violent elections in Tiv political history. This was completely against what Unongos political ideologies were. so, he decided to take a back seat in Tiv partisan politics.

=== Rivalry with Tarka ===
Unongo secured his teaching position at the University of Lagos with the assistance of Joseph Tarka. It was Tarka who introduced his young associate, Unongo, to his friend Abudu Yesufu Eke. At the time, Eke was the Federal commissioner for Education and was effectively serving as the registrar of the University of Lagos, which helped Unongo obtain his teaching job there.

Unongo's decision to return to Nigeria and engage in political activism did not sit well with the Tiv political leadership, most loyal to Tarka from the Nigerian First Republic. Tarka was distraught that his formerly brilliant associate, Paul Unongo, who had just returned from abroad, now had a different vision for the Tiv people. Tarka believed that Unongo had aligned himself with the new military administration of Joseph Gomwalk in Jos the headquarters of Benue-Plateau State to undermine his legitimacy, influence, and control over Tiv politics.

According to Iyorwuese Hagher, Unongo's booklet *Where Do We Go from Here* outlined a political manifesto for Nigeria and the Tiv region. In the text, Unongo introduced himself to the Nigerian political landscape by stating, "I confess most proudly that I am a Tiv Tribesman but a most dedicated Nigerian nationalist."

Paul Unongo's strategic political mobilization of Tiv cultural dances and performances, combined with his engagement of financial resources, youth, and elite members of society, significantly constrained the political space available to Tarka. Despite Tarka's efforts to stage a comeback during the Constitutional Conference of 1978, Unongo's calculated maneuvers ultimately resulted in Tarka's disqualification due to his failure to file taxes promptly. Barrister J.T. Vembe, a young lawyer from Mbakor—Tarka's immediate constituency—assumed Tarka's position. Unongo led a delegation of intellectuals to the 1978 Constitutional Conference, where they collaborated on the drafting of the 1979 Constitution. Meanwhile, Tarka retreated into exile at his residence in Highgate, London. During this period, he resolved to return to Nigeria and seek retribution for the humiliation he endured at the hands of his former political ally, Unongo.

As the prohibition on party politics was lifted by the Obasanjo military government, Tarka revitalized the structures of the United Middle Belt Congress (UMBC) and meticulously plotted his return, despite grappling with his health challenges posed by cancer. He mobilized his traditional support base and recruited younger constituents from within Unongo's elite circles. Tarka's group subsequently evolved into the National Party of Nigeria (NPN). In parallel, Unongo allied with Nnamdi Azikiwe and assumed the role of Secretary of the Nigerian Peoples Party.

Unongo made a significant entry into Tiv and Benue politics, successfully establishing a substantial political platform and gathering a fervent following. He was unwavering in his refusal to compromise, engage in dialogue, or seek any form of accommodation with the older political generation from the first republic, which remained loyal to their leader, J.S. Tarka, who was passionately revered by the Tiv people.

This situation led to a dichotomy between the elite and the masses, a division that has continued to shape the political dynamics in Benue. The 1979 elections served as a critical benchmark for determining whether Unongo's New Progressive Party (NPP) would secure victory in Benue State or whether the National Party of Nigeria (NPN), under the leadership of Tarka, would prevail. Ultimately, the NPP experienced defeat, with the NPN winning the election considerably. Nevertheless, Unongo capitalized on this outcome by initiating the NPN/NPP alliance, which facilitated the transition into the Second Republic, much to Tarka's dismay, who had led the NPN to victory.

Unongo's adversarial approach resulted in Benue State obtaining a significant number of ministerial positions. The Tiv people notably benefited from having both Unongo appointed as the Minister of Steel Development and Isaac Shaahu serving as the Minister of Commerce. The Tiv Native authority too was divided into more local governments which gave the Tiv people more jobs and more opportunities in the government.

== Arrests and detention ==
Unongo was arrested in 1990 after Gideon Orkar attempted to topple the military administration of Ibrahim Babangida through a coup d'état dubbed 1990 Nigerian coup attempt. This has been recorded as the bloodiest coup in Nigerian history. Paul Unongo was arrested with the Tiv historian, Tesemchi Makar and other Tiv people. The basis for these arrests was suspicion of conspiracy to overthrow the government as they together with Gideon Orkar were Tiv people. They were arrested in Benue and taken to Lagos detained indefinitely. They were later released because of the efforts made by their lawyer Chenge N. Richard.

Amnesty International's report on the matter on pages 7 and 8 of its reports on human rights concerns on Nigeria in 1990 states that; Some were believed to have been released fairly quickly. These included Major Gideon Orkar's brothers, Joseph Targema Orkar, a former Benue State official, and David Orkar, a lecturer at Ahmadu Bello University, Zaria. Major Orkar's step-mother, Ubende Orkar, was detained but subsequently released without charge. Dr Tesemchi Makar, a cultural leader of the Tiv ethnic group, to which Major Orkar belonged, and also a former Benue State official, was apparently arrested.

Unongo was again arrested in 2003 after the 2003 Benue State gubernatorial election. He was the gubernatorial candidate of the All Nigeria Peoples Party (ANPP) in Benue State. He was arrested and detained at the Maitama divisional police station in Abuja and charged with incitement and impersonation for allegedly declaring himself as the governor-elect of Benue State. He was later released on bail by a Makurdi Chief Magistrate.

== Katsina Ala State ==
Unongo has always been a strong proponent for the creation of more states in Nigeria and has also agitated for the creation of Katsina Ala state. He argued that the Tiv people should also have a minimum of 2 states with each state having a population of over 2.5 million people. He suggested that the Tiv who were carved into Taraba state during its creation(which is excessively large) and the Tiv carved to form the Nasarawa state would have been adjusted to conveniently accommodate two states; Benue and Katsina Ala states. This would in turn solve the communal clashes and political marginalization experienced by the Tiv on their ancestral lands in both Nasarawa state and Taraba state. His argument gained momentum and the attempt was made once by General Ibrahim Babangida in 1990 during the creation of the 9 states and later twice by General Sani Abacha. The first attempt under Abacha was in 1996 during the creation of the 6 states. His efforts were frustrated by the Tiv political elite who were the political allies of Tarka. The last attempt on the matter was made again by General Sani Abacha in 1996 when he wanted to honor Lt General Victor Malu with a state. The matter was still opposed by the Tor Tiv IV, Alfred Akawe Torkula.

== Criticism ==
Unongo has faced criticism for attempting to assume multiple roles—godfather, father figure, social critic, and activist—within Tiv politics during his time. His political maneuvering made many Tiv elites uneasy, particularly when he supplanted Paul Belabo as the candidate for the Nigerian People's Party (NPP) in the 1983 governorship election, leaving Belabo feeling very bitter also noted that when Paul Unongo was appointed minister in Shehu Shagari's NPN-controlled administration, he viewed Aper Aku's leadership as a threat to his ambitions of becoming a prominent leader among the Tiv and in Benue State. To gain an advantage, Unongo allegedly sidelined Paul Belabo, the NPP's gubernatorial candidate, to enter the 1983 race himself. Additionally, Unongo had a fallout with Chia Surma, whom he had appointed as a commissioner under the Gomwalk administration in what was then Benue-Plateau State.

== Retirement from partisan politics ==
After his outing in the 2003 Benue State gubernatorial election, Unongo decided to retire from partisan politics but remained a significant voice in Nigeria's political landscape, particularly in Northern Nigeria. He became a founding member and the Convener/Leader of the Arewa Consultative Forum (ACF), a group established to protect the political, economic, and cultural interests of the Northern region.

In his later years, Unongo became an elder statesman, offering counsel and mentorship to younger politicians and leaders across Nigeria. He was frequently called upon to mediate political disputes and provide guidance on national issues. Among his mentees were Gabriel Suswam and Samuel Ortom.

In 2017, Unongo succeeded Maitama Sule as the chairman of the Northern Elders' Forum. Until his death in 2022, he held the position of chairman of the governing council of the Nigerian Educational Research and Development Council.

== Personal life ==
Unongo was married traditionally to Victoria Avarave Unongo, the sister of his friend Justin Tseayo. His early children were Jude, Lante (named after his mother), David, Pauline and Alex. He has a sister, Kwaghhemba Ugba, the mother of Steve Ugbah (Ambassador of Nigeria to Russia). Later, he married Elizabeth Unongo. He collectively has over 22 children, both biological and adopted.

The Tiv love mysteries, myths, and mythical figures, and have hence transformed Paul Unongo into a subject of endless mythological tales. According to these stories, he disappeared for years as an infant, nurtured by benevolent spirits, the guardians of the world and was trained by his uncle Jato Aka a magico-spiritualist. This has resulted into having the ability to evaporate during critical moments, such as when facing a roadblock set by hostile opponents and during a vehicle accident. He was also believed to have the supernatural ability of apparition where he would appear at meetings where discussions revolved around his death or potential harm to his interests. Party loyalists and admirers claimed that no man born of a woman could bring about his demise. This was the essence of Unongo—the man around whom an aura of mystery was woven.

These are just a few of the fantastic stories that circulated about him, and he did little to dispel these rumors. In fact, he seemed to enjoy and even reinforce them, whether intentionally or not. For example, He preferred to travel at night and often wore white regalia with an oversized medallion hanging from his neck. He introduced himself at a significant Tiv event, referring to himself as the Oracle and Traditional Leader of the Tiv people.

To add to the effect, he would often appear on ceremonial days dressed in the complete regalia of a traditional Tiv man, attire typically reserved for a select few traditional Tiv people.

He is fluent in, hausa language, Tiv language, etulo language and the English language

== Philanthropy ==
Unongo's JULADACO group of companies was involved in real estate, transportation, hotels, education and health services among others. One of its schools, JULADACO High School Kassa Plateau State, produced leaders like Rochas Okorocha, Danladi Mohammed Umar, etc. JULADACO also, provided free medical care, built places of worships for communities, awarded domestic and foreign scholarships etc. One of its scholarship recipients is Steve Ugbah.

The JULADACO company which is an acronym for his first three children, JUde, LAnte, DAvid, COmpany had branches in Jos, Katsina Ala, Jato Aka and Gboko. The branches served as the regional sources for all the charity works.

== Advocacy and associations ==
Unongo became a founding member and the Convener/Leader of the Arewa Consultative Forum (ACF). In 2017, Unongo succeeded Maitama Sule as the chairman of the Northern Elders' Forum. Until he died in 2022, he held the position of chairman of the governing council of the Nigerian Educational Research and Development Council.

He received the Pacesetter Award in 2021, from the Benue Journalists Forum of Nigeria (BJFN). He was honored in recognition of his historic accomplishments as the First Tiv University Lecturer in history.

Unongo was conferred with the national honour of Officer of the Federal Republic of Nigeria (OFR) by General Olusegun Obasanjo, the Head of State.

== Legacy ==
Paul Unongo was a renown figure in Nigerian politics. During his career, he served as a mentor to several politicians, including Iyorchia Ayu, Gabriel Suswam, Steve Ugbah, Yima Sen, Samuel Ortom etc.

His legacy as one of the Conveners/leaders of the Arewa Consultative Forum lives on as the group is still living up to its purpose of creation.

The community of Tiv Students(CTS) is on all university campuses where there are at least a dozen Tiv students.

Streets have been named after Unongo in Benue State and Abuja.

=== Legacy to Benue ===
- Paul Unongo was known for his legendary generosity, providing scholarships for Tiv youth to study abroad and making significant appointments for Tiv professionals at Ajaokuta Steel Mill. He used his considerable fortune from the Juladaco company to establish secondary schools and a specialist hospital in Katsina-Ala the headquarters of one of the newly created local government areas.
- His alliance with governor Joseph Gomwalk contributed to the division of the large Tiv Division into three local government administrations.
- He introduced modernization to Tiv and Benue youth, promoting nightlife and pop music. While he personally abstained from alcohol and smoking, many young people adopted this lifestyle. Unongo's influence led many to prioritize social movements over education.
- Unongo made a significant cultural impact in Tivland, altering social norms and reviving traditional rituals. He declared himself the spiritual and political leader of Tivland, a claim that remains unchallenged.
- Unongo's generosity extended beyond scholarships; he provided loans to farmers without expecting repayment. His life was dedicated to improving the lives of the Tiv people and promoting social justice.

=== Legacy to Nigeria ===
- His refusal to support the inclusion of Sharia law in the 1979 constitution was significant. Leading a team of young intellectuals like, Mvendaga Jibo, Solomon Lar, Abubakar Rimi, Omo Omoruyi, Femi Okunnu, and others determined to have a circular constitution he successfully ensured Sharia was excluded from the 1999 Constitution, advocating for a secular nation.
- He served as Chairman of State Creation at the Constitutional Conference in 1994–95, Where he worked hard for the creation of Apah and Katsina-ala States. They successfully recommended the creation of the six geopolitical zones of Nigeria and the establishment of the Federal Character Commission.

== Bibliography ==
Unongo has authored the following books;

- Say It Loud We Are Black and Strong
- Where Do We Go From Here? An Open Letter to the Tiv People of Nigeria.
- Our Tiv Heritage: The Celebration of the Feast of New Yams. A book about the cultivation and production of yams to harvesting and the special festivities that follows up.
- The Case For Nigeria. --- The book is about Nigeria, Politics and government. It tells about the dramatic story about the anxieties of Nigerians as they experiment with multi-nationalism. It attempts to recapitulate not only the glories and the agonies of the young Nigerian nation but also the possibilities that could be hers.
- Steel Development and Nigeria's Power Status. --- Lecture Delivered by Paul Unongo at the Nigerian Institute of International Affairs, Victoria Island, Lagos on Thursday, 24 July 1980.

== Death ==
Unongo died at the Jos University Teaching Hospital, Plateau State on November 29, 2022.
