= 1979 Benue State gubernatorial election =

1979 gubernatorial election in Benue State, Nigeria

- July 28, 1979
Nominee	Aper Aku
Party	NPN
Running mate	Isah Odoma
Governor before election
Adebayo Lawal
Nigerian military junta
Elected Governor
Aper Aku
NPN

The 1979 Benue State gubernatorial election occurred on July 28, 1979. NPN's Aper Aku won election for a first term to become Benue State's first executive governor leading and, defeating main opposition in the contest.

Aper Aku emerged the NPN candidate at the gubernatorial primary election, after defeating Isaac Shaahu and George Atedze. His running mate was Isah Odoma.

== Electoral system ==
The Governor of Benue State is elected using the plurality voting system.

== Results ==
There were five political parties registered by the Federal Electoral Commission (FEDECO) which participated in the election. Aper Aku of the NPN won the contest by polling the highest votes.

Candidate	Party
Aper Aku	National Party of Nigeria (NPN)
Total
Source: Africa Spectrum
