= 1983 Nigerian presidential election =

- 6 August 1983
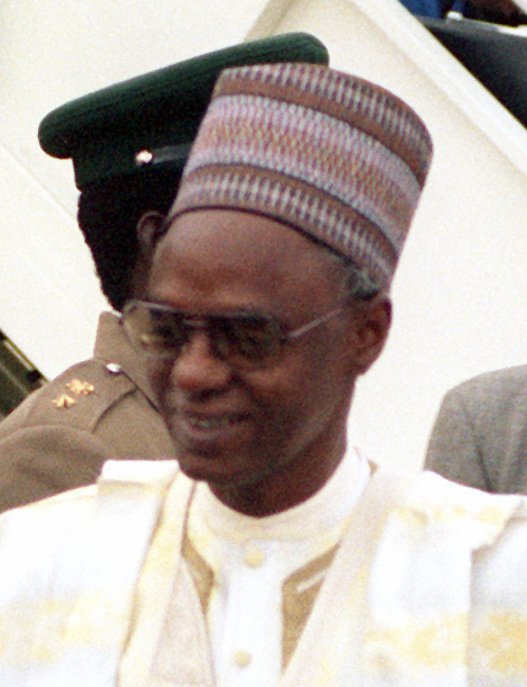

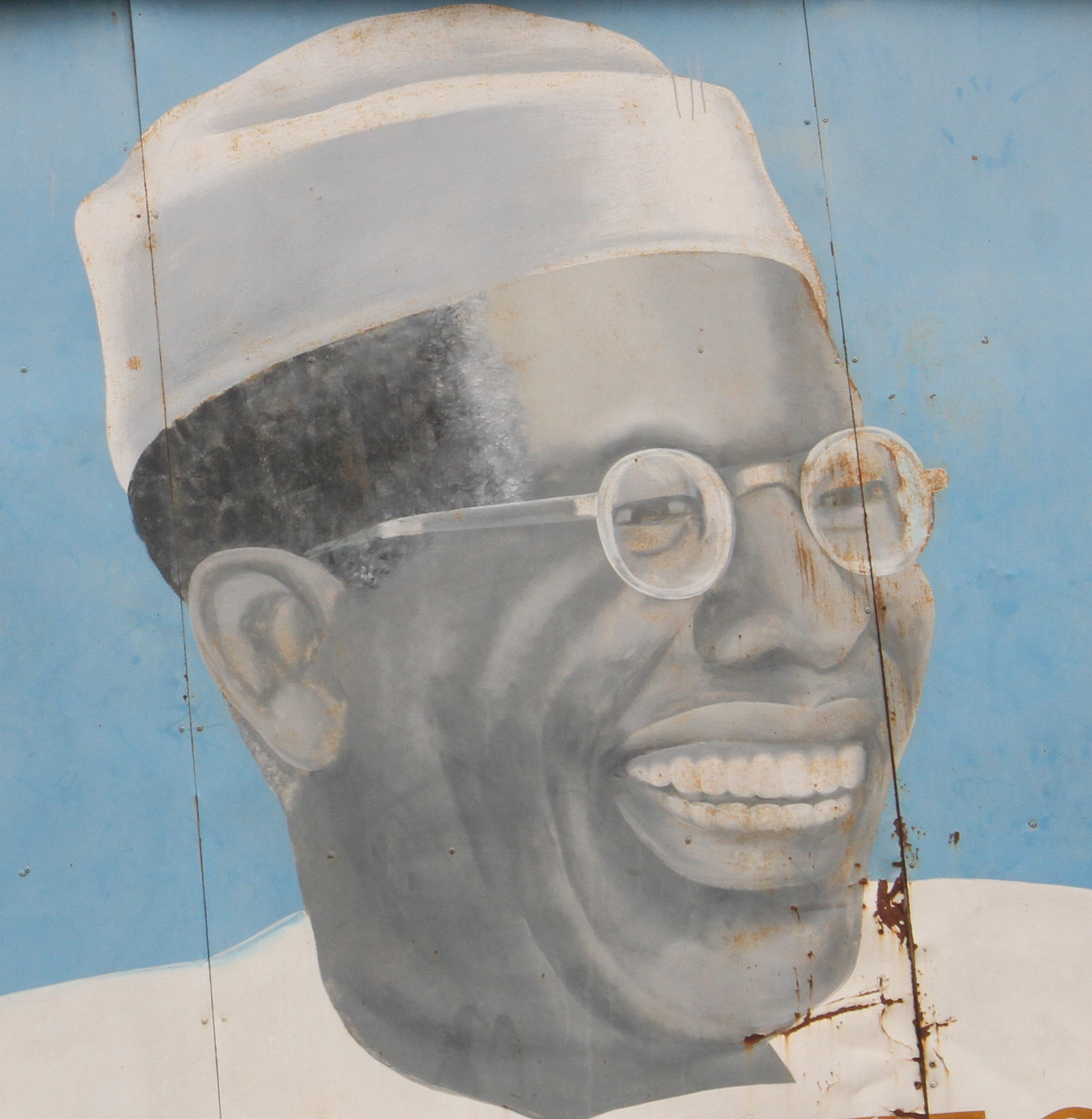

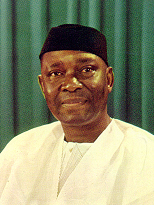
Nominee	Shehu Shagari	Obafemi Awolowo	Nnamdi Azikiwe
Party	NPN	UPN	NPP
Running mate	Alex Ekwueme	Muhammad Kura	Shettima Mustafa
States carried	11	5	2
Popular vote	12,081,471	7,907,209	3,557,113
Percentage	47.51%	31.09%	13.99%
- Results by state
President before election
Shehu Shagari
NPN
Elected President
Shehu Shagari
NPN

Presidential elections were held in Nigeria on 6 August 1983. The result was a victory for incumbent Shehu Shagari, who received 48% of the vote. His National Party of Nigeria won the parliamentary elections held later in the month.

== Results ==
Candidate	Party	Votes	%
Shehu Shagari	National Party of Nigeria	12,081,471	47.51
Obafemi Awolowo	Unity Party of Nigeria	7,907,209	31.09
Nnamdi Azikiwe	Nigerian People's Party	3,557,113	13.99
Khalifa Hassan Yusuf	People's Redemption Party	968,974	3.81
Waziri Ibrahim	Great Nigeria People's Party	643,806	2.53
Tunji Braithwaite	Nigeria Advance Party	271,524	1.07
Total		25,430,097	100.00
Registered voters/turnout		65,304,818	–
Source: Nohlen et al.

== Aftermath ==
The aftermath of the election when Shehu Shagari was announced as the winner,came along with violence and civil unrest in Southwestern part of the country like Oyo and Ondo state.
