= 1999 Benue State gubernatorial election =

1999 gubernatorial election in Benue State, Nigeria

- January 9, 1999
Nominee	George Akume
Party	PDP	All People's Party (Nigeria)
Running mate	Ogiri Ajene
Popular vote	584,530	399,728
Governor before election
Dominic Oneya
Nigerian military junta
Elected Governor
George Akume
PDP

The 1999 Benue State gubernatorial election occurred in Nigeria on January 9, 1999. The PDP nominee George Akume won the election, defeating the APP candidate.

George Akume defeated Mike Mku and others to win the PDP nomination at the primary election. His running mate was Ogiri Ajene.

== Electoral system ==
The Governor of Benue State is elected using the plurality voting system.

== Results ==
PDP's George Akume emerged winner in the contest.

The total number of registered voters in the state for the election was 1,806,121. However, 1,813,000 were previously issued voting cards in the state.

Candidate	Party	Votes	%
George Akume	People's Democratic Party (PDP)	584,530	59.17
All People's Party (APP)	399,728	40.46	
Alliance for Democracy (AD)	3,683	0.37	
Total		987,941	100.00
Registered voters/turnout		1,806,121	–
Source: Nigeria World, IFES
