= 1983 Benue State gubernatorial election =

1983 gubernatorial election in Benue State, Nigeria

- August 13, 1983
Nominee	Aper Aku
Party	NPN
Governor before election
Aper Aku
NPN
Elected Governor
Aper Aku
NPN

The 1983 Benue State gubernatorial election occurred in Nigeria on August 13, 1983. The NPN nominee Aper Aku won the election, defeating other candidates.

Aper Aku emerged NPN candidate.

== Electoral system ==
The Governor of Benue State is elected using the plurality voting system.

== Primary election ==
=== NPN primary ===
The NPN primary election was won by Aper Aku.

== Results ==
Candidate	Party
Aper Aku	National Party of Nigeria
Total
Source: World States Men
