= Veronica Nnaji =

Nigerian nurse and politician

Member of the House of Representatives
- In office 1979–1983
- Constituency: Isu

Personal details
- Born: 10 January 1940 (age 86) Umuaka, Nigeria
- Children: 5
- Occupation: Nigerian nurse and politician.

Veronica Ogechi Nnaji (born 10 January 1940) is a Nigerian nurse and politician. In 1979 she was one of the first group of three women to take their seats in the House of Representatives.

== Biography ==
Nnaji was born in Umuaka in January 1940, one of seven children of farmer Therea Ezendu and trader Mathias Ezendu. She was educated at Holy Rosary School between 1948 and 1955, after which she trained as a nurse at Our Lady of Lourdes Hospital in Ihiala from 1956 to 1960. She then attended the School of Hygiene in Aba and the Health Centre in Nsukka, qualifying as a nurse in 1963. She subsequently worked at Amaigbo Joint Hospital in Nkwerre between 1963 and 1965, after which she worked at the Motherless Babies Home in Okwelle until 1970. She married in 1965 and had five children. In 1974 she became the owner of a maternity home.

In the 1979 parliamentary elections, Nnaji was a Nigerian People's Party candidate in Isu and was elected to the House of Representatives. Alongside Abiola Babatope and Justina Eze, she was one of the first three women elected to Parliament to take their seats (Esther Soyannwo had been elected in 1964 but did not take her seat). She served in parliament until 1983.
