= 1983 Plateau State gubernatorial election =

1983 gubernatorial election in Plateau State, Nigeria

- August 13, 1983
Nominee	Solomon Lar
Party	NPP
Elected Governor
Solomon Lar
NPP

The 1983 Plateau State gubernatorial election occurred on August 13, 1983. NPP candidate Solomon Lar won the election.

== Results ==
Solomon Lar representing NPP won the election. The election held on August 13, 1983.
