= 1999 Kano State gubernatorial election =

1999 gubernatorial election in Kano State, Nigeria

- January 9, 1999
Nominee	Rabiu Kwankwaso	Magaji Abdullahi
Party	PDP	All People's Party (Nigeria)
Running mate	Abdullahi Umar Ganduje
Popular vote	587,619	311,218
Governor before election
Aminu Isa Kontagora
Elected Governor
Rabiu Kwankwaso
PDP

The 1999 Kano State gubernatorial election occurred in Nigeria on January 9, 1999. People's Democratic Party (PDP) candidate Rabiu Kwankwaso won the election, defeating All People's Party (APP) Magaji Abdullahi and other candidates.

== Results ==
Rabiu Kwankwaso from the PDP won the election. Magaji Abdullahi and AD candidate contested in the election.

The total number of registered voters in the state was 3,680,990, total votes cast was 943,189, valid votes was 908,956 and rejected votes was 34,233.

- Rabiu Kwankwaso, (PDP)- 587,619
- Magaji Abdullahi, APP- 311,218
- AD- 10,119
