= 1991 Benue State gubernatorial election =

1991 gubernatorial election in Benue State, Nigeria

Benue gubernatorial election
- December 14, 1991
Nominee	Moses Adasu
Party	SDP
Elected Governor
Moses Adasu
SDP

The 1991 Benue State gubernatorial election occurred on December 14, 1991. SDP candidate Moses Adasu won the election.

== Conduct ==
The gubernatorial election was conducted using an open ballot system. Primaries for the two parties to select their flag bearers were conducted on October 19, 1991.

The election occurred on December 14, 1991. SDP candidate Moses Adasu won the election.
