= 1979 Nigerian presidential election =

- 11 August 1979
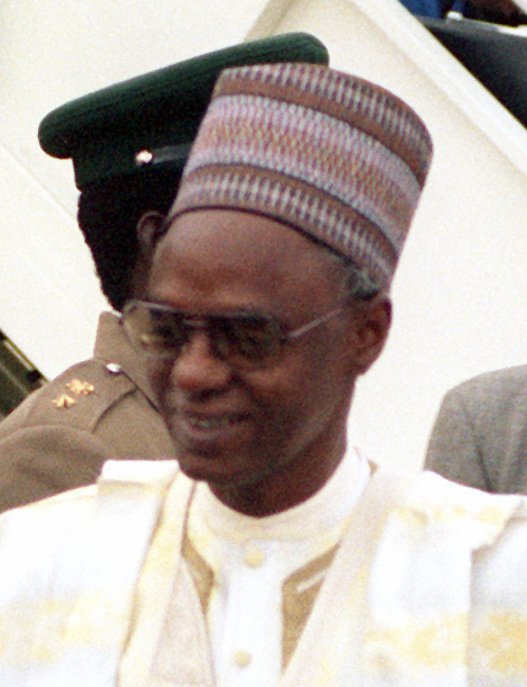

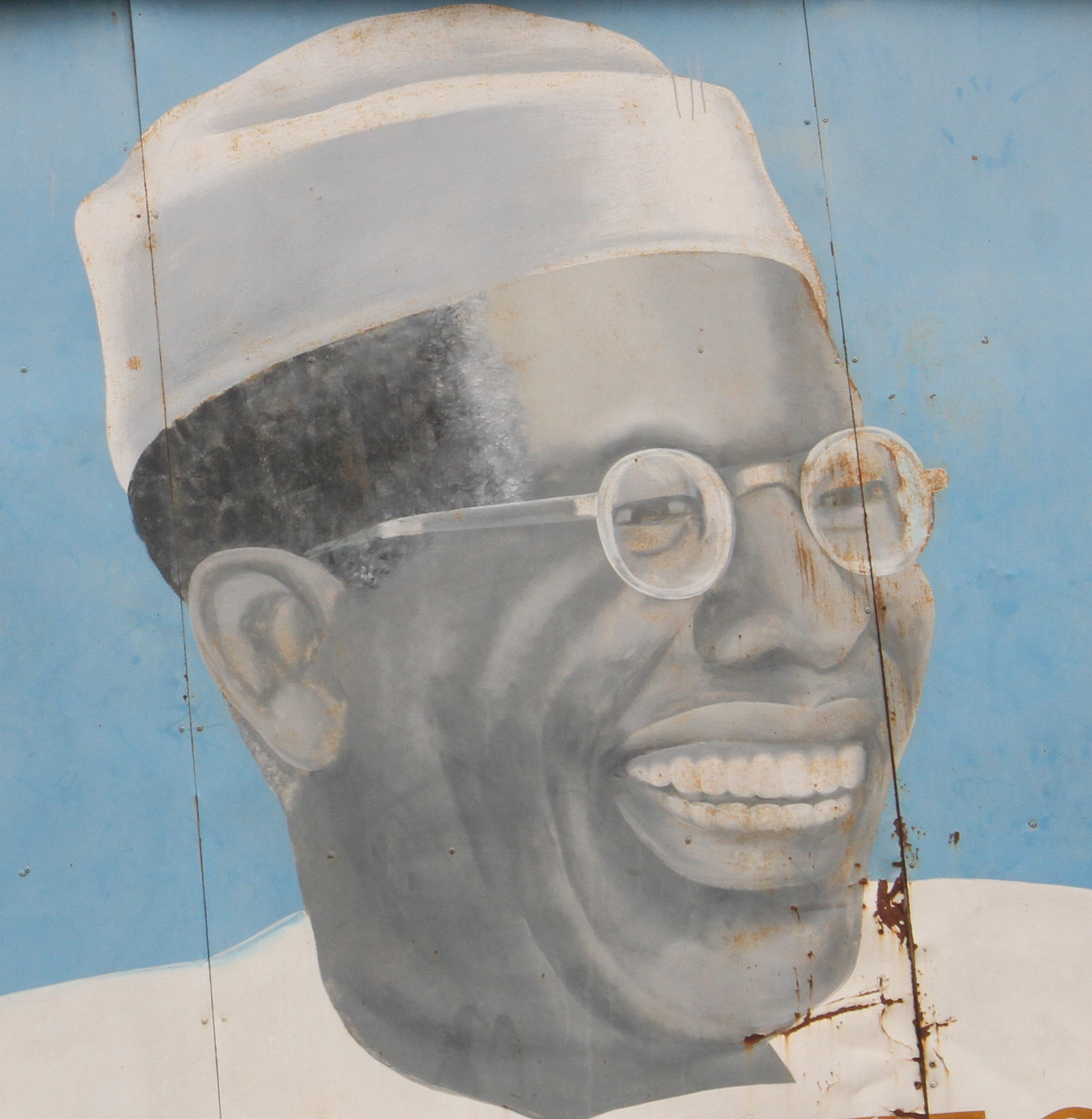

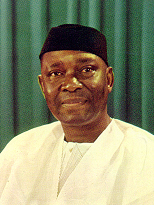
Nominee	Shehu Shagari	Obafemi Awolowo	Nnamdi Azikiwe
Party	NPN	UPN	NPP
Running mate	Alex Ekwueme	Philip Umeadi	Ishaya Audu
States carried	9	5	3
Popular vote	5,688,857	4,916,551	2,822,523
Percentage	33.77%	29.18%	16.75%
- States won by Shagari (in blue), Awolowo (in red), Azikiwe (in green), Kano (in orange) and Ibrahim (in yellow)
President before election
Olusegun Obasanjo
Elected President
Shehu Shagari
NPN

Presidential elections were held in Nigeria for the first time on 11 August 1979. The result was a victory for Shehu Shagari, whose National Party of Nigeria had won the parliamentary elections in July.

== Results ==
Candidate	Party	Votes	%
Shehu Shagari	National Party of Nigeria	5,688,857	33.77
Obafemi Awolowo	Unity Party of Nigeria	4,916,551	29.18
Nnamdi Azikiwe	Nigerian People's Party	2,822,523	16.75
Aminu Kano	People's Redemption Party	1,732,113	10.28
Waziri Ibrahim	Great Nigeria People's Party	1,686,489	10.01
Total		16,846,533	100.00
Registered voters/turnout		48,633,782	–
Source: Nohlen et al.

=== By state ===
State	Ibrahim %	Awolowo %	Shagari %	Kano %	Azikiwe %
Anambra	1.67	0.75	13.50	1.20	82.88
Bauchi	16.44	3.00	62.48	14.34	4.74
Bendel	1.20	53.20	36.20	0.70	8.60
Benue	7.97	2.57	76.38	1.35	11.77
Borno	54.04	3.35	34.71	6.52	1.35
Cross River	15.14	11.76	64.40	1.01	7.66
Gongola	34.09	21.67	35.52	4.34	4.35
Imo	3.00	0.64	8.80	0.59	84.69
Kaduna	14.00	7.00	43.00	31.00	5.00
Kano	1.54	1.23	19.94	76.41	0.91
Kwara	5.71	37.48	53.62	0.67	0.52
Lagos	0.48	82.30	7.18	0.47	9.57
Niger	16.60	3.67	74.88	3.77	1.11
Ogun	0.53	92.61	6.23	0.31	0.32
Ondo	0.26	94.50	4.19	0.18	0.86
Oyo	0.57	85.78	12.75	0.32	0.55
Plateau	6.82	5.29	34.72	3.98	49.70
Rivers	2.18	10.33	72.65	0.46	14.35
Sokoto	26.61	2.52	66.58	3.33	0.92
Source: Oyediran

== Aftermath ==
Under the 1979 constitution, in order to be elected president on the first ballot a candidate needed to receive both the most votes nationwide and at least 25% of the vote in two-thirds of the states. However, at the time of the election, Nigeria had nineteen states, two-thirds of which in exact figures is 12.66. A dispute thus ensued over whether Shehu Shagari had received the necessary threshold by winning 25% in twelve states and 20% in Kano State, which Shagari claimed was two-thirds of the required 25% threshold and represented the remaining 0.66 in the constitutional threshold. Obafemi Awolowo claimed that the threshold should be rounded up to thirteen states, which Shagari had not met. The Supreme Court of Nigeria ruled in favour of Shagari.
