= Chris Tarka =

Nigerian politician

Christopher Tarka

Chief of Staff to the Secretary to the Government of the Federation
- Incumbent
- Assumed office 7 June 2023
- Preceded by: Polycarp Shambo
- SGF: George Akume

Personal details
- Born: September 28, 1958 (age 67) Benue State
- Party: All Progressives Congress
- Relations: Simeon Tarka (brother)
- Parent: Joseph Tarka
- Occupation: politician, businessman

Christopher Tarka (born 1958) is a Nigerian politician currently serving as the Chief of Staff to the Secretary to the Government of the Federation, George Akume. He is the son of the 20th-century Nigerian politician Joseph Tarka.

== Early life and education ==
Tarka was born on September 28, 1958. His father, Joseph Tarka, was a politician and the president-general of the United Middle Belt Congress, a major political party in the Middle Belt region at the time.

For his early education, Tarka attended St. John's College and Kaduna Capital School. He initially planned to study at Ahmadu Bello University in Zaria, but due to an ongoing strike, he decided to pursue his education abroad. He completed his A-Levels at the London College of Economics and later moved to Nebraska to study Business Studies. His older brother, Simeon, was also in Nebraska during this time, completing his studies at the University of Nebraska–Lincoln.

== Political career ==
After completing his studies in Nebraska, Tarka remained in the United States for some time, running a business. He eventually returned to Nigeria following the loss of both of his parents. His return coincided with the transition to the Third Republic under the Ibrahim Babangida military regime in the early 1990s. This period was marked by intense political activity as various national groups prepared for the 1992 general elections.

Tarka eventually entered politics, continuing his father's legacy alongside his brother Simeon, who was elected into the House of Representatives in 1979. He was mentored by Shehu Musa Yar'Adua and joined Yar'Adua's People's Front, which was later absorbed into the Social Democratic Party (SDP), one of the two political parties approved by the Babangida government. However, Tarka later switched to the National Republican Convention (NRC), the other government-approved party, shortly before the elections. He contested for a seat in the Benue State House of Assembly but claimed that he was forced to step down by local party officials.

No longer contesting in the elections, Tarka served as a national delegate for the NRC's presidential congress. He was also a member of the campaign team for Yar'Adua's presidential bid. However, Yar'Adua was disqualified from running for office by the government in late 1992.

During the Fourth Republic, Tarka became closely aligned with Benue politician George Akume. He served as Special Assistant to Akume during his tenure as Minister of Special Duties and Inter-Governmental Affairs from 2019 to 2023. He was the Deputy Secretary to the Presidential Campaign Council of the All Progressives Congress for the 2023 Nigerian Presidential Election.

He is currently the Chief of Staff to the Secretary to the Government of the Federation, Akume.
