= Middle Belt Forum =

Nigerian geopolitical interest group

The Middle Belt Forum (MBF) is a regional socio-political group in Nigeria that seeks to promote the interests of the people of the Middle Belt region, a loosely defined area in the northcentral region of Nigeria. The Middle Belt has an extremely diverse population. There are over 250 ethnic groups speaking over 400 languages in Nigeria, many living in the Middle Belt. The forum serves as a voice for these minority groups. It is a successor to earlier movements, such as the United Middle Belt Congress led by Joseph Tarka.

== Rejection of northern control ==
On 9 August 2001, a delegation from the Arewa Consultative Forum (ACF), which represents the North, visited Jos, Plateau State, in the heart of the middle belt. Major General Abdullahi Shelleng invited his audience to join the ACF. However, in response governor Joshua Dariye made it clear that he was not interested in being marginalized and would prefer to remain a "middle-belter". In an interview, retired Air Commodore Jonah David Jang put the position simply: "Middle Belters are Middle Belters, and we will remain Middle Belters".

In September 2001, retired Air Commodore Dan Suleiman, former governor of Plateau State and chairman of the forum, said the middle belters are grossly marginalised and have become an endangered species on the brink of extinction and cultural annihilation. He was supported by retired General Zamani Lekwot, a former military governor of Rivers State, who attributed the failure to create a Middle Belt region in 1963 to politicians perceiving the Middle Belt as a threat.

== Regional conflict ==
In an August 2002 interview following civil unrest in the middle belt, Dan Suleiman partially blamed the far north leaders for encouraging the violence. In May 2003, Vice President Atiku Abubakar met with leaders of the MBF led by Dan Suleiman. He described the people of the region as "patriotic, supportive and selfless Nigerians who have sacrificed much more than the people of other regions in holding this country together". He cautioned the forum leaders to resist infiltrators wanting to cause disunity and instability in the country.

Following another of the recurrent crises in Plateau State, in March 2010, the President of the MBF, Pius Atta called for the name of the North-Central Zone to be replaced with Middle Belt Zone.

== Leadership and constitutional positions ==
In March 2005, leaders of the forum called for a restructuring of the zonal set-up in Nigeria from the present six zones to eight. In January 2008, a delegation from the Middle Belt Forum led by MDF president Isaac Shaahu asked former Governor Jonah Jang of Plateau State to take over the leadership of the Middle Belt Governor's Forum, a related group. In November 2009, the chairman of the forum, Wilberforce Juta, proposed a constitutional amendment where each state in Nigeria would take full control of its resources, paying a 75% tax to the Federal Government. He claimed that this federalist approach would be fairer and more efficient than the proposed 10% stake in the deregulated oil industry.

In December 2009, at a time when northern-origin President Umaru Yar'Adua was medically incapacitated, Isaac Shaahu said the Middle Belt would not support Northern attempts to force southern-origin Vice-President Goodluck Jonathan to resign, but also said he saw no reason why Yar'Adua should not continue in office although sick. However, in January 2010, Shaahu said that the problem could be solved within the constitution if Yar'Adua were to transmit a letter to the National Assembly directing them to transfer power to the Vice President.
