= 1979 Plateau State gubernatorial election =

1979 gubernatorial election in Plateau State, Nigeria

- July 28, 1979
Nominee	Solomon Lar
Party	NPP
Elected Governor
Solomon Lar
NPP

The 1979 Plateau State gubernatorial election occurred on July 28, 1979. NPP candidate Solomon Lar won the election.

== Results ==
Solomon Lar representing NPP won the election. The election held on July 28, 1979.
