= 2003 Benue State gubernatorial election =

2003 gubernatorial election in Benue State, Nigeria

- (Nigeria)
- April 19, 2003
Nominee	George Akume	Paul Unongo
Party	PDP	ANPP
Running mate	Ogiri Ajene
Popular vote	681,717
Governor before election
George Akume
PDP
Elected Governor
George Akume
PDP

The 2003 Benue State gubernatorial election occurred on April 19, 2003. Incumbent Governor, PDP's George Akume won election for a second term, defeating ANPP's Paul Unongo and two other candidates.

George Akume was the PDP nominee at the primary election. He retained Ogiri Ajene as his running mate.

== Electoral system ==
The Governor of Benue State is elected using the plurality voting system.

== Results ==
A total of four candidates registered with the Independent National Electoral Commission to contest in the election. Incumbent Governor, George Akume won election for a second term, defeating three other candidates.

The total number of registered voters in the state was 1,755,528. However, only 70.27% (i.e. 1,233,522) of registered voters participated in the exercise.

Candidate	Party	Votes	%
George Akume	People's Democratic Party (PDP)	681,717	100.00
Paul Unongo	All Nigeria Peoples Party (ANPP)		
Moses Orshio Adasu	Alliance for Democracy (AD)		
Mike Mku	United Nigeria People's Party (UNPP)		
Total		681,717	100.00
Registered voters/turnout		1,755,528	–
Source: Gamji, Africa Update, Dawodu
