= Jos Main Market =

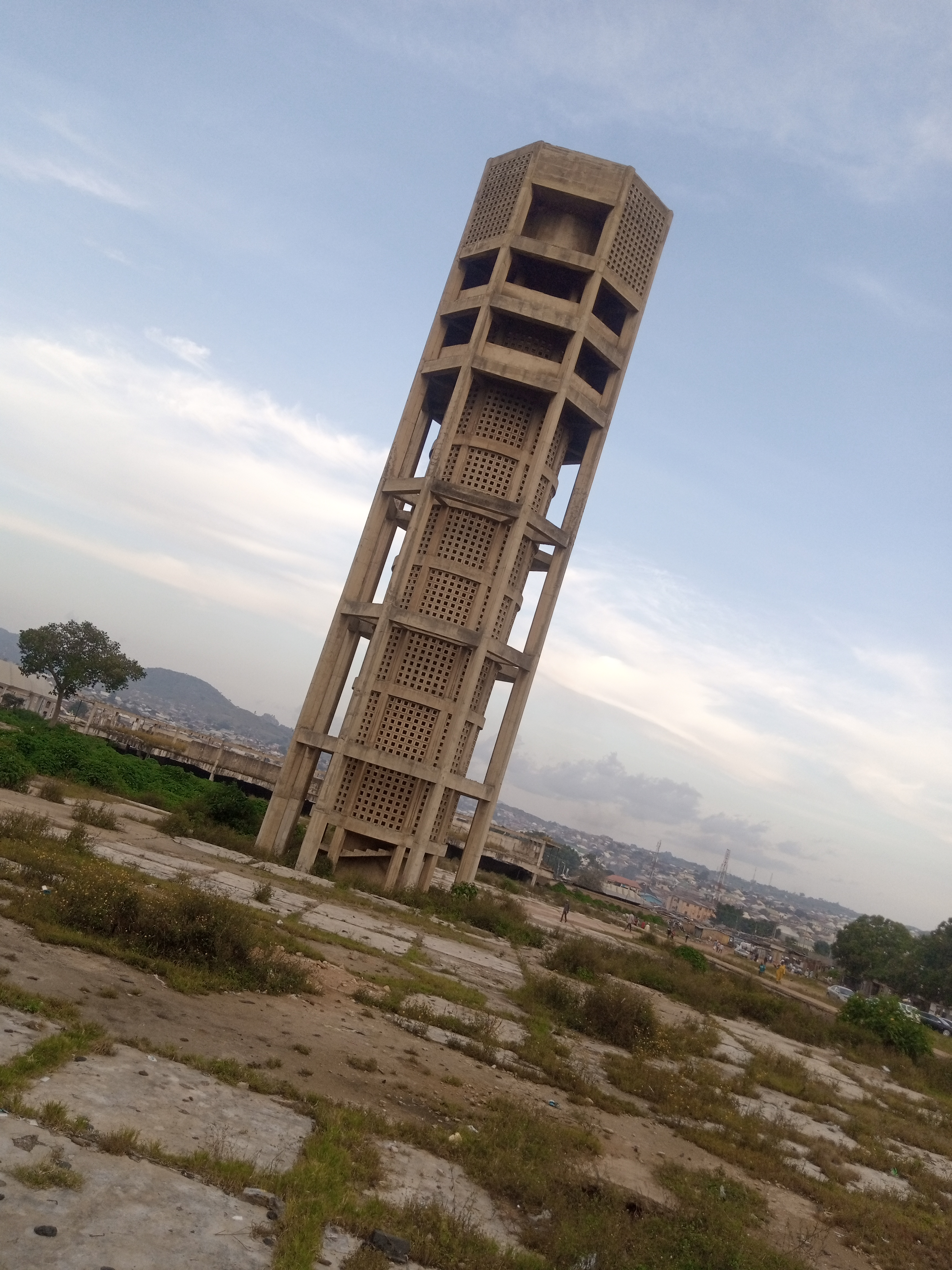
The only building left standing after the fire, pictured in 2023.

Jos Main Market, also known as Jos Terminal Market, was an ultra-modern market located in Jos, the capital of Plateau State, Nigeria. It was known to be the largest indoor market in West Africa.

Established under the first Military Governor of the old Benue-Plateau State, Joseph Gomwalk, it became the hub for the sale of all sorts of commodities including cosmetics and clothing until it was gutted by fire in 2002 by unknown persons. Attempts by past administrations to rebuild the market has proved futile.

A twin bomb blast which occurred around the market on 20 May 2014 further dragged the market to its current dilapidated state.
