= 1991 Kano State gubernatorial election =

1991 gubernatorial election in Kano State, Nigeria

- December 14, 1991
Nominee	Kabiru Ibrahim Gaya	Magaji Abdullahi
Party	NRC	SDP
Governor before election
Idris Garba
Elected Governor
Kabiru Ibrahim Gaya
NRC

The 1991 Kano State gubernatorial election occurred on December 14, 1991. National Republican Convention (NRC) candidate Kabiru Ibrahim Gaya won the election, defeating Social Democratic Party (SDP) Magaji Abdullahi.

== Conduct ==
The gubernatorial election was conducted using an open ballot system. Primaries for the two parties to select their flag bearers were conducted on October 19, 1991.
