= Dan Suleiman =

Nigerian politician (1942–2023)

Air Commodore Dan Suleiman

Governor of Plateau State
- In office March 1976 – July 1978
- Preceded by: Position established
- Succeeded by: Joshua Anaja

Personal details
- Born: 30 July 1942 Guyuk, Adamawa State, British Nigeria
- Died: 1 February 2023 (aged 80)

Military service
- Allegiance: Nigeria
- Branch/service: Nigerian Air Force
- Rank: Air Commodore

Dan Suleiman OFR (30 July 1942 – 1 February 2023) was a Nigerian Air Force officer and politician. He was a member of General Murtala Muhammed's supreme military council in Nigeria between July 1975 and March 1976, and was military governor of Plateau State from March 1976 to July 1978 after it had been created from part of the old Benue Plateau State. After the return to democracy in 1999 in the Nigerian Fourth Republic, Suleiman became chairman of the Middle Belt Forum (MBF), a socio-political group representing the people of the Middle Belt of Nigeria.

== Military career ==
Suleiman played a leading role during the Nigerian Civil War (1966–1970). He was appointed to the cabinet of General Yakubu Gowon in January 1975. As Federal Commissioner for Special Duties he was instrumental in founding the Economic Community of West African States (ECOWAS). He assisted in the military rebellion of 29 July 1975, when Gowon was deposed, replaced by General Murtala Muhammed. Following the coup, he was named a member of the Supreme Military Council. Murtala Mohammed appointed him Commissioner for Health.

Suleiman was appointed the first military governor of Plateau State in Nigeria from March 1976 to July 1978, after Benue-Plateau State was divided into Benue State and Plateau State. As governor, he made the progressive proposal that anyone born in Plateau State or anyone who had lived in the state for 20 years should enjoy all the rights and privileges of a native regardless of their ethnic origin. Suleiman retired in 1980 as an Air Commodore.

== Political career ==
Suleiman was Chairman of Allied Bank of Nigeria Plc between 1984 and 1986.

Suleiman resisted the dictatorship of General Sani Abacha after the elections of 12 June 1993 were annulled. As a result of being one of the founders of the National Democratic Coalition (NADECO), he was forced into exile. Sani Abacha died unexpectedly in June 1998. On 7 October 1998, he returned to Nigeria. Suleiman became a leader of the People's Democratic Party (PDP) in Adamawa State. The party went on to win the national elections in 1999. Suleiman also became chairman of the Middle Belt Forum. In September 2001, as chairman of the MBF he said "the middle belters are grossly marginalized and have become an endangered species on the brink of extinction and cultural annihilation".

In the 2003 PDP primaries in Delta State, he was head of the electoral panel. He joined the board of directors of Trans Nationwide Express.

As of 2006, he was Nigerian Ambassador to the Russian Federation. In June 2007, he was summoned to Russia's Foreign Ministry to discuss the kidnapping of six Russian employees of RUSAL, the world's largest aluminium producer. The workers were snatched from the company's residential compound in the Niger Delta. In June 2009, President Umaru Yar'Adua appointed him chairman of the Rubber Research Institute of Nigeria.

== Death ==
Suleiman died on 1 February 2023, at the age of 80.
