= Simeon Tarka =

Nigerian politician (1953–2019)

Member of the House of Representatives of Nigeria from Benue
- In office 9 October 1979 – October 1983
- Preceded by: position established
- Constituency: Gboko West

Personal details
- Born: Simeon Mbakorkaa Tarka; 1953
- Died: May 2019 (aged 66) Makurdi, Benue State
- Party: National Party of Nigeria (1978–1983)
- Parent: Joseph Tarka (father)
- Occupation: Politician, businessman

Simeon Tarka (1953–2019) was a Nigerian politician and statesman from Benue State. At the age of 28, he was elected to the Federal House of Representatives, serving as its youngest member from 1979 to 1983 during the Nigerian Second Republic. He was the eldest son of the influential Nigerian politician Joseph Tarka.

Tarka studied International Relations and Journalism at the University of Nebraska in Lincoln, graduating a year before his election to the National Assembly.
