= Aper Aku =

Nigerian politician

Governor of Benue State
- In office October 1979 – December 1983
- Preceded by: Adebayo Lawal
- Succeeded by: John Kpera

Personal details
- Born: 1938 Ikyobo, Ushongo LGA, Benue State, Nigeria
- Died: November 1988 (aged 49–50)

Aper Aku (1938–1988) was elected governor of Benue State, Nigeria, in October 1979 and reelected in October 1983, he left office after the military coup in December 1983 which General Mohammadu Buhari came to power.

== Background ==
Aper Aku was born in 1938 in Ikyobo, Ushongo Local Government Area, Benue State. He was of Tiv origin. He had his primary education at Aku Primary School between 1943 and 1947 and from 1948 to 1951, he attended the Senior Primary School, Mkar. He had his senior secondary education at Government College, Keffi, from 1952 to 1957, and then studied at Nigeria College of Arts and Science (later Ahmadu Bello University) from 1958 to 1961. He studied for a degree at Fourah Bay University, Sierra Leone (1961–1964). He became a teacher in 1964 at William Bristow Secondary School, Gboko, and later taught at Bauchi Provincial Secondary School and Government Secondary School, Gombe. He attended Ahmadu Bello University, Zaria (1965–1966) for a post-graduate Course in Education. In 1968 he joined the Federal Government and worked with External Aid for Education and the Federal Ministry of Establishment. He was Principal of the Federal Training Centre, Kaduna (1970–1972) and a member of the Governing Council of the University of Ibadan (1972–1976).

In May 1974 and again in August 1974 Aku wrote to Joseph Dechi Gomwalk, Governor of Benue-Plateau State, accusing him of nepotism and financial wrongdoings, and filed affidavits to this effect. General Yakubu Gowon dismissed the allegations at the time and ordered Aku's detention. However, a probe initiated by Gowon's successor Murtala Mohammed vindicated Aku, saying that the allegations were true.

== Political career ==
Aper Aku was appointed as Chairman of Kwande Local Government Council in 1977 by Abdullahi Shelleng, Benue state governor. He presided over a hostile council because the councillors belonged to different factions; some councillors where loyal to Joseph Tarka, Akus mentor and some were loyal to Paul Unongo, a leader of another political camp. However, his administration was perceived as honest and effective. Aku resigned as chairman of the local council in 1978 and subsequently entered the Benue State primary race for governor under the banner of the National Party of Nigeria (NPN). He won the NPN primary over challengers such as Isaac Shaahu and George Atedze. In 1979, he went on to become the elected Governor of Benue State and was re-elected in 1983.

Aku faced severe problems as governor in a state with a long history of neglect, particularly in the southern area which was inhabited by minority groups. However, the state has fertile land and plentiful rainfall, with great agricultural potential. Aku encouraged mass agricultural production, and during his tenure the state produced bumper harvests of local crops such as yams, cassava, soya beans, cowpea, maize, guinea corn, millet, groundnut, banana, mangoes and oranges. The Government established a number of industries to produce fertilizer and process agricultural products, located close to the areas where the produce was grown. Aku launched commercial enterprises such as the Benue Brewery, Benro Packaging, Benue Bottling Company, Lobi Bank, Ber-Agbum Fish Farm, Ikogen Cattle Ranch, Taraku Vegetable Processing Industry and Benue International Hotel in Makurdi. He initiated the Makurdi International Market and planned to establish a flour mill in Makurdi. Aku also built a state of the art State Secretariat

He cancelled work on a large medical centre at Apir and instead began construction of seven cottage hospitals in different locations. He established two Teachers Colleges at Oju and Makurdi and the University of Technology in Makurdi. He embarked on an ambitious program to expand the number of Secondary Schools. He built roads in Makurdi township and provided the street lights, awarded the contract for the Art Council Complex and started work on the Makurdi stadium.

== Last years ==
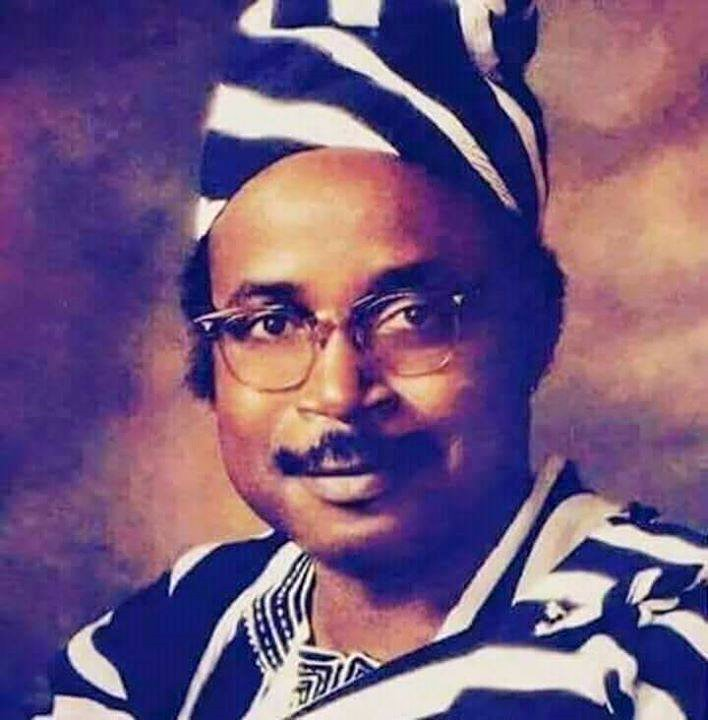
Dressed in traditional Tiv attire

On 31 December 1983 General Muhammadu Buhari took power in a coup, and replaced the civilian governors with military officers. When Aku was removed from office the state's finances were severely overdrawn. Many of the projects he had begun were later abandoned by the later military governors, and agricultural production plunged. The elaborate water supply schemes that Aku had initiated was abandoned, and the infrastructure that had been built was not maintained. To this day, the Late Governor Aper Aku is regarded as the best governor to ever govern Benue State. Professor David Iornem once referred to him as a visionary leader ahead of his time.

Buhari jailed Aku and most of the other Governors, setting up military tribunals to investigate their conduct while in office. Aku's health was broken by the harsh conditions in jail, and he died in 1988 shortly after being released. Aku left two wives and four children. At a 2008 press conference to mark the anniversary of his death, the People's Democratic Party (PDP) leader in the state noted that 70% of important projects in Benue State today were started or completed during the four years of the Aku administration.
