= 1992 Nigerian Senate elections in Kano State =

1992 Nigerian Senate election in Kano State

The 1992 Nigerian Senate election in Kano State was held on July 4, 1992, to elect members of the Nigerian Senate to represent Kano State. Aminu Inuwa representing Kano Central and Magaji Abdullahi representing Kano North won on the platform of Social Democratic Party, while Isa Kachako representing Kano South won on the platform of the National Republican Convention.

== Overview ==
Affiliation	Party		Total
Affiliation	SDP	NRC	Total
Before Election			3
After Election	2	1	3

== Summary ==
District	Incumbent	Party	Elected Senator	Party
Kano Central			Aminu Inuwa	SDP
Kano North			Magaji Abdullahi	SDP
Kano South			Isa Kachako	NRC

== Results ==
=== Kano Central ===
The election was won by Aminu Inuwa of the Social Democratic Party.

1992 Nigerian Senate election in Kano State
Party	Candidate	Votes	%
SDP	Aminu Inuwa		
Total votes			
SDP hold			

=== Kano North ===
The election was won by Magaji Abdullahi of the Social Democratic Party.

1992 Nigerian Senate election in Kano State
Party	Candidate	Votes	%
SDP	Magaji Abdullahi		
Total votes			
SDP hold			

=== Kano South ===
The election was won by Isa Kachako of the National Republican Convention.

1992 Nigerian Senate election in Kano State
Party	Candidate	Votes	%
NRC	Isa Kachako		
Total votes			
NRC hold			
