= Fidelis Makka =

Nigerian politician and army officer (born 1950)

Military Governor of Benue State
- In office 21 Jul 1988 – 2 Jan 1992
- Preceded by: Idris Garba
- Succeeded by: Moses Adasu

Personal details
- Born: December 20, 1950 (age 75) Gawu, Suleja LGA, Niger State, Nigeria

Lt. Colonel Fidelis Makka (born 20 December 1950) was Military Governor of Benue State, Nigeria from 21 July 1988 to 2 January 1992 during the military regime of General Ibrahim Babangida.

== Background ==
Fidelis Makka was born on 20 December 1950 in Gawu, Suleja, Niger State. On 4 January 1971, he enlisted as a reader officer at the Nigerian Defence Academy, Kaduna, and on 23 June 1973 he was granted regular combatant commission. He served in the United Nations Interim Force in Lebanon from May to November 1976. He attended the Senior Staff Course at the Armed Forces Command and Staff College, Jaji from September 1981 to June 1982. Other posts were Commander 142 Infantry Battalion, Nigerian Army in 1978 and Staff Officer at the Military Secretary's Office, Army Headquarters. Makka was the Deputy Defence Adviser to the Nigerian Embassy in the Republic of Cameroon before being appointed Governor of Benue State.

== Governor of Benue State ==
General Ibrahim Babangida appointed Lt. Colonel Fidelis Makka as Military Governor of Benue State on 21 July 1988, a post he held until 2 January 1992. He was an energetic and determined administrator committed to transparency of government. He systematically completed abandoned projects that the Aper Aku civilian administration had started. He re-designed and completed the Aper Aku Stadium, built the IBB Square, Fidelis Makka Library and Pauline Makka Women's Centre, and completed six general hospitals. He repaired roads, rehabilitated water works, and extended rural electrification. He established Benue State University by edict in 1991. He forced the people to clean their environment under the supervision of soldiers in monthly environmental sanitation exercises that later became institutionalized.
