= Muhammadu Abdullahi Wase =

Military Administrator of Kano
- In office December 1993 – 20 June 1996
- Preceded by: Kabiru Ibrahim Gaya
- Succeeded by: Dominic Oneya

Personal details
- Born: 1948 Wase, Northern Region, British Nigeria (now Wase, Nigeria)
- Died: June 20, 1996 (aged 47-48)
- Cause of death: Plane crash
- Education: Junior Primary School, Wase; Senior Primary School, Pankshin; Toro Teachers College

Colonel Muhammadu Abdullahi Wase (1948–20 June 1996) was a Nigerian military administrator. He was appointed by General Sani Abacha in December 1993 administering Kano State in Northern Nigeria from December 1993 to June 1996.

He attended Junior Primary School, Wase and Senior Primary School, Pankshin before enrolling into Toro Teachers College.

In June 1995, Colonel Wase said that Nigerians, more than ever before, required adequate positive enlightenment on the activities of government, and that media houses should shun irresponsible journalism, which tended to cause dissent.

He died in a plane crash in Jos on 20 June 1996.
