= David Obadiah Lot =

Nigerian politician (1907–1995)

David Lot
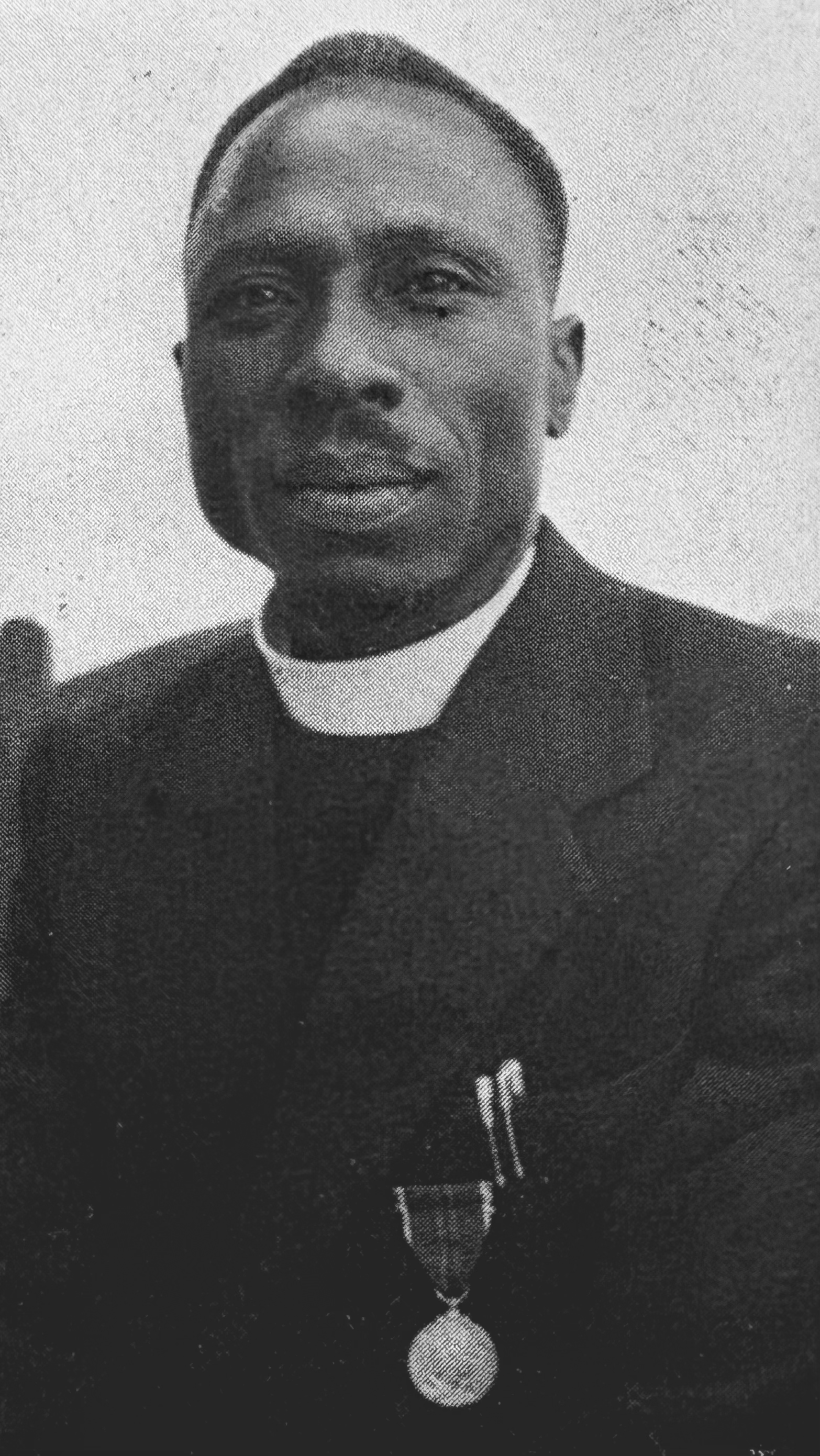
- Taken in 1955

Member of the House of Representative
- In office 1951–1955
- Constituency: Panyam/ Pankshin

Minister without Portfolio
- In office 1955–1956

Personal details
- Born: 1907
- Died: 1995 (aged 87–88)
- Party: United Middle Belt Congress
- Occupation: Pastor

David Obadiah Vrengkat Lot MBE (1907–1995) was a Nigerian religious leader of the Church of Christ denomination and a politician from the Middle Belt region of Nigeria. He was an early leader of the middle belt political movement in the 1940s. The movement among other things desired the creation of a separate state for inhabitants of the region.

== Early life ==
David Lot was born in 1907 to the family of Daniel Lot, a Christian evangelist. He was raised in the Christian faith and attended a missionary primary school in his district of Panyam. From there, he was trained and mentored by missionaries in the district. In 1926, courtesy of Miss Webster, his mentor he went to St Bartholomew's School, Zaria, a missionary boarding school founded by Walter Miller. After completing his studies, he turned to the teaching profession as an early vocation.

== Career ==
He started his teaching job at a small primary school in Panyam and got married later. In 1939, a need arose for a pastor from the Panyam district. David was nominated and sent to a training school for pastors in Gindiri and soon thereafter became an ordained minister.

David Lot joined the political scene in the 1940s. He was interested in ways of improving the social and political lot of Christians in the middle belt region and to protect them from the dominant Islamic Hausa–Fulani group. In 1946, he was among a team of Nigerians who traveled to London to attend a constitutional conference. In 1950, he was a founding member and leader of the Middle Zone League (MZL) and a year later contested and won a seat to the House of Representative. However, by 1955, the league was looking for ways to re-invent itself and consolidate with other like minded organizations from the region. The League later merged with another middle belt party to form the United Middle Belt Congress However, an agreement by Lot to join forces with the Northern Peoples Party was opposed by a section of the newly formed party. The opposition to the move was led by Joseph Tarka a much younger politician from Tiv land. He later left politics to concentrate on the Ministry of Christ.
