= Mike Mku =

Nigerian politician and businessman

- Born: 26 June 1951 (age 75); Gboko, Nigeria
- Education: Mount St Michael Secondary School, Aliade
- Alma mater: University of Jos; Ahmadu Bello University
- Occupations: Politician, Businessman
- Spouse: Elizabeth Terseer Mku
- Children: 3
- Website: http://mikemku.com

Michael Ornguga Mku (born 26 June 1951), better known by the mononym "Mike" or "Mike Mku" is a Nigerian Politician, Businessman and Philanthropist from Gboko, Benue State in central Nigeria. He is the son of Late Chief Aul Mku, who was the District Head of Yandev-South, from Yandev - a suburb of Gboko town in the North-West province of Benue State.

Mku ran as the flagbearer of The People's Democratic Party (PDP) for the Benue North-West Senatorial District, otherwise known as "Zone B" where he sought to represent the District at the Nigerian Senate in the 2015 General Elections, but lost to George Akume for the fifth consecutive time under sad circumstances.

== Early life ==
Mku was born at Yandev district of Gboko Local Government Area in Benue State. He had elementary education at St Peter's Primary School, Mbayion, Gboko before proceeding to Mt St Michael's Secondary School, Aliade between 1967 and 1973. He studied at the University of Jos and later Ahmadu Bello University(ABU), earning a degree and Post Graduate Diplomas in Management and Education respectively.

== Political career ==
He took to politics in 1979 at the age of 28 under the tutelage of his political mentor – the first Governor of Benue State, Apollos Aper Aku. In 1983, he contested and won elections as a member in the Benue State House of Assembly under the platform of the then ruling National People's Party (NPN) where he was the House Committee Chairman on Finance and Appropriations. His job as a lawmaker was interrupted after three months when the military on 31 December 1983 seized power and suspended all political activities, a situation which made him take appointment at the Benue Cement Company (BCC).

During the 1998 political transition of General Abdulsalami Abubakar, Mku ran as a favourite for the office of the Governor of Benue State on the platform of the Peoples Democratic Party, (PDP) and came second in the primaries, despite being the most popular candidate in the 1999 General Elections. He went on to support the winner, George Akume who later became the governor. His second contest for the office of the Governor was in 2003 General Elections on the platform of the United Nigeria People's Party(UNPP). He won the Party’s primaries among strong contenders like Sen. Prof. Daniel Saror, Gen. Lawrence Onoja, Engr. Peter Abwa and Hon. Terwase Orbunde and became the party’s standard flag bearer. As the party's Flag Bearer, he fought the fiercest battle to unseat the incumbent and almost succeeded but eventually lost. Mku attributed his lack of success for the second time to a conspiracy among party members and quoted Alhaji Abubakar (aka Young Alhaji) as saying: "Mike Mku, those that never wanted you to be governor in 1999 have done it again. They are: Chief Barnabas Gemade, Sen. Joseph Waku, Chief Joseph Akaagerger, Gen. Geoffrey Ejiga, Late S.J.I. Akure, Hon. Ada Ejiga, the guber running mate". In 2007, against all odds, Mku made an appearance for the senate ticket of Zone "B" but the instrumentality of the incumbent government at the time worked against him. He also suffered defeat at the senate primaries in 2011, under similar circumstances. He however served as Senior Special Assistant to former President Olusegun Obasanjo on Human trafficking and Child labour during the former President's tenure.

On 23 April 2013, President Goodluck Jonathan appointed Mku alongside 67 others to serve as Chairmen for 67 Parastatals in Nigeria, with Mku in charge of The Niger Delta River Basin Development Authority.

As a campaign strategy, Mku, on 8 January 2015, released an online video in which he wishes his supporters a happy New Year and encourages the people of his constituency to vote for him, revealing his intended plans for the constituency when finally elected.

Mku later served as the Chairman of Board of Trustees at Benue Investment and Property Company Limited, BIPC from 2019 to June 2023.

== Community service ==
Mku contributed to the electrification of his community when he donated 2 transformers to the local community of Kyado and Genyi-Yandev, a suburb of Gboko town. He established an industry called Rock Field Ltd at Tarukpe market where young people of the community work various jobs to earn their living. He has also sponsored over 250 students in tertiary institutions across the country. In the wake of the Covid-19 pandemic, Mku distributed bags of rice, beans and semovita to Gboko women to help them wade through the hardship the pandemic brought upon the people.

== Personal life ==
Chief Mku has a wife called Terseer Mku with whom he has three children. He is a devoted Christian and professes his faith as a Catholic. He plays soccer, tennis and enjoys travelling. He resides in Abuja, Nigeria.
