= Joshua Anaja =

Nigerian politician and army officer

Brigadier General Joshua Umaru Anaja

Governor of Plateau State
- In office July 1978 – October 1979
- Preceded by: Dan Suleiman
- Succeeded by: Solomon Lar

Military service
- Allegiance: Nigeria
- Branch/service: Nigerian Army
- Rank: Brigadier General

Joshua Umaru Anaja was the military governor of Plateau State, Nigeria from July 1978 to October 1979 during the military regime of General Olusegun Obasanjo. On 1 October 1979, he handed over the governorship to the elected civilian governor Solomon Lar, who assured him that his government would inherit any realistic obligations made by the out-going military government. Promoted to Brigadier, Anaja was Director of the Department of Joint Studies at the Armed Forces Command and Staff College, Jaji from 1 February 1984 to 25 May 1985.
