= Joshua Obademi =

Nigerian politician and air force officer

Administrator of Benue State
- In office 9 Dec 1993 – 14 Aug 1996
- Preceded by: Moses Orshio Adasu
- Succeeded by: Aminu Isa Kontagora

Personal details
- Born: March 31, 1951 (age 75) Ikaramu, Akoko North-East LGA, Ondo State, Nigeria

Group Captain Joshua Obademi (born 31 March 1951) was Administrator of Benue State, Nigeria from December 1993 to August 1996 during the military regime of General Sani Abacha.

Obademi was born on March 31, 1951, at Ikaramu in Akoko North-East Local Government Area of Ondo State. He attended St. Andrew's Senior Primary School Okene in present-day Kogi State in 1964 and the African Church Secondary Modern School at Ikare, then enlisted in the Nigerian Military School, Zaria, graduating in 1969. He then attended the Nigeria Defence Academy, Kaduna before becoming a pilot officer with the Nigerian Air Force (NAF) in 1972.

Appointments included Officer Commanding Armament Squadron, Central Logistics Wing, Lagos (July 1976 - March 1978); Officer Commanding Armament Sub-Depot, NAF Station, Kaduna (1981–1982); Staff Officer (Works) Nigeria Airforce Headquarters (1983–1985); Staff Officer (Armament) Nigeria Airforce Headquarters (1985–1987); Commander, Central Armament Depot, Makurdi (1987–1990); Director of Armament, Nigeria Airforce Headquarters (April 1990 - 1993). In January 1993, he was posted to the Defence Industries Corporation. Kaduna as Director of Production. In October, 1993 he was posted back to NAF Headquarters Lagos as Director of Armament.

General Sani Abacha appointed Obademi as Military Administrator of Benue State in North-Central Nigeria on December 9, 1993, a post he held until 14 Aug 1996. During his administration, there were outbreaks of religious violence. He stated concern that the activities of fanatics posed a serious threat to security and development, and said "workable strategies" had been put in place to curb further religious unrest. He promoted functional literacy for women in the state, as a means to improve health and economic development.

== See also ==
- List of governors of Benue State
