= Solomon Lar =

Nigerian politician (1933–2013)

Solomon Daushep Lar

Member of the Federal Parliament
- In office January 1960 – January 1966
- Constituency: Lowland East

Governor of Plateau State
- In office 1 October 1979 – 31 December 1983
- Preceded by: Joshua Anaja
- Succeeded by: Samuel Atukum

Minister of Police Affairs
- In office November 1993 – 1994

National Chairman of People's Democratic Party
- In office 1998–2002
- Preceded by: Position established
- Succeeded by: Barnabas Gemade

Personal details
- Born: 4 April 1933 Langtang, Northern Region, British Nigeria (now in Plateau State, Nigeria)
- Died: 9 October 2013 (aged 80) United States
- Spouse(s): Prof. Mary Lar; eldest daughter, Dr. Chalya Lar

Chief (Dr.) Solomon Daushep Lar (4 April 1933 – 9 October 2013) (Walin Langtang) was a Nigerian politician who has held various offices at the National level for over 50 years. He was a member of the first national parliament when Nigeria gained independence in 1960. He was elected governor of Plateau State on the Nigerian People's Party (NPP) platform during the Nigerian Second Republic, holding office from October 1979 until the Military coup of 31 December 1983 that brought General Muhammadu Buhari to power. Later, he was founding chairman of the People's Democratic Party (PDP).

== Birth and early career ==
Lar was born in Pangna, Langtang, Plateau State in April 1933. His father was a farmer and his mother a pottery maker. He studied at the Sudan United Mission Primary School in Langtang, and then at the Gindiri Teachers College where he qualified to teach at the Primary School, Langtang. After two years he returned to Gindiri for his Senior Teacher's Training Programme, earned his Higher Elementary Certificate and started to teach at the Senior Primary School level. He planned to become a clergyman.

Lar was elected as a councilor to the Langtang Natives Authority in January 1959. On 12 December 1959 he was elected to the Federal Parliament on the platform of United Middle Belt Congress (UMBC). He was reelected in 1964, and from then until 15 January 1966, when General Yakubu Gowon took power in a coup, Lar was parliamentary secretary to Prime Minister Abubakar Tafawa Balewa. He was also a Junior Minister in the Federal Ministry of establishments.

After the fall of the democratic government, Lar attended Ahmadu Bello University, Zaria, graduating in 1970 with an LLB and being called to the bar in 1971. He established a private legal practice, and was co-founder and first national secretary of the Nigerian Legal Aid Association.

In 1972, Lar joined the board of Amalgamated Tin Mines of Nigeria. He became chairman of the board of directors of African Continental Bank, member of the Nigeria Council of Legal Education and a member of the Constituent Assembly (1977–1978). He was vice-chairman of the panel chaired by Justice Ayo Irikefe that recommended expanding from 12 to 19 states during the regime of generals Murtala Muhammed and Olusegun Obasanjo. Lar was also a board member of the US-based World Environmental Movement for Africa.

== Second and Third Republics ==
At the start of the Second Republic, Lar was a co-founder of the Nigerian People's Party. He was nominated as the party's presidential candidate in 1978, and later won the governorship election in Plateau State as the first Executive Governor on 1 October 1979. His deputy was Alhaji Aliyu Akwe Doma. He was active in building infrastructure in the state including hospitals, educational institutions, rural electrification, water supplies, and roads. He introduced reforms to state employment laws, abolishing the daily pay and contract systems and introducing paid maternity leave for nursing mothers.

After the military coup in December 1983, General Muhammadu Buhari set up military tribunals which tried all former governors. Although Lar was not found guilty of embezzlement or misappropriation, he was sentenced to 88 years in prison, first in Jos and then in Kirikiri in Lagos. His case was reviewed and he was released by the regime of General Ibrahim Babangida, who started another transition to democracy in 1992.

During the Nigerian Third Republic, Lar was a supporter of the Social Democratic Party (SDP). He was appointed Minister of Police Affairs by the government of General Sani Abacha, later resigning when he realized Abacha was not serious about restoring democracy.

== Fourth Republic ==
In the transition to the Nigerian Fourth Republic Lar became the first National Chairman of People's Democratic Party (PDP) in 1998, holding this position until 2002 when he handed over to Chief Barnabas Gemade. In February 2004 he resigned as chairman of the PDP Board of Trustees, handing over to Chief Tony Anenih at a caucus in Abuja. He remained a power in the PDP until 2005, when he supported Vice President Atiku Abubakar in his falling out with President Olusegun Obasanjo, and later supported Atiku's bid for the Presidency in 2007. In April 2006, Lar also welcomed the decision of former Military President, General Ibrahim Babangida to compete for president in the 2007 elections, saying that in a democracy anyone was entitled to run.

Lar has been described as an ardent Middle-Belter, an active participant in the Middle Belt Forum. In Plateau State he championed a policy based on the idea that the state should help indigenes realize the benefits of their "emancipation" from Hausa domination, and that the centuries-old Hausa and Jarawa communities in Jos and Yelwa should be relegated to non-indigene status. In an interview in February 2009 he said that the Middle Belt was being neglected despite the great contributions it made to national unity, a reference to sacrifices in the Nigerian Civil War. He also complained of discrimination against Christians in the North, to the extent that they could not get land to build a church.

In February 2010 Vice President Goodluck Jonathan appointed him Chairman of the Presidential committee tasked with recommending how to prevent further violence in Jos, the capital of Plateau State.

== Death ==
On 9 October 2013, Plateau state governor Jonah David Jang announced the death of Mr Lar. He died at an American hospital after a long illness, aged 80.
