= 1983 Nigerian parliamentary election =

Parliamentary elections were held in Nigeria in August 1983. The Senate was elected on 20 August and the House of Representatives on 27 August. The result was a victory for the ruling National Party of Nigeria, which won 60 of the 96 Senate seats and 306 of the 450 House seats.

== Results ==
=== Senate ===
Party	Seats	+/–
National Party of Nigeria	60	+24
Unity Party of Nigeria	16	−12
Nigerian People's Party	12	−4
People's Redemption Party	5	−2
Great Nigeria People's Party	2	−6
Vacant	1	–
Total	96	+1
Source: IPU

=== House of Representatives ===
Party	Seats	+/–
National Party of Nigeria	306	+138
Unity Party of Nigeria	51	−60
Nigerian People's Party	48	−30
People's Redemption Party	41	−8
Great Nigeria People's Party	0	−43
Vacant	4	–
Total	450	+1
Source: IPU
