= Adebayo Lawal =

Nigerian politician and Air Force officer (1941–2024)

Adebayo Hamed Lawal

Military Governor of Benue State
- In office July 1978 – 1 October 1979
- Preceded by: Abdullahi Shelleng
- Succeeded by: Aper Aku

Personal details
- Born: 14 September 1941 Offa, Colony and Protectorate of Nigeria
- Died: 23 June 2024 (aged 82)

Group Captain Adebayo Hamed Lawal (14 September 1941 – 23 June 2024) was Governor of Benue State, Nigeria from July 1978 to October 1979 during the military regime of General Olusegun Obasanjo.

Adebayo Hamed Lawal was born in Offa, in present-day Kwara State. He attended Government College, Ibadan (1955–1962). He enlisted in the Nigerian Airforce in 1963 and was trained as a Military Pilot in West Germany, graduating in 1964. Postings included Commander, Port Harcourt Base (1969–1970), Commander Kano Base (1972–1973) and (1975–1977) and Commander, Makurdi Base (1977–1978).

He was appointed Military Governor of Benue State in July 1978, holding the position until October 1979. He oversaw the peaceful transition from military rule to civil rule, handing over power to the National Party of Nigeria candidate Aper Aku on 1 October 1979.

Lawal died on 23 June 2024, at the age of 83.
