= Aminu Isa Kontagora =

Nigerian politician (1956–2021)

Colonel Aminu Isa Kontagora

Governor of Kano State
- In office September 1998 – 29 May 1999
- Preceded by: Dominic Oneya
- Succeeded by: Rabiu Musa Kwankwaso

Governor of Benue State
- In office 14 August 1996 – August 1998
- Preceded by: Joshua O. Obademi
- Succeeded by: Dominic Oneya

Personal details
- Born: 20 April 1956
- Died: 10 January 2021 (aged 64)
- Party: People's Democratic Party

Military service
- Allegiance: Nigeria
- Branch: Nigerian Army
- Rank: Colonel

Aminu Isa Kontagora (20 April 1956 – 10 January 2021) was a Nigerian politician who served as the governor of Benue State, Nigeria, from August 1996 to August 1998 during the military regime of General Sani Abacha, then Governor of Kano State from September 1998 to May 1999 during the transitional regime of General Abdulsalami Abubakar, handing over power to the elected executive governor Rabiu Musa Kwankwaso on 29 May 1999.

== Biography ==
In 1998, Kontagora commissioned a primary health center in Kunchi town, Kano State, but as of December 2006 it was lying neglected without staff or equipment.

Kontagora remained active in public life after retiring from the army. In April 2001, he was a member of the steering committee of the Kaduna-based United Nigeria Development Forum. In January 2003, he was reported to be supporting the presidential bid of former military ruler Major-General Muhammadu Buhari. He was said to support another former military ruler, General Ibrahim Badamosi Babangida, as presidential candidate in 2007.

In March 2005, he urged financial institutions to provide special services to assist small-scale businesses.

In June 2009, President Umaru Yar'Adua named him as a member of the board of The National Veterinary Research Institute.

In September 2009, Aminu Isa Kontagora was named chairman of the Niger State Elders Committee of the People's Democratic Party.

== Death ==
Kontagora died on 10 January 2021, following complications from COVID-19 during the COVID-19 pandemic in Nigeria.

== See also ==
- List of governors of Benue State
