= Idris Garba =

Nigerian politician and army officer

Major General Idris Garba

Governor of Kano State
- In office August 1988 – January 1992
- Preceded by: Mohammed Ndatsu Umaru
- Succeeded by: Kabiru Ibrahim Gaya

Governor of Benue State
- In office 1987–1988
- Preceded by: Ishaya Bakut
- Succeeded by: Fidelis Makka

Personal details
- Born: 6 July 1947 (age 79) Lapai, Northern Region, British Nigeria (now Lapai, Nigeria)
- Education: Nigerian Defence Academy

Military service
- Allegiance: Nigeria
- Branch/service: Nigerian Army
- Years of service: 1968–1992
- Rank: Major General
- Battles/wars: Nigerian Civil War

Idris Garba was the Military Governor of Benue State from 1987 to 1988 and Governor of Kano State from 1989 to 1992.

== Background ==
Idris Garba was born in July 1947 in Gulu, Lapai Local Government Area (LGA) of Niger State, Nigeria. He had a secondary education in the Nigerian Military School, Zaria 1963 - 1967.

== Military training ==
He entered the Nigerian Defence Academy, Kaduna, and was commissioned as a second lieutenant in 1968. He attended the following courses:

- Artillery Troop Commanders Course USSR, July 1970 - September 1971
- Young Officers Course Nowshera, Pakistan, July - December, 1972
- Technical Gunnery Course Larkhill, Salisbury, UK, May - August, 1975.
- Field Artillery Officers Advanced Course, Fort Sill, Oklahoma, USA June 1977 to February 1978;
- Command and Staff College, Jaji August 1978 to September, 1979
- Regiment Battalion Commanders Course, Nigerian Army School of Infantry, Jaji in 1981.

== Military command ==
His commands were:

- Troop Commander, second Field Artillery Regiment, Onitsha, (November, 1968 to September 1969)
- Commanding Officer, second Field Artillery Regent (Rear) Ibadan (September 1969 to July 1970)
- Battalion Commander, Oyo (September 1971 to October 1973)
- Instructor/Chief Instructor Nigerian Army School of Artillery (Kaduna 1974 to August 1976)
- Commanding Officer, Commander, Heavy Artillery Regiment (September 1976 to April 1980)
- Company Commander 82 Infantry Battalion United Nations Interim Force in Lebanon, Lebanon (May to December 1980)
- Commanding Officer, 342 Support Regiment, Zaria (1981 to 1983)
- Deputy Defence Adviser, Nigerian Embassy, Moscow (1983 to 1986)
- Commander Officer, Short Service Course NDA Kaduna (1986 to 1988)

== Military governor ==
In 1988, General Ibrahim Babangida appointed him Military Governor of Benue State. He was then appointed governor of Kano State in August 1988, serving until 1992 when he hand-over to civilian Kabiru Ibrahim Gaya in the build up to the Nigerian Third Republic. Col. Idris Garba enacted an edict which repealed previous laws and vested the Kano State Sports Council with the responsibilities of promoting and developing sports in the state.
