= Nigeria Advance Party =

Nigerian political party

The Nigeria Advance Party was a progressive political party during the Second Nigerian Republic, registered for the 1983 elections. Founded by lawyer Tunji Braithwaite, known for his opposition and as a lawyer, the party was the only new political organization allowed to field candidates for the 1983 elections. The party was composed of southern Nigerian intellectuals favoring a reformist government.

== History ==
The party was launched on 13 October 1978 in Ibadan. Party leaders initially took a cautious attitude towards the idea of free education, but later advocated free university education and mandatory primary education. It positioned itself as an alternative to the old politicians of the first republic.

In its first two decades, Nigeria witnessed extensive military rule. Gen. Olusegun Obasanjo was the last military head of state prior to the 1983 elections. Tunji Braithwaite was a prominent Lagosian who claimed that Nigeria's potential could be achieved by reform—especially through the eradication of deep-rooted corruption. Notable associates of Tunji Braithwaite include Wole Soyinka, Nobel Literature Prize Winner, and musician Fela Anikulapo Kuti, whose mother was murdered by soldiers in a raid on Fela's Kalakuta Republic under Obasanjo's Military Regime.

== Campaign ==
In December 1978, three political pressure groups joined the party. They were the Nigeria Tenants and Labour Congress, headed by I.H. Igali, the Nigeria Social Democratic Congress, led by Balali Dauda, and the Youth Force Alliance, led by Olayinka Olabiwonu. However, its registration was rejected two months later based on insufficient grassroots support.

=== 1983 Elections ===
The party, led by Tunji Braithwaite, was one of six to contest in the Nigerian Presidential Elections of 1983. Shehu Shagari of the National Party of Nigeria was elected President, with a plurality of 45% of votes.

On 7 December 2012, the party was one of 28 to be de-registered by INEC, ahead of 2015 election campaign.
