= 1979 Nigerian parliamentary election =

Parliamentary elections were held in Nigeria on 7 July 1979 for the first time since 1964 to elect a Senate and House of Representatives on 14 July. The result was a victory for the National Party of Nigeria, which won 36 of the 95 Senate seats and 168 of the 449 House seats. It formed a coalition with the Nigerian People's Party in order to gain a majority. Voter turnout was just 30.7% in the House election.

== Electoral system ==
Members of both houses were elected using the single-member plurality electoral system. Each State was divided into five districts, each of which elected a Senator. Each State was also allocated a number of seats in the House of Representatives based on its proportion of the population.

== Results ==
=== Senate ===
Party	Votes	%	Seats
National Party of Nigeria	4,032,329	32.75	36
Unity Party of Nigeria	2,835,362	23.03	28
Nigerian People's Party	2,145,859	17.43	16
Great Nigeria People's Party	1,847,019	15.00	8
People's Redemption Party	1,453,538	11.80	7
Total	12,314,107	100.00	95
Total votes	12,532,195	–	
Registered voters/turnout	48,633,782	25.77	
Source: Nohlen et al.

==== Results by state ====
State	NPN	UPN	NPP	GNPP	PRP
Anambra	0	0	5	0	0
Bauchi	5	0	0	0	0
Bendel	1	4	0	0	0
Benue	5	0	0	0	0
Borno	1	0	0	4	0
Cross River	3	0	0	2	0
Gongola	1	2	0	2	0
Imo	0	0	5	0	0
Kaduna	3	0	0	0	2
Kano	0	0	0	0	5
Kwara	3	2	0	0	0
Lagos	0	5	0	0	0
Niger	5	0	0	0	0
Ogun	0	5	0	0	0
Ondo	0	5	0	0	0
Oyo	0	5	0	0	0
Plateau	1	0	4	0	0
Rivers	3	0	2	0	0
Sokoto	5	0	0	0	0
Source: Oyediran

=== House of Representatives ===
Party	Votes	%	Seats
National Party of Nigeria	5,325,680	35.6	168
Unity Party of Nigeria	3,691,553	24.6	111
Nigerian People's Party	2,391,279	16.0	78
People's Redemption Party			49
Great Nigeria People's Party			43
Total			449
Total votes	14,941,555	–	
Registered voters/turnout	48,633,782	30.72	
Source: Nohlen et al.

==== By state ====
State	NPN	UPN	NPP	GNPP	PRP
Anambra	3	0	26	0	0
Bauchi	18	0	1	1	0
Bendel	6	12	2	0	0
Benue	18	0	1	0	0
Borno	2	0	0	22	0
Cross River	22	2	0	4	0
Gongola	5	7	1	8	0
Imo	2	0	28	0	0
Kaduna	19	1	2	1	10
Kano	7	0	0	0	39
Kwara	8	5	0	1	0
Lagos	0	12	0	0	0
Niger	10	0	0	0	0
Ogun	0	12	0	0	0
Ondo	0	22	0	0	0
Oyo	4	38	0	0	0
Plateau	3	0	13	0	0
Rivers	10	0	4	0	0
Sokoto	31	0	0	6	0
Source: Oyediran
