= Dominic Oneya =

Nigerian politician and brigadier general (1948–2021)

Brigadier General Dominic Obukadata Oneya

Administrator of Kano State
- In office 22 August 1996 – September 1998
- Preceded by: Muhammadu Abdullahi Wase
- Succeeded by: Aminu Isa Kontagora

Administrator of Benue State
- In office August 1998 – 29 May 1999
- Preceded by: Aminu Isa Kontagora
- Succeeded by: George Akume

Personal details
- Born: 26 May 1948 Apapa, Lagos State, Nigeria
- Died: 4 August 2021 (aged 73)

Military service
- Allegiance: Nigeria
- Branch/service: Nigerian Army
- Rank: Brigadier General
- Commands: Adjutant, 31 Infantry Battalion (1971–1972); Commandant, Nigerian Army Physical Training School, Zaria (1985–1987); Commander, 82 Motorized Infantry Brigade, Kano (1993–1995); Commander, 16 Battalion, Nigerian ECOMOG Contingent in Liberia

Dominic Obukadata Oneya (26 May 1948 – 4 August 2021) was Administrator of Kano State, Nigeria from August 1996 to August 1998 during the military regime of General Sani Abacha, then Administrator of Benue State from August 1998 to May 1999 during the transitional regime of General Abdulsalami Abubakar, handing over power to the elected executive governor George Akume on 29 May 1999.

Later, he became Chairman of the Nigeria Football Association.

== Birth and education ==
Dominic Obukadata Oneya was born 26 May 1948 in Apapa, Local Government Area, Lagos State. His family is Urhobo. His origins are in Agbarho, Ughelli North Local Government Area, Delta State. He attended the Baptist Academy, Yaba, Lagos (1962–1967), then enlisted in the Nigerian Defence Academy in May 1969, earning a commission in the Infantry Corps in September 1971. Oneya attended the University of Ife, Ile-Ife (now Obafemi Awolowo University) (1977–1980), earning B.Sc. degree in physical education. He attended the Command and Staff College, Jaji, Kaduna (1983–1984) and the Canadian Land Force Command and Staff College, Kingston, Ontario, Canada (1987–1988).

== Military career ==
Command positions during his military career include: Adjutant of 31 Infantry Battalion (1971–1972), Instructor at 4 Division Training School (1972–1973) and Instructor at Nigerian Army Military Training College, Jaji (1975–1977). As a Staff Officer from 1977 he served at Army Headquarters Lagos and in operations with the United Nations Interim Force in Lebanon (1980–1981). He was Commandant of the Nigerian Army Physical Training School, Zaria (1985–1987), Directing Staff, Command and Staff College, Jaji (1987–1989) and Directing Staff, Ghana Armed Forces College Teshe, Ghana (1989–1991). He was appointed Commander, 82 Motorized Infantry Brigade, Kano (1993–1995), Commander, 16 Battalion, Nigerian ECOMOG Contingent in Liberia and then Director of administration, Training and Doctrine Command (1995-July 1996).

On 22 August 1996, General Sani Abacha appointed him Administrator of Kano State, Nigeria. In August 1998, he traded places with Aminu Isa Kontagora to become Administrator of Benue State during the transitional regime of General Abdulsalami Abubakar, handing over to the elected executive governor George Akume on 29 May 1999. Akume had served as Permanent Secretary for Brigadier General Dominic Oneya. While governor of Benue State he initiated a project to build a major fertilizer plant, with the government paying about N70 million for preliminary work. However, there were delays and setbacks, and the project was only completed in February 2007.

== Later career ==
On 17 January 2000, Oneya was appointed Chairman of the Nigeria Football Association.

In February 2002, talking of a decision to replace Amodu Shaibu by Festus Onigbinde as manager, he said Nigeria should have gained more than a bronze medal at the African Nations Cup, given the wealth of talent among Nigerian footballers. He was looking forward to stronger performances at the upcoming World Cup, the 2004 Summer Olympics and the 2003 All-Africa Games which would be hosted by Nigeria.

In July 2008, Oneya headed a team charged by the National Sports Commission with investigating allegations of corruption in the local league, in response to comments from former Kano Pillars coach Kadiri Ikhana. Speaking on Lagos radio in December 2009, Oneya appealed to Nigerians to give Super Eagles Head Coach, Shuaibu Amodu, a free rein to do his job.

== See also ==
- List of governors of Benue State
