= Moses Adasu =

Nigerian politician, Governor of Benue State (1945–2005)

Moses Orshio Adasu

Governor of Benue State
- In office 2 January 1992 – November 1993
- Preceded by: Fidelis Makka
- Succeeded by: Joshua Obademi

Personal details
- Born: 12 June 1945 Mbaamena, Konshisha LGA, Benue State, Nigeria
- Died: 20 November 2005 (aged 60)

Very Rev. Fr. Moses Orshio Adasu (12 June 1945 – 20 November 2005) became governor of Benue State, Nigeria on 2 January 1992, elected on the Social Democratic Party (SDP) platform. He left office after the military coup in November 1993 in which General Sani Abacha came to power.

== Background ==
Adasu was born on 12 June 1945 at Mbaamena, near Awajir in Shangev-Tiev District of Konshisha Local Government Area of Benue State. He studied at St. James Junior Seminary Keffi (1966–1968). He then attended St. Augustine's Major Seminary, Jos, an affiliate of the Propaganda Fide, (1969–1972), graduating with a bachelor's degree in divinity. Later he studied at St. John's University, New York City (1975–1976), earning an M.A. degree, and then at Catholic University of America, Washington DC (1976–1978) where he gained a Masters of Religious Education.

Adasu was a Senior Inspector of Education at the Benue State Ministry of Education headquarters, Makurdi. He also taught in Secondary and Teachers Colleges in Jos, Otukpo, and Adikpo, and at the Colleges of Education in Akwanga and Katsina-Ala. He was a member of the Christian Pilgrims Welfare Board, the Benue State Prerogative of Mercy, the Advisory Council of the Episcopal Commission on African Tradition Religion, and the Board of Governors of the College of Education, Katsina-Ala. He was Chairman of the Presbyteral Council, Dean of Makurdi Deanery, Diocese of Makurdi, and Vicar-General, Diocese of Makurdi.

== Political career ==
Adasu was elected the second Executive Governor of Benue State on 2 January 1992. He was said to have had a positive impact on conditions during his two-year term. He founded Benue State University on 27 December 1991. He reactivated and upgraded the College of Education, Oju. He conceived the concept of the Tarka Foundation, named after Senator Joseph Sarwuan Tarka and launched on 2 July 1992. The foundation's building occupies five hectares of land in Makurdi and includes an art gallery, conference rooms, recreational centers and chalets. The mandate of the foundation is unclear. Other projects that he started included BENCO roof tile, and the K/Ala fruit juice company, but he was not able to achieve a great deal during his short period in office.

Adasu stated that politics itself is not a dirty game, but it becomes tainted by those who enter it for selfish reasons. He added, "I am in politics to baptise politics and make it pure". He was removed from office when General Sani Abacha came to power in November 1993, replaced by Group Captain Joshua Obademi.

In the Nigerian Fourth Republic, Adasu was appointed a member of the Independent Corrupt Practices and Other Related Offences Commission (ICPC) in January 2001. He resigned from the ICPC in June 2002 to reenter politics. As a member of the Alliance for Democracy (AD) party, he challenged the incumbent Governor George Akume of the People's Democratic Party (PDP) in the April 2003 gubernatorial elections, but was not successful. In September 2004 he was head of one of the National Convention Committees for the AD, after a factional split in the party caused by the return of former chairman Ahmed Abdulkadir.

Adasu died on 20 November 2005. After his death, Benue State University conferred an honorary doctorate degree on Adasu.
