= Waziri Ibrahim =

Nigerian businessman and politician (1926–1992)

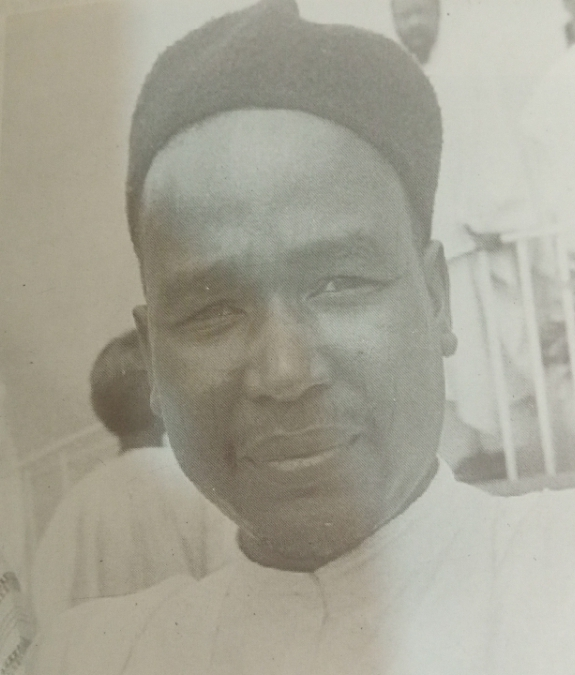

Minister of Economic Development
- In office 1961–1966
- Prime Minister: Abubakar Tafawa Balewa
- Preceded by: Jaja Wachuku

Minister of Health
- In office 1959–1961
- Prime Minister: Abubakar Tafawa Balewa
- Preceded by: Ayo Rosiji
- Succeeded by: Moses Majekodunmi

Member of Parliament in the House of Representatives
- In office December 1959 – 15 January 1966
- Preceded by: Position established
- Succeeded by: Position abolished
- Constituency: Konduga-Mafa

Personal details
- Born: 26 February 1926 Maiduguri, British Nigeria
- Died: 1992 (aged 65–66)
- Party: Great Nigeria People's Party
- Other political affiliations: Northern People's Congress
- Children: 14 (including Khadija Abba)

Alhaji Waziri Kolo Ibrahim (26 February 1926 – 1992) was a Nigerian businessman and politician during the Nigerian Second Republic. He was one of the original founders and financiers of the Nigerian People's Party, but in 1978 left the party to form the Great Nigeria People's Party (GNPP). As a candidate of the GNPP, he won almost 10% of the national vote in the 1979 Nigerian presidential election. And there is an Estate named after him in Damaturu as Waziri Ibrahim Housing Estate.

== Early life ==
Ibrahim was born on 26 February 1926 in Yerwa, Maiduguri. His father, Baba Alhaji Ibrahim Ibn Mohammed was an Islamic scholar; he named the new born boy after a friend who was then Waziri of Borno. Waziri's early childhood was in Damaturu where his father was the imam of a local mosque. He attended Damaturu Elementary School (1936–1939), followed by studies at Maiduguri Middle School (1940–1943) and then Kaduna College, 1944–1947. At Kaduna College, he was a classmate of Professor Umaru Shehu; before completing his studies, it was the desire of the then Chief Education Officer of Borno, Kashim Ibrahim that Waziri should enter the teaching service after graduation. However, Waziri did not go further in training after Kaduna College nor did he teach; instead he chose to work with U.A.C. as a trainee manager in 1948. At the firm, he rose through clerical and administrative ranks from acting as a cashier and storekeeper at U.A.C.'s, Maiduguri branch in 1951. He then worked at Jos in 1952 before becoming a labour and staff manager for Benue division in 1953. By the time he left the firm, he was district manager of Kaduna.

== Political and business career ==
In politics, Waziri was initially a member of NEPU; he organized the Damaturu branch of the association in 1950 and was the branch chairman in 1951. However, towards the end of the 1950s, Waziri joined NPC and was appointed the Federal Minister of Health in 1958. In 1960, he was part of the Nigerian delegation to the United Nations when the country was accepted as the 99th member of the organization. In 1962, as minister for Economic Development, he presented to the Nigerian Parliament an ambitious capital expenditure budget over a six-year span based on a projected 4% annual growth in GDP and investment of resources in productive projects to foster development. Among the major planks of the budget, was the development of the Kainji Dam. However, close to half of the capital expenditure resource was to be obtained through foreign aid.

In 1962, Nigeria conducted a controversial census that was rejected by political leaders from the Eastern and Western region; the office of the census officer was under Waziri's ministry. Accusations of over counting were made on all sides, with Waziri accusing the Eastern region of inflating population figures while the southern leaders labelled the Northern head count as over-inflated. The controversy generated by the head count led the cancellation of the census results and official figures were never publicly acknowledged.

After the military coup of 1966, Waziri went into private business. During the Nigerian Civil War, he was involved in arms dealing and consultancy and afterwards, he established a defence consultancy firm. Waziri established a group of companies under the corporate name Herwa which included a tin mining venture in Jos and a soap and flour mill in Maiduguri. He opened a 5 million naira Herwa clinic in Kano. He entered the fishing industry after buying out Stephen Tolbert's fishing concern and in addition, imported frozen fish under the corporate name Nigeria Cold Stores.

In 1978, Waziri joined politics again; he co-founded the NPP with members of Club 19 and the Council for National Unity. However, a disagreement arose between Waziri and some party members who were largely disciples of Azikiwe such as Adeniran Ogunsanya. Leaders of Club 19 and Council for National Unity opposed Ibrahim's ambition of becoming both the party's chairman and its presidential candidate. The conflict deepened after the party's first convention in 1978 and subsequently led to his exit from the party. He then formed the Great Nigeria People's Party. He was an unsuccessful presidential candidate in the 1979 election, but was popular in the Kanuri base. His party won the gubernatorial election in Borno where the Kanuri formed a majority, and also nearby Gongola state.

== Personal life ==
Waziri's first marriage was to a Shuwa Arab woman, Fatime; he later married two other wives, the last being Fatimah, daughter of Kashim Ibrahim.

He was the father of Khadija Bukar Abba Ibrahim.
