= Abdullahi Shelleng =

Nigerian military governor

Major General Abdullahi Shelleng

Military Governor of Benue State
- In office 3 February 1976 – July 1978
- Preceded by: Abdullahi Mohammed (Benue-Plateau)
- Succeeded by: Adebayo Lawal

Commandant of the Nigerian Defence Academy
- In office 1982 – January 1984
- Preceded by: Brig Zamani Lekwot
- Succeeded by: Maj Gen Paul Tarfa

Personal details
- Born: 20 January 1942 (age 84) Shelleng, Numan LGA, Adamawa State, Nigeria

Military service
- Allegiance: Nigeria
- Branch/service: Nigerian Army
- Rank: Major General

Abdullahi Shelleng (born 20 January 1942) was the first Military Governor of Benue State during the military regime of General Olusegun Obasanjo, after Benue State had been split from the old Benue-Plateau State. He ruled from 3 February 1976 to July 1978 .

== Background and education ==
Abdullahi Shelleng was born on 20 January 1942 in Shelleng, in the Numan Local Government Area of the former Gongola State (now Adamawa State). He was educated in Shelleng and Yola, and attended the Government College, Zaria (1957–1961). He joined the Army in 1962 and attended the Nigerian Defence Academy, Kaduna (April 1962 – August 1962), and then the Pakistan Military Academy, Kakul (1962–1965).

== Military career ==
He was commissioned 2nd Lieutenant in April 1965. He served as a Company Commander during the Nigerian Civil War. He attended Command and General Staff College, Fort Leavenworth, Kansas, USA (1973–1974), and then was appointed Colonel, General Staff in Hq. 2nd Infantry Division, Nigerian Army, Ibadan (1974–1975).

He was one of the participants in the July 1975 coup against General Yakubu Gowon, monitoring the situation from the 2nd Division HQ at Ibadan.

Following the coup, he became a Principal Staff Officer, Supreme Headquarters, Lagos (1975–1976).

== Governor of Benue State ==
General Murtala Mohammed appointed Abdullahi Shelleng as Military Governor of Benue State on 3 February 1976, a post he held until July 1978.

Shelleng had the difficult job of creating a functioning state machinery with an ethnically mixed and politically dissatisfied population. He built accommodation for civil servants and established schools and colleges, including the Murtala College of Arts, Science and Technology. He also initiated Benue Brewery at Makurdi, Idah Sanitary Ware Industry at Idah, and the Burnt Brick Industry at Otukpo. However, he failed to repair the untarred roads in the state. In many cases he opened establishments on temporary sites, thus storing up problems for the future. He was also criticized for destroying the mini Makurdi Stadium.

== Later career ==
After retiring from the army, Abdullahi Shelleng became one of the leaders of the umbrella union of the North, the Arewa Consultative Forum.

In October 2005, he was one of the Adamawa State delegates at the National Convention of the Peoples Democratic Party (PDP).

In April 2006 he was one of a group of Adamawa State PDP members who announced they had suspended Vice President Atiku Abubakar and the state governor Boni Haruna.
