= Isaac Shaahu =

Nigerian politician

Isaac Shaahu is a Nigerian politician from what is termed the middle belt of Nigeria. He was a cabinet minister in the aborted second republic. He later became Chairman of the Middle Belt Forum.

Shaahu was active in Middle Belt politics during the First Republic as an associate of Joseph Tarka, He was a member of the United Middle Belt Congress and in 1965 as an elected member of the Northern regional House of Assembly, he was the leader of opposition. When Benue-Plateau State was created, he was commissioner for Agriculture and later that of Health and Establishment.
