= List of governors of Benue State =

The governor of Benue state leads the executive branch. He appoints heads of the state ministries. He is also the chief security officer of the state. The current governor is Rev Fr Hyacinth Alia. This is a list of administrators and governors of Benue State. Benue State of Nigeria was formed on 03 February 1976 when Benue-Plateau State was divided into Benue and Plateau states.

Name	Title	Took office	Left office	Party	Notes
Abdullahi Shelleng	Governor	March 1976	July 1978	Military	
Adebayo Lawal	Governor	July 1978	October 1979	Military	
Aper Aku	Governor	October 1979	December 1983	NPN	
John Kpera	Governor	January 1984	August 1985	Military	
Jonah David Jang	Governor	August 1985	August 1986	Military	
Yohanna Madaki	Governor	August 1986	September 1986	Military	
Ishaya Bakut	Governor	September 1986	1987	Military	
Idris Garba	Governor	1987	1987	Military	
Fidelis Makka	Governor	December 1987	January 1992	Military	
Moses Adasu	Governor	January 1992	November 1993	SDP	
Joshua O. Obademi	Administrator	9 December 1993	22 August 1996	Military	
Aminu Isa Kontagora	Administrator	22 August 1996	August 1998	Military	
Dominic Oneya	Administrator	August 1998	May 1999	Military	
George Akume	Governor	29 May 1999	29 May 2007	PDP	
Gabriel Suswam	Governor	29 May 2007	29 May 2015	PDP	
Samuel Ortom	Governor	29 May 2015	29 May 2023	PDP	
Rev. Fr. Hyacinth Alia	Governor	29 May 2023	Incumbent	APC	

== See also ==
- States of Nigeria
- List of state governors of Nigeria

== Sources ==
- "Nigerian Federal States". WorldStatesmen.
