= Joseph Tarka =

Nigerian politician (1932–1980)

Joseph Sarwuan Tarka

Senator for Benue East Central
- In office 9 October 1979 – 30 March 1980

Federal Commissioner of Communications
- In office 1971 – 1 August 1974
- Preceded by: Aminu Kano
- Succeeded by: Murtala Mohammed

Federal Commissioner of Transport
- In office 12 June 1967 – 1971
- Preceded by: Zanna Bukar Dipcharima
- Succeeded by: R. A. B. Dikko

Member of Parliament for Jemgbar
- In office 1954–1966
- Preceded by: position established
- Succeeded by: position abolished

Personal details
- Born: July 10, 1932 Igbor, TIv Division, Nigeria (today in Benue State)
- Died: March 30, 1980 (aged 47) London, UK
- Party: National Party of Nigeria (1978–1980)
- Other political affiliations: United Middle Belt Congress (until 1966)
- Children: Simeon: Chris

Senator Joseph Sarwuan Tarka CFR (10 July 1932 – 30 March 1980) was a Nigerian politician from Benue State and a former minister for Transport and then Communications under General Yakubu Gowon. He was one of the founding members of the United Middle Belt Congress, a political organization dedicated to protecting and advocating for the country's Middle Belt.

== Background ==
Tarka was born on 10 July 1932 in Igbor, Benue State. He was the son of Tarka Nachi and Ikpa Anyam. His father was a village teacher of Tiv origin who later became a headmaster and then chief in Mbakor, Gboko area. He attended Native Authority Primary School, Gboko and Katsina Ala Middle School. After completing his education, he became a teacher at Katsina-Ala Middle School before going on to further studies at Bauchi Rural Science School. He was a member of the Tiv Native Authority Staff Union and of the Northern Teachers Association.

While still working as a teacher, Tarka became interested in politics, drawing inspiration primarily from the radical intellectual Sa'adu Zungur, the writings of Abubakar Tafawa Balewa, and the speeches of Nnamdi Azikiwe.

== First Republic ==
In 1954, on a ticket that was allied with the Middle Belt People's Party, Tarka was elected to represent the Jemgbagh constituency in the Federal House of Representative. In 1957, the Middle Belt People's Party merged with the David Lot led Middle Zone League to form the United Middle Belt Congress. Tarka then emerged as President of the United Middle Belt Congress (UMBC), the party soon formed an alliance with the Action Group, the dominant party in the Western Region. Action Group wanted support for the merger of Ilorin and Kabba with the Western Region and UMBC wanted the creation of a Middle Belt State. Tarka was a nominated member to the Nigerian Constitutional Conference of 1957 and was also the representative of the Middle Belt zone to the Willinks Commission of 1958. In 1958, he was appointed as a shadow minister of commerce.

Tarka's UMBC, a predominantly Christian party contested the pre-independence election of 1959 and the subsequent election of 1963 against the mainly Muslim Northern People's Congress. Both elections led to violence in the Middle Belt, which contributed to the Major Chukwuma Kaduna Nzeogwu's inspired military take-over on January 15, 1966. Tarka was an advocate of state creation to give politically and economically empower minority groups within the country. He supported the creation of a Middle Belt state before the republic was truncated.

In April 1961, a year after a crisis in Tiv land, Tarka was detained for three weeks in Jos under the cloud of investigation for treason and inciting unrest during the Tiv disturbances., his arrest was a month away from regional elections. In 1962, UMBC which was partly funded by the Action Group decided to end their alliance for a new one with NEPU. The new party was called Northern People's Front with Aminu Kano as President and Tarka as General Secretary.

In 1962, along with other Action Group leaders, he was arrested on charges of treasonable felony but was acquitted for lack of evidence.

== Later career ==
After General Gowon took charge in August 1966, Tarka was appointed Federal Commissioner of Transport and then of Communications, resigning in 1974 after allegations of corruption from a fellow-Tiv named Godwin Daboh were published. Daboh's action was allegedly instigated by Paul Unongo and Benue-Plateau State Governor Joseph Gomwalk and a police probe into the allegations was led by Sunday Adewusi.

In the lead-up to restoration of democracy with the Nigerian Second Republic, Tarka aligned with northern politicians to form the National Party of Nigeria, on which platform he unsuccessfully competed in the Presidential elections. He was elected Senator for Benue East in 1979, and was appointed chairman of the Senate Committee on Finance and Appropriation, a position he held when he died on 30 March 1980, aged 48.

His son, Simeon Tarka, was elected to the House of Representatives in 1979.

== Legacy ==
The Tarka local government area in Benue State is named in his honour. In 2019 the Federal University of Agriculture, Makurdi was renamed after him.
