= Joseph Gomwalk =

Nigerian Police officer and statesman

Military Governor of Benue-Plateau State
- In office 1967 – July 1975
- Preceded by: None (Pioneering)
- Succeeded by: Abdullahi Mohammed

Personal details
- Born: 13 April 1935 Kanke, Nigeria
- Died: 15 May 1976 (aged 41) Lagos, Nigeria
- Education: Boys' Secondary School Gindiri/ University of Ibadan
- Occupation: Police officer and statesman

Military service
- Branch/service: Nigeria Police Force
- Rank: Police Commissioner

Joseph Dechi Gomwalk (13 April 1935 – 15 May 1976) was a Nigerian police commissioner and the first military governor of the defunct Benue-Plateau State. He was tried and then executed due to his alleged connections to the Buka Suka Dimka's attempted coup against the military government of Murtala Mohammed.

== Education ==
Gomwalk was Ngas from Ampang (Pang) in the presentday Kanke Local Government Area of Plateau State. He attended the famous Boys' Secondary School, Gindiri, where he graduated with distinctions in both academics and sports. He proceeded to the premier University of Ibadan and graduated with a degree in Zoology.

== Governorship of Benue-Plateau State ==
Gomwalk was governor of the state from 1967 until 1975, when military head of state Yakubu Gowon's regime was toppled in a coup d'état.

As governor, Gomwalk's administration founded the Nigerian Standard daily in 1972. After failing to get Ahmadu Bello University of Zaria to open a satellite campus in the state, he turned to the University of Ibadan; that institution opened its Jos campus (which later became the University of Jos) in November 1971.

In August 1974, affidavits alleging corruption on the part of Gomwalk and Joseph Tarka, Benue-Plateau State's representative to the Federal Executive Council, were published; Tarka resigned, but Gomwalk, with Gowon's support, remained in office.

== Execution ==
After Gowon's overthrow and the installation of Murtala Mohammed, Gomwalk was implicated in Buka Suka Dimka's attempted coup of February 13, 1976. He, Dimka and other convicted persons were executed by firing squad on May 15, 1976.
