= Magaji Abdullahi =

Nigerian politician

Engineer Magaji Abdullahi

Deputy Governor
- In office 29 May 2003 – 29 May 2007
- Governor: Ibrahim Shekarau
- Preceded by: Abdullahi Umar Ganduje
- Succeeded by: Abdullahi Tijjani Gwarzo

National Senator
- Succeeded by: Bello Hayatu Gwarzo

NCPN National Party Chairman
- In office 1995-1998

Personal details
- Born: 22 November 1947 Kano State, Nigeria
- Died: 24 July 2016 (aged 68) Aminu Kano Teaching Hospital, Kano
- Party: NCPN; SDP
- Education: Ahmadu Bello University
- Occupation: Civil servant
- Profession: Politician, civil engineer

Engineer Magaji Abdullahi (22 November 1947 – 24 July 2016) was a Nigerian politician. He was the deputy governor of Kano State between 2003 and 2007. Abdullahi led the Water Resources Engineering and Construction Agency (WRECA) in Kano State, Permanent Secretary Ministry of Works and Housing, Director General Ministry of Works, Housing and Transport, Commissioner Ministry of Works, Housing and Transport.

Abdullahi came into the limelight when he contested for the governorship of Kano State, under the defunct Social Democratic Party (Nigeria)(SDP) in 1991. Initially he was in the political faction of Santsi led by Abubakar Rimi before forming the Kurdawa faction which merged with the Peoples Front (PF) led by Major General Shehu Musa Yar'Adua with Peoples Front politicians such as Babagana Kingibe, Atiku Abubakar, Abdullahi Aliyu Sumaila, Chuba Okadigbo, Tony Anenih, Lamidi Adedibu, Dapo Sarumi, Bola Tinubu, Umaru Yar'Adua, Sunday Afolabi, Rabiu Kwankwaso who was his employee at WRECA and Ahmadu Rufa'i who contested the Deputy Gubnetorial seat with him under the SDP. He was the Senator representing Kano North 1992–1993 in the Third Nigerian Republic under the SDP/PF FACTION. He was part of the Shehu Musa Yar'Adua Peoples Democratic Movement (PDM) and was a member of the 1995 Constitutional Confrecnce, he was the National Chairman of the National Center Party of Nigeria (NCPN).

In 1998, he defeated Kabiru Gaya in the All Peoples party APP that is the defunct All Nigeria Peoples Party ANPP governorship primaries but lost to Rabiu Kwankwaso of the Peoples Democratic Party PDP in the 1999 Nigerian general election. In 2003 Ibrahim Shekarau choose him as his running mate where he served as Deputy Governor from 2003 to 2007. Ibrahim Khaleel Inuwa is a member of the Shekarau Transition committee in 2003 and Kabiru Muhammad Gwangwazo was the Acting Chairman of All Peoples party (APP) that is the defunct All Nigeria Peoples Party ANPP

== Death ==
Abdullahi died on 27 July 2016 in Aminu Kano Teaching Hospital in Kano, Nigeria.
