= United Middle Belt Congress =

Political party in Nigeria

United Middle Belt Congress (UMBC) was a political party in Nigeria during the nation's First Republic. The Party was a fusion of two major Middle Belt organizations, viz. the Middle Zone League and the Middle Belt Peoples' Party. The party was formed to create a political platform for the various ethnic groups in central Nigeria covering parts of present-day Benue State, Kogi State, Plateau State, Nasarawa State, Adamawa State and Kwara State. Its establishment was an act to ensure an alternative minority voice in the Northern Nigeria Assembly which was dominated by the Northern People's Congress, a political party which the central Nigerian leaders felt had the potential to curb the middle belt's political voice. The UMBC in due time, became the Third largest opposition party in the Northern Nigeria Assembly. In 1958, the UMBC entered into an alliance with the Southwest Nigeria dominant Action Group of Chief Obafemi Awolowo.

== Party Structure ==
Some of the early leaders of the UMBC were Joseph Tarka, Akase Dowgo, David Lot, Patrick Dokotri, Edward Kundu Swem, Ahmadu Angara, Isaac Shaahu (Northern Assembly Opposition Leader), Solomon Lar, D. Bulus Biliyong, D.D. Dimka, V.T. Shisha, M.D. Iyorka, Ugba Uyeh and Vincent Igbarumun Orjime. The party adopted a decentralized nomination system whereby local ethnic unions or special committees in a given area nominated and presented candidates for local elections, this was partly used to validate the ethnic diversity of the party.
