= Great Nigeria People's Party =

Nigerian political party

The Great Nigeria People's Party was one of the six major political parties that fielded candidates for elections in the Nigerian Second Republic. The party was formed by a splinter group from the Nigerian People's Party, the group was led by Waziri Ibrahim, a politician and businessman from Borno. Waziri was one of the leaders of the three associations that formed the nucleus of NPP. The original intention of NPP was to transcend the politics of ethnicity and to promote the cause of both the prominent ethnic groups and ethnic minorities. However, the entry of Nnamdi Azikiwe to NPP led to a power struggle in which Waziri lost. Waziri then led a group of minorities in the north and some southerners to form the Great Nigeria Peoples Party.

Though the original intentions of leaders of the party was to surpass ethnic and sectarian politics, the party's strength nevertheless lay in the northeast, among the Kanuris and some northern minorities.

== Elections ==
In the 1979 elections, the party won a total of eight senate seats, mostly from the Northeast and about 8.4% of total votes in the senate election. In the House of representative election, the party won about 43 seats and close to 10% of the overall votes in the election. In the presidential election, Ibrahim Waziri, the party's candidate, took home about 10% of the total votes in the election.

== The party in the Second Republic ==
During the run-up to the election, the party went into an informal alliance with the Unity Party of Nigeria, the alliance was viable in some of the states and house elections where either party was less visible. Though, the party was less critical of the Shagari presidency than the UPN, the party, nevertheless, supported an oppositional role and tried to form alliances with other southern parties and some groups in the PRP to form a progressive movement. However, the party was embroiled in an internal crisis in 1981, when some notable members of the party were publicly supporting the dominant National Party of Nigeria. The party leadership expelled most of the members but the rift and subsequent actions only widened the strains of the party.
