= Second Nigerian Republic =

Second formation of Nigeria 1979–1983

Federal Republic of Nigeria
- 1979–1983
- Flag Coat of arms
- Motto: "Unity and Faith, Peace and Progress"
- Anthem: Arise, O Compatriots
- Capital: Lagos
- Common languages: English; Hausa; Igbo; Yoruba; and other regional languages
- Religion: Christianity; Islam; Traditional beliefs
- Government: Federal presidential republic
- President
  - 1979–1983: Shehu Shagari
- Vice President
  - 1979–1983: Alex Ifeanyichukwu Ekwueme
- Legislature: National Assembly
  - Upper house: Senate
  - Lower house: House of Representatives
- Historical era: Cold War
  - Constitution adopted: 1 October 1979
  - Coup d'état: 31 December 1983

Area
- 923,768 km^{2} (356,669 sq mi)
- Currency: Nigerian naira
- Time zone: UTC+1 (WAT)
- ISO 3166 code: NG
Preceded by	Succeeded by
Nigerian military junta	Nigerian military junta
- Today part of: Nigeria; Cameroon^{a}
- ^a Bakassi peninsula; governed by Nigeria until 2008

The Second Nigerian Republic was a brief formation of the Nigerian state which succeeded the military governments formed after the overthrow of the first republic.

== Background ==
Contested elections and political turbulence in the Western region ended Nigeria's First republic in 1966 with the overthrow of the government by majors of the Nigerian army. A unitary style of government was subsequently decreed into law. After a counter-coup six months later, the country was drawn into a civil war between federal forces and Biafran forces (Eastern region). Just before the war, 12 new states were created from the four regions. After the victory of federal forces in 1970, the country began a period of economic boom fueled by increasing oil production and rising oil prices. The Nigerian governing structure was further broken up with the creation of smaller states in 1976, bringing the total number of states to 19.

== Foundation (1979) ==
Following the assassination of Nigerian military head of state, General Murtala Mohammed in 1976, his successor General Olusegun Obasanjo initiated the transition process to terminate military rule in 1979. A new constitution was drafted, which saw the westminster system of government (previously used in the first republic) jettisoned for an American-style presidential system. The 1979 constitution mandated that political parties and cabinet positions reflect the "federal character" of the nation. Political parties were required to be registered in at least two-thirds of the states, and each state was required to produce at least one cabinet member.

A constituent assembly was elected in 1977 to draft a new constitution, which was published on 21 September 1978, when the ban on political activities was lifted. In 1979, six political parties competed in a series of elections in which Alhaji Shehu Shagari of the National Party of Nigeria (NPN) was elected president. Obasanjo peacefully transferred power to Shagari, becoming the first head of state in Nigerian history to willingly step down. All six parties won representation in the National Assembly. In August 1983, Shagari and the NPN were returned to power in a landslide victory, with a majority of seats in the National Assembly and control of 12 state governments. But the elections were marred by violence and allegations of widespread vote rigging and electoral malfeasance led to legal battles over the results.

In the widely monitored 1979 election, Alhaji Shehu Shagari was elected on the NPN platform. On 1 October 1979, Shagari was sworn in as the first President and Commander-in-Chief of the Federal Republic of Nigeria. The military carefully planned the return to civil rule putting in place measures to ensure that political parties have broader support than witnessed during the first republic. But there was also uncertainties, like the first republic, political leaders may be unable to govern properly bringing another batch of new military rulers.

== Presidents ==
Presidents during the Nigerian Second Republic
President	Term	Party
Shehu Shagari	1 October 1979 – 31 December 1983	NPN

== Political parties ==
- Greater Nigerian People's Party (GNPP)
- National Party of Nigeria (NPN)
- Nigeria Advance Party (NAP)
- Nigerian People's Party (NPP)
- People's Redemption Party (PRP)
- Unity Party of Nigeria (UPN)

== Political activism ==
Tai Solarin, an educationist, mounted public podiums regularly to speak-out in defiance of what he strongly felt were the negative views of the Second Republic government. Another such activist was Ayodele Awojobi, a professor of Mechanical Engineering, who filed several lawsuits and organised political rallies in protest of the Nigerian election results that returned Shehu Shagari, the incumbent, as president in the Second Republic - he strongly believed the results were widely rigged.

== Overthrow ==
On 31 December 1983, the military overthrew the Second Republic. Major General Muhammadu Buhari, became the military leader of the new government, citing charges of corruption and administrative incompetence as reasons for military intervention. Buhari emerged as the leader of the Supreme Military Council (SMC), the country's new ruling body. President Shagari was placed under house arrest, and several of his cabinet members were either jailed or exiled. The Buhari government was peacefully overthrown by the SMC's third-ranking member General Ibrahim Babangida in August 1985. Babangida gave misuse of power, violations of human rights by key officers of the SMC, and the government's failure to deal with the country's deepening economic crisis as justifications for the takeover. During his first days in office, President Babangida moved to restore freedom of the press and to release political detainees being held without charge. As part of a 15-month economic emergency plan he announced pay cuts for the military, police, civil servants and the private sector. President Babangida demonstrated his intent to encourage public participation in decision-making by opening a national debate on proposed economic reform and recovery measures. The public response convinced Babangida of intense opposition to an economic recovery package dependent on an International Monetary Fund (IMF) loan.

== See also ==
- First Nigerian Republic (1963–1966)
- Third Nigerian Republic (1993)
- Fourth Nigerian Republic (1999–present)
