= Benue-Plateau State =

Former state of Nigeria

- State of Nigeria
- 1967–1976
- Capital: Jos
- History
  - Established: 1967
  - Disestablished: 1976
- Today part of: present-day Benue State, Plateau State, Nassarawa State and Kogi State

Benue-Plateau State is a former administrative division of Nigeria. It was created on 27 May 1967 from parts of the Northern Region and existed until 3 February 1976, when it was divided into two states - Benue and Plateau. Its capital city was Jos, the current capital of standalone Plateau State.

== Benue-Plateau State Governors ==
- Joseph Gomwalk (May 1967 – July 1975)
- Abdullahi Mohammed (July 1975 – March 1976)
