= National Party of Nigeria =

- Chairman: Augustus Akinloye
- Founded: 29 September 1978; 47 years ago
- Headquarters: Lagos, Nigeria
- Political position: Big tent
- Colours: Nigerian national colors

The National Party of Nigeria (NPN) was the dominant political party in Nigeria during the Second Republic (1979–1983).

== History ==
=== Formation ===
The party's beginning could be traced to private and sometimes secret meetings among key Northern Nigerian leaders after the proscription of political parties in 1966 by the military regimes of Johnson Aguiyi-Ironsi and General Yakubu Gowon. A few members of the proscribed parties based in the Northern section of Nigeria began to organize to form a northern party to prepare for a return to democracy. The group also approached southern Nigerians about the prospect of a truly national party. A constitutional assembly organized in 1977 to prepare a constitution for a new democratic government, proved to be the best avenue for members of the burgeoning group to meet and discuss plans for their regions and nation. On September 20, 1978, the National Party of Nigeria was formed, composed of members of the constituent assembly and was headed by Makaman Bida, an old Northern People's Congress (NPC) member. At formation, the party was able to draw beyond it core base of former NPC members and attracted some First republic politicians such as Joseph Tarka, former leader of the United Middle Belt Congress, K.O. Mbadiwe, one time minister and Remi Fani-Kayode, a former NNDP member. In October 1978, the party adopted zoning to elect party officials. The party then elected a new chairman, Augustus Akinloye, a Yoruba man and former Nigerian National Democratic Party government minister over contenders such as Fani Kayode, Adeyinka Adebayo and Adeleke Adedoyin. The election of a southern Nigerian paved the way for the presidential candidate to go to the core base of the party: the Hausa-Fulani states.

=== Elections ===
The NPN presented candidates for two major elections, the 1979 elections and the 1983 elections. The party won 36 Senate seats out of 95 Senate seats and 168 seats out of 449 seats of the House of Representatives. On August 16, 1979, the party's candidate in the presidential election, Shehu Shagari, was declared the winner. The party entered into a shaky alliance with the Nigerian Peoples Party to earn majority votes in the National Assembly, the alliance later hit the rocks in 1981. To gain support among Igbo people, the party allowed the return of Odumegwu Ojukwu, the Biafra leader.

Moshood Abiola, a former member of the National Council of Nigeria and the Cameroons (NCNC), was not successful to hold chairmanship or presidential ticket of the NPN and later stood as the candidate of the Social Democratic Party (SDP) in the cancelled 1993 presidential election. Adamu Ciroma, a former secretary of the NPN, later became a senior member of the People's Democratic Party.

== Ideology ==
One of the campaign promises was the implementation of Green Revolution as an agricultural policy.

== Electoral history ==
=== Presidential elections ===
Election	Party candidate	Running mate	Votes	%	Result
1979	Shehu Shagari	Alex Ekwueme	5,668,857	33.77%	Elected ✓
1983	Shehu Shagari	Alex Ekwueme	12,081,471	47.5%	Elected ✓

=== House of Representatives and Senate elections ===
Election	House of Representatives					Senate				
Election	Votes	%	Seats	+/–	Position	Votes	%	Seats	+/–	Position
1979	5,325,680	35.6%	168 / 449	▲168	▲1st	4,032,329	35.6%	36 / 95	▲36	▲1st
1983			306 / 450	▲138	1st			60 / 96	▲24	1st
