= Nigerian People's Party =

Political party in the Nigerian Second Republic

The Nigerian People's Party (NPP) was one of the major political parties that contested elections in the Second Nigerian Republic (1979-1983). It was one of the five parties that the Federal Electoral Commission approved as having a national, rather than an ethnically- or religiously-limited, scope.

== Background ==
Nigeria had been ruled by a military dictatorship since 1966, when a coup and counter-coup led to the fall of the First Nigerian Republic. Ethnic and geographic tensions in the early years of the junta led to a four-year long civil war. But, beginning in 1975, the military dictatorship initiated a democratization process. This involved the drafting of a new constitution, and eventually culminated in the foundation of the Second Nigerian Republic in 1978 and 1979.

Given the fractured nature of Nigerian society and identity at the time, the founding documents of the Second Republic placed a heavy emphasis on positive actions to unite the country across ethnic, linguistic, and religious lines. This carried over to the political parties that emerged in the nascent republic; they were required to meet three criteria to be considered national organizations, rather than regional or ethnic organizations.

== Early years ==
The Nigerian Peoples Party was one of five political parties that the Federal Electoral Commission approved as national political parties. It was particularly focused on bridging regional and ethnic divisions, drawing inspiration from efforts in the early democratization process, and branded itself as a party for a "majority of minorities". In its early years, the NPP was one of three centre-right parties, alongside the Great Nigerian People's Party and the National Party of Nigeria.

Map showing the languages of Nigeria; the NPP's support was concentrated in the Yoruba areas of the southwest, and the Igbo lands in the south.

The party's early membership drew from a coalition of ethnic/geographic minority members in the Constituent Assembly and former members of the National Council of Nigeria and the Cameroons (NCNC). The party generally ignored the major ethnic blocs of Nigeria, such as the Hausa and Fulani peoples. As the Constituent Assembly progressed, three major groups emerged as the core of the party: the "Progressives" from Anambra and Imo States, Club 19, and ex-NCNC members from Lagos and Yorubaland. As a result, the bulk of the party's support came from the Middle Belt and Igboland.

Waziri Ibrahim and his supporters (known as the National Union Council) were recruited into the party, in part because of Waziri's wealth. However, Waziri wanted to be the chairman and presidential candidate of the NPP. When the NPP denied him these positions, he left and formed his own party, the Great Nigerian People's Party (GNPP). The NPP then convinced former president Nnamdi Azikiwe to come out of retirement to be its presidential candidate and redeveloped its platform to focus on promoting democracy, adopting the slogan "Power to the People". Under Azikiwe, the party became connected with the political aspirations of the Igbo people and non-Muslims in Plateau State.

The party later came to be seen as an eastern Nigerian party, though it had scores of support in Plateau State, Rivers State and Lagos. The party tried to promote social justice and social change as vital ingredients of its mission.

== 1979 elections ==
Nnamdi Azikiwe, President of Nigeria during the First Republic, was the NPP presidential candidate in the 1979 election

In the first parliamentary elections of the Second Republic, held in 1979, the NPP came in third, winning 16 of the 95 seats in the Senate and 78 of 449 in the House of Representatives. They joined a majority coalition with the National Party of Nigeria (NPN), which had won the most seats in both houses.

The NPP's geographic heartland was evident in the election results. NPP candidates dominated the senate vote in Anambra and Imo States, and had a plurality in Plateau State. Similarly, in the House vote, the NPP representatives came largely from these three states and Rivers State. NPP candidates were also elected as governors in Anambra, Imo, and Plateau.

In states like Imo State, leaders such as the governor, Sam Mbakwe were elected with landslide victories (over 80%) in the Imo State Legislative, Gubernatorial and Presidential Elections in Nigeria in 1979. In Imo State, the NPP Campaign Director, Party Secretary and principal architect in electing Sam Mbakwe, was Dr. Sebastian Okechukwu Mezu.

After the election, the National Party of Nigeria's (NPN) weak hold on the House of Assembly led to an alliance between the NPP and the NPN. As a result, NPP politicians such as Ishaya Audu, a vice presidential candidate of the party, were selected as ministers. However, the accord hit the rocks in 1981, and Adeniran Ogunsanya, the chairman of the party, asked all ministers to resign. Many did not heed his call and some transferred to the NPN.

== 1983 elections and the end of the Second Republic ==
The next scheduled elections occurred in August 1983. The same five parties contested the elections as in 1979, and again, the NPP came third in the number of Senate and House seats won. This time, however, the NPN won a sizable majority in both houses and did not need to work with the NPP to form a government.

The Second Republic came to an end with a coup on December 31, 1983. The radio announcement of the coup included a proclamation that all political parties were banned and their assets were frozen, marking the end of the NPP.
