= 2005 South American Under-17 Football Championship squads =

Players name marked in bold have been capped at full international level.

== Group A ==
=== Bolivia ===
Head coach: (Uruguay) Walter Roque

No.	Pos.	Player	Date of birth (age)	Caps	Club
1	GK	Gustavo Pereira	29 June 1988 (aged 17)		(Bolivia) Calleja
2	DF	Ulises Morón	8 September 1988 (aged 17)		(Bolivia) Calleja
3	DF	Luis Antonio Carbajal	20 December 1990 (aged 14)		(Bolivia) Amazonia
4	DF	Diego Blanco	10 March 1988 (aged 17)		(Bolivia) Aurora
5	DF	Franklin Herrera	14 April 1988 (aged 17)		(Bolivia) San José
6	MF	Maximiliano Rosales	21 August 1988 (aged 17)		(Bolivia) 25 de Junio
7	FW	Antonio Vaca	3 October 1988 (aged 16)		(Bolivia) Calleja
8	MF	José Antonio Revuelta	25 April 1988 (aged 17)		(Bolivia) Calleja
9	FW	**Gustavo Pinedo**	18 February 1988 (aged 17)		(Bolivia) Calleja
10	MF	**Jhasmany Campos**	10 May 1988 (aged 17)		(Bolivia) Calleja
11	FW	Raimundo Barboza	10 February 1988 (aged 17)		(Bolivia) Universidad
12	GK	José Peñarrieta	18 November 1988 (aged 16)		(Bolivia) Juventud Unida
13	FW	Jammer Roca	15 May 1988 (aged 17)		(Bolivia) Vaca Díez
14	DF	Harold Guasinave	9 November 1988 (aged 16)		(Bolivia) 1º de Mayo
15	MF	Franklin Guzmán	21 February 1988 (aged 17)		(Bolivia) Calleja
16	DF	Sergio Guerra	24 February 1988 (aged 17)		(Bolivia) Calleja
17	DF	José Jaime Salazar	9 June 1988 (aged 17)		(Bolivia) The Strongest
18	MF	Ariel Juárez	26 March 1988 (aged 17)		(Bolivia) Regatas F.
19	MF	Nelson Panozo	29 October 1988 (aged 16)		(Brazil) Universitario
20	FW	Miguel Alejandro Reyes	20 December 1989 (aged 15)		(Bolivia) Bancruz

=== Brazil ===
Head coach: (Brazil) Nelson Rodrigues

No.	Pos.	Player	Date of birth (age)	Caps	Club
1	GK	Felipe	10 January 1988 (aged 17)		(Brazil) Santos
2	DF	Leyrielton	22 June 1988 (aged 17)		(Brazil) Goiás
3	DF	Sidnei	23 August 1989 (aged 16)		(Brazil) Internacional
4	DF	Samuel	7 March 1988 (aged 17)		(Brazil) Atlético Mineiro
5	MF	Roberto	24 April 1988 (aged 17)		(Brazil) Guarani
6	DF	**Marcelo**	12 May 1988 (aged 17)		(Brazil) Fluminense
7	MF	Denílson (c)	16 February 1988 (aged 17)		(Brazil) São Paulo
8	MF	**Anderson**	13 April 1988 (aged 17)		(Brazil) Grêmio
9	FW	Igor	14 June 1988 (aged 17)		(Brazil) Corinthians
10	MF	Ramón	24 May 1988 (aged 17)		(Brazil) Atlético Mineiro
11	FW	Celso	18 October 1988 (aged 16)		(Brazil) Portuguesa
12	GK	Luiz Carlos	24 May 1988 (aged 17)		(Brazil) Internacional
13	MF	Alan	16 February 1988 (aged 17)		(Italy) Ternana Calcio
14	DF	Bruno Simões	4 July 1988 (aged 17)		(Brazil) Botafogo
15	DF	Thiago Heleno	17 September 1988 (aged 16)		(Brazil) Cruzeiro
16	MF	Maurício	21 October 1988 (aged 16)		(Brazil) Corinthians
17	MF	Tácio	21 January 1988 (aged 17)		(Brazil) Vitória
18	MF	**Renato Augusto**	8 February 1988 (aged 17)		(Brazil) Flamengo
19	FW	Ricardinho	8 August 1988 (aged 17)		(Brazil) Atlético Paranaense
20	MF	Kerlon	27 January 1988 (aged 17)		(Brazil) Cruzeiro

=== Ecuador ===
Head coach: (Argentina) Iván Renny Romero

No.	Pos.	Player	Date of birth (age)	Caps	Club
1	GK	Manuel Mendoza	19 January 1989 (aged 16)		(Ecuador) LDU Portoviejo
2	DF	Jorge Majao	21 January 1988 (aged 17)		(Ecuador) Manta
3	DF	Cristian Minda	9 April 1988 (aged 17)		(Ecuador) El Nacional
4	DF	Édison Carcelén	26 April 1988 (aged 17)		(Ecuador) LDU Quito
5	DF	Christian Ruiz	10 July 1988 (aged 17)		(Ecuador) LDU Quito
6	DF	Carlos Alberto Castro	7 February 1988 (aged 17)		(Ecuador) Rocafuerte
7	MF	Íder Quintero	23 August 1988 (aged 17)		(Ecuador) Manta
8	MF	Miguel Ángel Cortez	21 January 1988 (aged 17)		(Ecuador) Emelec
9	FW	**Felipe Caicedo**	5 September 1988 (aged 17)		(Ecuador) Rocafuerte
10	DF	Gabriel Rengifo	10 May 1988 (aged 17)		(Ecuador) El Nacional
11	FW	Jonathan Monar	16 December 1988 (aged 16)		(Ecuador) LDU Quito
12	GK	Leonardo León	18 February 1988 (aged 17)		(Ecuador) Emelec
13	MF	Jefferson Villacís	3 September 1988 (aged 17)		(Ecuador) El Nacional
14	FW	Raúl Canelos	1 April 1988 (aged 17)		(Ecuador) El Nacional
15	DF	Fernando Ogonaga	9 September 1988 (aged 17)		(Ecuador) LDU Quito
16	MF	Matías González	3 July 1988 (aged 17)		(Ecuador) LDU Quito
17	MF	Carlos Rodríguez	9 October 1988 (aged 16)		(Ecuador) Emelec
18	MF	Mike Rodríguez	20 April 1988 (aged 17)		(Ecuador) Barcelona
19	FW	Francisco Muñoz	21 May 1988 (aged 17)		(Ecuador) LDU Quito
20	DF	Víctor Valarezo	17 May 1988 (aged 17)		(Ecuador) Espíritu Santo

=== Paraguay ===
Head coach: (Paraguay) Cristóbal Maldonado

No.	Pos.	Player	Date of birth (age)	Caps	Club
1	GK	**Bernardo Medina**	14 January 1988 (aged 17)		(Paraguay) Libertad
2	DF	Hugo Gaona	15 April 1988 (aged 17)		(Paraguay) Olimpia
3	DF	Nery Bareiro	3 March 1988 (aged 17)		(Paraguay) Libertad
4	DF	Cirilo Mora	15 November 1988 (aged 16)		(Paraguay) Tacuary
5	DF	**Richard Salinas**	6 February 1988 (aged 17)		(Paraguay) 12 de Octubre
6	MF	**José Montiel**	19 March 1988 (aged 17)		(Paraguay) Olimpia
7	FW	**Rodolfo Gamarra**	10 December 1988 (aged 16)		(Paraguay) Libertad
8	MF	**Luis Cáceres**	16 April 1988 (aged 17)		(Paraguay) Sport Colombia
9	FW	Javier Acuña	23 June 1988 (aged 17)		(Spain) Cádiz
10	FW	Germán Segovia	6 September 1988 (aged 17)		(Paraguay) Olimpia
11	DF	Maximo Ortiz	16 February 1988 (aged 17)		(Paraguay) Libertad
12	GK	Orlando Alonso	1 April 1988 (aged 17)		(Paraguay) Guaraní
13	DF	Nelson González	2 January 1988 (aged 17)		(Paraguay) Victoria 2001
14	MF	**Víctor Ayala**	1 January 1988 (aged 17)		(Paraguay) Sport Colombia
15	FW	Darío Pereira	12 February 1988 (aged 17)		(Paraguay) Nacional Encarnación
16	MF	Diego Fretes	6 June 1988 (aged 17)		(Paraguay) Guaraní
17	MF	Diego Chamorro	23 March 1988 (aged 17)		(Paraguay) Sol de América
18	MF	Sergio Ortega	26 September 1988 (aged 16)		(Paraguay) 12 de Octubre
19	FW	Emmanuel Gamarra	18 January 1988 (aged 17)		(Argentina) River Plate
20	FW	José Alberto Rivas	24 June 1988 (aged 17)		(Paraguay) El Mensú

=== Venezuela ===
Head coach: (Venezuela) Lino Alonso

No.	Pos.	Player	Date of birth (age)	Caps	Club
1	GK	Luis Enrique Cordova	24 February 1988 (aged 17)		(Venezuela) Loyola
2	MF	José Alexander Pinto	3 March 1988 (aged 17)		(Venezuela) Escuela Chico Las Vegas
3	DF	**Roberto Rosales**	20 November 1988 (aged 16)		(Venezuela) Deportivo Gulima
4	DF	Eduar Oliveros	27 January 1988 (aged 17)		(Venezuela) IVGC
5	MF	Frank Piedrahita	15 May 1988 (aged 17)		(Venezuela) Llaneros
6	DF	**Javier González**	26 February 1988 (aged 17)		(Venezuela) Vargas
7	FW	Yan Salazar	18 April 1988 (aged 17)		(Venezuela) Escuela Emeritense
8	MF	Fernando Gómez	23 January 1988 (aged 17)		(Venezuela) IVGC
9	FW	José Colmenarez	28 February 1988 (aged 17)		(Venezuela) IVGC
10	MF	**Tomás Rincón**	13 January 1988 (aged 17)		Unattached
11	FW	Irwin Antón	10 January 1988 (aged 17)		(Venezuela) Caracas
12	GK	Alejandro Lupo	7 April 1988 (aged 17)		(Venezuela) Santo Tomás de Villanueva
13	MF	Gabriel Rodríguez	26 March 1988 (aged 17)		(Venezuela) Nueva Cádiz
14	FW	Héctor García	30 August 1988 (aged 17)		(Venezuela) Milenio
15	MF	Cristian Porras	26 March 1988 (aged 17)		(Venezuela) Lotería del Táchira
16	DF	Johanny García	1 July 1988 (aged 17)		(Venezuela) Italmaracaibo
17	DF	Gianluis Mociños	24 August 1988 (aged 17)		(Venezuela) Santo Tomás de Villanueva
18	MF	Francisco Aristeguieta	1 October 1988 (aged 16)		(Venezuela) Santo Tomás de Villanueva
19	FW	**Hermes Palomino**	4 March 1988 (aged 17)		(Venezuela) Madeirense
20	MF	Luis Vargas	8 January 1988 (aged 17)		(Venezuela) Trujillanos

== Group B ==
=== Argentina ===
Head coach: (Argentina) Miguel Ángel Tojo

No.	Pos.	Player	Date of birth (age)	Caps	Club
1	GK	Emiliano Molina	5 January 1988 (aged 17)		(Argentina) Independiente
2	DF	Juan Forlín	10 January 1988 (aged 17)		(Argentina) Boca Juniors
3	DF	Juan Caracoche	26 January 1988 (aged 17)		(Argentina) Independiente
4	DF	Miguel Torrén	12 August 1988 (aged 17)		(Argentina) Newell's Old Boys
5	MF	Javier Liendo	2 April 1988 (aged 17)		(Argentina) Belgrano
6	DF	Matías Martínez	24 March 1988 (aged 17)		(Argentina) Racing Club
7	FW	Claudio Acosta	12 February 1988 (aged 17)		(Argentina) San Lorenzo
8	MF	Nicolás Dul	5 February 1988 (aged 17)		(Argentina) River Plate
9	MF	Nicolás Ruiz	19 February 1988 (aged 17)		(Argentina) River Plate
10	MF	**Papu Gómez**	15 February 1988 (aged 17)		(Argentina) Arsenal
11	FW	Juan Antonio	5 January 1988 (aged 17)		(Argentina) CAI
12	GK	Andrés Bailo	6 September 1988 (aged 17)		(Argentina) Colón
13	DF	Jorge Sotomayor	29 March 1988 (aged 17)		(Argentina) River Plate
14	DF	Martín Martínez	12 January 1988 (aged 17)		(Argentina) Racing de Córdoba
15	MF	Federico Sardella	18 April 1988 (aged 17)		(Argentina) Banfield
16	MF	Leandro Coronel	10 February 1988 (aged 17)		(Argentina) Vélez Sarsfield
17	FW	Mauro Zárate	17 March 1988 (aged 17)		(Argentina) San Lorenzo
18	MF	Diego Buonanotte	19 April 1988 (aged 17)		(Argentina) River Plate
19	DF	Santiago Villafañe	19 May 1988 (aged 17)		(Argentina) Boca Juniors
20	FW	**Mauro Formica**	8 April 1988 (aged 17)		(Argentina) Newell's Old Boys

=== Chile ===
Head coach: (Chile) Jorge Aravena

No.	Pos.	Player	Date of birth (age)	Caps	Club
1	GK	**Cristopher Toselli**	15 June 1988 (aged 17)		(Chile) Universidad Católica
2	DF	Felipe Hernández	10 May 1988 (aged 17)		(Chile) Colo-Colo
3	DF	**Juan Abarca**	7 December 1988 (aged 16)		(Chile) Huachipato
4	DF	Cristián Abarca	20 May 1989 (aged 16)		(Chile) Colo-Colo
5	DF	Bastián Arce	17 August 1989 (aged 16)		(Chile) Colo-Colo
6	DF	**Mauricio Isla**	12 June 1988 (aged 17)		(Chile) Universidad Católica
7	MF	Carlos Rivera	26 February 1988 (aged 17)		(Chile) Huachipato
8	MF	Gerardo Cortés	17 May 1988 (aged 17)		(Chile) Deportes Concepción
9	FW	Rodrigo Tapia	13 March 1988 (aged 17)		(Chile) Colo-Colo
10	MF	**Cristóbal Jorquera**	4 August 1988 (aged 17)		(Chile) Colo-Colo
11	FW	Michael Silva	12 March 1988 (aged 17)		(Chile) Santiago Wanderers
12	GK	Carlos Lemus	3 February 1989 (aged 16)		(Chile) Colo-Colo
13	MF	Matías Campos Toro	22 June 1989 (aged 16)		(Chile) Audax Italiano
14	MF	Gonzalo Sepúlveda	11 October 1988 (aged 16)		(Chile) Universidad Católica
15	MF	Jaime Rivera	14 March 1988 (aged 17)		(Chile) O'Higgins
16	FW	Cristóbal Chávez	15 November 1988 (aged 16)		(Chile) Deportes Puerto Montt
17	FW	Patricio Salas	28 August 1988 (aged 17)		(Chile) Palestino
18	FW	**Alexis Sánchez**	19 December 1988 (aged 16)		(Chile) Cobreloa
19	FW	Sebastián Varas	1 August 1988 (aged 17)		(Chile) Everton
20	DF	Jaime Jerez	25 May 1988 (aged 17)		(Chile) Palestino

=== Colombia ===
Head coach: (Colombia) Eduardo Lara

No.	Pos.	Player	Date of birth (age)	Caps	Club
1	GK	**David Ospina**	31 August 1988 (aged 17)		(Colombia) Atlético Nacional
2	DF	Andres Gallego	26 November 1988 (aged 16)		(Colombia) Estudiantil
3	DF	**Óscar Murillo**	12 April 1988 (aged 17)		(Colombia) Deportivo Cali
4	DF	Fredys Arrieta	27 September 1989 (aged 15)		(Colombia) Junior
5	MF	Álvaro León	13 January 1988 (aged 17)		(Colombia) Academia
6	MF	**Alexander Mejía**	11 July 1988 (aged 17)		(Colombia) Deportes Quindío
7	FW	Wiston Girón	28 April 1988 (aged 17)		(Colombia) Deportes Tolima
8	FW	Daniel Ocampo	23 February 1989 (aged 16)		(Colombia) Envigado
9	FW	Edilmer Sarmiento	5 July 1988 (aged 17)		(Colombia) Once Caldas
10	MF	Diego Causado	17 June 1989 (aged 16)		(Colombia) Junior
11	MF	Pablo Murillo	28 December 1988 (aged 16)		(Colombia) Boca Juniors de Cali
12	GK	Víctor Soto	12 November 1989 (aged 15)		(Colombia) Envigado
13	DF	Fredy Machado	29 April 1988 (aged 17)		(Colombia) Liga Risaraldense
14	MF	Alejandro Bernal	3 June 1988 (aged 17)		(Colombia) Liga Risaraldense
15	DF	**Jairo Palomino**	2 August 1988 (aged 17)		(Colombia) Florida Antioquia
16	DF	Miguel Julio	21 February 1991 (aged 14)		(Colombia) Independiente Medellín
17	DF	Gustavo Rojas	6 February 1988 (aged 17)		(Colombia) Liga de Bogotá
18	FW	**Fernando Uribe**	1 January 1988 (aged 17)		(Colombia) Envigado
19	MF	Carlos Ramos	24 February 1988 (aged 17)		(Colombia) Independiente Medellín
20	DF	Nelson Asprilla	15 April 1988 (aged 17)		(Colombia) Deportivo Cali

=== Peru ===
Head coach: (Argentina) José Luis Pavoni

No.	Pos.	Player	Date of birth (age)	Caps	Club
1	GK	Wilfredo Caballero	14 May 1988 (aged 17)		(Peru) Universitario
2	DF	**Christian Ramos**	4 November 1988 (aged 16)		(Peru) Sporting Cristal
3	DF	Ricardo Uribe	9 October 1988 (aged 16)		(Peru) Alianza Lima
4	DF	Christian Laura	13 February 1988 (aged 17)		(Peru) Sporting Cristal
5	DF	**Kerwin Peixoto**	21 February 1988 (aged 17)		(Peru) Alianza Lima
6	MF	Miguel Galliquio	22 August 1988 (aged 17)		(Peru) Sporting Cristal
7	DF	José Mesarina	15 November 1988 (aged 16)		(Peru) Alianza Lima
8	MF	**Josepmir Ballón**	21 March 1988 (aged 17)		(Peru) Cantolao
9	FW	**Daniel Chávez**	8 January 1988 (aged 17)		(Peru) Cantolao
10	MF	Walter Portugal	9 March 1988 (aged 17)		(Peru) Alianza Lima
11	MF	Jorge Álvarez	7 March 1988 (aged 17)		(Peru) Alianza Lima
12	GK	Gianfranco Castellanos	8 April 1988 (aged 17)		(Peru) Sporting Cristal
13	DF	Franklin Chávez	7 February 1988 (aged 17)		(Peru) Alianza Lima
14	FW	Jesús Rey	8 February 1988 (aged 17)		(Peru) Universitario
15	DF	**Carlos Zambrano**	10 July 1989 (aged 16)		(Peru) Cantolao
16	MF	Carlos Flores	9 January 1988 (aged 17)		(Peru) Alianza Lima
17	MF	**Gianfranco Espejo**	4 March 1988 (aged 17)		(Peru) Sporting Cristal
18	MF	Claudio Mendoza	17 February 1988 (aged 17)		(Peru) Sporting Cristal
19	FW	Adhemir Villavicencio	12 November 1988 (aged 16)		(Peru) Universitario
20	DF	Rómulo Laguna	24 May 1988 (aged 17)		(Peru) Universitario

=== Uruguay ===
Head coach: (Uruguay) Gustavo Ferrín

No.	Pos.	Player	Date of birth (age)	Caps	Club
1	GK	Yonatan Irrazábal	12 February 1988 (aged 17)		(Uruguay) Defensor Sporting
2	DF	Gary Kagelmacher	21 April 1988 (aged 17)		(Uruguay) Danubio
3	DF	Martín Díaz	17 March 1988 (aged 17)		(Uruguay) Defensor Sporting
4	DF	**Damián Suárez**	27 April 1988 (aged 17)		(Uruguay) Defensor Sporting
5	DF	Alejandro González	23 May 1988 (aged 17)		(Uruguay) Peñarol
6	DF	Maximiliano Arias	3 October 1988 (aged 16)		(Uruguay) Peñarol
7	MF	David Acosta	14 February 1988 (aged 17)		(Uruguay) Estudiantil
8	MF	Marcel Román	7 February 1988 (aged 17)		(Uruguay) Danubio
9	FW	Elías Figueroa	26 January 1988 (aged 17)		(Uruguay) Liverpool
10	MF	Gerardo Vonder	28 February 1988 (aged 17)		(Uruguay) Danubio
11	FW	Enzo Scorza	1 March 1988 (aged 17)		(Uruguay) Danubio
12	GK	Mauro Goicoechea	27 March 1988 (aged 17)		(Uruguay) Danubio
13	MF	Carlos Flores	4 February 1988 (aged 17)		(Uruguay) Defensor Sporting
14	MF	**Diego Arismendi**	25 January 1988 (aged 17)		(Uruguay) Nacional
15	MF	Anthony Paz	28 January 1988 (aged 17)		(Uruguay) Nacional
16	DF	Marcelo González	18 July 1988 (aged 17)		(Uruguay) Danubio
17	FW	Gustavo Aprile	10 March 1988 (aged 17)		(Uruguay) Danubio
18	DF	Juan Manuel Morales	19 December 1988 (aged 16)		(Uruguay) Montevideo Wanderers
19	FW	**Emiliano Alfaro**	28 April 1988 (aged 17)		(Uruguay) Liverpool
20	MF	Vicente Olivera	27 July 1988 (aged 17)		(Uruguay) Danubio
