= 1983 Kano State gubernatorial election =

1983 gubernatorial election in Kano State, Nigeria

- August 13, 1983
Nominee	Sabo Bakin Zuwo	Abubakar Rimi
Party	PRP	NPP
Running mate	Wada Abubakar Kiyawa	Mahmud Othman
Governor before election
Abubakar Rimi
PRP
Elected Governor
Sabo Bakin Zuwo
PRP

The 1983 Kano State gubernatorial election occurred on August 13, 1983. People's Redemption Party (PRP) candidate Sabo Bakin Zuwo won the election, defeating Nigerian People's Party (NPP) Abubakar Rimi.

== Results ==
Sabo Bakin Zuwo representing PRP won the election, defeating former governor Abubakar Rimi representing NPP. The election held on August 13, 1983.
