= Executive Council of Kano =

The Executive Council of Kano is a constitutional organ which exercises executive power in the Nigerian administrative unit of Kano State. It often make decisions via Orders in Council.

Executive councilors are informally called "state ministers or commissioners", the exception being the Council of the Third Republic which had "State secretaries". The Council is presided over by a Governor, Deputy Governor or a senior minister acting with the powers of the Governor.

== Councils ==
EXCOS	Chair	Span
First Exco	Audu Bako	1967-75
Second Exco	Sani Bello	1975-78
Third Exco	Abubakar Rimi	1979-80
Fourth Exco	Abubakar Rimi, Audu Dawakin Tofa	1980-83
Fifth	Sabo Bakin Zuwo	1983
Sixth	Kabiru Ibrahim Gaya	1992-93
Seventh	Rabiu Musa Kwankwaso	1999-2003
Eighth	Ibrahim Shekarau	2003-2007
Ninth	Ibrahim Shekarau	2007-2011
Tenth	Rabiu Musa Kwankwaso	2011-2015

== Inauguration Of New Executive Counsil ==
Rt. Hon. Abba Kabir Yusuf has approved the inauguration of Kano executive Counsil members which were scrutinised by the Kano State House of Assembly. The executive counsil members were assigned various portfolios as follows:

Names	Assigned portfolio
Aminu Abdulsalam Gwarzo	State Ministry of local governments
Baba Halilu Dantiye	Ministry of information and internal affairs
Haruna Dederi	Attorney-general/commissioners for justice
Abubakar Labaran Yusuf	Ministry Of Health
Umar Haruna Doguwa	Ministry Of Education
Danjuma Mahmud	Ministry Of Agriculture
