= Abdu Dawakin Tofa =

Governor of Kano State
- In office 20 May 1983 – October 1983
- Preceded by: Muhammadu Abubakar Rimi
- Succeeded by: Aliyu Sabo Bakin Zuwo

Personal details
- Born: 1932 Kwa, Dawakin Tofa
- Died: 27 February 2003
- Party: People's Redemption Party (1979 to 1983)

Alhaji Abdu Dawakin Tofa (1932– 2003) was a Nigerian politician who served as Governor of Kano between May 1983 and October 1983 during the Second Nigerian Republic. Prior to his governorship, he also served as the deputy to the preceding Governor of Kano, Muhammadu Abubakar Rimi, who held office from 1979 to 1983.

== Background ==
Abdu Dawakin Tofa earned a Higher Diploma from the School of Agriculture, Samaru, Zaria. From 1954 to 1960, he was an agricultural assistant in the former Borno Province. Tofa was a senior academic at the Audu Bako School of Agriculture, Dambatta when he was appointed Commissioner for Agriculture for Kano State in 1979. Later he became Commissioner for Special Duties in the cabinet of Governor Muhammadu Abubakar Rimi.

== Politics ==
When Deputy Governor Ibrahim Farouk was impeached, Tofa took his place. The Peoples Redemption Party (PRP) split into Santsi (Imodu) and Tabo Factions. He became the party Chairman of Kano Directorate Imodus Faction while Abdullahi Aliyu Sumaila was the party Secretary-General of the Imodus Faction Kano State Directorate.

When Rimi moved from the People's Redemption Party (PRP) to the Nigerian People's Party (NPP) following his fall out with his political mentor Aminu Kano, in preparation for the 1983 elections he resigned from office. Tofa became governor in May 1983 and held office until October 1983. He was instrumental in establishing the Kano Agricultural Research Development Authority – KNARDA – with the goal of "the total emancipation of the common man from hunger, disease, poverty and squalor".

== Corruption ==
After the military government of General Muhammadu Buhari took power in the 1983 Nigeria coup d'état, Tofa was put on trial by a special tribunal and was jailed for 21 years for offences that included receiving a ₦265,000 kickback for a ₦3.5 million contract awarded to Ashab construction company.
