= Sergio Ortega =

Sergio Ortega may refer to:

- Sergio Ortega (composer) (1938-2003), Chilean composer
- Sergio Ortega (footballer, born 1980), Spanish footballer
- Sergio Ortega (footballer, born 1988), Paraguayan footballer
- Sergio Ortega (footballer, born 1990), Panamanian footballer
