= Lemus =

Lemus is a surname that originated in Spain and may refer to:

== People ==
- Ángel Lemus
- Carlos Lemus
- Erick Lemus
- José María Lemus
- Juan Carlos Lemus
- Silvia Lemus

== See also ==
- Lemu (disambiguation)
