= Felipe Hernández =

Felipe Hernández may refer to:

- Felipe Hernández (footballer) (born 1988), Chilean footballer
- Felipe Enríquez Hernández (born 1969), Mexican diplomat and politician
- Felipe Hernandez (architect) (born 1971), Colombian-born architect in the United Kingdom
- Felipe Hernández (soccer) (born 1998), Colombian-American professional soccer player
