= Rodrigo Tapia =

Rodrigo Tapia may refer to:

- Rodrigo Tapia (footballer, born 1988), Chilean footballer
- Rodrigo Tapia (footballer, born 1994), Argentine footballer
