= Audu Bako =

Nigerian police officer, governor of Kano State (1924–1980)

Governor of Kano State
- In office 28 May 1967 – July 1975
- Preceded by: Hassan Katsina (Northern Region)
- Succeeded by: Sani Bello

Personal details
- Born: 24 November 1924 Kaduna, Northern Region, British Nigeria
- Died: 1980 (aged 55–56)
- Occupation: Police officer Administrator

Audu Bako (1924–1980) was a Nigerian police officer and the first Governor of Kano State during the military regime of General Yakubu Gowon after the state was formed from part of Northern Region.

== Background ==
Audo Bako was born in 1924 at the Kaduna police barracks. His father originally from Argungu, Kebbi State and had served in the police force for 36 years and was appointed as the District Head of Sabon Gari in Kaduna State. His mother Dije was from Mariri, Kumbotso Local Government, Kano State while his maternal grandmother was from Gezawa Local Government, Kano State. He was educated at the Kaduna Government School and the Zaria Middle School.

Bako enlisted in the Nigeria police force on 24 June 1942, became an instructor in police law at the Kaduna Police College, then prosecuting officer, and later was appointed deputy commissioner of police in charge of all Native Authority police in the former Northern Region.

== Governor of Kano State ==
Appointed military governor of the old Kano State in May 1967, Bako undertook reforms of the local governments which had been dominated by the traditional emirs. He sought to improve professionalism among local government employees while transferring some responsibilities to the State government. He said the reforms would strengthen the position of the Emirs in their traditional role as religious leaders.

Bako built most of modern Kano's landmark structures. The state Government Secretariat (Audu Bako Secretariat) and the Audu Bako School of Agriculture in Dambatta were named after him. The Kano Zoo is named after him as well.

Bako was a strong supporter of women's education. Using the teachings of Shehu Usman dan Fodio as justification, Bako established primary, secondary and teachers training colleges for women and children.

He produced the first plan for developing and promoting tourism in the state in 1967. He established the Trade and Industry Division under the Ministry of Finance in 1968.

In 1969 Bako started construction of the Bagauda Dam to supply the Kadawa Irrigation Project, precursor to the Kano Irrigation Project. Between 1970 and 1973, his administration built the much larger Tiga Dam, aiming to boost agricultural production through irrigation. He has been called the father of Kano's green revolution. However, although well-intentioned, the dams caused considerable problems in the downstream Hadejia-Nguru wetlands, and turned out to have negative net economic value. His Tomas Danbatta Water Supply Scheme was later abandoned, only to be rehabilitated in 2008 and used to provide drinking water to communities in Dambatta, Makoda, and Minjibir local government areas.

Hassan Lemu served as his Provincial Secretary, Audi Howediy as the Secretary to the Military Government (SMG), Bashari Gumel as the Principal Secretary, Muhammadu Ibrahim served as Secretary to the Kano State Executive Council 1968–1969, Sabo Sarki Mohammed as Press Secretary, Ibrahim Bello and Isyaku Umar Tofa served in the post of Principal Private Secretary, the Personal Secretaries were Abba Dutse, Babagana Adamu and Umaru Abdulwahab, the Chief Protocol included Ali Ahmed and Ismaila Yaro Dandago.

=== List of course/Departments in Audu Bako College Of Agriculture Danbatta (AUDUBAKO) ===
Agricultural Engineering / Technology

Agricultural Technology

Animal Health And Production Technology

Computer Science

Fisheries Technology

Forestry Technology

Wildlife and Eco-Tourism

Horticultural Technology

Production Tech

== Legacy ==
Bako retired in 1975 after the coup that brought General Murtala Muhammed to power, and began farming at kwanar marke village (less than 30 kilometers from Gusau) along Gusau to Sokoto road in present Zamfara State. He died in 1980, leaving a widow and eleven children. After his death, the Tiga dam was renamed the Audu Bako dam. The Audu Bako prize is awarded each year to the winner of the Kano International Polo Tournament. Bako was widely respected, and was considered an example of moral integrity.
