= Sani Bello =

Nigerian statesman and military administrator (Born 1942)

Colonel Sani Bello

Governor of Kano State
- In office July 1975 – September 1978
- Preceded by: Audu Bako
- Succeeded by: Ishaya Aboi Shekari

Personal details
- Born: 27 November 1942 (age 83) Kontagora, Northern Region, British Nigeria (now Kontagora, Nigeria)
- Children: Abubakar Sani Bello
- Education: Government College Bida
- Alma mater: NMTC; RMA Sandhurst

Military service
- Allegiance: Nigeria
- Branch: Nigerian Army
- Service years: 1965–1979
- Rank: Colonel
- Conflict: Nigerian Civil War

Sani Bello (born 27 November 1942) is a Nigerian statesman and military administrator who served as Governor of Kano State from 1975 to 1978. After his retirement, he amassed an enormous fortune through investments in oil, telecommunications and electricity; going on to establish the Sani Bello Foundation.

== Early life ==
Sani Bello was born on 27 November 1942 in Kontagora, the only child of Bello Mustapha and Hajiya Abu. He received Islamic education, and attended Central Primary School, Kotangora from 1950 to 1957.

From 1957 to 1962 Bello attended Government College Bida, alongside classmates Ibrahim Babangida, Abdulsalami Abubakar, Mamman Vatsa, Mohammed Magoro, Garba Duba, Gado Nasko and Mohammed Sani Sami.

== Military career ==
Sani Bello joined the Nigerian Army in December 1962. Alongside his childhood friends, he enrolled as an officer cadet at the Nigerian Military Training College (now Nigerian Defence Academy) in Kaduna before proceeding to the Royal Military Academy, Sandhurst where he was commissioned as a second lieutenant of the Nigerian Army in July 1965. He returned to Nigeria and was posted to 1st Battalion in Enugu as a Platoon Commander. He progressed in the Army, holding various command posts and rising through the ranks, including Aide-de-camp (ADC) to Major General Johnson Aguiyi-Ironsi, Nigeria's first military head of state.

Following the outbreak of the Nigerian Civil War, Bello was a training officer at the 6th Battalion, Ikeja before he was posted to Bonny as the Sector Commander. During the war, Bello was wounded at Bonny and evacuated to Lagos for treatment, in Lagos, he served as a staff officer at the Lagos Garrison division. He was later posted to active commands including serving as Commander of the Oshodi Resettlement Center and Rear Commander of defunct Third Marine Commando division under then Colonel Olusegun Obasanjo. He was also General Staff Officer and Assistant Quartermaster General of the 3rd Division.

From 1971 to 1974, he was Deputy Adjutant General of the Nigerian Army before becoming the Commanding Officer of the 81 Battalion, Kaduna. Commanding the 81 Battalion in Kaduna, Bello participated in the 1975 Nigerian coup d'état which bought General Murtala Mohammed to power. He was later appointed military governor of Kano State under General Murtala Mohammed and an ex-officio member of the Supreme Military Council. In 1979, following the rise of the Second Nigerian Republic he was retired from the Nigerian Army as a Principal Staff Officer.

== Military governor ==
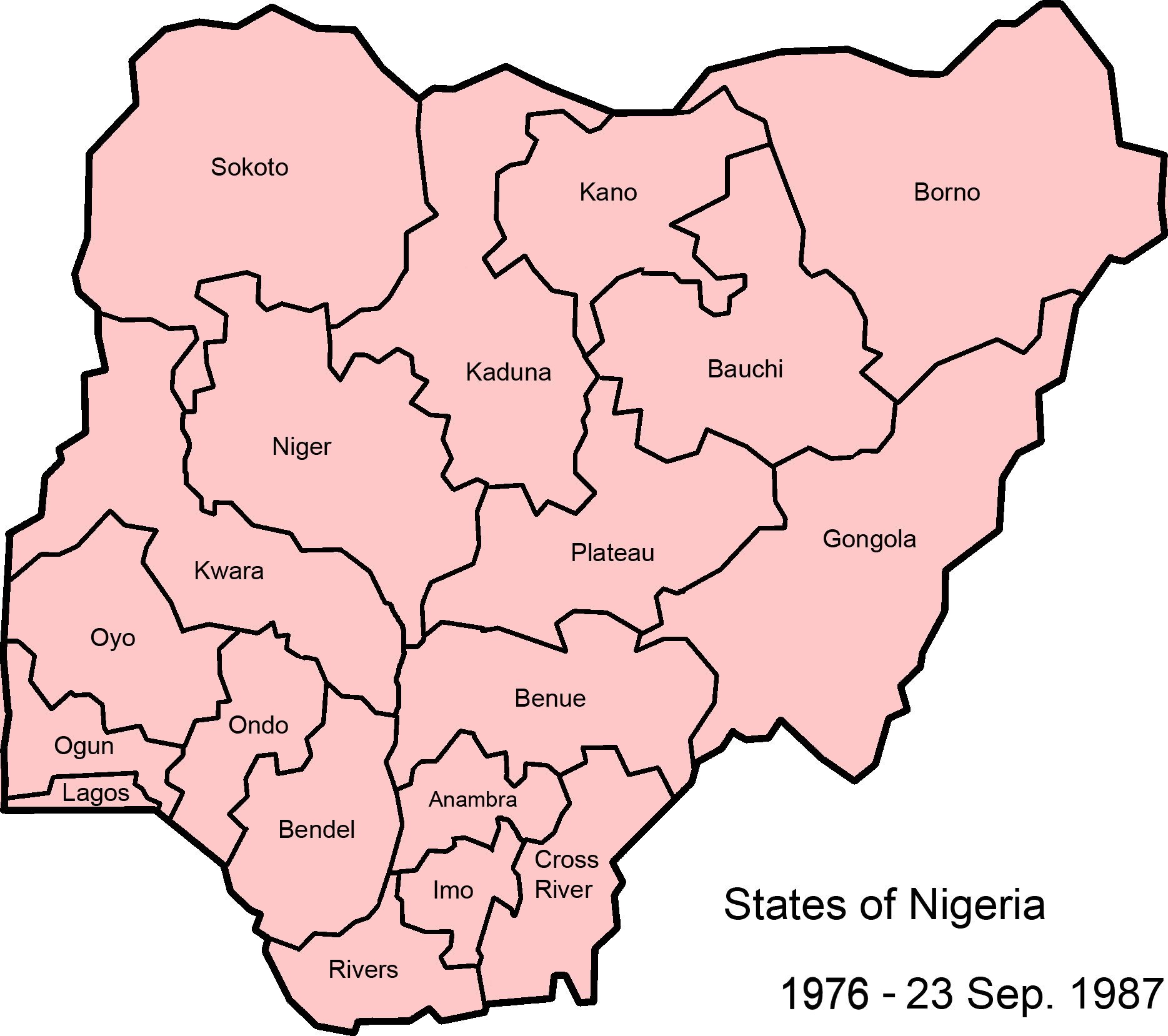
Colonel Sani Bello was military governor of old Kano State (incl. Jigawa State) in 1975

Colonel Sani Bello was appointed military governor of the old Kano State (now Kano State and Jigawa State) from 1975 to 1978. His administration was tasked by the Federal Military Government to implement: local government reform and universal primary education. Local government reform led to the creation of 20 local government areas in Kano.

During his tenure he focused on commerce, rural roads, electrification and primary/secondary education. In 1976, he established science colleges to train Kano State residents and give them the opportunity to qualify for science courses at the university level and also to climb to middle and top level grades in the government.

His government was staffed by competent civil servants. Balarabe Ismail and Alfa Wali were Secretary to the Military Government (SMG): Balarabe Ismail served from 1975 to 1976, while Alfa Wali from 1976 to 1978. Abdullahi Aliyu Sumaila and Abdu Sambo served as the scribes (Secretary to the Kano State Executive Council), Umaru Abdulwahab and Mohammed Sagagi served as Principal Secretary to the Governor.

== Later career ==
After retirement in 1979, Colonel Bello held various part-time appointments as a chairman of Niger State Green Revolution, Niger State NYSC, Niger State Polytechnic and Niger State Science and Technical School. Sani Bello Science College Dawakin Kudu, Kano, a renowned public science school under the Science and Technical Schools Board, Kano state was also named after him in the 2010s, formerly called "Dawakin Kudu Science College, Kano". He served as the Chairman of Nigerian Table Tennis Federation (a pastime of his) and led the national team to the Commonwealth Table Tennis Championships and 1983 World Table Tennis Championships in Tokyo. He later served as the Nigerian High Commissioner (Ambassador) to Zimbabwe from 1984 to 1986.

On his return home from Zimbabwe, Colonel Bello cultivated clients, business associates and friends who have extended his business interests in: banking, insurance, construction, and telecommunications. He maintains personal and business links with his childhood friends General Ibrahim Babangida and General Abdulsalami Abubakar. In 1993, he co-founded Amni, a national oil and gas exploration and production company with interests in Ketu and Okoro oilfield. He is currently the Chairman of Dantata and Sawoe Construction Company Limited and Mainstream Energy Solutions Limited. He is also the Proprietor of Mustafa Comprehensive School in Kontagora. His hobbies include table tennis and chess.
