= Rifkatu Adamu Chidawa =

Commissioner for Tourism and Culture, Niger State

Ministry of Tourism and Culture (Niger State)
- Governor: Sani Bello

Personal details
- Born: Niger State
- Education: Ahmadu Bello University; University of Abuja

Rifkatu Adamu Chidawa (born 18 February 1956) was the Commissioner for Tourism and Culture, Niger State, Nigeria from 2019 to 2023.

== Early life ==
Chidawa was born on 18 February 1956 in Diko of Gurara Local Government area of Niger State.

== Education ==
Chidawa began primary school in January 1962, then went to Government Girls Secondary School, Minna. She later obtained her National Certificate of Education in 1981. Chidawa was posted to Government Day Secondary School Suleja, Niger state for one year National Youth Service Corps programme in 1981. She obtained her first degree certificate in education (B.Ed.) from Ahmadu Bello University. She later went to University of Abuja in 1999 for a master's degree in education administration and planning.

== Career ==
Chidawa started her career as a teacher. She headed various secondary schools in Abuja and Niger state. Later on, she was appointed as Commissioner of Tourism and Culture. Chidawa started a programme to perform free cancer screenings in the Gurara Local Government Area of Niger State.

== Personal life ==
She is married with children.
