= Patricio Salas =

Patricio Salas is the name of:

- Patricio Salas (footballer, born 1988), Chilean footballer
- Patricio Salas (footballer, born 2004), Mexican footballer
