= Okoro Oilfield =

Oilfield

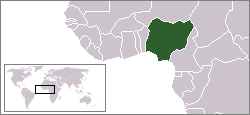
- Country: Nigeria
- Block: OML 112
- Offshore/onshore: Offshore
- Operator: AMNI
- Partners: N/A

Field history
- Discovery: 1973
- Start of production: June 2008
- Abandonment: 2025

Production
- Current production of oil: 18,872 barrels per day (~9.404×10^{5} t/a)
- Year of current production of oil: 2009
- Estimated oil in place: 130 million barrels (~1.8×10^{7} t)
- Producing formations: Agbada Formation

Okoro Oilfield is an oilfield located 12 kilometres (7.5 mi) offshore Nigeria in an average water depth of 14 metres (46 ft) in the eastern Niger Delta. The field is located in OML 112 block (formerly OPL 469). The Okoro Oilfield is operated and owned entirely by Amni.

== History ==
Okoro was discovered in 1973 by Japan Petroleum with the drilling of Okoro-1 well. The well penetrated the two oil bearing sands between 4,900 and 5,500 feet (1,700 m) in the Agbada Formation and was logged and tested. One of oil zone flowed 1,500 bbl/d (240 m^{3}/d) and 1,000 BW and well was deemed commercial discovery. Okoro-2 follow up appraisal well was drilled in Nov 1974 by Japan Petroleum at the eastern extension of the field but it was water wet. Okoro-2 appraisal well confirmed the presence of both reservoir sands. The field is covered by good quality 3D seismic data which was acquired by Mobil Corporation.

Amni International Petroleum Development Company Limited (AMNI) was originally granted oil prospecting licence (OPL) 469 on a sole risk basis on 24 August 1993 for a term of 5 years by Nigeria's Ministry of Petroleum and Mineral Resources as part of the Nigerian Government indigenous licensing programme. As a result of the successful implementation of its work programme, OPL 469 was converted to Oil Mining Lease (OML) 112 for a term of 25 years in 1998. OML 112 covers approximately an area of 437 square kilometres (169 sq mi).

Amni entered into Agreements with Total S.A. through its subsidiary TOTAL E&P Nigeria Limited (formerly Elf Petroleum Nigeria Limited) in 2005, under which Total acquired a 40% interest in OML 112. TOTAL relinquished both its right to participate in and any future right of re-entry into the development of Okoro/ Setu Fields (Setu and Ima are other fields located in OML 112), allowing Amni, in March 2006, to enter into agreements with Afren Energy Resources, a wholly owned subsidiary of Afren Plc, for the Okoro/Setu (exclusive area) fields development.

== Appraisal ==
An appraisal well Okoro -3 was spudded on 14 October 2006 by the Seadrill 7 jack-up rig on the Okoro Field. The well was drilled 1.5 kilometres (0.93 mi) east of the Okoro-1 discovery well. Okoro-3 was the first well to be drilled by Afren/Amni on OML 112. The well was drilled as a vertical well and reached total depth of 6,500 feet (2,000 m) in the Miocene Agbada Formation. The well confirmed the eastern extension of the field and also the hydrocarbon contacts seen in both sand formations in the initial discovery. A full suite of modern log and pressure data was acquired and the well was successfully tested.

Following completion of testing operations, a second appraisal well Okoro 3 ST was drilled in December 2006. The well was drilled as a deviated sidetrack from the Okoro-3 wellbore and was designed to further evaluate both reservoirs and provide greater control for planning future horizontal production wells. The Okoro-3 side track was drilled at a maximum inclination of 55 degrees to the west of Okoro-3 and reached a total depth of 6,870 ft (2,090 m). A full suite of pressure and log data was acquired and, as planned, the well was not tested. A total of 70 feet (21 m) (True Vertical Depth) of net oil pay was encountered, which was greater than expected at this location.

This additional penetration of the Okoro field assisted in planning the horizontal wells required to develop the field. As a result of the two well appraisal drilling programme, Afren enhanced the proved and probable reserves cases on the Okoro-Setu development. NSAI reserves was upgraded to 24.8 million barrels (3.94×10^{6} m^{3}) (gross 2P as at 31 December 2009) from 15.5 million barrels (2.46×10^{6} m^{3})(as at 30 June 2009) for Okoro field and 30 million barrels (4.8×10^{6} m^{3}) for combined Okoro and Setu fields. Reservoir modelling suggests a recovery factor >30% is achievable from 5 wells.

== Development ==
In June 2006, Afren signed a Financing and Production Sharing and Technical Services Agreement with Amni for participation in the development of Okoro and Setu. Under the terms of the agreement, Afren will finance the development and appraisal programme. Afren will recover these costs with an uplift on its capital, from over 90 per cent of the barrels produced, net of operating costs and royalties. Following cost recovery, Afren and Amni will share the production equally.

A Field Development Plan for the Okoro and Setu Field development was submitted to the Government of Nigeria in January 2007. In April 2007, the Field Development Plan (FDP) was approved by the Department of Petroleum Resources in Nigeria and the partners secured a Floating Production Storage and Offtake Vessel (FPSO). On 21 March 2007, Afren plc announced the signing of a fully underwritten US$200 million debt facility to finance the development of the Okoro – Setu project.

In January 2008, development drilling commenced from a subsea template using Transocean's Adriatic-6 jack-up rig. The 10-point fixed mooring system for the FPSO vessel was installed in January and the Armada Perkasa arrived in March 2008 and was hooked up to the anchor system. In May 2008, the wellhead platform was installed and flowline connections made.

== Production ==
First Oil was achieved during June 2008 when production from the first two production wells drilled commenced at a rate in excess of 3,000 barrels per day (480 m^{3}/d) of oil of 27° API oil from each well. A further five wells were subsequently drilled, completed and brought onstream. The wells drilled were a mixture of horizontal and highly deviated penetrations of the reservoir intervals. Reservoir quality was typically at the higher end of expectations.

Production in 2009 averaged 18,872 barrels per day (3,000.4 m^{3}/d), ahead of pre development expectations for that period. This is as a result of better reservoir quality than incorporated into the original field simulation model, good aquifer support and water breakthrough from the existing production wells occurring much later than predicted. At least two infill targets have also been identified and will be drilled in 2010, adding reserves and incremental production volumes. By the end of 2009, the Okoro field had produced 8.1 million barrels (1.29 million cubic metres) of oil.
