= Sabo Bakin Zuwo =

Former Governor of Kano State (1983)

Aliyu Sabo Bakin Zuwo

Governor of Kano State
- In office 1 October 1983 – 31 December 1983
- Deputy: Wada Abubakar
- Preceded by: Abdu Dawakin Tofa
- Succeeded by: Hamza Abdullahi

Personal details
- Born: December 31, 1934 Kano, Northern Region, British Nigeria (now Kano, Nigeria)
- Died: February 15, 1989 (aged 54) Kano, Nigeria
- Party: People's Redemption Party (1979 to 1983)

Aliyu Sabo Bakin Zuwo (December 31, 1934 – February 15, 1989) was a Nigerian politician of the People's Redemption Party (PRP). He was a Senator in the Second Nigerian Republic and was elected governor of Kano State in October 1983, holding office briefly until the military coup on 31 December 1983 that brought General Muhammadu Buhari to power.

== Background ==
Zuwo's origins could be traced to Barebari from Kanem–Bornu Empire where his ancestors migrated to Kano, where he was born and raised. His father's name is Abubakar, his grand father's name is Yusuf and his great-grandfather's name is Ibrahim; his mother Salamatu is from Gunduwawa in Minjibir Local Government.

== Early political career ==
He had no formal education, but said that he attended "Mallam Aminu Kano Political School, Sudawa, Kano." Zuwo enrolled himself at the age of sixteen at Shahuchi Primary School Adult Literacy Class in 1950 to 1954; among his tutors was Maitama Sule. Zuwo also attended Igbo Community School Sabon Gari Kano and a course on Local Government administration at the Institute of Administration Kongo Campus of Ahmadu Bello University. He missed the opportunity to acquire western education at an early age but was able to acquire a little of it when he became an adult. In the run-up to the Second Republic, Zuwo, an outspoken politician, was said to have made effective use of the radio more than any other politician in Northern Nigeria. Elected to the Senate in 1979, Zuwo sponsored more bills than any other senator.

== Governor of Kano ==
In the 1983 Kano State gubernatorial elections, he defeated former governor Abubakar Rimi, who had resigned earlier that year and defected to the Nigerian People's Party (NPP). One of Zuwo's first acts as governor was to remove all the Emir's installed by Rimi. In a popular gesture, he closed down the Palace Cinema in Kano, which had become a venue for young men to take drugs and engage in sex, and converted it to a clinic.

== Corruption ==
He was arrested by the military regime of General Muhammadu Buhari which came to power in a coup on 31 December 1983. N3.4 million was said to be found "stacked up" in Zuwo's home when it was searched by the new military government. In 1985, a Special Military Tribunal found him guilty of three charges and sentenced him to 23 years in jail for each offence but they would run concurrently.

== Death ==
He died in 1989. Before his death he had aligned with the People's Front of Nigeria led by General Shehu Musa Yar'Adua together with some Kano State politicians, such as his deputy Governor Wada Abubakar, Abdullahi Aliyu Sumaila, and Rabiu Kwankwaso.
