= Lemu =

Lemu may refer to:

== People ==
- Ahmed Lemu (1929–2020), Nigerian scholar
- Aisha Lemu (died 2019), Nigerian scholar
- Hassan Lemu, Nigerian politician
- Massa Lemu, Malawi artist

== Places ==
- Lemu, Finland
