= Audu Bako Zoological Garden =

Zoological garden in Kano, Nigeria

Coordinates: 11°58′05″N 8°31′32″E

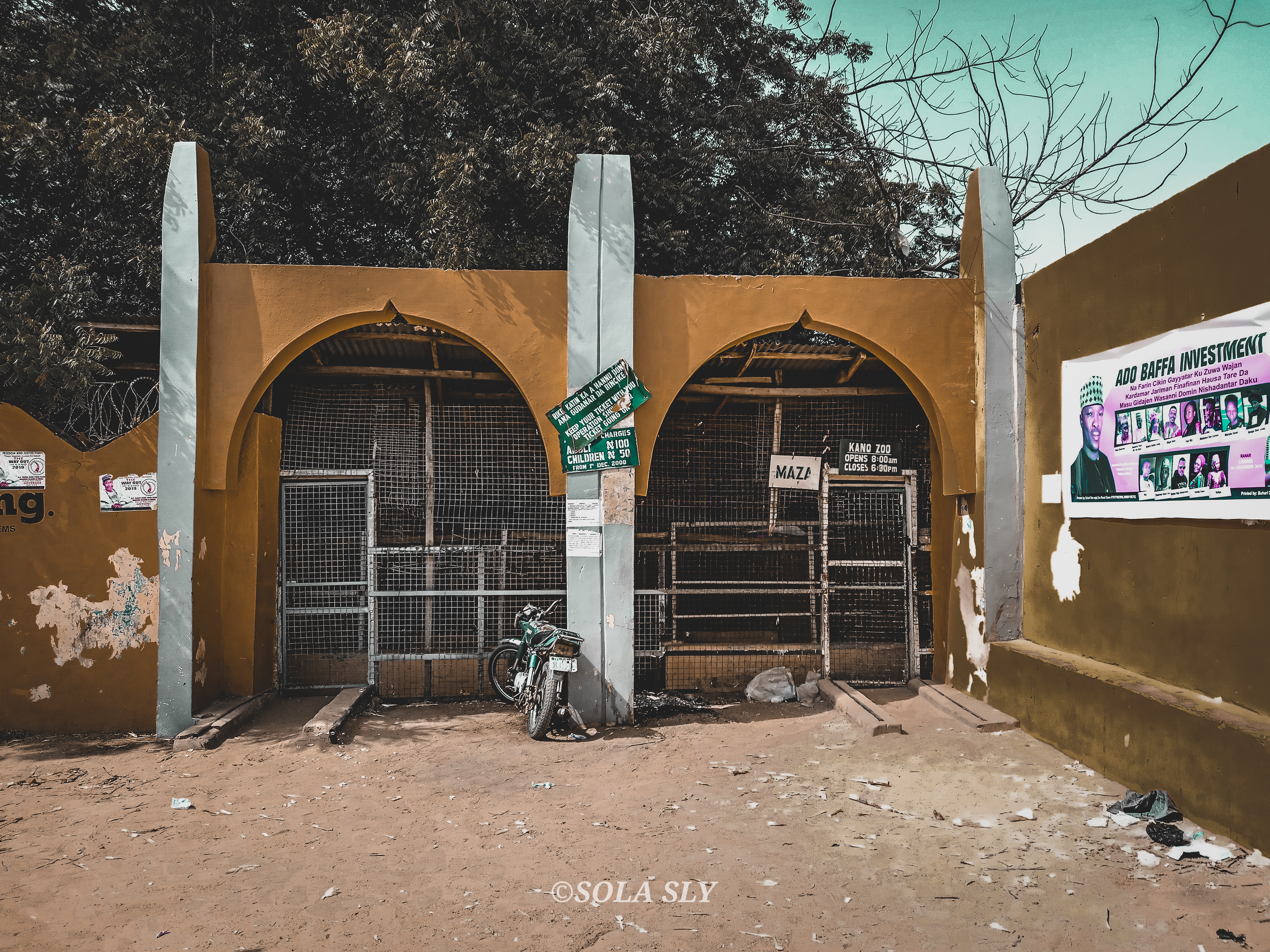
- Entrance
- Interactive map of Audu Bako Zoological Garden
- Date opened: 13 November 1972
- Location: Zoo Road, Kano, Kano State, Nigeria
- Land area: 46 ha (110 acres)
- No. of animals: 70+
- No. of species: 70+

The Audu Bako Zoological Garden, also known as the Kano Zoological Park, is a zoological garden located in Kano, Kano State, Nigeria. It is one of the oldest and largest zoological gardens in Nigeria, covering an area of approximately 46 hectares (110 acres).

== History ==
The Audu Bako Zoological Garden was established in 1972 and is home to a wide variety of animals, including lions, zebras, giraffes, elephants, monkeys, crocodiles, and various species of birds. The park also features a botanical garden with a variety of plant species. The park was named after Audu Bako, a former governor of Kano State who played a significant role in the establishment of the park. The name "Audu Bako Zoological Garden" is often used interchangeably with "Kano Zoological Garden" or "Kano Zoological Park."

== Tourist attraction ==
The park is a popular tourist attraction in Kano, attracting both locals and visitors from other parts of Nigeria and beyond. It is open to visitors every day of the week, from 9:00 am to 6:00 pm.

== Challenges ==
In recent years, the Kano Zoological Garden has faced some challenges, including inadequate funding, poor management, and a lack of proper facilities for the animals. However, efforts are being made to improve the park, including plans to build a new animal clinic and upgrade the existing facilities.

== Gallery ==
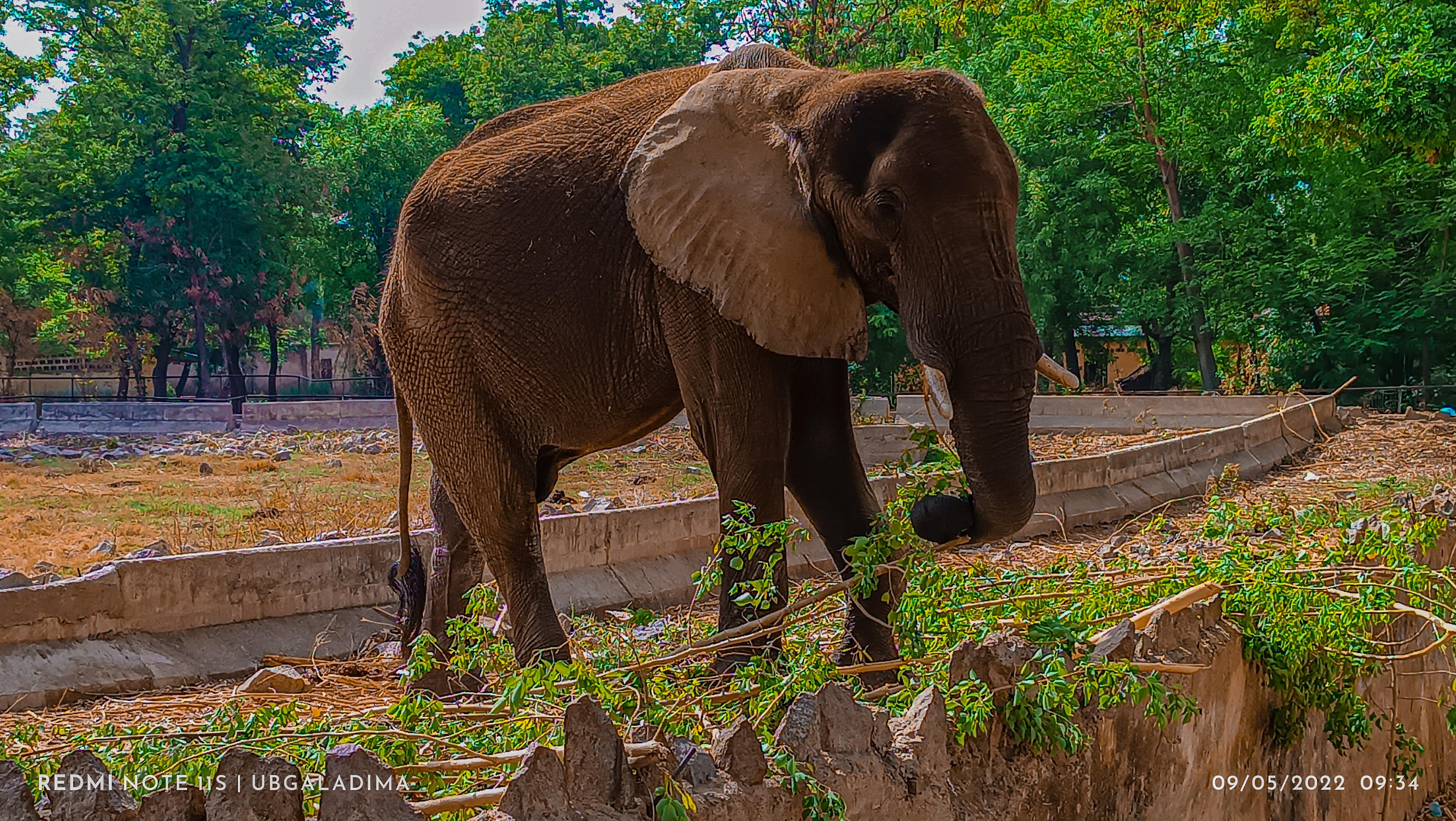
Elephant at Kano zoo

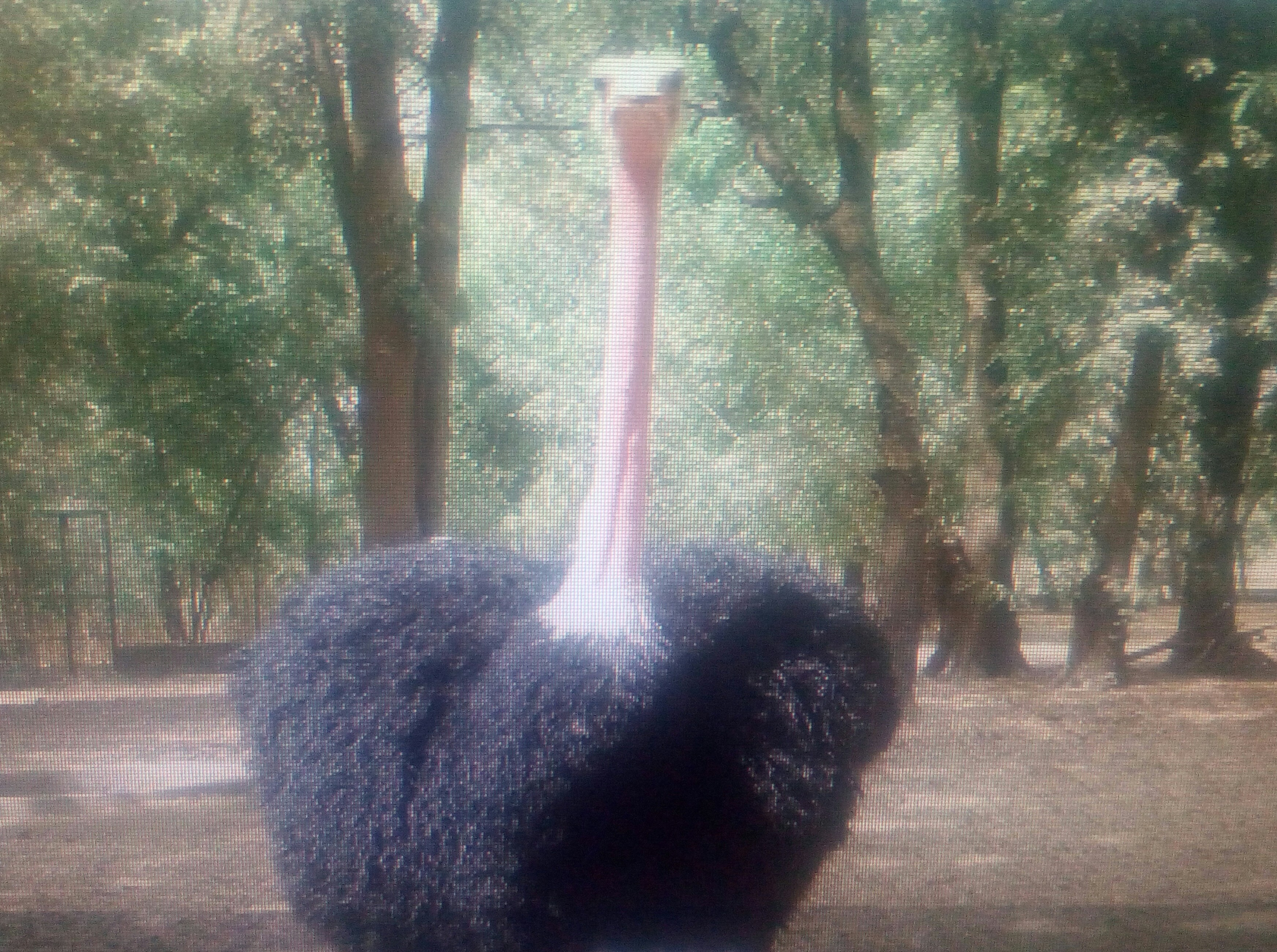
Ostrich at Kano Zoo

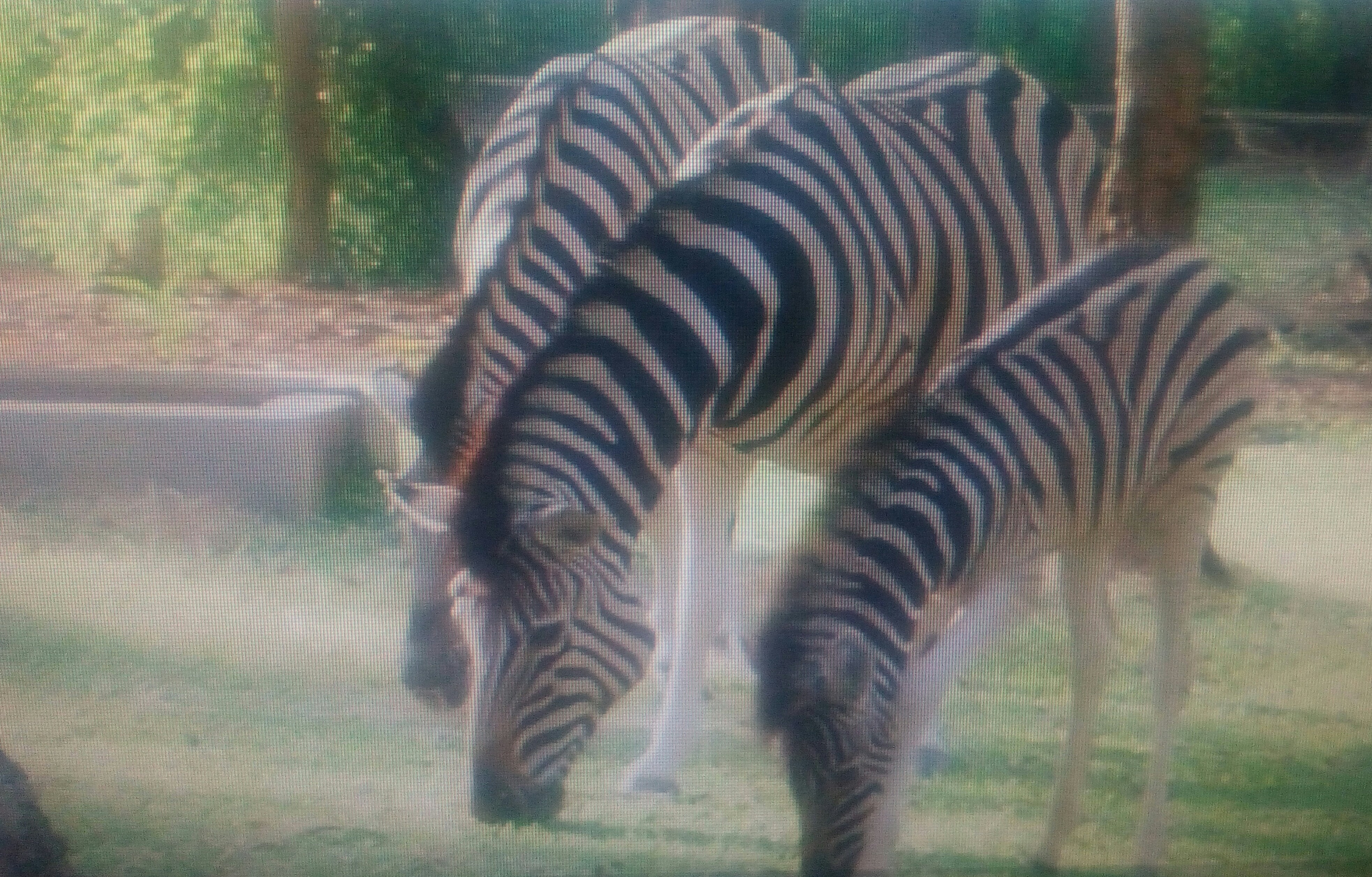
Zebras

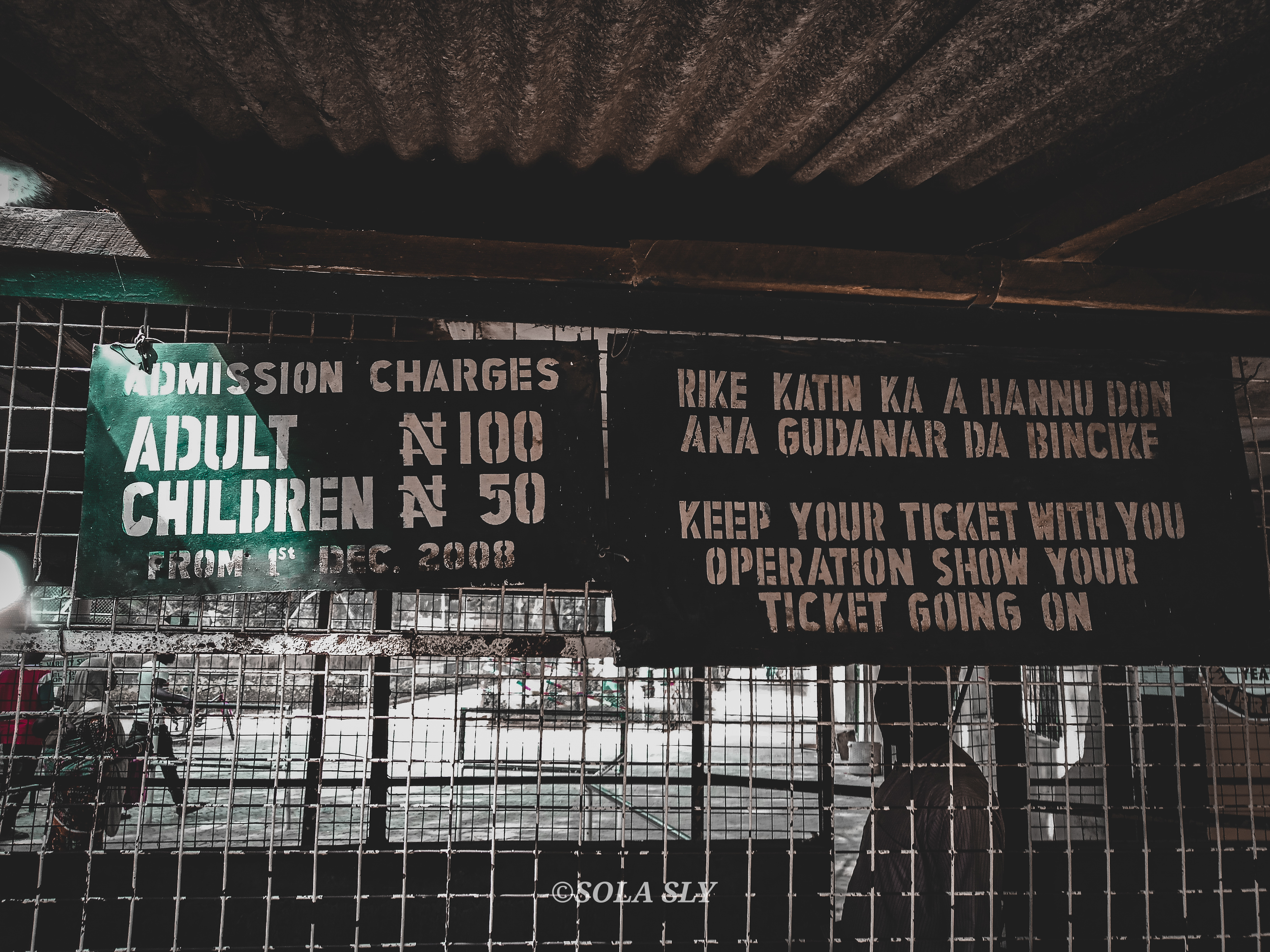
The entrance

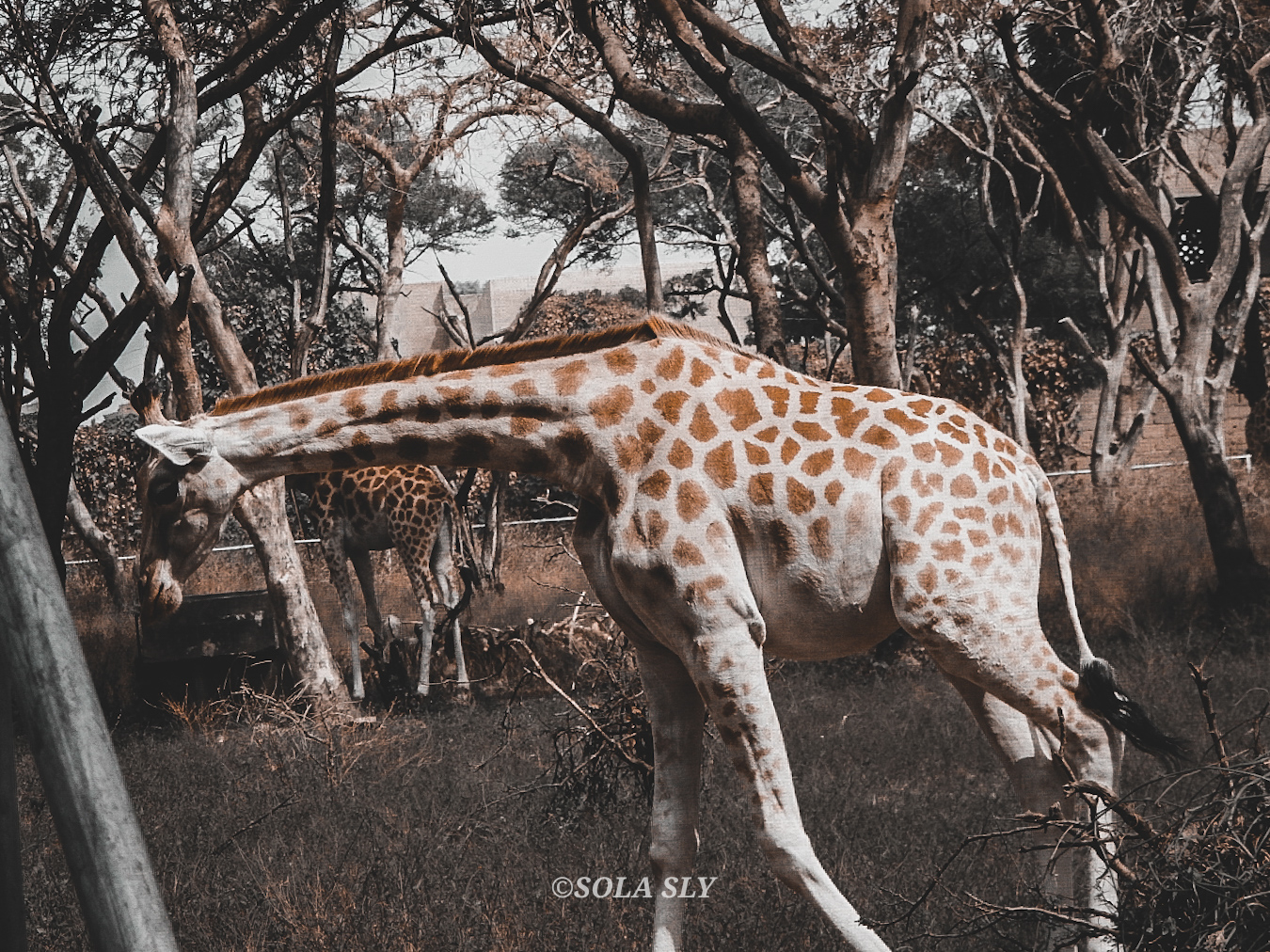
Giraffe

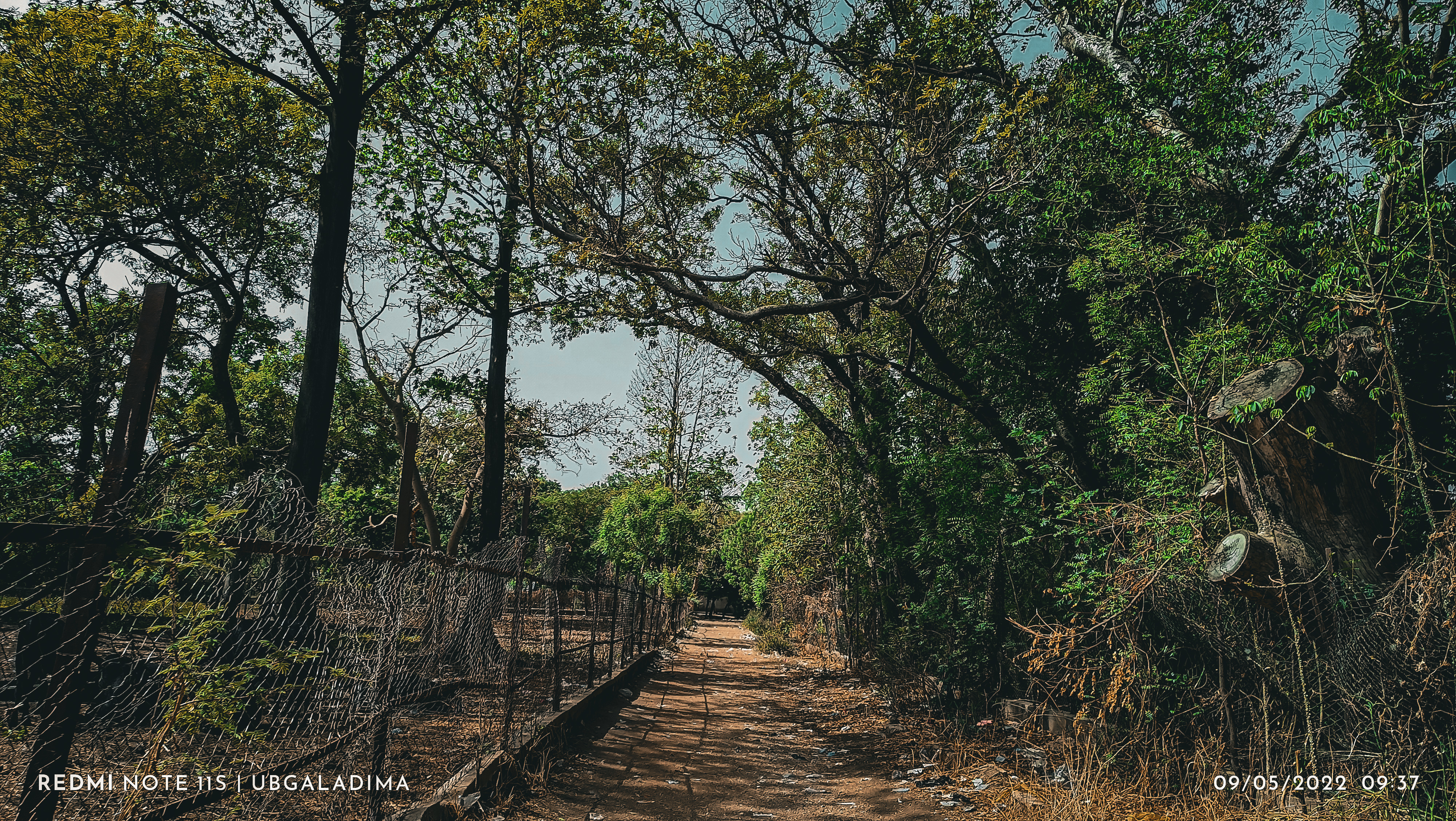
Some areas

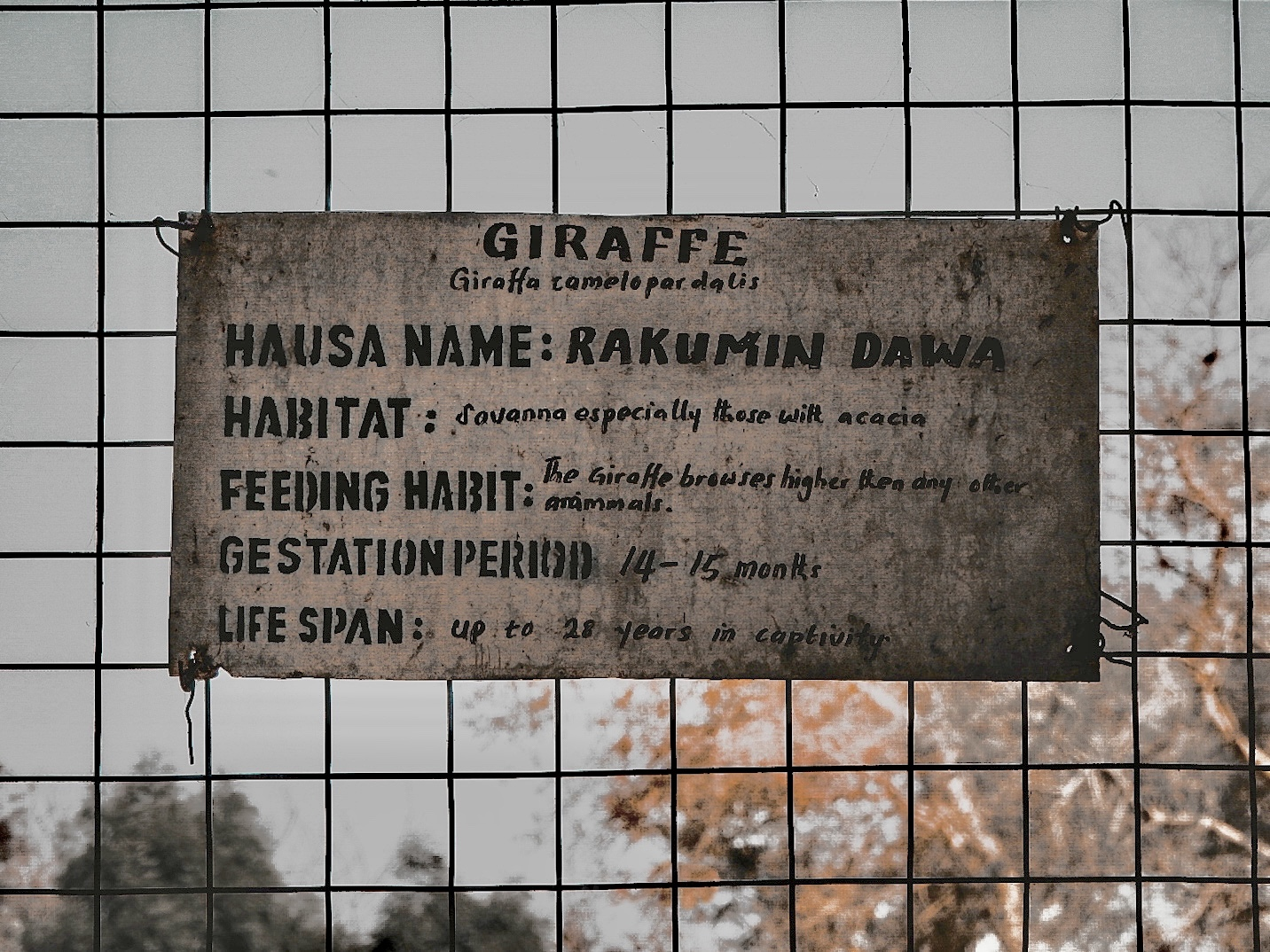
Giraffe description sign

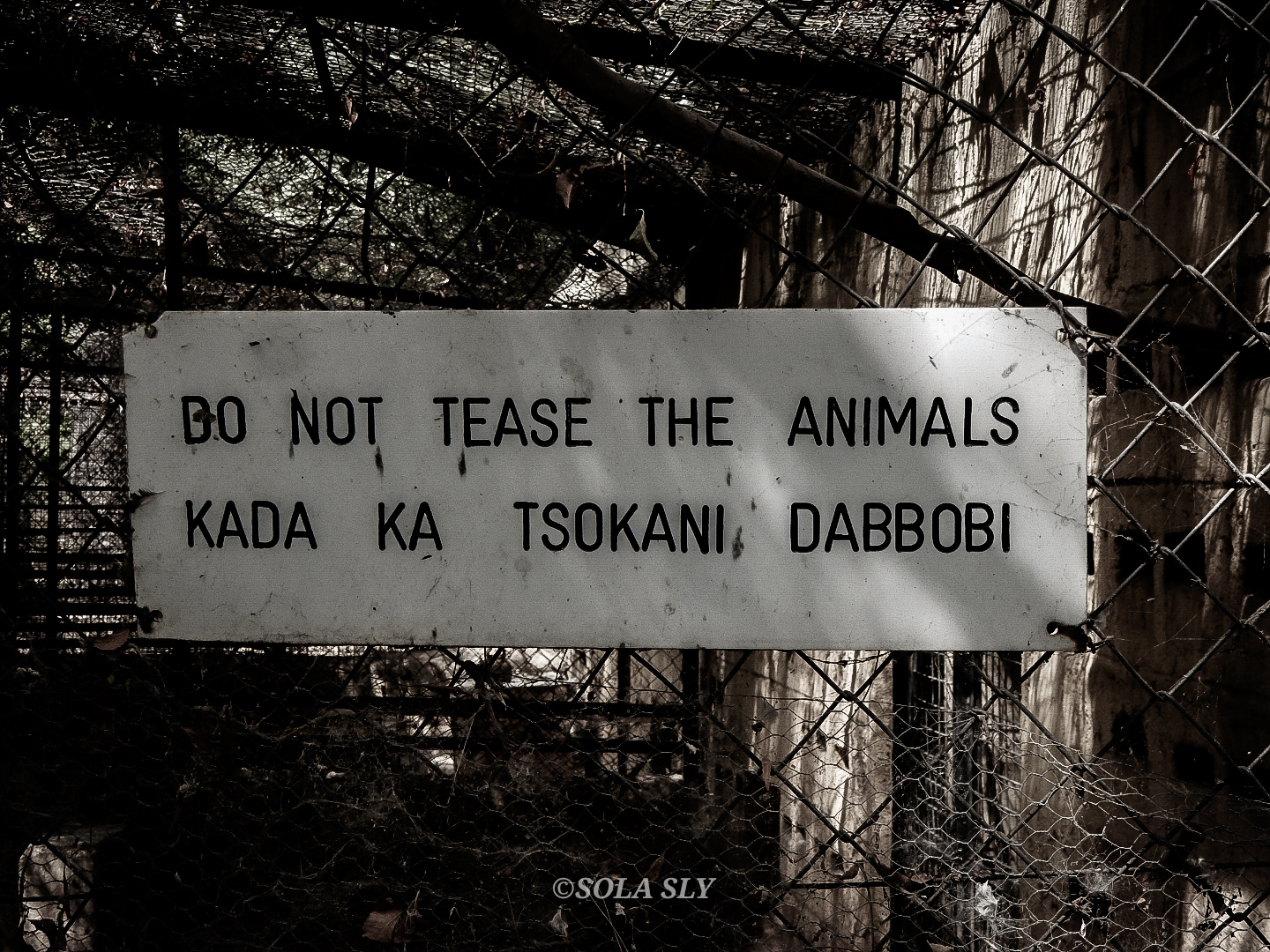

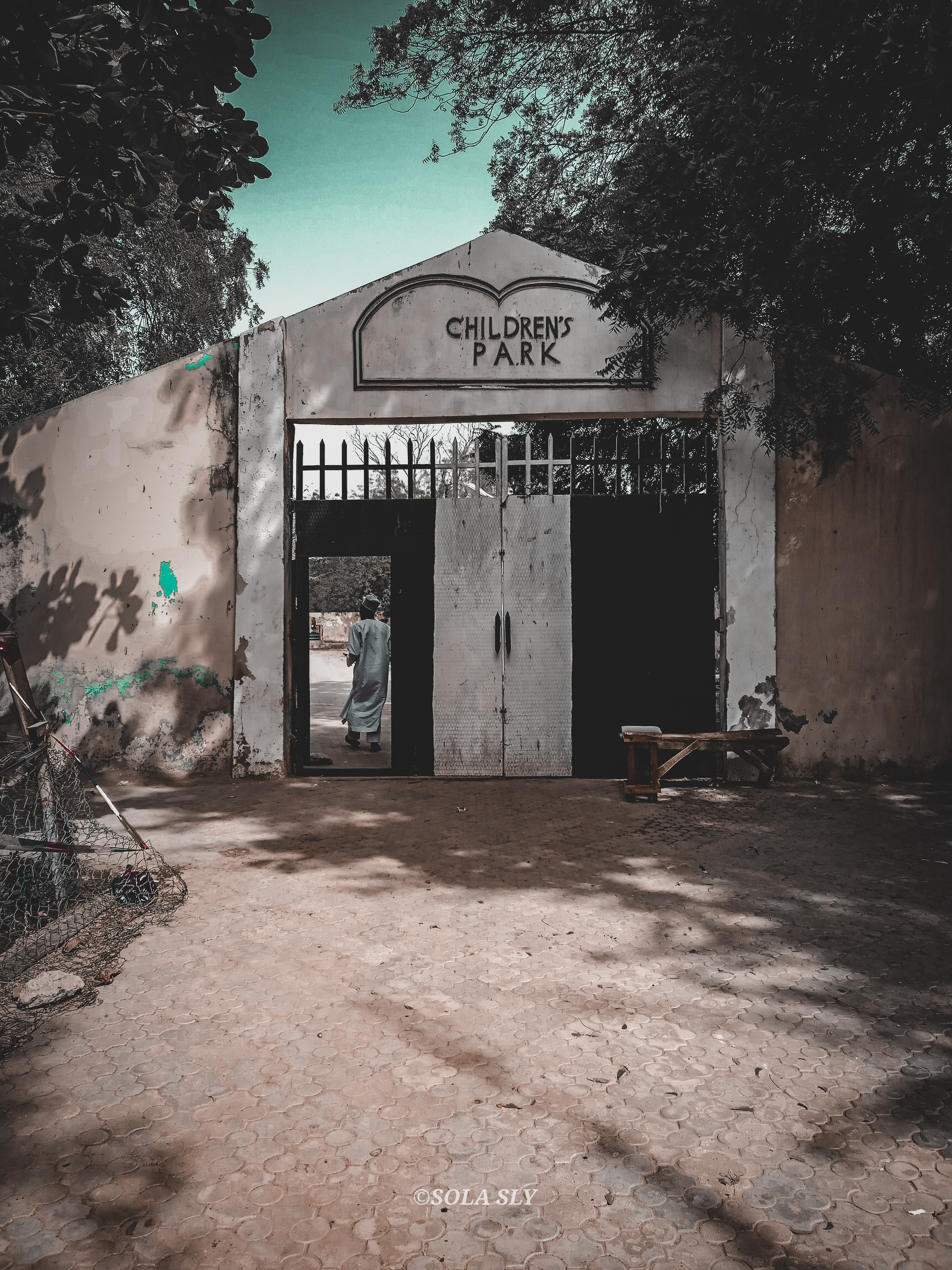
Children play park

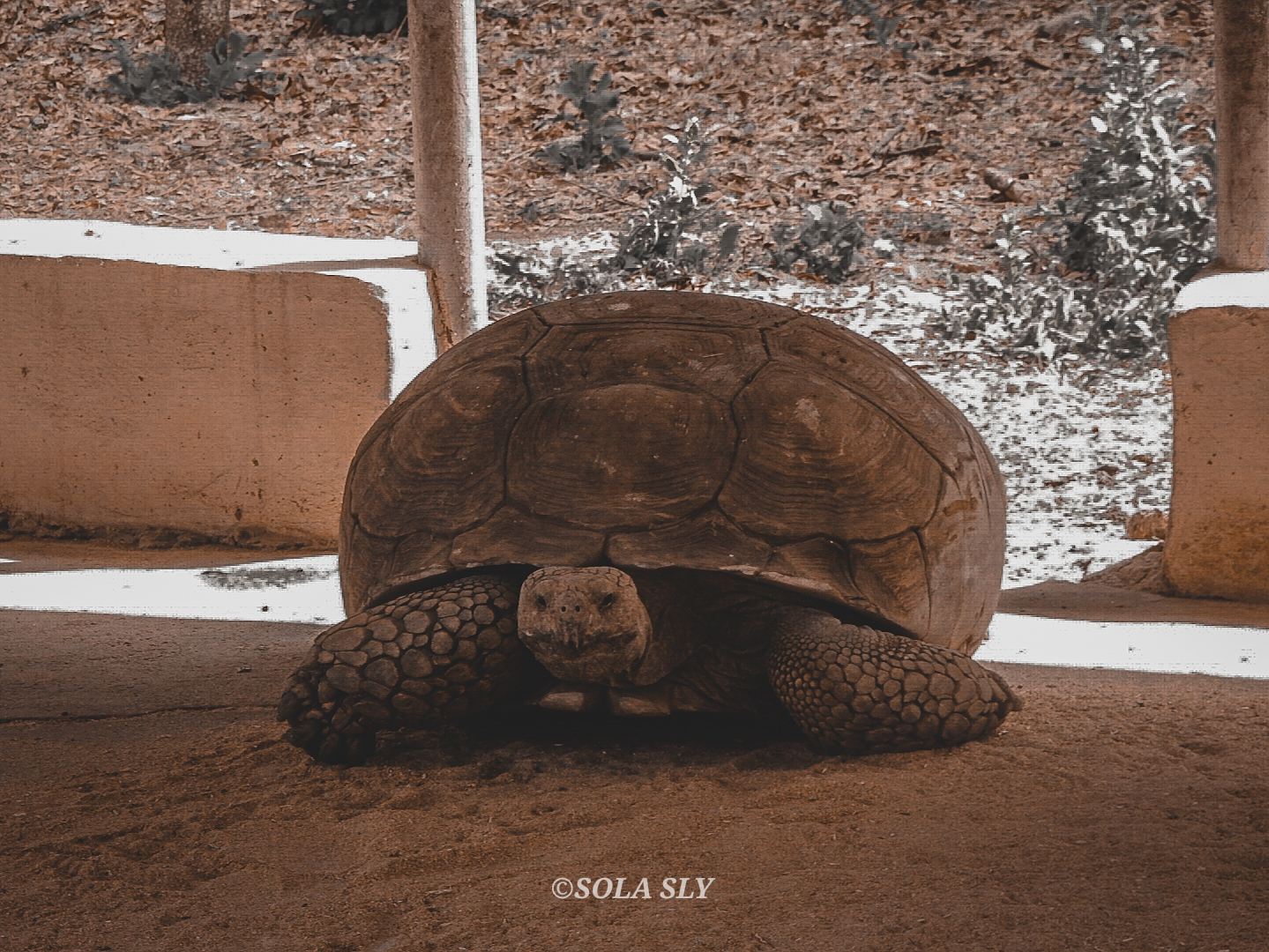
Giant tortoise

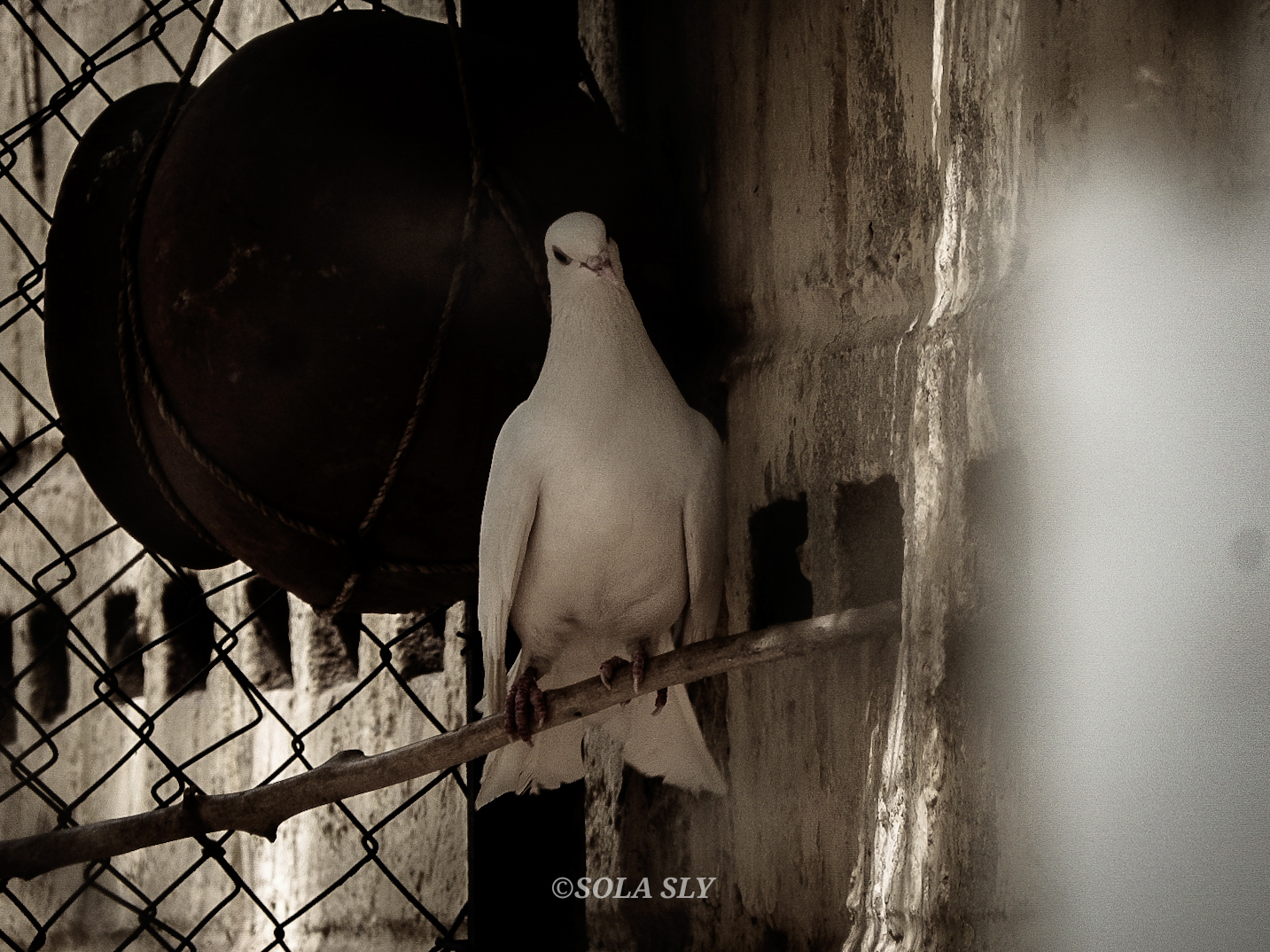
Dove
