= Ishaya Shekari =

Air Vice Marshal Ishaya Aboi Shekari OON
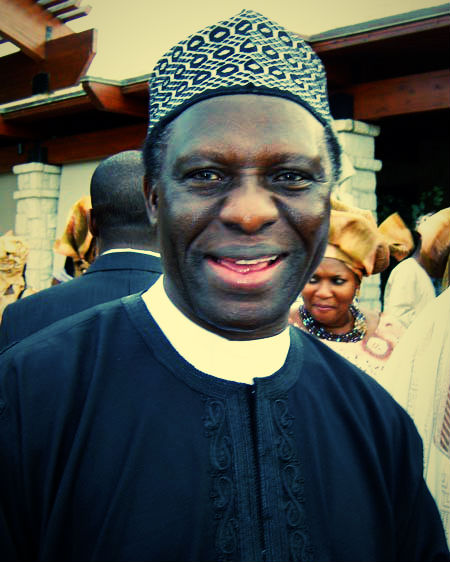
- Shekari at an occasion in 2016

Governor of Kano State
- In office September 1978 – October 1979
- Preceded by: Sani Bello
- Succeeded by: Abubakar Rimi

Personal details
- Born: 30 August 1940 (age 86) Taligan, Zangon Kataf, Northern Region, British Nigeria (now Zangon Kataf, Nigeria)
- Party: Social Democratic Party (1989 to 1993)
- Children: Four
- Education: Nigerian Military Training College
- Profession: Military officer Businessman

Military service
- Allegiance: Nigeria
- Branch/service: Nigerian Air Force
- Years of service: 1966 – 1979
- Rank: Air Vice Marshal
- Battles/wars: Nigerian Civil War

Air Vice Marshal Ishaya Aboi Shekari OON (born 30 August 1940) was the military Governor of Kano State from September 1978 to October 1979, during which he led the transition to the Second Nigerian Republic government of Muhammadu Abubakar Rimi.

== Early life ==
Shekari was born in Taligan (Magamia), Zangon Kataf to parents of Atyap heritage. He started his elementary education at a junior primary school in Zangon Kataf before moving to a middle in Zaria. He attended two senior primary schools before gaining admission to the Provincial Secondary School, Zaria where he completed his studies in 1962.

In 1962, he enlisted at the Nigerian Military Training College. In February 1963, he went on a flight training program in Canada under the administration of the Royal Canadian Air Force. From July, 1964 to June 1966, he trained in Germany. He was commissioned into the Nigerian Air Force as a pilot officer.

== Military career ==
- Officer, Nigerian Airforce Training Wing, (November 1966 - August 1967)
- Operations Officer, Nigerian Airforce Headquarters, Lagos (August 1967 - December 1968)
- Officer Commanding, Nigerian Air Force Wing of the Nigerian Defence Academy
- Senior Air Force Officer (Logistics), Nigerian Air Force Headquarters, Lagos
- Commander, Nigerian Air Force Logistics Group, Ikeja (1975 - 1977)
- Commander, 303 Flight Training Centre, Kano (1977 - 1978)

== Military governor ==
In 1978, Shekari succeeded Sani Bello as the military governor of Kano State. He was charged with ensuring a smooth transition from the military to a civilian administration. He was assisted in the capacity as military administrator by Isa Gambo-Dutse and Abdullahi Aliyu Sumaila, Secretary to the Military Government and Secretary to the Executive Council respectively, while Mohammed Sagagi was the Principal Secretary before presiding over the transfer of power to the civilian administration of Muhammadu Abubakar Rimi at the start of the Nigerian Second Republic.

== Later career ==
He later served as Minister of Special Duties during the administration of General Ibrahim Babangida and as administrator of the Federal Urban Mass Transit Programme. During the transition to the Third Nigerian Republic and took part in the organisation of the June 12 election, and was briefly the government appointed interim Chairman of the Social Democratic Party, he was later succeeded as chairman by Tony Anenih.

After retiring, Shekari entered business. In 1990 he was appointed a director of Diamond Bank. He became Chairman of Lion Bank of Nigeria, and a board member of companies such as Grand Cereals and Oil Mills. He is chairman and chief executive of Magami Holdings Ltd. He is also the chairman of Meristem Securities Limited.
