= José Peñarrieta =

Bolivian footballer (born 1988)

Personal information
- Full name: José Feliciano Peñarrieta Flores
- Date of birth: 18 November 1988 (age 37)
- Place of birth: Yacuíba, Tarija, Bolivia
- Height: 1.85 m (6 ft 1 in)
- Position: Goalkeeper

Team information
- Current team: San Antonio Bulo Bulo
- Number: 31

Youth career
- 2005–2007: Petrolero Yacuiba

Senior career*
Years	Team	Apps	(Gls)
2007–2009	Petrolero Yacuiba	20	(0)
2010–2012	La Paz	14	(0)
2012–2013	San José	12	(0)
2014–2015	Petrolero Yacuiba	35	(0)
2015–2018	The Strongest	19	(0)
2019	Oriente Petrolero	9	(0)
2020–2022	Blooming	37	(0)
2023	Jorge Wilstermann	0	(0)
2024–	San Antonio Bulo Bulo	30	(0)
- * Club domestic league appearances and goals as of 30 December 2025

José Feliciano Peñarrieta Flores (born 18 November 1988) is a Bolivian footballer who plays as a goalkeeper for San Antonio Bulo Bulo.

Peñarrieta has appeared for the Bolivia national football team and was part of the squad for the 2015 Copa América.
