= Nery Bareiro =

Paraguayan footballer (born 1988)

Personal information
- Full name: Nery Rubén Bareiro Zorrilla
- Date of birth: 3 March 1988 (age 38)
- Place of birth: San Lorenzo, Paraguay
- Height: 1.84 m (6 ft 0 in)
- Position: Centre back

Team information
- Current team: San Lorenzo
- Number: 29

Youth career
- Olimpia Asunción
- 2003–2007: Libertad

Senior career*
Years	Team	Apps	(Gls)
2007	Libertad	1	(0)
2007	Sportivo Luqueño	4	(0)
2008–2011	Tacuary	94	(4)
2012	Libertad	14	(1)
2013	Deportivo Cali	17	(2)
2014	OFI	5	(0)
2014–2015	Junior	17	(0)
2016	Coritiba	17	(2)
2017	Guaraní	25	(2)
2018	Chapecoense	17	(1)
2019	San Lorenzo	18	(0)
2020	Deportivo Binacional	6	(0)
2020	Juventude	20	(0)
2021	Confiança	22	(1)
2022–2023	Tacuary	56	(3)
2023–	San Lorenzo	14	(0)

International career
2004–2005	Paraguay U17		
2007	Paraguay U20		
- * Club domestic league appearances and goals as of 7 October 2023

Nery Rubén Bareiro Zorrilla (born 3 March 1988) is a Paraguayan footballer who plays as a centre back for San Lorenzo. In 2006, he won the Milk Cup with Paraguay's under-20 team.

== Career ==
Bareiro began playing at the football school of Olimpia Asunción before joining the youth divisions of Club Libertad in 2003. In 2005, he was part of Libertad's U17 and U20 squads and in 2006 he was part of Libertad's U19 and U20 squads.

== Career statistics ==
(Correct As of 13 August 2018)

Club	Season	League			Cup		Continental		Other		Total	
Club	Season	Division	Apps	Goals	Apps	Goals	Apps	Goals	Apps	Goals	Apps	Goals
Libertad
Libertad	2012	Primera División	14	1	-	-	3	0	-	-	17	1
Libertad	Total		14	1	0	0	3	0	0	0	17	1
Deportivo Cali
Deportivo Cali	2013	Primera A	17	0	-	-	-	-	-	-	17	0
Deportivo Cali	Total		17	0	0	0	0	0	0	0	17	0
OFI
OFI	2013–14	Super League Greece	5	0	-	-	-	-	-	-	5	0
OFI	Total		5	0	0	0	0	0	0	0	5	0
Junior
Junior	2014	Primera A	4	0	-	-	-	-	-	-	4	0
Junior	2015	Primera A	13	0	2	0	2	0	-	-	17	0
Junior	Total		17	0	2	0	2	0	0	0	21	0
Coritiba
Coritiba	2016	Série A	13	1	1	0	3	1	-	-	17	2
Coritiba	Total		13	1	1	0	3	1	0	0	17	2
Guaraní
Guaraní	2017	Primera División	19	2	-	-	6	0	-	-	25	2
Guaraní	Total		19	2	1	0	6	0	0	0	25	2
Chapecoense
Chapecoense	2018	Série A	1	0	0	0	0	0	9	1	10	1
Chapecoense	Total		1	0	0	0	0	0	9	1	10	1
Career total			86	4	4	0	14	1	9	1	112	6

== International career ==
Bareiro represented the Paraguay national under-17 football team at the first South American U16 Championship held in 2004 in Paraguay, where Paraguay were crowned champions. He also captained the under-17 team at the 2005 South American Under-17 Football Championship. Bareiro captained the Paraguay national under-20 football team at the 2006 Milk Cup held in Northern Ireland, where Paraguay were crowned champions, scoring in the 43rd minute in a 2–0 victory over the USA.

He also captained the squad at the 2007 South American Youth Championship.

== Titles ==
Libertad

- Primera División: 2007, 2012
