= Yonatan Irrazábal =

Uruguayan footballer (born 1988)

Personal information
- Full name: Yonatan Irrazábal Condines
- Date of birth: 12 February 1988 (age 38)
- Place of birth: Montevideo, Uruguay
- Height: 1.81 m (5 ft 11 in)
- Position: Goalkeeper

Team information
- Current team: River Plate Montevideo
- Number: 1

Youth career
- 2000–2008: Defensor Sporting

Senior career*
Years	Team	Apps	(Gls)
2008–2016	Defensor Sporting	81	(0)
2016–2018	Cerro	70	(0)
2018–2020	Tampico Madero	7	(0)
2020–2021	Rentistas	40	(0)
2022	Albion	27	(0)
2023	Monagas	1	(0)
2023–	River Plate Montevideo	13	(0)

International career
2005	Uruguay U17	2	(0)
2007	Uruguay U20	2	(0)
- * Club domestic league appearances and goals as of 15 September 2024

Yonatan Irrazábal Condines (born 12 February 1988) is a Uruguayan footballer who plays as a goalkeeper for River Plate Montevideo in the Uruguayan Primera División.

== Career ==
=== Tampico Madero ===
In November 2018, Irrazábal moved to Mexican club Tampico Madero. He made his league debut for the club on 13 January 2019 in a 2–1 away defeat to Atlético San Luis.
