= Sergio Ortega (footballer, born 1990) =

Panamanian footballer

Personal information
- Full name: Sergio Valentín Ortega Leguias
- Date of birth: April 18, 1990 (age 36)
- Place of birth: Panama
- Position: Left back

Team information
- Current team: Tauro
- Number: 22

Senior career*
Years	Team	Apps	(Gls)
2010–11	Árabe Unido	3	(0)
2012–	Plaza Amador	159	(1)

International career^{‡}
2017–	Panama	2	(0)
- * Club domestic league appearances and goals ‡ National team caps and goals as of 19:43, 17 November 2018 (UTC)

Sergio Valentín Ortega Leguias (born 18 April 1990) is a Panamanian footballer who plays primarily as a left back. He plays his club football for Plaza Amador and made his national team debut in 2017.

== International career ==
Ortega received his first call up for the Panama national football team in October 2007 for a friendly against Grenada, initially believing the call up was part of a practical joke by his brother. He made his international debut as a substitute in place of Richard Peralta during a 5–0 victory for Panama.
