= Cirilo Mora =

Paraguayan footballer (born 1988)

Personal information
- Full name: Cirilo Antonio Mora Ortíz
- Date of birth: 15 November 1988 (age 37)
- Place of birth: Ypané, Paraguay
- Height: 1.76 m (5 ft 9 in)
- Position: Defensive midfielder

Team information
- Current team: Tacuary

Youth career
- Tacuary

Senior career*
Years	Team	Apps	(Gls)
2004–	Tacuary	78	(7)
2009–2010	→ Vicenza (loan)	0	(0)
2016–2017	Olimpia Itá		

International career
2004	Paraguay U15		
2005	Paraguay U17		
2006	Paraguay U18		
2007	Paraguay U19		
- * Club domestic league appearances and goals

Cirilo Antonio Mora Ortíz (born 15 November 1988) is a Paraguayan footballer who plays for Tacuary Team as overage player.

Mora started his career at the capital club Tacuary and in July 2009 moved to Vicenza. Both players holds EU nationality and could be joined the Serie B club directly. (signing non-EU play abroad is restricted)

He capped for Paraguay national Under-17 football team at 2005 South American Under-17 Football Championship. He appeared at 2004 South American Under-15 Football Championship.
