= Federico Sardella =

Argentine footballer (born 1988)

Personal information
- Full name: Federico Javier Sardella
- Date of birth: 16 April 1988 (age 38)
- Place of birth: Lomas de Zamora, Argentina
- Height: 1.80 m (5 ft 11 in)
- Position: Midfielder

Senior career*
Years	Team	Apps	(Gls)
2005–2011	Banfield	18	(0)
2011	O'Higgins	7	(0)
2012	Deportes Puerto Montt	30	(2)
2013	Deportivo Español	15	(0)
2013–2014	Atlanta	48	(2)
2015	Gimnasia de Jujuy	32	(0)
2016–2017	Almagro	31	(0)
2019	Abano	–	(–)
2019–2020	Assisi	–	(–)
2020–2021	Ducato Spoleto	–	(–)
2021–2022	Castellaneta	–	(–)
2023	Deportivo Camioneros	–	(–)
- * Club domestic league appearances and goals as of 22 March 2020

Federico Javier Sardella (born 16 April 1988) is an Argentine footballer.

== Teams ==
- (Argentina) Banfield 2005–2011
- (Chile) O'Higgins 2011
- (Chile) Deportes Puerto Montt 2012
- (Argentina) Deportivo Español 2013
- (Argentina) Atlanta 2013–2014
- (Argentina) Gimnasia y Esgrima de Jujuy 2015
- (Argentina) Almagro 2016–2017
- (Italy) Abano 2019
- (Italy) Assisi 2019–2020
- (Italy) Ducato Spoleto 2020–2021
- (Italy) Castellaneta 2021–2022
- (Argentina) Deportivo Camioneros 2023

== Honours ==
=== Player ===
Banfield

- Argentine Primera División (1): 2009 Apertura
