= Audu Bako School of Agriculture =

College in Kano State, Nigeria

Coordinates: 12°25′59″N 8°30′55″E

Audu Bako school of Agriculture
- Dambatta, Kano State; Nigeria

Information
- Established: 2002
- Founder: Kano state government
- Category: School of agriculture
- Director: Prof M. A Wailare

The Audu Bako School of Agriculture in Dambatta, Kano State, Nigeria, awards diplomas in technical and vocational subjects for middle-level manpower. It is named after Audu Bako, a former governor of the state.

The college was established in 2002 and is owned and operated by Kano State. It is accredited to offer courses in agricultural and related technology, and a pre-ND course in Science and Technology. In 2005 the college had over 400 students. As of 2023, the college had over 300 staff, and offered over 500 courses and over 50 programmes. It also has 12 departments.

In November 2006, it was among a number of polytechnics for which the National Board for Technical Education suspended admission of students for either failing to secure accreditation or running foul of the law.

== Administration ==
- The College Provost — Prof M. A Wailare
- Deputy Provost — Rabiu Ado Musa
- Registrar — Barr. Ali Abba Hassan
- Bursar — Anas Dansarai
- Librarian — Dahiru Bala Bichi

== Faculties and programmes ==
The College of Agriculture currently has only one faculty (Faculty of Agriculture) with only four programmes. These programmes include agricultural engineering/technology, agricultural technology, animal health and production technology and forestry technology.

== Departments ==
According to its official website, the school has 12 departments.

- Fisheries Technonlogy
- Pest Management Technology
- Home and Rural Economics
- Computer Science
- Crop Production Technology
- Animal Health & Husbandry
- Animal Health & Production Technology
- Forestry Technology
- Agriculture
- Agric Extensions & Management
- Agricultural & Bio-Environmental Engineering Technology
- Remedial and General Studies
