= Alan Casagrande =

Brazilian footballer (born 1987)

Personal information
- Full name: Alan Casagrande de Moura
- Date of birth: 16 February 1987 (age 39)
- Place of birth: Rio de Janeiro, Brazil
- Height: 1.73 m (5 ft 8 in)
- Position: Midfielder

Youth career
- 2005–2006: Ternana

Senior career*
Years	Team	Apps	(Gls)
2007	AC Bellinzona	5	(0)
2008	Bragantino		
2008–2009	GC Biaschesi	0	(0)
- * Club domestic league appearances and goals

Alan Casagrande de Moura (born 16 February 1987, in Rio de Janeiro) is a Brazilian footballer who plays as a midfielder.

After he turned 19, he was sold to AC Bellinzona in January 2007. On 14 January 2008, he signed a contract with Bragantino until the end of the 2008 Campeonato Paulista season. In the 2008–09 season he left for GC Biaschesi in the Swiss 1. Liga.
