= Juan Manuel Morales =

Uruguayan footballer (born 1988)

Personal information
- Full name: Juan Manuel Morales González
- Date of birth: December 19, 1988 (age 37)
- Place of birth: Montevideo, Uruguay
- Height: 1.79 m (5 ft 10 in)
- Position: Left back

Team information
- Current team: El Tanque Sisley
- Number: 3

Youth career
- –2008: Montevideo Wanderers

Senior career*
| Years | Team | Apps | (Gls) |
| 2008–2009 | Montevideo Wanderers | 6 | (0) |
| 2010 | → Sud América (loan) | 11 | (3) |
| 2010–2011 | → El Tanque Sisley (loan) | 20 | (2) |
| 2011 | Boston River | 11 | (1) |
| 2012 | Saprissa | 20 | (3) |
| 2013– | El Tanque Sisley | 2 | (1) |
- * Club domestic league appearances and goals as of March 28, 2013

Juan Manuel Morales (born 19 December 1988) is an Uruguayan footballer who currently plays as a left back. He is the son of the former Uruguayan football striker Carlos María Morales.
