= List of governors of Kano State =

This is a list of administrators and governors of Kano State. Kano State was formed on 27 May 1967 when the Northern region was split into Benue-Plateau, Kano, Kwara, North-Central, North-Eastern and North-Western states.

Name	Title	Took office	Left office	Party	Notes
Commissioner of Police, Audu Bako	Governor	May 1967	July 1975	Military	
Colonel Sani Bello	Military Governor	July 1975	Sept 1978	Military	
Group Captain Ishaya Shekari	Military Governor	Sept 1978	Oct 1979	Military	
Alhaji Muhammadu Abubakar Rimi	Governor	Oct 1979	May 1983	PRP	
Alhaji Abdu Dawakin Tofa	Governor	May 1983	Oct 1983	PRP	
Alhaji Sabo Bakin Zuwo	Governor	Oct 1983	Dec 1983	PRP	
Air Commodore Hamza Abdullahi	Governor	Jan 1984	Aug 1985	Military Governor	
Colonel. Ahmed Muhammad Daku	Military Governor	Aug 1985	1987	Military	
Group Captain Mohammed Ndatsu Umaru	Military Governor	December 1987	27 July 1988	Military	
Colonel Idris Garba	Military Governor	Aug 1988	Jan 1992	Military	
Architect Kabiru Ibrahim Gaya	Governor	Jan 1992	Nov 1993	NRC	
Colonel Muhammadu Abdullahi Wase	Military Administrator	Dec 1993	June 1996	Military	
Colonel Dominic Oneya	Military Administrator	Aug 1996	Sept 1998	Military	
Colonel Aminu Isa Kontagora	Military Administrator	Sept 1998	May 1999	Military	
Engineer (Dr.) Rabiu Musa Kwankwaso	Governor	May 1999	May 2003	PDP	
Malam Ibrahim Shekarau	Governor	May 2003	May 2011	ANPP	
Engineer (Dr.) Rabiu Musa Kwankwaso	Governor	May 2011	May 2015	PDP	
Abdullahi Umar Ganduje	Governor	May 2015	May 2023	APC	
Abba Kabir Yusuf	Governor	May 2023	Incumbent	NNPP	Reinstated

== See also ==
- States of Nigeria
- List of state governors of Nigeria
