= Diego Fretes =

Paraguayan footballer (born 1988)

Personal information
- Full name: Diego Marcelo Fretes Zarza
- Date of birth: June 6, 1988 (age 38)
- Place of birth: Asunción, Paraguay
- Height: 1.70 m (5 ft 7 in)
- Position: Midfielder

Team information
- Current team: Persepam Madura United

Senior career*
Years	Team	Apps	(Gls)
2006–2011	Guaraní		
2007–2008	→ Palmeiras B (loan)		
2012–2013	Rubio Ñu		
2013	San Lorenzo (PAR)		
2014–	Persepam Madura United		
- * Club domestic league appearances and goals

Diego Marcelo Fretes Zarza (born June 6, 1988) is a Paraguayan footballer who plays as a midfielder for Persepam Madura United in the Indonesia Super League.
