= Dambatta =

Danbatta Dan-batta Dambarta
- LGA and town
- Nickname: Garin Jayau
- Motto: Batta ka dawo
- Interactive map of Danbatta
- Location in Nigeria
- Coordinates: 12°25′59″N 8°30′55″E
- Country: Nigeria
- State: Kano State
- Established: 1979

Government
  - Type: Multi-party democracy
  - Honourable Chairman.: Muhammad Abdullahi Wango

Area
  - Total: 732 km^{2} (283 sq mi)
  - Land: 722 km^{2} (279 sq mi)

Population (2006 census)
  - Total: 207,968
  - Density: 284.1/km^{2} (736/sq mi)
- Time zone: UTC+1 (WAT)
- 3-digit postal code prefix: 702
- Area code: Dbt
- ISO 3166 code: NG.KN.DM

Danbatta (or Dambatta or Dambarta) is a town and Local Government Area in Kano State, Nigeria. It is located about 79 kilometres (49 miles) north of Kano city at the Northern border of Kano state with Jigawa State.

It has an approximate area of 732 km^{2} and a population of 207,968 at the 2006 census. It is bordered to the north and east by Kazaure and Babura Local Government areas of Jigawa State respectively, and to the south and west by Minjibir and Makoda local Government areas of Kano state respectively.

The town is the location for the Audu Bako College of Agriculture (ABCOA) and Kano State School of Basic Midwifery. It is also home to Zone 3 of the Kano state Hospitals Management Board (HMB), Zonal Office of the Kano state Ministry of Education (MOE), Zonal Medical Store of Kano State Ministry of health (MOH), Zonal Office of Kano State Agricultural and Rural Development Agency (KNARDA) and Zonal Office of the Kano State Water Resources Engineering and Construction Agency (WRECA).

The postal code of the area is 702.

== History ==
In 1979, the Danbatta local government area was established.

== Religion ==
There two main religions practice in Dambatta which are Islam and Christianity.

== Economy ==
A major economic activity in the region is agricultural agriculture, with a variety of crops growing there, including groundnuts, sorghum, onions, and millet. Hunting, ceramics, textile manufacturing, and leather work are some of the other significant economic activities in the region. The Local Government Area is home to multiple marketplaces, making trade another significant sector in the area.

== Climate ==
In Dambatta, the dry season is partly cloudy, the wet season is oppressive and mostly cloudy, and the weather is hot all year round. The average annual temperature fluctuates between 57 °F and 102 °F, rarely falling below 53 °F or rising over 106 °F. With an average daily high temperature of 98 °F, the hot season spans 2.5 months, from March 19 to June 4. At an average high temperature of 101 °F and low temperature of 79 °F, May is the hottest month of the year in Dambatta. The average daily high temperature during the 1.7-month mild season, which runs from December 8 to January 30, is below 88 °F. At an average low of 58 °F and high of 85 °F, January is the coldest month of the year in Dambatta. The district experiences an annual temperature of 32.13 °C (89.83 °F), which is 2.67% higher than the average for Nigeria. The average yearly precipitation in Dambatta is 52.04 millimetres (2.05 inches) with 65.82 wet days (18.03% of the total).

=== Cloud ===
Throughout the year, there is a noticeable seasonal change in the average percentage of cloud cover in Dambatta. In Dambatta, the clearer season starts about November 10 and lasts for 3.8 months, finishing about March 3. In Dambatta, January is the clearest month of the year with 66% of the sky remaining clear, mostly clear, or partly cloudy on average. Starting about March 3 and lasting 8.2 months until November 10, the cloudier portion of the year begins. With an average of 67% of the sky being cloudy or mostly cloudy, May is the cloudiest month of the year in Dambatta.

== Danbatta Local Government Area Districts ==
- Ajumawa
- Danbatta West
- Danbatta East
- Fagwalawa
- Gwanda
- Gwarabjawa
- Goron
- Maje
- Kove
- Saidawa
- Sansa
- Kove
