= Patricio Salas (footballer, born 1988) =

Chilean footballer (born 1988)

Personal information
- Full name: Patricio Marcelo Salas Huincahue
- Date of birth: 28 August 1988 (age 38)
- Place of birth: Temuco, Chile
- Height: 1.73 m (5 ft 8 in)
- Position: Forward

Senior career*
Years	Team	Apps	(Gls)
2004–2008	Palestino		
2008	Deportes Temuco		
2009–2012	Magallanes		
2013	Deportes Temuco		
2014–2015	San Antonio Unido		
2015	Deportes Melipilla		

International career
2004	Chile U17	0	(0)
- * Club domestic league appearances and goals

Patricio Marcelo Salas Huincahue (born 28 August 1988) is a Chilean former footballer.

His last club was Deportes Melipilla.

== Personal life ==
Salas Huincahue is of Mapuche descent.

== Titles ==
=== Player ===
Magallanes

- Tercera División de Chile (1): 2010

==== Individual ====
- Tercera División de Chile Top scorer (1): 2010
