= Sergio Ortega (footballer, born 1988) =

Paraguayan footballer

Personal information
- Full name: Sergio Alejandro Ortega Cantero
- Date of birth: 26 September 1988 (age 38)
- Place of birth: Itauguá, Paraguay
- Height: 1.72 m (5 ft 8 in)
- Position: Midfielder

Youth career
- Cerro Porteño
- 12 de Octubre

Senior career*
Years	Team	Apps	(Gls)
2004–2008	12 de Octubre	64	(12)
2008	Provincial Osorno	3	(0)
2008–2009	Santiago Morning	17	(0)
2010	Sportivo San Lorenzo		
2011	Melgar	2	(0)
2012	Alianza Unicachi	6	(0)

International career
2005–2006	Paraguay U17		
- * Club domestic league appearances and goals

Sergio Alejandro Ortega Cantero (born 26 September 1988 in Itauguá) is a Paraguayan former football midfielder.

== Teams ==
- (Paraguay) 12 de Octubre 2004–2008
- (Chile) Provincial Osorno 2008
- (Chile) Santiago Morning 2008–2009
- (Paraguay) Sportivo San Lorenzo 2010
- (Peru) Melgar 2011
- (Peru) Alianza Unicachi 2012
