= Amni =

Nigerian oil and gas company

Amni International Petroleum Development Company Limited
- Company type: Limited liability company
- Industry: Oil and gas
- Founded: 1993; 33 years ago
- Headquarters: Lagos, Nigeria
- Key people: Chief Tunde J. Afolabi, MFR (Chairman/CEO)
- Products: Crude Oil; Petroleum; Natural Gas
- Website: www.amni.com

The Amni International Petroleum Development Company Limited is a Nigerian independent oil and gas exploration and production company founded in 1993. The company engages in exploration and production of oil and gas. The company operates two oil producing offshore blocks in Nigeria.

In March 2014, it extended to Ghana with plans to drill on its deep-water Central Tano block.
