= Carlos Lemus =

Chilean footballer (born 1989)

Personal information
- Full name: Carlos Alberto Lemus Figueroa
- Date of birth: 3 February 1989 (age 37)
- Place of birth: San Felipe, Chile
- Height: 1.84 m (6 ft 0 in)
- Position: Goalkeeper

Youth career
- 1999–2006: Colo Colo

Senior career*
Years	Team	Apps	(Gls)
2007–2007	Temuco	25	(0)
2008–2009	Deportes Ovalle	55	(0)
2010	Unión San Felipe	0	(0)
2010–2011	Everton	0	(0)
2012–2013	Unión San Felipe	0	(0)
2014–2016	Deportes Colchagua	0	(0)
- * Club domestic league appearances and goals

Carlos Alberto Lemus Figueroa (born 1989) is a Chilean footballer. He plays as a goalkeeper and currently plays for Everton de Viña del Mar of Chilean premier division.

== Biography ==
Carlos was born on 3 February 1989 in the city of San Felipe. At the age of ten years, he was scouted by Colo-Colo and he developed in the lower divisions of the school, playing in Colo-Colo and affiliate Third Division.

In 2004, having reached 14 years of age, makes his debut in the promotion tournament.

At 15 years Carlos was nominated for the Chile national U-16 team, as first goalkeeper. This shares the arc Cristopher Toselli. Upon selection, he travels to play in the 2004 South American Paraguay, where his team reached the quarter-finals.

In 2005 the first team debut against Huachipato the Promotion Tournament, where he later played several more games. In early 2006, and already integrated into the first team, Carlos is suffering a shoulder injury during a workout. This leaves him sidelined for a year, which meant losing a lot of ground in his aspirations for becoming the Colo-Colo first-team goalkeeper.

During the second half of 2007, is on loan to Club de Deportes Temuco, under the direction of Eduardo Bonvallet. During this same period is called the preparatory process of the U-20 of Chile, selection would then second in the Toulon Tournament. In late 2007, Carlos returns to Colo-Colo, where the club chooses action released.

Since early 2008 serves as the first goalkeeper and figure Deportes Ovalle team Tercera División de Chile. With this team make it to contest the final of the Copa Chile 2008/summer 2009, which, in turn, would obtain the title of "Best Goalkeeper".

In December 2009, Carlos was acquired by Union Sports Club of San Felipe, where after a good performance, is called by Nelson Acosta, to join the ranks of Everton de Viña del Mar.

== Clubs ==
Club	Country	Year
Deportes Temuco	Chile	2007
Deportes Ovalle	Chile	2008–2009
Unión San Felipe	Chile	2010
Everton	Chile	2010 –

== Major accomplishments ==
- January 2003 – Player CSD Colo-Colo Projection
- December 2003 – Nike Cup Champion Chile.
- January 2004 – Debut Tournament Promotion. Santiago, Chile.
- March 2004 – Nike – Manchester United Premier Cup Manchester, England.
- September 2004 – Chile National U-16 team – Quarter-Final Sudamericano Paraguay
- April 2007 – Debut First Division B – Club de Deportes Temuco
- December 2007 – Pre-selection Chile National U-20 team
- December 2008 – Best Goalkeeper Chilean Tercera División A
- February 2009 – 2nd place Copa Chile 2008/summer 2009 – Deportes Ovalle SADP
- February 2009 – Best Goalkeeper Copa Chile 2008/summer 2009

== Copa Chile 2009 /summer 2008 ==
During the second half of 2008 and early 2009, Carlos, along with Sports Ovalles SADP, played the Verano 2009. Tournament in which he led his team to the final four games taking on, by definition criminal. This highlights the goalkeeper Carlos Lemus as revelation of the tournament, and placed over the eyes of a club.

Primera Fase (Clasificados Fase Preliminar y ANFP)
Phase	Day	Hour	Home team	Result	Visitors
1st round	11 September	19:00	Dep. Ovalle	3 – 1	Coquimbo Unido
2nd Ronda	8 October	19:30	Dep. Ovalle	0-0 (5-4)	D. La Serena
3rd Ronda	29 October	20:00	Dep. Ovalle	1-1 (4-3)	Cobresal
Quarter-final	3 February	22:00	Dep. Ovalle	2-2 (4-1)	Colo-Colo
Semi-final	11 February	20:00	Dep. Ovalle	2-2 (3-0)	Huachipato
Final	11 February	20:00	Dep. Ovalle	1-2	Concepción University

== Reports ==
- https://web.archive.org/web/20100610221955/http://www.anfp.cl/detalle_noticia.php?noticia=6877
- https://ovallefutbol.blogspot.com/2009/04/carlos-lemus-medida-que-pasen-los.html
- https://ovallefutbol.blogspot.com/2009/02/carlos-lemus-la-idea-es-ganar-la-final.html
- http://www.lidersanantonio.cl/prontus4_nots/site/artic/20090213/pags/20090213000828.html
