= Rodrigo Tapia (footballer, born 1988) =

Chilean footballer

Personal information
- Full name: Rodrigo Eduardo Tapia Contreras
- Date of birth: 13 March 1988 (age 38)
- Place of birth: Santiago, Chile
- Height: 1.70 m (5 ft 7 in)
- Position: Forward

Youth career
- Colo-Colo

Senior career*
Years	Team	Apps	(Gls)
2006	Colo-Colo	7	(2)
2007	→ Ñublense (loan)	5	(0)
2008	→ Municipal Iquique (loan)	14	(7)
2008	→ Fernández Vial (loan)	27	(6)
2009–2010	Deportes Ovalle	–	(–)
2011	Trasandino	–	(–)
2012	San Antonio Unido	–	(–)
Total		53	(15)

International career
2004–2005	Chile U17	1	(0)

Managerial career
- Palestino (youth)
- * Club domestic league appearances and goals

Rodrigo Eduardo Tapia Contreras (born 13 March 1988) is a Chilean former footballer who played as a forward.

== Club career ==
Tapia made his debut with Colo-Colo in 2006, appearing in three games and scoring one goal. He represented the Chile national team at the U-17 level in 2005.

In the 2006 Clasura Tournament 2006 quarterfinals, Tapia along with many other youth players got their chance to shine because the first-team regulars were in Mexico waiting for their Copa Sudamericana 2006 match. Tapia took full advantage of the moment and scored in Colo-Colo's surprise victory over Puerto Montt, 1–0.

In his homeland, he also played for Ñublense, Municipal Iquique, Fernández Vial, Deportes Ovalle, Trasandino and San Antonio Unido.

== Personal life ==
After his retirement, he worked at a plastic bags factory at the same time he performed as football coach at Escuela de Fútbol Rey Palestino.

== Honours ==
=== Club ===
Colo-Colo

- Primera División de Chile (2): 2006 Apertura, 2006 Clausura
