= Felipe Hernández (footballer) =

Chilean footballer (born 1988)

Personal information
- Full name: Felipe Antonio Hernández Sanhueza
- Date of birth: 10 May 1988 (age 38)
- Place of birth: Curicó, Chile
- Height: 1.73 m (5 ft 8 in)
- Position: Midfielder

Youth career
- Colo-Colo

Senior career*
Years	Team	Apps	(Gls)
2006–2008	Colo-Colo	1	(0)
2009	Deportes Puerto Montt	41	(2)
2010	Rangers	2	(0)
2011	Magallanes	18	(1)
2012–2016	Curicó Unido	49	(1)
Total		111	(4)
- * Club domestic league appearances and goals

Felipe Antonio Hernández Sanhueza (born 10 May 1988) is a Chilean former footballer.

== Honours ==
Colo-Colo

- Chilean Primera División (4): 2006–A, 2006–C, 2007–A, 2007–C
