= Hassan Lemu =

Northern Nigeria Private Secretary to Premier of Northern Nigeria

Alhaji Hassan Lemu OON, matawalin Bida
- Born: c. 1921; Gbako, Nigeria
- Died: c. 2017; Minna
- Occupation: Private secretary
- Office: Secretary, Chairman
- Children: 25

Alhaji Hassan Lemu (c. 1921 - c. 2017), OON, was the private secretary of late Ahmadu Bello, Sardauna of Sokoto, the Premier of Northern Nigeria.

== Early life and education ==
Born 1920–21, at Lemu of Gbako, He started at Lemu Elementary School 1939–41, then Niger Middle School, Bida 1942–44, now as Government college, Bida, he later went to Kaduna College 1945–48.

== Northern Nigeria clerk ==
Sir Ahmad appointed him as the third class clerk in Northern Nigeria Secretariat 1949, he also was instructor at Clerical Training College, Zaria, now Institute of Administration ABU, Zaria, Then he was assistant district officer, provincial secretary, permanent secretary, and acting secretary of military government in Kano and North Western Nigeria. At early his 30s, he was acting permanent secretary, Ministry of Justice. After that he rose to the permanent secretary 1974.

In the 1967 creation of states. Niger State, was created in 1976, Lemu later became the chairman and chief executive officer of Niger State Water Board, up to1979. The same year, he also rose the state commissioner for works and housing. He played the following roles in subsequent years as member Code of Conduct Bureau, And chairman, Kaduna Polytechnic Governing Council, member, Arewa House Project, member, Niger State Local Government Elections Tribunal 1997, member, Bida Emirate, Zonal Zakkat Committee. He was awarded Niger State Merit Award 1997 by the Niger State government. His career spanned work in Nigeria and United Kingdom, where he worked in the Office of the Commissioner of Nigeria and Office of the Commissioner for Northern Nigeria, first in 1954 and of 1957. And was appointed honorary peace ambassador, of Niger State, in National Peace Forum, in 2003 and till his death

Lemu was the protocol officer and the principal private secretary of the late Sir Ahmadu Bello, Premier of Northern Nigeria, Sardaunan Sokoto.

He died in Minna, at the age of 95, 2017 and survived four wives, 25 children, 70 grandchildren 100 great-grandchildren.
