= Abubakar Rimi =

Nigerian politician (1940–2010)

Muhammadu Abubakar Rimi

Governor of Kano State
- In office October 1979 – May 1983
- Preceded by: Ishaya Aboi Shekari
- Succeeded by: Abdu Dawakin Tofa

Personal details
- Born: 1940 Sumaila, Northern Region, British Nigeria (now Sumaila, Nigeria)
- Died: 4 April 2010 (aged 69–70)
- Resting place: Farm Center
- Party: People's Redemption Party (1979 to 1983); Nigerian Peoples Party (1983 to 1984); Social Democratic Party (1989 to 1993); Peoples Democratic Party (1998-2006 and 2008 to 2010); Action Congress(2006-2008)
- Spouse: Fatima Rimi
- Children: 1

Alhaji Muhammadu Abubakar Rimi (1940 – 4 April 2010) was a Nigerian politician who was the governor of Kano State during the Second Nigerian Republic. He also served as Federal Minister of Communications from 1993 to 1995 during the military regime of General Sani Abacha.

== Background ==
Rimi was born in 1940 in Rimi Village of Sumaila Local Government Area of Kano State, Nigeria. In the early 1960s, he attended an instructor's course at the institute of Administration in Zaria. He obtained a General Certificate of Education from the University of London. In 1972, he completed a diploma in international affairs at the London institute of World Affairs, and later obtained a master's degree in International Relations. He served as an instructor at the Clerical Training Center in Sokoto, and later became an Administrative Secretary at the Nigerian Institute of International Affairs.

== Early political career ==
Rimi was an independent candidate in the Federal Parliamentary elections for Sumaila Constituency in 1964, while Musa Said Abubakar was the NEPU Federal Parliamentary candidate for Sumaila Constituency. They contested against Alhaji Inuwa Wada of the NPC but they all withdrew for Alhaji Inuwa Wada when they were jailed. He was a member of the Constituent Assembly from 1977 to 1978, representing Gwarzo Local Government (comprising Gwarzo and Karaye Districts then).

In December 1978, he was elected the PRP's Deputy National secretary at the party's first national convention in Lagos. He was a PRP candidate in the 1979 General elections. Rimi was elected governor of the old Kano State on the platform of PRP during Second Nigerian Republic, a post he occupied from October 1979 to May 1983.

== Governor of Kano ==
His cabinet was termed the "All Graduate Cabinet". Alhaji Sule Yahaya Hamma was the Secretary to the State Government, Alhaji Abdullahi Aliyu Sumaila was the Secretary to the Executive Council and Principal Secretary to the Governor later serving as Rimi's Campaign Manager in the 1983 elections, Tijjani Indabawa served as Principal Private Secretary and Sully Abu as Press Secretary. He was said to be a liberal influence, promoting adult literacy and encouraging women to emerge from Purdah.

He abolished the unpopular haraji (personal tax) and jangali (cattle tax), relics of the colonial period when the British governed through the emirs in the North. In 1980, he declared an annual worker's day. His suspension of the Emir of Kano led to riots in July 1981, followed by the killing of Rimi's political advisor Dr. Bala Mohammed Bauchi, on 10 July 1981. During the upheavals the offices of Triumph Newspapers, Radio Kano, and several ministries were burned down.

In May 1983, Rimi fell out with his mentor Aminu Kano and moved from the People's Redemption Party (PRP) to the Nigerian People's Party (NPP) in preparation for the 1983 elections. He resigned from office and was replaced as governor by his deputy, Abdu Dawakin Tofa.

== Later career ==
In 1993, Rimi accepted his appointment as Chairman of the Nigerian Agricultural and Cooperative Bank (NACB) under the General Ibrahim Babangida administration. During the transition to the Third Nigerian Republic, Rimi was a member of the center-left Social Democratic Party (SDP) and one of the early supporters of the June 12 movement opposed to the annulment of the election of MKO Abiola. He later left the June 12 movement, and became a Minister of Communications under the General Sani Abacha administration.

He was one of the founding members of the Peoples Democratic Party (PDP). He was the Chairman of the Finance committee of the Party at its inception and also one of its presidential candidates. He was appointed Chairman of the Nigerian Security Printing and Minting Company (NSPMC) in the first tenure of Obasanjo as a Civilian President. He later moved to the Action Congress (AC), but in 2007 Rimi returned to the (PDP). In December 2008, he called on the Chairman of the Independent National Electoral Commission, (INEC), Professor Maurice Iwu, to resign from office, citing irregularities in the previous presidential election. In January 2006, his wife was killed at his home. His son was among those charged for the murder, but was later released due to lack of evidence and a nephew of his, Mustapha, was then arrested.

== Personal life ==
Rimi was married to Fatima, a high court justice in Niger State. Together they had a daughter, Amina, a graduate of a medical school.

== Death ==
On 4 April 2010, Rimi was attacked by armed robbers while returning to Kano from Bauchi State. Although unharmed, he seemed to have suffered a massive stroke and died shortly thereafter. His funeral was held at Farm Center, and was attended by Bauchi State Governor, Isa Yuguda; former Finance Minister, Adamu Ciroma; Mr. Solomon Lar, Prof. Jerry Gana, and Ghali Umar Na'Abba.
