= List of governors of Adamawa State =

Governor of Adamawa State
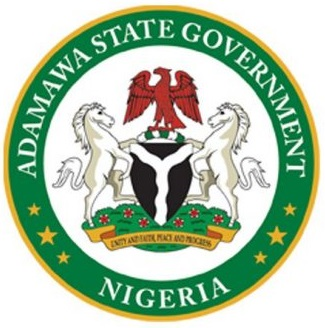
- Seal of Adamawa State of Nigeria

- Flag of Adamawa State of Nigeria
- Incumbent; Ahmadu Umaru Fintiri since 29 May 2019
- Government of Adamawa State
- Style: Governor (informal); His Excellency or Your Excellency (courtesy)
- Member of: Executive Council of Adamawa State
- Reports to: President of Nigeria
- Seat: Yola
- Appointer: Popular vote
- Term length: Four years, renewable once consecutively
- Constituting instrument: Constitution of Nigeria
- Inaugural holder: Abubakar Saleh Michika
- Formation: January 1992
- Deputy: Deputy governor of Adamawa State
- Website: adamawastate.gov.ng

Location of Adamawa State in Nigeria

Adamawa State, located in the North East geopolitical zone of Nigeria, has been governed by a succession of military governors, administrators, acting governors, and elected governors since its creation on 27 August 1991. Before 1991, the area formed the northern portion of the former Gongola State, with Yola serving as the capital. When the military government of Ibrahim Babangida split Gongola into Adamawa and Taraba states, the last military governor of Gongola, Abubakar Salihu, continued briefly as Adamawa's first military governor until the inauguration of civilian rule in January 1992. During the short-lived Third Republic, Abubakar Saleh Michika of the National Republican Convention (NRC) became the first elected civilian governor of Adamawa State, serving from 2 January 1992 until the November 1993 coup. Military rule then returned, and the state was administered successively by Gregory Agboneni (1993–1994), Mustapha Ismail (1994–1996), Joe Kalu-Igboama (1996–1998), and Ahmadu Hussaini (1998–1999).

With the advent of the Fourth Republic in May 1999, all of Adamawa's heads of government have emerged through electoral processes or constitutional succession. Boni Haruna of the Peoples Democratic Party (PDP), originally elected deputy governor on a ticket headed by Atiku Abubakar, became governor when Atiku was chosen as Nigeria's vice-president. Haruna served until 2007, when he was succeeded by Murtala Nyako. Nyako's governorship was interrupted by the annulment of his 2007 election, leading to the brief acting governorship of James Shaibu Barka from February to April 2008, before Nyako returned after winning the by-election. Nyako was later impeached in July 2014, after which Ahmadu Umaru Fintiri briefly served as acting governor until a court restored Nyako's deputy, Bala James Ngilari, as substantive governor in October 2014. Since 2015, the state has been governed by Bindo Jibrilla (2015–2019) and Ahmadu Umaru Fintiri (2019–present).

== List of governors ==
=== Gongola State ===
Gongola State was created on 3 February 1976 during the nationwide state-creation exercise of the military government of Murtala Mohammed. It incorporated the former Adamawa and Sardauna provinces of North-Eastern State and the Wukari Division of Benue-Plateau State, with Yola as its capital. The state existed until 27 August 1991, when it was divided into the present-day Adamawa and Taraba states.

The first military governor of Gongola State was Mohammed Jega, who served from March 1976 to July 1978. He was succeeded by Abdul Rahman Mamudu, who remained in office until the restoration of civilian rule in October 1979. During the Second Republic, Abubakar Barde of the Great Nigeria People's Party (GNPP) became the state's first elected civilian governor. Barde's deputy, Wilberforce Juta, became governor on 6 May 1983 and served until 30 September 1983. Bamanga Tukur of the National Party of Nigeria (NPN) then became governor after winning the 1983 gubernatorial election, but his tenure ended with the December 1983 coup. Military rule resumed in January 1984, with Jega returning as military governor until August 1985. He was followed by Yohanna Madaki (1985–1986), Jonah David Jang (1986–1987), Isa Mohammed (1987–1989), and Abubakar Salihu (1989–1992). Salihu was the final governor of Gongola State and remained in office when the state was replaced by Adamawa and Taraba states in August 1991.

=== Adamawa State ===
Adamawa State was officially created on 27 August 1991 when the military government of Ibrahim Babangida divided the former Gongola State into Adamawa and Taraba states. Yola, which had served as the capital of Gongola State, became the capital of the new Adamawa State. The last military governor of Gongola, Abubakar Salihu, continued briefly as Adamawa's first military governor until the inauguration of the Third Republic in January 1992. During the Third Republic, Abubakar Saleh Michika of the National Republican Convention (NRC) served as the state's first civilian governor from 2 January 1992 until the military coup of November 1993. After the coup, the state was governed by a succession of military administrators: Gregory Agboneni (1993–1994), Mustapha Ismail (1994–1996), Joe Kalu-Igboama (1996–1998), and Ahmadu Hussaini (1998–1999).

With the start of the Fourth Republic in 1999, Boni Haruna of the Peoples Democratic Party (PDP) became governor after the governor-elect, Atiku Abubakar, was selected as vice-president of Nigeria. Haruna served two terms from 1999 to 2007. He was succeeded by Murtala Nyako, whose 2007 election was annulled in 2008, leading to the brief acting governorship of James Shaibu Barka. Nyako returned after winning the by-election and remained in office until his impeachment on 15 July 2014. Ahmadu Umaru Fintiri, then Speaker of the State House of Assembly, served briefly as acting governor until a Federal High Court ruled that Nyako's deputy, Bala James Ngilari, had not validly resigned and should have been sworn in as governor. Since then, Adamawa has been governed by Bindo Jibrilla (2015–2019) and Ahmadu Umaru Fintiri (2019–present).

Heads of the government of Adamawa State
Governor		Term in office (Note: For elected governors, the date of inauguration is listed.)	Party	Election	D. Governor
Abubakar Salihu holding a microphone and wearing a military uniform.	Abubakar Salihu	27 August 1991 – 2 January 1992	Military governor	—	Office did not exist
—	Abubakar Saleh Michika (b. 1941, d. 2018)	2 January 1992 – 17 November 1993	NRC	1991	Lynn Nathan
—	Gregory Agboneni	9 December 1993 – 14 September 1994	Military administrator	—	Office abolished
—	Mustapha Ismail	14 September 1994 – August 1996	Military administrator	—	Office abolished
—	Joe Kalu-Igboama	August 1996 – August 1998	Military administrator	—	Office abolished
—	Ahmadu Hussaini	August 1998 – 29 May 1999	Military administrator	—	Office abolished
—	Boni Haruna (Note: Haruna was elected deputy governor on a ticket headed by Atiku Abubakar and became governor after Atiku was chosen as vice-president.)	29 May 1999 – 29 May 2007	PDP	1999; 2003	Bello Mohammed Tukur
—	Murtala Nyako	29 May 2007 – 26 February 2008	PDP	2007; 2008	Bala James Ngilari
—	James Shaibu Barka	26 February 2008 – 29 April 2008	Acting governor	—	—
—	Murtala Nyako	29 April 2008 – 15 July 2014	PDP	2012	Bala James Ngilari
Ahmadu Umaru Fintiri in white traditional clothing	Ahmadu Umaru Fintiri (b. 1967)	15 July 2014 – 8 October 2014	Acting governor	—	—
—	Bala James Ngilari	8 October 2014 – 29 May 2015	PDP	—	—
—	Bindo Jibrilla	29 May 2015 – 29 May 2019	APC	2015	Martins Babale
Ahmadu Umaru Fintiri in white traditional clothing	Ahmadu Umaru Fintiri (b. 1967)	29 May 2019 – Incumbent	PDP (Note: Fintiri was elected and re-elected on the platform of the PDP, but defected to the APC in February 2026.)	2019; 2023	Kaletapwa Farauta
Ahmadu Umaru Fintiri in white traditional clothing	Ahmadu Umaru Fintiri (b. 1967)	29 May 2019 – Incumbent	APC (from February 2026)	2019; 2023	Kaletapwa Farauta

== See also ==
- List of state governors of Nigeria
