= List of governors of former Nigerian states =

This is a list of governors of former Nigerian states.

== Bendel State ==
This is a list of administrators and governors of Bendel State, Nigeria. Mid-Western region was created in June 1963 from the Benin and Delta provinces. The status of the region was changed to a state on 27 May 1967, and the state was renamed Bendel State on 17 March 1976. Bendel State was divided into Delta State and Edo State on 27 August 1991.

Mid-Western State Leaders	Title	Took office	Left office	Party	Notes
Jereton Mariere	Governor	February 1964	January 1966		Civilian
Lt. Colonel David Ejoor	Governor	January 1966	August 1967	(Military)	
Major Albert Okonkwo	Administrator	August 17, 1967	September 1967	(Military)	Biafra secessionist force
Brig. General Samuel Ogbemudia	Administrator later Governor	21 Sep 1967	Jul 1975	(Military)	
Colonel George Agbazika Innih	Governor	Jul 1975	Mar 1976	(Military)	
Bendel State leaders					
Commodore Husaini Abdullahi	Governor	Mar 1976	Jul 1978	(Military)	
Abubakar Waziri	Governor	Jul 1978	Oct 1979	(Military)	
Professor Ambrose Folorunsho Alli	Governor	Oct 1979	Oct 1983	UPN	
Dr. Samuel Ogbemudia	Governor	Oct 1983	Dec 1983	NPN	
Brigadier Jeremiah Timbut Useni	Governor	Jan 1984	Aug 1985	(Military)	
Colonel John Mark Inienger	Governor	Aug 1985	Dec 1987	(Military)	
Colonel Jonathan Tunde Ogbeha	Governor	Dec 1987	Aug 1990	(Military)	
Colonel John Ewerekumoh Yeri	Governor	Aug 1990	Jan 1992	(Military)	

== Gongola State ==
Name	Took office	Left office	Party
Mohammed Jega	March 1976	July 1978	Military
Abdul Rahman Mamudu	July 1978	October 1979	Military
Abubakar Barde	October 1979	1983	GNPP
Wilberforce Juta	1983	October 1983	GNPP
Bamanga Tukur	October 1983	December 1983	NPN
Mohammed Jega	January 1984	August 1985	Military
Yohanna Madaki	August 1985	August 1986	Military
Jonah David Jang	August 1986	December 1987	Military
Isa Mohammed	December 1987	December 1989	Military
Abubakar Salihu	December 1989	27 August 1991	Military

== Western State ==
This is a list of premiers, administrators and governors of Western State, Nigeria, including the former Western Region. In 1976-02-03, Western State was divided into Ogun, Ondo, and Oyo states.

Western Region Premier	Title	Took office	Left office	Party	Notes
Obafemi Awolowo	Premier	1954	1959		
Samuel Ladoke Akintola	Premier	1960	May 1962		
Senator (Doctor) Moses Majekodunmi	Administrator	29 June 1962	December 1962		Appointed during political emergency
Samuel Ladoke Akintola	Premier	1 January 1963	15 January 1966		
Western Region Governor					
Sir John Dalzell Rankine	Governor	1 October 1954	July 1960		
Sir Adesoji Aderemi	Governor	July 1960	December 1962		
Chief Joseph Odeleye Fadahunsi	Governor	December 1962	15 January 1966		
Lt. Colonel Adekunle Fajuyi	Governor	15 January 1966	29 July 1966	(Military)	
Robert Adeyinka Adebayo	Governor	4 August 1966	27 May 1967	(Military)	Continued as governor of Western State
Western State Governor					Excludes Lagos, split off as a separate state
Robert Adeyinka Adebayo	Governor	28 May 1967	1 April 1971	(Military)	
Brig. Gen. Christopher Oluwole Rotimi	Governor	1 April 1971	July 1975	(Military)	
Akintunde Aduwo	Governor	30 July 1975	30 August 1975	(Military)	
David Jemibewon	Governor	30 August 1975	March 1976	(Military)	

== See also ==
- List of state governors of Nigeria
