= 1992 in Nigeria =

This article discusses the significance of the year 1992 to Nigeria and its people.

== Incumbents ==
=== Federal government ===
- President: Ibrahim Babangida
- Vice President: Augustus Aikhomu
- Chief of Defence Staff: Sani Abacha
- Chief Justice: Mohammed Bello

=== Governors ===
- Adamawa State: Abubakar Saleh Michika (starting 2 January)
- Akwa Ibom State: Akpan Isemin (starting 2 January)
- Anambra State: Chukwuemeka Ezeife (starting 2 January)
- Bendel State: Dahiru Mohammed (starting 2 January)
- Benue State: Moses Adasu (starting 2 January)
- Borno State: Maina Maaji Lawan (starting January)
- Cross River State: Clement Ebri (starting January)
- Delta State: Felix Ibru (starting 2 January)
- Edo State: John Odigie Oyegun (starting 2 January)
- Gongola State: Okwesilieze Nwodo (starting 2 January)
- Imo State: Evan Enwerem (starting 2 January)
- Jigawa State: Ali Sa'ad Birnin-Kudu (starting 2 January)
- Kaduna State: Mohammed Dabo Lere (starting 2 January)
- Kano State: Kabiru Ibrahim Gaya (starting 2 January)
- Katsina State: Saidu Barda (starting 2 January)
- Kebbi State: Abubakar Musa (starting 2 January)
- Kogi State: Abubakar Audu (starting 2 January)
- Kwara State: Shaaba Lafiaji (starting 1 January)
- Lagos State: Michael Otedola (starting 2 January)
- Niger State: Musa Inuwa (starting January)
- Ogun State: Olusegun Osoba (starting January)
- Osun State: Isiaka Adeleke (starting January)
- Oyo State: Kolapo Olawuyi Ishola (starting 2 January)
- Taraba State: Jolly Nyame (starting 3 January)
- Yobe State: Bukar Ibrahim (starting January)

== Events ==
=== July ===
- 4 - parliamentary elections took place, the first since the first since the 1983 military coup
- 25 to August, athletes participated in the Barcelona Olympics

=== September ===
- 26 - 1992 Nigerian Air Force C-130 crash occurs crashes just after take-off from Lagos killing all 158 on board

=== Unknown ===
- Wikki Tourists F.C. football club established

== Births ==
- May 12 - Muideen Akanji, boxer
- June 1 - Lateef Elford-Alliyu, footballer
- September 12 – Bernie Ibini-Isei, footballer
- November 1 - Gbenga Arokoyo, footballer
- November 16 - George Akpabio, footballer
- November 21 - Davido, musician
- December 9 - Michael Augustine, footballer
- December 12 - Ramon Azeez, footballer
- December 22 - Mohamed Bachar, footballer
- December 24 - Michel Babatunde footballer
- December 27 - Femi Balogun, footballer

== Deaths ==
- Major-general Abdul Rahman Mamudu, military Governor of Gongola State (born 1937)
