= 1979 Gongola State gubernatorial election =

1979 gubernatorial election in Gongola State, Nigeria

- 28 July 1979
Nominee	Abubakar Barde	Ahmed Ribadu
Party	Great Nigeria People's Party	NPN
Running mate	Wilberforce Juta
Popular vote	309,775	225,310
Percentage	47.6%	34.6%
Governor before election
Abdul Rahman Mamudu
Nigerian military junta
Elected Governor
Abubakar Barde
GNPP

The 1979 Gongola State gubernatorial election occurred on 28 July 1979. GNPP's Abubakar Barde won election for a first term to become Gongola State's first executive governor leading with 47.6%, defeating main opposition NPN's candidate, Ahmed Mahmudu Ribadu, who polled 34.6% in the contest.

Abubakar Barde emerged GNPP's flag bearer after defeating his closest contestant, Wilberforce Juta, who later became his running mate, at the party primary election by a margin of just three votes.

== Electoral system ==
The Governor of Gongola State is elected using the plurality voting system.

== Results ==
Three of the five political parties registered by the Federal Electoral Commission (FEDECO) participated in the election. Abubakar Barde of the GNPP won the contest by polling the highest votes of 47.6%. The total number of registered electorates was 2,284,500. A total of 650,725 votes were cast.

Candidate	Party	Votes	%
Abubakar Barde	Great Nigeria People's Party (GNPP)	309,775	47.60
Ahmadu Ribadu	National Party of Nigeria (NPN)	225,310	34.62
Unity Party of Nigeria (UPN)	72,952	11.21	
Nigerian People's Party (NPP)	26,715	4.11	
People's Redemption Party (PRP)	15,973	2.45	
Total		650,725	100.00
Registered voters/turnout		2,284,500	–
Source: Africa Spectrum
