= List of governors of Gongola State =

This is a list of administrators and governors of Gongola State. Gongola State was formed on 1976-02-03 when North-Eastern State was divided into Bauchi, Borno, and Gongola states. In 1991-08-27 Gongola State was divided into Adamawa State and Taraba State.

Name	Took office	Left office	Party
Mohammed Jega	March 1976	July 1978	Military
Abdul Rahman Mamudu	July 1978	October 1979	Military
Abubakar Barde	October 1979	1983	GNPP
Wilberforce Juta	1983	October 1983	GNPP
Bamanga Tukur	October 1983	December 1983	NPN
Mohammed Jega	January 1984	August 1985	Military
Yohanna Madaki	August 1985	August 1986	Military
Jonah David Jang	August 1986	December 1987	Military
Isa Mohammed	December 1987	December 1989	Military
Abubakar Salihu	December 1989	27 August 1991	Military

== See also ==
- States of Nigeria
- List of state governors of Nigeria
