= 1999 Adamawa State gubernatorial election =

1999 gubernatorial election in Adamawa State, Nigeria

- January 9, 1999
Nominee	Boni Haruna	Bala Takaya
Party	PDP	All People's Party (Nigeria)
Running mate	Bello Tukur
Popular vote	329,595	283,863
Governor before election
Ahmadu Hussaini
Nigerian military junta
Elected Governor
Boni Haruna
PDP

The 1999 Adamawa State gubernatorial election occurred in Nigeria on January 9, 1999. The PDP nominee Boni Haruna won the election, defeating the APP's Bala Takaya.

Atiku Abubakar was the PDP candidate after the primary election and de facto winner of the 1999 Adamawa gubernatorial election, but got nominated by PDP presidential candidate, Olusegun Obasanjo, as vice president. His running mate, Boni Haruna, thereafter assumed his place as Governor-elect. Haruna thereafter picked Bello Tukur as running mate. Among other PDP primary election contestants was Abubakar Girei who got just two votes.

== Electoral system ==
The Governor of Adamawa State is elected using the plurality voting system.

== Results ==
PDP's Boni Haruna emerged winner in the contest.

The total number of registered voters in the state for the election was 1,260,956. However, 1,261,900 were previously issued voting cards in the state.

Candidate	Party	Votes	%
Boni Haruna	People's Democratic Party (PDP)	329,595	53.10
All People's Party (APP)	283,962	45.75	
All People's Party (AD)	7,103	1.14	
Total		620,660	100.00
Registered voters/turnout		1,260,956	–
Source: Nigeria World, IFES
