= 1983 Gongola State gubernatorial election =

1983 gubernatorial election in Gongola State, Nigeria

- August 13, 1983
Nominee	Bamanga Tukur	Abubakar Barde
Party	NPN	NPP
Governor before election
Wilberforce Juta
GNPP
Elected Governor
Bamanga Tukur
NPN

The 1983 Gongola State gubernatorial election occurred on August 13, 1983. NPN's Bamanga Tukur won election for a first term, defeating former governor, NPP's Abubakar Barde and others, in the contest.

== Electoral system ==
The Governor of Gongola State was elected using the plurality voting system.

== Results ==
The NPN candidate, Bamanga Tukur, defeated the decampee ex-governor, NPP's Abubakar Barde to win the contest.

Candidate	Party
Bamanga Tukur	National Party of Nigeria (NPN)
Abubakar Barde	Nigerian People's Party (NPP)
Total
