= Ahmadu Ribadu =

Nigerian politician and diplomat (1925–2003)

Nigeria's ambassador to Niger and Burkina Faso
- In office 1984–1985
- President: Muhammadu Buhari
- Succeeded by: K Ahmad

State Commissioner for Local Government and Social Development
- In office 1976–1978
- Governor: Mohammed Jega

Minister of State for Economic Planning
- In office 1965 – January 1966
- Prime Minister: Abubakar Tafawa Balewa
- Minister: Shehu Shagari

Member of Parliament for Adamawa East
- In office December 1959 – January 1966
- Preceded by: position established
- Succeeded by: position abolished

Personal details
- Born: 1925 Ribadu, Adamawa Province, Colonial Nigeria
- Died: 2003 (aged 77–78)
- Party: National Party of Nigeria
- Other political affiliations: Northern People's Congress
- Children: Nuhu Ribadu
- Occupation: teacher, politician

Ahmadu Ribadu OON MBE (1925 – May 2003) was a Nigerian politician and diplomat. During the Nigerian First Republic, he represented Adamawa East constituency in the Federal Parliament from 1959 to 1966 and held the position of Minister of State in the Federal Ministry of Economic Development. He is the father of politician Nuhu Ribadu.

Ribadu began his career as a teacher in 1943 at Yola Junior Primary School. He spent the next decade teaching and by 1958, he was appointed Schools Manager for the Adamawa Native Authority. He was elected into the Federal House of Representatives in 1959 under the Northern People's Congress (NPC), representing Adamawa East Federal Constituency. In 1965, following the death of Mahmud Ribadu, his close associate and fellow NPC member, Prime Minister Tafawa Balewa shuffled his cabinet and appointed Ribadu Federal Minister of State for Economic Development. He held the position until January 1966, when the First Republic was brought to an end by a military coup.

During the military administration of Brigadier Mohammed Jega, Ribadu was appointed commissioner for finance and economic planning in the newly established Gongola State (1976–1979). In 1979, he unsuccessfully ran for governor of Gongola State under the National Party of Nigeria (NPN), losing to Abubakar Barde of the Great Nigeria People's Party (GNPP). Following the 1983 coup, he served as Nigeria’s ambassador to Niger and Burkina Faso under General Muhammadu Buhari's military government (1984–1985).

Ribadu held the traditional title of Dan Galadima of Adamawa and was a permanent member of the Adamawa Emirate Council.
