= 2003 Adamawa State gubernatorial election =

2003 gubernatorial election in Adamawa State, Nigeria

- (Nigeria)
- April 19, 2003
Nominee	Boni Haruna	Adamu Modibbo
Party	PDP	ANPP
Running mate	Bello Tukur
Popular vote	375,000
Percentage	68.55%
Governor before election
Boni Haruna
PDP
Elected Governor
Boni Haruna
PDP

The 2003 Adamawa State gubernatorial election occurred on April 19, 2003. Incumbent Governor, PDP's Boni Haruna polled 68.55% to win the election for a second term, defeating ANPP's Adamu Modibbo and three other candidates.

Boni Haruna won the PDP nomination at the primary election. He retained Bello Tukur as his running mate.

== Electoral system ==
The Governor of Adamawa State is elected using the plurality voting system.

== Results ==
A total of five candidates registered with the Independent National Electoral Commission to contest in the election. PDP candidate Boni Haruna won election for a second term, defeating four other candidates.

The total number of registered voters in the state was 1,280,204. However, only 74.73% (i.e. 956,664) of registered voters participated in the exercise.

Candidate	Party	Votes	%
Boni Haruna	People's Democratic Party (PDP)	375,000	100.00
Adamu Modibbo	All Nigeria Peoples Party (ANPP)		
Alliance for Democracy (AD)			
United Nigeria People's Party (UNPP)			
Abdulmarlik Mayo Balwa	African Renaissance Party (ARP)		
Total		375,000	100.00
Registered voters/turnout		1,280,204	–
Source: Gamji, Africa Update, Dawodu
