= 1991 Adamawa State gubernatorial election =

1991 gubernatorial election in Adamawa State, Nigeria

Adamawa gubernatorial election
- December 14, 1991
Nominee	Abubakar Saleh Michika
Party	NRC
Elected Governor
Abubakar Saleh Michika
NRC

The 1991 Adamawa State gubernatorial election occurred on December 14, 1991. NRC candidate Abubakar Saleh Michika won the election.

== Conduct ==
An open ballot method was used to conduct the governor's race. On October 19, 1991, the two parties held primaries to choose their standard bearers.

The election occurred on December 14, 1991. NRC candidate Abubakar Saleh Michika won the election.
