= Ahmadu Ribadu College =

Location
- Yola, Adamawa State; Nigeria
- 9.1952°N 12.4812°E

Information
- Type: Private
- Motto: A Janga A Moda
- Established: 2000
- Founder: Hajiya Zainab Tukur
- Administrator: Nazif Isa Ahmed
- Enrollment: 500+

Ahmadu Ribadu College is a secondary school in Yola, Adamawa State, Nigeria. Named after the late Ambassador Ahmadu Ribadu in the year 2000 and commissioned by Alhaji Shehu Shagari former Nigerian president . It was founded by Mrs Zainab Tukur, an entrepreneur, wife to the former minister of commerce and industry Mahmud Tukur.

== History ==
Ahmadu Ribadu College is a privately owned school established in the year 2000.

It is an offshoot of Col. Isa Ahmed Memorial School. It started with 12 students and eight teachers. Ahmadu Ribadu College moved to its permanent site on 2 October 2003.

The official website of the school is www.arcyola.com
