= Yola, Nigeria =

Capital city of Adamawa State, Nigeria

Yola
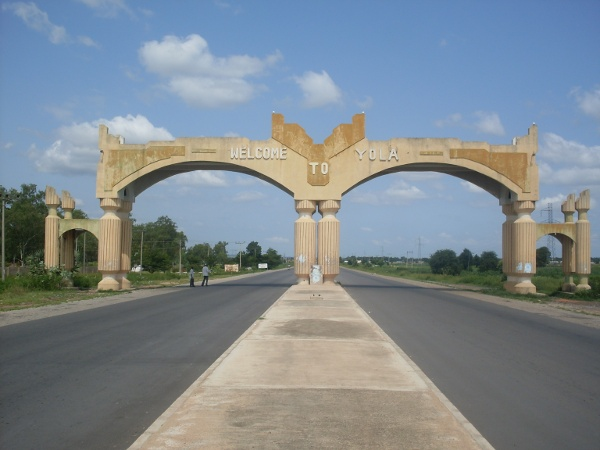

- Location in Nigeria
- Coordinates: 9°13′48″N 12°27′36″E
- Country: Nigeria
- State: Adamawa State
- LGAs: Yola North; Yola South
- Established: 1841
- Founder: Modibbo Adama

Area
  - Total: 118 km^{2} (46 sq mi)
- Elevation: 599 m (1,965 ft)

Population (2006 census)
  - Total: 392,854
  - Density: 3,330/km^{2} (8,620/sq mi)

Ethnicity
  - Ethnic groups: Fulani · Kilba · Kanuri
- Time zone: GMT+1
- Climate: Aw

Yola (from the Fulfulde ƴola: lit. 'Great Plain' or 'Vast Plain Land') is the capital city and administrative centre of Adamawa State, Nigeria. It is located on the Benue River, and has a population of over 392,854 (as of 2006). Yola is split into two parts. The old town of Yola where the Lamido of Adamawa resides, is the traditional city and the new city of Jimeta (about 5 km or 3 mi NW) is the administrative and commercial centre.

To the north are the Mandara Mountains and to the south are the Shebshi Mountains and Mount Dimlang (Vogel Peak).

Yola is an access point to the Gashaka Gumpti Nature Reserve, which is one of the largest national parks in Nigeria, the Ngel Nyaki montane forest reserve, the Mambilla Plateau, the Sukur UNESCO World Heritage Site, which is Africa's first cultural landscape to receive World Heritage List inscription, the Yadin Waterfalls, the Kiri Dam on the Gongola River, the Benue national park in nearby Cameroon, the Waza National Park, and the Cameroonian town of Garoua, which lies across the border, on the Benue river.

== History ==
Established in 1841, Yola is a municipality that sprawls across the hillside of this North-Eastern region of Nigeria. It was the capital of the Adamawa Emirate until it was taken over by the British in 1901. Today, it is the capital of Adamawa State, which was formed in 1991 from part of Gongola State. Modibbo Adama, a local chief of the Fulani, founded Yola in 1841. During the Islamic movement led by Shehu Usman Dan Fodio in the early 19th century, Adama was recognised as a Muslim Scholar who could lead the people in the Upper Benue area. The first European to visit the area was Heinrich Barth in 1851, shortly after Yola was founded. He traveled by the Sahara route, coming through Kukawa near Lake Chad, which at the time was the capital of the Borno Empire.

In 1893, with sponsorship from the German Colonial Society, explorer Herr von Uechtritz visited Yola and described the city:

With the firm, rocky ground we also reached Yola, which is built on a level sandstone ridge. It has between twelve and fifteen thousand inhabitants and gives a friendly impression. From a distance you imagine there is only a forest there, on the edge of which a few houses peep forth; but when you get nearer, a colourful picture unfolds. The fresh, dark green of the trees surrounding the farms contrasts sharply with the vivid red of the earth and the mud huts, and with the blue of the sky; even the monotonous grey of the zana mats and thatch roofs on which creepers climb, does not appear in the least unpleasant. But in truly surprising harmony does the dark brown skin of the inhabitants tone with the gentle and vivid colours of the landscape. And what an unfathomable feeling for beauty and colour awareness is revealed by the choice of white, blue and red materials in their dress!

Yola was located in an area just under 30 kilometres from the capital of Bagale Chiefdom. Prior to this time, Bagale had lost parts of its territory to the Jihadists and it was a surprise that Bagale presented Yola with the greatest danger to its existence through its constant attacks.

The state is serviced by the Yola International Airport which is among the first airports built in Nigeria.

On 17 November 2015, a suicide bombing killed over 30 people.

=== The Economic and Commercial Position of the Yola Metropolis, 1809-1901 ===
The agricultural output in Yola Metropolis come about largely as a result of an intensive use of labor and organization of production by the community at that time. Yola has abundance of cattle which were used as a source for manure for the farmland. The production was both large and small scale. The commercial activities converged around Gurin and its environs which focus on political and military activities as the first capital of Yola. the items trade were military equipment and foodstuff which were essential for the jidah.

== Land ownership ==
Land policy in Yola begin to take shape during the rule of Modibbo Adama that move out Gurin En route to Yola in 1831. Yola was finally established in 1841 with a stable government which secure the land policy proper.

== Climate ==
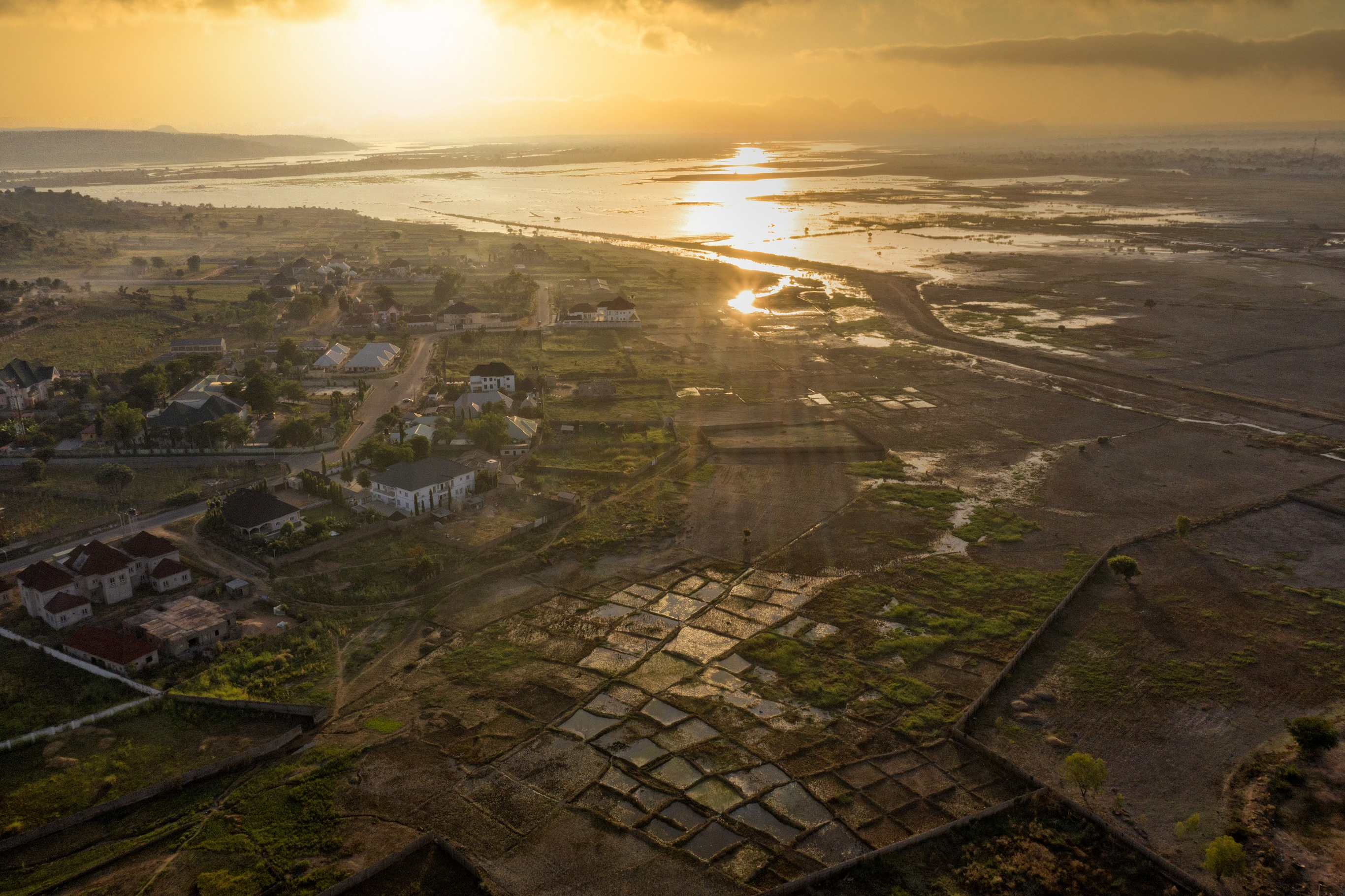
Global warming has had a negative impact on climate and weather patterns as is visible here with the River Gongola flooding some households and farmlands in Yola.

Yola has a tropical savanna climate that borders on a hot semi-arid climate (Aw bordering on BSh according to the Köppen climate classification) with a dry season and wet season. The temperature is warm year-round, with August and September having the lowest average high at 31.3 °C (88.3 °F) and December having the lowest average low at 16.9 °C (62.4 °F). March has the highest average high of 42.8 °C (109.0 °F), while April has the highest average low at 27.0 °C (80.6 °F). The highest temperatures occur in March and April, just before the wet season starts.

Yola receives 872.4 mm (34.35 in) of precipitation annually on average. There is a wet season from May to October and a dry season for the rest of the year. The dry season, especially from February to April, has higher daytime temperatures and can have lower overnight lows. The dry season also has a higher diurnal temperature variation. August is the wettest month, receiving 196.1 mm (7.72 in) of rain on average over 16 precipitation days. No precipitation falls from December to February. Humidity is low in the dry season, dropping to just 13.5% in February, but it can get quite humid during the wet season, especially from July to September. Yola receives 2,845.5 hours of sunshine annually, which is well-distributed throughout the year, with November having the most sunshine and August having the least.

=== Clouds ===
Yola's cloud cover varies significantly throughout the year; clearer months last 4.6 months, while partly overcast months last 7.4 months. The clearest month is January, with 53% of the sky being either mostly clear or clear with 78% of the sky being clouded or overcast, while July and August are the cloudiest months, due to the number of rainy days.

=== Rainfall ===
Yola's monthly rainfall varies greatly according to the season, with a dry season running from November to March and averaging around 100 to 200 mm (3.9 to 7.9 in) per month during the main wet season from May to October. The heaviest rain falls in August, with an average of 196 mm (7.7 in) The duration of the dry spell is 4 months, with January recording the lowest average rainfall of 0.1 mm (0.0039 in).

Climate data for Yola (1991–2020)
Month	Jan	Feb	Mar	Apr	May	Jun	Jul	Aug	Sep	Oct	Nov	Dec	Year
Record high °C (°F)	42.3 (108.1)	44 (111)	45.4 (113.7)	46.5 (115.7)	43 (109)	39 (102)	37.7 (99.9)	35 (95)	38 (100)	39.5 (103.1)	40.6 (105.1)	40.6 (105.1)	46.5 (115.7)
Mean daily maximum °C (°F)	34.5 (94.1)	37.3 (99.1)	40.0 (104.0)	39.7 (103.5)	36.3 (97.3)	33.3 (91.9)	31.6 (88.9)	30.8 (87.4)	31.4 (88.5)	33.5 (92.3)	36.2 (97.2)	35.0 (95.0)	35.0 (95.0)
Daily mean °C (°F)	26.3 (79.3)	29.3 (84.7)	32.6 (90.7)	33.6 (92.5)	31.1 (88.0)	28.8 (83.8)	27.6 (81.7)	27.1 (80.8)	27.3 (81.1)	28.4 (83.1)	28.1 (82.6)	26.3 (79.3)	28.9 (84.0)
Mean daily minimum °C (°F)	18.1 (64.6)	21.4 (70.5)	25.2 (77.4)	27.4 (81.3)	25.9 (78.6)	24.3 (75.7)	23.7 (74.7)	23.3 (73.9)	23.2 (73.8)	23.4 (74.1)	20.1 (68.2)	17.6 (63.7)	22.8 (73.0)
Record low °C (°F)	10 (50)	14 (57)	19 (66)	19 (66)	20 (68)	18.7 (65.7)	17.1 (62.8)	17.8 (64.0)	17.7 (63.9)	18.8 (65.8)	15 (59)	11.5 (52.7)	10 (50)
Average precipitation mm (inches)	0.1 (0.00)	0.2 (0.01)	2.3 (0.09)	35.5 (1.40)	94.5 (3.72)	138.8 (5.46)	159.7 (6.29)	196.2 (7.72)	189.4 (7.46)	67.9 (2.67)	0.8 (0.03)	0.5 (0.02)	886.1 (34.89)
Average precipitation days (≥ 1.0 mm)	0.1	0.1	0.4	3.2	7.2	9.7	10.4	12.4	11.9	5.2	0.1	0.0	60.7
Average relative humidity (%)	25.4	21.5	29.6	50.4	65.9	73.3	80.4	84.0	82.3	75.8	52.7	34.8	56.3
Mean monthly sunshine hours	254.2	229.6	232.5	228.0	244.9	228.0	201.5	195.3	207.0	263.5	282.0	279.0	2,845.5
Mean daily sunshine hours	8.2	8.2	7.5	7.6	7.9	7.6	6.5	6.3	6.9	8.5	9.4	9.0	7.8
Source: NOAA (sunshine 1961–1990)

== Infrastructure ==
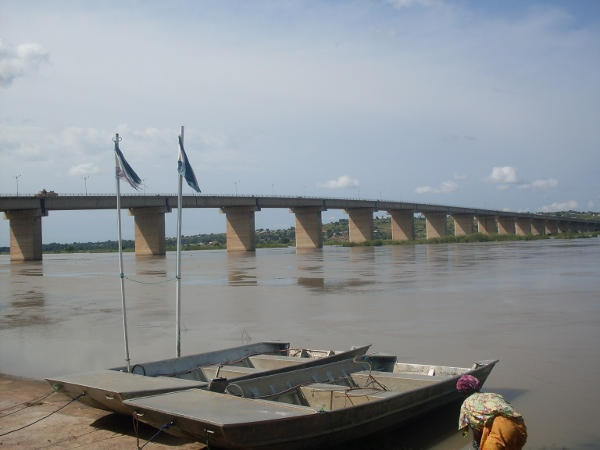
Bridge linking into Yola

The nearby town of Jimeta has a market, zoo, an airport with direct flights to Saudi Arabia, NiPost and NiTel offices as well as the main mosque and cathedral. Being a state capital, it is a major transport hub with buses and taxis heading north to Mubi and Maiduguri, west to Numan, Gombe, jalingo and Bauchi and south to Makurdi and Katsina Ala. Taxis are available to Garoua in Cameroon. There is an airport with regular flights to Abuja and Lagos. The town is home to various institutions of learning, such as the: American University of Nigeria (AUN) (which is Africa's first and only development university), Adamawa State Polytechnic, The Modibbo Adama University Yola (MAU) previously known as Federal University of Technology, Yola, located about 10 km (6 mi) north of the city on the road to Mubi, The Federal Government Girls College, Yola, AUN Academy (ABTI Academy), Aliyu Mustapha Academy, Chiroma Ahmad Academy, Ahmadu Ribadu College, MAUTECH university secondary school, Concordia College (which was nominated as the best post-primary school for 2007 by the National Association of Nigerian Students). Yola also houses one of the six campuses of the Nigerian Law school located beside the American University of Nigeria and many other educational institutions. Adamawa has one of the best depots in Nigeria, located about 5 km (3 mi) west on the road to Numan. Tourist sites include: The Three sister hills in Song Local Government Area, which are three scenic rock formations standing side by side at different height with the middle one as the big sister. The former Njuwa lake fishing festival site which is now dried and developed into residential area. The Lamido's Palace and the Annual horse-riding durbar, originally a Fulbe settlement, the town is largely dominated by Fulbe, as well as people from other parts of the country and the neighboring country of Cameroon.

== Notable people ==
- Ahmadu Umaru Fintiri
- Murtala Hammanyero Nyako
- Atiku Abubakar
- Mohammed Barkindo
- Aisha Buhari
- Boni Haruna
- Boss Mustapha
- Panam Percy Paul
- Nuhu Ribadu
- Alex Badeh
- Aisha Binani
- Buba Marwa
- Abbo Ishaku
- Modi Halilu
- Gubya Mathew

== See also ==
- Ahmadu Ribadu College
- Adamawa State Polytechnic
