= Gregory Agboneni =

Nigerian soldier

Administrator of Adamawa State
- In office 9 December 1993 – 14 September 1994
- Preceded by: Abubakar Saleh Michika
- Succeeded by: Mustapha Ismail

Administrator of Cross River State
- In office 14 September 1994 – 22 August 1996
- Preceded by: Ibrahim Kefas
- Succeeded by: Umar Farouk Ahmed

Personal details
- Born: 30 August 1948 (age 78)

Air Vice Marshal Gregory Agboneni (born 30 August 1948) is a former Nigerian soldier and military administrator of Adamawa and Cross River states.

== Biography ==
Agboneni attended US Air Force Pilot Training as a foreign student in 1971–1972, after which he served as a soldier and fighter pilot for the Nigerian Air Force. Furing the military regime of Head of State General Sani Abacha Agboneni was appointed as Military Administrator of Adamawa State, an office in which he served between December 1993 and September 1994, and of Cross River State, where he served between September 1994 and August 1996. He was also the Commander of the Order of the Niger.

AVM Gregory has a degree in Aeronautics and masters in strategic studies. He is also a winner of the British R.A.F Andover Award.

== See also ==
- List of governors of Cross River State
