= Jennifer Iwenjiora Douglas =

Nigeria–American businesswoman and lawyer, former wife of Atiku Abubakar

Jennifer Iwenjiora Douglas (aka Jamilah Atiku Abubakar) is a Nigerian businesswoman, lawyer, former Nigerian Television Authority (NTA) news correspondent and the former wife of Atiku Abubakar, the former Vice President of Nigeria. She is an Igbo woman and an indigene of Onitsha, Anambra State. She also holds American citizenship.

== Life ==
In the 1980s, she was a correspondent and news reporter for the national television network Nigerian Television Authority. According to reports, she first met Atiku Abubakar in 1982, but they later lost touch. During this time she relocated to the United States in the late 1980s or early 1990s and she married a man named Douglas (for whom she had her son, Anthony Chuka Douglas). Later, they divorced.

She became reacquainted with Atiku Abubakar in the late 1990s and they married as his fourth wife and she changed her name to Jamila Atiku-Abubakar.

In 2010, a U.S. Senate report alleged that she and her husband had transferred over $40 million in suspected funds to the United States through offshore companies.

The couple divorced in June 2021 after over two decades of marriage, with Douglas citing disagreements over her residence in the United Kingdom and the decision of Atiku to marry another wife. According to her, Atiku also threatened to reclaim her property and she was being monitored.

She is also a lawyer, she also holds a doctorate in International Relations and a master's degree in International Politics. She is the editor-in-chief of the Miyetti Quarterly Law Review (MQLR), a legal review journal whose goal is to promote best practice in Northern Nigeria.
