= Abiola =

Abíọ́lá
- Gender: Unisex
- Language: Yoruba

Origin
- Origin: Yorubaland
- Meaning: Born in wealth
- Region of origin: Yorubaland (Nigeria, Benin, Togo)

Abíọ́lá audio is a Yoruba name. The meaning of Abíọ́lá is "born in honour, wealth". It is the shortened form of Abísọ́lá.

== Notable people with the name ==
=== Surname ===
- Doyin Abiola (died 2025), Nigerian journalist and editor
- Hafsat Abiola (born 1974), Nigerian civil-rights activist
- Moshood Abiola (1937–1998), Nigerian businessman, publisher, philanthropist and politician
- Bilikiss Adebiyi-Abiola (born 1983), Nigerian businesswoman

=== Given name ===
- Abiola Abrams (born 1976), American television personality
- Abiola Babatope, Nigerian politician
- Abiola Dauda (born 1988), Nigerian-Swedish footballer
- Abiola Ajimobi (1949–2020), Nigerian politician
- Abiola Irele (1936–2017), Nigerian academic
