= Intels Nigeria =

Logistics company in Nigeria

Intels Nigeria Limited is Nigeria's largest logistics company. It was founded in 1982 as Nicotes Services Ltd and is based in Onne, Nigeria. It is partly owned by Nigeria's former vice President Atiku Abubakar. The company provides integrated logistics services for the Nigerian oil and gas industry. Its services include agency services; cargo services; port management and support services in shore bases. The company also provides equipment, including cranes, forklifts, pipe handlers, generators, trucks, trailers and others specialized services, port facilities, equipment, and personnel services.

Intels is the concessionaire of the Onne Free Trade Zone in Onne Rivers State Nigeria.
