= 2008 Adamawa State gubernatorial by-election =

2008 gubernatorial election in Adamawa State, Nigeria

- April 26, 2008
Nominee	Murtala Nyako	Joel Madaki
Party	PDP	Action Congress of Nigeria
Running mate	Bala James Ngilari
Governor before election
Murtala Nyako
PDP
Elected Governor
Murtala Nyako
PDP

The 2008 Adamawa State gubernatorial by-election occurred on April 26, 2008. Incumbent PDP Governor Murtala Nyako won re-election in the supplementary election, defeating ACN candidate to emerge winner.

Murtala Nyako emerged winner in the PDP gubernatorial primary election. His running mate was Bala James Ngilari.

== Electoral system ==
The Governor of Adamawa State is elected using the plurality voting system.

== Results ==
There were 12 parties registered with the Independent National Electoral Commission to contest in the re-run election. The two main contenders were PDP Governor Murtala Nyako, who won the contest, and ACN's Markus Gundiri, who follows closely.

Candidate	Party
Murtala Nyako	People's Democratic Party (PDP)
Markus Gundiri	Action Congress of Nigeria (ACN)
Joel Madaki	Labour Party (Nigeria) (LP)
Others	
Total
Source: Online Nigeria
