= Joe Kalu-Igboama =

Nigerian politician

Administrator of Adamawa State
- In office 22 Aug 1996 – August 1998
- Preceded by: Mustapha Ismail
- Succeeded by: Ahmadu Hussaini

Joe A. Kalu-Igboama was a Nigerian Navy (Captain) and was the Military Administrator of Adamawa State between August 1996 and August 1998 during the military regime of General Sani Abacha. Joe A. Kalu-Igboama was a Nigerian Navy (Captain) and was the Military Administrator of Adamawa State between August 1996 and August 1998 during the military regime of General Sani Abacha. He died in 2018.
