= Mohammed Jega =

Muhammad Ilyasu-Bashar

Emir of Gwandu
- Reign: 5 June 2005 – present
- Predecessor: Mustapha Jokollo
- Born: Mohammad Dan Ma’aji Jega; April 23, 1942 (age 84); Jega, Sokoto Province, Northern Region, British Nigeria
- Issue: six sons and a daughter

Military Governor of Gongola State
- In office January 1984 – August 1985
- Head of State: Muhammadu Buhari
- Preceded by: Bamanga Tukur (civilian)
- Succeeded by: Yohanna Madaki
- In office March 1976 – July 1978
- Head of State: Olusegun Obasanjo
- Preceded by: position established
- Succeeded by: Abdul Rahman Mamudu

Military service
- Allegiance: Nigeria
- Branch/service: Nigerian Army
- Rank: Major general
- Commands: Commander, 6th Brigade of the 2nd Division, Onitsha. General Officer Commanding (GOC) 2nd Mechanised Division of the Nigerian Army, Ibadan
- Battles/wars: Nigerian Civil War; Chadian–Libyan War

Major General Mohammed Jega was military Governor of Gongola State, Nigeria between March 1976 and July 1978 during the military regime of General Olusegun Obasanjo, and again between January 1984 and August 1985 during the military regime of General Muhammadu Buhari.

== Birth and education ==
Jega was born on April 23rd, 1942 in Jega, Sokoto State. He attended Jega Elementary School and Birnin Kebi Senior Primary School from 1950-1956, and then Sokoto Provincial Secondary School from 1956-1961. After joining the military, Jega attended the Nigerian Military Training College in 1962, where he became friends with Shehu Musa Yar'Adua. He then completed his commission at the Pakistan Military Academy from 1962-1965. Later in his career, Jega attended the United States Army Command and General Staff College in Fort Leavenworth, Kansas from 1973-1974. Finally, he attended the National Institute for Policy and Strategic Studies, Kuru in 1979.

== Military Career ==
As of the start of the Nigerian Civil War in 1967, Jega led a company in 6th Battalion under Major Gibson Jalo. Jega held the posts of Commander of the 6th Brigade of the 2nd Division, Onitsha, and General Officer Commanding 2nd Mechanised Division of the Nigerian Army, Ibadan. In his second term as governor, he closed most of the schools that had been created by the civilian administration of governor Abubakar Barde due to budgetary constraints.

After retirement, Jega took an active part in the chieftainship lobbies in the 1980s. On 5 June 2005, Jega was named Emir of Gwandu in Kebbi State, replacing Alhaji Mustapha Jokolo. Exactly 20 years later the Supreme Court of nigeria upheld and confirmed him as the substantive Emir of Gwandu.
