= Isa Mohammed =

Governor of Gongola State
- In office December 1987 – December 1989
- Preceded by: Jonah David Jang
- Succeeded by: Abubakar Salihu

Personal details
- Born: 15 May 1949
- Died: 5 May 2007

Wing Commander (retired) Isa Mohammed was appointed Military Governor of Gongola State, Nigeria from December 1987 to December 1989 during the military regime of General Ibrahim Babangida.

As governor, acting on instructions from Babangida's second in command, Vice Admiral Augustus Aikhomu, he refused to confer the staff of office to the Chief of the Kilba of the Hong local government area in Gongola. When a court ruled in favor of two contenders for local government chairmanships on the grounds of electoral irregularities, Isa Mohammed refused to recognise the decision and swear them in as chairmen. He filed an injunction against the Nigerian Bar Association when they boycotted the courts in protest, and later filed a lawsuit against Punch for the way it had reported the incident.

After retirement, he took residence in the exclusive neighborhood of Rayfield in Jos, Plateau State. In April 2006 he was among others arraigned for running Turaki Vanguard, a group loyal to Vice-President Atiku Abubakar, which the government claimed was an unlawful group.
