= Mohamed Bachar =

Nigerien footballer

Personal information
- Full name: Mohamed Bachar
- Date of birth: 22 December 1992 (age 33)
- Place of birth: Agadez, Niger
- Position: Defender

Team information
- Current team: AS Douanes
- Number: 3

Youth career
- 2009–2010: Akokana

College career
| Years | Team | Apps | (Gls) |
| 2010–2011 | Akokana | 0 | (0) |

Senior career*
| Years | Team | Apps | (Gls) |
| 2012 | AS Douanes | 7 | (0) |

International career
| 2009 | Niger U17 | 0 | (0) |
| 2012– | Niger | 10 | (0) |
- * Club domestic league appearances and goals

Mohamed Bachar is a Niger international football player. He made his debut versus Gabon in June 2012. He also participated in the CAF Under 17 Championship in 2009.
