= Atiku Abubakar =

Vice President of Nigeria from 1999 to 2007

His Excellency Atiku Abubakar Wazirin Adamawa, GCON
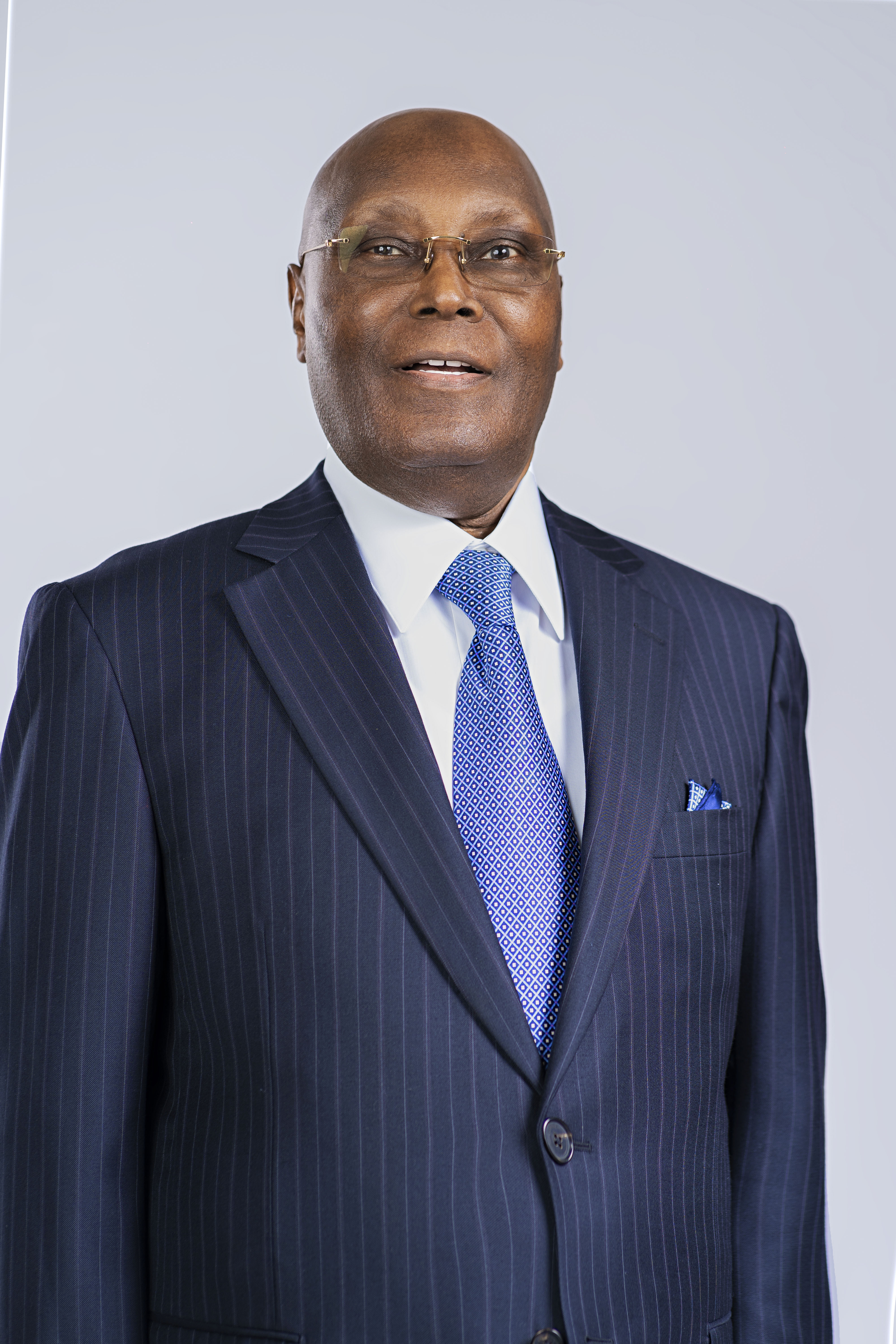
- Abubakar in 2023

11th Vice President of Nigeria
- In office 29 May 1999 – 29 May 2007
- President: Olusegun Obasanjo
- Preceded by: Mike Akhigbe
- Succeeded by: Goodluck Jonathan

Personal details
- Born: 25 November 1946 (age 79) Jada, British Cameroon (now Jada, Adamawa State, Nigeria)
- Party: African Democratic Congress (since 2025)
- Other political affiliations: Peoples Front of Nigeria (1989); Social Democratic Party (1989–1993); United Nigeria Congress Party (1997–1998); Peoples Democratic Party (1998–2006; 2007–2014; 2017–2025); Action Congress (2006–2007); All Progressives Congress (2014–2017)
- Spouses: Titilayo Albert (m. 1971) Ladi Yakubu (m. 1979, divorced) Princess Rukaiyatu Mustafa (m. 1983) Fatima Shettima (m. 1986) Jennifer Iwenjiora Douglas (div. 2021)
- Children: 28
- Education: Master of Arts degree in International Relations
- Alma mater: Ahmadu Bello University; Anglia Ruskin University
- Occupation: Politician; businessman
- Website: Official website

Atiku Abubakar GCON (born 25 November 1946) is a Nigerian politician and businessman who served as the vice president of Nigeria from 1999 to 2007 during the presidency of Olusegun Obasanjo. He ran for the office of governor of Adamawa State in 1990 and 1996 unsuccessfully, but won in 1998. Before he was sworn in, he was selected as running mate to former military leader, Olusegun Obasanjo, during the 1999 presidential election and was re-elected in 2003.

Atiku Abubakar ran unsuccessfully for President of Nigeria six times, in 1993, 2007, 2011, 2015, 2019, and 2023. He ran in the Social Democratic Party presidential primaries in 1993, but lost to Moshood Abiola and Baba Gana Kingibe. He was a presidential candidate of the Action Congress in the 2007 presidential election coming in third to Umaru Yar'Adua of the PDP and Muhammadu Buhari of the ANPP. He contested the presidential primaries of the People's Democratic Party during the 2011 presidential election losing out to incumbent President Goodluck Jonathan. In 2014, he joined the All Progressives Congress ahead of the 2015 presidential election and contested the presidential primaries losing to Muhammadu Buhari. In 2017, he returned to the Peoples Democratic Party and was the party presidential candidate during the 2019 presidential election, again losing to incumbent President Muhammadu Buhari.

In May 2022, he was chosen as the Peoples Democratic Party presidential candidate again, this time for the 2023 general election after he defeated Nyesom Wike, the former Governor of Rivers State, in the primaries. He came in second in the general election, being defeated by Bola Tinubu. Abubakar challenged the result at the Presidential Election Tribunal by demanding for nullification of Tinubu's victory, declare him winner or cancel the election and order for fresh poll. The Supreme Court dismissed Atiku's petition and uphold victory of Bola Tinubu of the APC.

In 2025, Abubakar left the PDP to join the African Democratic Congress, alongside his former rival Peter Obi. The two opposition leaders intend to present a united front against the APC in the 2027 presidential elections. However, Peter Obi left the African Democratic Congress in 2026.

In 2026, Abubakar submitted a nomination form for the presidential role to the African Democratic Congress. He later won the party's primary election and was declared by African Democratic Congress as it's presidential candidate later that year.

== Early life ==
Atiku Abubakar was born on 25 November 1946 in Jada, a village which was part of the British Cameroons – part of the territory later joined with the Federation of Nigeria following the 1961 British Cameroons referendum. His father, Garba Abubakar was a Fulani trader and farmer, and his mother was Aisha Kande. He was named after his paternal grandfather Atiku Abdulqadir who hails from Wurno, Sokoto State and migrated to Kojoli village at Jada, Adamawa State. His maternal grandfather called Inuwa Dutse migrated to Jada, Adamawa State from Dutse, Jigawa State. He became the only child of his parents when his only sister died at infancy. In 1957, his father died by drowning, while crossing a river to Toungo, a neighbouring village to Jada.

=== Childhood and education ===
His father was opposed to the idea of Western education and tried to keep Atiku Abubakar out of the traditional school system. When the government discovered that Abubakar was not attending mandatory schooling, his father spent a few days in jail until Aisha Kande, his mother paid the fine. At the age of eight, Abubakar enrolled in the Jada Primary School, Adamawa. After completing his primary school education in 1960, he was admitted into Adamawa Provincial Secondary School in the same year, alongside 59 other students. He graduated from secondary school in 1965 after he made grade three in the West African Senior School Certificate Examination.

Following secondary school, Abubakar studied for a short while at the Nigeria Police College in Kaduna. He left the college when he was unable to present an O-Level Mathematics result, and worked briefly as a Tax Officer in the Regional Ministry of Finance, from where he gained admission to the School of Hygiene in Kano in 1966. He graduated with a Diploma in 1967, having served as Interim Student Union President at the school. In 1967, he enrolled for a Law Diploma at the Ahmadu Bello University Institute of Administration, on a scholarship from the regional government. After graduation in 1969, during the Nigerian Civil War, he was employed by the Nigeria Customs Service.

In 2021, Abubakar successfully completed and passed his master's degree in International Relations at Anglia Ruskin University.

=== Customs service ===
Abubakar worked in the Nigeria Customs Service for twenty years, rising to become the deputy director, as the second highest position in the Service was then known; he retired in April 1989 and took up full-time business and politics. He started out in the real estate business during his early days as a Customs Officer.

== Business career ==
=== Real estate ===
In 1974, he applied for and received a 31,000 naira loan to build his first house in Yola, which he put up for rent. From proceeds of the rent, he purchased another plot and built a second house. He continued this way, acquiring multiple properties in Yola, Nigeria. In 1981, he moved into agriculture, acquiring 2,500 hectares of land near Yola to start a maize and cotton farm. The business fell on hard times and closed in 1986. "My first foray into agriculture, in the 1980s, ended in failure," he wrote in an April 2014 blog. He then ventured into trading, buying and selling truckloads of rice, flour and sugar.

=== Transportation ===
A significant business development came while Abukar was a Customs Officer at the Apapa Ports. Gabrielle Volpi, an Italian businessman in Nigeria, invited him to set up Nigeria Container Services (NICOTES), a logistics company operating within the Ports. NICOTES would later go on to become Intels Nigeria Limited and provide substantial financial returns to Abubakar. Abubakar is a co-founder of Intels Nigeria Limited, an oil servicing business with extensive operations in Nigeria and abroad. Atiku's other business interests are centred within Yola, Adamawa; and include the Adama Beverages Limited, a beverage manufacturing plant in Yola, an animal feed factory, and the American University of Nigeria (AUN), the first American-style private university to be established in Sub-Saharan Africa. He retired in April 1989 and took up full-time business and politics.

=== Conflict of interests ===
He has faced conflict-of-interest accusations related to account of his involvement in business while a civil servant, who exercised supervisory authority. On his part, Abubakar has defended the decision, saying his involvement was limited to the ownership of shares (which government rules permitted), and that he was not involved in the day-to-day running of the business. His company NICOTES would later be rebranded into INTELS and would later go on to feature prominently in accusations of money laundering levelled against Abubakar by the U.S. government during his vice presidency.

== Early political career ==
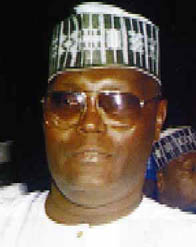
Atiku Abubakar in 1990s

Abubakar's first foray into politics was in the early 1980s, when he worked behind-the-scenes on the governorship campaign of Bamanga Tukur, who at that time was managing director of the Nigeria Ports Authority. He canvassed for votes on behalf of Tukur, and also donated to the campaign.

Towards the end of his Customs career, he met General Shehu Musa Yar'Adua, who had been second-in-command Chief of Staff, Supreme Headquarters between 1976 and 1979. Abubakar was drawn by Yar'Adua into the political meetings that were now happening regularly in Yar'Adua's Lagos home, which gave rise to the People's Front of Nigeria. The People's Front included politicians such as Umaru Musa Yar'Adua, Baba Gana Kingibe, Bola Tinubu, Sabo Bakin Zuwo, Rabiu Kwankwaso, Abdullahi Aliyu Sumaila and Abubakar Koko.

In 1989, Abubakar was elected the National Vice-chairman of the Peoples Front of Nigeria in the build-up to the Third Nigerian Republic. Abubakar won a seat to represent his constituency at the 1989 Constituent Assembly, set up to decide a new constitution for Nigeria. The People's Front was eventually denied registration by the military government (none of the groups that applied was registered), and merged with the government-created Social Democratic Party (SDP).

On 1 September 1990, Abubakar announced his Gongola State gubernatorial bid. A year later, before the elections could hold, Gongola State was broken up into two – Adamawa and Taraba States – by the Federal Government. Abubakar fell into the new Adamawa State. After the contest he won the SDP Primaries in November 1991, but was soon disqualified by the government from contesting the elections.

In 1993, Abubakar contested the SDP presidential primaries. The results after the first ballot of the primaries held in Jos was: Moshood Abiola with 3,617 votes, Baba Gana Kingibe with 3,255 votes and Abubakar with 2,066 votes. Abubakar and Kingibe considered joining forces combining 5,231 votes to challenge Abiola. However, after Shehu Yar'Adua asked Atiku Abubakar to withdraw from the campaign, with Abiola promising to make him his running mate. Abiola was later pressured by SDP governors to select Kinigbe as his Vice-presidential running mate, in the June 12 presidential election.

After the 12 June and during the General Sani Abacha transition, Abubakar showed interest to contest for the Gubernatorial seat of Adamawa State under the United Nigeria Congress Party, the transition program came to an end with the death of General Abacha. In 1998, Abubakar joined the Peoples Democratic Party (PDP) and later secured nomination for Governor of Adamawa State, winning the December 1998 governorship elections, but before he could be sworn in he accepted a position as the running mate to the PDP presidential candidate, former military head of state General Olusegun Obasanjo who went on to win the 1999 presidential election ushering in the Fourth Nigerian Republic.

== Vice President of Nigeria ==
=== First term ===
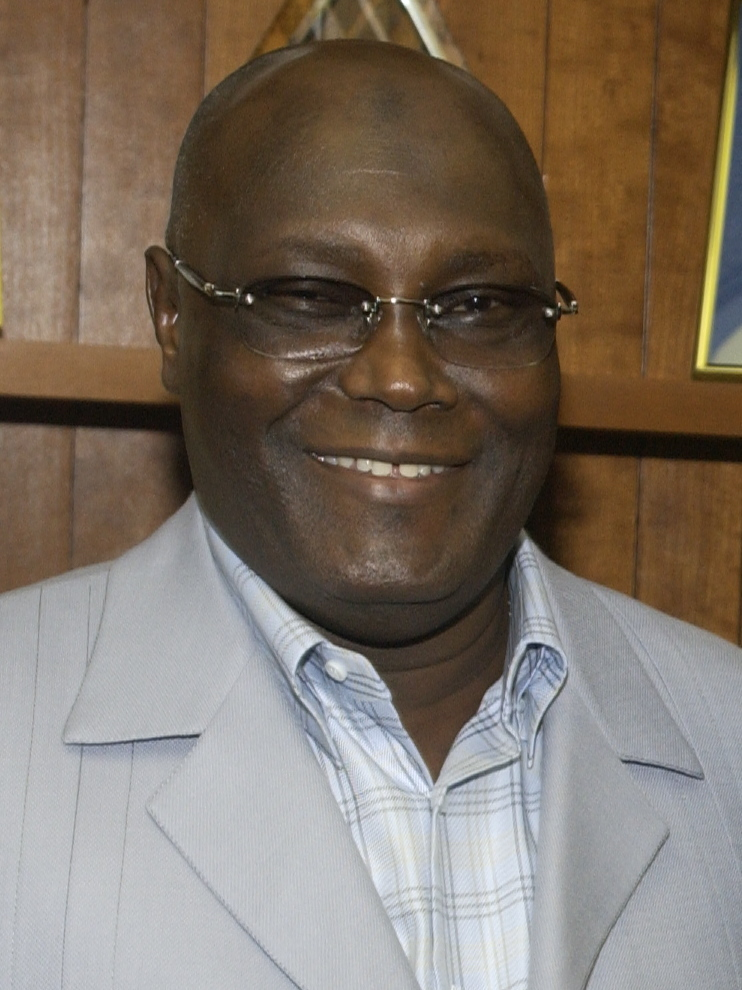
Abubakar in 2003

On 29 May 1999, Abubakar was sworn in as Vice President of Nigeria. His first term was mainly characterized by his role as Chairman of the National Economic Council and head of the National Council on Privatization, overseeing the sale of hundreds of loss-making and poorly managed public enterprises alongside Nasir Ahmad el-Rufai.

=== Second term ===
Abubakar's second term as vice president was marked by a strained relationship with President Obasanjo. In 2006, Abubakar was involved in a public political dispute with his boss, President Olusegun Obasanjo, ostensibly arising from the latter's bid to amend certain provisions of the constitution to take another shot at the presidency (Third Term Agenda).

=== Alleged Bribery Scandal ===
In 2005, Abubakar was allegedly involved in a bribery scandal with U.S. Congressman William J. Jefferson. Jefferson reportedly accepted $100,000 in bribes from Lori Mody, a businesswoman seeking to secure contracts in Nigeria, with the funds allegedly intended to influence Abubakar's support for Mody's business ventures.

The FBI investigation uncovered evidence suggesting that Jefferson planned to deliver the bribe to Abubakar. On July 30, 2005, agents videotaped Jefferson receiving $100,000 in a leather briefcase at the Ritz-Carlton hotel in Arlington, Virginia. A later search of Jefferson's home found $90,000 in cash hidden in his freezer, wrapped in aluminum foil.

Both Abubakar and Jefferson denied any wrongdoing. Abubakar stated that Jefferson never suggested providing personal economic benefits, and Jefferson corroborated this claim. However, the investigation suggested that the funds were intended to influence Abubakar's support for Mody's business interests in Nigeria.

In 2009, Jefferson was convicted on multiple corruption charges, including soliciting bribes from businesses seeking to operate in Africa. He was sentenced to 13 years in prison, one of the longest sentences ever given to a former U.S. congressman for corruption. However, in 2017, his sentence was reduced to time served following appeals and changes in legal standards.

=== Third term agenda ===
The controversy generated by the failed constitutional amendment caused a rift in the People's Democratic Party. The National Assembly eventually vetoed the amendments allowing, Obasanjo to run for another term. In 2006, Abubakar fell out with President Olusegun Obasanjo, and switched parties, from the Peoples Democratic Party (PDP) to the Action Congress of Nigeria (ACN), in preparation for the 2007 elections.

In a November 2013 interview regarding Obasanjo's alleged attempts to justify his third term bid, Abubakar is quoted as saying: "[He] informed me that 'I left power twenty years ago, I left Mubarak in office, I left Mugabe in office, I left Eyadema in office, I left Umar Bongo, and even Paul Biya and I came back and they are still in power; and I just did eight years and you are asking me to go; why?' And I responded to him by telling him that Nigeria is not Libya, not Egypt, not Cameroun, and not Togo; I said you must leave; even if it means both of us lose out, but you cannot stay."

On 30 March 2014, Nigerian media reported that a delegation from the Northern Youth Leaders Forum visited Obasanjo at his home in Abeokuta and pleaded with him to "forgive your former vice-president, Alhaji Atiku Abubakar of whatever political sin or offence he might have committed against you." In response, Obasanjo is quoted as saying that "as a leader and father, I bear no grudge against anybody and if there is, I have forgiven them all."

=== Presidential election of 2007 ===
On 25 November 2006 Abubakar announced that he would run for president. On 20 December 2006, he was chosen as the presidential candidate of the Action Congress (AC). On 14 March 2007, the Independent National Electoral Commission (INEC) released the final list of 24 aspirants for 21 April presidential election. Abubakar's name was missing from the ballot. INEC issued a statement stating that Abubakar's name was missing because he was on a list of persons indicted for corruption by a panel set up by the government. Abubakar headed to the courts on 16 March to have his disqualification overturned. The Supreme Court unanimously ruled on 16 April that INEC had no power to disqualify candidates. The ruling allowed Abubakar to contest the election, although there were concerns that it might not be possible to provide ballots with Abubakar's name by 21 April, the date of the election. On 17 April, a spokesman for INEC said that Abubakar would be on the ballot. According to official results, Abubakar took third place, behind PDP candidate Umaru Yar'Adua and ANPP candidate Muhammadu Buhari, with approximately 7% of the vote (2.6 million votes). Abubakar rejected the election results and called for its cancellation, describing it as Nigeria's "worst election ever." He stated that he would not attend Umaru Yar'Adua's inauguration on 29 May due to his view that the election was not credible, saying that he did not want to "dignify such a hollow ritual with my presence".

== Post–vice presidency ==
=== Return to the PDP ===
Following the 2007 elections, Abubakar returned to the People's Democratic Party. In October 2010 he announced his intention to contest for the Presidency. On 22 November, a Committee of Northern Elders selected him as the Northern Consensus Candidate, over former Military President Ibrahim Babangida, former National Security Adviser Aliyu Gusau and Governor Bukola Saraki of Kwara State. In January 2011, Abubakar contested for the Presidential ticket of his party alongside President Jonathan and Sarah Jubril, and lost the primary, garnering 805 votes to President Jonathan's 2736.

In August 2013, the Independent National Electoral Commission (INEC) registered two new political parties. One of them was the Peoples Democratic Movement. Local media reports suggested that the party was formed by Abubakar as a back-up plan in case he was unable to fulfil his rumoured presidential ambitions on the PDP platform. In a statement Abubakar acknowledged that the PDM was founded by his "political associates", but that he remained a member of the PDP.

=== All Progressives Congress ===
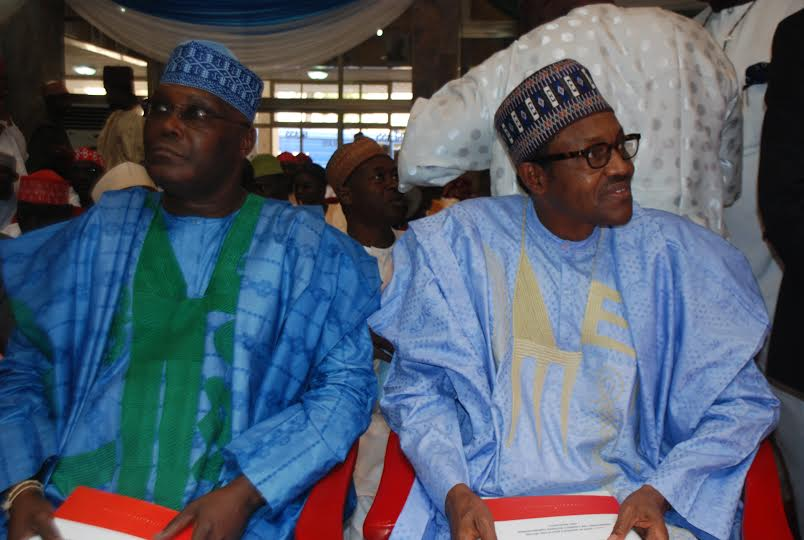
Abubakar with Muhammadu Buhari.

On 2 February 2014, Abubakar once again left the Peoples Democratic Party and became a founding member All Progressives Congress, with the ambition of contesting for the presidency ahead of the 2015 presidential election. The results of the APC presidential primaries results held in Lagos was: Muhammadu Buhari with 3,430 votes, Rabiu Kwankwaso with 974 votes, Atiku Abubakar with 954 votes, Rochas Okorocha with 400 votes and Sam Nda-Isiah with 10 votes. On Friday, 24 November 2017, Abubakar announced his exit from the All Progressives Congress (APC), and returned to the Peoples Democratic Party (PDP) on 3 December 2017. He said he decided to 'return home' to the PDP now that the issues which made him leave the party had been resolved.

=== 2019 presidential campaign ===
In 2018, Abubakar began his presidential campaign and secured the party nomination of the PDP in the presidential primaries held in Port Harcourt on 7 October 2018. He defeated all the other aspirants and got 1,532 votes, 839 more than the runner-up, the Governor of Sokoto State Aminu Tambuwal. Atiku Abubakar continued his campaign rally in Kogi State as he promised to complete abandoned projects in the state. On 30 January, he participated in the town hall meeting tagged #NGTheCandidate. And in the meeting, he declared that he will grant amnesty to looters and he vowed to privatize 90% of NNPC, Nigeria's primary source of income. Atiku took his campaigns to Katsina, visit Emir of Daura on 7 February 2019. On 27 February 2019, Atiku lost the presidential election to incumbent President Muhammadu Buhari by over 3 million votes. He appealed at the Supreme Court and described the election as the "worst in Nigeria's democratic history."

=== 2023 presidential campaign ===
Atiku Abubakar emerged as the presidential candidate of the Peoples Democratic Party for 2023 election after he defeated 12 other candidates in a keenly contested presidential primary held at the Moshood Abiola Stadium in Abuja on 28 May 2022. Of the 767 accredited ballots at the election, he polled 371 votes while his closest challenger, Governor of Rivers State, Nyesom Wike, came second with 237 votes. Former Senate President Bukola Saraki scored 70 votes to come a distant third while Governor of Akwa Ibom State, Udom Gabriel Emmanuel, came fourth with 38 votes.

In 2025, Abubakar left the PDP, accusing it of deviating from its founding principles.

In May 2026, Former Vice President Atiku Abubakar won the presidential ticket of the African Democratic Congress (ADC) after defeating former Minister of Transportation Rotimi Amaechi and businessman Mohammed Hayatu-Deen in the party’s primary election ahead of the general election in 2027.

=== Pre 2027 Presidential election ===
Atiku Abubakar made it to the list of the upcoming 2027 presidential election as the candidate of the African Democratic Congress (ADC) released by The Independent National Electoral Commission signed by Rose Oriaran- Anthony who happens to be the Secretary to the Commission.

== Ideology and public image ==
=== Federalism ===
Abubakar launched the True Federalism campaign in 2017. He has delivered speeches around the country on the need to restructure the country.

He recently declared at an event where he was conferred the award Hero Of Democracy by Hall of Grace Magazine.

"Political decentralization will also help to deepen and strengthen our democracy as it will encourage more accountability. Citizens are more likely to demand accountability when governments spend their tax money rather than rent collected from an impersonal source." He has asserted that "true federalism will encourage states to compete, to attract investments and skilled workers rather than merely waiting for monthly revenue allocation from Abuja".

Many of his speeches have received praise as some Nigerians have supported the idea of True Federalism, which involves allowing states to have control over their resources, most notably the South-South and South East of Nigeria.

=== Education ===
In his speeches and commentary, Abubakar has frequently spoken about the importance of Nigeria’s educational system. He is also the founder of the American University of Nigeria (AUN) in Yola, Adamawa. It was founded in Yola, the capital of Adamawa State as American University of Nigeria (AUN) by Abubakar in 2005. He has said that having benefited from the U.S. system of instruction as a young man, he was eager to make available in Nigeria an American styled faculty – emphasizing critical thinking, small classes, student participation, problem-solving. AUN has received special recognition from Google.

In August 2014, Abubakar said in a statement:

"Our country's educational institutions are clearly not providing quality learning. Our teachers need to be taught. This situation is a new development—of the past 10 years or so. The steady decline of education in Nigeria is a reflection of our country's relegation of education to the background of national essentialities. That is where the change must begin. Teachers are important—as important as senators and doctors. Indeed, teachers determine the quality of senators and doctors. And so, the entire country stands to suffer the effects of this neglect in future. Nigeria must once again make education a priority. We must return to the basics."

In a bid to alleviate the educational decadence in the North East, Abubakar issued scholarships to 15 escapees of the Chibok schoolgirls kidnapping.

=== Corruption ===
Atiku was implicated in an international bribery scandal along with William Jefferson and one of Atiku's wives, Jennifer Atiku Abubakar.

Following rumours by pundits that Atiku was unable to visit the United States, in January 2017, the U.S. government released a statement saying it would need the consent of the politician before it can disclose the true state of his immigration status to the United States. Abubakar has publicly claimed that the true reason is that his visa is still being processed. However, In recent times, Atiku in company with Bukola Saraki, visited the United States on 17 January 2019 with the aid of lobbyist Brian D. Ballard.

Atiku, his daughter Hadiza Abubakar Atiku and his current wife Rukaiyatu Abubakar Atiku, own seven properties in Dubai.

== Personal life ==
Abubakar has four wives and twenty eight children. Atiku explains: "I wanted to expand the Abubakar family. I felt extremely lonely as a child. I had no brother and no sister. I did not want my children to be as lonely as I was. This is why I married more than one wife. My wives are my sisters, my friends, and my advisers and they complement one another."

In 1971, he secretly married Titilayo Albert, in Lagos; her family was initially opposed to the union. His children from her include: Fatima, Adamu, Halima and Aminu. In 1979, he married Ladi Yakubu as his second wife. He has six children with Ladi: Abba, Atiku, Zainab, Ummi-Hauwa, Maryam and Rukaiyatu. In 1983, he married his third wife, Princess Rukaiyatu, daughter of the Lamido of Adamawa, Aliyu Mustafa. Their children are: Aisha, Hadiza, Aliyu (named after her late father), Asmau, Mustapha, Laila and Abdulsalam. Abubakar later divorced Ladi, allowing him to marry, as his fourth wife (the maximum permitted him as a Muslim), Jennifer Iwenjiora Douglas. In 1986, he married his fifth wife (only his fourth legal wife at the time, owing to his earlier divorce from Ladi), Fatima Shettima. Their children include: Amina (Meena), Mohammed and the twins Ahmed and Shehu, the twins Zainab and Aisha, and Hafsat.

On 1 February 2022, Jennifer Douglas confirmed her divorce from Abubakar in a statement to the media. According to her, their union broke down due to disagreements over her continued residence in the United Kingdom, amongst other long-standing issues.

== Awards and honours ==
=== Traditional titles ===
In 1982, Abubakar was given the chieftaincy title of the Turaki of Adamawa by his future father-in-law, Adamawa's traditional ruler Alhaji Aliyu Mustafa. The title had previously been reserved for the monarch's favourite prince in the palace, as the holder is in charge of the monarch's domestic affairs. In June 2017, Abubakar was given the chieftaincy title of the Waziri of Adamawa, and his previous title of Turaki was transferred to his son, Aliyu, his first son with his third wife.

=== International honours ===
In 2011, while celebrating the 50th anniversary of the US Peace Corps in 2011, the National Peace Corps Association (NPCA) – an independent 501 (c) (3) nonprofit organisation, separate from the Peace Corps, that serves as an alumni association for Returned Peace Corps Volunteers – honoured Abubakar with the Harris Wofford Global Citizen Award. At the presentation of the award, the National Peace Corps Association described Abubakar as one individual who contributed to the development of higher education on the continent of Africa. "No private businessman in Africa has worked harder for democracy or contributed more to the progress of higher education than Atiku Abubakar", the NPCA said. This was after 2012 when Abubakar donated $750,000 to the National Peace Corps Association in the United States, "to fund a new initiative featuring global leaders who will discuss Peace Corps's impact." It was the largest ever individual donation in the Association's history.

Party political offices
New political party	PDP nominee for Vice President of Nigeria; 1999, 2003	Succeeded by Goodluck Jonathan
New political party	ACN nominee for President of Nigeria; 2007	Succeeded by Nuhu Ribadu
Preceded by Goodluck Jonathan	PDP nominee for President of Nigeria; 2019, 2023	Most recent
Political offices
Preceded by Mike Akhigbe	Vice President of Nigeria; 1999–2007	Succeeded by Goodluck Jonathan
