= Shebshi Mountains =

- Location within Nigeria

Highest point
- Elevation: 2,042 m (6,699 ft)
- Coordinates: 8°30′N 11°45′E

Geography
- Location: Nigeria

Shebshi Mountains (8.5°N 11.75°E) is a mountain range in Adamawa State, northeastern Nigeria extending in a north-south direction near the Cameroon border and between the Benue and Taraba rivers. The peak altitude is reach with Mount Dimlang (formerly Vogel) at 2,042 m (6,699 ft.). Numerous tributaries of the Benue River, including the Kam, Fan, Sonko, Belwa, and Ini rivers, rise on the range’s wooded upper slopes. This area is sparsely inhabited by subsistence farmers.

== Climate ==
The climate of this region consists mostly of Southern Guinea Savanna and Derived Savanna. Derived Savanna is the result of people clearing forest land for cultivation. Farmers fell a tract of forest, burn the dead trees, and plant crops in the ashes for as long as the soil remains fertile. Then, the field is abandoned and, although forest trees may recolonize, grass takes over on the bare ground (succession), becoming luxuriant enough to burn within a year or so.
