= National Council on Privatisation =

Nigerian think tank

The National Council on Privatization (NCP) is a think tank sponsored by the Nigerian government to determine the political, economic and social objectives of the privatization and commercialization of Nigeria's public enterprises.

Major roads in Nigeria are posted with billboards sponsored by the National Council on Privatisation saying that " the people benefit as the nation privatises".

In Nigeria, there have been some pockets of opposition to the ongoing privatization process. Workers of some of the affected companies are rearing opposition to the privatization. This especially includes the NITEL and NEPA employees.

== Functions ==
- Approve policies on privatization and commercialization.
- Approve guidelines and criteria for valuation of public enterprises for privatization and choice of strategic investors.
- Approve public enterprises to privatized or commercialized.
- Approve the prices of shares or assets of the public enterprises to be offered for sale.
- Approve the appointment of privatization advisors and consultants.
- To approve the budget of the Council.

The Bureau of Public Enterprises is the secretariat of the National Council on Privatisation

== See also ==
- Bureau of Public Enterprises
