= Abiola Abrams =

American author, filmmaker, television personality

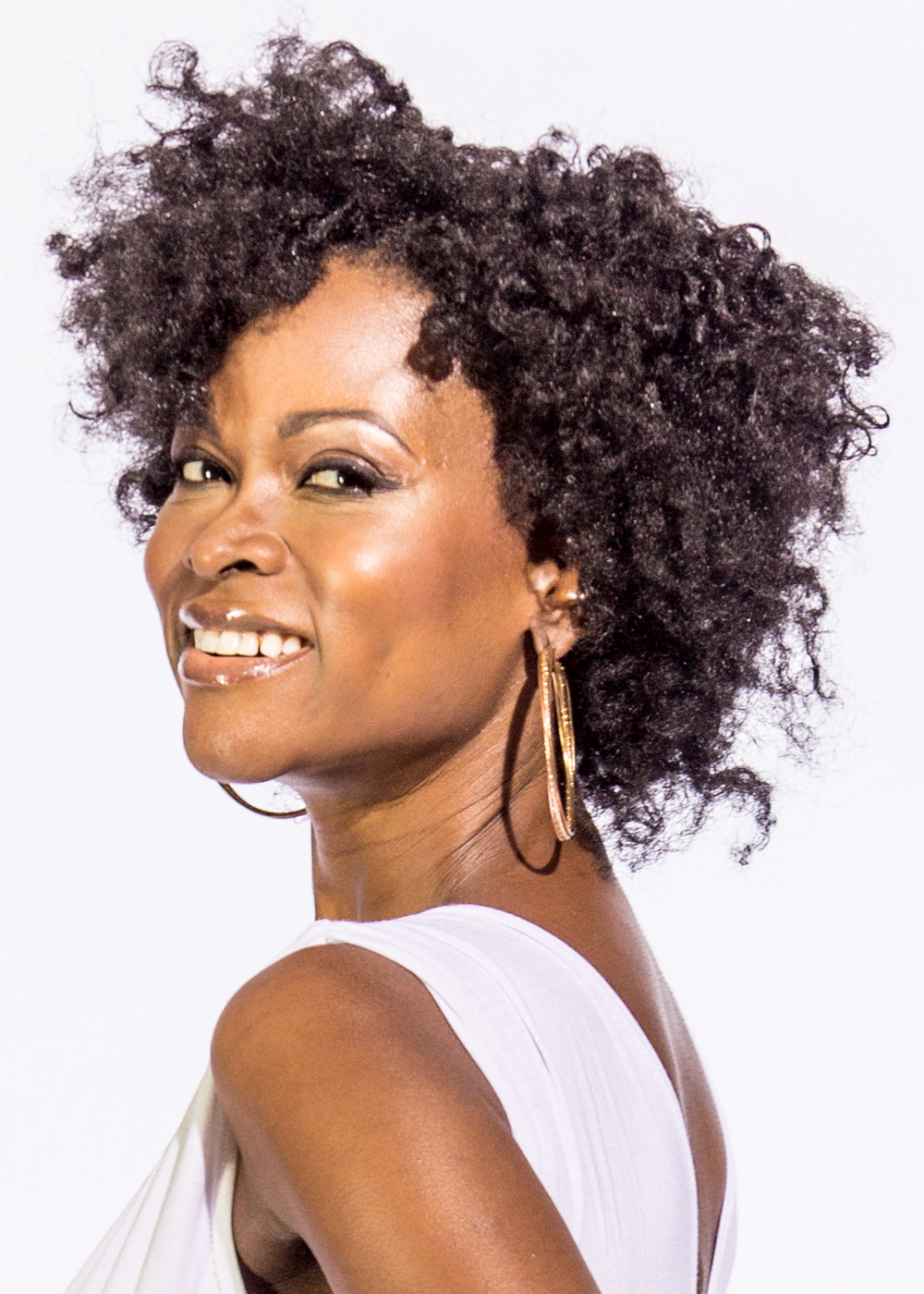
- Abrams in 2013
- Born: Abiola Wednesday Abrams; July 29, 1976 (age 50)
- Education: Brearley School; Sarah Lawrence College (BFA); Vermont College of Fine Arts (MFA)
- Occupations: Author; motivational speaker; media personality
- Known for: books, blogging, podcasts
- Website: Womanifesting.com

Abiola Abrams (born July 29, 1976) is an American author, podcaster, motivational speaker and spiritual life coach. Abrams has penned three books, including African Goddess Initiation: Sacred Rituals for Self-Love, Prosperity, and Joy, her first book from self-help publisher Hay House, published on July 20, 2021. Her second book, The Sacred Bombshell Handbook of Self-Love, won an African American Literary Award for Best Self Help. Black Enterprise included her inspirational podcast in "20 Must-Listen to Black Women Podcasts for 2019" and in 2020, her podcast was chosen by Success.com as one of "16 Motivational Podcasts by Black Hosts You Need to Listen To." Essence Magazine included Abrams' annual Goddess Retreat in their roundup of "Black Girl-Approved and Operated Wellness Escapes." Abrams' website, Womanifesting.com, discusses spirituality, personal growth, and entrepreneurship.

Her previous advice columns include Intimacy Intervention on Essence.com and Abiola's Love Class on MommyNoire.com.

== Early life and education ==
She is a first generation Guyanese-American who was raised in New York City. Abrams attended the Brearley School. She earned a Bachelor of Fine Arts degree from Sarah Lawrence College and a Master of Fine Arts degree from Vermont College of the Union Institute and University.

Abrams was a featured speaker at NYC Women's Empowerment Summit.

== Career ==
Black Enterprise magazine named her site one of the top African American lifestyle blogs. Her first writing project, Goddess City, an empowerment play produced at the Schomburg Center for Research in Black Culture, was published in the anthology Say Word! by the University of Michigan Press.

Dare, Abrams' first novel, was published by Simon & Schuster on December 11, 2007.

Her poem "Groceries" appears in the playwright/activist Eve Ensler's 2007 anthology A Memory, A Monologue a Rant and A Prayer alongside work by such writers as Maya Angelou, Edward Albee, Alice Walker and Edwidge Danticat. Essays by Abrams are featured in the anthologies Behind the Bedroom Door (2008), edited by Paula Derrow, and Dirty Words: A Literary Encyclopedia of Sex (2008), edited by Ellen Sussman.

In the New York Times Style Magazine, filmmaker Miranda July referred to Abrams' evolution from experimental feminist art filmmaker as "just one of many inspiring paths that briefly intersected with the video Chainletter that can't be broken." Abrams' short experimental art film "Ophelia's Opera" included in Miranda July's Joanie 4 Jackie Chainletter film series was acquired in 2017 by the Criterion Channel and the Getty Museum Research Institute.

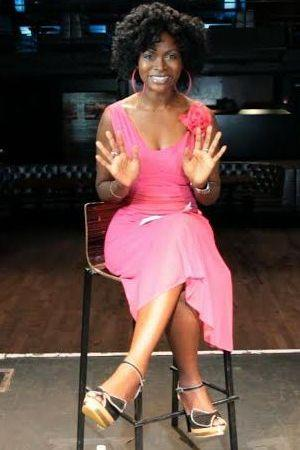
Abrams at the Highline Ballroom in Manhattan hosting a web TV show.

=== Television and film ===
Abrams was a BBC entertainment correspondent from 2011 to 2012 and a former host of The Best Shorts, Black Entertainment Television's (BET) indie film showcase and competition from 2006 to 2008. She has hosted or co-hosted such shows as the syndicated The Source: All Access, Source magazine's hip hop show, and Chat Zone, an HBO interstitial talk show billed as "politically incorrect" for the MTV set, and appeared on Jimmy Kimmel Live! as a part of his red carpet interview coverage of the 2007 BET Awards in Los Angeles.

Abrams directed the documentaries Taboo: The Controversy of Black/White 'Race Mixing' in America (2005), Knives in My Throat: The Year I Survived While My Mind Tried to Kill Me (2005); and short films Stranded (2004), Ophelia's Opera (2001).

== Works ==
- African Goddess Initiation: Sacred Rituals for Self-Love, Prosperity, and Joy (2021)
- African Goddess Rising Oracle Cards (2021)
- Enter the Goddess Temple (2021)
- Sacred Bombshell Handbook of Self-Love (2014)
- Dare: A Love Story (2008)
- Goddess City (2011)
