= Mount Dimlang =

Mountain in Nigeria

Coordinates: 8°23′42″N 11°46′36″E

Highest point
- Elevation: 1,687 m (5,535 ft)
- Prominence: 1,049 m (3,442 ft)
- Listing: Ribu

Geography
- Location: Nigeria

Mount Dimlang (formerly Vogel peak) is located in the Shebshi Mountains in Adamawa State. It is the highest point of the Shebshi Mountains. Its peak reaches a height of about 2,042 m (6,699 ft.), although Google Maps reports the height as being considerably less, around just under 1,700 m.
