= Mustapha Ismail =

Nigerian politician

Administrator of Kwara State
- In office 9 December 1993 – 14 September 1994
- Preceded by: Shaaba Lafiaji
- Succeeded by: Baba Adamu Iyam

Administrator of Adamawa State
- In office 14 September 1994 – 27 August 1996
- Preceded by: Gregory Agboneni
- Succeeded by: Joe Kalu-Igboama

Personal details
- Born: Maru Local Government of Zamfara State

Mustapha Ismail was administrator of Kwara State from December 1993 to September 1994, and was later military administrator of Adamawa State between September 1994 and August 1996 during the military regime of General Sani Abacha.

In January 1995 he opened the 16th General Assembly of Broadcasting Organizations of Nigeria (BON) in Yola, Adamawa State, asking the delegates to help build a nation with hope, pride, unity and peaceful co-existence for present and future generations.

== Tenure ==
Com. Pol. Mustapha Ismail joined the Nigeria Police Force in 1973 and rose to the rank of Commissioner of Police. In December 1993, he was appointed Governor of Kwara State by the military government of General Sani Abacha.

As Governor, Com. Pol.Mustapha Ismail focused on improving the infrastructure of Kwara State. He refurbished the Duku-Lake Dam in Edu LGA, the dam had collapsed in 1989, the dam was capable of irrigating over 3,000 hectares of rice farms, and its refurbishment was a major boost to the agricultural sector in Kwara State, also restored the normal water supply to Ilorin and procured new J-5 buses for the Kwara State Transport Corporation.

Ismail's administration was also notable for its commitment to education. He established the Kwara State University in Malete and the Kwara State Polytechnic in Ilorin, and also introduced a number of reforms to the state's education system.

== Later career ==
Com. Pol. Mustapha Ismail resigned as governor in August 1994. He subsequently served as the military administrator of Adamawa State from August 1996 to August 1998. He is a keen sportsman and enjoys playing tennis and golf and a member of the Nigerian Red Cross Society and the Nigerian Police Force Club.
