= Boni Haruna =

Nigerian politician (born 1957)

Minister of Youth Development
- In office 5 March 2014 – 12 November 2015
- President: Goodluck Jonathan
- Preceded by: Inuwa Abdulkadir
- Succeeded by: Solomon Dalung

Governor of Adamawa State
- In office 29 May 1999 – 29 May 2007
- Deputy: Bello Tukur
- Preceded by: Ahmadu Hussaini
- Succeeded by: Murtala Nyako

Personal details
- Born: 12 June 1957 (age 68) Kubi, Michika, British Cameroon (now in Adamawa State, Nigeria)
- Party: Peoples Democratic Party
- Occupation: Politician

Boni Haruna (born 12 June 1957) is a Nigerian politician who served as Minister for Youth Development of Nigeria from 2014 to 2015. He previously served as governor of Adamawa State from 1999 to 2007 and was a member of the Peoples Democratic Party (PDP).

== Background ==
Haruna was born on 12 June 1957. He studied political science at Ahmadu Bello University, Zaria.

== Governor of Adamawa State ==
Haruna was elected Adamawa State governor in April 1999 and reelected in April 2003. The 2003 result was contested by the All Nigeria Peoples Party (ANPP), which claimed massive electoral fraud. An electoral tribunal declared the election invalid. However, an appeal court overturned the judgement of the tribunal and reinstated Haruna.

In March 2006, Haruna, alongside Bola Tinubu (AD), Orji Kalu (PDP), Chris Ngige (PDP), Ahmed Sani Yerima (ANPP) and Ibrahim Shekarau (ANPP), spoke against a third term for President Olusegun Obasanjo, alleging that most of the pro-third term governors were supporting it because they had something to hide. He reaffirmed his opposition during an April 2006 meeting of 20 state governors.

In September 2006, Haruna, along with Governor Ahmed Yerima of Zamfara State, and other senior politicians, joined United States Ambassador John Campbell to cut the ribbon launching full visa services at the U.S. Embassy in Abuja. The same month, the Chairman of the Economic and Financial Crimes Commission (EFCC), Mallam Nuhu Ribadu, said that Haruna was among 31 state governors under investigation by the commission. In February 2007, the Adamawa State House of Assembly served Haruna with an impeachment notice for alleged gross misconduct and for inability to perform the functions of office as demanded by the 1999 constitution.

== Subsequent career ==
Shortly before the April 2007 national elections, Haruna switched allegiance to the newly formed Action Congress (AC) party. In April 2009, Haruna said that he was withdrawing his support for former Vice-President Atiku Abubakar, due to Atiku's failure to listen to advice from his associates. The split may have been due to Haruna's decision to return to the PDP, while Atiku remained with the Action Congress.

In August 2008, he was arrested by the EFCC headed by Farida Waziri over allegations of corruption while serving as governor of the state between 1999 and 2007. His application for bail was refused. In November 2008, an Abuja Federal High Court granted Haruna leave to travel to the United States for medical treatment, adjourning the case until February 2009 for the accused to take a fresh plea following the EFCC's amended charges.

In May 2009, Haruna was re-arraigned by the Federal Government over alleged money laundering involving N100 million, after the discovery of new evidence related to his period in office as the governor of Adamawa State. In August 2009, the EFCC brought a 28-count charge against Haruna for forgery and illegal movement of about N150m to an unknown destination. In October 2009, the EFCC filed 28 amended charges against Haruna and three others. In November 2009, the EFCC opposed an application by Haruna to again obtain travel documents for medical treatment in the United States.

Haruna competed in the 9 April 2011 election for the Adamawa North Senatorial district on the Action Congress of Nigeria (ACN) platform. Bindo Jibrilla (PDP) defeated him, polling 75,112 votes to Haruna's 70,890 votes. The Congress for Progressive Change (CPC) candidate, Abba Mohammed, polled 22,866 votes.
