= Ahmadu Hussaini =

Ahmadu G. Hussaini

Administrator of Adamawa State
- In office August 1998 – 29 May 1999
- Preceded by: Joe Kalu-Igboama
- Succeeded by: Boni Haruna

Personal details
- Born: 26 October 1958 plateau state

Lt-Colonel Ahmadu G. Hussaini was a Military Administrator of Adamawa State between August 1998 and May 1999 during the transitional regime of General Abdulsalami Abubakar, handing over to the elected civilian governor Boni Haruna at the start of the Nigerian Fourth Republic. He was required to retire, as were all previous military administrators, in June 1999.
