= Abubakar Saleh Michika =

Nigerian politician

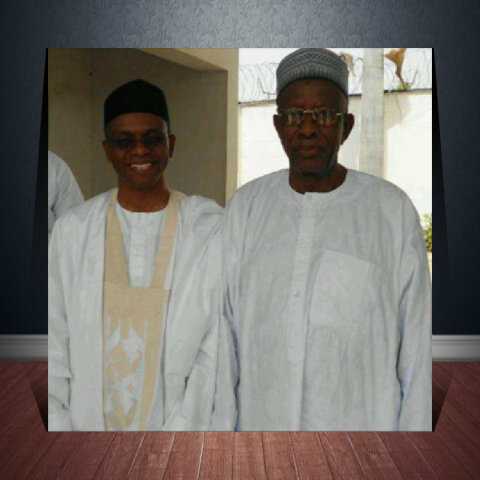
- During a visit by Governor Nasir Ahmad el-Rufai of Kaduna State

Governor of Adamawa State
- In office 2 January 1992 – 17 November 1993
- Deputy: Lynn Nathan
- Preceded by: Abubakar Salihu
- Succeeded by: Mustapha Ismail

Personal details
- Born: 1941 Michika, Adamawa State, Nigeria
- Died: 10 March 2018 (aged 76–77)
- Party: National Republican Convention (NRC); All Nigerian Peoples Party (1998-2003, 2003-2006); Action Congress of Nigeria (2006-2009); Congress for Progressive Change (2009-2013); All Progressive Congress (2013-2018)

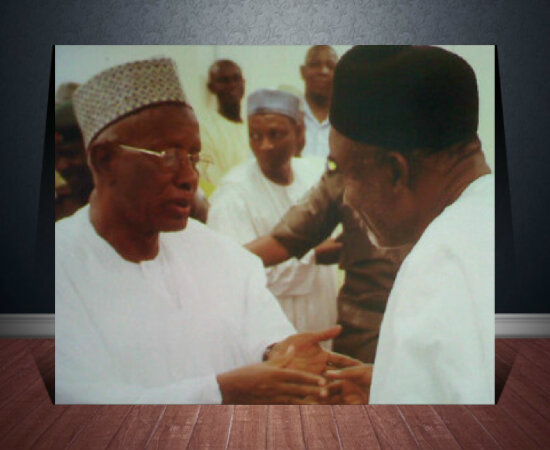
Courtesy Call to Governor Murtala Nyako

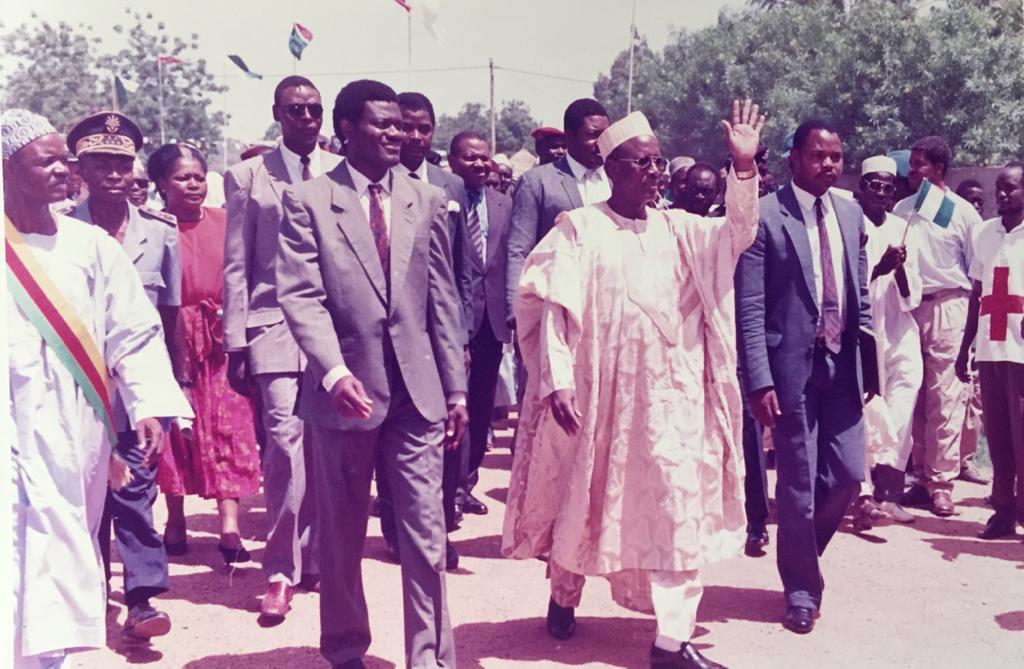
H.E, Governor Saleh Michika on a visit to Cameroon Republic in 1992.

Abubakar Saleh Michika (1941 – 10 March 2018) was a Nigerian civilian governor of Adamawa State, Nigeria from 2 January 1992 to 17 November 1993. He was a member of the then ruling National Republican Convention (NRC). He worked with the British Bank of West Africa in 1966, then John Holt company before joining politics. He was born in Michika, headquarters of the Michika Local Government Area (LGA), in what is now known as Adamawa State Northeast Nigeria. He attended his primary school and Secondary schools in Yola Middle School (now known as the General Murtala Mohammed College Yola) and done his post secondary education at the School for Arabic studies. He is married to four wives with 38 children, 17 boys and 21 girls, 105 grandchildren, and four great-grandchildren, all from his four wives; Hajiya Daudu, Mairama, Aisha and Nana Saleh Michika from Tamanrasset, Algeria. Saleh Michika created a stir when he said in 1992 that he would be willing to relocate to the neighbouring Cameroun if there were a military coup in Nigeria. Fourteen years later, he made a controversial statement that the solution to the problems of corruption and misrule in the country would be a diarchy, a mixture of military and civilian personalities, with a military head of state.

A pragmatist, before the 1993 elections he refused to meet Bashir Tofa, the presidential candidate of his NRC party, but he was helpful when M.K.O. Abiola, candidate of the rival Social Democratic Party (SDP) came to his state. However, in July 1993, after the Ibrahim Babangida administration had annulled Abiola's presidential election, he said "Much as I personally admired Moshood Abiola as an individual, the idea of a southern president was unrealistic".

Some notable projects executed and initiated by the Saleh Michika administration were the Bajabure Housing Estate, establishment of college of Agric, Hong, Doctors quarters, introduction of free WAEC for secondary school students and most notably the State Polytechnic Yola to name a few. Governor Saleh Michika's giant strides during his short stint as governor of Adamawa state made him very popular during the aborted Third republic.

In January 2002, Michika described the National Assembly members as corrupt officials for whom he had no respect, and warned of the danger of another military coup. In October 2002, Saleh Michika was a strong contender to become the All Nigeria People's Party (ANPP) candidate for the Adamawa governorship.

In 2005, President Olusegun Obasanjo appointed him as the chairman governing council of the Federal Polytechnic, Mubi

In May 2006, a police corporal was killed by suspected armed bandits at his residence. However, the state commissioner of police, Alhaji Muhammad Sambo, said the attack was not an assassination attempt. The bandits just wanted to snatch the corporal's gun.

Saleh Michika retired from active politics. He died after a brief illness on the 10 March 2018.
