= Yohanna Madaki =

Nigerian military governor

Colonel Yohanna Madaki

Military Governor of Gongola State
- In office August 1985 – August 1986
- Preceded by: Mohammed Jega
- Succeeded by: Jonah David Jang

Military Governor of Benue State
- In office August 1986 – September 1986
- Preceded by: Jonah David Jang
- Succeeded by: Ishaya Bakut

Personal details
- Born: 31 December 1941 Ziturung, Zangon Kataf LGA, Kaduna State, Nigeria
- Died: 20 May 2006 (aged 64)

Barrister (Colonel) Yohanna Anteyan Madaki (1941–2006) was Governor of Gongola State and then of Benue State, Nigeria during the military regime of General Ibrahim Babangida.

== Background ==
Yohanna Madaki was born in 1941 in Ziturung Karyi, Zangon Kataf Local Government Area in Kaduna State. He attended the then St Paul's Primary School in Zonkwa Kaduna State and thereafter proceeded to the Nigerian Military School (NMS) Zaria. Upon completing the NMS program, he enlisted as a private in the Nigerian Army and served in various Battalions before proceeding to the Mons Cadet Officer Academy at Aldershot England. He was commissioned as a 2nd Lieutenant in the Army on completion of this course. He served actively during the Nigerian Civil War and later in various capacities, including Colonel AQ at the 2nd mechanised division, Ibadan and member of the Special Military Tribunal (Ibadan Zone) 1984-85.

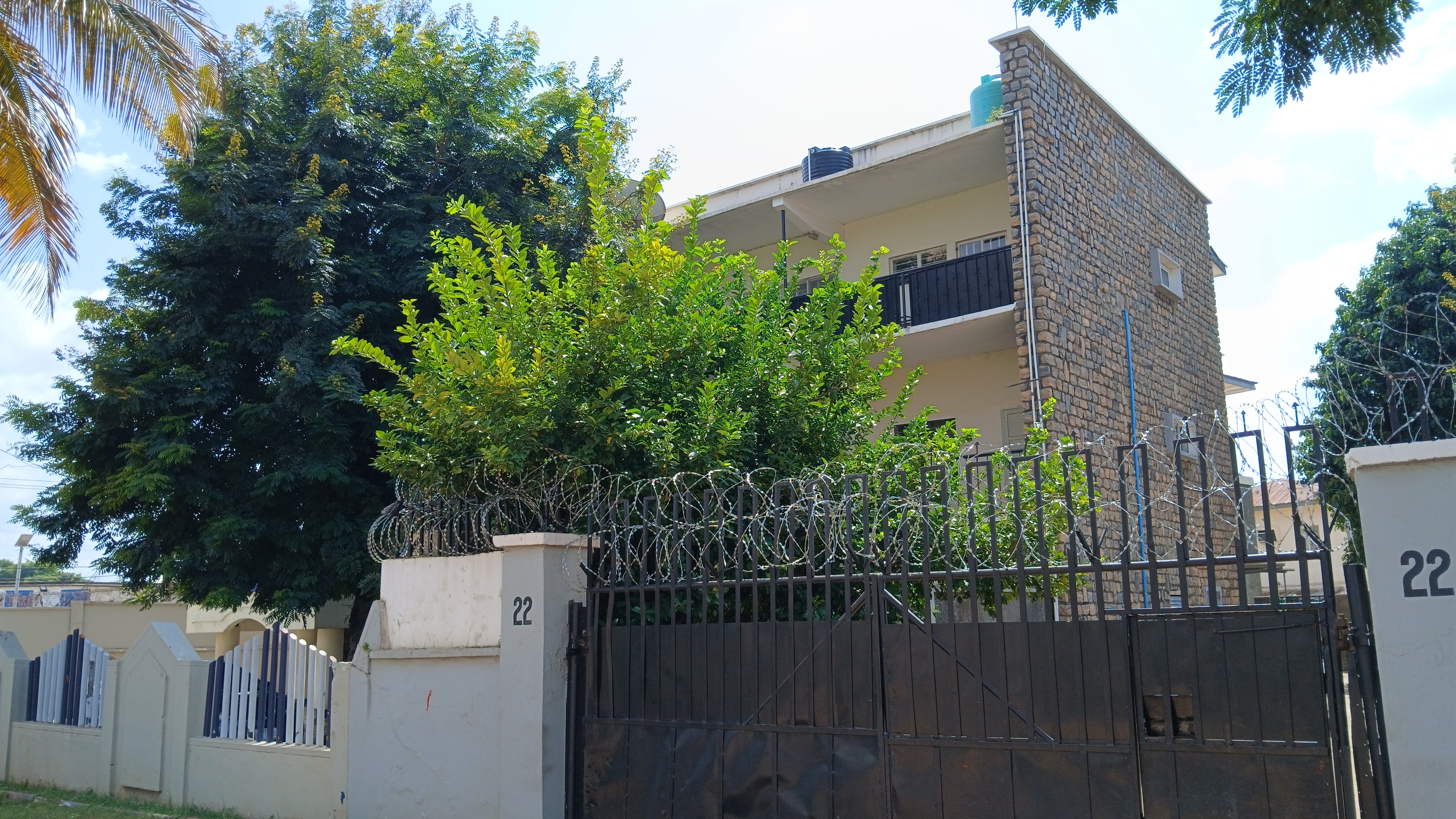
Madaki's Chambers in Kaduna

Whilst in Ibadan he enrolled for the LLB program at the University of Ibadan and earned his law degree in 1984 then proceeded to the law school and was called to the bar in 1985. He was married to Sarah Yanshi and had 5 children, Dorothy, Julie, Astirah, Gagarin, Cindy.

== Military Governor ==
Yohanna Madaki was appointed Military Governor of the defunct Gongola State (now Adamawa and Taraba) in 1985, and was posted from Gongola State to Benue State as the Military Governor from August to September 1986. In his brief administration of Benue State he was unable to achieve much.

While governor of Gongola State in 1985, in a controversial action he sacked the Emir of Muri in the present day Taraba State, saying:

"I have dealt a lethal blow to feudalism."

His grounds were the confiscation of land by the Emir from the local people. The land was returned to the original owners. After Benue state he was posted to the Nigerian Army Legal Service and retired shortly thereafter.

== Later career ==
Yohanna Madaki retired in 1986 and went into full legal practice in Kaduna. He was engaged in many legal battles, often providing service free of charge to needy people, particularly those in the military. He engaged in a prolonged legal battle to save former military governor of Rivers State, Major General Zamani Lekwot from execution. He also served as a member of the 2nd Constituent Assembly in 1988 as well as member of the Presidential Committee on Reforms at the University of Ibadan in the year 2000. In later years he became the first National Legal Adviser of the People's Democratic Party (PDP). In this role, in May 2003 he described a trip to various countries of the campaign organisation of All Nigeria People's Party (ANPP) presidential candidate, General Muhammadu Buhari, as an act of treason. In 2001 he was appointed to the Board of the Securities and Exchange Commission (SEC) as Chairman for a term.

Colonel Yohanna Anteyan Madaki (rtd) died on 20 May 2006 in a London hospital after a brief illness.
