= Abubakar Salihu =

Nigerian politician (1949–2020)

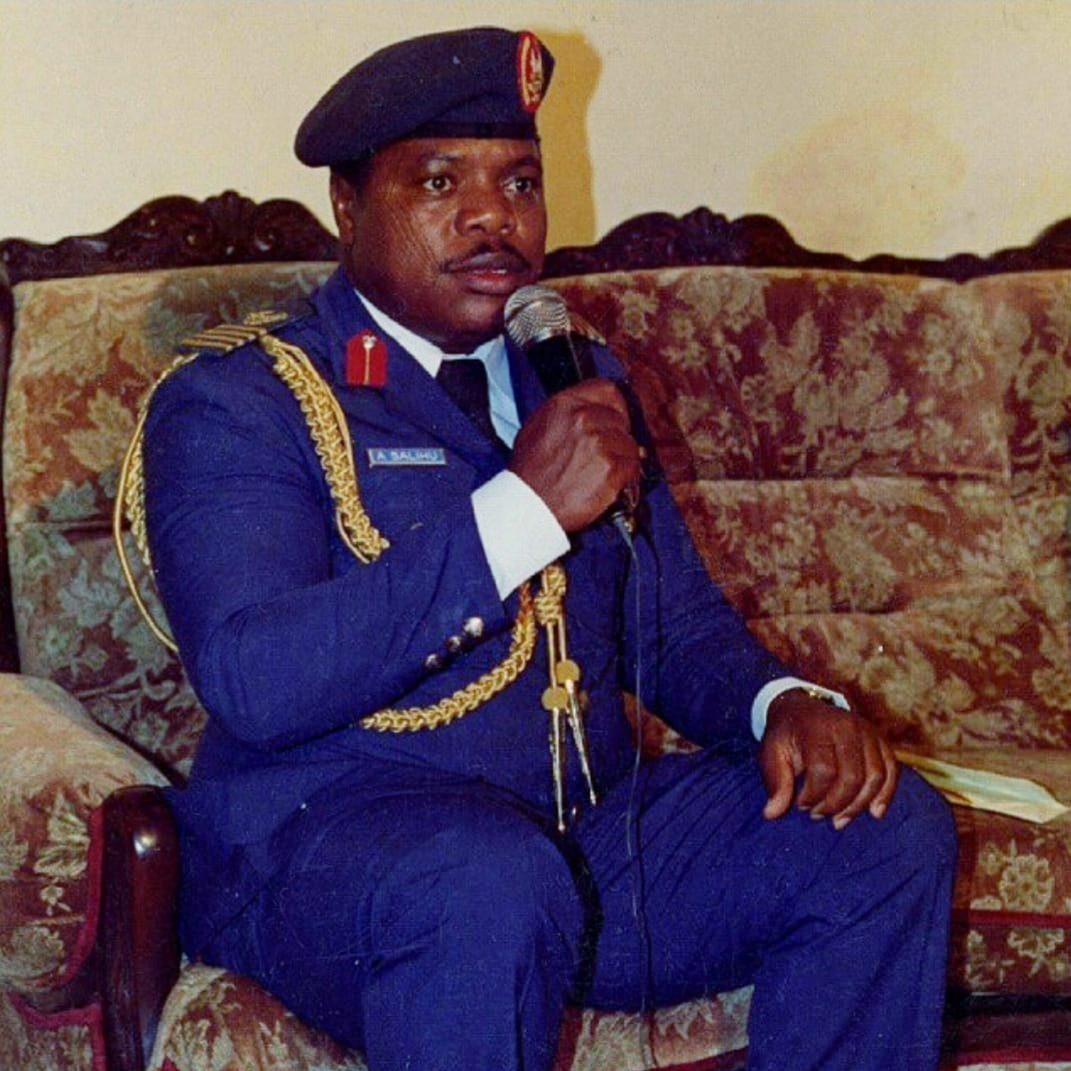

Governor of Gongola State
- In office December 1989 – 27 August 1991
- Preceded by: Isa Mohammed
- Succeeded by: position abolished Adeyemi Afolahan (Taraba State); Self (Adamawa State)

Governor of Adamawa State
- In office 27 August 1991 – January 1992
- Preceded by: position established
- Succeeded by: Abubakar Saleh Michika

Personal details
- Born: 1949
- Died: 9 January 2020 (aged 70)

Air Commodore Abubakar Salihu (1949 – 9 January 2020) was a Nigerian Air Force officer who was appointed military governor of Gongola and Adamawa States. He also served in many senior level defence military roles.

== Early career ==
Salihu was born in 1949 in Kamba, Kebbi State. He later attended Barewa College, Zaria, Kaduna State. Upon completing Barewa College, Salihu enlisted into the Nigerian Defence Academy (NDA). He commissioned as a Regular Officer in NDA's Combatant Course.

He completed the Aircraft Technical Officer's Course in West Germany, and studied at the Royal Military Training Centre in Chichester, England.

He served as Air Force Deputy Defence Attaché to the UK (1986-1990).

As a Group Captain he was appointed Military Governor of Gongola State in December 1989 by General Ibrahim Babangida. After the state was split on 27 August 1991 into Adamawa State and Taraba State, he continued as governor of Adamawa State until January 1992.

During his term in office, Gongola state suffered severe financial constraints.

The Adamawa State Polytechnic was established in 1991 while he was in office through a merger of the College of Preliminary Studies Yola and the Staff Development Institute Numan.

== Later career ==
Salihu later served under General I. D. Gumel as Air Force's Deputy Chief of Defence Intelligence, Lagos.

He attended National Institute of Policy and Strategic Studies (NIPSS) Kuru, Plateau State before serving as commandant deputy, National War College, Abuja.

After retiring as an Air Commodore, Salihu remained influential in politics. In December 2009, he was among northern leaders resisting the transfer of power to Vice-President Goodluck Jonathan during the incapacity of President Umaru Yar'Adua.
