= Bamanga Tukur =

Nigerian businessman and politician (1935–2026)

Alhaji Bamanga Tukur Tafidan Adamawa

Governor of Gongola State
- In office October 1983 – December 1983
- Preceded by: Wilberforce Juta
- Succeeded by: Mohammed Jega

National Chairman People's Democratic Party (PDP)
- In office March 2012 – January 2014
- Succeeded by: Adamu Mu'azu

Personal details
- Born: 15 September 1935
- Died: 12 September 2026 (aged 90)
- Party: People's Democratic Party (PDP)
- Spouse: Hajiya Fatima Tukur
- Relations: Mahmud Tukur
- Children: Awwal Tukur
- Occupation: People's Democratic Party (PDP) National chairman
- Profession: Politician, businessman

Bamanga Muhammad Tukur CON (15 September 1935 – 12 September 2026) was a Nigerian businessman and politician who was Minister for Industries under the administration of General Sani Abacha during the 1990s. He was one of the high-profile civil servants and military officers who acquired large area of farmland along the various River Basin authorities. He was also the life patron of the Africa Business Roundtable (ABR), and was president. From March 2012 to January 2014, Tukur was National Chairman of the People's Democratic Party (PDP).

== Life and career ==
Bamanga Tukur was a resident of Adamawa State and was once the governor of the old Gongola State, which encompassed Adamawa and Taraba States. He was also a member of the board of Trustees of the People's Democratic Party (PDP). He came to national attention in the mid-1970s, as the general manager of the Nigerian Ports Authority, it was a time the agency was having problems with congestion as a result of a massive cement importation scheme that was started at the twilight of Yakubu Gowon's administration. During his tenure, the government built a few more seaports to ease the transaction cost associated with shipping and to ensure adequate facilities for Nigeria's import and export needs.

In 1982, he left his position as general manager and soon contested the Gongola gubernatorial race, which he won. Tukur was governor for three months before the democratic administration was curtailed by a military coup. After leaving the Gongola State House, he entered full scale entrepreneurship, and was the founder and chairman of BHI holdings (DADDO group of companies). In 1992, he was an unsuccessful presidential candidate for the National Republican Convention, during which he and a few rivals of Adamu Ciroma lobbied for the cancellation of the first primary due to allegations of favouritism levelled against the leadership of the party.

Tukur was the Chair of NEPAD Business Group and Executive President of African Business Roundtable (ABR). From 1975 to 1982, Tukur was Chief Executive of the Nigerian Ports Authority. In 1983, he was elected civilian Governor of Gongola State (now Adamawa State). From 1993 to 1995, he was a member of the Federal Executive Council and Minister of Industry of Nigeria. He was Honorary Life President of the west and central Africa Ports Management Association, and a member of various Chambers of Commerce in Nigeria. He was a member of the UNIDO International Business Advisory Council, the Ghana Investors Advisory Council and the OECD Africa Investment Advisory Board. He was elected Chairman of the NEPAD Business Group in March 2002. Tukur was Chairman of Advisory Board at Africa investor Ltd. and also was chairman of the board at African Investment Advisory. Tukur was awarded the Doctorate Degree of Law (Honoris Causa) by Benue State University, Makurdi, Nigeria and was a fellow of the Nigerian Institute of Transport Technology, Zaria. He also had an MSc from the University of Pittsburgh. He was awarded the National Honour of the Commander of the Order of the Mono (COM), and the National Honour of the Commander of the Order of the Niger (CON) in recognition of his contribution to business in Africa. He held the traditional title of Tafidan Adamawa and Wakilin Ganye in Adamawa State.

With the support of President Goodluck Jonathan, Tukur was elected as National Chairman of the PDP, Nigeria's governing party, in March 2012.

Tukur died on 12 September 2026, at the age of 90.

== Faction within his party ==
On 31 August 2013, the chairmanship of Bamanga was openly challenged when seven governors, including Nyako from Adamawa state, 22 senators and 57 members of House of Representatives, all from the PDP, were led by former Vice-President Atiku Abubakar to declare a 'New PDP' with Alhaji Abubakar Kawu Baraje as its chairman. The governors were:

- Murtala Nyako from Adamawa State,
- Sule Lamido of Jigawa State,
- Rabiu Kwankwaso of Kano State,
- Abdulfatah Ahmed of Kwara State,
- Mu'azu Babangida Aliyu of Niger State,
- Chibuike Amaechi of Rivers State and
- Aliyu Magatakarda Wamakko of Sokoto State.

On 15 January 2014, Tukur resigned as Chairman of the PDP. Tukur had insisted that he would not resign, saying that it was only the party's convention that could remove him, but he was said to have been pressured to resign by his son, Anwal.

== Sources ==
- William Reno, Warlord politics and African states, Lynne Rienner Publishers; (July 1999). ISBN 1-55587-883-0
- Aiele, Obi (1 September 2007). "Alhaji Bamanga Tukur – the Business Face of Africa". This Day via allAfrica.com. Leaders & Company Limited.
- "Dr Alhaji Bamanga Tukur". Ai Index Awards.
