= Abdul Rahman Mamudu =

Major General Abdul Rahman Alhaji Mamudu fss, mni, psc

Military Governor of Gongola State
- In office July 1978 – October 1979
- Preceded by: Mohammed Jega
- Succeeded by: Abubakar Barde

Personal details
- Born: 13 March 1937 Amoke, Benue State
- Died: 12 April 1992 (aged 55)

Military service
- Allegiance: Nigeria
- Branch/service: Nigerian Army
- Years of service: 1960 - 1983
- Rank: Major General
- Battles/wars: Nigerian Civil War

Major General Abdul Rahman Alhaji Mamudu (13 March 1937 – 12 April 1992) was military Governor of Gongola State, Nigeria between July 1978 and October 1979 during the military regime of General Olusegun Obasanjo.

== Education ==
Dekina Primary School, 1946-1950
Okene Middle School, 1951-1952
Okene Provincial Secondary School, 1953-1958

== Military career ==
In 1959, Mamudu joined the Nigerian regiment and was trained at the Mons Officer Cadet School and the prestigious Royal Military Academy, Sandhurst. He was also an alumnus of the National Institute of Policy and Strategic Studies

Officer Commanding, 3 Signal Company, 1963
Officer Commanding, 21C Signal Company, 1964-1966
Officer Commanding, 1 Signal Company, 1966-1967
Commanding Officer, Signal Regiment, 1967-1970
Commander, 1 Signal Brigade, 1970-1972

During the aftermath of the coup that brought General Yakubu Gowon to power in July 1966, there were numerous killings of Igbos in the North, including both civilians and army personnel. Mamudu, being one of the few officers, advised his Eastern soldiers to refrain from reporting to work in order to ensure their safety, which allowed them to escape to Biafra.In 1960 he was assistant platoon leader under Yakubu Gowon platoon, during the Congo war.

Later he was appointed Military Administrator of Gongola State (25 July 1978 to 30 September 1979) and a Commander of the Nigerian Army Signals Corps.

He retired in 1983, after over twenty-three years of active military service and went into private enterprise as a stevedore. Major General Abdulrahman Mamudu is from Agbede Town, Etsako West local government of Edo State.

=== National Honours ===
| Year | Country | Decoration | Presenter | Notes |
|---|---|---|---|---|
| | Nigeria | Forces Services Star (FSS); | Nigerian Army | Military Award |
