= Wilberforce Juta =

Nigerian politician (1944–2020)

Governor of Gongola State
- In office October 1983 – December 1983
- Preceded by: Abubakar Barde
- Succeeded by: Bamanga Tukur

Deputy Governor of Gongola State
- In office 1979–1983

Personal details
- Born: 3 May 1944
- Died: 15 August 2020 (aged 76)
- Education: Concordia College, Morehead, Minnesota, University of Iowa

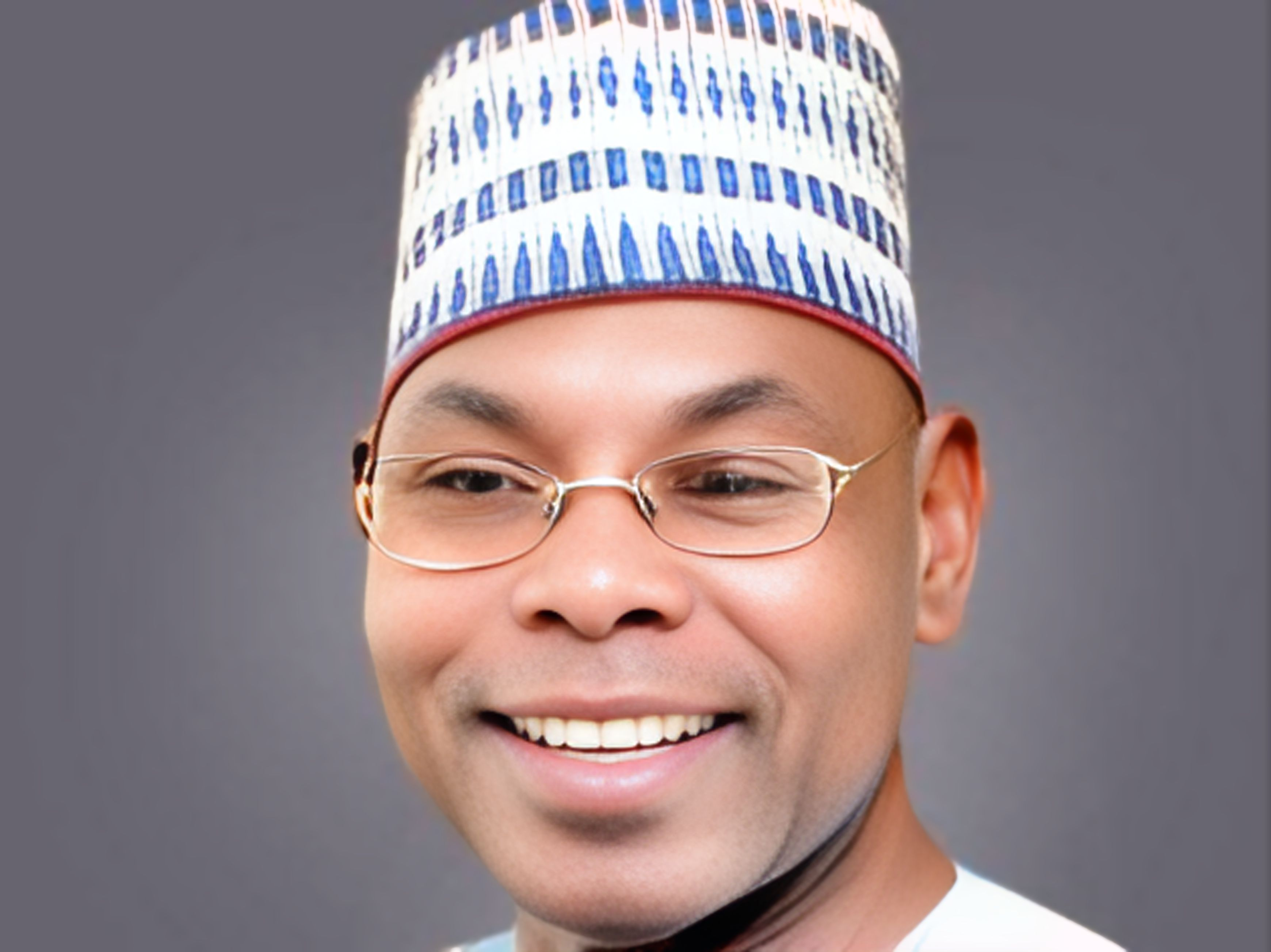
Wilberforce Juta

Wilberforce Juta (3 May 1944 – 15 August 2020) was a Nigerian politician who served as governor of Gongola State, Nigeria in 1983 during the Nigerian Second Republic, and later was appointed Nigerian High Commissioner to Zimbabwe.

== Background ==
Juta was a Njanyi by origin from Adamawa State, previously part of Gongola State. He received a bachelor's degree from Concordia College, Morehead, Minnesota in January 1970, and then studied for a master's degree in English Literature at the University of Iowa.

== Second Republic and subsequent military regime ==
Juta was elected as Deputy Governor of Gongola State on the platform of the Great Nigeria Peoples Party (GNPP) in 1979. When the Governor Abubakar Barde resigned early in 1983, Juta was appointed Governor. In January 1983, the state was affected by an outbreak of rinderpest. Despite a massive vaccination program, Juta reported that by June 1983 over 70,000 cattle had died. Juta left office in October 1983, when he was succeeded by Bamanga Tukur, who had been elected on the National Party of Nigeria platform.

On 31 December 1983, General Muhammadu Buhari took power in a military coup. On 17 April 1985, Juta was sentenced to 21 years imprisonment by a tribunal established to try ex-governors accused of corruption and abuse of power. Later that year the sentence was reduced to five years plus a fine. In July 1986, he was barred for life from holding public office. At the same time, his sentence was reduced to a three-year term.

== Fourth republic ==
Juta was one of the founders of the People's Democratic Party in Adamawa State in 1998. The PDP won the state and national elections in 1999. President Olusegun Obasanjo appointed him High Commissioner to Zimbabwe. Juta toured strife-ridden farms in August 2001, shortly after 21 white farmers had been released from jail. He urged Zimbabwe to resolve its problems in the interests of all its people irrespective of race. However, Ambassador Juta tended to whitewash Zimbabwe's simmering political and economic crisis.

As chairman of the Middle Belt Forum, in November 2009, Juta called for true federalism, with every state taking total control of its resources and paying a 75% tax to the center. He said that would ensure that every state develops their resources effectively and promote healthy competition, leading to prosperity for all.
