= Abubakar Barde =

Nigerian politician (1938–2002)

Governor of Gongola State
- In office October 1979 – 1983
- Deputy: Wilberforce Juta
- Preceded by: Abdul Rahman Mamudu
- Succeeded by: Wilberforce Juta

Personal details
- Born: 1938
- Died: 17 June 2002 (aged 63–64)
- Party: Great Nigeria People's Party

Alhaji Abubakar Barde (1938 - 17 June 2002) was Governor of Gongola State, Nigeria between October 1979 and September 1983 during the Nigerian Second Republic.

Barde was of Mumuye origin. He was elected governor on the platform of the Great Nigeria Peoples Party (GNPP), holding office from 1979 to September 1983. He inherited a backward and ethnically divided state, but did little to improve the situation. Many projects started by the previous regime were abandoned. He did initiate a project to establish the Gongola Television Corporation (now the Adamawa Television Corporation) in 1982, but this was abandoned when the military took power in December 1983.

In the Wukari Local Government Area, he appointed a Tiv leader as chairman, apparently because the Jukun people had not supported him. The Jukun had generally voted for the Nigerian Peoples Party (NPP). In August 1982, the Gongola State House of Assembly attempted without success to impeach Barde based on a 9-point allegation of gross misconduct. In 1983, Barde resigned, handing over power to his deputy Wilberforce Juta. As the 1983 elections drew closer, Barde left the GNPP for NPP, but was not reelected.

After General Mohammadu Buhari took power in the 31 December 1983 coup, Barde was arrested and imprisoned. Later, Barde was given the chieftaincy title of Dabang Yorro by the Mumuye Traditional Council in Yorro Local Government Area of Taraba State. Barde died in June, 2002.
