= Gongola State =

Former state of Nigeria

Coordinates: 8°30′N 11°45′E

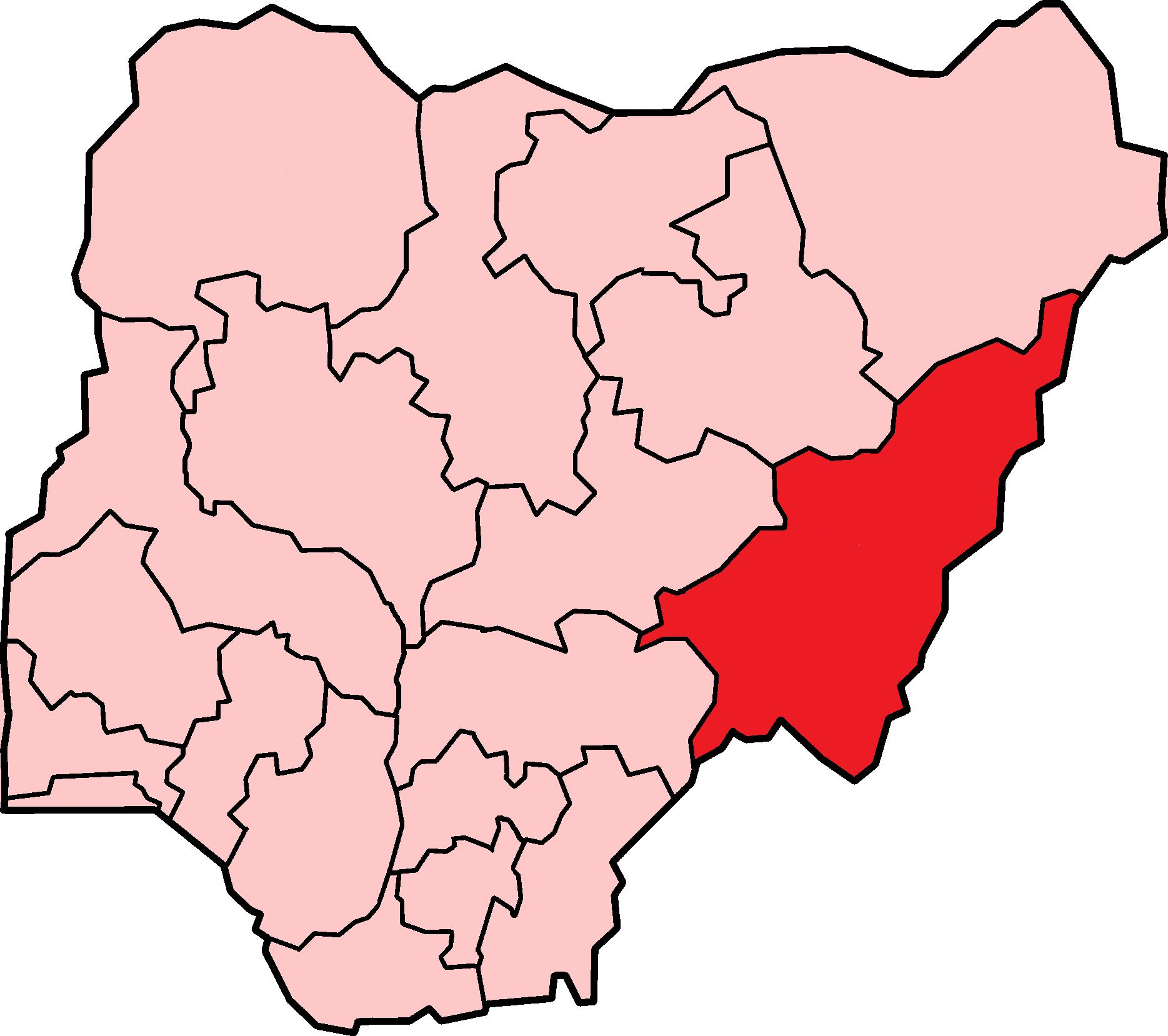
Location map of the Gongola State.

Gongola State is a former administrative division of Nigeria. It was created on 3 February 1976 from the Adamawa and Sardauna Provinces of North State, together with the Wukari Division of the then Benue-Plateau State. It existed until 27 August 1991, when it was divided into two states - Adamawa and Taraba. Its capital city was Yola.
