= 2023 Nigerian presidential election in Benue State =

- 25 February 2023
- Registered: 2,777,727
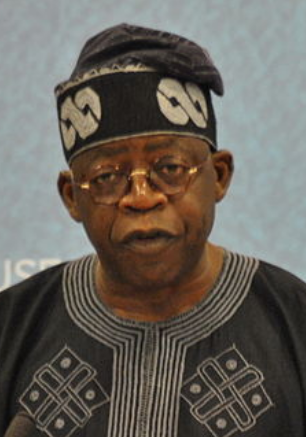

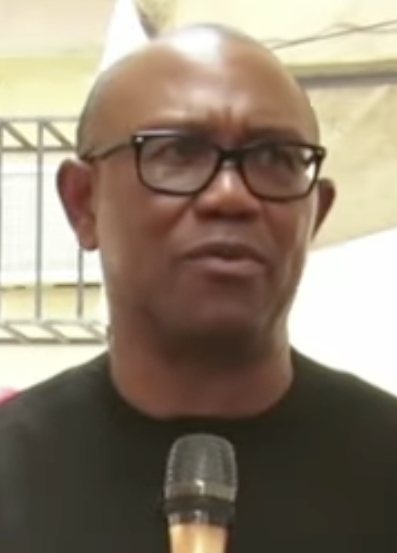

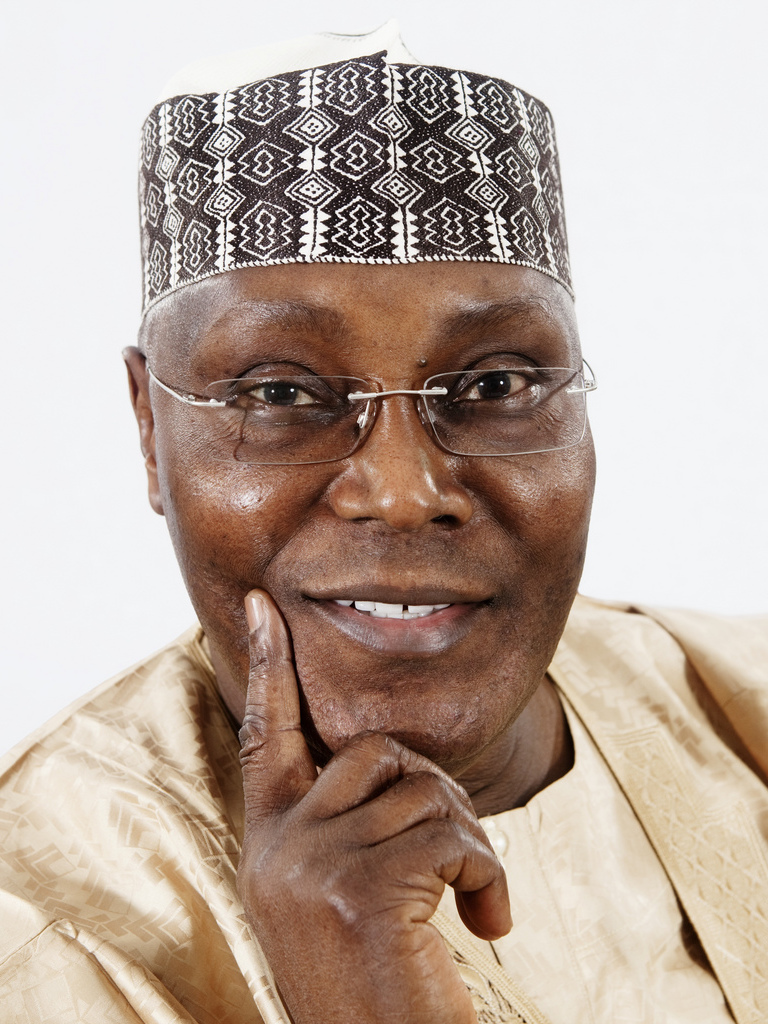
Nominee	Bola Tinubu	Peter Obi
Party	APC	LP
Home state	Lagos	Anambra
Running mate	Kashim Shettima	Yusuf Datti Baba-Ahmed
Nominee	Rabiu Kwankwaso	Atiku Abubakar
Party	New Nigeria Peoples Party	PDP
Home state	Kano	Adamawa
Running mate	Isaac Idahosa	Ifeanyi Okowa
President before election
Muhammadu Buhari
APC
Elected President
TBD

The 2023 Nigerian presidential election in Benue State will be held on 25 February 2023 as part of the nationwide 2023 Nigerian presidential election to elect the president and vice president of Nigeria. Other federal elections, including elections to the House of Representatives and the Senate, will also be held on the same date while state elections will be held two weeks afterward on 11 March.

== Background ==
Benue State located in Nigeria's Middle Belt; is a diverse agriculture-based state often nicknamed the "Food Basket of the Nation" due to its vast natural resources, Benue has faced challenges in security as inter-ethnic violence and conflict between herders and farmers heavily affect the state. The overproliferation of weaponry and increased pressure for land along with failures in governance led to the worsening of these clashes in the years ahead of the election.

Politically, Benue's 2019 elections saw a noticeable swing back towards the People's Democratic Party (PDP) in the aftermath of Ortom's 2018 defection back to the party. On the federal level, PDP nominee Atiku Abubakar narrowly won the state after Buhari had won it in 2015; legislatively, the PDP swept all three Senate seats and won seven House of Representatives seats. Statewise, PDP Governor Samuel Ortom won re-election by over 10% of the vote and the PDP won a majority in the House of Assembly.

== Polling ==
Polling organisation/client	Fieldwork date	Sample size					Others	Undecided	Undisclosed	Not voting
Polling organisation/client	Fieldwork date	Sample size	Tinubu APC	Obi LP	Kwankwaso NNPP	Abubakar PDP	Others	Undecided	Undisclosed	Not voting
BantuPage	January 2023	N/A	12%	49%	1%	6%	–	9%	20%	2%
Nextier (Benue crosstabs of national poll)	27 January 2023	N/A	30.3%	46.1%	–	20.2%	–	3.4%	–	–
SBM Intelligence for EiE (Benue crosstabs of national poll)	22 January-6 February 2023	N/A	4%	49%	–	2%	1%	43%	–	–

== Projections ==
Source	Projection		As of
Africa Elects (Note: Africa Elects projections predict the likelihood of a candidate winning a state by categorizing a state as "Safe" for exceedingly likely, "Likely" for somewhat likely, and "Lean" for least likely. If no clear determination could be made, states are categorized as "tossups".)	Likely Obi		24 February 2023
Dataphyte (Note: Dataphyte projections predict candidates' projected votal shares in each state.)
Dataphyte	Tinubu:	24.44%	11 February 2023
Dataphyte	Obi:	33.57%	11 February 2023
Dataphyte	Abubakar:	24.44%	11 February 2023
Dataphyte	Others:	17.54%	11 February 2023
Enough is Enough- SBM Intelligence (Note: EiE-SBM projections predict which candidates will win states.)	Obi		17 February 2023
SBM Intelligence (Note: SBM projections predict which candidates will win states or, if no determination could be made, categorizes states as "Too close to call" (TCC).)	Obi		15 December 2022
ThisDay (Note: ThisDay projections predict candidates' projected votal shares in each state.)
ThisDay	Tinubu:	20%	27 December 2022
ThisDay	Obi:	30%	27 December 2022
ThisDay	Kwankwaso:	10%	27 December 2022
ThisDay	Abubakar:	25%	27 December 2022
ThisDay	Others/Undecided:	15%	27 December 2022
The Nation (Note: SBM projections predict which candidates will win states or, if no determination could be made, categorizes states as "Battlegrounds.")	Battleground		12-19 February 2023

== General election ==
=== Results ===
2023 Nigerian presidential election in Benue State
Party	Candidate	Votes	%
A	Christopher Imumolen		
AA	Hamza al-Mustapha		
ADP	Yabagi Sani		
APP	Osita Nnadi		
AAC	Omoyele Sowore		
ADC	Dumebi Kachikwu		
APC	Bola Tinubu		
APGA	Peter Umeadi		
APM	Princess Chichi Ojei		
BP	Sunday Adenuga		
LP	Peter Obi		
NRM	Felix Johnson Osakwe		
New Nigeria Peoples Party	Rabiu Kwankwaso		
PRP	Kola Abiola		
PDP	Atiku Abubakar		
SDP	Adewole Adebayo		
YPP	Malik Ado-Ibrahim		
ZLP	Dan Nwanyanwu		
Total votes			100.00%
Invalid or blank votes			N/A
Turnout			

==== By senatorial district ====
The results of the election by senatorial district.

Senatorial district	Bola Tinubu APC		Atiku Abubakar PDP		Peter Obi LP		Rabiu Kwankwaso NNPP		Others		Total valid votes
Senatorial district	Votes	%	Votes	%	Votes	%	Votes	%	Votes	%	Total valid votes
Benue North-East Senatorial District (Note: Comprising the local government areas of Katsina-Ala, Konshisha, Kwande, Logo, Vandeikya, Ukum, and Ushongo.) (Zone A)	TBD	%	TBD	%	TBD	%	TBD	%	TBD	%	TBD
Benue North-West Senatorial District (Note: Comprising the local government areas of Buruku, Gboko, Gwer East, Gwer West, Guma, Makurdi, and Tarka.) (Zone B)	TBD	%	TBD	%	TBD	%	TBD	%	TBD	%	TBD
Benue South Senatorial District (Note: Comprising the local government areas of Ado, Agatu, Apa, Obi, Ogbadibo, Ohimini, Oju, Okpokwu, and Otukpo.) (Zone C)	TBD	%	TBD	%	TBD	%	TBD	%	TBD	%	TBD
Totals	TBD	%	TBD	%	TBD	%	TBD	%	TBD	%	TBD

==== By federal constituency ====
The results of the election by federal constituency.

Federal constituency	Bola Tinubu APC		Atiku Abubakar PDP		Peter Obi LP		Rabiu Kwankwaso NNPP		Others		Total valid votes
Federal constituency	Votes	%	Votes	%	Votes	%	Votes	%	Votes	%	Total valid votes
Ado/Ogbadibo/Okpokwu Federal Constituency (Note: Comprising the local government areas of Ado, Ogbadibo, and Okpokwu.)	TBD	%	TBD	%	TBD	%	TBD	%	TBD	%	TBD
Apa/Agatu Federal Constituency (Note: Comprising the local government areas of Apa and Agatu.)	TBD	%	TBD	%	TBD	%	TBD	%	TBD	%	TBD
Buruku Federal Constituency (Note: Comprising the local government area of Buruku.)	TBD	%	TBD	%	TBD	%	TBD	%	TBD	%	TBD
Gboko/Tarka Federal Constituency (Note: Comprising the local government areas of Gboko and Tarka.)	TBD	%	TBD	%	TBD	%	TBD	%	TBD	%	TBD
Guma/Makurdi Federal Constituency (Note: Comprising the local government areas of Guma and Makurdi.)	TBD	%	TBD	%	TBD	%	TBD	%	TBD	%	TBD
Gwer East/Gwer West Federal Constituency (Note: Comprising the local government areas of Gwer East and Gwer West.)	TBD	%	TBD	%	TBD	%	TBD	%	TBD	%	TBD
Katsina-Ala/Ukum/Logo Federal Constituency (Note: Comprising the local government areas of Katsina-Ala, Logo. and Ukum.)	TBD	%	TBD	%	TBD	%	TBD	%	TBD	%	TBD
Konshisha/Vandeikya Federal Constituency (Note: Comprising the local government areas of Konshisha and Vandeikya.)	TBD	%	TBD	%	TBD	%	TBD	%	TBD	%	TBD
Kwande/Ushongo Federal Constituency (Note: Comprising the local government areas of Kwande and Ushongo.)	TBD	%	TBD	%	TBD	%	TBD	%	TBD	%	TBD
Oju/Obi Federal Constituency (Note: Comprising the local government areas of Obi and Oju.)	TBD	%	TBD	%	TBD	%	TBD	%	TBD	%	TBD
Otukpo/Ohimini Federal Constituency (Note: Comprising the local government areas of Ohimini and Otukpo.)	TBD	%	TBD	%	TBD	%	TBD	%	TBD	%	TBD
Totals	TBD	%	TBD	%	TBD	%	TBD	%	TBD	%	TBD

==== By local government area ====
The results of the election by local government area.

Local government area	Bola Tinubu APC		Atiku Abubakar PDP		Peter Obi LP		Rabiu Kwankwaso NNPP		Others		Total valid votes	Turnout (%)
Local government area	Votes	%	Votes	%	Votes	%	Votes	%	Votes	%	Total valid votes	Turnout (%)
Ado	TBD	%	TBD	%	TBD	%	TBD	%	TBD	%	TBD	%
Agatu	TBD	%	TBD	%	TBD	%	TBD	%	TBD	%	TBD	%
Apa	TBD	%	TBD	%	TBD	%	TBD	%	TBD	%	TBD	%
Buruku	TBD	%	TBD	%	TBD	%	TBD	%	TBD	%	TBD	%
Gboko	TBD	%	TBD	%	TBD	%	TBD	%	TBD	%	TBD	%
Guma	TBD	%	TBD	%	TBD	%	TBD	%	TBD	%	TBD	%
Gwer East	TBD	%	TBD	%	TBD	%	TBD	%	TBD	%	TBD	%
Gwer West	TBD	%	TBD	%	TBD	%	TBD	%	TBD	%	TBD	%
Katsina-Ala	TBD	%	TBD	%	TBD	%	TBD	%	TBD	%	TBD	%
Konshisha	TBD	%	TBD	%	TBD	%	TBD	%	TBD	%	TBD	%
Kwande	TBD	%	TBD	%	TBD	%	TBD	%	TBD	%	TBD	%
Logo	TBD	%	TBD	%	TBD	%	TBD	%	TBD	%	TBD	%
Makurdi	TBD	%	TBD	%	TBD	%	TBD	%	TBD	%	TBD	%
Obi	TBD	%	TBD	%	TBD	%	TBD	%	TBD	%	TBD	%
Ogbadibo	TBD	%	TBD	%	TBD	%	TBD	%	TBD	%	TBD	%
Ohimini	TBD	%	TBD	%	TBD	%	TBD	%	TBD	%	TBD	%
Oju	TBD	%	TBD	%	TBD	%	TBD	%	TBD	%	TBD	%
Okpokwu	TBD	%	TBD	%	TBD	%	TBD	%	TBD	%	TBD	%
Otukpo	TBD	%	TBD	%	TBD	%	TBD	%	TBD	%	TBD	%
Tarka	TBD	%	TBD	%	TBD	%	TBD	%	TBD	%	TBD	%
Ukum	TBD	%	TBD	%	TBD	%	TBD	%	TBD	%	TBD	%
Ushongo	TBD	%	TBD	%	TBD	%	TBD	%	TBD	%	TBD	%
Vandeikya	TBD	%	TBD	%	TBD	%	TBD	%	TBD	%	TBD	%
Totals	TBD	%	TBD	%	TBD	%	TBD	%	TBD	%	TBD	%

== See also ==
- 2023 Benue State elections
- 2023 Nigerian presidential election
