= Benue South senatorial district =

Senatorial district in Nigeria

Benue South senatorial district covers Ado, Agatu, Apa, Obi, Ogbadibo, Ohimini, Oju, Okpokwu, Otukpo and Gboko. The district has produced two Senate presidents, Ameh Ebute who was president in the third republic and shortest serving president, and David Mark, the longest serving president of the Nigerian Senate. It is the only district to produce two Senate presidents with Benue State being the only state to produce three Senate presidents with Iyorchia Ayu from Benue North-West also serving as Senate president in the third republic. David Mark was first elected in 1999 and left at the end of his 5th term in the Senate in 2019 (after serving for 20 years). The current representative of Benue South is Abba Moro of the People's Democratic Party, PDP.

== List of senators from Benue South ==
Senator	Party	Year	Assembly
Ameh Ebute	SDP	5 December 1992 – 17 November 1993 (President of the Senate)	3rd
David Mark	PDP	3 June 1999 – 9 June 2019	4th, 5th, 6th (President of the Senate), 7th (President of the Senate), 8th
Patrick Abba Moro	PDP	11 June 2019 – Present	9th, 10th
