= Igede Agba =

- Genre: Festivals
- Location: Benue State
- Country: Nigeria
- Founder: Ogbaji Daniel Ukenya
- People: Igede

Igede Agba is an annual New Yam festival celebrated by the Igede people of Oju and Obi Local Government Areas in Benue State, Nigeria. The festival, celebrated in cycles, takes place on the first “Ihigile market day” of September—recognized in the Igede calendar as the seventh moon, “Oya,” a number imbued with deep spiritual significance. The festival serves as a thanksgiving ceremony to Ohe Oluhye (Sky-God) and Ohe Oleji (Earth-god) for a successful harvest and as a prayer for abundance in the coming planting season.

== Agricultural and seasonal significance ==
The Igede Agba festival is cornerstone of agriculture life among the Igede people and is deeply rooted in the agrarian lifestyle of the Igede people of Benue State, Nigeria. It serves as an annual thanksgiving to God for a successful and bountiful harvest, particularly of yams, which are the most revered crop in the region. The festival also marks the beginning of a new agricultural cycle, symbolizing the transition from harvest to the next planting season.

Yam (Iju, pronounced as "ee-joo") holds a central place in the celebration and in Igede society at large. It is considered the "king" of all farm produce, and the size of a man's yam farm is traditionally viewed as a measure of his wealth and social standing. As such, the cultivation and presentation of yams during the festival carry both spiritual and cultural significance.

A strict taboo prohibits the harvesting of new yams prior to the festival's official declaration, which is governed by the Akpang—gods of the land. It is considered inappropriate and disrespectful to harvest or consume new yams before they are ritually sanctioned. This rite is performed in August and serves to purify the land, protect the community, and ensure that yams are fully mature before consumption. Furthermore, participants are expected to celebrate using yams harvested from their own farms. Purchasing yams from the market for the festival is discouraged, as it undermines the personal connection to the land and the authenticity of the thanksgiving ritual.

== Rituals ==
Central to the celebration of the Igede Agba festival is the ritual of thanksgiving to God for a successful farming season, with particular emphasis on yam cultivation. Yam is regarded as the most important crop and is symbolically referred to as the "king" of farm produce.

One of the most symbolic practices is the gathering of family members in designated huts: male children assemble in the father’s round hut (Ugara), while wives and female children gather in the senior wife's hut. Meals begin with the father washing his hands, followed by the most senior son, and then others in hierarchical order. This ritual emphasizes respect, discipline, and the importance of lineage. A central tradition involves all family members washing their hands together in a single bowl or calabash before eating. This act is considered an unwritten covenant of unity, symbolizing a pledge to maintain peace and avoid harboring resentment.

The festival also marks the beginning of a new planting season. Cultural norms strictly prohibit the harvesting or consumption of new yams before the festival is officially declared. This taboo is observed to honor ancestral traditions and maintain spiritual harmony within the community.

Participants are expected to celebrate using yams harvested from their own farms, rather than purchasing them from the market. This practice emphasizes self-reliance and personal connection to the land. It also reinforces the authenticity of the thanksgiving ritual, as each household presents the fruits of its labor in a communal setting.

The festival also includes the preparation of pounded yam served with traditional soups, often made from chicken, goat, or cow meat. Cultural dances, masquerades, fashion displays, and beauty contests (Adiya) are common. The day is marked by generosity, with food and gifts exchanged freely among neighbors, friends, and visitors. Clearing footpaths between homes is a customary gesture of hospitality.
