= 2007 Nigerian Senate elections in Benue State =

2007 Nigerian Senate election in Benue State

The 2007 Nigerian Senate election in Benue State was held on 21 April 2007, to elect members of the Nigerian Senate to represent Benue State. David Mark representing Benue South, George Akume representing Benue North-West and Joseph Akaagerger representing Benue North-East all won on the platform of the Peoples Democratic Party.

== Overview ==
Affiliation	Party		Total
Affiliation	PDP	AC	Total
Before Election			3
After Election	3	0	3

== Summary ==
District	Incumbent	Party	Elected Senator	Party
Benue South			David Mark	PDP
Benue North-West			George Akume	PDP
Benue North-East			Joseph Akaagerger	PDP

== Results ==
=== Benue South ===
The election was won by David Mark of the Peoples Democratic Party.

2007 Nigerian Senate election in Benue State
Party	Candidate	Votes	%
PDP	David Mark		
Total votes			
PDP hold			

=== Benue North-West ===
The election was won by George Akume of the Peoples Democratic Party.

2007 Nigerian Senate election in Benue State
Party	Candidate	Votes	%
PDP	George Akume		
Total votes			
PDP hold			

=== Benue North-East ===
The election was won by Joseph Akaagerger of the Peoples Democratic Party.

2007 Nigerian Senate election in Benue State
Party	Candidate	Votes	%
PDP	Joseph Akaagerger		
Total votes			
PDP hold			
