= 2011 Nigerian Senate elections in Benue State =

2011 Nigerian Senate election in Benue State

The 2011 Nigerian Senate election in Benue State was held on April 9, 2011, to elect members of the Nigerian Senate to represent Benue State. Barnabas Andyar Gemade representing Benue North East and David Mark representing Benue South won on the platform of Peoples Democratic Party, while George Akume representing Benue North West won on the platform of Action Congress of Nigeria.

== Overview ==
| Affiliation | Party | | Total |
| Affiliation | PDP | ACN | Total |
|---|---|---|---|
| Before Election | | | 3 |
| After Election | 2 | 1 | 3 |

== Summary ==
| District | Incumbent | Party | Elected Senator | Party |
|---|---|---|---|---|
| Benue North East | | | Barnabas Andyar Gemade | PDP |
| Benue South | | | David Mark | PDP |
| Benue North West | | | George Akume | ACN |

== Results ==
=== Benue North East ===
Peoples Democratic Party candidate Barnabas Andyar Gemade won the election, defeating other party candidates.

2011 Nigerian Senate election in Benue State
| Party | Candidate | Votes | % |
|---|---|---|---|
| PDP | Barnabas Andyar Gemade | | |
| Total votes | | | |
| PDP hold | | | |

=== Benue South ===
Peoples Democratic Party candidate David Mark won the election, defeating other party candidates.

2011 Nigerian Senate election in Benue State
| Party | Candidate | Votes | % |
|---|---|---|---|
| PDP | David Mark | | |
| Total votes | | | |
| PDP hold | | | |

=== Benue North West ===
Action Congress of Nigeria candidate George Akume won the election, defeating other party candidates.

2011 Nigerian Senate election in Benue State
| Party | Candidate | Votes | % |
|---|---|---|---|
| ACN | George Akume | | |
| Total votes | | | |
| ACN hold | | | |
