= 2003 Nigerian Senate elections in Benue State =

The 2003 Nigerian Senate election in Benue State was held on April 12, 2003, to elect members of the Nigerian Senate to represent Benue State. David Mark representing Benue South and Joshua Adagba representing Benue North-West won on the platform of the Peoples Democratic Party, while Daniel Saror representing Benue North-East won on the platform of the All Nigeria Peoples Party.

== Overview ==
Affiliation	Party		Total
Affiliation	PDP	ANPP	Total
Before Election			3
After Election	2	1	3

== Summary ==
District	Incumbent	Party	Elected Senator	Party
Benue South			David Mark	PDP
Benue North-West			Joshua Adagba	PDP
Benue North-East			Daniel Saror	ANPP

== Results ==
=== Benue South ===
The election was won by David Mark of the Peoples Democratic Party.

2003 Nigerian Senate election in Benue State
Party	Candidate	Votes	%
PDP	David Mark		
Total votes			
PDP hold			

=== Benue North-West ===
The election was won by Joshua Adagba of the Peoples Democratic Party.

2003 Nigerian Senate election in Benue State
Party	Candidate	Votes	%
PDP	Joshua Adagba		
Total votes			
PDP hold			

=== Benue North-East ===
The election was won by Daniel Saror of the All Nigeria Peoples Party.

2003 Nigerian Senate election in Benue State
Party	Candidate	Votes	%
ANPP	Daniel Saror		
Total votes			
ANPP hold			
