= Igede (disambiguation) =

The Igede are an ethnic group in Nigeria.

Igede may also refer to:

- The Igede language
- Igede-Ekiti in Ekiti State of Nigeria
