= Abba Moro =

Nigerian politician

Patrick Abba Moro

Senator of the Federal Republic of Nigeria from Benue South senatorial district
- Incumbent
- Assumed office 11 June 2019
- Preceded by: David Mark

Minister of the Interior
- In office July 2011 – May 2015
- Preceded by: Emmanuel Iheanacho
- Succeeded by: A.B. Dambazzau

Personal details
- Born: 3 July 1956 (age 70) Okpokwu, Benue State, Nigeria
- Party: PDP
- Spouse: Late Veronica Linda Moro

Patrick Abba Moro (//; born 3 July 1956) is a Nigerian educational administrator, politician and former Minister of the Federal Ministry of Interior. He is currently the Pro-Chancellor and Chairman Governing Council of the University of Agriculture, Makurdi. In 2019, he was elected into the Senate of the Federal Republic of Nigeria replacing David Mark, a two-term senate president (6th and 7th Assembly) and one of the longest serving Senators in Nigeria.

== Early life ==
Moro was born on 3 July 1956, in Okpokwu Local Government Area of Benue State, Nigeria. He had his primary education at LGEA special Primary School, Odessassa between 1963 and 1969. He later attended Emmanuel Secondary School at Ugbokolo from 1969 to 1974 before he proceeded to Federal Government College, Kano where he obtained a Higher School Certificate (HSC) in 1975. He proceeded to the University of Lagos where he obtained a Bachelor of Science (B. sc) degree in Political Science and Master of Science (M. sc) degree in Public Administration in 1980 and 1983 respectively.

== Academic career ==
Moro began his academic career at Benue State Polytechnic as a lecturer where he served as head of the Department of General Studies for one year (1991-1992) and head of the department of Public Administration for four years (1992-1996) and later as dean of studies, School of Business and Administration Studies. He served in that capacity for two years (1994-1996). He was later elected as chairman of the Benue State Polytechnic chapter of Senior Staff Association of Nigeria. He served in that capacity for four years (1980 - 1984) before he was elected as the National President of Polytechnic Senior Staff of Nigeria in 1986.

== Political career ==
Moro began his political career as elected Chairman of Okpokwu Local Government Council in 1998. He was the People's Democratic Party candidate for the April 2007 Benue state governorship election but lost to the opposition party and in July 2011, he was appointed as honorable Minister of the Federal Ministry Of Interior by Goodluck Ebele Jonathan, the president of the Federal Republic of Nigeria. Moro was sued to court for fraud over a botched recruitment drive, which resulted in stampedes that left 20 people dead in 2014 and is currently facing trials. Moro was charged with fraud in relation to the stampede. Moro has pleaded not guilty to his role in an alleged $2.5m (£1.8m) fraud, involving missing application fees. He was also charged to court by EFCC, over fatal N677m Immigration recruitment scam in 2014. Moro of the People's Democratic Party (PDP) has emerged winner of the Benue South senatorial election. Moro scored 85,162 votes to beat his main challenger, Steven Lawani of the All Progressives Congress (APC) who polled 47,972.

== Awards and honours ==
Patrick Moro had received several awards. Including:

- Best peacemaker Award by MOO in Idoma land Otukpo.
- Award of Excellent contribution to education and development by National PTA
- Award for distinction in Industrial Development by NULGE Benue State Chapter
- Benue State Council NUT Honours Award Makurdi for the Best performing LGA Chairman 2001

== See also ==
- Emmanuel Iheanacho
