= Naka Benue Nigeria =

Naka Benue Nigeria is the headquarters of Gwer West Local Government Area of Benue State, Nigeria. It has been known as the highest producer of Honey and Rice in the state. It has an area of 1,094 km² and a population of 122,145 at the 2006 census. It has 15 council wards and kindreds, The first paramount ruler was (late) Chief Gendaga Damna, and Chief Daniel Ayua Abomtse is the current paramount ruler. The current Chairman (transition/caretaker) is Hyacinth Kwegi. There are some other important settlements in the local government apart from the headquarters, these include; Bunaka, Agagbe, Nagi, Aondoana, Kula, Jimba, Anguhar, Atukpu, and Ajigba. Ikyande is another popular market in Gwer West Local Government Area. Naka Benue is a name one of the prominent founders of the town and grandson of Asha (Onmbaasha) Ahsa-Tor

In April 2018, Naka town was thrown into mourning when military men allegedly stormed the town and burnt down about 200 houses as reported by several media houses including the BBC. This was after herdsmen allegedly killed about 24 people in Mbakyondu village of the same Gwer West local government area.
