= Igede people =

Nigerian ethnic group

Igede
Total population
- c. 300,000-500,000

Regions with significant populations
- Nigeria: Benue State, Cross-River State, Ogun State, Osun State

Languages
- Igede

Religion
- Christianity, Traditional Religion

Related ethnic groups
- Idoma, Igbo, Tiv, Etulo, Cross-River Languages

The Igede people are a Nigerian ethnic group in Benue State of Nigeria. They are native to the Oju and Obi local government areas of Benue State, Nigeria, where 2006 population figures stand at an estimated 267,198 people. However, many Igede people are dispersed across the state and the Nation. For instance, the Igede language is also spoken in Nigeria's Cross River State, and many Igede communities exist in Osun State and Ogun State. The Igede language is a member of the Benue-Congo subgroup of the Niger-Congo language family.

== Geographical location ==
The Oju Local Government Area was created in 1976 and shares boundaries with present-day Obi, Ado, Konshisha and Gwer East Local Government Areas of Benue State, Ebonyi and Izzi Local Government Areas of Ebonyi State, and Yala Local Government Area of Cross River State. It is headquartered in Anyuwogbu, Ibilla.

The Obi Local Government Area was created in 1996 and has its headquarters at Obarike-Ito. The local government area derives its name from the Obi stream that flows in the area and shares boundary with Ado, Otukpo and Oju local government areas of Benue State.

== History ==
=== Origin: Oral tradition ===
The Igede trace their origin to Sabon Gida Ora in present-day Edo state. They are said to be the descendants of Agba, a high chief in Sabon Gida Ora. A skirmish between the Igede and the natives of Ora led to their migration from that region to present-day Benue state through Nsukka in Enugu state. This historical event in Igede history is commonly recounted in song and drama, for instance the record and drama piece "Ego ny'Igede".

=== Origin: Archival records ===
Archival records portray them as migrants from Ogoja province who later were group under one umbrella as Idoma. Idoma is an amalgamation of different tribes namely: Igede, Doma, Akpoto, Agatu, Akpa by the colonial masters for ease of administration. The Akpoto tribe was adopted as the general language language to spoken by all IDOMA.The letter ",i" in IDOMA stands for Igede tribe and Doma was from Doma tribe. Since two tribes were the dominant tribes, these two were coined together to form IDOMA. While the Doma people are no longer in Benue State, because they have LGA called Doma, in current Nasarawa State, the Igede has two LGAs called Oju and Obi and it appears the Igede people have detached themselves from the amalgamation Idoma.

== Administration and politics ==
Politically, the Igede falls under the Benue South senatorial district.

== Igede culture ==
The Igede are predominantly farmers cultivating maize, cassava, groundnut and yams. Igede is home of the popular Igede-Agba festival, a colourful annual celebration that marks the yam harvest season in September.

Igede traditional clothes are blue, black, and white stripes.

== Notable Igede people ==
- Ode Ojowu, Chief Economic Adviser to President Obasanjo and CEO National Planning Commission
- Oga Okwoche, Former Nigerian Ambassador to France
- Peter Okwoche, host of the BBC Focus on Africa TV news magazine programme
