= Ohimini =

- LGA
- Interactive map of Ohimini
- Country: Nigeria
- State: Benue State
- Local Government Headquarters: Idekpa

Government
  - Local Government Chairman and the Head of the Local Government Council: Adakole Abutu

Area
  - Total: 632 km^{2} (244 sq mi)

Population (2006)
  - Total: 71,482
- Time zone: UTC+1 (WAT)

Ohimini is a Local Government Area of Benue State, Nigeria. Its headquarters are in the town of Idekpa-Okpikwu. Ohimini was created out of the present Otukpo Local Government Area of Benue State. The major district under the Ohimini Local Government is Onyagede, which shares a boundary with Kogi State, and it has the following villages: Amoke, Enumona, Ogodu, Awume, Ikpoke, Ogoli, Ogande, Ugofu, Ipolabakpa, Umonomi, Iyaya, Okpikwu, Agadagba, Oglewu, and Idekpa, the capital.

It has an area of 632 km^{2} and a population of 71,482 at the 2006 census.

== Historical background ==
Ohimini Local Government Area of Benue State, Nigeria, was created in December 1996 by the military regime of General Sani Abacha from the old Otukpo Local Government of Idomaland along with four other local government councils (LGCs) in the state. These LGCs are Agatu, Obi, Logo, and Tarka. The Local Government derived its name “Ohimini” from River Ohimini, the largest river in the council, cutting across the entire local government area. The creation of the Local Government brought tremendous joy to its people who believed that the separation from the Old Otukpo would bring accelerated development to them.

== Geographical Location ==
Ohimini Local Government is bounded to the North and North East by Otukpo Local Government, South by Okpokwu Local Government, and on the West by Ankpa and Olamaboro Local Government Areas of Kogi State. The postal code of the area is 972.

== Population ==
The 2006 National Population Commission population census figures put the population of Ohimini as 70,688 people comprising 35,876 and 34,812 males and females respectively.

== Political Structure ==
The local government is divided into three zones A, B, and C with each zone comprising two clans. These are:

- A -- Ochobo and Oglewu clans
- B -- Agadagba and Okpikwu clans
- C – Awume and Onyagede clans.

The Local Government is further sub-divided into ten (10) political wards as follows;

S/N	Ward	Headquarters
1	Agadagba	Ohugbane
2	Awume-Ehaje	Ajegbe
3	Awume-Icho	Ejule
4	Ehatokpe (Okpiko)	Ugene
5	Idekpa (Okpiko)	Odelle
6	Ochobo	Ochobo
7	Oglewu-Ehaje	Atlo
8	Oglewu-Icho	Alaglanu
9	Onyagede-Ehaje	Abakpa
10	Onyagede-Icho	Ogoli

== Leadership of the Local Government Administration Since Inception ==
Since the creation of the Local Government in 1996, the following persons have headed the administration in various capacities either as Sole Administrators, Elected Executive Chairmen, Caretaker Committee Chairmen or Directors General Services and Administration (DGSA).

S/N	Name	Duration	Status/Designation
1	Mrs.Juliana Ajuma Alogwu	Dec.96 – April 97	Sole Administrator
2	Dr. Ocheme Adaji	April 97 – July 98	Elected Chairman
3	Mr. Hingah Biem	July 98 – May 99	Sole Administrator
4	Hon. Ezekiel Adaji	May 99 – June 2002	Elected Chairman
5	Late Hon. Matthias Elaigwu	May 2002 – July 2003	Caretaker Chairman
6	Hon. Ezekiel Adaji	July 2003—Feb. 2004	Caretaker Chairman
7	Hon. Isaac Ochekliye	Feb.2004—March 2004	Ag Chairman
8	Hon. Ezekiel Adaji	April 2004—April 2006	Elected Chairman
9	Hon Peter Uloko	Nov 2006—Dec 2006	Ag Chairman
10	Hon. Wilfred Adegene	Dec 2006 – June 2007	Caretaker Chairman
11	Hon. Paul Agashua	June 2007—July 2007	Chairman/DGSA
12	Hon. John Ameh	July 2007—Dec 2007	Caretaker Chairman
13	Sir Linus Onuh Ameh (KSJ)	Dec 2007—Dec 2010	Elected Chairman
14	Comrade Ogbole Isegbe	Dec 2010—Jan 2011	Ag Chairman/DGSA
15	Hon. Francis Eche Ijiga	Jan 2011—May 2012	Caretaker Chairman
16	Patrick Elem	10 May 2012 – 24 May 2012	Ag Chairman/DGSA
17	Rt.Hon. Abdulkarim Jibrin	May 2012—Nov.2012	Caretaker Chairman
18	Hon. Sunday Eche Mark	Nov.2012—Nov. 2014	Elected Chairman
19	Mr. Andrew Ejeh	Nov.2014 – April 2015	Ag Chairman
20	Hon Sunday Eche Mark	April 2015 – May 2015	Caretaker Chairman
21	Mr. Andrew Ejeh	May 2015—June 2015	Ag Chairman/DGSA
22	Comrade Musa Alechenue	June 2015—June 2016	Caretaker Chairman
23	Mr Michael Aba	June 2016 --	Ag Chairman/DGSA

Similarly, the legislative council of the Local Government was administered by the following officers as house leaders;

S/N	Name	Duration
1	Hon. Godwin Ejembi	May 99—June 2002
2	Hon. Victor Adem	April 2004—April 2006
3	Hon. Haruna Audu	Dec 2007—Dec 2010
4	Hon. Dave Agbo	Nov. 2012—Nov.2014

Note that legislative councils exist only when the executive councils are in place.

== Religion ==
The Ohimini people are basically Christians with pockets of Muslims mainly in Onyagede clan.

== Occupation ==
Ohimini is an agrarian society with the farmers taking full advantage of the fertile, well-drained arable land suitable for the cultivation of cassava, yams, millet, sorghum, rice, citrus fruits, palm produce, vegetables and livestock thus contributing to making the status of Benue State the “Food Basket of The Nation”.

It is believed that the Onyagede market (one of the largest market in Idoma land), is a major source of export of garri to neighbouring states like Plateau, Kano, Rivers and Kogi, amongst others.

Though large scale mechanized farming is not practiced by these peasant farmers, there is a bright future for investors of agro-based processing industries as they are assured of basic raw materials.

== Natural resources ==
According to the Federal Government Geological Survey of Benue State, bricks, clay, bentonite, bauxite and coal are found in abundant quantity in Ohimini for exploration. The natural spring waters at Iyaya in Onyagede and Odelle in Okpiko are yet to be developed.

== Prospects for investment ==
The new and developing Local Government is blessed with abundant human and natural resources that can sustain any agro-based industries and other investment.

Its easy accessibility from the eastern part of the country through Enugu in Enugu State, Ankpa in Kogi State, Naka in Gwer-West and Otukpo Local Government Areas both in Benue State as well as availability of constant power supply provided by its connection to the national grid make Ohimini a destination point for investors in Benue State.

== Climate ==
Ohimini experiences a tropical savanna climate marked by a humid rainy season and a dry season influenced by Harmattan winds. Annual rainfall ranges from 1,200 millimetres or 47 inches to 1,600 millimetres or 63 inches, and temperatures typically range between 23 °C (73 °F) and 34 °C (93 °F).
