= Swange =

Social dance and music genre of the Tiv people of Nigeria

- Genre: Urban recreational social dance and music
- Instrument(s): Drums (gbande), gong (kwen), trumpet (gida), horn (algaita)
- Inventor: Tiv people
- Year: c. 1948
- Origin: Benue State, central Nigeria

Swange is a social dance and popular music genre of the Tiv people of Benue State in central Nigeria. It is an urban recreational dance in which men and women dance together in a circle formation adapted from Tiv village dances, while traditional musical themes are set to highlife rhythms played on a combination of Tiv and Hausa instruments. A performance typically climaxes with a solo dancer improvising in rhythmic dialogue with the lead drummer. Swange is regarded as one of the most popular and widely performed Tiv music and dance forms, and it has been presented at national and international festivals by the Benue State Council for Arts and Culture.

== Origins and history ==
Swange developed among the Tiv, whose homeland lies on both sides of the Benue River in the Middle Belt of Nigeria, and among whom music, song (imo) and dance (amar) are closely intertwined aspects of social life.

Historians of the genre trace its evolution through several earlier Tiv musical forms. These include Ange, a satirical song and dance form said to have emerged in the late nineteenth century, and the one-man drumming performance Mtswen Gbande popularised by the musician Tyô Ulaga from 1934. In the colonial period, Tiv women organised fundraising gatherings known as gbanyi u mirin ("basin launching"), at which music and dance groups performed; from these gatherings a hybrid style called Gbanyi (or Gbangi) emerged, developed in the 1940s by the musician Yamuel (Yanmoel) Yashi, who introduced new dance steps and reorganised the music. According to Tsevende and colleagues, the name "Swange" arose around 1948 in Gboko as a re-pronunciation of the Tiv phrase sange ishor, associated with the new dance steps.

Scholars describe Swange as a product of urban life in towns such as Makurdi and Gboko, created as a recreational and expressive outlet for Tiv migrants, and at times as a vehicle of protest. During the colonial and early post-independence periods, some variants of the music attracted official disapproval: the Tiv Native Authority objected to the risqué Kpingi variant, although it was later publicly sanctioned during the reign of Tor Tiv III.

== Performance and instrumentation ==
Swange is a couple- and group-friendly social dance performed by both sexes, unusual among Tiv dance forms, and is danced at social and religious functions. The dance is characterised by undulating, flowing body movements performed at alternately slow and fast tempos. The accompanying music is heavily percussive, built on an ensemble of Tiv membranophones such as the gbande drums, idiophones such as the kwen (gong), and wind instruments including the gida (trumpet) and a sustained horn line played on the algaita, an instrument adopted from Hausa music. The blending of Tiv melodic material with highlife dance rhythms and Hausa instruments has led ethnomusicologists to treat Swange as an example of musical acculturation in twentieth-century Nigeria.

Swange songs are a recognised vehicle of social commentary. Composers use satirical lyrics and oral poetic forms to ridicule behaviour considered antisocial, and bands maintain repertoires for funerals, marriages, installations and festivals.

== Variants ==
Writers on the genre distinguish several named forms of Swange, including Tyôlyu, Ayev, Agbuu, Apolo Pue Teratar, Kpingi and Ngigh-Ngigh, as well as later styles associated with individual bandleaders. The Kpingi variant, which emerged in the urban milieu after the Nigerian Civil War, has been interpreted by the theatre scholar Saint Gbilekaa as a satirical attack on prostitution and moral permissiveness in Nigerian towns rather than a reflection of Tiv society itself.

== Social and political significance ==
Researchers have documented the use of Swange in Nigerian political life. Swange songs have voiced long-standing Tiv political aspirations, including agitation for the creation of additional states, and Swange troupes have performed at election campaign rallies of major Nigerian political parties from the Second Republic onwards. Earlier songs functioned as protest music against perceived Hausa–Fulani political domination of northern Nigeria. Awuawuer argues that the dance has become "a popular culture capable of sustaining … patterns of socio-political ideology", serving purposes of civic engagement, community education and political commentary as well as entertainment.

== Contemporary performance ==
Swange has been repositioned as a stage art by the Benue State Council for Arts and Culture, whose award-winning Swange troupe performs a choreographed contemporary version of the dance within and outside Nigeria. The troupe represented Nigeria at the centenary celebrations of Tel Aviv-Jaffa in Israel in 2009. Swange music and dance are also incorporated into performances of Kwagh-Hir, the composite Tiv theatrical art form inscribed by UNESCO on its list of intangible cultural heritage in need of urgent safeguarding.

== See also ==
- Kwagh-Hir
- Dance culture in Nigeria
- Music of Nigeria
