= Benue River =

Tributary of the Niger River in Cameroon and Nigeria

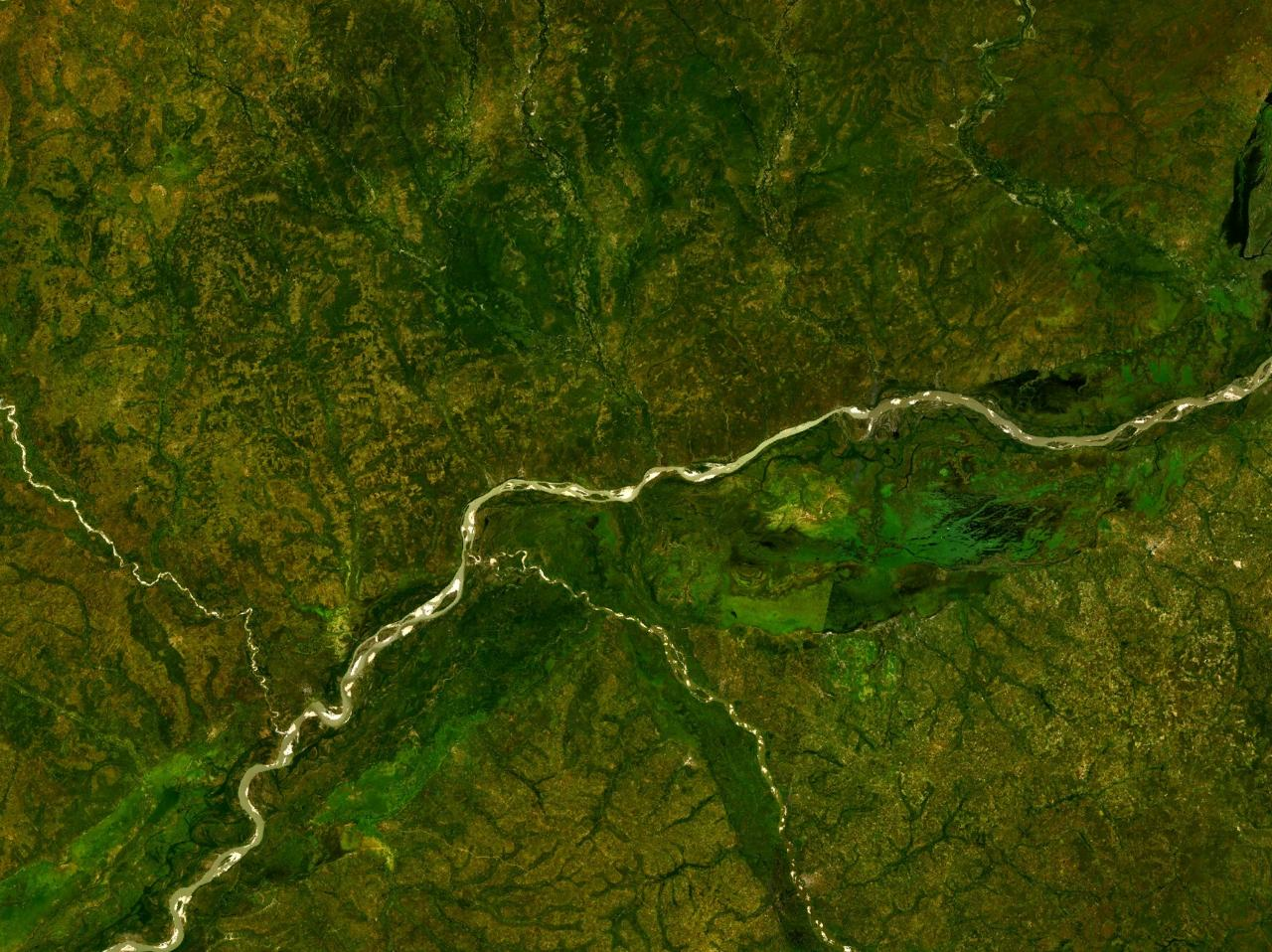

Location
- Countries: Cameroon; Nigeria

Physical characteristics
- Source
  - location: Adamawa Plateau
  - coordinates: 7°42′33.2712″N 13°26′35.3616″E
  - elevation: 1,340 m (4,400 ft)
- Mouth: Niger River
  - location: Lokoja, Nigeria
  - coordinates: 07°45′12″N 06°45′24″E
  - elevation: 35 m (115 ft)
- Length: 1,440 km (890 mi)
- Basin size: 319,000–338,200 km^{2} (123,200–130,600 mi^{2})
- Width
  - average: 488–976 m (1,601–3,202 ft)(Middle and Lower Benue)
  - maximum: 1.6 km (0.99 mi)(Lokoja)
- Discharge
  - location: Lokoja
  - average: 3,477 m^{3}/s (122,800 cu ft/s) (Note: Multiannual average: 3,477 m³/s, 3,400 m³/s (1914–1957), 3,244 m³/s (1970–2009), 4,580 m³/s (2010–2024))
- Discharge
  - location: Makurdi
  - average: 3,150 m^{3}/s (111,000 cu ft/s) (Note: Multiannual average: 3,150 m³/s (1914–1957), 2,984 m³/s (1930–1989), 3,468.24 m³/s (1955–2014), 3,257.2 m³/s (1980–2019), 4,155 m³/s (2010–2024))
  - minimum: 240 m^{3}/s (8,500 cu ft/s)
  - maximum: 12,000 m^{3}/s (420,000 cu ft/s)
- Discharge
  - location: Numan
  - average: 900 m^{3}/s (32,000 cu ft/s)
  - minimum: 30 m^{3}/s (1,100 cu ft/s)
  - maximum: 5,000 m^{3}/s (180,000 cu ft/s)
- Discharge
  - location: Yola, Jimeta
  - average: 741 m^{3}/s (26,200 cu ft/s)
  - minimum: 20 m^{3}/s (710 cu ft/s)
  - maximum: 4,200 m^{3}/s (150,000 cu ft/s)
- Discharge
  - location: Garoua
  - average: 360 m^{3}/s (13,000 cu ft/s) (Note: Multiannual average: 360 m³/s (1930–1981), 451.85 m³/s (1930–1995))
  - minimum: 0.4 m^{3}/s (14 cu ft/s)
  - maximum: 3,100 m^{3}/s (110,000 cu ft/s)

Basin features
- Progression: Niger→Gulf of Guinea
- River system: Niger River
- Tributaries
  - left: Mayo Farda, Faro, Ini, Belwa, Fan, Taraba, Donga, Katsina-Ala, Gwer
  - right: Mayo Oldiri, Mayo Rey, Mayo Godi, Mayo-Kébi, Mayo Tiel, Kilunga, Gongola, Pai, Duchi, Wase, Shemanker, Ankwe, Guma, Mada, Okwa

Benue River (French: la Bénoué), previously known as the Chadda River or Tchadda, is the major tributary of the Niger River and also is the second-longest river in Nigeria. The size of its catchment basin is 319,000 km^{2} (123,000 mi^{2}). Almost its entire length of approximately 1,400 km (870 mi) is navigable during the summer months. As a result, it is an important transportation route in the regions through which it flows. The name Benue comes from bernor, meaning 'river or lake of hippos’ in the Tiv.

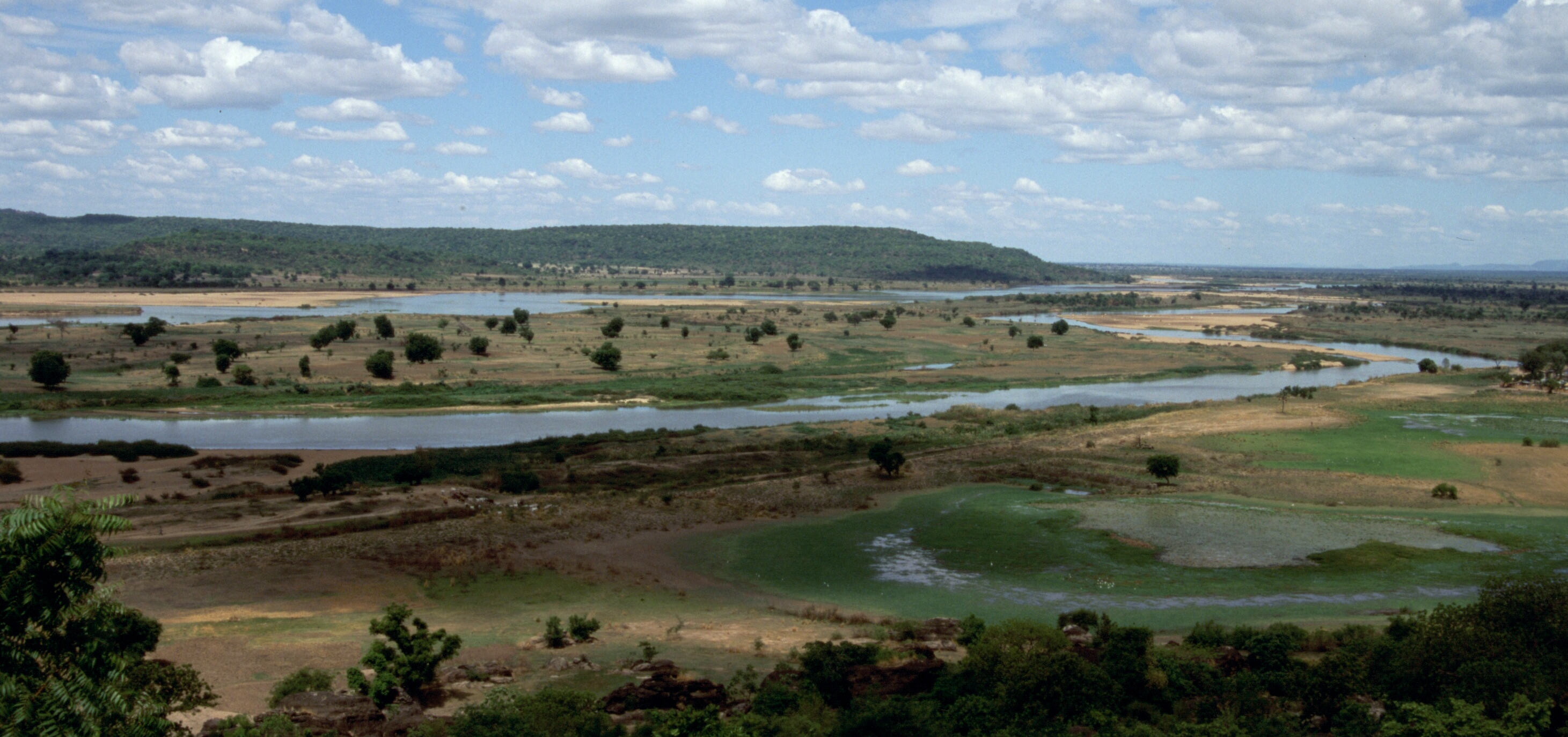
The River Benue looking south east from Jimeta.

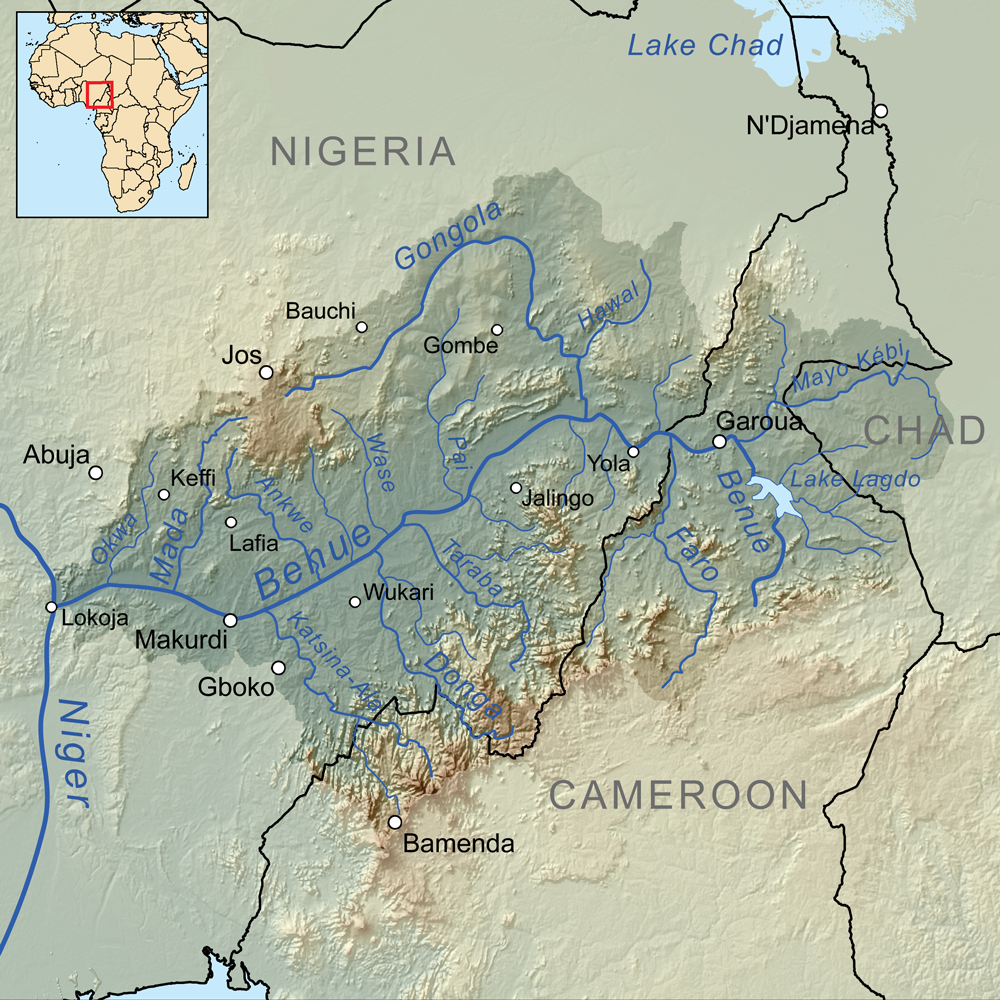
Map showing the Benue River drainage basin.

== Geography ==
The Benue rises in the Adamawa Plateau of northern Cameroon, from where it flows west, and through the town of Garoua and Lagdo Reservoir, into Nigeria south of the Mandara mountains, and through Jimeta, Ibi and Makurdi before meeting the Niger River at Lokoja.

Large tributaries are the Faro, the Gongola and the Mayo Kébbi, which connects it with the Logone (part of the Lake Chad system) during floods. Other tributaries include Taraba, Donga and Katsina Ala.

At the point of confluence, the Benue exceeds the Niger by volume. The mean discharge before 1960 was 3,400 m^{3}/s (120,000 cu ft/s) for the Benue and 3,000 m^{3}/s (110,000 cu ft/s) for the Niger.

== Climate ==
Benue State has a tropical savanna climate. It is warm every month of the year throughout both wet and dry seasons. The annual temperature is 34 °C. The state has an average humidity of 61%, dew point of 25 °C, an UV-index of 7 and it is mainly dry for 169 days in a year.

== Major floods ==
Nigeria’s National Emergency Management Agency (NEMA), conducted a “disaster risk management analysis” and advised Ministries, Departments, and Agencies (MDAs) to take proactive steps to mitigate the impact of climate change. The agency advised that water bodies across some states be desilted and dredged regularly to make water available for various purposes. The agency urged relevant institutions to carry out routine monitoring of dams and water bodies to ensure their operation rule curve for reservoirs is adhered to.

=== 2022 Flood ===
On September 23, 2022, flooding affected all riverine local government areas of Benue, according to the state Commissioner for Water Resources and Environment, Godwin Oyiwona. The flooding affected Makurdi, Agatu, Logo, Guma, Buruku, Otukpo, and Gwer-West. The government worked to mitigate flooding effects and released funds for cleaning the Idye Basin.

In October 2022, farmers in Adamawa State struggled to clear off remnants of crops destroyed by the flooding. The disaster disrupted many communities across Nigeria’s 36 states, with hundreds of villages and urban centers submerged in water. The disaster unsettled over 2.4 million people and over 600 fatalities were recorded. Additionally, "expansive hectares of farmlands across affected states were swept off."

The worst hit were mostly residents of agrarian communities near major tributaries in seven of the 21 local government areas in the state. Within three months, 12 Local Government Areas (LGAs) were submerged, affecting 82,730 residents, 13,788 households, 51 people injured, and 27 deaths. Farmlands worth billions of naira were destroyed.

==== January 2020 ====
President Muhammadu Buhari inaugurated a 3.35-km drainage channel project in Makurdi, Benue, to address ecological challenges in the Idye Community. The project, part of the 17 ecological intervention projects, was approved by the President in the fourth quarter of 2017 and completed in 48 weeks. The project aimed to address the devastating effects of erosion and flood in the region.

=== 2017 Flood ===
News Agency of Nigeria (NAN) reported that Idye Community was among the worst-hit areas of the 2017 flood that displaced over 120,000 persons in the Benue capital, Makurdi. Floods devastated more than 200 households in Makurdi.

=== 2012 Flood ===
The Benue River flooded in October 2012, resulting in a large increase in the population of venomous snakes in the Duguri District, Alkaleri Local Government Area, Bauchi State. A July 2013 report indicated that over 200 people in the district had died of snakebite. The General Hospital in Kaltungo, Gombe State in Nigeria, is the nearest location for treatment of snakebite; "whoever is lucky to make it to Kaltungo is treated in only two days and then they return home."

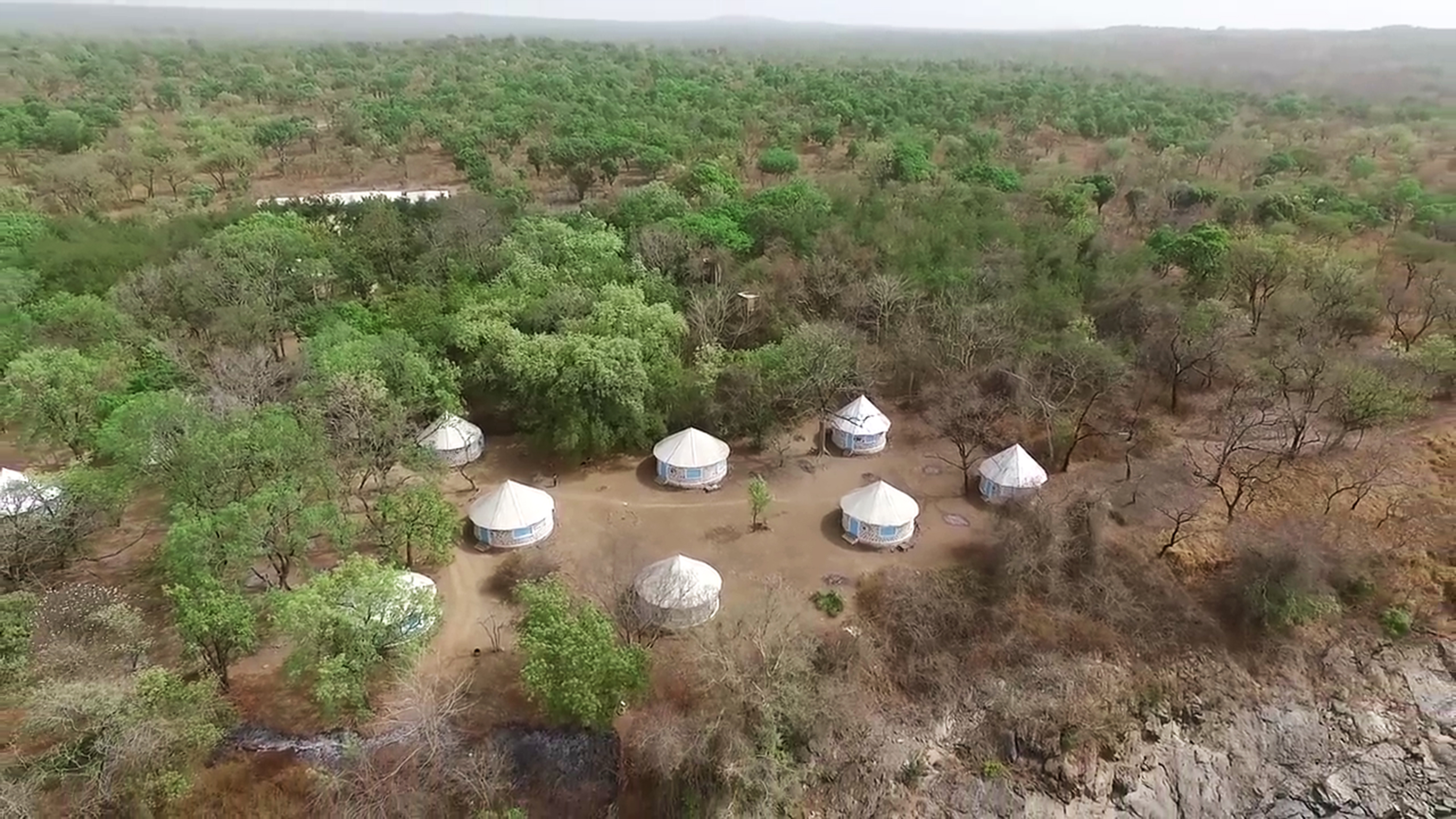
Benoue huts

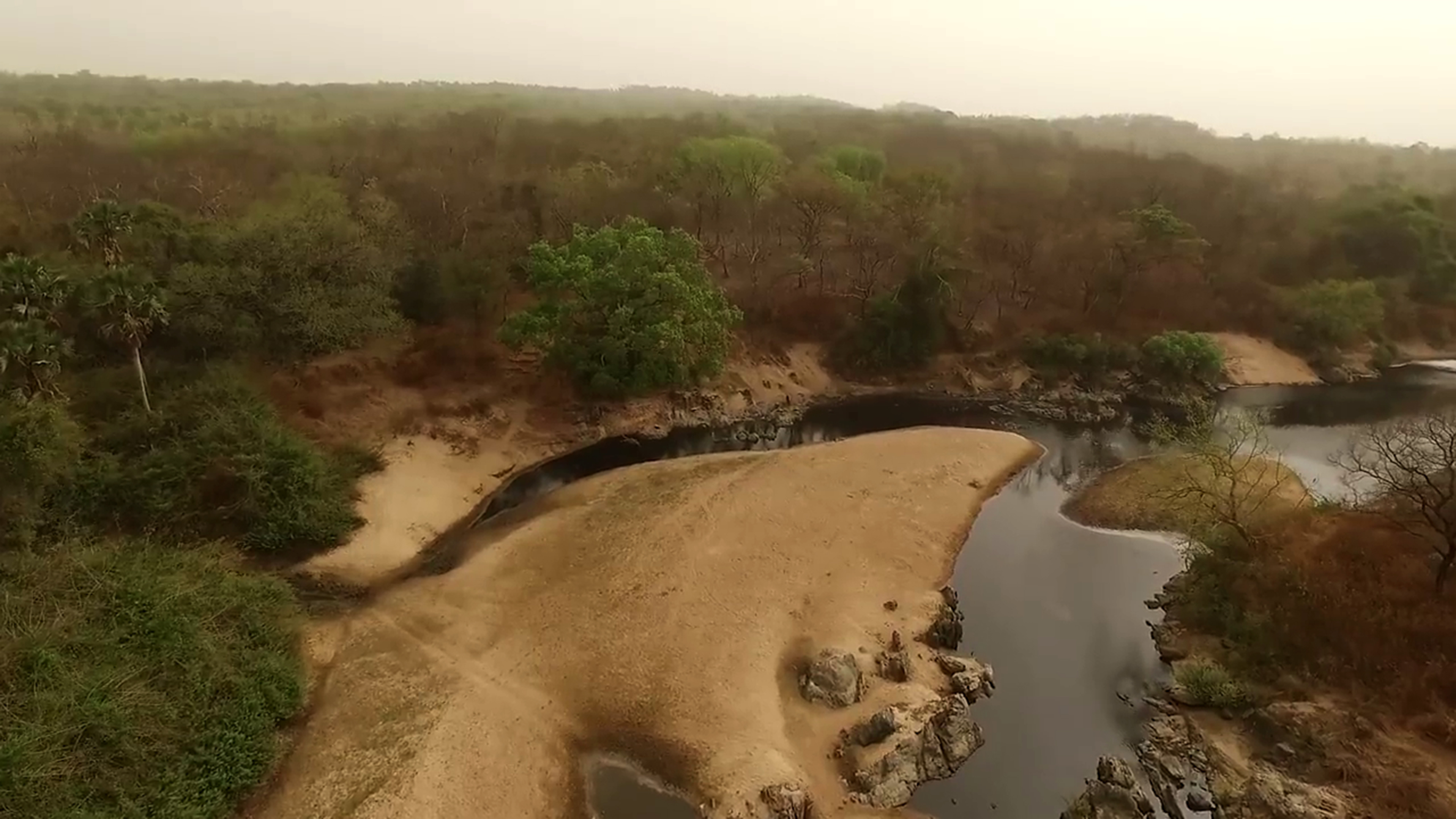
Benoue view from drone

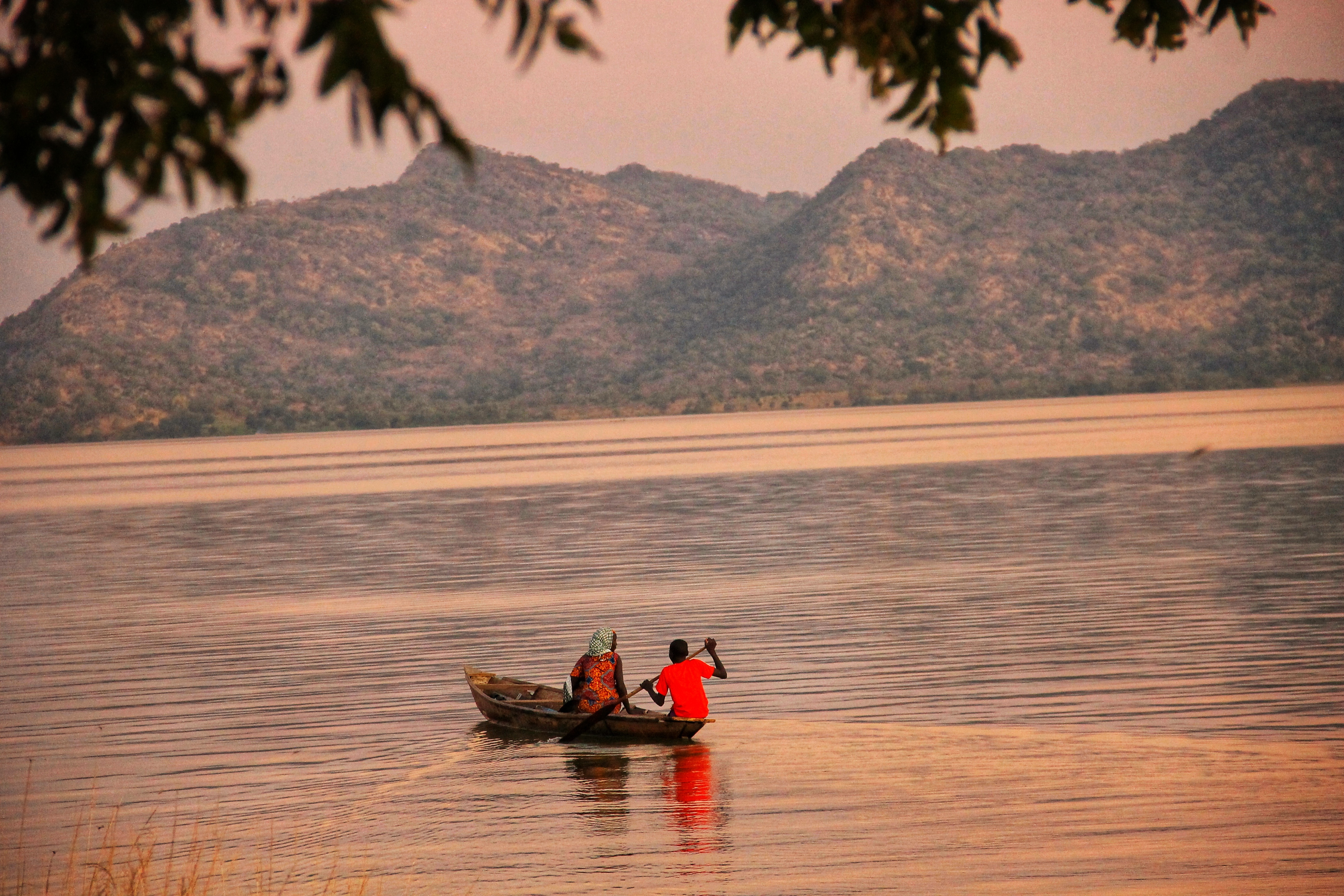
Crossing the Benue River from Lagdo with a Canoe

== Pollution ==
Benue Hike Tourism and Conservation Foundation, in an attempt to keep the river protected from various forms of pollution, informed the Benue State Government about the irregularities of some companies in the state for emptying waste in the river. Waste like ethanol, that could easily cause damage to human and aquatic life, was dumped into Benue River. Subsequently, the Benue State Government took an immediate attempt in addressing the issue to prevent further damages for its citizenry.
