= Ameh Ebute =

Nigerian lawyer and politician (born 1946)

6th President of the Nigerian Senate
- In office November 1993 – 17 November 1993
- Preceded by: Iyorchia Ayu
- Succeeded by: Evan Enwerem (1999)

Senator for Benue South
- In office 5 December 1992 – 17 November 1993
- Succeeded by: David Mark (1999)

Personal details
- Born: 16 May 1946 (age 79) Benue, Northern Region, British Nigeria (now Benue State, Nigeria)
- Party: SDP

Ameh Ebute (born 16 May 1946) is a Nigerian lawyer and politician who served as the 6th President of the Nigerian Senate during the end of the Third Republic.
