= Nyifon language =

Jukunoid language of Benue State, Nigeria

Nyifon
- Iordaa
- Native to: Nigeria
- Region: Buruku LGA, Benue State
- Native speakers: (1,000 cited 1990s)
- Language family: Niger–Congo?: Atlantic–Congo; Benue–Congo; Jukunoid; Nyifon

Language codes
- ISO 639-3: –
- Glottolog: nyif1234

Nyifon (Iordaa) is a poorly known Jukunoid language of Buruku LGA, Benue State, Nigeria. There may have been about 1,000 speakers in the 1990s. The language is not reported in Ethnologue. Glottolog lists it as a dialect of Wapan language.
