= Katsina Ala River =

River in Nigeria

Coordinates: 7.7992°N 8.8756°E

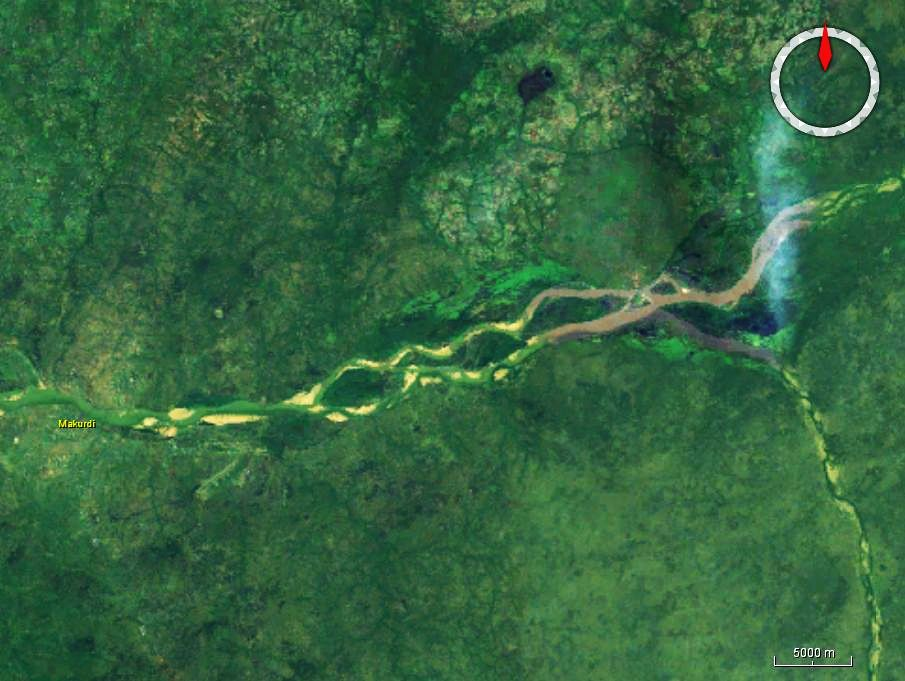
Mouth of the Katsina Ala in the Benue

The Katsina Ala (or Katsina-Ala) is a river in central Nigeria, located within its Middle Belt. It serves as a major tributary of the Benue River in Nigeria. The source of the river is found in the Bamenda highlands in northwestern Cameroon. It flows 320 kilometres (200 mi) northwest in Cameroon, crossing the Nigeria–Cameroon border into Nigeria.

The Katsina Ala river flows in Benue State. While Katsina-Ala community has an area of 2,402 km^{2} with a population of about 224,718 at the 2006 national census, a significant tributary of the Benue River and are environment-delicate regions that are generally powerless against climate change in Benue State. Decreased rainfall, evaporating of the river and other surface water bodies, flooding, disintegration, irritation and infection invasion and land.

== Location ==
The River Katsina Ala is found mainly in Benue State of Nigeria, after crossing the border between Nigeria and Cameroon, before emptying its contents into the Benue River. Its lies between longitude 9° 15′ and 9° 56′ East and Latitude 6° 55′ and 7° 36′ North

== Towns ==
Katsina-Ala is the capital and major town of Katsina Ala local government in Benue State, Nigeria. It is found along the course of river Katsina Ala with numerous hamlets and villages along the road. It has a central market that holds every Thursdays of the week.

== Pollution ==
The River Katsina-ala is slightly polluted; heavy metal content from abattoir effluents upset the physicochemical balance of the river; bioaccumulation and bio-magnification of heavy metals may result from prolonged use of the river water for drinking; and it is recommended that the abattoir effluent be treated before discharge into the river to reduce environmental and health risks.
