= Zaki Biam Yam Market =

Open air yam market in Nigeria

Zaki Biam Yam Market is the largest yam market in the world. It is an open-air market located in Zaki Biam, a town in the Ukum Local Government Area of Benue State, Nigeria. The market specializes in selling and distributing yams, a staple crop in the region. It is a significant hub for yam trading, attracting buyers and sellers from various parts of Nigeria and neighboring countries.

Zaki Biam Yam Market is the largest mono-product market in Nigeria.

The market attracts buyers and sellers from various regions of the Nigeria and even neighboring countries. Buyers from as far as Cameroon, Niger, and Ghana patronize the market. About 200 truckloads of yams depart the market every day and yams are never completely bought.

In June 2020 the Federal Government of Nigeria inaugurated a storage facility in the market to serve as an industrial hub for neighboring yam-producing states like Nasarawa and Taraba. The facility also consists of 660 units of reconstructed stalls/sheds, internal roads, administrative buildings and a solar-powered borehole.

Nigeria is the principal contributor to yam production, boasting an annual 17 million tonnes, constituting a substantial 70-76% share of the worldwide output. The majority of these tubers, amounting to approximately two million weekly, traverse through the Zaki Biam Yam Market, signifying a pivotal hub in the distribution network.
