= Utonkon =

Utonkon Utɔnkɔn Ufia, Atonkon
- Village
- Location within Nigeria
- Coordinates: 06°56′51″N 08°2′5″E
- Country: Nigeria
- State: Benue State
- LGA: Ado

Government
  - Type: Democracy

Area
  - Total: 0.409 km^{2} (0.158 sq mi)
- Elevation: 146.02 m (479.1 ft)

Population (2015)
  - Total: 41,111
  - Density: 101,000/km^{2} (260,000/sq mi)
- Time zone: UTC+01:00 (WAT)
- Postal code: 973110
- Climate: Aw

Utonkon is a district and a village in Ado Local Government Area, Benue State , Nigeria. It has a postal code of 973110.

== History ==
The Orring language is one of the characteristics of the Ufia people. These people extend to other communities like Ogbala, Okpoto, etc. They are also part of the Kwararafa confederation. Driven by factors such as conflicts and land disputes among themselves, and pressures from invaders, the Ufia people's migration ultimately resulted in their settlement in present-day Benue, Taraba, and surrounding regions. In accordance with background information, the people of Utonkon (Ufia people) and the Ukelle people in Yala Local Government Area of Cross Rivers State have a connection considering they speak the same dialect of Ufia. Also, the last settlement of the Ufia people before migrating to their current location in Ado LGA in Benue State was Ebonyi State. They continue to honour their past while showcasing their resilience and commitment to cultural preservation.

=== Historical ties between Ufia and Idoma communities ===
Ongoing debates have ensued concerning differences between the Ufia people and the Idoma people living close to each other. These discussions stem from historical migrations and settlements among these groups, which have led to questions about their shared identity and cultural heritage.

Based on language genealogy and according to the quote of an American author, Dr Samuel Johnson on language, which states, "there is no taking the connection of ancient nations, but by language", it logically follows that the Ufia people are indeed part of the Idoma group, given that the Idoma are a distinct people. The reason is because, they both have a history that can be attributed to the ancient Kwararafa Confederacy which included the Jukun and other groups and also the Akpoto ethnic group whose disintegration resulted from some factors such as conflicts, land disputes, and pressures from invaders.

== Geography ==
=== Nearby Settlements ===
Some settlements near Utonkon with their approximate distances include:

1. Onyue (9.4 km [5.8 mi])
2. Amufu (14 km [8.7 mi])
3. Egbella (15 km [9.3 mi])
4. Po (17 km [11 mi])
5. Igumale (18 km [11 mi])
6. Ojeba (18 km [11 mi])
7. Adum West (19 km [12 mi])
8. Obotu (19 km [12 mi])
9. Otobi (19 km [12 mi])
10. Okpaele (21 km [13 mi])

=== Climate ===
Utonkon has a land area of 0.409 km^{2} and is located at an elevation of 146.02 metres (479.07 feet) above sea level with a tropical wet and dry or savanna climate (Classification: Aw). The district's yearly temperature is 31.21 °C (88.18 °F) and it is 1.75% higher than Nigeria's average. Utonkon typically receives about 143.6 millimeters (5.65 inches) of precipitation and has 169.95 rainy days (46.56% of the time) annually.

== Demographics ==
The Korring speaking people make up the larger population in Utonkon. The Korring coexist with the Idoma people within the same region.

=== Language and dialect ===
The Ufia people speak a sub-Bantu language called K'ufia, a dialect of the Korring ethnic group. They are found in Benue and Taraba States. Despite modernisation's impact on language use, interventions are provided through local initiatives and cultural projects to preserve K'ufia because the language needs to survive for the people's cultural heritage to be maintained for its continuity in future generations.

== Traditions and cultural practices ==
The eldest member of the community of the Ufia people takes the leadership responsibilities by guiding his people in maintaining oneness in the society. With his help, cultural activities are supervised through storytelling, singing, or music. He is known to be the "Okpako Orere" of his people, and all his aim is to pass down their history, morals, and craftsmanship from generation to generation. Many members of the community keep their cultural legacy alive by practicing various traditional crafts. For example, a craft centre exists in the Utonkon community called Peter Attah Crafts, where different artworks and designs are carried out for diverse purposes.

=== Festivals and celebrations ===
As found in many other ethnic groups, Ufia people also have festivals that they celebrate, especially the New Yam Festival (Richi festival). Richi is celebrated for bringing the community together in a communal feasting concerning a bountiful yam harvest. There used to be performances of prayers, rituals, music, and dance. There is also the Jokah Festival, one showcasing the yam harvest through vibrant masquerades, energetic dancing, and lively singing that fosters joy and unity among the people. These festivals educate the younger generations towards their traditions and participation in cultural activities, ensuring the continuity of Ufia traditions.

=== Marriage customs ===
In Ufia society, marriage is a revered institution that unites individuals, families, and communities. It is seen as a communal affair, emphasizing unity, mutual support, and the importance of extended family ties. The process involves a formal proposal with symbolic gifts, followed by elaborate ceremonies.

== Cuisine ==
Food is woven into Ufia culture, reflecting their agricultural history. Their staple foods are yam, cassava, and maize, with yam being the favorite. A yam pepper soup called "ukodo' is relished during communal gatherings, manifesting the spirit of unity and hospitality. Food fosters togetherness through joyous and meaningful jubilation.

== Security ==
=== Insecurity concerns (2024) ===
In 2024, Utonkon, a community in Ado Local Government Area, experienced heightened security concerns due to various forms of violence. This tore apart the harmonious coexistence among the Ufia people and other occupants, causing widespread panic. Residents struggled to tend to their farms, constantly fearing what might happen next due to rampant criminal activities.

==== Intervention and resolution ====
Fortunately, security operatives intervened promptly and successfully restored order. To prevent further insecurity, it is expected that stakeholders, government authorities, community leaders, and citizens will work together to resolve the issue.

== See also ==
- List of villages in Benue State
