= Katsina-Ala =

- City and LGA
- Interactive map of Katsina-Ala
- Location within Nigeria
- Coordinates: 7°10′0″N 9°17′0″E
- Country: Nigeria
- State: Benue State

Government
  - Local Government Chairman and the Head of the Local Government Council: Hon. Orangoholga Justine Shaku

Area
  - Total: 2,402 km^{2} (927 sq mi)

Population (2006)
  - Total: 224,718
  - Density: 93.55/km^{2} (242.3/sq mi)
- Time zone: UTC+1 (WAT)

Katsina-Ala is a city and local government area (LGA) of Benue State, Nigeria where the A344 highway starts. It is also the location of an important archeological site where artifacts of the Nok culture have been found.

Some major markets in Katsina Ala Local Government Area includes the Tomanyiin (held on Thursdays), The Tor Donga market (held on Mondays), the Gbor Tongov market (held on Fridays), the Abaji market (held on Wednesdays), the Amaafu market (held on Tuesdays) and many other smaller markets.

== Community ==
The LGA of Katsina-Ala has an area of 2,402 km^{2} (927 sq mi) and a population of 224,718 at the 2006 census. The town center is the location of one of the oldest schools in Nigeria, Government College Katsina-Ala, founded in 1914, and has produced many prominent members in Nigerian society. The postal code of the area is 980. The community, which lies on the banks of the Katsina Ala River, a major tributary of the Benue River, is mainly occupied by Etulo, Tiv, Hausas and fulanis. The major language of communication in Katsina Ala is Tiv

== Archeological site ==
Terracotta statues were found at Katsina Ala in the middle of the twentieth century. They include realistic representations of human heads, with some animals, and parts of larger statues. The statues are similar to others found at Nok, about 209 km to the north, and are thought to have been made by people of the same culture. The human figures most likely represented ancestors or spirits. According to Bernard Fagg, an archeologist who undertook extensive studies into the Nok culture, the works at Katsina Ala constitutes a distinctive sub-style. Statues from Taruga and from Samun Dukiya are similar, but have typical stylistic differences.

Iron working began at the site in the fourth century BC, somewhat later than iron working at Taruga. Smelted tin beads have also been found on the site, some of which could be imitations of cowrie shells.

== Climate ==
The tropical climate of Katsina-Ala, Nigeria, is marked by high temperatures and significant seasonal rainfall. The rainy season, which runs from May to September, delivers heavy precipitation, up to 235 mm (9.3 in) in the month of September, whereas January through March has high average temperatures that peak at 31 °C (88 °F) with little rainfall. November and December are colder months with average highs of about 28 °C (82 °F) and less rainfall.
