= Oju, Benue State =

Local government area of Benue, Nigeria

Oju
- Town and LGA
- Interactive map of Oju
- Location within Nigeria
- Coordinates: 06°51′00″N 08°25′00″E
- Country: Nigeria
- State: Benue
- Created: February, 1976

Government
  - Chairman: Hon. Ire Arubi

Area
  - Total: 1,168 km^{2} (451 sq mi)
- Elevation: 163 m (535 ft)

Population (2022)
  - Total: 243,300
  - Density: 208.3/km^{2} (539.5/sq mi)

Language
  - Native: Igede
- Time zone: UTC+1 (WAT)
- Postal code: 971107

Oju is a town and local government area in Benue State, Nigeria. It borders Obi and Gwer East in the north, Konshisha and Yala in the east, Izzi and Ebonyi State in the south, and Ado in the west. As of 2022, its total population is 243,300.

== Geography ==
Oju is located on the southern edge of Benue State. The Oju-Alebo Road passes through the north of the area. Its average elevation is 163 metres or 535 feet above the sea level.

=== Climate ===
Oju has a Tropical Savanna Climate (Aw). Over the course of the year, the temperature usually varies from 17 °C (63 °F) to 32 °C (89 °F) and is seldom below 14 °C (57 °F) or above 34 °C (93 °F).

The rainy season of Oju starts in late March and ends in early November. It sees the most precipitation in September, with an average rainfall of 209 mm (8.2 in); and the least precipitation in December, with an average rainfall of 2 mm (0.079 in).

Climate data for Oju
Month	Jan	Feb	Mar	Apr	May	Jun	Jul	Aug	Sep	Oct	Nov	Dec	Year
Mean daily maximum °C (°F)	30 (86)	31 (88)	32 (90)	31 (88)	30 (86)	29 (84)	28 (82)	28 (82)	28 (82)	28 (82)	29 (84)	29 (84)	29 (85)
Daily mean °C (°F)	24 (75)	26 (79)	27 (81)	27 (81)	26 (79)	25 (77)	24 (75)	24 (75)	25 (77)	25 (77)	25 (77)	23 (73)	25 (77)
Mean daily minimum °C (°F)	18 (64)	20 (68)	23 (73)	23 (73)	23 (73)	23 (73)	22 (72)	22 (72)	22 (72)	22 (72)	21 (70)	18 (64)	21 (71)
Average rainfall mm (inches)	2.5 (0.10)	9.7 (0.38)	42.8 (1.69)	92.9 (3.66)	132.9 (5.23)	163.5 (6.44)	178.6 (7.03)	192.6 (7.58)	209.0 (8.23)	164.1 (6.46)	41.0 (1.61)	2.0 (0.08)	1,231.6 (48.49)
Average rainy days (≥ 1 mm)	0.7	2.2	9.8	16.4	20.6	21.3	21.4	22.4	23.6	21.7	6.3	0.6	167
Mean daily daylight hours	11.8	11.9	12.1	12.3	12.4	12.5	12.5	12.3	12.1	12.0	11.8	11.7	12.1
Source: Weatherspark.com

== Administrative divisions ==
Oju is divided into the following 11 council wards:

- Ainu
- Adokpa
- Ibilla
- Idelle
- Iyeche
- Oboru Oye
- Oju
- Okpokpo
- Okudu
- Owo
- Ukpa

== Minerals ==
Oju Local Government Area has proven reserves of solid minerals like:

- Limestone
- Precious stone
- Bauxite
- Coal
- Clay
- Zinc
- Salt

== Agricultural produce ==
The land is very fertile and about 80% of the inhabitants are farmers. Its rich and diverse agricultural endowment include: yam, rice, beniseed, guinea corn, oil palm, soyabeans, cassava, millet, maize, groundnut, and palm oil.

The economy is dependent on agriculture (food and cash crops) produced in commercial quantity.

The people of Oju are also involved in: Livestock keeping, Fishing, and Hunting

== Religion ==
Basically, there are two religions in Oju Local Government Area. The predominant Christianity on one hand and the traditional African religion on the other. The people of Oju are about eighty-five per cent (85%) Christians and about fifteen (15%) traditional worshipers.

== Markets in Oju ==
Oju currently has five market days, namely:

- Ihigile
- Ihio
- Ihiobila
- Ihiejwo
- Ihiokwu
