= Ukum =

- LGA
- Interactive map of Ukum
- Country: Nigeria
- State: Benue State
- Local Government Headquarters: Sankera

Government
  - Local Government Chairman and the Head of the Local Government Council: Jonathan Modi

Area
  - Total: 1,514 km^{2} (585 sq mi)

Population (2006)
  - Total: 216,930
  - Density: 143.3/km^{2} (371.1/sq mi)
- Time zone: UTC+1 (WAT)
- Postal Code: 980

Ukum is a Local Government Area of Benue State, Nigeria. with Sankera as its headquarters. It has an area of 1,514 square kilometres (585 sq mi) and a population of 216,930 at the 2006 census. The biggest yam market in the world, Zaki Biam Yam Market, is located in Ukum, and Zaki Biam is also the biggest town in the local government. The federal government of Nigeria awarded contract to build the Zaki Biam Power Sub-station in 2021 located in Ukum.

The postal code of the area is 980.

== Climate condition ==
The weather condition of Ukum is divided into Rainy and dry season of which the rainy season usually starts from March through October, and the dry season usually starts between ending October and mid March. Ukum is located between Latitude: 7°38'38" N; Longitude: 9°33'49" E.
