= Etulo language =

Volta–Niger language of Nigeria

Etulo
- Native to: Nigeria
- Region: Benue State, Taraba State
- Native speakers: (10,000 cited 1988)
- Language family: Niger–Congo?: Atlantic–Congo; Volta–Niger; noi; Idomoid; Etulo–Idoma; Etulo

Language codes
- ISO 639-3: utr
- Glottolog: etul1245

Etulo (Utur, Turumawa) is an Idomoid language of central Nigeria.

Etulo is a tonal language. Word order is SVO.

== Distribution ==
Etulo is spoken in:

- Buruku LGA, Benue State
- Katsina-Ala LGA, Benue State
- Wukari LGA, Taraba State

== Demographics ==
Etulo speakers belong to 14 different clans.

Clans in Buruku LGA are:

- Agbatala
- Oglazi
- Agbɔ
- Ugiɛ
- Agia
- Ogbulube
- Oʃafu
- Okpaʃila
- Ingwaʤɛ

Clans in Katsina Ala LGA are:

- Otsazi
- Otanga
- Okadiɲa
- ʃɛwɛ
- Aʃitanakwu

There are also Etulo speakers in Wukari LGA, Taraba State.

Speaker estimates range from 10,000–100,000 speakers. Most Etulo speakers are also fluent speakers of Tiv, which is a local lingua franca.

== Resources ==
- Audio Recording 1: A story of the king, the hare and other animals (Text 1) and What I did yesterday (Text 3). Featuring Mr. Ingyu Clement Agyo and Mr. Moro Akanya. hdl:20.500.12434/fd138194
- Audio Recording 2: How we plant yams (Text 2) and What I do everyday (Text 4). Featuring Mr. Ingyu Clement Agyo and Mr. Moro Akanya. hdl:20.500.12434/af886b51
