= Ado, Benue State =

Ado
- LGA
- Interactive map of Ado
- Coordinates: 6°47′58″N 8°00′19″E
- Country: Nigeria
- State: Benue State
- Headquarters: Igumale

Government
  - Local Government Chairman and the Head of the Local Government Council: Sunday Oche

Area
  - Total: 991.9 km^{2} (383.0 sq mi)

Population (2022)
  - Total: 266,200
  - Density: 268.4/km^{2} (695.1/sq mi)
- Time zone: UTC+1 (WAT)

Ado is a Local Government Area of Benue State, in the Middle Belt region of Nigeria and was created in 1989. It is one of the 9 Local Government Areas in the southern senatorial zone of Benue State bordered by Cross River State to the south and Ebonyi State to the southeast.

== History and culture ==
=== Early contact with the Europeans ===
The area was one of the earliest in Idoma to have interactions with European missionaries. Hence it had the first missionary school in the Idoma area (Methodist High School, Igumale). The Catholic Missionaries first came to Utonkon in Ado in 1922 where they established the St. Paul's Catholic Church (Parish) in Utonkon. The creation of Ado happened during the 1976 Local Government reforms in Nigeria.

=== Cultural diversity ===
It is a culturally rich and diverse area comprising various communities, including:

- Agila/Apa
- Akoge/Ogbilolo
- Allan
- Apa-Agila
- Ekile
- Igumale
- Igumale I
- Igumale II
- Ijigban
- Ogege
- Ojeba
- Ojigo
- Royongo
- Ukwonyo
- Ulayi
- Utonkon

== Demographics and Geography ==
=== Occupants ===
It is primarily occupied by the Idoma and the Igede people of Benue State and the Igbo people.

=== Administrative headquarters ===
The administrative headquarters are at Igumale, situated on the railway line traversing the north-south of Nigeria.

=== Districts ===
Districts under the Ado Local Government Area of Benue State are five in number. They are:

1. Agila
2. Atonkon (Utonkon)
3. Igumale
4. Ijigban
5. Ulayi

== Economy ==
=== Agricultural production ===
Yam Production: Ado is a major producer of yams.

Rice Production: Rice is another significant crop grown in the area.

Cassava Production: Cassava is cultivated widely for food and income.

Maize Production: Maize promotes local food security and economy.

Palm Oil Production: Palm oil is produced in large quantities.

There is also the existence of livestock rearing with fishing as a major occupation because of the water resources found in the area.

=== Supporting Industries ===
Blacksmith Industry: Produces essential farm tools, including:

- Hoes
- Cutlasses
- Other basic farm implements

== Economic and educational impact ==
The agricultural sector of this area contributes significantly to the local economy and food security in Benue State. Igumale in Ado is the location of the Benue State cement factory while Utonkon is the location of the defunct Apa State University.

== Natural resources ==
=== Mineral resources ===
The area contains minerals in commercial quantities such as:

- Limestone
- Kaolin
- Petroleum
- Coal.

=== Water Resources ===
Streams: Several streams support fishing and other activities, including:

- Okpokwu stream
- Ogege stream
- Awu stream
- Atsani stream
- Ado stream

== Notable places ==
1. Methodist High School, Igumale.
2. St. Paul's Catholic Church:Established in Utonkon in 1922.

== Notable people ==
- HRH, Late Amb. Dr Edwin Ogebe Ogbu, the Ochi'doma III of Idoma.
- Hon. (Chief) Dennis Ekpe Ogbu, The Ogakwu K'Idoma.
- Justice George I. Uloko (Rtd), a former Chief Commissioner, Public Complaints Commission, Nigeria.

== See also ==
- List of villages in Benue State
- Utonkon
