= Igede language =

Language of Nigeria

Igede
- Native to: Central Nigeria
- Region: Benue State
- Ethnicity: Igede
- Native speakers: 461,000 (2020)
- Language family: Niger–Congo?: Atlantic–Congo; Volta–Niger; noi; Igede

Language codes
- ISO 639-3: ige
- Glottolog: iged1239

Igede is a language spoken in Lower Benue State and Cross River State, Nigeria, by 461,000 people. Igede is a tripartite referring as well to the "people" and the "Igede land" that is occupied by the Igede people.
