= David Mark =

Nigerian politician and military officer (born 1948)

The Right Honourable Brigadier General David Mark GCON
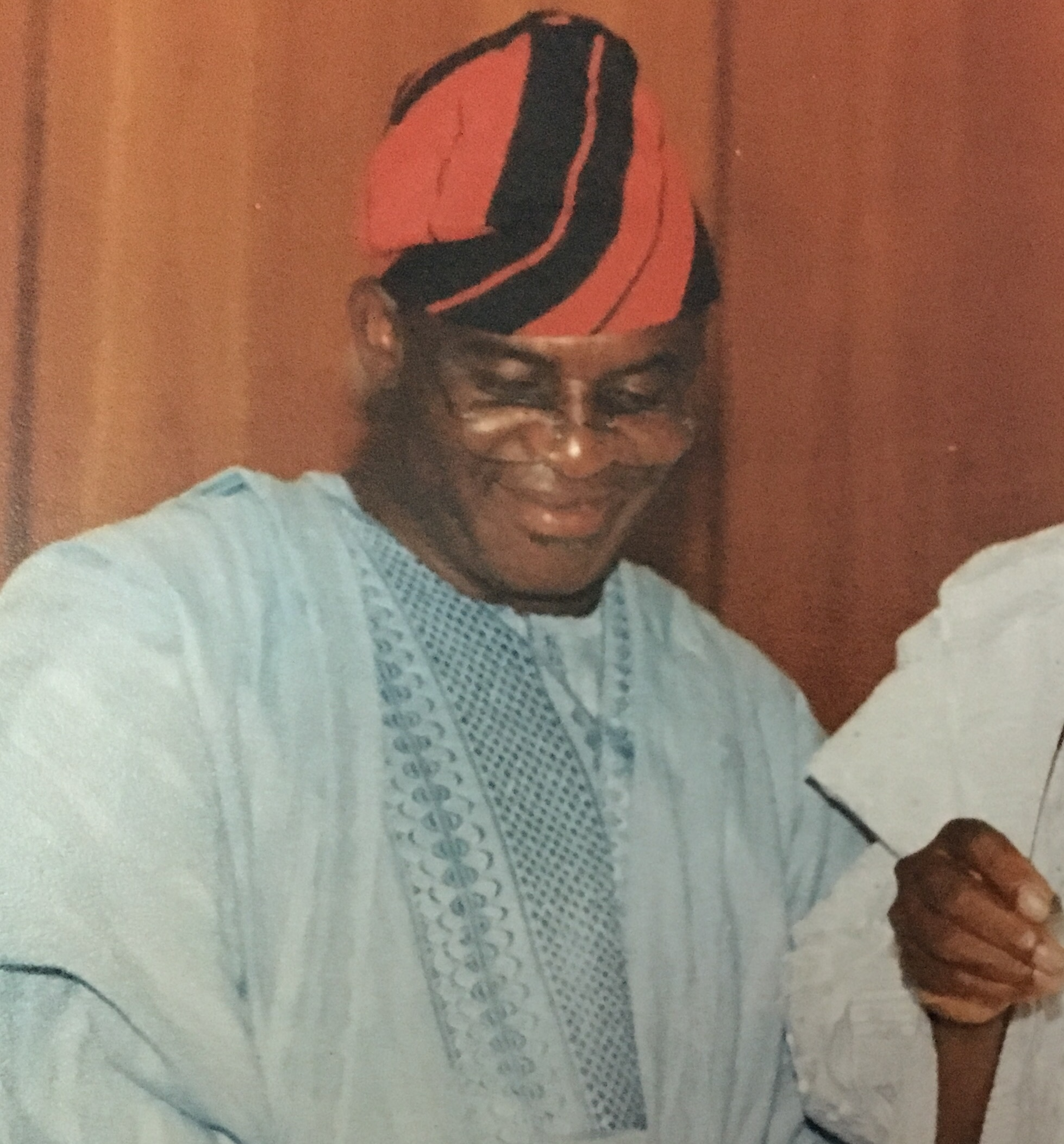

12th President of the Nigerian Senate
- In office 5 June 2007 – 6 June 2015
- Deputy: Ike Ekweremadu
- Preceded by: Ken Nnamani
- Succeeded by: Bukola Saraki

Senator for Benue South
- In office 3 June 1999 – 9 June 2019
- Preceded by: Ameh Ebute (1993)
- Succeeded by: Abba Moro

Governor of Niger State
- In office January 1984 – 1986
- Preceded by: Awwal Ibrahim
- Succeeded by: Garba Ali Mohammed

Personal details
- Born: 8 April 1948 (age 78) Otukpo, Northern Region, British Nigeria (now in Benue State, Nigeria)
- Party: African Democratic Congress (since 2025)
- Other political affiliations: Peoples Democratic Party (1998–2025)
- Education: Nigerian Defence Academy
- Occupation: Politician; military officer

Military service
- Allegiance: Nigeria
- Branch/service: Nigerian Army
- Rank: Brigadier General

David Alechenu Bonaventure Mark GCON (born 8 April 1948) is a retired Nigerian army brigadier general and politician. He served as the 12th president of the Nigerian Senate from 2007 to 2015 and was the Senator for Benue South senatorial district from 1999 to 2019. He is a former member of the Peoples Democratic Party (PDP) which he left in 2025 to join the African Democratic Congress (ADC) and become its interim National Chairman. Prior to his senatorial career, Mark was the military Governor of Niger State from 1984 to 1986, and is a one-time minister of communication. He is the longest serving president of the Nigerian Senate.

== Early life and education ==
Mark was born in Otukpo Benue State in April 1948. He attended St. Francis Catholic Practicing School before attending the Nigerian Military School from 1962-1966. After that he attended the Nigerian Defence Academy from 1967-70. He was commissioned as a 2nd Lieutenant in 1970 and became a Captain in 1971. He was Commandant of Static Communications in 1974, then later held a political post as Chairman Abandoned Properties Implementation Committee in the Eastern region in 1976.

== Minister ==
Mark headed the Communications Ministry and its two major parastatals: Nigerian Telecommunications Limited (NITEL) and Nigerian Postal Service (NIPOST). As Minister of Communications, Mark was sometimes known for his blunt talk; during a two-day walking tour of facilities in Akure in 1989, some union workers complained that some of its members had not been promoted since 1978. Mark's response was that those who had not been promoted may have to be retired, meaning that unproductive workers will have to be let go. He also espoused the opinion of death penalty for telecom cable thieves, as well as a policy of dismantling under-utilized telecom facilities citing political considerations for giving allocations to towns with limited use of phone networks.

== Senate of Nigeria ==
Mark was elected to his position as President of the Senate of Nigeria on 6 June 2007.

David Mark ran for re-election to the Senate for Benue South in April 2011 and was elected for a fourth term. David Mark noted that the polls pointed to his decisive victory and called for his opponents to work together to improve Nigeria.

When leading the review of the Nigerian Constitution, Mark reportedly urged his colleagues to set aside their personal interests and focus on the interests of the Nigerian people. After the UK criticized Nigeria's Prohibition of Same-Sex Marriage bill, threatening to pull their foreign aid, Mark responded that they "should keep [their] aid." Mark called Nigeria's National Football Federation the "centre of corruption in the country," suggesting that they may need to temporarily disband to allow for reconstruction.

In September 2018, making plans to contest for the Nigerian presidency, Mark appointed Zainab Abdulkadir Kure as his campaign manager and Abba Ejembi as campaign's spokesperson.

== Corruption allegation ==
The Panama papers reveal that David Mark has links to at least eight offshore shell companies while holding public office, in violation of the Federal Code of Conduct Law, a massive leak of files belonging to Mossack Fonseca a law firm in Panama.

== Personal life ==
David Mark enjoys golf, tennis, and squash. He is an Idoma by tribe and is married to at least 4 wives.

Mark has a country house with a helicopter and helipad.
