= Gwer West =

Gwer West Tyoshin Nagi
- LGA
- Nickname: Naka
- Interactive map of Gwer West
- Country: Nigeria
- State: Benue State
- Local Government Headquarters: Naka

Government
  - Ter Tyoshin: Chief Abomtse Ayua Daniel
  - Local Government Chairman and the Head of the Local Government Council: Hon. Ormin Torsar Victor

Area
  - Total: 1,094 km^{2} (422 sq mi)

Population (2006)
  - Total: 122,145
  - Density: 111.6/km^{2} (289.2/sq mi)
- Time zone: UTC+1 (WAT)
- Postal code: 971

Gwer West is a Local Government Area of Benue State, Nigeria. Its headquarters are in the town of Naka.

It has an area of 1,094 km^{2} and a population of 122,145 at the 2006 census.

The postal code of the area is 971.

it has fifteen council wards and kindreds; Sengev, Tsambe/Mbesev, Merkyen, Nyamshi, Gaambe-Ushin, Mbachohon, Mbapa, Tijime, Avihijime, Gbaange/Tongov, Tyoughatee/Ijaha, Sengev/Yengev, Saghev/Ukusu, Ikyaghev, Mbabuande. Chief Daniel Ayua Abomtse is the current paramount ruler. the current Chairman is Hon. Ormin Torsar Victor. There are some other important settlements in the local government apart from the headquarters, these include Orawe, Bunaka, Agagbe, Nagi, Aondoana, Kula, Jimba, Anguhar, Atukpu and Ajigba. Ikyande is another popular market in Gwer West Local Government Area.

== Climate condition ==
Gwer West experiences a tropical wet and dry climate with rainfall occurring mainly between April and October. The dry season lasts from November to March, and temperatures typically range from 23 °C (73 °F) to 34 °C (93 °F), while annual precipitation is about 1,200–1,600 mm (47–63 in).
