= Buruku =

- LGA and town
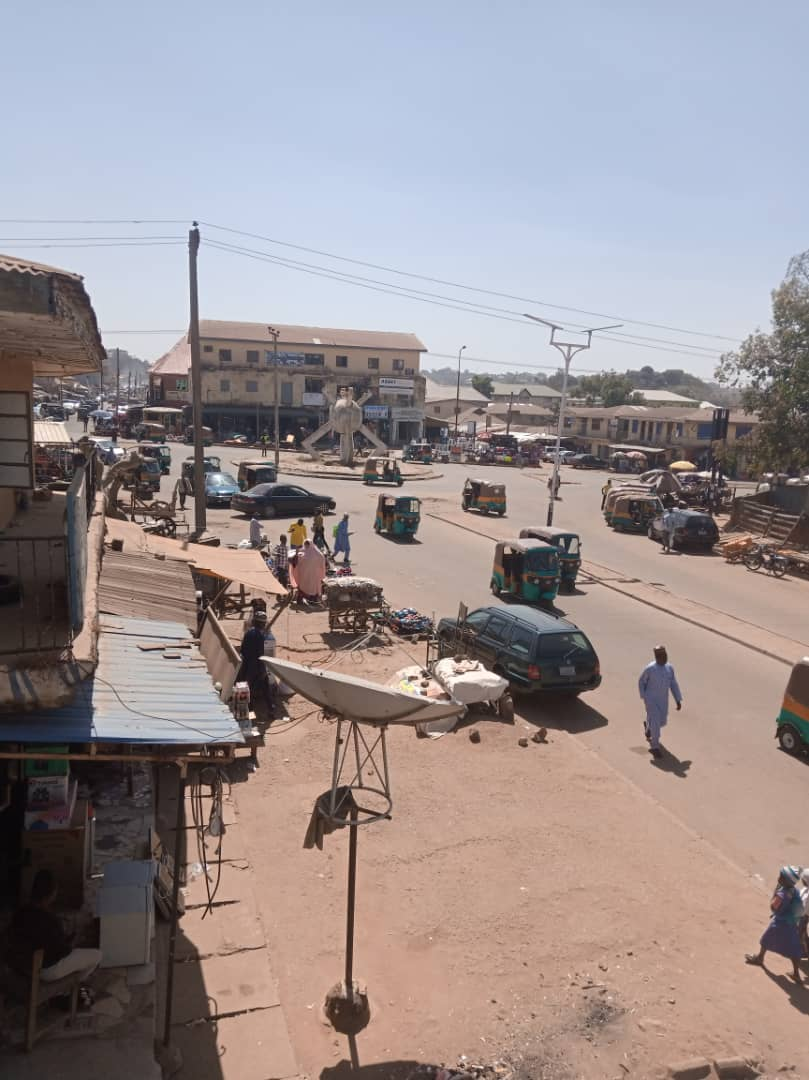
- Old Buruku Park in Jos
- Interactive map of Buruku
- Country: Nigeria
- State: Benue State

Government
  - Local Government Chairwoman and the Head of the Local Government Council: Justina Sorkaa

Area
  - Total: 1,246 km^{2} (481 sq mi)

Population (2006)
  - Total: 203,721
  - Density: 163.5/km^{2} (423.5/sq mi)
- Time zone: UTC+1 (WAT)
- Postal code: 981

Buruku is a town and Local Government Area of Benue State, Nigeria.

== Population ==
It covers an area of 1,246 square kilometres (481 mi^{2}) and has a population of 203,721 according to the 2006 census.

Buruku LGA consists of the following districts (wards) with their projected population as of December 2017:

District	Projected Population
Binev	21,393
Etulo	14,253
Mbaade	14,795
Mbaakura	23,421
Mbaapen	47,646
Mbaatirkya	37,001
Mbaazager	16,114
Mbaikyongo	16,462
Mbakyaan	14,010
Mbatyough	15,294
Mbaya	37,820
Mbayaka	19,518
Shorov	13,891
Total	291,618

== Food production ==
Over 80% of adults in this rural population are engaged in food crop production but each household also holds some livestock and citrus farm. The crop farmers produce yams, cassava, soyabeans, rice, groundnuts, sesame seed (beniseed), beans, guinea corn, millet, bambara nuts, ginger, sugar cane, and maize. Buruku is a riverine local government area with large areas of Katsina-Ala River Basin where sugar cane is planted in commercial quantity.

Rice is also produced in commercial quantities along the River Katsina-Ala basin and its streams/tributaries. Popular local markets in Buruku LGA are Ityowanye, Adi, Abwa, Buruku, Adogo, Kur, Usen, Agwabi, Ortese-Mbashian, Gbanyam, Ugah, Jingir, and Dogo/Wuna. Buruku has a large citrus and soya beans market at Ityowanye.

== Languages ==
Languages spoken in Buruku LGA include Etulo, Tiv, Hausa, among others.

== Climate ==
Buruku lies within the tropical savanna zone with a rainy season lasting from April to October and a dry season dominated by Harmattan winds from December to February. Temperatures generally range from 22 °C (72 °F) to 33 °C (91 °F), and annual rainfall averages 1,200–1,700 mm (47–67 in).
