= Okpokwu =

- LGA
- Interactive map of Okpokwu
- Location within Nigeria
- Coordinates: 7°4′24″N 7°51′48″E
- Country: Nigeria
- State: Benue State
- Headquarters: Okpoga

Government
  - Type: Democracy

Area
  - Total: 731 km^{2} (282 sq mi)

Population (2006)
  - Total: 176,647
  - Density: 242/km^{2} (626/sq mi)
- Time zone: UTC+1 (WAT)
- Postal code: 973

Okpokwu is a Local Government Area of Benue State, Nigeria. Its headquarters are in the town of Okpoga located in the south of the area. Benue State Polytechnic is located in the town of Ugbokolo in this LGA. It has an area of 731 km^{2} and a population of 176,647 at the 2006 census. The postal code of the area is 973.

The local Government has twelve council wards namely:- Ameju, Eke, Ichama1, Ichama11, Ingle-Okpale, Ojigo, Okonobo, Okpoga Central, Okpoga North, Okpoga South, Okpoga West and Ugbokolo.

== Climate ==
Okpokwu has a tropical wet and dry climate with heavy rainfall between April and October and a dry season lasting from November to March. Temperatures generally range from 22 °C (72 °F) to 33 °C (91 °F), and annual rainfall is approximately 1,200–1,600 mm (47–63 in).

== Education ==
Okpokwu is home to the Benue State Polytechnic and New Vision Institute of Technology Ekenobi
