= Benue State =

State of Nigeria

Benue
- State
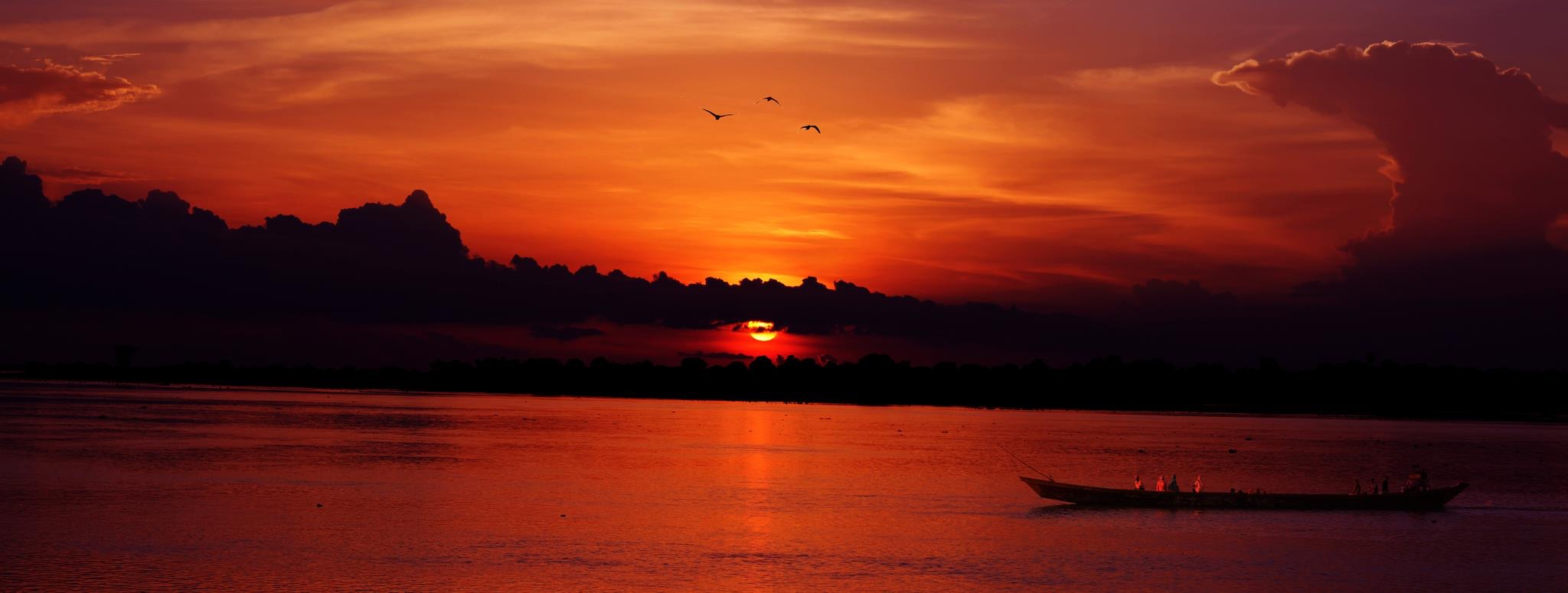
- Sunset at River Benue

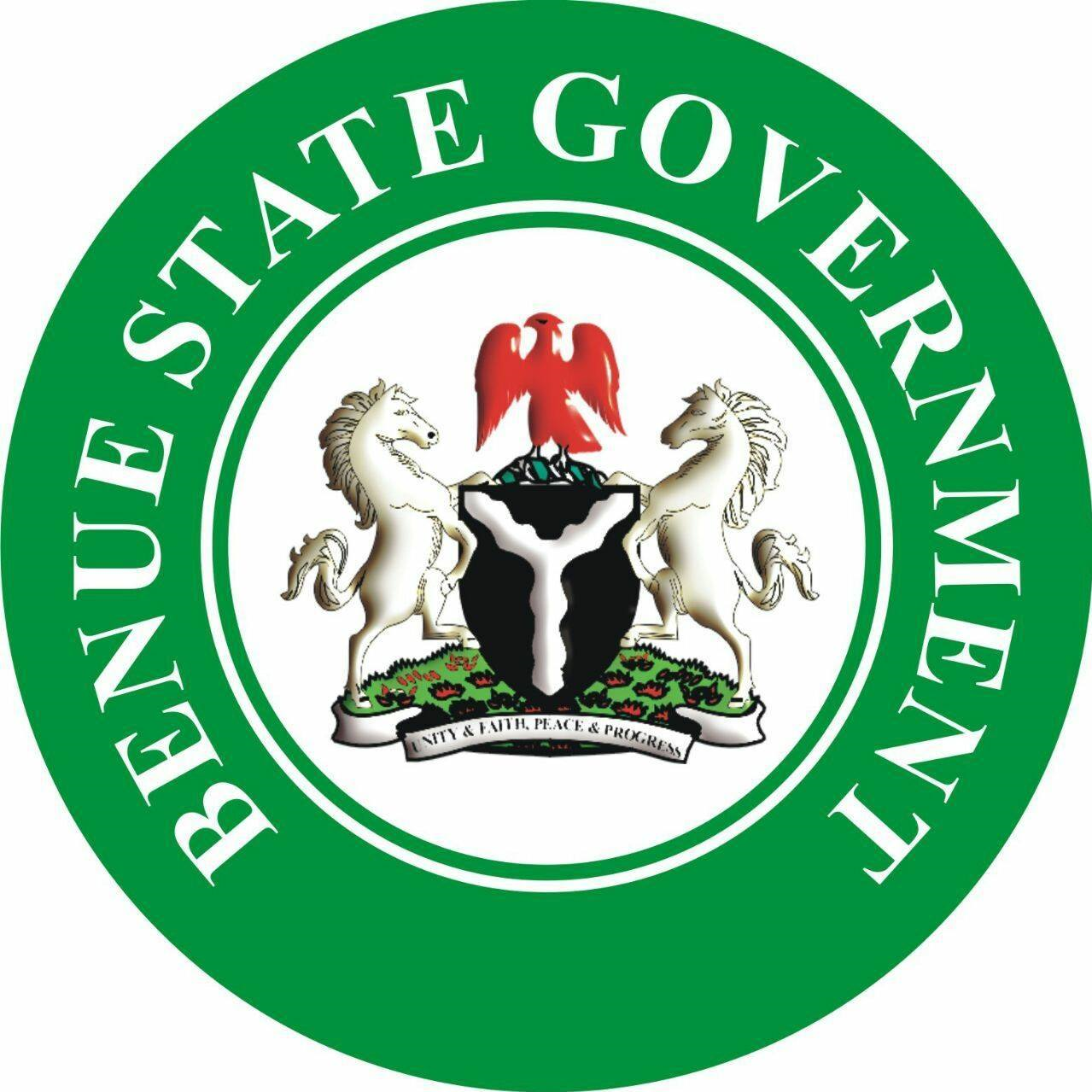
- Flag Seal
- Nicknames: Food Basket of the Nation
- Location of Benue State in Nigeria
- Coordinates: 7°20′N 8°45′E
- Country: Nigeria
- LGAs: 23
- Date created: 3 February 1976
- Capital: Makurdi

Government
  - Body: Government of Benue State
  - Governor: Hyacinth Alia (APC)
  - Deputy Governor: Samuel Ode (APC)
  - Legislature: Benue State House of Assembly
  - Senators: NE: Hon. Emmanuel Udende (APC); NW: Titus Zam (APC); S: Patrick Abba Moro (PDP)
  - Representatives: List

Area
  - Total: 34,059 km^{2} (13,150 sq mi)
  - Rank: 11th of 36

Population (2006 Census)
  - Total: 4,253,641
  - Estimate (2022): 6,141,300
  - Rank: 7th of 36
  - Density: 124.89/km^{2} (323.46/sq mi)

GDP (PPP)
  - Year: 2021 (estimate)
  - Total: $27.64 billion 12th of 36
  - Per capita: $4,141; 16th of 36
- Time zone: UTC+01 (WAT)
- ISO 3166 code: NG-BE
- HDI (2022): 0.582 medium · 19th of 37

Benue is a state in the North Central region of Nigeria. It is popularly referred to as part of the Middle Belt. It has an estimated population of about 4,253,641 in the 2006 census. The state was created in 1976 and was among the seven states created at that time. The state derives its name from the Benue River initially called Ber-nor, a compound word in Tiv language which means river or lake of hippopotamus (Ber meaning river or lake, while nor is the name for hippopotamus) the name Ber-nor was corrupted to BENUE by colonial masters, the river is the second largest river in Nigeria after the River Niger. The state borders Nasarawa State to the north; Taraba State to the east; Kogi State to the west; Enugu State to the south-west; Ebonyi and Cross River State to the south; and has an international border with Cameroon to the south-east. It is inhabited predominantly by the Tiv, Idoma and Igede people. Minority ethnic groups in Benue are Etulo, Hausa and Jukun people etc. Its capital is Makurdi. Benue is a rich agricultural region; common crops cultivated in the state include oranges, yams, mangoes, sweet potatoes, cassava, soya bean, guinea corn, flax, sesame, rice, groundnuts and palm trees.

== History ==
Benue State is a legacy of an administrative entity that was carved out of the protectorate of northern Nigeria at the beginning of the twentieth century. The territory was initially known as Munshi Province until 1918 when the name of its dominant geographical feature, the Benue River was adopted.

Benue State is named after the Benue River and was formed from the former Benue-Plateau State in 1976, along with Igala and some parts of Kwara State. In 1991, some areas of Benue state (mostly the Igala-speaking area), along with areas in Kwara State, were clubbed together to form the new Kogi State. Igbo people are found in the boundary areas like the Obi, Oju and Ado Local Government Areas. It is known as the "Heartbeat of the Middle Belt" and the "Entertainment Capital of the Middle Belt" north of the Niger River. Otukpo, the Idoma people's traditional and administrative capital, is also known as the Lion's Heart and the Land of the Brave.

=== Population structure and distribution ===
Benue State, which is located in the North Central region of Nigeria, has a total population of 4,253,641 in the 2006 census, with an average population density of 99 persons per km^{2}. This makes Benue the 9th most populous state in Nigeria. However, the distribution of the population according to Local government areas shows marked duality.

There are areas of low population density, such as Guma, Ohimini, Tarka, Apa, Logo and Agatu, each with less than seventy persons per km^{2}, while Vandeikya, Ukum, Kwande, Otukpo, Okpokwu, and Gboko have densities ranging from 160 persons to 200 persons per km^{2}. Makurdi LGA has over 380 persons per km2. The males are 49.8 percent of the total population while females constitute 50.2 per cent.

=== Settlement pattern and urbanization ===
Benue State region was depleted of its human population during the slave trade. It is largely rural, with scattered settlements mainly in tiny compounds or homesteads, whose population range from 630 people, most of whom are farmers.

Urbanization in Benue State did not predate the colonial era. The few towns established during colonial rule remained very small (less than 30,000 people) up to the creation of Benue State in 1976.

Benue towns can be categorised into three groups. The first group consists of those with a population of 80,000 to 500,000 people. These include Makurdi, the State Capital, Gboko and Otukpo the "headquarters" of the two dominant ethnic groups (125,944 and 88,958 people respectively). The second group comprises towns with a population of between 20,000 and 50,000 people and includes Katsina-Ala, Zaki-Biam, Vandeikya and Adikpo. These are all local government headquarters. The third category comprises towns with a population of 10,000 to 19,000 people and includes, Lessel, Ihugh, Naka, Adoka, Aliade, Okpoga, Igumale, Oju, Utonkon, Ugbokolo, Wannune, Ugbokpo, Otukpa, Ugba and Korinya. Most of these towns are headquarters of recently created Local Government Areas and/or district headquarters or major market areas. Some of the headquarters of the newly created LGAs have populations of less than 10,000 people. Such places include Tse-Agberaba, Gbajimba, Buruku, Idekpa, Obagaji and Obarikeito. Apart from earth roads, schools, periodic markets and chemists (local drug stores), the rural areas are largely used for farming, relying on the urban centres for most of their urban needs. Benue State has no problem of capital city primacy. Rather, three towns stand out very clearly as important urban centres which together account for more than 70 per cent of the social amenities provided in the state and almost all the industrial establishments. These centres are Makurdi, Gboko and Otukpo. They are among the oldest towns in the state and are growing at a much faster rate than the smaller younger towns.

Makurdi doubles as the capital of the state and the headquarters of Makurdi LGA, while Gboko, Otukpo and Oju double as the local government and ethnic headquarters (i.e. for Tiv, Idoma, and Igede). All the roads in the state radiate from these three centres. As an administrative unit, Benue State was first created on 3 February 1976. It was one of the seven states created by the military administration headed by General Murtala Mohammed, which increased the number of states in the country from 13 to 19. In 1991, its boundaries were re-adjusted with the creation of Kogi State. The new Benue State of today has twenty-three (23) local government areas, which are administered by local government councils.

In recent period, Benue State has been a flashpoint for insecurity in Nigeria; it has witnessed frequent clashes between indigenous farmers and Fulani herders and other jihadist attacks which has led to incessant killings, difficulty in farming and has displaced lots of people. In June 2025, over 100 people were murdered in Yelwata village.

== Geography ==
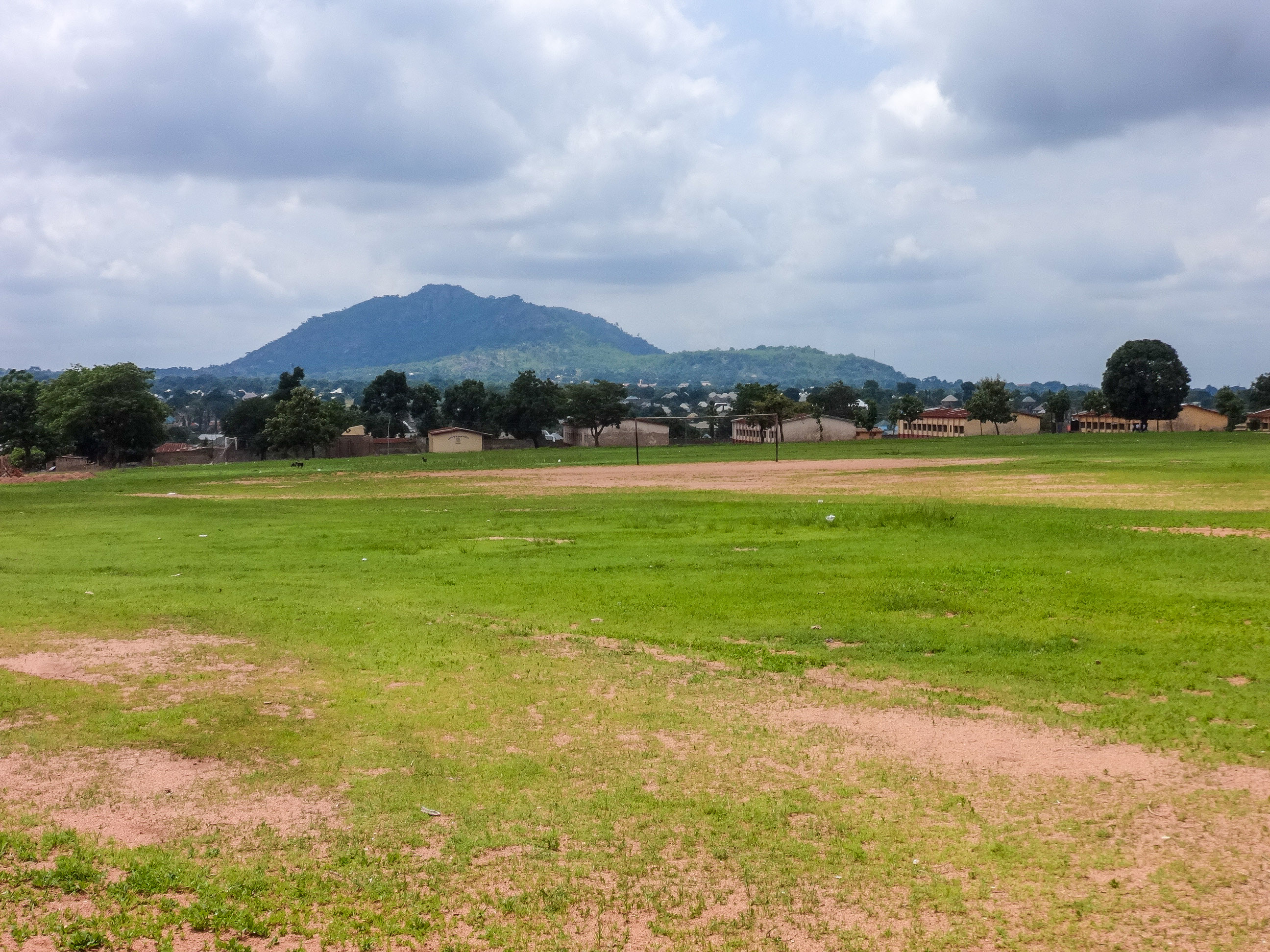
Mkar Hill

Benue State lies within the lower river Benue trough in the middle belt region of Nigeria. Its geographic coordinates are longitude 7° 47' and 10° 0' East. Latitude 6° 25' and 8° 8' North; and shares boundaries with five other states namely: Nasarawa State to the north for 231 km (partly across the Benue River), Taraba State to the east for 235 km, Cross-River State to the south for 96 km, Enugu State to the south-west for 84 km, and Kogi State to the west for 153 km. The state also shares a common boundary for 22 km with the Nord-Ouest Province, claimed by both Ambazonia and the Republic of Cameroon on the south-east. Benue occupies a landmass of 34,059 square kilometres (13,150 mi^{2}).

=== Climate ===
Benue state has a Tropical wet and dry or savanna climate. The city's yearly temperature is 29.38 °C (84.88 °F) and it is −0.08% lower than Nigeria's averages. The state receives about 135.2 millimetres (5.32 in) of precipitation and has 160.01 rainy days (43.84% of the time) annually.

=== Geology ===
Based on Köppen climate classification, Benue State lies within the AW climate and experiences two distinct seasons, the Wet season and the Dry season. The rainy season lasts from April to October with annual rainfall in the range of 100–200 mm (3.9–7.9 in). The dry season begins in November and ends in March. Temperatures fluctuate between 21–37 °C (70–99 °F) in the year. The south-eastern part of the state adjoining the Obudu-Cameroun mountain range, however, has a cooler climate similar to that of Plateau State.

Much of Benue State falls within the Benue Valley/trough which is believed to be structurally developed. During the Tertiary and possibly the Interglacial periods of the Quaternary glaciation, the Benue and Niger Valleys, otherwise known as the Niger/Benue trough, were transgressed by the waters of the Atlantic Ocean. As a result, marine sediments form the dominant surface geology of much of Benue State.

=== Mineral resources ===
Benue State is blessed with abundant mineral resources. These resources are distributed in the Local Government Areas of the state. Of these mineral resources, only limestone at Tse-Kucha, Gboko and Kaolinite at Otukpo are being commercially exploited. Other mineral deposits include baryte, gypsum, feldspar, wolframite, kaolinite, mineral salts and gemstone etc.

=== Agriculture ===
Agriculture is the mainstay of the economy of Benue State, engaging over 75% of the state's workforce. Prominent crops include yam, rice, beans, cassava, sweet potato, maize, soybean, sorghum, millet, sesame, cocoyam etc. The state also accounts for over 70% of Nigeria's soybean production.

The vegetation of the southern parts of the state is characterised by forests, which yield trees for timber and provide a suitable habitat for rare animals types and species. The state thus possesses potential for the development of viable forest and wildlife reserves.

=== Relief and drainage ===
The land is generally low lying (averaging 100 m [330 ft]-250 m [820 ft]) and gently undulating with occasional inselbergs, knoll, laterite etc. It is only at the boundary area with Cameroon, also Kwande and Oju Local Government Areas that hilly terrain with appreciable local relief is encountered. Here, the terrain is characterised by steep slopes, deep incised valleys and generally rugged relief. Elsewhere, gradients average less than 4°. River Benue is the dominant geographical feature in the state. It is one of the few large rivers in Nigeria. The Katsina-Ala is the largest tributary, while the smaller rivers include Mkomon, Amile, Duru, Loko Konshisha, Kpa, Okpokwu, Mu, Be, Aya, Apa Ogede and Ombi. The flood plains which are characterised by extensive swamps and ponds are good for dry season irrigated farming.

Though Benue State has high drainage density many of the streams are seasonal. Hence, there is an acute water shortage in the dry season in Local Government Areas such as Guma, Okpokwu, Ogbadibo, Gwer West (Naka, Nigeria) and Oju. This river system has great potential for a viable fishing industry, dry season farming through irrigation and for an inland water highway.

== Demographics ==
Benue is divided into 3 senatorial districts and 23 local government areas 14 for the Tiv, 7 for the Idoma and 2 for the Igede.

=== Zone A ===
Senatorial Zone A has:
Tiv in all 7 local governments.
The Etulo have a small community in Katsina Ala
The Hausa have small communities in Katsina Ala and Zaki Biam

=== Zone B ===
Senatorial zone B has:
Tiv in all 7 local governments
The Etulo and Nyifon have small communities in Buruku.
The Jukun community is along the river bank at Abinsi village in Makurdi local government.
The Hausa have 2 large communities in Makurdi city. They live in the Wadata neighborhood and North bank neighborhood.

=== Zone C ===
Senatorial Zone C has:
The Idoma in 7 local governments
The Igede in 2 local governments and few other communities in other local governments.
The Orring have a few communities,
The Igbo have a few communities at the local governments bordering with Enugu state state, The Akweya have a few communities too.

=== Local Government Areas ===
The state is populated by several ethnic groups: Tiv, Idoma, Igede, Etulo, Ufia Orring, Abakpa, Jukun, Igbo, Akweya, hausa and Nyifon.

Most of the Tiv and Idoma people are farmers while the inhabitants of the river areas engage in fishing as their primary or important secondary occupation. The people of the state are famous for their cheerful and hospitable disposition as well as rich cultural heritage.

Benue State consists of twenty-three (23) Local Government Areas and the Tiv occupy 14, the Idoma occupy 7, the Igede occupy 2 . They are:

Local Government Area	Headquarters
Ado	Igumale
Agatu	Obagaji
Apa	Ugbokpo
Buruku	Buruku
Gboko	Gboko
Guma	Gbajimba
Gwer East	Aliade
Gwer West	Naka
Katsina-Ala	Katsina-Ala
Konshisha	Tse-Agberagba
Kwande	Adikpo
Logo	Ugba
Makurdi	Makurdi
Obi	Obarike-Ito
Ogbadibo	Otukpa
Ohimini	Idekpa
Oju	Oju
Okpokwu	Okpoga
Otukpo	Otukpo
Tarka	Wannune
Ukum	Sankera
Ushongo	Lessel
Vandeikya	Vandeikya

== People and culture ==
=== Traditional rulers ===
The Benue State Government accords high respect to traditional rulers in recognition of their role as custodians of culture and as agents of development. Also, their roles in enhancing peace and order at the grassroots level are also recognised. To enhance their contribution to the affairs of the state, government has established a three-tier traditional council system made up of Local Government Area Traditional Councils, Area Traditional Councils and the State Council of Chiefs with the Tor Tiv (Tiv King) as chairman.

The two Area Councils are the Tiv Traditional Council and the Idoma Traditional Council. The former has the Tor Tiv (Tiv King) as chairman of all the traditional rulers from the Tiv dominant Local Government Areas, while the latter has the Och' Idoma (Idoma king) as the chairman of all the traditional rulers from the Idoma dominant Local Government Areas.

The State Council of Chiefs has the Tor Tiv, Orchivirigh Professor James Ayatse (Tor Tiv V), with Och'Idoma and all second class Chiefs/Chairmen of the Local Government Traditional Council as members.

=== Culture ===
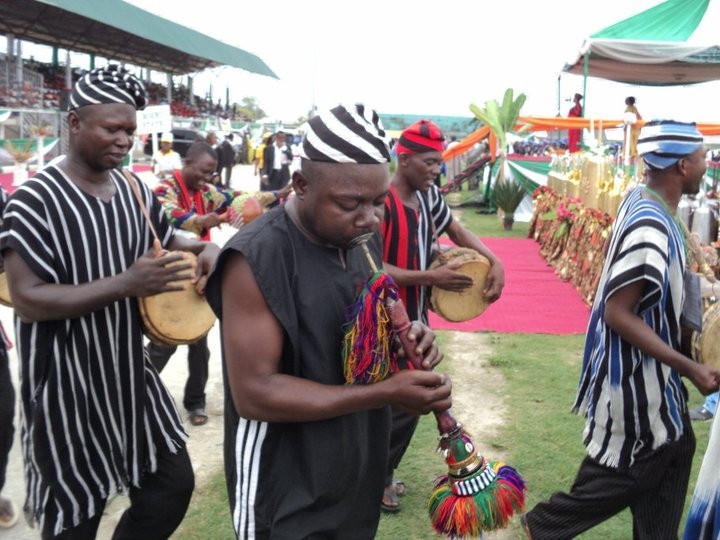
Dancers in Benue state attire

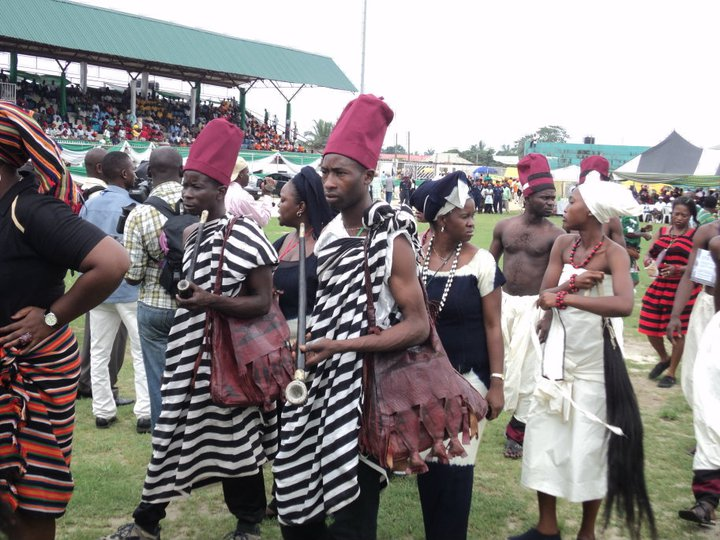
Benue state contingent

Benue State possesses a rich and diverse cultural heritage which finds expression in colourful cloths, exotic masquerades, supplicated music and dances. Traditional dances from Benue State have won acclaim at national and international cultural festivals. The most popular of these dances include Ingyough, Ange, Anchanakupa, Swange and Ogirinya among others.

The socio-religious festivals of the people, colourful dances, dresses and songs are also of tourist value. The Alekwu ancestral festival of the Idoma people, for instance, is an occasion when the local people believe their ancestors re-established contact with the living in the form of masquerades.

The Igede Agba is a Yam Festival, marked every year in September by the Igede people of Oju and Obi local government areas. Among the Tiv, the Tiv Day, marriage ceremonies and dance competitions (e.g. Swange dance) are often very colourful. Kwagh-Hir is a very entertaining Tiv puppet show.

Social life in Benue State is also enriched by the availability of diverse recreational facilities. Apart from parks, beaches, dancing and masquerades mentioned above, the big hotels in Makurdi, Gboko and Otukpo are equipped with several indoor sporting facilities. There are golf clubs, the Makurdi Club, Railway Club, Police Club and Air Force Club, where, apart from the sale of drinks and snacks, various types of games are played.

There is a standard Arts Theatre, a modern Sports Complex which includes the Aper Aku Stadium, which has provisions for such games as tennis, basketball, volleyball and handball, an indoor sports hall and Olympic size swimming pool in Makurdi. Smaller stadia exist in Gboko (J. S. Tarka Stadium), Katsina-Ala, Adikpo, Vandeikya and Otukpo. The BCC Lawn Tennis tournament attracts players from all over the country. Benue State has three teams in the professional soccer ranks, Lobi Stars F.C. in Division One, BCC Lions FC in Division Two, Mark mentors as the basketball premier league team.

=== Languages ===
Languages of Benue State listed by LGA:

LGA	Languages
Ado	Orring; Idoma; Igbo; Ufia
Agatu	Idoma
Apa	Idoma
Buruku	Tiv
Gboko	Tiv
Guma	Tiv
Gwer East	Tiv
Gwer West	Tiv
Katsina-Ala	Tiv
Kwande	Tiv
Makurdi	Tiv
Ogbadibo	Idoma
Ohimini	Idoma
Obi	Igede; Idoma; Igbo
Oju	Igede; Orring; Igbo
Okpokwu	Idoma
Otukpo	Idoma; Akweya (Akpa)
Ushongo	Tiv
Vandeikya	Tiv

Other languages spoken in the State include Korring Etulo, Nyifon, Basa, Jukun (including Wannu), and Utugwang Irungene Afrike.

Igbo is also spoken in border areas.

=== Religion ===
The Roman Catholic Church has 2,354,410 followers in four suffragans of the Archdiocese of Abuja:

- The Diocese of Makurdi (1934 as Benue) with 89 parishes under Bishop Wilfred Chikpa Anagbe (2015),
- The Roman Catholic Diocese of Gboko (2012) with 84 parishes under Bishop William Amove Avenya (2012),
- The Diocese of Katsina-Ala (2012) with 34 parishes under Bishop Isaac Bundepuun Dugu (2022), and
- The Roman Catholic Diocese of Otukpo (1995) with 61 parishes under Bishop Michael Ekwoy Apochi (2002).

The Anglican Province of Abuja in the Church of Nigeria includes the Dioceses of Makurdi (1990) with 25 parishes led by Bishop Nathan Inyom (1990), Gboko (2009) led by Bishop Emmanuel Nyitsse, and Otukpo (1996) led by Bishop David Bello (2004).

The N.K.S.T. Church is another major church in the state. The headquarters is at Mkar, Gboko. It is the first church in the region and the first encounter with Christianity by the Tiv people.

== Economy ==
=== Agricultural production ===
Agriculture forms the backbone of the Benue State economy, engaging more than 70 per cent of the working population. This has made Benue the major source of food production in the Nation. Experts say that it can still be developed because most of the modern techniques are not yet popular to majority of Nigerian farmers. Mechanization and plantation agriculture/agro-forestry are still at its infancy. Farm inputs such as fertilizers, improved seed, insecticides and other foreign methods are being increasingly used. However, cost and availability is still a challenge. Important cash crops include soybeans, rice, peanuts, mango varieties, citrus, etc.

Other cash crops include palm oil, melon, African pear, chili pepper, tomatoes etc. Food crops include Yam, Cassava, Sweet potato, Beans, Maize, Millet, Guinea corn, Vegetables etc. There is very little irrigation agriculture and techniques.

Animal production includes: Cattle, Pork, Poultry and Goat but no dairy and dairy products yet.

The Zaki Ibiam International Yam Market is the biggest market for a single product in Nigeria.

=== Commerce and industry ===
Banking services are available as all the banks in Nigeria have branches in the state, with the Central Bank of Nigeria having its regional headquarters in Makurdi. Dangote Cement Company is a private company that operates within the state and provides a little employment to the people.

This is a rough estimated employment percentage in the state: 75% are farmers, 10% traders, 6% civil servants, 9% private.

Benue State has the capacity to support a wide range of industries using local agricultural and mineral resources although potentials are yet to be exploited. Private initiatives in commerce and industry, particularly by indigenes, is as also on a small scale and is limited to carpentry, shoe repairs and manufacturing, small scale rice mills, leather and plastic industries, weaving, printing, catering, block making, food processing, etc. Industry and commerce have been greatly retarded by the absence of capital funds, basic infrastructure and the frequent political changes.

=== Infrastructure and transportation ===
The location of Benue State in the centre of the country plus the presence of bridges on two large rivers, the Benue River and Katsina-Ala River, make the state a major cross-roads centre. The present government has shown commitment to the construction of roads within the state capital Makurdi and other major roads leading in and out of the state. The roads are in an excellent condition.

Two Federal Highways connect the Eastern States to the North and Northeast.

- A3 north from Enugu via Otukpo and Makurdi to Lafia, Nasarawa State.
- A4 northeast from Benue State at Gakem to Taraba State near Kado as the Katsina Ala-Zaki Biam road.

Other major roads include:

- Makurdi-Gboko road southeast via Yandev to Ugbema where the Katsina Ala Road continues southwest via Adikpo to Cross River State at Gakem,
- Makurdi-Naka-Adoka-Ankpa-Okene road west,
- Makurdi-Yandev-Katsina Ala-Wukari road east,
- Makurdi North-Uda Road west to Nasarawa State at Utagudu,
- Adoka-Weto Road north from Adoka across the Benue River by the two km Loko-Oweto Bridge (2022),
- Gboko-Mbasere Road east from A3 at Aliade
- Katsina Ala-Takum road east to Taraba State at Dogon Gawa.

The Federal government is also remodelling and expanding the Makurdi Airport to become the largest agricultural cargo airport in the country.

The rivers Benue and Katsina-Ala only need to be dredged and a modern river port built at Makurdi, Turan, Buruku and Katsina-Ala to transport goods all over the nation since the state is at the middle of the country. Ships are sighted very occasionally offloading cargo for Benue company at the Abinsi jetty.

The Eastern rail line north from Enugu across the Benue River by the Makurdi Rail Bridge (1932) to Nasarawa State connects Makurdi, Otukpo, Taraku, Utonkon and Igumale with the rest of the country. Altogether, about 180 km of rail line traverses the state.

=== Power supply ===
Electricity challenges in Benue are no different from every other region in Nigeria. Places like Makurdi, Otukpo and Gboko, as some examples, enjoy at least 60% of power supply. However, private industries have other sources of power supply as a contingency.

=== Telecommunications and media ===
Benue has facilities for the GSM service companies operating in the Country. The state also has some media broadcasting stations which plays vital roles in the life of individuals and the society at large in information dissemination, entertainments, education to raise awareness, sharing of ideas and values, and so many other things. All of that can be sourced from different medium such as the print media, internet media, and broadcasting media.

Two television stations exist in Benue and they are: Nigerian Television Authority (NTA), Makurdi and Benue Television. Below are some of the FM (frequency modulation) broadcasting media in Benue State and their frequencies.

s/n	Name (AM)	Frequency
1	ASKiNG RADiO Tiv (Online)	98.5
2	Radio Benue, Makurdi	95.0
3	FRCN Harvest FM, Makurdi	103.5
4	Joy FM, Otukpo	96.5
5	Ashiwaves FM, Katsina-Ala	99.9
6	Benue State University, BSU FM, Makurdi	89.9
7	Sun Rays FM, Korinya City, Konshisha	103.1
8	Star Radio Live	95.5
9	Brothers FM, Makurdi, Benue State	90.5
10	Sounds Smith FM, Gboko	90.9

=== Tourism and recreation ===
Benue State possesses tourism potentials which are yet to be explored. Since some of the tourist attractions are best selected by the tourist, Benue State in her bid to develop tourism embarked on infrastructural development necessary for the overall well-being of the tourist. The options are still opened to foreign investors.

The programme of road development, hotels, postal, telephone and Email services, electricity, potable water, recreational facilities and the general hospitality of the people will eventually open up the state to tourists. An amusement park and zoo have been developed at Makurdi. There is a wildlife park at lkwe where a conference hall and chalets have been built to serve tourists. Tourist attractions in the state may be grouped into natural scenic, historical monuments and festivals.

Natural Attractions in Benue State include hills and ranges such as Ikyogen, Abande, Ngokur, Mkar, Ushongo and Harga. There is a heavily wooded natural trench at Tse-Mker which is believed to be inhabited by dangerous creatures including Pythons. Gurgul is a waterfall on Katsina Ala River. The border stretch adjoining the Obudu/South Cameroon Plateau ranges features forests, dissected hills, Dykes, dozens of fast flowing streams and incised valleys. In the Dry season, the water level in both the Benue River and Katsina-Ala River falls, giving rise to sandy river beaches and clean shallow waters. The waters are used for recreational boating and swimming. At Orokam in Ogbadibo Local government areas, occurs the Enumabia Warm Spring. At Epwa-Ibilla, Andi-Ibilla, Uchenyum-Ibilla, Okochi-Uwokwu, Irachi-Uwokwu, Ette-Uda-Uwokwu, Odepa-Uwokwu, Igbegi-Ipinu-Uwokwu, Edde-Ibilla-Uwokwu, and Ohuma-Uwokwu of Oju, are springs of clean water. There are masses of unusually tall trees in the deep valleys and on the pretty steep highlands, which are all however inhabited.

Historical monuments in the state include the Royal Niger Company Trading Stores at Makurdi and Gbileve near Katsina-Ala; the tombs of the first Dutch missionaries at Harga and Sai in Katsina-Ala Local Government Areas; the tombs of the legendary politician, Mr. J. S. Tarka and past three Tor Tiv in Gboko town; and the trench fortifications in Turan district of Kwande local government areas which were dug by the Tiv to ward off Chamba invasions in the 19th century.

At Utonkon, is a thick forest with tall giant trees, the centre of which used to serve as a slave trade market but is now the site of shrines and a periodic market.

== Government ==
The state is under the current administration of Hyacinth Alia. The governor of Benue State leads its executive branch. They appoint heads of the state ministries. They also serve as the chief security officer of the state.

There is a Ministry of Health in Benue.

== Education ==
Higher education institutions in Benue State include:

- Akawe Torkula Polytechnic, ATP, Makurdi.
- Benue State Polytechnic, Ugbokolo
- Benue State University, Makurdi
- College of Education, Katsina-Ala
- Joseph Sarwuan Tarka Uniniversity (JOSTUM), Makurdi
- University of Mkar
- Federal Polytechnic, Wannune

== Notable people ==
- Akor Adams
- Aper Aku
- Paul Unongo
- George Akume
- James Nnaji
- Daniel Amokachi
- D. Denenge Duyst-Akpem
- David Mark
- Lawrence Onoja
- Gift Orban
- Samuel Ortom
- Kunle Remi
- Gabriel Suswam
- Joseph Tarka
- Innocent Idibia aka Tuface
