= Obi, Benue State =

Obi
- LGA and town
- Interactive map of Obi
- Location within Nigeria
- Coordinates: 7°0′N 8°15′E
- Country: Nigeria
- State: Benue State
- Local Government Headquarters: Obarike-Ito

Government
  - Local Government Chairman and the Head of the Local Government Council: Peter Onche
- Time zone: UTC+1 (WAT)

Obi is a town and local government area in Benue State, Nigeria.
