= Otukpo =

LGA in Benue state, Nigeria

- LGA and Town
- Interactive map of Otukpo
- Location within Nigeria
- Coordinates: 7°11′35″N 8°8′47″E
- Country: Nigeria
- State: Benue State

Government
  - Type: Democracy
  - Local Government Chairman and the Head of the Local Government Council: John Bako Ejeh
- Time zone: UTC+1 (WAT)

Otukpo is a town in Benue State, Nigeria located in the Middle Belt Region of Nigeria. It is also the eponymous name of a subgroup of the Idoma people. Otukpo is the headquarters of the Otukpo Local Government Area. It is the headquarters of the Idoma Nation, and remains an important town in Idomaland, an area mainly populated by the Idoma speaking people, though with numerous local dialects spoken in the diverse reaches of Idoma land. Otukpo Idoma language is the umbrella lingua.

Otukpo is the seat of the Och' Idoma, the Paramount Ruler Idoma of the Idoma Nation. The traditional ruler of Idoma is Ogbodo John Elaigwu. Though his legitimacy as Och Idoma has been questioned by a large section of Idoma elites, traditional district heads, and the youth. As at the time of publication the case is said to be in court. Elaigwu Ogbodo was a card-carrying member of the PDP and a close ally with the Deputy Governorship candidate and Chairman John Ngbede. It is said Ngbede was very instrumental to his emergence as king.

== Climate ==
Otukpo has a tropical savanna climate. It is warm every month with both a wet and dry season. There is about 6,200 millimetres (244 inches) of rain a year. It is dry for 169 days a year with an average humidity of 61% and an UV-index of 7. The climate is tropical in Otukpo. The average annual temperature in Otukpo is 27.2 °C. In the month of August, the average temperature is 25.5 °C. It is the lowest average temperature of the whole year.

== Religion ==
The people of Otukpo are predominantly Christians. Christianity came into the town during the colonial era. The Roman Catholic church is the pioneer church in the land and is popularly referred to as Church 'ufada' (the Reverend Father's church). The Methodist church is also popular in the area. Of late, there has been proliferation of Pentecostal churches in Otukpo. There is also the presence of traditional worship (Alekwu) in Otukpo. Although traditional worship is gradually going extinct, the Alekwu (ancestral) Onyonkpo and Achukwu deities are held sacred in many villages of Otukpo. There is also the practice of Islam by the indigenous people of Otukpo. The Abu family in Otukpo town are the first indigenous Idoma people in Otukpo that embraced and practised Islam. Other Idoma indigenes that practised Islam in Otukpo are the Sule Ujor family, Sule Audu and the Samsudeen Amali family. Also, the family of professor samsudeen Amali of Upu village are of the Islamic faith.

== Transport ==
Otukpo is served by a train station on the national railway network as well as numerous bus and taxi services such as Benue Links, Ejifa Transport, Silver Travels, Pleasure Travels, Calculux and Ifesinachi which travel to every major city in Nigeria daily.

== Some prominent places in Otukpo ==
- Ogobia,
- Upu,
- Otukpoicho,
- Otobi,
- Adoka,
- Oyagede, and
- Akpa-Igede.

== See also ==
- Railway stations in Nigeria
- Roman Catholic Diocese of Otukpo
- St. Mark's Country Golf Course
