= 2023 Benue State gubernatorial election =

2023 gubernatorial election in Benue State, Nigeria

- 18 March 2023
- Registered: 2,777,727
Nominee	Hyacinth Alia	Titus Uba	Herman Hembe
Party	APC	PDP	LP
Running mate	Samuel Ode	John Ngbede	Christopher Onyiloyi Idu
Popular vote	473,933	223,913	41,881
Percentage	62.61%	29.58%	5.53%
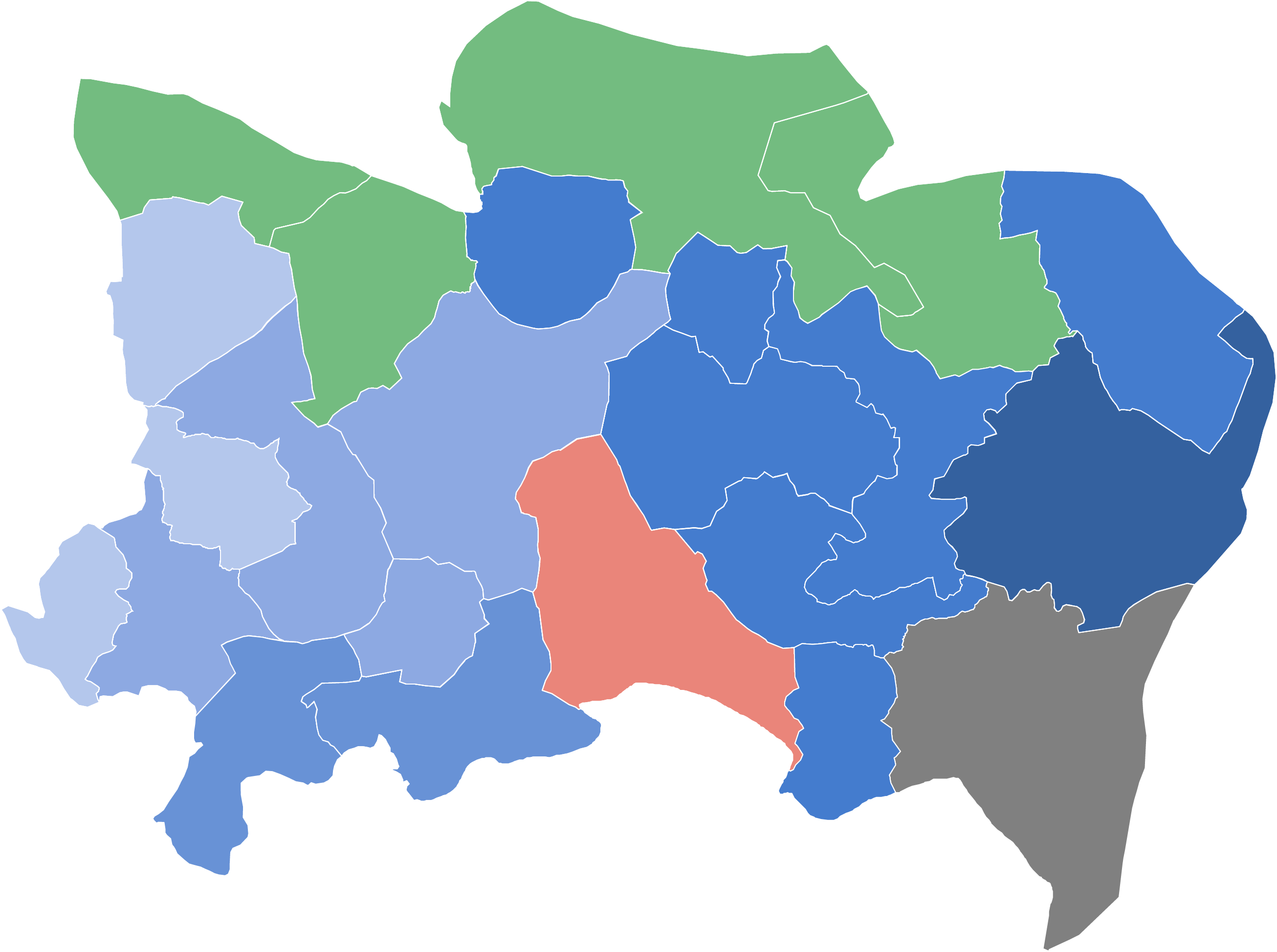
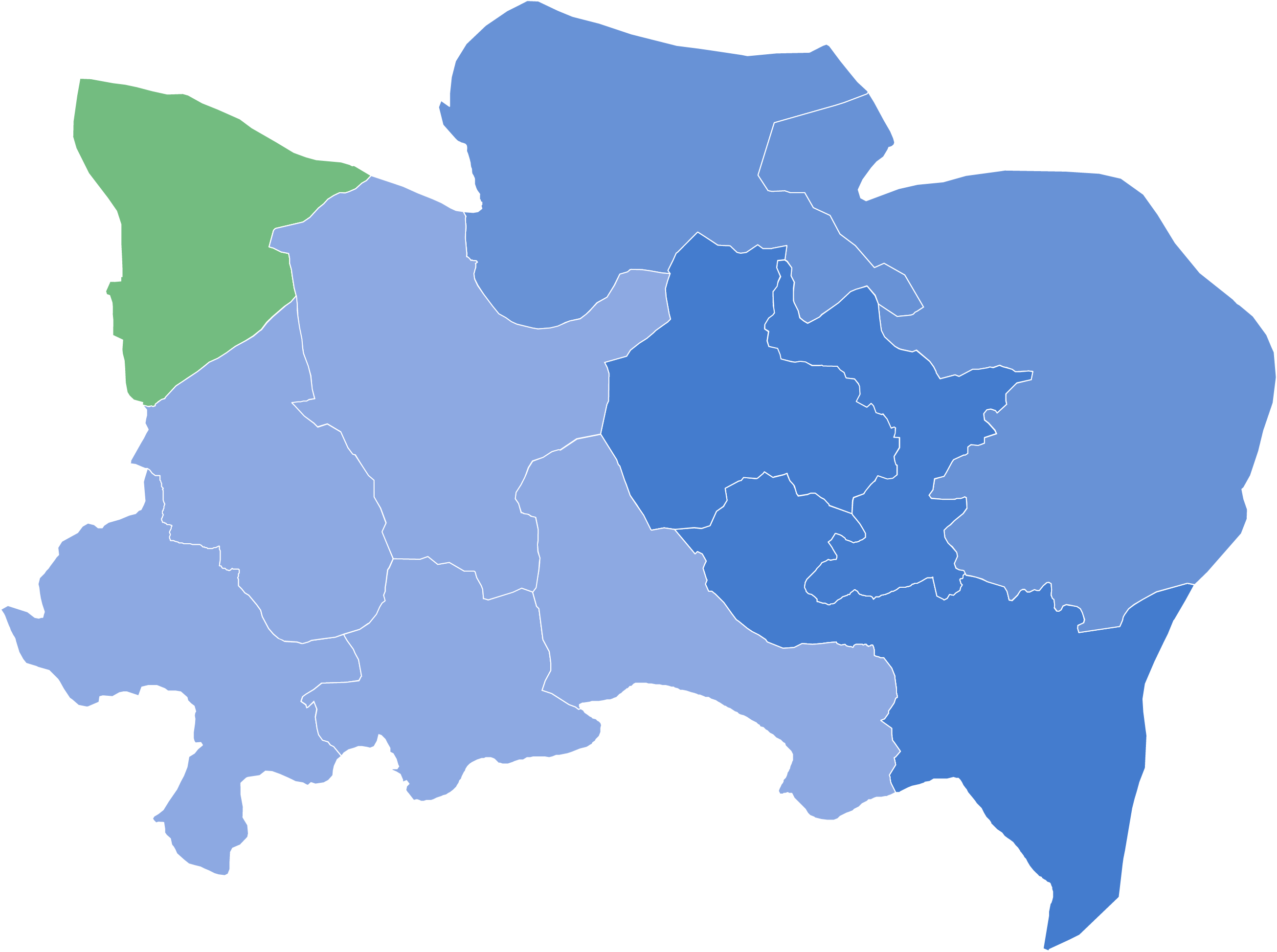
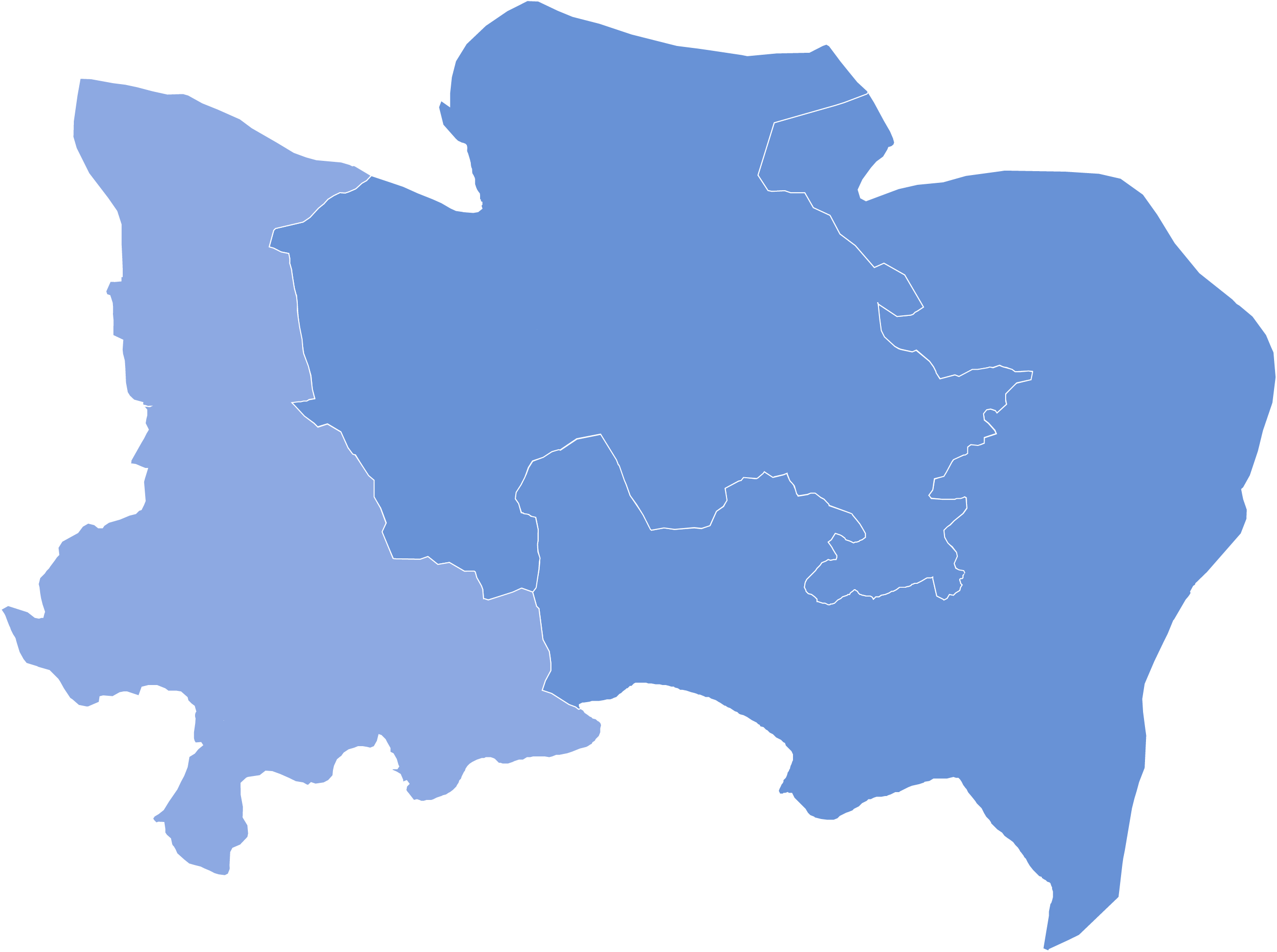
- Alia: 40–50% 50–60% 60–70% 70–80% 80–90% Hembe: 50–60% Uba: 50–60% No election held
Governor before election
Samuel Ortom
PDP
Elected Governor
Hyacinth Alia
APC

The 2023 Benue State gubernatorial election took place on 18 March 2023, to elect the governor of Benue State, concurrent with elections to the Benue State House of Assembly as well as twenty-seven other gubernatorial elections and elections to all other state houses of assembly. The election — which was postponed from its original 11 March date — was held three weeks after the presidential election and National Assembly elections. Incumbent PDP Governor Samuel Ortom was term-limited and could not seek re-election to a third term. Hyacinth Alia — a suspended Catholic priest — gained the office for the APC by a 33% margin over PDP nominee House of Assembly Speaker Titus Uba.

Party primaries were scheduled for between 4 April and 9 June 2022 with the Peoples Democratic Party nominating Uba on 25 May while the All Progressives Congress first held its primary on 26 and 27 May nominating Alia; however, the primary was partially annulled and a rerun was held on 9 June that was also won by Alia. Despite the initial annulment, the rerun itself was partially annulled by a Court of Appeal ruling in January 2023 which ordered the APC to hold a third primary in 11 local government areas. The new exercise, held on 2 February, resulted in a third victory for Alia.

On 20 March, collation completed and INEC Returning Officer Faruk Kuta declared Alia as the victor. Official results show Alia winning nearly 474,000 votes and 63% of the vote as runner-up Uba received around 224,000 votes and 30% of the vote while LP nominee Herman Hembe came third with about 41,000 votes and 6% of the vote. However, within days of the declaration, Uba announced that he would challenge the results at the electoral tribunal.

== Electoral system ==
The governor of Benue State is elected using a modified two-round system. To be elected in the first round, a candidate must receive the plurality of the vote and over 25% of the vote in at least two-thirds of state local government areas. If no candidate passes this threshold, a second round will be held between the top candidate and the next candidate to have received a plurality of votes in the highest number of local government areas.

== Background ==
Benue State is a diverse, agriculture-based state in the Middle Belt; although it is nicknamed the "Food Basket of the Nation" and has vast natural resources, Benue has faced challenges in security as inter-ethnic violence and conflict between herders and farmers heavily affect the state. The overproliferation of weaponry and increased pressure for land along with failures in governance led to the worsening of these clashes in the years ahead of the election.

Politically, Benue's 2019 elections were categorized as a swing back towards the PDP in the aftermath of Ortom's 2018 defection back to the party. On the federal level, PDP nominee Atiku Abubakar narrowly won the state after Buhari had won it in 2015; legislatively, the PDP swept all three Senate seats and won seven House of Representatives seats. Statewise, Ortom won re-election by over 10% of the vote and the PDP won a majority in the House of Assembly.

During its second term, the Ortom administration's stated focuses included economic growth, stopping herder-farmer and ethnic conflicts, and infrastructural development. In terms of his performance, Ortom was commended for his proposals to end herder-farmer conflicts while being criticized for deflecting responsibility for insecurity, the initial failure of a 2019 peace meeting between Tiv and Jukun groups, a flawed COVID-19 response, his brief early 2021 spat with Bauchi State Governor Bala Mohammed which descended into ethnic gibes, a corrupt land grab, and his perceived obsession with picking fights with the federal government.

== Primary elections ==
The primaries, along with any potential challenges to primary results, were to take place between 4 April and 3 June 2022 but the deadline was extended to 9 June. Arguments over an informal zoning gentlemen's agreement have led to disputes over whether it is the turn of the Jechira Tiv in Benue North-West Senatorial District, the Kwande Tiv in Benue North-East Senatorial District, and the Idoma in Benue South Senatorial District. The Jechira Gubernatorial Movement claims right to the governorship as they are the only Tiv subgroup to never have a governor complete a term, some Kwande people claim right to the governorship as some activists count the Jechira Governor Moses Adasu's shortened term and thus the rotation between Tiv subgroups would start again with the Kwande, and Idoma groups claim right to the governorship as no Idoma has ever held the office.

While the major parties zoned their nominations to both a Jechira Tiv-majority area and the Idoma-majority Benue South Senatorial District, the PDP nominated a Tiv person while the APC nominee is from Benue South.

=== All Progressives Congress ===
In early May 2022, the state party zoned its nomination to two areas: the Jechira Tiv-majority local government areas of Vandeikya and Konshisha in the North-East and the entire South Senatorial District.

On 20 April 2022, the APC National Executive Committee announced the party's schedule for gubernatorial primaries, setting its expression of interest form price at ₦10 million and nomination form price at ₦40 million with a 50% nomination form discount for candidates younger than 40 while women and candidates with disabilities get free nomination forms. Forms were to be sold from 26 April to 6 May until the deadline was later extended to 10 May then 12 May. After the submission of nomination forms by 13 May, candidates were screened by a party committee on 14 and 15 May while 16 May was the date for the screening appeal process. Ward congresses and LGA congresses were set for between 7 and 9 May to elect delegates for the primary. Candidates approved by the screening process advanced to a primary set for 26 May, in concurrence with other APC gubernatorial primaries; challenges to the result could be made the next day.

Ahead of the primary, it was announced that the Benue APC would use the direct primary method to elect its nominee. However, on primary day, the absence of election officials led to long delays and the postponement of some voting to 27 May. After voting completed, Hyacinth Alia—a suspended Catholic priest—was announced as winner with over 525,000 votes, about 64% of the vote. Immediately after the results were released, several of Alia's opponents rejected the vote totals as fabricated and petitioned the party for an annulment while one candidate—MHR Herman Hembe—left the party in protest. On 4 June, the primary appeal committee released its report, recommending the primary's annulment due to the committee being unable to confirm the veracity of several results sheets; in response, the APC National Working Committee ordered a rerun primary in 12 local government areas scheduled for 9 June. In the rerun primary, Alia again came first as he won about 195,000 votes, about 72% of the vote. However, his opponents again rejected the results with Michael Aondoakaa suing the party as Barnabas Andyar Gemade blamed minister George Akume for rigging the election. Aondoakaa's lawsuit was dismissed by a Federal High Court ruling in November 2022. However, the lawsuit of another losing aspirant— Terhemba Shija—was partially successful as a Court of Appeal ruling in January 2023 nullified the primary and ordered a rerun in the 11 local government areas that were not covered by the June rerun. While the APC accepted the ruling and prepared to hold the rerun, Shija rejected it and appealed to higher courts. Despite the appeal, the party swiftly organised the rerun for 2 February with it resulting in a third Alia victory.

==== Nominated ====
- Hyacinth Alia: suspended Catholic priest
  - Running mate—Sam Ode: 2019 APC deputy gubernatorial nominee and former Minister of State for Niger Delta

==== Eliminated in primary ====
- Michael Aondoakaa: Minister of Justice and Attorney General of the Federation (2008–2010)
- Mathias Byuan: businessman
- Barnabas Andyar Gemade: former senator for Benue North-East (2011–2019)
- Herman Hembe: House of Representatives member for Konshisha/Vandeikya (2007–present) (defected after the primary and prior to the rerun primary to successfully run in the LP gubernatorial primary)
- Godwin Ityoachimin: surveyor
- Steven Lawani: former Deputy Governor (2007–2015)
- Anyom Mlanga
- Sam Ode: 2019 APC deputy gubernatorial nominee and former Minister of State for Niger Delta
- Terwase Orbunde: former chief of staff to Governor Samuel Ortom
- Terhemba Shija: former Commissioner of Local Government and Chieftaincy Affairs and former House of Representatives member
- Bernard Yisa: architect

==== Withdrew ====
- Dickson Akoh: National Commandant of the Peace Corps
- Silas Akoso
- Terlumun Akputu: former Kwande Local Government Chairman
- Joseph Alakali: professor
- Roseline Ada Chenge: 2015 PDP gubernatorial candidate
- Jacob Dzurgba: banker
- Msoo Ghasarah
- Levi Lumun Icheen: engineer and son of former House of Assembly Speaker Margaret Icheen
- Terlumun Ikya: economic consultant
- Emmanuel Jime: 2019 APC gubernatorial nominee, former House of Representatives member, former House of Assembly member, and former speaker of the House of Assembly
- Jeff Kuraun: geologist
- John Asen Loko
- Daniel Onjeh: 2015 APC Benue South senatorial nominee and activist
- Mathias Oyigeya: doctor
- Richard Tersoo Mnenga: Universal Basic Education Commission Board member
- George Nduul: engineer
- Mark Tersoo Hanmantion: businessman
- Mcdonald Ter Tor
- Terhemen Tilley-Gyado: engineer (defected prior to the primary to successfully run in the ADC gubernatorial primary)
- John Tor Tsuwa: former chairman of the Benue State Independent Electoral Commission
- Bem Tseen: former Kwande Local Government Chairman
- Paul Ugba Uye
- Benjamin Wayo
- Nick Wende: former Commissioner for Water Resources and Environment
- Joseph Kuhe Yashi

==== Results ====
Annulled original primary results
Candidates' vote share
1. Hyacinth Alia (64.6%)
2. Mathias Byuan (14.0%)
3. Sam Ode (9.73%)
4. Steven Lawani (5.75%)
5. Other candidates (5.96%)

APC original primary results
Party	Candidate	Votes	%
APC	Hyacinth Alia	526,807	64.60%
APC	Mathias Byuan	113,816	13.96%
APC	Sam Ode	79,369	9.73%
APC	Steven Lawani	46,882	5.75%
APC	Michael Aondoakaa	24,596	3.02%
APC	Terwase Orbunde	12,446	1.53%
APC	Terlumun Ikya (withdrawn)	3,680	0.45%
APC	Herman Hembe	2,473	0.30%
APC	Barnabas Andyar Gemade	2,365	0.29%
APC	Godwin Ityoachimin	1,228	0.15%
APC	Terhemba Shija	1,048	0.13%
APC	Bernard Yisa	742	0.09%
APC	Anyom Mlanga	0	0.00%
Total votes		815,452	100.00%
Invalid or blank votes		0	N/A
Turnout		815,452	Unknown

Partially annulled rerun primary results
Candidates' vote share
1. Hyacinth Alia 72.24 (68.6%)
2. Steven Lawani 8.85 (8.41%)
3. Sam Ode 8.03 (7.63%)
4. Mathias Byuan 5.23 (4.97%)
5. Other candidates 10.88 (10.3%)

APC rerun primary results
Party	Candidate	Votes	%
APC	Hyacinth Alia	195,314	72.24%
APC	Steven Lawani	23,925	8.85%
APC	Sam Ode	21,698	8.03%
APC	Mathias Byuan	14,152	5.23%
APC	Barnabas Andyar Gemade	3,831	1.42%
APC	Michael Aondoakaa	3,517	1.30%
APC	Terlumun Ikya (withdrawn)	2,746	1.02%
APC	Terhemba Shija	1,859	0.69%
APC	Terwase Orbunde	1,393	0.52%
APC	Godwin Ityoachimin	860	0.32%
APC	Herman Hembe (withdrawn)	720	0.27%
APC	Bernard Yisa	338	0.13%
APC	Anyom Mlanga	0	0.00%
Total votes		270,353	100.00%
Invalid or blank votes		0	N/A
Turnout		270,353	73.75%

Candidates' vote share
1. Hyacinth Alia (84.4%)
2. Sam Ode (4.59%)
3. Steven Lawani (4.35%)
4. Other candidates (6.69%)

APC June rerun primary results (12 LGAs) + February rerun primary results (11 LGAs)
Party	Candidate	Votes	%
APC	Hyacinth Alia	410,682	84.37%
APC	Sam Ode	22,319	4.59%
APC	Steven Lawani	21,172	4.35%
APC	Mathias Byuan	14,593	3.00%
APC	Barnabas Andyar Gemade	5,125	1.05%
APC	Michael Aondoakaa	3,815	0.78%
APC	Terlumun Ikya (withdrawn)	2,851	0.59%
APC	Terhemba Shija	2,217	0.46%
APC	Terwase Orbunde	1,391	0.29%
APC	Godwin Ityoachimin	1,139	0.23%
APC	Herman Hembe (withdrawn)	638	0.13%
APC	Bernard Yisa	581	0.12%
APC	Anyom Mlanga	219	0.04%
Total votes		486,742	100.00%

=== People's Democratic Party ===
On 3 February 2021, Governor Samuel Ortom ordered all his appointees to suspend their gubernatorial campaigns or resign; this directive applied to his chief of staff Terwase Orbunde, who had announced his run for governor on 7 January. Orbunde suspended his campaign on 7 February. Ortom later directed any appointees preparing to run in a 2023 election to resign by 30 September; on that day, five appointees resigned with three (Orbunde, Water Resources Commissioner Dondo Ahire, and Education Commissioner Dennis Ityavyar) intending to run for governor.

On 11 July 2021, Ortom said that the Benue PDP would decide whether to zone their nomination to either Benue South or Benue North-East. This statement was a few days before meeting with PDP gubernatorial aspirants on 16 July. But in early April 2022, the state party zoned its nomination to two local government areas: the Jechira Tiv-majority Vandeikya in the North-East and the Idoma-majority Otukpo in the South with the goal of southern and north-eastern party leaders unofficially agreeing on one candidate each who would then face each other in the primary. Reportedly, the southern candidate is Deputy Governor Benson Abounu while reports stated that there was an internal rift in the Benue PDP over the unofficial north-eastern candidate as Ortom (who has publicly come out in favor of a north-eastern Tiv nominee instead of a southern Idoma nominee) backed Ityavyar while PDP National Chairman Iyorchia Ayu supported Assembly Speaker Titus Uba, party stakeholders eventually reached a decision on 18 April when it was announced that Uba would be the north-eastern candidate. However, the arrangement was controversial as some candidates derided the process as undemocratic and lacking in transparency before they bought forms anyway.

On 16 March 2022, the national PDP announced its gubernatorial primaries' schedule, setting its expression of interest form price at ₦1 million and the nomination form price at ₦20 million with a 50% discount for candidates between 25 and 30. Forms were to be sold until 1 April but the party later extended the deadline four times before reaching a final deadline of 22 April. After the submission of nomination forms by 25 April, candidates were screened by a party committee on 28 April while 2 May was the rescheduled date for the screening appeal process. Ward congresses were set for 29 April and LGA congresses were rescheduled for 10 May to elect delegates for the primary. Candidates approved by the screening process advanced to a primary set for 25 May, in concurrence with all other PDP gubernatorial primaries; challenges to the result could be made in the following days.

On the primary date, candidates contested an indirect primary in Makurdi that ended with Uba emerging as the PDP nominee after results showed him winning just under 90% of the delegates' votes. In his acceptance speech, Uba thanked his former opponents and party supporters. Although he accepted the results and congratulated Uba, Abounu lamented discrimination against Idoma during his own speech. A few days later, Ortom announced state PDP chairman John Ngbede would be the party's deputy gubernatorial nominee with observers noting the regional balance as Ngbede is from Benue South.

==== Nominated ====
- Titus Uba: House of Assembly member for Kyan and Speaker of the House of Assembly (2018–present)
  - Running mate—John Ngbede: state PDP chairman

==== Eliminated in primary ====
- Benson Abounu: Deputy Governor (2015–present) and former commissioner
- Ben Akaakar: engineer (defected after the primary to unsuccessfully run in the LP gubernatorial primary)
- Paul Angya: former Standards Organisation of Nigeria Director General
- Dennis Ityavyar: former Commissioner for Education
- Terkaa Ucha: House of Assembly member for Vandeikya-Tiev

==== Withdrew ====
- Christopher Afaor: former House of Assembly member
- Adikpo Agbatse: former Executive Secretary of the Benue State Emergency Management Agency
- Dondu Ahire: former Commissioner for Water Resources and Solid Minerals
- Dominic Akahan
- Terver Akase: former Chief Press Secretary to Governor Samuel Ortom
- Donatus Doosoon Akumbur
- Julius Atorough: businessman
- Terver Atsar: engineer
- Peter Chieshe: pharmacist
- Tertsea Gbishe: House of Assembly member for Kwande East
- Chille Igbawua: former House of Representatives member for Kwande/Ushongo (2007–2011)
- Joe Ikyagba: former aide to Governor Samuel Ortom
- Isaiah Terhemen Ipevnor
- Boniface Verr Jirbo
- Patrick Ogbu: former chairman of Nigerian Television Authority board of directors
- Terwase Orbunde: former chief of staff to Governor Samuel Ortom (defected prior to the primary to unsuccessfully run in the APC gubernatorial primary)
- Paul Orhii: former National Agency for Food and Drug Administration and Control director-general
- Robert Orya: former Managing Director/CEO of NEXIM
- Paul Ubwa: President of the Benue Chamber of Commerce, Industry, Mines and Agriculture
- Susan Waya: socialite

==== Declined ====
- Abba Moro: Senator for Benue North-East (2019–present) and former Minister of the Interior (2011–2015)

==== Results ====
Candidates' vote share
1. Titus Uba (89.6%)
2. Benson Abounu (9.93%)
3. Other candidates (0.49%)

PDP primary results
Party	Candidate	Votes	%
PDP	Titus Uba	731	89.58%
PDP	Benson Abounu	81	9.93%
PDP	Dennis Ityavyar	2	0.25%
PDP	Paul Angya	1	0.12%
PDP	Dominic Ucha	1	0.12%
PDP	Ben Akaakar	0	0.00%
Total votes		816	100.00%
Invalid or blank votes		20	N/A
Turnout		836	Unknown

=== Minor parties ===
- Matthias Oyigeya (Accord)
  - Running mate: Atorugh Ape Elizabeth
- Matthew Asemayina Dabu (Action Alliance)
  - Running mate: Ochonu Francis Ochonu
- Roseline Ada Chenge (Action Democratic Party)
  - Running mate: Thaddeus Gwaza
- Terrumun Kenneth Kwadzah (Action Peoples Party)
  - Running mate: Grace Agada
- Ewaoche Benjamin Obe (African Action Congress)
  - Running mate: Vera Ladi Arase
- Terhemen Tilley-Gyado (African Democratic Congress)
  - Running mate: Sunday Okoh
- Joseph Waya (All Progressives Grand Alliance)
  - Running mate: Uhwana Isaac Ode
- Herman Hembe (Labour Party)
  - Running mate: Christopher Onyiloyi Idu
- Bem Reuben Angwe (New Nigeria Peoples Party)
  - Running mate: Comfort Ogbaji
- Sam Inalegwu Abah (National Rescue Movement)
  - Running mate: Roselyn Saalu]
- Levi Lumun Icheen (People's Redemption Party)
  - Running mate: Sunday Idakwo Emmanuel
- James Bemgbator Mede (Social Democratic Party)
  - Running mate: Ameh Ebute
- Roberts Orya (Young Progressives Party)
  - Running mate: Iduh Fidel Agaba
- Aondona Catherine Dabo-Adzuana (Zenith Labour Party)
  - Running mate: Ocheme Ogbe

== Campaign ==
The early parts of the general election campaign focused on dealing with the aftermath of contentious party primaries. As controversy in the PDP centered around the party again refusing to choose a nominee from the Southern part of the state, Uba's post-primary reconciliation move was to pick a running mate from the region—John Ngbede from Agatu LGA. In the APC, the controversy was mainly about the conduct of the primary itself as most of Alia's opponents rejected the results as fabricated. One of these opponents, Barnabas Andyar Gemade, and his allies wrote an open letter to President Muhammadu Buhari that accused minister George Akume of imposing Alia as nominee and claimed that his continued candidacy could led to the party's disqualification. In July 2022, Uba attempted to capitalize on the APC crisis by asking a court to disqualify Alia based on the claims of his intraparty opponents.

Immediately after the primaries, observers noted the peculiarity of Alia's candidacy due to his occupation as a Catholic priest. He drew comparisons with former governor Moses Adasu, who was also a Catholic priest. While it was also noted that the Church suspended Alia from the priesthood in May 2022, analysts said his profession was a major part of his primary campaign and Alia himself said that he was deciding "to extend it [the gospel] to governance." By January 2023, observers continued focus on Alia's popularity but noted the power of incumbency benefiting Uba. On the other hand, Uba's weeks-long medical vacation removed him from campaigning and led to questions on his fitness to govern. Reporting also pointed out other potential factors such as legal cases against Alia's nomination and insecurity along with the more prominent minor party nominees—Joseph Waya (APGA), Herman Hembe (LP), and Bem Angwe (NNPP). Later that month, discussion on the potential impact of challenges to the APC primary proved accurate as a Court of Appeal ruling partially nullified the party's primary and ordered a rerun in 11 local government areas. However, the third primary simply resulted in another Alia victory and the continuation of his general election campaign.

Later in February, focus switched to the nearing presidential election on 25 February. In the election, Benue voted for Bola Tinubu (APC); Tinubu won the state with 40.3% of the vote, beating Peter Obi (LP) at 40.0% and Atiku Abubakar (PDP) at 16.9%. Aside from the presidential result—which itself was a surprise as projections favored Obi, the senatorial elections had another surprise with Ortom losing to the APC in the North-West district. These two results, coupled with Ortom's low approval compared to Alia's popularity, led analysts in later February and early March to focus on Alia's rising chances. Additionally, the presidential result pushed journalists to label Hembe as a major candidate, considering the high total of Obi.

== Projections ==
Source	Projection	As of
Africa Elects (Note: AfricaElects projections predict the likelihood of a candidate winning a state by categorizing a state as "Safe" for exceedingly likely, "Likely" for somewhat likely, and "Lean" for least likely. If no clear determination could be made, states are categorized as "tossups".)	Likely Alia	17 March 2023
Enough is Enough- SBM Intelligence (Note: EiE-SBM projections predict which candidates will win states.)	Alia	2 March 2023

== Conduct ==
=== Electoral timetable ===
On 26 February 2022, the Independent National Electoral Commission released the timetable, setting out key dates and deadlines for the election. Months later on 27 May 2022, INEC made a slight revision to the timetable, allowing parties extra time to conduct primaries.

- 28 February 2022 – Publication of Notice of Election
- 4 April 2022 – First day for the conduct of party primaries
- 9 June 2022 (Note: The original deadline was 3 June; however, INEC pushed it back to 9 June at the behest of parties.) – Final day for the conduct of party primaries, including the resolution of disputes arising from them
- 1 July 2022 – First day for submission of nomination forms to INEC via the online portal
- 15 July 2022 – Final day for submission of nomination forms to INEC via the online portal
- 12 October 2022 – Commencement of the official campaign period
- 16 March 2023 (Note: The original deadline was 9 March; however, INEC pushed it back to 16 March.) – Final day of the official campaign period

== General election ==
=== Results ===
2023 Benue State gubernatorial election
Party	Candidate	Votes	%
A	Matthias Oyigeya		
AA	Matthew Asemayina Dabu		
ADP	Roseline Ada Chenge		
APP	Terrumun Kenneth Kwadzah		
AAC	Ewaoche Benjamin Obe		
ADC	Terhemen Tilley-Gyado		
APC	TBD		
APGA	Joseph Waya		
LP	Herman Hembe		
New Nigeria Peoples Party	Bem Reuben Angwe		
NRM	Sam Inalegwu Abah		
PDP	Titus Uba		
PRP	Levi Lumun Icheen		
SDP	James Bemgbator Mede		
YPP	Roberts Orya		
ZLP	Aondona Catherine Dabo-Adzuana		
Total votes			100.00%
Invalid or blank votes			N/A
Turnout			

==== By senatorial district ====
The results of the election by senatorial district.

Senatorial District	Hyacinth Alia APC		Herman Hembe LP		Titus Uba PDP		Others		Total Valid Votes
Senatorial District	Votes	Percentage	Votes	Percentage	Votes	Percentage	Votes	Percentage	Total Valid Votes
Benue North-East Senatorial District (Note: Comprising the local government areas of Katsina-Ala, Konshisha, Kwande, Logo, Vandeikya, Ukum, and Ushongo.) (Zone A)	171,153	65.79%	23,561	9.06%	60,291	23.18%	5,140	1.98%	260,145
Benue North-West Senatorial District (Note: Comprising the local government areas of Buruku, Gboko, Gwer East, Gwer West, Guma, Makurdi, and Tarka.) (Zone B)	207,953	66.13%	9,931	3.16%	92,140	29.30%	4,421	1.41%	314,445
Benue South Senatorial District (Note: Comprising the local government areas of Ado, Agatu, Apa, Obi, Ogbadibo, Ohimini, Oju, Okpokwu, and Otukpo.) (Zone C)	94,827	52.02%	8,389	4.60%	71,482	39.22%	7,576	4.16%	182,274
Totals	473,933	62.61%	41,881	5.53%	223,913	29.58%	17,176	2.28%	756,903

==== By federal constituency ====
The results of the election by federal constituency.

Federal Constituency	Hyacinth Alia APC		Herman Hembe LP		Titus Uba PDP		Others		Total Valid Votes
Federal Constituency	Votes	Percentage	Votes	Percentage	Votes	Percentage	Votes	Percentage	Total Valid Votes
Ado/Ogbadibo/Okpokwu Federal Constituency (Note: Comprising the local government areas of Ado, Ogbadibo, and Okpokwu.)	25,615	51.75%	1,752	3.54%	19,045	38.47%	3,089	6.24%	49,501
Apa/Agatu Federal Constituency (Note: Comprising the local government areas of Apa and Agatu.)	15,407	44.71%	681	1.98%	17,740	51.48%	635	1.84%	34,463
Buruku Federal Constituency (Note: Comprising the local government area of Buruku.)	34,713	75.57%	1,155	2.51%	9,513	20.71%	556	1.21%	45,937
Gboko/Tarka Federal Constituency (Note: Comprising the local government areas of Gboko and Tarka.)	70,407	73.38%	1,668	1.74%	22,521	23.47%	1,352	1.41%	95,948
Guma/Makurdi Federal Constituency (Note: Comprising the local government areas of Guma and Makurdi.)	71,803	63.65%	4,327	3.84%	34,412	30.50%	2,262	2.01%	112,804
Gwer East/Gwer West Federal Constituency (Note: Comprising the local government areas of Gwer East and Gwer West.)	31,030	51.93%	2,781	4.65%	25,694	43.00%	251	0.42%	59,756
Katsina-Ala/Ukum/Logo Federal Constituency (Note: Comprising the local government areas of Katsina-Ala, Logo. and Ukum.)	78,424	69.47%	913	0.81%	32,519	28.80%	1,035	0.92%	112,891
Konshisha/Vandeikya Federal Constituency (Note: Comprising the local government areas of Konshisha and Vandeikya.)	60,783	58.11%	21,735	20.78%	18,893	18.06%	3,187	3.05%	104,598
Kwande/Ushongo Federal Constituency (Note: Comprising the local government areas of Kwande and Ushongo.)	31,946	74.89%	913	2.14%	8,879	20.82%	918	2.15%	42,656
Oju/Obi Federal Constituency (Note: Comprising the local government areas of Obi and Oju.)	27,142	59.44%	2,796	6.12%	15,078	33.02%	645	1.41%	45,661
Otukpo/Ohimini Federal Constituency (Note: Comprising the local government areas of Ohimini and Otukpo.)	26,663	50.64%	3,160	6.00%	19,619	37.27%	3,207	6.09%	52,649
Totals	473,933	62.61%	41,881	5.53%	223,913	29.58%	17,176	2.28%	756,903

==== By local government area ====
The results of the election by local government area.

LGA	Hyacinth Alia APC		Herman Hembe LP		Titus Uba PDP		Others		Total Valid Votes	Turnout Percentage
LGA	Votes	Percentage	Votes	Percentage	Votes	Percentage	Votes	Percentage	Total Valid Votes	Turnout Percentage
Ado	8,662	60.34%	308	2.15%	4,379	30.50%	1,006	7.01%	14,355	17.79%
Agatu	7,482	41.70%	216	1.20%	9,934	55.37%	311	1.73%	17,943	28.62%
Apa	7,925	47.97%	465	2.82%	7,806	47.25%	324	1.96%	16,520	25.49%
Buruku	34,713	75.57%	1,155	2.51%	9,513	20.71%	556	1.21%	45,937	35.78%
Gboko	53,985	71.68%	1,493	1.98%	18,773	24.93%	1,065	1.41%	75,316	30.68%
Guma	15,371	40.20%	535	1.40%	22,083	57.75%	250	0.65%	38,239	33.97%
Gwer East	20,083	59.77%	1,272	3.78%	12,085	35.97%	161	0.48%	33,601	33.97%
Gwer West	10,947	41.86%	1,509	5.77%	13,609	52.03%	90	0.34%	26,155	35.31%
Katsina-Ala	34,347	82.43%	178	0.43%	6,716	16.12%	428	1.02%	41,669	25.07%
Konshisha	13,997	32.47%	21,606	50.12%	5,905	13.70%	1,598	3.71%	43,106	33.30%
Kwande	No election held due to ballot paper error									
Logo	15,574	47.80%	296	0.91%	16,385	50.29%	327	1.00%	32,582	29.00%
Makurdi	56,432	75.68%	3,792	5.09%	12,329	16.53%	2,012	2.70%	74,565	24.84%
Obi	9,897	56.49%	1,185	6.77%	6,267	35.77%	170	0.97%	17,519	25.69%
Ogbadibo	7,627	48.14%	405	2.56%	6,032	38.07%	1,779	11.23%	15,843	22.49%
Ohimini	7,233	45.92%	973	6.18%	6,785	43.08%	760	4.83%	15,751	34.05%
Oju	17,245	61.28%	1,611	5.72%	8,811	31.31%	475	1.69%	28,142	25.94%
Okpokwu	9,326	48.31%	1,039	5.38%	8,634	44.73%	304	1.58%	19,303	25.57%
Otukpo	19,430	52.66%	2,187	5.93%	12,834	34.78%	2,447	6.63%	36,898	25.04%
Tarka	16,422	79.59%	175	0.85%	3,748	18.17%	287	1.39%	20,632	37.74%
Ukum	28,503	73.77%	439	1.14%	9,418	24.37%	280	0.72%	38,640	27.74%
Ushongo	31,946	74.89%	913	2.14%	8,879	20.82%	918	2.15%	42,656	36.70%
Vandeikya	46,786	76.09%	129	0.21%	12,988	21.12%	1,589	2.58%	61,492	37.87%
Totals	473,933	62.61%	41,881	5.53%	223,913	29.58%	17,176	2.28%	756,903	%

== See also ==
- 2023 Nigerian elections
- 2023 Nigerian gubernatorial elections
