= 2019 Benue State gubernatorial election =

2019 gubernatorial election in Benue State, Nigeria

- March 9, 2019
| Nominee | Samuel Ortom | Emmanuel Jime |
| Party | PDP | APC |
| Running mate | Benson Abounu | Samuel Ode |
| Popular vote | 434,473 | 345,155 |
Governor before election
Samuel Ortom
PDP
Elected Governor
Samuel Ortom
PDP

The 2019 Benue State gubernatorial election occurred on March 9, 2019. Incumbent PDP Governor Samuel Ortom won re-election for a second term, defeating APC Emmanuel Jime and several minor party candidates. Samuel Ortom emerged PDP gubernatorial candidate after scoring 2,210 votes and defeating his closest rival, John Tondo, who received 475 votes. He picked Benson Abounu as his running mate. Emmanuel Jime was the APC candidate with Samuel Ode as his running mate. 3 candidates contested in the election.

== Electoral system ==
The Governor of Benue is elected using the plurality voting system.

== Primary election ==
=== PDP primary ===
The PDP primary election was held on September 30, 2018. Samuel Ortom won the primary election polling 2,210 votes against three other candidates. His closest rival was John Tondo, a former commissioner for lands who came second with 475 votes, while Felix Atume, came third with 44 votes.

=== Candidates ===
- Party nominee: Samuel Ortom: Incumbent governor
- Running mate: Benson Abounu: Incumbent deputy governor
- John Tondo: Former commissioner for lands
- Felix Atume
- Paul Orhii

=== APC primary ===
The APC primary election was held on October 1, 2018. Emmanuel Jime emerged the consensus candidate, after four other aspirants stepped down for him. He picked Samuel Ode as his running mate.

== Results ==
A total number of 33 candidates registered with the Independent National Electoral Commission to contest in the election.

The total number of registered voters in the state was 2,471,894, while 858,947 voters were accredited. Total number of votes cast was 846,222, while number of valid votes was 830,954. Rejected votes were 15,268.

| Candidate | Party | Votes | % |
|---|---|---|---|
| Samuel Ortom | People's Democratic Party | 434,473 | 52.29 |
| Emmanuel Jime | All Progressives Congress | 345,155 | 41.54 |
| Other candidates | | 51,326 | 6.18 |
| Total | | 830,954 | 100.00 |
| Valid votes | | 830,954 | 98.20 |
| Invalid/blank votes | | 15,268 | 1.80 |
| Total votes | | 846,222 | 100.00 |
| Registered voters/turnout | | 2,471,894 | 34.23 |
Source: Yafri

=== By local government area ===
Here are the results of the election by local government area for the two major parties. The total valid votes of 830,954 represents the 33 political parties that participated in the election. Green represents LGAs won by Samuel Ortom. Blue represents LGAs won by Emmanuel Jime.

| LGA | Samuel Ortom PDP | | Emmanuel Jime APC | | Total votes |
| LGA | # | % | # | % | # |
|---|---|---|---|---|---|
| Oju | 13,330 | | 19,134 | | |
| Obi | 9,576 | | 10,247 | | |
| Gwer West | 14,856 | | 7,429 | | |
| Ogbadibo | 8,985 | | 9,259 | | |
| Gwer East | 19,596 | | 15,291 | | |
| Ushongo | 22,703 | | 14,683 | | |
| Ohimini | 7,577 | | 8,675 | | |
| Agatu | 10,079 | | 7,538 | | |
| Apa | 8,725 | | 8,636 | | |
| Otukpo | 13,153 | | 21,785 | | |
| Tarka | 3,177 | | 16,600 | | |
| Ukum | 23,156 | | 11,790 | | |
| Katsina-Ala | 17,980 | | 21,614 | | |
| Ado | 10,258 | | 10,135 | | |
| Guma | 29,693 | | 12,005 | | |
| Gboko | 38,241 | | 29,802 | | |
| Makurdi | 29,414 | | 36,517 | | |
| Logo | 30,803 | | 4,586 | | |
| Buruku | 29,656 | | 13,404 | | |
| Okpokwu | 11,957 | | 9,641 | | |
| Kwande | 29,241 | | 22,786 | | |
| Vandeikya | 27,725 | | 19,079 | | |
| Konshisha | 21,980 | | 13,802 | | |
| Totals | 434,473 | | 345,155 | | 830,954 |
