= Benue North-East senatorial district =

Senatorial district in Nigeria

Benue North-East senatorial district known as zone A within Benue State, Nigeria, covers seven local government areas which include Katsina-Ala, Logo, Ukum, Konshisha, Vandeikya, Kwande and Ushongo. There 84 electoral wards and 1,389 polling units as of 2019 election. The headquarter of Benue North-East senatorial district is Katsina-Ala. The current representative is Senator Emmanuel Udende.

== List of senators representing Benue North-East since independence ==
| Senator | Party | Year | Assembly |
|---|---|---|---|
| Suemo Chia | NPN | 1979 - 1983 | 1st |
| Iyorwuese Hagher | NPN | 1983 - 1983 | 2nd |
| Professor David Iornem | SDP | 1992 - 1993 | 3rd, |
| Daniel Saror | PDP | 1999 - 2007 | 4th, 5th |
| Joseph Akaagerger | PDP | 2007 - 2011 | 6th |
| Barnabas Gemade | PDP | 2011 - 2019 | 7th, 8th |
| Gabriel Suswam | PDP | 2019–2023 | 9th |
| Emmanuel Udende | APC | 2023–present | 10th |
