= Samuel Ode =

Nigerian lawyer and politician (born 1968)

His Excellency Samuel Ode

Deputy Governor of Benue State
- Incumbent
- Assumed office 29 May 2023
- Governor: Hyacinth Alia
- Preceded by: Benson Abounu

Minister of State in the Niger Delta Ministry

Personal details
- Born: Samuel Ode; 7 November 1968 (age 57) Gboko, Benue State
- Party: All Progressive Congress
- Spouse: Christie Sam-Ode
- Children: 6
- Education: Benue State Polytechnic; University of Jos; University of Johannesburg
- Occupation: Politician; lawyer
- Website: Campaign website

Samuel Ode (born 7 November 1968) is a Nigerian lawyer and politician who has served as the deputy governor of Benue State since 2023.

== Early life and education ==
Ode was born in Edikwu, Benue State, as the tenth out of fifteen children. His father, Christopher Ikwue Ode of Idoma descent, was a retired soldier and colonel in 1982, and the mother, Helen Mzamber of Tiv descent, was a trained nurse.

Ode began his education at NKST Primary School, Gboko from 1974 to 1980, and secondary at Wesley High School, Otukpo, where he received his General Certificate of Education in 1985. He further obtained a degree in law from Benue State Polytechnic in 1987. In 1993, he was admitted into the University of Jos, where he got his B.A. in Theatre Arts. In 2017, he did his yearly service at Nigerian Law School and was called to bar in 2019.

== Career ==
Ode was elected as the Benue state secretary of the National Democratic Party in 2002. In 2005, he was appointed as the Special Assistant to the Governor George Akume until he became the caretaker Chairman of Otukpo.

Ode was also appointed the special adviser on Local Government and Chieftain Affairs to the governor by Gabriel Suswam. He was later appointed by Goodluck Jonathan as the Minister of State of Niger Delta Affairs. He was also the Nigerian presidential liaison to Abdoulaye Wade, the then president of Senegal during the 39th ECOWAS summit for African Heads of State and Government.

He was a governorship candidate for the 2015 election in the state.

Ode is a fellow of the National Institute for Policy and Strategic Studies.

== Awards and honours ==
- 2023: Wesley University, Ondo state Honorary award

== Deputy governorship position ==
In 2018, Ode was selected for the deputy governorship of the running mate of the APC gubernatorial flag bearer, Barr. Emmanuel Jime in Benue State.

In 2022, he was a candidate for governorship in the primary which he lost as the runner up to Alia. He later was appointed the running mate of the APC candidate for governorship, Hyacinth Iormem Alia for the 2023 general election in Benue State. Although, the Zone C APC elders of Benue South Senatorial District rejected his declaration as the governorship elect and denied the nomination by issuing a statement rejecting the reported choice of Ode as the running mate of Fr Alia. In 2023, He was declared the deputy governor of Benue State and was sworn in in May, 2023.

== Personal life ==
Ode married Christie Sam-Ode (née Ada) and has eight children.

== Electoral controversy ==
Titus Uba, an aspirant of the Governor of Benue State for People's Democratic Party in 2023 alleged that Ode presented a manipulated certificate to INEC. He stated it was in opposition to the [Section 182(1)(j)] of the 1999 Constitution of the Federal Republic of Nigeria.

Titus also said that the running mate for governorship of Ode, Hyacinth Alia's name was presented less than 180 days before the election date, and that of Ode wasn't presented after the re-run of the primary election. However, all his petitions were dismissed with the reason according to Justice Ibrahim Karaye as "pre statute-barred."

In another ruling by Justice Onyekachi Aja Otisi, he said, "The appellant failed to prove the allegation of forgery beyond reasonable doubt."

== Other ventures ==
He is also the chairman of the organising committee of Benue International Investment Summit. He had also served as the Chairman of Upper Niger River Basin Development Authority.

Party political offices
Preceded by	APC nominee for Deputy Governor of Benue State; 2023	Succeeded by Incumbent
Preceded by Benson Abounu	Deputy Governor of Benue State; 2023	Incumbent
