= 2007 Benue State gubernatorial election =

Election to determine the governor of Benue State, Nigeria

- 14 April 2007
Nominee	Gabriel Suswam	Daniel Saror
Party	PDP	ANPP
Popular vote	1,086,489	276,618
Governor before election
George Akume
PDP
Elected Governor
Gabriel Suswam
PDP

The 2007 Benue State gubernatorial election was the sixth gubernatorial election of Benue State. Held on 14 April 2007, the People's Democratic Party nominee Gabriel Suswam won the election, defeating Daniel Saror of the All Nigeria Peoples Party.

== Results ==
Gabriel Suswam from the People's Democratic Party won the election, defeating Daniel Saror from the All Nigeria Peoples Party. Registered voters was 2,150,515.

2007 Benue State gubernatorial election
Party	Candidate	Votes	%	±%
PDP	Gabriel Suswam	1,086,489		
ANPP	Daniel Saror	276,618		
PDP hold				
