= Joseph Akaagerger =

Nigerian politician (1956–2025)

Joseph Iorshagher Akaagerger

Military Administrator of Katsina State
- In office August 1998 – May 1999
- Preceded by: Samaila Bature Chamah
- Succeeded by: Umaru Musa Yar'Adua

Senator of the Federal Republic of Nigeria from Benue North-East Senatorial District
- In office 29 May 2007 – 29 May 2011
- Preceded by: Daniel Saror
- Succeeded by: Barnabas Andyar Gemade

Personal details
- Born: 5 May 1956 Konshisha, Federation of Nigeria
- Died: 15 May 2025 (aged 69)
- Party: People's Democratic Party
- Education: Nigerian Defence Academy; RMA Sandhurst; University of Jos; Ahmadu Bello University

Military service
- Allegiance: Nigeria
- Branch: Nigerian Army
- Rank: Colonel

Colonel Joseph Iorshagher Akaagerger (5 May 1956 – 15 May 2025) was a Nigerian politician who was the Military Administrator of Katsina State, from August 1998 to 29 May 1999. After the return to democracy, in April 2007, he was elected to the Senate representing Benue North East.

== Background ==
Akaagerger was born on 5 May 1956 in Konshisha local government area, now in Benue State, of Tiv origins. He attended Government Secondary School, Gboko (1969–1973). Joining the army, he attended the Nigerian Defence Academy, Kaduna (1976–1977), the Royal Military Academy Sandhurst, United Kingdom (1977–1979). He also obtained LLB and LLM degrees from the University of Jos and a doctorate degree in International Economic Law from the Ahmadu Bello University, Zaria. He held the traditional title of Ambe u Konshisha (the Konshisha Crocodile). He was a kinsman of former Attorney-General and Justice Minister Michael Aondoakaa.

== Military career ==
Akaagerger held various posts in the army, rising to the rank of Lt. Colonel. He was on the Directing Staff at the Command and Staff College, Zaria when he was appointed Military Administrator of Katsina State during the transitional regime of General Abdulsalami Abubakar in August 1998. He was said to have provided state funding for the successful Katsina governorship campaign of Umaru Musa Yar'Adua (later to become president), who took office at the start of the Nigerian Fourth Republic in May 1999. After the handover it was found that the state had a liability of ₦35 million from the ministries, ₦174 million from the parastatals and an overdraft from Bank of the North in the region of ₦75 million, as well as other debts. Following the return to democracy, as a former military administrator he was required to retire from the army.

== Senator ==
Akaagerger joined the United Nigeria Peoples Party (UNPP). In the 2003 elections, he was UNPP candidate for election to the Senate in Benue State for the Benue North East constituency, but was not elected. In June 2004 he crossed over to the People's Democratic Party (PDP). In the 2007 elections he ran again for Benue NE, this time on the PDP platform. In the primaries, he did not obtain the required 2/3 majority, but was elected as candidate on a straight majority, as was Senator David Mark in the Benue South senatorial zone. Unongo gave him his support, and he was elected, taking office in May 2007. In January 2008, an election petition tribunal in Makurdi nullified his election on the basis that there had been enormous allocations of votes, as opposed to actual voting, and ordered fresh elections to be held. He appealed the judgement. In February 2008, Akaagerger was named Publicity Secretary for the Northern Senators Forum.

Akaagerger made provision of health care his priority. In December 2008, he stated that his free medical scheme in the state, which was being executed in partnership with the Grassroots Doctors Society, had spent ₦50 million and had benefited 23,000 people. In October 2009, he raised the alarm over the Lake Nyos natural dam, located in the Cameroons, which empties into the Benue River. The lake sits on a magma chamber and is saturated with CO_{2}, which has erupted in the past. The dam wall has been weakening, and a seismic event could cause a disaster in downstream Nigeria. Akaagerger called for precautions including speeding up work on the Kashimbilla buffer dam project.

In May 2009, Akaagerger and nine other senators were referred to the Committee on Ethics, Privileges and Public Petitions for investigation in regards to a controversial expenses-paid trip to Ghana. In July 2009, a Senate Committee named ex-directors of 13 failed banks as being involved in credit abuse which had led to the banks' failure. Akaagerger was opposed to making the names public, since they included the chairmen of boards of some federal government agencies. A list issued in October 2009 by the Central Bank of Nigeria of non-performing loans in five banks that had to be bailed out showed that Akaagerger was indebted by ₦534 million to Spring Bank Plc. In a March 2010 interview Akaagerger expressed optimism that the proposed electoral reforms would be resolved before the 2011 elections.

== Later career ==
In January 2011, former PDP National Chairman Barnabas Gemade defeated Akaagerger and others to become the PDP candidate for Senate in Benue North East. In March 2011, Akaagerger said change had become necessary. If the Action Congress of Nigeria (ACN) was voted into power, Audu Ogbeh would develop Benue and would stem the rubbish inflicted by the PDP in the last four years. In October 2014, Akaagerger was among the PDP elders of Benue North-East senatorial District who supported Governor Gabriel Suswam for the 2015 senatorial race. In May 2015, Akaagerger was among leaders of the six states of the north central zone who pushed for the candidature of George Akume as Senate President.

== Death ==
Akaagerger died on 15 May 2025, at the age of 69.

== See also ==
- List of governors of Katsina State
