= Dickson Tarkighir =

Nigerian politician (born 1969)

Dickson Dominic Tarkighir

Member of the House of Representatives of Nigeria representing Makurdi/Guma Federal Constituency
- In office 2015–2018
- Preceded by: Emmanuel Jime
- Succeeded by: Benjamin Bem Mzondu
- Incumbent
- Assumed office 2023
- Preceded by: Benjamin Bem Mzondu

Personal details
- Born: 12 April 1969 (age 57) Makurdi, Benue State, Nigeria
- Party: All Progressives Congress (APC)
- Education: Ambrose Alli University, Ekpoma; Ahmadu Bello University, Zaria
- Occupation: Legislator
- Profession: Marketing consultant, politician

Dickson Dominic Tarkighir (born 12 April 1969) is a Nigerian politician. He is a member of the 10th Nigeria National Assembly of the Nigerian House of Representatives representing Makurdi/Guma Federal Constituency. He was also a member of the 8th National Assembly and a member of the ECOWAS parliament.

== Early life and education ==
Dickson Tarkighir was born into the family of Mr and Mrs Tarkighir Ubur Adaga. He attended St. Thomas Primary School Ibume, Makurdi Local Government Area from 1976 to 1981 where he obtained his First School Leaving Certificate (FSLC).

He proceeded to Nongov Community Secondary School, Tse-Kyo, Guma Local Government Area, where he graduated in 1986 with a Senior Secondary School Certificate.

After a break in his educational pursuit, he was admitted to Edo State University, now Ambrose Alli University, Ekpoma, where he studied between 1998 and 2003 and graduated with a Bachelor's degree in Business Administration.

He later gained admission to Ahmadu Bello University, Zaria, and graduated with a Master of Business Administration (MBA), in 2008.

== Work and employment ==
Dickson Tarkighir is a marketing consultant. From 1988 to 1991, he served as an apprentice at Mojo Electronics, Umuahia. Between 1992 and 1995, he worked with Okada Air, Kaduna.

Later, he went into private business and established Dasnett Mobile Services during the advent of GSM services in Nigeria. He was the MD/CEO, Triggar and Gibbons Ltd, an advertising agency and logistics support service company and District 4 Lounge, a relaxation outfit in Makurdi, Benue state.

== Political career ==
Dickson Tarkighir was a member of the People's Democratic Party (PDP). He worked for the victory of the party at all levels which earned him the appointment of Senior Special Assistant on Industries to the Governor of Benue State in 2009. He was re-appointed into the same position in 2011; a position he held until 2014 when he resigned to run for a seat in the National Assembly.

He sought for the ticket of the People's Democratic Party to contest at the polls but lost to John Tondo, in a primary election described as unfair. He left the PDP for the All Progressives Congress (APC) where he secured the ticket to contest at the polls in the 2015 general elections and won the seat to represent the people of Makurdi/Guma Federal Constituency in the House of Representatives, Abuja.

On Tuesday, 24 July 2018, Tarkighir was among 37 members of the House of Representatives who defected from the ruling All Progressives Congress (APC) to other political parties. He defected to the People's Democratic Party (PDP), a party he had previously defected from.

However, On Tuesday, 22 January 2019, Tarkighir announced his return to the All Progressives Congress (APC) saying "efforts by the Federal Government to restore peace and order to his constituency had pacified him and his people." Dickson Tarkighir had earlier left the APC after being "aggrieved with the President Muhammadu Buhari-led administration over how the farmers/herdsmen crisis was being handled."

=== Litigation ===
Dickson Tarkighir was the nominee of the All Progressives Congress, to replace the candidature of Bulaun Peter who won the initial primary election and was issued a certificate of return by the party and recognized by the Independent National Electoral Commission (INEC), but had passed on.

One Franc Fagah Utoo went to court to challenge his candidature, citing irregularities in his nomination process. "Utoo claimed that he won the party's primary election but that Tarkighir's name was submitted to the Independent National Electoral Commission."

The case went through the High Court, Appeal Court and Supreme Courts, with Tarkighir's nomination being upheld by the highest court in Nigeria.

== Legislative activities ==
Dickson Tarkighir was an outspoken voice in the 8th National Assembly of the House of Representatives. He is an advocate of the independence of the legislature and a defender of the institution. He has always stood by the decisions of the House irrespective of his personal and partisan political views. During the electioneering of the Speaker of the 8th Assembly, Tarkighir supported the candidate of his party, the All Progressives Congress (APC), Femi Gbajabiamila, who lost to Yakubu Dogara. Amidst the furore that followed the loss of Gbajabiamila, he stood with the outcome of the election.

After the passage of the 2017 budget, there was public outcry over the increase of the National Assembly budget from N115bn in 2016 to 125bn, at a time the nation was struggling to recover from economic recession. In the proposed budget, the sum of N125bn was appropriated for both chambers of the 8th Assembly, the figure which represents about 2% of the total budget of the federation. Tarkighir, however, explained why the budget was jacked up by N10bn.

According to him, the present economic realities and the subsequent increase in the foreign exchange had drastically affected the operations of the National Assembly. "The cost of dollar virtually affects all facets of life. Almost everything we do here, we have to exchange naira for dollars. We import papers from abroad, including the ones we used to produce the budget you are holding. Now, we can’t even buy operational vehicles because there is no money."

He said there were oversight functions that lawmakers also attend outside the country. "We just arrived the country, last week, from an Offshore Technology Conference. You wouldn't believe that, with the current exchange rate, this budget is less than N100bn, you are just seeing the figures on the surface."

"The budget was actually N150bn in the 7th Assembly, but it took patriotic efforts of the leadership and members of the 8th Assembly to reduce it to what it is now. When we saw the economic situation then, we resolved amongst ourselves to make sacrifices for the country, so we reduced the budget from N150bn. But as you can see, it is no longer possible, due to increase in dollars. We can no longer sustain that figure. Even when the budget was N150bn, the exchange rate was 199 naira to a dollar, today, the official exchange rate is 305, but you can’t get it. You need to buy at the black market at high rate", he added.

During another interview, Tarkighir also stated, "I have aimed my legislation at issues affecting my country men and my constituents. I have raised a motion asking that the Federal Government replaces the 25,000 ghost workers it discovered, with actual job seekers since the Government has shown capability over time to remunerate such work force. This number, shared by and drawn from the 36 states of the Federation and Abuja, would help ease the high level of unemployment a bit."

=== Committee memberships ===
Tarkighir was a member of about 10 committees,

- Appropriation
- Defense
- Petroleum Downstream
- Population
- Navy
- Health Services
- Niger Delta Affairs
- Inter Parliamentary
- Integration in Africa
- ECOWAS Parliament

=== Bills sponsored ===
Tarkighir sponsored several bills. They include:

1. A Bill for an Act to create a Department of Cattle Ranches under the Federal Ministry of Agriculture or any such Ministry Overseeing the Production and Rearing of Cattle; and for Other Matters Related Thereto, 2015 (HB 323).
2. A bill for an act to amend the National Primary Health Care Development Agency Act (1992) and to repeal the National Programme on Immunization Act (1997.
3. A bill for an act to amend the Information Technology Development Agency Act 2007 to vest in the agency, more functions to enhance internet security and more powers to set, coordinate and regulate minimum e-governance standards in all federal government ministries, departments and agencies and for other matters thereto, 2015.
4. A bill for an act to amend the National Health Bill 2014 to include free and compulsory periodic medical test for prevalent and chronic ailments or conditions on all persons living in Nigeria and for other matters thereto.
5. Hydroelectric Power Producing Areas Development Commission (establishment, etc.) (amendment) bill, 2016.
6. A bill for an act to repeal the National Programme on Immunization Act Cap. N71 laws of the federation of Nigeria, 2004, to remove the replication of functions between National Primary Healthcare Development Agency and National Programme on Immunization and for related matters.
7. A bill for an act to amend the National Tobacco Control Act, 2015 and vest the implementation and exercise of this act with the National Agency for Food and Drug and Administration and Control and for other matters related thereto, 2016 (HB.882).
8. A Bill for an act to Amend the National Agency for Food and Drug Administration and Control Act, Cap. N1, Laws of the Federation of Nigeria, 2004 to Create a Directorate of National Tobacco Control and for Other Related Matters (HB.883).
9. A bill for an act to provide special benefits to electricity consumers who make financial contribution to electricity companies towards the procurement, installation and maintenance of electricity distribution transformers or other related equipment and for related matters, 2017.

=== Motions ===
Tarkighir moved several motions on the floor of the House; these include:

1. Motion on the tragedy of flood disaster in Makurdi and several parts of the country.
2. Motion to replace 23,000 ghost workers with actual workers from the pool of unemployed and qualified Nigerian job seekers.
3. A motion calling on FERMA to urgently mobilize resources towards the rehabilitation of the Makurdi – Gboko federal highway.
4. A motion calling on NEMA and other relevant agencies to put in place an enabling environment for a swift and decisive response to the anticipated flooding of parts of Benue State and especially for adequate care and attention to IDPs currently housed within the International Market in Makurdi and an overall review of emergency preparedness and disaster management framework to enhance speed and efficiency in the primary mandate of the agencies concerned.
5. Motion towards decentralising the voter registration exercise by the Independent National Electoral Commission (INEC).
6. Motion on herdsmen killings in Guma and Logo Local Government areas of Benue State and the alarming humanitarian situation that has arisen.
7. Need for the Federal Government to Declare a State of Emergency on Security over Spate of Deadly Attacks in the Country by Suspected Herdsmen.

=== Constituency projects ===
Dickson Tarkighir has to his credit several constituency projects in Makurdi-Guma Federal Constituency. Some of the projects include:

- Solar powered street light at Abinsi Town, Guma Local Govt Area, Benue State.
- Provision of 5 NOS 300KVA transformers in Makurdi LGA, Benue State.
- Construction of Solar Borehole at Ter Guma Street, North Bank, Makurdi LGA- Benue State.
- Construction of Skills Acquisition Centre (Type A) at High Level, Makurdi LGA- Benue State.
- Construction of Abinsi Township roads, Guma LGA, Benue State.
- Youth Empowerment Scheme: Sewing machines, cassava processing machines, Grinding machines, computer laptops, farm spraying machines, welding machines, water pumping machines in Makurdi LGA, Benue State.
- Training of market participants the use of trading system in Makurdi/Guma Federal Constituency of Benue State.
- Construction of Town Hall at Abinsi, Guma LGA, Benue State.
- Empowerment for women and youths: Tricycles, motorbikes, grinding machines, sewing machines at Makurdi/Guma Federal Constituency, Benue State.
- Health medical outreach: HIV Awareness campaign/free medical outreach at Makurdi/Guma Federal Constituency, Benue State.
- Completion of Akaakuma Dam in Guma LGA-Benue State.
- Construction of LGEA Primary School Ngban, Nyiev, Guma LGA- Benue State.
- Purchase of motorcycles for rural community intervention in Makurdi/Guma Federal Constituency of Benue State.
- Solar boreholes at Abinsi, Guma LGA, Benue State.
- Building of the Divisional Police Officer's (D.P.O) Quarters in Gbajimba, Headquarters, Guma Local Government Area, Benue State.

== Response to Fulani herders attack ==
'Violence between Fulani herdsmen and farmers is one of Nigeria's most persistent security problems and has left thousands of people dead in recent decades. The International Crisis Group think tank has warned it could become “as potentially dangerous as the Boko Haram insurgency in the northeast”'

Dickson Tarkighir was one of the most steadfast voices against the Fulani Herder's attacks which has affected various parts of Nigeria and his primary constituency, Makurdi/Guma Federal Constituency, greatly.

On 1 January 2018, Fulani Herders attacked Guma and Logo LGA and killed about 73 persons, including women and children. A mass burial for the victims was organized by the government of Benue State on 11 January 2018.

Reacting to the continued attacks on ChannelsTV's programme, Sunrise Daily on Monday, 8 January 2018, the lawmaker expressed displeasure over President Buhari's failure to "name and shame" Fulani herdsmen despite the attacks on Nigerians in Benue state. He said that until the herdsmen are tagged as terrorists, the activities of security agencies in the area may not yield the desired results.

He expressed fears that with the current attacks on Benue communities, the nation may not attain its goal of becoming food sufficiency. "The federal government has been advocating for food security but how do you have food security when every time we want to harvest our produce, the Fulanis attack us?

Despite being a member of the All Progressives Congress as President Muhammadu Buhari, he has continued to lambast and challenge the president over the issue of the Fulani herdsmen attacks. In an interview with The Daily Independent, he asserted, "we elected this government because in 2012, 2013 and 2014, this state was under attack by the Fulani herdsmen. Our people were refugees in their own land. The then President Goodluck Jonathan did nothing about it. So, we decided that we should change the leadership; hence President Buhari won Benue State. When Buhari came in, we thought that as a Fulani, an elder statesman and a former Head of State, he understood the challenges that our people face and would bring the farmers and herders’ clashes to an end. Unfortunately, the crisis escalated under his administration."

In an interview with The Guardian, he stated: "The President has not done much. People are beginning to think that his Presidency has emboldened herdsmen to attack communities across this country because he is a Fulani. As a Fulani who also owns cattle himself, the President is supposed to lead by example. He declared in his form at the Code of Conduct that he has cattle. Let him show cattle rearers where his ranch is and that this is the best practice to graze cattle. If he can ranch his own cattle, that is the more reason why he should preach the idea of ranching and ensure that those who cannot afford ranch are given incentives to set up ranch to grow their cattle. People are very anxious about the creation of grazing routes because they think that their lands would be confiscated and given to herdsman. Since the government is practically saying nothing to protect Nigerians, we think that indirectly he is giving the go-ahead to destroy communities for their herds to feed."

He continued: “In faraway China, the President sent a clear message to pipelines vandals that he is going to treat them like Boko Haram. Pipelines vandals don’t kill people; they vandalize pipelines. Herdsmen kill people, destroy lands and properties and crops in our communities. They have killed over 8,000 people since Buhari came to power. The herdsmen are a huge security threat to this country. The President has provided military men to protect cattle breeders in Kano and Katsina from rustlers, but he has not provided the same military to deal with herders who kill people, particularly in the North Central zone. How is that fair?”

According to Tarkighir, "the Myetti Allah people had been threatening for the past six to seven months after the Anti-Open Grazing Bill was signed into law, that they would not allow it to be implemented. They made public statements on TV, in national dailies and international networks. These people are known, but the security agencies have not been able to arrest these people and prosecute them. When you threaten people with death and they eventually die, you are responsible. These people have not been arrested, which is why I say that those attacking us are known by government. Unfortunately, government is doing nothing about it. So, our people feel that there is collusion between the Federal Government and herdsmen. Look at Guma LG, it is about 40-minutes-drive from Makurdi. Three military assets are in Makurdi; you have the 72 Brigade, NASME, and the Air Force Base that can be deployed to Guma in less than 20 minutes. It took three days for the military to be deployed to Guma LG. What does that tell you? It tells you that they don't care about the lives and properties that are being destroyed in Guma or in Benue. That is so unfortunate and we are disappointed with the president."

In another interview with This Day, Tarkighir said; "my people have lost faith in the federal government's willingness to protect them, because even as the Exercise Cat Race was going on, the killings and the burning continued. They were killing policemen and even military personnel.

"We think that there is collusion between the government and the herdsmen on what is happening, because as I speak, now almost everybody in Guma local government which is my own local government, is a refugee. The land is desolate, it is empty as there is nobody there. The farming season is coming and people have no access to their farmlands, which means that beside creating poverty, there is going to be hunger in Benue come next season."

He also appealed for support: "We are now appealing to the international community to come to our aid. We have over 190,000 men, women and children in IDP camps, and there is no food, there is nothing. The state government’s resources are overstretched, as regards the provision of medical needs, foods, clothing and infrastructures for camps. So far, we have about eight camps and the responsibility of taking care of these people is that of the state government."

== Controversy ==
In 2016, there were reports in the media that a total of 45 federal lawmakers who got elected during the 2015 general elections to represent their various constituencies across the country were inaugurated into both chambers of the National Assembly with either Secondary School Certificates or Grade-II Teachers’ Certificates as their highest educational qualification.

Among the persons named to have reportedly got elected into the office with O’Level result was Dickson Tarkighir.

However, Tarkighir's response was that the report was the writer's figment of imagination. In an interview with Daily Post, he said:

"Earlier in the week, a friend and former course mate with whom we graduated in 2008 having completed our studies for MBA from Ahamdu Bello University Zaria, called with the news that my name was amongst those who are said to be at the National Assembly having no more than the barest minimum academic qualification which is a GCE. We laughed it off and I laughed even harder when I eventually read the full report and saw the other names on the list – some of which names are not members of the House of Representatives even as the report alluded to their membership. Others who were University lecturers prior to their sojourn in politics also managed to make the list. I took it for granted that any reader could tell the folly that is the report having noticed the obvious shoddy nature of its claims. But it was not until I read online reactions to the report that it dawned on me how many people, out of mischief, took hook, line and sinker, the said report and went ahead to make a mockery of the institution and each one of us. For the sake of my constituents, friends and well-wishers, I am compelled to state (again) my academic qualifications. I do so in spite of being initially reticent about it because, I do not see myself or any other member as a better Rep than any of our colleagues whose academic qualifications might just be the barest minimum. It’s not nearly a factor in considering who has been or will be a better representative. I however, have a duty to correct a mischievous profiling of myself by a journalist who distorts a portion of my resume and goes to press with a scant remainder of it. The fact is that, in addition to my GCE, I graduated from Ambrose Alli University, Ekpoma in 2003. I read the Business Administration. And in case this needs some confirming with the University, here is my Certificate number FD. 045729. In 2006/2007 academic session, I enrolled for a Masters Degree in Business Administration (MBA) at the Ahmadu Bello University, Zaria and graduated in 2008. For checks with the University: MBA/ADMIN/00905/06-07 suffices. More importantly, I like to reassure my constituents, friends and well-wishers that I am eminently qualified for the privileged mandate I hold and exercise on behalf of my constituency of Makurdi/Guma."
