= Terkimbi Ikyange =

Former Speaker of Benue State House of Assembly

Speaker of the Benue State House of Assembly
- In office 2015 – 27 July 2018
- Preceded by: Emmanuel Teryila Ayua
- Succeeded by: Titus Uba

Personal details
- Party: All Progressives Congress
- Occupation: Politician

Terkimbi Ikyange is a Nigerian politician who was elected speaker of the 8th session of the Benue State House of Assembly in 2015 on the platform of All Progressives Congress, APC. He was impeached in 2018.

== Impeachment ==
In 2016 Ikyange came under pressure to resign from his position as speaker following his refusal to restore the seat of Mbagwa State constituency in Ushongo Local Government Area in the State Assembly. This prompted Nigerian Senate to pass a resolution mandating Independent National Electoral Commission (INEC) to conduct a fresh election for Mbagwa State Constituency. Ikyange rejected the motion arguing that only a court of competent jurisdiction could make such order. On 11 July 2018, Ikyange survived an impeachment attempt in the State Assembly.

On 27 July 2018, another impeachment process against Ikyange was started with a motion of no confidence moved by Richard Ujege of the APC representing Konshisha State Constituency and was promptly seconded by Anthony Ogbu of the APC representing Ado State Constituency. Twenty-one out of the 30 members State Assembly swiftly supported the vote of no confidence and Ikyange was subsequently impeached in absentia but the Clerk of the house witnessed the impeachment. Members of the house said they had given Ikyange red card for his ‘highhanded’. Following the impeachment Ikyange was suspended from the house for six months. Titus Uba was swiftly elected speaker
