= 2011 Benue State gubernatorial election =

State election in Nigeria

- 26 April 2011
Nominee	Gabriel Suswam	Steven Ugbah
Party	PDP	ACN
Popular vote	590,756	499,319
Governor before election
Gabriel Suswam
PDP
Elected Governor
Gabriel Suswam
PDP

The 2011 Benue State gubernatorial election was the seventh gubernatorial election of Benue State. Held on 26 April 2011, the People's Democratic Party nominee Gabriel Suswam won the election, defeating Steven Ugbah of the Action Congress of Nigeria.

== Results ==
A total of 13 candidates contested in the election. Gabriel Suswam from the People's Democratic Party won the election, defeating Steven Ugbah from the Action Congress of Nigeria. Valid votes was 1,110,606.

2011 Benue State gubernatorial election
Party	Candidate	Votes	%	±%
PDP	Gabriel Suswam	590,756	50.55	
ACN	Steven Ugbah	499,319	42.84	
PDP hold				
