= 2015 Nigerian Senate elections in Benue State =

2015 Nigerian Senate election in Benue State

The 2015 Nigerian Senate election in Benue State was held on March 28, 2015, to elect members of the Nigerian Senate to represent Benue State. Barnabas Andyar Gemade representing Benue North East and George Akume representing Benue North West won on the platform of All Progressives Congress, while David Mark representing Benue South won on the platform of Peoples Democratic Party.

== Overview ==
Affiliation	Party		Total
Affiliation	APC	PDP	Total
Before Election			3
After Election	2	1	3

== Summary ==
District	Incumbent	Party	Elected Senator	Party
Benue North East			Barnabas Andyar Gemade	APC
Benue North West			George Akume	APC
Benue South			David Mark	PDP

== Results ==
=== Benue North East ===
All Progressives Congress candidate Barnabas Andyar Gemade won the election, defeating People's Democratic Party candidate Gabriel Suswam and other party candidates.

2015 Nigerian Senate election in Benue State
Party	Candidate	Votes	%
APC	Barnabas Andyar Gemade		
PDP	Gabriel Suswam		
Total votes			
APC hold			

=== Benue North West ===
All Progressives Congress candidate George Akume won the election, defeating People's Democratic Party candidate Mike Mku and other party candidates.

2015 Nigerian Senate election in Benue State
Party	Candidate	Votes	%
APC	George Akume		
PDP	Mike Mku		
Total votes			
APC hold			

=== Benue South ===
Peoples Democratic Party candidate David Mark won the election, defeating All Progressives Congress candidate Daniel Onjeh and other party candidates.

2015 Nigerian Senate election in Benue State
Party	Candidate	Votes	%
PDP	David Mark		
APC	Daniel Onjeh		
Total votes			
PDP hold			
