= Benson Abounu =

Nigerian politician

Benson Abounu (born 3 July 1949) is a Nigerian politician who served as the Deputy Governor of Benue State, Nigeria from 29 May 2015 to 29 May 2023. He was elected as the running mate to Governor Samuel L. Ortom in 2015 under the All Progressive Congress (APC). He is an engineer, a management consultant and a politician.

== Life ==
Abounu was born on 3 July 1949 in Otukpo in Benue State. He is an engineer, an administrator and a politician. He is married to Mary Abounu, a High court judge in the Benue State Judiciary, and has five children.

== Education ==
He attended the Methodist Primary School Upu-Icho in Otukpo, his birthplace, from 1957 to 1963. He proceeded to Government College, Makurdi, where he had a brief stint, between 1964 and 1966. Engr. Abounu transferred to Government Technical College, Ilorin in 1967 and completed the O’levels in 1969.

From 1971 to 1975, he studied at the Kaduna Polytechnic, Kaduna, before leaving for the United Kingdom, where he attended the Cranfield University, Bedford, England, between 1976 and 1978. Between 1980 and 1984 he was at the University of Ibadan before proceeding to the Ashridge Management College in England for postgraduate studies in 1989.

From these academic pursuits, Abounu obtained diploma in electrical/mechanical engineering and higher national diploma in mechanical engineering; Master of Science in industrial engineering and administration as well as Master of Business Administration (MBA) finance and operations management.

== Career ==
From 1975 to 1976 he worked with John Holt Group, then for Nigeria Breweries, Lagos as technical manager from 1979 to 1980, at the Okin Bottling Company Ltd, Kaduna, as general manager from 1982 to 1988, and as director, NAL Merchant Bank PLC, Lagos, between 1986 and 1990, at the end of which he became principal partner, Abounu Benson and Company, chartered engineers and management consultants.

In early 1990, Abounu was appointed sole administrator and chief executive officer of the Nigerian Mining Corporation, Jos, from where he moved to become an executive director at the Nigeria Coal Corporation, Enugu, between late 1990 and 1991. He came to public limelight in Benue State when he contested for governor on the platform of the Social Democratic Party, SDP, and thereafter served as special adviser to Governor Moses Adasu from 1992 to 1993.

Abounu was appointed commissioner for water resources and environment by Governor George Akume in 1999; re-appointed and assigned to the Ministry of Solid Minerals, where he served from August 2003 to June 2005. He chaired the board of the Nigerian Television Authority between 2009 and 2011.

Abounu contested the 2015 general elections as running mate to the All Progressives Congress gubernatorial candidate for Benue State, Chief Dr Samuel Ortom successfully. Consequently, He was inaugurated as the deputy governor of Benue State on 29 May 2015. In 2018 he moved with Governor Ortom to the Peoples Democratic Party (PDP) and both were reelected in March 2019. He was succeeded by Samuel Ode at the 2023 Benue State gubernatorial election.
