= Margaret Icheen =

Hon Margaret Icheen
- Born: 26 June 1957 (age 69); Vandeikya Local Government Area
- Other name: Mwuese
- Education: University of Calabar, institute of Christian Studies, Mkar, College of Education Katsina-Ala Government Teachers College, Keffi, St. Williams Primary School, Keffi
- Political party: People's Democratic Party
- Other political affiliations: Social Democratic Party (SDP)

Margaret Icheen (born 26 June 1957) is a politician, an educationist and administrator, she was the first female speaker of a state House of Assembly in Nigeria and in Africa, Delegate to the National Political Reform Conference (CONFAB), Chairman Benue Football Association, Federal Character Commissioner, The Executive member of the Nigerian Football Federation (NFF).

== Early life and education ==
Icheen was born on 26 June 1957 in Kwande Local Government Area of Benue State, Nigeria. She attended two primary schools, Our lady of Apostles Primary School Kaduna 1963 to 1965 and St Williams Primary School Keffi, 1966 to 1969, her secondary school at Gye Commercial College in Jos from 1970 to 1974. She then proceeded to Government Teachers College, Keffi, between 1975 and 1977. She furthered her education at the College of Education, Katsina-Ala, (An Affiliate of the University of Jos), from 1982 to 1985, to University of Calabar, and to the Institute of Christian Studies, Mkar from 1988- to 1990.

== Career ==
Icheen started her career as a teacher in a Primary School, at the Local Government Education Authority, LGEA, Adikpo from 1977 to 1981, and later became the Pay Mistress of the said school. She was also a Principal at the Women Education Centre until 1993.

== Political career ==
Her Political career started in 1994 as the chairman (Ward Delegate) National Constitutional Conference in Adikpo under the Social Democratic Party (SDP). Going further Icheen won the seat of Member Benue State House of Assembly 1993. She was the first woman to be elected as a speaker and in the house of Assembly in Benue state under the umbrella of People's Democratic Party (PDP) in fourth republic. In 2003 She resigned from her role as the Speaker of the Benue State House of Assembly. She was a Member of the Benue State Constitution Electoral Review Committee, North Central Speakers Forum, and also the National Coordinator, North Central/FCT, Women Participation in Politics in 2002.

== Paper presentation ==
As an edutionist, icheen National Union of Teachers, NUT. Icheen also attended both National and International conferences to represent Nigeria and PDP. Her first conference was the Benue State Delegate to the National Political Reform Conference in 2005. She was a Participant at the Commonwealth Parliamentary AssociationConferences held in Westminster, Abbey, London, The African-Caribbean and Pacific Countries Conference held in Abuja, National Assembly Workshop on Espirit DeCorps and Strategies in Legislative Governance, all in 2000. Others were: Women in Leadership Training, San Francisco, USA, African Parliamentary Conference and UNICEF Mission in Nouakchott, Mauritania, United States Orientation and Networking Trip of the Legislative Strengthening Programme in Jackson, Mississippi, USA, in 2001.

== Awards ==
1. John F. Kennedy, Fellow Doctorate Award
2. African-American International Research Institute, Kennedy University College, USA.
3. International Woman of the Year 2000, by the United Kingdom Human Rights Organization.
4. Ambassador for PeaceAward, Inter-religious and International Federation for World Peace.
5. WinningTeam Certificate of Excellence in Leadership by PDP
6. Women of Honour Award, Apples of Gold International.
7. Merit Award for Outstanding performance in Politics.
8. Club Recognition, by Rotary International Club of Makurdi.
9. Excellent Award in Leadership by National Association of Women Journalists, NAWOJ.
10. Justice of Knowledge, by Faculty of Law, BenueState University, Makurdi.
11. Sheroes Award in sport
