= Aondona Dajoh Hyacinth =

Nigerian politician

State Representative
- Constituency: Gboko West

Personal details
- Occupation: Politician

Aondona Dajoh Hyacinth is a Nigerian politician. He currently serve as a member representing Gboko West in the Benue State House of Assembly in the 10th assembly. He was inaugurated as Speaker of the house on the 5th of June 2023.
