= Akoh =

Nigerian given name

- Language: Igala

Origin
- Origin: Igala
- Meaning: "writer or intelligent person"
- Region of origin: North Central Nigeria

Akoh is a Nigerian surname of Igala origin which means "writer or intelligent person". The name is predominantly found in the North Central region of Nigeria.

== Notable people with the surname ==
- Jeff Akoh (born 1996) Nigerian singer.
- Dickson Akoh (born 1973) Founder and National Commandant of Peace Corps of Nigeria.
