= Herman Hembe =

Nigerian politician

Member of the House of Representatives
- In office 2011–2019
- Succeeded by: Peter Uche
- Constituency: Vandeikya/Konshisha Federal Constituency

Personal details
- Born: Herman Iorwase Hembe; June 22, 1975 (age 51) Zaria, Kaduna State, Nigeria
- Occupation: Politician, lawyer
- Profession: Lawyer

Herman Iorwase Hembe (born 22 June 1975) is a Nigerian politician and lawyer from Konshisha local government area of Benue State in north central Nigeria who serves as a member of the 9th Assembly in the House of Representatives of Nigeria where he represents Vandeikya/Konshisha Federal Constituency. Hembe is the flagbearer of the Labour party in the 2023 Benue governorship election, having previously contested unsuccessfully under the All Progressives Congress (APC).

== Early life and education ==
Herman Hembe was born on 22 June 1975 in Zaria, Kaduna State, Nigeria. He is from Mbakpor clan in Mbake Council Ward of Konshisha Local Government Area, Benue State. He attended Mount Saint Gabriel's Secondary School, Makurdi, where he obtained his Senior School Certificate in 1992. He later studied Law at Benue State University, Makurdi, graduating with a Bachelor of Laws (LL.B.) degree in 2001. He proceeded to the Nigerian Law School, Lagos Campus, and was called to the Nigerian Bar in 2003 after obtaining the Barrister at Law (B.L.) qualification.

== Legal career ==
Herman Hembe served with the Nigeria Immigration Service in Abeokuta, Ogun State. He later worked as a lawyer in private practice before entering politics.

== Political career ==
Herman Hembe became involved in politics while studying at Benue State University. During his time at the university, he served as Director of Socials of the Law Students Association and Director of Publicity of the Students' Union Government. He also served as Director of Sports of the National Association of Nigerian Students (NANS).

Herman Hembe was first elected to the House of Representatives in 2011 to represent the Vandeikya/Konshisha Federal Constituency of Benue State. During his time in the House of Representatives, he served as Chairman of the House Committee on the Federal Capital Territory (FCT) and later as Chairman of the House Committee on Public Procurement. In 2022, he became the Labour Party's candidate for the 2023 Benue State governorship election.
