= Audu Ogbeh =

Nigerian politician (1947–2025)

Audu Ogbeh OFR
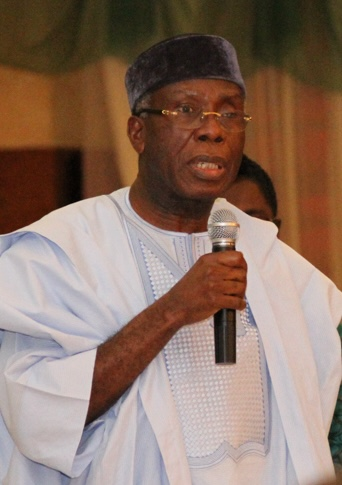
- Ogbeh in 2016

Minister of Agriculture and Rural Development
- In office 11 November 2015 – 28 May 2019
- President: Muhammadu Buhari
- Minister of State: Heineken Lokpobiri
- Preceded by: Akinwumi Adesina
- Succeeded by: Sabo Nanono

National Chairman of the Peoples Democratic Party
- In office 2001–2005
- Preceded by: Barnabas Gemade
- Succeeded by: Ahmadu Ali

Federal Minister of Communications
- In office 1982–1983
- President: Shehu Shagari
- Preceded by: Isaac Shaahu
- Succeeded by: Emmanuel Adiele

Personal details
- Born: Audu Innocent Ogbeh; 28 July 1947 Otukpo, Northern Region, Colony and Protectorate of Nigeria (now in Benue State, Nigeria)
- Died: 9 August 2025 (aged 78)
- Party: All Progressives Congress (2015–2025)
- Other political affiliations: National Party of Nigeria (1979–1983); Peoples Democratic Party (1998–2005)
- Spouse: married 1975
- Children: 5, including Ogwa Iweze
- Education: King's College, Lagos; Ahmadu Bello University; University of Toulouse
- Occupation: Politician; farmer; playwright

Audu Innocent Ogbeh OFR (28 July 1947 – 9 August 2025) was a Nigerian farmer, playwright and politician who served as the minister of agriculture and rural development from 2015 to 2019. He was chairman of the Peoples Democratic Party (PDP) from 2001 until January 2005. He served as the minister of communications in the Nigerian Second Republic from 1982 to 1983.

== Background ==
Ogbeh was born on 28 July 1947, in present-day Benue State. He was of Idoma background. He attended King's College, Lagos from 1967 to 1969, then studied at the Ahmadu Bello University, Zaria from 1969 to 1972 and the University of Toulouse, France from 1973 to 1974. He lectured at the Institute of Education, Ahmadu Bello University, Zaria from 1972 to 1976, and headed the department of humanities, Murtala College of Arts, Science and Technology from 1977 to 1979.

On 9 August 2025, Ogbeh's family announced to the Nigerian Television Authority that he had died earlier that day. He was 78.

== Political career ==
In 1979, he ran for office in the Benue State House of Assembly on the Platform of the National Party of Nigeria (NPN), becoming deputy speaker of the house. In 1982, he was appointed Federal Minister of Communications, and later became Minister of Steel Development. His term of office ended in December 1983, when a military coup brought Major-General Muhammadu Buhari to power.

On 11 November 2001, Ogbeh was appointed National Chairman of the People's Democratic Party (PDP), replacing Chief Barnabas Gemade. When asked how he would balance relations with President Olusegun Obasanjo and party executives, Ogbeh stated "I do have views of my own and most people who know me know that I have never been able to very cheaply compromise on those views. I do not intend to bully the President and the Vice President, but I intend to reason with them and I believe that between all of them, at one time or the other, they will bow to superior argument."

During his chairmanship, Ogbeh had a complex relationship with Obasanjo, supporting the president on some national issues while publicly criticising him on others. In December 2004, during a political crisis in Anambra following the first abduction of Governor Chris Ngige in July 2003, Ogbeh sent a letter to Obasanjo criticising his handling of the situation. The following month, his resignation was announced by the president's spokesperson Oluremi Oyo.

Ogbeh explained his resignation as an attempt to avoid conflict within the party, and due to a desire to return to farming. However, a widely held rumour claimed that Obasanjo was angered by Ogbeh's letter, with some reports alleging that the president visited Ogbeh at his family residence in early January 2005 and, after a meal of pounded yam, forced him to sign the resignation letter. Other accounts alleged that he was held at gunpoint during the visit. However, Ogbeh debunked these claims in 2018, calling them "totally false and a bunch of lies."

Following his resignation, President Obasanjo appointed Ogbeh as his Special Adviser on Agriculture.

== Later career ==
In December 2005, Ogbeh formally resigned from the PDP.

As of 2009, he was chairman and managing director, Efugo Farms, Makurdi, and a member of Eisenhower Exchange Fellowships Incorporated, based in Philadelphia, United States of America.

== Literary works ==
He wrote five plays, of which three were published in his lifetime. One of them, The Epitaph of Simon Kisulu, was staged at Muson Centre in 2002.
