= Terhemba Shija =

Nigerian academic and politician (born 1960)

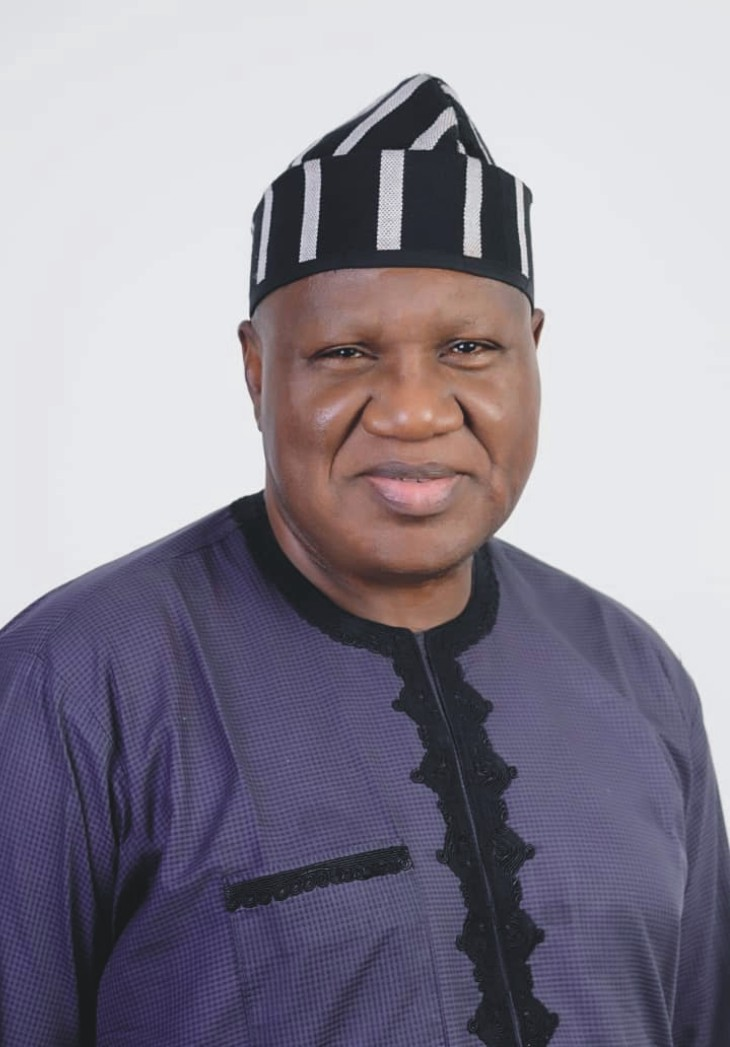
- Born: 23 November 1960 (age 65); Gboko, Benue State, Nigeria
- Occupations: Teacher, politician
- Spouse: Hon. Justice Theresa Mimi Shija
- Children: 2

Terhemba Shija is a Nigerian academic, poet, novelist, critic and politician who, as of 2014, lectures at the Nasarawa State University, Keffi.

== Early life ==
Terhemba Shija was born on 23 November, 1960 in Gboko, Nigeria to Shija Ihembe. He is from Nyumangbagh, Mbaduku, Vandeikya local government.

Shija served as a Member of the House of Representatives of Nigeria in 1992 Benue state.

He also served as Commissioner of Local Government and Chieftaincy Affairs Benue State, during the administration of Governor George Akume, resigning in December 2002; He is the author of several books of fiction, biography, literary criticism and poetry. His best known titles are "Whispers of Distant Drums" "The Siege, The Saga" and "Cantos for the Benue".
