= Roberts Orya =

Nigerian businessman

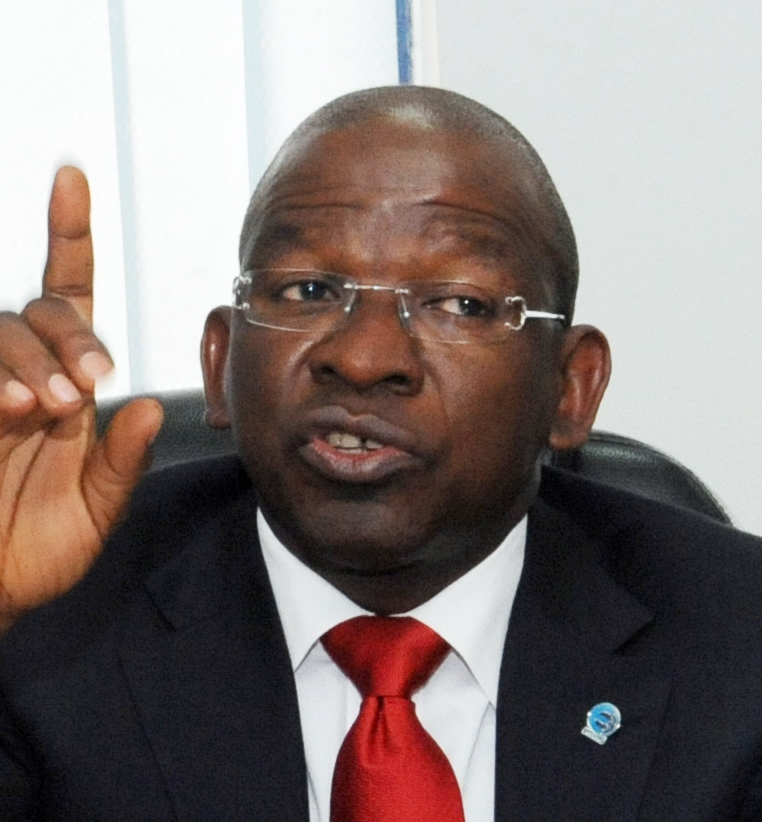

Former Managing Director/Chief Executive Officer Nigeria Export Import Bank (NEXIM)
- In office August 2009 – February 2016

Personal details
- Born: Ugwe, Benue State, Nigeria
- Education: University of Ibadan
- Occupation: Businessman, Banker, Management Consultant

Roberts U. Orya is a former managing director and CEO of the Nigerian Export-Import Bank (NEXIM) and honorary president of the Global Network of Export-Import Banks and Development Finance Institutions. He entered office in August 2009 to lead the bank's executive management team.

== Family background and early education ==
Orya was born in Ugwe, Benue State, Nigeria, from a poor background and a father who was physically challenged. He later attended Benue State Polytechnic from where he got an Ordinary National Diploma after completing his studies at the Teacher's College where he obtained a National Certificate of Education.

== NEXIM Bank ==
By December 2009, the new management of the bank inherited debts totaling about ₦14.6 billion, about 72 per cent of which was categorized as non-performing, while over ₦10.03 billion (69.05 per cent) was classified lost or irrecoverable in line with prudential guidelines.

== Achievements and initiatives At NEXIM Bank ==
Orya led the initiative of the Nigerian Export-Import Bank (NEXIM) in conjunction with the Federation of West African Chambers of Commerce and Industry.

To broaden the scope of the credit offering by the bank to guarantee credits for both export and import as well as credit insurance, he led the bank entered into agreements with some international credit institutions like the Islamic Development Bank. Through his leadership the bank also generated about 1.3 billion dollars (about ₦164 billion) foreign exchange earnings for the country during the period.

== Legal proceedings ==
In May 2021, the Benue State High Court ordered NEXIM to pay ₦500 million to Orya as damages for "unlawful arrest and detention".

== Policies and presentations ==
Orya's leadership in NEXIM initiated the Sealink project. He has contributed to national and international policies including:

- "Economic diversification, non-oil export growth back on front burner", by Roberts Orya
- A Practical Framework for Boosting Intra-Africa Trade, Financial Nigeria Magazine, August 2013
- Funding/investment Opportunities in the creative/entertainment industry
- Facilitating the non-oil sector in Nigeria
