= 2019 Benue State House of Assembly election =

Election in Nigeria

The 2019 Benue State House of Assembly election was held on 9 March 2019, to elect members of the Benue State House of Assembly in Nigeria. All the 30 seats were up for election in the Benue State House of Assembly.

Titus Uba from PDP representing Vandeikya-Kyan constituency was elected Speaker, while Christopher Adaji from PDP representing Ohimini constituency was elected Deputy Speaker.

== Results ==
The result of the election is listed below.

- Agnes Uloko from PDP won Ado constituency
- Edoh Godwin from PDP won Agatu constituency
- Abu James from PDP won Apa constituency
- Bunde Torkuma from PDP won Buruku constituency
- Agaibe N from PDP won Gboko East constituency
- Terna Achir from PDP won Gboko West constituency
- William Marange from PDP won Guma constituency
- Agbatse Geoffery from PDP won Gwer East constituency
- Chemetyo Damian from PDP won Gwer West constituency
- Agbidyeh Akute from APC won Katsina-Ala East constituency
- Orban Terungwa from APC won Katsina-Ala West constituency
- Dyako Tavershima from ADC won Konshisha constituency
- Tertsea Gbishe from PDP won Kwande East constituency
- Sugh Abanyi from PDP won Kwande West constituency
- Yagba Victor from PDP won Logo constituency
- Kwaghzer-Kudi Thomas from APC won Makurdi North constituency
- Terwase Aondoaka from PDP won Makurdi South constituency
- Onche Peter from PDP won Obi constituency
- Peter Enemari from PDP won Ogbadibo constituency
- Christopher Adaji from PDP won Ohimini constituency
- Ogbu Otumala from APC won Oju I constituency
- Okanga Okponya from PDP won Oju II constituency
- Anthony Agom from PDP won Okpokwu constituency
- Odeh Baba from APC won Otukpo/Akpa constituency
- Michael Audu from PDP won Adoka/Ugboju constituency
- Mngutyo Bem from APC won Tarka constituency
- Thomas Mlanga from PDP won Ukum constituency
- Abass Akoso from PDP won Ushongo constituency
- Ucha Dominic from PDP won Vandeikya-Tiev constituency
- Uba Titus from PDP won Vandeikya-Kyan constituency
