= Gbagbongom =

Settlement in Mbajor in Vandeikya

- Location of Gbagbongom
- Coordinates: 6°55′31.3″N 9°10′20.0″E

Gbagbongom is the biggest settlement in Mbajor in Vandeikya Local Government Area of Benue State, North-Central Nigeria. It is located between latitude 7°5' and 7°15' north of the Equator and Longitude 9° and 9°6' east of Greenwich. The population is around 5,000, mostly Tiv people who are predominantly farmers. Common agricultural produce from here include: ground-nuts, citrus, yam, cassava, sweet potatoes, maize, guinea corn, tomatoes and pepper. The post code is 982112.

The climate is tropical sub-humid with the mean annual rainfall of between 1,200 and 2,000 mm (47" and 79") averaging seven months in the year, while the mean annual temperature is 32.5 °C (90 °F). The wet season is from April to October or November while the dry season is November to March.
