= Steven Lawani =

Chief Steven Lawani (December 30, 1947) was the Deputy Governor of Benue State, Nigeria, he was the National Deputy Chairman of National Republican Convention (NRC), he was elected as a Senator under the United Nigeria Congress Party during the Sani Abacha transition program.

Lawani had his early education at St. Augustine Primary School Otukpo then Mount St. Michaels secondary school Aliade between 1962 and 1967 and later at the Government College, Kaduna from 1968 to 1969. He holds a B.Sc. (Hons) Economics degree from ABU Zaria and in 1975 he obtained an Advanced Diploma in Hotel Management, in Manchester Polytechnic in the UK, also in 1980 he obtained a Diploma in Management Development at Cambridge University also in the UK. He is a Fellow of the Nigeria Hotels and Catering Institute and Nigeria Institute of Economics.

He served in many capacities both in the private and public sectors; in 2004, he was conferred with the national honour of Officer of the Federal Republic (OFR) by the President, Chief Olusegun Obasanjo.
