= Daniel Saror =

Nigerian politician

Daniel Iyorkegh Saror

Senator of the Federal Republic of Nigeria from Benue North-East
- In office May 1999 – May 2007
- Succeeded by: Joseph Akaagerger

Personal details
- Born: Benue State, Nigeria
- Party: All Nigeria People's Party (ANPP)

Daniel Iyorkegh Saror was elected Senator for the Benue North East constituency of Benue State, Nigeria at the start of the Nigerian Fourth Republic, running on the People's Democratic Party (PDP) platform. He took office on 29 May 1999. He was reelected in April 2003 on the All Nigeria People's Party (ANPP) platform.

After taking his seat in the Senate in June 1999, Saror was appointed to committees on Solid Minerals, Science & Technology, Agriculture, Finance & Appropriation, Water Resources and Education (Vice Chairman). After reelection on the ANPP platform in 2003, Saror was appointed Deputy Minority leader. In the April 2007 elections, Saror ran unsuccessfully for Governor of Benue State on the ANPP ticket. He was defeated by Gabriel Suswam of the PDP who won 1,086,489 votes against Saror's 276,618.
