= Dickson Akoh =

Nigerian businessman

National Commandant of Peace Corps of Nigeria

Personal details
- Born: 10 July 1973 (age 53) Obalende, Lagos State Nigeria

Dickson Ameh Ojonye Akoh (born 1973) is the founder and National Commandant of Peace Corps of Nigeria.

== Early life ==
He earned a Bachelor of Science degree in sociology from the University of Abuja, and was conferred with a Doctor of Philosophy (Humanities), by the Commonwealth University, Belize.

The Board of Regent and Senate of Freedom University and Theology Seminary Pottstown, PA USA conferred on him the Award of Professorship in Social Works.

== Career ==
He is the chairman of Board of Trustees of the National Youth Council of Nigeria, which is the umbrella body of all voluntary youth organizations in Nigeria.

In 2017, during the opening of Peace Corps of Nigeria Headquarters in Abuja, he was arrested by members of State Security Service (Nigeria), Nigerian Police Force and the Nigerian Army. The arrest led to an assault on Peace Corps members. His arrest sparked a nationwide outcry.
