= Konshisha =

- LGA
- Interactive map of Konshisha
- Country: Nigeria
- State: Benue State
- Local Government Headquarters: Tse-Agberagba

Government
  - Local Government Chairman and the Head of the Local Government Council: Chikyaa Moses Terfa

Area
  - Land: 1,673 km^{2} (646 sq mi)

Population (2006)
  - Total: 225,672
  - Density: 134.9/km^{2} (349.4/sq mi)
- Time zone: UTC+1 (WAT)
- Postal code: 971

Konshisha is a local government area of Benue State, Nigeria. Its headquarters are in the town of Tse-Agberagba.

It has an area of 1,673 km^{2} and a population of 225,672 at the 2006 census. The area is majorly populated by members of the Tiv ethnic group. The Tiv language is widely spoken, while Christianity is the most commonly practiced religion in the area.

The postal code of the area is 971.

== History ==
Konshisha Local Government is named after the Konshisha River, which originates in Gboko Local Government. Its headquarters is named after the late Pa Agberagba Yonkyo, who founded a significant market in the area.

Konshisha Local Government was formed on February 28, 1983, out of former Vandeikya Local Government Area in Benue State.

However, the military government that took office at the moment in 1984 abolished the Local Government. On February 4, 1989, the General Ibrahim Bagandiga Administration decided to re-establish it.

== Notable people ==
- Barnabas Gemade
- Joseph Akaagerger

== Geography ==
Konshisha Local Government Area is located on a levelled land in the North East of Benue State lying between longitude 8o 400 East and Latitude 6o551 and 7o 231 North.

With a total area of 1,673 square kilometres or 646 square miles and an average temperature of 28 degrees Celsius or 82.4 degrees Fahrenheit, Konshisha LGA is quite large. Numerous bodies of water, like the Konshisha River and Beraba Lake, are found in the region. A number of mountains, including the Selagi and Agila mountains, are also found in the Konshisha LGA's landscape.

=== Climate ===
Warm weather, with temperatures ranging from 17 °C (63 °F) to 32 °C (90 °F), and sporadic extreme weather conditions, are the hallmarks of the season, which is distinguished by rainy and dry seasons.

Konshisha has a tropical savanna climate with a distinct wet season from April to October and a dry season from November to March. Annual rainfall typically falls between 1,300 mm (51 in) and 1,800 mm (71 in).

== Boundaries ==
Konshisha is bounded in the North by Gboko Local Government Area, Gwer Local Government Area in the west

Ushongo Local Government Area and Vandeikya Local Government Areas in the East, Oju Local Government in the South-West And, Cross River in the South.

== Economy of Konshisha ==
The majority of people in Konshisha LGA work in agriculture, and yam, cassava, rice, guinea corn, and soya beans are among the crops that are extensively farmed there. Trade is thriving in the region as well, and the LGA is home to a number of marketplaces where a diverse range of goods are bought and sold. The residents of Konshisha LGA also engage in quarrying, food processing, and hunting as significant economic activities.

In a similar vein, the populace does raise livestock. Goats, pigs, birds, Fulani cattle, and a variety of other domestic animals are some of the livestock raised in the area.

== Towns and villages in Konshisha ==
1. Tse-Agberagba
2. Gungul
3. Korinya
4. Ubwa
5. Tongo
6. Ikpeakor Mbayegh
7. Agera
8. Agera Mbashia
9. Mbavaa
10. Aba
11. Abagi
12. Aduu
13. Agen
14. Shikiri
15. Shom
16. Tor Mkar
17. Tsue
18. Yogbo
19. Yande
20. Ya-Akur
21. Tile
22. Talvough
23. Shan-Gevtie

Source -

== Council wards in Konshisha ==
Konshisha Local Government has eleven (11) Council Wards/Districts, which are:

1. Mbaiwarnyam Council Ward
2. Mbatsen Council Ward
3. Ikyurav/Mbatwer Council Ward
4. Mbayegh/Mbaikyer Council Ward
5. Tse-Agberagba Council Ward
6. Mbavaa Council Ward
7. Mbanor Council Ward
8. Mbatser/Mbagusa Council Ward
9. Mbake Council Ward
10. Mbawar Council Ward
11. Mbaikyase Council Ward

Konshisha local government has 212 polling units across the 11 districts of Gaav and Shangev-Tiev.

== Arts and culture ==
Music composers and singers:

1. Late Paul Deunav
2. Jasper
3. Vandelun Baja

Cultural dances:

1. Kyureke
2. Ingyinga
3. Ingyough
4. Takera
