= Tarka, Nigeria =

Tarka
- LGA
- Interactive map of Tarka
- Location within Nigeria
- Country: Nigeria
- State: Benue State
- Local Government Headquarters: Wannune

Government
  - Local Government Chairman and the Head of the Local Government Council: Anthony Sende

Area
  - Total: 371 km^{2} (143 sq mi)

Population (2006)
  - Total: 79,494
  - Density: 214/km^{2} (555/sq mi)
- Time zone: UTC+1 (WAT)
- Postal code: 981

Tarka is a Local Government Area of Benue State, Nigeria. Its headquarters is in the town of Wannune.

It has an area of 371 km^{2} and a population of 79,494 at the 2006 census.

The postal code of the area is 981.

== Climate ==
Tarka has a tropical wet and dry climate with a rainy season peaking between June and September and a dry season influenced by Harmattan winds from December to February. Temperatures range between 22 °C (72 °F) and 33 °C (91 °F), and rainfall totals around 1,200–1,600 millimetres (47–63 in) per year.
