= Kwande =

- LGA
- Interactive map of Kwande
- Country: Nigeria
- State: Benue State
- Local Government Headquarters: Adikpo

Government
  - Local Government Chairman and the Head of the Local Government Council: Hon. Neji Vitalis Terhile

Area
  - Total: 2,891 km^{2} (1,116 sq mi)

Population (2006)
  - Total: 248,697
  - Density: 86.02/km^{2} (222.8/sq mi)
- Time zone: UTC+1 (WAT)

Kwande is a Local Government Area of Benue State, Nigeria. Its headquarters are in the town of Adikpo.

Kwande has an area of 2,891 km^{2} and a population of 248,697 at the 2006 Census. It is bordered by several other LGAs. On the west, it is bordered by Vandeikya Local Government, Ushongo LGA on the north, and Katsina-Ala LGA on the northwest. On the south, it is bordered by Cross River State and in the southeast by the Republic of Cameroon. Kwande LGA also shares a common border with Takum LGA of Taraba State on the east. It has fifteen council wards but sixteen traditional districts.

As a result of its mountainous nature and proximity to the Cameroonian range of mountains, Kwande Local Government usually has cold weather which makes it very conducive to traders and investors. The local government also has very big rivers which usually take care of agricultural and industrial needs.

Kwande LGA was created out of the erstwhile Katsina-Ala Division on 3 February 1976 as a result of the nationwide Local Government Reforms of 1976 which was undertaken by the then military government of General Murtala Muhammed as part of its intention to return power to civilians, and a precursor to active comprehensive political action. The reform was also designed to spread government programmes to the grassroots and to institutionalize the local government system in Nigeria. The reform resulted in the creation of 301 local governments across the country of varying populations between 150,000- 800,000. Prior to the 1976 reform, the local government system in the country was less autonomous with the colonial era Native Authorities serving as an avenue of policy implementation directed from Lagos. Towards independence, a system of elected councils was created but after independence the power of the system was minimal.

== Climate ==
Kwande has a tropical climate with a long rainy season marked by high humidity and a dry season influenced by Harmattan winds. Annual rainfall ranges between 1,300 mm (51 in) and 1,900 mm (75 in), and temperatures typically vary from 21 °C (70 °F) to 32 °C (90 °F).

The postal code of the area is 982002.

== Clans found in Kwande Local Government Area include ==
- Nanev
- Shangev-ya
- Ikyurav-ya
- Turan

== Languages spoken ==
- English
- Tiv
