= Guma, Nigeria =

Guma, Nigeria gbajimba
- LGA
- Interactive map of Guma, Nigeria
- Country: Nigeria
- State: Benue State
- Local Government Headquarters: Gbajimba

Government
  - Local Government Chairman and the Head of the Local Government Council: Timothy Shawon (APC)

Area
  - Total: 2,882 km^{2} (1,113 sq mi)

Population (2006)
  - Total: 191,599
  - Density: 66.48/km^{2} (172.2/sq mi)
- Time zone: UTC+1 (WAT)
- Postal code: 970

Guma is a Local Government Area of Benue State, North Central Nigeria. Its headquarters are in the town of Gbajimba.

It has an area of 2,882 km^{2} and a population of 191,599 at the 2006 census.

The postal code of the area is 970.

== History ==
The Guma Local Government Area was established by the Makurdi Local Government in May 1989.

Former governor of Benue State elected in the April 11th, 2015 governorship election, Chief Dr. Samuel Ortom hails from Guma.

== Geography/Climate ==
Guma Local Governments Area has a total land area of 2,882 km^{2} (1,113 sq mi), and the Guma River runs through its borders. Guma LGA's average annual temperature is 29 degrees Celsius or 82 degrees Fahrenheit, and the region receives an average of 1,850 mm (73 in) of precipitation per year. Guma Local Government Area's humidity level is 61 percent on average.

With a landmass of 2,882 square kilometres (1,113 mi^{2}), Guma local government area is situated in the northern region of Benue State. It is situated at latitudes 06° 33' and 07° 03' North and longitudes 07°60' and 08° 12' East.

== Economy ==
The main source of income for the residents of Guma LGA is farming, and a wide variety of crops, including rice, yams, cassava, and maize, are produced there in sizable quantities. Salt, zinc, and byrite are only a few of the abundant mineral resources found in the LGA. Additionally, Guma LGA is home to a number of markets where a range of goods are bought and sold, including the Abinsi and Agasha markets. Blacksmithing and carpentry are two more significant economic pursuits of the people of Guma Local Government Area.

== Localities ==
Towns and Villages under Guma Local Government Areas:

- Abinsi
- Achuwa
- Agaku
- Agasha
- Agu
- Akahana
- Akumba
- Akure
- Akurungu
- Angula
- Anzum
- Aondo
- Badev
- Chiata
- Chivir
- Chongke
- Gaval
- Gbajimba
- Gogo
- Gyushage
- Ihalav
- Kaambe
- Kopii
- Major Musa
- Mbabai
- Mbawa
- Mbayer/Yandev
- Nyiev
- Nzorov
- Saghev
- Ukpiam
- Uvir
