= Titus Uba =

Speaker of Benue State House of Assembly

Speaker of the Benue State House of Assembly
- Preceded by: Terkimbi Ikyange
- Constituency: Kyan

Personal details
- Born: 25 September 1965 (age 60)
- Party: People's Democratic Party, PDP
- Other political affiliations: All Progressives Congress, APC (until 2018)

Titus Uba (born 25 September 1965) is a Nigerian politician who is currently serving as speaker of the Benue State House of Assembly since August 2018. Uba represents Kyan constituency in the state assembly. His emergence as the speaker of the house followed a vote of no confidence and the subsequent impeachment of the former speaker of the assembly, Terkimbi Ikyange. In 2019, Uba was re-elected speaker for the 9th Benue State House of Assembly.

== Education ==
Uba is a native of Akehe, Ute, in Vandeikya Local Government Area of Benue State. His early education started at LGEA Primary School in Akehe but later transferred to Demonstration Primary School, Makurdi where he finished with a First School Leaving Certificate in 1979. Uba studied at Saint Michael’s Secondary School, Aliade, finishing in 1984 with a General Certificate Examination (GCE). In 1987, Uba proceeded to Federal Polytechnic, Idah in Kogi State where he earned National Diploma in Mechanical Engineering in 1989. He obtained a Higher National Diploma (HND) in Mechanical Engineering from Federal Polytechnic, Bauchi in 2004.
