= Nigerian Export-Import Bank =

Nigerian export credit agency

Coordinates: 09°03′44″N 07°29′37″E

- Type: Export credit agency
- Founded: July 1, 1991; 35 years ago
- Headquarters: NEXIM House; 975 Cadastral Zone AO; Central Business District; Garki, Abuja, Nigeria
- Area served: Nigeria
- Key people: Abubakar A. Bello; Managing Director & Chief Executive Officer
- Owners: Federal Government of Nigeria & Central Bank of Nigeria
- Website: www.neximbank.com.ng

The Nigerian Export-Import Bank (NEXIM) is an export credit agency in Nigeria, established in 1991. In its function, NEXIM focuses on the development and expansion of the non-oil sectors of the Nigerian economy, with a view to reducing the country's over-reliance on oil exports.

== Mission ==
The NEXIM mission is to increase the rate of export of non-oil product for both small, medium, and large enterprises in all sectors of the economy by providing funds, risk-bearing programs, and advisory services in line with government trade policy.

== Location ==
The headquarters of Nexim are located at NEXIM House, Central Business District, Garki, Abuja, Nigeria. Nexim House is bordered by Kur Mohammed Avenue to the north, Ahmadu Bello Way to the east and Constitution Avenue to the south. Its geographical coordinates are: 09°03'44.0"N, 07°29'37.0"E (Latitude: 09.062222; Longitude:07.493611).

== Overview ==
NEXIM was established in 1991 as a joint venture between the Central Bank of Nigeria (CBN) and the Federal Ministry of Finance Incorporated (MOFI), with an initial capital of NGN: 50,000,000,000 (approx. US$132 million in 2021 money). *Note: US$1.00 = NGN379.52 on 27 February 2021.

According to the bank's website, some of its core functions include the following:

1. "Provision of export credit guarantee and export credit insurance to qualifying clients".

2. "Provision of credit in local currency to its clients in support of exports".

3. "Maintenance of a foreign exchange revolving fund for lending to exporters who need to import foreign inputs to facilitate export production".

4. "Maintenance of a trade information system in support of export business".

== Ownership ==
The financial institution is jointly owned by the CBN and MOFI, on a 50/50 basis.

== Financial position ==
As of 31 December 2015, the bank's total assets were valued at NGN:64,731,403,000 (approx. US$170,562,000 in 2021 money), with shareholders' capital of NGN:41,150,885,000 (US$108,429,000). *Note: US$1.00 = NGN379.52 on 27 February 2021.

== See also ==
- List of banks in Nigeria
- Economy of Nigeria
- ECOWAS
