= Benue State House of Assembly =

Legislative arm of the government of Benue State of Nigeria

The Benue State House of Assembly is the legislative arm of the government of Benue State of Nigeria. It is a unicameral legislature with 37 members elected from the 23 local government areas of the state. Bigger local government areas has two to three representatives at the state assembly. For example, the most populous local government areas like Gboko and Makurdi have three representatives each at the state assembly.

The 10th assembly of the Benue State House of Assembly is Chaired by Memberga Alfred Aondover as the speaker and it was inaugurated on the 5th of June 2023.

The fundamental functions of the Assembly are to enact new laws, amend or repeal existing laws and oversight of the executive. Members of the assembly are elected for a term of four years concurrent with federal legislators (Senate and House of Representatives) and the governor of the state. The state assembly convenes three times a week (Tuesdays, Wednesdays and Thursdays) for plenary in the assembly complex within the state capital, Makurdi. Outside this period, committee and other oversight activities are conducted

The leaders of the 9th Benue State House of Assembly were Titus Uba (speaker) and Christopher Adaji (deputy speaker). The Benue State House of Assembly consists of 37 constituencies drawn from the 23 Local government areas of the state. Some local government areas have more than one or even more than two constituencies. These state constituencies are Ado, Agatu, Apa, Obi, Oju 1, Oju 2, Oturkpo, Ankpa/Ugboju, Ogbadibo, Ado, Okpokwu, Makurdi North, Makurdi south, Makurdi East, Gwer west, Gwer East, Agasha, Guma, Gboko west, Gboko east, Gboko Central, Tarka, Buruku(Tombo), Nyamatsor, Konshisha 1( Gaav), Konshisha2( Ishangev Tiev), Kwande west, Kwande east, Mata, Mbagwa, Tiev, Kyan, Ukum 1, Ukum 2(Afia), Logo, Katsina ala west and Katsina ala East.
