= Samuel Ortom =

Nigerian politician

Samuel Ioraer Ortom

18th Governor of Benue State
- In office 29 May 2015 – 29 May 2023
- Preceded by: Gabriel Suswam
- Succeeded by: Rev. Fr. Hyacinth Alia

Federal Minister of Industry, Trade and Investment Nigeria
- In office 11 July 2011 – 25 October 2014

Supervising Minister, Nigerian Federal Ministry of Aviation Nigeria
- In office 14 February 2014 – 15 August 2014
- Preceded by: Princess Stella Oduah-Ogiemwonyi
- Succeeded by: Osita Chidoka

Personal details
- Born: 23 April 1961 (age 65) Guma LGA, Benue State, Nigeria
- Party: PDP

Samuel Ioraer Ortom (born 23 April 1961) is a Nigerian politician, businessman, administrator and philanthropist. He was a Minister of State Trade and Investments and the Supervising Minister for Aviation in Nigeria during the presidency of Goodluck Jonathan in 2011. Ortom was elected governor of Benue State as a member of the All Progressives Congress in 2015, though he later defected to the People's Democratic Party. He was re-elected as governor on 29 May 2019. Ortom's tenure ended on 29 May 2023, succeeded by a Catholic priest of the opposition party, Rev. Fr. Hyacinth Iormem Alia.

== Background and education ==
Ortom was born 23 April 1961 in Guma Local Government Area of Benue State, Nigeria. He attended St. John's Primary School, Gboko in 1970 but moved to St. Catherine's Primary School, Makurdi in 1974, completing his primary education in 1976. Chief Dr. Samuel Ioraer Ortom was admitted into Idah Secondary Commercial College, Idah in Kogi State in 1976. He did two years in the school before his father's retirement in 1979 ended his dream of completing formal secondary school education for financial reasons. He became a professional driver.

He later obtained the General Certificate of Education as well as the Diploma in Salesmanship. He enrolled at Ahmadu Bello University, Zaria and obtained both the Interim Joint Matriculation Board Certificate, in 1995 and the Diploma in Journalism in 1998. He later attended the Benue State University where he obtained an Advanced Diploma in Personnel Management in 2001 as well as a Master of Public Administration in 2004. Ortom earned a Ph.D., from the Commonwealth University, Belize, through distance learning.

== Political life ==
Ortom was a member of different political parties in Benue State including the National Centre Party of Nigeria as State Publicity Secretary; State Treasurer of the All People's Party (APP); and State Secretary as well as State Deputy Chairman of the People's Democratic Party (PDP). He was also Director of Operations of the PDP gubernatorial campaign in Benue State in 2007 and Director of Administration and Logistics of the Goodluck/Sambo Presidential Campaign Organization in 2011. He was the PDP National Auditor before his appointment as Minister of state, Federal Republic of Nigeria in July 2011.

In April 2015, he contested for Governor of Benue State and won, under the platform of the All Progressives Congress (APC).

In July 2018, Ortom announced his departure from All Progressives Congress as a result of an internal party crisis.

In the 9 March 2019 Benue gubernatorial election and 23 March 2019 Benue State supplementary governorship election, Ortom was reelected as Governor having polled 434,473 votes while the runner up Emmanuel Jime of the All Progressive Congress polled 345,155 votes. Following the election, Jime challenged Ortom's victory and filed a petition on the grounds of substantial noncompliance with the provisions of the Electoral Act, 2010 as amended. On 21 January 2020 the Supreme Court affirmed the election of Samuel Ortom as the duly-elected governor of Benue State.

== Philanthropy ==
Through the establishment of Oracle Business Limited Foundation, Ortom has set aside funds in St. Theresa's Hospital, Makurdi and Rahama Hospital, Gboko Road, Makurdi, for treatment of hernia and snakebites free of charge to the patients. The foundation also works to alleviate hardship for prison inmates, while also offering various forms of skills acquisition for better reintegration into the society. The Oracle Driving School is another outreach, which trains qualified drivers on a regular basis.

== Awards ==
Year	Category	Institution or publication	Result	Notes	Ref.
2014	Selfless Service Award	National Union of TarabaState Students (UniCal Chapter)	Won	Notes	Citation

== See also ==
- List of governors of Benue State
