= Gwer East =

- LGA
- Interactive map of Gwer East
- Country: Nigeria
- State: Benue State
- Local Government Headquarters: Aliade

Government
  - Local Government Chairman and the Head of the Local Government Council: Hon. Timothy Nyiakura Adi

Area
  - Total: 2,294 km^{2} (886 sq mi)

Population (2006)
  - Total: 163,647
  - Density: 71.34/km^{2} (184.8/sq mi)
- Time zone: UTC+1 (WAT)
- Postal code: 971

Gwer East is a Local Government Area of Benue State, Nigeria. Its headquarters is in the town of Aliade.

It has an area of 2,294 km^{2} and a population of 163,647 at the 2006 census.

The postal code of the area is 971.

The Local Government has three districts: Yonov, Njiriv, and Ngyohov. It has 17 council wards and shares a boundary with seven other local government areas.
