= Barnabas Andyar Gemade =

Nigerian politician (born 1948)

Barnabas Andyar Iyorhyer Gemade
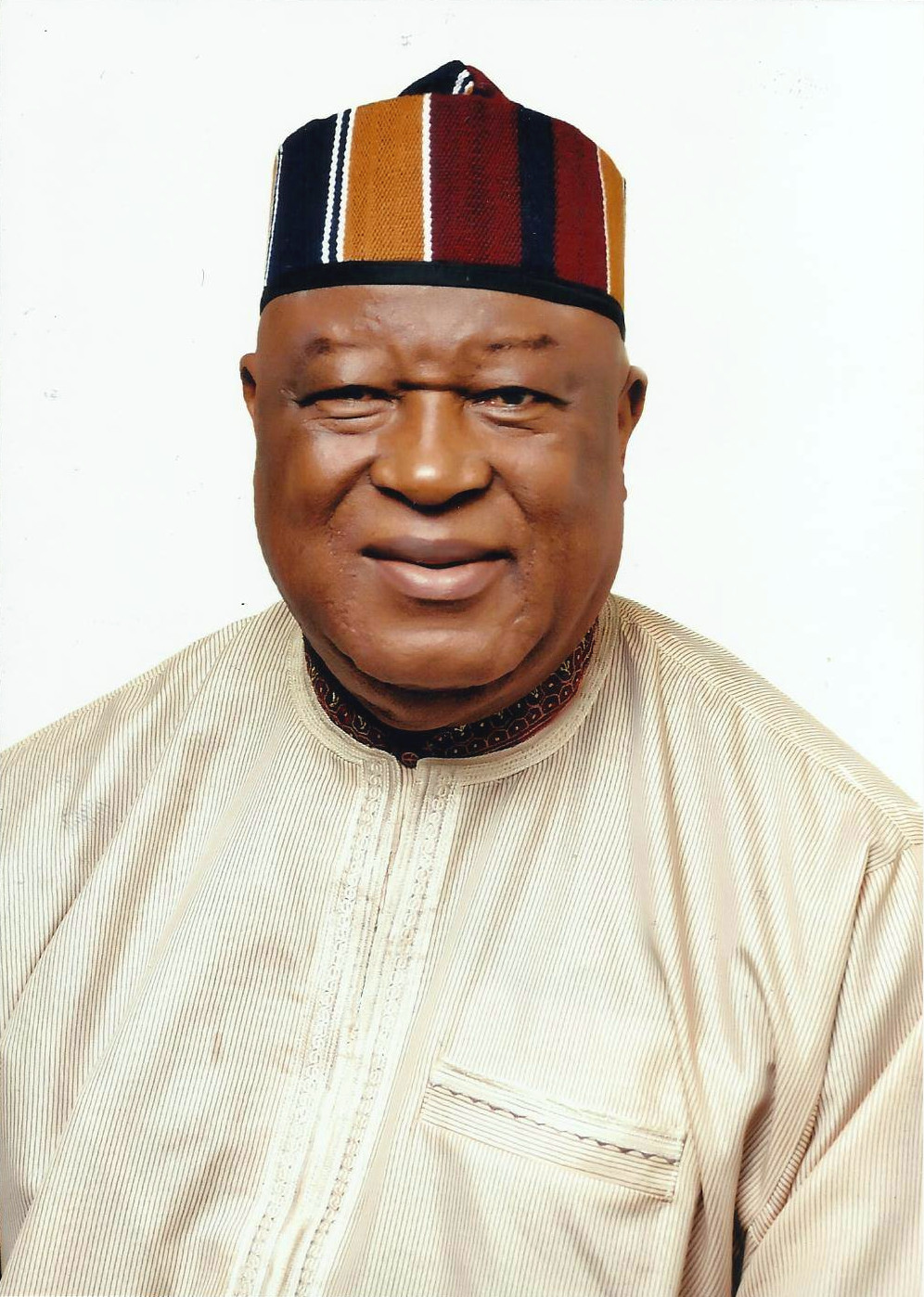

Senator for Benue North East
- Incumbent
- Assumed office May 2011
- Preceded by: Joseph Akaagerger

National Chairman of People's Democratic Party
- In office 1999–2001
- Preceded by: Solomon Lar
- Succeeded by: Audu Ogbeh

Personal details
- Born: 4 September 1948 (age 77) Benue State, Nigeria
- Party: People's Democratic Party (1998-2014, 2018); All Progressives Congress (2014-2018, 2018-present)

Barnabas Andyar Iyorhyer Gemade (born 4 September 1948) is a Nigerian politician who was former national chairman of the People's Democratic Party (PDP) and former senator.

== Early career ==
Born on 4 September 1948 in Benue State, Gemade is a chief from the Tiv ethnic group.

He holds a Tiv traditional title of Nom-I-Yange-I-Tiv.

Gemade was the chief executive officer of the Benue Cement Company (BCC) from 1985 to 1992.

He was a member of the 1994/1995 Constitutional Conference during the military regime of General Sani Abacha.

He has held the positions of Secretary (Minister) of Works and National Chairman of the Congress of National Consensus party, which was one of the parties sponsored by then-military dictator, General Sani Abacha.

== PDP chief ==
In the first national convention of the PDP after the April 1999 general elections, Gemade was elected National chairman after a tough competition with one of the party founders, Chief Sunday Awoniyi.

He succeeded Solomon Lar, the first chairman of the party, and was elected in part due to zoning rules which favoured allotment of the post to a northerner.

Gemade initially had the backing of President Olusegun Obasanjo.

However, before the 2001 National Convention held on 9 and 10 November, he was facing strong opposition from powerful interests in the party.

When he contested for a second term with Dr. Okwesilieze Nwodo as secretary, the two lost out to chief Audu Ogbeh who became chairman and Vincent Ogbulafor who became secretary.

In the 2003 PDP presidential primaries, Gemade lost to former president Olusegun Obasanjo, who went on to be re-elected. In April 2003, he was expelled from the PDP on account of alleged anti-party activities.

However, it was generally suspected that the main reason was that he had supported the candidate of the United Nigeria Peoples Party (UNPP) rather than the PDP candidate, Chief George Akume.

Later he was readmitted to the party and became a member of its board of trustees. In a January 2011 interview, he described the turbulence in the leadership of the PDP in the early years as healthy, showing competition between individuals rather than a power-sharing arrangement between the different groups.

In a November 2010 interview, Gemade supported the decision to allow incumbent President Goodluck Jonathan to run for election, despite the fact that some felt zoning rules meant the candidature should go to a northerner. He disputed that Jonathan's candidature could lead to the breakup of the country, and noted as a member of a minority ethnic group in the north that the minority groups had always been strong supporters of national unity.

== Senator ==
Gemade was a strong supporter of Joseph Akaagerger when he was elected Senator for Benue North East in 2007. In the April 2011 elections, he decided to challenge Akaagerger for the Senate seat.

Several incidents occurred in Benue in run-up to the election, culminating in the shooting of General Lawrence Onoja. Gemade was among leaders questioned about the violence by the State Security Services in March 2011. Others questioned included George Akume, Iyorchia Ayu and Daniel Saror.

In the 9 April 2011 elections for Senator of Benue North East, Gemade ran on the PDP platform and won against his primary opponent, Akaagerger, who had moved to the Action Congress of Nigeria.
