= Gabriel Suswam =

Nigerian politician

Former Governor of Benue State
- In office 29 May 2007 – 29 May 2015
- Preceded by: George Akume
- Succeeded by: Samuel Ortom

Personal details
- Born: 15 November 1964 (age 61) Anyiin, Logo LGA of Benue State
- Education: University of Lagos

Gabriel Torwua Suswam (born 15 November 1964) is a Nigerian politician and former Governor of Benue State. He represented Benue North-East Senatorial district in the 9th National Assembly of the Federal Republic of Nigeria.

== Early life and education ==
Gabriel Suswam was born on 15 November 1964 in Anyiin, Logo Local Government Area of Benue State. In 1986, he was admitted into the Law Faculty of the University of Lagos. He obtained an LL.B degree in 1989, and the BL Certificate from the Nigerian Law School, Lagos in 1990. He was called to the Bar that year. He worked for other law firms from 1990 to 1994, while continuing his studies. In 1994 he launched his own law firm.

== Political career ==
In the 1999 election, he ran for office in the House of Representatives for the Katsina-Ala/Ukum/Logo Federal Constituency, and was elected on the People's Democratic Party (PDP) platform. He was appointed chairman of the House Services Committee, and later chairman, House Committee on FCT. He ran again, and was reelected in 2003. On 3 July 2003, he was appointed chairman, House Committee on Appropriation, then in August 2005 he was appointed chairman, House Committee on Power.

In April 2007 he was elected Governor of Benue State.

In November 2009, he spoke in favor of automatic re-election of all political office holders who exemplified themselves in the discharge of their responsibilities. In a separate interview, he said politicking was the major factor militating against the development of the state since its creation.

Suswam ran for a second tenure in the 26 April 2011 gubernatorial elections on the PDP platform. He scored 590,776 votes, beating runner-up Professor Torkuma Ugba of the Action Congress of Nigeria (ACN), who got 499,319 votes.

On the 28 March 2015 general elections, Gabriel Torwua Suswam lost the senatorial seat election to Chief Barnabas Gemade of All Progressives Congress (APC).

In March 2024, Suswam declared intention to contest for the position of the chairmanship of the PDP.

== Controversy ==
In 2024 Abubakar Umar, has narrated before the Federal High Court, Maitama, Abuja, he converted the sum of ₦3.1 billion and delivered its equivalent of $15.8 Million in Cash to Suswan at his residence in Maitama. On 8 August ₦413 Million was sent to Abubakar Umar Suswan telling him to change it into dollars and take the money to his house near Juma'at Mosque.

== See also ==
- List of governors of Benue State
