= Vandeikya =

- Town and LGA
- Interactive map of Vandeikya
- Location in Nigeria
- Coordinates: 6°48′N 9°06′E
- Country: Nigeria
- State: Benue State

Area
  - Total: 687 km^{2} (265 sq mi)

Population (2022)
  - Total: 338,700
  - Density: 493/km^{2} (1,280/sq mi)
- Time zone: UTC+1 (WAT)

Vandeikya is a town and local government area in Benue State, Nigeria.

Vandeikya LGA was carved out of Gboko Local Government Council in 1976. The indigenous community is the Kunav people who speak Tiv language. The Vandeikya people are a hospitable group and are predominantly Christians with a few traditionalists.

The LGA is endowed with mineral deposits such as barites, kaoline, and iron ores.

Being principally farmers, the major commercial engagements of the people in the area revolve around agricultural products. Presently, there are no major industries in the area; however, there are many small-scale cottage industries like rice milling, block making, furniture works, and others. The settlement pattern is dispersed with thatched round houses.

== Geography ==
Vandeikya Local Government Council is located between latitude 7°5' and 7°15' north of the Equator and Longitude 9° and 9°6' east of Greenwich.

Vandeikya is in the South Eastern part of Benue State and shares boundaries with Obudu and Bekwara in Cross River State to the East, Ushongo to the North and Konshisha Local Government Area to the West.

Vandeikya Local Government area is dominated by undulating terrain with much of the area being below 183 m (600 ft) above the sea level. Surface drainage is generally good with almost all the rivers being seasonal, notably river Aya and river Be.

=== Climate ===
The climate is tropical sub-humid with the mean annual rainfall of between 1,200 and 2,000 mm (47 in and 79 in). The Vandeikya climate is one of the friendliest in the state. It gets colder around Mbaduku district and Mbayongo district because of their proximity to Obudu mountains.

The hot seasons at Vandeikya lasts for approximately 2.2 months, which are from January 30 to April 6, with an average daily high temperature above 31.7 °C.

The hottest month of the year is March, with an average high of 31.7 °C and low of 22.8 °C.

The cool season lasts for 3.9 months, from June 21 to October 18, with an average daily high temperature below 28.3 °C.

The coldest month of the year is December, with an average low of 18.9 °C and high of 29.4 °C.

Climate data for Vandeikya (1980–2024)
Month	Jan	Feb	Mar	Apr	May	Jun	Jul	Aug	Sep	Oct	Nov	Dec	Year
Mean daily maximum °C (°F)	30.0 (86.0)	31.7 (89.1)	31.7 (89.1)	30.6 (87.1)	29.4 (84.9)	28.3 (82.9)	27.8 (82.0)	27.2 (81.0)	27.8 (82.0)	28.3 (82.9)	29.4 (84.9)	29.4 (84.9)	31.7 (89.1)
Daily mean °C (°F)	23.9 (75.0)	25.6 (78.1)	26.7 (80.1)	26.7 (80.1)	26.1 (79.0)	25.0 (77.0)	24.4 (75.9)	24.4 (75.9)	24.4 (75.9)	25.0 (77.0)	25.0 (77.0)	23.9 (75.0)	25.1 (77.2)
Mean daily minimum °C (°F)	18.9 (66.0)	20.6 (69.1)	22.8 (73.0)	23.3 (73.9)	23.3 (73.9)	22.8 (73.0)	22.2 (72.0)	21.7 (71.1)	22.2 (72.0)	22.2 (72.0)	21.1 (70.0)	18.9 (66.0)	21.7 (71.1)
Average precipitation mm (inches)	2.54 (0.10)	12.70 (0.50)	55.88 (2.20)	119.38 (4.70)	175.26 (6.90)	208.28 (8.20)	215.90 (8.50)	228.60 (9.00)	254.00 (10.00)	210.82 (8.30)	48.26 (1.90)	2.54 (0.10)	1,534.16 (60.40)
Average precipitation days (≥ 1.0 mm)	0.6	2.5	10.9	18.2	22.7	22.9	23.0	24.2	25.4	23.2	7.0	0.6	181.0
Average relative humidity (%) (at 15:00 LST)	36.3	55.8	85.0	96.3	99.5	99.6	99.9	99.3	99.6	99.3	69.1	36.9	81.4
Mean monthly sunshine hours	365.8	368.9	343.6	369.0	384.4	375.0	387.5	381.3	366.0	372.0	354.0	362.7	4,430.2
Mean daily sunshine hours	11.8	11.9	12.1	12.3	12.4	12.5	12.5	12.3	12.1	12.0	11.8	11.7	12.1
Source: Weather spark

=== Clouds ===
In Vandeikya, the cloudiest month of the year is May. On average, the sky is overcast or mostly cloudy 86% of the time. The cloudier part of the year begins around February 26 and lasts for 8.6 months, and ends around November 15. The clearer part of the year starts from November 15 and lasts for 3.4 months, and ends around February 26. December is the clearest month of the year. The sky is on the average 46% most of the time clear.

=== Precipitation and rainfall ===
The wetter season starts from March 25 to November 4 and lasts for 7.3 months. The month with the most wet days is September, with an average of 25.4 days of precipitation.

The drier season lasts 4.7 months, from November 4 to March 25. The month with the fewest wet days is January, with an average of 0.6 days of precipitation

The most common form of precipitation throughout the year is rain alone, with a peak probability of 86% on September 30.

The rainy season of the year can last for 9.4 months, from February 16 to November 29.

=== Sunlight ===
The longest day of the year is June 20, with 12 hours, 31 minutes of daylight.

The earliest sunrise is at 6:06 AM around May 24, and the latest sunrise is 36 minutes later at 6:42 AM from February 1. The earliest sunset is at 6:02 PM from November 12, and the latest sunset is 41 minutes later at 6:44 PM from July 15.

Daylight saving time (DST) is not observed.

== Council wards ==
Vandeikya is divided into Tyev and Kyan state constituencies with a total of 12 council wards which are;

- Vandeikya township council ward
- Mbagbam council ward
- Mbadede council ward
- Mbagbera council ward
- Mbajor council ward
- Mbayongo council ward
- Mbakaange council ward
- Nyimangbah council ward
- Ningev council ward
- Mbatyough council ward
- Tsambe council ward
- Mbakyaha council ward

=== Districts ===
Vandeikya is divided majorly into 8 Districts/Areas as follows;

- Mbaduku district
- Mbagbera district
- Mbakaange district
- Mbara district
- Mbayongo district
- Ningev district
- Tsambe district
- Ute district

=== Towns and villages ===
Mbakaange district
Vandeikya town, Ankar, Tse - sho, Uganden, Aginde

Ningev district
Agirgba, Bako, Korinya, Nor-Gemaityo

Mbagbera district
Achwa, Adobi, Ahile Jime, Branch Atser, Gorkem, Gube, Jape, Mfor, Naa, Tse-Isua

Mbaduku district
Tsar, Abwa, Agbile, Betse, Chenge, Dagba, Gbe, Gbegba, Hembe, Ikpoikpo, Shan, Tile.

Mbayongo
Adamgbe, Agera, Agidi- Mbakena, Guda, Mbayongo, Shangbum, Tse-Atuul, Tse-Wande, Tyemimongo

Ute District
Agu, Ako Abwa, Akofate, Anza Tokuyo, Bako, Koti-Yough, Kpamor, Kyoosu Ugo, Mbaakon, Pev, Sambe, Sati, Taatihi, Timbir, Tse-Dabo, Tse Kase Nor, Tse Kpum, Tse Mker.

Tsambe District
Adeiyongo, Ager, Atayo, Dav, Ifan, Kaamem, Lijam Mue, Nyaro, Tsambe, Tse-Anshungu, Tse-Nduul, Yaaya

Mbara district
Abaki, Alagh-Ngulum, Alakali, Anonog, Bako, Gbagbongom, Igbee, Ihugh, Iyenge, Kiishi, Labe, Mandun, Mbaakon, Mede, Moji, Ndete, Tor-tiv , Tse-Amough, Tse-Gedege, Tse-Ji, Uka.

== Education ==
Vandeikya Local Government Area has continuous growth in education development, especially in tertiary education. The most significant developments in the area are the establishment of the Benue State University of Agriculture, Science and Technology (BUSAST), in Ihugh.

The National Universities Commission (NUC) approved BUAST’s establishment on 14^{th} of May 2025, following the presentation of the institution's academic ephemeral, physical master plan and enabling university law by the Benue State Government. The university was established with a specialised focus on agriculture, science and technology, with the objective of contributing to agricultural development, scientific research and higher education in the State.

The Catholic Diocese of Gboko's 2025 directory also listed Bishop Usuh University in Vandeikya township among its Catholic tertiary institutions which commences in 2026.

== Economy ==
=== Agriculture ===
Agriculture is the mainstay of the people; with arable land for sheep, goats and cattle rearing. Over 80% of the population are directly engaged in the peasant farming of virtually all major food crops.

Vandeikya and Ihugh markets are the national hubs for Rice, sweet potatoes, sorghum, citrus, cassava, bananas, spices, tomatoes, palm oil and palm products, pears, ive, kola nuts, akpu, garri, palm wine etc

Ningev sheep and goat grazing farms owned by the Federal government of Nigeria.

=== Markets ===
Ihugh and Agbo markets are the major markets in Vandeikya.

Other markets are Tsar, Koti-Yough, Gbem, Dagba, Betse, Agidi Mbakena, Anhyula tswar, Agu, Sambo, Pev, Taatihi, Adeiyongo, Tor Tiv, Mede, Anongo and Ugba.

Upcoming market
Our Lady of Perpetual Help Ultra-Modern Market in Vandeikya

=== Investment potentials ===
There is great potential for starch, palm wine bottling, glucose, vegetable oil production, fruit juice production, mining and processing, education real estate.

=== Road network ===
Trunk ‘A’ federal highway. This is the major road that connects the major parts of the North East with the South South. The road links Cross River State through Ogoja with other Northern states like Taraba State, Adamawa State, Yobe State and Borno State

There is also a federal highway that connects other towns and markets within like Obudu, Tsar-Mbaduku, Vandeikya town, Ihugh, Lessel, Tse - Agberagba, Gboko, Katsina-Ala, Zaki biam etc.

=== Health care ===
General hospital owned by the Benue State government
missionary hospital
little private clinics.

== Notable people ==
=== Politicians and government ===
- Hyacinth Alia, executive governor of Benue State
- Anna Darius Ishaku, First lady of taraba state
- Ambrose Feese, Former minister of works and housing
- Hon. Dorothy Mato --- former house of reps member

=== Military and law enforcement ===
- John Mark Inienger
- Joseph Akaahan Agbo
- Lawrence Igyuse Doki

=== Entertainment and sports ===
- Apollo Crews, professional wrestler
- Kiddwaya, tv personality.

=== Cultural icons ===
- Makir Zakpe, First Tor Tiv

=== Education ===
- Terhemba Shija
- Professor Damian Tersoo Anyam
