= Logo, Nigeria =

- LGA
- Interactive map of Logo, Nigeria
- Country: Nigeria
- State: Benue State
- Local Government Headquarters: Ugba

Government
  - Local Government Chairman and the Head of the Local Government Council: Hon. Terseer Agber

Area
  - Land: 1,408 km^{2} (544 sq mi)

Population (2006)
  - Total: 169,063
  - Density: 120.1/km^{2} (311.0/sq mi)
- Time zone: UTC+1 (WAT)
- Postal code: 980

Logo is a Local Government Area of Benue State, Nigeria. Its headquarters are in the town of Ugba. Logo Local Government Area was established in December 1996 following its separation from Katsina-Ala Local Government Area. The name "Logo" originates from the Logo stream, which flows across the area from East to West.

It has an area of 1,408 km^{2} and a population of 169,063 at the 2006 census.

The postal code of the area is 980.

== Climate ==
Logo experiences a tropical savanna climate, with a rainy season extending from April to October and a dry season from November to March. The area receives approximately 1,200–1,600 millimetres or 47–63 inches of rainfall annually, and temperatures range between 23 °C or 73 °F and 34 °C or 93 °F.
