= Ushongo =

Ushongo Kwande Bar-Azóv
- Town and LGA
- Motto: Land of fertility
- Interactive map of Ushongo
- Country: Nigeria
- State: Benue State
- Local Government Headquarters: Lessel

Government
  - Local Government Chairman and the Head of the Local Government Council: Hon. Mvendaga Atetan

Area
  - Total: 1,228 km^{2} (474 sq mi)

Population (2006)
  - Total: 188,341
  - Density: 153.4/km^{2} (397.2/sq mi)
- Time zone: UTC+1 (WAT)
- Postal code: 982

Ushongo is a town and Local Government Area in Benue State, Nigeria, with its headquarters in Lessel town.

It covers an area of 1,228 km² (474 sq mi) and has a population of 188,341 according to the 2006 census.

The postal code for Ushongo Local Government is 982.

== Climate ==
Ushongo experiences a tropical savanna climate with a rainy season lasting from April to October and a dry season from November to March. Rainfall ranges from 1,300 millimetres (51 in) to 1,800 millimetres (71 in) annually, while temperatures typically remain between 21 °C (70 °F) and 32 °C (90 °F).
