= George Akume =

Nigerian politician (born 1953)

Secretary to the Government of the Federation
- Incumbent
- Assumed office 7 June 2023
- President: Bola Tinubu
- Preceded by: Boss Mustapha

Minister of Special Duties and Inter-Governmental Affairs
- In office 21 August 2019 – 29 May 2023
- President: Muhammadu Buhari
- Succeeded by: Zephaniah Jisalo

Senator for Benue North-West
- In office 5 June 2007 – 9 June 2019
- Preceded by: Fred Orti
- Succeeded by: Emmanuel Yisa Orker-Jev

Senate Minority Leader
- In office 6 June 2011 – 6 June 2015
- Succeeded by: Godswill Akpabio

Governor of Benue State
- In office 29 May 1999 – 29 May 2007
- Deputy: Ogiri Ajene
- Preceded by: Dominic Oneya
- Succeeded by: Gabriel Suswam

Personal details
- Born: 27 December 1953 (age 72)
- Party: All Progressives Congress (2013–present)
- Other political affiliations: Peoples Democratic Party (1998–2010); Action Congress of Nigeria (2010–2013)
- Spouse: Regina Akume
- Education: University of Ibadan
- Occupation: Politician
- Website: www.georgeakume.com

George Akume CON (born 27 December 1953) is a Nigerian politician who is the 21st and current Secretary to the Government of the Federation. He served as Minister of Special Duties and Inter-Governmental Affairs from 2019 to 2023, during the administration of President Muhammadu Buhari. He was the Senator representing Benue North-West Senatorial District between 2007 and 2019. He was also the Minority Leader of the Senate from June 2011 to June 2015. He served as the Governor of Benue State from May 1999 to May 2007.

Akume was re-elected Senator for Benue North-West in the April 2011 elections, running on the platform of the Action Congress of Nigeria. He won another term in 2015 but lost to Senator Emmanuel Yisa Orker-Jev of the PDP in 2019. On 23 July 2019, President Buhari nominated Akume to serve as the Minister of Special Duties and Intergovernmental Affairs.

== Early life and education ==
Akume obtained a bachelor's degree in sociology and a master's degree in Labour Relations from the University of Ibadan.

== Political career ==
=== Career in state government ===
In 1999, Akume became governor of Benue State and served two terms of four years. In 2007, he won election to represent the people of Benue as a senator for Benue North-West in Nigeria's senate.

Akume was re-elected Senator for Benue North-West in the April 2011 elections, running on the Action Congress of Nigeria (ACN) platform. He polled 261,726 votes, defeating Terngu Tsegba of the PDP who won 143,354 votes. He was again re-elected to the senate under the platform of the All Progressives Congress (APC) in 2015. He was chairman senate committee on army and a ranking member of senate.

=== Career in national government ===
Akume was nominated and confirmed a minister of the Federal Democratic Republic of Nigeria by Muhammadu Buhari in August 2019. On 2 June 2023, President Bola Ahmed Tinubu appointed him Secretary to the Government of the Federation (SGF).

In July 2025, Akume was tasked with leading a committee which made it so Buhari's burial would be a "statewide burial."

== National honours ==
In May 2023, Akume was conferred Nigerian national honour of Commander of the Order of the Niger (CON) by President Muhammadu Buhari.

== Personal life ==
George Akume is married to Regina Akume, a member of the House of Representative.

== Projects ==
- Water Project

== See also ==
- List of governors of Benue State
