= Wilfred Chikpa Anagbe =

Nigerian Catholic prelate (born 1965)

His Excellency, Monsignor Wilfred Chikpa Anagbe C.M.F
- Bishop of Makurdi
- Church: Catholic
- Diocese: Makurdi
- Installed: 28 March 2015
- Predecessor: Athanasius Atule Usuh
- Previous posts: Coadjutor Bishop of Makurdi (2014‍–‍2015); Military Chaplain (2009‍–‍2015); Member of the Economic Council of the Claretian Generalate in Rome (2008‍–‍2013); Provincial Bursar of the Claretians in Nigeria (2005‍–‍2015)

Personal details
- Born: 2 April 1965 (age 61) Aondona, Raav-Udem District, Gwer West, Benue State, Nigeria
- Education: St. James' Minor Seminary in Makurdi (1980‍–‍1985); Claretian Institute of Philosophy, Owerri (1987‍–‍1990); Spiritan International School of Theology, Enugu State (1990‍–‍1994) (Master's in theology); University of Salamanca (2004‍–‍2005) (interrupted)
- Motto: To serve Jesus and the Brethren

Ordination history
History
Episcopal consecration
- Principal consecrator: Augustine Kasujja
- Co-consecrators: William Avenya, Michael Ekwoyi Apochi

Wilfred Chikpa Anagbe C.M.F (born 1965) is a Nigerian prelate of the Catholic Church, serving as bishop of the Diocese of Makurdi. He was appointed coadjutor bishop of Makurdi in 2014, and succeeded to the office of bishop in 2015.

Anagbe has performed the following duties in his priestly career:

- 1994–1998: Director of Vocations of the Claretian PP. in Nigeria
- 1996–1998: School manager, Claretian School Board
- 1998–2000: Parish priest of St. Peter's Parish, Gariki, Diocese of Enugu
- 2000–2004: Farm Manager, Claretian Farm Project, Utonkon
- 2003–2004: Parish Priest of St. Fidelis Parish, Allan, and Dean of Utonkon of the Diocese of Otukpo
- 2004–2005: Theology course at the University of Salamanca (interrupted when he was elected Provincial Bursar)
- 2005–2015: Provincial Bursar of the Claretians in Nigeria
- 2008–2013: Member of the Economic Council of the Claretian Generalate in Rome
- 2009–2012: Military Chaplain of the 34th Artillery Brigade, Obinze
- 2013–2015: Military Chaplain 3rd Battalion Effurun Barracks, Warri.

== Persecution of Christians ==
In July 2022 Anagbe told Aid to the Church in Need that over 60 Christians had been killed in Benue State in the previous two months.

In a speech in the European Parliament in October 2022, Anagbe compared the situation of Christians in his country to "nothing short of a Jihad clothed in many names: terrorism, kidnappings, killer herdsmen, banditry, other militia groups" and called on the international community to abandon what he termed a "conspiracy of silence" on the subject.
