= János Scitovszky =

Hungarian prelate

His Eminence János Scitovszky
- Cardinal, Archbishop of Esztergom; Primate of Hungary
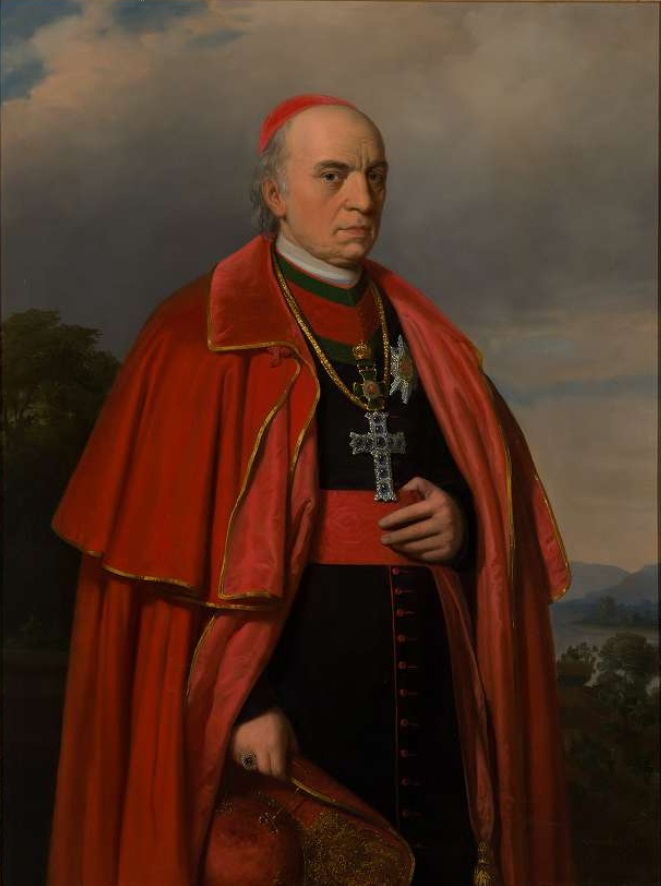
- See: Archdiocese of Esztergom
- Installed: 21 July 1849 – 19 October 1866
- Predecessor: János Hám (elected)
- Successor: János Simor
- Other posts: Bishop of Rozsnyó; Bishop of Pécs

Personal details
- Born: 1 November 1785 Béla, Kingdom of Hungary, Austrian Empire, (today Košická Belá, Slovakia)
- Died: 19 October 1866 (aged 80) Esztergom, Hungary
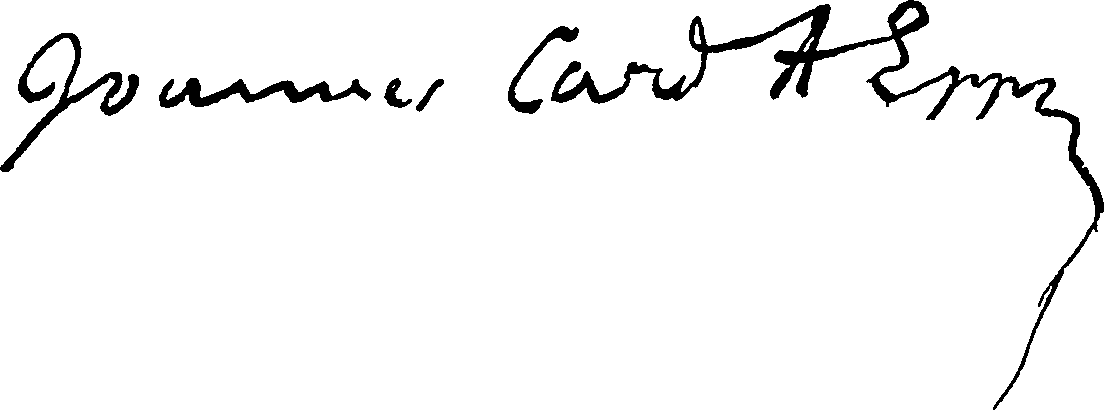
- Signature

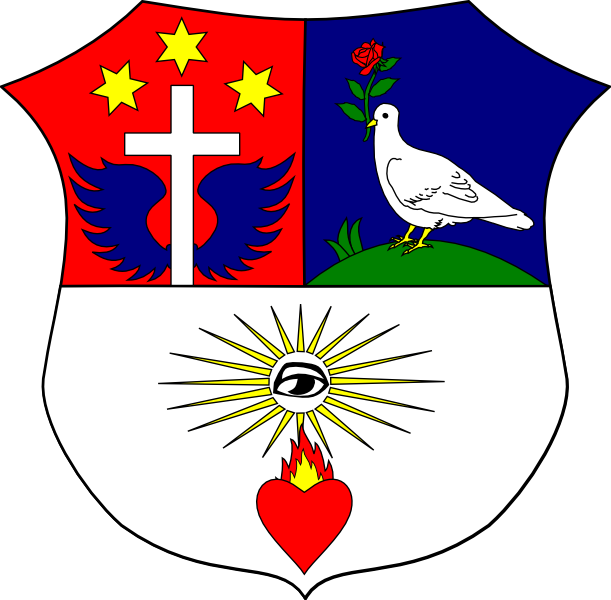
- Coat of arms

János Keresztély Scitovszky de Nagykér (Hungarian: nagykéri Scitovszky János Keresztély; Slovak: Ján Krstiteľ Scitovský; 1 November 1785 – 19 October 1866) was a Hungarian prelate, Cardinal of the Roman Catholic Church and Archbishop of Esztergom and Primate of Hungary.

== Biography ==
Scitovszky was born into a family of Polish noble origin (originally called Szczytowski). One of its members, Antal (János' grandfather), settled to Szepesváralja, Kingdom of Hungary (present-day Spišské Podhradie, Slovakia) in 1730.

He was the son of Márton and Borbála Karácsonyi Scitovszky. His father was a rural school teacher. He studied in Jelšava and then at the gymnasium of Rozsnyó before entering the seminary at Trnava.

Ordained in November 1809, he became rector of the diocesan minor seminary, where he taught philosophy and theology for ten years. In 1824, he became a canon of the cathedral Cathedral of the Assumption of the Blessed Virgin Mary, Rožňava.

He was chosen bishop of Rozsnyó in 1828. While bishop, he founded a boarding school in Rozsnyó and a high school in Rimaszombat. In 1839, he was transferred to Diocese of Pécs where he created the People's Teachers' Pension Fund for old teachers. He became archbishop of the Metropolitan See of Esztergom in September 1849. His attempts to save The 13 Martyrs of Arad proved unsuccessful.

After the collapse of the Hungarian Revolution of 1848, the Holy Crown of Hungary was hidden in a forest in Transylvania. When it was discovered in 1853, the Emperor wished to confirm its authenticity; the Primate himself transported the Holy Crown to Vienna by train, and from the window of the train car, showed it to the people who gathered at every station. After a Te Deum in the court chapel, the crown was returned to the royal castle in Buda.

During his tenure, the upper church of the Primatial Basilica of the Assumption of the Blessed Virgin Mary and St Adalbert was completed and dedicated on August 31, 1856, in the presence of Emperor Franz Joseph along with the Viennese Court. The ceremonies featured the premiere of the Missa solennis zur Einweihung der Basilika in Gran (Gran Mass), composed and conducted by Franz Liszt, and featured the organist Alexander Winterberger. The piece had been commissioned by the Archbishop.

About a week later, Liszt himself played at a Mass when Archbishop Scitovszky consecrated the new Hermina Chapel in Budapest, dedicated to the memory of Archduchess Hermine of Austria. A plaque near the entrance commemorates the occasion.

Scitovszky was created cardinal priest of Santa Croce in Gerusalemme November 16, 1854. He led a pilgrimage to Mariazell in 1858. He was awarded the Grand Cross of the Order of Sankt Stefan.

Cardinal Scitovszky died on 19 October 1866 in Budapest, and was buried in the metropolitan cathedral of Esztergom.

== Cathedral library ==
In 1853, Scitovszky undertook construction of the Cathedral Library, which was built according to plans by József Hild One of the richest religious libraries of Hungary, it houses approximately 250,000 books, among which are several codices and incunabula, such as the Latin explanation of the ‘Song of Songs’ from the 12th century, the ‘Lövöföldi Corvina’ originating from donations of King Matthias, or the Jordánszky Codex, which includes the Hungarian translation of the Bible from 1516 to 1519.

Catholic Church titles
Preceded by Ferenc Lajcsák	Bishop of Rozsnyó; 1828–1839	Succeeded by Domonkos Zichy
Preceded by Ignác Szepesy	Bishop of Pécs; 1838–1849	Succeeded by György Girk
Preceded by János Hám elected	Archbishop of Esztergom; 1849–1866	Succeeded by János Simor
