= Thucca in Mauretania =

Thucca was a town in the Roman province of Mauretania Sitifensis.

Pliny the Elder describes Thucca as "impositum mari et flumini Ampsagae" (overlooking the sea and the River Ampsaga), and thus on the border with Numidia. The town was a Christian bishoprics and are included in the Catholic Church's list of titular sees.

Although the precise location of the town is unclear, historians consider it likely that its site is now occupied by the ruins of Merdja, near in present-day Algeria. The town is referred to as Thucca in Mauretania to distinguish it from Thucca in Numidia, which is today Henchir-El-Abiodh, further east inland in Algeria.

== Bishops ==
The names of two of the bishops of Thucca in Mauretania are known:

- Honoratus, who spoke in support of the position held by Saint Cyprian on the validity of baptism administered by heretics at the Council of Carthage (255);
- Uzulus, one of the Catholic bishops summoned by king Huneric to the Council of Carthage (484) and then exiled for refusing to convert to Arianism.

=== Titular bishops ===
- Ignacio de Alba y Hernández † (25 July 1967 - 18 January 1976, resigned)
- William Dermott Molloy McDermott † (19 May 1976 – 14 January 1982, appointed Bishop of Huancavelica)
- Osmond Peter Martin † (8 June 1982 – 11 November 1983, appointed Bishop of Belize)
- Vladimír Filo † (17 March 1990 – 23 November 2002, appointed Coadjutor Bishop of Rožňava)
- François-Xavier Maroy Rusengo (22 November 2004 - 26 April 2006 appointed Archbishop of Bukavu)
- William Amove Avenya (28 November 2008 – 29 December 2012 appointed Bishop of Gboko)
- Han Lim Moon (February 6, 2014 – December 5, 2020 appointed Coadjutor Bishop of Venado Tuerto)
- Wallace Ng'ang'a Gachihi (13 February 2024 – 15 August 2024 appointed Military Ordinary in Kenya)
