= Mount Saint Gabriel's Secondary School =

Coordinates: 7.7318°N 8.5173°E

- Makurdi, Benue State; Nigeria

Information
- Type: Catholic secondary school
- Motto: In God Our Strength
- Established: 14 January 1964; 62 years ago
- Founder: Bishop James Hagan
- Principal: Rev. Fr. James Orshoja Utav
- Grades: JSS 1 – SSS 3
- Gender: Boys
- Enrollment: ~1,080
- Campus: Urban
- Accreditation: WAEC, NECO, NERDC
- Alumni: MSGOBA
- Website: msgmkd.com

Mount Saint Gabriel's Secondary School (MSG) is a Catholic all-boys boarding school in Makurdi, Benue State, Nigeria. Founded on 14 January 1964 by Bishop James Hagan of the Catholic Diocese of Makurdi, it was the first secondary school in Makurdi. MSG follows the WAEC, NECO and NERDC curricula and is recognized for academic excellence in Benue State.

== History ==
MSG opened in 1964 as a Day Secondary School for boys with 63 students from diverse ethnic groups, including Tiv, Idoma, Igbo, and Hausa. Classes were initially held in temporary structures at Holy Ghost Parish (later Spiritian Press), it was the first secondary school in Makurdi.

The school moved to its permanent site near Government Craft School (now Government College) in 1966. Development stalled during the Nigerian Civil War (1967–1971), when Igbo and European staff departed, leading to single-class enrolment (1967–1970) and initial poor academic results (e.g., 29% pass rate in 1962). Post-war recovery saw growth: a third stream was added in 1974, expanding to six streams by 1976.

== Academics ==
The school operates under Nigeria's 6-3-3-4 education system. Both the Junior Secondary School (JSS) and the Senior Secondary School (SSS) span three years each, with JSS 1–3 and SSS 1–3.

Each year group is divided into six classes (A–F) but due to the low popularity in 2024 the classes now reduced to (A-D), with a maximum of 30 students per class.

Academic performance improved dramatically from the mid-1970s. By 2003, 89% of 178 students scored ≥5 credits in WASSCE, while 100% achieved this in NECO. The school has ranked among Nigeria’s top five secondary schools for over three decades. MSG is ranked first in Benue State for WAEC performance, according to the state’s Ministry of Education.

== Campus and student life ==
Mount Saint Gabriel's Secondary School features six dormitories, each of which also serves as one of the six houses. These houses are named after African saints (Uganda Martyrs) : St. Tuzinde, St. Muggaga, St. Kizito, St. Lwanga, St. Mukasa, and St. Kalemba.

The campus includes science laboratories, a library, ICT centers, boarding houses, and sports facilities. The school chapel serves as a central gathering space for religious activities.

MSG hosts annual inter-house competitions in athletics and academics. Student-led clubs include debate, journalism, and STEM activities.

== Principals ==
Principals of MSGS
| Name | Tenure | Notes |
|---|---|---|
| Rev. Fr. Stanislaus Roman, C.S.Sp. | 1964–1968 | Founding principal |
| Eugene O'Connor | 1968–1971 | |
| Very Rev. Fr. Angus Fraser, MFR, C.S.Sp. | 1971–2014 | Longest-serving principal; oversaw infrastructure expansion. |
| Rev. Fr. John Asen | 2014–2021 | Removed after allegations of student mistreatment. |
| Philip Ahembe | 2021 (acting) | |
| Very Rev. Fr. Pax Finbarr Jey-Sharwan, VC | 2021–2022 | Appointed by the Catholic Diocese. |
| Rev. Fr. James Orshoja Utav | 2022–present | Current principal. |

== Notable alumni ==
MSGOBA, the alumni association, unites graduates globally to support the school. Collaborating with the PTA and government, it has helped sustain the institution’s reputation for producing leaders across fields worldwide.

Alumni of MSG, known as the MSGOBA, include:

- Innocent "2Baba" Idibia – Grammy-nominated musician.
- Michael Aondoakaa – Former Attorney General of Nigeria.
- Iyorchia Ayu – Former President of the Nigerian Senate.
- Gbenro Ajibade – Actor and model.

== Controversies ==
In March 2021, principal Rev. Fr. John Asen was suspended after a video showing him physically disciplining a student went viral. The incident sparked debates on corporal punishment in Nigerian schools.
