= Antal Andrássy =

Hungarian Jesuit and bishop

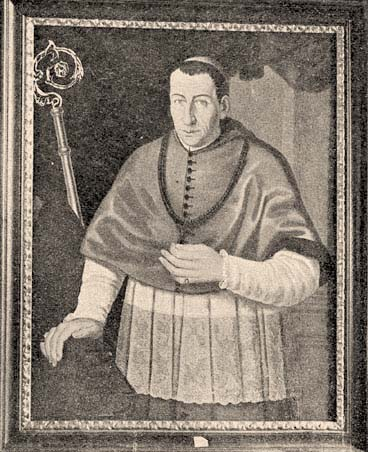
- Born: October 28, 1742; Románfalva, Kingdom of Hungary (today: Rumanová, Slovakia)
- Died: November 2, 1799 (aged 57)

Baron Antal Andrássy de Csíkszentkirály et Krasznahorka (October 28, 1742 – November 2, 1799) was a Hungarian Jesuit who served as second Bishop of the Roman Catholic Diocese of Rozsnyó (today: Rožňava) from December 17, 1780, until his death.

== Works ==
- Appendix subnexa censurae testamentis demonstrationis trium propositionum de poenali transitu ex religione romano-catholica ad evangelicam. Budae, 1790.
- Epistola pastoralis ad clerum suum de necessitate unius salvificae catholicae fidei.
