= Diocese of Gboko =

Roman Catholic diocese in Nigeria

Diocese of Gboko Dioecesis Gbokensis

Location
- Country: Nigeria
- Territory: a portion of Benue State
- Ecclesiastical province: Abuja
- Metropolitan: Abuja
- Coordinates: 7°19′30″N 9°0′18″E

Statistics
- Area: 10,692 km^{2} (4,128 sq mi)
- Population: Total; Catholics: 2,267,015; 1,567,224 (69.1%)
- Parishes: 89
- Schools: 23

Information
- Denomination: Roman Catholic
- Rite: Latin Rite
- Established: 29 December 2012
- Cathedral: Cathedral of Saint John the Baptist in Gboko
- Secular priests: 180

Current leadership
- Pope: Leo XIV
- Bishop: William Avenya

Map
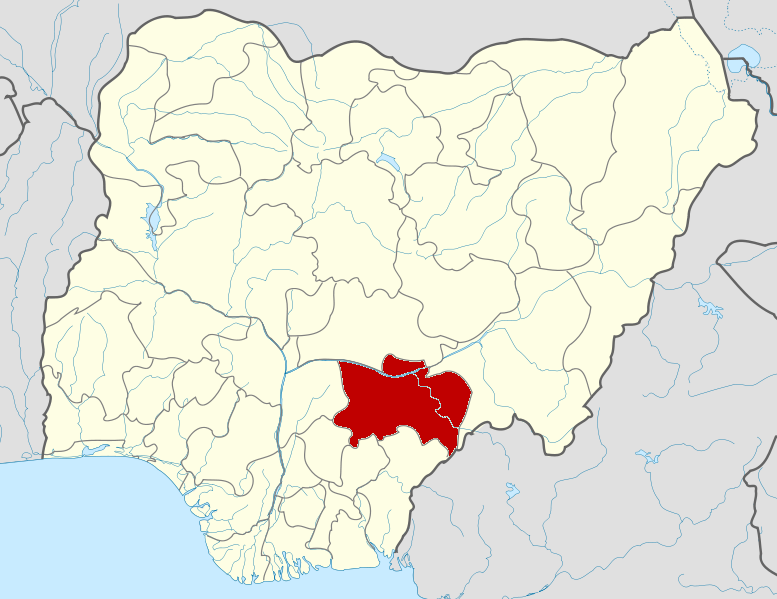
- Gboko is located in Benue State which is shown in red.

The Roman Catholic Diocese of Gboko (Latin: Gbokensis(us)) is a diocese located in the city of Gboko, Benue State in the ecclesiastical province of Abuja in Nigeria.

== Territory ==
The Diocese of Gboko is located in a portion of Benue State.

== Chronology of Bishops ==
- Bishop William Amove Avenya (29 December 2012 – present)

== History ==
The diocese was established 29 December 2012 from the Roman Catholic Diocese of Makurdi.

== See also ==
- Catholic Church in Nigeria

== Sources ==
Official Announcement of establishment of new diocese by Vatican News
