= Vladimír Filo =

Slovak Roman Catholic bishop (1940–2015)

His Excellency Vladimír Filo
- Bishop of Rožňava
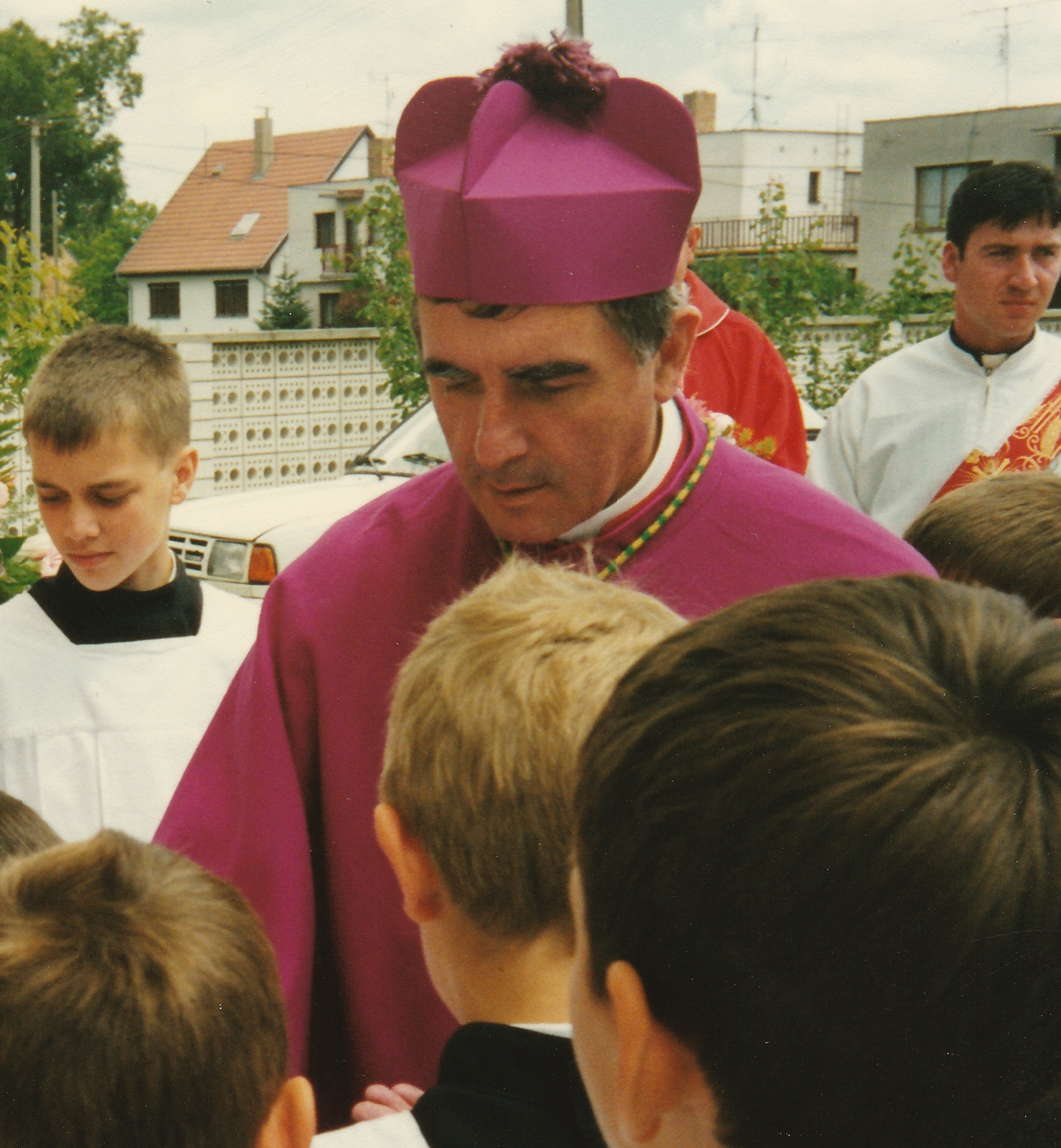
- Filo in 1997
- Church: Roman Catholic
- Installed: 28 January 2009
- Term ended: 21 March 2015
- Predecessor: Eduard Kojnok
- Successor: Stanislav Stolárik
- Previous post: Auxiliary bishop of Trnava (1990–2002)

Orders
- Ordination: 25 July 1962
- Consecration: 16 April 1990 by Ján Sokol

Personal details
- Born: 15 January 1940 Gáň, First Slovak Republic
- Died: 18 August 2015 (aged 75) Nitra, Slovakia
- Education: Comenius University
- Motto: Mihi Vivere Christus est (Latin for 'To me, to live is Christ')
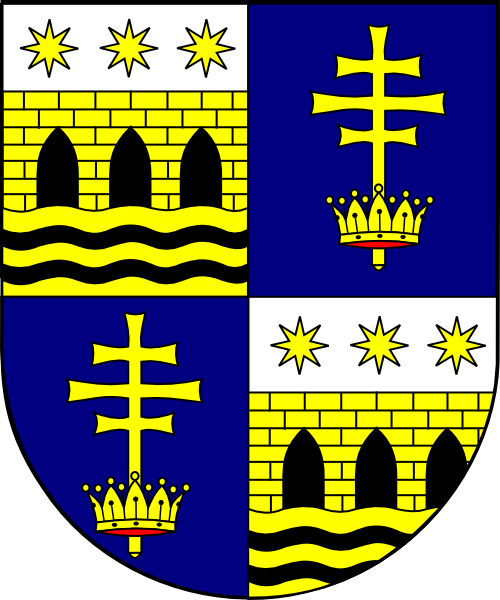
- Coat of arms

Styles of Vladimír Filo
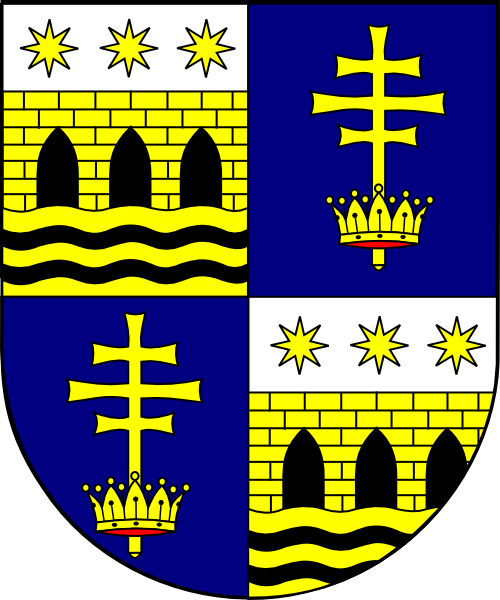
- Reference style: His Excellency; The Most Reverend
- Spoken style: Your Excellency
- Religious style: Bishop

Vladimír Filo (15 January 1940 – 18 August 2015) was a Slovak Roman Catholic bishop.

== Biography ==
Vladimír Filo was born on 15 January 1940 in the village of Gáň in Galanta District. He studied theology at the Comenius University and was ordained a priest on 25 July 1962. Afterwards, he served as a chaplain in several parishes, including Senec, Trnava, Kolárovo, and Nové Zámky. In 1966, he was appointed ceremoniary at the diocesan office in Trnava. Two years later, in 1968, he was sent to Rome for further studies. From 1976, he served as parish priest in Veľký Cetín. On 17 March 1990, Pope John Paul II appointed him auxiliary bishop of the Archdiocese of Trnava and assigned him the titular see of Thucca in Mauretania. He was consecrated as a bishop on 16 April 1990 in Trnava.

Between 1990 and 1991, he served as rector of the Seminary of Saints Cyril and Methodius in Bratislava. From 1990 to 1998, he was also a professor of canon law at the Comenius University. Beginning in 1992, he held the position of judicial vicar at the ecclesiastical court. He was also the chairman of the Slovak Liturgical Commission.

=== Bishop of Rožňava ===
After becoming the bishop of Rožňava, Filo promised to finish restoration of Church property, that had been nationalized during Communist rule of Czechoslovakia. He cancelled business agreements with the oligarch Jozef Majský, negotiated during the tenure of his predecessor Eduard Kojnok.

In 2013, Filo ordered the Salesians of Don Bosco to leave the diocese, without providing any reason, despite having previously praised the Salesians as an inspiration behind his decision to become a priest. After Filo retired in 2015, his successor Stanislav Stolárik invited the Salesians to return to the diocese.

== Death ==
Vladimír Filo died briefly after retirement on 18 August 2015, at the age of 75 in Nitra. He was buried in his home village of Gáň.
