= Angus Fraser (disambiguation) =

Angus Fraser (born 1965) is an English cricketer.

Angus Fraser may also refer to:

- Angus Fraser (civil servant) (1928–2001), British civil servant
- Angus Fraser (television producer), Canadian film and television writer
- Angus Fraser (rugby union) (born 1999), Scottish rugby union player
- Angus Fraser (priest)
