= Angus Fraser (priest) =

Vincentian Catholic priest (1931–2018)

- Title: Reverend Father

Personal life
- Born: Angus Fraser; April 8, 1931 Cane Cove Grove House, Saint Vincent and the Grenadines
- Died: October 7, 2018 (aged 87) Princess Royal University Hospital, Farnborough, United Kingdom

Religious life
- Religion: Catholic
- Institute: Congregation of the Holy Spirit

Angus Fraser MFR, CSSp (April 8, 1931 – October 7, 2018) was a Vincentian Catholic priest, educator, and founder of the Via Christi Society who was known for his lifelong commitment to education and mentoring in Nigeria. At the time of his death, he was Nigeria's longest-serving teacher.

== Early life and education ==
Fraser was born in Cane Cove Grove House, St. Vincent Island, Caribbean. Raised in an Anglican family, his encounter with Catholicism during his schooling at St. Vincent Grammar School led to his conversion. Despite familial resistance, Fraser pursued his education at Mt. St. Benedict’s secondary school, Tunapuna, a school run by Monks from the College of the Benedictine. and St Mary’s College, Port of Spain, Trinidad, eventually embracing priesthood with the Holy Ghost Fathers after studies in Philosophy and Theology and ordination by John Charles McQuaid of Dublin, Ireland in 1959.

== Career ==
His journey as a missionary commenced with his arrival in the Diocese of Owerri, Nigeria, in 1961. His early days involved service at Our Lady of Fatima church in Kano and subsequent assignments under notable figures like Bishop Godfrey Okoye and Bishop Francis Cardinal Arinze. During his tenure in Port Harcourt, he served as a secretary, teacher, and diocesan liturgist.

Fraser assumed the position of principal at Mt. St. Gabriel’s Secondary School in Makurdi in 1971. He served for 43 years before retiring. His mentees included former Nigerian senate president and cabinet minister, Iyorchia Ayu, ex Attorney General of the Federation, Michael Aondoakaa, afrobeats singer, Tuface Idibia and clergyman William Avenya.

== Contested burial location ==
Fraser is said to have expressed his desire to be buried in Garkwaa, Plateau State, where he moved to after leaving leadership roles at Via Christ Society and Mount Saint Gabriel's in 2014. His family had wished for him to be buried in St. Vincent & the Grenadines. The Provincial Leadership Team proposed he should be in London or Aliade, where the Holy Ghost Fathers have a Congregation. However, Rome permitted his burial at Mount Saint Gabriel’s Compound in Makurdi.

== Honours ==
In 2003, Fraser received the Member of the Federal Republic (MFR) National Award from President Olusegun Obasanjo. He was also recognized as the "Best Teacher in Nigeria" and honored with a "Lifetime Achievement Award" by former US President Bill Clinton.
