= Fidelis oga Orgah =

- Bishop of Otukpo
- Church: Catholic Church
- Diocese: Diocese of Otukpo
- In office: 10 July 1995 – 7 December 2000
- Predecessor: Diocese erected
- Successor: Michael Ekwoyi Apochi

Orders
- Ordination: 16 March 1979
- Consecration: 28 October 1995 by Donal Joseph Murray

Personal details
- Born: 29 March 1953
- Died: 7 December 2000 (aged 47)

Fidelis oga Orgah (born 29 March 1953 in Adim Akpa – died 7 December 2000) was a Nigerian prelate of the Catholic Church who served as bishop of the Roman Catholic Diocese of Otukpo. He was appointed bishop in 1995. He died in 2000.
