= Thucca in Numidia =

Thucca in Numidia was an Ancient Roman era town and the seat of an ancient Bishopric during the Roman Empire, which remains only as a Latin Catholic titular see.

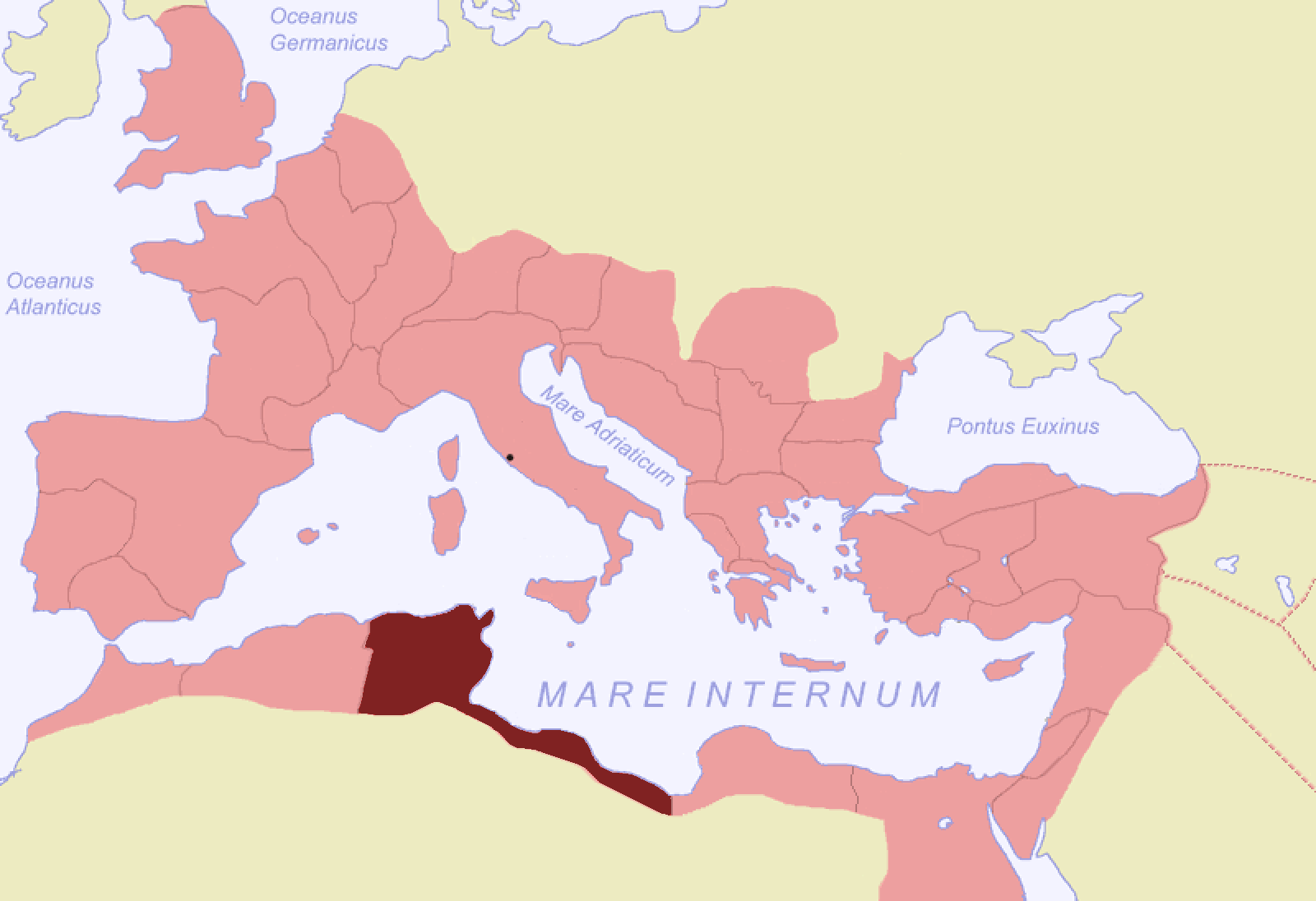
Roman province Africa proconsularis.

== History ==
The city in the Roman province of Numidia, and has been tentatively identified with ruins at modern Henchir-El-Abiodh, present Algeria, was important to become one of its many suffragan dioceses, in the papal sway, yet was destined to fade.

Two of its residential Bishops are historically documented :

- Saturninus, recorded in 255
- Sabinus, in 411

The city and bishopric lasted till the 7th century Muslim conquest of the Maghreb, today it is incorporated into northern Algeria.

== Titular see ==
The diocese was nominally restored in 1933 as Latin titular bishopric Thucca in Numidia (Latin) / Tucca di Numidia (Curiate Italian) / Thuccen(sis) in Numidia (Latin adjective).

It has had the following incumbents, of the fitting Episcopal (lowest) rank with an Eastern Catholic and an (other) archiepiscopal exception:

- Juan Vicente Solís Fernández (1967.03.30 – death 1973.01.16) as emeritate, formerly Bishop of Alajuela (Costa Rica) (1940.07.03 – retired 1967.03.30)
- Federico Richter Fernandez-Prada, Friars Minor (O.F.M.) (1973.04.12 – 1975.09.20 see below) as Auxiliary Bishop of Archdiocese of Piura (Peru) (1973.04.12 – 1975.09.20)
- Titular Archbishop: Federico Richter Fernandez-Prada, O.F.M. (see above 1975.09.20 – 1979.11.20) as Coadjutor Archbishop of Ayacucho (Peru) (1975.09.20 – 1979.11.20), later succeeding as Metropolitan Archbishop of Ayacucho (1979.11.20 – retired 1991.05.23), died 2011
- Jean-Baptiste Tiendrebeogo (1981.11.05 – 1996.03.30) as Auxiliary Bishop of Archdiocese of Ouagadougou (Burkina Faso) (1981.11.05 – 1996.03.30), later Bishop of Kaya (Burkina Faso) (1996.03.30 – death 1998.05.14)
- Joseph Perumthotttam (2002.04.24 – 2007.01.22) as Auxiliary Bishop of Changanacherry of the Syro-Malabars (India) (2002.04.24 – 2007.01.22), later succeeding as Metropolitan Archeparch (Archbishop) of Changanacherry of the Syro-Malabars (India) (2007.01.22 – ...)
- Liro Vendelino Meurer (2009.01.14 – 2013.04.24) as Auxiliary Bishop of Archdiocese of Passo Fundo (Brazil) (2009.01.14 – 2013.04.24); later Bishop of Santo Ângelo (Brazil) (2013.04.24 – ...)
- Bishop-elect Martin David (2017.04.07 – ...), Auxiliary Bishop of Diocese of Ostrava–Opava (Czech Republic) (2017.04.07 – ...), no previous prelature.

== See also ==
- List of Catholic dioceses in Algeria
- Thucca in Mauretania, nearby episcopal see (now titular)

== Sources and external links ==
- GCatholic - data for the titular see
- Catholic-hierarchy

Bibliography

- Pius Bonifacius Gams, Series episcoporum Ecclesiae Catholicae, Leipzig 1931, p. 469
- Stefano Antonio Morcelli, Africa christiana, Volume I, Brescia 1816, p. 334
