= Eduard Kojnok =

Slovak Roman Catholic bishop

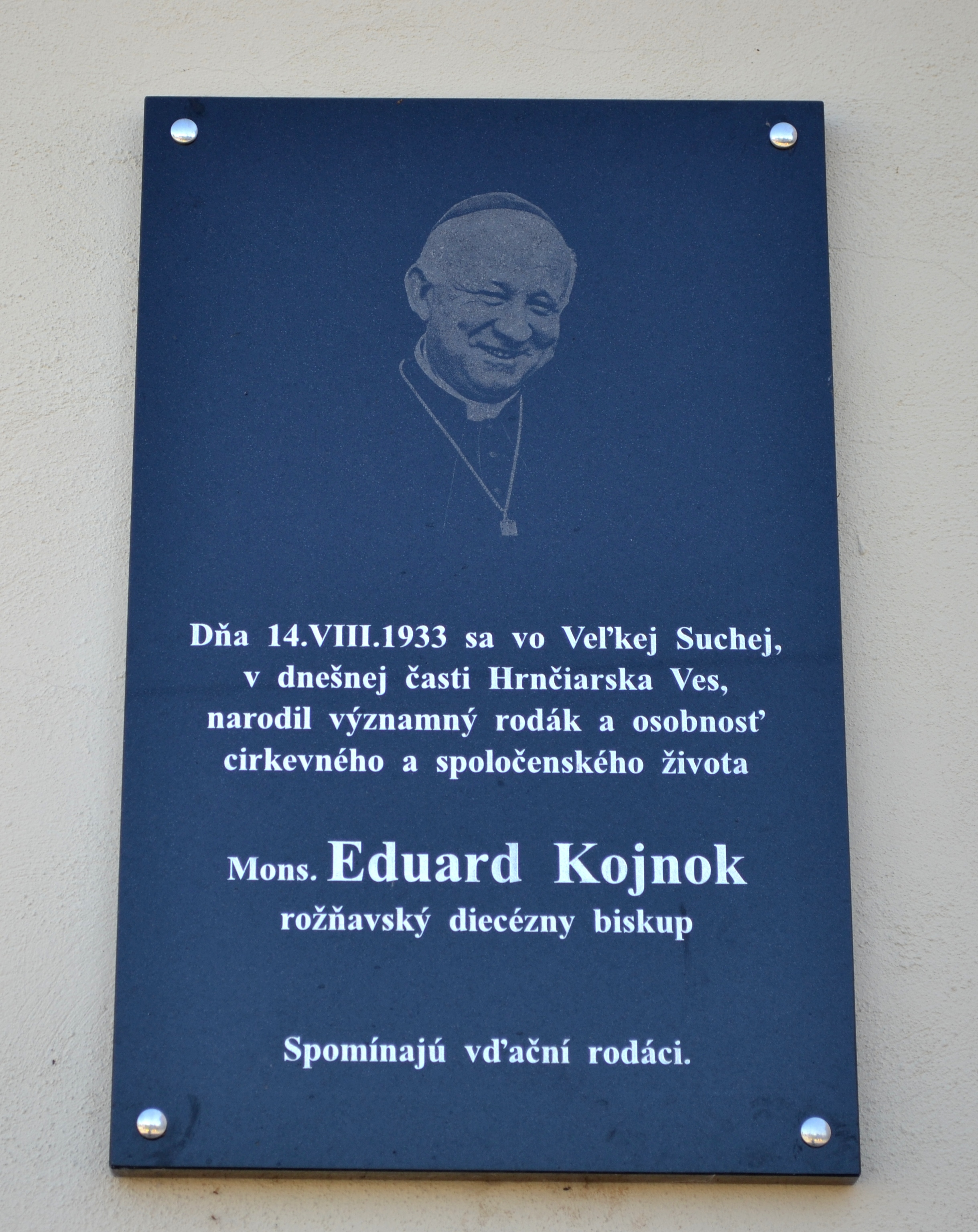
Memorial plaque of Bishop Edvard Kojnok

Eduard Kojnok (14 August 1933 in Veľká Suchá – 27 October 2011 in Rožňava) was the Roman Catholic bishop of the Roman Catholic Diocese of Rožňava, Slovakia.

Ordained to the priesthood in 1956, Kojnok became bishop of the Rožňava Diocese in 1990; he retired in 2008.
