= János Galgóczy =

Hungarian prelate

- Born: c. 1715; Diószeg, Kingdom of Hungary (today: Sládkovičovo, Slovakia)
- Died: April 6, 1776 (aged 61); Nagyszombat, Kingdom of Hungary (today: Trnava, Slovakia)

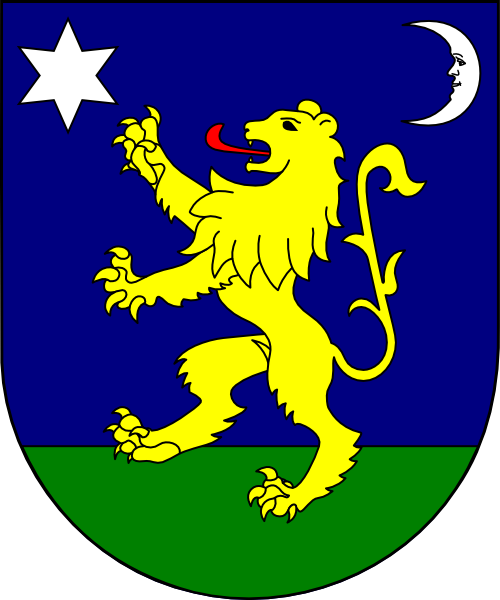
Coat of arms of

János Galgóczy de Sajógalgóc (c. 1715 – April 6, 1776) was a Hungarian prelate. Between 1744 and 1754 he served as Canon of the Roman Catholic Archdiocese of Esztergom. In 1776 he was appointed first Bishop of Rozsnyó (today: Rožňava), but died before taking charge. His successor was Count Antal Révay (1776–80).

Catholic Church titles
Preceded by diocese established	Bishop of Rozsnyó; 1776	Succeeded by Antal Révay
