= Gáň =

Gáň Gány
- Municipality
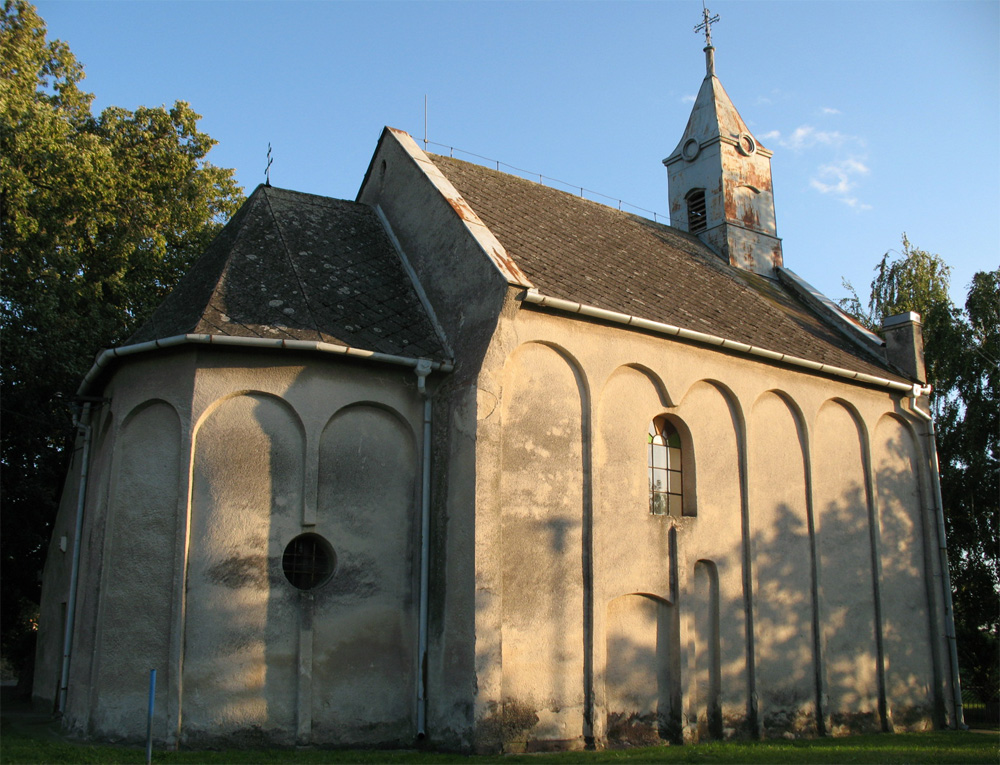

- Flag

- Location of Gáň in the Trnava Region Location of Gáň in Slovakia
- Coordinates: 48.23°N 17.72°E
- Country: Slovakia
- Region: Trnava Region
- District: Galanta District
- First mentioned: 1113

Area
  - Total: 6.17 km^{2} (2.38 sq mi)
- Elevation: 121 m (397 ft)

Population (2025)
  - Total: 864
- Time zone: UTC+1 (CET)
  - Summer (DST): UTC+2 (CEST)
- Postal code: 925 31
- Area code: +421 31
- Website: www.obecgan.sk

Gáň (Hungarian: Gány) is a village and municipality in Galanta District of the Trnava Region of south-west Slovakia.

== History ==
In historical records the village was first mentioned in 1113. Before the establishment of independent Czechoslovakia in 1918, it was part of Pozsony County within the Kingdom of Hungary.

== Geography ==
The municipality lies at an altitude of 121 metres (397 ft) and covers an area of 6.17 km^{2} (2.38 sq mi) (2025).

== Population ==
Population statistic (10 years)
Year	1995	2005	2015	2025
Count	610	696	795	864
Difference		+14.09%	+14.22%	+8.67%

Population statistic
Year	2024	2025
Count	885	864
Difference		−2.37%

It has a population of 864 people (31 December 2025).

=== Ethnicity ===
Census 2021 (1+ %)
Ethnicity	Number	Fraction
Slovak	811	93.21%
Hungarian	47	5.4%
Not found out	22	2.52%
Total	870	

In year 2021 was 870 people by ethnicity 811 as Slovak, 47 as Hungarian, 22 as Not found out, 3 as Russian, 2 as Czech, 2 as Other, 1 as Jewish, 1 as Ukrainian, 1 as Romani, 1 as Rusyn and 1 as Bulgarian.

Note on population: The difference values of population numbers in the table "Population statistic" and in the sections "Ethnicity" & "Religion" is caused by the use of various statistical methods.

=== Religion ===
Census 2021 (1+ %)
Religion	Number	Fraction
Roman Catholic Church	582	66.9%
None	232	26.67%
Not found out	22	2.53%
Evangelical Church	15	1.72%
Total	870	

In year 2021 was 870 people by religion 582 from Roman Catholic Church, 232 from None, 22 from Not found out, 15 from Evangelical Church, 5 from Greek Catholic Church, 3 from Christian Congregations in Slovakia, 2 from Calvinist Church, 2 from Islam, 2 from Other, 2 from Seventh-day Adventist Church, 1 from Old Catholic Church, 1 from Eastern Orthodox Church and 1 from Ad hoc movements.

== Genealogical resources ==
The records for genealogical research are available at the state archive "Statny Archiv in Bratislava, Slovakia"

- Roman Catholic church records (births/marriages/deaths): 1691-1921 (parish B)
- Lutheran church records (births/marriages/deaths): 1701-1826 (parish B)

== Notable people ==
- Vladimír Filo (1940–2015), Roman Catholic bishop

== See also ==
- List of municipalities and towns in Slovakia
