= János Simor =

Hungarian prelate

His Eminence János Simor
- Cardinal, Prince-Primate of Hungary; Archbishop of Esztergom
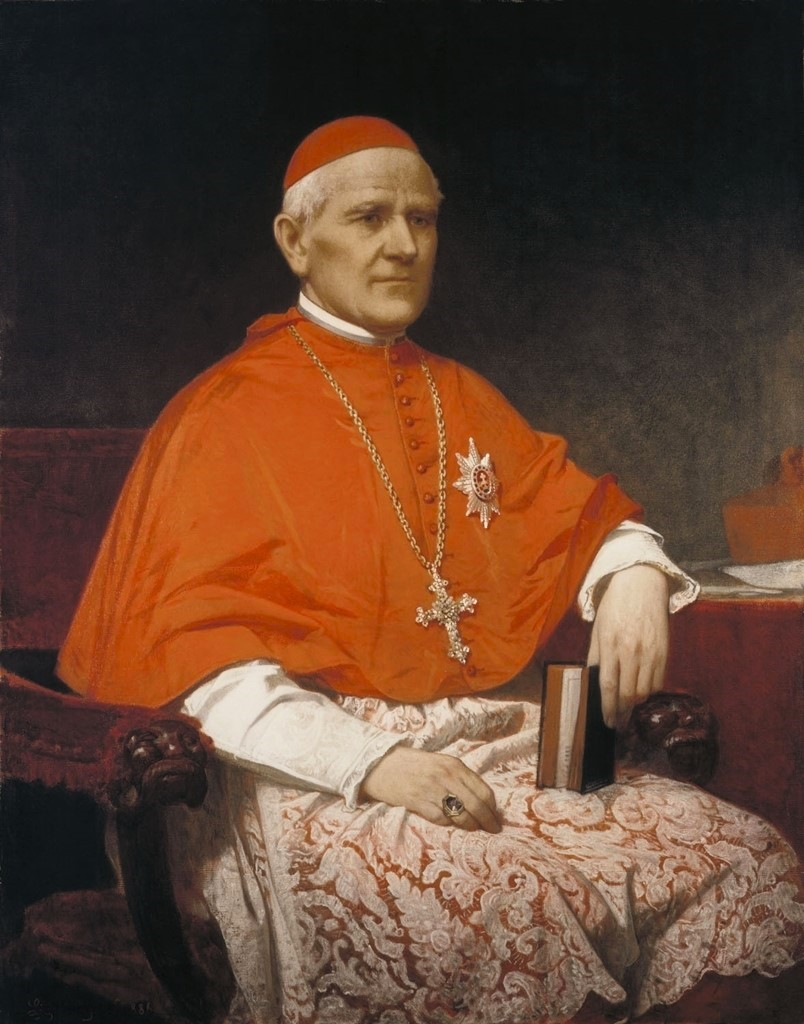
- Church: Roman Catholic Church
- Archdiocese: Esztergom
- See: Esztergom
- Appointed: 22 February 1867
- Term ended: 23 January 1891
- Predecessor: János Keresztély Scitovszký
- Successor: Kolos Ferenc Vaszary
- Other post: Cardinal-Priest of San Bartolomeo all'Isola (1874-91)
- Previous post: Bishop of Győr (1857-67)

Orders
- Ordination: 28 October 1836
- Consecration: 29 June 1857 by János Keresztély Scitovszký
- Created cardinal: 22 December 1873 by Pope Pius IX
- Rank: Cardinal-Priest

Personal details
- Born: János Simor; 23 August 1813 Székesfehérvár, Kingdom of Hungary
- Died: 23 January 1891 (aged 77) Esztergom, Kingdom of Hungary
- Buried: Esztergom Basilica
- Education: Pázmáneum
- Motto: Sub tuum praesidium

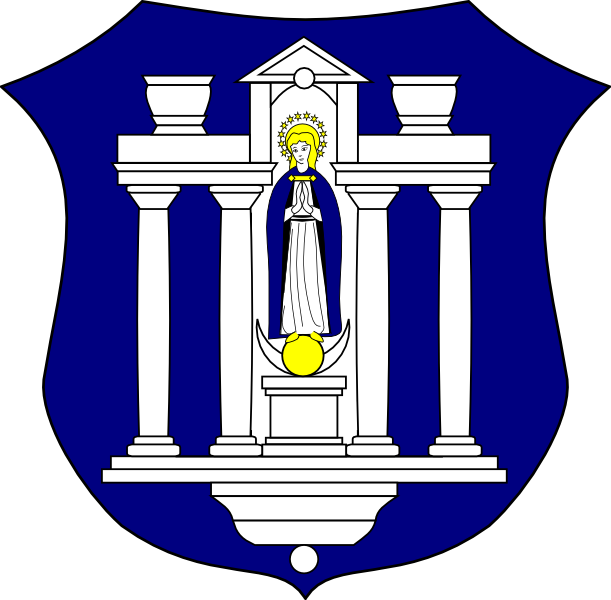
- Coat of arms

János Simor (23 August 1813 – 23 January 1891) was a Hungarian prelate of the Catholic Church who was Archbishop of Esztergom from 1867 until his death in 1891. He was previously Bishop of Győr from 1857 to 1867. He was made a cardinal in 1873.

== Biography ==
János Simor was born on 23 August 1813 in Székesfehérvár. He studied at the local gymnasium, the College of Bratislava, and the Seminary of Nagyszombat. He earned a doctorate in theology from the University of Vienna on 8 December 1841, and continued his studies at Collegium Pazmaneum in Vienna.

He was ordained a priest on 28 October 1836 and for twenty years combined pastoral work with teaching and academic administration. In 1854 Cardinal János Scitovszky dispatched him to Rome to make the case against expanding the planned Austrian concordat to include Hungary.

He was named Bishop of Győr on 19 March 1857 and received his episcopal consecration on 29 June 1857 from Scitovszky. He was promoted to Archbishop of Esztergom on 22 February 1867. On 8 June 1867, he crowned Emperor Franz Joseph with the crown of St. Stephen, the event for which he had commissioned Franz Liszt to write his Hungarian Coronation Mass. At the First Vatican Council (1869-1870) he aligned himself with the minority who opposed the dogma of papal infallibility, though he later wrote in its defence.

Pope Pius IX made him a cardinal priest on 22 December 1873 and he received the title of San Bartolomeo all'Isola on 15 June 1874. He participated in the conclave of 1878 that elected Pope Leo XIII. He received his red biretta on 22 September 1879 from Pope Leo.

He died on 23 January 1891 in Esztergom and was buried in the cathedral there.
