= Giuseppe Kirsten =

Giuseppe Kirsten C.S.Sp.
- Prefect of Benue
- Church: Catholic Church
- See: Prefecture Apostolic of Benue
- In office: 26 February 1937 – 1947
- Predecessor: (Prefecture established)
- Successor: James Hagan

Giuseppe Kirsten was a prelate of the Catholic Church who served as bishop of the Roman Catholic Diocese of Makurdi. He was appointed prefect in 1937. He died in 1947.
