= Diocese of Barica =

The Diocese of Barica (in Latin in: Dioecesis Baricensis) is a suppressed and titular see of the Roman Catholic Church.

== History ==
Barica, currently known as Barika, is a town in today's Algeria, which was the seat of a diocese in the Roman province of Numidia. The only known mention of the diocese comes from a 592 letter by the Pope Gregory I, which contains a reference of a certain Peter, who held the post of the Bishop of Barica at the time.

In 1933, Barica was restored as a titular seat by the Pope Pius XI.

== Known bishops ==
- Peter (fl. 592)
- Angelo Negri (1934 – 1949)
- Karl Walter Vervoort (1950 – 1979)
- Walter Theodor Jansen (1983 – 2004)
- Stanislav Stolárik (2004 – 2015)
- Michał Janocha (2015 – )
