= Adam Szentpétery =

Hungarian artist

- Born: 24 February 1956; Rožňava, Czechoslovakia
- Education: Academy of Fine Arts and Design in Bratislava
- Known for: Painting; Art education
- Movement: Geometric abstraction; abstract art

Szentpétery Ádám (Hungarian pronunciation: [ˈsɛntpeːtɛri ˈaːdaːm]; born 24 February 1956) is a Hungarian artist in Slovakia and the Department Head/Professor of the Studio of Contemporary Image at the Faculty of Arts at the Technical University of Košice, Slovakia. He is known primarily for his abstract painting with strong geometrically organized canvases in a highly original manner with a very intense but at the same time refined colorism.

== Life and career ==
Szentpétery was born in Rožňava, Czechoslovakia. From 1971 to 1975 he studied at the School of Applied Arts in Košice (department of graphic arts). From 1976 to 1982, he studied at the Academy of Fine Arts and Design in Bratislava at the studio of monumental painting in the course taught by Assoc. prof. Dezider Castiglione and Assoc. prof. Ivan Vychlopen. Since 1999 he is the head of the Studio of Contemporary Image at the Faculty of Arts at the Technical University in Košice (since 2004 – associate professor). In 2007 Szentpétery was awarded a “Munkácsy Mihály díj“ (i.e. state prize) in Budapest (Hungary). Nowadays Szentpétery lives and works in Rožňava and Košice.

=== Work ===
"When characterizing the works of the prominent Slovak painter Adam Szentpétery (born in 1956), from the very start it is necessary to emphasize that we shall communicate in the visual language of geometry with strong painting coding. Over the course of the 1980s, geometry became the matrix of his works onto which he places individual art outputs and links. The line, color, and surface are the primary building blocks of his picture system. Although in the course of decades Szentpétery has built a key monolithic painting programme in the field of geometric abstraction forming a unique contribution to the contemporary language of painting in Slovakia, it still remains a solitary phenomenon in the home environment." Vladimír Beskid,

=== Exhibitions ===
Since 1984 until now Szentpétery exhibited his works in numerous solo (21) and group exhibitions (142) around the world, mostly in the countries of the European Union, but his paintings also got exhibited as far as Japan, Korea or Taiwan. The complete list of solo and group exhibitions is available in Adam Szentpétery's catalog.

In 2018 / 2019 Szentpétery exhibited his most recent works at the Danubiana Meulensteen Art Museum.

=== Works in collections ===
- Východoslovenská galéria, VSG, Košice (Slovakia)
- Danubiana Meulensteen Art Museum, Bratislava (Slovakia)
- Východoslovenské múzeum, Košice (Slovakia)
- Banícke múzeum, Rožňava (Slovakia)
- Sbírka AVS, Prague (Czech Republic)
- Mestská galéria, Cottbus (Germany)
- Miskolci Galéria Miskolc (Hungary)
- Kortárs Magyar Galéria, Dunajská Streda (Slovakia)
- Oravská galéria, Dolný Kubín (Slovakia)
- Gyergyószárhegyi Megyei Alkotóközpont – Lăzarea (Romania)
- Beratzhausener Sammlung, Beratzhausen (Germany)
- Adam Galery, Brno (Czech Republic)
