= Cathedral of the Assumption of the Blessed Virgin Mary, Rožňava =

Cathedral of the Assumption
- Katedrála Nanebovzatia Panny Márie
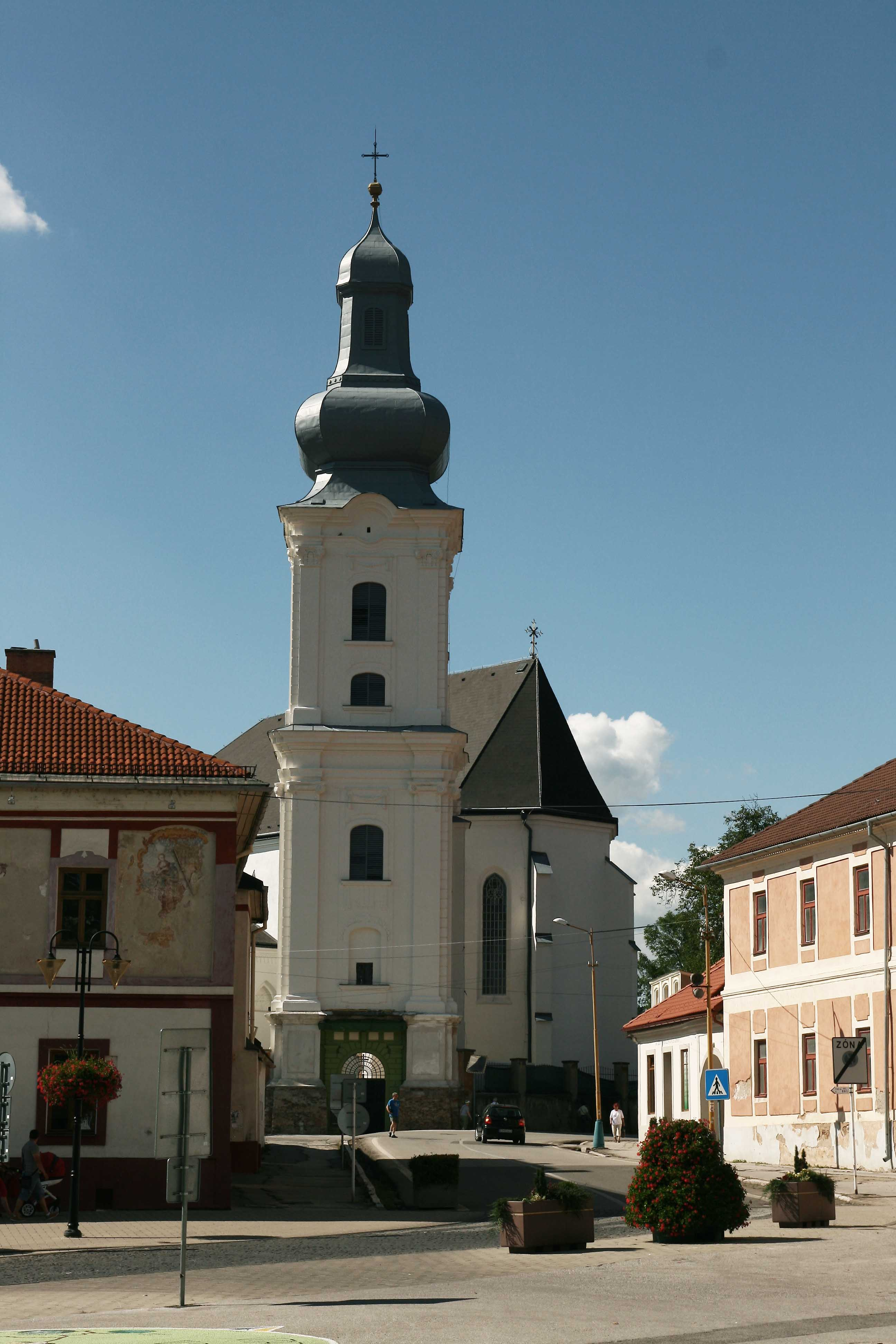

- Location in Slovakia
- 48°39′49″N 20°31′54″E
- Location: Rožňava
- Country: Slovakia
- Denomination: Roman Catholic

History
- Dedication: Assumption of Mary

Administration
- Diocese: Rožňava

Clergy
- Bishop: Stanislav Stolárik

Cathedral of the Assumption is a Roman Catholic cathedral in Rožňava, Slovakia. It is the seat of Bishop of Rožňava.

== History ==
The Gothic church was completed in 1304. At the turn of the 15th century, the church underwent comprehensive rebuilding. During the 16th and 17th centuries the church was used by both Catholics and Protestants. With the establishment of the Episcopal See of Rožňava on 13 March 1776, the church became the cathedral of the new diocese. As a result, extensive interior modifications were made. The church was originally built without a tower, which was added in the 19th century. It is a typical example of a regional style, so-called Gemer classicism.

== Rožňavská metercia ==
Rožňavská metercia is a late Gothic painting of St. Anne along with Mary, mother of Jesus and the child Jesus in the cathedral's interior. The background of the painting depicts processes of mining and processing of ore, which were activities undertaken in the region at the time.

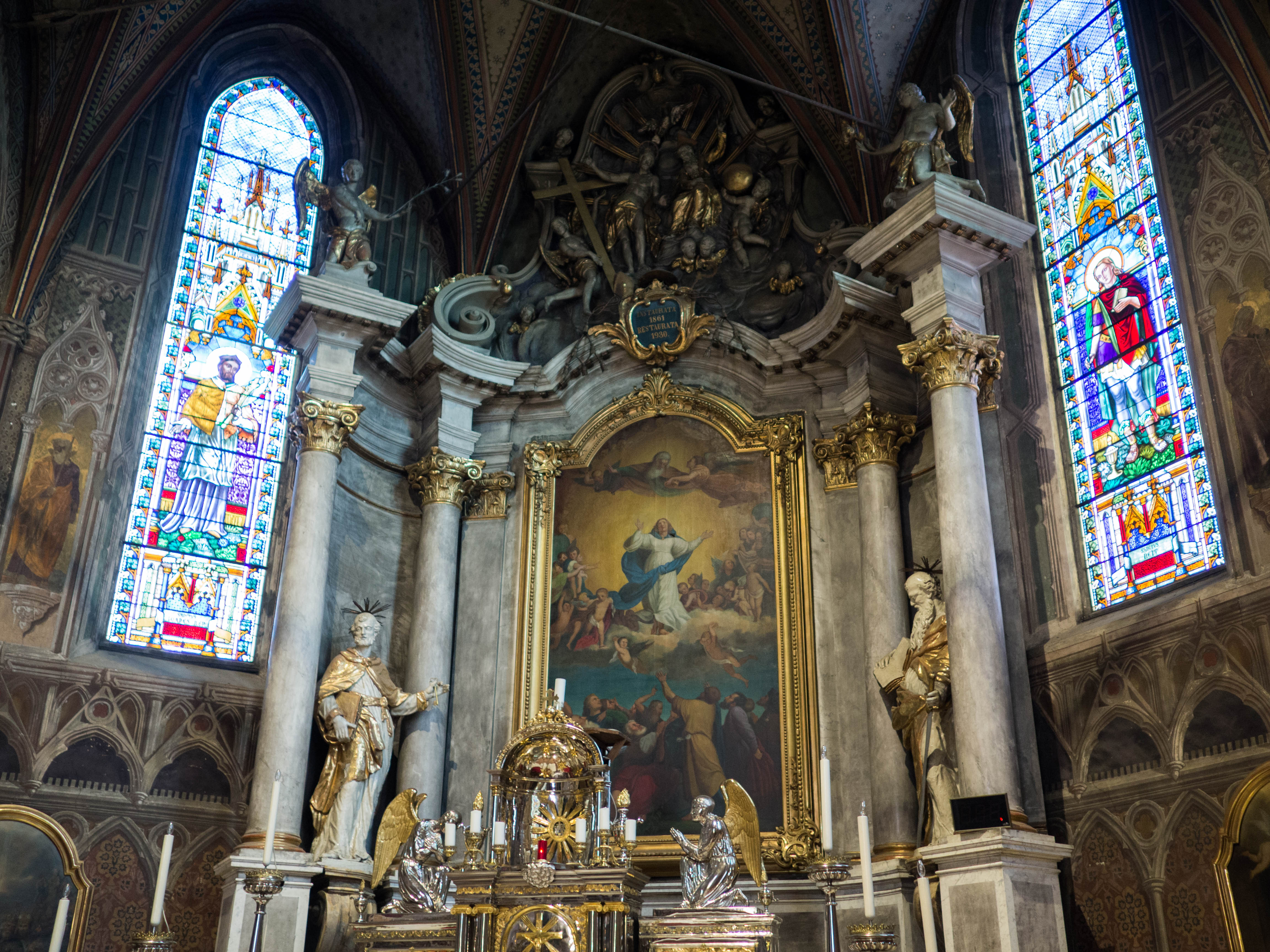
Baroque altar

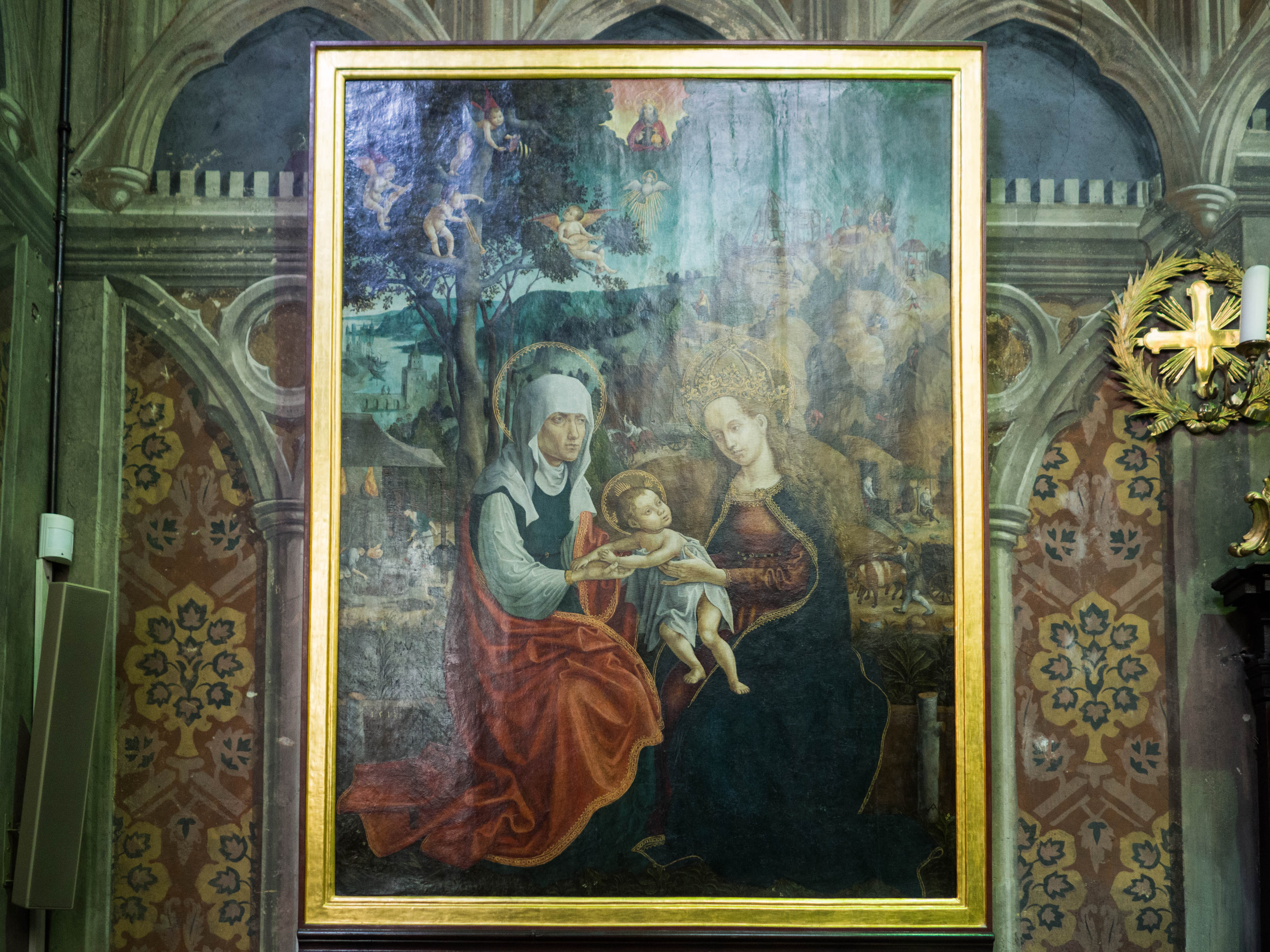
Rožňavská metercia, unique late gothic painting

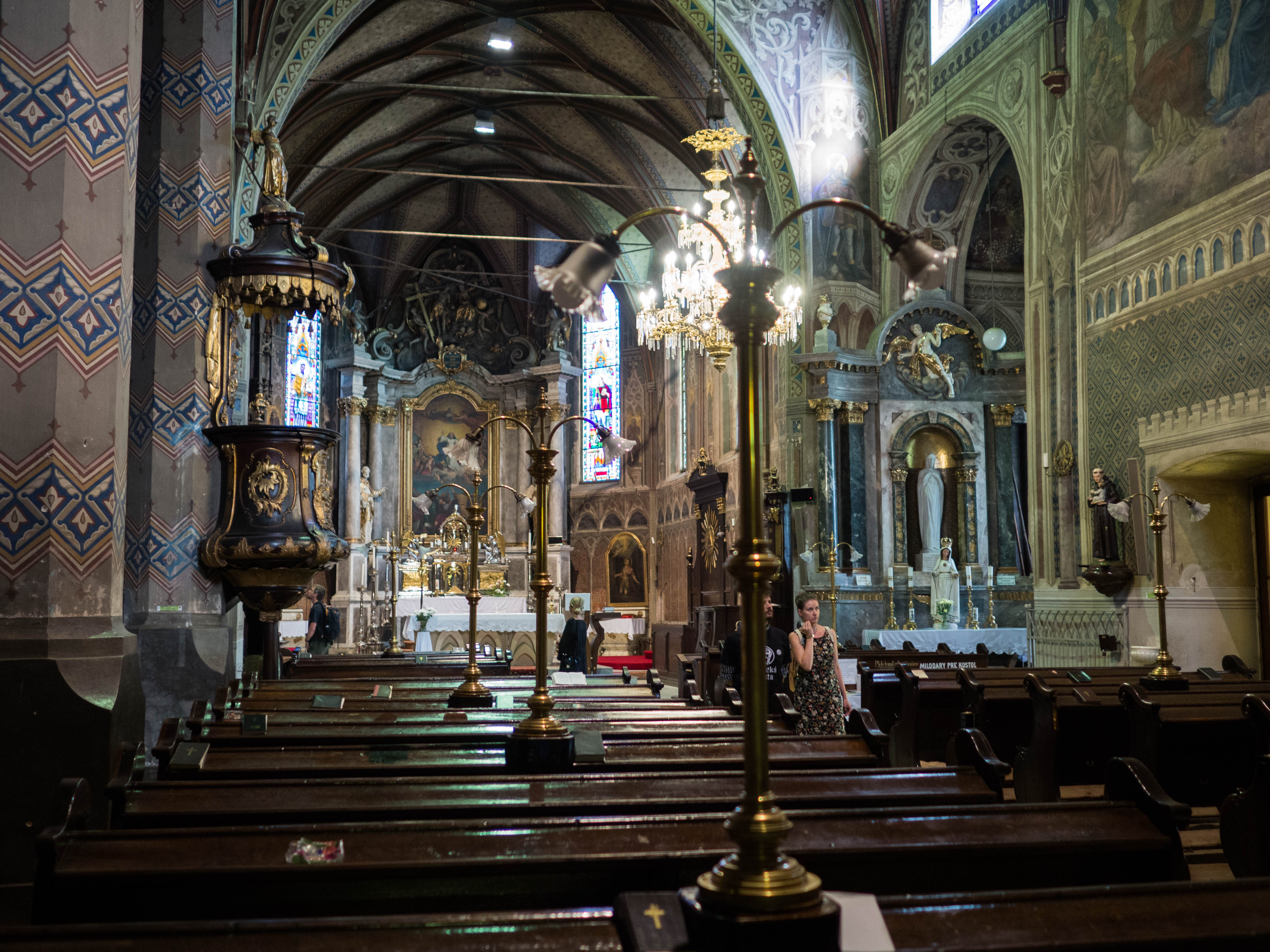

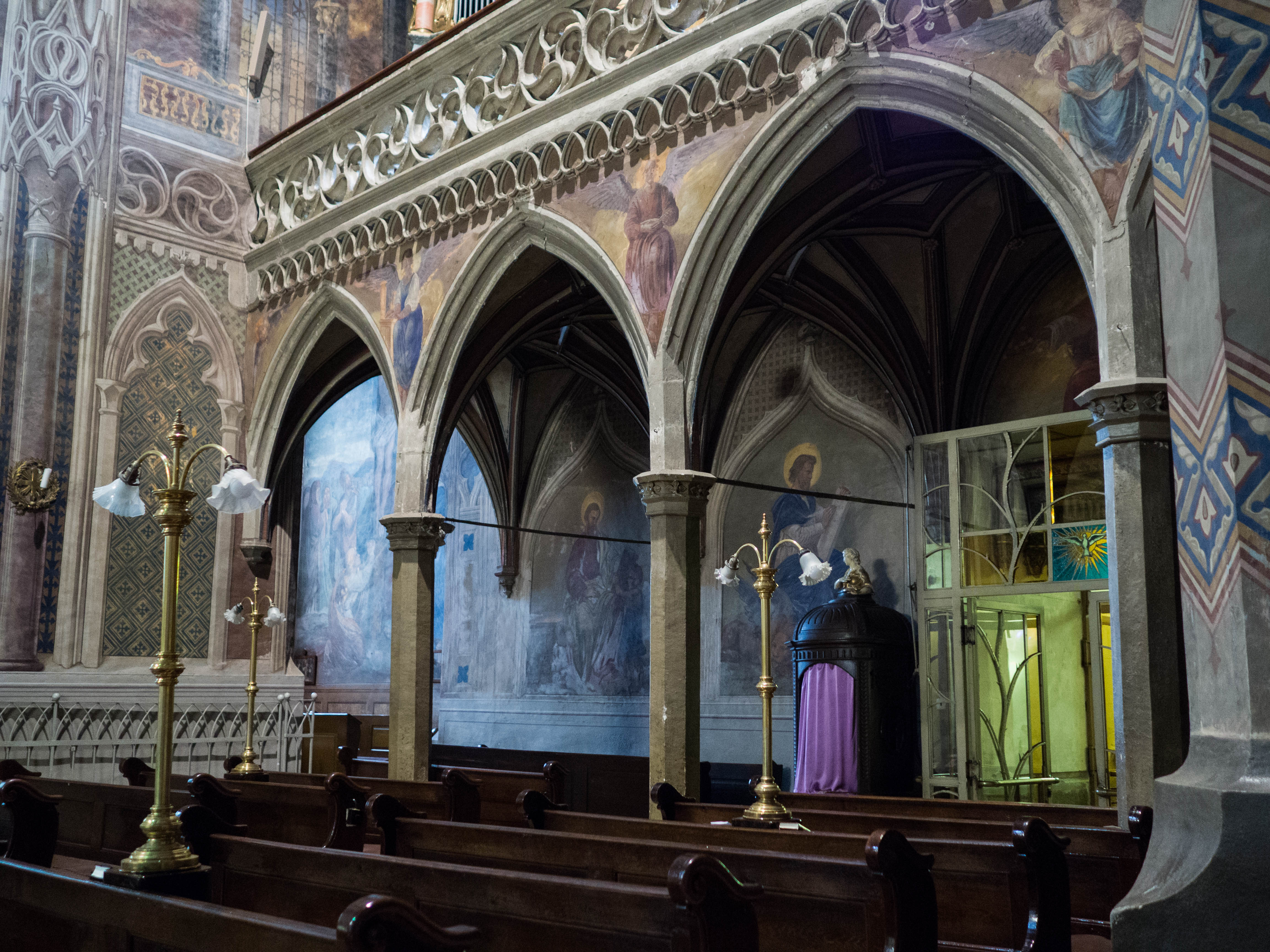

== Bells ==
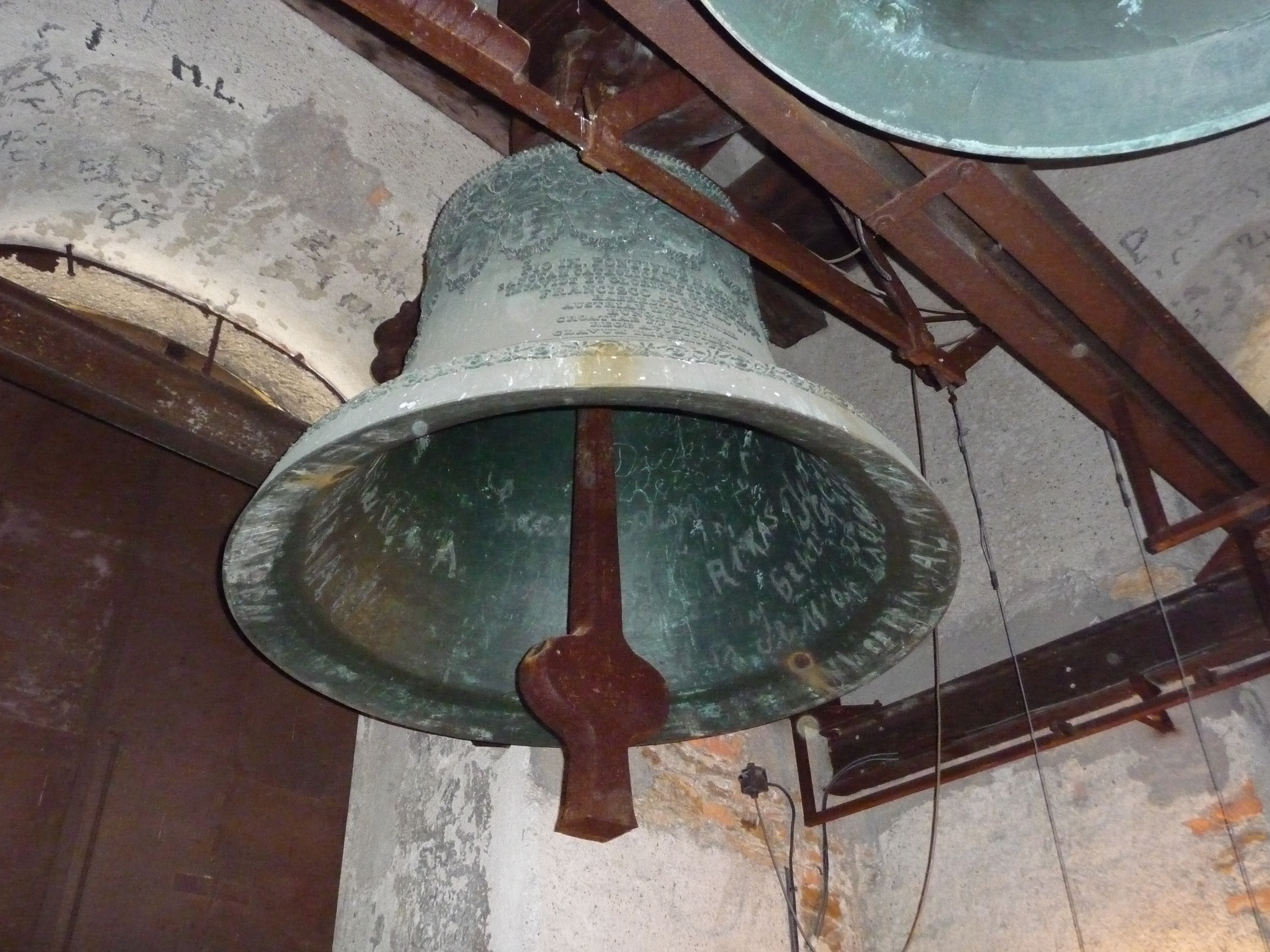
The bell Panna Mária (Virgin Mary)

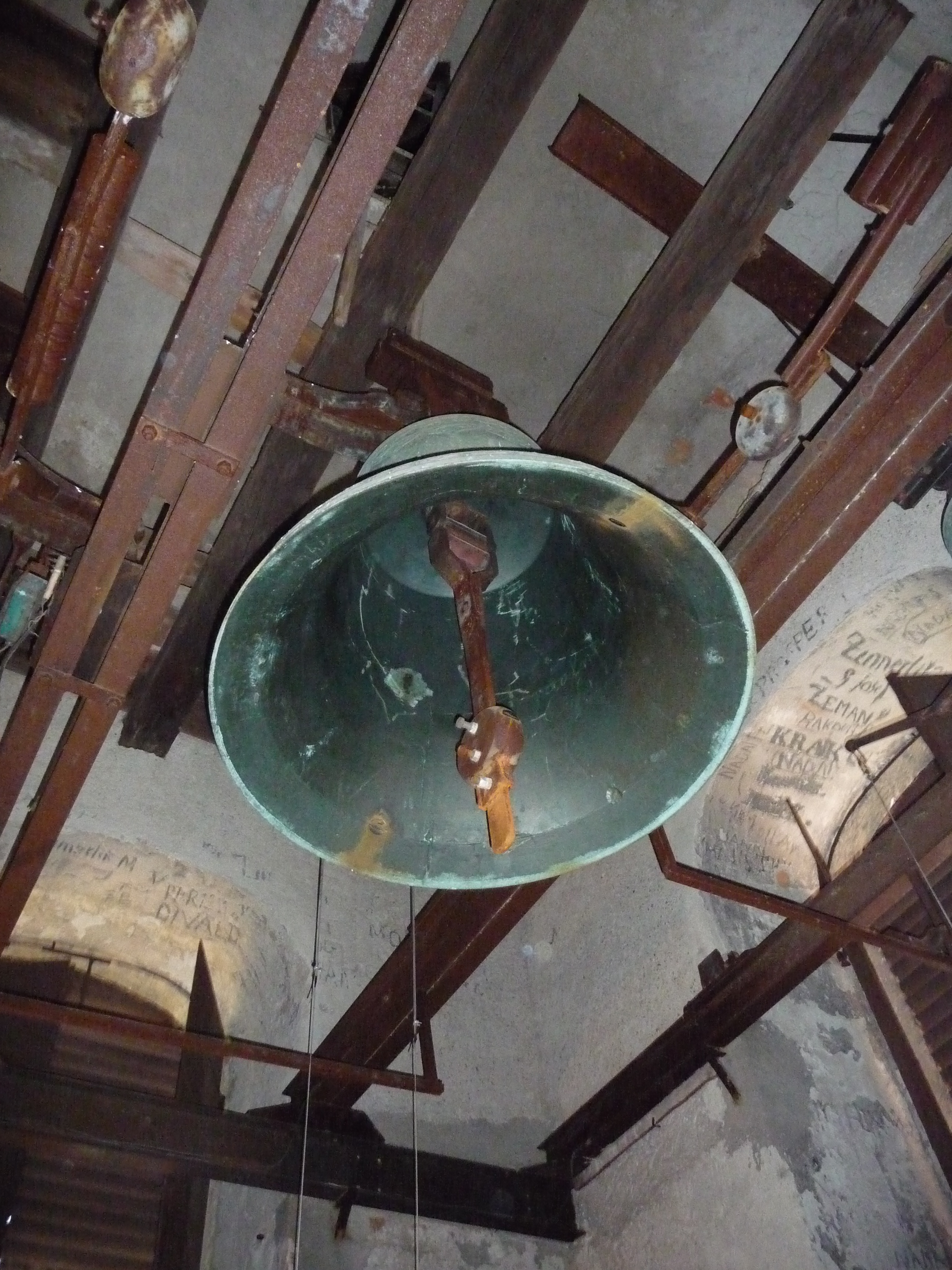
Bell Ján Nepomucký (John of Nepomuk)

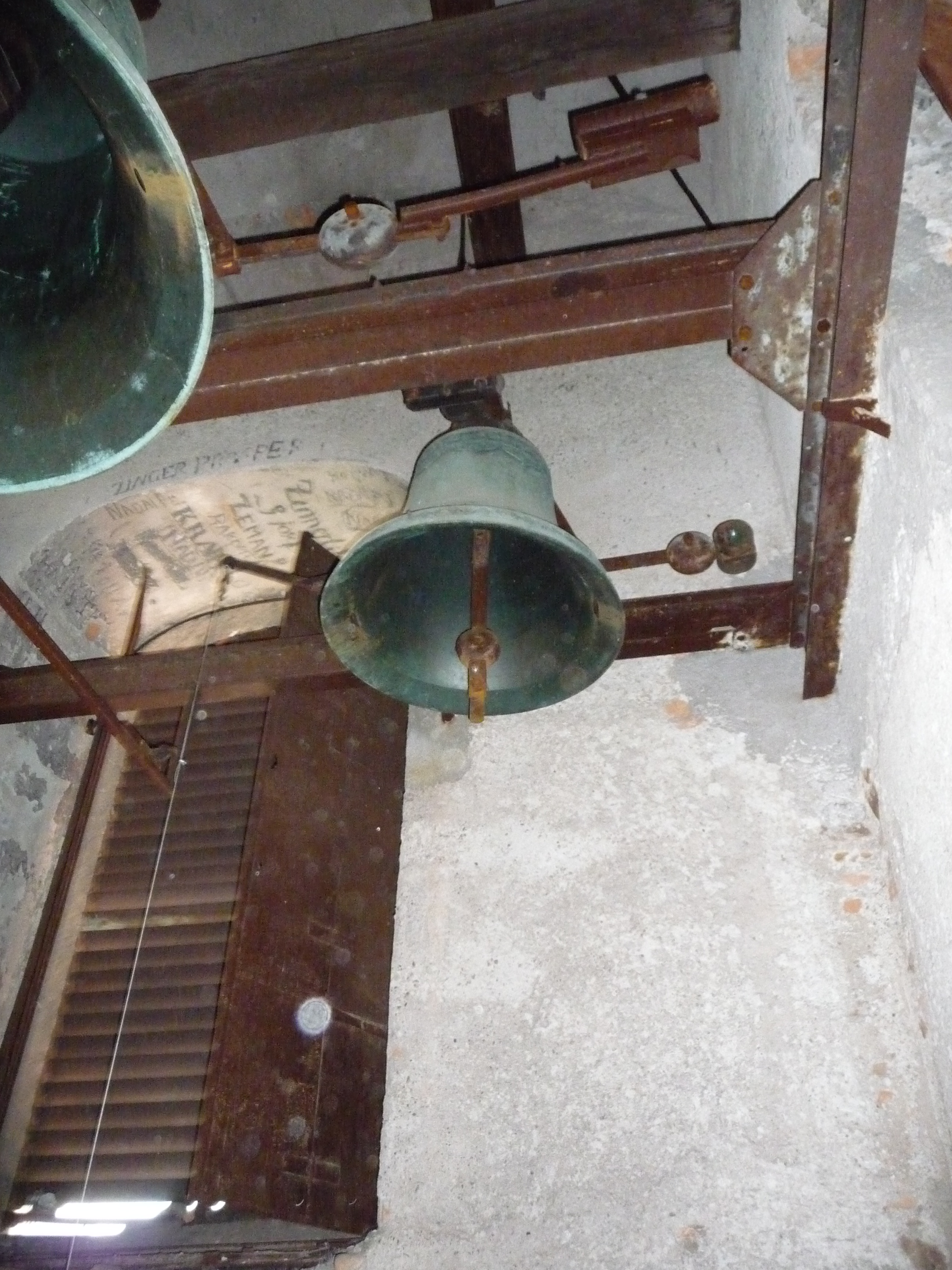
Bell Jozef (Joseph)
