= Diocese of Otukpo =

Roman Catholic diocese in Nigeria

Diocese of Otukpo Dioecesis Otukpoenus

Location
- Country: Nigeria
- Territory: a portion of Benue State
- Ecclesiastical province: Abuja
- Metropolitan: Abuja
- Coordinates: 07°13′00″N 08°09′00″E

Statistics
- Area: 13,015 km^{2} (5,025 sq mi)
- Population: Total; Catholics: (as of 2022); 4,683,225; 761,575 (16.3%)
- Parishes: 63

Information
- Denomination: Roman Catholic
- Rite: Latin Rite
- Established: July 10, 1995
- Cathedral: Saint Francis Cathedral in Otukpo
- Secular priests: 119

Current leadership
- Pope: Leo XIV
- Bishop: Most Rev. Michael Ekwoyi Apochi

Map
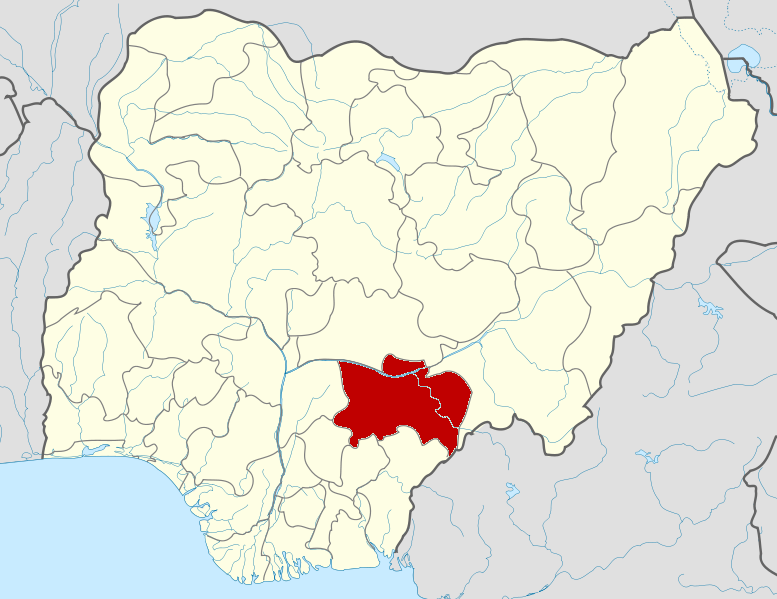
- The Diocese of Otukpo is located in a portion of Benue State which is shown here in red.

The Roman Catholic Diocese of Otukpo (Latin: Otukpoën(us)) is a diocese located in the city of Otukpo in the ecclesiastical province of Abuja in Nigeria.

== History ==
- July 10, 1995: Established as Diocese of Otukpo from the Diocese of Makurdi. The first bishop of the diocese is Late Most Revd. Fidelis Oga Orgah.

== Special churches ==
The Cathedral is St Francis’ Cathedral in Otukpo.

== Leadership ==
- Bishops of Otupko (Roman rite)
  - Bishop Fidelis oga Orgah (July 10, 1995 – December 7, 2000)
  - Bishop Michael Ekwoyi Apochi (since December 17, 2002)

== See also ==
- Roman Catholicism in Nigeria

== Sources ==
- GCatholic.org Information
- Catholic Hierarchy
