= Athanasius Atule Usuh =

Roman Catholic bishop

- Bishop of Makurdi
- Church: Catholic Church
- Diocese: Diocese of Makurdi
- In office: 2 June 1989 – 28 March 2015
- Predecessor: Donal Joseph Murray
- Successor: Wilfred Chikpa Anagbe

Orders
- Ordination: 19 December 1971
- Consecration: 6 January 1988 by Pope John Paul II

Personal details
- Born: 2 May 1942 Mbagena (near Katsina-Ala), Benue Province, Colony and Protectorate of Nigera, British Empire
- Died: 14 July 2016 (aged 74)

Athanasius Atule Usuh (2 May 1942 – 14 July 2016) was a Roman Catholic bishop.

Ordained to the priesthood in 1971, Usuh served as coadjutor bishop of the Roman Catholic Diocese of Makurdi, Nigeria from 1987 to 1989, then as bishop there until 2015.
