= Donal Joseph Murray =

Roman Catholic bishop

Donal Joseph Murray C.S.Sp.
- Bishop of Makurdi
- Church: Catholic Church
- Diocese: Diocese of Makurdi
- In office: 11 January 1968 – 2 June 1989
- Predecessor: James Hagan
- Successor: Athanasius Atule Usuh

Orders
- Ordination: 7 April 1946
- Consecration: 29 March 1968 by Edward Ellis

Personal details
- Born: 11 February 1918 Limerick, Irish Republic
- Died: 14 August 1999 (aged 81) Dublin, Ireland

Donal Joseph Murray (born 1918 in Limerick) was an Irish prelate of the Catholic Church who served as bishop of the Roman Catholic Diocese of Makurdi. He was appointed bishop in 1968. He died in 1999.
