= Diocese of Rožňava =

Roman Catholic diocese in Slovakia

Diocese of Rožňava Dioecesis Rosnaviensis Dieceze Roznavska

Catholic
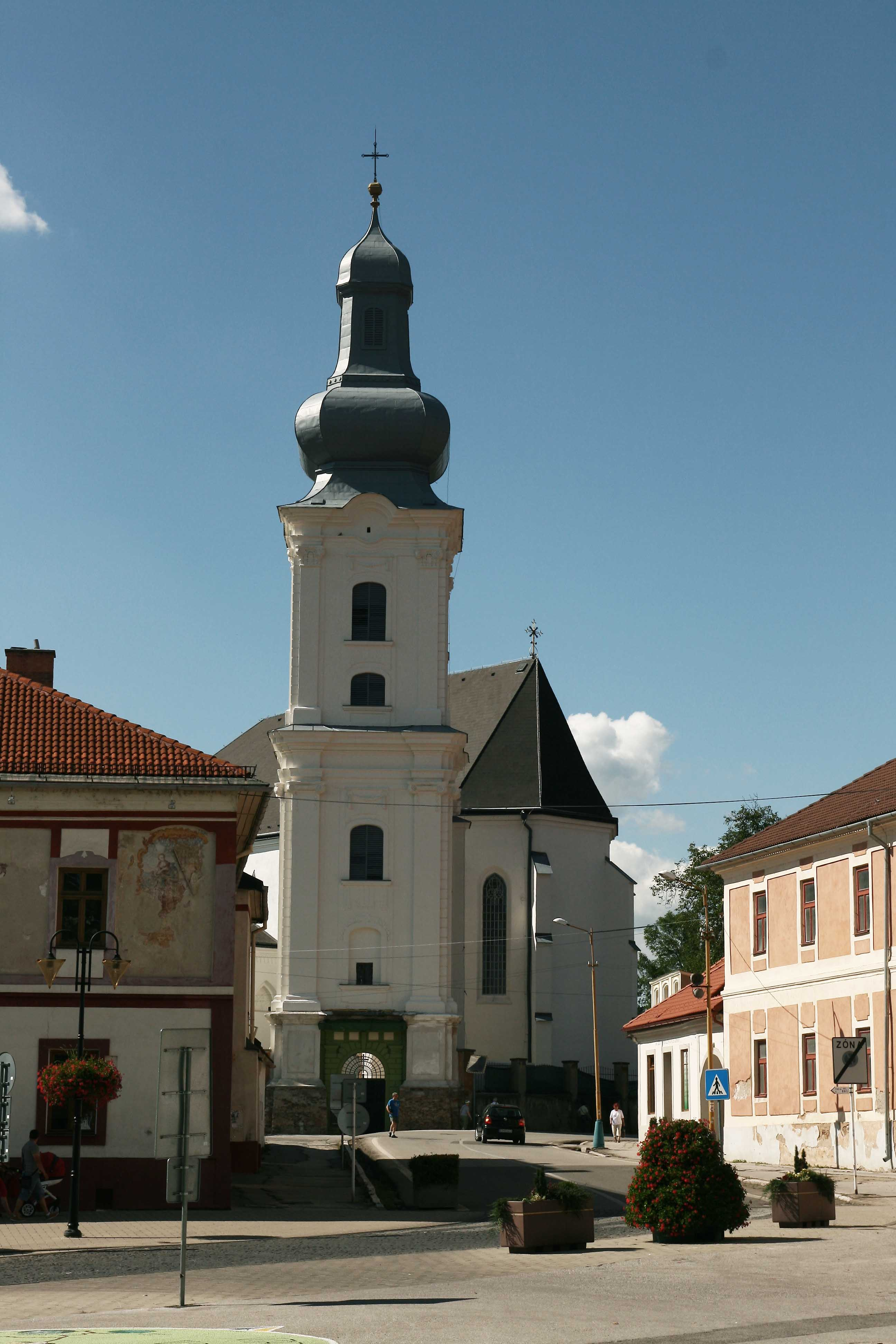
- Cathedral of the Assumption of the Blessed Virgin Mary, Rožňava

- Coat of arms

Location
- Country: Slovakia
- Metropolitan: Archdiocese of Košice

Statistics
- Area: 7,000 km^{2} (2,700 sq mi)
- Population: Total; Catholics: (as of 2020); ▲441,139; ▲208,233 (▼47.2%)

Information
- Denomination: Roman Catholic
- Established: 13 March 1776
- Cathedral: Cathedral of the Assumption of the Blessed Virgin Mary, Rožňava

Current leadership
- Pope: Leo XIV
- Bishop: Stanislav Stolárik

Map
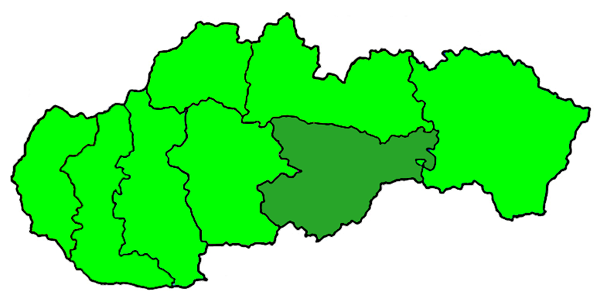
- Map of the Diocese

The Diocese of Rožňava (Slovak: Rožňavská diecéza, Latin: Dioecesis Rosnaviensis) is a Latin Church diocese of the Catholic Church in southern Slovakia. It covers central and eastern parts of the Banská Bystrica Region and western parts of the Košice Region. Its seat is in Rožňava, covers an area of 7,000 km^{2} with 343,352 people of which 58% are of Catholic faith (2004).

Auxiliary Bishop Stanislav Stolárik, Titular Bishop of Barica, who until then had been serving as Auxiliary Bishop of the Roman Catholic Archdiocese of Košice, in Košice, Slovakia, was appointed Bishop of the Diocese of Rožňava on Saturday, 21 March 2015, by Pope Francis, succeeding Bishop Emeritus Vladimír Filo, who himself had succeeded Bishop Emeritus Eduard Kojnok in 2008.

== History ==
The diocese was established by Maria Theresa on 13 March 1776 as a suffragan of the Archdiocese of Esztergom. It was then known by its German name diocese of Rosenau, or Hungarian name diocese of Rozsnyó. In 1776 János Galgóczy was appointed first Bishop of Rosenau, but died before taking charge. His successor, Count Antal Révay (1776–80), caused the church to be restored and the high altar to be renovated.

In 1804 it became a suffragan see of the new Archdiocese of Eger.

Among successors of Révay were: János Scitovszky (1827–38), later Bishop of Funfkirchen and Archbishop of Gran; Béla Bartakovics (1845–50), later archbishop of Eger.

Owing to strained relations between the Vatican and Czechoslovakia, the diocese remained vacant from 1920 to 1990, under apostolic administrators, except for the period between 1939 and 1945, when it was governed by a residential bishop following the return (1938–1945) of the territory to Hungarian rule (after the First Vienna Award).

On 30 December 1977, it was taken from the former metropolitan, and became part of the newly created Slovak ecclesiastical province together with the metropolitan Diocese of Trnava.

The last change of metropolitan took place on 31 March 1995 when it was changed to the newly elevated Archdiocese of Košice.

== List of bishops ==
Name	Start of the period	End of the period	Note
Antal Révay	19 April 1776	1780	Appointed as bishop of Nyitra
Antal Andrássy	17 December 1780	†12 November 1799	
Ferenc Szányi	1801	†1810	
László Esterházy	1810	† 11 September 1824.	
Ferenc Lajcsák	1825	1827	Appointed as bishop of Nagyvárad
János Scitovszky	21 January 1828.	18 February 1839	Appointed as bishop of Pécs
Domonkos Zichy	1840	1842	Appointed as bishop of Veszprém
Béla Bartakovics	1844	1850	Appointed as archbishop of Eger
István Kollárcsik	1850	† 18 July 1869	
György Schopper	17 January 1872.	†10 April 1895	
János Ivánkovics	1896	12 October 1904	removed from position
Lajos Balás	17 October 1905	†18 September 1920.	
Jüzsef Csárszky	1925	1925	apostolic administrator
Mihály Bubnics	1925	†22 February 1945	apostolic administrator (1925–1939), later Diocesan Bishop
Róbert Pobožný	25 July 1949	† 9 June 1972	apostolic administrator
Eduard Kojnok	14 February 1990	27 December 2008	
Vladimír Filo	27 December 2008	†18 August 2015	
Stanislav Stolárik	21 March 2015		
