= Rumanová =

Village and municipality in Slovakia

Rumanová Románfalva
- Municipality
- Flag

- Location of Rumanová in the Nitra Region Location of Rumanová in Slovakia
- Coordinates: 48.33°N 17.87°E
- Country: Slovakia
- Region: Nitra Region
- District: Nitra District
- First mentioned: 1369

Area
  - Total: 11.65 km^{2} (4.50 sq mi)
- Elevation: 157 m (515 ft)

Population (2025)
  - Total: 855
- Time zone: UTC+1 (CET)
  - Summer (DST): UTC+2 (CEST)
- Postal code: 951 37
- Area code: +421 37
- Vehicle registration plate (until 2022): NR
- Website: www.rumanova.sk

Rumanová (Hungarian: Románfalva) is a village and municipality in the Nitra District in western central Slovakia, in the Nitra Region.

== History ==
In historical records the village was first mentioned in 1156 under the name Tomanová.

In 1994, a 4.3 kg H5 chondrite meteorite was discovered in a nearby grain field by Jozef Tehlár during a harvest. The majority of the meteorite is currently housed in the mineralogy collection of the Slovak National Museum in Bratislava. A local theatre company takes its name from the meteorite.

== Geography ==
The municipality lies at an altitude of 157 metres (515 ft) and covers an area of 11.65 km^{2} (4.50 sq mi) (2025).

== Population ==
Population statistic (10 years)
Year	1995	2005	2015	2025
Count	813	785	820	855
Difference		−3.44%	+4.45%	+4.26%

Population statistic
Year	2024	2025
Count	859	855
Difference		−0.46%

It has a population of 855 people (31 December 2025).

=== Ethnicity ===
Census 2021 (1+%)
Ethnicity	Number	Fraction
Slovak	802	97.68%
Not found out	16	1.94%
Czech	9	1.09%
Total	821	

In year 2021 was 821 people by ethnicity 802 as Slovak, 16 as Not found out, 9 as Czech, 3 as Hungarian, 2 as Russian and 2 as Other.

Note on population: The difference values of population numbers in the table "Population statistic" and in the sections "Ethnicity" & "Religion" is caused by the use of various statistical methods.

=== Religion ===
Census 2021 (1+%)
Religion	Number	Fraction
Roman Catholic Church	653	79.54%
None	145	17.66%
Not found out	9	1.1%
Total	821	

In year 2021 was 821 people by religion 653 from Roman Catholic Church, 145 from None, 9 from Not found out, 5 from Evangelical Church, 3 from Christian Congregations in Slovakia, 3 from Greek Catholic Church, 1 from Old Catholic Church, 1 from Calvinist Church and 1 from Ad hoc movements.
