= William Avenya =

Nigerian prelate of the Catholic Church (born 1955)

His Excellency, The Most Reverend William Avenya
- Bishop of the Diocese of Gboko
- Church: Catholic; Latin Church
- Diocese: Gboko
- Appointed: 29 December 2012
- Installed: 24 February 2013
- Previous posts: Auxiliary Bishop of Makurdi, Nigeria (2008‍–‍2013); Titular bishop of Thucca in Mauretania (2008‍–‍2013); Apostolic administrator of Katsina-Ala (2020‍–‍2022)

Personal details
- Born: William Amove Avenya; 21 June 1955 (age 71) Ishangev Tiev, Konshisha, Benue State, Nigeria
- Occupation: Clergyman
- Education: St Augustine's Major Seminary Jos; University of Manchester; Galilee International Management Institute

Ordination history
History
Episcopal consecration
- Principal consecrator: Athanasius Atule Usuh
- Co-consecrators: John Olorunfemi Onaiyekan, Renzo Fratini

Styles of William Amove Avenya
- Reference style: The Most Reverend
- Spoken style: Your Excellency
- Religious style: Monsignor

William Avenya (born 21 June 1955) is a Nigerian prelate of the Catholic Church, who is the bishop of the Latin Church diocese of Gboko in Nigeria. Avenya is the first bishop of the diocese since its creation on 29 December 2012. He served as secretary general of the Association of Episcopal Conferences of Anglophone West Africa (AECAWA).

== Early life and education ==
William Amove Avenya was born on 21 June 1955 in Ishangev Tiev, Konshisha Local Government Area, Benue State, Nigeria. He attended Mount Saint Gabriel's Secondary School in Makurdi and completed ecclesiastical studies at St Augustine's Major Seminary Jos (1975–1981). He studied at the University of Manchester (1989–1990), pursuing a master's degree in education and a PhD. In 2000, he earned a diploma in management and development of non-governmental organizations at Galilee International Management Institute, Israel.

== Religious life ==
Avenya was ordained a priest on 30 May 1981. He was appointed auxiliary bishop of Makurdi, Nigeria, on 28 November 2008. He was appointed titular bishop of Thucca in Mauretania on 28 November 2008 and ordained a bishop on 24 January 2009 in Makurdi, Benue. He was appointed bishop of the diocese of Gboko on 29 December 2012 by Pope Benedict XVI and installed on 24 February 2013.

On 17 February 2020, after the death of Peter Iorzuul Adoboh, the bishop of the diocese of Katsina-Ala, Avenya was appointed apostolic administrator of Katsina-Ala. He served in that role until a new bishop, appointed by Pope Francis, was installed in July 2022.
