= Nigerian Educational Research and Development Council =

Curriculum development and regulatory body Nigeria

Nigerian Educational Research and Development Council (NERDC)

Agency overview
- Formed: 31 October 1988
- Preceding agency: National Educational Research Council
- Type: Regulatory
- Jurisdiction: Federal Republic of Nigeria
- Headquarters: Abuja
- Minister responsible: Adamu Adamu
- Parent agency: Federal Ministry of Education
- Website: www.nerdc.gov.ng

The Nigerian Educational Research and Development Council (NERDC), is an agency of the Federal Government of Nigeria charged with the responsibility of implementing educational policies in Nigeria. It was formally recognised by law in 1988 by an enabling Decree No. 53 (now ACT No. 53) which merged four Educational Research and Development bodies into one organisation.

== History ==
NERDC has been around since 1964, when it was named as the Nigeria Educational Research Council (NERC). The late Chief Federal Adviser on Education, Chief S.O.Awokoye, organized the National Conference on Curriculum Development from 8 to 12 September 1969, by a group of professionals from the Federal Ministry of Education.

Following the conference, recommendations for NERC's statutory status were made in order to facilitate and improve the execution of the curriculum conference's principal recommendations, resulting in Decree No. 31 of August 1972, which gave legal basis to NERC's foundation.

In 1987, the National Language Centre, the National Book Development Council, and the Comparative Education Study and Adaptation Centre (CESAC) were merged with the NERC in a bid to reduce the cost and duplication of responsibilities leading to the adoption of a name change from NERC to NERDC.

The name change became fully effective in I988 when the Nigerian Educational Research and Development Council Decree (Decree No.53 of 1988), was promulgated.
