= Stanislav Stolárik =

Slovak Catholic prelate (born 1955)

His Excellency Stanislav Stolárik
- Bishop of Rožňava
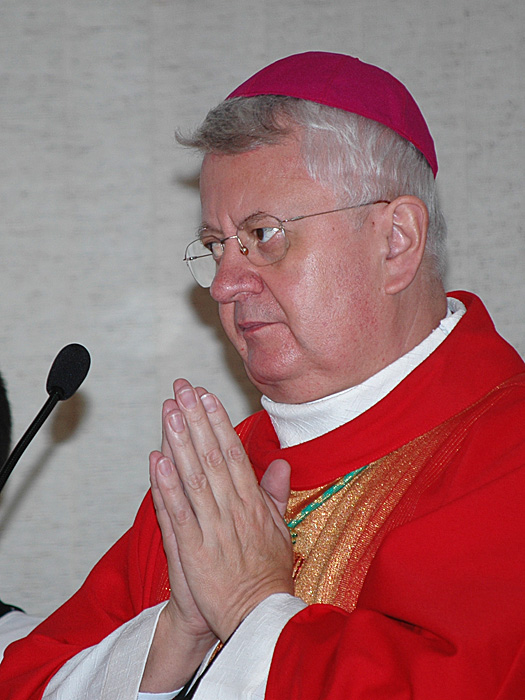
- Stolárik in 2010
- Church: Roman Catholic
- Appointed: 21 March 2015
- Predecessor: Vladimír Filo
- Previous post: Auxiliary bishop of Košice (2004–2015)

Orders
- Ordination: 11 June 1978
- Consecration: 20 March 2004 by Alojz Tkáč

Personal details
- Born: 27 February 1955 (age 71) Rožňava, Czechoslovakia
- Motto: In virtute Spiritus Sancti cum Maria (Latin for 'In the power of the Holy Spirit with Mary')
- Coat of arms

Styles of Stanislav Stolárik
- Reference style: His Excellency; The Most Reverend
- Spoken style: Your Excellency
- Religious style: Bishop

Stanislav Stolárik (born 27 February 1955) is a Slovak prelate of the Roman Catholic Church. He is the Bishop of the Roman Catholic Diocese of Rožňava.

== Biography ==
Stanislav Stolárik was born on 27 February 1955 in Rožňava as a seventh of eight children. He grew up in Košice and studied theology at the Comenius University. Stolárik was ordained priest in 1978. He was active as a chaplain in Trebišov, Humenné and Prešov. In 1984 he became the parish priest in Obišovce and subsequently in Humenné, Čaňa and Prešov.

On 26 February 2004, Stolárik was named Auxiliary Bishop of Košice and a Titular Bishop of Barica by the Pope John Paul II. He was consecrated by the Archbishop of Košice Alojz Tkáč at the Cathedral of St. Elizabeth. On 16 May 2015 he succeeded Vladimír Filo as the bishop of Rožňava.
