= James Hagan (bishop) =

Roman Catholic bishop

James Hagan C.S.Sp.
- Bishop of Makurdi
- Church: Catholic Church
- Diocese: Diocese of Makurdi
- In office: 20 March 1948 – 29 March 1966
- Predecessor: Giuseppe Kirsten
- Successor: Donal Joseph Murray
- Other post: Titular Bishop of Horrea Coelia (1966-1970)

Orders
- Ordination: 28 October 1928
- Consecration: 8 May 1960 by Pope John XXIII

Personal details
- Born: 23 March 1904 Leadgate, County Durham, United Kingdom of Great Britain and Ireland
- Died: 12 December 1976 (aged 72)

James Hagan (born 23 March 1904 in Leadgate, County Durham – 12 December 1976) was an English prelate of the Catholic Church who served as bishop of the Roman Catholic Diocese of Makurdi. He was appointed bishop in 1960. He died in 1976.
