= Michael Ekwoyi Apochi =

Nigerian Roman Catholic bishop (born 1960)

- Bishop of Otukpo
- Church: Catholic Church
- Diocese: Diocese of Otukpo
- Appointed: 17 December 2002
- Predecessor: Fidelis oga Orgah

Orders
- Ordination: 19 July 1986
- Consecration: 23 February 2003 by John Onaiyekan

Personal details
- Born: 6 August 1960 (age 65) Ichama (in present-day Okpokwu LGA), Benue Province, Federation of Nigeria, British Empire

Michael Ekwoyi Apochi (born 6 August 1960 in Ichama) is a Nigerian prelate of the Catholic Church who served as bishop of the Roman Catholic Diocese of Otukpo. He was appointed bishop in 2002.

== See also ==
- Catholic Church in Nigeria
- List of Catholic dioceses in Nigeria
