= Košická Belá =

Košická Belá Kassabéla
- Municipality
- Flag

- Location of Košická Belá in the Košice Region Location of Košická Belá in Slovakia
- Coordinates: 48.80°N 21.12°E
- Country: Slovakia
- Region: Košice Region
- District: Košice-okolie District
- First mentioned: 1297

Area
  - Total: 39.57 km^{2} (15.28 sq mi)
- Elevation: 370 m (1,210 ft)

Population (2025)
  - Total: 1,005
- Time zone: UTC+1 (CET)
  - Summer (DST): UTC+2 (CEST)
- Postal code: 446 5
- Area code: +421 55
- Vehicle registration plate (until 2022): KS
- Website: www.kosickabela.sk

Košická Belá (1297 flimen Bela, 1397 villa Johannis, 1440 Janussffalwa, 1580 Hansdorff, 1650 Bela) (German: Hansdorf; Hungarian: Kassabéla) is a village and large municipality in Košice-okolie District in the Košice Region of eastern Slovakia.

== History ==
Historically, the first written mention of the village was in 1297 as Villa Johannis when German settlers came here. To the municipality also belonged the villages of Košické Hámre, Malý Folkmar and Ružín, which were flooded when the water reservoir Ružín was filled in 1969.

The name of the village is derived from the stream Belá that flows through it.

== Geography ==
The village lies in the eastern Slovak Ore Mountains at an altitude of 370 metres and covers an area of 39.57 km^{2}.

== Population ==
Population statistic (10 years)
Year	1995	2005	2015	2025
Count	958	971	1001	1005
Difference		+1.35%	+3.08%	+0.39%

Population statistic
Year	2024	2025
Count	1006	1005
Difference		−0.09%

It has a population of 1005 people (31 December 2025).

=== Ethnicity ===
Census 2021 (1+ %)
Ethnicity	Number	Fraction
Slovak	954	96.75%
Not found out	18	1.82%
Total	986	

In year 2021 was 986 people by ethnicity 954 as Slovak, 18 as Not found out, 9 as Hungarian, 6 as Other, 3 as Ukrainian, 3 as Rusyn, 2 as German, 1 as Czech, 1 as Russian and 1 as Austrian.

Note on population: The difference values of population numbers in the table "Population statistic" and in the sections "Ethnicity" & "Religion" is caused by the use of various statistical methods.

=== Religion ===
Census 2021 (1+ %)
Religion	Number	Fraction
Roman Catholic Church	829	84.08%
None	98	9.94%
Not found out	21	2.13%
Greek Catholic Church	14	1.42%
Total	986	

In year 2021 was 986 people by religion 829 from Roman Catholic Church, 98 from None, 21 from Not found out, 14 from Greek Catholic Church, 6 from Evangelical Church, 6 from Ad hoc movements, 3 from Eastern Orthodox Church, 2 from Other and not ascertained christian church, 2 from Christian Congregations in Slovakia, 1 from Calvinist Church, 1 from Paganism and natural spirituality, 1 from Other, 1 from Buddhism and 1 from Baptists Church.

== Genealogical resources ==
The records for genealogical research are available at the state archive "Statny Archiv in Levoca, Slovakia"

- Roman Catholic church records (births/marriages/deaths): 1750-1896 (parish A)
- Greek Catholic church records (births/marriages/deaths): 1727-1896 (parish B)
- Lutheran church records (births/marriages/deaths): 1783-1896 (parish B)

== See also ==
- List of municipalities and towns in Slovakia
