= Rožňava =

- Town
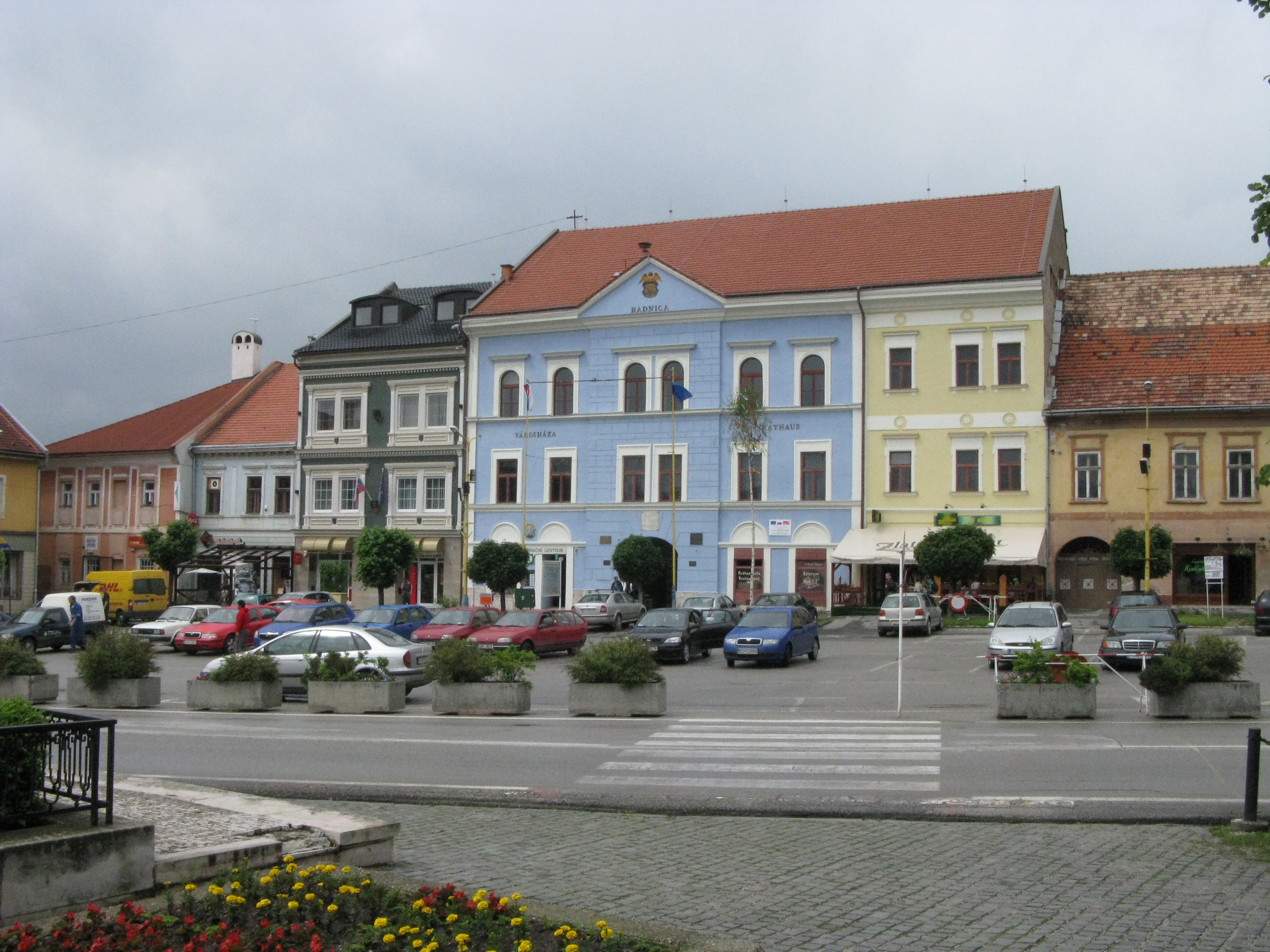
- Town center

- Flag Coat of arms
- Motto: Mesto s výhľadom
- Location of Rožňava in Slovakia Rožňava (Slovakia)
- Coordinates: 48°39′30″N 20°31′51″E
- Country: Slovakia
- Region: Košice Region
- District: Rožňava District
- First mentioned: 1291

Government
  - Mayor: Michal Domik

Area
  - Total: 47.22 km^{2} (18.23 sq mi)
- Elevation: 306 m (1,004 ft)

Population (2025)
  - Total: 16,794
- Time zone: UTC+1 (CET)
  - Summer (DST): UTC+2 (CEST)
- Postal code: 048 01
- Area code: +421 58
- Vehicle registration plate (until 2022): RV
- Website: www.roznava.sk

Rožňava (Hungarian: Rozsnyó, German: Rosenau, Latin: Rosnavia) is a town in Slovakia, approximately 71 kilometres (44 miles) by road from Košice in the Košice Region, and has a population of 19,182.

The town is an economic and tourist centre of the Gemer region. Rožňava is now a popular tourist attraction with a historic town centre. The town is an episcopal seat. It’s economy includes food, textile and remnants of mining industries.

== Geography ==
The municipality lies at an altitude of 306 metres (1,004 ft) and covers an area of 47.22 km^{2} (18.23 sq mi) (2025).

== History ==
Archaeological finds show that the region was densely settled by miners as early as around 1200. The first written mention stems from 1291, the royal free town status from 1410. The Roman Catholic diocese of Rozsnyó was founded in 1776.

In the Middle Ages, Rozsnyó was a prosperous mining town for gold, silver, and iron. Mining activities stagnated from the 16th century (when territories to the south of the town were conquered by Ottoman Turks). Mining - this time mainly of iron ore - was renewed around 1800 and was present in the town throughout the 20th century. It was ruled by Ottoman Empire as part of Filek sanjak (Its centre was Rimaszombat) during periods of 1554-1593 and 1596–1686. It was known as "Rojna" during Ottoman period.

The name of the town probably derives from the German word for rose (Rose, in the German name of the town "Rosenau"). Until 1920 it was part of Gömör és Kishont County of the Kingdom of Hungary, and again from 1938 to 1945.

During World War II, Rožňava was captured on 23 January 1945 by troops of the Romanian 4th Army, acting as a part of the Soviet 2nd Ukrainian Front.

On 13 September 2003, Rožňava was visited by Pope John Paul II.

== Noteworthy buildings ==
- an important Mining Museum
- a completely preserved medieval central town square with burgher houses
- the Cathedral (Gothic, late 13th century) with many precious historic art objects, especially a Renaissance painting of Mestercia showing realistic mining motifs, as well as the body of St. Neith, a catacombs Saint.
- the Town Tower (Renaissance, 1654) in the middle of the central town square
- the Jesuit church (Baroque, 1687)
- the Bishop's residence (Baroque-Classical, arose 1778 from older houses) with a plague column in front of the building
- a town hall (Classical, 1711)
- an Evangelic Lutheran church (Classical, 1786)
- a Reformed church (neo-Gothic, 1905)

== Population ==
Historical population
Year	Pop.	±%
1970	11,075	—
1980	14,901	+34.5%
1991	18,632	+25.0%
2001	19,261	+3.4%
2011	19,706	+2.3%
2021	17,569	−10.8%
Source: Censuses

Population statistic (10 years)
Year	1995	2005	2015	2025
Count	19,638	19,231	19,397	16,794
Difference		−2.07%	+0.86%	−13.41%

Population statistic
Year	2024	2025
Count	16,857	16,794
Difference		−0.37%

It has a population of 16,794 people (31 December 2025).

=== Ethnicity ===
Census 2021 (1+ %)
Ethnicity	Number	Fraction
Slovak	12,762	72.63%
Hungarian	3885	22.11%
Not found out	1619	9.21%
Romani	525	2.98%
Total	17,569	

In year 2021 was 17,569 people by ethnicity 12,762 as Slovak, 3885 as Hungarian, 1619 as Not found out, 525 as Romani, 91 as Czech, 56 as Rusyn, 49 as Other, 25 as Ukrainian, 24 as German, 11 as Chinese, 10 as Vietnamese, 10 as Russian, 9 as Italian, 8 as Polish, 6 as Jewish, 6 as Turkish, 5 as English, 4 as Greek, 3 as Serbian, 3 as Austrian, 3 as Moravian, 3 as Canadian, 2 as Irish, 2 as Romanian, 2 as Bulgarian, 1 as French, 1 as Croatian and 1 as Albanian.

Note on population: The difference values of population numbers in the table "Population statistic" and in the sections "Ethnicity" & "Religion" is caused by the use of various statistical methods.

=== Religion ===
Census 2021 (1+ %)
Religion	Number	Fraction
None	7494	42.65%
Roman Catholic Church	5041	28.69%
Not found out	1722	9.8%
Evangelical Church	1676	9.54%
Calvinist Church	904	5.15%
Greek Catholic Church	240	1.37%
Total	17,569	

In year 2021 was 17,569 people by religion 7494 from None, 5041 from Roman Catholic Church, 1722 from Not found out, 1676 from Evangelical Church, 904 from Calvinist Church, 240 from Greek Catholic Church, 121 from Jehovah's Witnesses, 72 from Apostolic Church, 49 from Ad hoc movements, 41 from Eastern Orthodox Church, 41 from Other, 27 from Other and not ascertained christian church, 27 from Christian Congregations in Slovakia, 27 from Buddhism, 20 from United Methodist Church, 16 from Islam, 13 from Seventh-day Adventist Church, 12 from Paganism and natural spirituality, 11 from Old Catholic Church, 9 from Jewish community, 3 from Hinduism, 2 from Baptists Church and 1 from New Apostolic Church.

== Notable citizens ==
- Haviva Reik (1914 – 1944), Jewish resistance fighter
- Vladimir Oravsky (born 1947), writer, director
- Martin Simon (born 1975), composer and guitarist
- Stanislav Stolárik (born 1955), Bishop of Rožňava (since 2015)
- Adam Szentpétery (born 1956), artist.
- Dana Velďáková (born 1981), triple jumper
- Jana Velďáková (born 1981), long jumper
- Henrieta Farkašová (born 1986), gold medal winner at the 2010 Winter Paralympics and at 2014 Sochi Paralympics
- Ladislav Orosz (born 1959), politician and jurist

== Parts of the town ==
- Nadabula
- Rožňavská Baňa (Rožňava Mine)

== Twin towns — sister cities ==
Rožňava is twinned with:

- Bačka Topola, Serbia
- Český Těšín, Czech Republic
- Cieszyn, Poland
- Lipótváros (Budapest), Hungary
- Szerencs, Hungary
- Baia Sprie, Romania
