= Roman Catholic Diocese of Makurdi =

Latin Catholic diocese in Nigeria

Diocese of Makurdi Dioecesis Makurdensis

Location
- Country: Nigeria
- Territory: Makurdi, Benue State
- Ecclesiastical province: Abuja
- Metropolitan: Abuja
- Coordinates: 7°43′50″N 8°32′10″E

Statistics
- Area: 7,304 km^{2} (2,820 sq mi)
- Population: Total; Catholics: (as of 2022); 1,514,950; 616,000 (40.7%)
- Parishes: 85

Information
- Denomination: Catholic Church
- Sui iuris church: Latin Church
- Rite: Roman Rite
- Established: April 2, 1959
- Cathedral: Our Lady of Perpetual Help Cathedral in Makurdi
- Secular priests: 169

Current leadership
- Pope: Leo XIV
- Bishop: Most Rev. Wilfred Chikpa Anagbe, CMF

Map
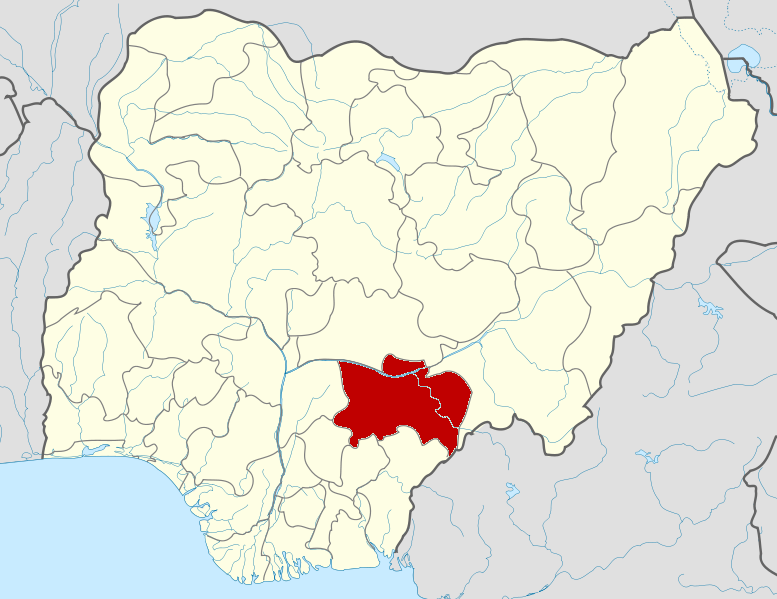
- Makurdi is located in Benue State which is shown in red.

Website
- https://cdmakurdi.org/

The Diocese of Makurdi (Latin: Makurden(sis)) is a Latin Catholic diocese located in the city of Makurdi, Benue State in the ecclesiastical province of Abuja in Nigeria.

== History ==
- July 9, 1934: Established as Apostolic Prefecture of Benue from the Apostolic Vicariate of Western Nigeria
- April 18, 1950: Renamed as the Apostolic Prefecture of Oturkpo
- April 2, 1959: Promoted as Diocese of Oturkpo
- June 28, 1960: Renamed as Diocese of Makurdi

== Special churches ==
The Cathedral is Our Lady of Perpetual Help Cathedral in Makurdi.

== Bishops ==
- Prefect Apostolic of Benue (Latin Church)
  - Fr. Giuseppe Kirsten, C.S.Sp. (26 Feb 1937 – 1947)
- Bishop of Oturkpo (Roman rite)
  - Bishop James Hagan, C.S.Sp. (20 Mar 1948 – 8 Mar 1960 see below)
- Bishops of Makurdi (Latin Church)
  - Bishop James Hagan, C.S.Sp. (see above 8 Mar 1960 – 29 Mar 1966)
  - Bishop Donal Joseph Murray, C.S.Sp. (11 Jan 1968 – 2 Jun 1989)
  - Bishop Athanasius Atule Usuh (2 Jun 1989 – 28 Mar 2015)
  - Bishop Wilfred Chikpa Anagbe, CMF (28 Mar 2015 -)

=== Coadjutor Bishop ===
- Wilfred Chikpa Anagbe, C.M.F. (2014-2015)
- Athanasius Atule Usuh (1987-1989)

=== Auxiliary Bishop ===
- William Amove Avenya (2008-2012), appointed Bishop of Gboko

=== Other priests of this diocese who became bishops ===
- Peter Iornzuul Adoboh, appointed Bishop of Katsina-Ala in 2012
- Michael Ekwoy Apochi (priest here, 1986-1995), appointed Bishop of Otupko in 2002
- Matthew Ishaya Audu, appointed Bishop of Lafia in 2000

== See also ==
- Catholic Church in Nigeria

== Sources ==
- GCatholic.org Information
- Catholic Hierarchy
