= Iyorwuese Hagher =

Nigerian politician

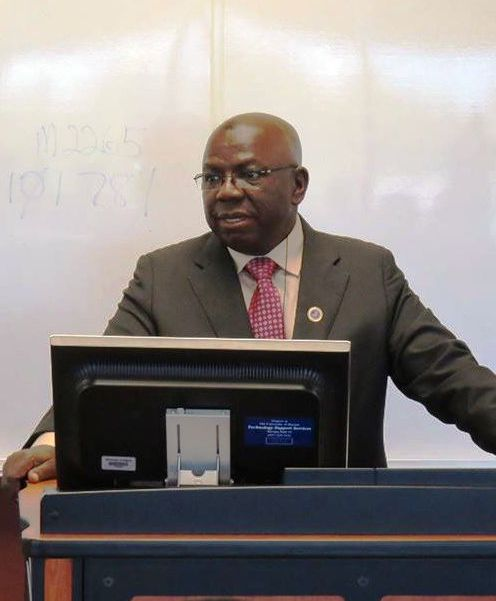
- Hagher speaking at the University of Dayton in 2015

Senator, Benue North-East Senatorial District, Senate of Nigeria
- In office 1983–1983

Minister of State for Power and Steel
- In office 1994–1997

Minister of State for Health
- In office 1997–1998

Nigeria's Ambassador to Mexico
- In office 2003–2008

Nigeria's High Commissioner to Canada
- In office 2008–2012
- Preceded by: O. O. George
- Succeeded by: Ojo Maduekwe

Personal details
- Born: June 25, 1949 Kasar, Katsina-Ala, Benue State, Nigeria

Iyorwuese Harry Hagher, OON (born 25 June 1949) is a Nigerian professor of theatre for development, novelist, playwright, poet, politician, administrator and activist for social justice. He was a senator, cabinet minister, envoy and pro-chancellor of Afe Babalola University. He is renowned for his groundbreaking research on Kwagh-Hir theatre, which was inscribed on the UNESCO Intangible Cultural Heritage Lists in 2019. Hagher is passionate about the issue of leadership. His plays are preoccupied with the search for true leadership and other solutions to Africa's socio-political problems. He is known to have engaged cultural diplomacy as a tool for foreign relations while serving as Nigeria's Ambassador to Mexico, and later High Commissioner to Canada. In 2019, he was a presidential aspirant, under the platform of the Social Democratic Party (SDP). He is currently the president, African Leadership Institute, Dayton, Ohio, United States.

== Background ==
Iyorwuese Hagher was born to the family of Tica Daniel Hagher Gbaaiko. His father and mother were both Christians. He was the only boy of the union which also had six girls. His father was a headmaster and missionary with the Dutch Reformed Missionaries of South Africa and worked as a field worker planting new stations and outreaches. Iyorwuese grew up sharing his parents with other children as his father adopted a lot of primary school children so they could get an education. As he would recount, he too belonged to the whole village and everybody brought him up.

His early life was in the village of Tse-Gbagir in Torov, present-day Ukum local government area of Benue State. It was a typical communal Tiv village. Growing up, he lived the village life: fishing, hunting, mingling, and eating anything in neighbouring homes, orchards, farms, and fields. The communality of the village imbued him with love and engendered in him the freedom to think, dream, and be adventurous.

As a primary school pupil, Iyorwuese witnessed a case of police brutality and abuse of power, when his father was arrested by the Tiv Native Authority Police during a class. His father's crime was being an active member of the United Middle Belt Congress (UMBC). During Nigeria's first republic, the UMBC had been formed to struggle for the creation of the Middle Belt State from the large Northern Region and serve as an alternative minority voice in the Northern Nigeria Assembly which was dominated by the Northern People's Congress (NPC). On the occasion of his father's arrest, pupils were also arrested for tax evasion. As his father questioned police authority to carry out the arrests, he was brutalized with truncheons and while bleeding on his head, he was dragged out of the class. His father would later be charged with obstructing the police on lawful duty. He was jailed for six months before his acquittal by the Magistrate Court in Makurdi. Later, he was arrested again for being part of the UMBC revolts and jailed for over a year before his acquittal.

Iyorwuese Hagher is married to a lawyer and educationist, Nancy Ngiahiin Hagher. They have biological and non-biological children. He hails from Kasar, Katsina-Ala local government area of Benue State.

=== Education ===
Iyorwuese Hagher had his foundational education in the early 50s and early 60s in Zaki Biam.

He attended a missionary secondary school, run by the Christian Reformed Church in Canada and America, William Mackel Bristow Secondary School in Gboko, Benue State and Kuru Government Secondary School for his Higher School Certificate. In 1971, he was admitted into the Ahmadu Bello University Zaria, where he received a Bachelor of Arts degree in English Language in 1974. He later obtained his Master of Arts and doctorate in Drama at the same university in 1977 and 1981, respectively.

== Career ==
Iyorwuese Hagher's career cuts across academia, politics, administration, diplomacy, and advocacy.

=== Academia ===
After his compulsory National Youth Service Corps program in Bendel State (now Edo and Delta states), Hagher was appointed a pioneer staff of the Centre for Nigerian Cultural Studies and Drama Department at the Ahmadu Bello University as a graduate assistant at the age of 26. He taught and conducted research in African indigenous theatres. In 1990, he rose to the rank of a full university professor of Theatre and Drama for Development at the University of Jos, Plateau State. Hagher has published significant work on Tiv puppetry known as Kwagh-Hir, which is one of the forms he is known to have used in his development efforts. His theatre works are known to address issues of corruption, governance, health, and social vices.

In 2000, he founded the Leadership Institute after retiring from the university. He became a public intellectual and opened up his inquisitive mind to be educated in different disciplines like peace and gender studies, conflict and mediation, and medicine and nutrition.

=== Administration ===
Hagher was appointed the founding Director of the Benue State Arts Council in 1982. As head of the council, he worked with Tiv peasants in Central Nigeria using Kwagh-hir puppetry theatre as a social change agent. He also established the legendary award-winning Benue State Arts Council dance troupe.

In 1994, he was appointed into the Federal Executive Council of Nigeria as the Minister of State, Federal Ministry of Power and Steel under the Sani Abacha administration. In 1997, he was transferred to the Federal Ministry of Health as the Minister of State – a position he held until the end of the administration in 1998, when Abacha passed on.

As Minister of State for Health, he is known to have used drama to address the HIV/AIDS epidemic. Particularly, in Benue, he worked with Kwagh-hir artists to produce ‘Anakande’ which effectively addressed the global epidemic when Benue State had the highest prevalence rate in Nigeria.

While at the Ahmadu Bello University, Hagher was a Head of Department and an elected member of the University Senate on different occasions. He was also the University Senate's representative to the Centre for Continuing Education Academic Board.

Hagher also served on the committee on Commercialization of the Nigeria Television Authority, Federal Radio Corporation of Nigeria, and the National Copyright Council.

He was also elected as a member of the Constitutional Conference of 1994–1995.

=== Envoy ===
Iyorwuese Hagher was appointed by President Olusegun Obasanjo as Nigeria's Ambassador to Mexico with concurrent accreditation to Panama, Costa Rica and Guatemala (2003-2008). In 2008, President Umaru Musa Yar'Adua again appointed him as Nigeria's High Commissioner to Canada: a position he held until 2012. He engaged in cultural diplomacy, using theatre, drama and poetry to enhance bilateral relations between Nigeria and the host countries. This also availed him the opportunity to lecture in some universities in those countries.

He is renowned for his cultural and citizenship diplomacy and won a commendation from the Ministry of Foreign Affairs for his non-fiction book, Nigeria: After the Nightmare.

=== Politics ===
Iyorwuese Hagher began his political life in 1977 when he was appointed the Benue State Arts Council Chairman. This enabled him to resuscitate the top ranks of the defunct United Middle Belt Congress (UMBC) into the movement led by Joseph Tarka, his political mentor. The national movement started by J. S. Tarka evolved into the National Party of Nigeria (NPN) which formed the government of Alhaji Shehu Shagari in 1979 and 1983.

Hagher continued to be a grassroots mobilizer, using the arts of dance and drama for public social mobilization and action.

In 1983, he ran for election and won a landslide victory as a federal senator representing the Benue North-East constituency at the age of 34. He served in the senate as the Deputy Chief Whip. His tenure would however be truncated by a coup led by Major General Muhammadu Buhari, which ended the second republic on 31 December 1983.

In 1994, he was elected to the National Constitutional Conference.

In 2019, he was a presidential aspirant under the platform of the Social Democratic Party. During his campaigns, Hagher urged the EFCC to prosecute presidents with fraudulent manifestoes, citing for example that the incumbent, Muhammadu Buhari, had promised to provide at least 20% of annual budgets for education. Still, less than 7% of the budget was being allocated to the sector. He also cited Buhari's campaign promise of setting up special courts, accelerating trials, and jailing terrorists, kidnappers, and other criminals. He lamented that Nigeria had become the most insecure place to be, torn apart along religious and ethnic lines, and was gradually becoming a failed state.

He hinged his campaign on a deliberate revolution of hope based on education, restructuring, modern infrastructure and human development at a pace befitting of a modern state.

=== Advocacy and associations ===
Iyorwuese Hagher was the Founding Chairman of the Association of Pro-chancellors of Private Universities of Nigeria (APPUN); Founder/Honorary President of Leadership Institute Nigeria and Director of the Association of Nigerians against Corruption (ANAC). He is at present Chairman of the Board of Trustees of Pro-Chancellors of Private Universities of Nigeria and President, of the African Leadership Institute, USA. He is also a mentor at the Graduate School of Leadership and Change at Antioch University.

He is a member of the International Council of Management Consulting Institutes, a Fellow of the Society of Nigerian Theatre Artists and Institute of Management Consultants.

Hagher is a recipient of one of Nigeria's highest honours, Officer of the Order of the Niger, for his role in peacebuilding in Nigeria, especially in negotiating for peace among the warring ethnic groups of Central Nigeria in 2003.

In 2020, he was awarded the Nigerians in Diaspora Integrity Ambassador at the Gani Fawehinmi Impact and Integrity Awards for his selfless service to humanity.

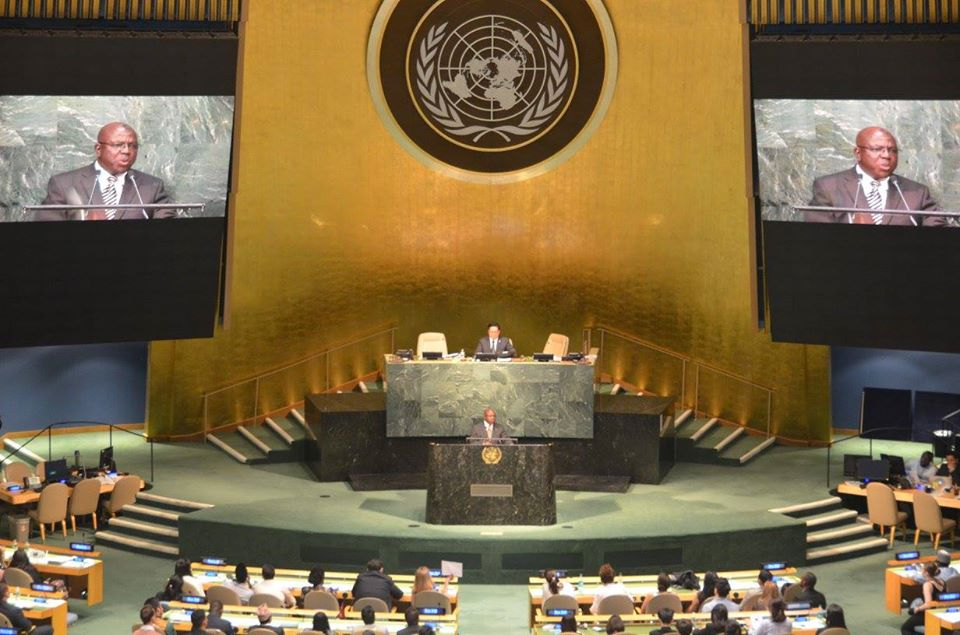
Hagher addresses International Youth Leaders at the UN, in New York, Aug. 2016

== Bibliography ==
Hagher's published works span drama, poetry, fiction, literary criticism, leadership, political commentary, cultural studies, and community theatre. His writings frequently explore themes of governance, social justice, conflict resolution, Tiv history and culture, African leadership, and the role of theatre in social transformation. In addition to plays and scholarly works, he has published essays, lectures, and poetry, contributing to both creative literature and academic discourse. His published works includes the following works:

- A Portrait of Paradise at Google Books
- Leadership: Leading Africa Out of Chaos at Google Books
- English Language and its Discontents, Caltop Publications, Ibadan, 2024
- Beyond Ethnic Grievance: The Jukun and Tiv Crises, Tudor House Publishers, Aberdeen, 2024
- The Conquest of Azenga at Google Books
- Nigeria: After the Nightmare at Google Books
- A Day in Mexico City: And Other Poems at Google Books
- Leading Africa Out of Chaos: A God-centred Approach to Leadership at Google Books
- Beyond Hate and Violence: Understanding the Tiv Struggle for Citizenship Rights and Social Justice in Nigeria at Google Books
- Weapons of Mass Instruction: Selected Speeches and Essays on Politics, Art and Leadership at Google Books
- Once upon an eagle
- The Travails of James Skott: A Play at Google Books
- The Tiv Kwagh-Hir: A Popular Nigerian Puppet Theatre at Google Books
- The Kwagh-hir Theatre: (a Metaphor of Resistance) at Google Books
- The Prisoner's Dream at Google Books
- Global Home and Other Plays
- The Masquerade and the Elephant
- The Professor and the Cathedral: A Play at Google Books
- Aishatu, and Other Plays at Google Books
- Comrade and Voltage, with Other Plays at Google Books
- Lifetimes: A Play at Google Books
- Theatre, Politics, and Social Consciousness in Nigeria: Celebration of the Dramaturgy of Iyorwuese Hagher at Google Books
- Theatre and Stage-craft in Nigeria at Google Books
- Modern Kwagh-hir Stories for the Young, Published by Y books, 1987.
- We Protest, Alexander Street Press, VA, 2002.
- The camps of Segbwema, Alexander Street Press, Alexandria, 2002.
- Anti-people, Alexander Street Press, Alexandria, 2002.
- Lamp of peace, Caltop Publications, Ibadan, 1997
- The Practice of community theatre in Nigeria, Society of Nigerian Theatre Artists, Owerri, 1990.
- The intellectual, the university and the future of Nigeria: a Benue State University public lecture, Caltop Publications Abuja, 2012.
- Mulkin mata, Alexander Street Press, Alexandria, 2002.
- Stories from A.B.U., by Iyorwuese H Hagher; Gambo Dori; O C Ande-Muottoh; Brian F Downes, Dept. of English, A.B.U., Zaria, 1976.
- Swem Karagbe at Google Books
- Community theatre is development agency, NCAC news. 1 (4), March 1992, page 9.
- The role of dance in Tiv culture, Nigeria magazine. 55 (1), January–March 1987, pages 25–38.
