= 2015 Benue State gubernatorial election =

State election in Nigeria

- April 11, 2015
Nominee	Samuel Ortom	Terhemen Tarzoor
Party	APC	PDP
Popular vote	422,932	313,878
Governor before election
Gabriel Suswam
PDP
Elected Governor
Samuel Ortom
APC

The 2015 Benue State gubernatorial election was the eighth gubernatorial election of Benue State, Nigeria, held on April 11, 2015. The All Progressives Congress nominee Samuel Ortom won the election, defeating Terhemen Tarzoor of the People's Democratic Party.

== APC primary ==
APC primaries was supposed to be held on December 4, 2014, but it was shifted to December 5, 2014. On December 5, 2014, Steve Ugbah went to court and secured an injunction to stop the primaries because his name was excluded from the primaries. The injunction was later vacated on December 9, 2014. Days later, Samuel Ortom became APC candidate after other governorship aspirants stepped down for him and his name was submitted as the consensus candidate on December 11, 2014. This happened at the end of a close door meeting in Makurdi, Benue State brokered by former governor of the state (1999 to 2007), George Akume. APC governorship aspirants that stepped down are Emmanuel Jime, Mike Iordye and Akange Audu. Later, Steve Ugbah, Mike Iordye, JKN Waku and Akange Audu wrote to the APC national secretariat urging it to reject any name forwarded to it, because they didn't agree on a consensus candidate or conduct any primaries in Benue State. The case was later tabled to Abuja Federal High Court in suit number FHC/ABJ/ CS/1057/14, against the party leadership by Steve Ugbah, Emmanuel Jime, Mike Iordye and JKN Waku. During the court case, Mike Iordye told the court that he didn't authorise the filing of the suit and his name was struck out as a party. However, Steve Ugbah also notified the court about his withdrawal from the suit after he became the Director General of the Ortom/Abounu Governorship Campaign Organization, leaving only Emmanuel Jime and JKN Waku in the suit. In August 2015, Emmanuel Jime and JKN Waku finally withdrew their case in the court after the intervention of President of Nigeria, Muhammadu Buhari.

=== Candidates ===
- Samuel Ortom
- Emmanuel Jime
- Mike Iordye
- Akange Audu
- Steve Ugbah
- JKN Waku

== PDP primary ==
PDP candidate Terhemen Tarzoor defeated 7 other contestants to clinch the party ticket. He won with 517 votes to defeat his closest rival and the deputy governor of the state, Steven Lawani, who received 311 votes. Samuel Ortom, former Minister of Industry, Trade and Investment received 111 votes, Sam Odeh received 48 votes, Ada Chenge received 47 votes, Mike Kaase Aondoakaa received 25 votes, Mathias Oyigeya received 5 votes, Terhemba Shija received 3 votes. During the election, ten aspirants withdrew from the exercise for personal reasons. Their names are Felix Atume, Andy Owouku, Alex Adum, James Mbachiantim, Tivlumun Nyitse, David Ker, Hinga Biem, Simon Anchaver, Eugine Aliegba and Terhemba Nongo.

=== Candidates ===
- Terhemen Tarzoor
- Steven Lawani
- Samuel Ortom
- Sam Odeh
- Ada Chenge
- Mike Kaase Aondoakaa
- Mathias Oyigeya
- Terhemba Shija

== Other governorship aspirants and party ==
- Caleb Ugiringa Aba, APGA
- William Ligom, LP
- Samuel Gar, SDP
- Boniface Umele, ACPN
- Ogolekwu Shadrack, APA
- Odeh Helen, NNPP

== Results ==
A total of 8 candidates contested in the election.

2015 Benue State gubernatorial election
Party	Candidate	Votes	%	±%
APC	Samuel Ortom	422,932		
PDP	Terhemen Tarzoor	313,878		
APC hold				

== Aftermath ==
After the election, Terhemen Tarzoor from the People's Democratic Party challenged the outcome of the election at the Benue State Governorship Elections Petitions Tribunal. The PDP candidate told the tribunal that the APC candidate and the winner of the election, Samuel Ortom was not qualified because he was not validly nominated to contest the election by his party, the APC. He also told the tribunal to declare that all votes scored by Samuel Ortom were invalid and that he should be declared the winner after certificate of return is withdrawn from Samuel Ortom. The tribunal upheld the election of Samuel Ortom. The case was also taken to the Appeal court and Supreme court, which also upheld the victory of Samuel Ortom in the election.
