= Alfred Akawe Torkula =

His Royal Majesty, Begha U Tiv, Orchivirigh, Alfred Akawe Torkula
- Tor Tiv IV
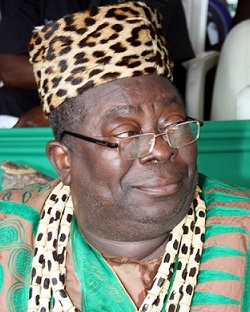
- Reign: 21 April 1991 – 22 November 2015
- Predecessor: James Akperan Orshi
- Successor: James Ayatse
- Born: 10 July 1944; Tse-Torkula, Mbadwem District, Guma Local Government Area of Benue State
- Died: 22 November 2015 (aged 71); Abuja
- Burial: Abagu, Gboko, Benue State

Alfred Akawe Torkula, CFR (10 July 1944 - 22 November 2015) was the fourth Tor Tiv, the supreme ruler of the Tiv people and Chairman of the Benue State Council of Traditional Rulers. He ascended the throne on the principle of rotation (ya na angbian) among the two sons of Tiv, Ichongu and Ipusu. He was an Ihyarev man and son of Ichongo, and became the 2nd Tor Tiv to have come from the Ichongo extraction. He ruled from 14 January 1991 to 22 November 2015.

He was the chancellor of the Michael Okpara University of Agriculture, Umudike in Abia State.

== Early life and education ==
Orchivirigh Dr. Alfred Akawe Torkula was born in Tse-Torkula, Mbadwem District, Guma Local Government Area of Benue State, Nigeria. He commenced his education at the Tiv N. A. Elementary School, Gboko, from 1953 to 1958, followed by St. Theresa's Catholic Primary School, Naka, in 1959. He pursued his secondary education at Mt. Saint Michael's Secondary School, Aliade, from 1960 to 1964. Subsequently, he attended Kings College, Lagos, before proceeding to Ahmadu Bello University, Zaria. He furthered his studies at the University of Besançon, France, where he obtained a B.A. (Hons), DEFE, specializing in French Language, graduating in 1971.

== Career and positions ==
Torkula began his career in civil service in the Benue Plateau State Civil Service and continued in Benue State following its creation in 1976. He spent over two decades in the civil service and held various significant positions, including serving as a Permanent Secretary and Director-General. His exemplary service led to his appointment as a Commissioner for Local Government Affairs in April 1989 under the administration of Colonel Fidelis Makka, making him a member of the Benue State Executive Council.

In 1991, he underwent the customary processes and ascended to become The Tor Tiv IV, assuming the mantle of leadership and also assuming the role of Chairman of the Benue State Council of Traditional Rulers, a position he held till death.

=== Academics and honours ===
Torkula earned a Ph.D. in Cultural Anthropology. He was honoured with honorary LL.D and D.Sc. degrees from the University of Ibadan and Michael Okpara University Of Agriculture, Umudike, respectively.

He served as Chancellors of the University of Ibadan, Ibadan, (March 1994 - November 2001), and later the University of Calabar. At the time of his death, he was Chancellor, Michael Okpara University of Agriculture, Umudike.

Alfred Akawe Torkula is a recipient of the prestigious Nigerian national honor, Commander of the Federal Republic (CFR).

== Reign as Tor Tiv ==
At the time of his coronation, Orchivirigh Alfred Akawe Torkula inherited a Tiv society embroiled in internal and external conflicts. The Jukun-Tiv crisis in Taraba was claiming a lot of lives and then internal boundary crises within Benue were inflicting harm upon fellow Tiv people. He emphasized the need for peace and unity among the Tiv people, and threatened to depose any district or clan head found to be instigating any crisis. His prompt actions and directives within the Tiv Traditional Council curbed inter-communal conflicts, creating an atmosphere conducive to lasting peace.

He introduced chieftaincy titles as a means of recognizing and uniting deserving individuals within the Tiv society, emphasizing the collective goal of fostering development while transcending personal political alliances. Later, he conferred chieftaincy titles on prominent non-Tiv personalities like late Alhaji Aliyu Mohammed, a former Secretary to the Government of the Federation, who was honoured as the first Zege Mule U Tiv (the great shade of the Tiv), the highest traditional title in the land, an honour that was later conferred on ex-vice president Atiku Abubakar. He also conferred the title of Asor-Tar-U-Tiv (one who heals the land of Tiv) on former British colonial officer, Martin Dent.

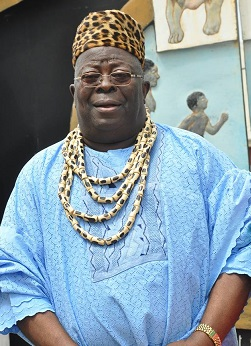
Tor Tiv at his palace gate at Gboko

Recognizing emerging threats to traditional practices, he ardently championed the preservation of Tiv cultural heritage by publishing books among were 'Death and Burial Customs of the Tiv People of Central Nigeria,' 'The Cosmology in Tiv Worldview,' ‘The Tiv Woman: Challenges and Prospects,' 'Presidential Democracy in Nigeria: Grassroots Experience' and 'The Culture of Partisan Politics in Nigeria: A Historical Perspective.' He staunchly opposed and reversed societal shifts that deviated from established Tiv cultural norms. He sought to uphold respect for elders, discourage materialism-driven mindsets, and abolished practices contradicting Tiv customs, such as exorbitant bride prices, burials, and exploitative fundraising traditions.

Dr. Torkula also initiated structural reforms within the Tiv Traditional Council, expanding district leadership and implementing measures to fortify the council's efficiency and impact on community welfare by creating 14 second class stools. Later, he proposed an addition six additional first class stools and 60 third class chiefdoms in the Tiv Area Traditional Council.

He emphasized the distinctiveness of Tiv cultural heritage, showcasing Tiv attire and traditions, aiming to safeguard and project the essence of Tiv identity. He opted for a departure from the customary turban typically worn by northern royal figures. Instead, he embraced the traditional attire associated with Bantu lineage, donning a leopard skin cap and adorned with beads - a distinctive choice aligned with the heritage of the Tiv people, symbolizing their ancestral roots.

His reign faced hindrances due to political interference, urging the need for legislative changes to afford the traditional institution autonomy and protect it from undue political influence.

Chairman of Northern Traditional Council of Chiefs, the Sultan of Sokoto, Dr. Abubakar Sa’ad II described him as "an educationist who ensure that his people move from the level of illiteracy to literacy; a businessman who create avenues for incomes for many of his subjects."

== See also ==
- Tor Tiv
- Tiv people
- Gondo Aluor
- Akperan Orshi
- Makir Zakpe
- James Ayatse
