= Kwagh-Hir =

Nigerian Tiv people cultural art

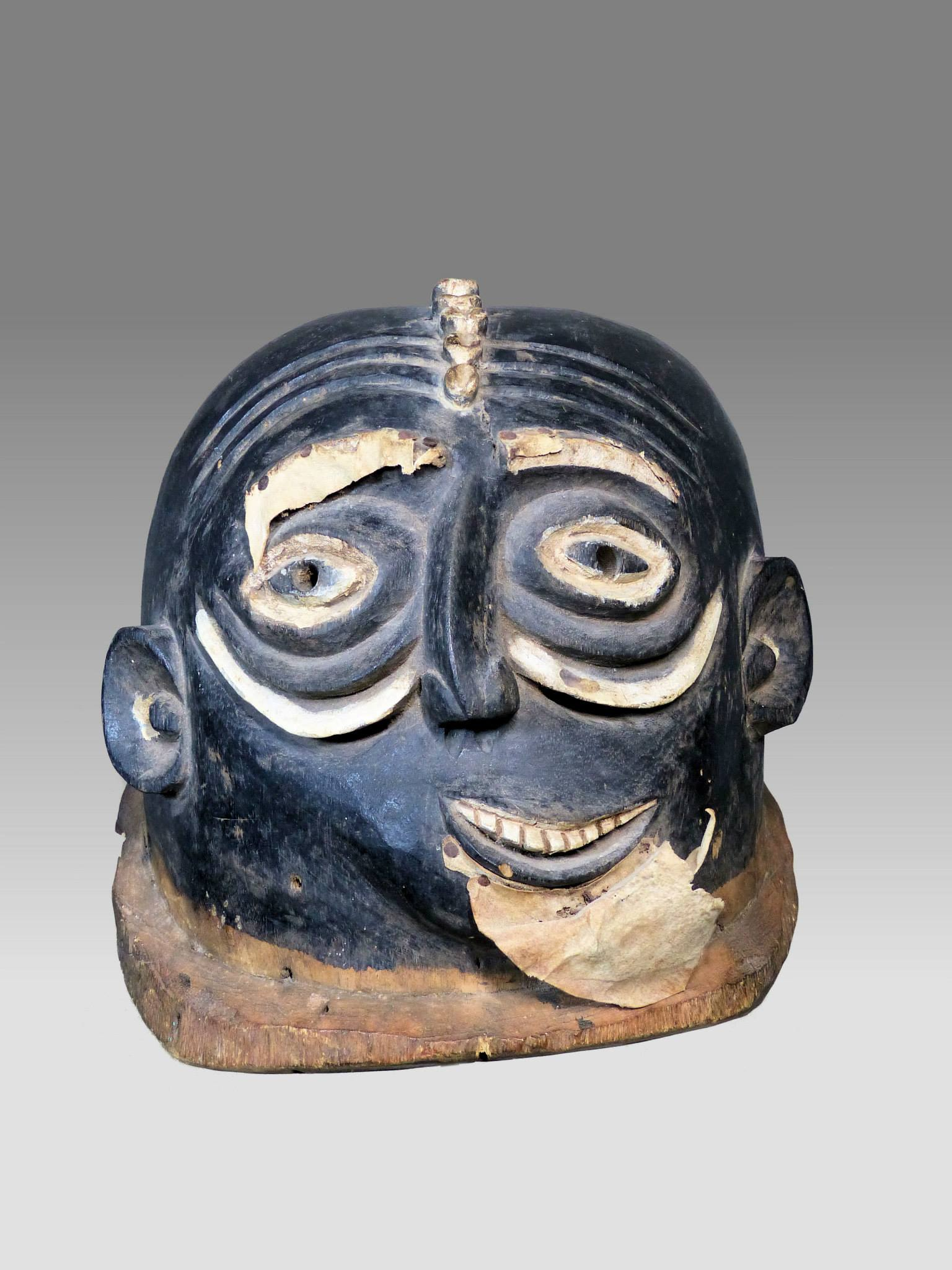
- A 1960s kwagh-hir mask
- Medium: Puppetry, masquerading, poetry, music, dance and animated narratives
- Originating culture: Tiv

Kwagh-Hir theatrical performance
- UNESCO Intangible Cultural Heritage
- Country: Nigeria
- Reference: 00683
- Region: Africa

Inscription history
- Inscription: 2020 (14th session)
- List: Representative

Kwagh-hir (literally means something magical or a thing of magic and pronounced kwaa-hee) is a multipart culturally edifying art form of the Tiv people of central Nigeria which became popular in the 1960s. It is a dramatic public performance telling moral stories of past and current events, and incorporates puppetry, masquerading, poetry, music, dance and animated narratives to portray its moral themes. It is used by the Tiv people to reinforce traditional beliefs and convey other worldly tales to educate, socialize, provide secular entertainment and address societal issues.

Kwagh-hir is a higher art form of kwagh-alom, an aged practice of the Tiv people where the family was treated to a storytelling session by creative storytellers, usually in the early hours of the night after the day's farming work by moonlight.

The most familiar variant of the kwagh-hir according to Jonathan Fogel may be the Punch and Judy show, in which recognizable characters lampoons current political figures and events in the news while also referencing an array of cultural mores.

Kwagh-hir was inscribed on the Representative List of the Intangible Cultural Heritage of Humanity in 2019 by the decision of the Intergovernmental Committee: 14.COM 10.B.27.

== Origin and development ==
Legend has it that, Adikpo Songo from Akpagher; Mbatyav in the present day Gboko local government area of Benue State, Nigeria, was the originator of Kwagh-hir. Adikpo Songu, in an interview with Iyorwuese Hagher, a scholar of Kwagh-hir, attempted to corroborate this view held by several kwagh-hir group leaders and notable elders in Tivland.

Songu, an ardent supporter of the United Middle Belt Congress (UMBC) revealed that, in December 1960 during the outbreak of the political crisis in Tivland known as Nande-Nande (the burning cycle), whereby members of the UMBC rose against the ruling Northern People's Congress (NPC), burning their properties, including that of government workers and chiefs, he had escaped to Mkar Christian Hospital, near Gboko, for medical treatment, but deductively, to escape arrest from the police.

On his way back from Mkar Christian Hospital, having traveled for about 12 miles, he arrived near the Orkoor River when suddenly he heard the sound of fascinating music. As he drew closer, hiding behind bamboo reeds and watching, he saw a crowd of two groups. Their positions coincided with the direction of two clans, Mbayion and Mbatyav. A white flag was hoisted in-between the two groups which both had a band of drummers, dancing girls and puppets on a dagbera (platform). He then realized that the performers were not really human beings but adzov (spirits).

The two groups seemed to be engaged in a competition which looked to him like the story-telling tradition of the Tiv known as kwagh-alom, but with a difference. In this instance, instead of a storyteller, a man would come to the centre of the arena and at the top of his voice announce to the audience what they were about to see. Then the performers would file into the area either as animals dancing or adzov, engaged in dancing to emphasize their character.

Adikpo Songu says he fell asleep watching the spectacle, and upon waking up the following morning, there was nothing in the vicinity to show that an event of such had taken place in the location. So he came to the conclusion that the adzov must have deliberately selected him for the purpose of entrusting him with the responsibility of bringing kwagh-hir to the Tiv people, and humanity in the form and style he had been privileged to watch. ^{A}

According to Iyorwuese Hagher, the Tiv are not want to the personalization of artworks. The Tiv would attribute any level of excellence to witchcraft; tsav or adzov, who could protect the gifted from harm of other Tsav. Thus, his inquisition into the originator of the kwagh-hir may have been lost on the Tiv people. Hence they offered the leading kwagh-hir artist (Tor-Kwagh-hir) as the originator. Hagher concluded that no one person started the kwagh-hir in its present form.

However, Gowon Ama Doki avers that contemporary kwagh-hir puppet theatre owes its birth to Adikpo Songu from Mbatyav clan in Gboko area of Benue State when he held an audience spellbound with his puppets and masquerades in 1960.

Nevertheless, the nexus of kwagh-hir scholars, including Doki, is that like any other theatrical performance, kwagh-hir cannot be linked to a single individual as an originator. Rather, it is a creation of the mass populace of a people, coming together to share experiences. It was in the 1960s that the extraordinary creative statement of kwagh-hir was made; combining visual, musical, creative and kinetic arts to expand the words of a story-teller into the form of whole theatre.

=== The Nyambuan theatre ===
Before kwagh-hir, the Tiv had seen another theatrical performance known as Nyambuan which was prominent between 1934 and 1939. Nyambuan literally means the meat is gone bad. It was a slogan and movement targeted at demystifying the Mbatsav (evil people). The Nyambuan performance came with intense social, political implications and sought to re-establish order through cathartic performances aimed at abolishing the Tiv exchange marriages known as yamen-ishe (roughly translated as trading value) and restoring the cultural disruptions imposed on the Tiv people by the colonial structures. The performance took the form of a celebration, with music players and dancers forming the major aspect of the performance which was based on rituals. There were massive arrests and unlawful detentions of the Nyambuan performers.

The Kwagh-hir, which later emerged and is practised today, de-emphasises dialogue because of the brutality with which the Nyambuan cult dramatists were suppressed by the combined efforts of the missionaries and the British colonial government.

== Structural organization ==
A kwagh-hir group or event is multifaceted in its structural organization. It involves the collective efforts of members who all have distinct roles to play. A typical kwagh-hir group, according to Iyorwuese Hagher, is segmented into four: the management; the performers; the musicians and the sculptors (carvers).^{B}

=== Management ===
Several roles have been identified in a typical kwagh-hir group involving men, women and youth.

- Ter kwagh-hir (patron) - Gives identity to group and ensures intra group harmony.
- Orkyon (chairman of kwagh-hir group management committee) - Usually an affluent member of the community who provides resources for the welfare of the group
- Ordondon (chairman of kwagh-hir group management committee) - Assists orkyon in the welfare of the group.
- Orngeren (secretary) - Summons meetings and presents agenda. Also issues communiqués from the management to the membership
- Ikpanyar (treasurer) - Responsible for all monies accruing to the group and disburses same accordingly.
- Tor Kwagh-hir (artistic director) - Chairperson of the management team. He coordinates the entire ensemble and is also in charge of their welfare.
- Torkwase (women's leader) - Looks after female artists’ welfare and needs during performances. Also in charge of choreography of all women dances and teaches them songs as well.
- Dugeri (warder) - Ensures discipline and settles minor disputes between members.
- Tor Ikyo (forest guard) - Leads and guides wood carvers in the forest.
- Agum-a-ior (youths) - Ensures the safety of visitors, guard the elements and inspire performers during productions.

=== Performers ===
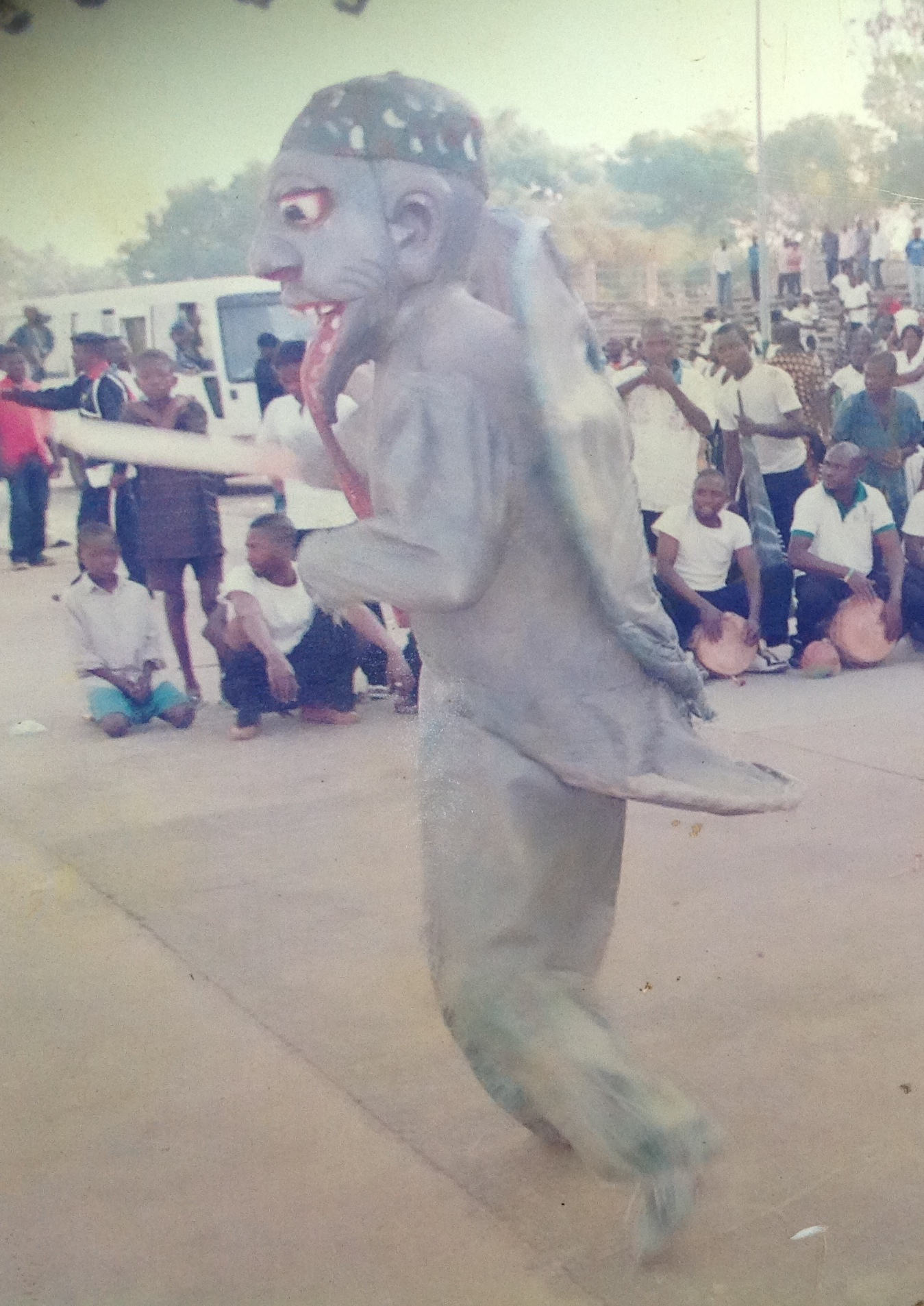
A kwagh-hir character performs during the Benue Youth Carnival

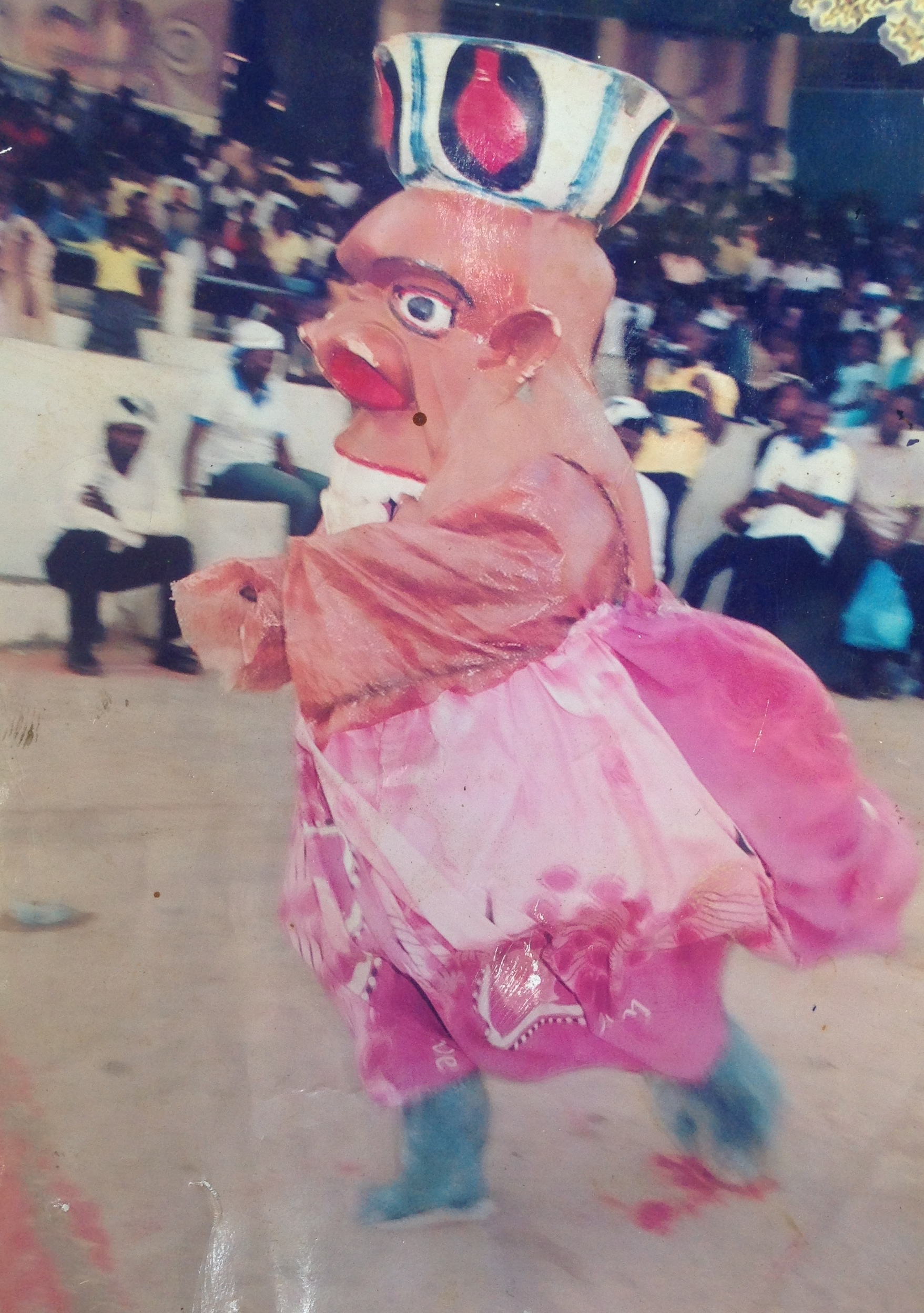
A kwagh-hir performance during the Benue Youth Carnival in Makurdi.

There are several performers in a kwagh-hir group and their roles are determined by the story they intend to portray. However, the list below shows the performers found in virtually every kwagh-hir group that exists.

- Or shurwa (narrator) - Most articulate member who is responsible for rapport between the audience and the performers. He cues in the performers and fills-in breaks with witty performances.
- Mbakuuv (masqueraders) - Those behind the masks and theatrical garments.
- Or Iwanger (lighting man) - In charge of lights. He carries the torch as a guide for mbakuuv in the performance arena.
- Mbanyoron dagbera (puppeteers) - Controllers of marionettes from beneath the platform.
- Ortongon korough (horn blower or timekeeper) - Times the duration of the various performances

=== Musicians ===
The musicians are led by the tor gbande (chief drummer) who is assisted by the mue-tor gbande. Several other drummers form part of the band and play different types of drums known as itsorough (Tiv native snare drum), ngo gbande (Tiv native bass drum), etc.

=== Sculptor ===
Sculptor (or gban akaa) is rarely seen during the kwagh-hir performance. However, he is the mainstay of a kwagh-hir group. In practice, he is regarded as the scriptwriter and director because he determines the rendition and aesthetics of performances. The sculptor, based on his inventiveness is hired to produce puppets and mask for a group.

== Theatre arena ==
Kwagh-hir stage is divided into the main area, chorus position, backstage and auditorium.

The main area is a semi-circular formation in the performing area. This is where artists perform their best skill after moving round the fringes. The chorus position is at a corner of the stage. It joins the audience with the backstage and is occupied by singers and dancers.

The backstage is usually the backyard of round huts. This area is strictly restricted to the kwagh-hir group members. The auditorium is the area surrounding the main arena around where the audience sits.

== Kwagh-hir aesthetics and cosmetics ==
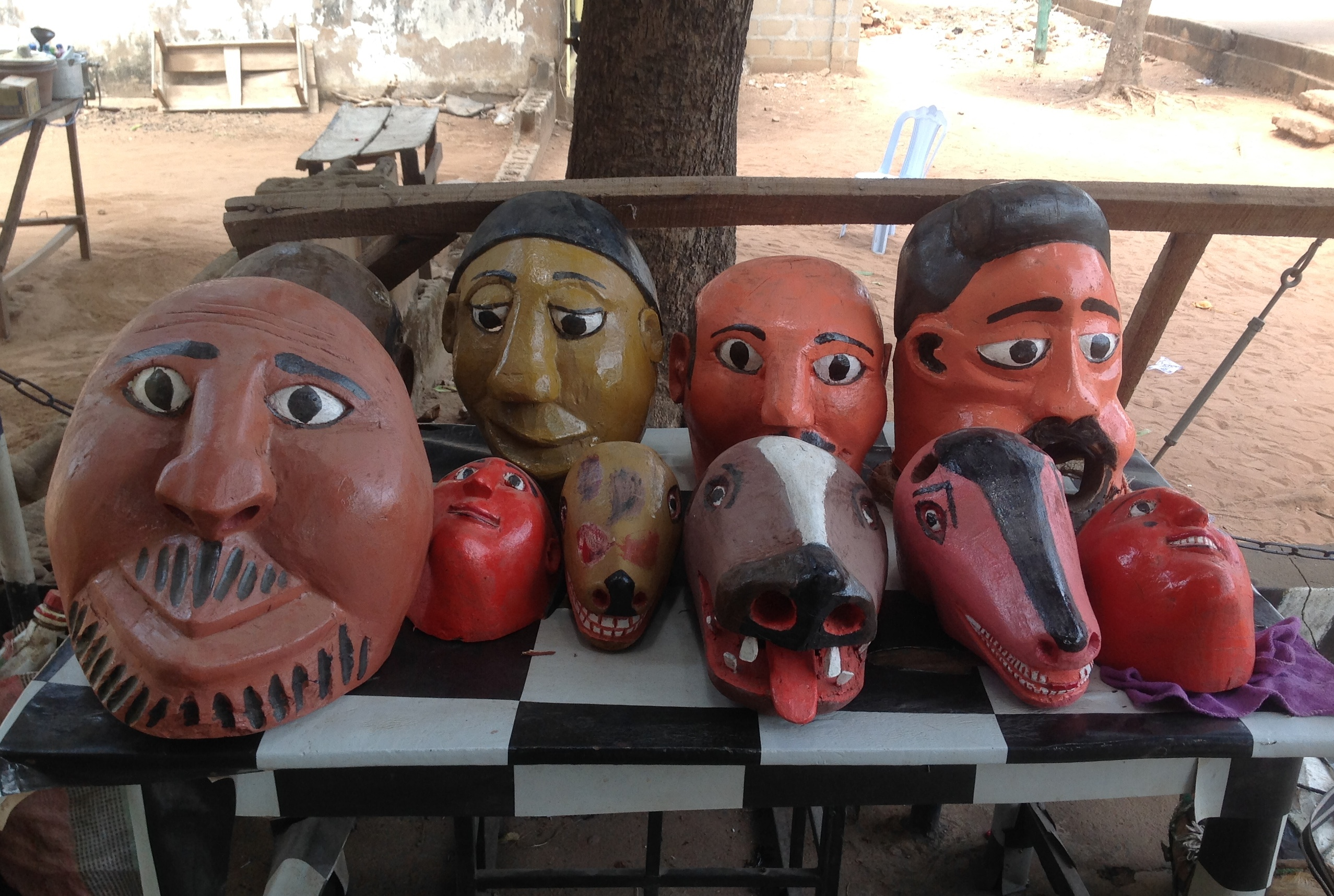
kwagh-hir masks on display in Makurdi, Benue State

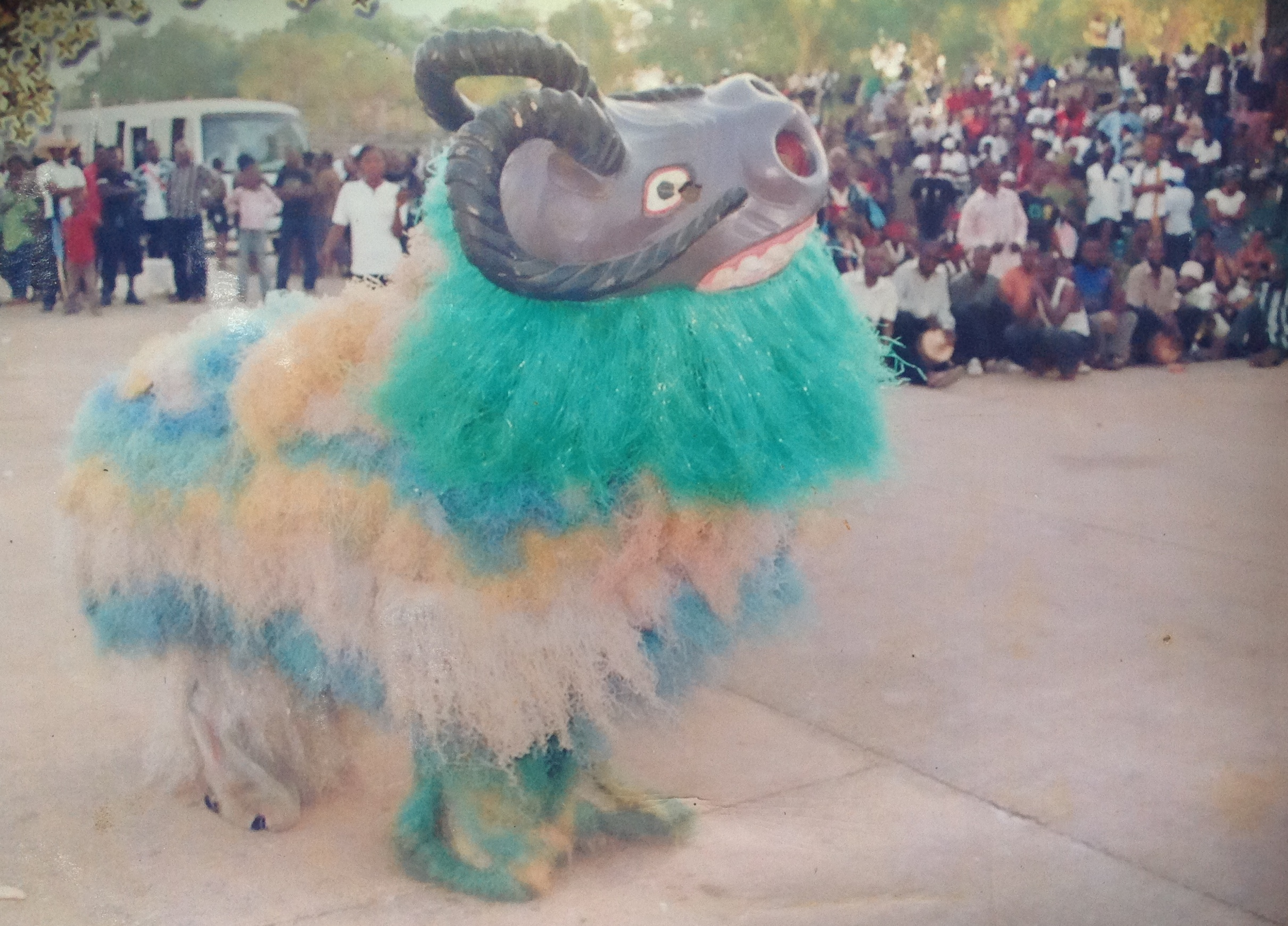
A kwagh-hir animated character performs during the Benue Youth Carnival

Kwagh-hir aesthetics are drawn from the patterns of the Tiv culture and depicts the Tiv understanding of their life. This is projected by the use of varied design concepts that are sewn into various styles so as to connote societal activities. The masks are elaborate and reflect the versatile aesthetic background of the Tiv people. It incorporates certain Tiv social dances like swange, gberichul, ihinga, ivom, iee, igbe, ibiamegh, girinya and other comic forms.

The sundry accoutrements of kwagh-hir all have a moral standpoints. The puppets are naturalistic, grotesque and even ridiculous, yet all reflecting the moral prejudices and sanctions of the Tiv society. Historical awareness is shown in some puppets which represents events such as when the first woman emerged or when modern dress styles of European design gained local acceptance.

The kwagh-hir puppets possess aesthetic characteristics such as triangular noses, Nok-like eyes, small lips and triangular nostrils. The colours used in painting the puppets are vibrant, because the kwagh-hir artists use colours straight from the source. There is no deliberate attempt at creating tones, shades or tints. Costumes for the masquerade are elaborately made and are also highly coloured.

Each of the masks and masquerade objects are crafted to depict symbolic action and movement that explains aspects of the Tiv worldview. Each mask nuances expresses, and interprets reality among human, animal, spirit, and environment. Each conveys deep emotions of fear, laughter, anger, love and even indifference. Each kwagh-hir character is associated with its appearance and creates a non-visual layer of recognition for audience members.

== Notable kwagh-hir artistic directors ==
The following are some of the notable Ator-a-Kwagh-hir (artistic directors):

- Apev Akaa
- Anande Chieshe
- Chia Gbagir
- Ayange Gwer
- Adasu Jirgba
- Kende Kaase
- Adikpo Songo

== Notes ==
A. This narration is a paraphrase of the interview Iyorwuese Hagher had with Adikpo Songu on 4 January 1978.
B. This section is a sample of how some kwagh-hir groups are organized, according to Iyorwuese Hagher.
