= Makir Zakpe =

First paramount ruler of the Tiv people (1896–1956)

His Royal Majesty, Begha U Tiv, Orchivirigh Makir Zakpe
- Tor Tiv

1st Tor Tiv
- Reign: 19 September 1946 – 11 October 1956
- Successor: Gondo Aluor
- Born: 11 April 1896; Mbayar, Mbaduku, Northern Nigeria Protectorate
- Died: 11 October 1956 (aged 60); Gboko, Northern Region, British Nigeria
- Burial: Abagu, Gboko
- House: Ipusu

Makir Zakpe (also written Makir Dzakpe or Zape; 11 April 1896 – 11 October 1956) was a Nigerian soldier, police officer and traditional ruler who became the first Tor Tiv, the paramount ruler of the Tiv people. He was selected for the newly created office on 19 September 1946 and remained Tor Tiv until his death in 1956.

== Early life ==
Zakpe was born on 11 April 1896 at Mbayar, Nyumagbagh, in Mbaduku District of present-day Vandeikya Local Government Area of Benue State. He was a member of the Kunav section of the Tiv and was the descendant of Kparev, a chief of the Ipusu, one of the two major genealogical divisions of the Tiv, which were later recognised for succession to the Tor Tiv stool. His mother was from Mbagen in present-day Buruku Local Government Area.

== Career ==
=== Military Career ===
Makir Zakpe was enlisted into the Royal West African Frontier Force (WAFF) stationed at Calabar in 1918 and was posted to the third battalion of the Southern Nigeria Regiment. He was part of the Nigerian forces that fought in the Second World War between 1939 and 1946, and was promoted to the rank of Battalion Sergeant Major (BSM) before retiring.

=== Law enforcement ===
On his retirement from the army, Makir Zakpe got enlisted into the Nigeria Police Force at the Jema’a Native Authority Police, Kafanchan where he was later transferred back home to Benue state to the Tiv Native Authority (TNA), Gboko as a police chief of the native authority police..

== Coronation as Tor Tiv ==
Makir Zakpe together with his fellow army veterans of the British West African Frontier Force (WAFF) of Tiv extraction like Lawrence Igyuse Doki started clamoring for a Tiv king on their return from the army. Their battles in the world war made them understand that they were all fighting for and against Kings. When they got back to Nigeria, The Tiv world war 2 veterans felt the British treated their own kin the Tiv people with injustice with their indirect rule strategy of governance. The Tiv people were divided into 3 factions and kept under the rulership of the Jukun minority at the North-East, Cross River state at the South-south and Lafia division at the North-West. They British went as far as appointing Audu Dan Afoba as Sarkin Makurdi(translated as King of Makurdi). This led to conflicts and riots and the pressure was on the governor of Nigeria, Sir Arthur Richards who permitted the Tiv people to choose their own king.

There was a lot of politicking among the local chiefs and influential tiv sons of the time but in September 1946, the groups resolved to two contestants. Makir Zakpe for the Ipusu royal house and Gondo Aluor for the Ichongo royal house. The vote was cast for the two contestants and Makir got the highest votes and was installed on 1 November 1947 by the governor of Nigeria in Gboko. He ruled as the Tor Tiv from his house at Joe Akaahan way, Gboko until his death.

=== Politics ===
In 1944, the governor of Nigeria, Sir Arthur Richard formally allowed the Tiv people to select a king. Chief Jato Aka of Turan and Ikyaagba Akpeye of Kunav were some of the first to receive the news and because of the respect accorded to them by the colonizers, they were almost the most suitable candidates except for the fact that they were very old men at the time. So, they decided to support other candidates.

Ikyaagba prepared his grandson Orya Chenge Ikyaagba and Jato Aka supported Gondo Aluor. The kunav people were not pleased with Ikyaagba's choice. Orya Chenge unfortunately died at Gboko. The atmosphere became so tense at Kunavland because there were allegations of witchcraft and the Tiv people alleged the cause of Oryas death to a mystical thunder strike ordered by other interested parties vying for the throne from Kunavland.

Ikyaagba being an old man was heartbroken but now furious. So, he schemed for the throne to go to any other part of tivland but not his kindred the kunav people. His schemes were almost successful as Gondo Aluor was scheduled to be crowned as the first Tor Tiv the next day. The news about Ikyaagba's plans was leaked to other Kunav chiefs by a man called Abela Manta. The Kunav chiefs immediately convened at night and extended an invitation to Ikyaagba. In attendance were chiefs, Achir Mede, Adamgbe Adasu, Uchir Zungwe and Agbo Kpire. Apologies were offered to Ikyaagba about the death of his grandson and a reconciliation and a resolution was made. They had a unanimous candidate, Makir Zakpe, a world war 2 veteran from Kunav.

On the day of the coronation which was the next day, the Kunav chiefs used their sons Igeege Fate and Deem Kpum who were the interpreters of the British Governor Sir Arthur Richard to foster their agenda. They told the tiv council of chiefs that the governor said a king cannot be chosen at his absence and in turn told the governor that the Tiv think its more honorable to choose a king in his presence.

The tiv chiefs then waited on Ikyaagba to speak since he was the most respected by the whites and was part of the initial agreement for the Gondo Aluor kingship. Ikyaagba simply motioned to Agbo Kpire. Agbo Kpire told the council of elders that Ikyaagba said, the new king will be his walking stick so his choice is Makir Zakpe and then re-emphasised on the need for a new king who is a war veteran because the war veterans were the ones that brought about campaign for a new king and then rounded it up with a saying; Kpan ka a tese ambi akula.(translated as when a slave shows you faeces he packs it up).

This did not sit well with the other contender Gondo Aluor and some of his supporters. So he got up and asked Ikyaagba if this was the agreement they had yesterday. To which Agbo Kpire answered; dzwa kaa kwagh mom ga (which translates, the mouth didn't say anything).

The disagreement was apparent to the governor so he asked for a vote. Makir Zakpe became victorious with 25 votes while Gondo Aluor got 11 votes and 18 chiefs did not vote. The governor then rescheduled the coronation date for 3 April 1947 and Makir Zakpe was crowned the first Tor Tiv.

The confirmation of Makir Dzakpe as the first Tor Tiv marked the climax in the political development of the Tiv. The appointment also contributed a great deal to the resolution of the looming crisis following the death of Audu Dan Afoda in 1945.

== Reign ==
Zakpe was the president of the Tiv Central Council (also referred to as the Ijir Tamen) of Tor Tiv. As a part of colonial administration, he acted as an advocate of the Tiv before government officials and was responsible for maintaining peace and order, collecting taxes and recruiting labour, and resolving conflicts.

His administration thus found itself in a limbo. The office had been created in part in response to the Tiv's demands for acknowledged political representation and had also been taken up into the colonial system of indirect rule. Zakpe had to balance the instructions of the government with a society that had never had a single central authority.

Zakpe also became a spokesman for the Tiv in their dealings with the colonial and Northern regional authorities. Later reports say that he was at one time suspended when he opposed government policies that were seen as contrary to the political traditions of the Tiv.

As a Tor Tiv, he made sure there were no conflicts in any part of Tivland. As a military veteran, he understood conflict resolution and applied it wisely among his people. He also approved the construction of the Tor Tiv office building. He also wiped out the 1948 Garyo movement.

== Death and succession ==
Makir Zakpe died at 60 in Gboko on October 11, 1956, after a brief illness that was not made public. He was buried at Abagu Gboko on October 14, 1956. This has become the burial ground of all other successive Tor Tiv.

His successor was his former competitor, Ichongo contender Gondo Aluor. The accession of Aluor brought in the custom of rotating the Tor Tiv stool between Ipusu and Ichongo divisions.

== See also ==
- Tor Tiv
- Tiv people
- Gondo Aluor
- Akperan Orshi
- Alfred Akawe Torkula
- James Ayatse
