= Mangwa Kortar =

Nigerian professor of orthopedic surgery

Namgwa Joseph Kortor is a Nigerian professor of orthopedic surgery. He is currently the Chief Medical Director of Federal Medical Centre, Makurdi. He is a Fellow of the National Postgraduate Medical College of Nigeria, Fellow of the West African College of Surgeons, Member, Nigerian Medical Association amongst several other memberships.
