= James Ayatse =

Nigerian academic and traditional ruler

James Ortese Ayatse
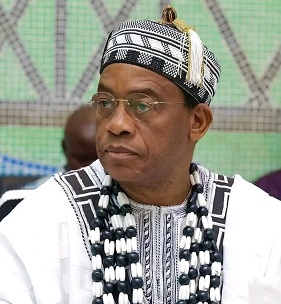

Tor Tiv V
- Incumbent
- Assumed office 4 March 2017
- Preceded by: Alfred Akawe Torkula

Chancellor of Abia State University
- Incumbent
- Assumed office 2019

Vice Chancellor of the University of Agriculture, Makurdi
- In office 2001–2006
- Preceded by: Erastus Orseer Gyanggyang
- Succeeded by: Daniel Vershima Uza

Vice Chancellor of Federal University, Dutsin-Ma
- In office 2011–2016
- Succeeded by: Haruna Kaita

Personal details
- Born: James Ortese Iorzua Ayatse; 12 May 1956 (age 70) Shangev-Ya, Kwande, Benue State, Nigeria
- Party: Non-partisan
- Spouse: Felicia Hembadoon Ayatse
- Children: 5
- Parent(s): Iorzua and Adeior Ayatse
- Education: Government Secondary School, Gboko; University of Ibadan; University of Calabar; University of Surrey, England
- Profession: Teacher; Administrator

James Ortese Iorzua Ayatse, Tor Tiv V (born 12 May 1956) from Kwande Local Government Area of Benue State in central Nigeria is a Nigerian academic who is the Paramount Ruler/King of Tiv Nation and president, Tiv Area Traditional Council and chairman, Benue State council of Chiefs. He previously served as the vice chancellor of the University of Agriculture, Makurdi and the pioneer vice chancellor of the Federal University, Dutsin-Ma respectively before succeeding Alfred Akawe Torkula, Tor Tiv IV, who ruled from 1991 until his death on 22 November 2015.

Ayatse was elected on Tuesday, 20 December 2016, and crowned on 4 March 2017, by the Kingmakers after a meeting of the Tiv Supreme Council known as Ijir Tamen, held at the chambers of the Tiv Traditional Council at Gboko - a city recognized as the Traditional Headquarters of the Tiv people who are believed to be the 4th largest ethnic group in Nigeria. Prior to becoming Tor Tiv V, Ayatse, an academic became a professor of biochemistry in his late thirties and would later serve as the vice chancellor in two separate Federal universities between 2001 and 2006 and 2011 – 2016 respectively, making him only the first Tiv man to do so. As Tor Tiv V, Ayatse is also the first Tiv man to ever rule his subjects as a professor. In contrast with his predecessor who took Oath of Office for the Tor Tiv Throne swearing by the ancestral “Swem”, Ayatse swore by the Christian Bible, becoming the second Tor Tiv, after Tor Tiv III Akperan Orshi, to take Oath of Office using the Bible. President Mohammadu Buhari congratulated the Monarch, stating that Ayatse's emergence as the paramount ruler of the Tiv people, is an affirmation of his strength of character, integrity, and moral authority, garnered over the years as a lecturer, erudite scholar and administrator.

== Early life ==
James Ayatse was born to Iorzua Ayatse and Adeior Iorzua (née Achaa, Mbarumun, Nanev) in Mbakaan, Shangev-Ya, Kwande Local Government Area in the North-East province of Benue State. He received elementary schooling at LGEA School, Orbiam, Ikov, Ushongo Local Government Area and later, LGEA School, Mbagbegba, Shangev-Ya and St Anne's Primary School Adikpo where he obtained his First School Leaving Certificate. He attended and passed out with a West African School Certificate (WASC) – a division one certificate at Government Secondary School, Gboko that qualified him for university education. Ayatse then proceeded to the University of Ibadan, where he earned a Bachelor of Science degree in biochemistry. He went on to obtain his Master of Science at the University of Calabar before moving to the University of Surrey, Guildford, United Kingdom as a Commonwealth student for further studies that culminated in a doctorate in biochemistry. The Tor Tiv then returned to one of his alma maters – the University of Calabar for his MBA and rose to become a professor of biochemistry, making him the first Tiv man to achieve this.

== Career ==
Ayatse started his career in 1980, as a graduate assistant in the University of Calabar and progressed steadily to the rank of a professor of Biochemistry in 1993, at the age of 37. His career spans teaching to education management. He taught at the University of Calabar, University of Uyo, Benue State University, Makurdi, University of Agriculture, Makurdi, University of Abuja and the Federal university, Dutisn-Ma. He taught biochemistry, Business Management and Public Administration to different groups of students and has bred several B.Sc., M.Sc., MBA, MPA and PhD holders in his over 35 years teaching career. Ayatse has served as External Assessor for Professional appointments/Promotions and External Examiner to a large number of universities; he chaired the National Universities Committees on performance indicators and minimum benchmark for science programmes in Nigerian Universities. He also chaired several panels for the accreditation of science programmes in Nigerian Universities. He served in the capacity of Chairman or member of several communities or governing boards at international, national and state levels. He was involved on three separate occasions in formulation of the vision and blueprint for the development of his own state of Benue.

In 2001, Ayatse was appointed the Vice Chancellor of the University of Agriculture, Makurdi succeeding Erastus Gyang. Reflecting on this in an interview preceding his emergence as Tor Tiv V, Ayatse stated that he inherited a student population of about 2000 and fluctuating cases of violent students’ demonstrations as well as staff union strikes, all of which he helped resolved amicably as the Vice Chancellor of the School. This earned him the reputation as the most peace loving Vice Chancellor of the Institution as there was no student demonstrations arising from internal problems throughout his tenure. He expanded the university by establishing several new departments and colleges that yielded students’ population of about 7000 before the end of his five-year tenure as the Vice Chancellor.

In 2011, Ayatse was appointed as the Pioneer Vice Chancellor of the Federal University, Dutsin-Ma – one of the nine Federal Universities established by President Goodluck Jonathan’s Administration. Ayatse went on to become the 1st Vice Chancellor out of the nine Federal Universities established at the time to graduate students and Mobilize them for Mandatory National Youth Service Corps (NYSC). He also conducted the maiden convocation of the university before completing his 5-year tenure. He laid the foundation for an ICT-driven University with computerized and online services, prompting Webometrics to rate the Federal University, Dutsin-Ma as the 14th Best University in January 2015 and 2016 ahead of many older universities in Nigeria.

Ayatse married Felicia Hembadoon Ayatse; they have five children.

== Emergence and coronation as Tor Tiv V ==
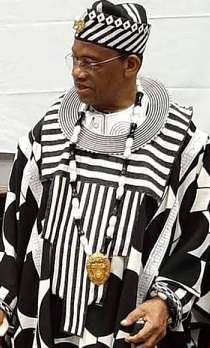
Tor Tiv at MUTUK

After being vice chancellor of the Federal University, Dutsin-Ma, Ayatse was elected on Tuesday, 20 December 2016, in a keen contest with three other contenders. He polled 39 votes out of the possible 46 to defeat fellow contestants –Daniel Saror, a former vice chancellor of Ahmadu Bello University; Zaria who scored three votes; Benedict Shinku, who also got three votes; and Andrew Wombo, a lawyer who scored one vote. Ayatse was crowned as Tor Tiv V on 4 March 2017. Governor Samuel Ortom of Benue State presented him with Staff of Office.

== Controversy ==
On 12 July 2016, the incumbent vice chancellor of the Federal University, Dutsin-Ma, (FUDMA), Haruna Kaita, ordered a probe of recruitments, payments and admissions under his predecessor, Ayatse, stating that the decision to set up the committee was sequel to petitions received from the public against the pioneer vice chancellor of the university.

However, the white paper on the report of the visitation panel into the affairs of the Federal University, Dutsin-Ma (2011-2015) concluded that the university, had made substantial progress between 2011 and 2015, particularly considering that it was a newly established university, It stated that FUDMA was ahead of the other new federal universities established in 2011 in infrastructural and academic development as of December 2015. The report stated that the university's projects were completed and relevant to teaching, research and learning, while funds received were “judiciously and frugally applied.”

== Awards ==
In October 2022, a Nigerian national honor of Commander Of The Order Of The Federal Republic (CFR) was conferred on him by President Muhammadu Buhari.

== See also ==
- Tor Tiv
- Tiv people
- Makir Zakpe
- Gondo Aluor
- Akperan Orshi
- Alfred Akawe Torkula
