= Tiv religion and beliefs =

Traditional spiritual beliefs in Nigeria

The Tiv religious beliefs or Jighjigh u nan u Tiv, comprises the traditional and spiritual beliefs of the Tiv people. In the 21st century, most Tiv people are Christians, but some traditional practices are observed by some Tiv people.

== In Central Africa ==
The Tiv people were traditionally monotheists, and local accounts state that the Tiv come from an individual called Takuluku. Their origin story is a bit similar to that of other Bantu groups; the Zulu, for example, refer to this original individual as Unkulunkulu. Takuluku was created by a God called Aondo. From the accounts of Laura Bohannan, the Tiv say Aondo is no longer interested in them and has left them and gone to settle in heaven, so they too are not interested in Aondo. God in their view created both the forces of evil and good. He also, created the heavens and the earth after which he walked away.

The oldest male who is known for his honesty and integrity can communicate with Aondo especially when there is flood, drought or poor farm yield (whatever kind of natural disaster experienced). He calls out openly in a loud voice; "Aondo u Abaver, Aondo u Yookov" (English: God of Abraham, God of Jacob) and states his petition.

Spirits and ancestors do not interfere with the forces that manipulate health, wealth, harmony, animals and crop fertility and the natural states of things. Evil forces can be activated by human acts and vices.

== Present location ==
see also : N.K.S.T
Roman Catholic Diocese of Makurdi

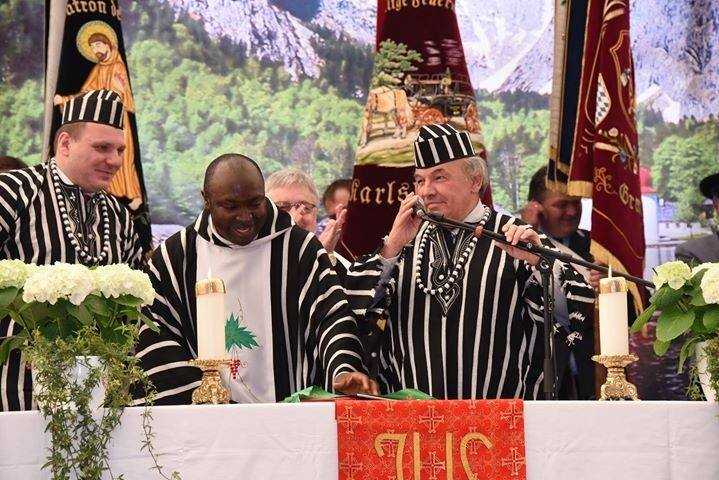
A Tiv and European Catholic priests in native Tiv attire

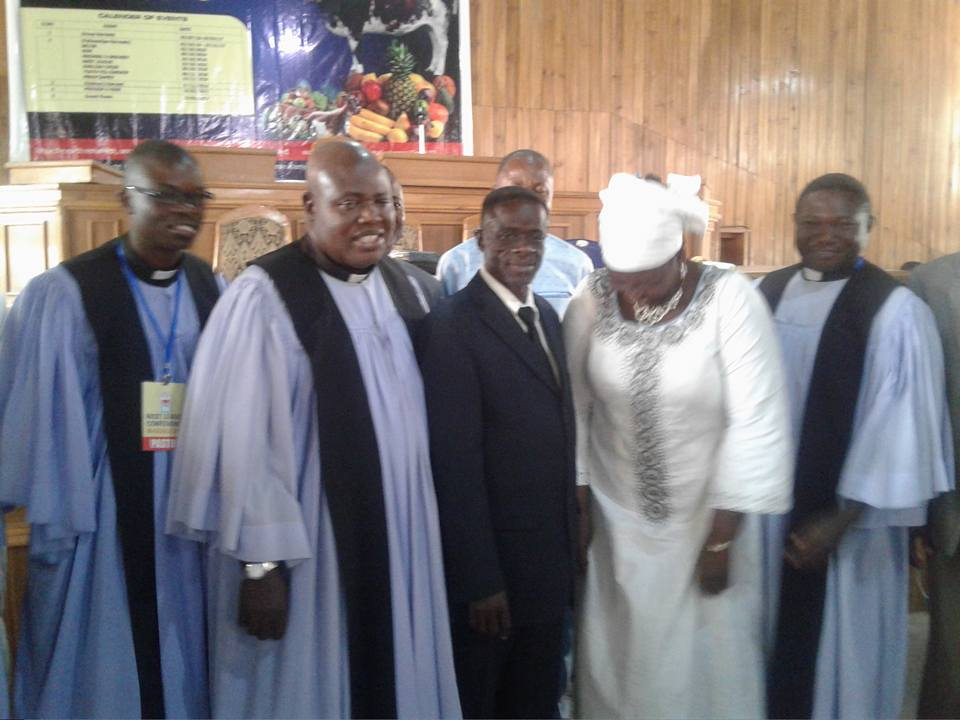
Some pastors and a member of the NKST

The Tiv belief system has evolved a lot. There has been a lot of integration with other cultures due to migration. Some of the practices and beliefs are practices adopted from the fulani and some Cross river tribes. Such practices are mixed with Tsav and the akombo. For example, Girinya, Atsuku, ityough ki ayu, imborivungu etc.

Christianity and Western colonization has dramatically changed what was left of the religious practices they brought from central Africa and other adopted practices in their present location.

== Tsav ==
Tsav is a complex cosmic potency that is internalized in an individual and forms or integrates to be part of his personality. It can be a sign or a source of special kind of abilities. It is not present in all people. A group of people with tsav is called mbatsav. It can also be enhanced. Some writers call mbatsav witches while others don't totally agree because they state that the aim of tsav is for the good of the community but some individuals use it for selfish motives. No one knows the detail of any tsav activity except the mbatsav people and God. Examples of tsav are; great musical and artistic ability, consistent political power, ability to live to an old age, the Kwagh-Hir(because it demonstrates ingenuity and special talent).

Highly skilled mbatsav meet at night to regulate the use of cosmic and social forces for the benefit of the family, clan, tribe etc. They also meet at the end of every funeral to determine the cause of death of the individual.

== Akombo ==
The Tiv akombo are rituals performed by mbatsav. It exists as figurines, pots, amulets or plants and are sometimes associated with certain diseases. Every akombo is different and requires a distinct ritual to pacify or activate it. Akombo can be manipulated by a highly skilled ormbtsav to cause, sickness, diseases, luck and also death. When any misfortune(like disease) befalls an individual, witchdoctors or diviners are consulted to determine the exact akombo that is in effect in other to neutralize it and also remove the malice(ibo) that activated it before any medical treatment works.

=== Types of Akombo ===
==== Small Akombo ====
Applicable on human health, life, property, wealth, personal gains/loss, farm yield. These can be manipulated by one individual with tsav (ormbatsav). Example is the imborivungu.

==== Great Akombo ====
Applicable to groups and communities and is manipulated by a group of people with tsav(mbatsav). Example is Swem karagbe.

=== Swem Karagbe ===
The first Tiv writer, Akiga Sai, stated that The tiv people believe Swem is a great akombo by which they swear but Swem is rather a mountain located in the Cameroon. Akiga visited the mountain with Mr La Grange and Mr Brinks. Karagbe however, was a Tiv man from the Nongov clan who was revered and honored by the Tiv people. He commanded the kind of respect and reverence which the Tiv only accorded to priests, native doctors or highly accomplished mbatsav. He belonged to the capable few who would not just travel to Swem but would also communicate with Aondo. In one of his journeys, he returned with a pot with shrubs to the Tiv people during the reign of the second Tor Tiv, Zaki Gondo Aluor and called it swem. Thus the origin of swem karagbe which is used by less than 1percent of tiv people.
