= Terhemen Tarzoor =

Nigerian politician

Dr Terhemen Tarzoor
- Born: Terhemen Tarzoor; 26 January 1972 (age 54); Makurdi, Nigeria
- Education: Mount St Gabriel Secondary School Makurdi
- Alma mater: Benue State University
- Occupations: Economist, Real Estate Developer, Businessman
- Spouse: Mrs. Sophie Erdoo Tarzoor
- Children: 4

Terhemen Tarzoor (born 26 January 1972) is a Nigerian Economist and Real Estate Developer from Makurdi Local Government Area of Benue State in North Central Nigeria who currently serves as Nigerian Ambassador to Namibia. He previously served as Speaker in the Benue State House of Assembly in which he represented his constituency. Tarzoor came to prominence when he ran unsuccessfully for the seat of the Governor of Benue State, losing to Samuel Ortom in the 2015 General Elections. He finished runner-up despite running as a favorite candidate on the platform of the then ruling People's Democratic Party (PDP). He went on to challenge the result of the election in a petition filed to the Benue State Governorship Tribunal claiming that the winner, Governor Samuel Ortom, was not validly nominated to contest for the seat. His claim was however dismissed by the court of appeal on grounds that it lacked merit.

On 30 April 2017 the Daily Trust Newspaper reported that Tarzoor hopes to re-contest for the seat in the on-coming 2019 general elections. On 12 July 2017, there were newspaper reports that Tarzoor narrowly escaped death in an attack by political thugs at Yandev in Gboko, the home town of his wife Sophie. Other newspapers captured a different version of the story with claims that Tarzoor was involved in the crisis which led to him being summoned for police interrogation.

== Early life ==
He was born to the family of the late Chief Tarzoor Orbiam, immediate past Tyoor Mbawa and Mue Ter Mbawa in Makurdi Local Government Traditional Council and Mama Chive Orbiam of Mbawa, Sherev, Makurdi Local Government Area of Benue State. Prince Tarzoor received elementary education at All Saints Anglican Primary School, Makurdi and had a brief stint at Community Secondary School Makurdi where he earned his Junior School Certificate of Education (JSCE) before proceeding to Mount Saint Gabriel's Secondary School to obtain his Senior School Certificate of Education (SSCE) in 1991. Prince Tarzoor secured admission into the School of General and Remedial Studies (now College of Advanced and Professional Studies) from where he proceeded to the then newly established Benue State University Makurdi to undergo a Bachelor of Science Degree in Economics, graduating in 1999. He performed his mandatory National Youth Service Corps service at the Central Bank of Nigeria in Enugu between 2000 and 2001. Tarzoor further obtained a Master of Science Degree in Business Administration (MBA), majoring in Banking and Finance in the year 2003 from the same university. In 2006 he obtained an additional Master of Science (M.Sc.) Degree in Economics with specifics in Monetary economics, completing in 2009. He went on to earn a doctorate degree from the same institution.
