= TBT Hospital Gboko =

Geography
- Location: Yandev Road, Gboko, Benué State, Nigeria
- Coordinates: 7.345060°N 9.012939°E

Links
- Lists: Hospitals in Nigeria

TBT Hospital Gboko established by TBT Gwabi (Nig.) Limited, is a hospital situated along Captain Downes' Road in Gboko, the heartland of the Tiv nation to provide an adequate health care system so as to reduce morbidity and mortality among the people of Benué State and its environs.
