= Special Science Senior Secondary School =

School in Benue State, Nigeria

Information
- Established: 1995; 31 years ago
- Age: 15 to 18

Special Science Senior Secondary School is a Senior Secondary School (ages 15–18) in Makurdi, Nigeria, specialising in science education. It is a government school founded in 1995 by David Ker, later vice chancellor of Benue State University, with the aim of enhancing science education in the state. The school has a comprehensive library, and hostels for boarding students.

The school has been involved in research as well as teaching, with teacher Ahura Simeon inventing a "multipurpose solar energy device" in 2009 as part of a national competition organised by the Nigerian National Petroleum Corporation, Mobil and the Science Teachers Association of Nigeria. over hundreds of the students are highly recommend in their various areas of discipline.
