= Akawe Torkula Polytechnic =

University in Makurdi, Benue, Nigeria

- Type: Polytechnic
- Established: 2020
- Rector: Dr.Moses Agena
- Location: Makurdi, Benue, Nigeria; 7°43′56″N 8°32′21″E
- Campus: Rural

Akawe Torkula Polytechnic (ATP) is a polytechnic in Makurdi, Benue State, North Central Nigeria. It came into being when Akawe Torkula College of Advanced and Professional Studies, ATCAPS, was upgraded to a polytechnic by the Benue State Executive Council in January 2020.

== Staff Recruitment ==
In June 2021, the Benue State Government recruited both teaching and non-teaching staff for the institution.

== Rector ==
On the 25th of April 2024 benue state governor Dr. Hyacinth Iormem Alia appointed Dr.Martin Moses Agenda as the Rector of the polytechnic.
