= Old Bridge, Makurdi =

Bridge in Nigeria

Coordinates: 7.7419°N 8.5407°E

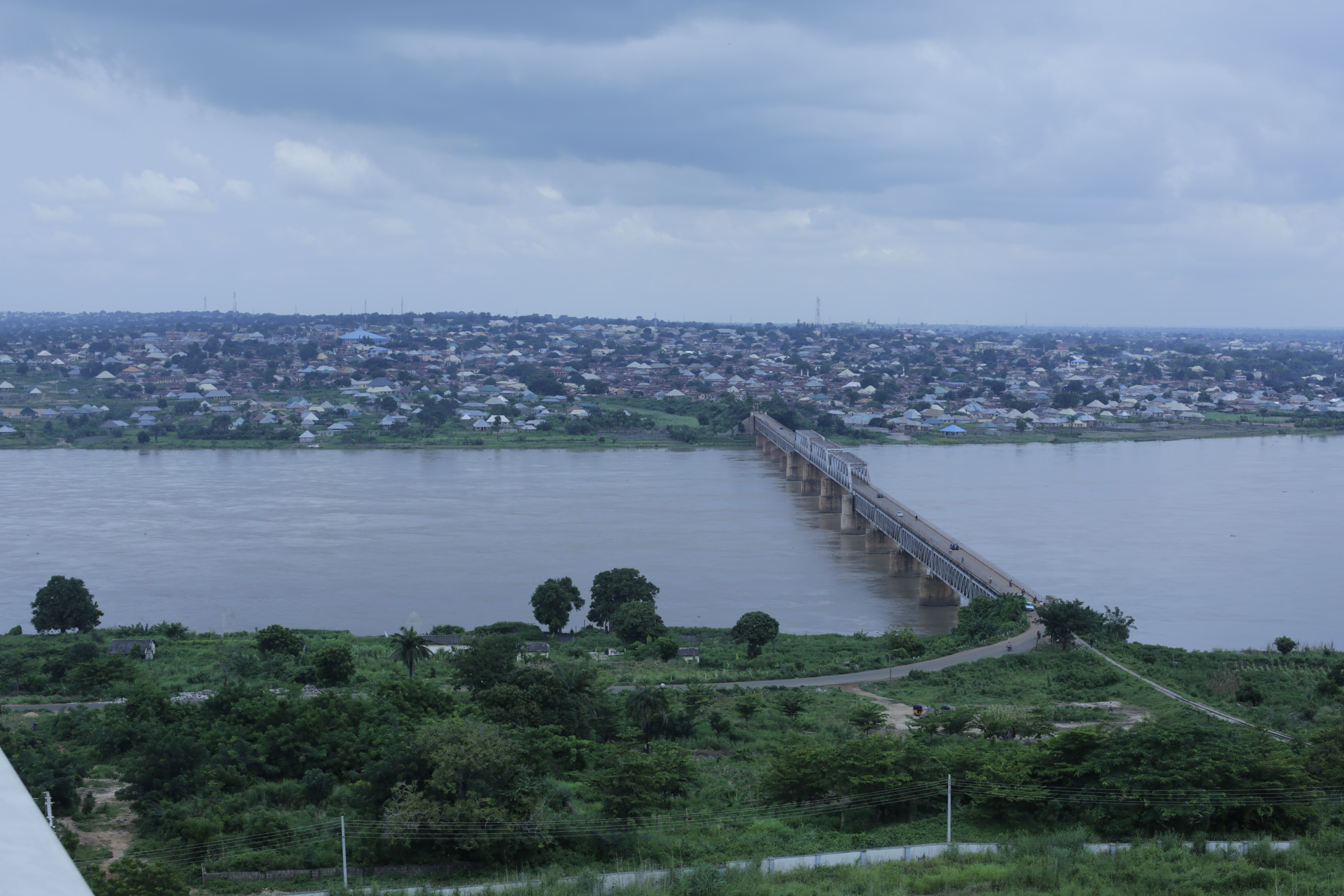
Makurdi old bridge

The Old Bridge, Makurdi is a combined rail and road bridge over the Benue River at Makurdi, Nigeria. The structure was completed in 1932.

== Construction ==
Construction of the bridge started in 1928, and it was opened by Donald Cemeron on 24 May 1932 to coincide with the celebration of Empire Day. The span of the bridge is about half a mile, and the distance between abutments is 2,584 feet (788 m). The bridge was built to replace the Nigerian railway's ferry service that conveyed passengers across the Benue at Makurdi. The cost of the bridge was about £1,000,000, and it was constructed by Sir William Arrol & Co. At the time of its construction, it was one of the largest undertakings by the British in Africa and the longest bridge in Africa. The track spacing is 3 ft 6 in gauge. The site was chosen because of the narrowness of the river and the elevation of the land above the river (about 200 feet [61 m]) at this point.
