= Federal Medical Centre, Makurdi =

Federal Medical Centre in Nigeria

Geography
- Location: No 1 Atiku Abubakar Road, Mission Ward Makurdi, Benue State, Nigeria

Organisation
- Care system: Public

Services
- Emergency department: Yes

History
- Founded: 1967

Links
- Website: fmcmakurdi.gov.ng
- Lists: Hospitals in Nigeria

Federal Medical Centre, Makurdi is a federal government of Nigeria medical centre located in Makurdi, Benue State, Nigeria. The current chief medical director is Prof. Namgwa J. Kortor.

== History ==
Federal Medical Centre, Makurdi was established in 1967. The hospital was formerly known as General Hospital, Makurdi.

== Management Staff ==
- Prof. Namgwa Joseph Kortor - CHIEF MEDICAL DIRECTOR
- Dr. Donatus Dzuachii -Head of Clinical Services
- Mr. David Terhemba Abakume -Director of Administration
- Nrs Ekefan Elizabeth Ebenezer -HOD Nursing Services
- Dr. Bem Tar -Principal Investigator/Team Lead HIV programme
- Mr. Mfe Inga -Director of Finance

== Throughout the years, the following individuals have had the privilege of serving as Medical Directors of the hospital. ==
- Dr. Samuel Tor Agbidye 1995-1999
- Dr. King David Terna Yawe 1999-2003
- Dr. O.O. Dokumu 2003-2008
- Dr. Matthias Oyigeya 2008-2014
- Dr. Peteru Msuega Inundugh 2015-2023
- Prof. Namgwa Joseph Kortor 1st August, 2023-Till Date

The former chief medical director of the medical center is Peter Inunduh which is succeeded by Prof. Mangwa J. Kortar.

In 2023, president Bola Armed appointed Prof. Mangwa J. Kortar as the new chief medical director for the medical center.

== Department ==
- Department of Accident and emergency
- Department of dental service
- Department of medical laboratory
- Department inpatient care
- Department of Diagnostic imaging
- Department of rehabilitation services
- Department of Ecg test
- Department of amenities and retainership
- Department of social welfare services
- Department of paedratics
- Department of outpatient.

== Project commission ==
=== Amenities ward ===
There is opening of special amenities care ward in the medical center to provide a quality medical care to patients and affordable medical care .

In June 2024, there is commission/Renovation of new molecular lab in federal government medical center makurdi, this is to improve the efficiency of the test and research in the medical lab.
