= Lawrence Igyuse Doki =

Nigerian army officer (1923–1981)

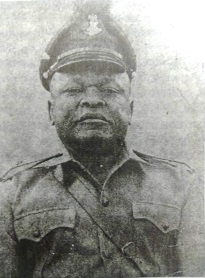
- Born: August 24, 1923; Mbaduku, Vandeikya
- Died: November 5, 1981 (aged 58); Makurdi, Benue State, Nigeria
- Burial place: Mbaduku, Vandeikya
- Military career
- Allegiance: British Empire, Federal Republic of Nigeria
- Branch: Royal West African Frontier Force, Nigerian Army
- Service years: 1940- 1946 and 1965–1972
- Rank: Second Lieutenant
- Nickname: Tor shoja
- Conflicts: World War II, Nigerian Civil War

Lawrence Igyuse Doki or Gyuse Doki was a World War II veteran and a Tiv hero. He together with other army veterans like Makir Zakpe are hailed as the emancipators of tiv people in the 1940s.

== Early life ==
Lawrence was born on August 24, 1923, at Mbaduku, Vandeikya local government area. His father was Doki Abua Tortya of Mbaaposugh, Mbaadigam, of Nyumagbagh council ward in Mbaduku District, Vandeikya. He lost his parents as a child.

He schooled at St Patricks catholic school Tavaku(Taraku) in the present day Gwer East local government of Benue state from 1934 and graduated on September 30, 1940, with a standard six certificate.

== Military career ==
=== Royal West African Frontier Force ===
He was conscripted into the Royal West African Frontier Force (RWAFF) in 1940. Ten days after he graduated at the age of 17.

On January 27, 1941, he was sent to the war front in Kenya where he displayed courage and dexterity under the command of General George Giffard. As a result of his exceptional abilities, he was transferred to Gold Coast (British colony) and was appointed the drilling officer of the new west African recruits from the Gold coast regiment.

Doki was promoted from the rank of a private to the rank of Company Sergeant Major, CSM and served under Lieutenant General Francis Nosworthy and later under Lieutenant General Montagu Brocas Burrows.

He was demobilized from the West African Frontier Force in 1946 following the end of WW II.

=== The Nigerian army ===
Doki and some other war veterans were conscripted into the Nigerian army in 1965. He was still in the army during the Nigerian Civil War in 1967. He fought on the Nigerian side with Lieutenant Colonel Akaahan Joseph Agbo.

In 1972, two years after the Nigerian Civil War ended, he retired as a second lieutenant to his home town at Mbaduku.

== The Emancipator ==
Prior to the crowning of the first Tor Tiv, His Royal Majesty, Makir Zakpe, the tiv people felt marginalized by the colonial British government. The Tiv World War II veterans felt the British treated their own kin with injustice through the indirect rule system of governance. The Tiv were divided into 3 factions and kept under the rulership of the Jukun minority at the North-East, Cross river at the South-south and Lafia division at the North-West. The British went as far as appointing Audu Dan Afoda as Sarkin Makurdi(translated as King of Makurdi). Dan Afoda was accorded further preeminence by leading the Tiv delegations to the periodic northern Nigerian chiefs meeting in Kaduna, which was the regional colonial headquarters.

Now, Makurdi was almost being deserted by the Tiv. Most of them moved towards Lafia. According to Makar, The Tiv Resented the Hausa influence in Makurdi town although they did not object to their presence. The Tiv resented the Hausa control of the courts, political power and landed property...scarcely could the Tiv secure plots of land or find accommodation in Makurdi when they were in transit

Doki and some of the World War II veterans like Aemberga Samu, Tsenzughul Tyungu, Ishi Wayo, Gbir Agera started the agitation from Comilla, Bangladesh(formerly India). They wrote a letter to D.F.H. Macbride who was the acting resident of Benue Province requesting him to appoint a Tor Tiv. Macbride denied the request as it was against the colonial policy of the British.

On his return from the world war, Doki and his comrades in arms decided to start protests against the perceived hausa caliphate being imposed by the British. Ochonu posits that, Prior to the riots, The Tiv kept Hausa-Fulani Caliphate agents in check by carefully monitoring their activities on the frontiers of Tivland, by attacking their isolated outposts and trade caravans, by strategically interacting with them, and by building a feared warring infrastructure founded on the infamous Tiv poisoned arrow.

In 1945, Audu Dan Afoda who was the Sarkin Makurdi suddenly died. The British quickly tried to crown his son to succeed him which resulted into the Makurdi riots of 1946 led by Doki. To quell the violence, the governor of Nigeria, Sir Arthur Richard had to re-visit the demand by the tiv veterans for a King. The violence dislodged the planned Audu Dan Afoda dynastic rule in Makurdi and a Tor Tiv was elected.

== Incarceration ==
Of all the war veterans, only Makir Zakpe benefitted from the agitation. Even though Doki and his comrades at arms emancipated Makurdi from the Hausa-Muslim control, Makondo Igbon, of Nyiev, Ihyarev was made the first tiv chief of Makurdi.

Nonetheless, Doki and his comrades were subjected to internal humiliation and arrested, tried and convicted. Doki as the leader was sentenced to seven years and eight months in Enugu prison.

== Aftermath ==
Doki was released from prison after seven years and eight months of incarceration but, the Tor Tiv, Makir Zakpe due to political reasons had to banish him alongside his comrades from Tivland. Doki was exiled to Western Nigeria but returned in 1959 which was 3 years after Makir's death.

== Death ==
After a successful military career, imprisonment, exile and a stint in politics, Doki spent his last days in Tilley Gyado College, Makurdi as a Boarding Master (B.M) from 1974 to 1981. He died on November 5, 1981, at the age of 58.

== Posthumous award ==
The gallantry, heroism and patriotism of Second Lieutenant Doki were posthumously recognized and honoured by his kinsmen the Kunav traditional council, with a chieftaincy title as "Nomor u Kunav" (translated as Kunav man of valor) on the 22 April 2000.

== Legacy ==
Makurdi got only Tiv Chiefs after what Doki and his comrades at arms did. It became the capital of Benue state in 1976 and is one of the important cities in Nigeria. A street is named after him in the city.
