= Government Secondary School, North-Bank =

School in Nigeria

Government Secondary School, North-Bank, located in Makurdi, Benue State, Nigeria, is a secondary school that is located in the barracks of the 72nd airborne brigade of the Nigerian Army in Makurdi, Benue State. It is a government school that is run with the help of the military arm of the government.
