= MolecularLab =

MolecularLab is an Italian website of science, specialized in science, biotechnology, molecular biology, with news, forums, and events. With over 4 million page views in May 2009 it is the most visited Italian science webzine.

== Purpose ==
MolecularLab has several objectives:

- Providing the latest news and important discoveries in the biotechnology, medical, and molecular fields
- Developing the building of a community, allowing the encounter and cultural exchange among researchers, teachers, and companies
- Deepening techniques of molecular biology and cellular technologies with an educational section for university students, enriched with video and interactive animations

== History ==
The site was founded in 2001 by Riccardo Fallini with the publication of notes from a degree course. In 2003 the Molecularlab.it site was created and then has gradually added new features: to the didactics was added daily news and then a community. It was the first news organization specializing on Italian science daily.

One of the features of this site has been the intensive use of systems for distribution of news: custom feeds to be updated on certain categories or topics, News Ticker and widgets to spread to other sites, an ICS file to sync with the events reported by MolecularLab, and other tools as plugins to search the site by the browser. Since January 2006 MolecularLab is in partnership with World Community Grid to promote the use of computers in biomedical research.

During the first years, the comments associated to the news were free making it possible for users to open discussions of interest. From 2007, comments were moderated and limited to registered users.

Later a multimedia section, a directory science, a section for beginners, and a glossary were added. The last section consists of a quiz.

The newspaper, now owned by Richard Fallini, works with the European information system CORDIS and the association for consumers Aduc, receives press releases from the major Italian research institutions, and operates through some researchers to the first scientific blog network in Italy.
