= Makurdi =

Capital city of Benue State, Nigeria

- LGA and State Capital
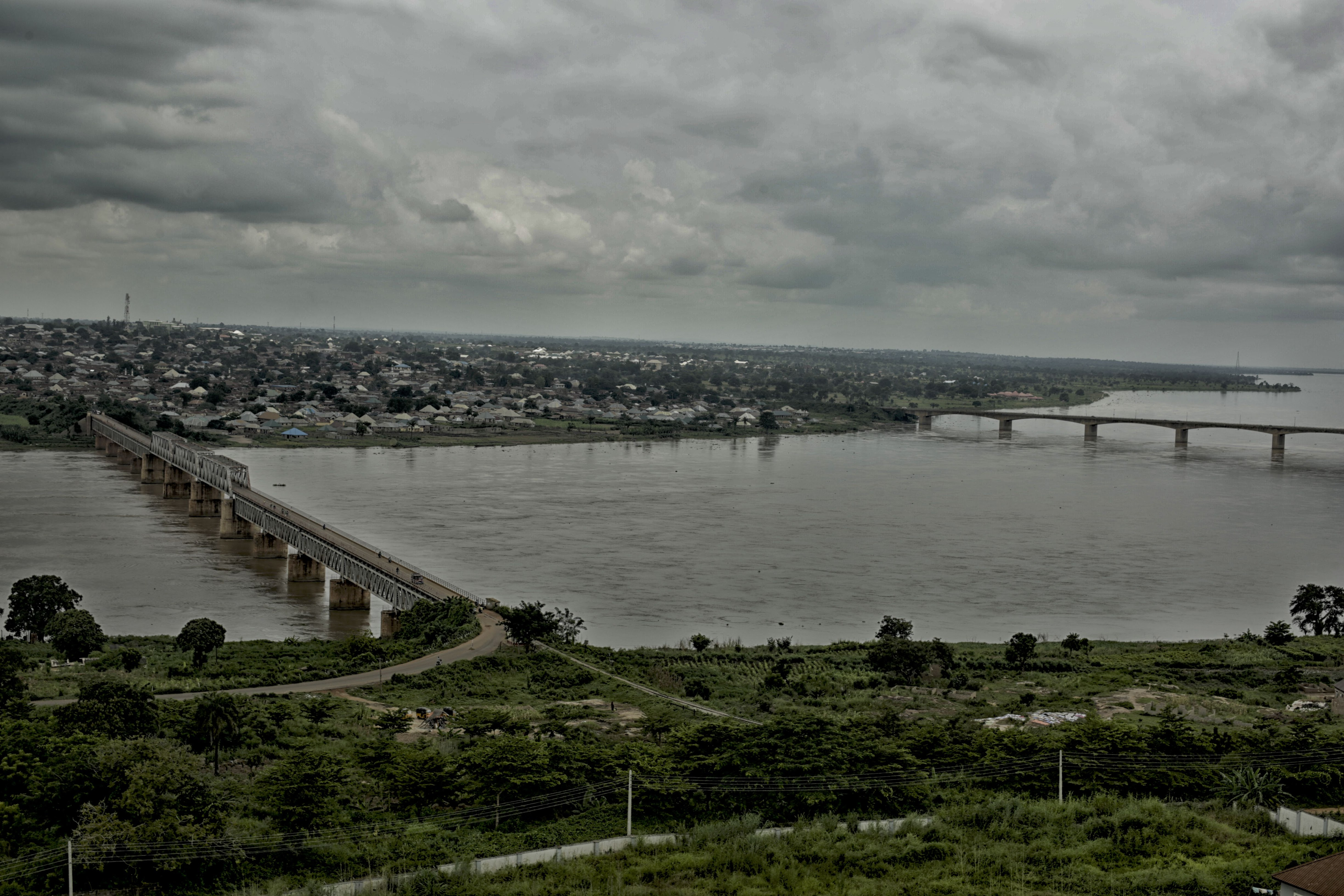
- River Benue (in Makurdi with both bridges)
- Nicknames: Mkd, Mak-town
- Interactive map of Makurdi
- Location in Nigeria
- Coordinates: 7°44′N 8°30′E
- Country: Nigeria
- State: Benue State

Area
  - Total: 937.4 km^{2} (361.9 sq mi)

Population (2022)
  - Total: 517,342
  - Density: 551.9/km^{2} (1,429/sq mi)
- Time zone: UTC+1 (WAT)

Makurdi is the capital of Benue State, located in central Nigeria, and part of the Middle Belt region of central Nigeria. The city is situated along the Benue River. In 2017, Makurdi's urban population was 517,342.

The town is divided by the River Benue into the north and south banks, which are connected by two bridges: the railway bridge, which was built in 1932, and the new dual carriage bridge commissioned in 1978.

The southern part of the town is made up of several neighborhoods or wards; the Central Ward, Old GRA, Ankpa Ward, Wadata, High Level, Wurukum (Low Level), New GRA, Nyiman layout, Achusa, etc. Important establishments and offices located here include the Government House, The State Secretariat, The Federal Secretariat, The Central Bank of Nigeria Regional headquarters, Commercial Banks, Telecommunication companies, Police Headquarters, Nigeria Prisons Service, Aper Aku Stadium, Nigeria Air Force Base, Makurdi, The Makurdi Modern Market, the Federal Medical Centre, Nigeria Railway Station, Benue Printing and Publishing Company Limited, Radio Benue, Nigerian Television Authority (NTA), Nigerian Postal Service, Benue Hotels Makurdi, Benue Plaza Hotel, Benue State University, Benue State Breweries, etc.

The North bank area of the town houses among other establishments, the Federal University of Agriculture, the Nigerian Army School of Military Engineering, the headquarters of the 72 Airborne Battalion, Akawe Torkula Polytechnic (ATP), and the State Headquarters of the Department of Customs and Excise.

Owing to its location in the valley of River Benue, Makurdi experiences warm temperatures most of the year. The period from November to January, when the harmattan weather is experienced is, however, relatively cool.

Makurdi can be reached by air, rail, road, and water. By road, the major northern route is the Makurdi – Lafia – Jos road. The southern routes are Makurdi – Otukpo – Enugu and Makurdi – Yandev – Adikpo – Calabar roads. Traffic from the west comes through Makurdi – Naka – Adoka - Ankpa – Okene roads and from the east through Makurdi – Yandev – Katsina Ala – Wukari roads.

== History ==
Makurdi, a town founded in the early 1920s, rose to prominence in 1927 when it became the headquarters of the Benue Province. As a river port, it drew the establishment of trading depots by companies like United Africa Company of Nigeria(UAC) and John Holt plc. Its commercial significance grew even more with the completion and opening of the Railway bridge in 1932.

In the late 19th and early 20th centuries, many Tiv people from nearby communities and towns moved to Makurdi, contributing to its distinct Tiv urban identity. This migration also fostered a growing sense of political awareness among the Tiv. Makurdi emerged as a developing colonial town situated along the River Benue, within Tiv territory.

In 1914, Audu Dan Afoda, a Nupe and Hausa-speaking Muslim who had worked as an interpreter and political agent for various British District officers, was appointed the Sarkin Makurdi (Chief of Makurdi). This decision to place a Hausa speaking Nupe in charge of the Tiv people in the Makurdi area highlighted the British commitment to using Hausa as a key principle of Indirect Rule in the Middle Belt. It supports Mahdi Adamu's claim that the Hausa ethnic unit…is an assimilating ethnic entity and the Hausa language a colonizing one.

More hausa speaking railway workers migrated into the small Makurdi village and it gradually transformed having Wadata area, a predominant hausa speaking section of Makurdi as the most developed part of the town.

Between 1914 and 1926, the British government worked to bring the surrounding Tiv districts under the leadership of Dan Afoda. In 1924, they approved the appointment of his hausa messenger, Garuba, as the Village Head of the important Tiv border town of Taraku.

By placing Dan Afoda in the top position of ruler of the Tiv, the British aimed to teach the Tiv about centralized emirate-style leadership. In 1926, D.F.H. Macbride, the Resident of Benue Province, emphasized the importance of this sub-colonial guidance, noting that Audu Dan Afoda's chieftaincy was still useful, as the expectation that it would exert an educational influence on the Tiv is being fulfilled.

In 1937, as calls grew for the appointment of a “chief of Tiv,” the Resident at the time expressed a similar educational perspective regarding Dan Afoda's role as a symbol and tool of political guidance. He felt that Dan Afoda's mission to politically educate the Tiv was still incomplete, noting that Central Administration was yet at its infancy in Tivland. However, he also believed that gradually, as higher education progresses alongside a growing sense of nationality, a true central administration may emerge as part of the journey toward political centralization. Following this, Dan Afoda gained further prominence by leading Tiv delegations to the regular meetings of northern Nigerian chiefs in Kaduna, the regional colonial center.

Unfortunately for the British, Audu Dan Afoda died in 1945, igniting a wave of demands from the Tiv for a Tiv successor to take his place as the supreme chief.

The British's initial attempt to appoint a relative of the deceased chief, another hausa along with the Tiv's perception that the hausa wielded excessive influence in colonial Tivland, led to street riots in Makurdi in 1946. These riots quickly escalated into violent confrontations between the Hausa and Tiv communities in Makurdi, marking a tragic peak in a prolonged period of tension among the Tiv.

The British intervened to quell the Makurdi clashes, effectively suppressing the emerging Tiv uprising. Following this, they chose not to appoint a successor to Dan Afoda and opted to distance themselves from the Hausa system of centralized leadership in Tivland to promote peace.

=== 1946 riots ===
Lawrence Igyuse Doki and several Tiv World War II veterans, including Aemberga Samu, Tsenzughul Tyungu, Ishi Wayo, and Gbir Agera, initiated their campaign from Comilla, Bangladesh (formerly part of India). They sent a letter to D.F.H. Macbride, the acting resident of Benue Province, asking him to appoint a Tor Tiv. However, Macbride rejected the request, citing it as contrary to the British colonial policy.

Upon returning from the war, Doki, Makir Zakpe and their fellow soldiers resolved to protest against what they viewed as the imposition of the Hausa caliphate by the British. Ochonu suggests that before the riots, the Tiv effectively kept the Hausa-Fulani Caliphate agents at bay by closely monitoring their activities along the borders of Tivland, attacking their isolated outposts and trade caravans, engaging with them strategically, and establishing a formidable military presence based on the notorious Tiv poisoned arrow.

According to Makar, the Tiv, Resented the Hausa influence in Makurdi Town although they did not object to their presence. The Tiv resented the Hausa control of the courts, political power and landed property…scarcely could the Tiv secure plots of land or find accommodation in Makurdi when they were in transit.

In 1945, the sudden death of Audu Dan Afoda, the Sarkin Makurdi, prompted the British to hastily attempt to crown his son as his successor. This action led to the Makurdi riots of 1946, which were spearheaded by Lawrence Igyuse Doki. To restore order, the governor of Nigeria, Sir Arthur Richards had to reconsider the Tiv veterans' demand for a king. The unrest ultimately disrupted the planned dynastic rule of Audu Dan Afoda in Makurdi, resulting in the election of a new Tor Tiv in person of Makir Zakpe who was also in league with Doki.

The enthronement of a Tiv chief did not lead to further conflicts or divisions between the Tiv and the Hausa, nor was there any animosity; the two groups continued to live together peacefully. Every resident, whether Tiv or Hausa, enjoyed the fundamental rights of citizenship.

The rise of Alhaji Al-Hassan Maikeke as the chairman of Makurdi Local Government Council in 1998 was a reflection of the strong relationship between the two tribes. A pivotal moment in the city's modern history occurred in 1976, when the Nigerian government created Benue State. Makurdi was officially designated as the state capital, resulting in significant administrative and demographic growth.

== Demographics ==
The major ethnic groups are the Tiv, Idoma, Hausa, Igede, Jukun, Agatu, Etulo, Alago, Igbo.

== Education ==
Makurdi is home to Benue State University; University of Agriculture, Makurdi; Nigeria Army School Of Military Engineering, Makurdi; and Akawe Torkula Polytechnic, ATP, Makurdi.

There are secondary schools located in Makurdi including Government Secondary School, North-Bank, Special Science Senior Secondary School, Tilley Gyado College, North-Bank, Mount Saint Gabriel Secondary School, Government College, and Government Girls' Secondary School.

== Climate ==
Climate data for Makurdi (1991–2020)
Month	Jan	Feb	Mar	Apr	May	Jun	Jul	Aug	Sep	Oct	Nov	Dec	Year
Record high °C (°F)	40.0 (104.0)	42.0 (107.6)	41.3 (106.3)	41.0 (105.8)	39.0 (102.2)	36.0 (96.8)	36.4 (97.5)	34.4 (93.9)	34.0 (93.2)	35.0 (95.0)	37.0 (98.6)	38.0 (100.4)	42.0 (107.6)
Mean daily maximum °C (°F)	35.1 (95.2)	37.1 (98.8)	37.6 (99.7)	35.7 (96.3)	33.3 (91.9)	31.4 (88.5)	30.6 (87.1)	30.1 (86.2)	30.7 (87.3)	31.9 (89.4)	34.0 (93.2)	34.8 (94.6)	33.5 (92.3)
Daily mean °C (°F)	26.9 (80.4)	29.8 (85.6)	31.5 (88.7)	30.4 (86.7)	28.6 (83.5)	27.3 (81.1)	26.8 (80.2)	26.5 (79.7)	26.7 (80.1)	27.3 (81.1)	27.6 (81.7)	25.9 (78.6)	27.9 (82.2)
Mean daily minimum °C (°F)	18.7 (65.7)	22.4 (72.3)	25.4 (77.7)	25.0 (77.0)	23.9 (75.0)	23.1 (73.6)	23.0 (73.4)	22.9 (73.2)	22.7 (72.9)	22.8 (73.0)	21.1 (70.0)	17.1 (62.8)	22.4 (72.3)
Record low °C (°F)	9.8 (49.6)	10.0 (50.0)	15.5 (59.9)	17.5 (63.5)	16.6 (61.9)	17.5 (63.5)	18.5 (65.3)	18.4 (65.1)	18.5 (65.3)	18.0 (64.4)	12.8 (55.0)	8.5 (47.3)	8.5 (47.3)
Average precipitation mm (inches)	3.0 (0.12)	8.2 (0.32)	12.0 (0.47)	88.6 (3.49)	140.3 (5.52)	192.8 (7.59)	166.5 (6.56)	235.0 (9.25)	226.2 (8.91)	133.4 (5.25)	8.6 (0.34)	0.5 (0.02)	1,217.1 (47.92)
Average precipitation days (≥ 1.0 mm)	0.3	0.4	1.0	4.9	8.2	9.9	11.0	13.3	13.1	9.3	0.7	0.1	72.2
Average relative humidity (%)	56.8	59.4	71.6	79.0	83.5	85.9	87.2	87.8	88.0	87.0	76.2	62.8	77.1
Mean monthly sunshine hours	217.0	212.8	210.8	210.0	213.9	183.0	151.9	145.7	162.0	201.5	240.0	232.5	2,381.1
Mean daily sunshine hours	7.0	7.6	6.8	7.0	6.9	6.1	4.9	4.7	5.4	6.5	8.0	7.5	6.5
Source 1: NOAA (sun 1961-1990)
Source 2: Deutscher Wetterdienst (extremes)

== Transport ==
Makurdi is located on the banks of Benue River, a major tributary of the Niger River. It can be reached by air, rail, road and water.

=== Railway system ===
It is on the main narrow gauge railway line running north from Port Harcourt.

Until a road rail bridge was built in 1932, a train ferry was used to cross the Benue river.

=== By Road ===
By road, the major Northern route is the Makurdi – Lafia – Jos road. The southern routes are Makurdi – Otukpo – Enugu and Makurdi – Yandev – Adikpo – Calabar roads.

Traffic from the western and Eastern parts of the country come through Makurdi – Naka Benue Nigeria – Adoka - Ankpa – Okene roads

Traffic from the South-south and parts of South East come through Makurdi – Yandev – Katsina Ala – Wukari roads.

There are regular commercial transport company linking Makurdi to the neighboring towns like; Benue links, Pleasure travels and flight travel company.

Bus companies include Victoria bus company, Zaamo transport company, and Valgee Transport company.

=== By Air ===
There is the airport in Makurdi at the airforce base. It handles national flights. The only airline for now is Air Peace

== Military ==
Makurdi contains the base for the; Nigerian Air Force's JF-17 Thunder, MiG 21 and SEPECAT Jaguar aircraft squadrons

The Nigerian army 72nd Special Forces Battalion

The Nigerian Navy has presence in Makurdi and a hospital for the public

== Economy ==
Makurdi serves as a commercial hub for the Middle Belt region. The local economy is largely driven by trade and agriculture, with the Makurdi Modern Market acting as a key distribution point for regional produce such as yams and cassava.

== Agriculture ==
Major agricultural companies are;
Oracle farms and feed mills
MIVA rice
Pure Biotech company limited

Benue State is predominantly an agricultural area specialising in cash crops and subsistence crops.

== Mineral Resources ==
Limestone
laterite
baryte
sharp sand. While these mineral deposits are present in the broader Benue State region, large-scale commercial mining within the immediate Makurdi area remains underdeveloped, with extraction primarily conducted at an artisanal level.

== Notable people ==
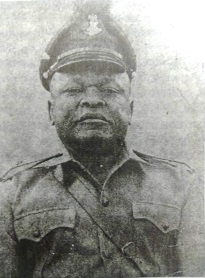
Doki, the emancipator of Makurdi

- Lawrence Igyuse Doki ---- WW2 veteran and emancipator of Makurdi.
- Hyacinth Alia ----- Benue state governor
- George Akume ---- former state governor and the SGF of Nigeria.
- James Nnaji ---- NBA player.
- Jeff Varem --- NBA G League player.
- Gabriel Suswam --- former governor of Benue state
- Samuel Ortom ---- former governor of Benue state
- Aper Aku ---- former governor of Benue state
- Prof. Terhemba Shija --- politician and teacher
- Michael Aondoakaa --- Former Attorney general of Nigeria
- Moses Adasu ---- former governor of Benue state
- Gideon Orkar ---- Nigerian military officer

== Pioneers ==
- Abokis Dry Cleaner Ind. Ltd., Est. in 1977, Incorporated in 1985.

== See also ==
- Federal Medical Centre, Makurdi
