= Tor Tiv =

Traditional ruler of Tiv people of Nigeria

Tor Tiv also known as Begha U Tiv (Lion of Tiv people) is the supreme traditional ruler / King / Monarch of the Tiv people. The stool was established in 1946 by the British colonial administration after they created the Tiv Central Council. Tor Tiv is the symbol of unity of the Tiv people. The seat is located in Gboko. The Tor Tiv is the head of Ijirtamen also known as the Tiv Traditional Council (TTC), the highest policy-making body in charge of the Tiv people. It comprises all the chiefs in Tiv land. The council sits at least once in a year. The Tor Tiv, according to Tiv tradition, arbitrates disputes among Tiv people with impartiality, irrespective of economic, political and social status of the parties to a dispute.

According to Section 16 (1) schedule 3 of the law establishing the Benue State Council of Chiefs and Traditional Council, the Tor Tiv seat rotates among the two sons of Tiv, Ipusu and Ichongo, as the main ruling houses of the Tiv people. The Tor Tiv is also the chairman of the Benue State Council of Chiefs and Traditional Council.

The current Tor Tiv is James Ayatse. The full title of the Tor Tiv is, His Royal Majesty, Begha U Tiv, Orchivirigh, Prof Ortese Iorzua James Ayatse.

== Origin of the Tor Tiv Stool ==
The Tor Tiv institution emerged to satisfy the needs of the colonial administration and the yearnings of the Tiv people. The British were finding it difficult to administer the Tiv area which was as large as the Northern Emirates and had at different times placed Tiv land under different authorities outside Tiv land. Earlier attempts led to the creation of the Tiv Division, the establishment of a Tiv Central Council (Ijir Tamen) and Gboko as the headquarters of Tiv Division.

The Tiv on the other hand yearned for an institution of such because without it they had no effective representation in the colonial administration. This was made worse when Abinsi was made headquarters of the Tiv Council and a non-Tiv, Audu Dan Afoda, the chief of Makurdi was made head of it in 1927. This was resented by the few educated Tiv and chiefs.

After World War II, the agitations became pronounced with the return of Tiv soldiers like Makir Zakpe and Lawrence Igyuse Doki who served in the war. These young men in cooperation with the educated Tiv officials in the colonial service called for the creation of the Tor Tiv institution.

The British for these reasons created the Tor Tiv institution in 1946.

=== Early role of the Tor Tiv ===
The Tor Tiv was subject to the control of colonial officials. He however assumed executive and judicial functions over Tiv land. He took charge of the collection of poll tax and the dissemination of information. He also presided over the Tiv Central Council (Ijir Tamen) in which capacity he acted as the Chief Judge of the division in customary as well as criminal cases.

== List of Tor Tiv ==
- Makir Zakpe, Tor Tiv I (19 September 1946 to 11 October 1956)
- Gondo Aluor, Tor Tiv II (12 December 1956 to 19 November 1978)
- James Akperan Orshi, OON, Tor Tiv III (10 March 1979 to 16 October 1990)
- Alfred Akawe Torkula, MFR, Tor Tiv IV (21 April 1991 – 22 November 2015)
- James Ayatse, Tor Tiv V (4 March 2017 – present)

== Sacrilege of the Tor Tiv Stool ==
On 4 March 2017, during the coronation of James Ayatse as Tor Tiv V at JS Tarka Stadium in Gboko, a man, Stephen Nyitse outwitted the security officers and sat on the stool prepared for the coronation. Nyitse during interrogation said he sat on the stool to cleanse it for the incoming Tor Tiv and make it comfortable for him. The sacrilegist was later banished from Tivland by the Tiv Traditional Council (TTC) with instructions that no Tiv son or daughter must ever relate with him or help him. Stephen Nyitse was also sentenced to four years in prison after being found guilty of trespass and impersonating the Tor Tiv on 7 March 2017 by a magistrate court. Later, Tor Tiv V, James Ayatse applied for his pardon.
