= Gboko =

LGA in Benue State, Nigeria

- City and local government area
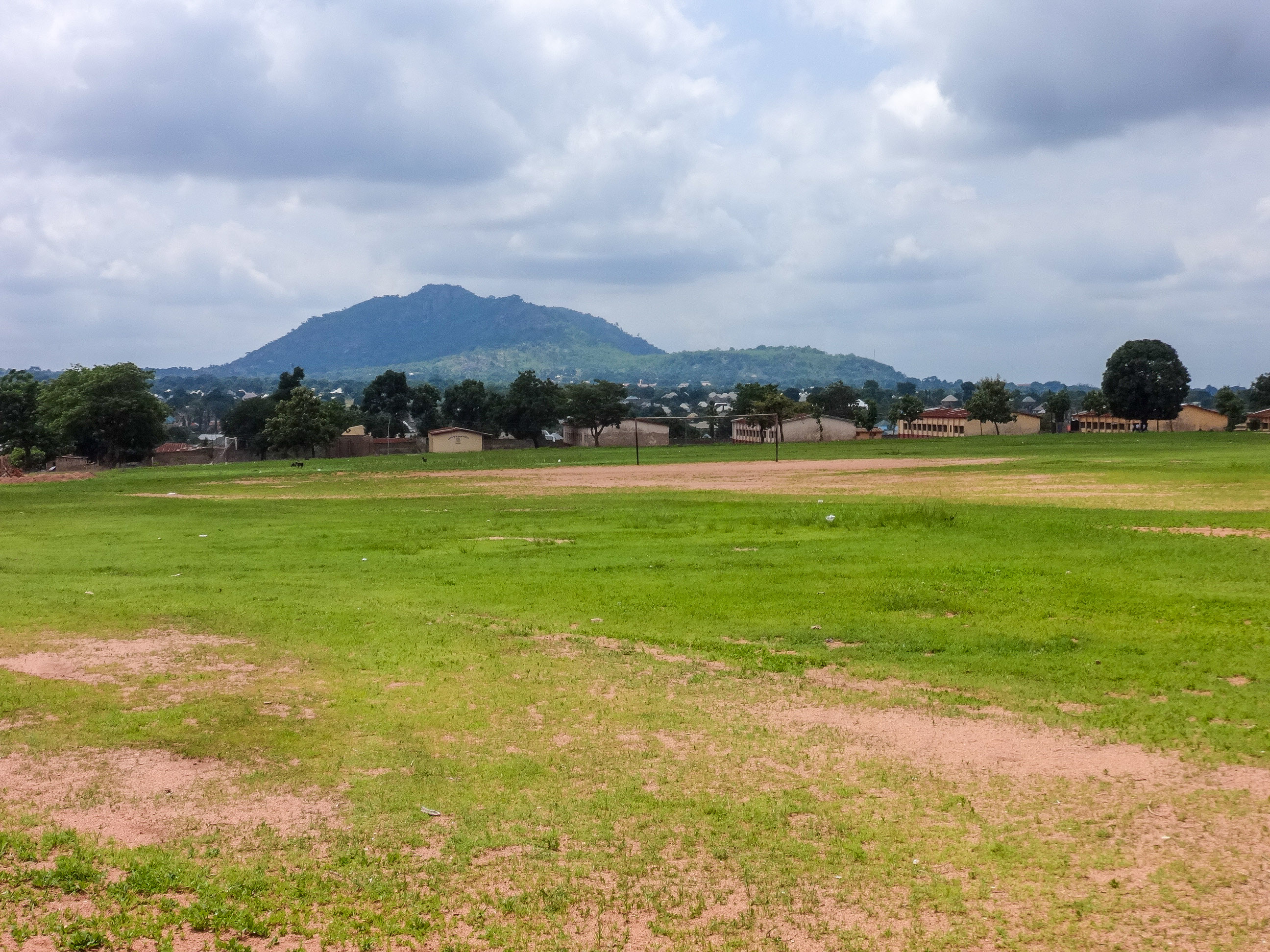
- Mkar Hill
- Interactive map of Gboko
- Location in Nigeria
- Coordinates: 7°19′30″N 9°0′18″E
- Country: Nigeria
- State: Benue State

Government
  - Local Government Council Chairman: James Kachina

Area
  - Total: 2,264 km^{2} (874 sq mi)
- Elevation: 0 m (0 ft)

Population
  - Total: 358,936
  - Density: 158.5/km^{2} (410.6/sq mi)
- Time zone: UTC+1 (WAT)

Gboko is a city and local government area in Benue state, North-central Nigeria.

Gboko LGA was created on 11 May 1970 with a landmass of 2,264 square kilometres (874 mi^{2}). Wielding a population of 358,936 according to 2006 census, it is the largest of the twenty-three local governments by population in Benue State.

Tiv, Hausa, and English are the languages most widely spoken in Gboko.

The city of Gboko also doubles as the ancestral headquarters of the Tiv people. The palace of the Tor Tiv, who is the supreme traditional leader, is situated right in the heart of the town. The current Tor Tiv honorifically called Begha U Tiv (Lion of Tiv people) is His Royal Majesty, Begha U Tiv, Orchivirigh, Prof Ortese Iorzua James Ayatse.

Gboko is also host to former Benue Cement Company now Dangote Cement, and also home to the defunct BCC Lions Football Club, who were the 1990 winners of the African Cup Winners' Cup. They played host at the J.S Tarkar Stadium in the Gboko township.

== Economy ==
Mineral reserves including limestone, granite, barite, and alluvial clay are abundant in the Gboko LGA. The majority of Gboko LGA residents work in agriculture, and the region is well-known for cultivating crops like rice, yams, maize, and cassava in significant quantities. Several marketplaces, including the Ortese, Ikpa, and Tarukpe markets, where locals can buy and sell a wide range of goods, are located in the Gboko LGA, where trade is also thriving.

== Geography ==
Gboko is located in the Savannah region and has a total area of 2,264 square kilometres (874 square miles). The dry and wet seasons are the two main ones that the city experiences. The local average temperature is 28 degrees Celsius (82 degrees Fahrenheit), and the local average relative humidity is 49 percent.

Gboko has a tropical wet and dry or savanna climate (Classification: Aw) and is zero metres (0 feet) above sea level. The district has an average annual temperature of 29.69 °C (85.44 °F), which is 0.23% higher than Nigeria's national average. 136.61 millimetres (5.38 inches) of precipitation and 161.68 wet days (44.3% of the time) are typical annual totals for Gboko.

In Gboko, the dry season is hot, muggy, and partly cloudy whereas the wet season is warm, oppressive, and cloudy. The temperature rarely falls below 56 °F or rises over 94 °F throughout the year, often fluctuating between 62 °F and 90 °F.

With an average daily high temperature of 88 °F, the hot season lasts for 2.3 months, from February 5 to April 16. With an average high of 88 °F and low of 74 °F, April is the hottest month of the year in Gboko.

With an average daily maximum temperature below 83 °F, the chilly season lasts for 3.9 months, from June 23 to October 21. In Gboko, December is the coldest month of the year, with average lows of 64 °F and highs of 84 °F.

== Towns and Villages under Gboko Local Governments Area ==
Sources:

- Abia
- Achin
- Aernan
- Agana Num
- Agbel
- Akkarra
- Amua
- Anagonumogba
- Chia
- Foyum
- Gboko
- Gboko East
- Gboko North West
- Gboko South
- Igyorov
- Mbaa Varakaa
- Mbaanku
- Mbadam
- Mbadim
- Mbakper
- Mbakwen
- Mbasere
- Mbatan
- Mbatser
- Mbatyu
- Mpangu
- Pika
- Ukpekpe
- Yandev
- Yandev North
- Yandev South

== Health ==
- TBT Hospital Gboko
- General Hospital, Gboko
- Penuel Orthopaedic Hospital, Gboko.
- Baki Clinic and Maternity, Gboko
