= Herder–farmer conflicts in Nigeria =

Land resource disputes in across Nigeria

Herder–farmer conflicts
- Part of Communal conflicts in Nigeria
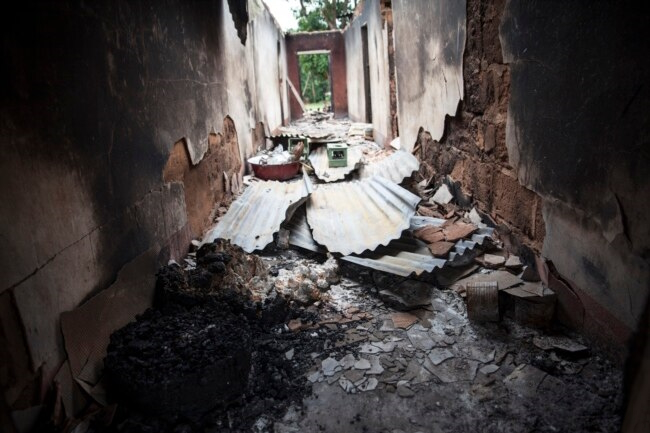
- A house that was burned down in a suspected herdsman attack in Nimbo, May 2016
Date	1998–present
Location	Middle Belt, Nigeria
Status	Ongoing

Belligerents
Christian Farmers Adara, Berom, Jukun, Tiv and Tarok farmers	Muslim Herders Fulani herders and Hausa herders

Casualties and losses
4,877–28,551 civilians killed	10,519 civilians killed

Across Nigeria, there are a series of disputes over arable land between Fulani herders and non-Fulani farmers. The conflicts have been especially prominent in the Middle Belt (North Central) since the return of democracy in 1999. More recently, they have deteriorated into attacks on farmers by Fulani herders.

Attacks have also taken place in Northwestern Nigeria against farmers who are mainly Hausa, who are almost entirely Muslim. Many Fulani communities, who are usually farmers, have also been attacked and raided by Fulani bandits and other militias. The conflict has taken on religious and ethnic dimensions: many of the farmers are Christians of various ethnicities while most of the herders are Muslim Fulani. Thousands of people have died since the attacks began. Sedentary farming in rural communities are often targets of attacks because of their vulnerability. There are fears that the conflict will spread to other West African countries, but that has often been downplayed by governments in the region. Attacks on herders have also led them to retaliating by attacking other communities.

== Background ==
Herder–farmer conflicts in Nigeria have deep roots and date back to pre-colonial times (before the 1900s). However, these conflicts have become far more severe in recent decades due to population pressures, climate change, and various other factors. During the British colonial era, herders and farmers would agree on a system called burti, in which specific migration routes were set up for herders, with mutual agreement from the farmers, herders, and local authorities. However, the burti system collapsed around the 1970s when farmers increasingly claimed ownership of lands along cattle migration paths, increasingly leading to conflicts.

Before, herders frequently exchanged milk for cereal grains with farming communities. However, in recent decades, milk is no longer being widely bartered as packaged beverages became more popular in towns.

Modern medicines have also made it possible for herders to move their livestock further south into the "tsetse fly zone" in the south, whereas before, herders could not keep their cattle on a large scale due to tropical diseases in humid climate zones. Starting from those implemented by the British colonial administration, tsetse control programs have reduced the threat of diseases such as trypanosomiasis. Today, herders also have easy access to drugs for trypanosomiasis and dermatophilosis in order to keep their livestock alive. In addition, over the past several decades, herders have cross-bred trypanosome-intolerant zebu cattle with trypanosome-tolerant humpless breeds, thereby increasing the cattle's tolerance of tropical diseases. All of these factors have enabled the widespread migration of Fulani herders into the southernmost areas of Nigeria, where they could easily sell their livestock for higher prices due to strong demand for beef and other meat products in Nigeria's populous southern towns and cities. However, in the south, they would encounter sedentary communities that have not historically had any experience with peacefully negotiating and co-existing with nomadic herders. Increasing ease of access to weapons and religious polarisation among both Christians and Muslims have added to the potential for violence.

Since the Fourth Nigerian Republic's founding in 1999, farmer–herder violence has killed more than 19,000–28,551 people and displaced hundreds of thousands more,most of them are Christian. It followed a trend in the increase of farmer–herder conflicts throughout much of the western Sahel, due to an expansion of agriculturist population and cultivated land at the expense of pasturelands; deteriorating environmental conditions, desertification and soil degradation; population growth; breakdown in traditional conflict resolution mechanisms of land and water disputes; and proliferation of small arms and crime in rural areas. Insecurity and violence have led many populations to create self-defence forces and ethnic and tribal militias, which have engaged in further violence. The majority of farmer–herder clashes have occurred between Muslim Fulani herdsmen and farmers, exacerbating hostilities.

=== Ethnic groups ===
There are various pastoralist tribes in northern Nigeria that include not only Fulani people, but also Kanuri, Kanembu, Arab, and other groups. Blench (2010) lists the following pastoralist tribes in northern Nigeria.

Tribe	Ethnic group	Location	Primary livestock
Baggara	Arab	south of Geidam	cattle
Shuwa	Arab	eastern Borno/Cameroon	cattle
Uled Suliman	Arab	Komadugu Yobe valley	camels
Anagamba	Fulɓe	north-eastern Borno	cattle
Bokolooji	Fulɓe	northern Borno	cattle
Maare	Fulɓe	south-eastern Borno	cattle
Sankara	Fulɓe	north-western Borno	cattle
Uda'en	Fulɓe	north-eastern Nigeria	uda sheep
Woɗaaɓe	Fulɓe	north-eastern Nigeria	cattle
Badawai	Kanuri	central Borno	cattle
Jetko	Kanuri	north of Geidam/Niger	camels
Kanuri	Kanuri	Borno	cattle
Koyam	Kanuri	south-central Borno	cattle
Manga	Kanuri	north-west Borno	cattle/camels
Mober	Kanuri	north-eastern Borno/Niger	cattle
Kuburi	Kanembu	extreme north-east Borno/Niger	cattle
Sugurti	Kanembu	Lake Chad shore	cattle
Teda (Tubu)	Teda (Tubu)	northern Borno/Niger	camels
Tuareg	Tuareg	north of Sokoto/Niger	camels
Yedina (Buduma)	Yedina (Buduma)	Lake Chad shore	cattle

Fulani herdsmen are represented by advocacy groups such as Miyetti Allah.

Farmers belong to diverse ethnic groups, primarily Hausa people and the diverse ethnic groups of the Middle Belt. In more recent years, this has also expanded to include southern Nigerian ethnic groups such as the Yoruba, Igbo, and others. Farmers belonging to various minority ethnic groups in the Middle Belt are represented by partisan advocacy groups such as CONAECDA.

=== Regional conflicts in Jos and Kaduna ===
The farmer/herder conflicts have been taking place in regions which have been unstable since the 2000s. Urban conflicts in Jos and Kaduna have been particularly violent and, despite violent clashes with the authorities, their causes have never been addressed politically. Conflicts might not have been addressed adequately because traditional authorities have not been fulfilling their role in colonial-era settlements.

Over time the periodic clashes between herders and farmers in Northern and North-Central Nigeria have precipitated a general climate of insecurity. This widespread insecurity both allows for and is perpetuated by acts of broader criminality, in which gangs of bandits target locations in the area for raids, mass kidnappings, and looting.

== Causes of the conflict ==
=== Land conflicts ===
Conflicts between farmers and herders can be understood as a problem of access to land. The beginning of the 21st century witnessed an expansion of the agriculturist population and its cultivated land at the expense of pasturelands in the Middle Belt. In an already politically unstable region, it has never been possible to ascertain a legal title to land for every farmer. As a result, transhumance routes of herders were no longer available, especially in a context of global warming.

=== Climate change ===
Deteriorating environmental conditions, desertification and soil degradation have led Fulani herdsmen from Northern Nigeria to change their transhumance routes. Access to pastureland and watering points in the Middle Belt became essential for herdsmen travelling from the North of the country. It is often assumed that climate change is the driver of the conflict but a recent study suggests that climate change does not automatically cause the conflict. In actuality, regions vulnerable to climate change (Northern Regions) experience less farmer-herder conflict and less intense farmer-herder fighting. It is argued that ethnic conflict between farming and herding groups is the primary mechanism behind the farmer-herder conflict nexus.

== Responses ==
The Nigerian government has been unwilling to address the causes of the crisis. Fighting Boko Haram in the North-East and facing rising levels of violence in different regions of the country, the government has nonetheless tried to implement a few measures, like in creating the Agro Rangers, a force of 10,000 deployed across all states and the Federal Capital Territory to prevent attacks, though its efficacy has been questioned.

Due to the widely perceived inefficacy of the Nigerian government, armed vigilante groups have sprung up in many farmer communities. This situation would often lead to vicious cycles of bloody feuds among farmers and herders. Local politicians and religious leaders have also exacerbated conflicts by recruiting members and frequently exaggerating claims.

Since 2012, there have been projects to create transhumance corridors through the Middle Belt. Mostly supported by Northern lawmakers and opposed by their Southern counterparts, these endeavours have been rarely successful.

In 2019, President Muhammadu Buhari tried to create Rural Grazing Area (RUGA) settlements. His proposal was met with fierce criticism. On 17 May 2021, the 17 Southern governors in Nigeria issued the Asaba Declaration, aimed at solving the crisis.

Although ranching, where cattle are kept in enclosed parcels of land, has frequently been proposed as a solution to the crisis, this has proven to be highly unfeasible in Nigeria due to poor infrastructure (with unstable supplies of electricity, water, and fuel) and difficulties with acquisition and legal ownership of land. Land grabbing and cattle rustling are also potential difficulties that ranchers would have to deal with. Ranchers would also be unable to compete with nomadic herders with zero land-related costs.

Since 2022, Genocide Watch has classified the conflicts as a genocide of Christians perpetrated by ethnic Fulani jihadists. The organisation places Nigeria on the stages "Stage 9: Extermination" and "Stage 10: Denial" in the Ten Stages of Genocide model developed by American scholar Gregory Stanton. In 2025, the American president Donald Trump said he would consider military intervention in the form of American troops or airstrikes if Nigeria could not control the situation, saying "they're killing record numbers of Christians in Nigeria". Daniel Bwala, an adviser to the Nigerian president Bola Tinubu, denied accusations of a Christian genocide, as has the Economic Community of West African States. The New York Times says that attacks on Christians have received the most attention within Nigeria and internationally. Analysts speaking to Reuters note that the majority of attacks from Islamist insurgents were against Muslims. Nigerian officials also said they welcomed assistance on dealing with the insurgency, but insisted Nigeria's territorial integrity must be maintained.

== List of attacks ==
Nigerian and foreign newspapers are often unable to provide exact numbers of casualties. Despite the high number of attacks, Nigerian and foreign journalists rarely have access to first-hand testimonies and tend to report inaccurate figures.

- According to the Global Terrorism Index, these conflicts resulted in over 800 deaths by 2015.
- The year 2016 saw further incidents in Agatu, Benue and Nimbo, Enugu State.
- In April 2018, Fulani gunmen allegedly killed 19 people during an attack on the church, afterwards they burnt dozens of nearby homes.
- In January 2018, about 10 persons were killed in an attack and reprisal involving herders and local farmers in Numan local council of Adamawa State.
- In May 2018 over 400 herdsmen attacked four villages of Lamurde, Bang, Bolk, Zumoso and Gon in Numan and Lamurde local councils of Adamawa State killing 15 people.
- In June 2018, over 200 people were killed and 50 houses were burnt in clashes between farmers and Fulani cattle herders in Plateau State, including one devastating attack from the night of the 22nd to the morning of the 23rd which killed 21 villagers in the village of Dowaya, Adamawa state. The casualties were reported to only consist of women and children.
- In July 2018, a clash erupted between the Fulani settlers and the Yandang community in Lau Local Government Area of Taraba State. About 73 people were killed and 50 villages were razed.
- In October 2018, Fulani herdsmen killed at least 19 people in Bassa.
- On 16 December 2018, militants believed to be Fulani herdsmen attacked a village in Jema'a, killing 15 people and injuring at least 24 others, the attack occurred at a wedding ceremony.
- On 11 February 2019, an attack on an Adara settlement named Ungwar Bardi by suspected Fulani gunmen killed 11. Reprisal attack by Adara targeted settlements of the Fulani killing at least 141 people with 65 missing. The attacks took place in Kajuru LGA of Kaduna State. According to a governor the motive was to destroy specific communities.
- The Coalition Against Kajuru killings stated on 18 March 2019 that 130 people have been killed in a series of revenge attacks since the massacre announced by El-Rufai.
- On 26–27 January 2020, 32 villagers were murdered in two different attacks by Muslim Fulani herdsmen in Plateau State.
- On June 7, 2021, at least forty people were killed in an attack on the Odugbeho village, allegedly by Fulani herdsmen.
- On 12 April 2022, 23 were killed in an attack by herdsman against the Mbadwem (Guma local government area) and Tiortyu (Tarka local government area) communities.
- On 7 September 2023, Na’aman Danlami, a Catholic seminarian studying for the Roman Catholic Diocese of Kafanchan, died in a fire set by Fulani militants when their attempted kidnapping of a priest living in the rectory was unsuccessful.
- Attacks on 23–25 December 2023 in Plateau State resulted in at least 200 deaths and injuries to more than 500 people in at least 17 rural communities in Bokkos and Barkin Ladi, attributed to Fulani militias.
- On 23 January 2024, suspected Fulani herders killed at least 30 people and burned and ransacked schools, places of worship, and houses in Kwahaslalek village, Mangu.
- On 7 April 2025, The National Emergency Management Agency (NEMA) reports that at least 52 people have been killed and more than 2,000 others displaced from their homes in Plateau State amid reprisal attacks by rival herders for control of farmland.
- On June 14, 2025, at least 100 people were killed, many burned alive, hundreds more injured, and dozens remain missing, in an attack by unidentified gunmen in Gum, Benue State.

== See also ==
- List of massacres in Nigeria
- Communal conflicts in Nigeria
- Fulani herdsmen
- Sudanese nomadic conflicts
- March 2019 attacks against Fulani herders
- 2019 Kaduna State massacre
- Nimbo massacre
- Agatu massacres
- Janjaweed
- Agricultural sustainability in northern Nigeria
- Nigerian bandit conflict
  - Southern Kaduna crisis
  - Mass killings in Southern Kaduna
- Asaba Declaration
- Fulani extremism
- Fulani extremism in Nigeria

== Bibliography ==
- Adebanwi, Wale, 'Terror, Territoriality and the Struggle for Indigeneity and Citizenship in Northern Nigeria', Citizenship Studies, 13.4 (2009), 349–63
- Amnesty International, Harvest of Death: Three Years of Bloody Clashes between Farmers and Herders in Nigeria, 2018 <Nigeria: The Harvest of Death - Three Years of Bloody Clashes Between Farmers and Herders in Nigeria>
- Bearak, Max, Jane Hahn, Mia Torres, and Olivier Laurent, 'The Ordinary People Keeping the Peace in Nigeria's Farmer-Herder Conflict', The Washington Post, 10 December 2018 <The ordinary people keeping the peace in Nigeria's deadly land feuds> [accessed 25 December 2019]
- Blench, Roger. 1996. Pastoralists and National Borders in Nigeria. In: Nugent, P., and A. I. Asiwaju (eds). African Boundaries: Barriers, conduits and opportunities. 111–128. Edinburgh: Francis Pinter for Centre of African Studies.
- Blench, Roger. 1984. Conflict and co-operation: Fulani relations with the Samba and Mambila peoples. Cambridge Anthropology, 9(2):42-57. (2005 revision)
- Blench, Roger. 1998. Resource conflict in semi-arid Africa: An essay and an annotated bibliography. ODI Research Study. ISBN 0-85003-343-8
- Blench, Roger. 2001. Pastoralism in the new millennium. FAO: Animal Health and Production Series, No 150.
- Blench, Roger. 2003. The transformation of conflict between pastoralists. Cambridge: Kay Williamson Education Foundation.
- Blench, Roger. 2003. The transformation of conflict between pastoralists and cultivators in Nigeria. Paper in press for a special issue of the Journal Africa, ed. M. Moritz.
- Blench, Roger. 2004. Natural Resource Conflicts in North-Central Nigeria: A Handbook and Case Studies. London/Abuja: Mandaras Press/DFID. (With integrated CD-ROM.)
- Blench, Roger. 2005. Conflict and Co-operation: Fulɓe Relations with the Mambila and Samba people of Southern Adamawa. Paper in press for a special issue of Africa, ed. M. Moritz. Cambridge: Kay Williamson Education Foundation.
- Blench, Roger. 2010. Conflict between pastoralists and cultivators in Nigeria. Review paper prepared for the Department for International Development (DFID), Nigeria.
- Blench, Roger. 2016. The recent evolution of pastoralism in West-Central Africa. Cambridge: Kay Williamson Education Foundation.
- Blench, Roger. 2016. Accelerating pastoralist/farmer conflict across Central Nigeria (and West Africa) potentially compromises all IITA's goals. Talk given at IITA, Ibadan on 28 November 2016.
- Blench, Roger. 2016. The fire next time: the upsurge in civil insecurity across the Central Zone of Nigeria. Cambridge: Kay Williamson Educational Foundation.
- Blench, Roger. 2017. Pastoral conflict and supplying Nigeria with meat: how can the paradox be resolved. Field investigations on pastoralist-farmers crises areas and enhancement of MISEREOR's partnersinterventions in Nigeria, Phase 3. Revised paper prepared for ISEREOR/JDPs.
- Blench, Roger. 2017. Is fencing a solution to reducing herder-farmer conflict in Nigeria?. Field investigations on pastoralist-farmers crises areas and enhancement of MISEREOR's partnersinterventions in Nigeria, Phase 3. Draft prepared for ISEREOR/JDPs.
- Blench, Roger. 2024. A trophic cascade in Nigerian vegetation and its implications for herder-farmer conflict. Cambridge: Kay Williamson Educational Foundation.
- Blench, Roger. 2025. An agenda for the introduction of an agropastoralist model in Nigeria. Strengthening Peace and Resilience in Nigeria (SPRiNG).
- Dawum, Raymond; Blench, Roger. 2025. The Evolution of Nigerian Farming Systems in Relation to Farmer-Herder Conflict. Strengthening Peace and Resilience in Nigeria (SPRiNG).
- Higazi, Adam, 'Farmer-Pastoralist Conflicts on the Jos Plateau, Central Nigeria: Security Responses of Local Vigilantes and the Nigerian State', Conflict, Security and Development, 16.4 (2016), 365–85
- Last, Murray, 'Muslims and Christians in Nigeria: An Economy of Political Panic', The Round Table : The Commonwealth Journal of International Affairs, 96.392 (2007), 605–16
- Last, Murray, 'The Search for Security in Muslim Northern Nigeria', Africa, 78.1 (2008), 41–63
- Mustapha, Abdul Raufu, and David Ehrhardt, eds., Creed & Grievance: Muslim-Christian Relations & Conflict Resolution in Northern Nigeria (Oxford: James Currey, 2018)
- Ochonu, Moses E, 'Fulani Expansion and Subcolonial Rule in Early Colonial Adamawa Province', in Colonialism by Proxy Hausa Imperial Agents and Middle Belt Consciousness in Nigeria (Bloomington, IN: Indiana University Press, 2014), pp. 129–56
- Porter, Gina; Fergus Lyon; Fatima Adamu; Lanre Obafemi; Roger Blench. 2005. Trade and Markets in Conflict Development and Conflict Resolution in Nigeria. Scoping study report to the UK Department for International Development.
- Reynolds, Jonathan, The Time of Politics: Islam and the Politics of Legitimacy in Northern Nigeria (1950-1966) (San Francisco: International Scholar Publications, 1999)
