= 2023 Plateau State massacres =

Mass murders in Nigeria, 23–25 December 2023

- Part of the Nigerian bandit conflict
- Location: 9°34′N 8°55′E; Bokkos and Barkin Ladi, Plateau State, Nigeria
- Date: 24 December 2023
- Target: 20 rural communities
- Attack type: Coordinated mass shootings, arson
- Weapon: Firearms
- Deaths: ≈200
- Injuries: ≈500
- Victim: Berom civilians
- Perpetrator: Believed to have been Fulani militia
- Motive: Ethnic and religious tensions, land disputes, herder–farmer conflicts
- Inquiry: Amnesty International called for an independent investigation
- Attacks followed previous incidents in October and November 2023

A series of armed attacks occurred between 23 and 25 December 2023 in Plateau State in central Nigeria. They affected at least 17 rural communities in the Nigerian local government areas of Bokkos and Barkin Ladi, resulting in at least 200 deaths and injuries to more than 500 people as well as significant property damage. Although no group claimed responsibility for the attacks, they are believed to have been committed by Fulani militias.

== Background ==
Plateau State is in Nigeria's Middle Belt and has a history of ethnic and religious conflicts, mainly between Muslim Fulani herders and Christian farmers. The bandit conflict began in 2011 as a result of disagreements over land ownership and grazing rights between the herders and farmers. Banditry and insecurity are exacerbated by Nigeria's high fertility rate (5.3 as of 2023), with the large youth population suffering from unemployment and underemployment that makes them susceptible to radicalism and banditry. Climate change and the expansion of agriculture also lead to increased conflict. Previous attacks occurred in the region in April 2022 and May 2023.

Miyetti Allah (MACBAN), an advocacy group for Fulani interests, accused state security personnel of colluding with farmers to attack Fulani herders. Muhammed Nuru Abdullahi, the state chairman of the MACBAN, claimed the violence began with a failed act of "cattle rustling" against Fulani on 23 December, where three cattle breeders were killed and the theft of 181 cows was attempted, and that 130 houses were burned in several Fulani villages on 24 December. He recommended that "in order to end the incessant clashes between farmers and herders, the Federal Government should establish ranches in Plateau State and other states of the Federation for animal husbandry."

== Attacks ==
At least 17 rural communities in the regions of Bokkos and Barkin Ladi were attacked on 23 and 24 December, leaving at least 200 people dead and over 500 wounded. The attackers, who used guns and machetes, burned houses and other property. No group has claimed responsibility for the attacks. Since 2014, attacks on Hausa farmers in the region have been blamed on "semi-nomadic Fulani herders" who have "long complained that farmers are taking over grazing lands crucial to their survival".

== Aftermath ==
The Nigerian Army began "clearance operations" to find suspects in the attacks afterwards. Some victims reported that it took more than twelve hours for the security forces to respond after the attacks.

The attacks prompted outrage, with residents demanding justice and government protection. Governor Caleb Mutfwang condemned the violence. His response faced criticism, and Amnesty International called for an independent investigation. The international community, including the United Nations, African Union, European Union, and the United States, expressed condemnation and offered support.

After the attacks, photos of the 2022 Owo church attack circulated on social media with miscaptioned labels suggesting they were from the massacres in Plateau State.

On 8 January 2024, around 5,000 Nigerian Christians rallied in Jos, the capital of Plateau State, to protest over insecurity. The protesters gathered outside of the office of the local governor of Jos to call for peace. Plateau State governor Caleb Mutfwang restated his vows to bring the perpetrators of the massacres to justice.
