= Umogidi massacre =

- Part of Herder-farmer conflicts in Nigeria
- Location: Umogidi, Otukpo LGA, Benue State, Nigeria
- Date: April 7, 2023
- Target: Funeralgoers
- Deaths: 53+
- Perpetrator: Fulani herdsmen

On April 7, 2023, Fulani herdsmen attacked the remote village of Umogidi, Otukpo LGA, Benue State, Nigeria, killing at least 51 civilians during a funeral. The massacre occurred on the same day as a separate, unrelated massacre in Mgban by Fulani herdsmen.

== Background ==
In Benue State, armed gangs of Fulani herdsmen have been in conflict with sedentary non-Fulani farmers for decades, but it wasn't until the late 2010s that the conflict really militarized. Benue is part of Nigeria's Middle Belt, where Muslim and Christian groups coexist and often clash. Otukpo LGA, where Umogidi is located, has been one of the LGA's in the state under siege by Fulani herdsmen. Between March 3-7, Fulani herdsmen attacked several villages in Kwande LGA of Benue, killing over 50 people. In the weeks leading up to the Umogidi attack, 15 people were killed in Ikobi and several other smaller attacks occurred.

== Massacre ==
At the time of the attack, many residents of Umogidi were attending the funeral of three people who had been killed a day prior. The attackers entered the village on motorbike and shot at the funeralgoers before attacking the town's market. The reason for the attack was unknown, and survivors of the attack said that Umogidi had had no prior problems with Fulani herders. Initial casualty reports said that 46 people were killed, although the discovery of several more bodies increased that toll to 53.

The head of the Miyetti Allah Cattle Breeders' Association urged people to not immediately blame Fulani herders, but stated that he wasn't excluding the possibility of them being responsible. A son of Bala Ejeh, the Otukpo LGA leader, was killed in the attack. Nigerian president Muhammadu Buhari condemned the attack. Benue governor Samuel Ortom visited Umogidi shortly after the massacre.
