= Odugbeho massacre =

- Part of Herder-farmer conflicts in Nigeria
- Location: Odugbeho, Agatu LGA, Benue State, Nigeria
- Date: 7 June 2021; 5:45 pm – 6:40pm
- Deaths: 40+
- Perpetrator: Fulani herdsmen

On 7 June 2021, suspected Fulani herdsmen attacked the village of Odugbeho, Agatu LGA, Benue State, Nigeria, killing at least forty people.

== Background ==
Fulani herdsmen in Nigeria have been in conflict with various farming communities across Nigeria for decades due to disputes over land use. The local government area in Agatu, Benue State is home to various different ethnic groups, and ethnic conflict between Fulani herdsmen and ethnic Agatu locals that broke out in early 2016 led to hundreds of civilians killed. In the conflict, Fulani herdsmen laid siege to several villages in the LGA, including Odugbeho. A second massacre in Nimbo in April 2016 killed hundreds more civilians.

A week before the 2021 massacre in Odugbeho, suspected Fulani herdsmen killed 36 Tiv civilians in the village of Shikaan Mbagena Kpav, also in Benue State. Fulani herdsmen had also stormed several villages in Agatu LGA in the weeks prior to the attack, displacing thousands of people.

== Massacre ==
At the time of the attack, civilians in Odugbeho were at a burial ceremony and others were out at the market due to the village's market day being on Sunday. Later in the afternoon, many people were at home. The herdsmen likely entered the area from Nasarawa State, with one survivor stating that the herdsmen caught the village by surprise by entering from the forest in the direction of Gwer West LGA. The attack began at 5:45 pm, with the herdsmen shooting indiscriminately into the village and the ceremony as soon as they entered. The massacre lasted for an hour until around 6:40 pm, when the herdsmen dispersed back into the forest.

Many civilians fled into the bush towards Ogbaulu to evade the attack. A survivor of the massacre speaking to Channels TV said that while he was fleeing, he saw nine bodies lining the road out of Odugbeho. When he returned to the village after the herdsmen fled, he saw eleven bodies in the village center. Many of the bodies were unable to be recovered the night of the attack in anticipation of a second massacre.

== Aftermath ==
Nigerian senator Abah Moro, who represents Odugbeho's area of Benue in the Nigerian Senate, condemned the attack and stated 40 people were killed. The spokesman for the Benue State police stated that the police had knowledge of the attack and would send reinforcements from Operation Whirl Stroke to the area. The spokesman added that bodies were still being discovered and that the death toll was unknown.

Moro was one of the first officials to report the attack and stated the death toll was 40. John Ngbede, the chairman of the Peoples Democratic Party (PDP) in Benue stated that 25 bodies had been buried by 8 June, and that 30 had been discovered in total including ten bodies in the bush. Ngbede added that local officials had told him they suspected over 40 people were killed, as many bodies were still in the bush undiscovered. The chairman of Agatu stated that 27 people had been confirmed to be killed by 8 June, although the number was not final.

Fulani herdsmen attacked Odugbeho again on 20 June, killing eleven people in a spree of attacks on Odugbeho, Aila, and Adagbo. Two people were killed in Odugbeho and 21 houses were burned.
