= Asaba Declaration =

2021 declaration in Nigeria

The Asaba Declaration was a declaration issued by the 17 Southern governors in Nigeria, comprising South West, South South and South East. It was issued on 11 May 2021 in Asaba, Delta State, Nigeria and consisted of eleven points in which the governors raised key issues about the future of Nigeria and the Southern region. They called for national dialogue and placed a ban on open grazing and the movement of cattle by foot into and within the Southern region due to the ongoing Herder–farmer conflicts in Nigeria.

== Eleven points ==
The Declaration by the 17 governors of the southern region cited eleven points:

1. United Nigeria (point 1): The governors affirmed that "the peoples of Southern Nigeria remain committed to the unity of Nigeria on the basis of justice, fairness, equity and oneness and peaceful co-existence between and among its peoples with a focus on the attainment of shared goals for economic development and prosperity."
2. Security challenges and open grazing ban (point 2): The governors observed that "the incursion of armed herders, criminals and bandits into the Southern part of the country has presented a severe security challenge such that citizens are not able to live their normal lives including pursuing various productive activities leading to a threat to food supply and general security" and resolved that "open grazing of cattle be banned across Southern Nigeria."
3. Conflict with Herders and open grazing ban enforcement (point 3): The governors noted that "development and population growth has put pressure on available land and increased the prospects of conflict between migrating herders and local populations in the South" and noted that its now "imperative to enforce the ban on open grazing in the South (including cattle movement to the South by foot)."
4. Development of modern livestock management systems (point 4): The governors recommended that "the Federal Government should support WILLING States to develop alternative and modern livestock management systems."
5. Restructuring of Nigeria (point 5): The governors agreed that "the progress of the nation requires that urgent and bold steps be taken to restructure the Nigerian Federation leading to the evolution of state police, review of revenue allocation formula in favour of the sub-national governments and creation of other institutions which legitimately advance our commitment to and practice of true federalism."
6. National dialogue due to secessionist agitations (point 6): The governors recommended that "in view of widespread agitations among our various peoples for greater inclusiveness in existing governance arrangements, the Federal Government should convoke a national dialogue as a matter of urgency."
7. Reflection of federal character in appointments (point 7): The governors recommended that "in deference to the sensitivities of our various peoples, there is a need to review appointments into Federal Government Agencies (including Security Agencies) to reflect the federal character as Nigeria's overall population is heterogenous."
8. Foster cooperation (point 8): The governors resolved "to foster cooperation among the Southern States and the nation at large."
9. Gridlock on Oshodi Apapa Expressway and establishment of ports (point 9): The governors expressed concern "on the continued gridlock on the Oshodi-Apapa Expressway and the chokehold it has exerted on the nation's economy being the sole outlet from Apapa Wharf" and recommended "the activation and establishment of ports in other States of the federation to create new jobs and promote socio-economic activities in the country."
10. Dealing with the COVID-19 pandemic (point 10): The governors expressed concern "on the economic implications of another lockdown on the country, and therefore suggested greater coordination and cooperation between Federal and State Governments in evolving strategies for dealing with the pandemic."
11. Address by the President on the issue of security (point 11): The governors expressed very grave concern "on the security challenge currently plaguing the nation and strongly urged that Mr. President should address Nigerians on the challenges of insecurity and restore the confidence of our people."

== Reception ==
The Asaba Declaration received positive and negative reception from the general public. The Southern Senators Forum applauded the Declaration, describing it as a "timely intervention", while Southern members in the House of Representatives also supported it. Afenifere, Middle Belt Forum and Yoruba Council of Elders said the Declaration was a welcome idea and bold development, while noting that it came late. Pan Niger Delta Forum also applauded the Declaration.

The Minister of Justice and Attorney General of the Federation, Abubakar Malami opposed the Declaration over the ban on open grazing and termed it "unconstitutional", while also opposing calls for restructuring. The Senate President of Nigeria, Ahmad Lawan cautioned the Southern governors against joining the agitations for secession or restructuring of the country and said that "the Southern governors must ensure that they restructure their respective states first before calling for restructuring at the federal level".

The Miyetti Allah called the Declaration "a call for secession", "an empty policy" and "declaration of war on herders", while noting that the Southern Governors are "confused and mischievous". A former Senate Majority leader, Mohammed Ali Ndume accused the Southern governors of playing politics and "engaging in a blame game". A founding member of Arewa Consultative Forum, Tanko Yakasai said the Declaration is "unconstitutional". A former executive secretary of National Health Insurance Scheme, Usman Yusuf opposed the Declaration and said that "Southern governors must provide land for Fulani herdsmen to graze their cattle if they want to ban open grazing, while calling it "irresponsible and dangerous".
