= Mgban massacre =

- Part of Herder-farmer conflicts in Nigeria
- Location: Local Government Education Authority Primary School Mgban, Mgban, Guma LGA, Benue State, Nigeria
- Date: 7 April 2023
- Target: IDPs
- Deaths: 43
- Perpetrator: Fulani herdsmen

On 7 April 2023, unknown attackers suspected to be Fulani herdsmen attacked an IDP camp in Mgban, Guma LGA, Benue State, Nigeria, killing 43 people. The massacre occurred on the same day as the Umogidi massacre, where Fulani herdsmen attacked funeralgoers also in Benue.

== Background ==
In Benue State, armed gangs of Fulani herdsmen have been in conflict with sedentary non-Fulani farmers for decades, but it was not until the late 2010s that the conflict really militarized. Benue is part of Nigeria's Middle Belt, where Muslim and Christian groups coexist and often clash. Between 3 and 7 March, Fulani herdsmen attacked several villages in Kwande LGA of Benue, killing over 50 people. In the weeks leading up to the Mgban attack, 15 people were killed in Ikobi and several other smaller attacks occurred.

Thousands of civilians have been displaced in these attacks into IDP camps across Benue.

== Massacre ==
Little has been reported about the massacre outside of statements by Benue state police spokeswoman Catherine Anene. The massacre took place on the evening of Good Friday, and armed gunmen entered the camp and shot indiscriminately at residents. The victims of the attacks had been forced to flee violence by Fulani herdsmen prior. Survivors of the attack confirmed that the attackers were herdsmen, and added that many victims died while trying to flee the gunshots. Initial reports by the Benue government stated 28 people were killed in the Mgban massacre, but this was revised upwards to 38 and later 43. The Mgban massacre was the deadliest IDP camp massacre during the herder-farmer conflicts in recent memory.
