= Animal agriculture in Nigeria =

Cattle Rearing In Nigeria

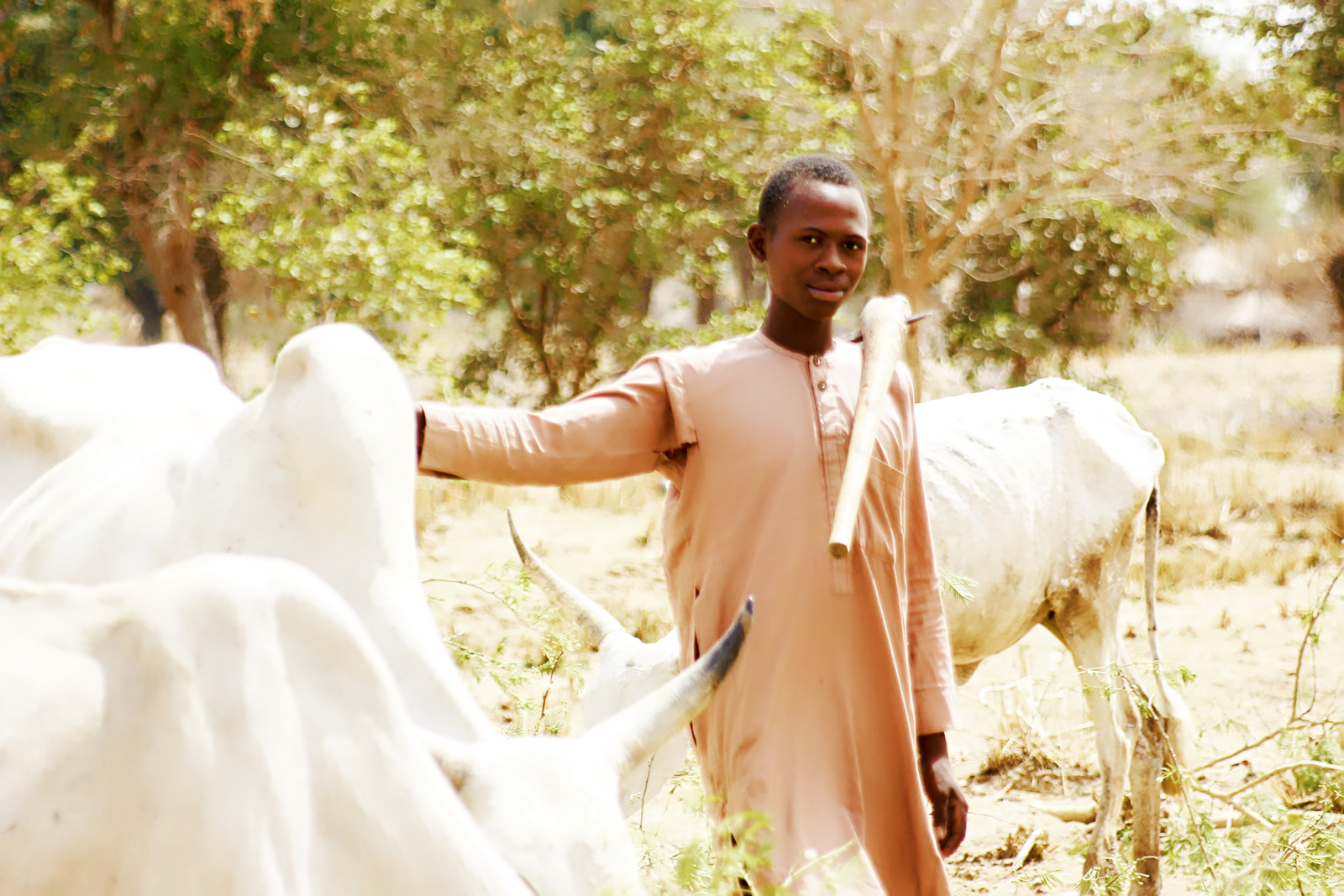
A farmer and his cow

The majority of herders in African countries are livestock owners. Livestock farming is a part of Nigeria's agriculture system. In 2017, Nigeria had approximately over 80 million poultry farming, 76 million goats, 43.4 million sheep, 18.4 million cattle, 7.5 million pigs, and 1.4 million of its equivalent. Livestock farming is about 5% of Nigeria's gross domestic product and 17% of its agricultural gross domestic product.

In Nigeria, there is always an increase in meat demand and this is seen as an economic development growth. Animal husbandry in Nigeria therefore has changed the narrative due to population growth in urbanization and agricultural practices. Traditional nomadic pastoralism has transitioned to sedentary and intensive grazing, leading to the increased pressure on gazetted areas. Overgrazing, particularly in fragile ecosystems such as the savannas and woodland areas, has caused loss of vegetation, soil, and biodiversity. Types of Animal agriculture in Nigeria are:

== Poultry Farming ==
This is one of the most common Animal agriculture in Nigeria. It is known as the king of livestock farming in Nigeria. The common animals are the chickens,

Turkey, Quail and Ducks etc.

== Two Major Types of Animal Agriculture in Nigeria ==
Apart from poultry farming in Nigeria, there are also two types of animal agriculture. One is for food requirements such as milk and another for labour purposes such as ploughing, irrigation, and so on. While dairy animals are those that produce milk (e.g., goats, buffalo, cows, etc.), draught animals are animals that are used for labour.

== Environmental impacts ==
Animal grazing and deforestation is a significant environmental issue with a far-reaching implications for ecosystems. Nigeria has a large number of livestock including cattle, sheep, and goats, which depend on grazing for sustenance. However, the traditional and modern practices of animal grazing have contributed to deforestation and other severe environmental degradation.

=== Deforestation ===
Deforestation in Nigeria is caused by many factors, including agricultural expansion, logging, firewood collection, and infrastructural development. The expansion of grazing areas and the clearing of forests for pastureland significantly contributed to deforestation rates. This loss of forest in Nigeria has profound consequences for climate regulation, water resources, and the overall health of ecosystems.

The relationship between animal grazing and deforestation in Nigeria is complex and intertwined. On one hand, excessive grazing and overstocking of animals has contributed to the degradation and depletion of forests. On the other hand, deforestation limits the availability of suitable grazing land, forcing herders to encroach further into forested areas, perpetuating a destructive cycle.

The socioeconomic impact of animal grazing and deforestation is substantial. Livelihoods dependent on forest resources, such as indigenous communities and small-scale farmers, are adversely affected. Displacement, loss of access to natural resources, and conflicts between herders and farmers over land exacerbate the socioeconomic challenges faced by affected communities. Moreover, deforestation and land degradation have negative implications for agricultural productivity, food security, and overall economic development.

Addressing the issue of animal grazing and deforestation in Nigeria requires a comprehensive approach. This includes the promotion of sustainable grazing practices, the implementation of effective land-use policies and regulations, the restoration of degraded areas, and the engagement of local communities and stakeholders in conservation efforts. It is essential to strike a balance between the economic needs of pastoralists and the preservation of forests, biodiversity, and ecosystem services for long-term sustainability.

== Herder-farmer conflicts ==
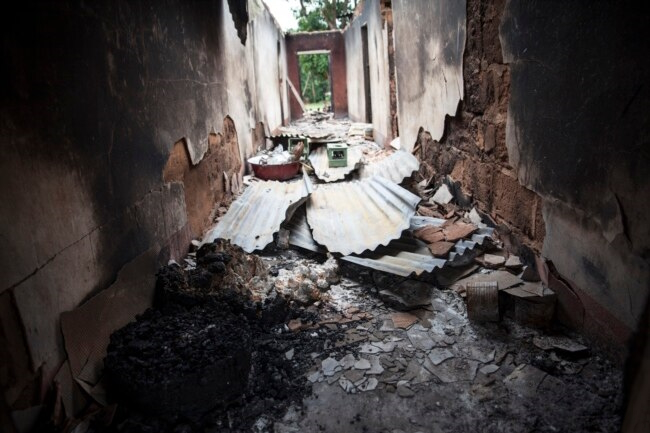
A house that was burned down in a suspected herdsman attack in Nimbo, May 2016

Across Nigeria, there are a series of disputes over arable land between Fulani herders and non-Fulani farmers. The conflicts have been especially prominent in the Middle Belt (North Central) since the return of democracy in 1999. More recently, they have deteriorated into attacks on farmers by Fulani herders.

Attacks have also taken place in Northwestern Nigeria against farmers who are mainly Hausa, who are almost entirely Muslim. Many Fulani communities, who are usually farmers, have also been attacked and raided by Fulani bandits and other militias. The conflict has taken on religious and ethnic dimensions: many of the farmers are Christians of various ethnicities while most of the herders are Muslim Fulani. Thousands of people have died since the attacks began. Sedentary farming in rural communities are often targets of attacks because of their vulnerability. There are fears that the conflict will spread to other West African countries, but that has often been downplayed by governments in the region. Attacks on herders have also led them to retaliating by attacking other communities.

== States In Nigeria That are Mostly Engaged In Animal Farming/rearing ==
The States that are mostly engaged in Animal rearing in Nigeria are:

- Katsina State
- Adamawa State
- Taraba State
- Kano State
- Bauchi State
- Gombe State
- Borno State
