= Ruga policy =

Nigerian policy

The Ruga policy (lit. 'human settlement policy') is a Nigerian policy intended to reduce herder–farmer conflicts in Nigeria. Introduced by the Buhari presidency, it is aimed at resolving the conflict between nomadic Fulani herdsmen and sedentary farmers. The policy, which is currently suspended, would "create reserved communities where herders will live, grow and tend their cattle, produce milk and undertake other activities associated with the cattle business without having to move around in search of grazing land for their cows."

== Etymology ==
Ruga (or Rugga) Fulani word for human settlement, and can also be interpreted as the acronym of "rural grazing area"...

== History ==
The policy was developed by the National Livestock Transformation Plan under the Nigeria Economy Council to curb the conflict between farmers and Fulani herdsmen.

== Criticism ==
The Government of Nigeria, under the former General Olusegun Obasanjo and his deputy, General Shehu Musa Yar'Adua, who conceived the policy, and current president Muhammad Buhari, attempted to implement the policy.

Southerners, believed the policy was designed to benefit the Fulani Herders, so largely opposed the measures developed by the Buhari government perceiving the policy as an attempt at 'Fulanization' of the affected areas.

Benue State, which has had a lot of violence between herdsmen and farmers, aligned with its southern counterparts on this issue, notwithstanding that the state is situated along the Middle Belt axis, where its sister states have joined the North to beckon to Ruga. But the Nigerian Government made the policy permanent, to end the incessant conflict killings of farmers and herdsmen in local communities where Fulani herdsmen take their cattle to graze.

The suspension came on a day the Arewa youths, under the aegis of Coalition of Northern Groups, CNG, gave southern leaders 30 days to accept the Ruga Project in peace, and a 30-day ultimatum to President Buhari to implement the programme.

== See also ==
- Herder–farmer conflicts in Nigeria
