= 2018 massacres in Benue and Kogi States =

In 2018, several massacres occurred in Benue and Kogi, in central Nigeria, supposedly by Fulani herdsmen gunmen. At least 50 were killed in all.
