= Chrislam =

Assemblage of Christian and Islamic religious practices in Nigeria

Chrislam is a Christian expression of Islam, originating as an assemblage of Christian and Islamic religious practices in Nigeria; in particular, the series of religious movements that merged Christian and Muslim religious practice during the 1970s in Lagos, Nigeria. The movement was pioneered by the Yoruba people in south-west Nigeria. Chrislam works against the conventional understanding of Christianity and Islam as two separate and exclusive religions, seeking out commonalities between both religions and promoting an inclusive union of the two. Chrislam also occupies a distinct geographical space; Nigeria is often understood to be geographically and religiously polarized, with a predominantly Muslim North, and a predominantly Christian South.

Nigeria is religiously split mostly between Muslims and Christians. Nigeria is the most populous country of Africa, with over 213 million inhabitants as of 2021. Muslims and Christians each comprise roughly half of the total population. Muslim and Christian encounters in Nigeria have long underpinned sociocultural tensions in the country. Although this has created a political ground for religious and ethnic clashes, this has also required Muslims and Christians to long coexist in Nigeria. Whilst Nigerian Muslims and Christians have experienced periods of sectarian and inter-religious violence, Muslims and Christians have also experienced prolonged periods of social harmony.

There is a limited anthology on Chrislam studies, largely due to its relatively small following predominantly concentrated in Lagos. Some of the most prominent findings have been uncovered by specialists Dr. Marloes Janson, Birgit Meyer, Mustapha Bello and Professor Corey L. Williams. Janson defines Chrislam as an "assemblage" of religious practice, stating that the underlying religious concept of Chrislam is that "to be a Muslim or Christian alone is not enough to guarantee success in this world and the hereafter." As a result, Chrislam combines both Muslim and Christian practices. Chrislam has been described as a unique phenomenon in Nigeria, reflecting the country's religious divisions and history of religious clashes between Muslim and Christian groups.

== Origins in Yorubaland ==
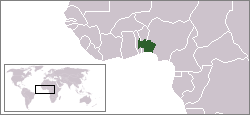
Location of Yorubaland in South-West Nigeria

Chrislam occupies a distinct geographical space, being pioneered in the ethnically diverse and highly ethnically populated Yorubaland region. Yorubaland is known as a cultural region, being home to a population with a remarkable degree of cultural affinity. The region stretches from south-west Nigeria, across the Republic of Benin and to central Togo. The continual intermixing of ethnic peoples in Yorubaland precedes colonization and the modern-day borders of Nigeria, Togo and Benin. Yorubaland is home to three major ethnic groups: the Yorùbá, the Aja and the Ìbààbá peoples. As a result, cultural and inter-ethnic tolerance has been a characteristic feature of the region. According to Professor D. Laitin, "Muslim and Christian Yorubas see themselves culturally as Yorubas rather than as Muslims or Christians," and place a higher degree of value on common ethnicity over religious affiliations. Hence, Chrislam has been able to thrive in Yorubaland as a Yoruba phenomenon: whereby shared ethnic identities makes religious mixing possible.

Although cultural distinction has been blurred, Yorubaland proves unique as the social and ethnic interaction has not led to the extinction of the unique characteristics of each group. Rather, the groups remain distinguishable, yet coexist in a densely populated and highly interactive ethnic region.

== Muslim–Christian tensions in Nigeria ==
=== The Sharia debate (1977–1979) ===
The question of Sharia in Nigeria greatly exacerbated Muslim–Christian tensions in the late 70s, when Nigeria adopted a new constitution after shifting from military to civil political rule. The question in 1978 was whether Nigeria would adopt a secular constitution, or subscribe to Sharia law. Given the relatively even split of Nigeria's Muslim population—constituting almost 50% of the population—the viability of Sharia law was uncertain for the Nigerian state. This created conflict with Nigeria's Christian population, as well as other minority religions that opposed the adoption of Sharia law.

The Supreme Military Council appointed the Constitutional Drafting Committee, which proposed the role of a Federal Sharia Court of Appeal. This dated back to the period of indirect rule under the British, who helped rationalize an Islamic court system in the North from 1933 onwards. Following the end of the colonial era, Sharia criminal law was replaced with a comprehensive secular criminal code for the newly independent nation. Thereafter, the Court of Appeal was limited to civil cases between Muslim litigants, and there was no longer a final court of appeal for matters relating to Sharia law. This served as a strategic political move to limit the unified power of the Northern states; establishing Sharia law in the North would have necessitated a state-acknowledged political existence of a legally distinct Northern Region.

Moreover, the North-South divide meant that the establishment of Sharia Law would have served as a counterweight to the concentrated economic and social power of the South. The South, which has never practiced Sharia law, captured the majority of jobs in civil service and commerce during the colonial period. The adoption of Sharia law served as a symbolic assertion of the North's influence on the Constitution, and as a leverage against the economic and administrative power of the South. The Sharia debate resulted in a wave of political and religious explosiveness, with fears and conspiracies of a consolidated Islamic Republic in the North. The 1979 Constitution eliminated all provisions for a Federal Sharia Court of Appeal.

=== Socioeconomic factors ===
The Muslim–Christian conflict has also been attributed to various socioeconomic grievances that are a product of colonial and postcolonial conditions. The disparaging wealth gap between Nigeria's predominantly Muslim north and Christian south has colonial era roots, with the British favoring the emergence of a Christian elite governing class. This elite class went on to control much of the postcolonial economy, with much of Nigeria's economy being focused in the south in major cities such as the capital, Abuja.

The south-west Yorubaland proves an exception to the Muslim–Christian geographical divide, existing as a religiously plural vicinity. Yorubaland is home to Muslims, Christians and practitioners of traditional Yoruba religion, who have coexisted for centuries and are relatively evenly mixed amongst the population.

Furthermore, the Muslim–Christian struggle has heavily involved college students across the country. In 1987, Christians belonging to the Federation of Christian Students at the College of Education in Kafanchan, Kaduna, organized what they called the "Mission '87 in Jesus Campus," This was placed on a banner at the entrance of the college, so as to assert the campus as a Christian religious space. Muslim students proceeded to remove the banner and began to protest a talk being delivered on campus by a Muslim convert to Christianity. Muslim students claimed that the converted Muslim was misinterpreting Quranic verses and discrediting the teachings of Muhammad. This religious struggle then extended beyond the college campus, resulting in violence amongst Muslim and Christian students across urban centers in Northern and Central Nigeria. College campuses remained a hotbed for Muslim–Christian tensions in the following years.

=== Influence of Nigerian Pentecostalism ===
The rise of Pentecostalism in Nigeria has contributed to the onset of Chrislam and the changing religious landscape in the country. Pentecostalism was pioneered by university staff and students in Nigeria's urban centers in the 1970s, and is seen as a product of increased higher education and urban growth fueled by oil revenues. The emergence of Nigerian Pentecostalism began in the 1970s, during a particularly prosperous era for Nigeria's South due to the oil-boom of the 1970s. For the south, an elite class emerged and profited, participating in conspicuous consumption and forming a connected upper-class network. This further intensified wealth gaps in Nigerian society, and Pentecostal leaders openly condemned the accumulation of wealth.

Subsequently, with the 1980s economic crisis spiraling the continent into economic downturn, and the rapid decline in political conditions, an increasing number of Nigerians turned towards Pentecostalism for guidance and grounding. Pentecostalism had particular appeal due to its teaching of the potential to be "born again" as Christians through encounters with Jesus. The promise of being born again provided many Nigerians with spiritual grounding and optimism amidst economic devastation. Furthermore, Nigerian Pentecostalism drew many followers away from mainline Protestant, Roman Catholic and African Independent churches. This further contributed to religious polarization and cleavages in the country, with conflict between sects of Christianity as well as non-Christian faiths.

Muslim–Christian tensions in the 1970s are characterized as primarily youth-based and mutually demonizing campaigns, using rhetoric to pit each group against the other. Pentecostal theology condemned Islamic healing practices, Sufi rituals and Islamic symbols. Pentecostalism also played a prominent role in opposition to Sharia law and fueled conspiracies of an Islamic takeover of the continent by 2005. Moreover, Nigerian Pentecostalism iterated rhetoric of "a life and death battle with the enemy," which was widely interpreted as a reference to a battle against Muslims. Muslims responded through the rise of Reformist Islam, calling for a revival and strict adherence to Islamic traditions. This included the rise of proselytization campaigns, and mirroring the rhetoric of Pentecostal groups through vilifying rhetoric against Christians.

== Development ==
=== First wave: Ifeoluwa (since 1976) ===
The first dated Chrislam movement is traced to a Yoruba man named Tela Tella. Tella was originally a Muslim prior to his career as a Chrislam preacher. "Ifeoluwa" is translated from Yoruba to mean "the love of God", which Tella uses to refer to his Chrislam mission. Similar to Islam, Ifeoluwa is based on 5 pillars: "love," "mercy," "joy," "good deeds," and "truth."

The Ifeoluwa creed reads:

The God of Jesus is One
The God of Muhammad is One
Humanity is One
Chrislam, Chrislam, Chrislam

Marloes Janson is a specialist on the study of Chrislam in Nigeria, and has conducted extensive research in the area including direct interviews and transcripts of Tella's sermons. According to Janson, Tella refers to himself as "an instrument in the hands of God," and says that God communicates with him through divine revelations. Tella conducts services for a small congregation in Lagos, who meet weekly on Saturdays. Tella explains that he did not want to conduct services on Friday because it leant itself to the Muslim faith, nor on Sundays for fear of favoring the Christian faith. The Saturday service takes place in Tella's temple, which Janson describes as "a garage-like white building with in the middle a colorful altar that is separated from the prayer ground where, like in a mosque, the congregation sits on the floor." Worship includes Muslim and Christian songs, the Quran and Bible are both consulted, and prayers combine Muslim and Christian elements. The sermon is delivered in Yoruba and English. In addition to the weekly Saturday service, a Holy Ghost service is held on Friday which constitutes an all-night prayer meeting. Once a year, a pilgrimage to "Mount Authority" is made, which lasts for three days of uninterrupted prayer and fasting. Tella states that as Muslims have Mecca and Christians have Jerusalem, the holy site of pilgrimage for Chrislamists is Mount Authority, which was divinely chosen by God.

Tella states that the holy scriptures of Islam and Christianity are "incomplete and contain some inaccuracies", so he is working on compiling the Ifeoluwa Book, which will be the last holy book, containing his divine revelations. Tella's teachings focus on the closeness of Islam and Christianity, and how God does not love one religion over the other.

==== Ifeoluwa membership ====
To become a member of Ifeoluwa, members must pass an initiation rite that requires years of spiritual training. The Initiation Rite involves the observance of 80 rules and regulations that strictly outline a moral Chrislam lifestyle, including dress codes such as head-covering practices in Islam, and dietary restrictions based on the Old Testament. Initiates then progress along a series of religious ranks, with each rank being symbolized by colored belts worn on white gowns. Initiates must also fast on Fridays, the most holy day in the Muslim calendar, to obtain spiritual closeness to God.

=== Second wave: Oke Tude (since 1989) ===
In 1989, Dr. Samsindeen Saka (some sources spell his first name Shamsuddin or Samsudeen) claimed to found his own Chrislam movement. The Yoruba name Oke Tude is translated to "The Mountain of Losing Bondage," alluding to Pentecostal discourse. Oke Tude stipulates that progress in life is inhibited by evil powers that hold persons trapped in bondage with Satan. Like Tella, Saka was also a former Muslim prior to his rebirth as a Chrislamist. After returning from a Hajj pilgrimage to Mecca, he was inspired to launch his new ministry.

Tude is the religious ritual of "running deliverance," during which worshippers run 7 times around a replica of the Kaaba which contains a well of holy water, while shouting "Allahu Akbar" and "Hallelujah." It is believed that running deliverance will free individuals of evil forces and allow possession of the Holy Spirit.

A PBS special aired in 2008 featured a sermon from a small church in Lagos, Nigeria. When speaking of his divine revelations, Saka stated that "Then there is a lot of people killing themselves in Nigeria 19 years ago. So I was praying and lying down and the Lord told me, 'Make peace between Muslims and Christians.'"

Saka operates his main Chrislam worship center in Lagos, with three smaller Oke Tude branches in Lagos, three in Abuja, one in Ibadan and a house fellowship in London. Sermons involve both the Quran and Bible, worship songs and dance, and Saka's sermons - which he calls lectures. Moreover, Saka emphasizes the shared origins of the two faiths as Abrahamic religions. In the 2008 PBS special, Saka tells his congregation that "Abraham has many children, and is the Father of Islam and the Father of Christianity. Why are the Muslims and Christians fighting?"

The Oke Tude anthem states:

Our God, the Creator, hear us
Oh God, bless the Prophet Isa (Jesus)
And the noble Prophet (Muhammad)
Oh God, bless Samsindeen (Saka)
And the noble Prophet
Oke Tude, deliver us
Deliver us from illness
Oke Tude, deliver us

==== Oke Tude membership ====
To become a member of Oke Tude, conversion from previous religious affiliations is not necessary. Initiates must buy a copy of both the Bible and Quran, and are expected to run Tude for 7 consecutive days. During initiation, new members sometimes temporarily stay in the Oke Tude guesthouse, which is run by Saka and serves as an additional source of income for him.

Oke Tude also offers a special spiritual outlet for women seeking to bear children. Many women who have been unable to conceive have joined Oke Tude due to its promise of destroying the 'yoke of barrenness' through specific prayer rituals. Additionally, Oke Tude has attracted many unemployed and disenfranchised youth from the Lagos area, thanks to opportunities of small loans, business opportunities, and social networking connections offered by Saka.

== Ogbómòsó Society of Chrislam (OSC) ==
One of the newest and best-known iterations of the movement comes from the Ogbómòsó Society of Chrislam (OSC), founded in 2005. The society was pioneered by a small group of university students and claims to be formed as a "vision from God." Today, the group has over 200 active members and teaches that Islam, Christianity and African Indigenous Religions are derived from the same source and should be reunited into a single religious movement. The OSC emphasizes what they deem a "spirit of accommodation," working to synthesize texts and traditions from Muslim, Christian and traditional African faiths. During the weekly service, the OSC consults the Quran, the Bible, and the Odu Ifá (the Yoruba literary corpus) and "The God of Africa, Jesus and Muhammad" are called upon in unison. A frequent liturgical creed of the OSC states "There is no God but God and only one religion. There are many prophets and divinities but only one God."

The OSC reiterates Chrislam missions of the past, whilst emphasizing a syncretic approach that amasses traditional African religions to the same extent as Muslim and Christian elements. Moreover, the mission emphasizes that there is one overarching God which unites all faiths, yet many prophets and divinities exist to spread the word of God. Rituals include Yemaya Wudu, which incorporates the Islamic practice of washing in preparation for prayer and worship, and fusing it with Christian baptismal practice and prayer to Yemoja, a Yoruba river deity.

== Contemporary religious violence ==
Map of the Boko Haram Insurgency concentrated in North-East Nigeria

Chrislam serves as a counterweight to the prolonged and ongoing violence between Muslim and Christian groups in Nigeria. Both Tella and Saka preach of the need for love between Muslims and Christians in an era of violence. In the 2008 PBS special, Saka tells his congregation that "Abraham has many children, and is the Father of Islam and the Father of Christianity. Why are the Muslims and Christians fighting?" alluding to the rising Muslim–Christian violence as a result of Boko Haram.

== Syncretic religion in Africa ==
Religious syncretism has been a phenomenon across Africa since the spread of Islam and Christianity across the continent. The blending of traditional African religions and global mega-religions has existed since colonization, as the arrival of Islam and Christianity never erased the practice of traditional faiths. Moreover, the polytheistic tradition has been common across the continent, which has been conducive to the rise of religious pluralism.

Chrislam has not been considered an unusual phenomenon in Africa, although it maintains a marginal religious following. "Spirituality without boundaries" is a term coined by Michigan University anthropologist Mara Leichtman, and refers to religious fluidity within the African context. For example, it is not uncommon across Africa to see Muslims lighting candles for the Virgin Mary, or to believe in Jesus and pray to multiple prophets, which Leichtman recalls witnessing during her time researching Senegal. In Nigeria, Igbo peoples have also been known to practice religious syncretism through the amalgamation of Christianity and traditional African religion. Similarly, Nigeria has also seen syncretism between Igbo Muslim and traditional African religions predating the rise of Chrislam, particularly in Lagos State.

== See also ==
- Fula Christians
- Fulani extremism in Nigeria
- Isawa
- Muslim Hebraists
