= Fula Christians =

Fula people of Christian faith

Fula Christians are members of the Fula people who profess Christianity in all their denominations. Due to the strong historical Muslim tradition of this ethnic group, religious conversion has been low. It is estimated that around 1% of the total Fula population belongs to a religion other than Islam or to some African traditional faiths with a predominant Islamic religious syncretism.

== Evangelization to the Fula people ==
The Fula were one of the first Islamized peoples in Africa, abandoning their ancient ancestral spiritual traditions and strongly embedding the teachings of Muhammad in their daily lives. For this reason, attempts to evangelize the Fula peoples have historically been unsuccessful, considering in many cases that they directly associate their sense of ethnic identity with Islam as well. In some cases, intermarriage with a Christian person not belonging to a Fula tribe has allowed the religious conversion of the Muslim Fula, not without challenges of discrimination and social rejection by their peers.

As a result of these mixtures and unions of peaceful coexistence, social inclusion and tolerance particularly in the Yorubaland, Nigeria, some elements of the Christian faith are mixed in religious syncretism with Islamic traditions, forming a type of "Chrislam" with both faiths belonging to the Abrahamic religions.

== Persecution of Fula Christians ==
Fula Christians suffer different types of threats from radical and Islamic extremist groups in the historical territories where the Fula people live. The situation is even more complex when attacks by Muslim Fulanis (especially Fulani herdsmen) on Christian Fulanis have been reported, who consider them as traitors and carry out arson attacks on churches and entire communities, which also include massacres of dozens and hundreds of civilian Christian faithful. Such incidents have occurred in northern Nigeria during the 21st century as part of the Fulani extremism.
