= CONAECDA =

Nigerian organization

- Conference of Autochthonous Ethnic Nationalities Communities Development Associations
- Purpose: Community development, language education, indigenous land rights
- Region served: Central and Northern Nigeria
- Members: 15 states (2021)
- Official language: English and indigenous languages of Nigeria
- Secretary General: Suleman A.D. Sukukum

CONAECDA (acronym for Conference of Autochthonous Ethnic Nationalities Communities Development Associations) is an organization that serves as a coalition of indigenous ethnic communities in central and northern Nigeria. CONAECDA works in diverse areas such as language development, community development, and indigenous land rights. It represents a few hundred indigenous groups that are spread across 15 Nigerian states.

== Overview ==
CONAECDA has chapters in 15 Nigerian states, including Kogi State, Benue State, Yobe State, Kwara State, Plateau State, Kaduna State, Bauchi State, Nassarawa State, Taraba State, Adamawa State, Niger State, and other states.

Many ethnic groups from the Middle Belt of Nigeria have representatives with CONAECDA.

The Secretary General of CONAECDA is Dr. Suleman A.D. Sukukum.

== Indigenous languages ==
CONAECDA is active in promoting minority and local ethnic languages in Nigeria. It has asked state governments in Nigeria to allow local ethnic languages to be taught in the educational system. It has also organized workshops and conferences across Nigeria relating to language development, language education, community development, and indigenous rights. CONAECDA also collaborates with SIL International on language documentation and development.

== See also ==
- Middle Belt
- Herder–farmer conflicts in Nigeria
