= Ngarbuh massacre =

2020 attack in Cameroon

Coordinates: 06°20′52″N 10°46′13″E

- Part of the Anglophone Crisis
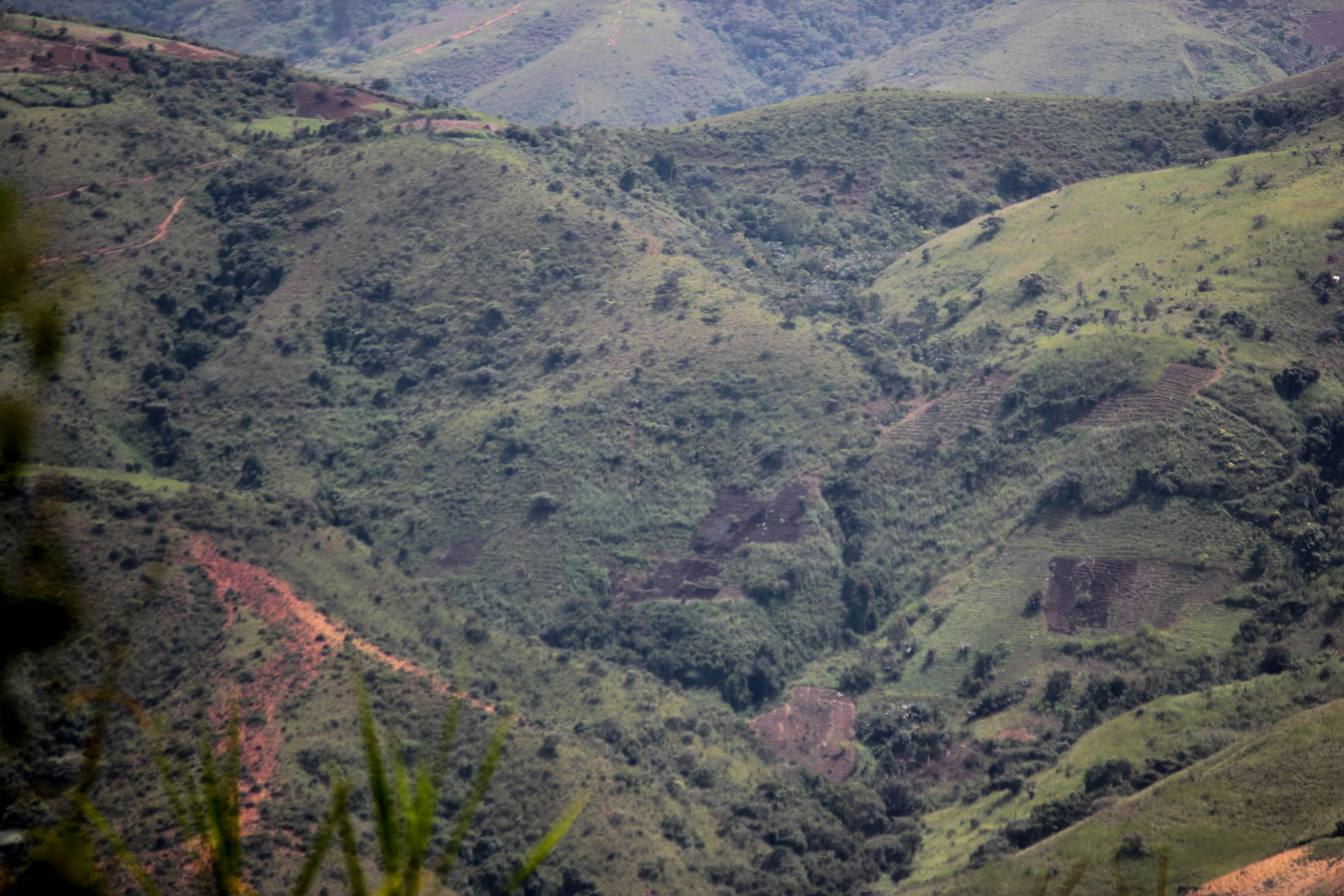
- Highlands of Ngarbuh
- Location: Ngarbuh, Ntumbaw, Ndu, Donga-Mantung Division, Northwest Region, Cameroon
- Date: 14 February 2020
- Target: Civilians
- Attack type: Shooting, mass murder
- Deaths: 22+
- Perpetrators: Cameroon Armed Forces, Mbororo militants
- Motive: Fulani extremism, anti-Ambazonian sentiment

The Ngarbuh massacre took place in northwestern Cameroon on 14 February 2020 during the Anglophone Crisis, and resulted in the murder of 21 civilians, including 13 children, by Cameroonian soldiers and armed Fulani militia.

== Massacre ==
On 14 February 2020, six Cameroonian soldiers, accompanied by armed Mbororos and Ambazonian detractors, carried out a massacre of civilians in Ngarbuh, two quarters of Ntumbaw Ntumbaw Village, in Ndu, Donga-Mantung Division, Northwest Region. The two quarters that make up what is called Ngarbuh are known in Ntumbaw as Sirngar (Ngar) Mabuh (buh). Calling the area Ngarbuh was introduced after the 1980s when the government set up as school and located it between the two quarters of Ntumbaw, hence the designation Ngarbuh. It is therefore a designation of two sub chiefdoms each governed by a Fai, called in Limbum, Tallanwe.

There are conflicting reports of the total number of civilian casualties. Independent journalist Jess Craig, on assignment in the region for the Swiss-based publication The New Humanitarian, conducted the only independent, on-the-ground investigation of the incident. Speaking with dozens of eye witnesses the day after the attack, Craig reported that 21 civilians had been killed including 13 children and one pregnant women. Other reports stated that at least 22 people were killed, including 14 children, 9 of whom were younger than 5. The attack was part of the Anglophone Crisis, an armed conflict between separatists of proto-state Ambazonia (comprising Northwest and Southwest Regions) and Francophone Cameroon.

Initially no party to the conflict claimed responsibility for the attack, while the separatists blamed Cameroonian security forces. In the village of Ntumbaw itself, it was alleged that one of the former Ambazonia fighters who had defected to the government returned to Ntumbaw and told a crowd that if the Ntumbaw people did not get rid of Amba fighters the army would return to perpetrate further attacks. The Cameroonian government initially denied responsibility. It is alleged that the Senior Divisional Office of Donga Mantung Division went to Ntumbaw and held talks with the villagers and, at a press conference, the Chief of Ntumbaw stated that the killings were not carried out by the military.

As more evidence was gathered it was clear that the military had carried out the atrocities. Several weeks prior to the massacre, it was alleged that members of the army set up a monitoring station in Ntumbaw. The Cameroonian government later admitted that the Cameroonian Army had been responsible for the deaths, and claimed civilians were killed by an accidental explosion that had been triggered when stray bullets had hit a fuel tank during a firefight with separatists. The Cameroonian Army claimed to have killed seven separatists during the incident. Opposition parties and aid agencies rejected this explanation, accusing the army of carrying out a massacre of civilians. Local residents said that 35 people were killed by the Army, who broke into residents houses, where they shot civilians and burned their houses. The Cameroonian government continued to insist that only five civilians had been killed, although independent sources were able to verify the names of 25 dead civilians already the day after the attack. Attempting to cover up the details of the incident, on 24 February, soldiers arrested a man who had given information about the Ngarbuh massacre to the media. An alleged eye witness to the massacre was murdered on 29 February.

Human Rights Watch ran an investigation, interviewing 23 people, three of whom witnessed the attack. The investigation debunked the claims made by the government and established that Cameroonian soldiers and armed Fulani had carried out a massacre of civilians. Human Rights Watch also confirmed that there had been no separatist fighters present during the massacre. The Cameroonian government responded to the report by accusing the author of conspiring with the separatists to create false stories.

== Reactions ==
The incident drew worldwide attention and condemnation from rights organisations and foreign governments. The United Nations condemned the attack, and encouraged Cameroon to prosecute the perpetrators. This reaction was echoed by that of the United States. Cameroonian opposition politician Maurice Kamto called for a national day of mourning.

In early March, it was reported that the Cameroonian Army had arrested and questioned nine soldiers about the massacre, including two colonels. After running its own investigation, the government concluded that three soldiers and a local vigilante group had accidentally killed 13 civilians during a firefight with separatist fighters. After realizing their mistake, the report claimed, the soldiers and the militiamen set fire to buildings in order to erase any evidence. Three soldiers were subsequently arrested.

The report and the arrests were met with appreciation internationally and by human rights organizations, while the Ambazonia Governing Council accused the Cameroonian government of "presenting false justification of the systematic killing of civilians".

== Aftermath ==
In late May 2020, the military set up a base in Ngarbuh, with the stated aim of cutting off a separatist supply route from Nigeria. Within a week, more than 300 villagers had fled, fearing the presence of soldiers.

Ntumbaw continued to be a battleground between separatists and armed Mbororos. On 12 May 2020, around 30 armed Mbororos killed two civilians after accusing separatists of killing seven Mbororos. In October, armed Mbororos killed a separatist fighter, and were subsequently hunted down by separatists.

In February 2026, three soldiers were sentenced to prison time for taking part in the massacre.

== See also ==
- Killings in Missong
