= 2019 Kaduna State massacre =

2019 terrorist attacks in Nigeria

- Part of Nigerian bandit conflict and Mass killings in Southern Kaduna
- Location: 10°20′N 7°45′E
- Date: 10–11 February 2019
- Target: Fulani and Adara civilians
- Attack type: shootings
- Weapon: guns
- Deaths: 141
- Perpetrators: Fulani gunmen (suspected) and Adara militia
- Motive: Wipe out certain communities (ethnic cleansing) (VOA)

On 10–11 February 2019, 141 people were killed in the Kajuru LGA of the Nigerian state of Kaduna according to the state governor, hours before the Nigerian general election. The dead included 11 Adara people and 130 Fulani. However the Fulani group Miyetti Allah was reported to have published a list of 131 Fulani who had died and it also stated that the bodies of 66 Fulani were recovered while the bodies of 65 other Fulani remained missing. An attack by suspected Fulani gunmen on Ungwar Bardi killed 11 Adara people. An Adara militia in turn attacked Fulani settlements. Miyetti Allah later clarified 66 were buried in graves and 65 remained missing.

Some sources like the Christian Association of Nigeria, stated that the governor lied. The National Emergency Management Agency denied it. However, some of the graves in which the Fulani victims were buried were shown to the Premium Times.

Locals have claimed the attack began as part of revenge for clashes in October 2018 between Christians and Muslims in Kajuru which killed 55 people in total. Of the dead, 22 were children and another 11 were women. Violence around election time is fairly common in Nigeria. Hundreds were killed during post-election violence in 2011.

At least 29 people were reported to be killed in an attack in Karamai community of Kajuru on 26 February 2019. The attack was suspected to be from Fulani in retaliation to the earlier violence where Fulani settlements were attacked. The governor confirmed a few days later that the death toll had risen to 40.

The Coalition Against Kajuru killings stated on 18 March that since then 130 people have been killed in a series of revenge attacks over the massacre announced by El-Rufai.

== See also ==
- List of massacres in Nigeria
- 1992 Zangon Kataf crises
