= Fulani extremism in Nigeria =

Terrorist activity

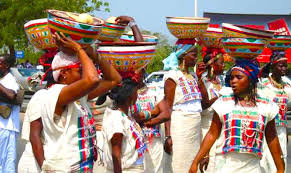
Fulani people

Fulani extremism refers to the use of terrorism tactics by Islamic extremist elements within the Fula people against non-Muslims as part of the Herder–farmer conflicts in Nigeria. Unlike other manifestations of Islamic extremism in Northern Nigeria, the terror tactics used in these conflicts have not been orchestrated by an organised terrorist group. Nigeria is considered a “melting pot” of different cultural and ethnic groups. Ethnic identification in the country is a complicated amalgamation of primordial and constructivist approaches.

== Background ==
The number of Fulani in Nigeria is estimated to be around 13 million. The primary ethnic groups that the Fulani come into conflict with are the Yoruba and the Igbo, although a total of 33 known groups participate in the herder–farmer conflicts in the country.

== General history ==
The Fulani are largely nomadic/semi-nomadic group of approximately 100 million individuals who live in the semi-arid climate of West Africa. The Fulani are a pastoralist group and their livelihood depends on herding cattle, and occasionally goats and sheep, along grazing routes. In recent years, as climate change has brought about increased desertification and a scarcity of resources, herder-farmer conflicts have increased in frequency. As Fulani nomads move southward into more fertile lands, there has been greater competition for grazing routes with local farmers, prompting violence.

While there are other kinds of herder-farmer conflicts in Nigeria, Herder-Farmer conflicts have been categorized as frequent conflicts and tactics are used to settle the disputes. In some parts of Africa, such as in Mali, formal terrorist groups have been established. The Macina Liberation Front, or the Front de Libération du Macina (FLM) in Mali is an official jihadist group that has become intertwined with the Fulani pastoralists. While there is currently no formal organization in Nigeria, terrorist tactics are still common. These tactics include, but are not limited to, destroying crops, deadly riots, blocking traffic, raping women, beating up farmers, and instigating armed attacks on villages. The battle for fertile farming land and grazing routes has resulted in a significant amount of violence. These crises also occur throughout Guinea, Senegal, Mali, and Cameroon. The religious conflicts arise with other non-Muslim tribes, even against other Fulani, such as the Fula Christians.

While the specific details of some Fulani migration into Nigeria are largely unknown, it is generally assumed that some of the Fulani moved into Northern Nigeria from the Senegambia region in the nineteenth century. Since this initial migration, the Fulani have come into conflict with farmers in Nigeria. The Herder-Farmer conflicts are most prominent in the Kaduna, Plateau, and Benue states.

Over the course of several centuries, these conflicts have fluctuated in intensity based on a variety of social, political, economic, and environmental factors. Specifically, droughts, erratic rainfall, and the degradation of land in Nigeria have intensified the conflict. The Sultan of Sokoto has emphasized that "not all Fulani herdsmen engage in terrorism" noting that while some bandits exist within the community, this is not representative of the whole group.

== Prominent attacks ==
There are attacks not consolidated under the rule of top-down leadership. Instead, attacks are operated on an individual, smaller-scale level, which are typical of terrorist groups. As a result, records of attacks and perpetrator identification remain incomplete.

The following are some prominent attacks in Nigeria:

Date	Location	Attack Type	Fatalities
3/5/2015	Egba	Firearms	95
2/24/2016	Abugbe	Armed Assault	51
2/24/2016	Aila	Armed Assault	50
2/24/2016	Akwu	Armed Assault	50
2/24/2016	Ugboju	Armed Assault	50
6/18/2016	Logo District	Armed Assault	59
3/20/2017	Zaki Biam	Armed Assault	73
5/5/2018	Gwaska	Facility/Infrastructure Attack	58
9/3/2018	Bolki	Facility/Infrastructure Attack	35

== Statistics ==
- In 2018, the Herder-Farmer conflicts were responsible for 72% of deaths in Nigeria. The total death toll was 1,159 deaths.
- In 2019, just one year later, Herder-Farmer conflicts were responsible for only 26% of deaths in Nigeria, accounting for 325 deaths.
- Between the years 2010 and 2016, these conflicts were responsible for 3,068 deaths across several West-African countries.
- In 2014, more than 1,200 people lost their lives. This made the Herder-Farmer conflicts the world's fourth deadliest conflicts group.

=== Nigerian Grazing Reserve Act of 1964 ===
In 1964, the government passed this act, hoping that it would encourage the Fulani to adopt sedentary lifestyles and graze on these reserved lands.

=== Land Use Act of 1978 ===
In 1978, the government implemented the Land Use Act. This piece of legislation empowered the federal government to allocate land to different groups. Additionally, indigenous groups were granted the right to claim ownership of ancestral territories. The passage of the Land Use Act exacerbated the Fulani-farmer conflict, as the nomadic Fulani were largely excluded from the right to claim ownership of ancestral land.

=== Nigerian Agricultural Policy of 1988 ===
In an attempt to resolve the issues presented by the Land Use Act, the government has demarcated specific grazing reserves with the Nigerian Agricultural Policy. This law set aside a minimum 10% of the total territory of the country to be reserved for grazing. To date, this mandate has not been enforced to its fullest capacity.

== Effects of conflict ==
=== Reduced crop yield ===
The constant conflict between the pastoralists and the farmers has had a negative effect on both the herder and the farmer output. Both indiscriminately destroy the crops and the cattle negatively affecting agricultural production.

=== Displacement of farmers ===
Both the Farmers and the Herders are displaced by this conflict, exacerbating poverty and disorder in the agricultural regions.

== See also ==
- Herder–farmer conflicts in Nigeria
