= Nomadic conflict =

Environmental conflict between farmers and herders

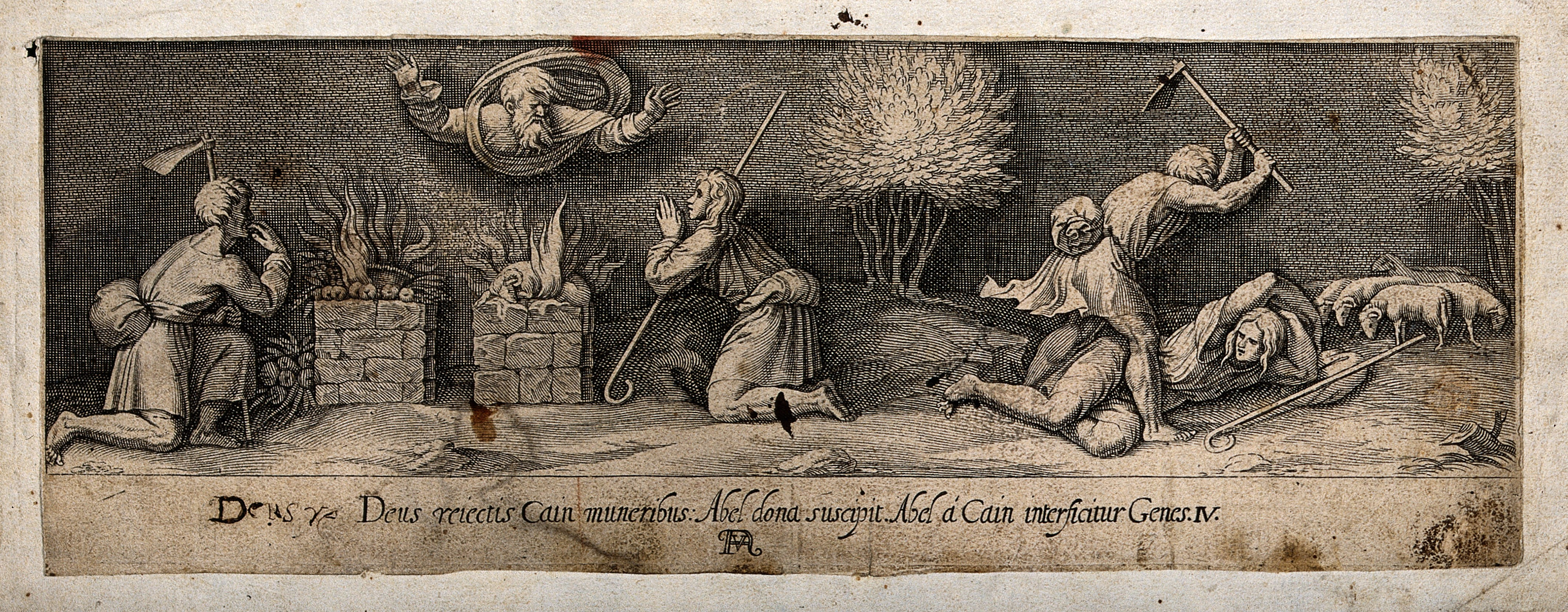
Cain and Abel: Cain, the farmer, sacrifices crops to Yahweh; Abel, the herdsman, sacrifices an animal. Yahweh is pleased by Abel's sacrifice; Cain murders Abel out of jealousy. The story is seen as an allegory for ancient farmer-herder conflicts.

Nomadic conflict, also called farmer–herder conflict, is a type of environmental conflict where farming and herding communities overlap and has been used to refer to fighting among herding communities or fighting between herding and farming communities. This is sometimes referred to as conflict involving "pastoralists" or "nomadic" people and "agriculturalists" or "settled" people. The conflicts usually arise from destruction of crops by livestock and is exacerbated during times when water and lands to graze are scarce.

== Background ==
There are several hundred million pastoralists worldwide and Africa contains about 268 million pastoralists, over a quarter of its population, who live on about 43 percent of the continent's land mass.

=== Commercial displacement ===
Displacement of local communities to make way for commercial farms or mining activities has put pressure on grazing areas, exacerbating conflict.

=== Climate change and land degradation ===
Desertification in the Sahel, where much of the present-day conflicts between herders and farmers take place, is expanding southward by about 1400 square miles a year. Climate change has apparently exacerbated land degradation, which leads to more competition over grazing areas.

== History ==
Malti Malik summarises relationships and inter-dependencies between sheep-herders and sedentary farmers in Mari, a city-state on the Euphrates (in present-day Syria) which flourished between 2900 and 1759 BCE. The "nomadic groups included the Akkadians, Amorites, Assyrians and Aramaeans. [...] Some of them gained much power and succeeded in establishing their own rule. For example, the kings of Mari were Amorites." Interactions included trade and employment (as harvest workers or hired soldiers) as well as "robbing and plundering".

== Examples ==
=== Bolivia ===
The colonization and incorporation to the Bolivian state of the lands of the Ava Guarani people from the 1850s to the early 20th century had aspects of a farmer–herder conflict. Non-indigenous settlement in eastern Chuquisaca was motivated by an expansion of cattle ranching contributing to a conflict between settlers and the maize-farming Ava Guaraní to assume aspects of a farmer–herder conflict.

=== Cameroon ===
More than 30,000 people in northern Cameroon fled to Chad after ethnic clashes over access to water between Musgum fishermen and ethnic Arab Choa herders in December 2021.

=== Central African Republic ===
In the Central African Republic Civil War, a large portion of the fighting was between rebel groups known as ex-Séléka and rebel groups known as anti-balaka. While the ex-Séléka consisted of those who were largely Muslim and the anti-balaka consisted of those who were largely Christian and animist, an added dimension of the conflict was that ex-Séléka consisted of those from nomadic groups, such as the Fulani, Gula and Runga, and the anti-balaka consisted of those from agriculturalist groups.

=== Congo, Democratic Republic of ===
Ethnic conflict in Kivu has often involved the Congolese Tutsis known as Banyamulenge, a cattle herding group that largely migrated from Rwanda in the 19th century and are often derided as outsiders. They are pitted against other ethnic groups who consider themselves indigenous. Militias drawn from the Bembe, Bafuliru and Banyindu have attacked and stolen cattle from the Banyamulenge.

=== Kenya ===
The northern Kenya region is a very insecure area. For years now, there has been a number of cattle raids going on, terrorising the civilian population and killing hundreds of people.

=== Nigeria ===
Across Nigeria, there are a series of disputes over arable land between Fulani herders and non-Fulani farmers. The conflicts have been especially prominent in the Middle Belt (North Central) since the return of democracy in 1999. More recently, they have deteriorated into attacks on farmers by Fulani herders.

Attacks have also taken place in Northwestern Nigeria against farmers who are mainly Hausa, who are almost entirely Muslim. Many Fulani communities, who are usually farmers, have also been attacked and raided by Fulani bandits and other militias. The conflict has taken on religious and ethnic dimensions: many of the farmers are Christians of various ethnicities while most of the herders are Muslim Fulani. Thousands of people have died since the attacks began. Sedentary farming in rural communities are often targets of attacks because of their vulnerability. There are fears that the conflict will spread to other West African countries, but that has often been downplayed by governments in the region. Attacks on herders have also led them to retaliating by attacking other communities.

=== Rwanda ===
The later lands of Rwanda were originally inhabited by the Twa, who largely lived as hunters, gatherers, and potters. Hutu people migrated to the area around 1000 and engaged in farming. They also developed a political system based upon highly centralized governance and created a number of principalities. Waves of cattle-raising Tutsi moved south into the region from the fifteenth to sixteenth centuries. A series of villages in the northeastern part of the country came to be governed by Tutsi chiefs whose warriors and attendants competed for lands. In general, the different Hutu and Tutsi groups which cleared forested areas in Rwanda subsequently claimed a heritable ownership of this land, resulting in the development of lineage claims to certain territories (dubbed ubukonde). Lineage members traditionally maintained autonomy in their respective territories, limiting the early power of the developing statelets inside Rwanda.

=== Sudan and South Sudan ===
Sudanese nomadic conflicts are non-state conflicts between rival nomadic tribes in Sudan and South Sudan. These conflicts are common and typically arise over scarce resources such as grazing land, cattle, and drinking water. Tribes involved in these clashes include the Messiria, Maalia, Rizeigat and Bani Hussein Arabic tribes inhabiting Darfur and West Kordofan, as well as the Dinka, Nuer and Murle African ethnic groups inhabiting South Sudan. The conflicts have been intensified by broader wars in the region, particularly the Second Sudanese Civil War, the War in Darfur and the Sudanese conflict in South Kordofan and Blue Nile.

Over the years, clashes between rival ethnic militias have caused significant casualties and displaced hundreds of thousands of people. Notable violent incidents include:

- 1993: between Jikany Nuer and Lou Nuer in Upper Nile;
- 2009–2012: clashes between Lou Nuer and Murle in Jonglei;
- 2013–2014: conflict involving the Maalia, Rizeigat, Messiria, Salamat and Bani Hussein in Darfur and West Kordofan.

Nomadic conflict in Sudan has been a part of the Second Sudanese Civil War, the War in Darfur and the Sudanese conflict in South Kordofan and Blue Nile and has been a feature in ethnic violence in South Sudan.

== Bibliography ==
- Des Forges, Alison (2011). Defeat Is the Only Bad News: Rwanda under Musinga, 1896–1931. Madison, Wisconsin: University of Wisconsin Press. ISBN 978-0299281441.
- Dorsey, Learthen (1994). Historical Dictionary of Rwanda (1st ed.). Metuchen, New Jersey: Scarecrow Press. ISBN 978-0-8108-2820-9.
- Tapia Matamala, Orlando; Prieto Serrano, Carla (2023). "Colonización y resistencia chiriguana: la conquista del cañón Abatiri, provincia de Azero, sureste de Bolivia (1850-1890)". In Harambour, Alberto; Serje, Margarita (eds.). La Era del Imperio y las Fronteras de la Civilización en América del sur (in Spanish). Bogotá-Santiago: Ediciones UniAndes-Pehuén. pp. 339–364. ISBN 9789587985108.
- O., R. (1963). "Rwanda Re-Examined". The Journal of African History. 4 (2). Cambridge, Cambridgeshire: Cambridge University Press: 298–300. ISSN 0021-8537. JSTOR 179545. OCLC 5548892882.
- Tuttle, Kate (2010). "Rwanda". In Gates Jr., Henry Louis; Appiah, Kwame Anthony (eds.). Encyclopedia of Africa. Oxford, Oxfordshire: Oxford University Press. doi:10.1093/acref/9780195337709.001.0001. ISBN 978-0-19-533770-9.
- Uvin, Peter (April 1999). "Ethnicity and Power in Burundi and Rwanda: Different Paths to Mass Violence". Comparative Politics. 31 (3). New York, New York: City University of New York: 253–271. doi:10.2307/422339. ISSN 0010-4159. JSTOR 422339. OCLC 205554027. PMID 20120547.
