= Killings in Missong =

2022 mass killings in Cameroon

- Part of the Anglophone Crisis
- Location: Missong, Cameroon
- Date: June 1, 2022
- Deaths: 9
- Injuries: 1
- Perpetrator: Soldiers of the 53rd Motorized Infantry Battalion

On 1 June 2022, Cameroonian soldiers of the 53rd Motorized Infantry Battalion killed nine civilians in the village of Missong, Northwest Region during the Anglophone Crisis.

A Human Rights Watch report after the killings found that nine civilians in Missong (a settlement in Zhoa, Fungom District) had been killed by the military, relying on testimony from five eyewitnesses and a village elder, describing it as "a reprisal operation against a community suspected of harboring separatist fighters."

A few days after the HRW report was published, military spokesman Cyrille Serge Atonfack Guemo published a federal enquiry into the action. The statement found that the soldiers were conducting a search for a missing soldier when they were confronted by a group of angry residents. According to a government enquiry the soldiers responded in a "inappropriate" and "manifestly disproportionate" manner by murdering four men, four women and an 18-month-old girl. A one-year-old child was lightly wounded and transferred to the hospital.

The federal enquiry and admission by the army was among the first of its kind by the army during the Anglophone Crisis, and welcomed as "a positive step" by Human Rights Watch.

== See also ==
- Ngarbuh massacre
