= Obagaji =

Coordinates: 7°53′30″N 7°54′34″E

- Obagaji
- Interactive map of Obagaji
- Time zone: UTC+1 (WAT)

Obagaji is a town and headquarters of Agatu Local Government Area, Benue State, Nigeria.

== Climate/geography ==
From February 4 to April 17, the hot season, which has an average daily high temperature exceeding 34 °C (93 °F), lasts for 2.4 months. With an average high of 35 °C (95 °F) and low of 24 °C (75 °F), March is the hottest month of the year in Obagaji.

The 4.0-month cool season, which runs from June 22 to October 24, has an average daily high temperature of less than 30 °C (86 °F). With an average low of 18 °C (65 °F) and a high of 31 °C (88 °F), December is the coldest month of the year in Obagaji.

Daily highs hover around 29 °C (84 °F), rarely dropping below 27 °C (81 °F) or rising over 31 °C (87 °F). On August 18, the daily maximum temperature is at its lowest, 29 °C (84 °F).

Daily lows hover around 23 °C (73 °F), rarely dropping below 22 °C (71 °F) or rising over 23 °C (74 °F). On August 8, the lowest daily average low temperature is 23 °C (73 °F).

In Obagaji, temperatures normally vary from 24 °C (75 °F) to 35 °C (95 °F) on March 16, the hottest day of the year, and from 18 °C (64 °F) to 32 °C (89 °F) on December 31, the coldest day of the year.
