= Fulani extremism =

Ethnic conflicts involving the Fulani people of West Africa

Ethnic conflicts involving the Fulani people (also known as Fula) occur in West Africa, primarily in Nigeria, but also in Mali, Cameroon, the Democratic Republic of Congo, and the Central African Republic, due to conflicts over land and culture. The death count for each attack is small, although the cumulative death count is in the thousands.

== History ==
=== Conflict between farmers and herders ===
The Fulani are largely nomadic/semi-nomadic and live in the semi-arid climate of West Africa. Due to population growth and desertification, Fulani nomads have to move south towards more fertile lands to graze their herds. This created conflicts with the farmers. This resulting violence left a death toll of over 10,000.

These conflicts are being framed as an ethno-religious conflict despite a considerable number of Fulani herdsmen not being Muslim or practicing Muslims. Peaceful Fulani communities have also been attacked and raided by bandits including Fulani militias. Millions of Fulani communities also suffer from stigmatisation and discrimination as they are blamed for the crimes of a few thousand Fulanis.

== Attacks ==
=== Nigeria ===
Nigeria experienced the most attacks. January 2018 marked a five year high in the number of events associated with Herder-Farmer conflicts in Nigeria. In 2018, 1,868 fatalities have been attributed to Herder-Farmer conflicts involving (both the farmers and the herders in conflicts instigated by the two bodies on attacks on its members). In just January 2018, there were 91 violent events associated with the conflicts, resulting in a reported 302 fatalities. However, these conflicts are not so easily classified. The majority of the violence occurring as a part of these conflicts revolves around disagreements between pastoralists and farming communities, which is why many describe the conflicts as farmer-herder conflict. The majority of Fulani in Nigeria are Muslim, leading some to describe the violence as a religious conflict

Most of the Herder-Farmer conflicts are typically carried out with firearms, although bombs and kidnapping are also used. The escalated conflicts mostly target private property followed by government buildings, businesses and religious institutions.

=== Mali ===
Fulani has had much influence in Mali. In 2012, the Malian government was overthrown by Amadou Sanogo. Although tension between the Christian south and the Muslim north was already present, the coup weakened the country and allowed terrorism to rise.

Several Liberation groups have risen in Mali. The Macina Liberation Front (FLM) formed in 2015, and committed 29 attacks with at least 129 casualties. Another group is the National Alliance for the Protection and the Restoration of Justice (ANSIPRJ). This group carried out one attack in 2016 that killed 17 and injured 35.

Malian groups targeted state facilities rather than private property. A majority of the attacks were done with firearms.

Efforts to reduce this conflicts were aided by France, Mali's former colonizer, which sent military aid and assistance. The aid was largely to counter the rise in terror. The United States supported France in this effort. The United Nations sent peacekeeping troops to Mali. However, the peacekeeping troops became a target.

=== Central African Republic ===
As of April 2019, fourteen attacks had occurred in the Central African Republic. The main target was private property. The weapon of choice is a firearm.

=== Democratic Republic of Congo ===
As of April 2019, one attack had occurred in the Democratic Republic of Congo. On the 26th of March, 2016, there was an attack on a military base in Ngaliema. The attackers injured a soldier, but the attack cost them three of their own men.

=== Cameroon ===
In February 2020, there was a massacre in Ngarbuh carried out by Fulani extremists alongside Cameroonian soldiers during the Anglophone Crisis.
