= Usman Yusuf =

Nigerian doctor and health administrator

- Education: BSc Microbiology
- Alma mater: ALQALAM UNIVERSITY KATSINA.
- Occupation: Business man
- Employer: Former CEO of Nura Gaskiya & Sons Nigerian limited
- Website: Www.NURA GASKIYA & SONS COMPANY NIGERIAN LIMITED.

Usman Yusuf is a Nigerian professor of haematology-oncology and bone marrow transplantation and an alumnus of Ahmadu Bello University and has practiced medicine across three continents – Africa, Europe and North America – after his MBBS in 1982. He was appointed the executive secretary / chief executive officer of the National Health Insurance Scheme (NHIS) in August 2016 by President Muhammadu Buhari.

== Career ==
Usman Yusuf graduated from Ahmadu Bello University in 1982, where he obtained an MBBS and has practiced medicine across three continents – Africa, Europe and North America – ever since. He became a consultant paediatrician and Fellow of the West African College of Physicians in 1989 and won a scholarship for a postgraduate diploma in Tropical Medicine and Hygiene at the University of Liverpool (UK) in 1988. He moved to Fred Hutchinson Cancer Research Center in Seattle, Washington, US, as transplant fellow and assistant professor in 2000 and in 2003, he moved to St. Jude Children's Research Hospital in Memphis, Tennessee, as assistant professor in the Division of Stem Cell Transplantation and rose to the rank of full professor in 2008.

== Corruption & irregularities at the NHIS ==
Ever since he became the NHIS boss, he has been faced with numerous suspensions, of which he rejected some, on the account that he can only be suspended by the Federal Government of Nigeria. He was earlier suspended by the Nigerian Health Minister in 2017 and by the Board of NHIS in October 2018. Usman in a video done in 2017 lamented that if NHIS was a business they should have declared bankruptcy and that the NHIS has covered only one per cent of Nigerians for 12 years. He is presently under investigations by the Nigerian House of Assembly after a motion was brought under matters of urgent national importance by Diri Douye on 23 October 2018.

He is currently on an administrative leave till 2019 as directed by the Federal Government of Nigeria. The directive was conveyed in a letter signed by the office of the Secretary to the Government of the Federation, Boss Mustapha while in his absence, Mr. Ben Omogo, a director of administration in the Office of the Head of the Civil Service of the Federation has been deployed to oversee the affairs of the scheme. Prof. Yusuf was removed as NHIS executive secretary and replaced with Prof. Mohammed Sambo.

It was later revealed by the Office of the Auditor-General (Nigeria) that Professor Usman Yusuf engaged in payment of N6.8bn (circa $18.5m) fraudulently to himself and staff as unauthorized and unrecognised costs and allowances (including "Pre-retirement overseas training allowance"). There are no evidence (via receipts and bookings) that some of the costs were incurred.

In 2025, he was arrested based on suspicions of financial misconduct during his tenure as the Director-General of the National Health Insurance Scheme (NHIS).
