= Agatu massacres =

Agatu massacre
- Part of Herder–farmer conflicts in Nigeria
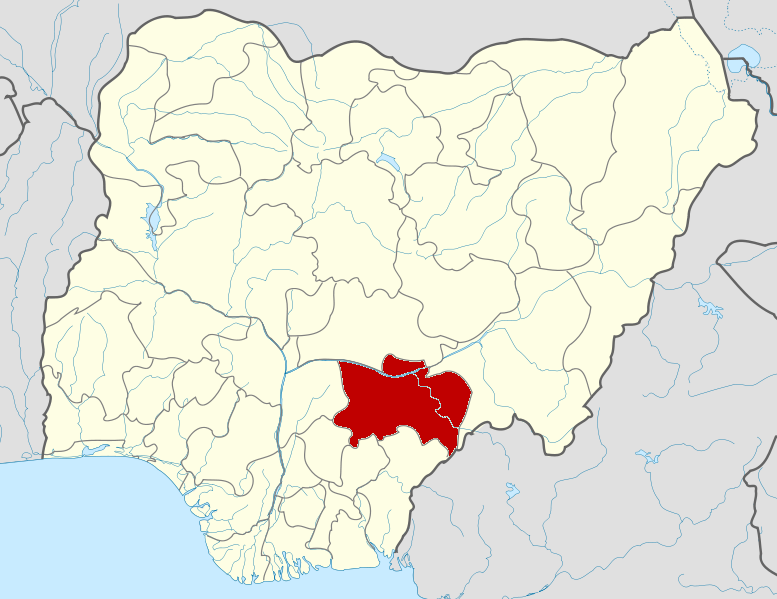
- Location of Benue State in Nigeria
- Location: Agatu, Benue State, Nigeria
- Date: February - March 2016
- Attack type: Massacre
- Deaths: 300-500
- Victim: Several thousand (at least 7000 displaced)

The Agatu attacks and massacres occurred in Agatu, Benue State, began in late February 2016 and continued for several days into March.

== Background ==
Agatu is in the State of Benue close to Nigeria's centre, where several different ethnic groups meet.

=== Possible motives and causes ===
It is believed that the attack was committed in retaliation for the killing of the Fulanis' cows.

Former Senate President David Mark also pointed out that the Benue South senatorial district were his constituents and hinted at a possible political motivation for these attacks.

== Aftermath ==
According to the Nigerian politician Senator David Mark, over 500 people have been killed. However, this number has been disputed. The Inspector General of Police (IGP) said as reported by Punch Nigeria newspaper that "I was around, I travelled to Benue State, I did not see where 300 people were buried."

Afterwards, several small scale attacks continued through Benue State and central Nigeria.

Senator Mark later claimed he was fortunate to escape an ambush by suspected assailants, on a condolence visit to the area.

President Buhari and members of the Nigerian security apparatus were criticised for their handling of the situation.

== 2018 ==
Tragedy struck again on 4 March 2018 in Omusu village, Ojigo ward in Edumoga, Okpokwu local government area of Benue State as suspected herdsmen unleashed terror on their victims leaving 26 people, including women and children, dead just a day after president Muhammad Buhari promised to visit the state.

== See also ==
- Nimbo massacre
