= Nimbo massacre =

- Location in Nigeria
- Coordinates: 6°45′N 7°12′E
- Time zone: UTC+

Nimbo is a border town in Uzo-Uwani area of Enugu State, Nigeria, where seven villages- Ekwuru, Nimbo-Ngwoko, Ugwuijoro, Ebor, Enugu-Nimbo, Umuome and Ugwuachara were invaded, and scores massacred by over 500 armed Fulani herdsmen, rated the fourth deadliest terror group in the world, in the early hours of April 25, 2016. Uzo Uwani has boundaries with the Southern States of Ebonyi and Anambra, and Central States of Benue and Kogi, where these attacks have increased lately.

== Attack ==
The herdsmen reportedly planned to occupy part of the farming community's land for cattle grazing and warned residents of an impending attack on April 23, 2016. The intelligence was promptly reported to security agencies who met accordingly. However, at about 5.15 am on April 25, 2016, the armed herdsmen numbering over 500 struck killing 40 people. The following day, April 26, 2016, six more bodies were recovered and 14 victims were lying critically ill at Royal Cross Hospital, Nsukka, Nsukka District General Hospital and Bishop Shanahan Hospital, Nsukka.

During the raid, a church, known as Christ Holy Church International (AKA Odozi-Obodo), at Onu-Eke, and 11 houses were burnt by the marauders. As a result of the insecurity, displaced natives fled to neighboring communities of Nkpologu and Uvuru, (Uvuru-Agada) even as indigenes of those communities also fled to Nsukka in fear of further attacks.

Invasion of Ukpabi-Nimbo community, known as "Enugu Massacre", by roaming Fulani herdsmen followed similar massacre of hundreds of natives in another farming community, Agatu, Benue State by the same herdsmen, just a little over a month.

There was invasion of neighbouring Abbi, another Uzo Uwani community, where a brother and sister-Fidelis and Mercy Okeja were reportedly killed on the spot earlier in February 2016. 19 persons were declared missing whilst seven houses and motorcycles were raised down. It was reported the invasion was carried out by 30 masked Fulani herdsmen.

== Compromised Security ==
According to Enugu State governor, Ifeanyi Ugwuanyi, the terrorism at Nimbo may have happened due to inability of security agencies to successfully act on the counter intelligence report about herdsmen grouping at neighbouring Odolu in Kogi State in preparation for attack.

Igbo social cultural organisation, Ohanaeze Ndigbo whilst expressing disappointment at the seemingly security lapses which led to the terror attack and likelihood of another attack, asked the government to carry out thorough investigation to bring those responsible to justice and forestall further occurrences. The body also said “Imeobi views with grave concern and unequivocally, condemns the recent slaughter by Fulani herdsmen of our defenceless kith and kin in Nimbo, Uzo-Uwani Local Government Area of Enugu State.”

== Herdsmen and Communities ==
Roaming herdsmen have reportedly terrorised, occupied lands, raped, kidnapped, and killed hundreds of people across the farming communities of southern and north central states in 2016, a bloody conflict Nigeria’s information minister, Lai Mohammed said the government was working behind the scenes to resolve. Besides loss of human lives, it is estimated the bloody conflicts cost the West African country billions in lost revenues. "Our men were supported by soldiers and they prevented the attackers from coming to the centre of the community. The attack took place at the fringe of the town and my men engaged the attackers in a shoot-out and prevented them from coming to the centre of the town which was their target", reported the Enugu State Commissioner of Police, Nwodibo Ekechukwu.

Some of the high-profile kidnap cases associated to herdsmen include that of chief Olu Falae, who was traced to, kidnapped at his farm in Ilado, Ondo State, and the January 5, 2016 abduction of slain traditional ruler of Ubulu-Uku community, Obi Agbogidi Akaeze Ofulue of Aniocha South, Delta State, by gunmen and ransom demanded. "Though my phone number was used for negotiation of the ransom and a large amount of the ransom collected was also found on me. What happened was that, one of my friends known as Idris, who I met two months ago came to my house few days before the last Sallah celebration and took one of my SIM cards", answered Dojijo who was described as the leader of Chief Olu Falae's abduction operation.

Total casualties attributed to roaming Fulani herdsmen, due to their reluctance to, invest in private cattle ranches or agricultural holding and, improve Social responsibility amongst the communities, hit 1,229 in 2014, a massive increase from just 63 in 2013, according to the Institute for Economics and Peace’s Global Terrorism Index 2015 and it has soared since the beginning of 2016.

“These herdsmen must be called to order, these wanton destructions, audacious incursions in other people territory cannot continue for too long,” remarked Ondo State governor, Dr. Olusegun Mimiko.

== Public Perception ==
There is a perception down the south and north-central regions of Nigeria, that federal government's silence, to killing of natives and farmers in their farm lands, continued open grazing of cattle by herdsmen known for their violence, and the rumoured bill to introduce grazing routes to encourage further roaming of herdsmen across Nigeria, are signs of failure, imperialism and favoritism by the President, Muhammadu Buhari to his tribesmen, the Fulani, over other ethnic nationalities of Nigeria.

Many have wondered why the President and security forces cracking down heavily and loudly on pro-Biafra activists and oil militants in the creeks are showing reluctance and working "behind the scenes" on herdsmen bloody conflicts with communities across Nigeria. According to the Yoruba social-cultural organisation, Afenifere, it was worried that Nigeria's secret police, DSS, which rushed to the press to say that they discovered a grave in the East of Nigeria where they said they found the bodies of the Fulani men without any DNA, has continued to maintain silence over killings across the country by certain ethnic group.

“I feel bitter, I feel aggrieved. I feel sad that APC government at the centre cannot protect us. We call on the Federal Government to declare state of emergency in Igboland over the Fulani herdsmen threat to security in the zone or else we will declare war against the Fulani Herdsmen", remarked the Archbishop of the Anglican Communion, Enugu Province, Most Rev. Dr. Emmanuel Chukwuma. The Rev warned that, if nothing was done to checkmate the Fulani herdsmen, he would personally ask the pro-Biafra groups to declare war on them as part of their Fundamental rights to Self-defense.

Indigenous People of Biafra has said the increasing attacks are aiding the fulfilment of predictions of its incarcerated leader, Nnamdi Kanu, whose popularity has soared following the terror attacks, about propagation of Hausa/Fulani supremacy and Islamization of Eastern Nigeria. "No, they are coming to enthrone Hausa/Fulani supremacy, to reposition the security agencies by sacking all competent hands and replace them with their kinsmen in order to drive their ethnic domination of the south. The Fulani herdsmen will be armed and encouraged to slaughter us with impunity and their masters will protect them, remarked Kanu before his arrest.

“The itinerant herdsmen are Fulani. They are killing and maiming innocent people. The silence by the Federal Government is alarming. I hope there is no extra constitutional agenda to this", remarked Ijaw Council for Human Rights, ICHR” whilst debunking the Northern Governors position that Fulani herdsmen should not be labelled criminals despite these wicked, lawless and provocative acts.

== Opposition to Grazing Reserve and Routes ==
"I hear there is a bill in the Senate seeking to create grazing routes, where are they grazing to, to another man’s farm”. Creating grazing routes is not the solution as it is known worldwide that cows kept in ranches produce better than grazing cows", remarked Audu Ogbe, Nigeria's Minister of Agriculture and Rural Development.

According to Obi Nwakanma, "aggressive Nomadism must not be allowed to become an avenue for ethnic expansionism and conquest of citizens protected by the constitution of the Federal Republic of Nigeria".

Ohanaeze Ndigbo, while opposing the creation of grazing routes and reserves, said cattle grazing is a private business and, therefore, should not be done in a manner that individual's or community's rights are infringed upon.

Re-echoing the position of many Nigerians, the Oyo State through its governor, Abiola Ajimobi, warned against any proposal to seize or allocate land across Nigeria for use as federal grazing reserves."It is against the Land Use Act; it is against the law of Natural justice to seize people’s land to cater for someone’s cattle."

Christian Association of Nigeria, CAN whilst viewing grazing reserve, route or right bill as a subtle way to Islamise Nigeria, like many Nigerians, said the best solution is private ownership of modern-day cattle ranches with access to veterinary services, schools, Irrigation/water supply and other social amenities.

The Deputy Senate President, Ike Ekweremadu, re-assured the public that National Assembly will not support the creation of grazing reserves anywhere in the country.
