= Agatu =

- LGA
- Interactive map of Agatu
- Coordinates: 7.9°N 7.9°E
- Country: Nigeria
- State: Benue State
- Headquarters: Obagaji

Government
  - Local Government Chairman and the Head of the Local Government Council: Hon. Joseph Ngbede

Area
  - Total: 1,065 km^{2} (411 sq mi)

Population (2022)
  - Total: 166,900
  - Density: 156.7/km^{2} (405.9/sq mi)
- Time zone: UTC+1 (WAT)

Agatu is a Local Government Area of Benue State, North Central Nigeria, created in 1996. It was formerly part of the Agatu district in the old Otukpo division. The headquarters of the local government is at Obagaji. Agatu is one of nine local government areas in the southern senatorial zone of Benue State, which is mainly occupied by the Idoma people. The majority of the resident population are farmers.

By the 1991 census, it has a population of about 80,000.

On 21 Jan 2014, 20 civilians and 5 soldiers were killed in an Agatu in an attack by Fulani herdsmen.

Agatu was the scene of more attacks over two years later, in 2016.

Agatu is home to notable individuals such as Hon. John Ngbede, Benue State Chairman of the People's Democratic Party (PDP); Hon. Samuel Odagboyi Godday, current member of the House of Representatives; Hon. Solomon Agidani, former member of the House of Representatives; Professor Isa Innocent Ekoja, the first professor from Agatu; and Pastor John Eliagwu Odogbo, the current Ochidoma of Idoma.

== Economy ==
The Agatu local government region is well known for its extensive cultivation of crops like yam, cassava, rice, beans, sorghum, and melons. In the Agatu local government area, minerals like kaolin, anhydride, and limestone are abundant.

== Geography ==
Agatu LGA's terrain is characterized by a scattering of highlands that run from east to west beside flat fertile regions. Additionally, the region's western portion is covered in dense forests.

== Climate condition ==
Agatu experiences a tropical wet and dry climate typical of Nigeria’s Middle Belt. The rainy season lasts from April to October with high humidity and frequent thunderstorms, while the dry season extends from November to March and is influenced by Harmattan winds. Average temperatures range from 22 °C (72 °F) to 34 °C (93 °F), and annual rainfall is typically between 1,200 mm (47 in) and 1,600 mm (63 in).

== Localities ==
Towns and Villages under Agatu Local Governments Area.

- Adagbo
- Aila
- Aiyeri
- Akwu
- Egba
- Enungba
- Ikpele
- Obagaji
- Odejo
- Odugbeho
- Ogam
- Ogbaulu
- Ogule
- Ogwule Ogbaulu
- Ogwule-Kaduna
- Okokolo
- Oshigbudu
- Sengev
- Usha
- Oweto
- Okpanchenyi
- Ekwo
- Egwuma
- Warri
- Okadu
- Olegetonu
- Ogwufa
- Sabo-garri

== See also ==
- List of villages in Benue State
