= Miyetti Allah =

Organization for cattle breeders in Nigeria

- Miyetti Allah Cattle Breeders Association of Nigeria
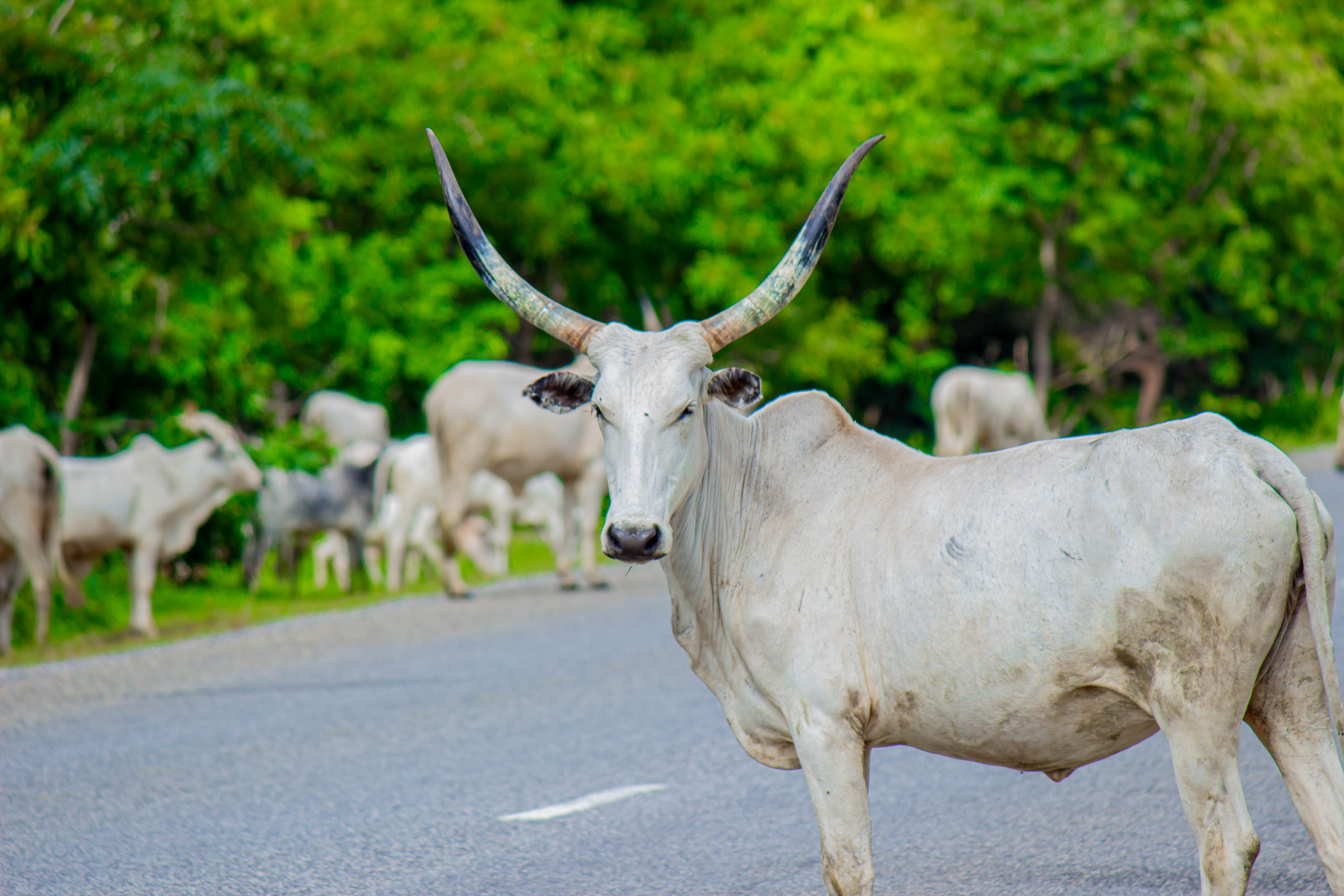
- Formation: 1979
- Founded at: Kaduna
- Purpose: Promoting the welfare of Fulani pastoralists
- Location: Kaduna, Nigeria
- Region served: Nigeria
- Official language: English and Fulfulde
- National President: Baba Othman Ngelzarma

Miyetti Allah Cattle Breeders Association of Nigeria (sometimes also called MACBAN) is a loose partisan advocacy group centered on promoting the welfare of Fulani pastoralists in Nigeria. The organization was founded in the early 1970s with headquarters in Kaduna. It became legally operational in 1979 and gained wider acceptance as an advocacy group in 1987.

MACBAN represents the interests of about 100,000 semi-nomads and nomads in the country.

== Name ==
Miyetti Allah means "I thank God" in Fulfulde.

== History ==
Official records of the early history of Miyetti Allah are sparse, the oral history is traced to 1960s by some members and by others to 1972 when the association was formed in Kaduna. The association's early members were largely dominated by settled Fulanis whose early concept of Miyetti Allah was to promote the welfare of all Fulanis through self help. In the 1970s, the organization was led by Muhammadu Sa'adu, with membership in Kaduna and Plateau States. Sa'adu, who was born in Jos but spent his adulthood in Kaduna, was a key figure in the campaigns to get new members to join.

Both Kaduna and Plateau states had local branches that were affiliated to local governments or communities, the meetings of the association were irregular and not all national or state level resolutions were adhered to. As the association expanded to more states, the aims of the association favored nomadic education and access to grazing reserves by cattle breeders.

Another organization, called Miyetti Allah Kautal Hore emerged in the late 2000s as a splinter from MACBAN. It is led by Bello Badejo and is a separate, socio-political organization. MACBAN has frequently sought to distance itself from Kautal Hore and has denounced it's violent statements.

Despite the best intentions of the organization, some Fulani communities have perceived Miyetti Allah as an ineffective government-aligned organization. As a result, some Fulani communities have become disillusioned with Miyetti Allah and resorted to forming their own vigilante groups.

== Mission ==
A major goal of MACBAN is to be the umbrella organization of Fulani herdsmen within the country. The activities of the organization involves liaising with the government on behalf of pastoralists, land use rights, nomadic education and conflict resolution between pastoralists and farmers. The group also supports protecting and increasing grazing reserves for cattle breeders in the country. However, not all pastoralists intend to stay within grazing reserves and the organization provides information to convince grazing reserve skeptics among the nomads to buy into the idea.

As the major promoter of welfare of Fulani pastoralists, increase in the farmer-herder conflicts and cattle rustling since 2011 have brought the known group into wider attention.

== Structure ==
The group's board of trustees is led by the Sultan of Sokoto who is the chairman of the board of trustees and the organization receives its funding from the organization membership fees, yearly dues by its members, other generating money activities and donors. The national chairman is elected every four years. When MACBAN was founded, it received support from Sultan Abubakar III, Aminu, the Emir of Zazzau, Usman Nagogo, the Emir of Katsina, and Ado Bayero, the late Emir of Kano. The emirs of these emirates compose a part of the group's board of trustees.

MACBAN has a national secretariat at Kaduna and state offices all over the nation.

== See also ==
- Herder–farmer conflicts in Nigeria
- Mass killings in Southern Kaduna
