= Middle Belt =

Geographical region in central Nigeria

Middle Belt Region Central Nigeria
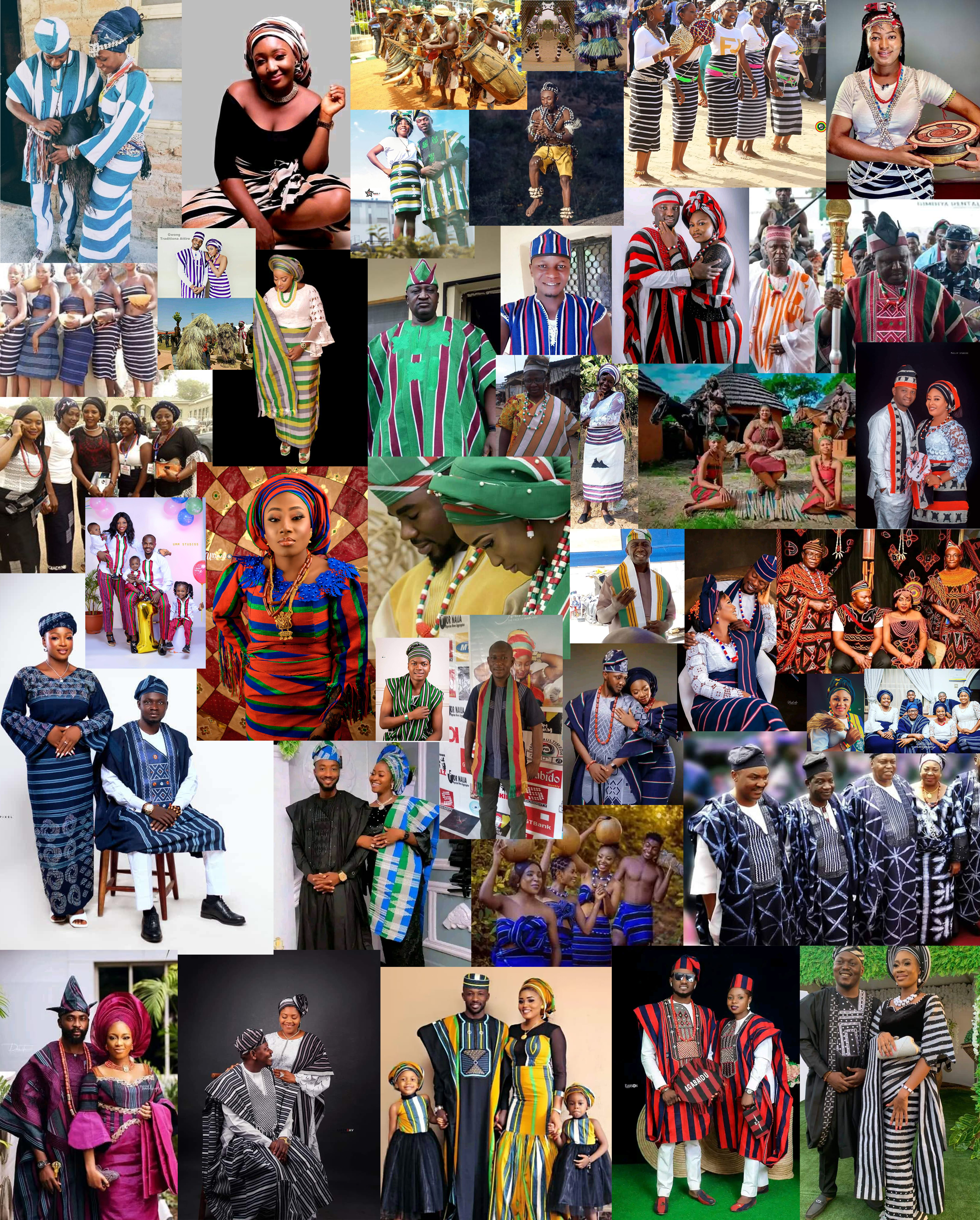
- Various cultures of the Middle Belt of Nigeria.
- Motto: Our Land, Our People, Our Heritage
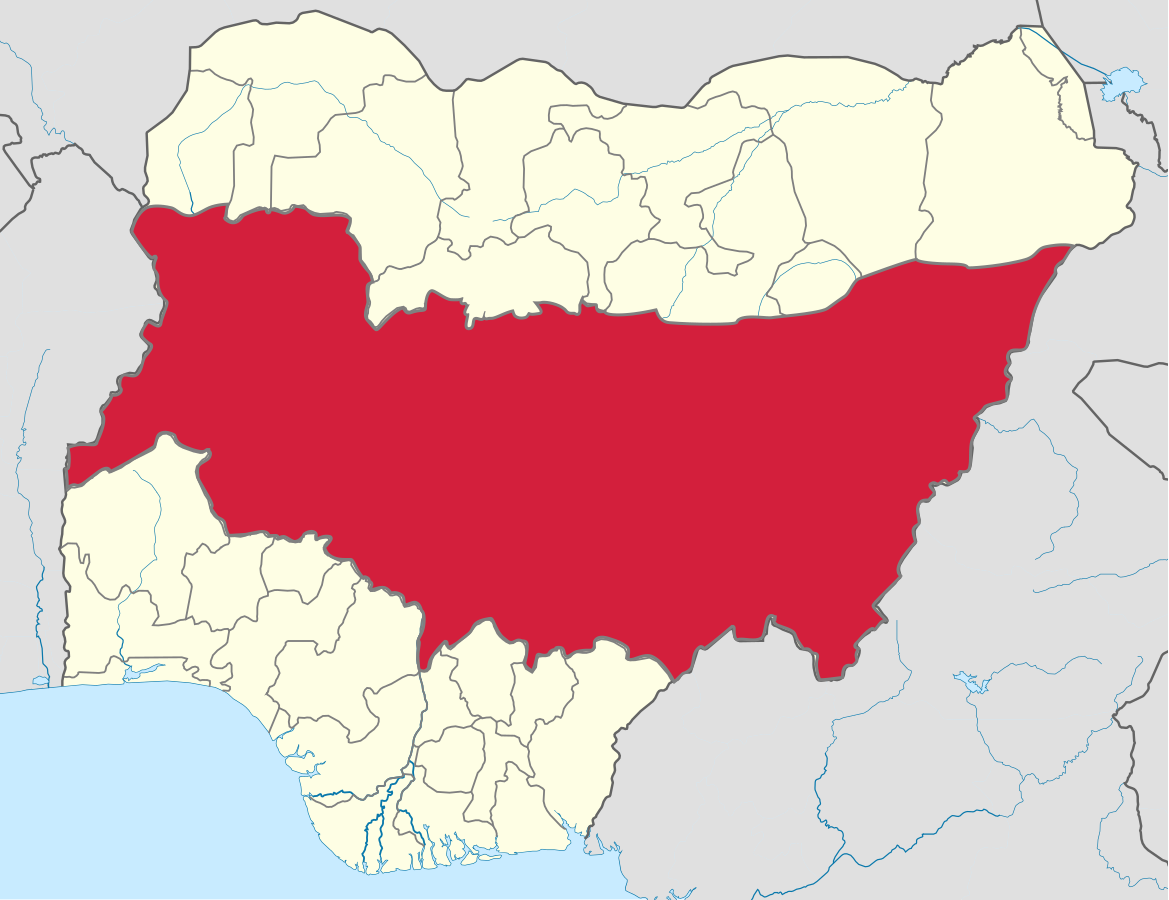

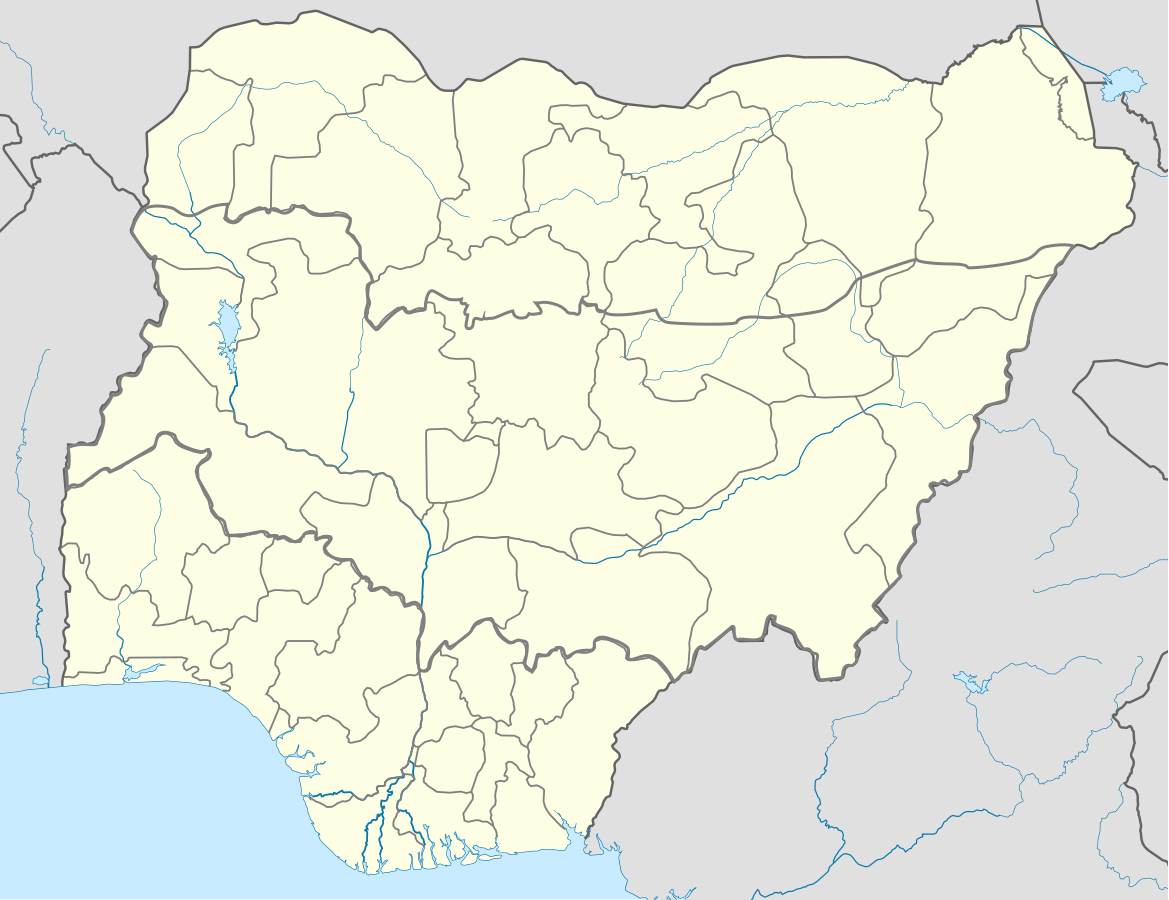
- Largest city: Abuja
- Official languages: English
- Major indigenous languages: Bole-Tangale languages; Biu-Mandara languages; Idomoid languages; Jukunoid languages; Kainji languages; Ngas languages; Nupoid languages; Plateau languages; Savannas languages; Tivoid languages; Yoruboid languages; Other languages, like Fulfulde, Hausa and Kanuri being culturally northern Nigerian
- Ethnic groups: Adara; Afizere; Akurmi; Atyap; Anaguta; Baatonum; Bachama; Bajju; Berom; Buji; Chamba; Dijim; Ebira; Eggon; Gbagyi-Gbari; Ham; Hun-Saare; Huba; Igede; Idoma; Igala; Jukun; Kamberi; Mambila; Marghi; Mumuye; Ngas; Mada; Nupe; Tangale; Tarok; Tiv; Yoruba (Okun); Zaar (Guus); Others: Bogghom, Gwong, Igbo, etc.; including northern groups like Fulani, Hausa and Kanuri.
- Religion: Christianity; Islam; Traditional Religion
- Demonym: Middle-Belter

Population
  - Estimate: 40,000,000

Middle Belt (also written Middle-Belt) or Central Nigeria is the region stretching across Nigeria longitudinally and forming a transition zone between Northern and Southern Nigeria. It is an informal term, not officially recognized by the federal government of Nigeria, being used in human geography. It is composed of the southern half of the defunct Northern Region of Nigeria, now comprising mostly the North Central and parts of the North East and North West geopolitical zones, and is characterised by its lack of a clear majority ethnic group. It is also the location of Nigeria's Federal Capital Territory.

Some scholars argue that the concept of the Middle Belt reflects not only a geographic region but also a religio-cultural coalition of minority groups in Northern Nigeria, many of whom are predominantly Christian and non-Hausa in origin.

The presence of many minority groups, to some degree, constitutes an ethno-linguistic barrier in the country and draws a separation between the principally Muslim North and the mainly Christian South. The region is a convergence of these cultural domains and maintains a tremendous degree of ethno-linguistic diversity. Afro-Asiatic, Nilo-Saharan, and Niger–Congo languages are all spoken, which are three African language families.

The earliest sources for the phrase seem to be in linguistics. Bernhard Struck's annotated bibliography uses the term for the belt of semi-Bantu languages (as they were then called). Soon after, in 1913, Northcote Thomas also uses the term in a discussion of the linguistic context. In the 1920s, it was described by Melzian (1928:496) as the "Middle Zone" although he seems to be using 'Zone' simply as a synonym for 'Belt'. Forde and Scott used the term in 1946: 180ff in a more geographical sense for Nigeria. The geographers Gleave and White generalised from Nigeria to West Africa and the Sahel in 1969.

== Overview ==
As to what the Middle-Belt entails, three top members of the Middle-Beltern struggle had this to say as presented in the pan-Middle-Beltern magazine, New Vision in December 2000:

The Middle-Belt true to its name, is located in central Nigeria, and interacting with both the North and the South with large population of both Northern and Southern peoples, the Middle-Belt is always in the best position to interpret the North to the South, and the South to the North... What the Middle-Belt seeks therefore, is to advance its former stand has been addressed as North Central Zone to self identification as Middle-Belt region, and widen the scope of the informal sector which to this day cements the platform of our national unity, so that our elite in the Middle-Belt behave in the spirit of national unity, as adequately and persistently demonstrated by the grassroot people over the years.

The veteran journalist, Chief Bayo Joseph, Media Consultant and Chairman, Editorial Board of the New Vision, on his own part said:

Since amalgamation of 1914, the people of the Middle-Belt have been held under dehumanizing conditions, they are treated as third rated citizen, little or no regard is accorded their culture and tradition, while their so-called masters wallowed in affluence enjoying the best of everything to the detriment of the Middle-Belter... Accordingly, these people from the Middle-Belt have the right to discontinue their association with those who enslave them and hold their destiny in their hands.

On another flash, Onesimus Enesi added that:

The people of the Middle-Belt are not in the North and cannot therefore be northerners...Since it pleases God to distinguish the people he created along geographic, racial, national, ethnic and language divide, it is equally good to identify and call them as such and this is the wisdom behind the struggle for a separate identity for the people of the Middle-Belt.

The definition of the Middle Belt areas are subject to great debate due to the presence of significant number of ethnic Hausa, Fulani, Kanuri and Igbo groups . In addition, the Yoruba who are the predominant ethnic group in Kwara and Kogi have a strong affinity with the larger Yoruba body and frequently prefer not to be associated with the Middle Belt identity.

== Politics ==
=== Territories ===
States of Nigeria which are generally referred to as belonging to the Middle Belt are: old Plateau (now Plateau and Nasarawa), old Gongola (now Adamawa and Taraba), Niger, Kwara, Kogi, Benue, the Federal Capital Territory, alongside Southern Kaduna, Southern Bauchi, Southern Kebbi, Southern Gombe, Southern Yobe State and Southern Borno, all culturally considered as part of the Middle Belt.

=== Agitations for a region ===
The yearnings for the creation of the Middle Belt region in Nigeria had been a burning issue, as even groups like the United Middle-Belt Youth Congress (UMYC) demand for a separate identity from the "North" by the creation of the Middle Belt region as a federal unit within Nigeria.

== Demographics ==
=== Population ===
The population of the Middle Belt as of 1991, was about 17.3 million but now predicted to be over 45 million people with the Christian population accounting for 45%, Muslims 45%, and Animists 10% of the total population.

=== Ethnolinguistic groups ===
The Middle Belt consists of many ethnic groups speaking over 230 languages. There is no dominant ethnic group, but among the larger groups as of 1991 are: Tiv with a population of 5.1 million and Nupe with 1.8 million people. These ethnic groups are represented by advocacy organizations such as CONAECDA.

=== Ethnoreligious conflicts ===
Minorities in Nigeria tend to be dominated by the three largest ethnic groups, the Hausa of the North, the Yoruba of the Southwest and the Igbo of the Southeast. Surrounded by divergent religious, economic, and cultural histories, the Middle Belt has been the melting pot where small and large ethno-religious groups in Nigeria have long coexisted, but where they have also increasingly collided over land, resources, identity and political power. The result is a mixture of recurring conflicts and occasional political unity and solidarity amongst these highly differentiated peoples. An example for the latter was the United Middle Belt Congress that emerged following Nigeria's independence from United Kingdom in 1960. In particular, Jos city in Plateau State has been a centre for ethno-religious disputes and violence since the 1990s. The Jos Forum Inter-Communal Dialogue process spanned 16 months from August 2013 - December 2014, and refers to a peace process undertaken by communities living in Jos that concluded in a "Declaration of Commitment to Peace". In 2018 violence escalated, with battles for scarce resources leading to over 500 deaths and 50 towns being destroyed. The clashes were largely between Muslim Fulani pastoralists and Christian Berom farmers. Over 300,000 people have been displaced by the violence.

== See also ==
- 1992 Zangon Kataf crises
- Agricultural sustainability in northern Nigeria
- CONAECDA, an organization representing indigenous ethnic groups in the Middle Belt
- Culture of Northern Nigeria
- Mass killings in Southern Kaduna
- Outline of the Middle Belt
- WikiProject Middle Belt
