= Fulani herdsmen =

Nomadic people in West Africa

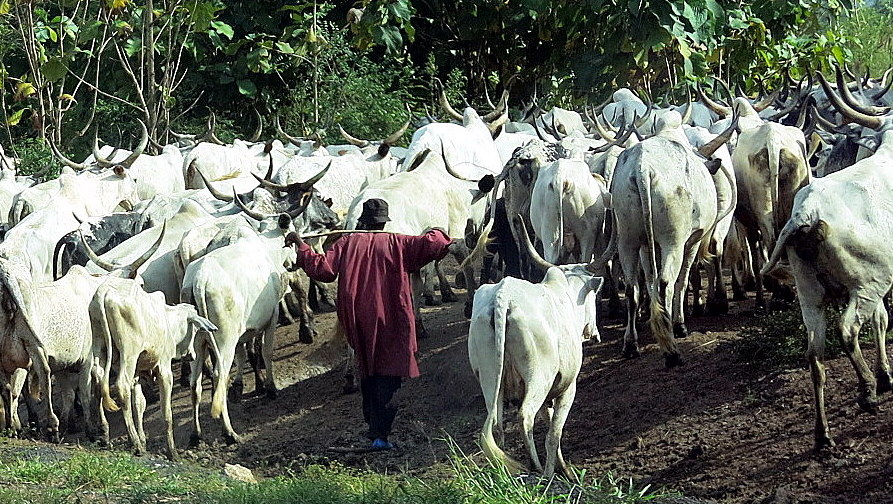
Fulbe herdsman in Togo

Fulbe herdsmen or Fulbe pastoralists are nomadic or semi-nomadic Fulbe people whose primary occupation is raising livestock. The Fulani herdsmen are largely located in the Sahel and semi-arid parts of Central Africa, West Africa, but due to relatively recent changes in climate patterns, many herdsmen have moved further south into the savannah and tropical forest belt of West Africa. The herdsmen are found in countries such as Nigeria, Niger, Senegal, Guinea, Mauritania, Mali, Burkina Faso, Ghana, Benin, Côte d'Ivoire, and Cameroon. In Senegal, they inhabit northeastern Ferlo and the southeastern part of the country. In some of these countries the Fulbe constitute a minority group.

== History ==
=== Herding system ===
A pastoral Fulbe family is the traditional herding unit. Tasks are divided by gender and age among the members of the family. The main work of men is to manage the herd, find grazing sites, build tents and camps, and make security tools such as knives, bows and arrows (or since the 1990's to buy or acquire modern firearms or machetes). Women in the unit take on traditional female gender roles such as sourcing food produce in the market, milking cows, weaving and mat-making. Some women are also involved in farming such as growing vegetables and raising poultry.

Cattle is the dominant component of the Fulani herd in countries such as Nigeria, and camel is the least-liked animal. Close to 60% of the herd is female; unwanted males are sold off.

=== Movements ===
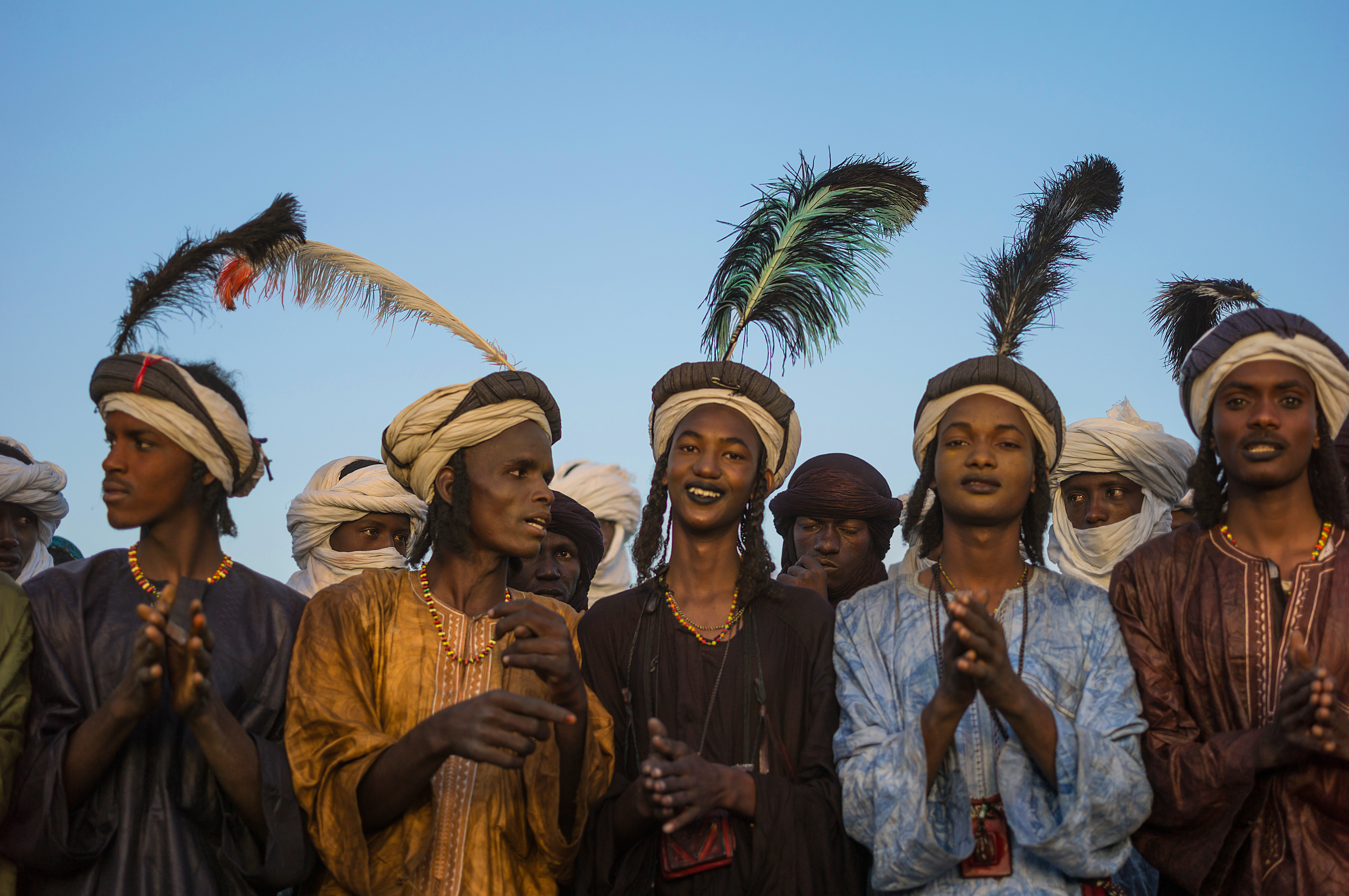
Wodeabe During Garewol

Fulbe herdsmen engage in both random and planned transhumance movements. Random movements are usually taken by the pure nomadic Fulbe herdsmen, while planned movements are taken by the semi-nomadic pastoralist. A primary reason for the migratory nature of the herdsmen is to reach areas with abundant grass and water for the cattle. The herdsmen also move to avoid tax collectors, harmful insects and hostile weather and social environment. A major benefit of the movement for the herdsmen is to maximize the availability of food resources for the cattle and reduce excessive grazing. Before moving to new areas, the herdsmen send a reconnaissance team to study the area for availability of resources such as grass and water.

== Source of income ==
The sale of goat, sheep and dairy products such as milk constitute the primary source of income and livelihood for the herdsmen. Their wealth and riches are often measured by the size of the cattle herd. Traditionally, the herdsmen often loan cows (habbanaya) to one another, and once the cow has birthed and weaned a calf it is returned to its original owner. These herdsmen herd several species of cattle, but the zebu cattle is the most common in the West African hinterland because of its drought-resistant traits. The dwarf N'Dama is commonly herded in the wetter areas of Fouta Djallon and Casamance as a result of their resistance to trypanosomiasis and other conditions directly associated with high humidity.

== Residence ==
Fulbe herdsmen build domed houses called suudu hudo or bukkaru made from grasses. During the dry season, these houses are often supported with compact millet stalk pillars; in the wet or rainy season, they are supported by reed mats held together and tied against wood poles. The advantage of the bukkaru house is that it is mobile and easy to set up and dismantle. When it is time to relocate, the houses are dismantled and loaded onto a camel, horses, donkeys, or sometimes cattle for transport. In recent times some herdsmen now live in mud or concrete block houses.

== Conflict with farmers ==
Historically, Fulbe pastoralists have grazed in lands around the arid Sahel regions of West Africa, partly because of the environmental conditions that limit the amount of land for agricultural purposes, leading to less intense competition for land between farmers and herders. However, after recurrent droughts in the arid Sahel regions, Fulbe pastoralists have gradually moved southwards to the Guinea savanna and the tropical forest areas, resulting in competition for grazing routes with farmers. Farmers have also moved north with the increase in population.

=== Nigeria ===
Fulbe pastoralists started migrating into northern Nigeria from the Senegambia region around the thirteenth or fourteenth century. After the Uthman dan Fodio jihad, the Fulbe became integrated into the Hausa culture of Northern Nigeria. Thereafter, during the dry season when the tsetse fly population is reduced, Fulbe pastoralists began to drive their cattle into North Central returning to the North West and East at the onset of the rainy season. But while managing the herd and driving cattle, cattle grazing on farmlands sometimes occurs, leading to destruction of crops and becoming a source of conflict.

Nigeria's implementation of the land use act of 1978 allowed the state or federal government the right to assign and lease land and also gave indigenes the right to apply and be given a certificate of occupancy to claim ownership of their ancestral lands. This placed the pastoral Fulbe in a difficult position because most did not apply for lands of occupancy of their grazing routes, and recurring transhumance movement led to encroachment on the properties of others. The Nigeria government designed some areas as grazing routes, but this has not reduced clashes. From 1996 to 2006 about 121 people lost their lives in Bauchi and Gombe states as a result of conflicts between pastoralists and farmers.

Thousands of people have been killed since 2016 in clashes between farmers and semi-nomadic herders.

In Nigeria, Fulani herdsmen are represented by advocacy groups such as Miyetti Allah.

=== Ghana ===
Fulbe groups in Ghana are pastoralist usually living in Northern Ghana because of their Senegambia origin; as a result, their rights to use the areas termed ancestral lands by indigenous ethnic groups have met with some reservations.

=== Mali ===
In March 2019, 160 Fulbe herders were massacred in the villages of Ogossagou and Welingara in Mopti region. The perpetrators were alleged to be hunters belonging to the Dogon ethnic group.

== See also ==
- Nomadic pastoralism

== Sources ==
- Iro, Ismail (1994). From nomadism to sedentarism : an analysis of development constraints and public policy issues in the socioeconomic transformation of the pastoral Fulani of Nigeria (Thesis). Howard university.
- Okello, Anna; Mejekodunmi, Ayodele (2014). "Identifying motivators for state-pastoralist dialogue: Exploring the relationships between livestock services, self-organisation and conflict in Nigeria's pastoralist Fulani". Pastoralism. 4. doi:10.1186/s13570-014-0012-7.
- Tonah, Steve (2002). "Fulani Pastoralists, Indigenous Farmers and the Contest for Land in Northern Ghana". Africa Spectrum. 37 (1).
