= List of massacres in Nigeria =

The following is a list of massacres that have occurred in Nigeria:

== Lists of massacres ==
Note: below categories may be imprecise and somewhat overlap. Reports sometimes misattribute motivation as well as the attacks possibly having mixed/multiple motivations. For example, a communal conflict between herders and farmers may appear motivated by religion and thus be categorized as "religious massacre" because of the religion of the involved parties.

=== Political and religious motivated massacres ===
| Name | Date | Deaths | Involved | Location – Circumstances |
|---|---|---|---|---|
| 1953 Kano riot | 1953 | ~46 | political/ethnic riot | conflicts between pro- vs anti- independence groups with political parties which also happened to largely sort into Southern vs Northern (Ibo/ Yoruba vs Hausa ethnicity), Christian vs Muslim etc.. |
| Tiv Riots | 1960-1964 | 2,000–4,000 | Various groups | Benue State (since 1976), Northern region, Benue valley – Occurred during protests for the creation of Benue state from the Northern region |
| 1966 Anti-Igbo pogrom | July and August 1966 | 8000-30,000 | Nigerian Army, Hausa-Fulani and others | Northern Nigeria – Targeted killings of Igbo people in Northern Nigeria in revenge for the coup of 15 January 1966. |
| Asaba massacre | 7 October 1967 | Up to 500 men | Nigerian 2nd Division | Delta State, Asaba – Occurred during the Nigerian-Biafran War |
| Ugep Massacre | 24 December 1975 | 65> | Nigerian Army | Cross River State, Ugep – Occurred after soldiers accused towns people of murdering a drunk soldier |
| Bakolori Massacre | 28 March 1980 | 380 | Police | Zamfara State, Bakolori – The government of the defunct Sokoto State wanted to build a dam in Bakolori, (Bakolori Dam) and offered to resettle the people. They refused and the police moved in to forcefully resettle them. |
| 1980 Yan Tatsine riots | 18–29 Dec 1980 | est. 4,177 civilians, 100 police, 35 military | religious insurgency | instigated by Maitatsine and his followers in Kano |
| Umuechem Massacre | 1 November 1990 | ~85 | Police | Rivers State, Umuechem – After a protest at Shell's office by youths of the town demanding for electricity, water, roads and compensation following environmental degradation, the police moved in and massacred the town. |
| Odi massacre | 20 November 1999 | 43-2,500 | Nigerian Army | Bayelsa State, Odi – Nigerian military attacked the village of Odi, as part of the Conflict in the Niger Delta. |
| 2000 Kaduna riots also known as the first "Sharia clashes". | Sharia 1: 21–25 February 2000; March Sharia 2: 22–23 May 2000 | 2,000–5,000 | Christians, Muslims | Kaduna State, Kaduna – Religious riots between Christians and Muslims over the introduction of sharia law in Kaduna State, start of the religious riots phase of the Sharia conflict in Nigeria. |
| 2001 Jos riots | 9–17 September 2001 | 500–5000 | Christians, Muslims | Plateau State, Jos – Religious riots between Christians and Muslims. |
| Zaki Biam Massacre | 20–24 October 2001 | Over 200 | Nigerian Army | Benue State – Attack by the Nigerian Army avenging the kidnapping and killing of 19 soldiers by suspected Tiv militia |
| Miss World riots | 22 November 2002 | 200+ | Islamists, later rioting Christians and Muslims | Kaduna State, Kaduna – Inter-religious riots that started on 22 November in Kaduna, along with many houses of worship being burned by religious zealots. Cause: article in Thisday about the 2002 Miss World beauty contest (to be held in Abuja), in which Muslims took offence. |
| Yelwa massacre | February–May 2004 | c. 975 | Christians, Muslims | Yelwa, Shendam and Kano – Religiously motivated killings between Christians and Muslims. |
| Muhammad cartoons crisis | 18 February 2006 | 120+ | Muslims and Christians | Borno State, Maiduguri and Onitsha, Anambra State – The international crisis reached the Nigerian city of Maiduguri, in which over 50 people were killed and many buildings destroyed or damaged by rioting Muslims, outraged because of cartoons about Muhammad in the Danish newspaper Jyllands-Posten. Christians also later burned Muslim corpses and damaged mosque in Onitsha, causing 5,000 Muslims to flee the city to Asaba. |
| 2008 Ogaminana massacre | 26 February 2008 | over 50 | Police | Kogi State, Ogaminana – Police descended on Ogaminana at 8.30 pm, killing and brutalizing mostly elderly men, women and children in a reprisal attack that has sent shock and outrage throughout the country. |
| 2008 Jos riots | 28–29 November 2008 | 381 | Christians, Muslims | Plateau State, Jos – Religious riots between Christians and Muslims over the result of a local election. |
| 2009 Boko Haram uprising | July 2009 | 1,000+ | Boko Haram | Maiduguri, Bauchi, Potiskum, Wudil – Militants killed over a thousand people between 26 and 29 July; during the violence |
| 2010 Jos riots | 2010 | 992 | Christians, Muslims | Plateau State, Jos – Religious rioting. |
| 2011 Abuja United Nations bombing | 26 August 2011 | 116 | Islamists (Boko Haram) | Federal Capital Territory, Abuja – 312 injured; Boko Haram attacked a United Nations compound |
| 2011 Damaturu attacks | 4 November 2011 | 100-150 | Islamists (Boko Haram) | Yobe State, Damaturu – Islamic militants associated with Boko Haram attacked police stations and banks. |
| December 2011 Nigeria clashes | December 2011 | 68+ | Boko Haram | Maiduguri and Damaturu – Militants associated with Boko Haram clashed with security forces between 22 and 23 December. |
| December 2011 Northern Nigeria attacks | 25 December 2011 | 41+ | Islamists (Boko Haram) | Federal Capital Territory, Madalla – 73 injured;Militants bombed a Catholic church. |
| 5–6 January 2012 Nigeria attacks | 5–6 January 2012 | 37+ | Boko Haram | Mubi, Yola, Gombi, and Maiduguri – Terrorists attacked communities; Boko Haram claimed responsibility. |
| 20 January 2012 Nigeria attacks | 1 January 2012 | 185 | Boko Haram | Kano State, Kano – Terrorists attacked government installations including police stations and barracks, Immigration offices etc.; Boko Haram claimed responsibility. |
| April 2012 Kaduna bombings | 8 March 2012 | 38 | Boko Haram | Kaduna State, Kaduna – Terrorists bombed a community. |
| June 2012 Kaduna church bombings | 7 June 2012 | 12-19 | Boko Haram (suspected) | Kaduna State, Wusasa, and Sabon Gari – 80 injured; Islamic terrorists bombed three churches. |
| Deeper Life Church shooting | 7 August 2012 | 19 | Three unidentified gunmen | Kogi State, Okene – Militants attacked a community. |
| December 2012 shootings in Northern Nigeria | 25 December 2012 | 27 | Boko Haram (suspected) | Federal Capital Territory, Abuja – Militants attacked a community. |
| 2013 Baga massacre | 19–20 April 2013 | 228+ | Nigerian army or Boko Haram | Borno State, Baga – Identity of the perpetrators remains unclear; some blame the Nigerian military while others blame the Islamic terrorist group Boko Haram. |
| Mamudo school massacre, also known as Yobe State school shooting | 6 July 2013 | 30 | Boko Haram | Yobe State, Mamudo government secondary school – Suspected Boko Haram terrorists killed at least 41 children and one teacher. |
| Konduga mosque shooting | 11 August 2013 | 44 | Boko Haram | Borno State – At least 44 Muslim worshippers were killed by Boko Haram militants. |
| Benisheik massacre | 18 September 2013 | 159 | Boko Haram | Borno State |
| Gujba college massacre | 29 September 2013 | 50 | Islamists (Boko Haram) suspected | Yobe State, Gujba Yobe school – At 1:00 a.m. suspected gunmen from Boko Haram entered the male dormitory in the College of Agriculture in Gujba, killing at least forty-four students and teachers. |
| Kawuri massacre | 11 January 2014 | 85 | Islamists (Boko Haram) | Borno State, Konduga Local Government – Attack by Boko Haram. |
| February 2014 Konduga massacre | 2 February 2014 | 39 | Boko Haram | Borno State, Konduga – About 39 people are believed to have been killed in an attack by Militants on a Nigerian town. Local residents said the attack on Konduga, Borno, lasted several hours, beginning shortly before sundown with the arrival of gunmen in 4x4 trucks. A mosque and more than 1,000 homes were razed to the ground, residents said. |
| Izghe attack | 15 February 2014 | 106 | Boko Haram | Borno State |
| Federal Government College Buni Yadi attack | 25 February 2014 | 59 | Boko Haram | Yobe State, Federal Government College Buni Yadi – Islamist gunmen killed 59 students at a boarding school in Yobe State. |
| April 2014 Nyanya bombing | 14 April 2014 | 71 | Boko Haram | Federal Capital Territory, Abuja – Two bombs exploded in a crowded bus station in the outskirts of Abuja, Nigeria. |
| 2014 Gamboru Ngala massacre | 6 May 2014 | 300+ | Boko Haram | Borno State, Gamboru – Militants attacked at night and set houses ablaze. When people tried to escape, they were shot dead. |
| Gwoza massacre | 2 June 2014 | 200-300 | Islamists (Boko Haram) suspected | Borno State, Gwoza – Boko Haram attack on Christian villagers |
| 2014 Kano bombing | 23 June 2014 | 200+ | Boko Haram | Kano State, Kano – Dozens of people were killed in a bomb blast at Kano State School of Hygiene. The blast was attributed to militant group Boko Haram by the locals. |
| Zaria Quds Day massacres | 25–26 July 2014 | 34 | Nigerian Army | Kaduna State, Zaria |
| 2014 Kano attack | 28 November 2014 | 100+ | Boko Haram | Kano, Kano State – More 100 people were killed in a mosque in Kano. |
| 2015 Baga massacre | 3–7 January 2015 | At least 100, over 2,000 "unaccounted for" | Boko Haram | Borno State, Baga |
| 2015-2016 Killing of Biafran Protesters | 30 August 2015 to 9 February 2016 | 80+ | Nigerian Army, Nigerian security forces | Anambra State (Onitsha), Abia State (Aba) and Igboland – Over 80 protesters agitating for the secession of the Biafran region from Nigeria have been killed en masse by Nigerian security operatives, while more than 400 others have been arrested, detained or imprisoned |
| October 2015 Maiduguri bombing | 15 October 2015 | 39 | Boko Haram | Maiduguri, Borno State – Three female suicide bombers detonated a mosque, killing 39 people. |
| 2015 Zaria massacre | 12–13 December 2015 | 700-1000 | Nigerian Army | Kaduna State, Zaria – Nigerian army open fire on the Shiite minority when they were conducting a religious procession. |
| Dikwa suicide bombings | 9 February 2016 | 60+ | Islamic State of Iraq and the Levant, 2 female Boko Haram suicide bombers | Borno State, Dikwa, refugee camp – Five suicide bombers infiltrated the camp disguised as refugees. Two set off their bombs as internally displaced persons were queuing for rations. More than 60 were killed and 78 others injured. |
| March 2016 Maiduguri bombings | 16 March 2016 | 24+ | Boko Haram | Borno State – Two female suicide bombers detonated a mosque in Maiduguri, killing 24 Muslim worshippers and injuring 18 others during dawn prayers. |
| 2017 Mubi bombing | 21 November 2017 | 27–50 | Boko Haram (suspected) | Adamawa State – Dozens of Muslim worshippers were killed by a suicide attack during morning prayers in Mubi, Adamawa. According to a police spokesman, 50 people were killed while a reporter on the ground claimed that 27 were killed, all of them were men and boys. |
| 2018 Mubi suicide bombings | 1 May 2018 | 86+ | Boko Haram (suspected) | Adamawa State – At least 86 Muslim worshippers were killed in mosque by a suicide bomber. |
| 2018 Konduga mosque bombing | 23 July 2018 | 11+ | Suicide bombers from Boko Haram | Borno State – Eleven Muslim worshippers were killed in a suicide attack by Boko Haram while eight others were injured in the attack. |
| 2019 Konduga bombings | 16 June 2019 | 30+ | Suicide bombers (3) | Borno State, Konduga Local Government Area – A series of suicide bombings killed at least 30 civilians and injured at least 40. |
| 2020 Gamboru bombing | 6 January 2020 | 38 | Suicide bombers | Borno State, Gamboru – The attack killed 38 and injured 30. |
| 2020 Lekki shooting | 20 October 2020 | More than 12 dead, hundreds severely injured according to Amnesty International, disputed by government. Also, few people were still missing days after the massacre. A development which backed up the claim by eyewitnesses that the army took some corpses after the shooting. | Nigerian Army | Lagos State, Lekki Toll Gate – Nigerian army opened fire on peaceful protesters at the Lekki Toll Gate while they were peacefully seated, singing the National anthem and proudly waving their flags. |
| Koshebe massacre | 28 November 2020 | 76 | Boko Haram | Borno State, Jere, Maiduguri – Boko Haram militants massacred 76 farmers. The attacks were carried out in retribution for farmers cooperating with the Nigerian military. |
| 2022 Plateau State massacres | 10 April 2022 | 150+ | Fulani bandits from Kaduna State | Plateau State, 9 villages in the Kanam and Wase local government areas. |
| Owo church attack | 5 June 2022 | 40-80 estimated | Islamists / herdsmen | Mass shooting and bomb attack of Catholic church in Owo, Ondo State. |
| 2023 Plateau State massacres | 23–25 December 2023 | ~200 | Fulani militia suspected | Plateau State, 17 rural communities in the regions of Bokkos and Barkin Ladi. |
| 2024 Gadan mosque attack | 16 May 2024 | 8 | Lone wolf attack | Gadan, Kano State – A 38-year-old resident of the village attacked the mosque confessed that it was “purely in hostility following (a) prolonged family disagreement". Eight worshippers were killed while 16 others, including four children, were injured by the attack. |
| 2024 Konduga massacre | 1 August 2024 | 19 | Boko Haram | Borno State, Konduga Local Government Area – About 19 civilians were killed and dozens injured in a suicide bombing. |
| 2024 Gwoza bombings | 29 June 2024 | 32 | Suicide bombers (3+) | Borno State, Gwoza |
| Tarmuwa massacre | 3 September 2024 | 130 | Boko Haram | Yobe State |
| 2025 Lake Chad massacre | 14 January 2025 | 40–100+ | Islamic State West Africa Province (ISWAP) or Boko Haram (reports vary) | Borno State, Dumba, Lake Chad region – Jihadists executed farmers from the region of Gwoza and fishermen. Lake Chad is used as a base by Boko Haram and ISWAP. |
| 2025 Plateau State massacres | 24 and 27 March, 2 and 13 April 2025 | 126 | Muslim Fulani | Plateau State, Ruwe, Bokkos, Kimakpa and Zike – Organized attacks killed more than 100 people from Christian villages. Houses were burned and many people injured and raped. 7000 people fled from the violent attacks. |
| Karim Lamido massacre | 24 May 2025 | 42 | Fulani herdsmen | In Karim Lamido local government area of Taraba State, 42 killed (inc 24 United Methodists), 60 homes destroyed and 5000+ displaced |
| Yelwata massacre | 13–14 June 2025 | 100–200+ | Fulani herdsmen | Benue State, Yelewata – Gunmen attacked Christian villagers at the village of Yelewata, killing more than 100 people. A number of houses were set alight and destroyed in the attack. |
| Darul Jamal, Borno State | 5 September 2025 | 63+ | Boko Haram | Jihadist group killed 60+ people including 5 soldiers in an overnight attack in village with a military base near Nigeria-Cameroon border. |
| 2026 Kwara State attacks | 3 February 2026 | 162–200+ | Boko Haram or Lakurawa (claimed by Mohammed Omar Bio) | Jihadist group attacked the villages of Woro and Nuku (7 km to the west) in Kwara State, Nigeria, killing at least 162 residents. |
| Niger State village attacks | 15 February 2026 | 46 | Unidentified armed assailants (militants) | Villages in Niger State, north-central Nigeria — armed gunmen carried out coordinated attacks on multiple rural communities, killing dozens of civilians, abducting some residents, and burning homes and property. |
| 2026 Maiduguri bombings | 16 March 2026 | 27 | | Maiduguri |

=== Bandit attacks ===
| Date | Deaths | Involved | Location – Circumstances |
|---|---|---|---|
| May 5, 2019 | 23 | ~100 bandits | Zamfara State, Kaura Namoda – 23 people were killed in a retaliatory attack by bandits on Tunga and Kabaje villages in Kaura Namoda LGA, after the death of their suspected ally. |
| June 8–9, 2019 | 25 | Large number of bandits, 4 were arrested | Sokoto State, Rabah – Kalhu, Tsage and Geeri villages in Rabah LGA were attacked by bandits during the night. The attack went on till morning, killing 25 people. |
| June 9, 2019 | 16 | Large number of bandits | Zamfara State, Maru – 16 people celebrating Eid al-Fitr were killed by unidentified bandits in Kanoma community of Maru LGA. |
| June 9, 2019 | 18 | Bandits, 4 were arrested | Sokoto State, Satiru – Satiru village of Sokoto state was attacked by bandits, killing 18 people. |
| June 9, 2019 | 47 confirmed dead | Bandits | Niger State, Shiroro – Eight farming and herding villages in Shiroro LGA were attacked on 9 June by bandits, who also stole 525 cattle. Niger State Emergency Management Agency confirmed finding 47 corpses. Permanent Secretary of Niger State for cabinet and Security, Aliyu Isah Ekan, claimed only 12 have been killed. Senator David Uamru had claimed 70 were killed. |
| June 6, 2019 | 34 | Bandits | Zamfara State, Shinkafi – Police confirmed deaths of 34 people in a bandit attack on Tungar Kafau and Gidan Wawa in Shinkafi LGA. |
| April 18, 2020 | 47 | Bandits | Katsina State – Mass murders and robberies in three locations. See also: April 2020 Katsina attacks |
| May 3–5, 2020 | 4 | Fulani | Plateau State – Messiah College High School was closed due to COVID-19, but the attackers stormed the on-campus home of the school's leader. He was shot in the head, while his wife was shot in the back and his two children were shot in the feet. They survived the wounds. |
| June 3, 2021 | 88 | Dozens of bandits on motorcycles | Kebbi state – Cattle thieves attacked seven villages killing 88 people. |
| June 5, 2021 | 50 | Bandits | Oyo state – In Igangan village, a group of bandits invaded and killed 50 people. |
| January 4–6, 2022 | 200+ | Bandits | Zamfara State – Bandits launched a campaign of massacres on civilians, resulting in heavy casualties. |
| 10 April 2022 | 150+ | Bandits | Plateau State – The 2022 Plateau State massacres are linked to the ongoing Nigerian bandit conflict. |
| 6 May 2022 | 48 | Bandits | Zamfara State – Bandits attacked the villages of Damri, Sabon Garin and Kalahe in Zamfara, killing at least 48 people. |
| 24 September 2022 | 15 | Bandits | Ruwan Jema, Zamfara State – A gang of armed bandits killed at least 15 people in a mosque during Friday prayers. |
| 18 July 2025 | 9 | Bandits | Zamfara State – At least 9 killed, many abducted, including women and children, in ‘bandit’ gang attack in Nigeria northwestern Zamfara State. |
| 19 August 2025 | 50 | Bandits | Katsina State – Gunmen stormed a mosque in the village of Unguwan Mantau, killing 50 Muslim worshippers. The Katsina State police stated that the massacre was a "reprisal attack" after local residents had ambushed and killed a number of "bandits" two days earlier. 60 other people were also abducted by the bandits. |
| 28 September 2025 | 15 | Bandits | Kwara State – Fifteen "Forest guards" --local vigilantes/hunters-- were killed and villagers abducted in a ‘bandit’ gang attack in Oke-Ode community of Ifelodun Local Government Area in Kwara State, north-central Nigeria. |

=== Herder-farmer conflicts and communal conflicts ===
See also: Herder–farmer conflicts in Nigeria and Communal conflicts in Nigeria

| Name | Date | Deaths | Involved | Location – Circumstances |
|---|---|---|---|---|
| Herder-farmer conflict | June 25, 2018 | 86 | Christian farmers and Muslim herders | Plateau State – Riots in Nigeria between Muslim herders and Christian farmers. Total 86 dead. |
| Communal conflict | October 19, 2018 | 55 | Christian Adara and Hausa Muslim youths | Kaduna State – A market dispute led to the deaths of two people. In return a communal conflict erupted, Adaras attacked Hausa, killing dozens. The riots left a total of 55 people dead. |
| Communal conflict | January 16, 2019 | Unknown | Jukun and Tiv attackers | Benue State, Guma – Many people were killed amidst a communal conflict between Jukun and Tiv people in Guma LGA of Benue State. |
| Herder-farmer conflict | January 28, 2019 | 7 herders | Vigilantes | Zamfara State – Seven herders were burnt by a team of vigilantes alongside their cows. |
| Herder-farmer conflict | February 4, 2019 | 26 | Herders (suspected) | Zamfara State – 7 villages in Zamfara State were attacked and 26 killed in suspected revenge for killing of seven herders a week before. |
| 2019 Kaduna State massacre | February 10, 2019 | 141 (130 Fulani and 11 Adara) | Fulani herdsmen and Adara militia | Kaduna State, Kajuru – Part of the communal violence leading up to the 2019 election. The government said 130 Fulani were killed,. 11 Adara were also killed. Miyetti Allah said 66 Fulani were buried and 65 remain missing. |
| Unnamed | February 20, 2019 | 17 | Fulani herdsmen | Kaduna State, Ebete, Agatu – 17 people were killed in an attack by militants on Ebete in Agatu LGA of Benue State. |
| Unnamed | February 26, 2019 | 40 Adara | Fulani herdsmen | Kaduna State, Karamai, Kajuru – At least 29 people were reported to be killed in an attack in Karamai community of Kajuru. The attack was suspected to be from Fulani in retaliation to the earlier violence where Fulani settlements were attacked. The governor confirmed a few days later that the death toll had risen to 40. |
| Unnamed | March 2, 2019 | 16 farmers | Fulani herdsmen | Benue State, Gwer West – Herdsmen killed 16 in an attack on Gwer West LGA. The government blamed the attack on allegations of theft of cows by livestock guards made by the military. Residents said the herdsmen brought along many cattle and took over their lands for grazing after killing people. |
| Unnamed | March 7, 2019 | 20 Bassa Kwomu | Egburra Mozum militia | Kogi State, Bassa – 20 Bassa Kwomu were killed in an attack by an Egburra Mozum militia in Bassa LGA, Kogi State. |
| Unnamed | March 10, 2019 | 16-35 | Adara Militants | Kaduna State, Aungwan Barde, Kajuru – Police have put the death toll at 16 in attack by suspected militants. However, the Adara Development Association has claimed an upwards of 35 killed. |
| Unnamed | March 10, 2019 | 17 | Unknown | Kaduna State, Birnin Gwari – 17 vigilantes were ambushed and killed by unidentified gunmen in the mainly Muslim area of Birnin Gwari as they stole cattle. |
| Unnamed | March 11, 2019 | 16-52 Adara | Fulani herdsmen | Kaduna State, Maro, Kajuru – The police have put the death toll at 16 in an attack by suspected herdsmen in Kajuru. However, the Adara Development Association has claimed an upwards of 52 killed in Inkirimi and Dogonnoma villages in Maro. Another version of the attack by a source claimed 46 people were killed in Aungwan Gamu. The police have however not confirmed the claims. |
| Unnamed | March 16, 2019 | 10 Adara | Fulani herdsmen | Kaduna State, Nandu-Gbok, Sanga LGA – 10 people were confirmed killed in Nandu-Gbok village of Sanga LGA after an attack by suspected Fulani herdsmen. Residents suspect it is in revenge for an earlier attack where they say at least 11 cows and 28 sheep belonging to Fulani were slaughtered in the same area before the election. |
| Unnamed | March 17, 2019 | 4 | Ikwo militias | Cross Rivers State, Biase – Four people were killed in an attack on communities of Biase LGA of Cross River State by Ikwo warlords in revenge for burning down of their communities. |
| Unnamed | March 18, 2019 | Several Agbaduma people | Militia hired by Egba, Abogbe and Ologba | Benue State, Agatu – Several persons were killed during a communal conflict that erupted over ownership of lands. The police has stated that militiamen hired by Egba, Abogbe and Ologba people attacked the Okokolo area inhabited by Agbaduma people. |
| Unnamed | March 19, 2019 | 5-10 | Militants | Benue State, Guma – The Nigerian police have said five people were recorded as having died in a suspected herdsman attack in Tse Ioreleegeb village, part of Guma LGA of Benue State. The Guma LGA chairman has claimed 10 were killed |
| Communal conflict | March 19, 2019 | 5 | Iceland group (suspected) | Rivers State, Khana – Five people were confirmed to have been killed by suspected Iceland group members in a cult attack on Kono Boue in Khana LGA. The cause is suspected to be retaliation for killing of their member. |
| Communal conflict | March 26, 2019 | 5 | Christian and Muslim youth | Plateau State, Jos North – Intercommunal violence occurred between Christian and Muslim youth. According to a resident, after the discovery of two dead boys from Angwan Miango over the past week at the border between it and Rikkos, a Hausa community, the people went on reprisal killings against Muslims. Five people were killed as a result in the ensuing clashes. Arewa Christians and Indigenous Pastors Association, however, claimed deaths of 30 Christians. Federal Government of Nigeria has introduce RUGA settlement to cub conflicts between the Herdsmen and Farmer in Plateau State. |
| Communal conflict | April 12, 2020 | 12 | Militants | Niger state, Shiroro County, Tegina Kabata – 12 people killed during the wedding with five people captured including the bride and groom. |
| Odugbeho massacre | 7 June 2021 | 40+ | Fulani herdsmen | Benue State |
| 2021 Mashegu mosque massacre | 10 December 2021 | 16 | Fulani herdsmen | Niger State – Fulani gunmen killed 16 Hausa worshippers and kidnapped several others. |
| 2021 Nasarawa massacre | December 20, 2021 | 50 | Fulani herdsmen | Nasarawa State – At least 50 Tiv civilians were killed in Nasarawa state, due to Fulani herdersmen blaming Tiv farmers for the killings of a kinsman. |
| Owo church attack | 5 May 2022 | 50 | ISWAP or Fulani herdsmen (disputed) | Ondo State – Over 50 people were killed in a massacre carried out in a Catholic Church on Pentecost Sunday. The Government has blamed ISWAP for the murders, but locals suspect Fulani Herdsmen. |
| 2023 Mangu violence | 15–16 May 2023 | 130–200+ | Fulani herdsmen | Plateau State |
| Edo State Massacre | 28 March 2025 | 16 | Mob | Edo State - Group of 16 Hausa hunters lynched by mob. |
| Bassa LGA, Plateau | Apr 14, 2025 | 40–51 | herders | night attack by suspected herders in farming villages of Zike & Kimakpa (Bassa LGA) |
| Otukpo LGA, Benue State | Apr 18, 2025 | 11+ | Herders | Suspected herdsmen attacks on Emichi, Odudaje, Okpamaju, Benue State (Vanguard link) |
| Guma, Logo, Ukum, Kwande LGAs | 10 May 2025 | 23 | Fulani herders | Benue State – Eight people were killed in Ukum, nine in nearby Logo, three each in Guma and Kwande. |
| Benue State – Tyolaha, Tse‑Ubiam, Ahume, Aondona | May 27, 2025 | 42 (10 killed in Tyolaha and Tse-Ubiam; 32 killed in Ahume and Aondona) | Herders | Coordinated weekend attacks attributed to itinerant herders in Gwer West local government area in Benue state. |
| Yelwata, Benue | 14 June 2025 | 45–200 | Cattle herdsmen | Yelwata community in Benue State |
| Wannune, Benue | 20 June 2025 | ?? | Cattle herdsmen | Wannune community, Tarka LGA in Benue State |
| Mangun District, Plateau State | 20 June 2025 | 14 | suspected herders | Mostly children and the elderly killed and houses burnt in Juwan and Manja communities in Bokkos and Mangu LGAs of Plateau State by suspected herdsmen. |
| Mangun District, Plateau State | 21 June 2025 | 12 killed, 22 injured | community vigilantes/mob | Mangun District of Mangu LGA of Plateau State. A group of out-of-town travellers enroute to a wedding were killed when they inadvertently lost their way and found themselves in a tense community that had endured repeated terror attacks, including the prior night. |

== See also ==
- Boko Haram insurgency
- Timeline of the Boko Haram insurgency
- Islamic extremism in Northern Nigeria

== Literature ==
- Isaac Terwase Sampson, "Religious violence in Nigeria: Causal diagnoses and strategic recommendations to the state and religious communities", African Journal on Conflict Resolution (2012) p. 107-112.
