= 2014 Kano attack =

2014 Boko Haram terror attack in Northern Nigeria, Nigeria

2014 Kano bombing
- Part of the Boko Haram insurgency
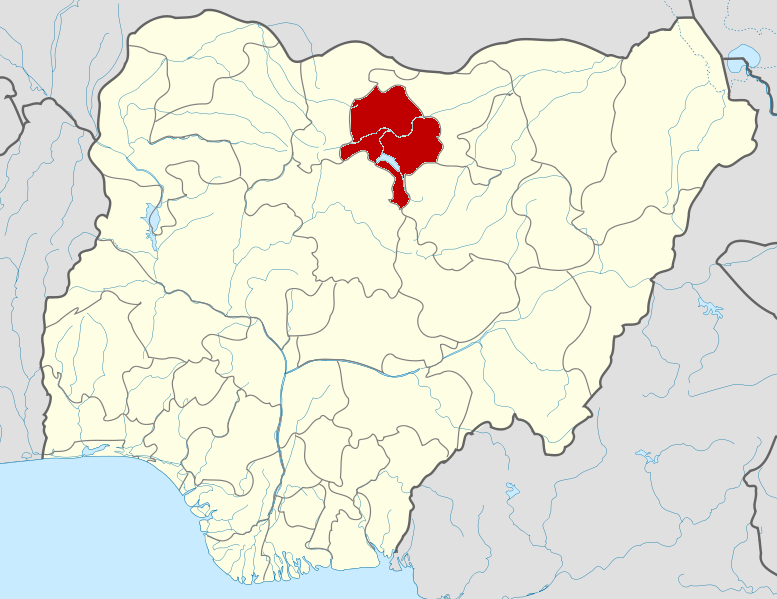
- Location of Kano State in Nigeria
- Location: 11°59′40.62″N 8°31′0.92″E; Kano, Kano State, Nigeria
- Date: 28 November 2014; 14:00 WAT
- Target: Mosque
- Deaths: 120
- Injuries: 260
- Perpetrator: Boko Haram

The 2014 Kano bombing was a terrorist attack on 28 November 2014, at the Central Mosque (Grand Mosque) in Kano, the biggest city in the mainly Muslim Northern Nigeria during the Boko Haram insurgency in Nigeria. The mosque is next to the palace of the Emir of Kano, Muhammad Sanusi II, Nigeria's second most senior Muslim cleric, who had urged the civilians to protect themselves by arming up against Boko Haram. Two suicide bombers blew themselves up and gunmen opened fire on those who were trying to escape. Around 120 people were killed and another 260 injured.

== Background ==
On 25 November, two female suicide bombers killed over 45 people in a crowded market in Maiduguri, Borno State. On 27 November, around 50 people were killed in Damasak by the Boko Haram militants. A bomb attack was also foiled near a mosque in Maiduguri hours before the Kano bombings. A roadside bomb, suspected to be remote-controlled, was defused.

== Bombings ==
The attack occurred on 28 November 2014 when the Friday prayer was under way. Three bombs were detonated when the prayers had just started. According to an eyewitness, two blasts were in the courtyard, while the third was on a nearby road. Another eyewitness said, "The imam was about to start prayer when he saw somebody in a car trying to force himself into the mosque. But when people stopped him, he detonated the explosions. People started running helter-skelter." Following the explosions, gunmen opened fire at people. According to national police spokesman Emmanuel Ojukwu, the angry mob killed four gunmen after the shootings.

== Aftermath ==
Nigerian President Goodluck Jonathan condemned the attacks and ordered the national security services "to launch a full-scale investigation and to leave no stone unturned until all agents of terror undermining the right of every citizen to life and dignity are tracked down and brought to justice". In December 2014, the leader of the Nigerian Islamist group Boko Haram, Abubakar Shekau, accused the emir of Kano, Sanusi Lamido Sanusi, of deviating from Islam and threatened to kill him.

According to reports, upon a request for help from Nigeria, Britain was considering sending military trainers to aid the Nigerian military in resisting the Boko Haram terrorist attacks.

== See also ==
- List of massacres in Nigeria
- 2013 Kano Bus bombing
- January 2012 Nigeria attacks
