= Yelwa =

Coordinates: 10°53′N 4°45′E

Yelwa is a town in Kebbi State, Nigeria on the Niger River and the A1 highway. The town is often referred to as "Yelwa, Yauri", after the Emirate and Local Government Administration it is in, and is not the Yelwa where the Yelwa Massacre took place in 2004 in Plateau State. Yelwa is the capital and largest city of the Yauri Emirate. Yelwa has a population of 8,000 as of 2010, a majority of whom are Hausa Muslims.

Yelwa is the market center and trade hub of the Yauri Emirate. Besides trade, its economy centers around agriculture. Major export crops include onions, rice, and cotton, although Yelwa also produces considerable amounts of sorghum, millet, cowpeas, peanuts, sugarcane, shea nuts, tobacco, kola nuts, peppers, beans, fish, cattle, and guinea fowl. Most farmers (79.2 percent) in the Yelwa area are subsistence farmers, and most rent the land they farm or are sharecroppers.

== History ==
Yelwa has been the capital of the Yauri Emirate since 1888, when the capital was moved there from Bin Yauri following a civil war. In 1896, the Royal Niger Company established a trading post in Yauri. The town was occupied by the British in 1901.

Part of Yelwa was permanently flooded by the creation of the Kainji Dam in 1986. Almost half of the residents of Yauri, including many in Yelwa, were displaced by the construction of the Kainji Dam, which has had detrimental effects on agriculture in the area.

In 2004, over 700 people died in a series of inter-religious conflicts.

On 16 February 2018, a Martian crater was named after Yelwa.

== Climate ==
Climate data for Yelwa (1991–2020)
Month	Jan	Feb	Mar	Apr	May	Jun	Jul	Aug	Sep	Oct	Nov	Dec	Year
Record high °C (°F)	42 (108)	45.2 (113.4)	46.3 (115.3)	44.2 (111.6)	43.5 (110.3)	43 (109)	39.5 (103.1)	39 (102)	38 (100)	42 (108)	41 (106)	41.7 (107.1)	46.3 (115.3)
Mean daily maximum °C (°F)	34.9 (94.8)	37.5 (99.5)	39.6 (103.3)	39.0 (102.2)	36.1 (97.0)	33.3 (91.9)	31.6 (88.9)	30.6 (87.1)	31.5 (88.7)	33.4 (92.1)	35.8 (96.4)	35.4 (95.7)	34.9 (94.8)
Daily mean °C (°F)	25.5 (77.9)	28.5 (83.3)	31.7 (89.1)	32.6 (90.7)	30.7 (87.3)	28.5 (83.3)	27.4 (81.3)	26.7 (80.1)	27.0 (80.6)	28.2 (82.8)	27.4 (81.3)	25.9 (78.6)	28.3 (82.9)
Mean daily minimum °C (°F)	16.0 (60.8)	19.4 (66.9)	23.7 (74.7)	26.2 (79.2)	25.2 (77.4)	23.7 (74.7)	23.2 (73.8)	22.8 (73.0)	22.6 (72.7)	23.0 (73.4)	19.0 (66.2)	16.4 (61.5)	21.8 (71.2)
Record low °C (°F)	10 (50)	12 (54)	10.2 (50.4)	16 (61)	15 (59)	0.6 (33.1)	16 (61)	16.6 (61.9)	16 (61)	16 (61)	12 (54)	10 (50)	0.6 (33.1)
Average precipitation mm (inches)	1.3 (0.05)	0.9 (0.04)	0.9 (0.04)	38.2 (1.50)	98.9 (3.89)	151.4 (5.96)	200.8 (7.91)	294.1 (11.58)	222.1 (8.74)	80.4 (3.17)	0.0 (0.0)	0.0 (0.0)	1,089 (42.87)
Average precipitation days (≥ 1.0 mm)	0.1	0.0	0.3	2.6	6.9	8.6	11.1	13.9	13.9	6.0	0.3	0.0	63.6
Average relative humidity (%)	36.5	30.9	35.8	49.4	64.3	72.1	79.3	84.2	83.0	75.8	56.3	45.6	59.4
Source: NOAA
