= 2020s in electoral politics =

2020s in electoral politics refers to events and outcomes from elections all around the world, during the decade of the 2020s.

== Africa ==
=== Benin ===
Presidential elections were held in Benin on 11 April 2021 to elect the President of the Republic of Benin for a five-year term. Incumbent president Patrice Talon was re-elected for a second term in office with 86% of the vote.

=== Burkina Faso ===
General elections were held in Burkina Faso on 22 November 2020 to elect the President and National Assembly. In the presidential elections, incumbent president Roch Marc Christian Kaboré of the People's Movement for Progress was re-elected in the first round with 57.9% of the vote, avoiding the need for second round. The main campaign focus of the major presidential candidates was the growing insecurity in the country with the rise in terrorism and ethnic violence.

=== Burundi ===
General elections were held in Burundi on 20 May 2020 to elect both the president and the National Assembly. Évariste Ndayishimiye of the ruling CNDD–FDD was elected president with 71% of the vote. In the National Assembly elections, the CNDD–FDD won 72 of the 100 elected seats. The Conference of Bishops of Burundi issued a statement criticizing the transparency and freedom of the election process. The church deployed around 2,716 observers across Burundi's 119 municipalities. The conference's observers witnessed intimidation and expulsion of opposition observers from the polling and vote counting stations. The church condemned the ruling party for engaging in national election fraud. The East African Community issued a statement saying that "The 2020 Burundi elections hold an iconic place in the history of the nation, marking this the first peaceful and democratic transfer of power. More significantly, the process was domestically driven through own funding. The peaceful conclusion of the electoral process will not only be a big win for the people of Burundi, but for the East African Community as a region."

=== Cameroon ===
Parliamentary elections were held in Cameroon on 9 February 2020. The Cameroon People's Democratic Movement retained its majority in parliament, winning 139 of the 167 seats decided on election day. The ongoing Anglophone Crisis dominated the process, with supporters of Ambazonia calling for a boycott of the election. Ensuing violence resulted in a low turnout in the Northwest Region and Southwest Region, with separatists claiming that 98 percent of eligible voters had boycotted the election.

=== Cape Verde ===
Parliamentary elections were held in Cape Verde on 18 April 2021. The current prime minister, Ulisses Correia e Silva of the Christian democrat Movement for Democracy (MpD) party, won re-election after five years of government. His main contender was Janira Hopffer Almada, of the moderate socialist African Party for the Independence of Cape Verde (PAICV). The two parties have been the dominant political forces in Cape Verde since its democratization, but several new parties were taking part in the election.

=== Comoros ===
Legislative elections were held in the Comoros on 19 January 2020; in constituencies where no candidate received a majority, a second round was held alongside local elections on 23 February. The elections were boycotted by the main opposition parties, including the two largest parties in the outgoing parliament, the Union for the Development of the Comoros and Juwa Party, in protest at constitutional reform and political repression, The result was a landslide victory for President Azali Assoumani's Convention for the Renewal of the Comoros, which won 20 of the 24 elected seats.

=== Côte d'Ivoire ===
Presidential elections were held in Ivory Coast on 31 October 2020. The election, boycotted by the opposition, saw the reelection of incumbent Alassane Ouattara. Several people were killed in clashes in Toumodi, as well as Tiébissou.

=== Djibouti ===
Presidential elections were held in Djibouti on 9 April 2021. Incumbent president Ismaïl Omar Guelleh was re-elected for his fifth five-year term, having served in the role since 1999.

=== Ghana ===
General elections were held in Ghana on 7 December 2020. Incumbent president Nana Akufo-Addo of the New Patriotic Party (NPP) was re-elected in the first round after securing a majority of the votes. Former president John Dramani Mahama said he would contest the results.

=== Guinea ===
Parliamentary elections were held in Guinea on 22 March 2020 alongside a constitutional referendum, after being postponed four times from the original date of January 2019. The 2020 Guinean presidential election resulted in a third term for President Alpha Condé, with protests against him resulting in at least 30 deaths according to the opposition.

=== Mali ===
Parliamentary elections were held in Mali on 29 March 2020, with a second round on 19 April. They were initially scheduled to be held on 25 November and 16 December 2018, but were moved to April 2019 and then to June 2019, before being postponed until 2020 by the Council of Ministers. The elections were marred by violence in the north and center of the country.

Incidents on April 19 prevented some people from casting votes, and on 30 April the Constitutional Court overturned the results in 31 districts, giving Rally for Mali, which is led by President Ibrahim Boubacar Keïta, ten more seats than originally expected. Opposition parties led by Iman Mahmoud Dicko established the Mouvement du 5 juin - Rassemblement des forces patriotiques (in French) (June 5 Movement - Rally of Patriotic Forces) on 30 May, and thousands took to the streets in protest on 5 June.

Boubou Cisse was reappointed prime minister on 11 June, when he was instructed to form a new government. Tens of thousands of Malians protested again on 19 June, demanding the resignation of President Keïta. On June 20, the Economic Community of West African States (ECOWAS) called for new elections to be held.

President Ibrahim Boubacar Keïta and Imam Mahmoud Dicko met on 5 July, but the opposition continued to call for civil disobedience to force Keïta's resignation and the dissolution of Parliament. Protests turned violent on 10 July. For the next three days, protesters in Bamako clashed with security forces, and security forces reportedly fired live rounds at the protesters, killing at least 11 and injuring 124.

=== Namibia ===
==== 2024 election ====
General elections were held in Namibia to elect a new president and members of the National Assembly. Initially scheduled on 27 November 2024, these were later extended in some areas to 30 November due to poor planning. Opposition parties decried the move, boycotting the declaration of results and pledging to challenge the results of the election in court. They were the country's seventh general elections since gaining independence from apartheid South Africa in 1990.

On 3 December 2024, Netumbo Nandi-Ndaitwah of the ruling SWAPO party was declared the winner of the election. She became Namibia's first female president. The National Assembly elections saw SWAPO reduced to 51 seats, a bare majority of three. It was SWAPO's weakest showing since Namibia's independence in 1990.

=== Nigeria ===
A Presidential election was held on 25 February 2023 in Nigeria (Note: Due to disruptions—mainly violence or technical issues—on election day, INEC either postponed or extended voting to 26 February in certain affected areas.) to elect the president and vice president. All Progressives Congress (APC) nominee Bola Tinubu defeated Atiku Abubakar of the Peoples Democratic Party and Peter Obi of Labour Party.

Party's primary elections were conducted between 4 April and 9 June 2022; Peoples Democratic Party (PDP) nominated Atiku Abubakar while All Progressives Congress (APC) chose Bola Tinubu as their nominee. The dominance of the two major parties began to fray as a revived party, the Labour Party (LP), nominated Peter Obi, former governor of Anambra State while another party, New Nigeria Peoples Party (NNPP), nominated Rabiu Kwankwaso, former governor of Kano State. The vice presidential candidates were announced some weeks later, and the nominees were Ifeanyi Okowa for PDP, Yusuf Datti Baba-Ahmed for LP, Kashim Shettima for APC, and Isaac Idahosa for NNPP.

Corruption, electoral malpractice, and insecurity, among others were issues during the election. Others include views for the reformation of the Independent National Electoral Commission (INEC), who rather cumulated the results from the polling units manually after failing to upload them online through the result viewing portal as assured to the citizens.

The results were announced on 26 February at the National Collation Centre in Abuja, where INEC declared the presidential and vice presidential nominees for APC as the winner in 1 March. The result was rejected by some international bodies as well as the opposition parties who criticised the results and legally challenged it. Former president Olusegun Obasanjo also called for the re-run of the election, citing fraud and violence.

=== Seychelles ===
General elections were held in Seychelles on 22–24 October 2020 to elect the President and members of the National Assembly. The National Assembly elections had been due in 2021, but in July 2020 were brought forward by President Danny Faure in order to hold them together with the presidential elections, a proposal supported by opposition parties.

The presidential elections were won by Wavel Ramkalawan of the Linyon Demokratik Seselwa (LDS), with the LDS also increasing its majority in the National Assembly, winning 25 of the 35 seats.

=== Somalia ===
Presidential elections were held in Somalia in 15 May 2022. The election was held indirectly and after the elections for the House of the People, which began on 1 November 2021 and ended on 13 April 2022.

The elections were first scheduled to end on 24 December 2021. By 25 December, only 24 of 275 representatives had been elected and the ongoing political crisis further complicated matters. The incumbent president, Mohamed Abdullahi Mohamed, had been in office since the February 2017 election and his term expired on 8 February 2021; however, it was extended until after the elections would be completed. On 10 January 2022, Somali leaders announced they struck a deal to complete presidential and parliamentary elections by 25 February, after repeated delays that have threatened the stability of the country. The agreement was reached after several days of talks, hosted by Roble, with state leaders aimed at ending an impasse over the polls. On 25 February, the presidential election was further postponed to 15 March. On 15 March, the presidential election was again further postponed to 31 March in order to complete the election of the House of the People. On 13 April, the election of the House of the People was completed. The presidential elections date was thereafter set for 15 May. The International Monetary Fund threatened that Somalia would lose access to a three-year $400-million aid package if a new administration was not in place by the end of May.

After three rounds, involving 38 candidates, parliamentary officials counted more than 165 votes in favour of Hassan Sheikh Mohamud, more than the number required to defeat the incumbent president. He was declared president in a peaceful transition of power after the incumbent president conceded defeat and congratulated the victor. Celebratory gunfire rang out in parts of Mogadishu. The United Nations in Somalia welcomed the conclusion of the election, praising the “positive” nature of the electoral process and peaceful transfer of power.

=== Tanzania ===
General elections were held in Tanzania on 28 October 2020 to elect the President and National Assembly. The presidential election was won by incumbent John Magufuli of the Chama Cha Mapinduzi party. On 24 October 2020 the opposition claimed that the government was interfering in the election by making it more difficult to accredit thousands of opposition electoral observers, whose job is to ensure that the election is fair. The opposition has also claimed that the National Electoral Commission, whose members are appointed by the president, have barred the challenger Lissu from campaigning while letting the incumbent Magufuli campaign. From 27 October, the Tanzania Communication Regulatory Authority (TCRA) blocked several popular social media websites to restrict communication amid violence in the islands of Zanzibar, where dozens have been shot dead and tens have been injured by the police and other security forces. Tanzania electoral watch panel, USA State Department, Commonwealth, and European Union were very critical about the elections.

=== Togo ===
Presidential elections were held in Togo on 22 February 2020. Incumbent president Faure Gnassingbé of the Union for the Republic (UPR) was re-elected for his fourth term with 71% of the vote in the first round. His closest challenger was Agbéyomé Kodjo, a former prime minister and leader of the newly established Patriotic Movement for Democracy and Development, who received 19% of the vote.

After observing the elections, ECOWAS determined that they were free and transparent, commending the population for its peaceful participation as an improvement from protests years prior against the long reign of the Gnassingbe family. However, sporadic internet shutdowns were recorded across the capital and other major cities, prompting both international watchdogs and opposition parties to question the results.

On 25 February Kodjo filed a petition at the Constitutional Court asking it to overturn the results. Three days later, he and Kpodzro called for public protests, resulting in the military surrounding their homes and the Ministry of Territorial Administration stating that protests would be illegal. Members of the National Assembly responded by accusing Kodjo of planning a coup.

== Asia ==
=== Azerbaijan ===
Parliamentary elections were held in Azerbaijan on 9 February 2020. They were originally scheduled to take place in November 2020, but were brought forward after parliament was dissolved in December 2019. Opposition parties accused President Ilham Aliyev of limiting their ability to campaign, and called for a boycott of the election. The ruling New Azerbaijan Party retained its majority, winning 72 of the 125 seats, although this was later reduced to 70 when results in two constituencies were annulled. The second largest party (the Civic Solidarity Party) won only three seats.

=== China ===
On 23 October 2022, Xi Jinping is elected as General Secretary of the Chinese Communist Party by the Central Committee, beginning a third term of the paramount leader of China.

=== India ===
Droupadi Murmu became President of India on 25 July 2022. She was the Bharatiya Janata Party (BJP)-led National Democratic Alliance (NDA) nominee and defeated the United Opposition nominee and former minister of finance, Yashwant Sinha. Prior to being the presidential nominee, she was the Governor of Jharkhand and a minister in Odisha Government.

The premiership of Narendra Modi began on 26 May 2014 with his swearing-in as the Prime Minister of India at the Rashtrapati Bhavan. He became the 14th Prime Minister of India, succeeding Manmohan Singh of the Indian National Congress. Modi's first cabinet consisted of 45 ministers, 25 fewer than the previous United Progressive Alliance government. 21 ministers were added to the council of ministers on 9 November 2014.

In 2019, he was elected as the prime minister of India for the second time and sworn in at the Rashtrapati Bhavan on 30 May 2019. His second cabinet consisted of 54 ministers and initially had 51 ministers, which was expanded to 77 ministers during a reshuffle on 7 July 2021. His premiership has, to a considerable extent, practiced high command culture.

Some media accuse India has experienced democratic backsliding under his premiership, however this claim is denied by other sources.

=== Japan ===
On 29 September 2021, Fumio Kishida defeated Taro Kono in a runoff vote to become the leader of the ruling Liberal Democratic Party (LDP) and replaced outgoing party leader Yoshihide Suga. He received a total of 257 votes, from 249 parliament members and eight rank-and-file members, to become Japan's next prime minister. Kishida's Cabinet, which took office on 4 October 2021, consists of 21 members, including 13 who joined the Cabinet for the first time while also including 2 veterans, Toshimitsu Motegi and Nobuo Kishi who retained their respective posts from the previous cabinet under Suga. Kishida announced he would call a general election for 31 October 2021.

=== Mongolia ===
Parliamentary elections were held in Mongolia on 24 June 2020. The result was a victory for the ruling Mongolian People's Party, which won 62 of the 76 seats, a slight decrease from the 65 won in the 2016 elections. The Prime Minister Ukhnaagiin Khürelsükh resigned on 27 January 2021 following a minor protest against the mistreatment of a hospital patient.

=== Myanmar ===
General elections were held in Myanmar on 8 November 2020, in which the National League for Democracy won 396 out of 476 seats in parliament, while the military's proxy party, the Union Solidarity and Development Party, won only 33 seats. In the 2021 Myanmar coup d'état, democratically elected members of the ruling National League for Democracy were detained and/or deposed from their offices by the Tatmadaw; Myanmar's military.

=== North Korea ===
At the 8th Congress of the Workers' Party of Korea, Kim Jong-un was elected as the General Secretary of the ruling Workers' Party of Korea, inheriting the title from his late father Kim Jong-il, who died in 2011.

=== South Korea ===
South Korea's 21st legislative elections were held on 15 April 2020. All 300 members of the National Assembly were elected, 253 from first-past-the-post constituencies and 47 from proportional party lists. They were the first elections held under the new electoral system. The two largest parties, the liberal Democratic Party and the conservative United Future Party, set up new satellite parties (also known as bloc parties) to take advantage of the revised electoral system. The reforms also lowered the voting age from 19 to 18.

The Democratic Party and its satellite, the Platform Party, won a landslide victory, taking 180 of the 300 seats (60%) between them. The Democratic Party alone won 163 seats — the highest number by any party since 1960. This guarantees the ruling liberal alliance an absolute majority in the legislative chamber, and the three-fifths supermajority required to fast-track its procedures. The conservative alliance between the United Future Party and its satellite Future Korea Party won only 103 seats, the worst conservative result since 1960.

=== Sri Lanka ===
Parliamentary elections in Sri Lanka were held on 5 August 2020 to elect 225 members to Sri Lanka's 16th Parliament. The incumbent Sri Lanka People's Freedom Alliance coalition claimed a landslide victory in the election, winning 145 seats, while Samagi Jana Balawegaya won 54 seats, Tamil National Alliance won 10 seats and National People's Power won 3 seats. The main opposition United National Party suffered the worst showing in its history following a split over party leadership, finishing in fourth place with only one seat. The election was postponed at least twice due to a surge in COVID-19 cases in the country, before the date was finalized as 5 August 2020.

=== Tajikistan ===
Parliamentary elections were held in Tajikistan on 1 March 2020. The result was a landslide victory for the ruling People's Democratic Party, which won 47 of the 63 seats. The only opposition party, the Social Democratic Party, received just 0.3% of the vote. The Organization for Security and Co-operation in Europe was critical of the election.

=== Vietnam ===
On 31 January 2021, Nguyễn Phú Trọng is re-elected for a third five-year term as the General Secretary of the Communist Party of Vietnam.

== Europe ==
=== Albania ===
Parliamentary elections were held in Albania on 25 April 2021. The Socialist Party of Albania retained its majority.

=== Czech Republic ===
==== 2023 elections ====
Presidential elections were held in the Czech Republic in January 2023, resulting in the election of Petr Pavel. Incumbent president Miloš Zeman was not eligible to run due to the two-term limit.

The first round took place on 13 and 14 January. Petr Pavel, former chair of the NATO Military Committee, ran as an independent on a pro-Western, pro-European platform, and was one of three candidates backed by the centre-right governing alliance Spolu. He won the first round of the election with 35.40% of the popular vote, ahead of Andrej Babiš, the former Czech prime minister running as the candidate of ANO, who finished second with 34.99%. Babiš had expressed opposition to Czech support for Ukraine after the Russian invasion and was characterised in the media as using populist rhetoric. For the runoff, Pavel was backed by most eliminated candidates and by the incumbent prime minister Petr Fiala, while Babiš received an endorsement from the Communist Party of Bohemia and Moravia and the outgoing president Zeman.

The second round was held on 27 and 28 January. Pavel won the runoff against Babiš with 58.33% of the vote to become the president-elect. He assumed office on 9 March 2023, replacing Zeman. Babiš conceded defeat and congratulated Pavel. Voter turnout in the second round was a little above 70%, the highest in a direct Czech presidential election and the highest in any national Czech election since 1998.

The campaign was widely described in the media as divisive. The outcome of the election was viewed as a sign of support for the West in the context of the war in Ukraine, and is expected to strengthen Czech ties with the European Union and the United States.

=== Croatia ===
==== 2019 elections ====
The presidential elections' second round took place on 5 January 2020 between the two candidates with the highest number of votes in the first round. Zoran Milanović won the second round with 52.66% of the vote. The 2020 Croatian parliamentary election took place on 5 July 2020. The ruling HDZ obtained an upset victory over the Restart Coalition, who had previously been leading in opinion polls for several weeks prior to the elections.

=== Estonia ===
==== 2023 elections ====
Parliamentary elections were held in Estonia on 5 March 2023 to elect all 101 members of the Riigikogu. The officially published election data indicate the victory of the Reform Party, which won 37 seats in total, while the Conservative People's Party of Estonia (EKRE) placed second with 17 seats. The Centre Party won 16 seats, a loss of 10, while Estonia 200 won 14 seats, gaining representation in the Riigikogu.

After the previous parliamentary election in 2019, the Centre Party, led by Jüri Ratas, formed a government with Ratas serving as prime minister. His government was brought down in January 2021 after a corruption investigation, and Kaja Kallas of the Reform Party formed a coalition government with the Centre Party, which collapsed in June 2022. Kallas then formed a government with Isamaa and the Social Democratic Party and remained in the position of prime minister.

In January 2023, the National Electoral Committee announced that nine political parties and ten individual candidates had registered to take part in the 2023 parliamentary election. During the campaign period, issues discussed most extensively regarded the Estonian economy, and the country's national defence and security due to the current Russian invasion of Ukraine. Individuals from contesting political parties also participated in multiple organised debates in January and February 2023. Voting at foreign embassies for Estonians outside the country took place from 18 to 23 February, while Estonian residents could vote during the pre-election period from 27 February to 4 March.

These were the first national elections where more than half of the votes were cast electronically over the Internet. Following the election, EKRE submitted an appeal to the Supreme Court of Estonia, requesting that the results be annulled and claiming that "anomalies and technical errors in the e-voting process had been observed", though the appeal was later dismissed. Reform successfully negotiated afterward with the Social Democratic Party and Estonia 200, forming a government headed by Kallas in April.

=== Greece ===
==== 2020 elections ====
Presidential elections were held in Greece on Wednesday 22 January 2020 for the President of the Hellenic Republic. Incumbent president Prokopis Pavlopoulos, who was elected by the Hellenic Parliament on the 18 February 2015, was eligible for re-election but was not suggested by the government. Katerina Sakellaropoulou won the election with 261 votes. She was elected as the 13th and first female President of Greece.

=== Iceland ===
==== 2020 elections ====
Presidential elections were held in Iceland on 27 June 2020. Absentee voting opened on 25 May 2020. Incumbent president Guðni Th. Jóhannesson was re-elected with 92% of the vote.

=== Ireland ===
==== 2020 elections ====
The 2020 Irish general election resulted in Sinn Féin becoming the second largest party of Dáil Éireann. The result was seen as a historic shift in Ireland's political landscape, effectively ending the two-party system of Fine Gael and Fianna Fáil. The reason for the electoral upset for these parties was believed to be in voter dissatisfaction on issues of health, housing and homelessness. Fianna Fáil won 38, Sinn Féin won 37 seats, and Fine Gael won 35. Seán Ó Fearghaíl was re-elected to Ceann Comhairle at the first sitting of the 33rd Dáil on 20 February 2020.

=== Italy ===
==== 2022 elections ====
Early general elections were held in Italy on 25 September 2022. After the fall of the Draghi government, which led to a parliamentary impasse, President Sergio Mattarella dissolved Parliament on 21 July, and called for new elections. Regional elections in Sicily were held on the same day. The results of the general election showed the centre-right coalition led by Giorgia Meloni's Brothers of Italy, a national-conservative party, winning an absolute majority of seats in the Italian Parliament. Meloni was appointed Prime Minister of Italy on 22 October, becoming the first woman to hold the office.

In a record-low voter turnout, Meloni's party became the largest in Parliament with 26% of the vote; as per the pre-election agreement among the centre-right coalition parties, she became the prime ministerial candidate supported by the winning coalition. The League and Forza Italia suffered losses, polling 8% each, and Us Moderates polled below 1%. The centre-left coalition slightly improved its 2018 results in terms of vote share and seats in percentage with the Democratic Party polling 19% and the Greens and Left Alliance passing the 3% threshold; More Europe and Civic Commitment failed to reach the election threshold. The Five Star Movement defied single-digit polls before the campaign and reached 15%. The Action – Italia Viva alliance polled 7%. Among the others to be represented in Parliament were two regionalist parties: South calls North and the South Tyrolean People's Party. Due to the Rosatellum and its mixed electoral system using parallel voting, the centre-right coalition was able to win an absolute majority of seats, despite receiving 44% of the votes, by winning 83% of the single-member districts under the first-past-the-post of the system.

As a result of the 2020 Italian constitutional referendum, the size of Parliament was reduced to 400 members of the Chamber of Deputies and 200 members of the Senate of the Republic to be elected, down from 630 and 315, respectively. In addition, the minimum voting age for the Senate was the same as for the Chamber (18 years old and no longer 25), which marked the first time the two houses had identical electorates.

Observers commented that the results shifted the geopolitics of the European Union, following right wing populist and far-right gains in France, Spain, and Sweden. It was also noted that the election outcome would mark Italy's first far-right-led government and the country's most right-wing government since 1945. The newly elected legislature was seated on 13 October, and proceeded to elect Ignazio La Russa, a known admirer of Benito Mussolini, and Lorenzo Fontana, an opponent of same-sex marriage and transgender rights, as President of the Senate and of the Chamber of Deputies, respectively. The Meloni Cabinet was sworn in on 22 October, and received parliamentary approval through two votes of confidence (one in each House of Parliament) a few days thereafter.

=== Moldova ===
==== 2020 elections ====
The 2020 Moldovan presidential election was won by Maia Sandu becoming the first female president and promising reform of the country's corruption. After entering office, she demanded the withdrawal of Russian troops from Transnistria.

=== North Macedonia ===
==== 2020 elections ====
Early parliamentary elections were held in North Macedonia on 15 July 2020. It was originally scheduled for November 2020, but Prime Minister Zoran Zaev called early elections after the European Council failed to come to an agreement on starting talks with North Macedonia on joining the European Union in October 2019. The election date was set for 12 April, but was postponed until July due to the COVID-19 pandemic in North Macedonia.

=== Poland ===
==== 2020 presidential election ====
The 2020 Polish presidential election resulted in the re-election bid of incumbent president Andrzej Duda, a member of the Law and Justice party. In the first round, held on June 28, Duda emerged as the leading candidate with 43.5% of the vote. Without a majority of 50% of the vote, a runoff was set against Rafał Trzaskowski from the Civic Coalition. In the second round of the election, on July 12, Duda secured a narrow victory with approximately 51% of the vote to Trzaskowski's 49% share of the vote.

The campaign was marked by debates on judicial reforms, LGBTQ+ rights, and Poland's role in the European Union. Amid tensions with the EU, the election had broad implications for the nation's political landscape. Taking place during the COVID-19 pandemic, the election featured adjusted voting procedures, including increased options for postal voting.

==== 2023 general election ====
In the 2023 Polish parliamentary election, Law and Justice returned as the largest party, but without the ability to form a winning coalition in the Sejm, 460-member lower house of parliament. The final results which registered a record turnout of 74.4 percent had the incumbent right-wing Law and Justice with 35.4 percent, followed by the centrist Civic Coalition at 30.7 percent, the center-right Third Way at 14.4 percent, the Left with 8.6 percent and the far-right Confederation with 7.2 percent.

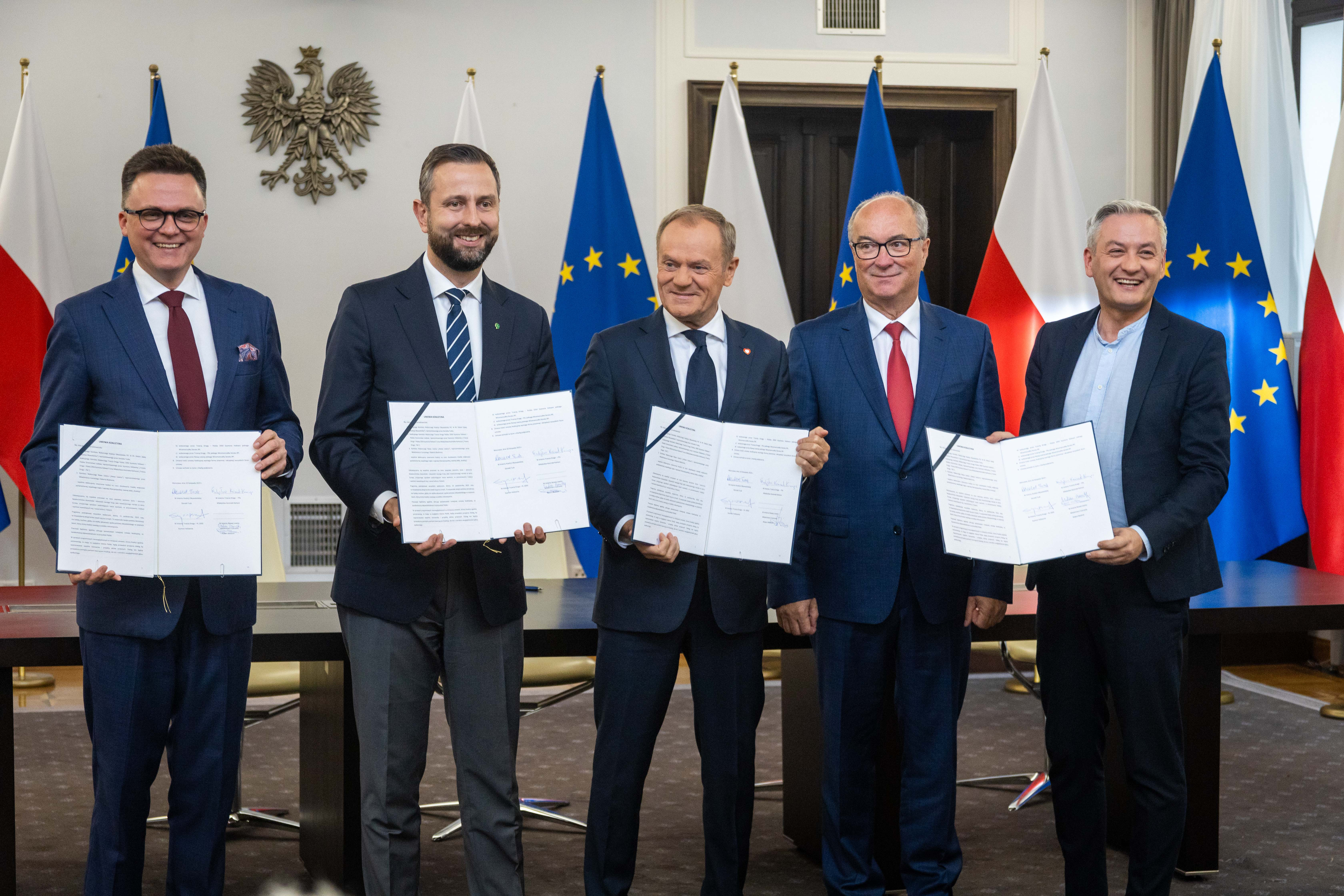
Leaders of the three opposition parties after signing the coalition agreement.

Before the election, Civic Coalition, led by former prime minister and European Council President Donald Tusk, the Third Way and the Left pledged to form a coalition government to oust Law and Justice from power. After the election, together they won 248 seats in the Sejm, enough seats to take power from the Law and Justice. The coalition between these three parties also boosted its control of the less powerful upper chamber Senate, winning 66 seats while Law and Justice won just 34.

Following the election, Poland's parliament elected centrist party leader Donald Tusk as prime minister, allowing the formation of a new pro-EU government after eight years of national conservative rule in Poland. The outgoing right-wing populist Law and Justice government was characterized by various disputes with the EU over issues like judicial independence, the rule of law and minority rights which resulted in billions in funds from the bloc being frozen.

=== Portugal ===
==== 2022 elections ====
Legislative elections in 2022 resulted in the Socialist Party winning an unexpected majority in the Assembly of the Republic, the second time in the party's history. Incumbent Prime Minister António Costa returned to the post until his resignation, triggering snap elections in 2024.

==== 2024 elections ====
A snap legislative election was held on 10 March 2024 to elect members of the Assembly of the Republic to the 16th Legislature of Portugal. All 230 seats to the Assembly of the Republic were up for election. The elections were called in November 2023 after Prime Minister António Costa's resignation following an investigation around alleged corruption involving the award of contracts for lithium and hydrogen businesses.

No party achieved an absolute majority of seats, with the centre-right Democratic Alliance (AD), led by Luís Montenegro, winning 80 seats, closely followed by the Socialist Party (PS), which lost the absolute majority it had gained in the 2022 elections, and was reduced to 78 seats. The election also saw the surge of the right-wing populist Chega party as the third-largest party in parliament, more than quadrupling its previous seat count to 50 seats. Turnout in the election was 59.9 percent, the highest since 2005, and in Portugal alone, turnout rose to 66.2 percent, the highest rate since 1995.

The leader of the largest party, Luís Montenegro, would go on to form a centre-right minority government, ending nearly a decade of rule by the Socialist Party.

=== Romania ===
==== 2020 elections ====
The 2020 parliamentary election had a record low turnout of 31.84 percent due to the COVID-19 pandemic, with the ruling centre-right coalition winning the election, and the far-right Alliance for the Union of Romanians entering the legislature for the first time boosted by vaccine skepticism.

=== Serbia ===
==== 2020 elections ====
Parliamentary elections were held in Serbia on 21 June 2020. Initially organised for 26 April 2020, they were postponed by a state of emergency due to the COVID-19 pandemic in the country. In the period before the elections, inter-party European Parliament–mediated dialogue was held and certain changes in election legislation were made. Numerous parliamentary and non-parliamentary political parties boycotted the elections, including the major opposition coalition Alliance for Serbia, which said that there were no conditions for free and fair elections. This resulted in the lowest turnout since the establishment of a multi-party system in 1990. The Serbian Progressive Party–led coalition won one of the largest parliamentary majorities in Europe.

=== Slovakia ===
==== 2020 elections ====
Parliamentary elections were held in Slovakia on 29 February 2020 to elect all 150 members of the National Council. The anti-corruption movement Ordinary People (OĽaNO) led by Igor Matovič emerged as the largest party, winning 53 seats. The ruling coalition comprising Direction – Social Democracy (Smer–SD), the Slovak National Party (SNS) and Most–Híd, led by Prime Minister Peter Pellegrini of Smer–SD, won only 38, with both the SNS and Most–Híd losing their parliamentary representation. It was the first time since the 2006 elections that Smer–SD did not emerge as the party with the most seats. As no party or electoral coalition won a majority of seats, a coalition government was needed. On 13 March, Matovič announced he had reached an agreement for a governing coalition with We Are Family, Freedom and Solidarity and For the People, though they had not agreed upon a common governing program.

=== United Kingdom ===
==== 2024 election ====
The 2024 United Kingdom general election was held on Thursday, 4 July 2024, to elect 650 members of Parliament to the House of Commons, the lower house of the Parliament of the United Kingdom. The opposition Labour Party, led by Keir Starmer, defeated the governing Conservative Party, led by Rishi Sunak, in a landslide victory.

The election was the first general election victory for Labour since 2005, and ended the Conservatives' 14-year tenure as the primary governing party. Labour achieved a 174-seat simple majority, and a total of 411 seats, a single-party figure surpassed only by Tony Blair in 1997. (Note: The figure does not include Lindsay Hoyle, the speaker of the House of Commons, who was included in the Labour seat total by some media outlets. By long-standing convention, the Speaker severs all ties to their affiliated party upon being elected speaker.) The party's vote share was 33.7%, the lowest of any majority party on record, making this the least proportional general election in British history according to the Gallagher index. Labour won 211 more seats than the previous general election in 2019, but half a million fewer total votes. The party became the largest in England for the first time since 2005, in Scotland for the first time since 2010, and retained its status as the largest party in Wales.

The Conservative Party was reduced to 121 seats on a vote share of 23.7%, the worst result in its history. It lost 251 seats in total, including those of 12 Cabinet ministers and also South West Norfolk, the seat of the former prime minister Liz Truss. It also lost all its seats in Wales. The Conservatives' notional loss of 251 seats represents the highest decrease for any party at a single election in British history, narrowly surpassing 1906, and the corresponding Labour gain of 211 is the largest since 1945. The combined Labour and Conservative vote share was 57.4%, the lowest since the December 1910 general election.

Smaller parties took a record 42.6% of the vote in the election: the Liberal Democrats, led by Ed Davey, made the most significant gains, of 72 seats, with a total of 3.5 million votes; like Labour, this represented a decline in their vote from 2019. It was the party's best-ever result and made it the third-largest party in the Commons, a status it had previously held but lost at the 2015 general election.

Many of the record number of newly-elected independent MPs, including the former leader of the Labour Party Jeremy Corbyn, formed the Independent Alliance group in parliament.

== North America ==
=== United States of America ===
==== 2020 elections ====
Elections were held in the United States on November 3, 2020. The Democratic Party's nominee, former vice president Joe Biden, defeated incumbent Republican president Donald Trump in the presidential election. Despite losing seats in the House of Representatives, Democrats retained control of the House and very narrowly gained control of the Senate. As a result, the Democrats obtained a government trifecta, the first time since the elections in 2008 that the party gained unified control of Congress and the presidency. With Trump losing his bid for re-election, he became the first president to have seen his party lose the presidency and control of both the House and the Senate in a single term since Herbert Hoover in 1932. This was the first time since 1980 that either chamber of Congress flipped partisan control in a presidential year, and the first time Democrats did so since 1948.

Biden became his party's nominee after defeating numerous challengers in the Democratic primaries, while Trump faced token opposition in the Republican primaries. In the congressional elections, Democrats lost seats in the House of Representatives but retained their majority in the chamber by a narrow margin. Democrats made a net gain of three seats in the Senate for a total of 50 seats, taking control of the chamber as newly elected vice-president Kamala Harris could cast tie-breaking votes. Contests for the six non-voting congressional delegates from the District of Columbia and the permanently inhabited U.S. territories were also held during the 2020 elections.

Regularly scheduled elections were held in 86 of the 99 state legislative chambers, and 11 states held their gubernatorial elections. Only one state governorship and two legislative chambers changed partisan control, as Republicans won the gubernatorial race in Montana and gained control of both legislative chambers in New Hampshire. Various other state executive and judicial elections, as well as numerous referendums, tribal elections, mayoral elections, and other local elections, also took place in 2020. The 2020 elections were the last major set of elections to impact the redistricting cycle that will take place following the 2020 census. Significant issues for voters included the ongoing COVID-19 pandemic, as well as health care, the economy, racial unrest and climate change. Social distancing guidelines resulted in unprecedented levels of postal voting and early voting. Voter turnout greatly exceeded recent elections; one projection has turnout by voting eligible population being higher than any election since 1900.

After Biden won the election, Trump and other Republicans refused to concede, making baseless and disproven claims of widespread voter fraud, despite U.S. election security officials saying that the election was "the most secure in American history". These attempts to overturn the election resulted in a deadly attack on the U.S. Capitol, which led to Trump being impeached for the second time and deplatformed across several major social media platforms.

== South America ==
=== Bolivia ===
The 2020 Bolivian general election was won by the Movement for Socialism, which had been deposed from power during the 2019 Bolivian political crisis.

== See also ==
- European Union
