= Nansok Sallah =

Nigerian journalist

Death of Nansok Sallah
- Part of Nigerian Sharia conflict
- Nansok Sallah (Nigeria)
- Location: Mubi, Yola, Gombi and Maiduguri (5–6 January); Kano, Nigeria (20 January)
- Date: 5–6 and 20 January 2012 (UTC+01:00)
- Target: Christian churches and businesses (5–6 January); Police stations, immigration offices and State Security Services' local branch office (20 January)
- Attack type: Shootings
- Deaths: 37+ (5–6 January); 185 (20 January)
- Injuries: unknown (5–6 January) at least 57 (20 January)
- Perpetrator: Boko Haram

Nansok Sallah (1966?- 19 January 2012) is a journalist who was killed in Nigeria preceding a major attack by the Boko Haram terrorist group.

== Personal ==
Nansok Sallah was 46 years old when he was killed. He was from Langtang, Nigeria.

== Career ==
Sallah, who worked at Plateau State Radio and Television and Cool FM in Abuja before joining Highland FM radio, which is a government-owned station Jos. Sallah was the news editor and he produced a weekly call-in radio program called "Highland Profile."

== Death ==
The body of journalist Nansok Sallah was found lying face down in a shallow stream under a bridge in the central town of Jos, less than 200 meters (650 feet) from a military checkpoint, according to statements from the radio's general manager. The journalist's body bore no bruises, but a wound on the back of his right ear was noticeable. Local journalists said no witnesses to the murder had come forward. The organisation called for an investigation into his death, saying Sallah's colleagues suspected assassination because valuables were found on his body. The motive for Sallah's murder is unknown, but it occurred just preceding highly visible attacks by a Nigerian terrorist group.

== Context ==
Just one day after Sallah's death, another journalist, Enenche Akogwu of Channels TV, was killed while reporting on a series of Boko Haram terrorist attacks. The next day, coordinated attacks claimed by a radical Islamist sect killed at least 143 people in north Nigeria's largest northern city, Kano, a hospital official said Saturday, as gunfire still echoed around some areas of the sprawling city.

Since 2009 when the Boko Haram turned violent, Human Rights Watch says the group has been accountable for as many as 935 deaths. In 2011, it was responsible for 510 deaths. In a report released yesterday, the Human Rights Watch called upon Nigerian authorities to stop Boko Haram, a task made complicated because the group is believed to have allies within the government. Boko Haram, which means "Western education is a sin," is a militant group fighting to extend Shariah law beyond the mostly-Muslim northern parts of Nigeria.

At the beginning of the year, the group warned Christians to leave the north. That call was timed with a major attack by Boko Haram on 7 January 2012. From the beginning of the year until Sallah's and Akogwu's murders, Boko Haram has said it had caused 253 deaths, according to Human Rights Watch.

== Impact ==
Other journalists have been attacked or killed in Nigeria as part of the Muslim and Christian conflict. Enenche Akogwu was the most recent journalist to die as a result of a Boko Haram attack. The Boko Haram claimed responsibility in the case of Zakariya Isa after he was killed in Maiduguri, 22 October 2011. In Jos, two reporters for a Christian newspaper, Sunday Gyang Bwede and Nathan S. Dabak were killed by a Muslim mob 24 April 2010.

== Reaction ==
"We mourn the death of Nansok Sallah, and extend our condolences to his family, friends, and colleagues," said CPJ Africa Advocacy Coordinator Mohamed Keita. "Authorities in Jos must pursue all leads in tracking his killer, and bring those responsible to justice." Highland FM general Manager Terzungwe Wua described Sallah as a "cool-headed man who did his job diligently.

== See also ==
- Timeline of Boko Haram insurgency
- January 2012 Nigeria attacks
