= Miss World riots =

Religious riots in Kaduna, Nigeria, in 2002

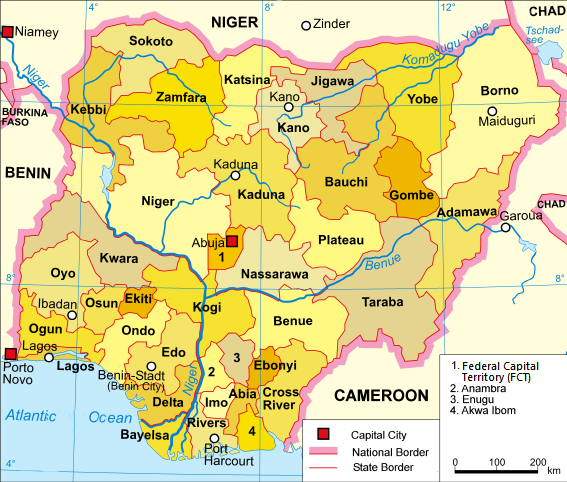
- Riots occurred mainly in Kaduna, other events in Abuja and Lagos.
- Location: Kaduna, Kaduna State; Abuja, FCT; Lagos, Lagos State
- Date: 20 – 23 November 2002
- Attack type: Rioting, manslaughter, pillage
- Deaths: c. 250
- Injuries: 300+
- Perpetrators: Islamists, later rioting Christians and Muslims
- Motive: Revenge for supposed insult of Muhammad, later (also) avenging killed fellow believers

The Miss World riots were a series of religiously motivated riots in the Nigerian city of Kaduna in November 2002, resulting in the deaths of more than 200 people. The Miss World beauty pageant, which was controversial in Nigeria, was relocated to London after bloody clashes between Muslims and Christians, caused by what some Muslims deemed to be a "blasphemous" article in the newspaper ThisDay about the event. The Miss World riots were part of the Sharia conflict in Nigeria, that started in 1999 when several predominantly Islamic states in Northern Nigeria decided to introduce Sharia law.

== Background ==
Because the 2001 contest was won by the Nigerian Agbani Darego, Miss World 2002 would take place in (and be aired from) the Nigerian capital Abuja. In the run-up to the pageant there were many controversies, like the fact that it coincided with the Muslim holy month of Ramadan, and the fact that the whole beauty contest was perceived by many conservative Muslims and also Christians to be unchaste. The organisation conceded to the first complaint by moving the event from the end of November to 7 December, but did not act on the second complaint. In several places, especially in the mostly Muslim north, peaceful protests were held against conducting Miss World in Nigeria. Feminists argued the pageant was too sexist because it merely considered women's beauty and paid no attention to intelligence and character; the organisation conceded to them by altering the swimsuit parade to a photo shoot.

However, conservative Islamic groups turned even more strongly against the Miss World organisation when it took a stand in the case of the Nigerian woman Amina Lawal. Amina had been condemned to death by stoning by a regional Islamic court because of alleged adultery. First, Miss Côte d'Ivoire Yannick Azébian and Miss Norway Kathrine Sørland indicated at the end of August 2002 that they would boycott the beauty contest; other Misses expressed their doubts as well. Miss Belgium, Denmark, France and Spain too decided to stay away, Miss Holland ignored calls to do so; the chairman of the Miss Holland opined: "Then you are actually giving the people in the North what they want. They are stopping an event which is 'perverse' in their eyes and are just continuing their ridiculous legislation." Other Misses also found that exactly by showing up in Abuja they could make a statement against conservative beliefs about women. Civil rights activists eventually were able to persuade the Miss World organisation as a whole to plead for the release of Amina Lawal to the Nigerian federal authorities, eventually convincing them to promise that the stoning would not be permitted.

== Riots ==
After this, a column appeared in the Lagos-based newspaper ThisDay on Saturday 16 November, in which journalist Isioma Daniel wrote that the Islamic prophet Muhammad would probably have approved of the Miss World competition: 'The Muslims thought it was immoral to bring ninety-two women to Nigeria and ask them to revel in vanity. What would Mohammed think? In all honesty, he would probably have chosen a wife from one of them.' This sparked outrage among some Muslims, and from 20 till 23 November the city of Kaduna was the stage of bloody riots between Muslims and Christians. Two years earlier, Kaduna had already seen violent Christian-Muslim clashes. Many inhabitants had a strong sense of injustice because none of the perpetrators had been prosecuted afterwards. Moreover, the riots had caused Christians and Muslims to concentrate and isolate themselves in separate districts. The ThisDay incident caused latent tensions in the religiously divided city to erupt.

- Already in the evening of 16 November, prominent Muslims angrily spread the message via fax and SMS. The Lagos office of ThisDay was inundated with telephone calls from furious Muslims; the editor told Daniel that she was to blame, and on Monday 18 November she was stripped of all her responsibilities.
- On Tuesday 19 November, the newspaper published a retraction on its front page and apologised, but to no avail.
- On Wednesday morning of 20 November, the ThisDay office in Kaduna was sacked and burned to the ground by "four busloads" of Muslim fanatics, while another group raided the offices of other newspapers elsewhere, picking out the copies of ThisDay and lighting them in public, according to an employee of the local opinion magazine Weekly Trust, who suspected an organisation to be behind the attacks. The local office chief of ThisDay went in hiding. Also churches were assaulted by Muslims. Daniel immediately quit her job at ThisDay when she heard about it, and stayed at home in the midst of death threats and worried colleagues, relatives and friends.
- On Thursday 21 November, armed rioters attacked shouting Allahu akbar! ("God is the greatest") and No Tazarene! ("No beauty contest") and killing Christians, storming and looting Christian houses, companies and churches and burning them down. Groups of Muslim youths built barricades with burning car tyres, passers-by in Christian neighbourhoods were attacked by them, drivers were pulled out of their vehicles and murdered on the spot with machetes and axes. Eyewitnesses reported that the attackers were between the ages of 12 and 26, armed with machetes, cutlasses, butcher's knives, sticks and guns, their faces painted unrecognisably with charcoal; they appeared not to be from the neighbourhood. Many local Hausa Muslims let Christians hide in their homes, or claimed that a Christian house belonged to them to prevent the attackers from lighting it on fire; there were however also some who told the attackers where the Christians lived. The attackers also slaughtered two Muslim students (who fiercely denied being Christians) by accident because they wore T-shirts rather than traditional Islamic clothing. The riot police did little to nothing to stop the riots. That day, 50 people were killed and 300 wounded according to early estimates. Additionally, there were many burnt out cars and destroyed buildings. The Sultan of Sokoto called for calm and peace on national television, but the federal Minister for Abuja burst into tears in front of the cameras, crying that Daniel has blasphemed the prophet.
- On Friday 22 November, Christian groups took revenge and killed Muslims and set fire to Muslim homes, companies and mosques. At a road block, Christians in their twenties were stopping traffic. They asked people to recite John 3:16 to check who were Christians; Muslims were murdered. Christians from surrounding villages joined the counter-attacks against Muslim districts, several Muslims were killed and burned in the streets. A group of 500 Christian youths tried to assault a Muslim neighbourhood, but they were stopped by the military. The Christian vengeances led to new reprisals by Muslims after the Friday prayer. In the afternoon, the riots spread to Abuja, where Muslim youths set fire to cars. The police were quick to respond however, and there were no deaths. The Miss World organisation, that had already been preparing the event in Abuja for three weeks, decided in the evening of 22 November to move it to London instead, because fears had arisen for the safety of the participants, who themselves had indicated they would rather stay, even after hearing about the tens of manslaughters, to not give in to the pressure of the fundamentalists. Daniel fled to neighbouring Benin.
- On Saturday 23 November, the clashes were finally quelled by security forces, who also killed tens of people in the process of restoring order.

On 26 November, Islamic clerics from Zamfara State issued a fatwa against the journalist Isioma Daniel for insulting the prophet. The fatwa constituted a death sentence, and all Muslims worldwide were called on to murder her. In a statement that was later broadcast on local radio, the deputy governor Mamuda Aliyu Shinkafi of Zamfara declared: "Like Salman Rushdie, the blood of Isioma Daniel can be shed. It is binding on all Muslims wherever they are to consider the killing of the writer as a religious duty." The federal government of Nigeria rejected the fatwa, and it was declared null and void by the relevant Saudi Arabian authorities.

== Aftermath ==
The Kaduna riots claimed the lives of about 250 people, mostly men and boys; 20,000 to 30,000 people lost their homes. More than 1,000 people were arrested on suspicion of inciting or partaking in the violence. The Committee to Protect Journalists and Amnesty International eventually helped Daniel to go in exile in Europe, because it was too dangerous for her to return to Nigeria. Among those killed were the parents of Nigerian footballer and international, Victor Moses, who fled the country as a result.

Amina Lawal, who was very thankful to the Misses for their concern about her fate, but who had spoken out against a boycott (just before the riots broke out), was eventually acquitted on 25 September 2003. Upon the pageant's return to England, many of the boycotting contestants chose to attend, including Miss Norway, Kathrine Sørland, who was tipped in the last few days as the number one favourite for the crown she had previously boycotted. The competition was eventually won by the Turkish Azra Akın; at the time she was the second and at present last Miss World from a Muslim-majority country (the first being the Egyptian Antigone Costanda in 1954).

A number of years later, some extremists in Indonesia had similar riots.

== See also ==
- 2000 Kaduna riots
- 2001 Jos riots
- List of massacres in Nigeria

== Literature ==
- ""Leave Everything to God". Accountability for Inter-Communal Violence in Plateau and Kaduna States, Nigeria. §V. Inter-Communal Violence in Kaduna State, 1987-2002". Human Rights Watch. 12 December 2013..
