= Issues in the 2023 Nigerian presidential election =

The issues in the 2023 Nigerian presidential election are economic, human, and political issues that were discussed prior to and during the general campaign period from the end of the primary period in June 2022 and the final day of campaigning in February 2023.

In the wake of party primaries, several major factors for the upcoming general election campaign were noted, namely: ethnic and religious identity, the role of Buhari and his incumbency power, the economy, corruption, the personal brands of candidates, and public anger with the political status quo. Ahead of the official campaign period, major candidates were to release their policy documents: Abubakar did so in late May but Obi and Tinubu did not unveil their policy documents until after the campaign period commenced in September 2022 with Tinubu releasing his manifesto in mid-October and Obi releasing his manifesto in early December. As the campaign developed, other issues like climate change and sports development rose to prominence. However, civil society reports from January 2023 claimed that the majority of campaigning was not based on policy issues as personality politics, identity politics, and negative campaigning overtook policy discussion.

== Corruption ==
Nigeria has lost hundreds of billions of United States dollars from corruption since independence and its Corruption Perceptions Index score has worsened since 2016. However, after the primaries, analysts noted the unlikelihood of corruption becoming a massive electoral issue as both Abubakar and Tinubu have credible, longstanding major corruption allegations; Obi's candidacy slightly altered this dynamic as allegations against him are more minor. Another reason for the low focus on corruption was the failure of Buhari's anti-corruption war, the promise of which was central to his 2015 campaign. While more major issues like insecurity and poverty have taken centre stage, corruption is still a pervasive policy problem.

For Abubakar, although there are some allegations surrounding his civil service career, much of the graft alleged is based on a United States Senate Committee on Homeland Security and Governmental Affairs report from 2010 that directly implicated Abubakar and his family in a massive intercontinental bribery scheme. The report, issued in the wake of the William J. Jefferson corruption case which also implicated Abubakar, stated that Abubakar's then-wife Jennifer Iwenjiora Douglas brought over $40 million in "suspect funds" into the United States while Abubakar was vice president with the sources of those funds being bribes given to Abubakar by businesses in exchange for preferential treatment and contracts in a process akin to crony capitalism. These bribes and other suspect cash transfers led the American government's Financial Crimes Enforcement Network to later place Abubakar and his wives on an international banking surveillance watchlist. Abubakar has repeatedly denied the report's findings since its release in 2010. Accusations against Tinubu were also serious but different to Atiku's; in a form of corruption associated with the term state capture, Tinubu is alleged to have continuously hijacked billions of naira in Lagos State internal revenue for his own personal and political aims. Through a law he signed while governor, Alpha Beta Consulting—a company heavily linked to and alleged to be directly controlled by Tinubu and his allies—has the sole right to collect state taxes and receives a 10% commission (Note: While originally based on a share of the revenue, bank documents revealed that the yearly commission was increased by ₦1.7 billion from 2019 to 2020 without an accompanying revenue increase; the pay rise was reportedly ordered by Lagos State Governor Babajide Sanwo-Olu—a longtime Tinubu ally—to fund Tinubu's presidential campaign.) for the collection. The founder of Alpha Beta alleges that Tinubu has directly profited from the allocation for about twenty years plus Tinubu is under active investigation by the Economic and Financial Crimes Commission as of June 2021. Coupled with the state capture controversy is Tinubu's forfeiture of about $460,000 to the United States government in 1993 as a result of a case asserting that the government had "probable cause" to believe Tinubu's American bank accounts held the proceeds of heroin dealing; reporting showed that Tinubu had served as a bagman for two Chicago heroin dealers in the early 1990s. For Obi, there are not major scandals although he was mentioned in the Pandora Papers leaks surrounding offshore companies for tax evasion.

In his platform, Abubakar identified corruption as a 'major problem' that "denies millions of people their fundamental freedoms and human rights" before vowing to enact "institutional reforms of anti-corruption agencies" to strengthen them along with creating a "comprehensive National Anti-corruption Strategy." However, Tinubu's manifesto noted fighting corruption as a benefit of its civil service and judicial reforms. Review of anti-corruption plans from the Premium Times noted Tinubu's focus on wealth distribution to fight corruption along with criticism of the idea's potential effectiveness. In his manifesto, Obi placed fighting corruption among his seven priorities with a direct plan to establish the "Office of Special Counsel" to prosecute abuse of power and corruption that "do not fall under the prosecutorial power of existing agencies." While analysts noted the potential difficulty Obi could have getting legislation passed to institute his anti-corruption plans, he was commended for explaining a concrete framework on the topic.

Corruption rose to prominence several times over the course of the campaign period, but mainly specific scandals rather than differences in policy on the issue. In November, news outlets published newly certified United States District Court for the Northern District of Illinois' documents outlining Tinubu's drug dealing-connected money forfeiture in 1993. Although the Tinubu campaign denied the allegations, observers noted that Tinubu himself did not speak on the subject. A few weeks later in early January, Abubakar faced two scandals: a campaign speech he gave in Abeokuta and audio alleged to be of Abubakar admitting to corruption. In the speech, Abubakar said only people who won their polling units for the PDP would receive government jobs or contracts if he wins the presidency, thus inadvertently admitting that government appointments and contracts would be awarded based on party loyalty in his potential administration. In the recording (released by his estranged former aide Mike Achimugu), Abubakar describes the method—special-purpose vehicles (SPVs)—that he and then-President Olusegun Obasanjo used to siphon public funds during their 1999—2007 administration. Both controversies sparked condemnation with a Tinubu spokesperson filing a lawsuit against anti-corruption agencies hoping to compelled them to arrest Abubakar in the wake of the audio release. In response, the Atiku campaign attacked Tinubu for diverting Lagosian public funds through Alpha Beta and called on the National Drug Law Enforcement Agency to arrest Tinubu for drug trafficking.

== Economy ==
The years ahead of the election were extremely difficult for the national economy as several debilitating recessions and high inflation greatly decelerated economic growth amid increasing unemployment. Coupled with the impacts of the COVID-19 pandemic and the 2022 Russian invasion of Ukraine, food prices have skyrocketed and millions of people are projected to fall into poverty if current trends hold. In addition, the country is at risk of losing its frontier market status due to a shortage in United States dollars and the poor economic situation has led to fears to further social unrest. While Buhari has repeatedly claimed that his administration has improved the nation, some analysts blamed his economic policies for compounding the crisis as massive borrowing plus underwhelming revenue led total debt payment to exceed government's revenue by mid-2022. Other analysts have taken a still negative but more mixed view of Buhari's economic policies noting the signing of the Petroleum Industry Act and agricultural production improvements while reiterating the failures in economic growth, high inflation, rising debt, and high unemployment.

As the campaign period began, analysts noted that the three major candidates had broken with Buhari on economic issues with more business-friendly rhetoric and support for further devolution of certain resource control to the states; however, the candidates differ on messages and detailed plans. Similar to his 2019 campaign, the focus of Abubakar's economic agenda revolves around privatisation of government-owned businesses targeting the rail network, oil refineries, and power transmission along with ending the remaining government monopolies in other infrastructure sectors. The other two points of his economic plan are increased commitments to public-private partnerships and allowing "the market greater leverage in determining prices." While critics like the electricity workers' union derided the privatisation proposal as "retrogressive" and noted the numerous failures of previous privatisations, the Abubakar campaign defended the plan as necessary for "sustainable growth" and good national budgeting. Abubakar stated that these ideas along with a close public-private sector relationship could double the GDP within seven years. For Obi, time was spent studying other countries' economics prior to the release of his policy plans; in interviews, he lamented the inefficiency of the Nigerian economy and floated reforming the fuel subsidy system—the subsidies, long-maligned by economists but popular among politicians, are projected to cost the government over 4 trillion naira in 2022 and 6.7 trillion naira in 2023. Later overview of his economic policies in addition to more interviews showed that Obi focused on financial "prudence" with emphasis on saving money and streamlining spending. Like Obi and Abubakar, Tinubu backed expansion of public-private partnerships but he is also in favor of introducing commodity exchange and futures markets. Furthermore, Tinubu backed the creation of regional economic development agencies for each geopolitical zone, blockchain regulatory reform, increased crude oil production, and tax enforcement/devolution along with the deregulation of gas prices and the phasing out of the fuel subsidy system in favor of alternative government investments. Analysis of the Tinubu plans warned of the extreme debt needed to finance the reforms and policies. When released, the Obi manifesto put emphasis on shifting the national economy to focus on exports in addition to wide-scale agrarian reform to boost productivity. Additionally, Obi planned to lessen the cost of government and backed investment to transition to a green economy amid worsening climate change.

Analysis of economic plans noted a joint focus on agricultural growth to drive economic improvement, but a severe lack of detailed blueprints from the manifestos of Tinubu and Abubakar. On the other hand, the Obi manifesto's focus on improved access to funding for farmers and standardising mechanised farming along with wider logistics reform drew praise from analysts.

== Education ==
The Nigerian education system faced consistent challenges on all levels in the years before the election as UNICEF noted about 20 million out-of-school children in 2022 while also showcasing issues in early childhood education and primary school attendance, especially among girls and in the North. (Note: Hundreds of thousands of children in the Almajiranci system, mainly in the North, are counted as out-of-school children due to the often poor and/or limited form of education provided by the system.) While UNICEF and the federal government have formed plans to improve education and enroll children in school, two matters severely hurt the education at-large directly ahead of the election and have made the topic a campaign issue: the impact of insecurity on schools and four university strikes including the nine-month long and the eight-month long 2020 and 2022 Academic Staff Union of Universities strikes respectively. Amidst rising insecurity in 2021 and 2022, both mass kidnappings of schoolchildren and preemptive school closures for safety have made education extremely dangerous while the government-ASUU dispute and the union's ensuing strike led to mass protests as activists criticized the alleged indifference of the Buhari administration.

During the early part of the general election campaign, Obi called on the federal government to hold productive negotiations with ASUU to end university closures while explaining that he intended on using savings from reforming the fuel subsidy to invest in education; Obi supporters also noted the large educational improvements in Anambra State during his term as governor. In his policy document, Abubakar labeled the ASUU strike as an example of the "incessant industrial action" facing the nation while noting the failures of the public education system; one of his five points is to "improve and strengthen the education system" and later in the platform, Abubakar proposed creating "an agency for the regulation of private tertiary education," vowed to promote science and technical education, and suggested partially devolving education to the state level. For Tinubu's part, education was also one of his agenda's "points" and his manifesto noted the importance of education to national development while vowing to upgrade educational infrastructure, end classroom overcrowding, and increase the number of trained teachers. In his manifesto, Obi vowed to introduce a "No Child left Behind" educational policy along with reviewing and improving the functions of the Universal Basic Education Commission and Tertiary Education Trust Fund.

== Ethnic identity ==
Identification as Nigerian or Member of an Ethnic Group poll
The 2022 API Social Cohesion Survey
1. "I feel equally (ethnic) and Nigerian" (36.0%)
2. "I feel more (ethnic) than Nigerian" (35.0%)
3. "I feel only (ethnic)" (15.0%)
4. "I feel more Nigerian than (ethnic) " (10.0%)
5. "I feel only Nigerian" (4.00%)

Although political questions on identity are often based on region and religion, ethnicity also plays a role as the election is the first presidential election since 1983 with three major candidates each from the three largest ethnic groups as Abubakar is Hausa–Fulani, (Note: Abubakar is ethnically Fulani, a distinct group to the larger Hausa people; however, for political purposes in Nigeria, the Hausa and Fulani are often grouped together under the term Hausa–Fulani.) Obi is Igbo, and Tinubu is Yoruba.

As the Igbo are the sole group of the largest three ethnicities to have never produced an elected executive president, Igbo groups like Ohanaeze Ndigbo called for an Igbo to be elected president and protested when the major parties nominated Abubakar and Tinubu. The group also condemned Igbos who accepted the vice presidential slot, a direct slight to PDP vice presidential nominee Okowa. (Note: Okowa is ethnically Ika, a group alternatively classified as either a distinct ethnic group or an Igbo subgroup; Okowa has steadfastly adhered to the latter interpretation, referring to himself as "Igbo." For his part, Wike is ethnically Ikwerre—another group classified as either a distinct ethnic group or an Igbo subgroup—however, Wike follows the former definition and has long denied being Igbo.) For Tinubu's part, prior to the primary, he claimed that it was 'the turn of the Yorubas' to lead the country in a fiery Yoruba language campaign speech in Abeokuta. Coupled with controversy over Abubakar's northern origins was the fact that he is an ethnic Fulani, just like Buhari.

During the campaign, Abubakar was intensely rebuked by civil society organisations and opposing campaigns for stoking ethnic divisions in an October speech where he said that 'northerners did not need Yoruba or Igbo candidates.' The direct appeal to ethnic jingoism also may have violated Section 97 of the Electoral Act 2022 and led to fears of ethnic-based electoral violence. Later that month, ethnicity again rose to the forefront of the campaign as Afenifere—an influential Yoruba socio-cultural organization—became deeply divided over whether to support Tinubu or Obi. By December, Abubakar tried to change his ethnic rhetoric, referring to himself as "the stepping stone to an Igbo presidency" in an attempt to win back Igbo support; however, reporting showed a generally negative reaction to the comment.

== Infrastructure ==
Facing major infrastructural problems across the nation like a lack of urban public transportation and a largely deteriorated highway network due to an absence of maintenance is a constant in election campaigns. In terms of performance, although the Buhari administration invested in and expanded some transportation projects—like the Lagos–Kano Standard Gauge Railway and Nnamdi Azikiwe International Airport rehabilitation, the 2019–2023 term saw continued failures in providing basic access to electricity culminating in multiple massive power grid collapses in 2022. Still the billions spent on other new infrastructure projects like the Lekki Deep Sea Port and gas pipelines have proven fruitful as more projects begin operations despite setbacks and delays. However, later reporting reiterated that the nation could not afford the debts incurred for projects with little guarantee of proper maintenance.

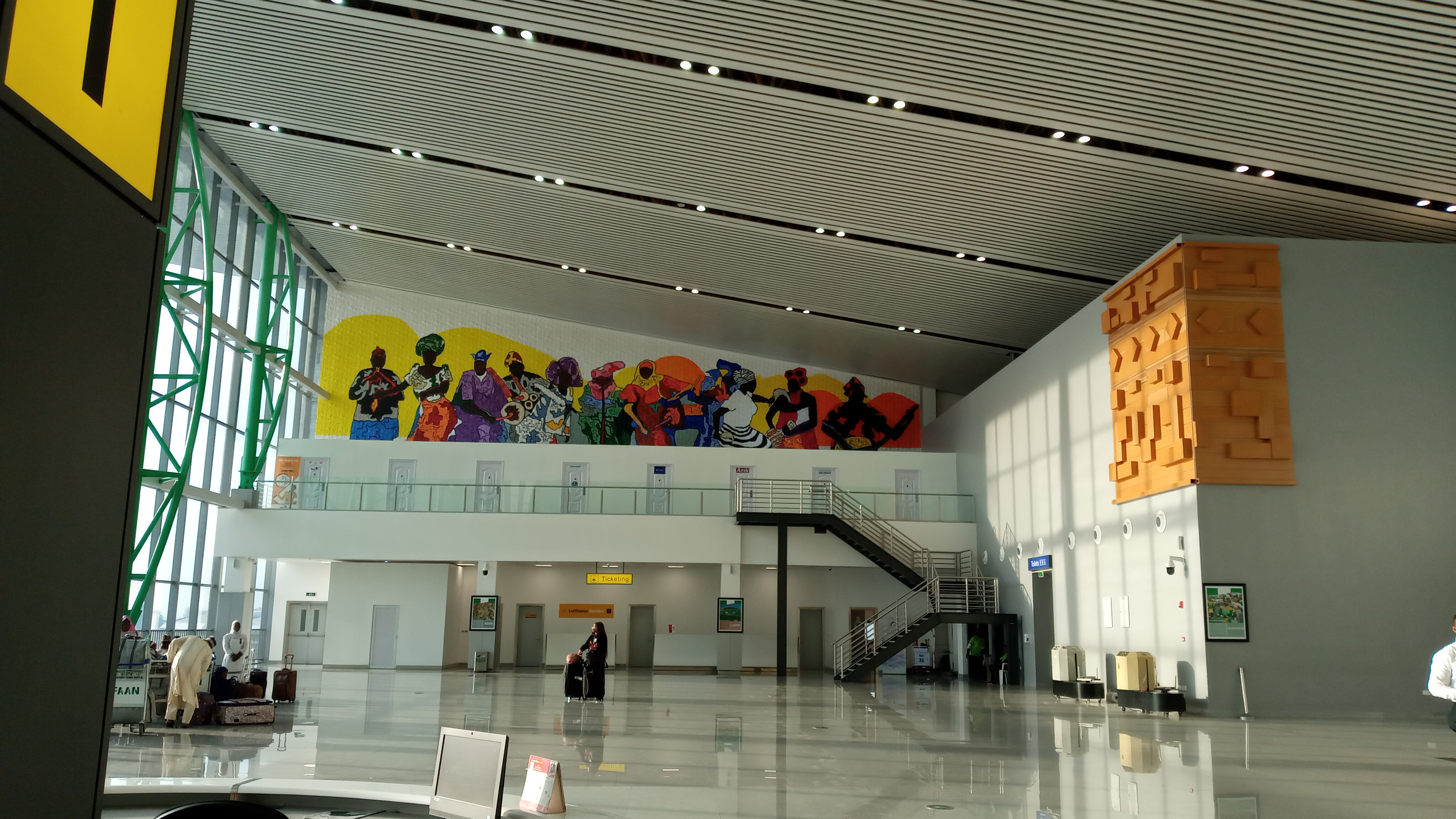
The new Nnamdi Azikiwe International Airport terminal interior.

In his manifesto, Tinubu promised to "modernise and expand public infrastructure" through his "National Infrastructure Campaign" wherein unemployed workers would be hired to upgrade infrastructure like the highway and water supply systems. Additionally, the platform announced the "Critical Infrastructure Protection (CIP)" plan to use technology and improved monitoring to "eliminate attacks on vital national infrastructure" such as illegal oil bunkering. For Obi's part, his plans focused on coordinating different forms of transportation and the agencies that regulate them in addition to establishing a National Transport Commission as an integrated regulator. While Abubakar's policy document did not provide detailed infrastructural plans, he did promise to "break [the] government monopoly in all infrastructure sectors" in line with his other economically liberal policy positions. The PDP nominee's platform also vowed to accelerate infrastructural investment and, more specifically, diversify the nation's sources of power and deliver up to 25,000 MW by 2030 through "power sector reform." Review of energy infrastructure plans noted Tinubu's identification of power issues but lack of explanation on the funding sources for his proposed solutions while Abubakar's was derided for its vagueness and brevity. Obi's energy plan was praised for its structure and identification of alternative energy sources, though the viability of its wind power idea was questioned by analysts.

== Insecurity ==
The years ahead of the election were marked by a deteriorating security situation nationwide. While further advances in the fight against terrorists in the northeast led to thousands of refugees being able to return to their communities, the situation in the rest of the nation became increasingly dire: North West—the deadly bandit conflict in addition to terrorist expansion; North Central—herder-farmer and interethnic conflicts along with more terrorist expansion, Niger Delta—pirates and illegal oil bunkering gangs, and South East—a violent separatist movement. Coupled with the regional crises, the continued proliferation of kidnapping and mob violence along with an epidemic of security force brutality have affected the entire country and led to increasing reliance on vigilantes and public anger at the perceived indifference of the administration. The election itself also is affected by the security crisis as civil society groups noted the possibility for electoral violence stemming from pre-existing violent groups.

During the primaries and early general election campaign, several notable attacks (Note: Namely: the Abuja–Kaduna train attack which led to the killing and kidnapping of dozens of riders, the massacre of about 150 people in a series of bandit attacks in Plateau State, the ethnic-based and politically-motivated mass murder of over a dozen civilians by separatist militants in Anambra State, the fatal shooting of over 40 parishioners in Owo, and the ISWAP jailbreak of hundreds in the FCT signifying terrorist expansion into the North Central) led to ever-increasing focus on the security plans of major presidential candidates as the death toll mounted and violent non-state actors increased in power. For Tinubu, his longtime support for state police was expected to be the pinnacle of his security plan but it was not included in his manifesto, which instead spotlighted plans for specialized anti-terrorist battalions (ABATTS), improving community relations, and secure forested areas often used as bandit hideouts; however, analysts had noted that the failure of the Buhari administration on security could hurt Tinubu on the issue. Obi focused on security force cooperation and reform in his manifesto while noting the root causes of insecurity in speeches by highlighting his job creation plans while Abubakar similarly pitched his job creation plan while proposing more police officers along with logistical registration and alternative conflict resolution means in his policy document. Obi's commitments to reform to address security force brutality also led his campaign to receive large amounts of support from backers of the End SARS movement. Although Tinubu, Obi, Kwankwaso, and Abubakar all had long security segments in their manifestos, reporting noted the similar vagueness of their plans. Notable differences included Obi directly supporting the establishment of state police forces along with both Kwankwaso and Abubakar proposing an increase in the amount of police officers to one million.

== National unity ==
Unity and Division poll
The 2022 API Social Cohesion Survey
1. Feel that Nigeria is "Much more divided" than 2017 (66.0%)
2. Feel that Nigerian unity "stayed the same" compared to 2017 (20.0%)
3. Feel that Nigeria is "Much more united" than 2017 (10.0%)
4. "I'm not sure" (4.00%)

While polls showed low levels of affinity for the nation and high dissatisfaction with the status quo, reports also demonstrated that the vast majority of citizens feel connected to their Nigerian identity; however, the vast majority also fear for Nigerian unity. The Abubakar's campaign prioritized national unity by including it as the first of his five-point agenda while noting that "Nigeria's unity has never been threatened like now." His countermeasures focused on "co-operation and consensus" along with 'true federalism.' For Tinubu, his platform mentioned including "national unity and pride" in educational curricula while Obi's manifesto vowed to "operate a government of national unity" in accordance with the federal character principle.

== Regional identity ==
The six geopolitical zones of Nigeria.

The election marks a return to presidential elections with major candidates from around the nation after the all-Northern election in 2019. The majority of early discussion on regional identity revolved around the zoning principle and the failure of the PDP to adhere to it. While pundits noted that the regional power-sharing "federal character" principle was at times disregarded by the Buhari administration, some analysts expressed worry for a political system that normalizes regional exclusion. Further discussion centered on both major parties' failure to microzone their nominations to the South East; according to some southeastern groups, the South East should have produced the next president as it has never produced an elected president. The largest of these groups, Igbo socio-cultural organization Ohanaeze Ndigbo, accused the APC and PDP of an apparent "conspiracy" against ethnic Igbos amid other groups' calls to support Obi—a native of Anambra State.

As the campaign began, analysis reports on the candidates' prospects by region emerged with reports on if Tinubu could hold the APC's northern strength when facing a major northern opponent; similarly, questions on if Abubakar could hold the PDP's southern strength when facing two major southern opponents also took a primary role in analysis. In the search for running mate, major candidates sought to achieve regional balance as northerner Abubakar picked southerner Okowa while southerners Obi and Tinubu chose northerners Baba-Ahmed and Shettima, respectively.

During the campaign, region-based questions emerged with pundits questioning if Shettima's laudation of former dictator Sani Abacha would hurt Tinubu outside of a select few Northern areas were Abacha is not reviled; later, it was speculated that Abubakar's jingoist October statement was a play for Northern votes as Tinubu and Obi targeted the region. Additionally, questions emerged over the South as pundits noted the possibility that Obi and Abubakar could split the PDP's former southern base; there were also questions about the potential impact on southeastern turnout if separatist leader Nnamdi Kanu was released from imprisonment.

== Religious identity ==
Due to the nation's religious diversity, a key tenet of power-sharing are tickets with running mates of the different religions; however, like zoning, this principle was challenged in the lead-up to the election as allies of then-aspirant Tinubu alleged that there were a few influential Northern Christian APC politicians who could be his running mate and thus, Tinubu picked a northern Muslim instead. As Tinubu is himself Muslim, such a pick would comprise a Muslim-Muslim ticket to the anger of groups like the Christian Association of Nigeria; a same religion ticket was also noted as untimely amid a rise in religious violence, especially against Christians. However, some prominent APC politicians stated their openness to a Muslim-Muslim ticket after Tinubu became party nominee, claiming that basing the vice presidential slot on religion was tantamount to discrimination in itself and that abandoning sentiment-based politics was vital for the progression of Nigerian democracy. Despite intense opposition to a same religion ticket in June and July 2022 by civil/religious organizations and even within the APC, Tinubu picked Shettima—a fellow Muslim—anyway with an argument that qualifications should take precedence over religious affiliation. The immediate backlash was strong as Anglican, Catholic, and Pentecostal leaders all condemned the same religion ticket while civil society groups like the Middle Belt Forum and some politicians also came out against the ticket. Another mark against the same religion ticket was a leaked State Security Service memo that warned against same religion tickets using security grounds with the claim that such a ticket would "destabilise Nigeria and embolden attacks on Christian citizens" in addition to 'harbouring distrust by Christians against the presidency;' however, the Presidency denied the memo's veracity. The appearance of people wearing liturgical garments of various Christian denominations at Shettima's nomination rally on 20 July led to further backlash as observers noted the group's lack of identification; the Christian Association of Nigeria publicly challenged the APC to name the supposed clergy, the Catholic Church said the vestment-donning "bishops" were fake, and activists derided the group as paid actors with the intent of faking Christian support for the APC ticket. To compound the issues for Tinubu, prominent northern Christian APC politicians openly began to campaign against the ticket. By later in 2022, an analyst would describe the Christian backlash to the same religion ticket and ensuing increased political activity as "arguably the most sustained spell of Christian religious mobilization" since the return of democracy in 1999.

Another issue for candidates involving religion is centered on their reactions to and plans to combat religious violence. A few days before the major parties' primaries, a Christian university student named Deborah Samuel Yakubu was lynched by a mob in Sokoto after she was accused of blaspheming the Islamic prophet Muhammad. While Buhari, Osinbajo, civil society, and religious groups along with most serving national and state leaders publicly condemned the brutal murder, Tinubu remained silent and Obi did not release a statement but condemned the killing in an interview; for Abubakar, he initially tweeted a condemnation before deleting the tweet and backtracking amid reports that he feared fundamentalist backlash. These responses were derided as insensitive by critics and civil society groups as some Islamic groups justified the murder while others and more general sentiment called for punishment for the attackers.

== Social policy ==
The social position of women, people with disabilities, and other marginalized groups took a prominent position in policy debates before the election. A major point of contention in 2022 was the initial legislative rejection of constitutional amendments that mandating women seats in legislatures. While parliamentary leadership later partially rescinded the rejection, a wave of pro-equality protests swept the nation in March 2022 in a show of force from women's rights organizations. In addition to the constitutional amendments, the National Assembly stalled a key gender equality bill for years despite nearly three-quarters of Nigerians promoting gender equality. After the protests, groups have continued to push for legislation to combat inequality. For the status of LGBT Nigerians, no major campaign has openly discussed the topic and seem to conform with current discriminatory laws. People with disabilities also have pushed for fair participation in democratic processes amid discrimination with groups successfully getting wording in the new Electoral Act to guarantee accessibility during voting in line with INEC's goal of "the inclusion of PWDs in all aspects of the electoral process."

In his manifesto, Obi promised to equitably distribute of appointments to "men, women, youths, and people living with disabilities" as part of his pledge to "leverage" national diversity and give overlooked groups "an unfettered voice in governance." Similarly, Tinubu promised to back legislation mandating 35% participation for women in all governmental positions in his manifesto; however, a similar vow had been made by Buhari in his previous campaigns. The Tinubu campaign also stated that its proposed social welfare programs would "give priority access to persons with disabilities, women and young people." Despite these promises, Abdullahi Aliyu Usman—the President of the Joint National Association of Persons with Disabilities—claimed electoral campaigns had continuously overlooked the group and avoided detailing specific policy aims to benefit people with disabilities in their manifestos.

== See also ==
- 2023 Nigerian elections
- Muslim–Muslim ticket
