= Enenche Akogwu =

Nigerian journalist and cameraman

- Born: 30 March 1980; Lagos, Lagos State, Nigeria
- Died: 20 January 2012 (aged 31); Kano, Kano State, Nigeria
- Cause of death: Shooting
- Education: Benue State University
- Occupations: Journalist and cameraman
- Years active: 2006–2012
- Employer: Channels Television

Enenche Akogwu, // (30 March 1980 – 20 January 2012) was a Nigerian journalist and cameraman for Channels Television. In January 2012, he was shot and killed in Kano, Nigeria while investigating a Boko Haram bombing by an unidentified gunman. His work mainly focused on human rights, politics, and war. He covered news stories across the northern region of Nigeria.

== Early life ==
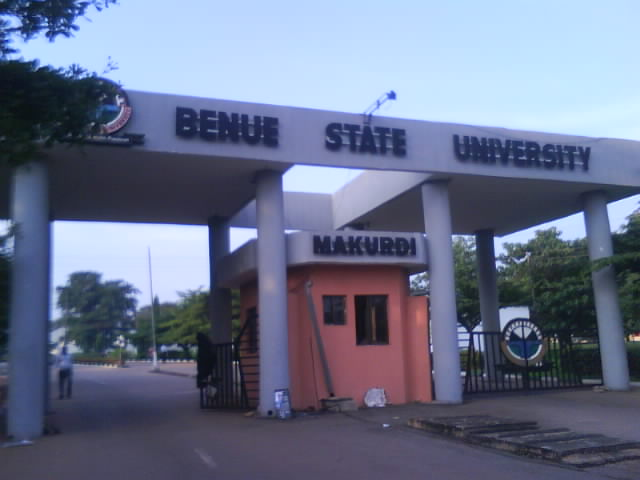
Benue State University

Akogwu was born on 30 March 1980 to Jonah and Agnes Akogwu, his father died in 2010, he assumed the responsibility of taking care of the family after his father's death. His mother said he loved being a reporter and as a kid, he would go out in the city to see what was happening and then return home to tell the family. His friend and colleague, Idris Jibrin, says that he used to go to Akogwu for advice on his own stories. Akogwu graduated from Benue State University in 2004.

== Career ==
At the time of his death, Akogwu was a reporter and camera operator for Channels Television, a privately owned station based in Lagos. His work mainly focused on human rights, politics, and war. He began working for Channels TV in 2010, as a correspondent in Abuja, the capital of Nigeria. He was later assigned to a position in Kano, Nigeria, where he worked until his passing. However, he did cover news stories all across the northern region of Nigeria.

== Death ==
Kano is located in Nigeria and shown relative to its capital city Abuja.

On 20 January 2012, Akogwu was killed at the age of 31. Earlier that day, he was at his office in Kano with his best friend and colleague, Idris Jibrin, when they heard several bomb explosions and decided to investigate. Akogwu heard that some of the bombing was taking place at the Farm Centre Police Station so he went there and approached some by-standers to get a quote. Those by-standers turned out to be Islam Militants from the terrorist group Boko Haram, who immediately shot and killed Akogwu.

When Jibrin heard about the gunfire at Farm Centre, he tried calling Akogwu's cellphone but got no answer. He headed toward the scene to see if Akogwu was alright. A by-stander told Jibrin that a journalist had been shot, so he went to the body and discovered that it was Akogwu. Akogwu had been shot six times. He was shot three times in the chest and three times in the stomach. Jibrin delivered the news to Channels Television that their journalist had been killed.

== Context ==
Akogwu had previously spent some time in Lagos, Nigeria and returned to Kano only two days before he was shot by Boko Haram. These bombings that Akogwu discussed at the conference were claimed to be the work of Boko Haram, the very same group that is now responsible for his death.

Boko Haram insurgency began in July 2009 with the 2009 Boko Haram uprising. Almost 1,000 people were killed in this fight between Boko Haram and Nigerian soldiers. Throughout 2010 and 2011, Boko Haram was responsible for several more attacks and bombings, which killed hundreds of people. Then, the group attacked Kano on 20 January 2012, killing over 170 people, including Enenche Akogwu. As of that day, this was its single most deadly attack. According to Reporters Without Borders, Akogwu was the second journalist to ever be killed by Boko Haram, the first of whom was Zakariya Isa, shot and killed in Maiduguri, Nigeria. The estimated number of deaths from the Kano attacks was discovered by reporters from the Associated Press who actually counted the bodies in the mortuary at the Murtala Muhammed Specialist Hospital. Correspondents from the private Leadership newspaper also found victims from the bombings in the mortuaries at the Aminu Kano Teaching Hospital and the Sir Muhammadu Sanusi Hospital. After these findings, the estimated total number of deaths from the Kano attacks was raised to 215.

The first attack of the day was directed toward the Nigeria Police Headquarters on Bayero University (BUK) Road. By-standers say that a suicide bomber drove a Honda Civic into the police headquarters, killing himself and three police officers. This attack was soon followed by attacks on the Zaria Road Police Station and the Farm Centre Police Station, where Akogwu was killed. It was later discovered that the immigration office in Kano was also attacked, resulting in the death of more officers. Reportedly, twenty bombs went off in Kano on 20 January 2012. At first, authorities were unsure who caused the attacks, but Boko Haram took responsibility for them, saying that its motive was to get revenge for the recent arrests of its members.

According to Vanguard News, Akogwu had previously spoken out against Boko Haram on his personal Facebook page. His rebuttal was in response to the group deciding that all northerners and Christians who lived in the northern states of Nigeria should move to different places. This applied to Akogwu because he was a Christian from Kano, which is a northern state.

== Impact ==
After Akogwu's death, his mother, Agnes Akogwu and best friend and colleague at Channels Television, Idris Jibrin, both told reporters that he was a dedicated journalist who loved his job. In an interview with Idoma Voice reporters, Agnes said that even her husband, who died two years before Akogwu, said their son would make a successful reporter.

== Reactions ==
Irina Bokova, the Director-General of UNESCO, responded to Akogwu's death and the Boko Haram attacks by saying that the "crime constitutes a serious attack on the basic human right of freedom of expression and press freedom." She also called on "the Nigerian authorities to investigate these killings."

The morning after the attacks, Red Cross officials evacuated the city of Kano and carried injured victims to safety. All hospitals in Kano were under orders from the state government to treat victims with the best care possible and to provide them with free treatment.

A coworker of Akogwu, Chika Moses, told reporters that the whole crew at Channels TV was devastated when they heard about Akogwu's death, especially when they had to deliver the news about the death of their own journalist. Just days after Nigeria learned about Akogwu's death, a picture of him wearing a vest with the word "PRESS" written in bold letters across the front spread rapidly on various blogs and social media.

Four years after Akogwu's death, his mother, Agnes Akogwu was approached by reporters from Idoma Voice. She told them she was still in disbelief. When Akogwu's father died in 2010, his mother talked to him about his career because she worried it was unsafe. Agnes said that the former senate president of Nigeria, David Mark, was very supportive after the death of her son. She also said that Channels TV and Idoma leaders were very helpful at that time and that the Benue and Kano state governments were generous enough to give her financial support. However, she did mention that there were some people who approached her at her son's burial and promised to help her other children get through school, but she had still not heard from them four years later.

After Akogwu's death, his best friend and colleague, Idris Jibrin, admitted that Nigerian Police do not perform their jobs well. He claims that they tell journalists that when they go out on the job, they go at their own risk because the police cannot protect them. Jibrin also says that even the Nigerian Union of Journalists (NUJ) does not help and protect journalists like they should. The union was asked, by email, to comment on the tragedy but never responded. Another source claims that NUJ did comment on the events of Akogwu's death by saying that "journalism in the country is hovering in a dangerous environment."Journalist, Paul Dada, also spoke out saying that the employers of reporters need to do a better job at ensuring the safety of their employees.

The day after Boko Haram attacked, Goodluck Jonathan, president of Nigeria at the time of Akogwu's death, promised that those responsible for the attacks would be brought to justice. Mohamed Keita, the Africa Advocacy coordinator for the Committee to Protect Journalists, also urged that action be taken to bring the attackers to justice. The Nigerian National Committee from the International Press Institute (IPI) recommended that the Nigerian government take action to better protect journalists in the future. In addition, IPI said that journalists should also be careful while on the job and should prioritize their own safety above their work. Reporters were unable to contact the Kano state police commissioner for comments on the evidence but instead, got a response from an official from the National Emergency Management Agency (NEMA). Yushau Shuaib from NEMA said that they were trying to save as many of the injured as they could and some NEMA officials from Kaduna even moved to Kano to help.

== See also ==
- Timeline of Boko Haram insurgency
- January 2012 Nigeria attacks
- Death of Nansok Sallah
