= Edo State Massacre =

2025 massacre in Uromi, Nigeria

- Location: 6°30′N 6°00′E
- Date: 28 March 2025
- Target: Fulani and Hausa civilians
- Attack type: Mob attack
- Weapons: Hammer, Iron rod
- Deaths: 16

The Edo State Massacre refers to a violent incident that occurred on 28 March 2025 in the Udune Efandion community of Uromi, Esan South East Local Government Area, Edo State, Nigeria. Sixteen individuals, primarily Hausa hunters from Northern Nigeria, were killed by a mob following false accusations of kidnapping. The victims were stopped by local security personnel, who found homemade weapons in their vehicle, which led to the confrontation that resulted in their deaths.

== Background and incident ==
Mob violence has been a recurring issue in Nigeria, often arising from allegations of criminal activity, witchcraft, or blasphemy. A 2024 Amnesty International report noted an increase in such incidents over the past decade, with at least 391 recorded mob-related killings between 2019 and 2022.

Edo State, located in Nigeria's South-South geopolitical zone, has experienced instances of communal and ethnic tensions, though it is also recognized for its cultural heritage and economic contributions, such as rubber production. The incident took place against the backdrop of broader security concerns in Nigeria, where travelers from different regions may sometimes face suspicion due to issues like kidnapping and banditry.

On 28 March 2025, a group of 16 Hausa hunters traveling from Port Harcourt, Rivers State, to Kano State for Sallah festivities. Around 1:30 p.m. local time, they were stopped by members of the Edo State Security Corps and local vigilantes in Udune Efandion, Uromi. During a routine search, the security personnel found Dane guns, which are traditional hunting rifles commonly used in Nigeria. The presence of these weapons led to suspicions and allegations of criminal activity, though these claims were not immediately verified.

According to reports, instead of handing the travelers over to the police, the vigilantes raised an alarm, prompting a mob to gather. The situation escalated, and the travelers were attacked, beaten, and set on fire, resulting in multiple fatalities. Videos of the incident later surfaced online, drawing widespread criticism and condemnation.

== Aftermath and reactions ==
The massacre sparked widespread condemnation. The Northern States Governors’ Forum (NSGF), led by Gombe State Governor Muhammad Inuwa Yahaya, described the killings as a "gross violation of human rights" and called for a thorough investigation and prosecution of those responsible. Nigerian president Bola Tinubu condemned the act as "dastardly," ordering security agencies to apprehend the perpetrators and emphasizing the right of Nigerians to move freely within the country.

Edo State Governor Monday Okpebholo labeled the killings "barbaric and condemnable" and directed a comprehensive investigation. The Edo State Police Command confirmed the incident and stated efforts were underway to arrest those involved.

The Arewa Youth Consultative Forum (AYCF) condemned the brutal killing of the northern travelers, calling for justice and urging the government to ensure the safety of all citizens, regardless of their origin.

Peter Obi and Atiku, Nigerian politicians, expressed sorrow over the incident, describing it as part of a troubling pattern of violence in society. They condemned the attack, stating that such acts have no place in a just and orderly society.

== Investigation and legal actions ==
The Edo State Police Command increased efforts to identify and arrest those involved in the incident. Reports indicated that more than 30 suspects were taken into custody in connection with the attack. The state government pledged a comprehensive investigation and affirmed its commitment to ensuring that those responsible would face legal consequences.

== See also ==
- List of massacres in Nigeria
