= 2013 Kano bus bombing =

Suicide attack committed against Christian civilians at the Kano bus station

Coordinates: 12.0000°N 8.5167°E

Kano bus bombing
- Part of Boko Haram insurgency
- Location: Kano, Nigeria
- Date: 18 March 2013
- Target: Buses packed with Christian civilians
- Attack type: Suicide attack, car bombing
- Weapon: Presumed to be TNT
- Deaths: 22-65
- Injuries: 65+

On 18 March 2013, a suicide attack was committed against Christian civilians at the Kano bus station, all of whom were boarding the buses to go to the mostly Christian south.

== The attack ==
On 18 March 2013 at the height of the Boko Haram insurgency , a Volkswagen Golf packed with explosives and driven by three suicide bombers sped to five buses, which were being boarded by civilians. The car hit one of the buses and exploded. After the explosion, people started evacuating from the remaining buses. A fire spread to the four remaining buses, many of which still had passengers in them.

== Casualties ==
It is speculated how many people died in the attack. Sources like the Vanguard claim the attack killed up to 60 people. BBC claims it was 22, though according to Reuters, the number is 25. Though the attacks followed a long list of incidents that indiscriminately targeted the vast majority of the Muslim populated state.

== See also ==
- Boko Haram insurgency
- January 2012 Northern Nigeria attacks
