= Yelwa massacre =

2004 religious violence in Nigeria

The Yelwa massacre was a series of related incidents of religious violence between Muslims and Christians which took place in Yelwa, Nigeria between February and May 2004. These incidents killed over 700 people. The first wave occurred on 4 February 2004 when armed men attacked Christians in Yelwa, killing more than 78, including at least 48 who were worshipping inside a church compound. The February killings inflamed tensions between the communities which had been growing since the 2001 Jos riots when conflict between Muslims and Christians resulted in 1,000 dead. Then on May 2 and 3, large numbers of well-armed Christians surrounded the town of Yelwa and killed around seven hundred Muslims. The town and many surrounding villages suffered massive destruction, and tens of thousands of people were displaced.

According to some sources, in the May violence Muslim girls were forced to eat pork and other foods forbidden to Muslims and some were raped.

== Background ==
Thousands of people have died in fighting since the passage of Sharia law in the Muslim-dominated northern region after a return to civilian rule in 1999. The origin of the conflict between the Christian Tarok and the Muslim Fulani is rooted in their competing claims over the fertile farmlands of Plateau State in central Nigeria.

== See also ==
- List of massacres in Nigeria
