= Bin Yauri =

Town in Kebbi, Nigeria

Coordinates: 10.7823°N 4.8113°E

Bin Yauri, also known as Birnin Yauri, is a town in the Ngaski Local Government Area of the Kebbi State, Nigeria. It is about 8 km to the east from River Niger which feeds the famous Kainji Reservoir and 270 km south of Sokoto State.

== Population ==
1,103 (1975), 11,501 (12.04.2018).

Area 0.859 km².

== History ==
Bin Yauri was founded by and named after the 5th Sarki of Gungu Kafa, the ruler of the Gungawa people who lived on islands in the Niger River, in the early 16th century. He expanded his kingdom through conquest, transforming it into the Yauri Emirate. The town was conquered and fortified by Queen Amina of Zazzau, who built massive walls that can still be seen today.
