= 2022 Plateau State massacres =

Mass murder and kidnapping in Nigeria

- Part of the Nigerian bandit conflict
- Location: 9°18′N 10°00′E; Kanam and Wase, Plateau State, Nigeria
- Date: April 10, 2022
- Attack type: Mass shooting, mass kidnapping, arson
- Weapons: Assault rifles, machine guns
- Deaths: 150+
- Perpetrator: Fulani bandits from Kaduna State
- Motive: Herder–farmer conflict

On 10 April 2022, a gang of bandits killed more than 150 people in a series of attacks in Plateau State, Nigeria. The attacks are linked to the ongoing Nigerian bandit conflict. About 70 people were also kidnapped in the attacks.

== Background ==
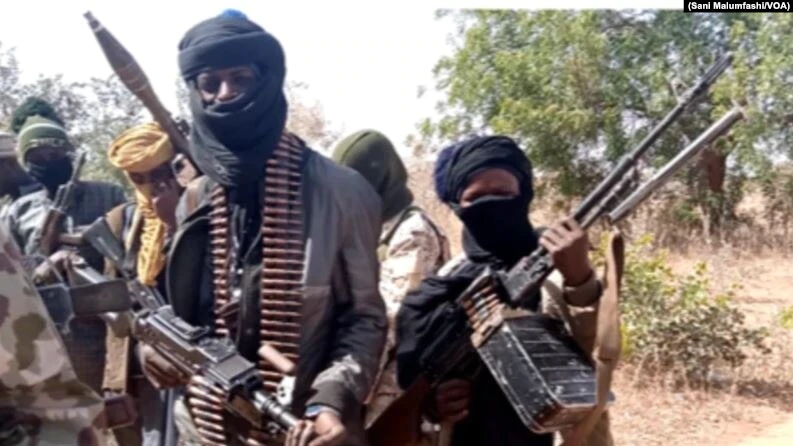
Nigerian bandits in 2021, with typical dress and weaponry

Nigeria is badly affected by several low-intensity conflicts. These include the Boko Haram insurgency, which began in 2009, and the Nigerian bandit conflict, which began in 2011.

In the early 2020s, bandit attacks increased. The week before the attack, bandits carried out a major attack on a military base in Kaduna State, killing 15 soldiers. An attack on a harvest festival that week killed 17. A few weeks before, an attack on a train bound for Kaduna killed upwards of 60 passengers.

The day of the attack, bandits killed 15 people in an unrelated incident. The massacre happened in a village in Chikun, Kaduna State. Local community leader Isiaku Madaki, who had been installed less than a day before, was among the dead.

== Attack ==
On the afternoon of 10 April 2022, a bandit gang, believed to be Fulani herdsmen, attacked nine villages in Plateau State. All the villages were in the Kanam and Wase local government areas. Gunmen killed at least 50 people and kidnapped about 70 others. They also torched and looted houses during the rampage.

Victims who died in the attacks were buried in mass graves in Kanam.

While Nigerian president Muhammadu Buhari vowed that there will be "no mercy" for the perpetrators of these attacks, leaders of the local communities called for his resignation for his failure to maintain order and security.

== Casualties ==
Initial reports and authorities said that at least 50 had been killed. Witnesses told the Associated Press that the death toll was more than 100, with others placing the estimate as high as 130. On 11 April, Voice of America stated that at least 70 people had been slain. Vanguard reported at least 78 people had been killed in Kanam and another 15 in Chikun during the attacks.

== See also ==
- List of massacres in Nigeria
