= Yauri Emirate =

Emirate of Nigeria

Coordinates: 10°44′56″N 4°46′40″E

Yauri Emirate Kasar Yauri
- Capital: Bin Yauri
- Religion: Islam
- History
  - Tafiraulu made Sarki (king) of Gungun Kafa: 1411
  - Yauri established the kingdom: 1505-1531
  - 1904: British colonial conquest

Yauri (or Yawuri) is an emirate in Nigeria's Kebbi State, occupying the Yauri Local Government Area. Today, Yauri is one of the smallest historical emirates in Northern Nigeria. In 1972, the population was about 112,000 people inhabiting a land area of about 3,380 square kilometres (1,306 sq mi) and scattered over six major districts.

== History ==
The area was first settled by an eastern group around early 1000-1200 AD, predominantly by a Benue–Congo linguistic group, the Kamberis. Then for a brief period of time, Yauri was invaded by the Songhai Empire and it incorporated a few Songhai invaders into its social structure. The increasing agricultural surplus exhibited by the early settlers and the availability of fertile land near a river brought in a diverse and malleable group of migrants seeking fertile land to farm, and the groups were initially dominated by the Gungawas. This became the second wave of migration into Yauri. In the early sixteenth century, the island-dwelling Gungawa kingdom expanded through war with the Kamberis to become the dominant political group in the area under the first Emir of Yauri, Sarkin Yauri Garba. He founded the capital of Bin Yauri and named it after himself.

However, by the eighteenth century, slave raiding had clipped the political and economic structures of the area. The need for a much more powerful political entity became necessary in order to strengthen the emirate against slave raiders from without. A movement by the ruling and malleable Gungawas to assimilate with the dominant Hausas in the region led to a gradual inter-ethnic political relationship with Hausas. However, in early nineteenth century, the success of the Fulani jihad made Yauri a tributary state of Gwandu.

Sarkin Abdullahi was a native ruler of Yauri after the disastrous rule of Aliyu, a fulani ruler. He was quite educated and was a teacher before his coronation as Sarkin. He was known for his meticulous dedication to education, health and generally most services under his emirate. He was born in 1910, and was educated at the Provincial School Kano.

== Independent rulers ==
Following is the kings list of the Yauri Emirate.

Start	End	Ruler
1411	1433	Tafiraulu
1433	1456	Kamuwa
1456	1480	Bunyagu
1480	1505	Sakazu
1505	1531	Yauri
1531	1536	Kisagari
1560	1572	Jerabana I
1572	1600	Gimba I
1600	1601	Gimba II
1601	1620	Kasafaugi
1620	1663	Jerabana II
1663	1663	Gimba III
1663	1665	Kasagurbi
1665	1666	Kana
1666	1670	Janrina
1670	1674	Dutsi
1674	1675	Lafiya
1675	1689	Kada
1689	1709	Gandi
1709	1714	Dan Ibrahim
1714	1723	Muhammadu
1723	1745	Lafiya II
1745	1745	Yanzu
1745	1748	Umaru Gandi
1748	1770	Suleiman Jarabana
1770	1773	Aliyu Lafiya
1773	1790	Amadu Jarabana
1790	1790	Shu’aibu Madara
1790	1793	Mustafa Gazari
1793	1838	Muhammadu Albashir Dan A’i
1838	1844	Ibrahim Dogon Sarki
1844	1853	Jibrin Gajeren Sarki
1853	1858	Abubakar Jatau
1858	1878	Suleiman Dan Ado
1878	1880	Yakubu Dan Gajere
1880	1890	Abdullahi Gallo
1890	1904	Abdullahi Abarshi
1904	1915	Jibrin Abarshi
1915	1923	Aliyu of Jabo
1923	1955	Abdullahi Jibrin
1955	1981	Muhammadu Tukur
1981	1999	Shu’aibu Yakubu Abarshi
1999		Dr. Muhammad Zayyanu Abdullah
