= Ogaminan =

Ogaminana Ogaminana
- town
- Ogaminana
- Location within Nigeria
- Coordinates: 7°36′N 6°12′E
- Country: Nigeria
- State: Kogi State
- Time zone: UTC+1 (WAT)
- Nigeria Postal Services: 264

Ogaminana is a larger town in Kogi State, Nigeria. It is the headquarters of the Adavi Local Government Area.

The town has an official Post Office.
