= 2000 Kaduna riots =

Religious riots in Kaduna, Nigeria

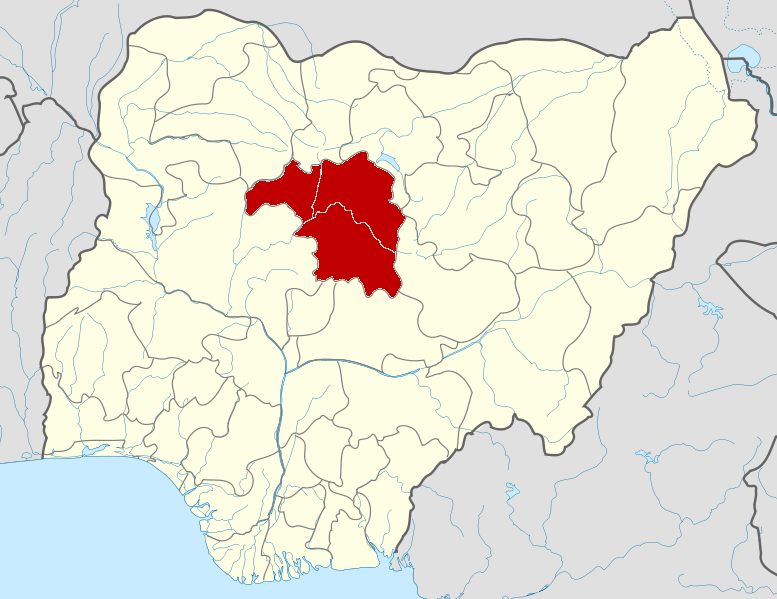
Map of Kaduna

The 2000 Kaduna riots were religious riots in Kaduna involving Christians and Muslims over the introduction of sharia law in Kaduna State, Nigeria. It is unclear how many people were killed in the fighting between Muslims and Christians, that lasted with peaceful intervals from 21 February until 23 May 2000; estimates vary from 1,000 to 5,000 deaths.

When in February 2000, the governor of Kaduna announced the introduction of sharia to Kaduna State, of which non-Muslims form almost half of the population, the Kaduna branch of the Christian Association of Nigeria (CAN) organised a public protest against it in Kaduna city. Muslim youths then clashed with them and the situation spiraled out of control, with massive violence and destruction on both sides. The violence happened in two main waves (sometimes referred to as "Sharia 1" and "Sharia 2"): a first wave from 21 to 25 February, with further killings in March, followed by a second wave from 22 to 23 May. The initial violence left more than 1,000 people dead; a judicial commission set up by the Kaduna state government reported the official death toll to be 1,295. However, Human Rights Watch estimated the total number fatalities, including those from March and May and many from February the commission had not counted, to be much higher, somewhere between 2,000 and 5,000. Several media reported a number of about or more than 2,000 deaths (and 2 to 300 deaths in May). Eventually, the army interfered to end the bloody clashes when it became clear the police could not control them.

These became the first so-called "Sharia clashes", the start of the religious riots phase of the Sharia Conflict (1999–present).

== The first wave (February 21, 2000 - February 25, 2000) ==
=== February 21 ===
On February 21, 2000, at about 6am, thousands of Christians from different parts of Kaduna including Sabo Tasha, Kakuri, Television Villiage, Angwan Sunday, and Barnawa converged and marched in protest against the proposed adoption of Shariah in Kaduna state. The protest was a response to the pro shariah rallies that had gone on from Monday to Saturday the previous week. Some of the phrases that were chanted during the protest are, "No more Shariah", "No to Shariah", and "Shariah rest in peace".

Some Christian youth broke some cars' windshields and disrupted the flow of traffic, this left many commuters with walking as their only option. Many people also closed their shops and businesses fearing that the violence may escalate.

The violence escalated further when a clash erupted at Central Market, some hoodlums had taken advantage of the protest march to raid and loot stores, which led many people to panic and run for safety. Armed policemen were later dispatched to handle the violence, but at least 3 people had already died and the fighting and burning of buildings continued.

A 6 pm to 6 am curfew was later imposed in the evening by Acting Governor, Stephen Shekari

=== February 22 ===
Despite the curfew, the killings, fighting, and burning of buildings continued. Some Policemen were deployed from Abuja, however, they were low-numbered compared to the level of violence. In Narayi Villiage, Badarawa and Tudun Wada protesters were taking people out of their houses and killing them based on their religious affiliation.

At 9:00 am, enraged youths had blocked routes from Sabon Tasha, Tudun Wada, and Kawo (which were the Southern, Northern and Western routes) to Kaduna Central (the heart of the city), This meant people could not visit or attend to their business, some essential services like banks also needed to be closed

Some journalists were hurt, and at least 3 churches and 1 mosque were burnt down.

=== February 23 ===
The leader of the Movement for the Actualization of the Sovereign state of Biafria (MASSOB), Chief Ralph Uwazuruike, reacted to what he referred to as the killings of Christians who are predominately Igbos, He threatened to mobilize Igbos in the South to retaliate against the Hausas if the Federal government fails to stop the killings of Igbos in the North. He also urged Igbo people in Kaduna to use every amount of force available to them to defend themselves.

At least 50 people had died and soldiers from the Nigeria army had been deployed in Kaduna.
