= January 2012 Northern Nigeria attacks =

Series of terrorist attacks allegedly carried out by jihadist group Boko Haram

- Part of Boko Haram insurgency
- January 2012 Northern Nigeria attacks (Nigeria)
- Location: Mubi, Yola, Gombi and Maiduguri (5–6 January); Kano, Nigeria (20 January)
- Date: 5–6 and 20 January 2012 (UTC+01:00)
- Target: Christian churches and businesses (5–6 January); Police stations, immigration offices and State Security Services' local branch office (20 January)
- Attack type: Shootings
- Deaths: 37+ (5–6 January); 185 (20 January)
- Injuries: unknown (5–6 January) at least 57 (20 January)
- Perpetrator: Boko Haram

A series of assaults on businesses occurred in northeastern Nigeria on 5 and 6 January 2012, followed by attacks on police stations and government offices in the north on 20 January. Over 180 people were killed.

== Background ==
Boko Haram, a militant group based in Borno State whose goal is to institute sharia law on all of Nigeria, has become more proficient in carrying out attacks since a 2009 clash with security forces that led to the death of its leader Ustaz Mohammed Yusuf. Since then it has either claimed or been blamed for numerous attacks on Nigerian government and civilian targets. Most attacks have been the predominantly Muslim north of Nigeria, though the group's name has been called out in other bombings such as the attacks against the United Nations HQ and the main police building in the capital city of Abuja. The group itself has since factionalised with some allied to Al Qaeda in the Islamic Maghreb and some expecting terms of agreement similar to southern Nigeria's MEND.

On 25 December 2011, Boko Haram also bombed a church in Abuja and attacked other Christian targets in northern Nigeria. Boko Haram had previously given all Christians 3 days to leave Yobe State and Borno State following the Christmas bombings. The President of Nigeria, Goodluck Jonathan, had declared a state of emergency in several towns of those states.

== 5–6 January attacks ==
Militants armed with automatic weapons stormed a town hall in the city of Mubi in Adamawa State where people had gathered to mourn 3 Christians shot on the previous evening. At least 18 people were confirmed killed by a Nigerian Red Cross official, and a separate ambush of Christians leaving a church service in the state capital of Yola left at least eight people dead. Most of the victims were ethnic Igbo.

Later in the day a spokesman for Boko Haram calling himself Abu Qaqa claimed responsibility for these two incidents and the shooting during a church service in Gombi that killed six people on Thursday. A Christian couple were also gunned down in Maiduguri, considered to be the stronghold of the radical group. Police in Yobe State later told the press they were engaged in street battles with members of Boko Haram. Hundreds of Christians started fleeing northern cities in the aftermath of the bombings and church officials urged people not to take part in revenge attacks.

== 20 January attacks ==
On 20 January after Friday prayers, a group of gunmen in police uniforms entered five police buildings and freed all of the inmates. They proceeded to bomb the buildings, as well as two immigration offices and the local office of the State Security Service in Kano. They later drove around the city in cars and motorcycles, shooting pedestrians and battling with police. Amongst the dead was television reporter Enenche Akogwu, shot while covering the aftermath of the terrorist attacks.

Boko Haram dropped letters written in Hausa at the site of the attacks, announcing that they were protesting the continued detention of Boko Haram members. They also directly contacted the press to claim responsibility for the attacks. Officials in the city responded by setting a curfew and by initiating armed patrols of major streets, though sporadic gunfire was still heard the next day.

The Kano State government ordered all hospitals in the area to treat victims free of charge. African Union chairman Jean Ping condemned the attacks and said that the Union "rejects terrorism in all its forms;" and United Nations Secretary-General Ban Ki-moon condemned the attacks as well.

On 23 January the government announced the death toll had risen to 185 people, 150 of whom were civilians and at least 32 police officers, including 3 members of the secret police. Local security forces announced they had found 10 unexploded car bombs and almost 300 smaller homemade bombs around the city. The Emir of Kano Ado Bayero and Governor Rabiu Kwankwaso then led a prayer for the victims of the attacks.

According to the website 247reports.com, a Boko Haram spokesman indicated that the attacks were carried out due to a failure by the state governments to pay protection money.

== See also ==
- Nigerian Sharia conflict
