= April 16 =

April 16 this year in various calendars
- Thursday, 16 April 2026
Other calendars
| Akan | Monoyaw |
| Armenian | 30 Ahekani 1475 |
| Aztec | Tlaxochimaco 16, 6 Cuetzpalin |
| Babylonian | 27 Adaru, 2336 SE |
| Balinese pawukon | Luang, Pepet, Kajeng, Menala, Pon, Maulu, Wraspati of Landep, Yama, Dadi, Manuh |
| Bengali | 3 Boisakh, BS 1433 |
| Chinese | Yang Metal Monkey・Legs Mansion; 29 Èryuè, Bǐngwǔnián (Qingming, 4 days until Guyu) |
| Common Era | 16 April 2026 CE |
| Coptic | 8 Parmouti, AM 1742 |
| Egyptian | 5 Epagomenae, 2774 NE |
| Ethiopian | 8 Miyāzyā, 2018 Amätä Məhrät |
| French Republican | Décade III, Septidi de Germinal de l'Année 234 de la République |
| Gregorian | 16 April, AD 2026 |
| Hebrew | 29 Nisan, AM 5786; Omer 14 |
| Hindu | Uttarabhādrapada・Indra; Solar: 3 Vaiśākha, 1948 SE; Lunisolar: Caturdaśī, Kṛishna pakṣa of Caitra, 2083 VE; Rāudra・5127 KY・1,872,681 |
| Icelandic | Fimmtudagur, 24 Einmánuður 2025 |
| Islamic | 28 Shawwal, AH 1447 (using tabular method) |
| ISO week date | 2026-W16-4 |
| Japanese | 29 Kisaragi, Reiwa 8 (Seimei, 4 days until Kokuu) |
| Julian | 3 April, AD 2026 (AM 7534) |
| Julian day | 2461147 |
| Maya | 13.0.13.9.4; 17 Pop, 6 Kan |
| Roman | ante diem III Nonas Apriles, MMDCCLXXIX AUC |
| Solar Hijri | 27 Farvardin, SH 1405 |
| Tibetan | 29 dbo, me pho rta 2153 or 1772 or 1000 |

| << | April | | | | | >> |
| Su | Mo | Tu | We | Th | Fr | Sa |
| | | | 1 | 2 | 3 | 4 |
| 5 | 6 | 7 | 8 | 9 | 10 | 11 |
| 12 | 13 | 14 | 15 | 16 | 17 | 18 |
| 19 | 20 | 21 | 22 | 23 | 24 | 25 |
| 26 | 27 | 28 | 29 | 30 |
2026

April 16 in recent years
2026 (Thursday)
2025 (Wednesday)
2024 (Tuesday)
2023 (Sunday)
2022 (Saturday)
2021 (Friday)
2020 (Thursday)
2019 (Tuesday)
2018 (Monday)
2017 (Sunday)

April 16 is the 106th day of the year (107th in leap years) in the Gregorian calendar; 259 days remain until the end of the year.

== Events ==
=== Pre-1600 ===
- 1457 BC – Battle of Megiddo: The first battle to have been recorded in what is accepted as relatively reliable detail.
- 69 – Defeated by Vitellius' troops at Bedriacum, Roman emperor Otho commits suicide.
- 73 – Masada, a Jewish fortress, falls to the Romans after several months of siege, ending the First Jewish–Roman War.
- 556 – Pope Pelagius I is consecrated following Imperial approval by Emperor Justinian I.
- 682 – Pope Leo II is elected head of the Catholic Church, although he will not be consecrated until 17 August.
- 1346 – Stefan Dušan, "the Mighty", is crowned Emperor of the Serbs at Skopje, his empire occupying much of the Balkans.
- 1520 – The Revolt of the Comuneros begins in Spain against the rule of Charles V.
- 1582 – Spanish conquistador Hernando de Lerma founds the settlement of Salta, Argentina.

=== 1601–1900 ===
- 1746 – The Battle of Culloden is fought between the French-supported Jacobites and the British Hanoverian forces commanded by William Augustus, Duke of Cumberland, in Scotland.
- 1780 – Franz Friedrich Wilhelm von Fürstenberg founds the University of Münster.
- 1797 – The Spithead mutiny begins, immobilising the Channel fleet.
- 1799 – French Revolutionary Wars: The Battle of Mount Tabor: Napoleon drives Ottoman Turks across the River Jordan near Acre.
- 1818 – The United States Senate ratifies the Rush–Bagot Treaty, limiting naval armaments on the Great Lakes and Lake Champlain.
- 1838 – The French Army captures Veracruz in the Pastry War.
- 1847 – Shooting of a Māori by an English sailor results in the opening of the Wanganui Campaign of the New Zealand Wars.
- 1853 – The Great Indian Peninsula Railway opens the first passenger rail in India, from Bori Bunder to Thane.
- 1858 – The Wernerian Natural History Society, a former Scottish learned society, is dissolved.
- 1862 – American Civil War: Battle at Lee's Mills in Virginia.
- 1862 – American Civil War: The District of Columbia Compensated Emancipation Act, a bill ending slavery in the District of Columbia, becomes law.
- 1863 – American Civil War: During the Vicksburg Campaign, gunboats commanded by acting Rear Admiral David Dixon Porter run downriver past Confederate artillery batteries at Vicksburg.
- 1878 – The Senate of the Grand Duchy of Finland issues a declaration establishing a city of Kotka on the southern part islands from the old Kymi parish.
- 1881 – In Dodge City, Kansas, Bat Masterson fights his last gun battle.

=== 1901–present ===
- 1908 – Natural Bridges National Monument is established in Utah.
- 1910 – The oldest indoor ice hockey arena used for the sport in the 21st century, Boston Arena, opens for the first time.
- 1912 – Harriet Quimby becomes the first woman to fly an airplane across the English Channel.
- 1917 – Russian Revolution: Vladimir Lenin returns to Petrograd, Russia, from exile in Switzerland.
- 1919 – Mohandas Gandhi organizes a day of "prayer and fasting" in response to the killing of Indian protesters in the Jallianwala Bagh massacre by the British colonial troops three days earlier.
- 1919 – Polish–Lithuanian War: The Polish Army launches the Vilna offensive to capture Vilnius in modern Lithuania.
- 1922 – The Treaty of Rapallo, pursuant to which Germany and the Soviet Union re-establish diplomatic relations, is signed.
- 1925 – During the Communist St Nedelya Church assault in Sofia, Bulgaria, 150 are killed and 500 are wounded.
- 1941 – World War II: The Italian-German Tarigo convoy is attacked and destroyed by British ships.
- 1941 – World War II: The Nazi-affiliated Ustaše is put in charge of the Independent State of Croatia by the Axis powers after Operation 25 is effected.
- 1943 – Albert Hofmann accidentally discovers the hallucinogenic effects of the research drug LSD. He intentionally takes the drug three days later on April 19.
- 1944 – World War II: Allied forces start bombing Belgrade, killing about 1,100 people. This bombing fell on the Orthodox Christian Easter.
- 1945 – World War II: The Red Army begins the final assault on German forces around Berlin, with nearly one million troops fighting in the Battle of the Seelow Heights.
- 1945 – World War II: The United States Army liberates Nazi Sonderlager (high security) prisoner-of-war camp Oflag IV-C (better known as Colditz).
- 1945 – World War II: More than 7,000 die when the German transport ship Goya is sunk by a Soviet submarine.
- 1947 – An explosion on board a freighter in port causes Texas City in the state of Texas, United States, to catch fire, killing almost 600 people.
- 1947 – Bernard Baruch first applies the term "Cold War" to describe the relationship between the United States and the Soviet Union.
- 1948 – The Organization of European Economic Co-operation is formed.
- 1961 – In a nationally broadcast speech, Cuban leader Fidel Castro declares that he is a Marxist–Leninist and that Cuba is going to adopt Communism.
- 1963 – U.S. civil rights campaigner Dr. Martin Luther King Jr. writes his open letter from Birmingham Jail, sometimes known as "The Negro Is Your Brother", while incarcerated in Birmingham, Alabama, for protesting against segregation.
- 1972 – Apollo program: The launch of Apollo 16 from Cape Canaveral, Florida.
- 2001 – India and Bangladesh begin a five-day border conflict, but are unable to resolve the disputes about their border.
- 2003 – The Treaty of Accession is signed in Athens admitting ten new member states to the European Union.
- 2007 – Virginia Tech shooting: Seung-Hui Cho murders 32 people and injures 17 before committing suicide.
- 2008 – The U.S. Supreme Court rules in the Baze v. Rees decision that execution by lethal injection does not violate the Eighth Amendment ban against cruel and unusual punishment.
- 2012 – The trial for Anders Behring Breivik, the perpetrator of the 2011 Norway attacks, begins in Oslo, Norway.
- 2012 – The Pulitzer Prize winners are announced. It was the first time since 1977 that no book won the Fiction Prize.
- 2013 – A 7.8-magnitude earthquake strikes Sistan and Balochistan province, Iran, killing at least 35 people and injuring 117 others.
- 2013 – The 2013 Baga massacre is started when Boko Haram militants engage government soldiers in Baga.
- 2014 – The South Korean ferry MV Sewol capsizes and sinks near Jindo Island, killing 304 passengers and crew and leading to widespread criticism of the South Korean government, media, and shipping authorities.
- 2016 – Ecuador's worst earthquake in nearly 40 years kills 676 and injures more than 230,000.
- 2018 – The New York Times and The New Yorker win the Pulitzer Prize for Public Service for breaking news of the Harvey Weinstein sexual abuse scandal.
- 2024 – The historic Børsen in Copenhagen, Denmark, is severely damaged by a fire.

== Births ==
=== Pre-1600 ===
- 1488 – Jungjong of Joseon (died 1544)
- 1495 – Petrus Apianus, German mathematician and astronomer (died 1557)
- 1516 – Tabinshwehti, Burmese king (died 1550)
- 1569 – John Davies, English poet and lawyer (died 1626)

=== 1601–1900 ===
- 1635 – Frans van Mieris the Elder, Dutch painter (died 1681)
- 1646 – Jules Hardouin-Mansart, French architect (probable; (died 1708)
- 1660 – Hans Sloane, Irish-English physician and academic (died 1753)
- 1661 – Charles Montagu, 1st Earl of Halifax, English poet and politician, First Lord of the Treasury (died 1715)
- 1682 – John Hadley, English mathematician, invented the octant (died 1744)
- 1697 – Johann Gottlieb Görner, German organist and composer (died 1778)
- 1728 – Joseph Black, French-Scottish physician and chemist (died 1799)
- 1730 – Henry Clinton, English general and politician (died 1795)
- 1755 – Louise Élisabeth Vigée Le Brun, French painter (died 1842)
- 1786 – John Franklin, English admiral and politician, fourth Lieutenant Governor of Van Diemen's Land (died 1847)
- 1800 – George Bingham, 3rd Earl of Lucan, English field marshal and politician (died 1888)
- 1808 – Caleb Blood Smith, American journalist, lawyer, and politician, sixth United States Secretary of the Interior (died 1864)
- 1812 – Juraj Dobrila, Croatian bishop and national revivalist (died 1882)
- 1821 – Ford Madox Brown, French-English soldier and painter (died 1893)
- 1823 – Gotthold Eisenstein, German mathematician and academic (died 1852)
- 1826 – Sir James Corry, 1st Baronet, British politician (died 1891)
- 1827 – Octave Crémazie, Canadian poet and bookseller (died 1879)
- 1839 – Antonio Starabba, Marchese di Rudinì, Italian politician, 12th Prime Minister of Italy (died 1908)
- 1834 – Charles Lennox Richardson, English merchant (died 1862)
- 1844 – Anatole France, French journalist, novelist, and poet, Nobel Prize laureate (died 1924)
- 1847 – Hans Auer, Swiss-Austrian architect, designed the Federal Palace of Switzerland (died 1906)
- 1848 – Kandukuri Veeresalingam, Indian author and activist (died 1919)
- 1851 – Ponnambalam Ramanathan, Sri Lankan lawyer and politician, third Solicitor General of Sri Lanka (died 1930)
- 1865 – Harry Chauvel, Australian general (died 1945)
- 1866 – José de Diego, Puerto Rican journalist, lawyer, and politician (died 1918)
- 1867 – Wilbur Wright, American inventor (died 1912)
- 1871 – John Millington Synge, Irish author, poet, and playwright (died 1909)
- 1874 – Jōtarō Watanabe, Japanese general (died 1936)
- 1878 – R. E. Foster, English cricketer and footballer (died 1914)
- 1882 – Seth Bingham, American organist and composer (died 1972)
- 1884 – Ronald Barnes, 3rd Baron Gorell, English cricketer, journalist, and politician (died 1963)
- 1885 – Leó Weiner, Hungarian composer and educator (died 1960)
- 1886 – Michalis Dorizas, Greek-American football player and javelin thrower (died 1957)
- 1886 – Ernst Thälmann, German politician (died 1944)
- 1888 – Billy Minter, English footballer and manager (died 1940)
- 1889 – Charlie Chaplin, English actor, director, producer, screenwriter, and composer (died 1977)
- 1890 – Fred Root, English cricketer and umpire (died 1954)
- 1890 – Gertrude Chandler Warner, American author and educator (died 1979)
- 1891 – Dorothy P. Lathrop, American author and illustrator (died 1980)
- 1892 – Dora Richter, German transgender woman and the first known person to undergo complete male-to-female gender-affirming surgery (died 1966)
- 1892 – Howard Mumford Jones, American author, critic, and academic (died 1980)
- 1893 – Germaine Guèvremont, Canadian journalist and author (died 1968)
- 1893 – John Norton, American hurdler (died 1979)
- 1895 – Ove Arup, English-Danish engineer and businessman, founded Arup (died 1988)
- 1896 – Árpád Weisz, Hungarian footballer (died 1944)
- 1899 – Osman Achmatowicz, Polish chemist and academic (died 1988)
- 1900 – Polly Adler, Russian-American madam and author (died 1962)

=== 1901–present ===
- 1903 – Paul Waner, American baseball player and manager (died 1965)
- 1904 – Fifi D'Orsay, Canadian-American vaudevillian, actress, and singer (died 1983)
- 1905 – Frits Philips, Dutch businessman (died 2005)
- 1907 – Joseph-Armand Bombardier, Canadian inventor and businessman, founded Bombardier Inc. (died 1964)
- 1907 – August Eigruber, Austrian-German politician (died 1947)
- 1908 – Ellis Marsalis, Sr., American businessman and activist (died 2004)
- 1908 – Ray Ventura, French jazz bandleader (died 1979)
- 1910 – Berton Roueché, American journalist and author (died 1994)
- 1911 – Guy Burgess, English-Russian spy (died 1963)
- 1914 – John Hodiak, American actor (died 1955)
- 1916 – Behçet Necatigil, Turkish author, poet, and translator (died 1979)
- 1917 – Victoria Eugenia Fernández de Córdoba, 18th Duchess of Medinaceli (died 2013)
- 1918 – Spike Milligan, Indian-Irish actor, comedian, and writer (died 2002)
- 1919 – Merce Cunningham, American dancer and choreographer (died 2009)
- 1919 – Nilla Pizzi, Italian singer (died 2011)
- 1919 – Pedro Ramírez Vázquez, Mexican architect (died 2013)
- 1920 – Ananda Dassanayake, Sri Lankan politician (died 2012)
- 1920 – Prince Georg of Denmark (died 1986)
- 1921 – Wolfgang Leonhard, German historian and author (died 2014)
- 1921 – Peter Ustinov, English actor, director, producer, and screenwriter (died 2004)
- 1922 – Kingsley Amis, English novelist, poet, and critic (died 1995)
- 1922 – Lawrence N. Guarino, American colonel (died 2014)
- 1922 – Leo Tindemans, Belgian politician, 43rd Prime Minister of Belgium (died 2014)
- 1923 – Warren Barker, American composer (died 2006)
- 1923 – Arch A. Moore Jr., American sergeant, lawyer, and politician, 28th Governor of West Virginia (died 2015)
- 1924 – Henry Mancini, American composer and conductor (died 1994)
- 1924 – Madanjeet Singh, Indian diplomat, author, and philanthropist (died 2013)
- 1926 – Pierre Fabre, French pharmacist, founded Laboratoires Pierre Fabre (died 2013)
- 1927 – Edie Adams, American actress and singer (died 2008)
- 1927 – Pope Benedict XVI (died 2022)
- 1927 – Rolf Schult, German actor (died 2013)
- 1928 – Night Train Lane, American football player (died 2002)
- 1929 – Roy Hamilton, American singer (died 1969)
- 1929 – Ralph Slatyer, Australian biologist and ecologist (died 2012)
- 1930 – Herbie Mann, American flute player and composer (died 2003)
- 1931 – Julian Carroll, American politician, 54th Governor of Kentucky (died 2023)
- 1932 – Maury Meyers, American lawyer and politician (died 2014)
- 1933 – Marcos Alonso Imaz, Spanish footballer (died 2012)
- 1933 – Joan Bakewell, English journalist and author
- 1933 – Vera Krepkina, Russian long jumper (died 2023)
- 1934 – Robert Stigwood, Australian producer and manager (died 2016)
- 1934 – Barrie Unsworth, Australian politician, 36th Premier of New South Wales
- 1934 – Vicar, Chilean cartoonist (died 2012)
- 1935 – Marcel Carrière, Canadian director and screenwriter
- 1935 – Sarah Kirsch, German poet and author (died 2013)
- 1935 – Lennart Risberg, Swedish boxer (died 2013)
- 1935 – Dominique Venner, French journalist and historian (died 2013)
- 1935 – Bobby Vinton, American singer
- 1936 – Vadim Kuzmin, Russian physicist and academic (died 2015)
- 1937 – Gert Potgieter, South African hurdler and coach
- 1937 – George Steele, American wrestler and actor (died 2017)
- 1939 – Dusty Springfield, English singer and record producer (died 1999)
- 1940 – Benoît Bouchard, Canadian academic and politician, 18th Canadian Minister of Transport
- 1940 – David Holford, Barbadian cricketer (died 2022)
- 1940 – Fotis Kafatos, Greek biologist, founding president of the European Research Council (ERC) (died 2017).
- 1940 – Queen Margrethe II of Denmark
- 1942 – Nikos Gioutsos, Greek footballer (died 2023)
- 1942 – Sir Frank Williams, English businessman, founded the Williams F1 Racing Team (died 2021)
- 1943 – Petro Tyschtschenko, Austrian-German businessman
- 1943 – John Watkins, Australian cricketer
- 1945 – Tom Allen, American lawyer and politician
- 1945 – Stefan Grossman, American acoustic fingerstyle guitarist and singer
- 1946 – Margot Adler, American journalist and author (died 2014)
- 1946 – Johnnie Lewis, Liberian lawyer and politician, 18th Chief Justice of Liberia (died 2015)
- 1947 – Kareem Abdul-Jabbar, American basketball player and coach
- 1947 – Gerry Rafferty, Scottish singer-songwriter (died 2011)
- 1948 – Reg Alcock, Canadian businessman and politician, 17th Canadian President of the Treasury Board (died 2011)
- 1950 – David Graf, American actor (died 2001)
- 1950 – Colleen Hewett, Australian singer and actress
- 1951 – Ioan Mihai Cochinescu, Romanian author and photographer
- 1952 – Michel Blanc, French actor and director (died 2024)
- 1952 – Esther Roth-Shahamorov, Israeli sprinter and hurdler
- 1952 – Bill Belichick, American football coach
- 1953 – Peter Garrett, Australian singer-songwriter and politician
- 1954 – Ellen Barkin, American actress
- 1954 – John Bowe, Australian racing driver
- 1954 – Mike Zuke, Canadian ice hockey player
- 1955 – Henri, Grand Duke of Luxembourg
- 1956 – David M. Brown, American captain, pilot, and astronaut (died 2003)
- 1956 – T Lavitz, American keyboard player, composer, and producer (died 2010)
- 1956 – Lise-Marie Morerod, Swiss skier
- 1957 – Patricia De Martelaere, Belgian philosopher, author, and academic (died 2009)
- 1958 – Tim Flach, English photographer and director
- 1958 – Ulf Wakenius, Swedish guitarist
- 1959 – Alison Ramsay, English-Scottish field hockey player and lawyer
- 1960 – Wahab Akbar, Filipino politician (died 2007)
- 1960 – Rafael Benítez, Spanish footballer and manager
- 1960 – Pierre Littbarski, German footballer and manager
- 1961 – Jarbom Gamlin, Indian lawyer and politician, seventh Chief Minister of Arunachal Pradesh (died 2014)
- 1962 – Anna Dello Russo, Italian journalist
- 1963 – Saleem Malik, Pakistani cricketer
- 1963 – Jimmy Osmond, American singer
- 1964 – Esbjörn Svensson, Swedish pianist (died 2008)
- 1965 – Yves-François Blanchet, Canadian politician
- 1965 – Jon Cryer, American actor, director, producer, and screenwriter
- 1965 – Martin Lawrence, German-American actor, director, producer, and screenwriter
- 1966 – Jarle Vespestad, Norwegian drummer
- 1968 – Vickie Guerrero, American wrestler and manager
- 1968 – Rüdiger Stenzel, German runner
- 1969 – Patrik Järbyn, Swedish skier
- 1969 – Fernando Viña, American baseball player and sportscaster
- 1970 – Dero Goi, German singer-songwriter and drummer
- 1970 – Margreth Olin, Norwegian filmmaker
- 1971 – Cameron Blades, Australian rugby player
- 1971 – Selena, American singer-songwriter, actress, and fashion designer (died 1995)
- 1971 – Seigo Yamamoto, Japanese racing driver
- 1971 – Natasha Zvereva, Belarusian tennis player
- 1972 – Conchita Martínez, Spanish-American tennis player
- 1973 – Akon, Senegalese-American singer, rapper and songwriter
- 1973 – Charlotta Sörenstam, Swedish golfer
- 1973 – Teddy Cobeña, Spanish-Ecuadorian expressionist and representational sculptor
- 1976 – Lukas Haas, American actor and musician
- 1976 – Kelli O'Hara, American actress and singer
- 1977 – Freddie Ljungberg, Swedish footballer
- 1979 – Christijan Albers, Dutch racing driver
- 1979 – Lars Börgeling, German pole vaulter
- 1979 – Daniel Browne, New Zealand rugby player
- 1981 – Anestis Agritis, Greek footballer
- 1982 – Gina Carano, American mixed martial artist and actress
- 1982 – Boris Diaw, French basketball player
- 1983 – Marié Digby, American singer-songwriter, guitarist, and actress
- 1983 – Cat Osterman, American softball player
- 1984 – Claire Foy, English actress
- 1984 – Tucker Fredricks, American speed skater
- 1984 – Paweł Kieszek, Polish footballer
- 1984 – Kerron Stewart, Jamaican sprinter
- 1985 – Luol Deng, Sudanese-English basketball player
- 1985 – Nate Diaz, American mixed martial artist
- 1985 – Brendon Leonard, New Zealand rugby player
- 1985 – Katerina Stikoudi, Greek singer, actress, TV host, model, businesswoman, former champion swimmer and beauty pageant titleholder.
- 1985 – Taye Taiwo, Nigerian footballer
- 1986 – Shinji Okazaki, Japanese footballer
- 1986 – Peter Regin, Danish ice hockey player
- 1986 – Epke Zonderland, Dutch gymnast
- 1987 – Cenk Akyol, Turkish basketball player
- 1987 – Aaron Lennon, English international footballer
- 1988 – Kyle Okposo, American ice hockey player
- 1990 – Reggie Jackson, American basketball player
- 1990 – Vangelis Mantzaris, Greek basketball player
- 1990 – Tony McQuay, American sprinter
- 1991 – Nolan Arenado, American baseball player
- 1991 – Kim Kyung-jung, South Korean footballer
- 1992 – Brian Poe Llamanzares, Filipino journalist and politician
- 1993 – Chance the Rapper, American rapper
- 1993 – Mirai Nagasu, Japanese-American figure skater
- 1996 – Anya Taylor-Joy, Argentine-British actress
- 1996 – Taylor Townsend, American tennis player
- 2002 – Sadie Sink, American actress

== Deaths ==
=== Pre-1600 ===
- AD 69 – Otho, Roman emperor (born AD 32)
- 665 – Fructuosus of Braga, French archbishop and saint
- 1090 – Sikelgaita, duchess of Apulia (born c. 1040)
- 1113 – Sviatopolk II of Kiev (born 1050)
- 1118 – Adelaide del Vasto, regent of Sicily, mother of Roger II of Sicily, queen of Baldwin I of Jerusalem
- 1198 – Frederick I, Duke of Austria (born 1175)
- 1234 – Richard Marshal, 3rd Earl of Pembroke (born 1191)
- 1375 – John Hastings, 2nd Earl of Pembroke, English nobleman and soldier (born 1347)
- 1496 – Charles II, Duke of Savoy (born 1489)
- 1587 – Anne Seymour, Duchess of Somerset (born 1497)

=== 1601–1900 ===
- 1640 – Countess Charlotte Flandrina of Nassau (born 1579)
- 1645 – Tobias Hume, Scottish soldier, viol player, and composer (born 1569)
- 1687 – George Villiers, 2nd Duke of Buckingham, English poet and politician, Lord Lieutenant of the West Riding of Yorkshire (born 1628)
- 1689 – Aphra Behn, English author and playwright (born 1640)
- 1742 – Stefano Benedetto Pallavicino, Italian poet and translator (born 1672)
- 1756 – Jacques Cassini, French astronomer (born 1677)
- 1783 – Christian Mayer, Czech astronomer and educator (born 1719)
- 1788 – Georges-Louis Leclerc, Comte de Buffon, French mathematician, cosmologist, and author (born 1707)
- 1828 – Francisco Goya, Spanish-French painter and illustrator (born 1746)
- 1846 – Domenico Dragonetti, Italian bassist and composer (born 1763)
- 1850 – Marie Tussaud, French-English sculptor, founded the Madame Tussauds Wax Museum (born 1761)
- 1859 – Alexis de Tocqueville, French historian and philosopher, French Minister of Foreign Affairs (born 1805)
- 1879 – Bernadette Soubirous, French nun and saint (born 1844)
- 1888 – Zygmunt Florenty Wróblewski, Polish physicist and chemist (born 1845)
- 1899 – Emilio Jacinto, Filipino journalist and activist (born 1875)

=== 1901–present ===
- 1904 – Maximilian Kronberger, German poet and author (born 1888)
- 1904 – Samuel Smiles, Scottish-English author (born 1812)
- 1914 – George William Hill, American astronomer and mathematician (born 1838)
- 1915 – Nelson W. Aldrich, American businessman and politician (born 1841)
- 1916 – George Wilbur Peck, American politician, 17th Governor of Wisconsin (born 1840)
- 1925 – Stefan Nerezov, Bulgarian general (born 1867)
- 1930 – José Carlos Mariátegui, Peruvian journalist, philosopher, and activist (born 1894)
- 1935 – Panait Istrati, Romanian journalist and author (born 1884)
- 1937 – Jay Johnson Morrow, American military engineer and politician, third Governor of the Panama Canal Zone (born 1870)
- 1938 – Steve Bloomer, English footballer and manager (born 1874)
- 1941 – Josiah Stamp, 1st Baron Stamp, English economist and civil servant (born 1880)
- 1942 – Princess Alexandra of Saxe-Coburg and Gotha (born 1878)
- 1942 – Denis St. George Daly, Irish polo player (born 1862)
- 1946 – Arthur Chevrolet, Swiss-American racing driver and engineer (born 1884)
- 1947 – Rudolf Höss, German SS officer, commandant of Auschwitz, convicted war criminal (born 1900)
- 1950 – Eduard Oja, Estonian composer, conductor, and critic (born 1905)
- 1950 – Anders Peter Nielsen, Danish target shooter (born 1867)
- 1955 – David Kirkwood, Scottish engineer and politician (born 1872)
- 1957 – Pieter van der Hoog, Dutch bacteriologist, dermatologist, and Islamicist (born 1888)
- 1958 – Rosalind Franklin, English biophysicist and academic (born 1920)
- 1960 – Mihály Fekete, Hungarian actor, screenwriter and film director (born 1884)
- 1961 – Carl Hovland, American psychologist and academic (born 1912)
- 1965 – Sydney Chaplin, English actor, comedian, brother of Charlie Chaplin (born 1885)
- 1966 – Eric Lambert, Australian author (born 1918)
- 1968 – Fay Bainter, American actress (born 1893)
- 1968 – Edna Ferber, American novelist, short story writer, and playwright (born 1885)
- 1969 – Hem Vejakorn, Thai illustrator and painter (born 1904)
- 1970 – Richard Neutra, Austrian-American architect, designed the Los Angeles County Hall of Records (born 1892)
- 1970 – Péter Veres, Hungarian politician, Hungarian Minister of Defence (born 1897)
- 1972 – Yasunari Kawabata, Japanese novelist and short story writer, Nobel Prize laureate (born 1899)
- 1972 – Frank O'Connor, Australian public servant (born 1894)
- 1973 – István Kertész, Hungarian conductor and educator (born 1929)
- 1978 – Lucius D. Clay, American officer and military governor in occupied Germany (born 1898)
- 1980 – Morris Stoloff, American composer (born 1898)
- 1985 – Scott Brady, American actor (born 1924)
- 1988 – Khalil al-Wazir, Palestinian commander, founded Fatah (born 1935)
- 1988 – Youri Egorov, Russian pianist (born 1954)
- 1989 – Jocko Conlan, American baseball player and umpire (born 1899)
- 1989 – Kaoru Ishikawa Japanese author and educator (born 1915)
- 1989 – Miles Lawrence, English cricketer (born 1940)
- 1989 – Hakkı Yeten, Turkish footballer, manager and president (born 1910)
- 1991 – David Lean, English director, producer, and screenwriter (born 1908)
- 1992 – Neville Brand, American actor (born 1920)
- 1992 – Alexandru Nicolschi, Romanian spy and activist (born 1915)
- 1992 – Andy Russell, American singer and actor (born 1919)
- 1994 – Paul-Émilien Dalpé, Canadian labor unionist (born 1919)
- 1994 – Ralph Ellison, American novelist and critic (born 1913)
- 1996 – Lucille Bremer, American actress and dancer (born 1917)
- 1997 – Esmeralda Arboleda Cadavid, Colombian politician (born 1921)
- 1997 – Roland Topor, French actor, director, and painter (born 1938)
- 1998 – Alberto Calderón, Argentinian-American mathematician and academic (born 1920)
- 1998 – Fred Davis, English snooker player (born 1913)
- 1998 – Marie-Louise Meilleur, Canadian super-centenarian (born 1880)
- 1999 – Skip Spence, Canadian-American singer-songwriter and guitarist (born 1946)
- 2001 – Robert Osterloh, American actor (born 1918)
- 2002 – Billy Ayre, English footballer and manager (born 1952)
- 2002 – Ruth Fertel, American businesswoman, founded Ruth's Chris Steak House (born 1927)
- 2002 – Robert Urich, American actor (born 1946)
- 2005 – Kay Walsh, English actress, singer, and dancer (born 1911)
- 2007 – Frank Bateson, New Zealand astronomer (born 1909)
- 2007 – Gaétan Duchesne, Canadian ice hockey player (born 1962)
- 2007 – Maria Lenk, Brazilian swimmer (born 1915)
- 2007 – Chandrabose Suthaharan, Sri Lankan journalist
- 2008 – Edward Norton Lorenz, American mathematician and meteorologist (born 1917)
- 2009 – Michael Martin Dwyer, Irish security guard (born 1984)
- 2009 – Eduardo Rózsa-Flores, Bolivian-Hungarian-Croatian mercenary, journalist, and actor (born 1960)
- 2010 – Rasim Delić, Bosnian general and convicted war criminal (born 1949)
- 2011 – Gerry Alexander, Jamaican cricketer and veterinarian (born 1928)
- 2011 – Allan Blakeney, Canadian scholar and politician, tenth Premier of Saskatchewan (born 1925)
- 2011 – Sol Saks, American screenwriter and producer (born 1910)
- 2012 – Sári Barabás, Hungarian soprano (born 1914)
- 2012 – George Kunda, Zambian lawyer and politician, 11th Vice-President of Zambia (born 1956)
- 2012 – Mærsk Mc-Kinney Møller, Danish businessman (born 1913)
- 2012 – Carlo Petrini, Italian footballer and coach (born 1948)
- 2013 – Ali Kafi, Algerian politician (born 1928)
- 2013 – Siegfried Ludwig, Austrian politician, 18th Governor of Lower Austria (born 1926)
- 2013 – Pentti Lund, Finnish-Canadian ice hockey player (born 1925)
- 2013 – George Beverly Shea, Canadian-American singer-songwriter (born 1909)
- 2013 – Pat Summerall, American football player and sportscaster (born 1930)
- 2013 – Pedro Ramírez Vázquez, Mexican architect, designed the Tijuana Cultural Center and National Museum of Anthropology (born 1919)
- 2014 – Gyude Bryant, Liberian businessman and politician (born 1949)
- 2014 – Aulis Rytkönen, Finnish footballer and manager (born 1929)
- 2014 – Ernst Florian Winter, Austrian-American historian and political scientist (born 1923)
- 2015 – Valery Belousov, Russian ice hockey player and coach (born 1948)
- 2015 – Stanislav Gross, Czech lawyer and politician, fifth Prime Minister of the Czech Republic (born 1969)
- 2018 – Harry Anderson, American actor and magician (born 1952)
- 2021 – Andrew Peacock, Australian politician (born 1939)
- 2021 – Helen McCrory, British actress (born 1968)
- 2021 – Liam Scarlett, British choreographer (born 1986)
- 2021 – John Dawes, Welsh rugby union player (born 1940)
- 2024 – Carl Erskine, American baseball player (born 1926)
- 2024 – Bob Graham, American lawyer, author, and politician, 38th governor of Florida (born 1936)
- 2025 – Nora Aunor, Filipino actress and recording artist (born 1953)
- 2026 – Justin Fairfax, American lawyer and politician, 41st Lieutenant Governor of Virginia (born 1979)
- 2026 – Alex Manninger, Austrian footballer (born 1977)

== Holidays and observances ==
- Christian feast day:
  - Benedict Joseph Labre
  - Bernadette Soubirous
  - Drogo
  - Engratia
  - Fructuosus of Braga
  - Isabella Gilmore (Church of England)
  - Martyrs of Zaragoza
  - Molly Brant (Konwatsijayenni) (Anglican Church of Canada, Episcopal Church)
  - Turibius of Astorga
  - April 16 (Eastern Orthodox liturgics)
- Birthday of José de Diego (Puerto Rico, United States)
- Birthday of Queen Margrethe II (Denmark)
- Flag Day (Jordan)
- Emancipation Day (Washington, D.C., United States)
- Memorial Day for the Victims of the Holocaust (Hungary)
- National Healthcare Decisions Day (United States)
- Remembrance of Chemical Attack on Balisan and Sheikh Wasan (Iraqi Kurdistan)
- World Voice Day
