= Baga massacre =

The Baga massacre may refer to one of two massacres, both carried out, in part or in whole, by jihadist group Boko Haram in the vicinity of the town of Baga in Nigeria's Borno State:

- 2013 Baga massacre, in which 35–200+ people were killed
- 2015 Baga massacre, in which 150–2,200+ people were killed
