= 1999 Bayelsa State gubernatorial election =

1999 gubernatorial election in Bayelsa State, Nigeria

- January 9, 1999
Nominee	DSP Alamieyesiegha	Francis Doukpola
Party	PDP	All People's Party (Nigeria)
Running mate	Goodluck Jonathan
Popular vote	324,463	269,233
Governor before election
Paul Obi
Nigerian military junta
Elected Governor
DSP Alamieyeseigha
PDP

The 1999 Bayelsa State gubernatorial election occurred in Nigeria on January 9, 1999. The PDP nominee Diepreye Alamieyeseigha won the election, defeating the APP candidate, Francis Doukpola, and two others to become Bayelsa State's first elected governor.

Diepreye Alamieyeseigha won the PDP nomination at the primary election. He picked Goodluck Jonathan as his running mate.

== Electoral system ==
The Governor of Bayelsa State is elected using the plurality voting system.

== Results ==
PDP's DSP Alamieyesiegha emerged winner in the contest.

The total number of registered voters in the state for the election was 873,000. However, 897,500 were previously issued voting cards in the state.

Candidate	Party	Votes	%
Diepreye Solomon Peter Alamieyeseigha	People's Democratic Party (PDP)	324,463	54.46
Francis Doukpola	All People's Party (APP)	269,233	45.19
Alliance for Democracy (AD)	2,089	0.35	
Total		595,785	100.00
Registered voters/turnout		873,000	–
Source: Nigeria World, IFES
