= 2013 Mainok raids =

- Part of Boko Haram insurgency
Date	25–26 October 2013
Location	Near Galangi and Lawanti, near Mainok, Borno State, Nigeria
Result	Nigerian victory

Belligerents
Nigeria	Boko Haram

Casualties and losses
2 injured (per Nigeria)	95 killed (per Nigeria); Unknown injured

Between 25 and 26 October 2013, clashes broke out between Nigerian forces and Boko Haram militants in the forest near Mainok, Borno State, Nigeria. At least 95 militants were killed in the clashes, compared to two Nigerian soldiers being injured.

== Background ==
Boko Haram emerged in 2009 as a jihadist social and political movement in a failed rebellion in northeast Nigeria. Throughout the following years, Abubakar Shekau unified militant Islamist groups in the region and continued to foment the rebellion against the Nigerian government, conducting terrorist attacks and bombings in cities and communities across the region. Boko Haram often has its camps and bases in forested areas across rural Borno and Yobe States, which the Nigerian government raided several times throughout the year. These raids, notably at Alagarno and the Kasiya Forest, killed many militants. The town of Benisheik had been attacked by Boko Haram militants just over a month prior, killing over 100 civilians.

== Battle ==
Nigerian officials reported that their forces stormed Boko Haram camps near Mainok on 25 October. The camps were located in the villages of Galangi and Lawanti, near Mainok. The attacks combined ground and aerial forces. Initial reports from Nigerian army spokesman Muhammad Dole stated that two Nigerian soldiers were injured in the clashes, and that 74 militants were killed. Dole also said that two pick-ups were seized and five were destroyed. Other injured militants fled the scene. The following day, reports of a second camp being stormed were reported by the Nigerian Army, with the death toll for the militants increasing to 95.
