= Omoniyi Caleb Olubolade =

Nigerian military administrator (1954–2025)

Administrator and 3rd Governor of Bayelsa State
- In office 27 June 1997 – 9 July 1998
- Preceded by: Habu Daura
- Succeeded by: Paul Obi

Federal Minister of Special Duties
- In office 6 April 2010 – 2015

Personal details
- Born: 30 November 1954 Ipoti-Ekiti, Federation of Nigeria
- Died: 11 May 2025 (aged 70) Apapa, Lagos, Nigeria

Military service
- Allegiance: Nigeria
- Branch/service: Nigerian Navy
- Rank: Navy Captain

Navy Captain Omoniyi Caleb Olubolade (30 November 1954 – 11 May 2025) was a Nigerian military administrator of Bayelsa State who was appointed minister of special duties on 6 April 2010, when acting president Goodluck Jonathan announced his new cabinet.

== Life and career ==
Olubolade was born on 30 November 1954 at Ipoti-Ekiti, now in Ijero LGA of Ekiti State. He was commissioned into the Nigerian Navy in 1974, and attended courses including the Britannia Royal Naval College, UK in 1975 and the Naval College of Engineering, India in 1979. On 9 June 1997, he was appointed military administrator of the newly created Bayelsa State by the military government of General Sani Abacha. As governor, on 4 May 1998, he established the Bayelsa State Council for Arts & Culture. Olubolade retired from the Nigerian Navy in 1999 at the start of the new democratic regime (Fourth Republic).

In April 2006, Olubolade was briefly arrested during a House of Representatives by-election in the Ekiti South II Federal Constituency. He was an aspirant to become Action Congress (AC) candidate for governor of Ekiti State in the April 2007 elections. Later in 2006, he defected to the People's Democratic Party (PDP). He was appointed chairman of the Ekiti State Project Monitoring Committee by Governor Segun Oni. Olubolade was a frontrunner in the Ekiti state governorship race 2014 election, under the Peoples Democratic Party. Olubolade formally declared his governorship ambition on Saturday, 22 February 2014, at the PDP state secretariat Ado Ekiti. On 11 May 2025, Olubolade died aged 70.

Olubolade died at a hospital in Apapa, Lagos, on 11 May 2025, at the age of 70. He had been playing lawn tennis at a local facility when he suffered a medical emergency, and despite others' efforts, could not be saved.
