= 2003 Bayelsa State gubernatorial election =

2003 gubernatorial election in Bayelsa State, Nigeria

- (Nigeria)
- April 19, 2003
Nominee	DSP Alamieyeseigha	Millionaire Abowei
Party	PDP	ANPP
Running mate	Goodluck Jonathan
Popular vote	698,644
Percentage	93.93%
Governor before election
DSP Alamieyeseigha
PDP
Elected Governor
DSP Alamieyeseigha
PDP

The 2003 Bayelsa State gubernatorial election occurred on April 19, 2003. Incumbent Governor, PDP's Diepreye Alamieyeseigha won election for a second term, defeating ANPP's Millionaire Abowei and two other candidates.

Diepreye Alamieyeseigha won the PDP nomination at the primary election. He retained Goodluck Jonathan as his running mate.

== Electoral system ==
The Governor of Bayelsa State is elected using the plurality voting system.

== Results ==
A total of four candidates registered with the Independent National Electoral Commission to contest in the election. Incumbent Governor, DSP Alamieyesiegha won election for a second term, defeating four other candidates.

The total number of registered voters in the state was 765,472. About 97.38% (i.e. 745,408) of registered voters participated in the exercise.

Candidate	Party	Votes	%
Diepreye S. P. Alamieyesiegha	People's Democratic Party (PDP))	698,644	100.00
Millionaire Abowei	All Nigeria Peoples Party (ANPP)		
Alliance for Democracy (AD)			
George Fente	United Nigeria People's Party (UNPP)		
Total		698,644	100.00
Registered voters/turnout		765,472	–
Source: Gamji, Africa Update, Dawodu
