= Battle of Gashua =

- Part of Boko Haram insurgency
Date	24 April 2013
Location	Gashua, Yobe State, Nigeria
Result	Nigerian victory

Belligerents
Nigeria	Boko Haram

Casualties and losses
5 killed	20 killed

On 24 April 2013, Nigerian forces repelled a Boko Haram attack on the city of Gashua, Yobe State, Nigeria.

== Background ==
Boko Haram emerged in 2009 as a jihadist social and political movement in a failed rebellion in northeast Nigeria. Throughout the following years, Abubakar Shekau unified militant Islamist groups in the region and continued to foment the rebellion against the Nigerian government, conducting terrorist attacks and bombings in cities and communities across the region. Two days before the Gashua attack, Boko Haram militants attacked Nigerian forces in Baga.

== Battle ==
On the night of 24 April, Boko Haram militants attacked a Nigerien police station in the city of Gashua. The attack began at midnight, and residents stated that fighting lasted for several hours. Local authorities stated that the death toll was 25, including five police officers and 20 rebels. Yobe State police representative Sanusi Rifai said that the attackers left with nine million naira ($57,000 USD in 2013) and two vehicles.
