= Habu Daura =

Nigerian politician

Administrator and 2nd Governor of Bayelsa State (Acting)
- In office 28 February 1997 – 27 June 1997
- Preceded by: Phillip Ayeni
- Succeeded by: Omoniyi Caleb Olubolade

Police Commissioner Habu Daura was briefly acting Administrator of Bayelsa State, Nigeria, holding office from February to June 1997, during the military regime of General Sani Abacha. In 1999, Nuhu Ribadu, then a legal officer in the Police Force's Intelligence and Investigation Bureau, recommended that Daura be prosecuted for allegedly blocking investigations into cases of armed robbery in 1999. Daura was retired from the police force.

President Umaru Yar'Adua appointed Daura to the Police Service Commission (PSC) in 2008 as a permanent member. Ribadu, who had been appointed chairman of the Economic and Financial Crimes Commission by president Olusegun Obasanjo and later dismissed by Yar'Adua, described Daura as the most unqualified and unsuitable person, referring to his earlier recommended prosecution of Daura. The PSC had recently demoted Ribadu from an Assistant Inspector-General of Police to a Deputy Commissioner of Police.

Daura led the PSC monitoring team during the February 2010 elections in Anambra State. His report said that the police behaved well, but that ballot boxes were removed at some polling stations.
