= Battle of Alagarno =

- Part of Boko Haram insurgency
Date	21 October 2013
Location	Alagarno, Borno State, Nigeria
Result	Nigerian victory

Belligerents
Nigeria	Boko Haram

Units involved
Nigerian Army: 7th Division; Nigerian Air Force: 79th Composite Group	Unknown

Casualties and losses
None	37 killed Several injured

On 21 October 2013, clashes broke out between Boko Haram militants and Nigerian forces in Alagarno, Borno State, Nigeria.

== Background ==
Boko Haram emerged in 2009 as a jihadist social and political movement in a failed rebellion in northeast Nigeria. Throughout the following years, Abubakar Shekau unified militant Islamist groups in the region and continued to foment the rebellion against the Nigerian government, conducting terrorist attacks and bombings in cities and communities across the region. In September 2013, Nigerian forces launched an offensive against a major Boko Haram camp in the Kasiya Forest, leading to over 100 militant deaths, but the survivors began targeting Nigerian soldiers nearby in the days that followed. Alagarno is a remote village where Boko Haram had been active.

== Battle ==
Nigerian forces launched an offensive against a Boko Haram camp in Alagarno on the night of 21 October. The attack was carried out by the 7th Division of the Nigerian Army with the aid of the 79th Composite Group of the Air Force based in Maiduguri. A spokesman for the 7th Division stated that 37 jihadists were killed, and many others were wounded and fled during the battle. The battle involved ground and aerial assaults.

== Aftermath ==
Despite the Nigerian seizure of the camp, Boko Haram militants maintained a presence near Alagarno. On 13 November, nine militants were killed by army forces along the Rimanti-Alagarno road.
