= Phillip Ayeni =

Phillip Oladipo Ayen

Administrator and 1st Governor of Bayelsa State
- In office 1 October 1996 – 28 February 1997
- Succeeded by: Habu Daura

Personal details
- Born: February 1949
- Died: 21 April 2017 (aged 68)

Navy Captain Phillip Oladipo Ayeni (February 1949 – 21 April 2017) was the first Administrator of Bayelsa State, Nigeria after it had been formed from part of Rivers State, holding office from October 1996 to February 1997 during the military regime of General Sani Abacha.
