= Battles of the Kasiya Forest =

- Part of Boko Haram insurgency
Date	12–13 September 2013
Location	Kasiya Forest, Borno State, Nigeria
Result	Nigerian victory (1st battle); Boko Haram victory (2nd battle)

Belligerents
Nigeria	Boko Haram

Commanders and leaders
Unknown	Abba Goroma †

Units involved
7th Division: 81st Battalion; 12th Brigade: 134th Battalion	Unknown

Casualties and losses
Total: 56 killed, 74 missing 1st battle: 16 killed, 9 missing 2nd battle: 40 killed, 65 missing	150+ killed

On 12 and 13 September 2013, Nigerian forces stormed a Boko Haram camp in the Kasiya forest in northeast Borno State, Nigeria, killing around 150 militants and sixteen soldiers. The day afterward, the surviving Boko Haram militants ambushed a different group of Nigerian soldiers on the outskirts of the Kasiya forest near Kangarwa, killing 40 soldiera and leaving 65 others missing.

== Background ==
Boko Haram emerged in 2009 as a jihadist social and political movement in a failed rebellion in northeast Nigeria. Throughout the following years, Abubakar Shekau unified militant Islamist groups in the region and continued to foment the rebellion against the Nigerian government, conducting terrorist attacks and bombings in cities and communities across the region. The area around the Kasiya forest had been a known Boko Haram hub of activity, with the group using their base in the forest to kill 40 Nigerian soldiers in Gashua in May. The base itself was extremely well-defended and highly fortified.

== Battles ==
Nigerian officials stated that the battle began when Nigerian troops infiltrated the camp on the night of 12 September. These troops were part of the 81st Battalion of the 7th Division of the Nigerian Army. These troops had aerial support, and the battle at Kasiya lasted for several hours. The militants, caught by surprise, shot wildly at the Nigerian soldiers. The militants were forced to desert the camp. Nigerian officials said that over 150 militants were killed during the battle, along with sixteen Nigerian soldiers. Of the soldiers, one officer and a lieutenant were killed. Nine more soldiers were also missing. A top Boko Haram commander, Abba Goroma, was killed as well.

The battle was a major victory for Nigerian forces after several hefty losses against Boko Haram. In the days following the attack, the surviving militants began ambushes on Nigerian soldiers in the Kasiya forest. At least 40 soldiers from the 134th Battalion of the 12th Brigade were killed and 65 others missing by the militants on 13 September after no aerial support showed up. The Nigerian army denied the existence of this attack.
