= Teddy Cobeña =

Teddy Cobeña Loor
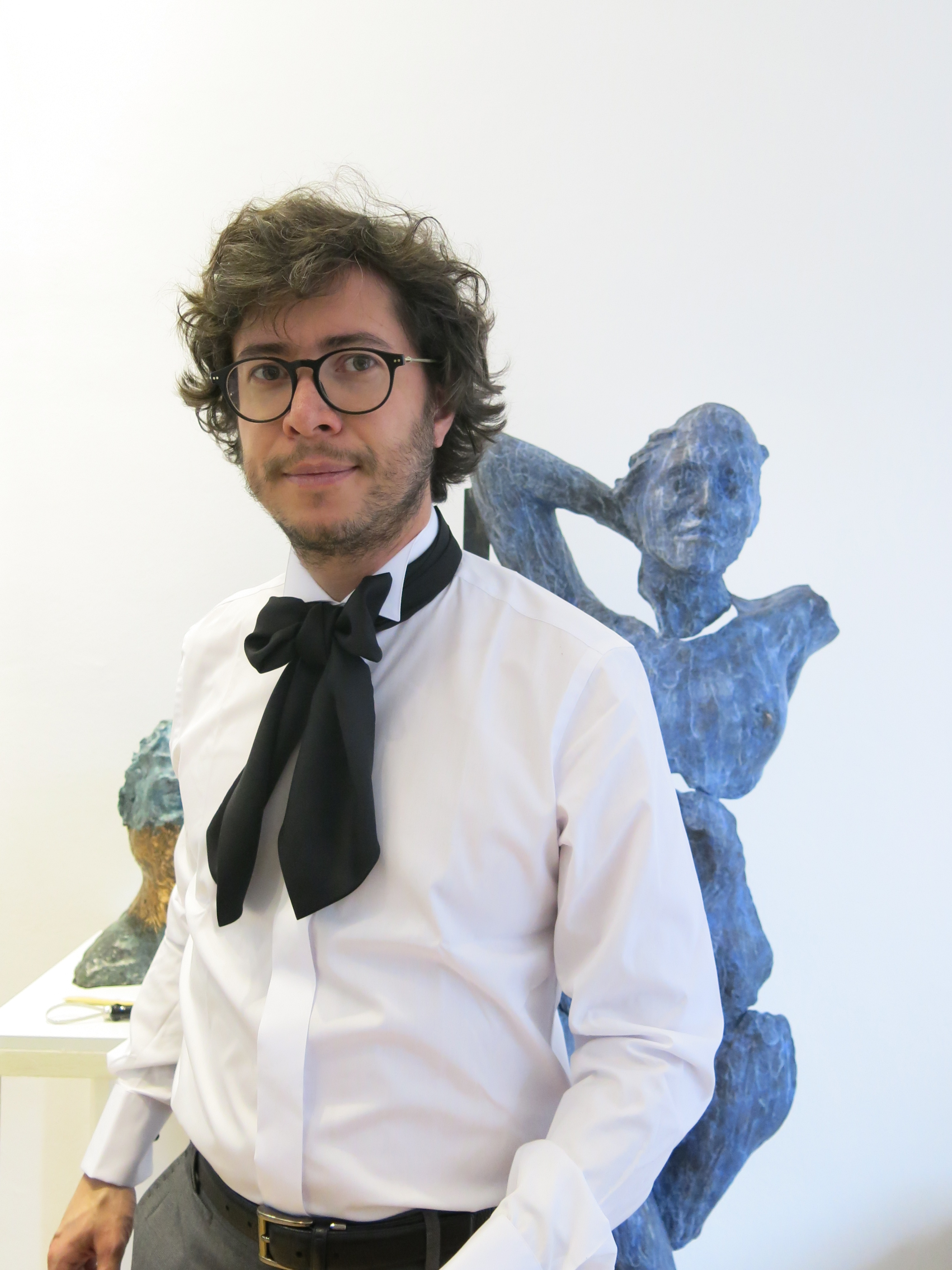
- Born: April 16, 1973 (age 53); Portoviejo, Ecuador
- Education: University of Barcelona University of Guayaquil Massana School
- Known for: sculptor
- Movement: Contemporary art Expressionism Surrealism
- Awards: "Leonardo Martínez Bueno" Medal (Spain); "Mateo Inurria" Medal (Spain); International bronze price Aigle de Nice (France); International prize "Ville de Nice" (France); International Art Prize of Hyogo (Japan)
- Website: http://www.teddycobena.eu

Teddy Cobeña Loor (born 16 April 1973) is a figurative expressionist sculptor with a surrealist component. He lives in Barcelona.

== Biography ==
He was born in Portoviejo, the son of David Cobeña Vinces and Judith Loor Rodríguez. In his adolescence, he was interested in the study of anatomy and had in the family bookcase a biography of Leonardo da Vinci. He began his studies of medicine in Guayaquil and ends his formation in Barcelona as a radiologist and in preventive medicine; there he begins at the same time a formation in sculpture at Massana School, Barcelona Academy of Art and Florence Academy of Art.

His bronze work "The dreams" is in the Palazzo Panciatichi in Florence, at the museum of the government of Tuscany (Italy) since June 2013.

In November 2016 and 2018 he received the international sculpture awards "Aigle de Bronze" and "Villa de Nice" in France, on the occasion of the 28th "Aigle de Nice" Fine Arts Exhibition.

In the opening of the exhibition Renaissance in Rome (2015) he referred to the positive sensations when seeing, touching or hearing an artwork as sensorrealism, a word that has been used in some art platforms and exhibitions. the most important of these has been in Japan where the Hyogo Government awarded him with the International Art Prize in June 2017.

== Work ==
His work is characteristically figurative, initially influenced by Jean-Baptista Carpeaux and later by the dalinian surrealism. In most of his sculptures the expressionist style and also surrealism is noted.

He combines the patinas in many of his bronze sculptures resulting in a range of colors.

== Awards ==
- "Leonardo Martínez Bueno" Medal (Spain)
- "Mateo Inurria" Medal (Spain)
- Distinction of Honor of the Spanish Association of sculptors (Spain)
- International Bronze Price Aigle de Nice (France)
- Price "Ville de Nice" (France)
- International Prize Hyogo of Art (Japan)
- Pont-de-Chéruy Medal (France)

== Selected exhibitions ==
- 2014 - Solidart. Consiglio de la Toscana, Florence (Italy)
- 2015 - L'art contemporain. Galeries du Musée de Louvre of Paris (France)
- 2015 - Renaixement. Rome (Italy)
- 2016 - Collective presentation 51 Queen Sofia, Madrid (Spain)
- 2016 - "Aigle de Nice" (France)
- 2017 - Exhibition 52 Queen Sofia, Madrid (Spain)
- 2017 - Surealism & Sensorealism, Kobe (Japan)
