= Paul Obi =

Nigerian politician

Paul Edor Obi

Administrator and 4th Governor of Bayelsa State
- In office 9 July 1998 – 29 May 1999
- Preceded by: Omoniyi Caleb Olubolade
- Succeeded by: Diepreye Alamieyeseigha

Paul Edor Obi is a Nigerian retired lieutenant colonel who served as military administrator of Bayelsa State from July 1998 to May 1999, during the transitional regime of General Abdulsalami Abubakar.

== Early career ==
Obi graduated from the U.S. Army Aviation School in Fort Rucker, Alabama, and earned a Higher Diploma in Aviation Technology. He also graduated from the Armed Forces Command and Staff College, Jaji. He served in the military for over 23 years. He was a platoon commander under the United Nations Interim Force in Lebanon.

== Bayelsa State administrator ==
Obi was appointed military administrator of Bayelsa State in July 1998. On 11 December 1998, demonstrators marched towards Government House in Yenagoa to convey their grievances. Troops opened fire, killing some and injuring many others. Following continued civil disturbances, on 30 December 1998 he declared a state of emergency, suspending all civil liberties and imposing a dusk-to-dawn curfew. The Niger Delta Volunteer Force (NDVF) leaders described this as an "outright declaration of war on the Ijaws". The curfew was lifted on 4 January 1999 after the government "deployed warships and more troops in Niger Delta areas to quell violent protests by restive Ijaw youths".

Obi was a member of the Niger Delta Development Option Committee, which prepared the initial blueprint for development of the Niger Delta region. In April 1999 he met with selected Ijaw leaders at state house in Yenagoa. He said the Federal Government wanted to help develop the state, and urged the people to "embrace the path of peace and dialogue at all times". He handed over to the elected civilian governor Diepreye Alamieyeseigha at the start of the Nigerian Fourth Republic on 29 May 1999.

== Later career ==
After retiring, Obi became a security consultant and was chairman/chief executive officer of Pauliza Limited. He was appointed to the board of directors of several companies, including United Mortgage, Standard Alliance Insurance, Concert Alliance, Next Generation Wireless, Rode & Roke and Lagos Business School Alumni.

He was arraigned over alleged fraud in March 2022.
