= Goodluck Jonathan =

President of Nigeria from 2010 to 2015

His Excellency Goodluck Jonathan GCFR GCON
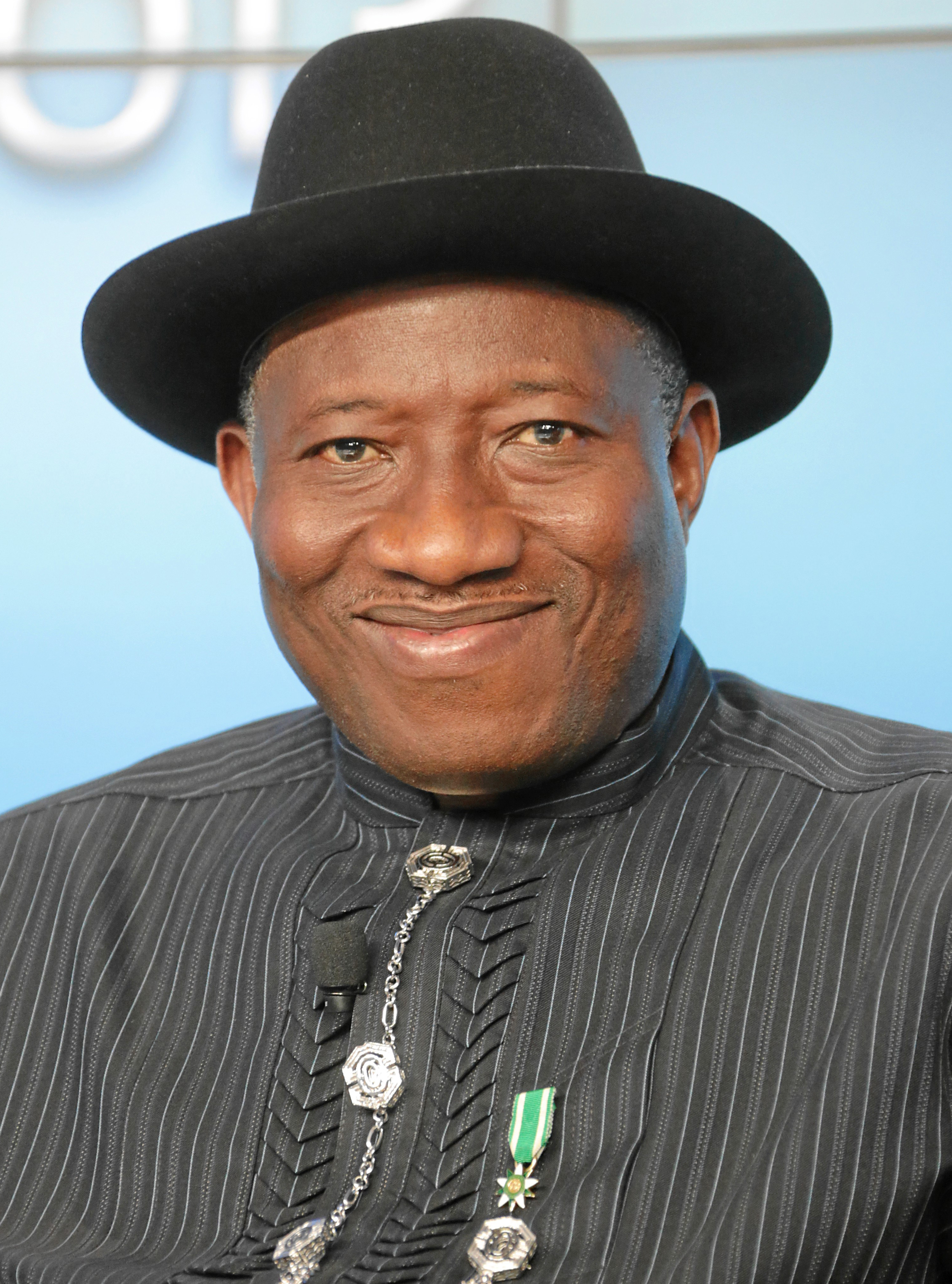
- Jonathan at the World Economic Forum in 2013

14th President of Nigeria
- In office 6 May 2010 – 29 May 2015; Acting: 9 February 2010 – 6 May 2010
- Vice President: Namadi Sambo
- Preceded by: Umaru Yar'Adua
- Succeeded by: Muhammadu Buhari

12th Vice President of Nigeria
- In office 29 May 2007 – 6 May 2010
- President: Umaru Yar'Adua
- Preceded by: Atiku Abubakar
- Succeeded by: Namadi Sambo

6th Governor of Bayelsa
- In office 9 December 2005 – 29 May 2007
- Preceded by: Diepreye Alamieyeseigha
- Succeeded by: Timipre Sylva

Deputy Governor of Bayelsa
- In office 29 May 1999 – 9 December 2005
- Governor: Diepreye Alamieyeseigha

Personal details
- Born: Goodluck Ebele Azikiwe Jonathan; 20 November 1957 (age 68) Ogbia, Eastern Region, British Nigeria (now Ogbia, Bayelsa State, Nigeria)
- Party: Peoples Democratic Party
- Spouse(s): Patience Jonathan; Ayima Lott-Jonathan
- Children: 2
- Education: University of Port Harcourt (BS, MS, PhD)
- Occupation: Politician

Goodluck Ebele Azikiwe Jonathan GCFR GCON (born 20 November 1957) is a Nigerian politician who served as the president of Nigeria from 2010 to 2015. He lost the 2015 presidential election to former military head of state General Muhammadu Buhari and was the first incumbent president in Nigerian history to lose re-election.

He was named Azikiwe by his grandmother in honor of Nigeria’s first President Dr. Nnamdi Azikiwe. Previously, Jonathan served as the vice president of Nigeria from 2007 to 2010 under the administration of Umaru Musa Yar'Adua; and in oil-rich Bayelsa State as governor from 2005 to 2007, and deputy governor from 1999 to 2005. In 2015, Jonathan became the first Nigerian president to concede election defeat. It allowed the transfer of power to the opposition party in Africa's biggest democracy—a country that had hitherto experienced vote-rigging and violence.

== Early life and education ==
Jonathan was born on 20 November 1957 in Ogbia to a Christian Ijaw family of canoe makers, in Otuoke, Bayelsa State. His father, Lawrence Ebele Jonathan, was a canoe maker and his mother, Eunice Ayi Ebele Jonathan, was a retired farmer. Their middle name Ebele or Ebelechukwu is of Igbo origin of the Igbo people. He attended a Christian primary and secondary school. Jonathan received a bachelor's degree in zoology (second-class honours), a master's degree in hydrobiology and fisheries biology; and a doctorate in zoology from the University of Port Harcourt. During his time in the university, he taught at Rivers State College of Education from 1983 to 1993.

== Pre-presidency (1998–2010) ==
Before entering into politics in 1998, Jonathan worked as an education inspector, a lecturer and an environmental-protection officer. His political career began when he became involved with the nascent People's Democratic Party (PDP) in the late 1990s. Jonathan entered into politics when General Sani Abacha, who ruled as military head of state of Nigeria from 1993 to 1998, died in office. In the 1999 Bayelsa State gubernatorial election, Diepreye Alamieyeseigha ran for governor under the platform of the Peoples Democratic Party and chose Jonathan as his running mate. Alamieyeseigha won the election and became the first civilian governor of Bayelsa State in May 1999. They were reelected in 2003.

=== Governorship ===
On 29 May 1999, Jonathan was sworn in as deputy governor of Bayelsa alongside Diepreye Alamieyeseigha who came in as the governor of the state on the platform of PDP. Jonathan served as Deputy Governor until December 2005. On 9 December 2005, Jonathan, who was the deputy governor at the time, was sworn in as the governor of Bayelsa State upon the removal of governor Diepreye Alamieyeseigha by the Bayelsa State House of Assembly after being charged with money laundering in the United Kingdom.

== Vice-presidency (2007–2010) ==
As Vice President, Jonathan took a very low profile. While recognising the constitutional limits of the Vice President's office, he participated in cabinet meetings and, by statute, was a member of the National Security Council, the National Defence Council, the Federal Executive Council and chairman of the National Economic Council.

=== Order of succession ===
Jonathan was named Acting President of Nigeria on 9 February 2010, following a controversial doctrine of necessity from the Senate of Nigeria due to President Yar'Adua's trip to Saudi Arabia in November 2009 for medical treatment. On 10 February 2010, his first day as acting president, Jonathan announced a minor cabinet reshuffle.

In accordance with the order of succession in the Nigerian constitution, following President Yar'Adua's death on 5 May 2010, Jonathan, as Acting President, was sworn in as the substantive president of the Federal Republic of Nigeria on 6 May 2010. On 18 May 2010, the National Assembly approved Jonathan's nomination of Kaduna State Governor Namadi Sambo, to replace him as vice president. For the general election in 2011, Jonathan and Vice President Sambo attended political events and travelled the country to campaign for the nation's highest office.

On 29 May 2011, he was sworn in as the President of Nigeria and Commander-in-Chief of the Armed Forces of Nigeria, becoming Nigeria's 14th Head of State. He gave his inauguration address where he declared his government was to focus on a Transformation Agenda and promised to continue implementing the seven-point agenda policy framework of President Yar'Adua. He cited anti-corruption, power and electoral reforms as focuses of his administration. He stated that he came to office under "very sad and unusual circumstances".

== Presidency (2010–2015) ==
=== Economics ===
Under Jonathan's administration, Nigeria rebased its gross domestic product for the first time in over a decade, becoming the largest economy in Africa by overtaking South Africa and Egypt. The Jonathan administration accrued over US$454 billion while in office from oil revenue. Jonathan previously served as an assistant director at the Oil Mineral Producing Areas Development commission between 1993 and 1998.

The Jonathan administration oversaw the construction of new railways in the country, including the Abuja-Kaduna railway, and conceptualized high-speed rail projects. It also managed the construction and beautification of several federal roads, including the Lagos-Benin Expressway, Abuja-Lokoja Expressway, Enugu-Abakiliki Expressway, Onitsha-Owerri Highway, and most parts of the Enugu-Port Harcourt Expressway. His administration also oversaw the construction of the second Niger Bridge between Onitsha and Asaba, which helped relieve the pressure on the old 1965 Niger Bridge, as well as the construction of airports across the country. The Akanu Ibiam Airport in Enugu was upgraded to an international airport, directly connecting the South-East region to the outside world for the first time since independence.

On 2 August 2010, Jonathan launched his 'Roadmap for Power Sector Reform'. Its primary goal was to achieve stable electricity supply in Nigeria. The Power Holding Company of Nigeria, which acted as the nation's electricity provider, was broken up into 15 firms, with Nigeria handing over control of state electricity assets to 15 private bidding companies. The Nigerian government contracted for the services of CPCS Transcom, a Canada-based consulting firm specialising in transportation and energy infrastructure projects, to act as the transaction adviser for the handover of state electricity assets.

Historically, the Nigerian power sector has been plagued by blackouts, mainly due to poor maintenance, theft, and a lack of government oversight rooted in corruption. Economists estimate that power outages have cost Nigeria, Africa's biggest economy, billions of dollars in imported diesel for generators and lost output. In a study conducted by the World Bank, a lack of access to financing and electricity were cited as Nigeria's main obstacles to development, surpassing corruption.

=== Finances ===
Jonathan suspended Sanusi Lamido Sanusi as governor of the Central Bank of Nigeria after a series of public investigations and raising the alarm on the US$20 billion NNPC scandal in a leaked letter which revealed that the Nigeria National Petroleum Corporation failed to account for US$48.9 billion of government oil revenue to the central bank – the NNPC has a history of financial irregularities and oversees the corrupt petroleum industry in Nigeria. Sanusi would go on to reveal the extent of financial recklessness that Nigeria lost a billion dollars a month to diversion of public funds under the Jonathan administration, with oil minister Diezani Alison-Madueke diverting $6 billion (₦1.2 trillion) from the Nigerian treasury.

In addition, Jonathan was alleged to have personally ordered over ₦3 trillion ($15 billion) from the Central Bank of Nigeria to support his election and other self-serving projects under the guise of an intervention fund for national security. Charles Soludo, a professor of economics and former governor of the Central Bank of Nigeria, equated Jonathan's financial recklessness to that of former Ugandan president Idi Amin. Ngozi Okonjo-Iweala, an economist and former Finance Minister of Nigeria, pegged Jonathan's administration as the main cause of Nigeria's economic woes in a lecture at George Washington University, although she later denied it.

=== Corruption ===
Jonathan's government has largely been described as corrupt. According to The Economist, corruption flourished under the Jonathan administration, "who let politicians and their cronies fill their pockets with impunity." Large sums of money have been used improperly multiple times, with ₦3.98 trillion (US$20 billion) allegedly going missing and ₦398 billion ($2 billion) of military funds allegedly dispersed amongst high-ranking officials. In 2006, reports released by Wikileaks claimed that Jonathan's wife, Patience Jonathan, was indicted for money-laundering by Nigeria's anti-crime agency, the Economic and Financial Crimes Commission (EFCC).

=== Foreign affairs ===
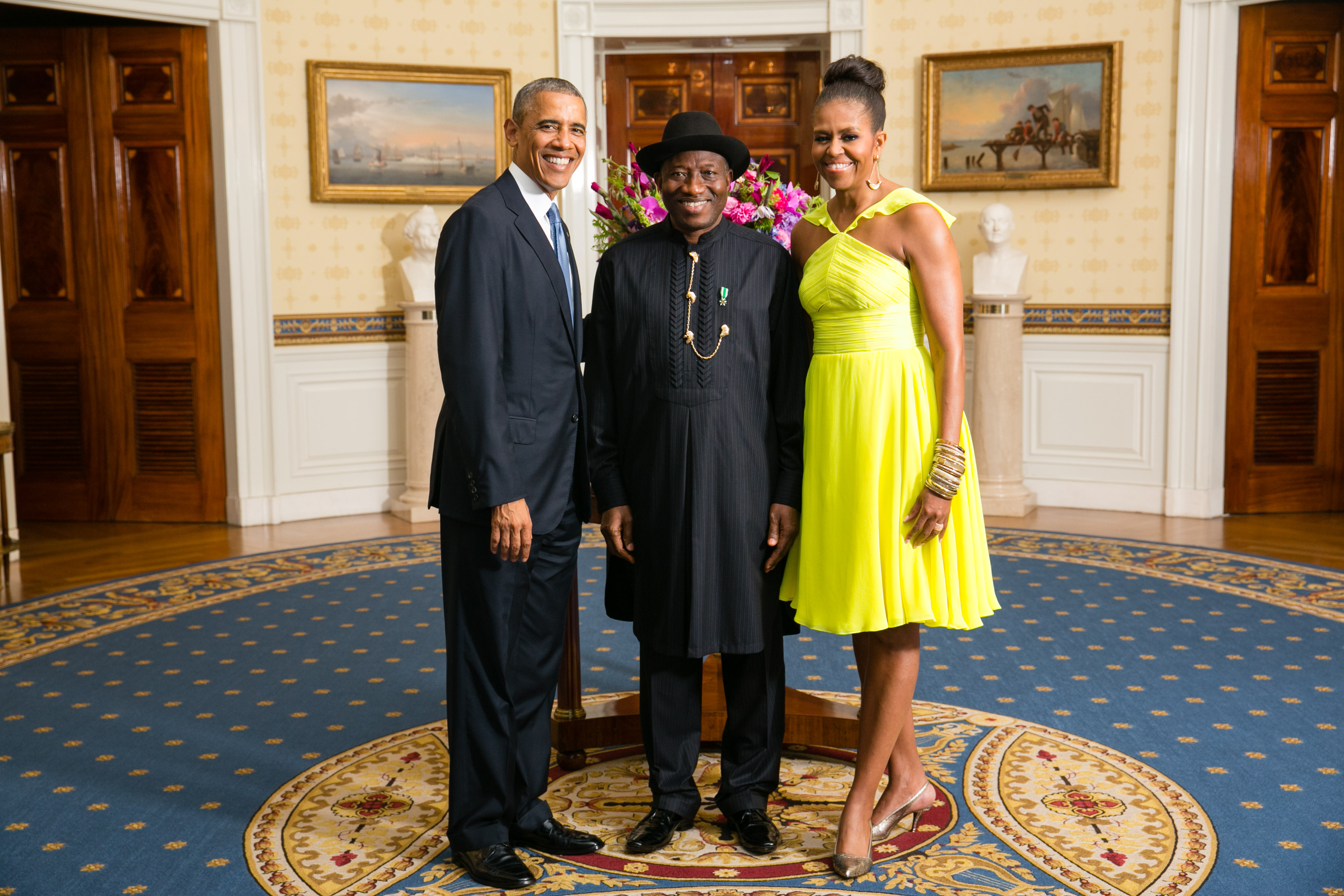
Jonathan with US President Barack Obama and First Lady Michelle Obama in 2014

During Jonathan's administration, Nigeria's foreign policy was reviewed to reflect a "citizen-focused" approach, designed to "accord this vision of defending the dignity of humanity the highest priority" and connect foreign policy to domestic policy, while placing a greater emphasis on economic diplomacy.

=== National issues ===
==== 2010 Nigerian lead poisoning incident ====
In January 2013, Jonathan reportedly promised $4 million to assist in cleaning up villages that have been affected by a lead poisoning incident. Over 400 children died and Human Rights Watch said that releasing the funds "could be lifesaving for countless children."

==== 2012 Occupy Nigeria protests ====
On 1 January 2012, the Jonathan administration announced the start of a controversial plan to end fuel subsidies. Following the Nigeria Labour Congress' warning that the country faces many strikes, the country unions followed up with strikes that were matched with civil protests from 9–13 January 2012. Protesters and groups called for Jonathan to resign over the removal of fuel subsidies. After five days of national protests and strikes, on 16 January, Jonathan announced that the pump price of petroleum would be 97 naira per litre compared to a post-subsidy level of 147 naira.

In 2012, upon the partial removal of petrol subsidies, the Jonathan administration instituted a subsidy re-investment programme designed to spend the money saved from partial petrol price deregulation on physical infrastructure such as roads, bridges, etc., across the country. The Subsidy Reinvestment and Empowerment Program (SURE-P) was also intended to improve maternal health and reduce maternal mortality. The government followed the advice of international experts who claimed the fuel subsidy (which cost $8 billion per year, or 25% of the annual government budget) was unsustainable. The Brookings Institution, a think tank, praised the government's move, arguing that the subsidy crowded out other development spending, such as education, and discouraged investment in the country's economic lifeblood: the oil sector. In his book My Transition Hours, Goodluck Jonathan stated that the subsidy was consuming too much of the nations revenues and that the public believed the sector was highly corrupt. He mentioned that the Minister of Finance Ngozi Okonjo-Iweala, briefed him on the corrupt practices uncovered by a technical committee she has assembled. Jonathan expressed alarm that billions of naira were being lost by the nation due to the subsidy regime.

Many prominent Nigerians spoke out against the removal of the subsidy. Former Petroleum Minister Professor Tam David-West expressed concern that the planned removal of the fuel subsidy will squeeze the economy, increase inflation, and hurt both businesses and the public. A former military Head of State who was also a former Minister for Petroleum & Natural Resources, General Muhammadu Buhari, urged Jonathan not to remove the fuel subsidy and to tackle corruption. Yakubu Gowon, another former military Head of State, warned the government that the country's infrastructure should be revived before fuel subsidy removal steps were taken. Former military president Gen. Ibrahim Babangida, joined millions of Nigerians protesting against the removal of the fuel subsidy by the Jonathan administration, saying that the action is ill-timed.

==== 2014 National Conference ====
In March 2014, President Jonathan inaugurated the 2014 National Conference. The conference was the first of its kind since the 2005 political reform conference, it had 492 delegates that debated on key socio-political national issues impeding national development.

==== 2014 Ebola outbreak ====
On 20 July 2014, Patrick Sawyer, a Liberian-American, flew from Monrovia to Murtala Muhammed International Airport in Lagos, with a stopover at Lomé, Togo. He was subsequently described as having appeared to be "terribly ill" when he left Monrovia. Sawyer became violently ill upon arriving at the airport and died five days later. In response, the Nigerian government observed all of Sawyer's contacts for signs of infection and increased surveillance at all entry points to the country.

On 6 August 2014, the Nigerian health minister told reporters: "Yesterday, the first known Nigerian to die of Ebola was recorded. This was one of the nurses that attended to the Liberian. The other five newly confirmed cases are being treated at an isolation ward." The doctor who treated Sawyer, Ameyo Adadevoh, subsequently also died of Ebola. On 22 September 2014, the Nigeria ministry of health announced: "As of today, there is no case of Ebola in Nigeria. All listed contacts who were under surveillance have been followed up for 21 days. "According to the WHO, 20 cases and 8 deaths had been confirmed, along with the imported case, who also died. Four of the dead were health care workers who had cared for Sawyer. In all, 529 contacts had been followed and of that date they had all completed a 21-day mandatory period of surveillance.

==== 2014 Same Sex Marriage Prohibition Act ====
In January 2014, Jonathan signed into law the Same Sex Marriage Prohibition Act after it was passed by the Senate and House of Representatives. The law prohibits gay relationships, membership and other involvement in gay societies and organisations and gay marriages. The bill came after international polls showed that 98% of Nigerians did not think homosexuality should be accepted by society, the highest percentage of any country surveyed. Penalties can be up to 14 years in prison for gay marriages and up to 10 years for other violations of the law. Within a short period, the federal police department compiled a list of 168 gay people who would subsequently be jailed. Within days 38 lesbian and gay people had been jailed, with arrests beginning during Christmas. The anti-LGBT bill stipulates that those who withhold the details of LGBT individuals face prison terms of up to five years. His decision and the law itself have been described as controversial, but according to a poll, 92% of Nigerians supported the ban.

=== Security issues ===
Jonathan's administration was heavily criticized for its failure to tackle insecurity. The first major challenge was the October 2010 Independence Day bombing. Okah told the court that President Jonathan and his aides organised the attacks in Abuja in a desperate political strategy to demonise political opponents, including former military head of state General Ibrahim Babangida, and to win popular sympathy ahead of the elections.

==== 2011 ====
On 29 May 2011, a few hours after Goodluck Jonathan was sworn in as president, several bombings purportedly by Boko Haram killed 15 and injured 55. On 16 June 2011, Boko Haram claimed to have conducted the Abuja police headquarters bombing, the first known suicide attack in Nigeria. Two months later the United Nations building in Abuja was bombed, signifying the first time that Boko Haram attacked an international organisation. In December 2011, it carried out attacks in Damaturu killing over a hundred people, subsequently clashing with security forces in December, resulting in at least 68 deaths. Two days later on Christmas Day, Boko Haram attacked several Christian churches with bomb blasts and shootings.

==== 2012 ====
According to Reuters, Shekau took control of the group after the death of Yusuf in 2009. Authorities had previously believed that Shekau died during the violence in 2009. By early 2012, the group was responsible for over 900 deaths. On 8 March 2012, a small Special Boat Service team and the Nigerian Army attempted to rescue two hostages, Chris McManus and Franco Lamolinara, being held in Nigeria by members of the Boko Haram terrorist organisation loyal to al-Qaeda. The two hostages were killed before or during the rescue attempt. All the hostage takers were reportedly killed.

==== 2013 ====
On 18 March, a bus station was bombed in Kano, with several casualties. In May 2013, Nigerian government forces launched an offensive in the Borno region in an attempt to dislodge Boko Haram fighters after a state of emergency was called on 14 May 2013. The state of emergency, applied to the states of Borno, Yobe, and Adamawa in northeastern Nigeria. The offensive had initial success, but the Boko Haram rebels were able to regain their strength. Although initially offering amnesty, by June 2013 he ordered a 20-year jail term for anyone found to be in support of Boko Haram. In July 2013, Boko Haram massacred 42 students in Yobe, bringing the school year to an early end in the state. On 5 August 2013, Boko Haram launched dual attacks on Bama and Malam Fatori, leaving 35 dead.

==== 2014 ====
On 16 January 2014, it was reported that Jonathan had sacked his military high command in response to their inability to end the Islamist-led insurgency in Northern Nigeria. On 14 April, over 200 schoolgirls in Chibok were kidnapped. A few weeks later in May, a terrorist offensive was launched against the military in Chibok. Many demonstrations called for the government to be more responsive; Jonathan asked that demonstrators focus on blaming Boko Haram itself for the abductions. Jonathan initially denied that there had been any abduction at all, but then later signaled his government would do a prisoner release in exchange for the kidnapped girls. Discussions then took place in Paris with foreign ministers from France, Britain, the United States and Israel, where he agreed no deals should be struck with terrorists. He then called off the exchange at the last minute on 24 May 2014. This reportedly enraged Boko Haram leaders.

In May 2014, two bombs exploded in Jos, resulting in the deaths of at least 118 people and the injury or over 56 others. During the June 2014 Northern Nigeria attacks, a plaza in the capital city was bombed and hundreds of villagers attacked in a two-day killing spree in Kaduna. In November, Boko Haram bombed the city of Kano, attempting to assassinate the Emir Muhammadu Sanusi II. Starting in late 2014, Boko Haram militants attacked several Nigerian towns in the North and captured them. This prompted the Nigerian government to launch an offensive, and with the help of Chad, Niger, and Cameroon, they have recaptured many areas that were formerly under the control of Boko Haram. In late 2014, Boko Haram seized control of Bama, according to the town's residents. In December 2014, it was reported that "people too elderly to flee Gwoza Local Government Area were being rounded up and taken to two schools where the militants opened fire on them." Over 50 elderly people in Bama were killed. A "gory" video was released of insurgents shooting over a hundred civilians in a school dormitory in the town of Bama.

==== 2015 ====
Between 3 and 7 January 2015, Boko Haram attacked the town of Baga and killed up to 2,000 people, perhaps the largest massacre by Boko Haram. On 10 January 2015, a bomb attack took place at the Monday Market in Maiduguri, killing 19 people. The city is considered to be at the heart of the Boko Haram insurgency. In the early hours of 25 January 2015, Boko Haram launched a major assault on the city. On 26 January 2015 CNN reported that the attack on Maiduguri by "hundreds of gunmen" had been repelled, but the nearby town of Monguno was captured by Boko Haram. The Nigerian Army claimed to have successfully repelled another attack on Maiduguri on 31 January 2015. Starting in late January 2015, a coalition of military forces from Nigeria, Chad, Cameroon, and Niger began a counter-insurgency campaign against Boko Haram. On 4 February 2015, the Chad Army killed over 200 Boko Haram militants. Soon afterwards, Boko Haram launched an attack on the Cameroonian town of Fotokol, killing 81 civilians, 13 Chadian soldiers and 6 Cameroonian soldiers.

On 17 February 2015 the Nigerian military retook Monguno in a coordinated air and ground assault. On 7 March 2015, Boko Haram's leader Abubakar Shekau pledged allegiance to the Islamic State of Iraq and the Levant (ISIL) via an audio message posted on the organisation's Twitter account. Nigerian army spokesperson Sami Usman Kukasheka said the pledge was a sign of weakness and that Shekau was like a "drowning man". That same day, five suicide bomb blasts left 54 dead and 143 wounded. On 12 March 2015, ISIL's spokesman Abu Mohammad al-Adnani released an audiotape in which he welcomed the pledge of allegiance, and described it as an expansion of the group's caliphate to West Africa. Following its declaration of loyalty to ISIL, Boko Haram was designated as the group's "West Africa Province" (Islamic State West Africa Province, or ISWAP) while Shekau was appointed as its first vali (governor). Furthermore, ISIL started to support Boko Haram, but also began to interfere in its internal matters. For example, ISIL's central leadership attempted to reduce Boko Haram's brutality toward civilians and internal critics, as Shekau's ideology was "too extreme even for the Islamic State".

On 24 March 2015, residents of Damasak, Nigeria said that Boko Haram had taken more than 400 women and children from the town as they fled from coalition forces. On 27 March 2015, the Nigerian army captured Gwoza, which was believed to be the location of Boko Haram headquarters. On election day, 28 March 2015, Boko Haram extremists killed 41 people, including a legislator, to discourage hundreds from voting. Niger Army soldiers during counter-insurgency operations against Boko Haram in March 2015. In March 2015, Boko Haram lost control of the Northern Nigerian towns of Bama and Gwoza (believed to be their headquarters) to the Nigerian Army. The Nigerian authorities said that they had taken back 11 of the 14 districts previously controlled by Boko Haram. In April 2016, four Boko Haram camps in the Sambisa Forest were overrun by the Nigerian military who freed nearly 300 females. Boko Haram forces were believed to have retreated to the Mandara Mountains, along the Cameroon–Nigeria border. On 16 March 2015, the Nigerian army said that it had recaptured Bama. On 27 March 2015, the day before the Nigerian presidential election, the Nigerian Army announced that it had recaptured the town of Gwoza from Boko Haram.

By April 2015, the Nigerian military was reported to have retaken most of the areas previously controlled by Boko Haram in Northeastern Nigeria, except for the Sambisa Forest. In May 2015, the Nigerian military announced that they had released about 700 women from camps in Sambisa Forest.

=== 2015 election ===
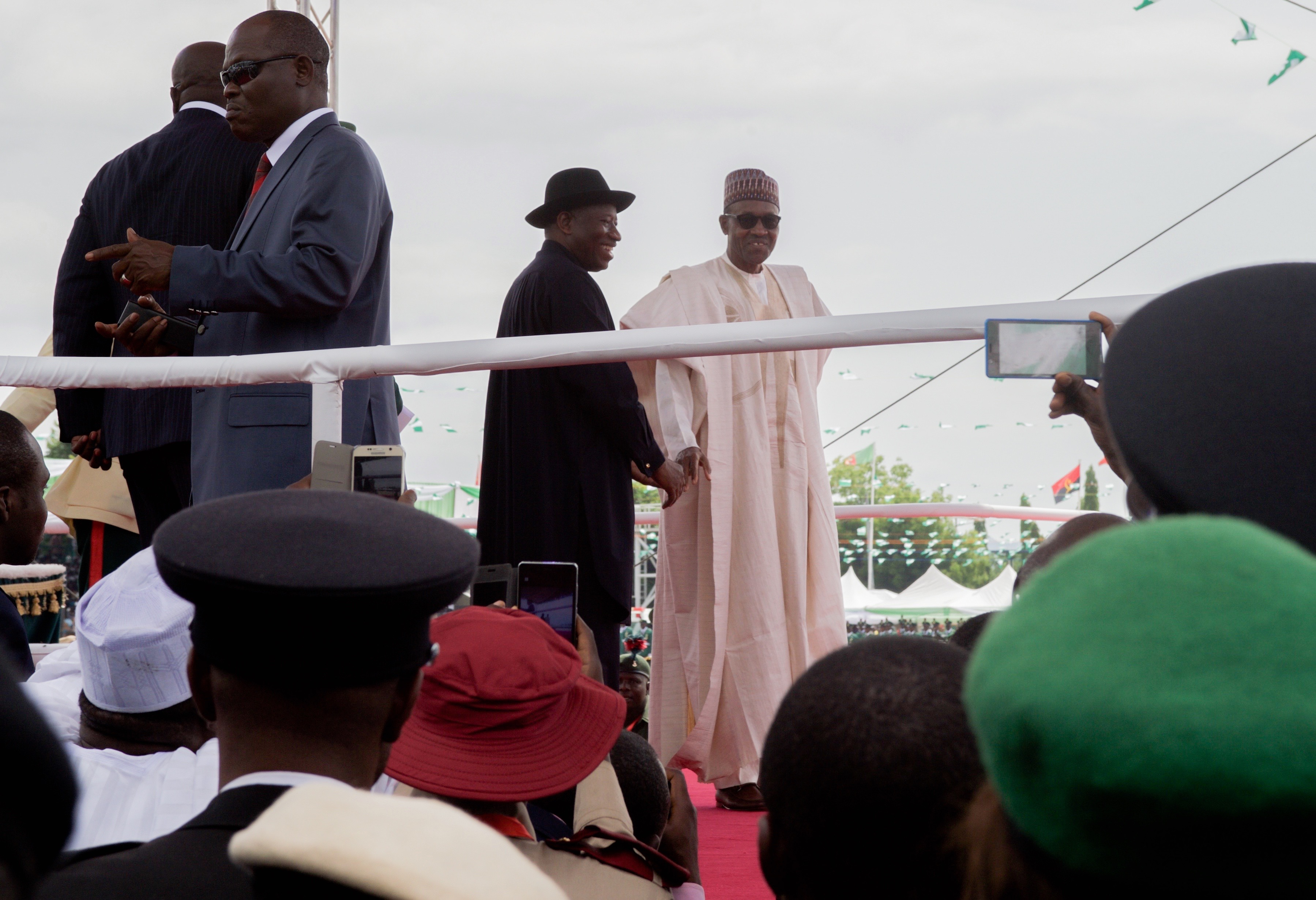
Outgoing President Jonathan in handshake with newly sworn in President Muhammadu Buhari at Eagle Square in Abuja, Nigeria, on 29 May 2015

Jonathan believed the APC's popularity was inflated, having made his view clear in an interview with The Cable, Nigeria's Independent Online Newspaper in 2015—just two days to the general elections. Jonathan said "I don't think Nigerians will make the mistake of voting for Buhari. Gen. Buhari, with due respect, is not the right option for Nigeria at this time. It is a gamble that is not worth taking. I may not be perfect as nobody is perfect. But I believe that come Saturday, the majority of Nigerian voters will choose me as the best candidate to lead the nation forward." On 31 March 2015, Jonathan conceded the election to challenger Muhammadu Buhari, who was sworn in to succeed him on 29 May 2015. Jonathan said in a statement he issued on 31 March 2015 that "Nobody's ambition is worth the blood of any Nigerian."

== Post-presidency (2015–present) ==
Since leaving office, Jonathan has continued to defend his administration. In 2019, he was appointed as the honorary special advisor to the Bayelsa Education Trust Fund board. In June 2019, Goodluck Jonathan was named chairperson of the newly inaugurated International Summit Council for Peace. In July 2020, Jonathan was appointed special envoy of the Economic Community of West African States (ECOWAS) to lead mediation talks during the 2020 Malian protests.

=== 2023 election ===
It was alleged that Jonathan had expressed interest to stand for the 2023 Nigerian presidential election under the All Progressives Congress (APC). To achieve this, the APC primary nomination form was picked up for him by an unknown political group. Nothing was later heard of it, as Jonathan never appeared for screening at the APC Secretariat. Former Lagos State governor, Bola Tinubu, emerged the APC candidate at a primary election conducted on 8 June 2022, defeating then-vice president Prof. Yemi Osinbajo and a host of other aspirants.

=== 2023 Zimbabwean general election ===
In 2023, Jonathan was appointed head of delegation for the African Union and COMESA in the 2023 Zimbabwean general election. On Friday, 25 August 2023, he addressed a press briefing giving Zimbabwe's electoral authority poor ratings. This was in harmony with similar findings by the SADC and SEAM delivered earlier in the same press briefing.

=== Chancellorship ===
Effective 27 April 2021, H.E. Dr. Goodluck Ebele Azikiwe Jonathan serves as the third Chancellor of Cavendish University Uganda. He succeeds H.E. Benjamin Mkapa, the former President of the United Republic of Tanzania and the second Chancellor, and H.E. Dr. Kenneth Kaunda, the former President of the Republic of Zambia and the first Chancellor.

== Personal life ==
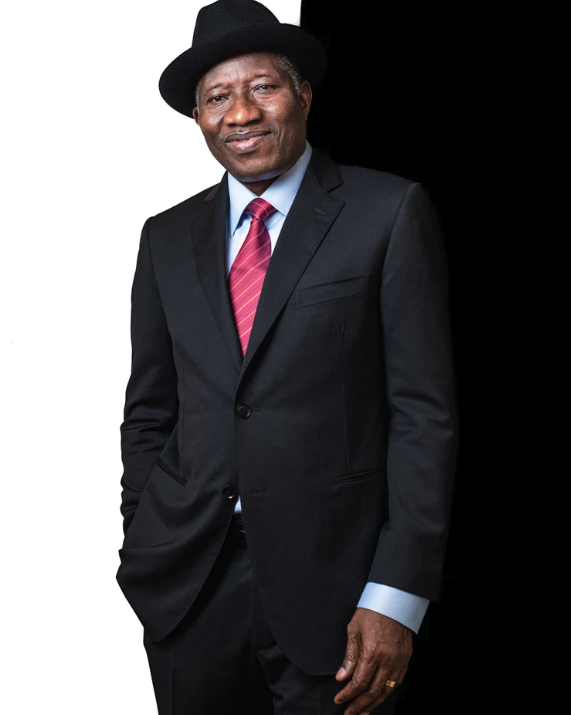
Goodluck Jonathan photographed at the UN General Assembly in New York 2016

=== Image ===
Jonathan is known for sporting his trademark fedora that is commonly worn by inhabitants of the Niger Delta.

=== Family ===
Jonathan is a polygamist; he and his senior wife, Patience Jonathan, have two children. He is also married to Ayima Lott-Jonathan.

=== Wealth ===
In 2007, Jonathan declared his assets worth a total of ₦295,304,420 (then equivalent to US$8,569,662).

== Honours ==
=== National honours ===
- Nigeria:
  - Grand Commander of the Order of the Federal Republic (GCFR)
  - Grand Commander of the Order of the Niger (GCON)

=== Foreign honours ===
- Namibia:
  - First Class of the Order of the Welwitschia (22 March 2014)

=== Other honours ===
- In 2013, Jonathan was awarded the chieftaincy title of the Se lolia I of Wakirike Bese. His wife, Patience Jonathan, also received a title of her own during the same ceremony.

== See also ==
- List of governors of Bayelsa State
- List of heads of state of Nigeria

Political offices
| Preceded by Diepreye Alamieyeseigha | Governor of Bayelsa State; 2005–2007 | Succeeded by Timipre Sylva |
| Preceded by Atiku Abubakar | Vice President of Nigeria; 2007–2010 | Succeeded by Namadi Sambo |
| Preceded by Umaru Yar'Adua | President of Nigeria; 2010–2015 | Succeeded by Muhammadu Buhari |
Diplomatic posts
| Preceded by Umaru Yar'Adua | Chairperson of the Economic Community of West African States; 2010–12 | Succeeded by Alassane Ouattara |
Party political offices
| Preceded by Umaru Yar'Adua | People's Democratic Party nominee for President of Nigeria; 2011, 2015 | Succeeded by Atiku Abubakar |
