= 2015 Baga massacre =

Terrorist attacks in Nigeria by Boko Haram

- Part of the Boko Haram insurgency
- Location of Baga in Nigeria
- Location: 13°7′7.7″N 13°51′23.7″E; Baga, Borno State, Nigeria
- Date: 3–7 January 2015
- Target: Local residents, Nigerian Army base in town
- Attack type: Mass killing, spree killing, petrol bombing, others
- Deaths: 150–2,000+
- Perpetrator: Boko Haram

The 2015 Baga massacre was a series of mass killings carried out by the Boko Haram group in the north-eastern Nigerian town of Baga and its environs, in the state of Borno, between 3 January and 7 January 2015.

The attack began on 3 January when Boko Haram overran a military base that was the headquarters of the Multinational Joint Task Force containing troops from Chad, Niger, and Nigeria. The militants then forced thousands of locals from the region and committed mass killings that culminated on the 7th.

Fatalities have been reported to be "heavy" but their extent is unclear. Western media outlets reported that "over 2,000" people are thought to have been killed or "unaccounted for", but local media reported "at least a hundred" fatalities, while the Nigerian Ministry of Defence said that no more than 150 people in total had been killed, including militants. Several government officials denied that the fatalities were as extensive as reported, with some even claiming that the massacre had never taken place or that the Nigerian military had repelled the militants from the region, a claim that was refuted by local officials, survivors, and the international media.

Baga and at least 16 other towns are thought to have been destroyed as over 35,000 people are reported to have been displaced, with many feared to have drowned while trying to cross Lake Chad and others trapped on islands in the lake. The attacks are said to have resulted in Boko Haram extending its control to over 70% of Borno State, while its leader, Abubakar Shekau, claimed responsibility for the massacre in a video statement, saying that they "were not much" and that the group's insurgency "would not stop".

== Background ==
Baga, in Borno State, was the location of a Nigerian Army base that was the headquarters of the Multinational Joint Task Force (MNJTF), an international force of soldiers from Nigeria, Niger and Chad that was formed in 1994 to deal with cross-border security issues and, more recently, combating the Boko Haram insurgency. For that reason, the town is believed to have been of strategic importance to Boko Haram, as the last major town in Northern Borno State under the control of the Nigerian government and a key military base for government and international forces.

== Massacre and attacks ==
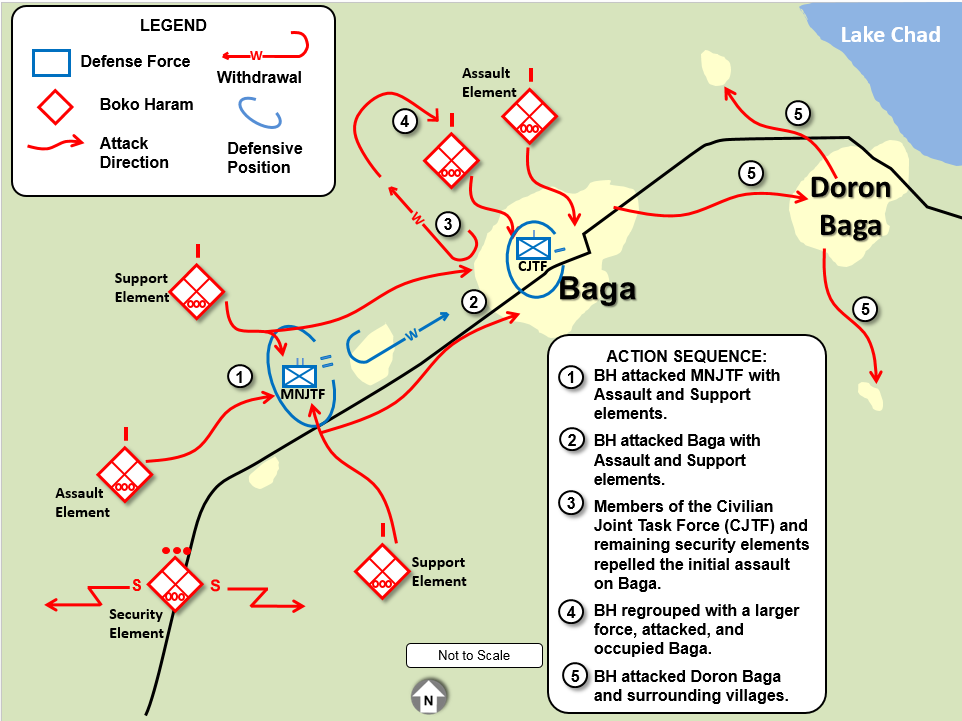
Map of the attack on the MNJTF camp and Baga town.

The attacks began on 3 January, when a large number of Boko Haram militants captured the town of Baga and overran the MNJTF headquarters and army base in town.

=== Attack on MNJTF headquarters ===
According to Senator Ahmed Zanna, who represents the district of Borno Central, government forces—despite being the joint headquarters, only Nigerian Army forces were stationed there at the time—resisted the militants, who "attacked from all sides", for several hours, but eventually "joined civilians fleeing into the bush". They reportedly seized a large number of weapons and vehicles, according to Zanna.

In the days following the assault, the militants forced Baga's residents into the surrounding area villages. On the evening of Tuesday, 6 January, two local residents reported that the militants began to burn local buildings using petrol bombs and explosives, and according to survivors proceeded to kill those left. On 9 January, a resident described the extent of the damage by reporting, "There is not any single house that is standing there." According to Musa Bukar, head of the Kukawa local government area, all 16 villages in the LGA were razed as well, and their residents either killed or forced to flee.

=== Extent of fatalities ===
The extent of the killings is as of yet unknown, and reports vary widely.

According to Human Rights Watch:

The exact death toll in Baga and 16 surrounding villages is unknown, with estimates ranging from "dozens" to 2000 or more. "No one stayed back to count bodies", one local resident told Human Rights Watch. "We were all running to get out of town ahead of Boko Haram fighters who have since taken over the area".

Bukar stated that over two thousand people are thought to have been killed. Zanna said that two thousand were "unaccounted for"; other sources said that "dozens" or "over a hundred" had been killed. At least 100 were killed in the initial attack on 3 January, according to Baba Abba Hassan, the district head, later adding that "hundreds of corpses still lay on the streets" of the town and that many women and children were among the victims, having been pursued into the bush by the militants. According to Human Rights Watch, another survivor claimed that the deceased at the waterside were so numerous they were "uncountable".

Hassan, however, denied that the attack on 7 January had ever occurred and that the figure of 2,000 deaths was "outrageous". Several government sources allegedly rejected claims of such a high number of fatalities, suggesting that it was considerably lower. However, the Nigerian government has downplayed the extent of, and frequently outright denied the existence of, Boko Haram attacks several times in the past, including a prior massacre in Baga in 2013 where both Boko Haram and the Nigerian military were implicated in the death of over 200 citizens.

== Aftermath and refugee crisis ==
Satellite imagery taken on 2 and 7 January was released by Amnesty International showing that in Baga, which is "less than two square kilometres in size, approximately 620 structures were damaged or completely destroyed by fire." In Doron Baga, located about 2.5 km away, fishing boats present on the 2nd were no longer visible, and "more than 3,100 structures were damaged or destroyed by fire affecting most of the 4 square kilometre town."

Daniel Eyre, Nigeria researcher for Amnesty International stated: "The attack on Baga and surrounding towns, looks as if it could be Boko Haram's deadliest act in a catalog of increasingly heinous attacks carried out by the group. If reports that the town was largely razed to the ground and that hundreds or even as many as two thousand civilians were killed are true, this marks a disturbing and bloody escalation of Boko Haram's ongoing onslaught against the civilian population."

Maina Maaji Lawan, a former governor of Borno state and the current Senator representing the district of Borno North, questioned why the soldiers had reportedly fled the base, saying: "[t]here is definitely something wrong that makes our military abandon their posts each time there is an attack from Boko Haram." This followed a spate of Nigerian troops, numbering in the hundreds, fleeing Boko Haram in battle. According to Lawan, the attack meant that 70% of Borno State would now be under the control of Boko Haram.

=== Refugee crisis ===
On 7 January, a government spokesperson stated that 1,636 IDPs had been registered following the attack. According to independent reports and local officials, however, least 35,000 people are thought to have fled the region. "Bodies lay strewn on the streets", according to survivors, as the entire population of Baga is thought to have fled, some into Cameroon and Chad. Approximately 20,000 sought shelter at camp near Maiduguri, the state capital, and another 10,000 in Monguno were waiting to be transported. Bukar said that the town was now "virtually non-existent". Local human rights activists said that they had been told by women who had escaped the town that their daughters, some as young as 10, had been kidnapped.

Chadian Prime Minister Kalzeubet Pahimi Deubet said that at least 2,500 Nigerians and 500 Chadians had sought refuge in the neighbouring country following the attacks, some of whom were trying to cross Lake Chad in flimsy and overloaded canoes. Many of those trying to cross the lake were feared to have drowned, while hundreds of others, over five hundred by one account, were trapped on islands in the lake. According to local officials who had communicated with the refugees via telephone, refugees were "dying from lack of food, cold and malaria" on one "mosquito-infested island."

== Response and criticism ==
A large number of commentators criticised what they saw as insufficient coverage of the massacre in the international newsmedia, suggesting it was indicative of an ingrained bias towards African affairs. Others condemned the degree to which the government of Nigeria and local media was downplaying or even ignoring the attacks, adding that local apathy was ultimately responsible for the amount of attention which foreign media chose to place on the massacre. The responses of government officials were considered to be closely related to the highly contested presidential election taking place that year.

Government security officials initially stated that "base troops had held their positions" and quickly denied that any attack had taken place in Baga. One pro-government newspaper, citing a local fisherman, went as far to claim that Boko Haram had instead been dealt a "heavy defeat" by the Nigerian military in Baga and that the town was firmly under government control. Air Chief Marshal Alex Badeh, the Chief of the Defence Staff, initially denied that the MNJTF headquarters had been captured but later admitted that it had.

The location of the attack in remote northeastern Borno State, much of which is occupied by Boko Haram, as well as "the routine nature of Nigeria's violence may have diminished" perceptions of the massacre's newsworthiness. Experts have noted that media has been suppressed in Borno State, where witnesses with information frequently lack contacts with the media, and statements by the military are unreliable. The Nigerian press was also seen as not adequately covering the attacks in Baga. One expert stated: "Local media caught on to the story only after the BBC's coverage. This is because there's been ongoing violence in the past year and people are increasingly desensitised."

Many newspapers did not initially report on the massacre at all, and those that did, in many cases, either referred to the prior first attack on 3 January and gave figures far more limited than those circulating elsewhere, or gave outright denials of one sort or another. One newspaper's headline stated that the "BBC lied" in reporting that the second attack of 7 January had taken place.

=== Goodluck Jonathan ===
Many commentators criticised the international media for a perceived lack of coverage of the massacre, especially in comparison with that received by the Charlie Hebdo attack in Paris, which had occurred just days before. However, President Goodluck Jonathan, while campaigning in Enugu for re-election and his People's Democratic Party on 8 January, himself condemned the events in Paris as a "dastardly terrorist attack", while refraining from making any comment on the massacre in Baga. Jonathan's failure to remark on the attacks earned him widespread and international criticism; Julius Malema, leader of the left-wing Economic Freedom Fighters party in South Africa and former head of the Youth League of the ruling African National Congress, disparaged Jonathan, saying:

Goodlook, or Goodluck or whatever his name is or badluck I don’t know ... He is quick to release statement about the killing in Paris; but don’t (sic) say anything about the killings in his own country. That’s an irresponsible leadership.

On 14 January, Goodluck, along with Chief of the Defence Staff Badeh, National Security Advisor Sambo Dasuki, and several other senior military commanders, made an unscheduled visit to Maiduguri, meeting with Borno's governor, Kashim Shettima, at the city's airport under heavy guard. The visit was "shrouded in secrecy" and Jonathan made no public comment about his visit or the attacks while there. On 16 January, members of the Young Global Leaders of the World Economic Forum, including Hafsat Abiola-Costello, daughter of the late imprisoned President-elect M.K.O. Abiola, published an open letter in The Guardian to Jonathan urging him to end his silence on the attacks, saying that he had "met calamity with insouciance", drawing parallels with his belated response to the Chibok schoolgirls kidnapping.

=== Political consequences ===
The issue of the Boko Haram insurgency and the inability of the government to fight the group were closely tied with the country's upcoming presidential elections. According to Manji Cheto, vice-president of a corporate advisory firm, Goodluck "by acknowledging the scale of the violence, [would be] acknowledging a certain degree of his failure as a president, so he’s not going to talk about security with less than six weeks to go before the election." Many analysts and observers expressed similar views, that the downplaying of the attacks by Goodluck, the government, and media outlets supportive of the PDP was intended to reduce the political costs of domestic instability in the election.

In contrast, the opposition All Progressives Congress and its candidate, former military ruler Muhammadu Buhari, were quick to condemn the attacks and the government's response. Buhari, on 10 January, said that the massacre was further proof to the claim that "Nigeria has become a place where people no longer feel safe, where the armed forces have neither the weapons nor the government support required to do an effective job of protecting Nigerian citizens and their property." Buhari, a Muslim from northern Nigeria, seized power in a 1983 coup d'état before being ousted himself in a coup d'état in 1985 on the grounds that his style of rule was excessively repressive. According to analysts, however, to many Nigerians in 2015, Buhari's "reputation for strong leadership and intolerance of corruption" as leader, and his campaigning on such, appealed to an "intense public yearning for an end to Boko Haram’s nihilism and to instability caused by rising communal, criminal and political violence". The search for security could "override traditional voting patterns based on religious and ethnic affiliations", but the International Crisis Group in a reported warned that the tightening race instead "suggests the country is heading toward a very volatile and vicious electoral contest." Although the elections were postponed, the ongoing violence and insurgency of Boko Haram is regarded as having played a major factor in Buhari's ultimate defeat of Jonathan.

== See also ==
- 2013 Baga massacre
- List of massacres in Nigeria
- List of terrorist incidents, 2015
