= Lennart Risberg =

Swedish boxer (1935–2013)

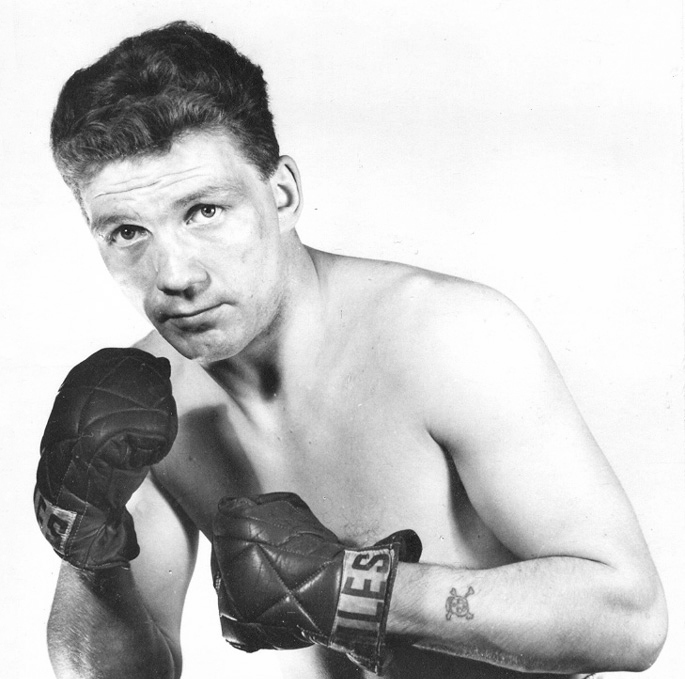
- Lennart Risberg in the mid 1920's

Personal information
- Nationality: Swedish
- Born: 16 April 1935 Stockholm, Sweden
- Died: 4 September 2013 (aged 78) Eskilstuna, Sweden
- Weight: Lightweight

Boxing career

Lennart Kurt Risberg (16 April 1935 – 4 September 2013) was a Swedish boxer. He competed in the lightweight event at the 1956 Summer Olympics, but was eliminated in the first round.
