= 2013 Baga massacre =

Part of Islamist insurgency in Nigeria

- Part of the Boko Haram insurgency
- Location of Baga in Nigeria
- Location: 12.0900°N 13.8225°E; Baga, Borno State, Nigeria
- Date: 16–17 April 2013
- Attack type: Mass killing, spree killing, petrol bombing, others
- Deaths: 37-228+
- Perpetrator: Nigerian Army or Boko Haram (disputed)

The Baga massacre began on 16 April 2013 in the village of Baga, Nigeria, in Borno State, when as many as 200 civilians were killed, hundreds wounded, and over 2,000 houses and businesses worth millions of Naira were destroyed. Refugees, civilians officials, and human rights organizations accused the Nigerian Military of carrying out the massacre; some military officials blamed the insurgent group Boko Haram.

== Background ==
Thousands of people have died in fighting in Nigeria since the beginning of 2009 Boko Haram uprising, which began in northern Nigeria. The leader of the uprising, Mohammed Yusuf, was killed in Maiduguri of Borno State in 2009.

According to The New York Times, the Nigerian military has employed "scorched-earth standards" in their fight against Boko Haram, with civilians routinely killed during operations in poor neighborhoods. Massacres prior to the Baga massacre were commonly employed as punitive measures against the civilian population, without legal consequences in Nigeria.

The commander of the Multinational Joint Task Force Brigadier General Austin Edokpaye accused residents of Baga of shielding Boko Haram members prior to the attack.

Baga is a small fishing village on the banks of lake Chad, near the borders of Chad and Niger.

== Events ==
On the evening of 16 April, members of Boko Haram engaged government soldiers at a military post outside Baga, killing one of them. According to residents, soldiers returned with reinforcements supported by armored vehicles. Soldiers then allegedly doused homes in Baga with gasoline and set fire to the village, shooting villagers who attempted to flee. Some attempting to escape into Lake Chad drowned there, while others were able to escape into the surrounding bush. According to residents, the soldiers continued burning homes in Baga on 17 April.

Brigadier General Austin Edokpaye stated that only six civilians and one soldier were killed, while the army killed 30 "Boko Haram terrorists." He further stated that only 30 "thatched houses" were burned and that the fires were started by Boko Haram's weapons. Residents and civilian officials alleged that as many as 200 people were killed and more than 2,000 homes were burned. Casualties were reported to be especially high among children and the elderly. By 17 April 193 wounded victims had been admitted to a local health clinic. Satellite images analyzed by Human Rights Watch indicate that at least 2,275 buildings were destroyed and another 125 buildings were severely damaged.

== Reactions ==
Following the massacre, the Nigerian government came under intense pressure from international governments and media, leading the Nigerian national assembly to call for an investigation. Journalists attempting to independently access the village were blocked by the Nigerian military.

=== Nigerian army denial ===
Brigadier General Chris Olukolade stated that anyone blaming Nigerian soldiers sympathized with Boko Haram, which he said was responsible for the massacre and had shot at government soldiers from the village.

=== U.S. Government condemnation ===
The United States's acting deputy State Department spokesman Patrick Ventrell, on 22 April 2013, condemned the clash between the Nigerian security forces and Boko Haram militants in Baga, urging authorities to respect human rights.

=== Nigeria orders probe ===
Nigeria's President Goodluck Jonathan through his special adviser on media and publicity, Reuben Abati, ordered a full-scale investigation into the civilian casualties in the war between Boko Haram and Nigeria's soldiers at the weekend.

=== National Human Rights Commission investigation ===
Nigeria's National Human Rights Commission announced on 29 April 2013 that it would conduct an investigation into the incident. In June 2013, the commission released an interim report. The report noted that the commission had been unable to visit Baga because of the inability of the security forces to guarantee the safety of commission personnel. The report, however, cited a police incident report that found that soldiers in Baga "started shooting indiscriminately at anybody in sight" and that five wards in Baga were "completely razed down by the soldiers".

== See also ==
- 2015 Baga massacre
- List of massacres in Nigeria
- List of terrorist incidents, January–June 2013
