= Diepreye Alamieyeseigha =

Nigerian politician (1952–2015)

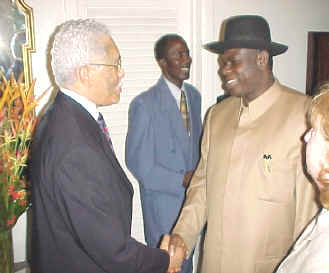
- Diepreye Alamieyeseigha (right) with U.S. Ambassador to Nigeria Howard F. Jeter (left), 6 July 2001

5th Governor of Bayelsa
- In office 29 May 1999 – 9 December 2005
- Preceded by: Paul Obi
- Succeeded by: Goodluck Jonathan

Personal details
- Born: 16 November 1952 Amassoma, Southern Region, British Nigeria (now Bayelsa State, Nigeria)
- Died: 10 October 2015 (aged 62) Port Harcourt, Rivers State, Nigeria

Diepreye Solomon Peter "D.S.P." Alamieyeseigha (16 November 1952 – 10 October 2015) was a Nigerian politician who was the first civilian Governor of Bayelsa State in Nigeria from 29 May 1999 to 9 December 2005.

== Background ==
Diepreye Alamieyeseigha was born on 16 November 1952 in Amassoma, Bayelsa State. He attended the Bishop Dimeari Grammar School, Yenagoa. He joined the Nigerian Defence Academy as a Cadet Officer in 1974, then joined the Nigerian Air Force, where he served in the department of Logistics and Supply. He held various air force positions in Enugu, Makurdi, Kaduna and Ikeja. Alamieyeseigha retired from the air force in 1992 as a Squadron Leader.

After leaving the air force, he became the Sole Administrator of Pabod Supplies Port Harcourt. Later he became Head of Budget, Planning, Research and Development of the National Fertiliser Company (NAFCON).

== Governor of Bayelsa State ==
Diepreye Alamieyeseigha was elected as Governor of Bayelsa State in May 1999 as a member of the ruling People's Democratic Party (PDP). He was re-elected in 2003. Vice President Atiku Abubakar attended the March 2003 event that kicked of his campaign for reelection.

== Corruption charges ==
=== United Kingdom ===
Diepreye Alamieyeseigha was detained in London on charges of money laundering in September 2005. At the time of his arrest, Metropolitan police found about £1m in cash in his London home. Later they found a total of £1.8m ($3.2m) in cash and bank accounts. He was found to own four homes in London worth an alleged £10 million. His state's monthly federal allocation for the last six years has been in the order of £32 million. He jumped bail in December 2005 from the United Kingdom by allegedly disguising himself as a woman, though Alamieyeseigha denies this claim. Alamieyeseigha was impeached on allegations of corruption on 9 December 2005.

=== Nigeria ===
On 26 July 2007, Alamieyeseigha pleaded guilty before a Nigerian court to six charges and was sentenced to two years in prison on each charge; however, because the sentences were set to run concurrently and the time was counted from the point of his arrest nearly two years before the sentences, his actual sentence was relatively short. Many of his assets were ordered to be forfeited to the Bayelsa state government. According to Alamieyeseigha, he only pleaded guilty due to his age and would have fought the charges had he been younger. On 27 July, just hours after being taken to prison, he was released due to time already served.

In April 2009, Alamieyeseigha pledged a donation of 3,000,000 naira to the Akassa Development Foundation.

In December 2009, the federal government hired a British law firm to help dispose of four expensive properties acquired by Alamieyeseigha in London. He had bought one of these properties for £1,750,000.00 in July 2003, paying in cash. D.S.P. Alamieyeseigha used it as his London residence, and as the registered office of Solomon and Peters Inc.

=== United States ===
On 28 June 2012, the United States Department of Justice (DOJ) announced it had executed an asset forfeiture order on $401,931 in a Massachusetts brokerage fund, traceable to Alamieyeseigha. US prosecutors filed court papers in April 2011 targeting the Massachusetts brokerage fund and a $600,000 home in Rockville, Maryland, which they alleged were the proceeds of corruption. A motion for default judgement and civil forfeiture was granted by a Massachusetts federal district judge in early June 2012.

In February 2023, the United States signed an agreement with Nigeria for the restitution of approximately one million dollars embezzled by Deprieye Alamieyeseigha.

=== Pardon ===
On 12 March 2013, Alamieyeseigha was pardoned by President Goodluck Jonathan; the pardon was criticised by many.

== Death ==
Alamieyeseigha was reported to have died of cardiac arrest at the University of Port Harcourt Teaching Hospital on 10 October 2015. However, in a later interview, Bayelsa State Information Commissioner, Esueme Kikile revealed that the former Governor "died of complications arising from high blood pressure and diabetes which affected his kidney."

== See also ==
- James Ibori
