= Baga, Borno State =

Baga

- Location in Nigeria
- Coordinates: 13°7′7.7″N 13°51′23.7″E
- Country: Nigeria
- State: Borno
- LGA: Kukawa

Baga is a town in the northeastern Nigerian state of Borno, close to Lake Chad, and lying northeast of the town of Kukawa. It is located within the Kukawa Local Government Area.

The town is approximately 196 km from Maiduguri, the capital of Borno State. The "Doron Baga" fish market, as of 2000, was located about six kilometres from the town. Baga used to lie on the border of Lake Chad and was a fishing center itself in the 1960s and 1970s, but the diminishing size of the lake has caused fishermen to move, and others have turned to subsistence farming.

The town and the nearby naval base have been under the control by the Islamic State's West Africa Province since December 2018.

== Baga massacres ==
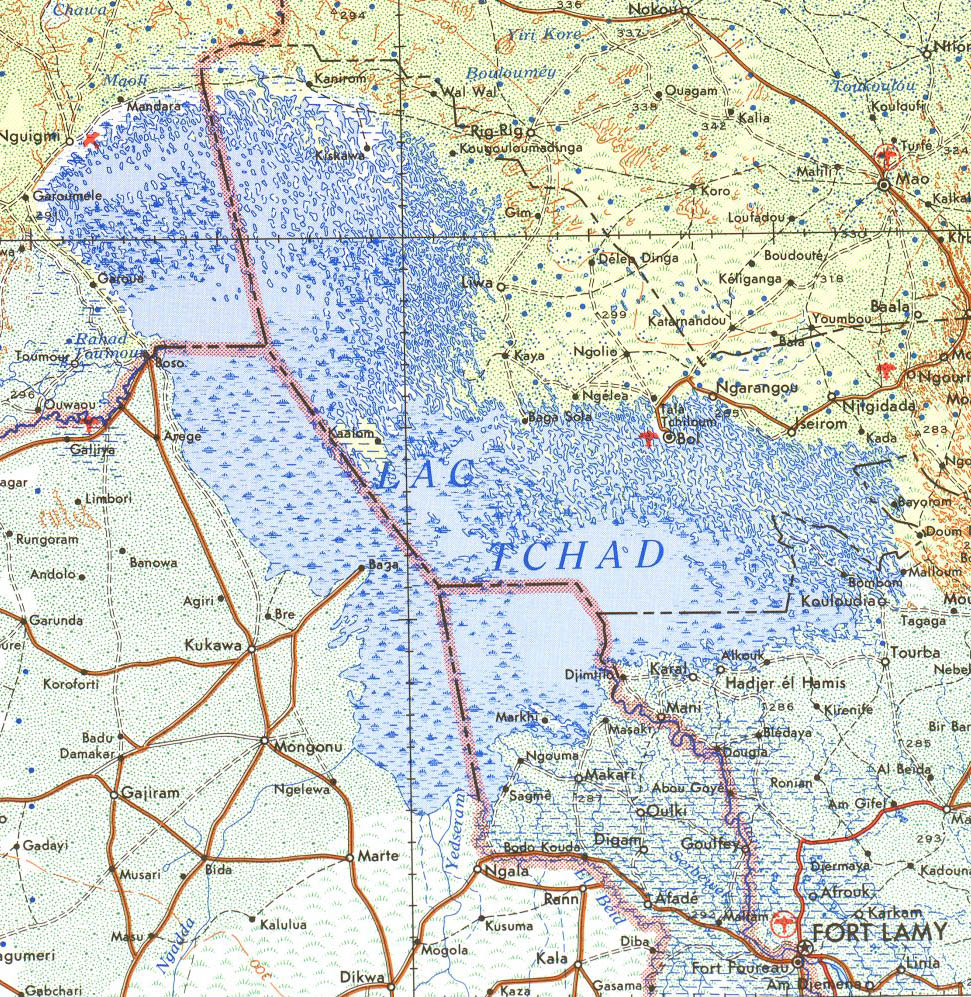
Baga appears on a peninsula jutting into Lake Chad on this 1973 map.

=== 2013 Baga massacre ===
In April 2013, over 185 people were killed and over 2000 homes in Baga were destroyed as a result of fighting between the Nigerian military and the Boko Haram militant group; it is debatable which group was actually responsible.

=== 2015 Baga massacre ===
In January 2015, Boko Haram attacked the town, seizing it and the military base used by a multinational force set up to fight them. The town was burned and the people massacred — with some estimates claiming up to 2000 deaths — the largest such massacre in Boko Haram's history. Some residents escaped to nearby Chad by swimming across Lake Chad, though some died in the attempt.

According to the Nigerian Ministry of Defence, no more than 150 people in total had been killed, including militants. Several government officials denied that the fatalities were as extensive as reported, with some even claiming that the massacre had never taken place or that the Nigerian military had repelled the militants from the region, a claim that was refuted by local officials, survivors, and the international media.

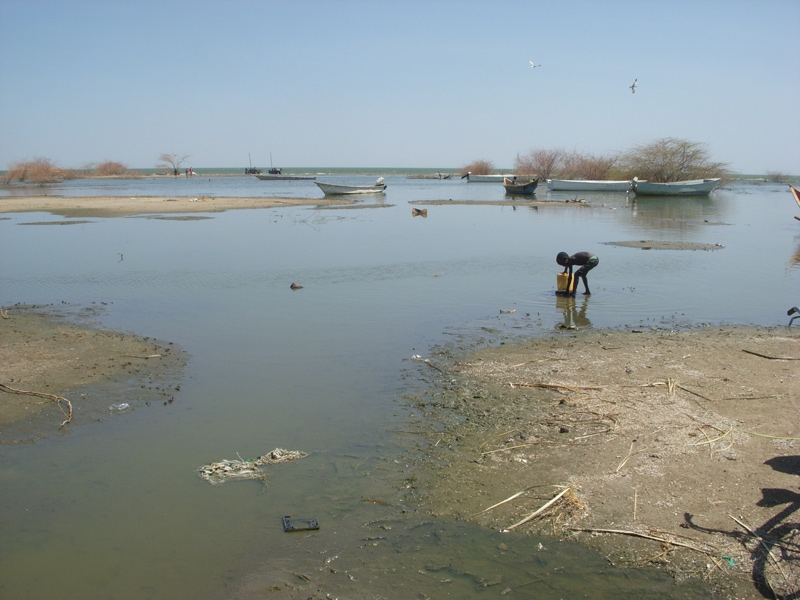
Lake Chad as viewed from Baga

Satellite imagery taken on 2 and 7 January was released by Amnesty International showing that in Baga, which is "less than two square kilometres in size, approximately 620 structures were damaged or completely destroyed by fire." In Doron Baga (or Doro Gowon), located about 2.5 km away, fishing boats present on the 2nd were no longer visible, and "more than 3,100 structures were damaged or destroyed by fire affecting most of the 4 square kilometre town."

=== 2018 ===
On 27 December, Boko Haram attacked a military base in the town of Baga, killing 10 people. Most reports agree that the town is now under the control of the terrorist organisation.
