= Ondo State Ministry of Agriculture and Natural Resources =

Ondo state ministry

Ondo State Ministry of Agriculture and Natural Resources is a Nigerian regional state ministry functioning on the development and Implementation of policies and programs designed towards the sustainability of agriculture, food security, rural development and conservation of natural resources.

== Departments ==
There are various departments in the ministry of Agriculture and Mineral Resources, including:

- Finance and Administration
- Agricultural Services
- Veterinary
- Fisheries
- Planning, Research and Statistics
- Livestock
