= Agricultural sustainability in northern Nigeria =

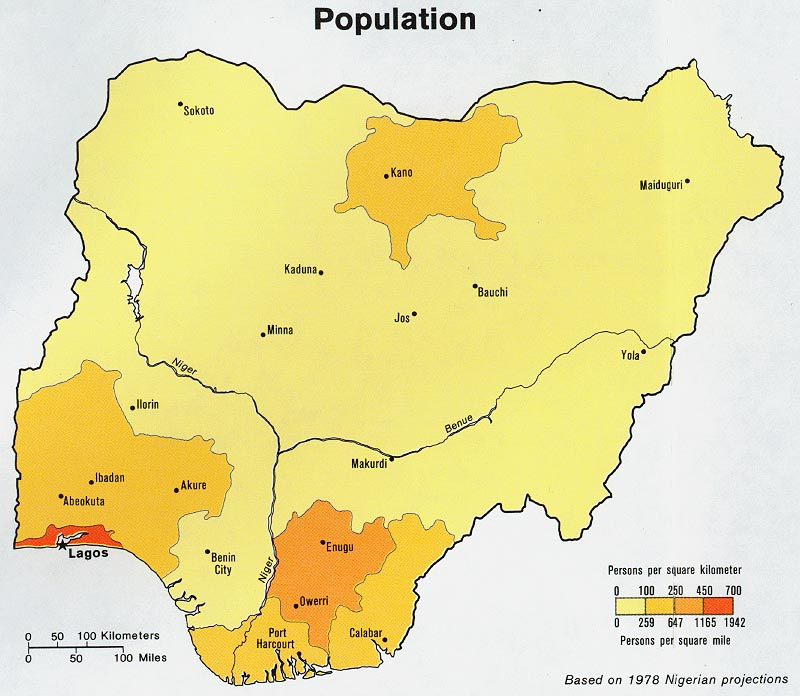
Population density of Nigeria per square kilometer

Agricultural sustainability in northern Nigeria requires flexibility in both ecological management as well as economic activity. The population densities of the rural area in this region climbed from 243 to 348 people per square kilometer between 1962 and 1991, but the land area under permanent cultivation remained approximately the same. Increasing population results in high food demand among urban and rural dwellers, areas of cultivation, and reduced soil fertility. However, there are instances where frequent agricultural practices is not associated with degradation such as in Kano and neighboring region. Even though poverty and insufficient food exists in the region, it does not affect crop yield owing to sustained efforts to produce food in response to its high demand.

Rainfall occurs seasonally – and there is a pronounced dry season – but is often intensive when it does come, making it necessary for farmers to employ soil moisture conservation techniques. The bulk crops are grown during the rainy season which begins in June or July, when the temperature is warm. The soils in the region are reddish brown or brown soils of the pH range of 6.0–7.0. The main crops grown in the region are millet, sorghum, and cowpea, while groundnut and sesame are significant minor crops. Wild foods also serve as an important supplement to the diet, especially during times of food shortage. The bulk crops are grown during the rainy season which begins in June or July, when the temperature is warm. In this region, there are sedentary Farmers made up of the Manga and Hausa people, and the nomadic pastoralists known as Fulani.

In northern Nigeria, research surrounding intensive agricultural practices has been taking place for a number of decades, especially in the Kano Close-Settled Zone. Development plans for this region have focused on the use of imported technology and irrigation schemes, while neglecting traditional farming practices of the region. These traditional practices generally focus on the close integration between the raising of livestock and farming and it is being studied in detail in the Kano Close-Settled Zone of northern Nigeria. In the nineteenth century, the intensive agriculture carried out in this area of dense population surrounding Kano city was noted by western visitors like Henry Barth.

== Introduction ==
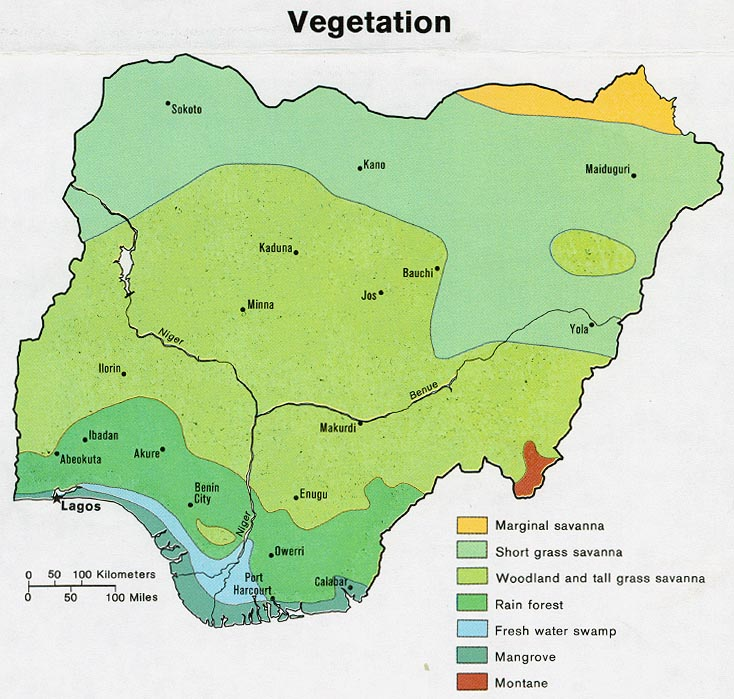
Topographic map of Nigeria

Due to the social and environmental conditions in northern Nigeria, the flexibility of both ecological management and economic activity are vital components of any strategy for agricultural and rural livelihood in the region. It is often contended that African farmers are unsuccessful at intensifying agriculture through the use of a method that is environmentally sustainable as well as economically productive. The vegetation of northern Nigeria is predominantly marginal or short grass savannah, and this region is characterized by a relatively hot climate with seasonal rainfall and a marked dry season. The pressures of an increasing population are understood to cause increasing food demands by urban consumers and rural farmers, the expansion of areas of cultivation, reduced uncultivated land intervals with a lack of inputs necessary to compensate and as a result reduced soil fertility. This means that per capita and per hectare yields will decline and food will become scarce, especially for those in rural areas. However, an increase in Population density may have a positive impact rather than negative consequences for the economy as well as the environment. Studies carried out in the Kano Close-Settled Zone and the surrounding region indicated that in particular places, at certain times, the intensification of agricultural practices can take place without the typical associated degradation. While there exist poverty in the region, as well as people who are without sufficient food, it does not appear to be a decline in crop yields. Instead, evidence suggests there has been a sustained effort to increase the production of food in an attempt to keep up with the increasing need.

== Soils of the region ==
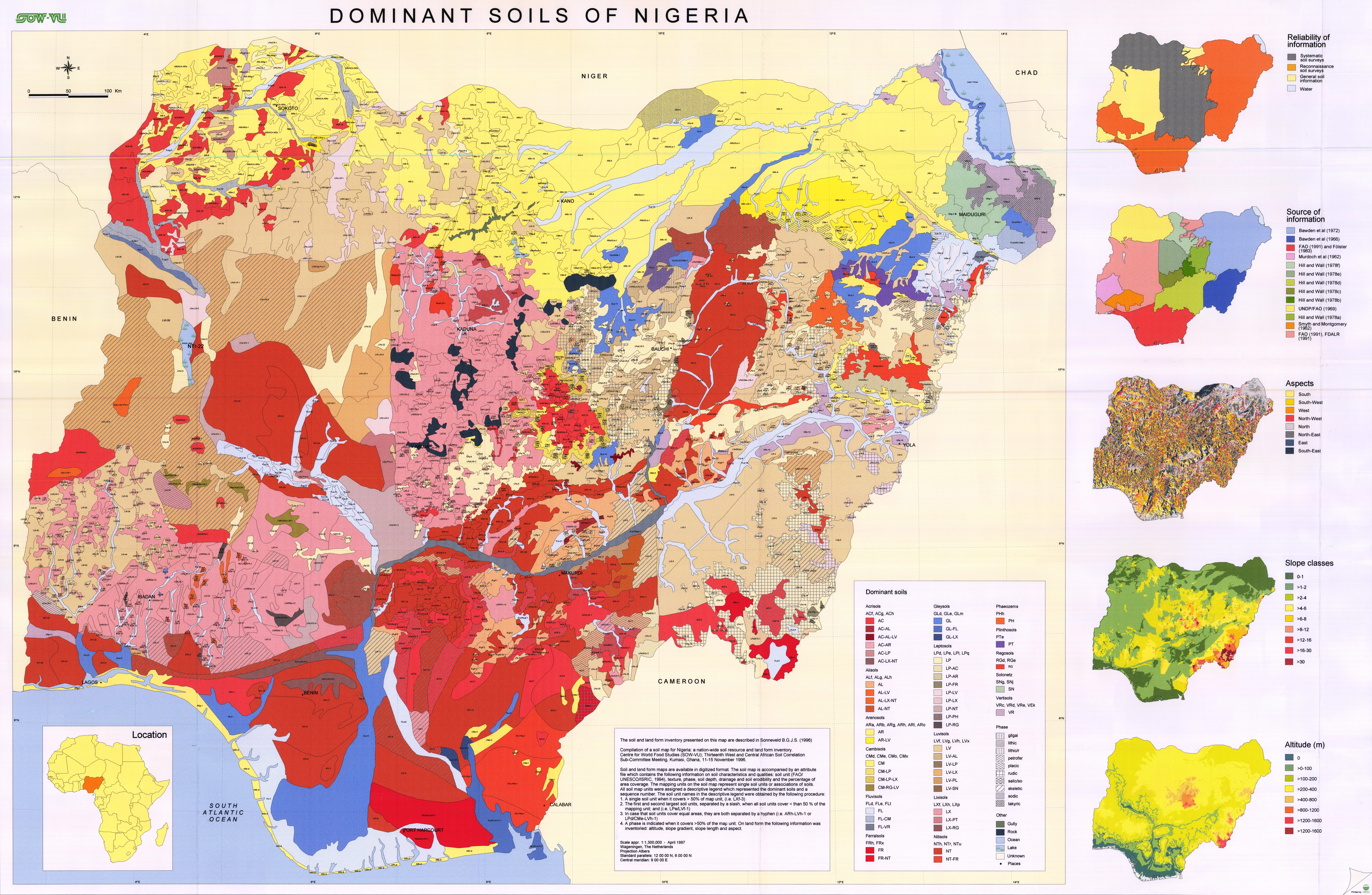
Map of the dominant soil types of Nigeria

The soils in the northern region of Nigeria are categorized as reddish brown or brown soils of the semi-arid and Arid Regions. They are also known as tropical Ferruginous Soil and are considered to be comparable to Ferric Luvisols. These are sandy soils that are made up of about 85% sand. Their pH values range between 6.0 and 7.0 and their bulk densities are about 1.4 g/cm^{3}.

Soil in most parts of northern Nigeria is Sandy characterized by low water holding capacity. Exception is the soil in Kebbi, Sokoto, Zamfara and Adamawa known as fadama soil with high water content and organic matter. Most soil in the north is rich in nitrogen phosphorus content.

=== Conservation and control of soil moisture ===
While there exist poverty in the region, as well as people who are without sufficient food, it does not appear to be a decline in crop yields. Instead, evidence suggests there has been a sustained effort to increase the production of food in an attempt to keep up with the increasing need.

== Common crops and food sources ==
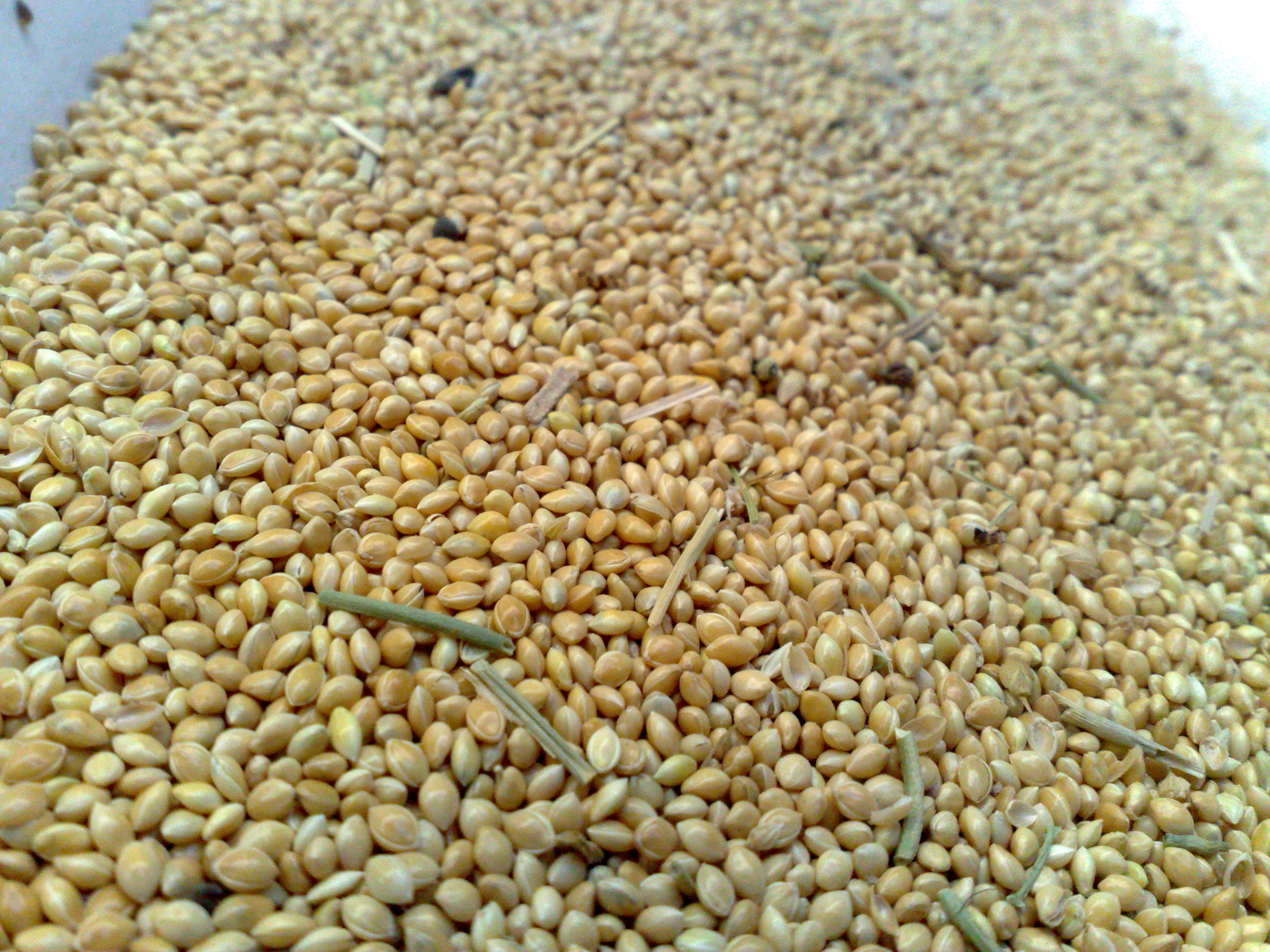
Millet seeds

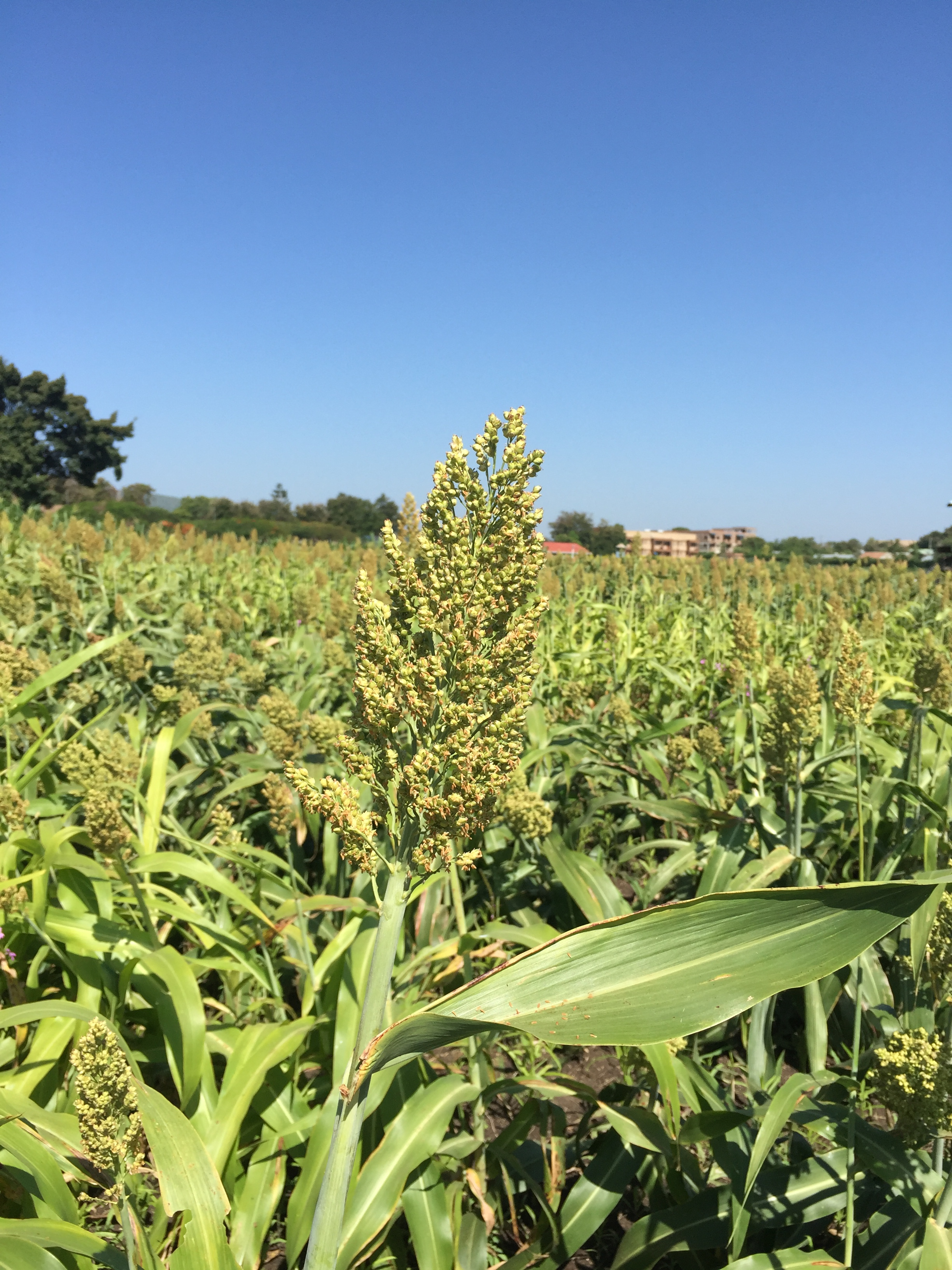
Sorghum head

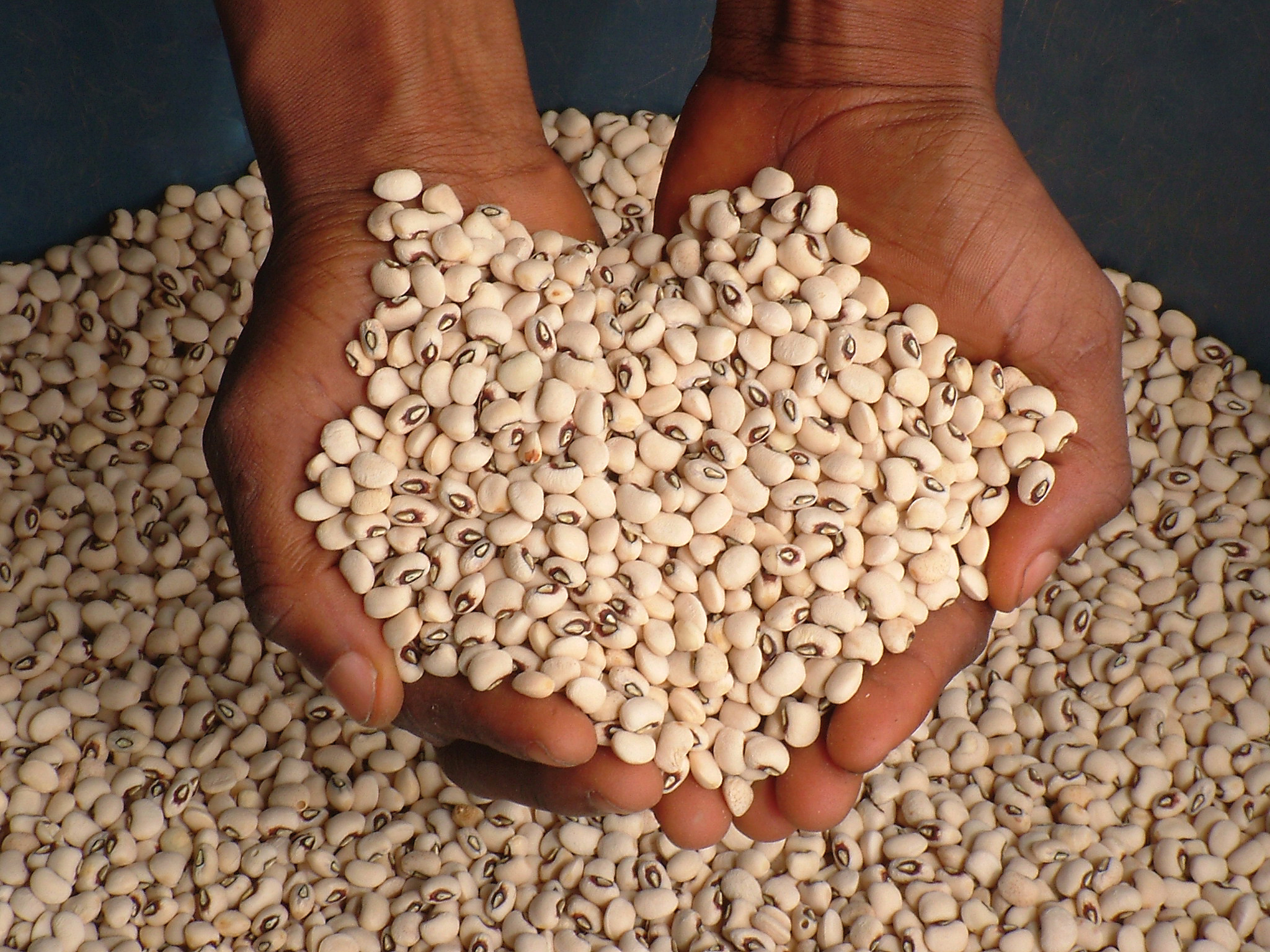
Cowpea seeds

The main crops in this area are millet, sorghum and cowpea (see Figures 4 to 6), while groundnut and sesame are considered minor crops. Guna (cow) melon (Citrullus lanatus) has been recently added to crop production for the market. It requires only one fall of rain, is planted late in the season, and grows on moisture that is left in the soil until it is harvested during the months preceding the next year's rains. This crop is a significant supplier of edible oil. Plants grown as field boundaries include the henna bush (Lawsonia inermis) as well as various grasses. Intercrop spreads are also planted among the grains; they often consist of cowpeas or groundnuts, which are nitrogen-fixing plants. A density of mature trees is also maintained.

Wild foods in northeastern Nigeria come from a wide range of plants, including trees, shrubs and various herbaceous plants. They add diversity, flavor, and important vitamins and minerals necessary for healthy growth. Furthermore, they are used as livestock fodder; in agriculture, construction, and medicines; and for cultural reasons. These potential sources of food can be found in a range of habitats from farmland (as weeds), to fallow (uncultivated land) fields and grazing lands, as well as in the settlements themselves. These foods become particularly important in times of food shortage, such as during a drought or when access to food is limited due to socio-economic issues like poverty or warfare. Common crops and food sources include millet seeds, sorghum head, and cowpea seeds.

== Agricultural timeline ==
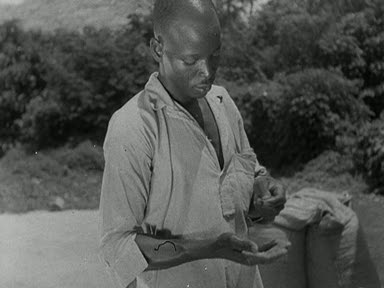
A Nigerian farmer

The preparation of fields for farming starts in April or May when the farmers clear shrubs. Sometimes grasses are burned to clear fields that have not been grazed by livestock. The beginning of the rainy season is in June or July, and this is when most planting begins, although a few farmers may dry-plant before the rains begin. Fields where germination has been successfully weeded using a locally made hoe known as the ashasha.

In September, millet is harvested, followed closely by beans. In late October or November sorghum is harvested. In addition to this, farmers who do not wish for their cereal stalks to be consumed by livestock must also harvest these. Some farmers begin planting guna melon as the millet is harvested. However, guna melon is very vulnerable to pests, so the crop doesn't always turn out well every year. They are harvested from February to April if it does.

== Cattle production ==
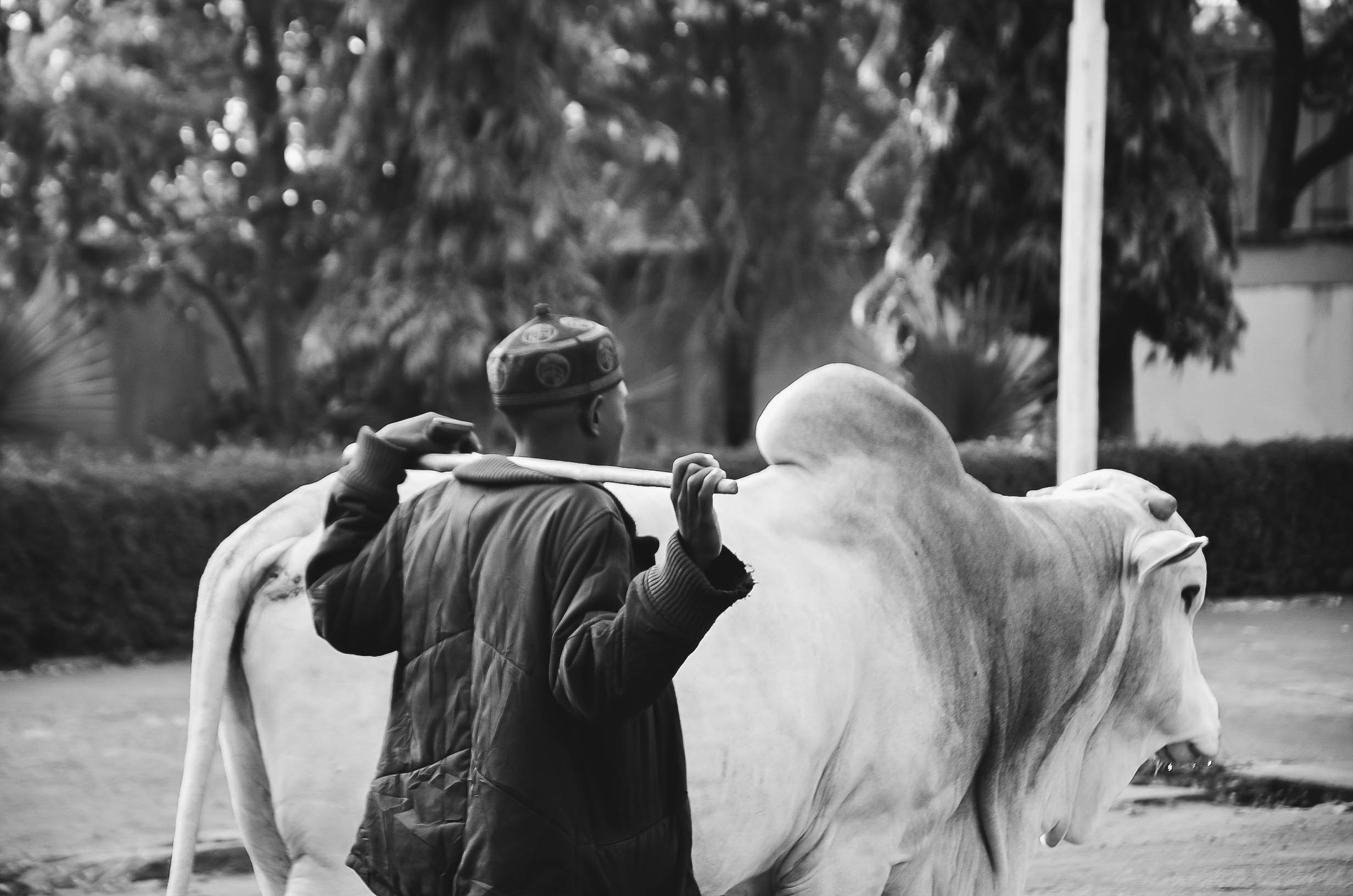
A man walking along the road with a cow

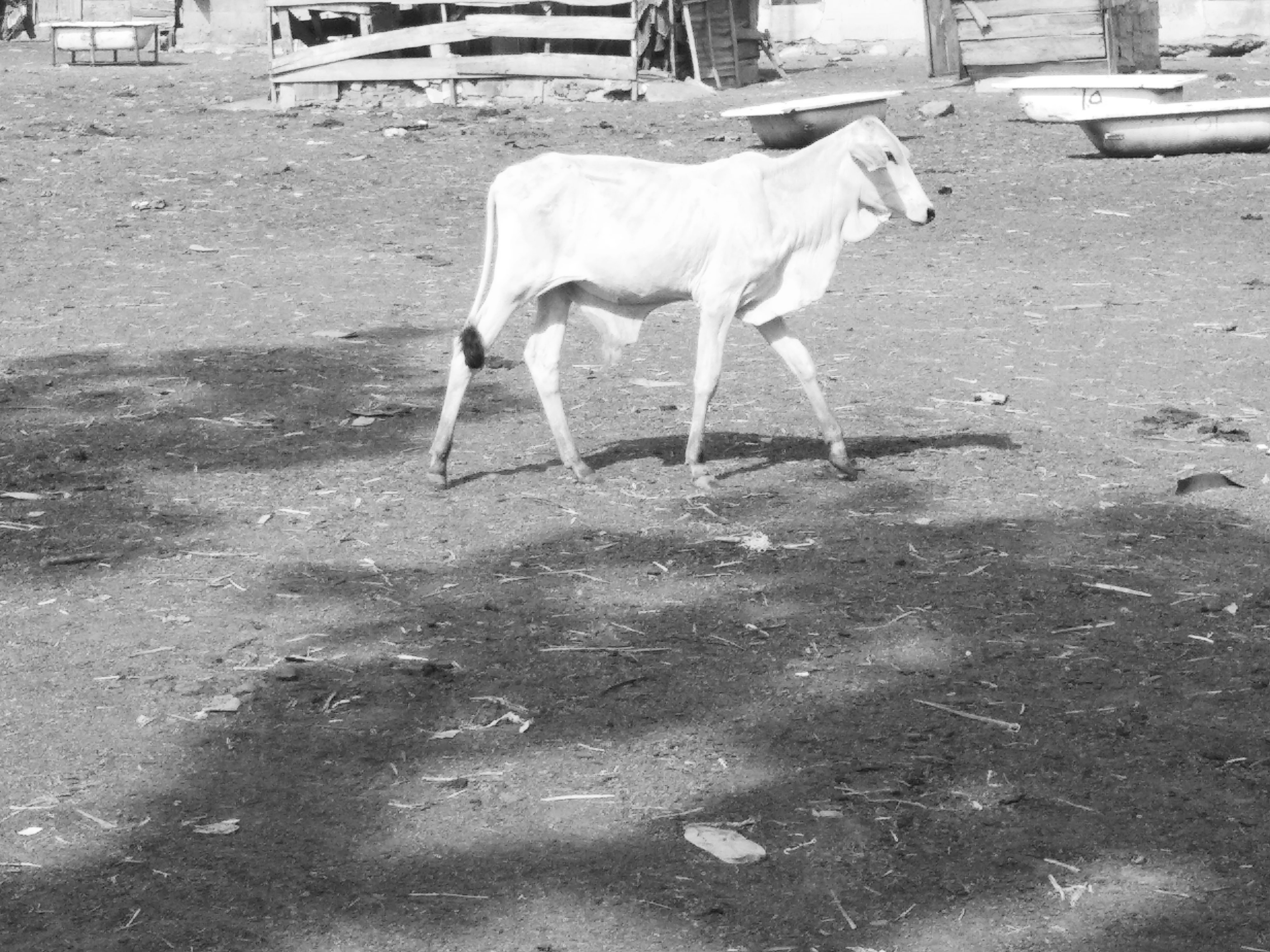
A calf

Cattle rearing in Nigeria has increased the production of meat – beef, dairy products, leather, and dung for manure, or fuel.

Cattle are bred by making herds graze on grassland. This act, however, might allow the use of land to be unsuitable for growing crops.

Breeds of cattles indigenous to the northern Nigeria include White Fulani, Red Bororo, Sokoto Gudali, Adamawa Gudali, Wadara, Azawak, Muturu, Keteku, Ndama and Kuri.

== Agricultural land use pattern ==
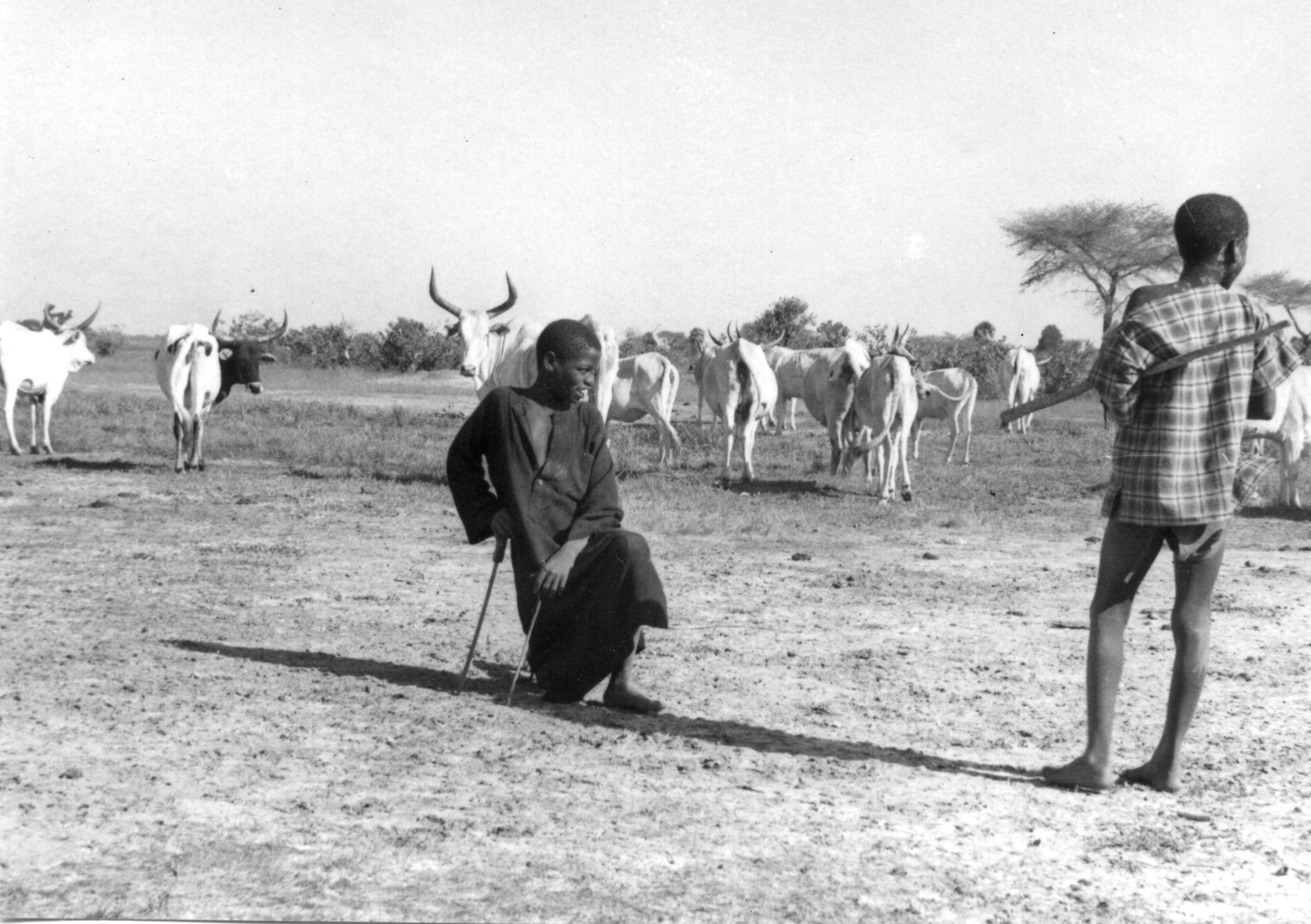
Herdsman with Fulani cattle

Traditionally there has been a division between sedentary farmers made up of the Manga and the Hausa people, and the nomadic pastoralists known as Fulani (see Figure 7). However, this has diminished, and both groups now engage in livestock and crop production, although the priority for Fulanis is still the rearing of cattle, while for the Manga and Hausa, crop production takes precedence.

In northern Nigeria, research surrounding intensive agricultural practices has been taking place for a number of decades, especially in the Kano Close-Settled Zone. In the nineteenth century, the intensive agriculture carried out in this area of dense population surrounding Kano city was noted by western visitors like Henry Barth. By the year 1913 there was a maximum of one third of farmland in fallow (Note: Fallow is a stage of crop rotation in which the land is left uncultivated, allowing nutrients to become replenished.) in any particular year. The population densities of the rural area in this region climbed from 243 to 348 people per square kilometer between 1962 and 1991, but the land area under permanent cultivation remained approximately the same. In this time period the cultivated land per capital went from 0.36 to 0.29 hectares. However, there was no evidence of any significant decrease in the fertility of the cereal. Furthermore, the average cereal crop yields as well as number of farm trees remained constant.

=== Agricultural development ===
Development plans for Nigeria, such as the Third Development Plan (1975–1980), have focused on the belief that the best way to achieve an increase in productivity is through new and usually imported technology combined with the teaching of farmers to become commercial businessmen. This paradigm shift assumes that larger and more sophisticated farming schemes are more able to produce surplus food in a marketable quantity. The focus is on management, agricultural companies, and wealthier farmers, while the poorest farmers, and in fact the bulk of farmers, are ignored. Little attention was given to strategies which may aid the bulk of the farmers in the region, such as improved roads, labor, marketing, and land co-operatives.

This type of development plan is exemplified by the Kano River Project in Kadawa which was built primarily for the production of wheat (Note: Wheat is a temperate crop that is not well adapted to tropical climates, but is imported in large quantities to produce bread for the urban populations in the region.) in the dry season. This large scale irrigation scheme combined large costs for set-up, (Note: A large portion of this initial investment did not remain within the country.) with significant ongoing costs for farmers since they needed to pay for the use of equipment like Tractors, seeds, and pesticides. The productivity of wheat achieved through this production method was well below the projections made by the Dutch consulting firm NEDECO, which was involved with this project. The Kano River Project endeavored to radically change the farming system from one where farmers primarily grew their own food and were essentially self-sufficient, to one where they grew food for the market and must buy food to meet their own needs. Given the problems, and few realized benefits, associated with this type of agriculture the farmers of this region were quite resistant to these massive changes and the Kano River Project is only a fraction of the extent that was planned. Furthermore, large scale irrigation projects such as these have a characteristically poor performance record and are often associated with the salinization (Note: Salinization is the build-up of salts in the soil. It is also often used to refer to alkalization which is the build-up of alkalis in the soil.) of soils.

Historically, in sub-Saharan Africa intensive agriculture carried out by indigenous peoples has been the exception rather than the rule. Until recently, this area has been characterized by a large amount of land with a relatively small labor force available to work this land. Most Africans have simply moved when confronted with increasing population and declining crop yields. Views surrounding agricultural development, especially in the 1960s and 1970s, were developed with an opinion that disvalued traditional, or what has been termed indigenous, knowledge. Intensification has been perceived in technical terms which are very narrowly defined, with an emphasis on machinery, pesticides, and synthetic chemical fertilizers, and where industrial factory production systems replace reliance upon the local ecosystem and local agropastoral (mixed farming) by-products in a labor-intensive process. This process involves the close integration of the raising of livestock with agriculture to maintain soil fertility.

==== The Kano Close-Settled Zone: A Case Study ====
An example of the close integration between agriculture and the raising of livestock occurs in the Kano Close-Settled Zone of Nigeria. This account is significant due to the scale and length of time over which the region has carried out intensive farming. With a population of approximately five (5) million in the region excluding the more than one and a half million living in Kano city, the challenges facing the people of the area, in terms of meeting their growing needs are great. More than eighty-five per cent of the surface land in this area is dedicated to farmland, and the farmers themselves are strongly oriented towards the conservation of land resources. They pay more attention to the protection of organic matter in the soil than other things. This is demonstrated by their management of animals and their wastes. During the dry season, animals are only penned at night and are left free to roam the fields by day. Although, they are confined to their pens and fed on cut fodder during the growing season, their bedding and manure are mixed and returned to the fields. In addition to this, crop residue, tree browse, and weeds are fed to the animals thereby recycling the Nutrients.

=== Land-use resource planning and technology ===
A major limitation is land which is a major resource in agricultural. The interrelationship between ecology and economics cannot be underemphasized as in the northern Nigeria there is a long spell of dryness in the dry season and when it is wet, the rains pour. The ability to leverage on technology is a gamechanger for sustainability in agricultural practices in the North with the availability of accurate data a significant plus.

== See also ==
- Herder–farmer conflicts in Nigeria
- Agriculture in Nigeria
- Agriculture
