= Agriculture in Nigeria =

Development of agricultural output of Nigeria in 2015 US$ since 1961

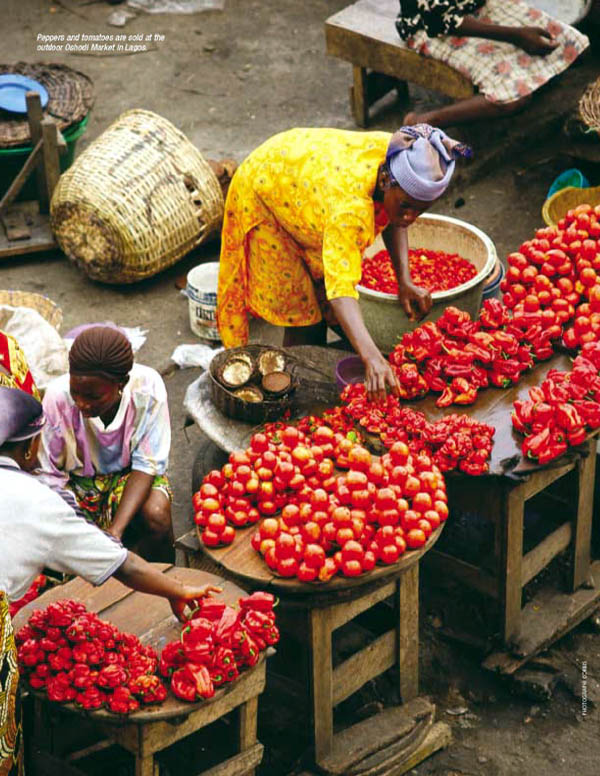
Oshodi Market in Lagos

Agriculture is a major sector of the Nigerian economy, accounting for up to 35% of total employment in 2020. According to the FAO, agriculture remains the foundation of the Nigerian economy, providing livelihood for most Nigerians and generating millions of jobs. Along with crude oil, Nigeria relies on the agricultural products it exports to generate most of its national revenue. The agricultural sector in Nigeria comprises four sub-sectors: crop production, livestock, forestry, and fishing.

Nigeria has a total agricultural area of 70.8 million hectares, of which 34 million hectares are arable land, 6.5 million hectares are used for permanent crops, and 30.3 million hectares are meadows and pastures.

Maize (corn), cassava, Guinea corn (sorghum), groundnut (peanut) and yam are the major crops farmed in Nigeria, with 70% of the households engaged in crop farming. In the south, 7.3% of the households practice fishing, while 69.3% of the households own or raise livestock in northwest Nigeria.

In the third quarter of 2019, before the COVID-19 pandemic, the sector grew by 14.88% year-on-year. Crop production remains the largest part of the sector. During the third quarter of 2019, the agriculture sector contributed 29.25% to the overall real GDP. Between January and March 2021, agriculture contributed 22.35% of the total gross domestic product.

The sector is undergoing transformation through commercialization at the small, medium, and large enterprise levels. However, there are several factors in the Nigerian agricultural sector that may prevent its growth, including a land tenure system that limits access to land, the country's level of irrigation development, limited adoption of research findings and technologies, costs of farm inputs, the amount of access to credit allowed by the management of specialized institutions established for the development of the agricultural sector, the manners of fertilizer procurement and distribution, storage facility effectiveness, and the amount of access to markets.

More recently, changes in average temperatures, rainfall, climate extremes, and the growing infestation of pests and related diseases precipitated by climate change pose a challenge to the integrity of the country's agriculture system. This is coupled with a dependence on rain-fed agriculture, which has made the sector vulnerable to seasonal conditions.

These all contribute to agricultural productivity and post-harvest losses and waste in Nigeria. Illiteracy is also one of the several factors preventing the progress and development of agriculture in Nigeria. Research has proven that most of the farmers in Nigeria have not acquired formal education.

== Dynamics ==
At the time of Nigeria's independence (1960), food exports made up more than 70% of the country's Gross National Product (GNP). However, over the next 25 years, the situation reversed, with food items accounting for over 50% of imports. Despite having fertile land, food output in Nigeria declined, and per capita food production also decreased, leading to a more than sevenfold increase in grain imports.

In the 1970s, the Nigerian government promoted the use of inorganic fertilizers to address the issue. By 1990, out of Nigeria's total land area of about 91 million hectares, 82 million hectares were found to be suitable for farming, but only 42% of the cultivable area was farmed. The "bush fallow system," which involves land being left idle for a period of time to allow natural regeneration of soil fertility, was commonly used. Additionally, 18 million hectares were classified as permanent pasture, but had the potential to support crops, and most of the 20 million hectares covered by forests and woodlands were believed to have agricultural potential.

Agricultural holdings are small and scattered, and farming is carried out with simple tools. Large-scale agriculture is not common. Agriculture contributed 32% to GDP in 2001.

Nigeria’s Agricultural Import Bill surged 30% to N920 billion in Q1 2024, underscoring the nation's growing reliance on imported agricultural products like wheat and essential foods to meet consumer demand, which domestic farming struggles to satisfy. Nigeria's imported food inflation grew to over 36.38% in June 2024 according to reports.

This dependence on imports presents challenges for Nigeria’s agricultural sector, potentially reducing local production due to cheaper, more accessible imported goods. This competitive market environment poses risks to the sector’s long-term sustainability and development.

=== Animal Agriculture ===
Animal husbandry, deals with the cultivation, management, and production of domestic animals, it involves the improvement of the qualities considered desirable by humans by means of breeding.

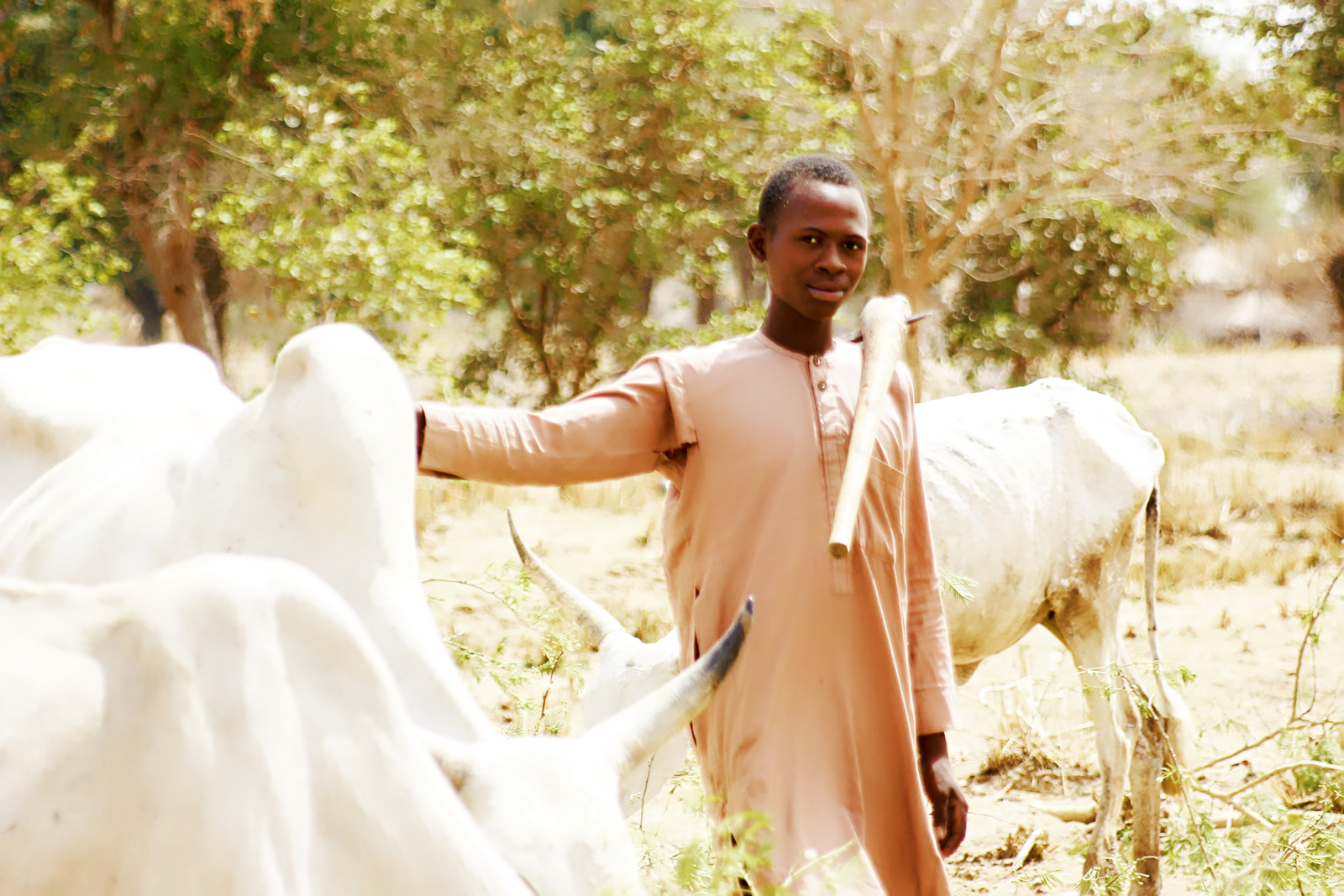
A farmer and his cow

The majority of herders in African countries are livestock owners. Livestock farming is a part of Nigeria's agriculture system. In 2017, Nigeria had approximately over 80 million poultry farming, 76 million goats, 43.4 million sheep, 18.4 million cattle, 7.5 million pigs, and 1.4 million of its equivalent. Livestock farming is about 5% of Nigeria's gross domestic product and 17% of its agricultural gross domestic product.

In Nigeria, there is always an increase in meat demand and this is seen as an economic development growth. Animal husbandry in Nigeria therefore has changed the narrative due to population growth in urbanization and agricultural practices. Traditional nomadic pastoralism has transitioned to sedentary and intensive grazing, leading to the increased pressure on gazetted areas. Overgrazing, particularly in fragile ecosystems such as the savannas and woodland areas, has caused loss of vegetation, soil, and biodiversity. Types of Animal agriculture in Nigeria are:

=== Livestock ===
Nigeria is a significant hub of producing item utilization in West Africa. It is also one of the major livestock-producing nations in the district. Meeting the consistently expanding domestic demand and access to these markets are major economic stakes for Nigeria and for the adjoining Sahel nations that raise livestock. With its population and capacity for animal production, with 25% of the region's livestock herds, Nigeria is the leading animal producer in Central and West Africa.

The country's dairy cattle groups are assessed at north of 16 million head, a long ways in front of Niger (8.7 million), Mali (8.2 million) and Chad (7 million). The portion of Sahel nations is huge, nonetheless, addressing more than half of absolute steers groups. Cows bringing up in Nigeria is to a great extent enhanced by short-cycle domesticated animals tasks, assessed at 33.8 million head of sheep and 175 million poultry birds.

The livestock and agriculture sector in recent times have been facing threats of collapse due to recent rise in insecurity in the northern part of the Country.

== Nigerian Domesticated animals Tasks Face Huge Impediments to Improvement ==
Domesticated animals raising is a significant area of movement in Nigeria, however it is likely to a few significant imperatives. Accessible field land is subsiding essentially as urban communities and cultivating grow. Admittance to creature farming sources of info appears to be lacking and specialized help for animal wellbeing deficient. Steers are brought basically up in the Sudan-Sahel district of the northern states, where agro-peaceful exercises for the most part include occasional and cross-line relocation to exploit Sahel pastures in the stormy season. Below are some obstacles to improve:

- Rising Meat Utilization and Changing Food Propensities.

The solid ascent popular for creature items is expected not exclusively to the high pace of urbanization (60% of Nigerians are city occupants), however most importantly to customers' more prominent buying power and the development of another working class. Besides, this exchange monster represents almost 60% of global exchange the locale. Simultaneously, an ever-increasing number of buyers need better meat from directed slaughterhouses. Some modern meat organizations are currently sectioning the market, selling frozen meat bundled in individual parts. Drive-through eateries fit to this new sort of shopper are additionally growing quickly. A few examples of significant worth chain coordination are likewise being viewed as the area develops, with a couple of organizations handling meat in their own slaughterhouses provided by their own organizations of makers. Albeit this last fragment is developing, it actually represents under 10% of the general meat item market. In spite of these arising elements, many individuals actually don't approach Sahel hamburger, which is considered to be too costly by less-well-off fragments of the populace. In this way, according to the all out populace, meat utilization in Nigeria is still underneath the territorial normal (2 kg for each individual and each year in Nigeria, contrasted with 8 kg for every individual each year in ECOWAS).

- Head Animals Shipping lanes in Focal and West Africa These courses run in a north-to-south heading from the Sahel to seaside markets. Many merge enormously towards Nigeria, at the core of this mainland sub-locale (source: IRAM, 2009)
- The Improvement of Nigerian Animal Cultivating

A Basic Stake for the League, its Reproducers' Associations, and the Adjoining Animals Bringing Nations up in the Sahel. Making more meat items accessible quickly, moves toward reinforce the seriousness of domesticated animals tasks, support of private interest in this area — Nigerian domesticated animals strategy measures are firmly centered around concentrated animals tasks and on imports from nations that have fostered an animals industry. Both of these strategy choices depend on the utilization of a lot of grains, the accessibility and cost of which differ significantly with the changes underway in the Sahel and all over the planet. One can likewise keep thinking about whether this animals monster's approaches have adequately resolved the issues of agropastoral creation and working on the concurrence between animals reproducers and ranchers (a few in some cases exceptionally horrendous struggles broke out in 2009 and 2010 in the provinces of Bauchi, Nasarawa, Benue, Level and Ebonyi). Straightforwardly connected with populace development, crowd developments in Nigeria and admittance to feed and watering spots are difficult issues. The issue is in this way, more intensely than in other Sahel nations, one of making roaming crowding safer. Animals bringing up in the Sahel locale assumes a significant part in Nigeria. The reciprocal connection between domesticated animals bringing up in the North and in the South ought to be reinforced, without undercutting meat from the Sahel. Costs ought to more readily represent the scope of chance factors, the quantity of go-betweens and the vacillation of money trade rates. As the number of inhabitants in urban communities and towns in the Sahel develops, this meat will positively turn out to be more costly, and accordingly more "specific" corresponding to customers' buying power. In the ongoing 10 years, the Sahel nations will be unable to fulfill the Nigerian hamburger need in sum, however can in any case assume a significant part helping their separate economies. Sahel hamburger creation should accomplish other things to fulfill quality prerequisites. The steers headed to showcase from the Sahel are much of the time rather lean, and that implies that they should be filled out at middle of the road locales situated on the two sides of the line. To all the more efficiently and all the more quickly stuff dairy cattle for market, the limitations on admittance to take care of should be survived. This implies that animals reproducers' associations should get more political power in exchanges with industrialists (who produce wheat, presscake, and so forth.). This additionally implies that procedures should be found to work on the handling of rural side-effects. These are a portion of the difficulties confronting reproducers' associations as they try to work on their individuals' livelihoods and backing the cows raising area.

=== Poultry ===
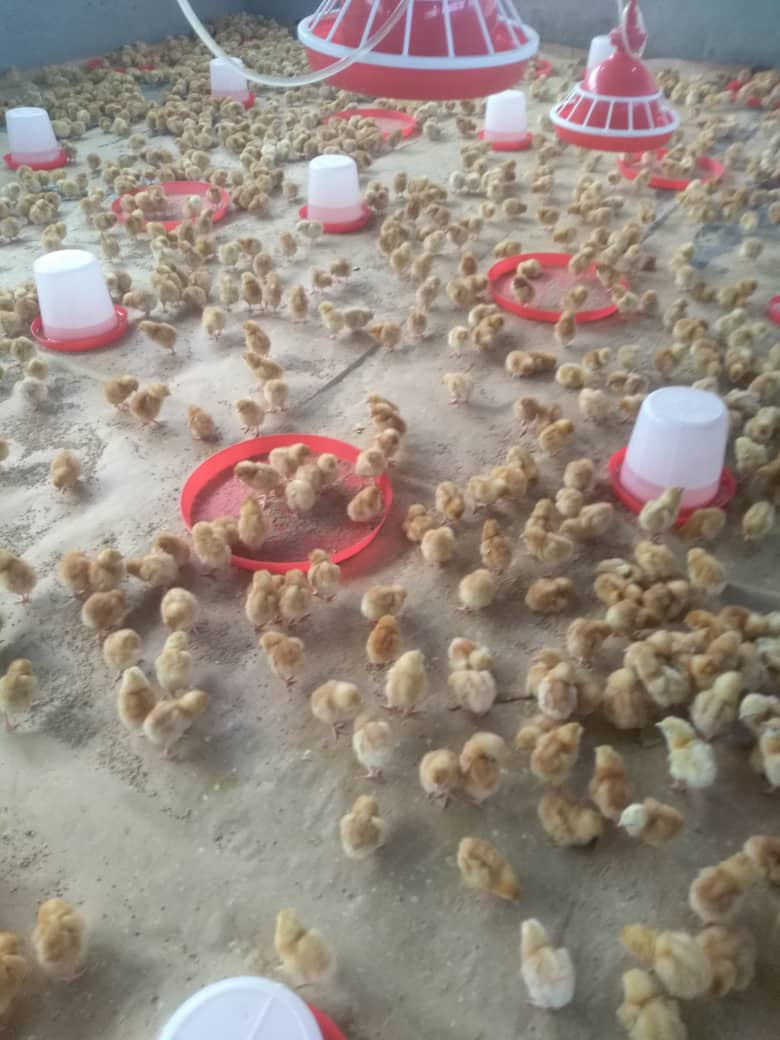
Poultry farm in Lokoja

Chickens are more normal than other poultry birds. They are of various classes going from pullets (layers), grills, and noilers. The grills are for the most part utilized for meat creation while the layers are for egg creation. The most favored breeds in Nigeria incorporate the Marshall, ISA Brown, Cobb, Bovans Dark, Cornish Cross, Arbor Section of land Furthermore, K-22 Moyer, and the Cornish Goliaths. Ranchers gain stock from incubators either from day-old (DOCs), or fourteen days old enough, or mark of-lay pullets (15-17 weeks old enough) from believed great family producer ranches.

The poultry executives frameworks being used are:

- The free roaming framework, where birds are raised primarily for family utilization. They are permitted to meander openly around the area looking for food and water. This framework is more normal in far off provincial networks
- The semi-serious framework, where the birds are permitted to meander around however are as yet furnished with haven, and little amounts of business feed to supplement and compensate for shortfalls in their searched f
- The concentrated framework, where birds are restricted to enclosures or houses where sufficient feed, water, wellbeing administrations are given. It is partitioned into profound litter and battery confine frameworks. Because of the effectiveness of this framework, it is more normal in the southern locales of the nation, where business poultry creation is on a fleeting ascent.

== Production ==
In 2022, Nigeria produced:

- 59.6 million tons of cassava (the largest producer in the world). Nigeria accounts for up to 20% of the world's cassava production, about 34 per cent of Africa's, and about 46% of West Africa's;
- 47.5 million tons of yam (the largest producer in the world);
- 3.3 million tons of taro (the largest producer in the world);
- 2.6 million tons of cowpea (the largest producer in the world);
- 6.8 million tons of sorghum (the largest producer in the world);
- 2 million tons of okra (2nd largest producer in the world, second only to India);
- 2.8 million tons of peanut (3rd largest producer in the world, second only to China and India);
- 4 million tons of sweet potato (3rd largest producer in the world, second only to China and Malawi);
- 369 thousand tons of ginger (3rd largest producer in the world, losing only to India and China);
- 2.2 million tons of millet (4th largest producer in the world, second only to India, Niger, and Sudan);
- 7.8 million tons of palm oil (4th largest producer in the world, second only to Indonesia, Malaysia, and Thailand);
- 572 thousand tons of sesame seed (4th largest producer in the world, losing only to Sudan, Myanmar, and India);
- 332 thousand tons of cocoa (4th largest producer in the world, second only to Ivory Coast, Ghana, and Indonesia);
- 3 million tons of plantain (5th largest producer in the world);
- 833 thousand tons of papaya (6th largest producer in the world);
- 1.6 million tons of pineapple (7th largest producer in the world);
- 3.9 million tons of tomato (11th largest producer in the world);
- 6.8 million tons of rice (one of the largest producers of rice in Africa, 14th largest producer in the world);
- 10.1 million tons of maize (14th largest producer in the world);
- 7.5 million tons of vegetables;
- 1.4 million tons of sugarcane;
- 1.3 million tons of potato;
- 949 thousand tons of mango (including mangosteen and guava);
- 938 thousand tons of onion;
- 758 thousand tons of soy;
- 747 thousand tons of green pepper;
- 585 thousand tons of egusi;
- 263 thousand tons of sheanut;
- 150 thousand tons of coconut.

In addition to smaller productions of other agricultural products, Nigeria produced about 2.2 million metric tons of fish in 2008.

== Agricultural products ==
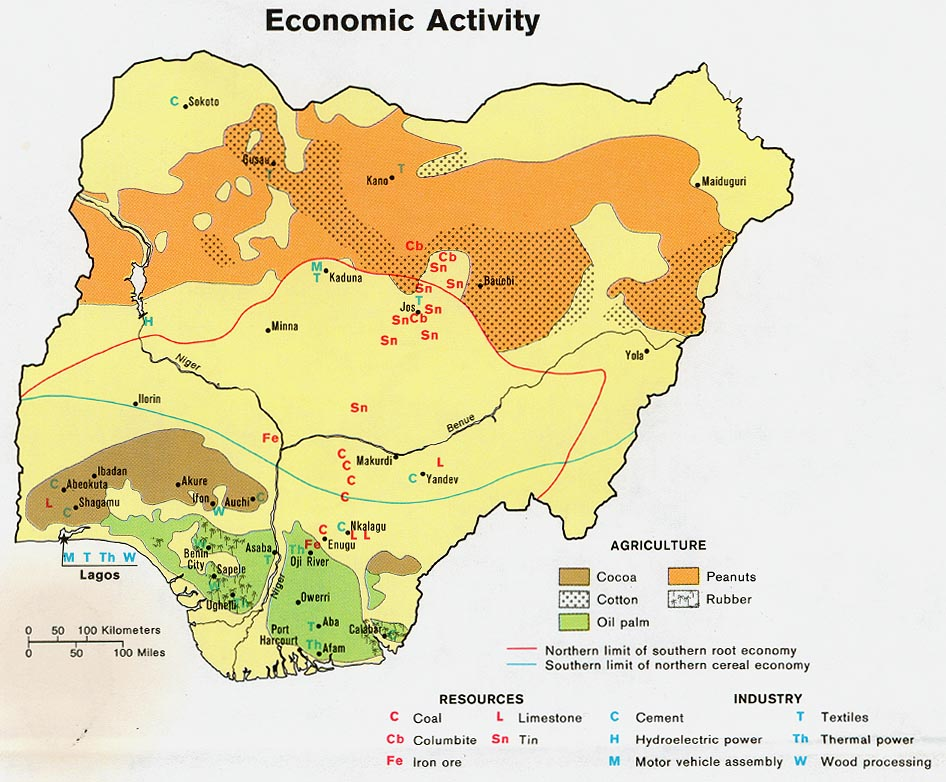
A map of Nigeria's main agricultural products

Crops grown in Nigeria include beans, rice, sesame, cashew nuts, cassava, cocoa beans, groundnuts, gum arabic, kolanut, cocoa, maize (corn), melon, millet, palm kernels, palm oil, plantains, rice, rubber, sorghum, soybeans, bananas, and yams.

In the past, Nigeria was known for the export of groundnut and palm kernel oil. However, over the years, the rate of exportation of these products has decreased. A few years ago, local Nigerian companies started exporting groundnuts, cashew nuts, sesame seeds, moringa seeds, ginger, cocoa, and other crops.

The country's agricultural products fall into two main groups: food crops produced for home consumption and cash crops sold for profits and exported abroad. Prior to the Nigerian Civil War, the country was self-sufficient in food, but that decreased after 1973. Bread made from American wheat replaced domestic crops as the cheapest staple food. Between 1980 and 2016, yam production increased from about 5 million tonnes to 44 million tonnes.

Tonnes produced in	1980	2000	2016
Maize	612,000	4,107,000	764,678
Millet	2,824,000	5,814,000	1,468,668
Guinea corn	3,690,000	7,711,000	6,939,335
Yam	5,250,000	26,210,000	44,109,615
Cassava	11,500,000	32,697,000	57,134,478
Rice, paddy	1,090,000	3,298,000	6,070,813
Melon seed	94,000	345,000	569,398
Cocoyam	208,000	3,886,000	3,175,842
Sesame seed	15,000	72,000	460,988

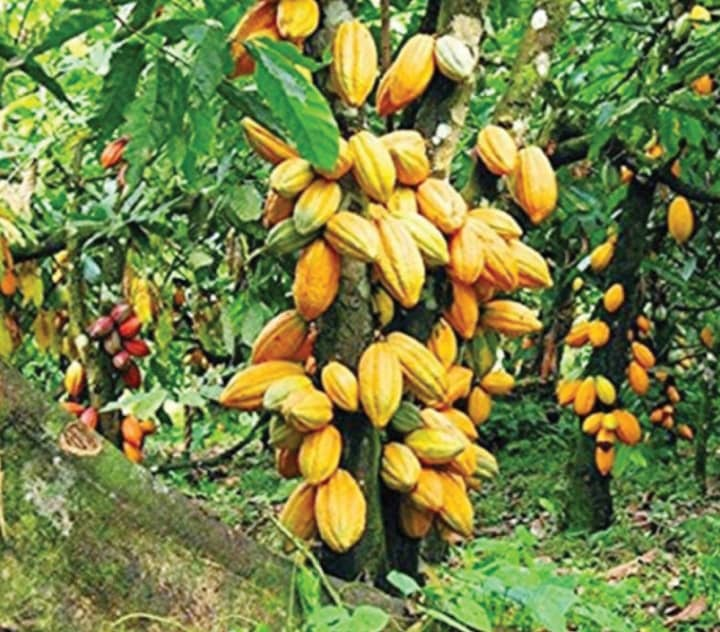
Ripe Cocoa Pods Ready for Harvesting

=== Cocoa ===
Cocoa is the largest non-oil foreign exchange earner, but the dominance of smallholders and lack of farm labour due to urbanization hold back production. Some other factors holding back the production of cocoa include financing, a lack of a coordinating body, and low uptake of newer varieties of seedlings to rehabilitate old and cultivate new plantations. These factors are identified by multiple stakeholders.Reviving Nigeria's Cocoa Industry

The challenges have displaced the country from being the second-largest producer of cocoa beans to being the fourth, overtaken by Côte d'Ivoire, Ghana, and Indonesia. In 1969, Nigeria produced 145,000 tons of cocoa beans; however, it has the potential to produce over 300,000 per year. The Nigerian Government may give more incentives to cocoa farmers to increase productivity.

=== Rubber ===
Rubber is the second-largest non-oil foreign exchange earner. Rubber

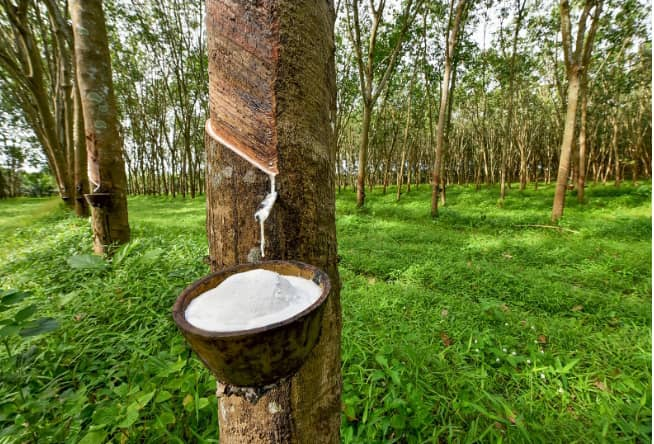
Latex Extract from Rubber Tree in Ogun state

is grown across different states in Nigeria, including the Edo, Delta, Ondo, Ogun, Abia, Anambra, Akwa Ibom, Cross Rivers, Ebonyi, and Bayelsa states.

Natural rubber plays a vital role in Nigeria's economy, serving three key purposes: it supplies raw materials to agro-based industries, generates foreign exchange earnings, and establishes Nigeria as a prominent exporter of rubber on the global stage, while also providing employment opportunities to a significant number of rural farmers. In 2022, Nigeria was the largest exporter of Rubber with exports in rubber rising to around 84.5 million dollars.

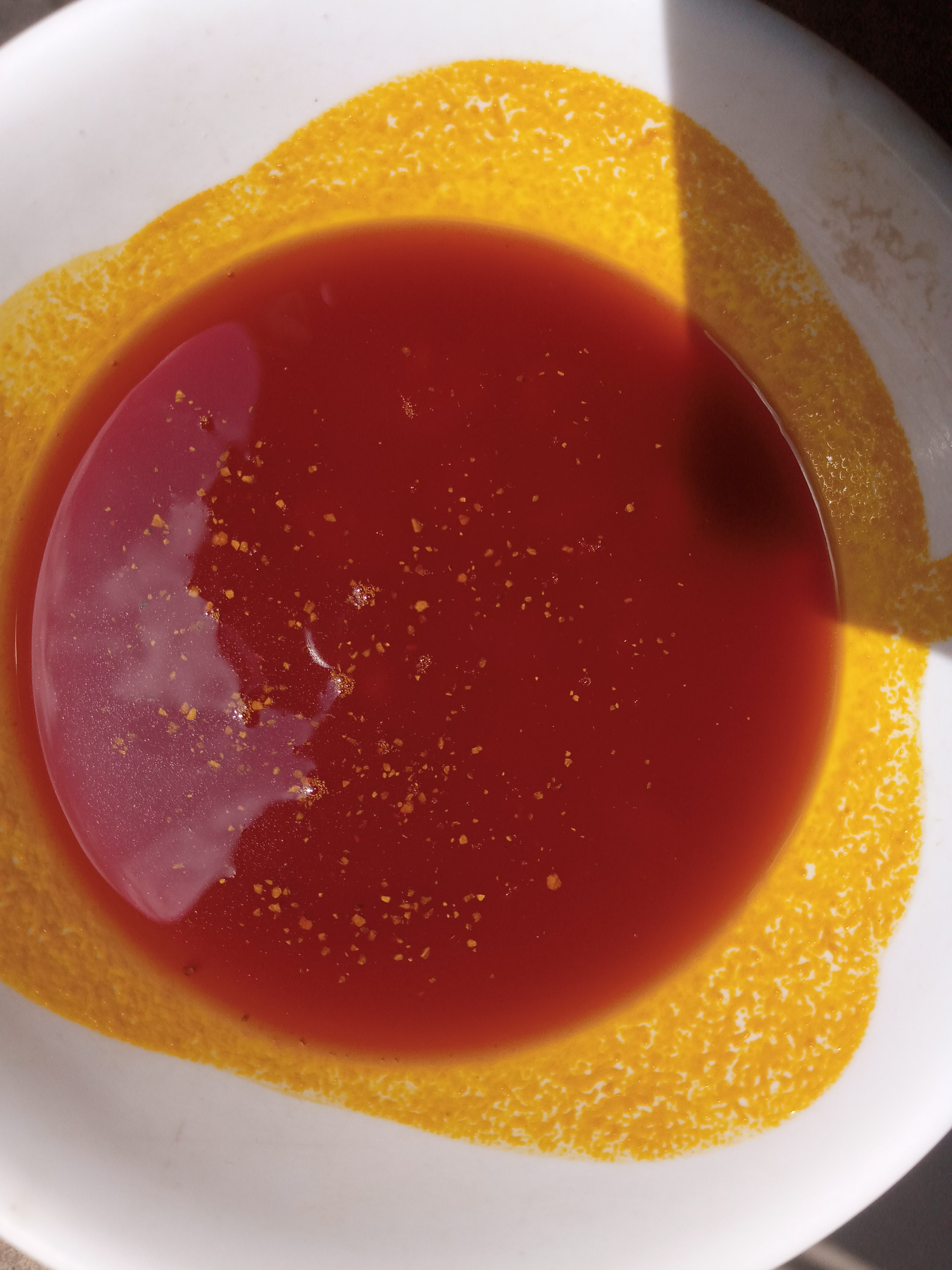
Palm oil an edible oil that comes from the fruit of the oil palm tree

=== Palm oil ===
Palm oil is high in carotenes, which are precursors to vitamin A, tocopherols, and antioxidants, palm oil is mostly used for cooking and frying in Nigeria. It has led to interest in using palm oil as a natural source of vitamin A in Africa.

Although oil palm plantations and estates occupy over 118,264 hectares, they account for merely 5% of Nigeria's total crude palm oil production. Although palm kernel cake is well-known in West plantations as a useful feed ingredient, it was mostly utilized as a source of fiber and energy in rations for fish, fowl, and pigs until recently.

The palm oil industry constitutes another sector of the Nigerian economy, providing food and raw materials for the food, cosmetics, pharmaceuticals, plastics, and bio-energy industries. In Nigeria, the institute with information about oil palm is the Nigeria Institute for Oil Palm Research. The formal mandate of the institute is to conduct research into the production and products of oil palm and other palms of economic relevance and transfer its research findings to farmers.

As of 2023, Edo state holds the top position in palm oil production in Nigeria, thanks to significant contributions from Flourmills Nigeria, Dufil, and Saro Africa, who have collectively cultivated thousands of hectares of oil palm plantations in the state.

=== Cash crop production ===
==== Cash crop production in Nigeria in 2000, 20, and 2020 ====
Tonnes produced in	1980	2000	2016
Oil palm fruit	5,750,000	8,220,000	7,817,207
Cocoa	153,000	338,000	236,521
Groundnut	471,000	2,901,000	3,028,571
Kola nut	135,000	82,000	143,829
Ginger	200	98,000	522,964

=== Traditional native crops ===
Traditional native cereals such as fonio (Digitaria exilis and Digitaria iburua) are still grown in the Middle Belt of central Nigeria.

Other traditional native crops in Nigeria are:

- Bambara groundnut
- Hausa groundnut
- Fluted pumpkin
- Castor bean
- Melegueta pepper
- Cola nut
- Green amaranth
- Cowpea
- Roselle
- Okra

== Fishing ==
Fisheries production particularly from marine is significant for the financial advancement of Nigerians and its commitment to the country's monetary development through the GDP (Gross domestic product).

== Ministry of Agriculture ==
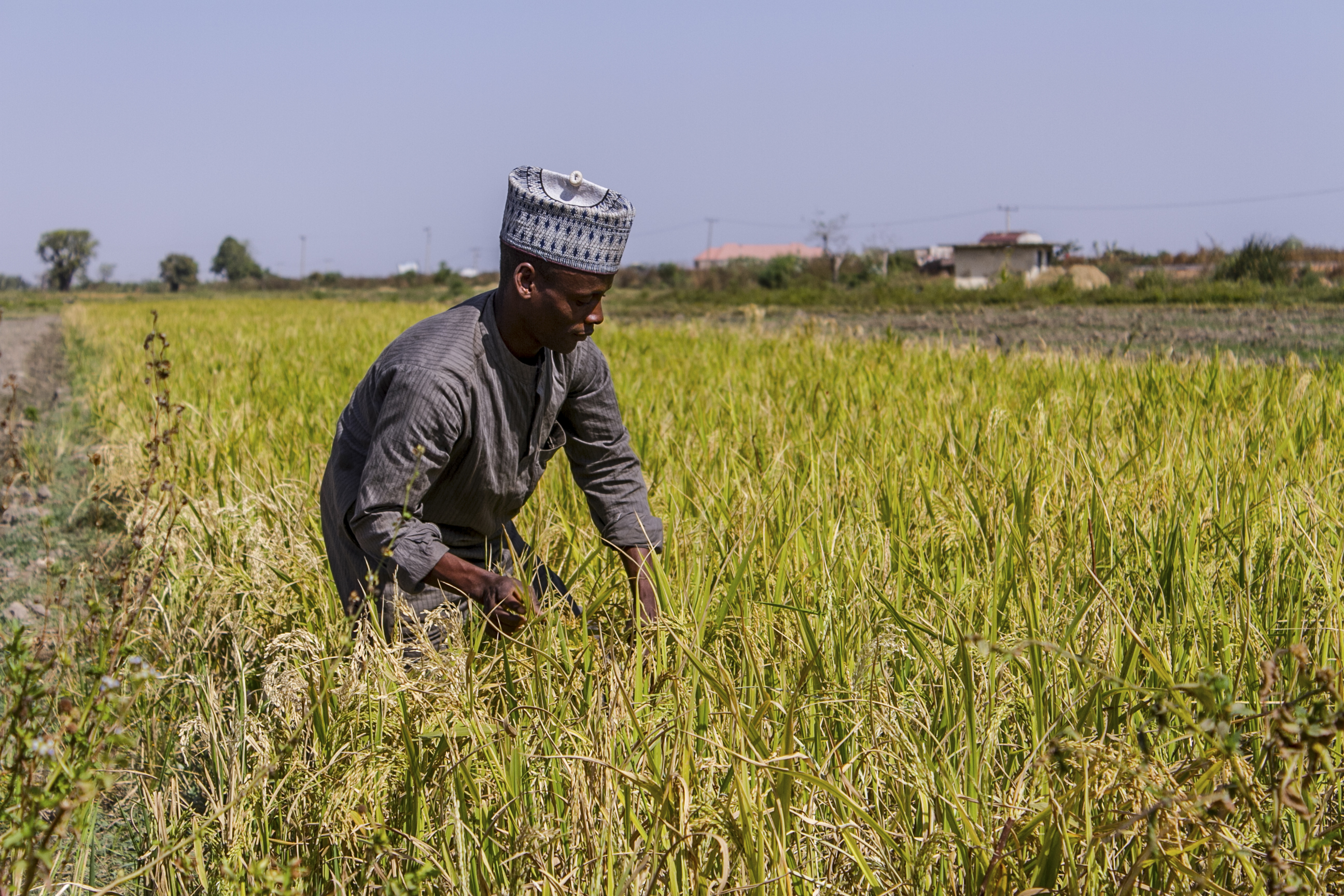
A rice paddy field in Nigeria

The government office responsible for agriculture development and transformation in Nigeria is currently the Federal Ministry of Agriculture and Rural Development. Primarily funded by Nigeria's federal government, the Ministry currently supervises almost fifty parastatals operating as either departments or agencies across the country. The Ministry has two major departments, namely the Technical and Service Departments:

- Technical Department: Manages agriculture (trees and crops), fisheries, livestock, land resources, fertilizer, food reserve and storage, and rural development.
- Service Department: Manages finance, human resources, procurement, PPAS (plan, policy, analysis and statistics), and co-operatives.

The ministry was headed by Audu Ogbeh, who was appointed by President Muhammad Buhari on 12 November 2015, succeeding Akinwumi Adesina, who was elected to head Africa Development Bank. Buhari had also appointed Heineken Lokpobiri as the new Minister of State for Agriculture and Shehu Ahmad as the Permanent Secretary under the newly created Ministry of Agriculture and Rural Development.

In 2023, President Bola Ahmed Tinubu changed the name of the Ministry of Agriculture to the Ministry of Agriculture and Food security and appointed Senator Abubakar Kyari as the Minister of Agriculture and Food Security.

=== Policies ===
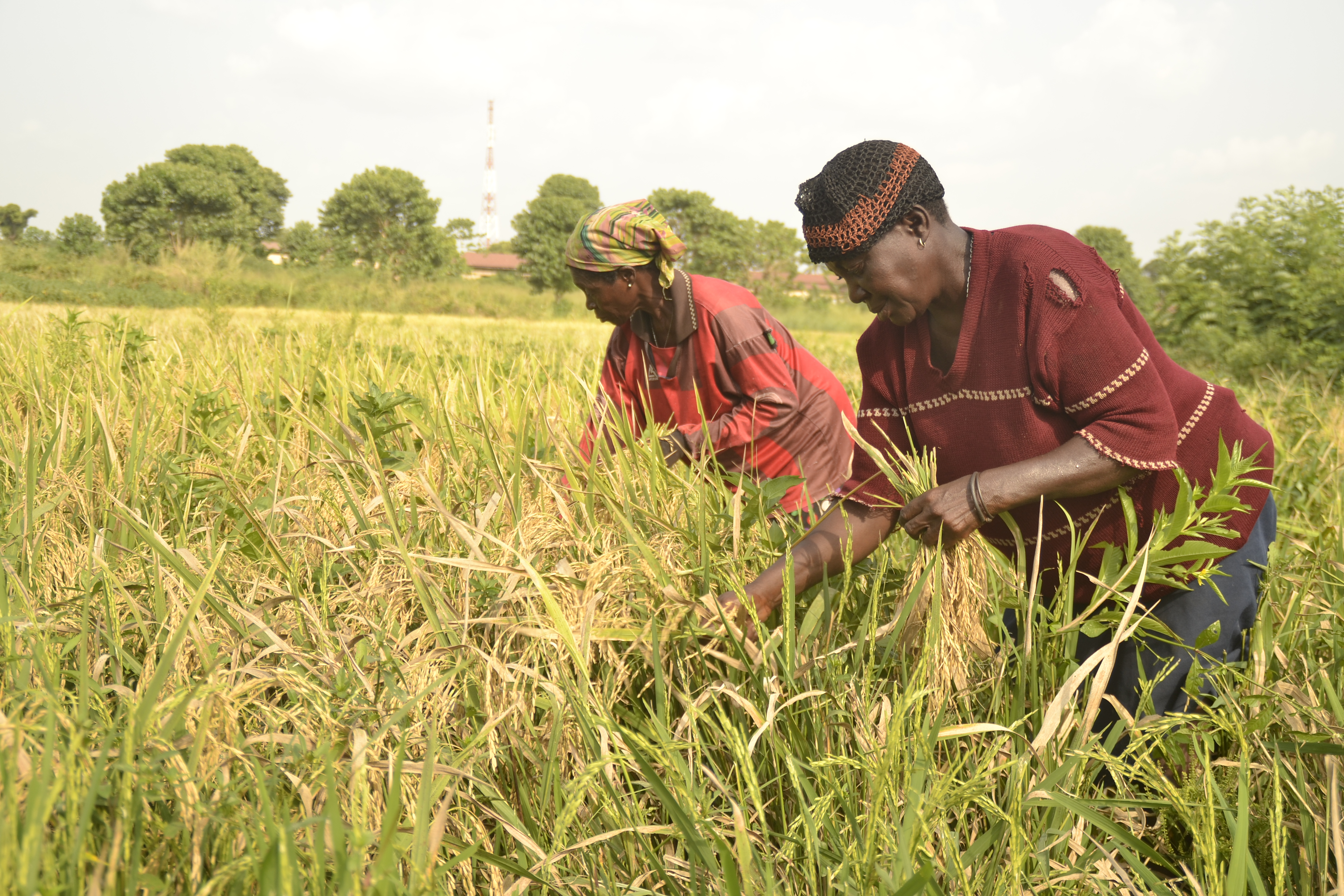
Rice processing in south east Nigeria

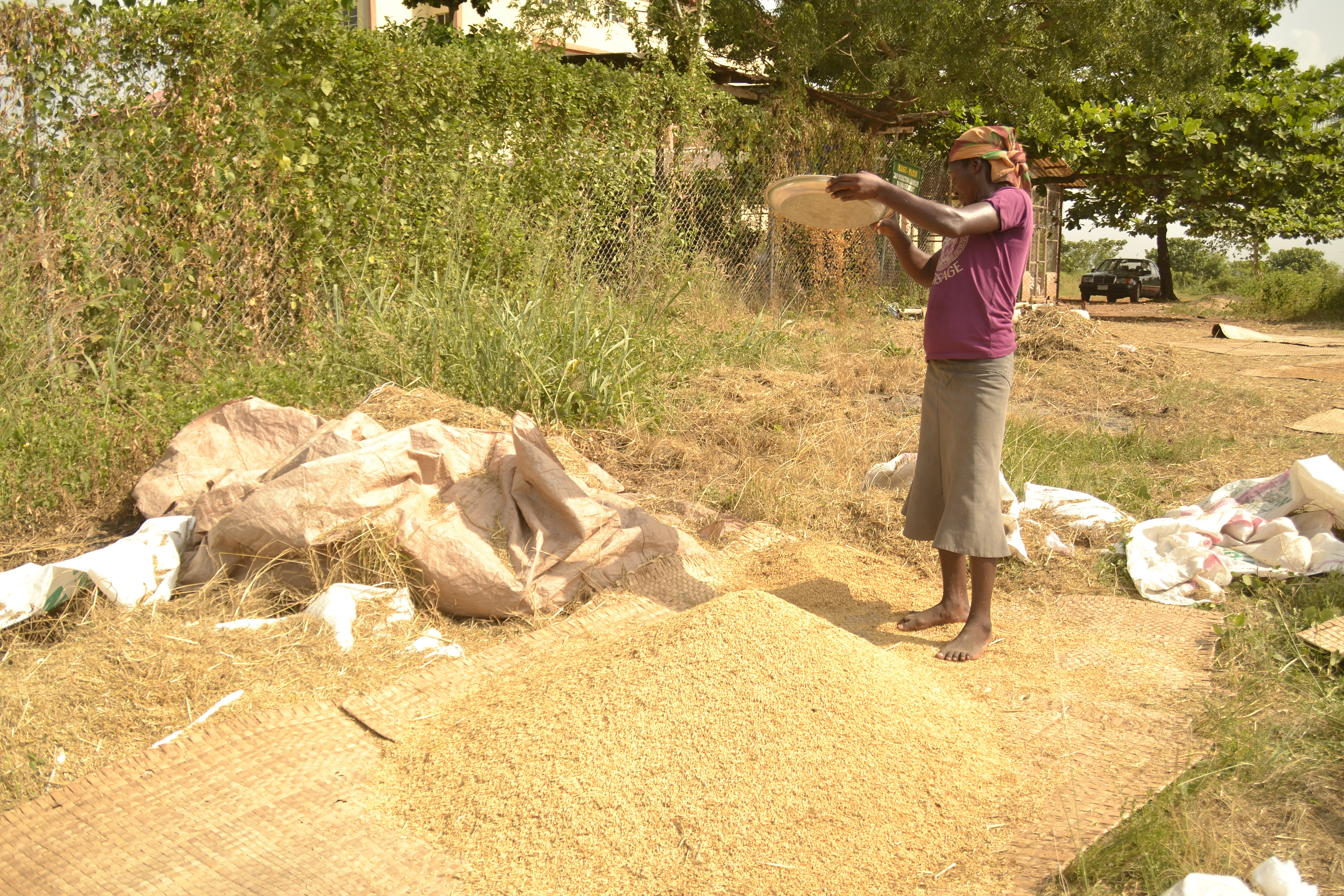
winnowing of threshed rice separates the stock from the paddy rice, by a Nigerian woman

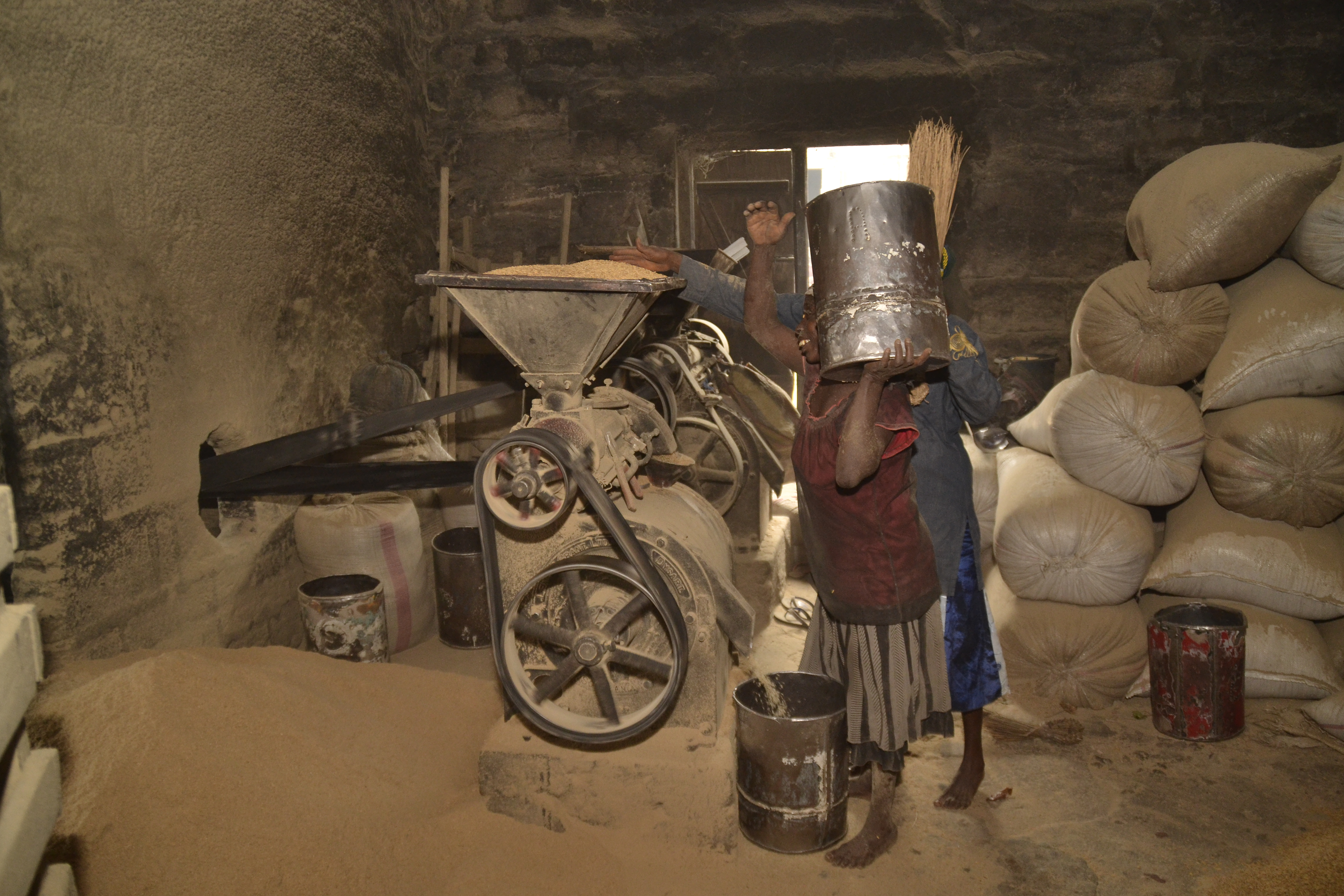
Women working in the mill. The husk and bran of the parboiled rice are removed to give the white grain in south east Nigeria.

In 2011, President Jonathan's administration launched the Agricultural Transformation Agenda, which was overseen by the Federal Ministry of Agriculture and Rural Development. The primary goal of the agenda was to position agriculture as a profitable business, integrate the agricultural value chain, and establish agriculture as a primary driver of Nigeria's economic growth. To achieve this agenda, the government implemented several measures:

- New fiscal incentives to encourage domestic import substitution
- Removal of restrictions on areas of investment and maximum equity ownership in investment by foreign investors
- Currency exchange controls – free transfer of capital, profits, and dividends
- Constitutional guarantees against nationalization/expropriation of investments
- Zero percent (0%) duty on agricultural machinery and equipment imports
- Pioneer Tax holiday for agricultural investments
- Duty waivers and other industry-related incentives, e.g., based on the use of local raw materials, export orientation

Recently, the Central Bank of Nigeria began the Anchors-Borrow program to encourage the cultivation of certain crops, especially rice.

The Federal Government of Nigeria has also closed its land borders in order to curtail rice imports and encourage local production.

In 2024, the Nigerian government temporarily banned import duties on essential agricultural commodities to combat food inflation and support local production. This policy aims to reduce food import costs and encourage investment in local farming and food processing industries.

Additionally, the government introduced financial and logistical support programs for farmers, including low-interest loans, subsidies for agricultural inputs, and investment in rural infrastructure.

The Nigerian government also introduced the Nigeria's Farmers Soil Health Card Scheme which will ensure the establishment of soil testing laboratories in various states and local government in Nigeria to boost farmers' output.

In August 2025, Nigeria imposed a six‑month ban on exporting raw shea nuts to catalyze local economic development and boost value addition.

=== Sustainable Development Goals ===
The Sustainable Development Goals in the agriculture sector in Nigeria have had an impact on the export sector responsible for the consumption and production of agricultural products in Nigeria. The exportation sector's monthly earnings have improved in four years. In January 2016, agricultural exports raked in N4.1 billion, which then rose to N25 billion by January 2017. From April 2019 to March 2020, total agriculture exports hit N289 billion for Nigeria.

Agriculture exports for the first six months of 2020 were N204.45 billion, which indicates that productivity is increasing in the sector to enable export growth.

The Sustainable Development Goals have also led to the emergence of policies that have had an impact on the agriculture sector. Some of them include the Nigerian “Agricultural Promotion Policy—2016–2020”, which focuses on ensuring food security by reducing food imports. It manages institutional reforms and incentives for technological development at the local level. The Empowering Novel Agribusiness-Led Employment Program mobilizes finance for youth-led agribusiness development. Another policy is the Agricultural Credit Guarantee Scheme Act from 2016, which offers incentives to farmers and other professionals throughout the agricultural supply chain. Finally, the “Green Alternative: The Agriculture Promotion Policy” was launched in mid-2016. It was created to boost soybean and cowpea production, which were chosen for the policy's focus due to their nutritional value and export potential.

== Drawback to Nigeria's Agricultural Sector ==
Since 2015, nomadic cattle herders' attacks on farms across Nigeria have led to abysmally low output as many farming communities have either abandoned farming or have curtailed their farming activities due to threats of crop destruction or bloody clashes. This has invariably led to skyrocketing food inflation and a rise in unemployment. Herders against Farmers: Nigeria's Expanding Deadly Conflict Farmers accuse herders of intentionally lead their cattle to eat up their crops, which sometimes made farmers to attack the herders. The herders then usually regroup to burn whole rural farming communities in retaliation.

Though Nigeria is nearing self-sufficiency in rice production , experts warn that if the protracted conflict between nomads and farmers is not solved soon, it may erode the gains made so far. Several peace accords signed between the two have failed to curtail incidences of crop destructions or the resulting violence. A recent report by the United Nations Food and Agriculture Organization revealed that around 25.3 million Nigerians are at the risk of food insecurity due to insecurity and climate change issues in Nigeria.

== See also ==
- Agricultural sustainability in northern Nigeria
- Agriculture in Rivers State
- Rural development in Nigeria
- Deforestation in Nigeria
- Yam production in Nigeria
- Cassava production in Nigeria
- Cocoa production in Nigeria
