= Minor Use Animal Drug Program =

The Minor Use Animal Drug Program (or National Research Support Project 7) is the counterpart for animals of the IR-4 Minor Crop Pest Management Program. The program targets development of therapeutic drugs for minor species, such as small ruminants and aquatic species, plus support for drugs for minor use within major species. It is carried out in partnership with the Food and Drug Administration’s (FDA) Center for Veterinary Medicine.
