= Inter-Regional Research Project Number 4 =

IR-4 Project logo

Inter-Regional Research Project Number 4 (IR-4 Project, also referred to as the Minor Crop Pest Management Program) is an agricultural program of the USDA Cooperative State Research, Education, and Extension Service which has been in effect since 1963. IR-4 works in coordination with the Environmental Protection Agency to assist in the collection of residue and efficacy data in support of the registration or reregistration of minor use pesticides and the determination of tolerances for residues of minor use chemicals in or on raw agricultural commodities. IR-4's mission is to facilitate registration of sustainable pest management technology for fruits, vegetables, ornamental plants, and other "minor" crops, i.e. high in value but not widely grown in the United States. While most of the minor uses investigated are small enough that it is not profitable for private business to establish the acceptability of a pesticide for individual specialty crops, collectively the specialty crops covered by the project make up almost half of U.S. agricultural crop production and over $40 billion in sales.

== See also ==
- Minor Use Animal Drug Program
