= Rural development in Nigeria =

Dimension of Nigerian society

Since independence, several rural development and extension education programs have been implemented in Nigeria.

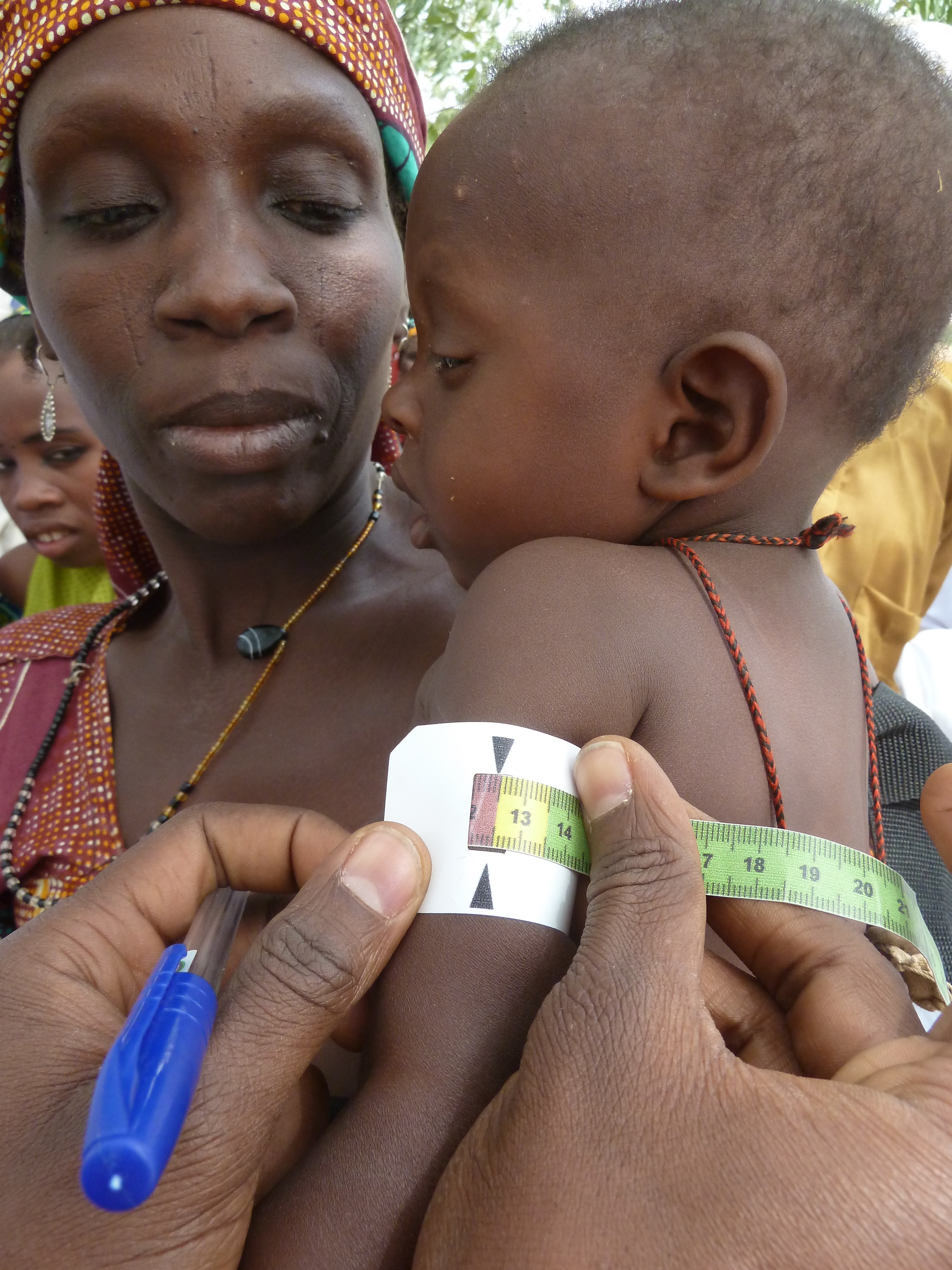
A child is checked for signs of malnutrition in Katsina State, Nigeria, March 2011

In Nigeria, several subsequent governments have implemented different policies in an attempt to develop the rural areas and alleviate the poverty rate that has become a prominent decadence in such areas. However, very little success has been recorded so far.

== The first National Development plan ==
Spanned between the years 1962–1968, with agriculture being the major priority. The major objective was developing and expanding the production and export of cash crops. But this plan only provided 42% of the capital budget to Agriculture.

It looked to maintain, and if possible, surpass the average rate of growth of 4% per year of its gross domestic product at constant prices. The plan was launched in 1962, two years after independence, and looked to bring about equal distributions of national income; to speed up the rate of economic growth; to generate savings for investments so as to reduce its dependence on external capital for the development of the nation; to get enough capital for the development of manpower; to increase the standard of living of the masses particularly in respect of food, housing, health and clothing and to develop the infrastructure of the nation. Examples such as the Niger Dam show the scope of this ambition. Additionally, the plan aimed to have greater cooperation between public and private sectors, as well as federal and regional governments.

The Plan looked to address Nigeria's newfound postcolonial independence from the British Empire. Under Britain, Nigeria served British interests through the supply of raw material, including agricultural products such as groundnuts, palm oil, and cocoa, which were required by British factories. Furthermore, the plan had to focus on agriculture, as it was still a significant sector of Nigeria's economy, employing a large proportion of the country's population, and a significant contribution to GDP. This was manifest with a yearly investment of 15% of Nigeria's gross national product. This would contribute to a minimum growth rate of 4% annually.

Ultimately, the First National Development Plan failed, the Nigerian government did not provide the amenities which were promised to farmers. Limited resources could not match the ambitions of the plan, with all four allocated settlements under the plan having no storage facilities, electricity, pipe borne water, health centres nor recreational facilities.

== Second National Development ==
In 1970, the second National Development plan was launched by General Yakubu Gowon and it lasted until 1974. Its focus was on balancing the difference between rural and urban development while making an attempt to rectify some of the shortcomings that trailed the first development plan.

Following the Civil War (1967–1970), Nigeria faced the critical need for national reconstruction and the establishment of a united and egalitarian society. The Second National Development Plan was launched to address growing challenges of regional imbalances and promote national reconstruction. This plan differed from previous ones by incorporating a democratic approach, involving stakeholders at various governance levels. This stands out from typical development plans that might be crafted by a central government without considering the input of various groups within the country. The plan received a total funding of ₦71,447,000 naira. Its goals encompassed building a strong nation, fostering social equity, and creating a dynamic economy with ample opportunities. Notably, the plan prioritised reducing the disparity between urban and rural areas.

The initial budget of the plan was ₦3.2 billion naira, but due to the oil boom, it was increased to ₦5.3 billion naira. This oil revenue surge, however, had mixed consequences. While the plan offered increased government revenue and potential for modernisation, it also led to a decline in focus on agriculture, the mainstay of the rural economy. This phenomenon is similar to the concept of Dutch Disease, which describes how the exploitation of a sudden and large natural resource wealth can negatively affect other sectors of the economy. Additionally, mismanagement of revenue made from oil further hampered progress of the plan. The political climate during this period was unstable with several military coups in the 1960s and early 1970s that made rural development efforts challenging. These coups disrupted long-term planning, diverted resources away from agriculture towards military spending, and created uncertainty for investors, hindering investment in the agricultural sector.

Akpabio (2010) argued that the failure of many public policies and programs in Nigeria can be attributed to a disregard for the specific socio-ecological factors within local communities during their execution. This instability, coupled with a lack of continuity between administrations, meant that projects initiated by one government were often not continued by the next. These factors all contributed to the challenges of implementing the Second National Development Plan.

== Third National Development ==
The Third National Development plan spanned between 1975 and 1980. It made bigger and more ambitious investment programs in various projects than the previous two, with an original investment of ₦30 billion, increasing to ₦43.3 billion, coupled with several macroeconomic projections. The main aim of this development plan was to decrease the gap between food demand and supply, and the government wanted to develop agriculture and use more modern methods across Nigeria which would create a better food supply. Specific programmes were chosen by the government to invest in for development, including the establishment of agricultural development projects (ADPs), the establishment of nine river basin development authorities (RBDAs), the supply of electricity to rural areas from large irrigation dams, commitment of resources to large scale mechanized state farming enterprises, and public efforts at land reforms through the Land Use Act of 1978.

There were several smaller objectives of this plan that would improve the living conditions of Nigeria; increase in per capita income; more even distribution of income; reduction in the level of unemployment; increase in the supply of higher-level manpower; diversification of the economy; balanced development and indigenization of economic activities. The combination of Nigeria's poor agriculture and poor standard of living meant mass funds were necessary to boost the economy.

Humphrey N. Nwosu brought forward some of the key problems surrounding the third national development plan. The development plan was a very complex process that required co-operation from the whole society, which required many resources which the country did not have. For Nigeria to succeed economically, the Nigerian government were aware that an effective transport system was needed, however they did not have enough resources within the country to accomplish this. For example, ₦5.34 billion was to generate approximately 50,000 kilometres of roads during 1975–1980, but this still went on into the fourth development plan. The issues with Nigeria's lack of resources and transportation availability meant the third development plan did not achieve its aim.

== Fourth National Development ==
The Fourth National development Plan (1981–1985) brought forth new goals for the country to achieve. These goals included: Increasing the income of Nigeria's citizens. Ensuring that income is more evenly distributed amongst the citizens and various socio- economic groups. Reducing the nation's unemployment levels along with under employment. Increasing the workforce's supply of skilled manpower. Broadening out the nation's economy by making it less dependent on a narrow set of industries. Increase the participation of Nigeria's citizens in the management and ownership of its productive industries and enterprises. Ensure that the country becomes more self-sufficient by dependence upon local resources in order to achieve common, social objectives such as: further technological development and advancements, increasing productivity within the workforce and constructing a new national idea revolving around increased discipline, a strong emphasis on a proper work ethic and a cleaner environment.

One of the plan's key features was the usage of resources generated from oil production to increase the economy's production capacity and to ensure self-sustaining economic growth.

Despite Nigeria's economy being heavily centred around the export of oil, with it composing roughly 80% of government revenue, the plans to finance the fourth national development plan via oil revenue ultimately failed. The plan had expected an annual growth rate of 7.4% between 1981 and 1985, with one of its key focuses being agriculture, domestic food production was expected to rise from 16.7 million to 20.2 million tonnes annually.

Despite this the implementation of the fourth national development plan faced many obstacles, its inauguration was delayed for approximately nine months by the Second Republic government of President Shehu Shagari. Following that, financing for the plan was impaired by falling oil revenues along with the government's general reckless spending. Exports too which were predicted to rise by 12.1% fell by 5.9%, mostly due to recession in nations belonging to the Organisation for Economic Co-operation, which reduced demand for African imports.

== Fifth National Development ==
The Fifth Development Plan and Rolling Plan within Nigeria was established in 1988 to further tackle inequality and boost the economic, social and political structure for the country. This plan sought to devalue the naira, remove import licenses, reduce tariffs, open the economy to foreign trade, promote non-oil exports through incentives and achieve national self-sufficiency in food production. This plan was said to have the vision of improving labour productivity through incentives, privatisation of many public enterprises, and different government measures to create further employment opportunities following the Fourth National Development Plan.

The primary focus of the plan was to correct the structural defects in the economy and create a more self-reliant economy that would largely be regulated by market forces. This led to the linkage between the agricultural and manufacturing sectors of the economy which were to be emphasised during the plan. The fixed five-year plan was abandoned due to the potential of a simplified and more effective plan. General Ibrahim Babangida abandoned the five-year plan in late 1989 for a 3-year rolling plan in its place.

The Fifth Development plan was scrapped in 1990 which began the era of the three-year Rolling plan which spanned from 1990 up until 1993. It was believed that the reason for the abandonment was unlike the National Development Plan, the Rolling Plan could prove more adaptive and resistant to external economic changes and uncertainties. The benefit of the Rolling Plan meant that the design of it allowed for potential annual changes. The benefits included the ability to accommodate estimates, targets and projections for another year. The objectives of the rolling plan were to reduce inflation and exchange rate instability, maintain infrastructure, achieve agricultural self-sufficiency, and reduce the burden of structural adjustment on the most vulnerable social groups. The accommodation of the rolling plan allowed for economic fundamentals to move in the right direction as it was recorded that during the years 1996-97 the inflation rate declined from 29% to 8.5%. This was also paired with the GDP showing growth as well as stability in the exchange rate.

== See also ==
- Agriculture in Nigeria
- Federal Ministry of Agriculture and Rural Development
