= Kuri cattle =

Breed of cattle

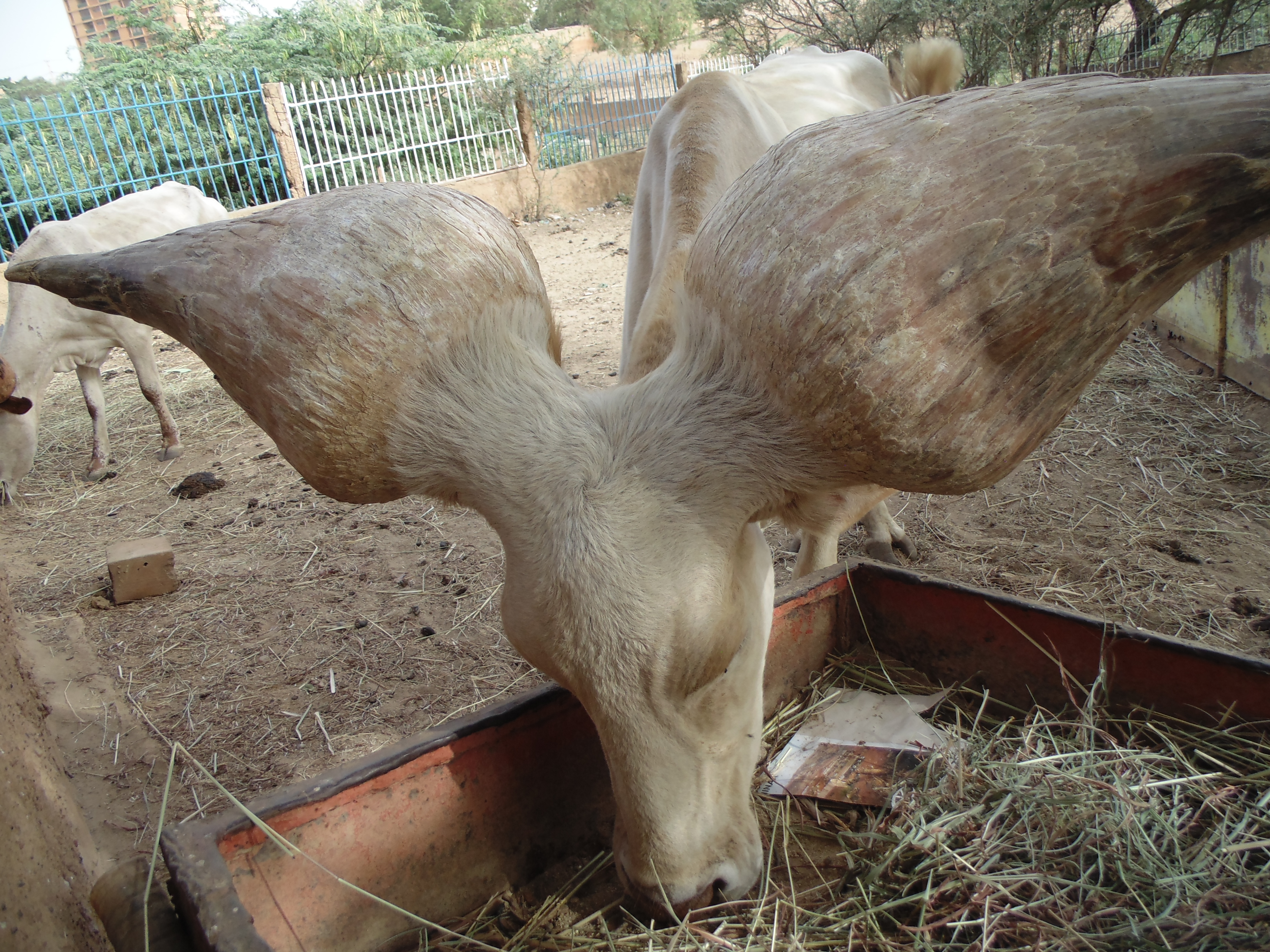
Kuri

The Kuri is a breed of the humpless longhorn group of cattle. The humpless longhorn grouping relates them to the N'dama cattle. They are used for meat, milk and work. They are intolerant of heat, sunlight, and can not stand long periods of drought. They are good swimmers and spend much of their time in Lake Chad. Despite their heavy weight, ranging anywhere from 800 to 1100 pounds, some believe what helps their swimming abilities is their unusual horns.

While Kuri are specific to the lands around Lake Chad, it has been hard to get a stable number of how many exist. However, there is evidence that shows declining populations throughout the last couple of decades. One of the reasons for Kuri's declining numbers is believed to be due to the interbreeding of them with zebus, another type of cattle. Another reason being that Kuri have been living near Lake Chad for thousands of years, which makes them hard to relocate since they have not needed to adapt much. Between 1953 and 1957, a group of Kuri were relocated to try and habituate another place outside of Lake Chad, but the attempt was a failure.
