= Food security in Nigeria =

Nigeria is the most populous country in Africa; a residence for more than 206 million people. Hunger is one of the major issues that affect the citizens. 40% (82 million people) of the citizens live below the International Poverty Line of $1.90 daily, whilst another 25% are vulnerable. Nigeria was ranked second poorest in food affordability globally by the Institute of Development Studies, United Kingdom.

In July 2025 The United Nations reported that nearly 31 million Nigerians were experiencing acute food insecurity.

This is due to a number of factors, including climate change, environmental degradation like deforestation conflict, and poverty.

== Causes ==
Factors that contribute to the hunger in various states of Nigeria are insecurity, environmental factors such as habitat destruction, economic challenges, and devastating effects of COVID-19.

Climate change is one of the biggest threats to food security in Nigeria. The country is already experiencing the effects of climate change, such as more frequent droughts and floods. These weather events can damage crops and livestock, making it difficult for farmers to produce enough food.

Conflict is another major threat to food security in Nigeria. The country is currently facing a number of conflicts, including the Boko Haram insurgency in the northeast and the farmer-herder conflict in the Middle Belt. These conflicts have displaced millions of people and made it difficult for farmers to access their land.

Poverty is also a major factor contributing to food insecurity in Nigeria. Many people in Nigeria cannot afford to buy enough food. This is due to low wages, high food prices, and unemployment.

The United Nations reported that nearly 31 million Nigerians were experiencing acute food insecurity in 2025 due to major funding cuts starting in August. The World Food Programme warned that 1.3 million people in conflict‑affected northeast Nigeria would lose access to food aid, 150 nutrition clinics in Borno State would close, putting 300,000 children at risk of severe malnutrition, while 700,000 displaced people would be left without support.

== Impacts ==
Food insecurity has a number of negative consequences for Nigeria. It can lead to malnutrition, which can impair physical and mental development. It can also lead to social unrest, as people become desperate for food. There are many consequences of hunger, namely malnutrition, undernutrition, nutritional deficiencies, and child wasting. According to UNICEF, there are three main outcomes: underweight at 36.4%, stunting at 41.3%, wasting at 15.6%.

== Historical data ==
Nigeria Hunger Statistics
Year	% of Population	Annual Change
2018	12.60%	0.70%
2017	11.90%	-0.10%
2016	12.00%	0.90%
2015	11.10%	1.30%
2014	9.80%	1.20%
2013	8.60%	1.00%
2012	7.60%	0.10%
2011	7.50%	0.10%
2010	7.40%	0.10%
2009	7.30%	0.10%
2008	7.20%	0.30%
2007	6.90%	-0.10%
2006	7.00%	−0.40%
2005	7.40%	−0.80%
2004	8.20%	−0.60%
2003	8.80%	−0.30%
2002	9.10%	0.00%
2001	9.10%	0.00%

== See also ==
- Corruption in Nigeria
- Food security
- Nigerian Cuisine
